= 2018 Bhayangkara F.C. season =

Bhayangkara
2018 season
- CEO: IGP Royke Lumowa
- Head Coach: Simon McMenemy
- Stadium: Patriot Chandrabhaga Stadium
- Liga 1: 6th
- Piala Indonesia: Second round
- Top goalscorer: League: Herman Dzumafo (8); All: Herman Dzumafo (9)
| Home colours | Away colours | Third colours |

The 2018 season is Bhayangkara's 8th season in the club's football history, the 4th season in the top-flight Liga Indonesia season and the 2nd season competing in Liga 1 since change their name from Bhayangkara Surabaya United.

On April 12, 2016, Surabaya United merged with the team following the Bhayangkara Cup 2016, PS Polri, and changed its name to Bhayangkara Surabaya United F.C. until September 2016. And in September 2016, their moved home to Bekasi, and change their name to Bhayangkara F.C. Bhayangkara F.C. manage to win the 2017 Liga 1 under coach Simon McMenemy.

== Players ==
=== Current squad ===
As of 5 April 2018

Note: Flags indicate national team as defined under FIFA eligibility rules; some limited exceptions apply. Players may hold more than one non-FIFA nationality.

| No. | Pos. | Nation | Player |
|---|---|---|---|
| 1 | GK | IDN | Wahyu Tri Nugroho |
| 2 | DF | IDN | Putu Gede |
| 3 | DF | MNE | Vladimir Vujović |
| 5 | DF | IDN | Muhammad Fatchurohman |
| 7 | MF | IDN | Vendry Mofu |
| 8 | MF | IDN | Muhammad Hargianto |
| 10 | DF | IDN | Jajang Mulyana (vice-captain) |
| 12 | GK | IDN | Awan Setho |
| 15 | MF | IDN | Maldini Pali |
| 17 | DF | IDN | Alsan Sanda |
| 18 | MF | IDN | Adam Alis |
| 19 | MF | IDN | TM Ichsan |

| No. | Pos. | Nation | Player |
|---|---|---|---|
| 20 | MF | IDN | Sani Rizki |
| 23 | MF | IDN | Wahyu Suboseto |
| 24 | FW | IDN | Marinus Wanewar |
| 27 | DF | IDN | Indra Kahfi (Captain) |
| 28 | MF | IDN | Golfriedo Agustinus |
| 29 | FW | POR | Elio Martins |
| 32 | DF | IDN | Nurhidayat |
| 33 | DF | IDN | Dany Saputra (on loan from Persija Jakarta) |
| 58 | GK | IDN | Fauzal Mubaraq |
| 80 | MF | POR | Paulo Sérgio |
| 89 | MF | KOR | Lee Yoo-joon |
| 99 | FW | IDN | Herman Dzumafo |

=== Out on loan ===
Note: Flags indicate national team as defined under FIFA eligibility rules; some limited exceptions apply. Players may hold more than one non-FIFA nationality.

| No. | Pos. | Nation | Player |
|---|---|---|---|
| 4 | DF | IDN | Ambrizal (at Kalteng Putra) |
| 25 | GK | IDN | Panggih Prio (at Persipura Jayapura) |
| 51 | FW | IDN | Dendy Sulistyawan (at Persela Lamongan) |

== Transfer ==
=== In ===
1st leg

| Date | Pos. | Name | From | Fee | Ref. |
|---|---|---|---|---|---|
| 12 December 2017 | FW | (Indonesia) Herman Dzumafo Epandi | (Indonesia) PSPS Pekanbaru | Undisclosed | |
| 12 December 2017 | FW | (Indonesia) I Made Wirahadi | (Indonesia) Bali United | Undisclosed | |
| 12 December 2017 | FW | (Indonesia) Vendry Mofu | (Indonesia) Semen Padang | Undisclosed | |
| 19 December 2017 | GK | (Indonesia) Panggih Prio | (Indonesia) Madura United | Undisclosed | |
| 19 December 2017 | FW | (Indonesia) Dinan Yahdian Javier | (Indonesia) Borneo | Undisclosed | |
| 19 December 2017 | DF | (Indonesia) Sedek Sanaky | (Indonesia) Persik Kediri | Undisclosed | |
| 22 December 2017 | DF | (Montenegro) Vladimir Vujović | (Indonesia) Persib Bandung | Undisclosed | |
| 29 December 2017 | DF | (Indonesia) Nurhidayat Haji Haris | (Indonesia) PSM Makassar | Undisclosed | |
| 3 January 2018 | MF | (Indonesia) Maldini Pali | (Indonesia) PSM Makassar | Undisclosed | |

2nd leg

| Date | Pos. | Name | From | Fee | Ref. |
|---|---|---|---|---|---|
| 13 July 2018 | MF | (Indonesia) Adam Alis | (Indonesia) Sriwijaya | Undisclosed | |
| 18 July 2018 | FW | (Portugal) Élio Martins | (Indonesia) PS TNI | Undisclosed | |

=== Out ===
1st leg

| Date | Pos. | Name | To | Fee | Ref. |
|---|---|---|---|---|---|
| 25 November 2017 | MF | (Indonesia) Firman Utina | Retired | | |
| 25 November 2017 | MF | (Indonesia) Guy Junior Ondoua | (Indonesia) PSM Makassar | Undisclosed | |
| 30 November 2017 | DF | (Indonesia) Alfin Tuasalamony | (Indonesia) Sriwijaya | Undisclosed | |
| 14 December 2017 | FW | (Indonesia) Ilija Spasojević | (Indonesia) Bali United | Undisclosed | |
| 1 December 2017 | FW | (Indonesia) Ilham Armaiyn | (Malaysia) Selangor | Undisclosed | |
| 1 December 2017 | MF | (Indonesia) Evan Dimas Darmono | (Malaysia) Selangor | Undisclosed | |
| 6 January 2018 | DF | (Brazil) Otávio Dutra | (Indonesia) Persebaya Surabaya | Undisclosed | |

2nd leg

| Date | Pos. | Name | To | Fee | Ref. |
|---|---|---|---|---|---|
| 25 November 2017 | FW | (Serbia) Nikola Komazec | (Hong Kong) Southern District | Undisclosed | |

=== Loans in ===
2nd leg

| Date from | Date to | Pos. | Name | From | Ref. |
|---|---|---|---|---|---|
| 9 July 2018 | End of season | DF | (Indonesia) Dany Saputra | (Indonesia) Persija Jakarta | |

=== Loans out ===
2nd leg

| Date from | Date to | Pos. | Name | To | Ref. |
|---|---|---|---|---|---|
| 25 July 2018 | End of season | GK | (Indonesia) Panggih Prio | (Indonesia) Persipura Jayapura | |
| 27 July 2018 | End of season | FW | (Indonesia) Dendy Sulistyawan | (Indonesia) Persela Lamongan | |

== Competitions ==
=== Liga 1 ===
| Date | Opponents | H / A | Result F–A | Scorers | Attendance |
|---|---|---|---|---|---|
| 23 March 2018 | Persija Jakarta | H | 0–0 | | 39,425 |
| 31 March 2018 | PSMS Medan | A | 2–1 | Dzumafo 39', Komazec 46' | 15,442 |
| 7 April 2018 | PSIS Semarang | H | 1–1 | Komazec 42' | 2,005 |
| 14 April 2018 | Perseru Serui | A | 0–1 | | 1,061 |
| 23 April 2018 | Persela Lamongan | H | 1–1 | Paulo Sérgio 27' | 3,750 |
| 28 April 2018 | PS Barito Putera | A | 1–3 | Dzumafo 90' | 5,437 |
| 4 May 2018 | PS TIRA | H | 4–2 | Vujović 39', Mulyana 52', Ichsan 73', Dzumafo 86' | 1,350 |
| 12 May 2018 | Sriwijaya | A | 1–2 | Paulo Sérgio 88' (pen.) | 12,861 |
| 17 May 2018 | Mitra Kukar | H | 1–0 | Hargianto 42' | 1,300 |
| 22 May 2018 | Arema | A | 0–4 | | 3,394 |
| 27 May 2018 | Borneo | H | 1–1 | Wanewar 63' | 1,250 |
| 31 May 2018 | Persib Bandung | A | 1–0 | Bauman 55' (o.g.) | 11,271 |
| 7 June 2018 | Madura United | A | 1–0 | Dzumafo 45' | 1,355 |
| 7 July 2018 | Persipura Jayapura | A | 2–0 | Dzumafo 33' (pen.), Paulo Sérgio 58' | 10,056 |
| 11 July 2018 | Persebaya Surabaya | H | 3–3 | Rishadi 17' (o.g.), Mofu 33', Sanda 84' | 1,200 |
| 15 July 2018 | PSM Makassar | A | 1–2 | Paulo Sérgio 2' | 510 |
| 21 July 2018 | Bali United | A | 3–2 | Wanewar (2) 33', 90', Martins 56' | 19,237 |
| 27 July 2018 | Persija Jakarta | A | 0–1 | | 2,733 |
| 3 August 2018 | PSMS Medan | H | 3–1 | Rizki 4', Paulo Sérgio 7', Mofu 88' | 1,570 |
| 13 August 2018 | PSIS Semarang | A | 2–1 | Dzumafo 15', Paulo Sérgio 48' | 9,477 |
| 12 September 2018 | Perseru Serui | H | 1–0 | Dzumafo 54' | 1,125 |
| 16 September 2018 | Persela Lamongan | A | 0–2 | | 6,658 |
| 22 September 2018 | PS Barito Putera | H | 2–2 | Dzumafo 25', Martins 28' | 1,257 |
| 30 September 2018 | PS TIRA | A | | | |

Locations of the 2018 Liga 1 teams

| Pos | Team | Pld | W | D | L | GF | GA | GD | Pts | Qualification or relegation |
|---|---|---|---|---|---|---|---|---|---|---|
| 1 | Persija (C) | 34 | 18 | 8 | 8 | 53 | 36 | +17 | 62 | Qualification for the AFC Champions League preliminary round 1 |
| 2 | PSM | 34 | 17 | 10 | 7 | 57 | 42 | +15 | 61 | Qualification for the AFC Cup group stage |
| 3 | Bhayangkara (Note: Bhayangkara would have qualified for the AFC Cup group stage had Persija qualified for the AFC Champions League group stage. As Persija failed to qualify for the AFC Champions League group stage, Bhayangkara's qualification in the AFC Cup was annulled.) | 34 | 15 | 8 | 11 | 41 | 39 | +2 | 53 | |
| 4 | Persib | 34 | 14 | 10 | 10 | 49 | 41 | +8 | 52 | |
| 5 | Persebaya | 34 | 14 | 8 | 12 | 60 | 48 | +12 | 50 (Note: Head-to-head results: Persebaya 1–0 Arema; Arema 1–0 Persebaya) | |

Source: Go-Jek Liga 1, Soccerway
Rules for classification: 1) Points; 2) Head-to-head; 3) Goal difference; 4) Goals scored; 5) Drawing.
(C) Champions

=== Piala Indonesia ===
| Date | Round | Opponents | H / A | Result F–A | Scorers | Attendance |
|---|---|---|---|---|---|---|
| 30 June 2018 | First round | Persitangsel | A | 7–0 | Mofu (3) 12', 61', 68', Dzumafo 32', Paulo Sérgio 44', Dendy 54', Indra 90+2' | |

== Squad statistics ==
=== Appearances ===
As of 22 September 2018

| No. | Pos | Nat | Player | Total | | Liga 1 | | Piala Indonesia | |
| No. | Pos | Nat | Player | Apps | Goals | Apps | Goals | Apps | Goals |
|---|---|---|---|---|---|---|---|---|---|
| 1 | GK | (Indonesia) | Wahyu Tri Nugroho | 8 | 0 | 7+1 | 0 | 0 | 0 |
| 2 | DF | (Indonesia) | Putu Gede | 14 | 0 | 14 | 0 | 0 | 0 |
| 3 | DF | (Montenegro) | Vladimir Vujović | 23 | 1 | 23 | 1 | 0 | 0 |
| 4 | DF | (Indonesia) | Ambrizal | 1 | 0 | 0+1 | 0 | 0 | 0 |
| 5 | DF | (Indonesia) | Muhammad Fatchurohman | 9 | 0 | 8+1 | 0 | 0 | 0 |
| 7 | MF | (Indonesia) | Vendry Mofu | 18 | 5 | 10+8 | 2 | 0 | 3 |
| 8 | MF | (Indonesia) | Muhammad Hargianto | 14 | 1 | 9+5 | 1 | 0 | 0 |
| 10 | FW | (Indonesia) | Jajang Mulyana | 16 | 1 | 15+1 | 1 | 0 | 0 |
| 12 | FW | (Indonesia) | Awan Setho | 15 | 0 | 15 | 0 | 0 | 0 |
| 15 | MF | (Indonesia) | Maldini Pali | 3 | 0 | 2+1 | 0 | 0 | 0 |
| 17 | DF | (Indonesia) | Alsan Sanda | 17 | 1 | 16+1 | 1 | 0 | 0 |
| 18 | MF | (Indonesia) | Adam Alis | 7 | 0 | 6+1 | 0 | 0 | 0 |
| 19 | MF | (Indonesia) | T.M Ichsan | 4 | 1 | 2+2 | 1 | 0 | 0 |
| 20 | MF | (Indonesia) | Sani Rizki | 12 | 1 | 10+2 | 1 | 0 | 0 |
| 23 | MF | (Indonesia) | Wahyu Suboseto | 22 | 0 | 19+3 | 0 | 0 | 0 |
| 24 | FW | (Indonesia) | Marinus Wanewar | 12 | 3 | 7+5 | 3 | 0 | 0 |
| 27 | DF | (Indonesia) | Indra Kahfi | 3 | 1 | 1+2 | 0 | 0 | 1 |
| 28 | DF | (Indonesia) | Golfriedo Agustinus | 0 | 0 | 0 | 0 | 0 | 0 |
| 29 | FW | (Portugal) | Elio Martins | 5 | 1 | 4+1 | 1 | 0 | 0 |
| 32 | DF | (Indonesia) | Nurhidayat | 10 | 0 | 9+1 | 0 | 0 | 0 |
| 33 | DF | (Indonesia) | Dany Saputra | 6 | 0 | 5+1 | 0 | 0 | 0 |
| 38 | GK | (Indonesia) | Indra Adi | 1 | 0 | 0+1 | 0 | 0 | 0 |
| 58 | GK | (Indonesia) | Fauzal Mubaraq | 0 | 0 | 0 | 0 | 0 | 0 |
| 80 | GK | (Portugal) | Paulo Sérgio | 21 | 7 | 20+1 | 6 | 0 | 1 |
| 89 | MF | (South Korea) | Lee Yoo-joon | 22 | 0 | 22 | 0 | 0 | 0 |
| 98 | MF | (Indonesia) | Reksa Maulana | 0 | 0 | 0 | 0 | 0 | 0 |
| 99 | FW | (Indonesia) | Herman Dzumafo | 22 | 8 | 13+9 | 7 | 0 | 1 |
Players away from the club on loan:
| 25 | GK | (Indonesia) | Panggih Prio | 1 | 0 | 1 | 0 | 0 | 0 |
| 51 | FW | (Indonesia) | Dendy Sulistyawan | 12 | 2 | 5+7 | 1 | 0 | 1 |
Players who appeared for Bhayangkara no longer at the club:
| 11 | FW | (Serbia) | Nikola Komazec | 12 | 2 | 10+2 | 2 | 0 | 0 |
