= 2017 Bhayangkara F.C. season =

Bhayangkara F.C.
2017 season
- CEO: Irjen Pol Royke Lumowa
- Head Coach: Simon McMenemy
- Stadium: Patriot Chandrabhaga Stadium
- Liga 1: 1st
- Piala Presiden: Quarter-finals
- Top goalscorer: League: Ilija Spasojević (12); All: Ilija Spasojević (12)
- Highest home attendance: 29,640 vs Persija (29 July 2017, Liga 1)
- Lowest home attendance: 153 vs Persegres (28 August 2017, Liga 1)
- Average home league attendance: 14,000
Home colours	Away colours	Third colours

The 2017 season is Bhayangkara's 7th season in the club's football history, the 3rd season in the top-flight Liga Indonesia season and the 1st season competing in Liga 1 since change their name from Persebaya ISL. On April 12, 2016, Surabaya United merged with the team following the Bhayangkara Cup 2016, PS Polri, and changed its name to Bhayangkara Surabaya United F.C. until September 2016. And in September 2016, their moved home to Bekasi, and change their name to Bhayangkara F.C. Bhayangkara F.C. manage to win the 2017 Liga 1 under coach Simon McMenemy.

== Players ==
=== Squad information ===
Players and squad numbers last updated on 20 October 2017.
Note: Flags indicate national team as has been defined under FIFA eligibility rules. Players may hold more than one non-FIFA nationality.

No.	Name	Nat	Position(s)	Date of Birth (Age)	Signed in	Contract ends	Signed from	Notes
Goalkeepers
12	Awan Setho Raharjo	(Indonesia)	GK	20 March 1997 (age 29)	2016	2018	(Indonesia) PSIS Semarang	
58	Fauzal Mubaraq	(Indonesia)	GK	6 January 1984 (age 42)	2017	2017	(Indonesia) Persiba Balikpapan	
72	Rully Desrian	(Indonesia)	GK	19 December 1996 (age 29)	2016	2017	(Indonesia) Bali United F.C.	
Defenders
2	Putu Gede Juni Antara	(Indonesia)	RB	7 June 1995 (age 31)	2017	2018	(Indonesia) Bali United F.C.	Under-23 player
3	Dany Saputra	(Indonesia)	RB	1 January 1991 (age 35)	2016	2017		Under-23 player
5	Otávio Dutra	(Brazil)	LB	22 December 1983 (age 42)	2017	2017	(Indonesia) Persipura Jayapura	
17	Alsan Sanda	(Indonesia)	CB	1 August 1992 (age 34)	2015	2017	(Indonesia) Bali United F.C.	
18	Firly Apriansyah	(Indonesia)	RB / LB	27 April 1986 (age 40)	2017	2017	(Indonesia) Pusamania Borneo F.C.	
24	Muhammad Fatchurohman	(Indonesia)	LB / CB	22 June 1995 (age 31)	2015	2019		Under-23 player
26	Alfin Tuasalamony	(Indonesia)	CB	13 November 1992 (age 34)	2017	2017	(Indonesia) Persija Jakarta	
27	Indra Kahfi Ardhiyasa	(Indonesia)	CB	5 October 1986 (age 40)	2016	2017	(Indonesia) Persitara Jakarta Utara	Captain
34	Muhammad Sahrul Kurniawan	(Indonesia)	CB	5 June 1995 (age 31)	2016	2017	(Indonesia) Persinga Ngawi	Under-23 player
46	Suroso	(Indonesia)	RB / DM	24 April 1981 (age 45)	2016	2017	(Indonesia) Arema	
97	Golfriedo Agustinus Syauta	(Indonesia)	CB		2017	2017		Under-23 player
Midfielders
6	Evan Dimas Darmono	(Indonesia)	CM / DM	13 March 1995 (age 31)	2017	2017		Under-23 player
15	Firman Utina	(Indonesia)	CM	15 December 1981 (age 44)	2015	2018	(Indonesia) Sriwijaya F.C.	Vice Captain
16	Zulfiandi	(Indonesia)	DM	17 July 1995 (age 31)	2016	2017	(Indonesia) PSSB Bireun	Under-23 player
19	Teuku Ichsan	(Indonesia)	AM	25 November 1997 (age 28)	2017	2017	(Indonesia) Bhayangkara FC U-23	Under-23 player
23	Wahyu Suboseto	(Indonesia)	AM	16 July 1993 (age 33)	2017	2017		
89	Lee Yoo-joon	(South Korea)	AM	26 September 1989 (age 37)	2017	2017	(South Korea) Chungju Hummel FC	
Forwards
7	Antony Nugroho	(Indonesia)	LW	25 February 1994 (age 32)	2017	2017	(Indonesia) Arema Malang	Under-23 player
10	Jajang Mulyana	(Indonesia)	ST	23 October 1988 (age 38)	2017	2017	(Indonesia) Martapura F.C.	
20	Ilham Armaiyn	(Indonesia)	RW	10 May 1996 (age 30)	2014	2017		Under-23 player
22	Dendy Sulistyawan	(Indonesia)	RW	12 October 1996 (age 30)	2017	2017	(Indonesia) Persela Lamongan	Under-23 player
39	Guy Junior Ondoua	(Indonesia)	LW	30 August 1986 (age 40)	2017	2017	(Indonesia) Madura United F.C.	
80	Paulo Sérgio	(Portugal)	LW	24 January 1984 (age 42)	2017	2018	Brunei DPMM	Marquee player
87	Ilija Spasojević	(Indonesia)	ST	11 September 1987 (age 39)	2017	2017	(Malaysia) Melaka United	
