= 2016 Bhayangkara Surabaya United F.C. season =

Bhayangkara Surabaya United
2016 season
- Chairman: Irjen Pol Condro Kirono
- Manager: (Indonesia) Ibnu Grahan
- TSC A: 6
- Top goalscorer: League: Rudi & Thiago (4 gol); All: Rudi & Thiago (4 gol)
- Highest home attendance: 9,612 vs PS TNI (8 Mei 2016)
- Lowest home attendance: 8,000 vs Sriwijaya FC (22 Mei 2016)

In the 2016 season, Bhayangkara Surabaya United compete in Indonesia Soccer Championship A. Persebaya Surabaya (ISL) were after temporary name changes to Persebaya United, Bonek F.C., and Surabaya United, following a prohibition to use the name Persebaya, renamed to Bhayangkara Surabaya United (as a merger with Indonesian National Police club PS Polri). On 10 September 2016, Bhayangkara Surabaya United changed name to Bhayangkara and were relocated to Sidoarjo.

== Squad ==
Note: Flags indicate national team as defined under FIFA eligibility rules; some limited exceptions apply. Players may hold more than one non-FIFA nationality.

No.	Pos.	Nation	Player
1	GK	IDN	Wahyu Tri Nugroho
2	DF	IDN	I Putu Gede Juni Antara
3	DF	IDN	Dany Saputra
4	DF	IDN	Suroso
5	DF	BRA	Otávio Dutra (c)
6	MF	IDN	Evan Dimas
7	FW	IDN	Justin Stephen
8	MF	IDN	Indra Setiawan
10	FW	IDN	Rudi Widodo
12	MF	IDN	Wahyu Subo Seto
16	MF	IDN	Zulfiandi
17	MF	IDN	Fitra Ridwan
18	MF	Timor-Leste	Paulo Helber
20	FW	IDN	Ilham Udin Armayn

No.	Pos.	Nation	Player
21	DF	IDN	Muhammad Fatchurohman
22	FW	IDN	Fandi Eko Utomo
27	DF	IDN	Indra Kahfi Ardhiyaksa
30	GK	IDN	Thomas Ryan Bayu
31	FW	IDN	Bijahil Chalwa
34	DF	IDN	Muhammad Sahrul Kurniawan
36	DF	IDN	Ahmad Hari Satria Perdana
46	MF	IDN	Muhammad Aulia Ardli
53	DF	IDN	Herwin Tri Saputra
68	DF	IDN	Eldjo Iba
77	GK	IDN	Fafa Tharista
81	MF	IDN	Muhammad Hargianto
86	MF	MAR	Khairallah Abdelkbir
99	FW	BRA	Thiago Furtuoso Dos Santos

== League table ==
=== Results by round ===
Overall								Home						Away					
Pld	W	D	L	GF	GA	GD	Pts	W	D	L	GF	GA	GD	W	D	L	GF	GA	GD
12	7	2	3	18	12	+6	23	3	1	2	8	4	+4	4	1	1	10	8	+2

Source: Hasil dan klasemen ISC A

== Matches ==
=== Torabika Soccer Championship ===
Waktu	Lawan	K / T	Hasil F – A	Pencetak Gol	Jumlah Penonton	Laporan
30 April 2016	Barito Putera	T	2 - 1	Otávio Dutra 20' (pen.), Rudi Widodo 84'	8,178	
8 Mei 2016	PS TNI	K	0 - 0		9,612	
15 Mei 2016	Arema Cronus FC	T	0 - 3		29,650	
22 Mei 2016	Sriwijaya FC	K	0 - 1		8,000	
27 Mei 2016	Pusamania Borneo F.C.	T	1 - 1	Evan Dimas 86'	3,542	
11 Juni 2016	Persib Bandung	K	4 - 1	Thiago Furtuoso 42', 53', Rudi Widodo 45', Otavio Dutra 64'		
20 Juni 2016	Persiba Balikpapan	T	2 - 0	Muhammad Hargianto 85', Evan Dimas 90'		Laporan
25 Juni 2016	Madura United FC	K	0 - 1			Laporan
3 Juli 2016	Bali United Pusam F.C.	K	3 - 1	Khairallah Abdelkbir 8', Rudi Widodo 38', Fandi Eko Utomo 65'		Laporan
17 Juli 2016	Mitra Kutai Kartanegara	T	3 - 2	Rudi Widodo 6', Otavio Dutra 14', Thiago Furtuoso 90'		Laporan
21 Juli 2016	Gresik United	K	1 - 0	Evan Dimas 81'		Laporan
25 Juli 2016	PSM Makassar	T	2 - 1	Thiago Furtuoso 67', Khairallah Abdelkbir 70'		Laporan
30 Juli 2016	Persija Jakarta	K				
5 Agustus 2016	Persipura Jayapura	K				
12 Agustus 2016	Semen Padang FC	T				
19 Agustus 2016	Persela Lamongan	T				
29 Agustus 2016	Perseru Serui	K				

== Players ==
=== Topscorers ===
Peringkat	No.	Pos.	Pemain	Gol
1	10	FW	(Indonesia) Rudi Widodo	4
1	99	FW	(Brazil) Thiago Furtuoso Dos Santos	4
2	5	DF	(Brazil) Otávio Dutra	3
2	6	MF	(Indonesia) Evan Dimas	3
3	86	MF	(Morocco) Khairallah Abdelkbir	2
4	8	MF	(Indonesia) Muhammad Hargianto	1
4	22	MF	(Indonesia) Fandi Eko Utomo	1
