= Muhammad Fatchurohman =

Indonesian footballer

Personal information
- Full name: Muhammad Fatchurohman
- Date of birth: 28 June 1995 (age 31)
- Place of birth: Pasuruan, East Java, Indonesia
- Height: 1.63 m (5 ft 4 in)
- Position: Full-back

Team information
- Current team: Kendal Tornado

Youth career
- SSB Naga Gempol

Senior career*
Years	Team	Apps	(Gls)
2013–2014	Persekap Pasuruan	7	(0)
2014–2025	Bhayangkara	115	(0)
2025–2026	Sumsel United	16	(0)
2026–	Kendal Tornado	0	(0)

International career^{‡}
2013–2014	Indonesia U19	15	(0)
Medal record
Men's football
Representing Indonesia
AFF U-19 Youth Championship
Winner	2013 Indonesia
- * Club domestic league appearances and goals as of 26 April 2026 ‡ National team caps and goals as of 13 March 2015

Muhammad Fatchurohman (born 28 June 1995) is an Indonesian professional footballer who plays as a full-back for Championship club Kendal Tornado.

== Club career ==
=== Early career ===
Fatchurohman started his career at SSB Naga Gempol in his hometown Pasuruan. In 2010, he joined Persekap Pasuruan. And he played in Indonesia U-19 who coached by Indra Sjafri.

=== Persebaya Bhayangkara ===
In 2015, he joined Persebaya ISL (Bhayangkara) with Evan Dimas, Ilham Armaiyn, Putu Gede Juni Antara, Zulfiandi, Hargianto, and Sahrul Kurniawan. he was contracted for four years.

== Honours ==
=== Club ===
Bhayangkara

- Liga 1: 2017
- Liga 2 runner-up: 2024–25

=== International ===
Indonesia U-19

- AFF U-19 Youth Championship: 2013
