= Ardhiyasa =

Ardhiyasa is an Indonesian name. Notable people with the name include:

- Andritany Ardhiyasa (born 1991), Indonesian footballer
- Indra Kahfi Ardhiyasa (born 1986), Indonesian footballer
