= Panggih Prio =

Indonesian association football player

Personal information
- Full name: Panggih Prio Sembodho
- Date of birth: 3 March 1998 (age 28)
- Place of birth: Medan, Indonesia
- Height: 1.83 m (6 ft 0 in)
- Position: Goalkeeper

Team information
- Current team: De Red
- Number: 75

Youth career
- 2016: Bhayangkara U-21

Senior career*
Years	Team	Apps	(Gls)
2017–2023	Bhayangkara	1	(0)
2017	→ Madura United (loan)	3	(0)
2018–2019	→ Persipura Jayapura (loan)	4	(0)
2023–2024	PSBS Biak	8	(0)
2024–2026	Deltras	36	(0)
2026–	De Red	1	(0)

International career
2013	Indonesia U16	9	(0)
Medal record
Men's football
Representing Indonesia
AFF U-16 Youth Championship
Runner-up	2013 Myanmar
- * Club domestic league appearances and goals as of 12 September 2026

Panggih Prio Sembodho (born 3 March 1998) is an Indonesian professional footballer who plays as a goalkeeper for Championship club De Red.

== Career statistics ==
=== Club ===
As of match played 12 September 2026

Club	Season	League		Cup		Other		Total	
Club	Season	Apps	Goals	Apps	Goals	Apps	Goals	Apps	Goals
Bhayangkara	2017	0	0	0	0	0	0	0	0
Bhayangkara	2018	1	0	0	0	0	0	1	0
Bhayangkara	2020	0	0	0	0	0	0	0	0
Bhayangkara	2021–22	0	0	0	0	0	0	0	0
Bhayangkara	2022–23	0	0	0	0	0	0	0	0
Madura United (loan)	2017	3	0	0	0	0	0	3	0
Persipura Jayapura (loan)	2018	4	0	0	0	0	0	4	0
PSBS Biak	2023–24	8	0	0	0	0	0	8	0
Deltras	2024–25	13	0	0	0	0	0	13	0
Deltras	2025–26	23	0	0	0	0	0	23	0
de Red	2026–27	1	0	0	0	0	0	1	0
Career total		52	0	0	0	0	0	52	0

== Honours ==
=== Club ===
PSBS Biak

- Liga 2: 2023–24

=== International ===
Indonesia U16

- AFF U-16 Youth Championship runner-up: 2013
