= Khairallah Abdelkbir =

Moroccan footballer

Personal information
- Full name: Khairallah Abdelkbir
- Date of birth: 20 September 1983 (age 43)
- Place of birth: Casablanca, Morocco
- Height: 1.75 m (5 ft 9 in)
- Position: Midfielder

Senior career*
Years	Team	Apps	(Gls)
2004	Raja Casablanca		
2004–2005	Youssoufia Berrechid		
2005–2006	SCC Mohammédia		
2006–2008	Fath Union Sport		
2008–2009	JS Massira	9	(0)
2009–2010	Al-Nasr SC	19	(0)
2010–2011	COD Meknès	18	(1)
2011–2012	Wydad de Fès	2	(0)
2012–2013	Ittihad Tanger	8	(0)
2013–2014	Racing de Casablanca	7	(0)
2014–2015	ES Métlaoui	3	(0)
2016	Bhayangkara	32	(4)
2021	Persis Solo	1	(0)
2021	Sriwijaya	7	(0)
2022	PSDS Deli Serdang	0	(0)
2022	Persekat Tegal	4	(0)
- * Club domestic league appearances and goals as of 1 October 2022

Khairallah Abdelkbir (born 20 September 1983) is a Moroccan former footballer who plays as a midfielder.

== Club career ==
At the age of six, Abdelkbir entered the Raja Casablanca youth academy. However, he fought with his mother because she disapproved of football and wanted him to get into college. Eventually, she supported him when he started earning money from the sport.

In 2018, while a free agent, Abdelkbir played in a village tournament (Tarkam) and stated that the competition was harder than the Super League because the amateur players go harder against professionals. He has also stated that the public interest in football in Indonesia was extremely high.

After leaving Bhayangkara in 2016, he has not featured in the league for any Indonesian club. Despite this, he has trialed for a few teams, including Madura United in 2017 and PSS Sleman in 2019.

=== Persis Solo ===
He was signed for Persis Solo to play in the Liga 2 in the 2021 season. Abdelkbir made his debut on 12 October 2021 in a match against PSIM Yogyakarta at the Manahan Stadium, Surakarta.

=== Sriwijaya ===
In November 2021, Abdelkbir signed a contract with Liga 1 club Sriwijaya in the second round of 2021 Liga 2 (Indonesia). He made his league debut in a 2–0 win against Muba Babel United on 4 November 2021 as a substitute for Afriansyah in the 67th minute at the Kaharudin Nasution Rumbai Stadium, Pekanbaru.

== Personal life ==
Born and raised in Morocco, he acquired Indonesian citizenship in 2021.

== Career statistics ==
As of 1 October 2022

Appearances and goals by club, season and competition
Club	Season	League			Cup		Continental		Other		Total	
Club	Season	Division	Apps	Goals	Apps	Goals	Apps	Goals	Apps	Goals	Apps	Goals
Bhayangkara	2016	ISC A	32	4	0	0	–		0	0	32	4
Persis Solo	2021	Liga 2	1	0	0	0	–		0	0	1	0
Sriwijaya	2021	Liga 2	7	0	0	0	–		0	0	7	0
Persekat Tegal	2022–23	Liga 2	4	0	0	0	–		0	0	4	0
Career total			44	4	0	0	0	0	0	0	44	4
