= Luke Xavier Keet =

Indonesian footballer (born 2003)

Personal information
- Date of birth: 28 July 2003 (age 23)
- Place of birth: Jakarta, Indonesia
- Height: 1.81 m (5 ft 11 in)
- Positions: Midfielder; winger

Team information
- Current team: Bhayangkara Presisi
- Number: 88

Youth career
- –2019: UE Cornellà
- 2019–2021: UD Viladecans

Senior career*
Years	Team	Apps	(Gls)
2021	Walthamstow FC		
2023–2024	PAE GS Diagoras	3	(0)
2024–2025	Niki Volos FC	0	(0)
2025	OFC Spartak Pleven	0	(0)
2025–2026	GS Ilioupolis	0	(0)
2026–	Bhayangkara Presisi	0	(0)
- * Club domestic league appearances and goals

Luke Xavier Keet (born 28 July 2003) is an Indonesian professional footballer who plays as a midfielder or winger for Super League club Bhayangkara Presisi.

== Early life ==
Keet was born on 23 July 2003. Born in Jakarta, Indonesia, he was born to an Australian father and an Indonesian mother. At the age of nine, he moved from Indonesia to Europe.

== Career ==
As a youth player, Keet joined the youth academy of Spanish side UE Cornellà. Following his stint there, he signed for English side Walthamstow FC in 2021. Subsequently, he signed for Greek side PAE GS Diagoras in 2023, where he made three league appearances and scored zero goals.

Ahead of the 2024–25 season, he signed for Greek side Niki Volos FC, where he made zero league appearances and scored zero goals. During February 2025, he signed for Bulgarian side OFC Spartak Pleven, where he made zero league appearances and scored zero goals. Six months later, he signed for Greek side GS Ilioupolis.

On 24 July 2026, Keet move to Indonesia and signing a contract with Super League side Bhayangkara Presisi for the 2026–27 season.

== Style of play ==
Keet plays as a midfielder or winger. Indonesian news website CNN Indonesia wrote in 2025 that he "possesses excellent playing technique and speed. His natural position as a left winger allows him to roam the flanks to build attacks".
