= Fauzal Mubaraq =

Indonesian footballer

Personal information
- Full name: Fauzal Mubaraq
- Date of birth: 6 January 1984 (age 42)
- Place of birth: Indragiri Hilir, Indonesia
- Height: 1.80 m (5 ft 11 in)
- Position: Goalkeeper

Senior career*
Years	Team	Apps	(Gls)
2000–2002	Persiks Kuantan Singingi		
2003–2005	PSPS Pekanbaru		
2007–2010	Persela Lamongan	46	(0)
2010–2011	Sriwijaya	6	(0)
2011–2016	PSPS Pekanbaru	18	(0)
2017–2019	Bhayangkara	2	(0)

International career
2007	Indonesia U-23		

Managerial career
- 2023: Arema (goalkeeper coach)
- * Club domestic league appearances and goals

Fauzal Mubaraq (born 6 January 1984) is an Indonesian former footballer.

== Honours ==
Sriwijaya

- Indonesian Community Shield: 2010
- Indonesian Inter Island Cup: 2010

Bhayangkara

- Liga 1: 2017
