= Choirul Huda =

Indonesian footballer (1979–2017)

- Huda playing for Persela Lamongan

Personal information
- Date of birth: 2 June 1979
- Place of birth: Lamongan, Indonesia
- Date of death: 15 October 2017 (aged 38)
- Place of death: Lamongan, Indonesia
- Height: 1.83 m (6 ft 0 in)
- Position: Goalkeeper

Youth career
- Persela Lamongan

Senior career*
Years	Team	Apps	(Gls)
1999–2017	Persela Lamongan	503	(0)
- * Club domestic league appearances and goals

Choirul Huda (2 June 1979 – 15 October 2017) was an Indonesian professional footballer and civil servant.

== Personal life ==
Huda began his career in Persela Lamongan since 1999 and stayed with the club until his death in 2017. A legend of the club, he was dubbed "One Man, One Club, One Love" by Persela supporters.

According to Indonesian football writer Antony Sutton, "he played for his local team, he was living the dream. He was just happy in his skin and happy in his town. He's a legend – a one-club man, His ambition was to become his club's goalkeeping coach after he retired. He never created a fuss about anything. He loved what he was doing but did it in such an understated way."

He was married and had two children.

== International career ==
Huda was given his first call-up for the Indonesia national team in a 2015 AFC Asian Cup qualification match, a 1–1 draw against China on 15 October 2013. Huda was called up another six times but didn't play.

== Death ==
Huda died after an incident in a match against Semen Padang at the 2017 Liga 1. He collided with teammate Ramon Rodrigues while trying to collect the ball from an opponent and was struck in the chest. Paramedics immediately gave him sideline emergency treatment. A paramedic said that after the incident, he was still conscious and complained of a chest pain, but his condition soon relapsed and he later died from his injuries in a local hospital.

According to a doctor in the local hospital, he suffered a collision on his chest and lower jaw, which caused hypoxia that ultimately led to his death. Moreover, due to severe injuries, he might have also experienced trauma to his head, neck and chest.

== Honours ==
Persela Lamongan

- Liga Indonesia Second Division: 2001
- East Java Governor's Cup: 2003, 2007, 2009, 2010, 2012

== See also ==
- List of one-club men in association football
