= Alsan Sanda =

Indonesian footballer (born 1992)

Personal information
- Full name: Alsan Putra Masat Sanda
- Date of birth: 1 August 1992 (age 34)
- Place of birth: Kupang, Indonesia
- Height: 1.72 m (5 ft 8 in)
- Position: Right-back

Team information
- Current team: Bhayangkara
- Number: 88

Senior career*
Years	Team	Apps	(Gls)
2016	Bali United	23	(1)
2017–	Bhayangkara	85	(5)
- * Club domestic league appearances and goals as of 3 October 2024

Alsan Putra Masat Sanda (born 1 August 1992) is an Indonesian professional footballer who plays as a right-back and occasionally as a winger for Liga 2 club Bhayangkara. Alsan also is a member of the Regional Police (Polda) in East Nusa Tenggara

== Club career ==
=== Bali United ===
Alsan made his debut in the 2015 Sudirman Cup. He was contracted for one year by the club management. and Alsan made his first goal against Arema FC in the Indonesia Soccer Championship. In that match, Alsan scored goal in the 28th minutes.

=== Bhayangkara ===
In 2017, Sanda signed a contract with Indonesian Liga 1 club Bhayangkara. He made his debut on 23 April 2017 in a match against Arema. On 13 July 2017, Sanda scored his first goal for Bhayangkara against Madura United in the 72nd minute at the Patriot Stadium, Bekasi.

== Career statistics ==
=== Club ===
As of match played 3 October 2024

Club	Season	League			Cup (Note: Includes Piala Indonesia)		Continental		Other (Note: Appearances in Indonesia President's Cup)		Total	
Club	Season	Division	Apps	Goals	Apps	Goals	Apps	Goals	Apps	Goals	Apps	Goals
Bali United	2016	ISC A	23	1	0	0	–		0	0	23	1
Bhayangkara	2017	Liga 1	24	1	0	0	–		4	0	28	1
Bhayangkara	2018	Liga 1	27	2	2	1	–		3	0	32	3
Bhayangkara	2019	Liga 1	23	2	4	1	–		2	0	29	3
Bhayangkara	2020	Liga 1	1	0	0	0	–		0	0	1	0
Bhayangkara	2021–22	Liga 1	0	0	0	0	–		3 (Note: Appearances in Menpora Cup)	1	3	1
Bhayangkara	2022–23	Liga 1	4	0	0	0	–		0	0	4	0
Bhayangkara	2023–24	Liga 1	5	0	0	0	–		0	0	5	0
Bhayangkara	2024–25	Liga 2	1	0	0	0	–		0	0	1	0
Total			85	5	6	2	0	0	12	1	103	8
Career total			108	6	6	2	0	0	12	1	126	9

== Honours ==
=== Club ===
Bhayangkara

- Liga 1: 2017
- Liga 2 runner-up: 2024–25
