= Awan Setho Raharjo =

Indonesian footballer

Awan Setho
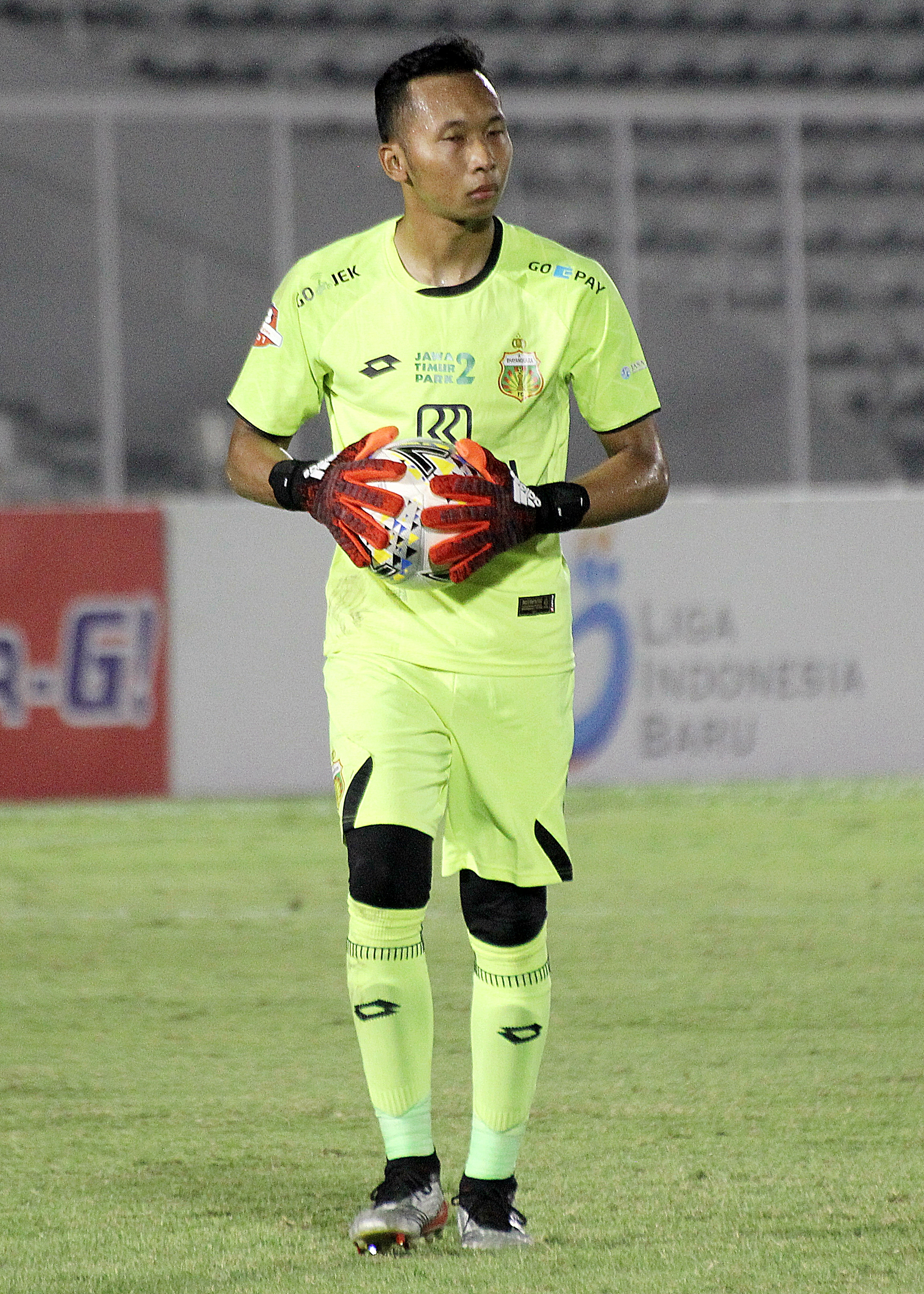
- Awan Setho playing for Bhayangkara in 2019

Personal information
- Full name: Awan Setho Raharjo
- Date of birth: 20 March 1997 (age 29)
- Place of birth: Semarang, Indonesia
- Height: 1.74 m (5 ft 9 in)
- Position: Goalkeeper

Team information
- Current team: Bhayangkara
- Number: 12

Youth career
- 2010: SSB Pengcab Semarang
- 2012–2013: Deportivo Indonesia

Senior career*
Years	Team	Apps	(Gls)
2015–2016	Bali United	0	(0)
2016	Persip Pekalongan	6	(0)
2017–	Bhayangkara	169	(0)
2017	→ PSIS Semarang (loan)	4	(0)

International career
2013–2016	Indonesia U19	10	(0)
2017–2019	Indonesia U23	11	(0)
2017–2019	Indonesia	4	(0)
Medal record
Men's football
Representing Indonesia
AFF U-22 Youth Championship
Winner	2019 Cambodia	Team
- * Club domestic league appearances and goals as of 11 May 2026

Awan Setho Raharjo (born 20 March 1997) is an Indonesian professional footballer who plays as a goalkeeper for and captains Super League club Bhayangkara. He is a Second Police Brigadier in the Indonesian National Police.

== Club career ==
=== Bali United ===
Bali United was his first professional football club. He was brought by his ex-manager in Indonesia U-19, Indra Sjafri to join Bali United.

=== Persip Pekalongan ===
Awan joined Persip Pekalongan for 2016 Indonesia Soccer Championship B. He debuted against PSCS Cilacap .

=== Bhayangkara FC ===
Awan moved to Bhayangkara as third choice goalkeeper behind Wahyu Tri Nugroho and Rully Desrian. Awan was loaned out to PSIS Semarang. He played well in four matches with PSIS Semarang. When Wahyu was injured, Awan was called back to Bhayangkara.

Awan's move back to Bhayangkara was a good option in 2017, because he was first goalkeeper in Bhayangkara Awan and found success in the 2017 Liga 1. Because of his impression playing in Bhayangkara Awan he was called by Luis Milla to join Indonesia in Aceh World Solidarity (AWS) Cup 2017.

With Bhayangkara FC, Awan have won Piala Indonesia 2018 in December with a new record of clean sheet in competition.

== International career ==
Awan Setho represented Indonesia at the 2018 AFF Championship.

== Career statistics ==
=== Club ===
As of match played 22 August 2025

Club	Season	League			Cup		Continental		Other		Total	
Club	Season	Division	Apps	Goals	Apps	Goals	Apps	Goals	Apps	Goals	Apps	Goals
Bali United	2015	Indonesia Super League	0	0	0	0	–		0	0	0	0
Persip Pekalongan	2016	ISC B	6	0	0	0	–		0	0	6	0
Bhayangkara	2017	Liga 1	25	0	0	0	–		0	0	25	0
Bhayangkara	2018	Liga 1	20	0	0	0	–		1 (Note: Appearances in Indonesia President's Cup)	0	21	0
Bhayangkara	2019	Liga 1	17	0	2 (Note: Includes Piala Indonesia)	0	–		0	0	19	0
Bhayangkara	2020	Liga 1	3	0	0	0	–		0	0	3	0
Bhayangkara	2021–22	Liga 1	32	0	0	0	–		2 (Note: Appearances in Menpora Cup)	0	34	0
Bhayangkara	2022–23	Liga 1	28	0	0	0	–		4	0	32	0
Bhayangkara	2023–24	Liga 1	18	0	0	0	–		0	0	18	0
Bhayangkara	2024–25	Liga 2	21	0	0	0	–		0	0	21	0
Bhayangkara	2025–26	Super League	3	0	0	0	–		0	0	3	0
PSIS Semarang (loan)	2017	Liga 2	4	0	0	0	–		0	0	4	0
Career total			177	0	2	0	0	0	7	0	186	0

=== International ===
As of match played 15 June 2019

Appearances and goals by national team and year
National team	Year	Apps	Goals
Indonesia	2017	1	0
Indonesia	2018	2	0
Indonesia	2019	1	0
Total		4	0

== Honours ==
Bhayangkara

- Liga 1: 2017
- Liga 2 runner-up: 2024–25

Indonesia U-22

- AFF U-22 Youth Championship: 2019

Indonesia

- Aceh World Solidarity Cup runner-up: 2017
