= Evan Dimas =

Indonesian footballer (born 1995)

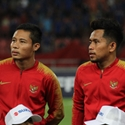
- Evan (left) with Andik at the 2018 AFF Championship

Personal information
- Full name: Evan Dimas Darmono
- Date of birth: 13 March 1995 (age 31)
- Place of birth: Surabaya, Indonesia
- Height: 1.67 m (5 ft 6 in)
- Position: Midfielder

Youth career
- 2005–2007: SSB Sasana Bhakti
- 2007–2010: SSB Mitra Surabaya
- 2010–2013: Persebaya Surabaya
- 2012: → Surabaya Muda (loan)

Senior career*
Years	Team	Apps	(Gls)
2014–2017	Persebaya (DU)	41	(6)
2018	Selangor	20	(2)
2019	Barito Putera	20	(2)
2020–2021	Persija Jakarta	2	(2)
2021–2022	Bhayangkara	22	(0)
2022–2024	Arema	36	(2)
2023–2024	→ PSIS Semarang (loan)	8	(1)
2024	Persik Kediri	1	(0)
Total		150	(15)

International career
2010–2012	Indonesia U16	2	(2)
2013–2014	Indonesia U19	30	(12)
2015–2019	Indonesia U23	32	(8)
2014–2022	Indonesia	44	(10)
Medal record
Men's football
Representing Indonesia
AFF U-19 Youth Championship
Winner	2013 Indonesia
Southeast Asian Games
Bronze medal – third place	2017 Kuala Lumpur	Team
Silver medal – second place	2019 Philippines	Team
AFF Championship
Runner-up	2016 Myanmar & Philippines	Team
Runner-up	2020 Singapore	Team
- * Club domestic league appearances and goals

Evan Dimas Darmono (born 13 March 1995) is an Indonesian former professional footballer who plays as a midfielder.

== Personal Life ==
Evan Dimas was born in the city of Surabaya in East Java province to a low-income family that once depended on his father Condro Darmono's job as a security guard. As one of the highest paid Indonesian footballers, Evan is now the breadwinner of his extensive family. He is a devout Muslim who celebrates every goal by performing the Sujud. He is currently also enrolled as a student at the Dr. Soetomo University, majoring in public administration.

His favorite player and inspiration is former Barcelona midfielder, Andrés Iniesta who showed diminutive players can also excel on the world level. He idolized Persebaya Surabaya during childhood and cut teeth in the club's youth team. He signed his first professional contract in 2014, when Indonesian football was complicated by the dualism of several clubs, with a faction of Persebaya that later became Bhayangkara.

== Club career ==
=== Youth ===
Evan Dimas trained at Surabaya soccer schools for boys until he entered Persebaya's youth team in 2010 at the age of 15. While at Persebaya, Evan became a regular member of the Indonesian national youth squads of various age levels. He also trained in Spain after being chosen with other Indonesian young players to visit Barcelona's training facilities. In 2012, he also attended the now-defunct Nike Academy, a program run by Nike Inc. that gathered promising teenage footballers from around the world.

=== Persebaya ISL (Bhayangkara) ===
After years of training in the Persebaya system, it was natural for Evan Dimas to enter the senior team of the club. However, when the youth star decided to become a professional player, Persebaya was embroiled in an internal schism derived from the 2011-2014 dualism of Indonesian football. Several top-flight clubs at that time split into two factions with one following the Indonesian Super League (ISL) while the other joining the short-lived Indonesian Premier League (LPI). Evan along with six other teenage players chose in November 2014 to join the ISL faction of Persebaya. After unification attempts in 2014-16 and a series of legal naming disputes, this team in 2016 turned into Bhayangkara with financial support from the Indonesian National Police.

As soon as Evan joined in November 2014, A-League club Brisbane Roar showed interest in hiring the midfielder on loan from Persebaya. However, a deal did not pan out. After months of tumult in Indonesian football that forced ISL to start its 2015 season in April, Evan made his debut for Persebaya on 5 April 2015 as a late substitute in a 1–0 victory against Mitra Kukar at Gelora Bung Tomo Stadium in Surabaya. However, Evan's much-anticipated entry into professional football was ruined by a government intervention to stop the ISL in May 2015. That intervention itself prompted FIFA to ban Indonesia from all authorized footballing activities for one year.

During the FIFA suspension, Persebaya initiated to send its young star to Spain where Evan can train and trial with several clubs, including Segunda Division club UE Llagostera and the B team of La Liga club RCD Espanyol. However, he failed to impress clubs there enough to hire him.

=== Bhayangkara FC ===
When Evan Dimas returned to Indonesia in mid-2016, the Persebaya club that he represented had lost in legal disputes and eventually renamed itself into Bhayangkara with the support of the Indonesian National Police. Evan joined the Bhayangkara team that participated in the 2016 Indonesia Soccer Championship A. The next year, with Evan at the heart of its midfield, Bhayangkara won the 2017 Liga 1 title, which was the first trophy in his professional career. This achievement led to offers from clubs abroad.

=== Selangor FA ===
On 2 December 2017, Evan signed a one-year contract with Malaysia Super League club Selangor on a free transfer, along with Indonesian compatriot Ilham Armaiyn. He made his first-team debut for Selangor when he was part of the starting lineup of a 2018 Malaysia Super League match against Kuala Lumpur on 4 February 2018, in which Selangor won. Evan scored his first league goal in the 2018 Malaysia Super League for Selangor in a 2–1 victory over PKNS at the Kuala Lumpur Stadium.

While he had a good season in his first year overseas with 20 appearances and two goals, Evan decided to return home at the end of the contract year.

=== Barito Putera ===
On 26 December 2018, Evan signed a one-year contract with Liga 1 side Barito Putera. Evan made his Barito Putera debut in the first leg Round of 32 2018–19 Piala Indonesia against PSS Sleman on 23 January 2019.

Evan made his first Liga 1 appearance on 20 May 2019, coming on as a starter in a 1–1 draw with Persija Jakarta at the 17th May Stadium. Evan scored his first league goal in the 2019 Liga 1 for Barito Putera in a 4–2 loss over Bhayangkara at the Patriot Stadium.

Although Evan played regularly and scored two goals in the 2019 Liga 1 season, he did not show the performance that grabbed attention and the national title in 2017. Barito languished at the 13th position when the season concluded and failed to keep Evan for another year.

=== Persija Jakarta ===
After weeks of speculation around which team would interest him, Evan signed for one of the richest clubs in Indonesia, Persija Jakarta, to play in the 2020 Liga 1.

Evan made his Persija debut in a 3–2 win against Borneo on 1 March 2020 as a substitute for Sandi Sute in the 19th minute, and he also scored his first goal for the team in the 86th minute. And then, that season ended after only three matches due to the COVID-19 pandemic. Evan only played in two games but managed to score two goals, which was the same amount in his 20 appearances in Selangor and Barito respectively. There was high expectation that Evan finally found a team that could showcase his talent.

=== Return to Bhayangkara FC ===
That expectation failed to pan out due to the canceled 2020 season and Persija's failure to keep Evan for another year. In early 2021, Evan decided to re-join former club Bhayangkara, signing a one-year contract. Evan made his Bhayangkara debut in a 2–1 win against Persiraja Banda Aceh on 29 August 2021 as a substitute for Wahyu Suboseto in the 76th minute. He played the full 90 minutes in a 1–2 win against Bali United on 23 October.

He played the full 90 minutes in the won to Persikabo 1973 on 20 February 2022, where he registered one assist. He made 22 appearances for Bhayangkara during the season, without scoring.

=== Arema ===
On 5 April 2022, Evan signed contract for Arema. He made his league debut in a 0–3 loss against Borneo Samarinda on 24 July at Segiri Stadium. On 7 December, Evan scored his first goal for Arema in a 2–0 win over Dewa United, where he scored with a header in the 70th minute. Evan give assists a goal by Dedik Setiawan in Arema's 2–0 win over Persita Tangerang on 17 December.

On 27 March 2023, Evan scored in a 3–1 home lose against Bali United at PTIK Stadium.

==== PSIS Semarang (loan) ====
On 14 November 2023, Evan was loaned to PSIS Semarang for the remainder of the season. On 3 March 2024, Evan scored his debut goal for the club against Persik Kediri in a 2–1 win.

==== Persik Kediri ====
Evan signed with Persik at the start of 2024-25 season. He only made one appearace at Persik, coming on as a subtitute and played for just 22 minutes in a match against PSBS Biak where Persik lost 0-1. The club announced his departure in January 2025.

== International career ==
In 2010, Evan Dimas was hailed as a standout talent in Indonesia. A playmaking midfielder of the country's national youth teams from the age of 15, he captained the Indonesia U-17 and Indonesia U-19 that won the 2012 HKFA International Youth Invitation, 2013 HKFA International Youth Invitation and 2013 AFF U-19 Youth Championship. He scored five goals in the 2013 AFF U-19 Youth Championship and became the top scorer for Indonesia U-19 in this tournament. He scored two goals in the 2013 HKFA International Youth Invitation.

In October 2013, he led the Indonesia U-19 team to qualify for the 2014 AFC U-19 Championship, a qualification competition for the 2015 FIFA U-20 World Cup, after topping Group G in the qualification with three wins in three matches, including a 3–2 win over defending champion South Korea U-19. He scored four goals in the qualifications, including a hattrick against South Korea U-19. As preparation for the 2014 AFC U-19 Championship, he played for twelve unofficial matches, including 2014 Hassanal Bolkiah Trophy, and one FIFA official match with the U-19 national team, in which he played in all those matches. Unfortunately, he failed to help Indonesia U-19 to secure a place in the 2015 FIFA U-20 World Cup, after losing all three matches in the 2014 AFC U-19 Championship. Nonetheless, his stellar performance in the youth Garuda teams led to the hype ahead of his decision on how to enter professional football.

Evan made his senior debut with Indonesia on 11 November 2014 at the age of 19 in an unofficial friendly against Timor Leste, in which he also scored. He made his official international debut on 28 November 2014, against Laos, scoring his first international goal and making one assist in a 2014 AFF Championship match. He became captain of the senior team in May 2021. Despite already debuting for the senior national team, he was still called to the Indonesia U-23 team and played in a 1–1 draw against Syria U-23 on 10 February 2015. He then continued to play four times with the Indonesia U-23 team in 2015, for their preparation for the 2016 AFC U-23 Championship qualification and 2015 Southeast Asian Games. He played in the 2016 AFC U-23 Championship qualification, playing three times and scoring one goal. He played in the 2015 Southeast Asian Games five times, scoring four goals. He was part of the Indonesia team that won bronze in the 2017 Southeast Asian Games.

Evan was called into Indonesia's friendly match squad against Mauritius on 11 September 2018 by Danurwindo, In that match, Evan scored the decisive goal for the national team's victory. A year later, On 15 June 2019, he scored a brace in a 6–0 win over Vanuatu in a friendly match. Six months later, he also was part of the Indonesia team that won silver in the 2019 Southeast Asian Games in the Philippines. In the final, he had to leave the game with a serious injury after Đoàn Văn Hậu aggressively tackled him.

== Post-retirement Career ==
Evan received offers to play and become an assistant coach from various clubs after being released from Persik, but he eventually moved to Tulungagung to become a coach, focusing on youth and grassroot football which effectively ended his professional career. He occasionally still plays non-competitive local football.

== Career statistics ==
=== Club ===
As of 28 September 2024

Club	Season	League			Cup (Note: Includes Piala Indonesia, Malaysia FA Cup)		Continental		Other (Note: Appearances in Piala Presiden)		Total	
Club	Season	Division	Apps	Goals	Apps	Goals	Apps	Goals	Apps	Goals	Apps	Goals
Bhayangkara	2015	ISL	2	0	0	0	–		5	0	7	0
Bhayangkara	2016	ISC A	19	5	0	0	–		0	0	19	5
Bhayangkara	2017	Liga 1	20	1	0	0	–		4	1	24	2
Bhayangkara	Total		41	6	0	0	–		9	1	50	7
Selangor	2018	MSL	20	2	5	0	–		0	0	25	2
Barito Putera	2019	Liga 1	20	2	0	0	–		1	1	21	3
Persija Jakarta	2020	Liga 1	2	2	0	0	–		0	0	2	2
Bhayangkara	2021–22	Liga 1	22	0	0	0	–		3 (Note: Appearances in Menpora Cup)	0	25	0
Arema	2022–23	Liga 1	30	2	0	0	–		7	0	37	2
Arema	2023–24	Liga 1	6	0	0	0	–		0	0	6	0
Arema	Total		36	2	0	0	—		7	0	43	2
PSIS Semarang (loan)	2023–24	Liga 1	8	1	0	0	–		0	0	8	1
Persik Kediri	2024–25	Liga 1	1	0	0	0	–		0	0	1	0
Career total			150	15	5	0	0	0	20	2	175	17

=== International appearances ===
As of match played 27 January 2022

Appearances and goals by national team and year
National team	Year	Apps	Goals
Indonesia	2014	2	2
Indonesia	2016	8	0
Indonesia	2017	3	0
Indonesia	2018	8	1
Indonesia	2019	6	2
Indonesia	2021	15	5
Indonesia	2022	2	0
Total		44	10

=== International goals ===
No.	Date	Venue	Opponent	Score	Result	Competition
1.	11 November 2014	Gelora Bung Karno Stadium, Jakarta, Indonesia	Timor-Leste	3–0	4–0	Friendly
2.	28 November 2014	Hàng Đẫy Stadium, Hanoi, Vietnam	Laos	1–0	5–1	2014 AFF Championship
3.	11 September 2018	Wibawa Mukti Stadium, Cikarang, Indonesia	Mauritius	1–0	1–0	Friendly
4.	15 June 2019	Gelora Bung Karno Stadium, Jakarta, Indonesia	Vanuatu	2–0	6–0	Friendly
5.	15 June 2019	Gelora Bung Karno Stadium, Jakarta, Indonesia	Vanuatu	6–0	6–0	Friendly
6.	29 May 2021	The Sevens Stadium, Dubai, United Arab Emirates	Oman	1–1	1–3	Friendly
7.	3 June 2021	Al Maktoum Stadium, Dubai, United Arab Emirates	Thailand	2–2	2–2	2022 FIFA World Cup qualification
8.	7 October 2021	Buriram Stadium, Buriram, Thailand	Chinese Taipei	2–0	2–1	2023 AFC Asian Cup qualification
9.	9 December 2021	Bishan Stadium, Bishan, Singapore	Cambodia	2–0	4–2	2020 AFF Championship
10.	12 December 2021	Bishan Stadium, Bishan, Singapore	Laos	5–1	5–1	2020 AFF Championship

== Honours ==
Bhayangkara

- Liga 1: 2017

Arema

- Piala Presiden: 2022

Indonesia U-19

- AFF U-19 Youth Championship: 2013

Indonesia U-23

- SEA Games silver medal: 2019; bronze medal: 2017

Indonesia

- AFF Championship runner-up: 2016, 2020
- Aceh World Solidarity Cup runner-up: 2017

Individual

- Indonesia Soccer Championship A Best Young Player: 2016
- Indonesia Soccer Championship A Best XI: 2016

Preceded by Andritany Ardhiyasa	Indonesian Captain; 2021–2022	Succeeded by Fachruddin Aryanto
