= Muhammad Hargianto =

Indonesian footballer (born 1996)

Personal information
- Full name: Muhammad Hargianto
- Date of birth: 24 July 1996 (age 30)
- Place of birth: Jakarta, Indonesia
- Height: 1.68 m (5 ft 6 in)
- Position: Midfielder

Team information
- Current team: Semen Padang
- Number: 8

Youth career
- 2004: SSB Banteng Muda
- 2009: SSB Rajawali Muda
- 2010: IFA
- 2012–2014: Diklat Ragunan

Senior career*
Years	Team	Apps	(Gls)
2014–2025	Bhayangkara	169	(11)
2017	→ Persija Jakarta (loan)	16	(0)
2025–2026	Barito Putera	15	(0)
2026–	Semen Padang	1	(0)

International career
2011–2012	Indonesia U16	5	(1)
2013–2014	Indonesia U19	23	(7)
2015–2018	Indonesia U23	14	(3)
2017–2018	Indonesia	6	(0)
Medal record
Men's football
Representing Indonesia
AFF U-19 Youth Championship
Winner	2013 Indonesia
Southeast Asian Games
Bronze medal – third place	2017 Kuala Lumpur	Team
- * Club domestic league appearances and goals as of 13 September 2026

Muhammad Hargianto (born 24 July 1996) is an Indonesian professional footballer who plays as a midfielder for Championship club Semen Padang. He is also a Second Police Brigadier in the Indonesian National Police.

== Club career ==
=== Persebaya ISL (Bhayangkara) ===
On November 11, 2014, he signed a four-year contract with Persebaya ISL (Bhayangkara). He made his debut on 8 April 2015 as starting line-up, which ended 1–1 against Pusamania Borneo at Gelora Bung Tomo Stadium.

==== Persija Jakarta (loan) ====
In 2017, Hargianto joined Liga 1 club Persija Jakarta on loan from Bhayangkara. He made his league debut on 30 April 2017 in a match against PSM Makassar at the Andi Mattalatta Stadium, Makassar.

== International career ==
In August 2011, Hargianto was called up to the Indonesia U16 for 2012 AFC U-16 Championship qualification in Thailand. On 12 September 2011, He debuted in a youth national team when he coming as a starting in a 4–1 win against Myanmar U16 in the 2012 AFC U-16 Championship qualification. He also scored his first goal in 8th minute. Hargianto made his international debut for senior team on 21 March 2017, against Myanmar.

== Career statistics ==
=== Club ===
As of match played 13 September 2026

Club	Season	League			Cup (Note: Includes Piala Indonesia)		Continental		Other		Total	
Club	Season	Division	Apps	Goals	Apps	Goals	Apps	Goals	Apps	Goals	Apps	Goals
Bhayangkara	2015	Indonesia Super League	1	0	0	0	–		0	0	1	0
Bhayangkara	2016	ISC A	31	3	0	0	–		0	0	31	3
Bhayangkara	2018	Liga 1	20	1	0	0	–		0	0	20	1
Bhayangkara	2019	Liga 1	21	0	2	1	–		0	0	23	1
Bhayangkara	2020	Liga 1	1	0	0	0	–		0	0	1	0
Bhayangkara	2021–22	Liga 1	25	3	0	0	–		1 (Note: Appearances in Menpora Cup)	0	26	3
Bhayangkara	2022–23	Liga 1	26	2	0	0	–		4 (Note: Appearances in Indonesia President's Cup)	0	30	2
Bhayangkara	2023–24	Liga 1	26	0	0	0	–		0	0	26	0
Bhayangkara	2024–25	Liga 2	18	2	0	0	–		0	0	18	2
Persija Jakarta (loan)	2017	Liga 1	16	0	0	0	–		0	0	16	0
Barito Putera	2025–26	Championship	15	0	0	0	0	0	0	0	15	0
Semen Padang	2026–27	Championship	1	0	0	0	0	0	0	0	1	0
Career total			201	11	2	1	0	0	5	0	208	12

=== International ===
As of match played 13 November 2018

Appearances and goals by national team and year
National team	Year	Apps	Goals
Indonesia	2017	4	0
Indonesia	2018	2	0
Total		6	0

=== International under-23 goals ===
#	Date	Venue	Opponent	Score	Result	Competition
1.	17 August 2017	Shah Alam Stadium, Shah Alam, Malaysia	Philippines	2–0	3–0	2017 Southeast Asian Games
2.	21 March 2018	Jalan Besar Stadium, Kallang, Singapore	Singapore	3–0	3–0	Friendly Match
3.	13 August 2018	Patriot Chandrabhaga Stadium, Bekasi, Indonesia	Chinese Taipei	1–0	3–0	2018 Asian Games

== Honours ==
=== Club ===
Bhayangkara

- Liga 2 runner-up: 2024–25

=== International ===
Indonesia U-19

- AFF U-19 Youth Championship: 2013

Indonesia U-23

- SEA Games bronze medal: 2017

Indonesia

- Aceh World Solidarity Cup runner-up: 2017
