= Dany Saputra =

Indonesian association football player

Personal information
- Full name: Dany Saputra
- Date of birth: 1 January 1991 (age 35)
- Place of birth: Kediri, Indonesia
- Height: 1.74 m (5 ft 9 in)
- Position: Left back

Youth career
- –2009: SSB Binatama
- 2009–2010: Persik Kediri

Senior career*
Years	Team	Apps	(Gls)
2010–2011	Persenga Nganjuk	11	(0)
2011–2012	Persedikab Kediri	10	(0)
2012–2013	Persebaya 1927	0	(0)
2013	→ Mojokerto Putra (loan)	10	(0)
2013–2014	Persija Jakarta	17	(0)
2015–2017	Bhayangkara	39	(0)
2018–2019	Persija Jakarta	10	(0)
2018	→ Bhayangkara (loan)	18	(0)
2020–2023	Persik Kediri	24	(0)
2023–2024	Persita Tangerang	2	(0)
2024–2025	Persiku Kudus	13	(0)

International career
2012–2014	Indonesia U23	11	(0)
2014	Indonesia	1	(0)
- * Club domestic league appearances and goals as of 17:49, 1 February 2025 (UTC)

Dany Saputra (born 1 January 1991) is an Indonesian former footballer who last played as a left back for Persiku Kudus.

== Club career ==
=== Persija Jakarta ===
At the end of December 2013, he was officially recruited by Persija Jakarta after undergoing a trial match. He made his league debut on 8 May 2014 in an Old Indonesia derby against Persib Bandung at the Jalak Harupat Stadium, Bandung.

=== Persebaya United / Surabaya United /Bhayangkara ===
In December 2014, Dany signed with Persebaya United (Bhayangkara) for the 2015 Indonesia Super League. He made his league debut on 5 April 2015 in a 1–0 win against Mitra Kukar at the Gelora Bung Tomo Stadium, Surabaya. Dany only made 2 appearances for the club because this season was officially discontinued by PSSI on 2 May 2015 due to a ban by Imam Nahrawi, Minister of Youth and Sports Affairs, against PSSI to run any football competition.

In 2016, Dany's club renamed as Indonesian National Police Surabaya United. He made his official new league Liga 1 debut on 20 April 2017 in a 2–1 win against Badak Lampung at the Gelora Bung Tomo Stadium, Surabaya.

=== Return to Persija Jakarta ===
On 19 December 2017, Dany decided to re-join former club Persija Jakarta, signing a two-year contract. Dany made his league debut in a 0–0 draw against Bhayangkara on 23 March 2018.

==== Loan to Bhayangkara ====
On 9 July 2018, Dany decided to re-join Bhayangkara on loan from Persija Jakarta for the 2018 season. Dany made his league debut for Bhayangkara on 21 July 2018 in a 2–3 away win against Bali United at the Kapten I Wayan Dipta Stadium, Gianyar.

==== Return to Persija Jakarta ====
After his loan ended with Bhayangkara and he returned to Persija Jakarta, the injury that happened to him made him not perform optimally with Bhayangkara. On 22 June 2019, Dany made his new league season debut for Persija in a 0–0 away draw against Persela Lamongan at the Surajaya Stadium, Lamongan

=== Persik Kediri ===
He was signed for Persik Kediri to play in Liga 1 in the 2020 season. This season was suspended on 27 March 2020 due to the COVID-19 pandemic. The season was abandoned and was declared void on 20 January 2021.

== International career ==
In 2014, Dany Saputra represented the Indonesia U-23, in the 2014 Asian Games. Dany made his international debut on 15 May 2014, in a 1–1 draw against Dominican Republic.

== Honours ==
Bhayangkara

- Liga 1: 2017

Persija Jakarta

- Indonesia President's Cup: 2018
- Piala Indonesia runner-up: 2018–19
