= Lee Yu-jun =

South Korean footballer

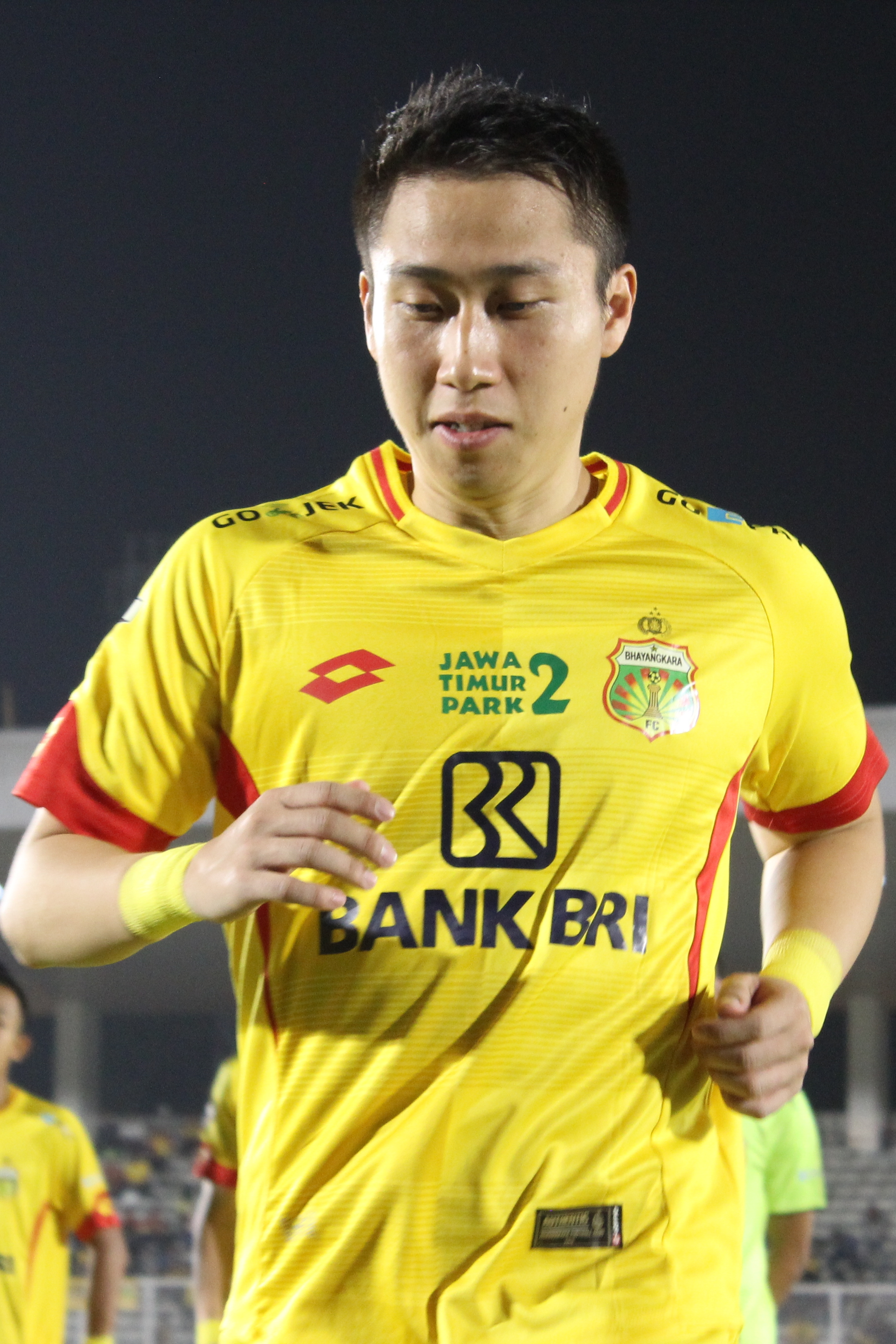
- Lee playing for Bhayangkara in 2019

Personal information
- Full name: Lee Yu-jun
- Birth name: Lee Jong-in
- Date of birth: 26 September 1989 (age 37)
- Place of birth: Seoul, South Korea
- Height: 1.75 m (5 ft 9 in)
- Position: Defensive midfielder

Team information
- Current team: RANS Nusantara
- Number: 89

Youth career
- 2002–2003: Osan Middle School
- 2004–2005: School Team SK

Senior career*
Years	Team	Apps	(Gls)
2007	Americano	0	(0)
2008–2009	Madureira	2	(0)
2010	Rio Claro	0	(0)
2010	Sorocaba	7	(0)
2010–2011	Americano	3	(0)
2011	Juventude	3	(0)
2012	Icheon Citizen	15	(2)
2013–2014	Gangwon	12	(0)
2015	Icheon Citizen	4	(0)
2016	Chungju Hummel	1	(0)
2016–2022	Bhayangkara	126	(6)
2022–2023	Madura United	31	(0)
2023–2025	Persela Lamongan	32	(1)
2025–2026	Sumsel United	13	(0)
2026–	RANS Nusantara	0	(0)
- * Club domestic league appearances and goals as of 2 May 2026

- Lee Yu-jun
- Hangul: 이유준
- RR: I Yujun
- MR: I Yujun

Lee Yu-jun (Korean: 이유준; born 26 September 1989) is a South Korean professional footballer who plays as a defensive midfielder for Championship side RANS Nusantara.

== Early life ==
He was also known as Lee Jong-in both in Brazil and South Korea before he changed his name legally to Lee Yu-jun.

== Club career ==
Born in South Korea, he lived in Brazil for 9 years since 2002 and played football there for 5 years. He started his professional career in 2007. On 17 August 2016, he decided to sign a contract with Bhayangkara. On 9 May 2022, Lee was signed for Madura United to play in Liga 1 in the 2022–23 season.

== Personal life ==
Born and raised in South Korea, he acquired Indonesian citizenship in 2022.

== Career statistics ==
=== Club ===
As of match played 2 May 2026

Club	Season	League		Cup (Note: Includes Korean FA Cup, Piala Indonesia)		Continental		Other (Note: Appearances in Indonesia President's Cup)		Total	
Club	Season	Apps	Goals	Apps	Goals	Apps	Goals	Apps	Goals	Apps	Goals
Icheon Citizen	2012	15	2	0	0	0	0	0	0	15	2
Gangwon	2013	10	0	1	0	0	0	0	0	11	0
Gangwon	2014	2	0	0	0	0	0	0	0	2	0
Gangwon	Total	12	0	1	0	0	0	0	0	13	0
Icheon Citizen	2015	4	0	0	0	0	0	0	0	4	0
Chungju Hummel	2016	1	0	0	0	0	0	0	0	1	0
Bhayangkara	2016	17	2	0	0	0	0	0	0	17	2
Bhayangkara	2017	32	1	0	0	0	0	4	0	36	1
Bhayangkara	2018	32	0	0	0	0	0	3	0	35	0
Bhayangkara	2019	26	3	2	1	0	0	2	0	30	4
Bhayangkara	2020	0	0	0	0	0	0	0	0	0	0
Bhayangkara	2021–22	19	0	0	0	0	0	1 (Note: Appearances in Menpora Cup)	0	20	0
Bhayangkara	Total	126	6	2	1	0	0	10	0	138	7
Madura United	2022–23	31	0	0	0	0	0	0	0	31	0
Persela Lamongan	2023–24	17	1	0	0	0	0	0	0	17	1
Persela Lamongan	2024–25	15	0	0	0	0	0	0	0	15	0
Persela Lamongan	Total	32	1	0	0	0	0	10	0	32	1
Sumsel United	2025–26	13	0	0	0	0	0	0	0	13	0
Career total		234	9	3	1	0	0	10	0	247	10

== Honours ==
=== Club ===
Bhayangkara

- Liga 1: 2017
