= Teuku Ichsan =

Indonesian footballer

Personal information
- Full name: Teuku Muhammad Ichsan
- Date of birth: 25 November 1997 (age 28)
- Place of birth: Bireuën, Indonesia
- Height: 1.76 m (5 ft 9 in)
- Position: Midfielder

Team information
- Current team: Bhayangkara
- Number: 19

Youth career
- SSB Brata
- 2016: Bhayangkara

Senior career*
Years	Team	Apps	(Gls)
2017–	Bhayangkara	108	(3)

International career
2014	Indonesia U19	1	(0)
2019	Indonesia	1	(0)
- * Club domestic league appearances and goals as of 5 September 2026

Teuku Muhammad Ichsan (born 25 November 1997), commonly known as TM Ichsan, is an Indonesian professional footballer who plays as a midfielder for Super League club Bhayangkara.

== Club career ==
=== Bhayangkara ===
He made his debut in a match against Persegres Gresik United in the Liga 1. On 7 May 2017, Ichsan made his debut with a goal in the 79th minute against Gresik United.

== International career ==
He made his debut for the Indonesia in the 2022 FIFA World Cup qualification against Malaysia on 19 November 2019.

== Career statistics ==
=== Club ===
As of match played 5 September 2026

Club	Season	League			Cup		Continental		Other (Note: Appearances in Indonesia President's Cup)		Total	
Club	Season	Division	Apps	Goals	Apps	Goals	Apps	Goals	Apps	Goals	Apps	Goals
Bhayangkara	2017	Liga 1	16	1	0	0	–		0	0	16	1
Bhayangkara	2018	Liga 1	4	1	0	0	–		3	0	7	1
Bhayangkara	2019	Liga 1	15	0	0	0	–		1	0	16	0
Bhayangkara	2020	Liga 1	3	0	0	0	–		0	0	3	0
Bhayangkara	2021–22	Liga 1	16	0	0	0	–		3 (Note: Appearances in Menpora Cup)	0	19	0
Bhayangkara	2022–23	Liga 1	20	0	0	0	–		0	0	20	0
Bhayangkara	2023–24	Liga 1	1	0	0	0	–		0	0	1	0
Bhayangkara	2024–25	Liga 2	16	1	0	0	–		0	0	16	1
Bhayangkara	2025–26	Super League	16	0	0	0	–		0	0	16	0
Bhayangkara	2026–27	Super League	1	0	0	0	–		0	0	1	0
Career total			108	3	0	0	0	0	7	0	115	3

=== International appearances ===
As of 19 November 2019

Appearances and goals by national team and year
National team	Year	Apps	Goals
Indonesia	2019	1	0
Total		1	0

== Honours ==
=== Club ===
Bhayangkara

- Liga 1: 2017

Bhayangkara

- Liga 2 runner-up: 2024–25
