= Wahyu Tri Nugroho =

Indonesian footballer

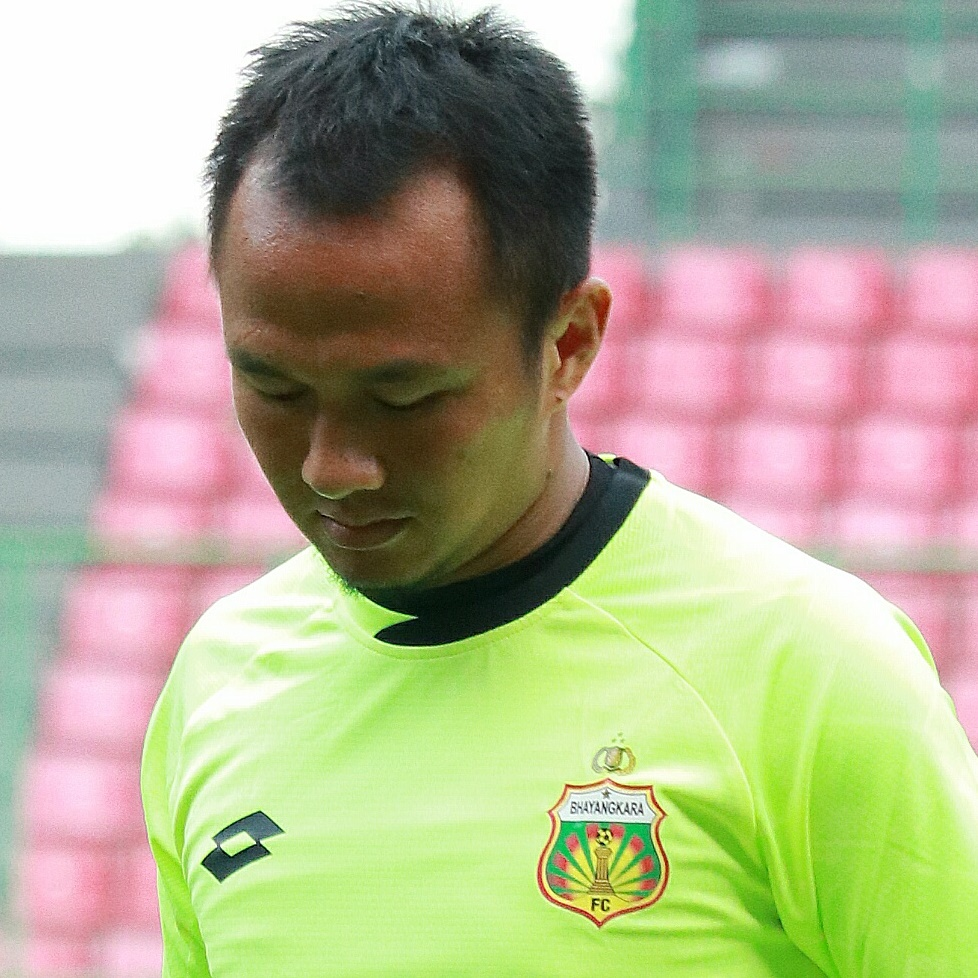
- Wahyu with Bhayangkara in 2019

Personal information
- Full name: Wahyu Tri Nugroho
- Date of birth: 27 July 1986 (age 40)
- Place of birth: Surakarta, Indonesia
- Height: 1.70 m (5 ft 7 in)
- Position: Goalkeeper

Senior career*
Years	Team	Apps	(Gls)
2004–2006	Persiba Bantul	30	(0)
2006–2009	Persis Solo	66	(0)
2009–2016	Persiba Bantul	105	(0)
2016–2022	Bhayangkara	50	(0)
2021	→ Persis Solo (loan)	10	(0)
2022–2023	PSIS Semarang	10	(0)
2023–2024	PSIM Yogyakarta	2	(0)
Total		273	(0)

International career
2012	Indonesia	4	(0)
- * Club domestic league appearances and goals

Wahyu Tri Nugroho (born 27 July 1986) is an Indonesian former footballer who last played as a goalkeeper for PSIM Yogyakarta.

== International career ==
Wahyu Tri Nugroho receives his first senior international cap against Laos on 25 November 2012.

International appearances and goals
#	Date	Venue	Opponent	Result	Competition	Goal
2012
1	16 November	Gelora Bung Karno Stadium, Jakarta, Indonesia	Cameroon	0-0	Friendly	
2	25 November	Bukit Jalil National Stadium, Kuala Lumpur, Malaysia	Laos	2–2	2012 AFF Suzuki Cup	
3	28 November	Bukit Jalil National Stadium, Kuala Lumpur, Malaysia	Singapore	1–0	2012 AFF Suzuki Cup	
4	1 December	Bukit Jalil National Stadium, Kuala Lumpur, Malaysia	Malaysia	0–2	2012 AFF Suzuki Cup	

== Honours ==
=== Club ===
Persiba Bantul

- Liga Indonesia Premier Division: 2010–11

Bhayangkara

- Liga 1: 2017

Persis Solo

- Liga 2: 2021

=== Individual ===
- Indonesia Soccer Championship A Best XI: 2016
