= Central Asia Insurance =

Company of Indonesia

Asuransi Central Asia
- Type: Private
- Industry: general insurance
- Founded: 1956
- Headquarters: Slipi, Jakarta, Indonesia
- Number of locations: 76 Office and Representative
- Key people: Juliati Boddhiya (CEO)
- Number of employees: 1400+
- Subsidiaries: PT AsuransiJiwa Central Asia Raya dan Entitas Anak / Subsidiary (99.99%) - Life Insurance PT Central Asia Financial (12.06%) - Life Insurance PT Asuransi Harta Aman Pratama Tbk (62.15%) - General Insurance

Central Asia Insurance (Indonesian: Asuransi Central Asia) is an insurance company of Indonesia. It has 76 branch offices and representative offices around Indonesia.

The ACA company was established in 1956 with the name Oriental NV. On 5 August 1958 it was renamed "PT. Asuransi Central Asia".

The company has 1400+ employees. In December 2022, ACA's capital will reach IDR 6.92 trillion with a Solvency Achievement Ratio of 324.42%. This value far exceeds the government's requirement of only 120%.
