= Thiago Furtuoso =

Brazilian footballer

Personal information
- Full name: Thiago Furtuoso dos Santos
- Date of birth: 8 June 1987 (age 39)
- Place of birth: Carapicuiba, Sao Paulo, Brazil
- Position: Forward

Senior career*
Years	Team	Apps	(Gls)
2008	Guaratinguetá	5	(3)
2009	Santa Cruz RS	8	(5)
2009–2012	Grêmio Osasco	52	(25)
2013	Itumbiara	24	(11)
2014	Vitória das Tabocas	8	(3)
2014	CSA	11	(7)
2015	Surabaya United	28	(16)
2016	Velo Clube	8	(5)
= 2016–2017	Bhayangkara	38	(21)
2017	Madura United	14	(9)
2018	Arema	11	(5)
2018–2019	Al-Nahda	14	(8)
2019	Jeddah	16	(7)
2019–2020	Othellos Athienou	7	(1)
2020	Kalamata	3	(0)
Total		247	(126)

International career
2008	Brazil U20	19	(14)
- * Club domestic league appearances and goals

Thiago Furtuoso dos Santos (born 8 June 1987) is a Brazilian former professional footballer who played as a forward.

== Career ==
On 26 July 2019, Furtuoso moved to Cyprus and signed with Cypriot Second Division club Othellos Athienou.
