= Otávio Dutra =

Indonesian footballer (born 1983)

Personal information
- Full name: Otávio Dutra
- Date of birth: 22 November 1983 (age 42)
- Place of birth: Fortaleza, Brazil
- Height: 1.90 m (6 ft 3 in)
- Position: Centre-back

Team information
- Current team: Persekabpas Pasuruan
- Number: 5

Youth career
- 2000–2001: Juventus da Mooca
- 2001–2003: Corinthians
- 2003–2004: Noroeste

Senior career*
Years	Team	Apps	(Gls)
2004–2005	Noroeste	16	(0)
2005	→ Francisco Beltrão (loan)	4	(0)
2006	Toledo	2	(0)
2006	Legião	20	(0)
2007	Pogoń Szczecin	11	(0)
2007–2009	Macaé	45	(3)
2010–2012	Persebaya 1927	52	(3)
2013	Persipura Jayapura	31	(10)
2014	Gresik United	19	(4)
2015–2018	Bhayangkara	64	(12)
2018–2019	Persebaya Surabaya	45	(3)
2020–2023	Persija Jakarta	19	(2)
2023	Madura United	8	(0)
2023	Kalteng Putra	8	(1)
2023–2024	PSBS Biak	10	(1)
2024–2025	Persibo Bojonegoro	20	(2)
2025	Persela Lamongan	8	(0)
2026	PSIS Semarang	12	(2)
2026–	Persekabpas Pasuruan	0	(0)

International career
2019	Indonesia	2	(0)
- * Club domestic league appearances and goals as of 3 May 2026

Otávio Dutra (born 22 November 1983) is a professional footballer who plays as a centre-back for Liga Nusantara club Persekabpas Pasuruan. Born in Brazil, he has represented the Indonesia national team.

== Club career ==
=== Persipura Jayapura ===
In October 2012, Dutra officially joined Persipura Jayapura. At Persipura, he became defender with Bio Paulin. During the 2013 Indonesia Super League season, Dutra was the leagues highest scoring defender. Persipura won the league championship that season.

=== Persegres Gresik United ===
In December 2013, Dutra signed a one-year contract with Persegres Gresik United at a cost of Rp 2 billion. He made his debut on 3 February 2014 in a match against Persik Kediri. On 25 February 2014, Dutra scored his first goal for Gresik United against Barito Putera in the 28th minute at the Petrokimia Stadium, Gresik.

=== Bhayangkara ===
In 2015, Dutra joined Bhayangkara in the 2016 Indonesia Soccer Championship A and made his debut against Barito Putera in the first week. In his debut match, Dutra made his first goal from the penalty kick in a draw 1–1.

In the sixth week, he scored one goal against Persib Bandung. The goal was scored in the 64th minute in a home win 4–1.

=== Persebaya Surabaya ===
On 6 January 2018, He signed a year contract with Persebaya Surabaya for 2018 Liga 1. He made his debut in a 1–0 home win against Badak Lampung on 25 March 2018.

On 17 December 2018, he renewed contract with Persebaya Surabaya On 11 May 2019, Dutra suffered an injury during Persebaya friendly match against Persela Lamongan before the 2019 Liga 1 starts on 11 May 2019. Dutra only played for 37 minutes due to a broken nose after colliding with a Persela's player. As a result, Dutra only rested less than two months. He also had to wear face shields. Dutra returned from a broken nose bone injury that struck him. He made his debut in a 3–2 home win against Persela Lamongan at the Gelora Bung Tomo Stadium on 1 July 2019. he appeared wearing a face mask in the sixth week of the match. He told that he still had problems having to wear a mask throughout the match.

=== Persija Jakarta ===
On 1 January 2020, He signed two years contract with Indonesian Liga 1 side Persija Jakarta. This season was suspended on 27 March 2020 due to the COVID-19 pandemic. The season was abandoned and was declared void on 20 January 2021.

=== Madura United ===
On 29 January 2023, Dutra signed a contract with Liga 1 club Madura United from Persija Jakarta. Dutra made his league debut for the club in a 2–3 lose against Persis Solo.

== International career ==
Born in Brazil, he renounced Brazilian citizenship, and become an Indonesian citizen (WNI). He has taken an oath or pledge of allegiance to the Unitary State of the Republic of Indonesia (NKRI) as a condition of naturalization. He made his debut for the Indonesia in the 2022 FIFA World Cup qualification against Vietnam on 15 October 2019.

== Career statistics ==
=== Club ===
As of 3 May 2026

Club	Season	League			Cup		Continental		Other (Note: Appearances in Indonesia President's Cup)		Total	
Club	Season	Division	Apps	Goals	Apps	Goals	Apps	Goals	Apps	Goals	Apps	Goals
Persebaya 1927	2011	Indonesian Premier League	18	0	0	0	0	0	0	0	18	0
Persebaya 1927	2011–12	Indonesian Premier League	22	3	0	0	0	0	0	0	22	3
Persebaya 1927	Total		40	3	0	0	0	0	0	0	40	3
Persipura Jayapura	2013	Indonesia Super League	31	10	0	0	0	0	0	0	31	10
Persegres Gresik	2014	Indonesia Super League	19	4	0	0	0	0	0	0	19	4
Bhayangkara	2015	Indonesia Super League	2	0	0	0	0	0	5	0	7	0
Bhayangkara	2016	Indonesia Soccer Championship A	33	6	0	0	0	0	0	0	33	6
Bhayangkara	2017	Liga 1	29	6	0	0	0	0	4	0	33	6
Bhayangkara	Total		64	12	0	0	0	0	9	0	73	12
Persebaya Surabaya	2018	Liga 1	23	2	0	0	0	0	4	0	27	2
Persebaya Surabaya	2019	Liga 1	22	1	1 (Note: Includes Piala Indonesia)	1	0	0	6	1	29	3
Persebaya Surabaya	Total		45	3	1	1	0	0	10	1	56	5
Persija Jakarta	2020	Liga 1	1	1	0	0	0	0	0	0	1	1
Persija Jakarta	2021–22	Liga 1	18	1	0	0	0	0	6 (Note: Appearances in Menpora Cup)	0	24	1
Persija Jakarta	2022–23	Liga 1	0	0	0	0	–		0	0	0	0
Madura United	2022–23	Liga 1	8	0	0	0	–		0	0	8	0
Kalteng Putra	2023–24	Liga 2	8	1	0	0	–		0	0	8	1
PSBS Biak	2023–24	Liga 2	10	1	0	0	–		0	0	10	1
Persibo Bojonegoro	2024–25	Liga 2	20	2	0	0	–		0	0	20	2
Persela Lamongan	2025–26	Championship	8	0	0	0	–		0	0	8	0
PSIS Semarang	2025–26	Championship	12	2	0	0	–		0	0	12	2
Career total			282	40	1	1	0	0	25	1	310	42

=== International appearances ===
As of 19 November 2019

Appearances and goals by national team and year
National team	Year	Apps	Goals
Indonesia	2019	2	0
Total		2	0

== Honours ==
=== Club ===
Persebaya Surabaya

- Liga Primer Indonesia: 2011
- Unity Cup: 2011
- Indonesia Premier League runner-up: 2011–12
- Indonesia President's Cup runner-up: 2019
- Liga 1 runner-up: 2019

Persipura Jayapura

- Indonesian Super League: 2013

Bhayangkara

- Liga 1: 2017

Persija Jakarta

- Menpora Cup: 2021

PSBS Biak

- Liga 2: 2023–24

== See also ==
- List of Indonesia international footballers born outside Indonesia
