= Putu Gede =

Indonesian footballer (born 1995)

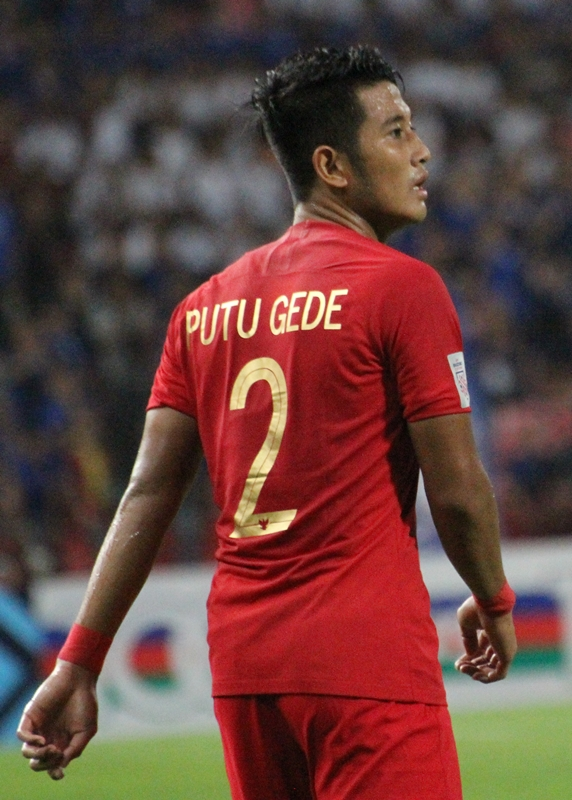
- Putu Gede with Indonesia in 2018

Personal information
- Full name: I Putu Gede Juni Antara
- Date of birth: 7 June 1995 (age 31)
- Place of birth: Gianyar, Indonesia
- Height: 1.76 m (5 ft 9 in)
- Position: Right-back

Team information
- Current team: Bhayangkara
- Number: 2

Youth career
- 2011–2013: Diklat Ragunan

Senior career*
Years	Team	Apps	(Gls)
2014–2023	Bhayangkara	153	(2)
2023	Persib Bandung	14	(0)
2023–	Bhayangkara	44	(0)

International career
2011	Indonesia U16	3	(0)
2013–2014	Indonesia U19	26	(2)
2015–2018	Indonesia U23	15	(0)
2017–2019	Indonesia	9	(0)
Medal record
Men's football
Representing Indonesia
AFF U-19 Youth Championship
Winner	2013 Indonesia
Southeast Asian Games
Bronze medal – third place	2017 Kuala Lumpur	Team
- * Club domestic league appearances and goals as of 5 January 2026

I Putu Gede Juni Antara (born 7 June 1995), simply known as Putu Gede, is an Indonesian professional footballer who plays as a right-back for Super League club Bhayangkara. He is also a Second Police Brigadier in the Indonesian National Police.

== Club career ==
=== Persebaya ISL (Bhayangkara) ===
On 11 November 2014, Putu Gede signed a four-year contract with Persebaya ISL. He made his debut on 5 April 2015 as starting line-up, which ended 1–0 victory against Mitra Kukar at Gelora Bung Tomo Stadium.

=== Persib Bandung ===
Putu Gede was signed for Persib Bandung to play in Liga 1 in the 2023–24 season. He made his debut on 2 July 2023 in a match against Madura United at the Gelora Bandung Lautan Api Stadium, Bandung.

== Personal life ==
Putu Gede Juni Antara is the only son of Balinese parents and is a practicing Hindu. He is considered very sociable and friendly by his teammates with multiple social media accounts.

== International career ==
He made his international debut for senior team on 21 March 2017, against Myanmar.

== Career statistics ==
=== Club ===
As of match played 5 January 2026

Club	Season	League			Cup (Note: Includes Piala Indonesia)		Other (Note: Appearances in Indonesia President's Cup)		Total	
Club	Season	Division	Apps	Goals	Apps	Goals	Apps	Goals	Apps	Goals
Bhayangkara	2015	Indonesia Super League	2	0	0	0	0	0	2	0
Bhayangkara	2016	ISC A	29	1	0	0	0	0	29	1
Bhayangkara	2017	Liga 1	21	1	0	0	0	0	21	1
Bhayangkara	2018	Liga 1	19	0	0	0	2	0	21	0
Bhayangkara	2019	Liga 1	25	0	4	0	4	0	33	0
Bhayangkara	2020	Liga 1	2	0	0	0	0	0	2	0
Bhayangkara	2021–22	Liga 1	25	0	0	0	0	0	25	0
Bhayangkara	2022–23	Liga 1	30	0	0	0	3	0	33	0
Bhayangkara	Total		153	2	4	0	9	0	166	2
Persib Bandung	2023–24	Liga 1	14	0	0	0	0	0	14	0
Bhayangkara	2023–24	Liga 1	13	0	0	0	0	0	13	0
Bhayangkara	2024–25	Liga 2	18	0	0	0	0	0	18	0
Bhayangkara	2025–26	Super League	13	0	0	0	0	0	13	0
Career total			211	2	4	0	9	0	224	2

=== International ===
As of match played 15 October 2019

Appearances and goals by national team and year
National team	Year	Apps	Goals
Indonesia	2017	2	0
Indonesia	2018	6	0
Indonesia	2019	1	0
Total		9	0

== Honours ==
=== Club ===
Bhayangkara

- Liga 1: 2017
- Liga 2 runner-up: 2024–25

=== International ===
Indonesia U-17

- HKFA International Youth Invitation: 2012

Indonesia U-19

- HKFA International Youth Invitation: 2013
- AFF U-19 Youth Championship: 2013

Indonesia U-23

- SEA Games bronze medal: 2017

Indonesia

- Aceh World Solidarity Cup runner-up: 2017
