= Wahyu Subo Seto =

Indonesian footballer (born 1993)

Personal information
- Full name: Wahyu Subo Seto
- Date of birth: 16 July 1993 (age 33)
- Place of birth: Surabaya, Indonesia
- Height: 1.68 m (5 ft 6 in)
- Position: Midfielder

Team information
- Current team: Bhayangkara
- Number: 23

Youth career
- 2010–2011: Persebaya ISL (Bhayangkara)

Senior career*
Years	Team	Apps	(Gls)
2011–	Bhayangkara	250	(5)
- * Club domestic league appearances and goals as of 23:15, 23 May 2026 (UTC)

Wahyu Subo Seto (born 16 July 1993, in Surabaya) is an Indonesian professional footballer who plays as a midfielder for Super League club Bhayangkara.

== Club career ==
=== Bhayangkara FC ===
Wahyu made his debut when Bhayangkara against PS Barito Putera in first week 2016 Indonesia Soccer Championship A. Wahyu scored for the first time when Bhayangkara against Pusamania Borneo, Wahyu scored in the 32nd minutes

== Personal life ==
Wahyu is the younger brother of Fandi Eko Utomo, who currently plays for Bhayangkara. Fandi and Wahyu is the son of the legend of Persebaya Surabaya, Yusuf Ekodono who was an assistant coach of Bhayangkara

== Honours ==
=== Club ===
Bhayangkara

- Liga 1: 2017
- Liga 2 runner-up: 2024–25
