= Indra Kahfi Ardhiyasa =

Indonesian footballer

Indra Kahfi
Personal information
- Full name: Indra Kahfi Ardhiyasa
- Date of birth: 5 October 1986 (age 40)
- Place of birth: Jakarta, Indonesia
- Height: 1.79 m (5 ft 10 in)
- Position: Centre-back

Youth career
- 2004–2008: Police Academy
- 2008–2009: PS POP

Senior career*
Years	Team	Apps	(Gls)
2009–2010	Persita Tangerang	12	(1)
2010–2012	Persikota Tangerang	26	(5)
2012–2013	Deltras Sidoarjo	4	(0)
2014–2015	PSPS Pekanbaru	14	(3)
2016–2025	Bhayangkara	99	(1)
Total		155	(10)

International career^{‡}
2016	Indonesia	1	(0)
- * Club domestic league appearances and goals as of 11 January 2025 ‡ National team caps and goals as of 6 September 2016

Indra Kahfi Ardhiyasa (born 5 October 1986) is an Indonesian former footballer who played as a centre-back for Bhayangkara. His younger brother, Andritany Ardhiyasa is also football player. He is also a Police Inspector 2nd Class in the Indonesian National Police for Mobile Brigade Corps (Brimob) unit.

== International career ==
He made his debut with Indonesia on 6 September 2016 in a friendly against Malaysia as a substitute.

== Honours ==
=== Club ===
Bhayangkara

- Liga 1: 2017
- Liga 2 runner-up: 2024–25
