= 2017 Liga 1 (Indonesia) =

Liga 1
- Season: 2017
- Dates: 15 April – 12 November 2017
- Champions: Bhayangkara; 1st Liga 1 title 1st Indonesian title
- Relegated: Semen Padang; Persiba; Persegres
- AFC Champions League: Bali United
- AFC Cup: Persija
- Matches: 306
- Goals: 882 (2.88 per match)
- Best player: Paulo Sérgio
- Top goalscorer: Sylvano Comvalius (37 goals)
- Biggest home win: Sriwijaya 10–2 Persegres (5 November 2017)
- Biggest away win: Persegres 0–5 Bhayangkara (26 August 2017); Mitra Kukar 0–5 Persipura (13 October 2017)
- Highest scoring: Sriwijaya 10–2 Persegres (5 November 2017)
- Longest winning run: 6 matches Bhayangkara
- Longest unbeaten run: 12 matches Persija; Persipura
- Longest winless run: 17 matches Persegres
- Longest losing run: 10 matches Persegres
- Highest attendance: 36,545; Persib 1–1 Persija (22 July 2017)
- Lowest attendance: 0 Persegres 1–1 Persija (4 July 2017); Borneo 1–0 Persiba (25 September 2017); Madura United 3–1 Barito Putera (5 November 2017); Borneo 2–1 Persib (8 November 2017); Madura United 1–3 Bhayangkara (8 November 2017)
- Total attendance: 2,662,998
- Average attendance: 8,703

The 2017 Liga 1, also known as Go-Jek Traveloka Liga 1 for sponsorship reasons, was the inaugural season of Liga 1 under its current name and the 8th season of the top-flight Indonesian professional league for association football clubs since its establishment in 2008. It was the first official professional league season held post-FIFA sanction. The season started on 15 April 2017 and ended on 12 November 2017. Fixtures for the 2017 season were announced on 11 April 2017.

2014 Indonesia Super League winners Persib were the defending champions, as the 2015 Indonesia Super League was abandoned midway due to FIFA suspension while the 2016 Indonesia Soccer Championship A was not counted as an official league.

Bhayangkara won their first Liga 1 title with one match to spare.

The season was marred by the death of Persela's longtime goalkeeper, Choirul Huda.

== Overview ==
=== Referees ===
In December 2016, PSSI and the league operator planned to use foreign referees for the 2017 competition. The use of foreign referee was intended to improve the quality of the competition. However, two weeks before the league starts, this plan was cancelled.

After a wide criticism, protest and dissatisfaction towards the local referees during the first round of the season, PSSI revisited the idea. On 18 July 2017, PSSI and the league operator officially announced the use of foreign referees and assistant referees in select matches for the second round. There were two sets of officials (consisted of 1 referee and 2 assistant referees), each coming from Australia, Kyrgyzstan, Iran, and Japan.

=== Player regulation ===
League operator also introduced several new regulations, such as requiring clubs to contract a minimum of five U-23 local players with three of them having to play as starting lineup minimum of 45 minutes in a match, restricting clubs to have more than two players older than 35 years old, and increasing the maximum number of substitutions to five for each team in a match.

On 30 July 2017, in preparation for the 2017 Southeast Asian Games, all regulations concerning under-23 players were suspended. Later on 31 August 2017, PSSI decided to extend the suspension of all regulations concerning under-23 players until end of season.

=== Substitution rule ===
FIFA approved the five substitution rule on 12 April 2017. However, the two additional substitutions (in addition of three substitutions, in accordance to FIFA Laws of the Game) were only allowed for U-23 players.

== Teams ==
Eighteen teams competed in the league – all teams from the abandoned 2015 Indonesia Super League. As such, no promoted team competed this season.

=== Name changes ===
- Arema Cronus changed name to Arema before the start of the season.
- Pusamania Borneo changed name to Borneo before the start of the season.

=== Stadiums and locations ===
Locations of the 2017 Liga 1 teams

Team	Location	Stadium	Capacity
Arema	Malang	Kanjuruhan (Note: Arema held several of their home matches at Gajayana.)	44,965
Bali United	Gianyar	Kapten I Wayan Dipta	25,000
Barito Putera	Banjarmasin	May 17th	15,000
Bhayangkara	Bekasi	Patriot Candrabhaga (Note: Bhayangkara —owned by Indonesian National Police— moved their home base to Patriot Candrabhaga and stated their move was intended to make them closer to the National Police Headquarters, located in Jakarta.)	30,000
Borneo	Samarinda	Segiri	16,000
Madura United	Bangkalan	Gelora Ratu Pamelingan (Note: Madura United held several of their home matches at Gelora Bangkalan.)	15,000
Mitra Kukar	Tenggarong	Aji Imbut	35,000
Persegres	Gresik	Petrokimia	20,000
Persela	Lamongan	Surajaya	14,000
Perseru	Serui	Marora	5,000
Persib	Bandung	Si Jalak Harupat (Note: Persib used Gelora Bandung Lautan Api as their home stadium in the first round before they decided to move to Si Jalak Harupat in the second round.)	27,000
Persiba	Balikpapan	Batakan (Note: Persiba was temporarily use Gajayana as their home ground because their actual ground, Parikesit that owned by state-owned oil company Pertamina, was going to be demolished to make way for their oil refinery expansion as their newly-built replacement, Batakan, was still under construction and won't be ready until June. Later, Pertamina allowed Persiba to use Parikesit in June. After a round of negotiation, Persiba extended this permission and continue to use Parikesit until Batakan was ready and pass the verification.)	46,000
Persija	Bekasi	Patriot Candrabhaga (Note: Persija moved their home base to Patriot Candrabhaga because their regular ground, Gelora Bung Karno in Jakarta was renovated for the upcoming 2018 Asian Games and was unavailable for the rest of the season.)	30,000
Persipura	Jayapura	Mandala	30,000
PS TNI	Cibinong	Pakansari	30,000
PSM	Makassar	Andi Mattalata	15,000
Semen Padang	Padang	Haji Agus Salim	15,000
Sriwijaya	Palembang	Gelora Sriwijaya (Note: Sriwijaya moved their home base to Bumi Sriwijaya starting from week 26 because Gelora Sriwijaya was renovated for the upcoming 2018 Asian Games and was unavailable for the rest of the season.)	36,000

=== Personnel and kits ===
Note: Flags indicate national team as has been defined under FIFA eligibility rules. Players and coaches may hold more than one non-FIFA nationality.

Team	Head coach	Captain	Kit manufacturer	Shirt sponsor(s)
Arema	(Indonesia) Joko Susilo	(Indonesia) Johan Alfarizi	Specs	Torabika, Corsa, Guna Bangun Perkasa, Ijen Suites, Arema Access, Go-Jek
Bali United	(Indonesia) Widodo C. Putro	(Indonesia) Fadil Sausu	Made by club	Indofood, Bank Ina, Anker Sport, Torabika, Achilles, Corsa, Mobil, ACA, Go-Jek, YCAB Foundation, Indomie, Bareksa, DM ID
Barito Putera	(Brazil) Jacksen F. Tiago	(Indonesia) Rizky Pora	Vision of Superior	Hasnur Group, Go-Jek, PT. Buana Karya Wiratama, Bank Kalsel
Bhayangkara	(Scotland) Simon McMenemy	(Indonesia) Indra Kahfi	Vilour	BNI
Borneo	(Indonesia) Iwan Setiawan	(Japan) Kunihiro Yamashita	Salvo	STM, BIB, CV Citra, Kopi ABC, Apau, Go-Jek
Madura United	(Brazil) Gomes de Olivera	(Brazil) Fabiano Beltrame	Mizuno	JD.id, Lion Air, POJUR, Integra Group, Torabika, POOL Advista, Go-Jek, Radar Madura
Mitra Kukar	(Indonesia) Yudi Suryata	(Indonesia) Bayu Pradana	Joma	ABP Energy, PT Putra Perkasa Abadi, Go-Jek, Grand Elty, Bank Kaltim
Persegres	(Indonesia) Hanafi	(Indonesia) Agus Indra	Creative Color	
Persela	(Indonesia) Aji Santoso	(Portugal) José Coelho	Lotto	Go-Jek, So Nice, APP
Perseru	(Indonesia) Agus Yuwono	(Indonesia) Arthur Bonai	Junior Sport	Bank Papua, Pemerintah Kabupaten Kep. Yapen
Persib	(Indonesia) Emral Abus	(Indonesia) Atep Rizal	Sportama	Datsun, Indofood, Indomie, Permata Bank Syariah, Go-Jek, Go-Pay, Corsa, Indaco, IM3 Ooredoo, Kopi ABC, FWD
Persiba	(Indonesia) Haryadi	(Brazil) Marlon da Silva	MBB	Anugerah Group, Go-Jek
Persija	(Brazil) Stefano Cugurra	(Indonesia) Ismed Sofyan	League	Go-Jek, TOA, Columbia, Dompetku
Persipura	(Brazil) Wanderley da Silva	(Indonesia) Boaz Solossa	Specs	Bank Papua, Persipura Access
PS TNI	(Indonesia) Rudy Priyambada	(Indonesia) Manahati Lestusen	MBB	Mogu Mogu, Torabika, GOON, Go-Jek
PSM	(Netherlands) Robert Alberts	(Indonesia) Hamka Hamzah	Kelme	Semen Bosowa, Kopi ABC
Semen Padang	(Indonesia) Syafrianto Rusli	(Indonesia) Hengky Ardiles	Mizuno	Semen Padang, Torabika, Bank Nagari, Oxygen Denim, Go-Jek, PT. Kunango Jantan, Covesia, G-Sport, Ayia
Sriwijaya	(Indonesia) Hartono Ruslan	(South Korea) Yoo Hyun-goo	Calci	Bank Sumsel Babel, TEL, Torabika, Berita Pagi, Sriwijaya Post, PGN, PDPDE, Bukit Asam, Go-Jek

Additionally, referee kits are made by Joma and Nike supplied the match ball.

=== Coaching changes ===
- Indicate the positions in the relegation zone.

Team	Outgoing coach	Manner of departure	Date of vacancy	Week	Table	Incoming coach	Date of appointment
Barito Putera	(Indonesia) Yunan Helmi	End of caretaker role	18 December 2016	Pre-season		(Brazil) Jacksen F. Tiago	2 December 2016
Bhayangkara	(Indonesia) Ibnu Grahan	End of contract	20 December 2016	Pre-season		(Scotland) Simon McMenemy	23 December 2016
Arema	(Bosnia and Herzegovina) Milomir Šešlija	Mutual consent	20 December 2016	Pre-season		(Indonesia) Aji Santoso	24 December 2016
Persija	(Indonesia) Zein Alhadad	End of contract	22 December 2016	Pre-season		(Brazil) Stefano Cugurra	30 December 2016
Persiba	(Brazil) Jaino Matos	End of contract	23 December 2016	Pre-season		(Germany) Timo Scheunemann	11 January 2017
Persela	(Indonesia) Aji Santoso	Signed by Arema	24 December 2016	Pre-season		(Indonesia) Herry Kiswanto	23 Januari 2017
Persegres	(Indonesia) Eduard Tjong	End of contract	31 December 2016	Pre-season		(Indonesia) Hanafi	10 January 2017
Perseru	(Indonesia) Hanafi	Signed by Persegres	10 January 2017	Pre-season		(Indonesia) Yusak Sutanto	18 January 2017
PS TNI	(Indonesia) Suharto AD	End of caretaker role	15 January 2017	Pre-season		(Indonesia) Mustaqim	15 January 2017
Bali United	(Indonesia) Indra Sjafri	Signed by Indonesia U19s	19 January 2017	Pre-season		(Austria) Hans-Peter Schaller	5 February 2017
PS TNI	(Indonesia) Mustaqim	Sacked	17 February 2017	Pre-season		(France) Laurent Hatton	15 March 2017
Sriwijaya	(Indonesia) Widodo C. Putro	End of contract	25 March 2017	Pre-season		(Brazil) Osvaldo Lessa	26 March 2017
Persipura	(Argentina) Alfredo Vera	Mutual consent	17 April 2017	Pre-season		(Indonesia) Liestiadi	17 April 2017
Bali United	(Austria) Hans-Peter Schaller	Sacked	26 April 2017	2	17	(Indonesia) Eko Purjianto	26 April 2017
PS TNI	(France) Laurent Hatton	Mutual consent	1 May 2017	3	5	(Bulgaria) Ivan Kolev	1 May 2017
Persiba	(Germany) Timo Scheunemann	Resigned	1 May 2017	3	18	(Bosnia and Herzegovina) Milomir Šešlija	4 May 2017
Bali United	(Indonesia) Eko Purjianto	End of caretaker role	10 May 2017	5	14	(Indonesia) Widodo C. Putro	10 May 2017
Perseru	(Indonesia) Yusak Sutanto	Sacked	7 June 2017	10	16	(Indonesia) Agus Yuwono	7 June 2017
Persipura	(Indonesia) Liestiadi	Resigned	8 June 2017	10	5	(Indonesia) Mettu Duaramury	8 June 2017
Sriwijaya	(Brazil) Osvaldo Lessa	Sacked	17 June 2017	11	12	(Indonesia) Hartono Ruslan	18 August 2017
Persipura	(Indonesia) Mettu Duaramury	End of caretaker role	20 June 2017	11	4	(Brazil) Wanderley da Silva	20 June 2017
Borneo	(Montenegro) Dragan Đukanović	Sacked	13 July 2017	14	11	(Indonesia) Ricky Nelson	13 July 2017
Persib	(Indonesia) Djadjang Nurdjaman	Resigned	16 July 2017	15	12	(Indonesia) Herrie Setiawan	16 July 2017
Arema	(Indonesia) Aji Santoso	Resigned	31 July 2017	17	7	(Indonesia) Joko Susilo	31 July 2017
Mitra Kukar	(Indonesia) Jafri Sastra	Resigned	31 July 2017	17	8	(Indonesia) Sukardi Kardok	31 July 2017
Persiba	(Bosnia and Herzegovina) Milomir Šešlija	Resigned	9 August 2017	18	18	(Indonesia) Haryadi	10 August 2017
Borneo	(Indonesia) Ricky Nelson	End of caretaker role	14 August 2017	19	8	(Indonesia) Iwan Setiawan	14 August 2017
Persib	(Indonesia) Herrie Setiawan	End of caretaker role	2 September 2017	22	9	(Indonesia) Emral Abus	2 September 2017
Persela	(Indonesia) Herry Kiswanto	Resigned	4 September 2017	22	15	(Indonesia) Aji Santoso	7 September 2017
Mitra Kukar	(Indonesia) Sukardi Kardok	End of caretaker role	4 September 2017	22	8	(Indonesia) Yudi Suryata	7 September 2017
PS TNI	(Bulgaria) Ivan Kolev	Sacked	21 September 2017	25	15	(Indonesia) Rudy Priyambada	21 September 2017
Semen Padang	(Indonesia) Nil Maizar	Sacked	4 October 2017	27	15	(Indonesia) Delfi Adri	4 October 2017
Semen Padang	(Indonesia) Delfi Adri	End of caretaker role	19 October 2017	30	15	(Indonesia) Syafrianto Rusli	19 October 2017

== Foreign players ==
Football Association of Indonesia or PSSI restricted the number of foreign players strictly to four per team, including one slot for a player from AFC countries, and one slot for a marquee player, a player that was required to have played in a top European league (Premier League, La Liga, Serie A, Bundesliga, Ligue 1, Primeira Liga, Eredivisie, Süper Lig, etc.) in the last 8 years, or a player that have played in the last three editions of the FIFA World Cup. Teams can use all the foreign players at once.

- Players name in **bold** indicates the player was registered during the mid-season transfer window.
- Former Player(s) were players that out of squad or left club within the season, after pre-season transfer window, or in the mid-season transfer window, and at least had one appearance.

Team	Player 1	Player 2	Asian Player	Marquee Player	Former Player(s)
Arema	(Argentina) Esteban Vizcarra	(Brazil) Arthur Cunha	(Turkmenistan) **Ahmet Ataýew**	(Colombia) Juan Pablo Pino	(Lebanon) Jad Noureddine
Bali United	(Argentina) Marcos Flores	(Netherlands) Sylvano Comvalius	(South Korea) Ahn Byung-keon	(Netherlands) Nick van der Velden	
Barito Putera	(Argentina) Matías Córdoba	(Brazil) **Willian Lira**	(Australia) Aaron Evans	(Brazil) Douglas Packer	(Brazil) Thiago Cunha
Bhayangkara	(Brazil) Otávio Dutra	(Montenegro) **Ilija Spasojević** (Note: Ilija Spasojević gained Indonesian citizenship on 25 October 2017, but he was registered as a foreign player in the second transfer window.)	(South Korea) Lee Yoo-joon	(Portugal) Paulo Sérgio	(Brazil) Thiago Furtuoso
Borneo	(Brazil) Flávio Beck	(Brazil) Matheus Lopes	(Japan) Kunihiro Yamashita	(New Zealand) Shane Smeltz	(Brazil) Helder Lobato
Madura United	(Brazil) Fabiano Beltrame	(Brazil) **Thiago Furtuoso**	(Australia) Dane Milovanović	(Nigeria) Peter Odemwingie	(Australia) Cameron Watson (Ivory Coast) Boubacar Sanogo (Morocco) Redouane Zerzouri
Mitra Kukar	(Spain) Jorge Gotor	(Brazil) Marclei Santos	(South Korea) Oh In-kyun	(Mali) Mohamed Sissoko	
Persegres	(Brazil) Patrick da Silva	(Serbia) **Saša Zečević**	(Japan) **Yusuke Kato**		(South Korea) Choi Hyun-yeon (North Macedonia) Goran Gančev
Persela	(Brazil) Ivan Carlos	(Brazil) **Ramon Rodrigues**	(Japan) Kosuke Uchida	(Portugal) José Coelho	(Brazil) Márcio Rosário
Perseru	(Ivory Coast) Boman Aimé	(Paraguay) Sílvio Escobar	(Japan) **Ryutaro Karube**		(Lebanon) Omar El-Din
Persib	(Montenegro) Vladimir Vujović	(Chad) **Ezechiel N'Douassel**	(Japan) Shohei Matsunaga	(Ghana) Michael Essien	(England) Carlton Cole
Persiba	(Brazil) Marlon da Silva	(Montenegro) **Srđan Lopičić**	(Iraq) Anmar Almubaraki	(Brazil) **Júnior Lopes**	(Japan) Masahito Noto (Liberia) Dirkir Glay
Persija	(Brazil) Willian Pacheco	(Australia) **Reinaldo**	(Nepal) Rohit Chand	(Brazil) Bruno Lopes	(Brazil) Luiz Júnior
Persipura	(Brazil) **Mauricio Leal**	(Brazil) Addison Alves	(South Korea) Yoo Jae-hoon		(Brazil) Ricardinho
PS TNI	(Morocco) **Redouane Zerzouri**	(Central African Republic) **Franklin Anzité**	(South Korea) Hong Soon-hak	(Portugal) Élio Martins	(Argentina) Facundo Talín (Argentina) Leonel Núñez (Guinea) Aboubacar Camara (Guinea) Aboubacar Sylla
PSM	(France) Steven Paulle	(Netherlands) Marc Klok	(Uzbekistan) **Pavel Purishkin**	(Netherlands) Wiljan Pluim	(Australia) Reinaldo
Semen Padang	(Brazil) Cássio de Jesus	(Brazil) Marcel Sacramento	(South Korea) Ko Jae-sung		(Ivory Coast) Didier Zokora
Sriwijaya	(Brazil) Alberto Gonçalves	(Brazil) Hilton Moreira	(South Korea) Yoo Hyun-goo	(Tunisia) Tijani Belaïd	

Source: First transfer window, Second transfer window

== League table ==
Pos	Team	Pld	W	D	L	GF	GA	GD	Pts	Qualification or relegation
1	Bhayangkara (C)	34	22	2	10	61	40	+21	68 (Note: Head-to-head results: Bali United 1–3 Bhayangkara; Bhayangkara 3–2 Bali United.)	
2	Bali United	34	21	5	8	76	38	+38	68	Qualification for the AFC Champions League preliminary round 1 (Note: Bhayangkara failed to obtain an AFC license to participate in Asian competitions. As a result, Bali United, the league runners-up, entered the qualifying play-offs.)
3	PSM	34	19	8	7	67	38	+29	65	
4	Persija	34	17	10	7	48	24	+24	61	Qualification for the AFC Cup group stage (Note: PSM failed to obtain an AFC license to participate in Asian competitions. As a result, Persija, the league 4th place, entered the group stage.)
5	Persipura	34	17	9	8	64	37	+27	60	
6	Madura United (Note: Madura United were deducted three points due to FIFA sanction. Madura United would have qualified for the AFC Cup group stage had Bali United qualified for the AFC Champions League group stage. As Bali United failed to qualify for the AFC Champions League group stage, Madura United's qualification in the AFC Cup was annulled.)	34	17	9	8	58	44	+14	57	
7	Barito Putera	34	15	8	11	48	44	+4	53	
8	Borneo	34	15	7	12	50	39	+11	52	
9	Arema	34	13	10	11	43	44	−1	49	
10	Mitra Kukar	34	13	4	17	49	74	−25	43	
11	Sriwijaya	34	11	9	14	50	50	0	42 (Note: Head-to-head results: Sriwijaya 2–1 PS TNI; PS TNI 2–1 Sriwijaya.)	
12	PS TNI	34	12	6	16	46	58	−12	42	
13	Persib	34	9	14	11	39	36	+3	41	
14	Persela	34	12	4	18	49	55	−6	40	
15	Perseru	34	10	7	17	35	45	−10	37	
16	Semen Padang (R)	34	9	8	17	34	51	−17	35	Relegation to Liga 2
17	Persiba (R)	34	7	6	21	41	62	−21	27	Relegation to Liga 2
18	Persegres (Note: Persegres were deducted three points due to FIFA sanction.) (R)	34	2	4	28	26	104	−78	7	Relegation to Liga 2

Source: Go-Jek Traveloka Liga 1, Soccerway
Rules for classification: 1) Points; 2) Head-to-head; 3) Goal Difference; 4) Goals Scored; 5) Drawing.
(C) Champions; (R) Relegated

=== Position by Round ===
Team ╲ Round	1	2	3	4	5	6	7	8	9	10	11	12	13	14	15	16	17	18	19	20	21	22	23	24	25	26	27	28	29	30	31	32	33	34
Arema	11	4	4	2	3	4	8	4	8	10	7	8	5	2	6	7	7	8	10	9	8	7	8	7	7	7	7	9	9	9	9	9	9	9
Perseru	14	8	13	16	16	16	16	16	17	16	16	16	16	16	16	16	16	16	16	16	16	16	16	16	16	16	16	16	16	16	15	16	15	15
Bali United	18	18	15	10	14	9	12	6	2	6	12	10	6	3	5	3	1	4	2	2	1	1	2	2	2	2	3	2	3	3	3	3	2	2
Barito	3	5	1	4	9	12	10	14	10	15	10	6	4	7	9	8	12	7	9	10	11	11	7	9	9	9	8	8	7	7	8	7	7	7
Bhayangkara	4	10	14	9	5	8	6	9	7	3	3	4	8	5	3	1	4	3	5	3	3	2	1	1	1	1	1	1	1	1	1	1	1	1
Borneo FC	6	14	7	12	8	13	13	10	13	12	13	12	13	11	12	10	11	13	8	8	10	10	11	8	8	8	9	7	8	8	7	8	8	8
Persegres	8	16	17	18	18	17	17	17	16	17	17	17	17	17	17	17	18	18	18	18	18	18	18	18	18	18	18	18	18	18	18	18	18	18
Madura	5	11	10	6	7	10	7	7	3	2	2	2	2	4	2	4	2	1	3	5	5	6	6	5	5	4	4	4	4	5	5	5	4	5
Mitra Kukar	15	15	16	11	6	7	4	8	5	9	6	11	7	9	8	9	9	11	7	7	6	8	9	10	11	11	10	10	10	10	10	10	10	10
Persela	16	9	12	15	13	14	9	13	9	4	9	14	10	10	11	13	10	12	15	15	15	15	14	14	12	13	12	13	13	13	11	12	14	14
Persib	12	13	5	3	2	2	2	5	11	5	11	7	11	12	13	14	15	15	13	11	9	9	10	11	10	10	11	11	11	11	12	11	12	13
Persiba	17	17	18	17	17	18	18	18	18	18	18	18	18	18	18	18	17	17	17	17	17	17	17	17	17	17	17	17	17	17	17	17	17	17
Persija	2	3	8	13	15	15	15	15	12	8	5	5	9	8	7	6	5	6	6	6	7	5	5	6	6	6	6	6	6	6	6	6	6	4
PS TNI	7	12	6	8	4	3	5	3	6	11	8	9	12	13	10	11	8	10	14	14	14	14	15	15	15	14	14	14	14	14	14	13	11	12
Persipura	13	7	11	7	12	6	3	2	4	7	4	3	3	6	4	2	3	2	1	1	2	3	4	4	4	5	5	5	5	4	4	4	5	6
PSM	1	1	2	1	1	1	1	1	1	1	1	1	1	1	1	5	6	5	4	4	4	4	3	3	3	3	2	3	2	2	2	2	3	3
Semen	9	2	3	5	10	11	14	12	15	14	15	13	14	15	15	12	13	9	11	12	12	13	13	13	14	15	15	15	15	15	16	15	16	16
Sriwijaya FC	10	6	9	14	11	5	11	11	14	13	14	15	15	14	14	15	14	14	12	13	13	12	12	12	13	12	13	12	12	12	13	14	13	11

Champions of 2017 Liga 1
Relegation to Liga 2

First match(es) will be played on 14 April 2017. Source:

== Results ==
Home \ Away	ARE	BLU	BPT	BHA	BOR	MDU	MKU	PGU	PSL	PSR	PSB	PBA	PSJ	PPR	TNI	PSM	SPD	SRI
Arema	—	2–0	1–0	2–0	0–0	1–1	2–0	2–0	2–0	0–0	0–0	3–0	1–1	0–2	1–1	3–3	5–3	3–2
Bali United	6–1	—	5–0	1–3	3–0	5–2	6–1	3–0	5–1	2–0	1–0	2–0	2–1	1–2	2–1	3–0	2–0	3–2
Barito Putera	1–2	1–1	—	1–0	2–1	2–2	2–1	2–0	4–1	2–0	1–0	1–0	1–0	1–1	0–1	2–2	3–1	2–0
Bhayangkara	2–1	3–2	0–1	—	2–1	2–1	4–1	2–1	3–1	2–1	2–0	3–2	1–2	2–1	1–2	0–2	1–0	2–1
Borneo	3–2	0–0	2–1	3–0	—	3–0	1–0	3–0	4–2	2–0	2–1 (Note: Borneo hosted Persib at Mulawarman due to sanctions by PSSI Disciplinary Committee after a referee was intimidated following a match against Bali United.)	1–0 (Note: Borneo hosted Persiba at Mulawarman due to sanctions by PSSI Disciplinary Committee after a referee was intimidated following a match against Bali United.)	1–2	1–1	1–0	3–2	1–0	0–1
Madura United	2–0	2–0	3–1	1–3	1–1	—	2–2	3–2	2–1	1–1	3–1	1–0	1–1	2–0	4–1	1–0	6–0	3–0
Mitra Kukar	0–3	2–1	3–2	0–3 (Note: PSSI Disciplinary Committee declared Mitra Kukar lost 3–0 to Bhayangkara because they played a player being suspended under a Disciplinary Committee punishment. The original score was 1–1.)	0–4	2–1	—	3–1	3–2	1–0	2–1	2–2	1–2	0–5	5–3	1–1	1–0	2–0
Persegres	2–3	1–3 (Note: Persegres hosted Bali United at Surajaya because GOR Tri Dharma's complex was used for 2017 Asian Men's Volleyball Championship.)	2–1	0–5	0–1	0–3	2–4	—	0–2	2–5	0–1	2–1	1–1	0–4	0–3 (Note: Persegres hosted PS TNI at Surajaya due to the election of village heads in the local area.)	1–1	1–3	1–1 (Note: Persegres hosted Sriwijaya at Surajaya because GOR Tri Dharma's complex was used for 2017 Asian Men's Volleyball Championship.)
Persela	4–0	0–1	3–2	1–3	3–1	2–0	2–3	7–1	—	1–0	1–0	2–2	1–0	0–1	1–0	0–1	2–0 (Note: Choirul Huda died during the match after colliding with a teammate while attempting to collect a ball.)	2–1
Perseru	2–0	1–3 (Note: Perseru hosted Bali United at Kapten I Wayan Dipta because Marora was not approved by PSSI to hold nighttime matches.)	0–1	1–1	3–2	2–0	2–1	1–0	0–0	—	2–1	2–1	0–3 (Note: Perseru hosted Persija at Patriot Candrabaga because Marora was not approved by PSSI to hold nighttime matches.)	2–1	0–1 (Note: Perseru hosted PS TNI at Pakansari because Marora was not approved by PSSI to hold nighttime matches.)	1–2	0–0	2–3
Persib	0–0	0–0	0–0	1–1	2–2	0–0	3–1	6–0	1–1	0–2	—	1–0	1–1	1–0	3–1	2–1	2–2	2–0
Persiba	0–1	3–2	2–3	1–2	3–2	3–4	3–2	3–0	2–2	2–1	2–2	—	0–2	0–2	1–0	2–2	1–0	0–2
Persija	2–0	0–0	1–1	1–0	1–0	0–1	1–1	5–0	2–0	1–0	3–0 (Note: Persija hosted Persib at Manahan after Bekasi city police refused them to hold a home game at Patriot Candrabhaga. The match between Persija and Persib stopped in 83' due to dissatisfaction with the referee when Persija was leading 1–0; Persija declared won 3–0.)	2–0	—	1–1	4–1	2–2	2–0	1–0 (Note: Persija hosted Sriwijaya at Wibawa Mukti and without spectators due to fan riots that occurred at the Patriot Candrabhaga.)
Persipura	3–1	3–1	3–1	3–2	2–1	0–1	6–0	1–1	2–1	2–2	0–0	4–2	3–0	—	2–1	0–0	3–0	2–2
PS TNI	0–0	3–4	1–1	0–1	2–2	2–3	2–1	2–1	3–2	2–1	2–2	1–1	0–2	2–1 (Note: PS TNI hosted Persipura at Patriot Candrabaga because Pakansari was being renovated for the 2018 Asian Games.)	—	2–1	2–1	2–1
PSM	1–0	0–1	1–1	2–1	1–0	6–1	1–0	5–1	3–1	2–0	2–1	3–1	1–0	5–1	4–1	—	4–0	1–0
Semen Padang	2–0	1–3	1–2	1–2	1–1	0–0	1–2	4–1	1–0	3–1	0–0	2–1	1–1	1–0	2–0	2–1	—	1–1
Sriwijaya	1–1	2–2	3–2	1–2	1–0	0–0	3–1	10–2	2–0	0–0	1–4	1–0	1–0	2–2	2–1	3–4	0–0	—

Source: Go-Jek Traveloka Liga 1, Soccerway
Legend: Blue = home team win; Yellow = draw; Red = away team win.
For upcoming matches, an "a" indicates there is an article about the rivalry between the two participants.

== Season statistics ==
=== Top goalscorers ===
Rank	Player	Club	Goals
1	(Netherlands) Sylvano Comvalius	Bali United	37
2	(Brazil) Marclei Santos	Mitra Kukar	24
3	(Brazil) Alberto Gonçalves	Sriwijaya	22
4	(Indonesia) Samsul Arif	Persela	17
5	(Indonesia) Lerby Eliandry	Borneo	16
6	(Nigeria) Peter Odemwingie	Madura United	15
6	(Brazil) Addison Alves	Persipura	15
8	(Indonesia) Greg Nwokolo	Madura United	14
9	(Montenegro) Ilija Spasojević	Bhayangkara	13

=== Hat-tricks ===
Player	For	Against	Result	Date
(Nigeria) Peter Odemwingie	Madura United	Semen Padang	6–0 (H)	12 June 2017
(Indonesia) Prisca Womsiwor	Persipura	Mitra Kukar	6–0 (H)	3 July 2017
(Brazil) Addison Alves	Persipura	Bali United	3–1 (H)	9 August 2017
(Netherlands) Sylvano Comvalius	Bali United	Madura United	5–2 (H)	13 August 2017
(Indonesia) Raphael Maitimo	Persib	Persegres	6–0 (H)	20 August 2017
(Netherlands) Sylvano Comvalius^{5}	Bali United	Mitra Kukar	6–1 (H)	27 August 2017
(Indonesia) Samsul Arif	Persela	Persegres	7–1 (H)	30 September 2017
(Indonesia) Boaz Solossa	Persipura	Persija	3–0 (H)	18 October 2017
(Portugal) Élio Martins	PS TNI	Persegres	3–0 (A)	28 October 2017
(Brazil) Alberto Gonçalves	Sriwijaya	Persegres	10–2 (H)	5 November 2017
(Indonesia) Slamet Budiyono	Sriwijaya	Persegres	10–2 (H)	5 November 2017
(Montenegro) Ilija Spasojević	Bhayangkara	Madura United	3–1 (A)	8 November 2017
(Indonesia) Muhammad Rachmat	PSM	Madura United	6–1 (H)	12 November 2017

Note: ^{5} Player scored 5 goals

=== Discipline ===
- Most yellow card(s): 12
  - (Spain) Jorge Gotor (Mitra Kukar)
- Most red card(s): 3
  - (Indonesia) Sandi Sute (Persija)

== Attendances ==
Pos	Team	Total	High	Low	Average	Change
1	Persija	391,913	29,699	1,200	23,054	−8.1%
2	Persib	306,107	36,545	3,160	18,006	−6.9%
3	PSM	234,242	14,925	9,357	13,779	+2,580.7%
4	Bali United	228,197	23,220	6,042	13,423	+128.4%
5	Persipura	210,665	17,981	4,560	12,392	+99.0%
6	Persela	174,379	14,000	3,947	10,258	+7.2%
7	Arema	170,816	27,610	1,611	10,048	−46.8%
8	Sriwijaya	143,596	17,247	1,725	8,447	−13.5%
9	Persiba	129,372	20,000	497	7,610	+90.2%
10	Borneo	116,432	12,371	0	6,849	+121.7%^{†}
11	Semen Padang	99,721	11,872	1,272	5,866	−29.7%
12	Barito Putera	98,062	9,124	2,252	5,768	−7.2%
13	Madura United	87,533	13,997	0	5,149	+173.9%
14	Bhayangkara	84,705	29,397	1,250	4,983	+26.5%
15	Persegres	59,030	15,189	0	3,472	−43.7%
16	Perseru	51,051	12,954	237	3,003	+109.4%
17	PS TNI	38,595	18,288	257	2,270	+473.2%
18	Mitra Kukar	38,582	4,234	521	2,270	+1.2%
	League total	2,662,998	36,545	0	8,703	+11.3%

Source: Go-Jek Traveloka Liga 1
Notes:
^{†} Teams played previous season in Premier Division
* Comparison for previous season average attendance was based on 2014 Indonesia Super League, because 2015 Indonesia Super League was abandoned and 2016 Indonesia Soccer Championship A was not counted as an official league.

== Awards ==
=== Annual ===
These were the list of Liga Indonesia First & Excellence (LIFE) Awards 2017 winners that held on 22 December 2017.

Award	Winner
Best Player	(Portugal) Paulo Sérgio (Bhayangkara)
Best Young Player	(Indonesia) Rezaldi Hehanusa (Persija)
Fair Play Team	Perseru
Best Referee	(Indonesia) Musthofa Umarella
Best Goal	(Indonesia) Septian David (Mitra Kukar)
Lifetime Achievement	(Indonesia) Choirul Huda (Persela)

=== Team of the season ===
Best XI
Goalkeeper	(Indonesia) Andritany Ardhiyasa (Persija)			
Defenders	(Indonesia) Gavin Kwan (Barito Putera)	(Brazil) Willian Pacheco (Persija)	(Indonesia) Hamka Hamzah (PSM)	(Indonesia) Rezaldi Hehanusa (Persija)
Midfielders	(Indonesia) Bayu Pradana (Mitra Kukar)		(Portugal) Paulo Sérgio (Bhayangkara)	(Netherlands) Wiljan Pluim (PSM)
Forwards	(Indonesia) Irfan Bachdim (Bali United)		(Netherlands) Sylvano Comvalius (Bali United)	(Indonesia) Septian David (Mitra Kukar)

== See also ==
- 2017 Liga 2
- 2017 Liga 3
