= Bhayangkara Presisi Lampung F.C. =

Indonesian football club

Bhayangkara Presisi Lampung
- Full name: Bhayangkara Presisi Lampung Football Club
- Nickname: The Guardians of Saburai
- Short name: BHA; BFC; BPI; BPL
- Founded: 2010; 16 years ago, as Persebaya (DU); 2016; 10 years ago, as Bhayangkara FC; 2023; 3 years ago, as Bhayangkara Presisi Indonesia FC; 2025; 1 year ago, as Bhayangkara Presisi Lampung FC
- Ground: Sumpah Pemuda Stadium
- Capacity: 7,159
- Owner: Indonesian National Police
- CEO: Agus Suryonugroho
- Head coach: Óscar Bruzón
- League: Super League
- 2025–26: Super League, 5th of 18
- Website: bhayangkarafc.id
Home colours	Away colours

Bhayangkara Presisi Lampung Football Club, simply known as Bhayangkara Presisi, is an Indonesian professional football club based in Bandar Lampung, Lampung. The club is linked to the Indonesian National Police. The club plays in Super League from the 2025–26 season following promotion in 2024–25 Liga 2.

The name of the club is based on a police rank. They have won the Super League title in 2017.

== History ==
=== Persebaya offspring (2010–2016) ===
Bhayangkara FC was a by-product of internal conflict in one of Indonesia's oldest clubs, Persebaya Surabaya. As the conflict was peaking in 2010, a rebel faction acquired Persikubar West Kutai, a second-tier club based in West Kutai on East Kalimantan, following the decision of the main faction to pull Persebaya out of the Indonesian Super League (ISL) and register it for the inaugural season of the Indonesian Premier League (IPL). The rebel faction renamed Persikubar into Persebaya and moved its base to Surabaya, so that the latter could still have a representation in the 2011 season of ISL, albeit in its second-tier.

When the Persebaya DU team managed to win promotion into the top-tier of ISL in 2013, the naming issue became a legal battle as another Persebaya was playing in the top-tier of IPL. In a span of a year (August 2015 to September 2016), this team changed names four times in order to circumvent legal challenges from different parties, including the notorious Persebaya supporters known as Bonek. In April 2016, the team known at that time as Surabaya United, merged with PS Polri, the amateur club of the Indonesian National Police, to obtain legal backing and create Bhayangkara Surabaya United.

=== A police team (2016–present) ===
On 10 September 2016, the Indonesian National Police became the main operator of the club and renamed it into its current identification, Bhayangkara FC. Bhayangkara itself is a nickname for the Indonesian police, deriving from the name of the guardians of the ancient kingdom of Majapahit. In November 2020, the club moved its base to Surakarta after failing to win support from football fans in the national capital, already loyal to one of the most popular club in the country, Persija Jakarta. They then planned to change its name to Bhayangkara Solo. However, the renaming plan was canceled.

=== First national trophy ===
In 2017, Bhayangkara FC won the 2017 Liga 1 championship on a head-to-head decision, which was seen as controversial by football fans nationwide who preferred the runner-up Bali United, which had collected the same number of points. While the procedure was legal, fans considered Bhayangkara as an elitist creation, with no popular support, while Bali United had won the hearts of the people in Bali. Despite the championship, Bhayangkara FC was unable to compete in the 2018 AFC Champions League, and the AFC Champions League spot went to Bali United.

2017 Liga 1 Bhayangkara FC Squad Champions

=== Decline and relegation ===
After winning the 2017 season, Bhayangkara had managed to finish mostly in the top five of the league table for three consecutive seasons. However, in the 2022–23 season, they only managed to finish seventh.

During the 2023–24 season, the team suffered a winless run which lasted for 16 matches, forcing them to make extensive player transfers, including the recruit of former Belgium national football team player, Radja Nainggolan. The team was relegated in game week 32 after a 1–2 loss against Bali United, while relegation contender Persita Tangerang drew 1–1 against Persik Kediri.

=== Return to Liga 1 ===
In the 2024–25 Liga 2 regular series, Bhayangkara topped the Group 2 standings, advancing them to the promotion round. Bhayangkara then secured the Group Y top position, qualification to the Liga 2 final, and a promotion ticket back to Liga 1 after a goalless draw against Persijap in 12 February.

Following their promotion back to Liga 1. Bhayangkara reappointed Paul Munster as their head coach for the 2025–26 season.

== Colours and badges ==
Bhayangkara FC's main colour is gold, which is associated with the golden badge of police officers. The golden badge is also clearly included at the top section of its logo.

== Kit history ==
Year(s)	Manufacturer(s)
2010–2011	Nike
2011–2012	Vilour
2012–2013	Warrior
2014	Specs
2015	Mitre
2016	Vision Superior (SU)
2017	Vilour
2018	Umbro
2019	Lotto
2020	Specs
2021–2025	Mills
2025–	Etams

== Honours ==
Domestic
League/Division	Titles	Runners-up	Seasons won	Seasons runners-up
Liga 1	1	0	2017	
Liga Indonesia Premier Division	1	0	2013(second-tier era)	
Liga 2	0	1		2024–25
Domestic
Cup Competitions	Titles	Runners-up	Seasons won	Seasons runners-up
Piala Gubernur Jatim	0	1		2013
Trofeo Kapolda Jatim	1	0	2016	
International
Friendly Tournament	Titles	Runners-up	Seasons won	Seasons runners-up
Siem Reap Cup	1	0	2020	

== Seasons ==
Note: Since this team established as Bhayangkara FC.

=== Recent history ===
Champions	Runners-up	Third place	Promoted	Relegated

Season	Division	Pos.	Pld.	W	D	L	GF	GA	Pts.	Cup	ACLE	ACL 2	ACGL	ACC
2017	L1	1st	34	22	2	10	61	40	68	–	– (Note: Bhayangkara FC failed to qualify for the AFC CL qualifying round due to licensing issues.)	–	–	–
2018	L1	3rd	34	15	8	11	41	39	53	Quarter Final	–	–	–	–
2019	L1	4th	34	14	11	9	51	43	53	–	–	–	–	–
2020	L1	season declared void									–	–	–	–
2021–22	L1	3rd	34	19	9	6	48	27	66	–	–	–	–	–
2022–23	L1	7th	34	15	6	13	53	44	51	–	–	–	–	–
2023–24	L1	17th	34	5	11	18	42	56	26	–	–	–	–	–
2024–25	L2	2nd	23	11	9	3	35	12	42	–	–	–	–	–
2025–26	SL	5th	34	16	5	13	53	45	53	–	–	–	–	–
2026–27	SL	TBD	34	0	0	0	0	0	0	–	–	–	–	–

== Season to season ==
Season	Tier	Division	Place	Piala Indonesia
2016	1	ISC A	7th	–
2017	1	L1	1st	–
2018	1	L1	3rd	Quarter Final
2019	1	L1	4th	–
2020	1	L1	declared void	–
2021–22	1	L1	3rd	–
2022–23	1	L1	7th	–
2023–24	1	L1	17th	–
2024–25	2	L2	2nd	–
2025–26	1	SL	5th	–
2026–27	1	SL		–

Current league:

- 8 seasons in Super League
- 1 season in Championship

Defunct league:

- 1 season in ISC A

== Stadium ==
Bhayangkara FC played their home matches at the Greater Jakarta stadiums and trained at the PTIK Stadium, inside the Indonesian National Police higher learning centre in South Jakarta, for 2017–2020 seasons. When they won the 2017 Liga 1 season, the club used Patriot Chandrabhaga Stadium in Bekasi. For 2022–23 season, they used Wibawa Mukti Stadium as homebase. For 2025–26 season, they use Sumpah Pemuda Stadium as homebase.

== Supporters ==
Bhayangkara's supporters are called El Bhara and Sikambara Lampung.

== Sponsorship ==
The club is financially supported by a company owned by the police's traffic division. Sometimes, it can win external sponsorship but from conglomerates, such as Bakrie Group.

== Players ==
=== Current squad ===
As of August 2026

Note: Flags indicate national team as defined under FIFA eligibility rules; some limited exceptions apply. Players may hold more than one non-FIFA nationality.

No.	Pos.	Nation	Player
2	DF	IDN	Putu Gede
4	DF	MKD	Nehar Sadiki
5	MF	BRA	Moisés Gaúcho
6	DF	ARG	Kevin Sibille
7	FW	MKD	Milan Ristovski
9	FW	DEN	Anton Søjberg
10	MF	BRA	Allano
11	DF	IDN	Firza Andika
12	GK	IDN	Awan Setho (3rd captain)
14	MF	IDN	Raheem Nugraha
16	DF	ENG	George Brown
17	MF	MLI	Moussa Sidibé (captain)
19	MF	IDN	Teuku Ichsan
20	DF	IDN	Sani Rizki
22	FW	IDN	Ginanjar Wahyu
23	MF	IDN	Wahyu Subo Seto (vice-captain)
25	MF	IDN	Evandra Florasta

No.	Pos.	Nation	Player
26	DF	IDN	Ferre Murari
27	MF	IDN	Yano Putra
28	MF	ARG	Mauricio Vera
31	GK	IDN	Lewis Sidabutar
32	GK	IDN	Gyanendra Sampurno
33	DF	IDN	Made Andhika (on loan from Bali United)
41	DF	IDN	Muhammad Ferarri
45	DF	IDN	Rahmat Syahwal
58	DF	IDN	Frengky Missa
71	GK	IDN	Muhammad Fahri
74	FW	IDN	Mufdi Iskandar
77	MF	IDN	Danish Arkha
79	DF	IDN	Fandi Bagus
88	MF	IDN	Luke Xavier Keet
96	MF	IDN	Ryan Kurnia
97	MF	CRC	Jefferson Brenes
99	MF	URU	Matías Ocampo

=== Out on loan ===
Note: Flags indicate national team as defined under FIFA eligibility rules; some limited exceptions apply. Players may hold more than one non-FIFA nationality.

No.	Pos.	Nation	Player
—	FW	IDN	Muhammad Ragil (at PSMS Medan)
—	MF	IDN	Reza Kusuma (at PSPS Pekanbaru)

== Staff ==
Position	Name
CEO	(Indonesia) Agus Suryonugroho
COO	(Indonesia) Sumardji
Main commissioner	(Indonesia) Zainudin Amali
Team manager	(Indonesia) Reza Arifian
Technical director	(Indonesia) Miftahudin Mukson
Head coach	(Spain) Óscar Bruzón
Assistant coach	(Indonesia) Mustaqim
Fitness coach	(Sweden) Jamie Karl Steel
Goalkeeper coach	(Brazil) Luizinho Passos
Analyst	(Indonesia) Uzzy Assidra
Team doctor	(Indonesia) Septia Mandala
Physiotherapist	(Indonesia) Fahmi Fahriza
Physiotherapist	(Indonesia) Ilham Setyo Putra
Masseur	(Indonesia) Muhammad Toha
Masseur	(Indonesia) Syefrina Salsabila
Media officer	(Indonesia) Angga Bratama Putra
Kitman	(Indonesia) Taufik Usup

=== Head coach history ===
Head coach by years (2010–present)

Name	From	To
(Indonesia) Suwandi HS	2010	2011
(Indonesia) Subangkit	2011	2012
(Indonesia) Freddy Mulli	2011	2012
(Indonesia) Yusuf Ekodono	2012	2012
(Czech Republic) Miroslav Janu	2013	2013
(Indonesia) Tony Ho	2013	2013
(Indonesia) Rahmad Darmawan	2014	2014
(Indonesia) Ibnu Grahan	2015	2016
(Scotland) Simon McMenemy	2017	2018
(Northern Ireland) Paul Munster	2019	2022
(Indonesia) Agus Sugeng	2023	2023
(Indonesia) Widodo C. Putro	2023	2023
(Argentina) Mario Gómez	2023	2024
(Indonesia) Emral Abus	2024	2024
(Brazil) Gomes de Oliveira	2024	2024
(Indonesia) Hanim Sugiarto	2024	2025
(Northern Ireland) Paul Munster	2025	2026
(Spain) Óscar Bruzón	2026	Present
