= 2018 Persija Jakarta season =

Persija Jakarta
2018 season
- Owner: PT. Persija Jaya Jakarta
- Chairman: Gede Widiade
- Head Coach: Teco
- Stadium: Gelora Bung Karno; Sultan Agung; Pakansari; Patriot Chandrabhaga; Wibawa Mukti; PTIK
- Liga 1: 1st (champions)
- Piala Indonesia: Third round
- AFC Cup: ASEAN Zonal Semi-final
- Top goalscorer: League: Marko Šimić (18); All: Marko Šimić (27)
- Highest home attendance: 68,873 vs. Mitra Kukar (9 December 2018)
- Lowest home attendance: 670 vs. Persib Bandung (30 June 2018)
- Average home league attendance: 22,059
- Biggest win: PS TNI 0–5 Persija Jakarta (19 May 2018)
- Biggest defeat: Johor Darul Ta'zim 3–0 Persija Jakarta (14 February 2018); Persebaya Surabaya 3–0 Persija Jakarta (4 November 2018)
Home colours	Away colours	Third colours

The 2018 season is Persija Jakarta's 85th competitive season since 1933 and the 24th in a row in the top flight since 1994. Along with the Liga 1, the club competed in the Piala Indonesia and the AFC Cup, with the latter being their first appearance since 2001. The season covers the period from 1 January to 31 December 2018.

== Coaching staff ==
Position	Staff
First-team coach	(Brazil) Teco
Assistant coach	(Indonesia) Mustaqim
Assistant coach	(Indonesia) Yogie Nugraha
Goalkeeper coach	(Indonesia) Ahmad Fauzi
Physical coach	(Brazil) Antônio Cláudio de Jesus Oliveira
Physioterapy	(Indonesia) Muhammad Yanizar Lubis
Team doctor	(Indonesia) Donny Kurniawan

=== Other information ===
Chairman	(Indonesia) Gede Widiade
Manager	(Indonesia) Ardhi Tjahjoko
Chief Operating Officer	(Indonesia) Muhammad Rafil Perdana
Assistant Manager	(Indonesia) Abel Anmas
Match Organizing Committee	(Indonesia) Arief Perdanakusuma
Club Secretary	(Indonesia) Edy Syahputra
Media Officer	(Indonesia) Darwis Satmoko (Indonesia) Eko Romeo (Indonesia) Eko Yudhiono
Chief Commercial Officer	(Indonesia) Andhika Suksamana
Ground (capacity and dimensions)	Gelora Bung Karno (76,127 / 105x68 metres)
Training Ground	Lapangan Sutasoma 77

== Squad information ==
=== First-team squad ===
No.	Name	Nat.	Date of birth (age)	Signed in	Contract until	Signed from	Transfer Fee	Notes
Goalkeepers
1	Gianluca Pagliuca Rossy	(Indonesia)	25 July 1999 (age 27)	2018	2019	(Indonesia) Diklat Ragunan	Free	Under-23 Player
26	Andritany Ardhiyasa	(Indonesia)	26 December 1991 (age 34)	2010		(Indonesia) Sriwijaya	?	2nd Vice Captain
34	Daryono	(Indonesia)	5 March 1994 (age 32)	2013	2019	(Indonesia) Persija Jakarta U-21	Youth System	
88	Shahar Ginanjar	(Indonesia)	4 November 1990 (age 36)	2018	2018	(Indonesia) PSM Makassar	Loan Player	
Defenders
5	Jaimerson da Silva Xavier	(Brazil)	26 February 1990 (age 36)	2017		(Brazil) Figueirense	Free	Foreign Player
6	Maman Abdurrahman	(Indonesia)	12 May 1982 (age 44)	2016	2019	(Indonesia) Persita Tangerang	?	
13	Gunawan Dwi Cahyo	(Indonesia)	20 April 1989 (age 37)	2015	2019	(Indonesia) Mitra Kukar	?	
14	Ismed Sofyan	(Indonesia)	28 August 1979 (age 47)	2002		(Indonesia) Persijatim Jakarta Timur	?	Captain
18	Ammarsyahdi Al Hayandi	(Indonesia)		2018		(Indonesia) Persija Jakarta U-19	Youth System	Under-23 Player
28	Muhammad Rezaldi Hehanusa	(Indonesia)	7 November 1995 (age 31)	2016	2019	(Indonesia) Persitangsel Tangerang Selatan	?	Under-23 Player
43	Desly Nur Romandhiance	(Indonesia)	25 December 2000 (age 25)	2018	2019	(Indonesia) Persija Jakarta U-19	Youth System	Under-23 Player
81	Vava Mario Yagalo	(Indonesia)	21 April 1993 (age 33)	2014		(Indonesia) Persebaya Surabaya	?	
85	Michael Yansen Orah	(Indonesia)	3 July 1985 (age 41)	2018	2018	(Indonesia) Kalteng Putra F.C.	Loan Player	
Midfielders
7	Rizki Ramdani Lestaluhu	(Indonesia)	5 November 1991 (age 35)	2014	2019	(Indonesia) Sriwijaya	?	Originally from Youth system
11	Novri Setiawan	(Indonesia)	11 November 1993 (age 33)	2014		(Indonesia) Persebaya Surabaya	?	
16	Asri Akbar	(Indonesia)	29 January 1984 (age 42)	2017	2019	(Indonesia) Borneo	Free	
23	Nugroho Fatchurahman	(Indonesia)	8 September 1996 (age 30)	2018		(Indonesia) Persibo Bojonegoro	Free	Under-23 Player
24	Yan Pieter Nasadit	(Indonesia)	30 November 1996 (age 29)	2018		(Indonesia) Persipura Jayapura	Free	Under-23 Player
25	Riko Simanjuntak	(Indonesia)	26 January 1992 (age 34)	2017	2019	(Indonesia) Semen Padang	Free	
27	Fitra Ridwan Salam	(Indonesia)	16 March 1994 (age 32)	2017		(Indonesia) Persegres Gresik United	?	
29	Sandi Darma Sute	(Indonesia)	20 September 1992 (age 34)	2017	2019	(Indonesia) Borneo	?	
32	Rohit Chand	(Nepal)	1 March 1992 (age 34)	2017	2019	(Nepal) Manang Marshyangdi	?	Foreign Player
70	Renan Silva	(Brazil)	2 January 1989 (age 37)	2018	2018	(Kuwait) Al-Jahra SC	?	Foreign Player
77	Frengky Kogoya	(Indonesia)	22 June 1997 (age 29)	2018	2019	(Indonesia) PSPS Pekanbaru	Free	Under-23 Player
89	Septinus Alua	(Indonesia)	26 September 1989 (age 37)	2017	2019	(Indonesia) Perseru Serui	Free	
Forwards
9	Marko Šimić	(Croatia)	23 January 1989 (age 37)	2017	2019	(Malaysia) Melaka United	?	Foreign Player
10	Rudi Widodo	(Indonesia)	13 July 1983 (age 43)	2017		(Indonesia) Bhayangkara	?	
20	Bambang Pamungkas	(Indonesia)	10 June 1980 (age 46)	2015		(Indonesia) Pelita Bandung Raya	?	Vice Captain
79	Osas Saha	(Indonesia)	20 October 1986 (age 40)	2018	2019	Free Agent	Free	
99	Ahmad Syaifullah	(Indonesia)	21 January 1997 (age 29)	2017	2020	(Indonesia) Persepam Madura Utama	Free	Under-23 Player

== Pre-season ==
Win Draw Loss

=== Friendly Matches ===
27 December 2017 Friendly	Persija Jakarta	8–0	Mutiara Cempaka Utama	Ciputat, South Tangerang
15:00 (UTC+7)	Hermes 5', 7'; Junior Timbo 20', 41'; M Rasul 21', 35'; Rezaldi 40'; Ismed 90'			Stadium: ISCI Ground

30 December 2017 Friendly	Persija Jakarta	3–1	Persika Karawang	South Jakarta, DKI Jakarta
15:00 (UTC+7)	Jaimerson 30'; Ramdani 43' (pen.); Maman 57' (pen.)	Report	Husnudzhon 11'	Stadium: Soemantri Brodjonegoro Stadium

8 January 2018 Suramadu Super Cup	Madura United F.C.	2–2	Persija Jakarta	Bangkalan, East Java
19:00 (UTC+7)	Marcel 21' (pen.); Nuriddin 61'	Report	Riko 57'; Šimić 87'	Stadium: Gelora Bangkalan Stadium; Referee: Handri Kristanto (Semarang)

9 January 2018 Suramadu Super Cup	Kedah FA (Malaysia)	1–1	Persija Jakarta	Bangkalan, East Java
19:00 (UTC+7)	Hidhir 55'		Šimić 22'	Stadium: Gelora Bangkalan Stadium; Referee: Yudi Nurcahya (Bandung)

12 January 2018 Suramadu Super Cup	Persija Jakarta	0–1	Persela Lamongan	Bangkalan, East Java
15:30 (UTC+7)			Sugeng 40'	Stadium: Gelora Bangkalan Stadium

13 January 2018 Boost Sportsfix Super Cup	Ratchaburi Mitr Phol F.C. (Thailand)	1–3	Persija Jakarta	Bukit Jalil, Kuala Lumpur, Malaysia
20:00 (UTC+8)	Roller 28'	Report	Šimić 8'; Jaimerson 38'; Novri 53'	Stadium: Bukit Jalil National Stadium

16 January 2018 Boost Sportsfix Super Cup	Kelantan FA (Malaysia)	1–0	Persija Jakarta	Bukit Jalil, Kuala Lumpur, Malaysia
20:00 (UTC+8)	Bruno 76' (pen.)			Stadium: Bukit Jalil National Stadium

28 August 2018 Friendly	Bhayangkara F.C.	1–1	Persija Jakarta	South Jakarta, DKI Jakarta
16:00 (UTC+7)	Paulo Sergio 57' (pen.)	Report	Rudi 46'	Stadium: Perguruan Tinggi Ilmu Kepolisian Stadium

6 September 2018 Friendly	Persija Jakarta	1–2	Selangor FA (Malaysia)	Bekasi, West Java
19:00 (UTC+7)	Šimić 45+1' (pen.)	Report	Sean 26'; Rufino 90'	Stadium: Patriot Chandrabhaga Stadium; Referee: Musthofa Umarella (East Jakarta)

=== 2018 Indonesia President's Cup ===
==== Group stage ====
Pos	Team	Pld	W	D	L	GF	GA	GD	Pts	Qualification
1	Bali United (H)	3	3	0	0	9	6	+3	9	Advance to quarter-finals
2	Persija	3	2	0	1	7	3	+4	6	Advance to quarter-finals
3	Borneo	3	1	0	2	5	5	0	3	
4	PSPS Riau	3	0	0	3	2	9	−7	0	

Source: Piala Presiden 2018
Rules for classification: 1) Points; 2) Goal difference; 3) Goals scored; 4) Head-to-head; 5) Drawing.
(H) Hosts

Win Draw Loss

19 January 2018 2018 Indonesia President's Cup Group D	Persija Jakarta	3–0	PSPS Riau	Gianyar, Bali
20:30 (UTC+8)	Šimić 25'; Ismed 52' (pen.); Bambang 86'	Report		Stadium: Kapten I Wayan Dipta Stadium; Referee: Tabrani (Surabaya)

24 January 2018 2018 Indonesia President's Cup Group D	Borneo F.C.	0–2	Persija Jakarta	Gianyar, Bali
20:30 (UTC+8)		Report	Šimić 38' (pen.), 77'	Stadium: Kapten I Wayan Dipta Stadium; Attendance: 557; Referee: Aprisman Aranda (Padangpanjang)

29 January 2018 2018 Indonesia President's Cup Group D	Bali United F.C.	3–2	Persija Jakarta	Gianyar, Bali
20:30 (UTC+8)	Spasojević 9'; Brands 25' (pen.); Lilipaly 54' (pen.)	Report	Ivan Carlos 56' (pen.); Jaimerson 66'	Stadium: Kapten I Wayan Dipta Stadium; Attendance: 19,578; Referee: Prasetyo Hadi (Surabaya)

==== Knockout phase ====
4 February 2018 Quarter-final	Mitra Kukar F.C.	1–3	Persija Jakarta	Surakarta, Central Java
15:30 (UTC+7)	Rodríguez 71'	Report	Šimić 20', 45+1'; Bambang 86'	Stadium: Manahan Stadium; Attendance: 21,315; Referee: Oki Dwi Putra Senjaya (Bandung)

10 February 2018 Semi-finals 1st Leg	PSMS Medan	1–4	Persija Jakarta	Surakarta, Central Java
19:30 (UTC+7)	Yessoh 41'	Report	Šimić 4', 12', 74'; Jaimerson 15'	Stadium: Manahan Stadium; Attendance: 22,320; Referee: Djumadi Effendi (Malang)

12 February 2018 Semi-finals 2nd Leg	Persija Jakarta	1–0	PSMS Medan	Surakarta, Central Java
14:30 (UTC+7)	Šimić 60'	Report		Stadium: Manahan Stadium; Attendance: 6,978; Referee: Yudi Nurcahya (Bandung)

17 February 2018 Final	Persija Jakarta	3–0	Bali United F.C.	Central Jakarta, Special Capital Region of Jakarta
20:00 (UTC+7)	Šimić 20', 45+2'; Novri 63'	Report		Stadium: Gelora Bung Karno Stadium; Attendance: 70,255; Referee: Oki Dwi Putra Senjaya (Bandung)

== Competitions ==
=== Overview ===
Competition	Record								Started round	Final position / round	First match	Last match
Competition	G	W	D	L	GF	GA	GD	Win %	Started round	Final position / round	First match	Last match
Liga 1	34	18	8	8	53	36	+17	52.94	—	champions	23 March 2018	9 December 2018
Piala Indonesia	2	2	0	0	3	0	+3	100.00	First round — Zone 5	Runner-up	9 August 2018	
AFC Cup	8	4	1	3	16	12	+4	50.00	Group Stage	ASEAN Zonal Semi-final	14 February 2018	15 May 2018
Total	44	24	9	11	72	48	+24	54.55				

Updated to match played 13 December 2018
Source: Competitions

=== Liga 1 ===

Persija XI Go-Jek Liga 1 2018

==== League table ====
Locations of the 2018 Liga 1 teams

Pos	Team	Pld	W	D	L	GF	GA	GD	Pts	Qualification or relegation
1	Persija (C)	34	18	8	8	53	36	+17	62	Qualification for the AFC Champions League preliminary round 1
2	PSM	34	17	10	7	57	42	+15	61	Qualification for the AFC Cup group stage
3	Bhayangkara (Note: Bhayangkara would have qualified for the AFC Cup group stage had Persija qualified for the AFC Champions League group stage. As Persija failed to qualify for the AFC Champions League group stage, Bhayangkara's qualification in the AFC Cup was annulled.)	34	15	8	11	41	39	+2	53	
4	Persib	34	14	10	10	49	41	+8	52	
5	Persebaya	34	14	8	12	60	48	+12	50 (Note: Head-to-head results: Persebaya 1–0 Arema; Arema 1–0 Persebaya)	

Source: Go-Jek Liga 1, Soccerway
Rules for classification: 1) Points; 2) Head-to-head; 3) Goal difference; 4) Goals scored; 5) Drawing.
(C) Champions

==== Results summary ====
Overall								Home						Away					
Pld	W	D	L	GF	GA	GD	Pts	W	D	L	GF	GA	GD	W	D	L	GF	GA	GD
34	18	8	8	53	36	+17	62	11	4	2	26	12	+14	7	4	6	27	24	+3

Last updated: 10 December 2018.
Source: Soccerway

==== Results by matchday ====
Matchday	1	2	3	4	5	6	7	8	9	10	11	12	13	14	15	16	17	18	19	20	21	22	23	24	25	26	27	28	29	30	31	32	33	34
Ground	A	H	A	H	A	H	A	H	A	H	A	H	A	H	A	H	A	H	A	H	A	H	A	H	A	A	H	A	H	A	H	H	A	H
Result	D	W	L	W	W	L	L	W	L	W	D	W	L	D	D	L	W	W	D	D	W	W	L	W	W	W	W	L	D	D	W	W	W	W
Position	12	2	9	3	2	8	13	8	11	10	9	4	4	6	6	10	6	4	4	7	6	4	4	4	3	2	2	3	2	2	2	2	1	1

Updated to match(es) played on 10 December 2018. Source: Matches
A = Away; H = Home; W = Win; D = Draw; L = Loss

==== Matches ====
Win Draw Loss

First round

23 March 2018 1	Bhayangkara F.C.	0–0	Persija Jakarta	Central Jakarta, Special Capital Region of Jakarta
18:30 UTC+7		Report		Stadium: Gelora Bung Karno Stadium; Attendance: 39,425; Referee: Thoriq Munir Alkatiri (Bandung)

31 March 2018 2	Persija Jakarta	3–1	Arema F.C.	Central Jakarta, Special Capital Region of Jakarta
18:30 UTC+7	Šimić 27', 53'; Jaimerson 82'	Report	Ataýew 35'	Stadium: Gelora Bung Karno Stadium; Attendance: 62,273; Referee: Aprisman Aranda (Padangpanjang)

6 April 2018 3	PSMS Medan	3–1	Persija Jakarta	Medan, North Sumatera
15:30 UTC+7	Šimić 42' (og.); Lobo 44'; Suhandi 54'	Report	Rohit 23'	Stadium: Teladan Stadium; Attendance: 17,840; Referee: Prasetyo Hadi (Surabaya)

14 April 2018 4	Persija Jakarta	2–0	Borneo F.C.	Central Jakarta, Special Capital Region of Jakarta
18:30 UTC+7	Jaimerson 40'; Rohit 64'	Report		Stadium: Gelora Bung Karno Stadium; Attendance: 22,448; Referee: Agus Fauzan Arifin (Sleman)

20 April 2018 5	PSIS Semarang	1–4	Persija Jakarta	Bantul, Special Region of Yogyakarta
15:30 UTC+7	Melcior 90+3'	Report	Jaimerson 69'; Safrudin 81' (og.); Šimić 85'; Ramdani 90+2'	Stadium: Sultan Agung Stadium; Attendance: 18,600; Referee: Fariq Hitaba (Yogyakarta)

28 April 2018 6 (Postponed)	Persija Jakarta	P–P	Persib Bandung	Central Jakarta, Special Capital Region of Jakarta
18:30 UTC+7				Stadium: Gelora Bung Karno Stadium
Note: Persija Jakarta hosted Persib Bandung at PTIK Stadium on 30 June. Because it did not get the police permit.

6 May 2018 7 (Postponed)	Perseru Serui	P–P	Persija Jakarta	Yapen Islands Regency, Papua
15:30 UTC+9				Stadium: Marora Stadium
Note: Perseru Serui hosted Persija Jakarta at Marora Stadium on 3 July. Because Persija Jakarta must go to Singapore two days before the match against Home United in AFC Cup.

12 May 2018 8	Persija Jakarta	0–2	Madura United F.C.	Central Jakarta, Special Capital Region of Jakarta
21:00 UTC+7		Report	Fabiano 4'; Zah Rahan 79'	Stadium: Gelora Bung Karno Stadium; Attendance: 24,137; Referee: Thoriq Munir Alkatiri (Bandung)

20 May 2018 9	Persela Lamongan	2–0	Persija Jakarta	Lamongan, East Java
20:30 UTC+7	Assis 84'; Matsunaga 90+5'	Report		Stadium: Surajaya Stadium; Attendance: 15,787; Referee: Annas Apriliandi (Bandung)

25 May 2018 10	Persija Jakarta	2–0	Persipura Jayapura	Cibinong, Bogor Regency, West Java
20:30 UTC+7	Šimić 8'; Novri 77'	Report		Stadium: Pakansari Stadium; Attendance: 16,291; Referee: Prasetyo Hadi (Surabaya)

30 May 2018 11	PS Barito Putera	2–1	Persija Jakarta	Banjarmasin, South Kalimantan
21:30 UTC+8	Dandi 24'; Paulo 63'	Report	Šimić 90+4' (pen.)	Stadium: May 17th Stadium; Attendance: 8,021; Referee: Djumadi Effendi (Malang)

3 June 2018 12 (Postponed)	Persija Jakarta	P-P	Persebaya Surabaya	Bantul, Special Region of Yogyakarta
20:30 UTC+7				Stadium: Sultan Agung Stadium
Note: Persija Jakarta hosted Persebaya Surabaya at PTIK Stadium on 26 June. Because of supporters' riots before the match and security reasons.

8 June 2018 13	PS TIRA	0–5	Persija Jakarta	Bantul, Special Region of Yogyakarta
20:30 UTC+7		Report	Vava 1'; Bambang 6'; Addison 56'; Rezaldi 82'; Riko 85'	Stadium: Sultan Agung Stadium; Attendance: 3,605; Referee: Dwi Purba Adi Wicaksana (Kudus)

26 June 2018 12 (Replacement Match)	Persija Jakarta	1–1	Persebaya Surabaya	South Jakarta, Special Capital Region of Jakarta
18:30 UTC+7	Novri 51'	Report	Rishadi 20'	Stadium: PTIK Stadium; Attendance: 976; Referee: Aprisman Aranda (Padangpanjang)

30 June 2018 6 (Replacement Match)	Persija Jakarta	1–0	Persib Bandung	South Jakarta, Special Capital Region of Jakarta
18:30 UTC+7	Jaimerson 15'	Report		Stadium: PTIK Stadium; Attendance: 670; Referee: Faulur Rosy (Banda Aceh)

3 July 2018 7 (Replacement Match)	Perseru Serui	3–1	Persija Jakarta	Yapen Islands Regency, Papua
15:45 UTC+9	Donny 44'; Escobar 74'; Nabar 76'	Report	Šimić 81'	Stadium: Marora Stadium; Attendance: 837; Referee: Asep Yandis (Garut)

6 July 2018 14	Persija Jakarta	2–2	PSM Makassar	Bantul, Special Region of Yogyakarta
18:30 UTC+7	Osas 52'; Jaimerson 60'	Report	Guy 40'; Paulle 87'	Stadium: Sultan Agung Stadium; Attendance: 4,075; Referee: Dwi Purba Adi Wicaksana (Kudus)

10 July 2018 15	Sriwijaya F.C.	2–2	Persija Jakarta	Palembang, South Sumatera
18:30 UTC+7	Vizcarra 58', 68'	Report	Ivan 45+4'; Rezaldi 64'	Stadium: Gelora Sriwijaya Stadium; Attendance: 19,151; Referee: Prasetyo Hadi (Surabaya)

17 July 2018 16	Persija Jakarta	0–2	Bali United F.C.	Bantul, Special Region of Yogyakarta
18:30 UTC+7		Report	Platje 20'; Lilipaly 90+4'	Stadium: Sultan Agung Stadium; Attendance: 5,798; Referee: Armyn Dwi Suryathin (Lubuklinggau)

21 July 2018 17	Mitra Kukar F.C.	0–2	Persija Jakarta	Tenggarong, East Kalimantan
19:30 UTC+8		Report	Osas 7'; Šimić 27'	Stadium: Aji Imbut Stadium; Attendance: 2,180; Referee: Rully Ruslin Tambuntina (Malang)

Second round

27 July 2018 18	Persija Jakarta	1–0	Bhayangkara F.C.	Bantul, Special Region of Yogyakarta
18:30 UTC+7	Ismed 33'	Report		Stadium: Sultan Agung Stadium; Attendance: 3,723; Referee: Iwan Sukoco (Malang)

5 August 2018 19	Arema F.C.	1–1	Persija Jakarta	Malang, East Java
18:30 UTC+7	Konaté 90'	Report	Šimić 68'	Stadium: Kanjuruhan Stadium; Attendance: 44,912; Referee: Adi Riyanto (Kendal)

12 August 2018 20	Persija Jakarta	0–0	PSMS Medan	Bantul, Special Region of Yogyakarta
18:30 UTC+7		Report		Stadium: Sultan Agung Stadium; Attendance: 4,794; Referee: Fariq Hitaba (Yogyakarta)

12 September 2018 21	Borneo F.C.	0–1	Persija Jakarta	Tenggarong, East Kalimantan
19:30 UTC+8		Report	Novri 90+4'	Stadium: Aji Imbut Stadium; Attendance: 3,800; Referee: Yeni Krisdianto (Tulungagung)

18 September 2018 22	Persija Jakarta	1–0	PSIS Semarang	Bantul, Special Region of Yogyakarta
18:30 UTC+7	Riko 16'	Report		Stadium: Sultan Agung Stadium; Attendance: 7,431; Referee: Tabrani (Surabaya)

23 September 2018 23	Persib Bandung	3–2	Persija Jakarta	Bandung, West Java
16:00 UTC+7	N'Douassel 29'; Bauman 60' (pen.); Mališić 90+4'	Report	Jaimerson 45+5'; Rohit 65'	Stadium: Gelora Bandung Lautan Api Stadium; Attendance: 36,500; Referee: Yeni Krisdianto (Tulungagung)

8 October 2018 24	Persija Jakarta	2–1	Perseru Serui	Bekasi, West Java
16:00 UTC+7	Šimić 44' (pen.); Rudi 80'	Report	Beto 28'	Stadium: Patriot Chandrabhaga Stadium; Attendance: 16,772; Referee: Rully Ruslin Tambuntina (Malang)

14 October 2018 25	Madura United F.C.	0–1	Persija Jakarta	Pamekasan Regency, East Java
18:30 UTC+7		Report	Šimić 39'	Stadium: Gelora Ratu Pamelingan Stadium; Attendance: 5,126; Referee: Aprisman Aranda (Padangpanjang)

19 October 2018 26 (Postponed)	Persija Jakarta	P-P	Persela Lamongan	Bekasi, West Java
18:30 UTC+7		Report		Stadium: Patriot Chandrabhaga Stadium
Note: Persija Jakarta hosted Persela Lamongan at Gelora Bung Karno Main Stadium on 20 November. Because on the same day Patriot Chandrabhaga Stadium are used for the 2018 AFC U-19 Championship.

25 October 2018 27	Persipura Jayapura	1–2	Persija Jakarta	Jayapura, Papua
18:00 UTC+9	Salampessy 35'	Report	Riko 45+2'; Šimić 64'	Stadium: Mandala Stadium; Attendance: 9,131; Referee: Dwi Purba Adi Wicaksana (Kudus)

30 October 2018 28	Persija Jakarta	3–0	PS Barito Putera	Bekasi, West Java
15:30 UTC+7	Šimić 41' (pen.), 64'; Novri 45+2'	Report		Stadium: Patriot Chandrabhaga Stadium; Attendance: 20,457; Referee: Adi Riyanto (Kendal)

4 November 2018 29	Persebaya Surabaya	3–0	Persija Jakarta	Surabaya, East Java
18:30 UTC+7	Osvaldo 2'; Oktafianus 30'; Pahabol 78'	Report		Stadium: Gelora Bung Tomo Stadium; Attendance: 50,000; Referee: Handri Kristanto (Semarang)

10 November 2018 30	Persija Jakarta	0–0	PS TIRA	Cikarang, Bekasi Regency, West Java
15:30 UTC+7		Report		Stadium: Wibawa Mukti Stadium; Attendance: 25,779; Referee: Aprisman Aranda (Padangpanjang)

16 November 2018 31	PSM Makassar	2–2	Persija Jakarta	Makassar, South Sulawesi
16:30 UTC+8	Pellu 61'; Zulham 77'	Report	Jaimerson 8'; Abd. Rahman 28' (og.)	Stadium: Andi Mattalatta Stadium; Attendance: 14,898; Referee: Prasetyo Hadi (Surabaya)

20 November 2018 26 (Replacement Match)	Persija Jakarta	3–0	Persela Lamongan	Central Jakarta, Special Capital Region of Jakarta
15:30 UTC+7	Rezaldi 22'; Ramdani 52'; Šimić 72'	Report		Stadium: Gelora Bung Karno Main Stadium; Attendance: 60,590; Referee: Ikhsan Prasetya Jati (Bantul)

24 November 2018 32	Persija Jakarta	3–2	Sriwijaya F.C.	Cikarang, Bekasi Regency, West Java
15:30 UTC+7	Šimić 2'; Ramdani 31'; Maman 90+1'	Report	Dzhalilov 20'; Alan 63' (pen.)	Stadium: Wibawa Mukti Stadium; Attendance: 27,109; Referee: Iwan Sukoco (Malang)

2 December 2018 33	Bali United F.C.	1–2	Persija Jakarta	Gianyar Regency, Bali
19:30 UTC+8	Lilipaly 90+5'	Report	Sandi 7'; Šimić 84'	Stadium: Kapten I Wayan Dipta Stadium; Attendance: 20,042; Referee: Djumandi Effendi (Malang)

9 December 2018 34	Persija Jakarta	2–1	Mitra Kukar F.C.	Central Jakarta, Special Capital Region of Jakarta
15:30 UTC+7	Šimić 17' (pen.), 59'	Report	Aldino 88'	Stadium: Gelora Bung Karno Stadium; Attendance: 68,873; Referee: Prasetyo Hadi (Surabaya)

=== Piala Indonesia ===
==== First round ====
9 August 2018 1st Round – Zone 5	Persikabo Kabupaten Bogor (3)	0–2	(1) Persija Jakarta	Bantul, Special Region of Yogyakarta
15.30 (UTC+7)		Report	R. Silva 7' (pen.); Osas 82'	Stadium: Sultan Agung Stadium

==== Second round ====
12 December 2018 2nd Round – Zone 3	Bogor F.C. (3)	0–1	(1) Persija Jakarta	Gianyar, Bali
15.15 (UTC+8)		Report	Osas 18'	Stadium: Kapten I Wayan Dipta Stadium; Referee: Bachrul Ulum (Sidoarjo)

==== Third round ====
23 January 2019 3rd Round – West 1 1st Leg	Persija Jakarta (1)	8–2	757 Kepri Jaya F.C. (3)	Bekasi, West Java
15.00 (UTC+7)	Šimić 14', 27', 40', 64', 69'; Matos 36'; Novri 38'; Bambang 87'		Azis 50'; Nanang 56'	Stadium: Patriot Candrabhaga Stadium; Referee: Fariq Hitaba (Yogyakarta)

31 January 2019 3rd Round – West 1 2nd Leg	757 Kepri Jaya F.C. (3)	1–1 (3–9 agg.)	Persija Jakarta (1)	Batam, Riau Islands
15.00 (UTC+7)	Lutfi 42'		Ismed 44'	Stadium: Gelora Citramas Stadium; Referee: Aprisman Aranda (Padangpanjang)

==== Round of 16 ====
17 February 2019 Round of 16 West – 1st Leg	TIRA-Persikabo (1)	2–2	Persija Jakarta (1)	Cibinong, Bogor Regency, West Java
15.00 (UTC+7)	Arnaud 37'; Ciro 44'		Bruno 38', 78' (pen.)	Stadium: Pakansari Stadium; Referee: Aprisman Aranda (Padangpanjang)

21 February 2019 Round of 16 West – 2nd Leg	Persija Jakarta (1)	2–0 (4–2 agg.)	TIRA-Persikabo (1)	Bekasi, West Java
15.00 (UTC+7)	Fitra 2'; Ryuji 73'	Report		Stadium: Patriot Chandrabhaga Stadium; Attendance: 13,825; Referee: Adi Riyanto (Kendal)

==== Quarter-final ====
26 April 2019 Quarter-finals – 1st Leg	Bali United (1)	2–1	Persija (1)	Gianyar, Bali
16:30 (UTC+8)	Lilipaly 52', 80'	Report	Bambang 85'	Stadium: Kapten I Wayan Dipta Stadium; Referee: Oki Dwi Putra (Bandung)

5 May 2019 Quarter-finals – 2nd Leg	Persija (1)	1–0 ((a)2–2 agg.)	Bali United (1)	Cikarang, West Java
15.15 (UTC+7)	Ismed 58' (pen.)	Report		Stadium: Wibawa Mukti Stadium; Attendance: 26,291; Referee: Handri Kristanto (Semarang)

==== Semi-final ====
29 June 2019 Semi-finals – 1st Leg	Persija (1)	2–1	Borneo (1)	Cikarang, Bekasi Regency, West Java
15.30 (UTC+7)	Nasadit 2'; Bambang 90+6'	Report	Terens 38'	Stadium: Wibawa Mukti Stadium; Attendance: 20,033; Referee: Wawan Rapiko (Pekanbaru)

6 July 2019 Semi-finals – 2nd Leg	Borneo (1)	1-1 (2-3 agg.)	Persija (1)	Samarinda, East Kalimantan
16.30 (UTC+8)	Silva 59'	Report	Ismed 33'	Stadium: Segiri Stadium; Referee: Rully Ruslin Tambutina (Malang Regency)

==== Final ====
21 July 2019 Final – 1st Leg	Persija Jakarta	1-0	PSM Makassar	Central Jakarta, Special Capital Region of Jakarta
15.30	Ryuji 87'	Report		Stadium: Gelora Bung Karno Main Stadium; Attendance: 70,306; Referee: Dwi Purba Adi Wicaksana (Kudus Regency)

28 July 2019 Final – 2nd Leg [Postponed]	PSM Makassar (0)	P-P	Persija Jakarta (1)	Makassar, South Sulawesi
15.30				Stadium: Andi Mattalatta Stadium
Note: PSM Makassar hosted Persija Jakarta at Andi Mattalatta Stadium on 6 August 2019 due to an attack on the Persija team bus when several players and officials were injured.

6 August 2019 Final – 2nd Leg [Replacement Match]	PSM Makassar (2)	2-0	Persija Jakarta (1)	Makassar, South Sulawesi
15.30	Evans 3'; Zulham 50'	Report		Stadium: Andi Mattalatta Stadium; Attendance: 14,997; Referee: Fariq Hitaba (Yogyakarta)

=== AFC Cup ===
==== Group stage ====
Pos	Team	Pld	W	D	L	GF	GA	GD	Pts	Qualification
1	(Indonesia) Persija Jakarta	6	4	1	1	13	6	+7	13	Zonal semi-finals
2	(Vietnam) Sông Lam Nghệ An	6	3	1	2	8	5	+3	10 (Note: Head-to-head results: Sông Lam Nghệ An 2–0 Johor Darul Ta'zim, Johor Darul Ta'zim 3–2 Sông Lam Nghệ An.)	
3	(Malaysia) Johor Darul Ta'zim	6	3	1	2	8	9	−1	10	
4	(Singapore) Tampines Rovers	6	0	1	5	5	14	−9	1	

Source: AFC
Rules for classification: Group stage tiebreakers
Notes:

Win Draw Loss

14 February 2018 Matchday 1	Johor Darul Ta'zim (Malaysia)	3–0	(Indonesia) Persija Jakarta	Johor Bahru, Malaysia
20:45 UTC+08:00	Hazwan 29'; Díaz 42'; Safawi 76'	Report		Stadium: Tan Sri Dato' Haji Hassan Yunos Stadium; Attendance: 18,600; Referee: Saoud Al-Athbah (Qatar)

28 February 2018 Matchday 2	Persija Jakarta (Indonesia)	4–1	(Singapore) Tampines Rovers	Central Jakarta, Indonesia
18:30 UTC+7	Šimić 12', 74', 86'; Rezaldi 41'	Report	Khairul 77'	Stadium: Gelora Bung Karno Stadium; Attendance: 49,056; Referee: Kim Woo-sung (South Korea)

6 March 2018 Matchday 3	Sông Lam Nghệ An (Vietnam)	0–0	(Indonesia) Persija Jakarta	Vinh, Nghệ An, Vietnam
15:30 UTC+7		Report		Stadium: Vinh Stadium; Attendance: 10,000; Referee: Çarymyrat Kurbanow (Turkmenistan)

14 March 2018 Matchday 4	Persija Jakarta (Indonesia)	1–0	(Vietnam) Sông Lam Nghệ An	Central Jakarta, Indonesia
18:30 UTC+7	Addison 90+3'	Report		Stadium: Gelora Bung Karno Stadium; Attendance: 46,184; Referee: Ho Wai-Sing (Hong Kong)

10 April 2018 Matchday 5	Persija Jakarta (Indonesia)	4–0	(Malaysia) Johor Darul Ta'zim	Central Jakarta, Indonesia
18:30 UTC+7	Šimić 8', 12', 19', 87' (pen.)	Report		Stadium: Gelora Bung Karno Stadium; Attendance: 60,157; Referee: Sivakorn Pu-udom (Thailand)

24 April 2018 Matchday 6	Tampines Rovers (Singapore)	2–4	(Indonesia) Persija Jakarta	Kallang, Singapore
20:00 UTC+8	Webb 27'; Fazrul 80'	Report	Rezaldi 23'; Šimić 45+1'; Novri 51'; Addison 72'	Stadium: Jalan Besar Stadium; Attendance: 1,260; Referee: Rowan Arumughan (India)

==== Knockout phase ====
===== ASEAN Zonal semi-finals =====
8 May 2018 First leg	Home United (Singapore)	3–2	(Indonesia) Persija Jakarta	Kallang, Singapore
19:30 UTC+8	Maman 2' (og.); Song 9'; Hafiz 79'	Report	Ramdani 32', 49'	Stadium: Jalan Besar Stadium; Attendance: 1,528; Referee: Mooud Bonyadifar (Iran)

15 May 2018 Second leg	Persija Jakarta (Indonesia)	1–3 (3–6 agg.)	(Singapore) Home United	Central Jakarta, Indonesia
19:30 UTC+7	Šimić 9' (pen.)	Report	Shahril 6', 12'; Song 44'	Stadium: Gelora Bung Karno Stadium; Attendance: 62,198; Referee: Turki Al-Khudhayr (Saudi Arabia)

== Statistics ==
=== Squad appearances and goals ===
Last updated on 14 December 2018.

No.	Pos	Nat	Player	Total		Liga 1		Piala Indonesia		AFC Cup	
No.	Pos	Nat	Player	Apps	Goals	Apps	Goals	Apps	Goals	Apps	Goals
Goalkeepers
1	GK	(Indonesia) IDN	Gianluca Pagliuca Rossy	0	0	0	0	0	0	0	0
26	GK	(Indonesia) IDN	Andritany Ardhiyasa	25	0	19	0	0	0	6	0
34	GK	(Indonesia) IDN	Daryono	7	0	5	0	2	0	0	0
88	GK	(Indonesia) IDN	Shahar Ginanjar	10	0	10	0	0	0	0	0
Defenders
5	DF	(Brazil) BRA	Jaimerson da Silva Xavier	36	7	29+1	7	0	0	6	0
6	DF	(Indonesia) IDN	Maman Abdurrahman	32	1	25	1	0	0	7	0
13	DF	(Indonesia) IDN	Gunawan Dwi Cahyo	14	0	10	0	2	0	1+1	0
14	DF	(Indonesia) IDN	Ismed Sofyan	32	1	25	1	0	0	7	0
18	DF	(Indonesia) IDN	Amarsyahdi Al-Hayandi	1	0	0	0	0+1	0	0	0
28	DF	(Indonesia) IDN	Muhammad Rezaldi Hehanusa	25	5	19	3	0	0	6	2
43	DF	(Indonesia) IDN	Desly Nur Romandhiance	0	0	0	0	0	0	0	0
81	DF	(Indonesia) IDN	Vava Mario Yagalo	13	1	6+3	1	2	0	2	0
85	DF	(Indonesia) IDN	Michael Yansen Orah	12	0	9+2	0	1	0	0	0
41	DF	(Indonesia) IDN	Anan Lestaluhu	6	0	3+1	0	2	0	0	0
Midfielders
7	MF	(Indonesia) IDN	Rizki Ramdani Lestaluhu	40	5	26+7	3	0	0	7	2
11	MF	(Indonesia) IDN	Novri Setiawan	36	5	26+4	4	1	0	5	1
16	MF	(Indonesia) IDN	Asri Akbar	26	0	6+15	0	1+1	0	1+2	0
23	MF	(Indonesia) IDN	Nugroho Fatchurahman	7	0	0+4	0	1	0	0+2	0
24	MF	(Indonesia) IDN	Yan Pieter Nasadit	12	0	4+5	0	1	0	0+2	0
25	MF	(Indonesia) IDN	Riko Simanjuntak	35	3	26+1	3	0	0	7+1	0
27	MF	(Indonesia) IDN	Fitra Ridwan	21	0	6+9	0	1+1	0	0+4	0
29	MF	(Indonesia) IDN	Sandi Darma Sute	34	1	25+1	1	0	0	8	0
32	MF	(Nepal) NEP	Rohit Chand	38	3	27+4	3	0	0	7	0
70	MF	(Brazil) BRA	Renan da Silva	14	1	11+2	0	1	1	0	0
77	MF	(Indonesia) IDN	Frengky Kogoya	5	0	0+4	0	0+1	0	0	0
89	MF	(Indonesia) IDN	Septinus Alua	7	0	0+3	0	1+1	0	0+2	0
Forwards
9	FW	(Croatia) CRO	Marko Šimić	38	27	29+1	18	0+1	0	7	9
10	FW	(Indonesia) IDN	Rudi Widodo	16	1	2+9	1	2	0	2+1	0
20	FW	(Indonesia) IDN	Bambang Pamungkas	19	1	3+10	1	2	0	1+3	0
79	FW	(Indonesia) IDN	Osas Marvelous Ikpefua Saha	15	4	9+4	2	2	2	0	0
99	FW	(Indonesia) IDN	Ahmad Syaifullah	3	0	1+1	0	0	0	0+1	0
Players who have made an appearance or had a squad number this season but have left the club
3	DF	(Indonesia) IDN	Dany Saputra	2	0	1+1	0	0	0	0	0
4	DF	(Indonesia) IDN	Aed Tri Oka	0	0	0	0	0	0	0	0
8	FW	(Brazil) BRA	Ivan Carlos França Coelho	3	1	1+2	1	0	0	0	0
15	FW	(Brazil) BRA	Addison Alves de Oliveira	19	3	7+4	1	0	0	3+5	2
17	DF	(Indonesia) IDN	Marco Markus Kabiay	2	0	1	0	0	0	1	0
21	DF	(Indonesia) IDN	Bernardus Valentino Telaubun	7	0	3+2	0	0	0	2	0
22	MF	(Indonesia) IDN	Arthur Barrios Bonai	0	0	0	0	0	0	0	0
30	GK	(Indonesia) IDN	Muhammad Rizky Darmawan	2	0	0	0	0	0	2	0
44	MF	(Indonesia) IDN	Muhammad Rasul	0	0	0	0	0	0	0	0

Last updated: 14 December 2018.
Source: Soccerway

=== Top scorers ===
The list is sorted by shirt number when total goals are equal.

Rnk	Pos	No.	Player	Liga 1	Piala Indonesia	AFC Cup	Total
1	CF	9	(Croatia) Marko Šimić	18	0	9	27
2	CB	5	(Brazil) Jaimerson da Silva Xavier	7	0	0	7
3	CM	7	(Indonesia) Rizki Ramdani Lestaluhu	3	0	2	5
3	LW	11	(Indonesia) Novri Setiawan	4	0	1	5
3	LB	28	(Indonesia) Muhammad Rezaldi Hehanusa	3	0	2	5
4	CF	79	(Indonesia) Osas Marvelous Ikpefua	2	2	0	4
5	CF	8	(Brazil) Addison Alves de Oliveira	1	0	2	3
5	RW	25	(Indonesia) Riko Simanjuntak	3	0	0	3
5	CM	32	(Nepal) Rohit Chand Thakuri	3	0	0	3
Own goals				2	0	0	2
6	CB	5	(Brazil) Maman Abdurrahman	1	0	0	1
6	CF	8	(Brazil) Ivan Carlos França Coelho	1	0	0	1
6	FW	10	(Indonesia) Rudi Widodo	1	0	0	1
6	RB	14	(Indonesia) Ismed Sofyan	1	0	0	1
6	CF	20	(Indonesia) Bambang Pamungkas	1	0	0	1
6	MF	29	(Indonesia) Sandi Darma Sute	1	0	0	1
6	CB	81	(Indonesia) Vava Yagalo	1	0	0	1
6	MF	70	(Brazil) Renan da Silva	0	1	0	1
Total				53	3	16	72

Last updated: 16 December 2018.
Source: Soccerway

=== Clean sheets ===
The list is sorted by shirt number when total clean sheets are equal.

Rnk	No.	Player	Liga 1	Piala Indonesia	AFC Cup	Total
1	26	(Indonesia) Andritany Ardhiyasa	7	0	3	10
2	88	(Indonesia) Shahar Ginanjar	5	0	0	5
3	34	(Indonesia) Daryono	2	2	0	4
Total			14	2	3	19

Last updated: 18 December 2018.
Source: Soccerway

=== Disciplinary record ===
Includes all competitive matches. Players listed below made at least one appearance for Persija Jakarta first squad during the season.

Rnk	No.	Pos.	Nat.	Name	Liga 1			Piala Indonesia			AFC Cup			Total			Notes
Rnk	No.	Pos.	Nat.	Name	Yellow card	Second yellow card	Red card	Yellow card	Second yellow card	Red card	Yellow card	Second yellow card	Red card	Yellow card	Second yellow card	Red card	Notes
1	5	DF	(Brazil)	Jaimerson da Silva Xavier	7	0	0	0	0	0	3	2	0	10	2	0	
2	29	MF	(Indonesia)	Sandi Darma Sute	8	0	0	0	0	0	1	0	0	9	0	0	
3	28	DF	(Indonesia)	Muhammad Rezaldi Hehanusa	8	0	0	0	0	0	0	0	0	8	0	0	
4	16	MF	(Indonesia)	Asri Akbar	4	0	0	0	0	0	1	0	0	5	0	0	
4	70	DF	(Indonesia)	Renan da Silva	5	0	0	0	0	0	0	0	0	5	0	0	
5	32	MF	(Nepal)	Rohit Chand Thakuri	3	0	0	0	0	0	1	0	0	4	0	0	
5	9	FW	(Croatia)	Marko Šimić	3	0	0	0	0	0	1	0	0	4	0	0	
6	34	GK	(Indonesia)	Daryono	0	0	0	0	0	0	0	0	1	0	0	1	(Note: Daryono has been sent off in the match against Home United at AFC Cup for causing trouble from the bench, despite not playing any part in the match.)
6	11	MF	(Indonesia)	Novri Setiawan	2	0	0	0	0	0	1	0	0	3	0	0	
6	14	RB	(Indonesia)	Ismed Sofyan	3	0	0	0	0	0	0	0	0	3	0	0	
6	6	DF	(Indonesia)	Maman Abdurrahman	3	0	0	0	0	0	0	0	0	3	0	0	
6	13	DF	(Indonesia)	Gunawan Dwi Cahyo	3	0	0	0	0	0	0	0	0	3	0	0	
7	10	FW	(Indonesia)	Rudi Widodo	1	0	0	0	0	0	1	0	0	2	0	0	
7	17	DF	(Indonesia)	Marco Kabiay	1	0	0	0	0	0	1	0	0	2	0	0	
7	21	DF	(Indonesia)	Bernardus Valentino Telaubun	1	0	0	0	0	0	1	0	0	2	0	0	
7	7	MF	(Indonesia)	Rizki Ramdani Lestaluhu	2	0	0	0	0	0	0	0	0	2	0	0	
7	25	RW	(Indonesia)	Riko Simanjuntak	2	0	0	0	0	0	0	0	0	2	0	0	
7	27	MF	(Indonesia)	Fitra Ridwan Salam	2	0	0	0	0	0	0	0	0	2	0	0	
7	85	DF	(Indonesia)	Michael Yansen Orah	2	0	0	0	0	0	0	0	0	2	0	0	
8	8	FW	(Brazil)	Ivan Carlos	1	0	0	0	0	0	0	0	0	1	0	0	
8	18	DF	(Indonesia)	Amarsyahadi	1	0	0	0	1	0	0	0	0	0	1	0	
8	24	MF	(Indonesia)	Yan Pieter Kornelis Nasadit	1	0	0	0	0	0	0	0	0	1	0	0	
8	79	FW	(Indonesia)	Osas Marvelous Ikpefua	1	0	0	0	0	0	0	0	0	1	0	0	
8	81	DF	(Indonesia)	Vava Mario Yagalo	1	0	0	0	0	0	0	0	0	1	0	0	
8	89	DF	(Indonesia)	Septinus Alua	1	0	0	0	0	0	0	0	0	1	0	0	
8	99	MF	(Indonesia)	Ahmad Syaifullah	1	0	0	0	0	0	0	0	0	1	0	0	

Last updated: 14 December 2018
Source: Competitions
Only competitive matches
(yellow card) = Number of bookings; (second yellow card) = Number of sending offs after a second yellow card; (red card) = Number of sending offs by a direct red card. Notes:

=== Summary ===
Games played	43 (34 Liga 1), (8 AFC Cup), (2 Piala Indonesia)
Games won	23 (18 Liga 1), (4 AFC Cup), (2 Piala Indonesia)
Games drawn	9 (8 Liga 1), (1 AFC Cup)
Games lost	11 (8 Liga 1), (3 AFC Cup)
Goals scored	71 (52 Liga 1), (16 AFC Cup), (3 Piala Indonesia)
Goals conceded	48 (36 Liga 1), (12 AFC Cup)
Goal difference	+23 (+17 Liga 1), (+4 AFC Cup), (+3 Piala Indonesia)
Clean sheets	18 (14 Liga 1), (3 AFC Cup), (2 Piala Indonesia)
Yellow cards	77 (66 Liga 1), (11 AFC Cup), (1 Piala Indonesia)
Red cards	3 (3 AFC Cup)
Most appearances	(Indonesia) Rizki Ramdani Lestaluhu (40 Appearances)
Top scorer	(Croatia) Marko Šimić (27 Goals)
Top assist	(Indonesia) Riko Simanjuntak (16 Assists)
Winning Percentage	24/44 (54.55%)

Last updated: 14 December 2018.
Source: Liga 1

== New contracts ==
No.	Pos	Player/Staff	Contract length	Contract end	Date	Source
—	Head coach	(Brazil) Stefano Cugurra Teco	1 year	2018	28 November 2017	
13	CB	(Indonesia) Gunawan Dwi Cahyo	2 years	2019	4 December 2017	
34	GK	(Indonesia) Daryono	2 years	2019	4 December 2017	
6	CB	(Indonesia) Maman Abdurrahman	2 years	2019	5 December 2017	
28	LB	(Indonesia) Rezaldi Hehanusa	2 years	2019	5 December 2017	
29	CM	(Indonesia) Sandi Sute	2 years	2019	5 December 2017	
7	CM	(Indonesia) Ramdani Lestaluhu	2 years	2019	7 December 2017	
30	GK	(Indonesia) Rizky Darmawan	2 years	2019	7 December 2017	
32	CM	(Nepal) Rohit Chand	1 year	2019	3 January 2018	

== Transfers ==
=== In ===
No.	Pos	Player	Transferred From	Fee	Date	Source
89	CM	(Indonesia) Septinus Alua	(Indonesia) Perseru Serui	Free	27 November 2017	
31	CB	(Indonesia) Arthur Irawan	(Indonesia) Borneo	End of Loan	30 November 2017	
22	CM	(Indonesia) Arthur Barrios Bonai	(Indonesia) Perseru Serui	Free	30 November 2017	
21	LB	(Indonesia) Bernardus Valentino Telaubun	(Indonesia) Barito Putera	Free	30 November 2017	
99	ST	(Indonesia) Ahmad Syaifullah	(Indonesia) Persepam Madura Utama	Free	30 November 2017	
77	LM	(Indonesia) Jefri Kurniawan	(Indonesia) Borneo	End of Loan	1 December 2017	
17	CB	(Indonesia) Marco Markus Kabiay	(Indonesia) Arema	Free	14 December 2017	
16	CM	(Indonesia) Asri Akbar	(Indonesia) Borneo	Free	18 December 2017	
3	LB	(Indonesia) Dany Saputra	(Indonesia) Bhayangkara	Free	19 December 2017	
23	CM	(Indonesia) Nugroho Fatchurahman	(Indonesia) Persibo Bojonegoro	Free	24 December 2017	
25	LW	(Indonesia) Riko Simanjuntak	(Indonesia) Semen Padang	Free	24 December 2017	
5	CB	(Brazil) Jaimerson	(Brazil) Figueirense	Free	26 December 2017	
9	ST	(Croatia) Marko Šimić	(Malaysia) Melaka United	Free	28 December 2017	
—	CB	(Indonesia) Muhammad Idham Jauhari	(Indonesia) Cilegon United	End of Loan	1 January 2018	
44	AM	(Indonesia) Muhammad Rasul	(Indonesia) Sragen United	End of Loan	1 January 2018	
8	AM	(Brazil) Ivan Carlos	(Indonesia) Persela Lamongan	Free	7 January 2018	
24	AM	(Indonesia) Yan Pieter Nasadit	(Indonesia) Persipura Jayapura	Free	16 January 2018	
15	ST	(Brazil) Addison Alves de Oliveira	(Indonesia) Persipura Jayapura	Free	8 February 2018	
1	GK	(Indonesia) Gianluca Pagliuca Rossy Pratama	(Indonesia) Diklat Ragunan	Free	22 March 2018	
77	RW	(Indonesia) Frengky Kogoya	(Indonesia) PSPS Pekanbaru	Free	29 March 2018	
79	CF	(Indonesia) Osas Saha	Free Agent	Free	23 May 2018	
70	AM	(Brazil) Renan da Silva	(Kuwait) Al-Jahra SC	Free	24 July 2018	

=== Out ===
No.	Pos	Player	Transferred To	Fee	Date	Source
33	CB	(Brazil) Willian Pacheco	(Malaysia) Selangor	Free	30 November 2017	
4	CB	(Indonesia) Ryuji Utomo	(Thailand) PTT Rayong	Free	4 December 2017	
3	LM	(Indonesia) Irfandy Zein Alzubeidy	(Indonesia) PS TIRA	End of Loan	5 December 2017	
8	CM	(Indonesia) Sutanto Tan	(Indonesia) Bali United	Released	5 December 2017	
21	CM	(Indonesia) Amarzukih	(Indonesia) PSMS Medan	Released	5 December 2017	
31	CB	(Indonesia) Arthur Irawan	(Indonesia) Persebaya Surabaya	Released	5 December 2017	
18	CM	(Indonesia) Muhammad Hargianto	(Indonesia) Bhayangkara	End of Loan	21 December 2017	
17	LW	(Indonesia) Ambrizal Umanailo	(Indonesia) Borneo	Free	24 December 2017	
50	ST	(Brazil) Bruno Lopes	(Malaysia) Kelantan	Free	29 December 2017	
88	ST	(Brazil) Reinaldo Elias da Costa	Free Agent	Released	29 December 2017	
—	CB	(Indonesia) Muhammad Idham Jauhari	Free Agent	Released	1 January 2018	
70	RM	(Indonesia) Pandi Lestaluhu	(Indonesia) PS TIRA	End of Loan	1 January 2018	
85	LB	(Indonesia) Michael Orah	(Indonesia) Borneo	End of Loan	1 January 2018	
22	CM	(Indonesia) Arthur Barrios Bonai	(Indonesia) Perseru Serui	Free	27 March 2018	
17	RB	(Indonesia) Marco Markus Kabiay	Free Agent	Released	8 July 2018	
15	ST	(Brazil) Addison Alves	(Indonesia) Persipura Jayapura	Free	6 July 2018	
8	AM	(Brazil) Ivan Carlos França Coelho	(Cyprus) Alki Oroklini	Released	24 July 2018	
21	LB	(Indonesia) Bernardus Valentino Telaubun	(Indonesia) Persipura Jayapura	Free	27 July 2017	
4	CB	(Indonesia) Aed Tri Oka	Free Agent	Released	27 July 2017	

=== Loan In ===
No.	Pos	Player	Loaned From	Start	End	Source
88	GK	(Indonesia) Shahar Ginanjar	(Indonesia) PSM Makassar	23 July 2018	31 December 2018	
85	LB	(Indonesia) Michael Yansen Orah	(Indonesia) Kalteng Putra F.C.	31 July 2018	31 December 2018	

=== Loan Out ===
No.	Pos	Player	Loaned to	Start	End	Source
77	LM	(Indonesia) Jefri Kurniawan	(Indonesia) Arema	9 December 2017	8 December 2018	
3	LB	(Indonesia) Dany Saputra	(Indonesia) Bhayangkara F.C.	8 July 2018	31 December 2018	
30	GK	(Indonesia) Muhammad Rizky Darmawan	(Indonesia) Persita Tangerang	23 July 2018	31 December 2018	
44	AM	(Indonesia) Muhammad Rasul	(Indonesia) Kalteng Putra F.C.	27 July 2018	31 December 2018	
