= 2015 Persija Jakarta season =

Persija Jakarta
2015 season
- Chairman: Ferry Paulus
- Head Coach: Rahmad Darmawan
- Stadium: Gelora Bung Karno
- Indonesia Super League: TBD

The 2015 Persija Jakarta season is the seventh season competing in the Indonesia Super League for Persija Jakarta.

== Matches ==
=== Legend ===
Win Draw Loss Postponed

=== Friendlies ===
Date	KO	Stadium	City	Opponent	Result^{4}	Attendance	Goalscorers		Source
Date	KO	Stadium	City	Opponent	Result^{4}	Attendance	Persija Jakarta	Opponent	Source
6 Januari 2015		H	Jakarta	Martapura	2 – 1		Rudi 68'; Tuasalamony 75'	Asamsum 16'	
11 Januari 2015		H	Jakarta	Sriwijaya	0 – 0; 3 – 5p		Pamungkas (penalty scored); Sofyan (penalty scored); Kabayev (penalty scored); Tuasalamony (penalty missed)	(penalty scored) Vaquero; (penalty scored) Maïga; (penalty scored) Asri; (penalty scored) Syakir; (penalty scored) Sinaga	
11 Januari 2015		H	Jakarta	Arema Cronus	0 – 0; 4 – 2p		Pamungkas (penalty scored); Aciar (penalty missed); Vunk (penalty scored); Sofyan (penalty scored); Cahya (penalty scored)	Revi (penalty missed); Arif (penalty missed); Beltrame (penalty scored); Sukadana (penalty scored)	
15 January 2015		H	Depok	Cilegon United	3 – 0		Adam 21'; Levandy; Novri 79'		
18 January 2015		N	Padang	Sriwijaya	0 – 1			Sinaga 70'	
19 January 2015		N	Padang	Bhayangkara F.C.	1 – 1		Ambrizal 73'	Dutra 87' (pen.)	
21 January 2015		N	Padang	Semen Padang	4 – 1		Kabayev 16' (pen.), 62'; Tuasalamony 53'; Lilipaly 58'	Mofu 20'	
24 Januari 2015		H	Jakarta	Gamba Osaka	0 – 4			Usami 35'; Lins 56', 72'; Patric 86'	
4 February 2015		H	Jakarta	Barito Putera	2 – 1		R. Lestaluhu 28'; Kabayev 88'	Antony 84'	

=== Indonesia Super League ===
Date	KO	Stadium	City	Opponent	Result^{4}	Attendance	Goalscorers		Source
Date	KO	Stadium	City	Opponent	Result^{4}	Attendance	Persija Jakarta	Opponent	Source
5 April 2015	18:50	A	Malang	Arema Cronus	4 – 4	22,619	Pamungkas 19' (pen.), 29', 75'; Nwokolo 82'	Gonzáles 90'; Samsul 30'; Beltrame 38', 90+4' (pen.)	
7 April 2015	19:00	A	Lamongan	Persela Lamongan	0 – 1	9,500		Pagbe 90'	

== Statistics ==
=== Squad ===
As of 7 April 2015.

No.	Pos	Nat	Player	Total		Indonesia Super League		Piala Indonesia	
No.	Pos	Nat	Player	Apps	Goals	Apps	Goals	Apps	Goals
3	DF	(Indonesia) IDN	Vava Mario Yagalo	2	0	2	0	0	0
4	DF	(Indonesia) IDN	Syaiful Cahya	1	0	1	0	0	0
5	DF	(Indonesia) IDN	Alfin Tuasalamony	2	0	2	0	0	0
6	MF	(Indonesia) IDN	Ambrizal	2	0	2	0	0	0
7	MF	(Indonesia) IDN	Ramdhani Lestaluhu	2	0	2	0	0	0
9	FW	(Indonesia) IDN	Stefano Lilipaly	0	0	0	0	0	0
10	FW	(Indonesia) IDN	Greg Nwokolo	2	1	2	1	0	0
11	FW	(Indonesia) IDN	Rudi Setiawan	0	0	0	0	0	0
14	DF	(Indonesia) IDN	Ismed Sofyan (vice-captain)	2	0	2	0	0	0
16	MF	(Indonesia) IDN	Delton Stevano	0	0	0	0	0	0
17	MF	(Indonesia) IDN	Mahadirga Lasut	0	0	0	0	0	0
19	MF	(Indonesia) IDN	Rendi Saputra	0	0	0	0	0	0
20	FW	(Indonesia) IDN	Bambang Pamungkas (captain)	2	3	2	3	0	0
21	MF	(Indonesia) IDN	Amarzukih	2	0	2	0	0	0
24	MF	(Indonesia) IDN	Gilbert Dwaramury	0	0	0	0	0	0
26	GK	(Indonesia) IDN	Andritany Ardhiyasa	1	0	1	0	0	0
29	GK	(Indonesia) IDN	Adixi Lenzivio	1	0	1	0	0	0
30	MF	(Nepal) NEP	Rohit Chand	2	0	2	0	0	0
31	GK	(Indonesia) IDN	Reky Rahayu	0	0	0	0	0	0
32	DF	(Indonesia) IDN	Novri Setiawan	0	0	0	0	0	0
33	MF	(Indonesia) IDN	Andro Levandy	0	0	0	0	0	0
35	GK	(Indonesia) IDN	Daryono	0	0	0	0	0	0
52	DF	(Argentina) ARG	Alan Aciar	2	0	2	0	0	0
70	DF	(Indonesia) IDN	Abdul Lestaluhu	0	0	0	0	0	0
77	DF	(Indonesia) IDN	Abduh Lestaluhu	0	0	0	0	0	0
81	FW	(Indonesia) IDN	Muhammad Ilham	2	0	2	0	0	0
83	DF	(Indonesia) IDN	Gunawan Dwi Cahyo	0	0	0	0	0	0
93	MF	(Indonesia) IDN	Adam Alis Setyano	1	0	1	0	0	0
99	FW	(Russia) RUS	Yevgeni Kabayev	1	0	1	0	0	0

=== Clean sheets ===
As of 7 April 2015.

Rnk	Pos	No.	Player	Indonesia Super League	Piala Indonesia	Total
1	GK			0	0	0
Total				0	0	0

=== Disciplinary record ===
As of 7 April 2015.

Rnk	Pos.	No.	Player	ISL			Piala Indonesia			Total		
Rnk	Pos.	No.	Player	Yellow card	(yellow card) (yellow-red card)	Red card	Yellow card	(yellow card) (yellow-red card)	Red card	Yellow card	(yellow card) (yellow-red card)	Red card
1	DF	3	(Indonesia) Vava Mario Yagalo	1	0	0	0	0	0	1	0	0
1	DF	5	(Indonesia) Alfin Tuasalamony	1	0	0	0	0	0	1	0	0
1	DF	6	(Indonesia) Ambrizal	1	0	0	0	0	0	1	0	0
1	DF	52	(Argentina) Alan Aciar	1	0	0	0	0	0	1	0	0
Total				4	0	0	0	0	0	4	0	0

== Transfers ==
=== In ===
No.	Pos.	Name	Moving from	Type	Sources
	MF	(Estonia) Martin Vunk	(Estonia) Nõmme Kalju	Released	
	FW	(Russia) Yevgeni Kabayev	(Estonia) JK Sillamäe Kalev	Released	
	DF	(Indonesia) Alfin Ismail Tuasalamony	Bhayangkara F.C.	Released	
	DF	(Indonesia) Vava Mario Yagalo	Bhayangkara F.C.	Released	
	MF	(Indonesia) Muhammad Ilham	Bhayangkara F.C.	Released	
	FW	(Indonesia) Greg Nwokolo	Bhayangkara F.C.	Released	
	FW	(Indonesia) Bambang Pamungkas	Pelita Bandung Raya	Released	

=== Out ===
No.	Pos.	Name	Moving to	Type	Sources
	FW	(Indonesia) Rachmat Afandi	Mitra Kukar	Released	
	DF	(Indonesia) Syahrizal Syahbuddin	Mitra Kukar	Released	
	MF	(Indonesia) Egi Melgiansyah	Pusamania Borneo	Released	
	DF	(Indonesia) Victor Pae	Pusamania Borneo	Released	
	DF	(Brazil) Fabiano Beltrame	Arema Cronus	Released	
	DF	(Indonesia) Dany Saputra	Bhayangkara F.C.	Released	
	DF	(Indonesia) Ngurah Nanak	Sriwijaya	Released	
	MF	(Indonesia) Defri Rizky	Barito Putera	Released	

== Notes ==
- 1.Persija Jakarta's goals first.
