= Alua =

Alua may refer to:

- Alua Nurmanova (born 2007) Kazakhstani chess player
- Alua Balkibekova (born 1996) Kazakhstani boxer
- Septinus Alua (born 1989) Indonesian footballer
- Alua (lake), a body of water in North Kazakhstan Region, Kazakhstan
- ALUA, Asymmetric Logical Unit Assignment
