= Rezaldi Hehanussa =

Indonesian footballer (born 1995)

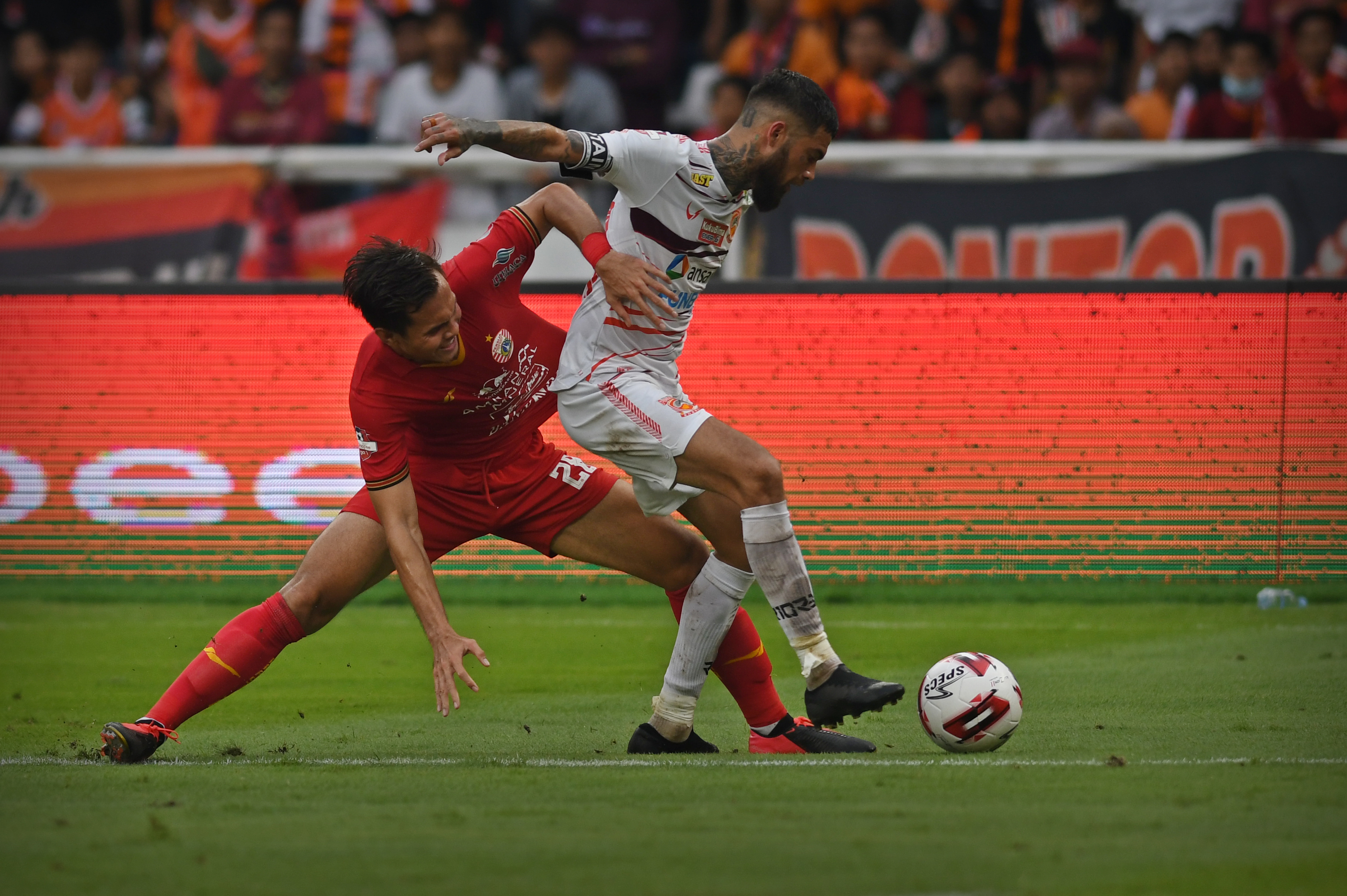
- Hehanussa (left) playing for Persija against Borneo in 2020.

Personal information
- Full name: Muhammad Rezaldi Hehanussa
- Date of birth: 7 November 1995 (age 31)
- Place of birth: Jakarta, Indonesia
- Height: 1.78 m (5 ft 10 in)
- Position: Left back

Team information
- Current team: Semen Padang
- Number: 28

Youth career
- 2005–2006: ASIOP Apacinti
- 2007–2012: Villa 2000
- 2013–2015: Persitangsel South Tangerang

Senior career*
Years	Team	Apps	(Gls)
2016–2023	Persija Jakarta	83	(4)
2023–2026	Persib Bandung	39	(0)
2026	→ Persik Kediri (loan)	7	(0)
2026–	Semen Padang	1	(0)

International career
2017–2018	Indonesia U23	14	(1)
2017–2018	Indonesia	4	(1)
Medal record
Men's football
Representing Indonesia
Southeast Asian Games
Bronze medal – third place	2017 Kuala Lumpur	Team
- * Club domestic league appearances and goals as of 13 September 2026

Muhammad Rezaldi Hehanussa (born 7 November 1995), commonly known as Bule, is an Indonesian professional footballer who plays as a left back for Championship club Semen Padang.

== Club career ==
=== Persija Jakarta ===
Rezaldi joined Persija Jakarta for 2016 Indonesia Soccer Championship A. He made his debut on 29 April 2016, against Persipura at Mandala Stadium.

Rezaldi gave assists for a goal scored by Bruno Lopes in Persija's 1–1 draw over Mitra Kukar on 14 May 2017 and 1–0 win over Bhayangkara on 29 July 2017 in the 2017 Liga 1. On 30 September 2017, Rezaldi scored his first goal for Persija against TIRA-Persikabo in the 41st minute at the Patriot Stadium, Bekasi. On 5 December, Rezaldi renewed his contract with Persija for two years. On 22 December, Rezaldi was named the best young player of the 2017 Liga 1.

On 17 February 2018, Rezaldi was also named the best young player of the 2018 Indonesia President's Cup, he played so well with Persija that he won the tournament, where he created two assists out of three goals in Persija Jakarta's victory over Bali United, his two assists made it easier for Marko Šimić to score. On 28 February, Rezaldi scored his AFC Cup goal for Persija in a 4–1 win against Singapore Premier League club Tampines Rovers. He scored his goal for the club, opening the scoring in a 2–4 away win against the same opponent on 24 April, This result is Persija's first away win in the AFC Cup competition and ensures they qualify for the next round as Group H winners. On 8 June, Rezaldi scored his first goal of the 2018 season, scoring in a 0–5 away win over PS TIRA in the 2018 Liga 1. On 10 July, Rezaldi scored in a 2–2 draw over Sriwijaya, With this draw, Persija is in fourth place with 22 points from 15 matches. Rezaldi give another assists a goal by Marko Šimić in Persija's 0–2 away win over Mitra Kukar on 21 July. On 11 November, the Asian Football Confederation announced via its official Twitter page, that Rezaldi was officially named the best goal of the 2018 AFC Cup after outperforming 10 other goal nominees. On 20 November, he scored the opening goal in a 3–0 home win over Persela Lamongan at Gelora Bung Karno Stadium. Rezaldi had his best performance in the 2018 season where he scored 3 goals and 19 league appearances as he won the 2018 Liga 1 with his club.

In January 2019, Rezaldi has a recurring injury to his right heel, he has to miss the second leg of the Piala Indonesia against 757 Kepri Jaya and is likely to miss Persija's match against Home United in the 2019 AFC Champions League qualifying play-offs. Rezaldi had to be absent for four months, he underwent an injury recovery process. he has even started practicing lightly with his colleagues at the training held on Friday, 10 May. On 16 July, he started his match in the 2019 Liga 1 season for Persija in a 5–3 away lose over TIRA-Persikabo. He made 17 league appearances for Persija in the 2019 season, without scoring, and only played twice in the 2020 season because the league was officially discontinued due to the COVID-19 pandemic.

On 5 September 2021, he started his match in the 2021–22 Liga 1 season for Persija in a 1–1 draw over PSS Sleman. Rezaldi provided his first assist of the 2021–22 Liga 1 season for Marko Šimić's opening goal in Persija Jakarta's 3–2 victory over Madura United on 22 October 2021. On 19 December, Rezaldi suffered a heel injury, Persija's doctor, Donny Kurniawan revealed that Rezaldi had to enter the operating table to recover from the injury, he made 13 appearances with Persija in the 2021–22 season.

In the 2022–23 season with Persija, Rezaldi didn't get enough minutes to play, he only recorded 4 matches with details of 1 starter and 3 from the bench. Persija through its official website announced that Rezaldi officially left Persija. During his 7 years with Persija Jakarta, Rezaldi made 105 appearances and contributed six goals and nine assists in all competitions.

=== Persib Bandung ===
On 26 January 2023, Rezaldi signed a contract with Liga 1 (Indonesia) club Persib Bandung from the rival Persija Jakarta through a fee transfer, he was recruited by Persib on the recommendation of Luis Milla with a two-year contract duration. he, who has been trained by Luis Milla in the Indonesia national team, is projected to occupy the position of Persib's left-back in the second round of the 2022–23 Liga 1. Rezaldi chose 56 as his squad number, 56 is derived from the sum of 28, the number that was identical to him when he was on the field. He said "I have a happy day number with my wife which is 28. In this club, I add that motivation, 28 plus 28 makes 56". On 31 January, he made his league debut by substituted Filipino international Daisuke Sato in the 67th minute, and give assists a goal by David da Silva in Persib's 1–3 away win over PSIS Semarang at Jatidiri Stadium, the latter result saw Persib Bandung move to 1st position in the league table. Rezaldi give another assists a goal by Achmad Jufriyanto from corner kick in Persib's 1–2 home lose over PSM Makassar on 14 February.

== International career ==
In June 2017, Rezaldi was included in the final 22-man squad for a friendly match against Cambodia and Puerto Rico by Luis Milla. He made his international debut for senior team on 8 June 2017, against Cambodia. Rezaldi was part of the Indonesia national under-23 football team that won bronze in the 2017 Southeast Asian Games, scoring in the 3–1 win over Myanmar U23 in the bronze medal match on 29 August 2017. On 4 October 2017, Rezaldi scored his first international goal for Indonesia in a 3–1 win against Cambodia in a friendly match.

== Career statistics ==
=== Club ===
As of 13 September 2026

Club	Season	League		Cup (Note: Includes Piala Indonesia)		Continental (Note: Appearances in AFC Cup)		Other (Note: Appearances in Indonesia President's Cup)		Total	
Club	Season	Apps	Goals	Apps	Goals	Apps	Goals	Apps	Goals	Apps	Goals
Persija Jakarta	2016	9	0	–		–		–		9	0
Persija Jakarta	2017	20	1	–		–		3	0	23	1
Persija Jakarta	2018	19	3	0	0	6	2	6	0	31	5
Persija Jakarta	2019	17	0	2	0	0	0	–		19	0
Persija Jakarta	2020	2	0	0	0	0	0	–		2	0
Persija Jakarta	2021–22	13	0	0	0	0	0	3 (Note: Appearances in Menpora Cup)	0	16	0
Persija Jakarta	2022–23	3	0	0	0	–		2	0	5	0
Persija Jakarta	Total	83	4	2	0	6	2	14	0	105	6
Persib Bandung	2022–23	12	0	–		–		–		12	0
Persib Bandung	2023–24	25	0	0	0	–		0	0	25	0
Persib Bandung	2024–25	1	0	0	0	–		0	0	1	0
Persib Bandung	2025–26	1	0	0	0	1	0	0	0	2	0
Persik Kediri (loan)	2025–26	7	0	0	0	0	0	0	0	7	0
Semen Padang	2026–27	1	0	0	0	0	0	0	0	1	0
Career total		130	4	2	0	7	2	14	0	153	6

=== International ===
As of match played 14 January 2018

Appearances and goals by national team and year
National team	Year	Apps	Goals
Indonesia	2017	3	1
Indonesia	2018	1	0
Total		4	1

=== International under-23 goals ===
#	Date	Venue	Opponent	Score	Result	Competition
1.	29 August 2017	MP Selayang Stadium, Selayang, Malaysia	Myanmar	3–1	3–1	2017 SEA Games

=== International goals ===
#	Date	Venue	Opponent	Score	Result	Competition
1.	4 October 2017	Patriot Stadium, Bekasi, Indonesia	Cambodia	2–0	3–1	Friendly

== Honours ==
=== Club ===
Persija Jakarta

- Liga 1: 2018
- Indonesia President's Cup: 2018
- Menpora Cup: 2021
- Piala Indonesia runner-up: 2018–19

Persib Bandung

- Liga 1: 2023–24, 2024–25

=== International ===
Indonesia U-23

- SEA Games bronze medal: 2017

=== Individual ===
- Liga 1 Best Young Player: 2017
- Liga 1 Best XI: 2017
- Indonesia President's Cup Best Young Player: 2018
- AFC Cup Best Goal: 2018
