= Vava Mario Yagalo =

Indonesian footballer

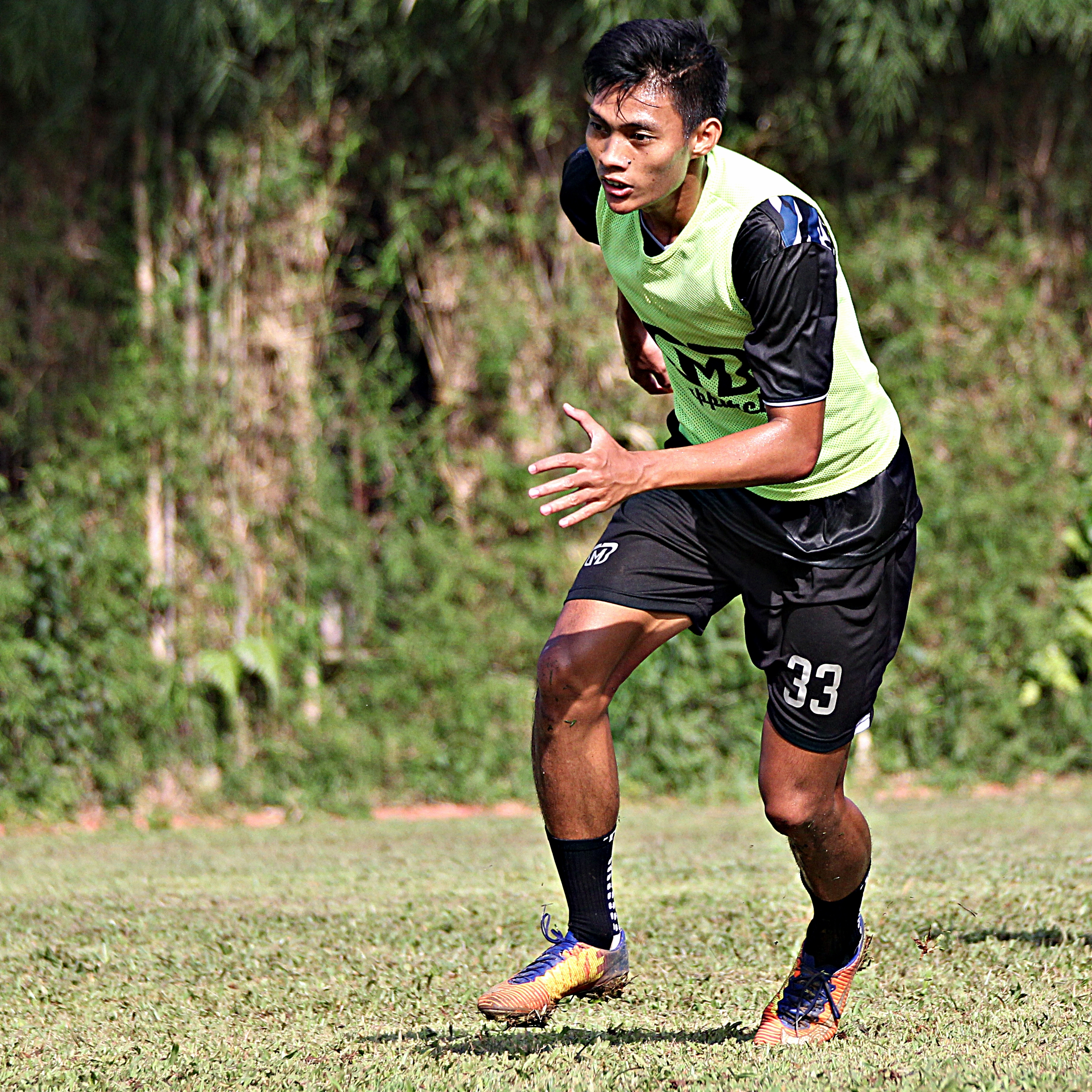
- Vava with TIRA-Persikabo in 2019

Personal information
- Full name: Vava Mario Yagalo
- Date of birth: 21 April 1993 (age 33)
- Place of birth: Kediri, Indonesia
- Height: 1.84 m (6 ft 0 in)
- Position: Defender

Team information
- Current team: Madura United
- Number: 28

Youth career
- 2009–2012: Deportivo Indonesia
- 2012–2013: Sriwijaya

Senior career*
Years	Team	Apps	(Gls)
2013–2014	Bhayangkara	12	(0)
2015–2018	Persija Jakarta	34	(1)
2019	TIRA-Persikabo	22	(0)
2020–2026	Persik Kediri	68	(4)
2026–	Madura United	0	(0)

International career
2008	Indonesia U16	3	(1)
2009–2011	Indonesia U19	7	(0)
2015	Indonesia U23	4	(0)
- * Club domestic league appearances and goals as of 22:30, 23 May 2026 (UTC)

Vava Mario Yagalo (born 21 April 1993) is an Indonesian professional footballer who plays as a defender for Super League club Madura United.

== Club career ==
=== Persija Jakarta ===
On 1 December 2014, Vava signed a year contract with Persija Jakarta. He made his league debut on 4 April 2015 in a 4–4 draw against Arema. In the 2015 season, he only played twice and did not score. He made 13 league appearances for Persija Jakarta in the unofficial tournament 2016 Indonesia Soccer Championship A.

11 matches have been passed by Persija in 2017 Liga 1. He is still unable to compete with other players, he must be willing to be the number five player after Willian Pacheco, Maman Abdurrahman, Ryuji Utomo, and Gunawan Dwi Cahyo. On 8 July 2017, he finally started his match in the 2017 season for Persija, playing as a starter and played the full 90 minutes in a 1–1 draw over Persipura Jayapura. In the 2017 season, Vava helped Persija to fourth place in the final league standings, Vava made 10 appearances in total.

On 6 March 2018, Vava made his first international debut for Persija in a 0–0 draw over 2017 Vietnamese Cup champions Song Lam Nghe An in their third game of the 2018 AFC Cup group stage, playing as a center back with Maman Abdurrahman. In the 2018 Liga 1, he scored his first goal for Persija Jakarta when the game just started 49 seconds on 8 June 2018 in a 0–5 away win over TIRA-Persikabo. Vava was selected as the player who scored the fastest goal in 2018 Liga 1 with a record of 49 seconds.

On 22 January 2019, Persija's Chief operating officer reveals that Vava decided to leave the club, he became the 12th player to leave the club. He made 34 appearances for Persija Jakarta over three years in Liga 1, scoring one goal, as the club won the title for the second time in the Liga Indonesia era.

=== TIRA-Persikabo ===
In 2019, Vava signed for TIRA-Persikabo. He made his debut on 18 May 2019 against Badak Lampung at the Pakansari Stadium, Cibinong. Throughout the 2019 season, he is trusted to appear regularly as a versatile player for 22 appearances.

=== Persik Kediri ===
After a 10-year career outside his hometown, he officially joined and signed a contract with Persik Kediri in February 2020. He made his league debut on 29 February 2020 against Persebaya Surabaya at the Gelora Bung Tomo Stadium, Surabaya. Vava only played 2 times for the club because the league was officially discontinued due to the COVID-19 pandemic.

Vava made his comeback and started his Liga 1 appearance of the season on 27 August 2021, coming on as a starter in a 0–1 lost against Bali United. On 6 November, Vava was pulled off in the 64th minute, replaced by Risna Prahalabenta in a match against Persiraja Banda Aceh, due to an Anterior cruciate ligament injury, and will certainly be absent until the end of the 2021–22 Liga 1.

On 27 August 2022, he made his comeback after anterior cruciate ligament injury for 9 months as an 87th-minute substitute against Bali United. And made his debut as a starter and also scored his first league goal, saved Persik Kediri from defeat in a 1–1 draw over RANS Nusantara on 10 September. He bounced back and became a versatile defender after his injury. Although his original position is centre-back, he can be placed in all positions at the back. When his teammates was absent due to yellow card accumulation, he carried out the duties of a right back, and in the last 3 games, Vava played the role of a reliable left-back. Vava was twice present as a savior and also the inspirer of Persik Kediri's victory.

He continued his good form with the opening goal in a 2–0 victory over Persikabo 1973 on 7 April 2023 at the Brawijaya Stadium. On 11 April, Vava extended his contract with the club for one season.

== International career ==
Vava represented Indonesia at the 2008 AFC U-16 Championship. He scored his first goal against Syria on 4 October 2008.

== Personal life ==
Vava was named after two Brazilian football legends, Vavá and Mário Zagallo, despite being a devout Muslim. He studied law at the University of Kediri.

Vava's father died on 29 June 2016. He received the news when he was training with Persija.

== Career statistics ==
=== Club ===
As of match played 23 May 2026

Club	Season	League			Cup (Note: Includes Piala Indonesia)		Continental (Note: Appearances in AFC Cup)		Other (Note: Appearances in Indonesia President's Cup)		Total	
Club	Season	Division	Apps	Goals	Apps	Goals	Apps	Goals	Apps	Goals	Apps	Goals
Bhayangkara	2014	Indonesia Super League	12	0	0	0	–		0	0	12	0
Persija Jakarta	2015	Indonesia Super League	2	0	0	0	–		2	0	4	0
Persija Jakarta	2016	ISC A	13	0	0	0	–		0	0	13	0
Persija Jakarta	2017	Liga 1	10	0	0	0	–		2	0	12	0
Persija Jakarta	2018	Liga 1	9	1	0	0	2	0	1	0	12	1
Persija Jakarta	Total		34	1	0	0	2	0	5	0	41	1
TIRA-Persikabo	2019	Liga 1	22	0	2	0	–		3	0	27	0
Persik Kediri	2020	Liga 1	2	0	0	0	–		0	0	2	0
Persik Kediri	2021–22	Liga 1	8	0	0	0	–		2 (Note: Appearances in Menpora Cup)	0	10	0
Persik Kediri	2022–23	Liga 1	20	2	0	0	–		0	0	20	2
Persik Kediri	2023–24	Liga 1	12	0	0	0	–		0	0	12	0
Persik Kediri	2024–25	Liga 1	17	2	0	0	–		0	0	17	2
Persik Kediri	2025–26	Super League	9	0	0	0	–		0	0	9	0
Career total			136	5	2	0	2	0	10	0	150	5

== Honours ==
=== Club ===
Sriwijaya U-21

- Indonesia Super League U-21: 2012–13

Persija Jakarta

- Liga 1: 2018
- Indonesia President's Cup: 2018
