= Nugroho Fatchur Rochman =

Indonesian association footballer

Personal information
- Full name: Nugroho Fatchur Rochman
- Date of birth: 8 September 1996 (age 30)
- Place of birth: Surabaya, Indonesia
- Height: 1.72 m (5 ft 8 in)
- Position: Midfielder

Team information
- Current team: Donggala United
- Number: 8

Youth career
- 2016: Bhayangkara

Senior career*
Years	Team	Apps	(Gls)
2017	Persibo Bojonegoro	0	(0)
2018–2019	Persija Jakarta	4	(0)
2019	PSIM Yogyakarta	8	(0)
2020	Putra Sinar Giri	0	(0)
2021–2022	PSG Pati	9	(1)
2021	→ Persiba Balikpapan (loan)	4	(0)
2022	Persiba Balikpapan	5	(0)
2023	Deltras	3	(0)
2023–2024	Persikab Bandung	8	(0)
2024–2025	Persikabo 1973	8	(0)
2025–2026	Sriwijaya	13	(1)
2026–	Donggala United	0	(0)
- * Club domestic league appearances and goals as of 22:30, 29 January 2026 (UTC)

Nugroho Fatchur Rochman (born 8 September 1996) is an Indonesian professional footballer who plays as a midfielder for Liga Nusantara club Donggala United.

== Club career ==
=== PSG Pati ===
In 2021, Nugroho signed a contract with Indonesian Liga 2 club PSG Pati. He made first 2021–22 Liga 2 debut on 26 September 2021, coming on as a starting player in a 2–0 loss with Persis Solo at the Manahan Stadium, Surakarta.

==== Persiba Balikpapan (loan) ====
He was signed for Persiba Balikpapan to play in the second round of Liga 2, on loan from PSG Pati. Nugroho made his debut on 15 December 2021 in a match against Sriwijaya at the Pakansari Stadium, Cibinong.

== Honours ==
=== Club ===
Persija Jakarta

- Liga 1: 2018
- Indonesia President's Cup: 2018
