= Rizky Darmawan =

Indonesian footballer

Personal information
- Full name: Muhammad Rizky Darmawan
- Date of birth: 5 February 1994 (age 32)
- Place of birth: Tangerang, Indonesia
- Height: 1.78 m (5 ft 10 in)
- Position: Goalkeeper

Team information
- Current team: PSIS Semarang
- Number: 52

Youth career
- –2013: Persija Jakarta

Senior career*
Years	Team	Apps	(Gls)
2013–2014	Persitara Jakarta Utara		
2014–2015	Villa 2000	5	(0)
2015–2019	Persija Jakarta	3	(0)
2018	→ Persita Tangerang (loan)	0	(0)
2019–2020	Mitra Kukar	11	(0)
2020–2021	Sulut United	0	(0)
2021	Sriwijaya	12	(0)
2022	PSS Sleman	1	(0)
2022	Serpong City	4	(0)
2022–2023	Persita Tangerang	3	(0)
2023–	PSIS Semarang	39	(0)
- * Club domestic league appearances and goals as of 9 October 2026

Muhammad Rizky Darmawan (born 5 February 1994) is an Indonesian professional footballer who plays as a goalkeeper for Championship club PSIS Semarang.

== Career statistics ==
As of 9 October 2026

Appearances and goals by club, season and competition
Club	Season	League			Cup (Note: Includes Piala Indonesia.)		Continental (Note: Appearances in AFC Cup.)		Total	
Club	Season	Division	Apps	Goals	Apps	Goals	Apps	Goals	Apps	Goals
Villa 2000	2014	Premier Division	5	0	–		–		5	0
Persija Jakarta
Persija Jakarta	2016	ISC A	2	0	–		–		2	0
Persija Jakarta	2017	Liga 1	1	0	–		–		1	0
Persija Jakarta	2018	Liga 1	0	0	0	0	2	0	2	0
Persija Jakarta	Total		3	0	0	0	2	0	5	0
Persita Tangerang (loan)	2018	Liga 2	0	0	–		–		0	0
Mitra Kukar	2019	Liga 2	11	0	–		–		11	0
Sulut United	2020	Liga 2	0	0	–		–		0	0
Sriwijaya	2021	Liga 2	12	0	–		–		12	0
PSS Sleman	2021–22	Liga 1	1	0	–		–		1	0
Serpong City	2022–23	Liga 3	4	0	–		–		4	0
Persita Tangerang	2022–23	Liga 1	3	0	–		–		3	0
PSIS Semarang	2023–24	Liga 1	13	0	–		–		13	0
PSIS Semarang	2024–25	Liga 1	4	0	–		–		4	0
PSIS Semarang	2025–26	Championship	18	0	–		–		18	0
PSIS Semarang	2026–27	Championship	4	0	0	0	–		4	0
Career Total			74	0	0	0	2	0	76	0

== Honours ==
Persija Jakarta

- Liga 1: 2018
- Indonesia President's Cup: 2018

Serpong City

- Liga 3: 2022
