= Daryono =

Indonesian footballer (1994–2020)

Personal information
- Date of birth: 5 March 1994
- Place of birth: Semarang, Indonesia
- Date of death: 9 November 2020 (aged 26)
- Place of death: Jakarta, Indonesia
- Height: 1.78 m (5 ft 10 in)
- Position: Goalkeeper

Youth career
- –2011: Diklat Salatiga
- 2011–2013: Persija Jakarta

Senior career*
Years	Team	Apps	(Gls)
2013–2018	Persija Jakarta	13	(0)
2019–2020	Badak Lampung	21	(0)
Total		34	(0)
- * Club domestic league appearances and goals

Daryono (5 March 1994 – 9 November 2020) was an Indonesian professional footballer who played as a goalkeeper.

On 9 November 2020, Daryono died due to dengue fever.

== Career statistics ==
Appearances and goals by club, season and competition
Club	Season	League			Cup (Note: Includes Piala Indonesia.)		Continental (Note: Appearances in AFC Cup.)		Total	
Club	Season	Division	Apps	Goals	Apps	Goals	Apps	Goals	Apps	Goals
Persija Jakarta	2013	ISL	1	0	–		–		1	0
Persija Jakarta	2014	ISL	0	0	–		–		0	0
Persija Jakarta	2015	ISL	0	0	–		–		0	0
Persija Jakarta	2016	ISC A	6	0	–		–		6	0
Persija Jakarta	2017	Liga 1	1	0	–		–		1	0
Persija Jakarta	2018	Liga 1	5	0	2	0	0	0	7	0
Persija Jakarta	Total		13	0	2	0	0	0	15	0
Badak Lampung	2019	Liga 1	20	0	–		–		20	0
Badak Lampung	2020	Liga 2	1	0	–		–		1	0
Badak Lampung	Total		21	0	0	0	0	0	21	0
Career total			34	0	2	0	0	0	36	0

== Honours ==
Persija Jakarta

- Liga 1: 2018
- Indonesia President's Cup: 2018
