= Valentino Telaubun =

Indonesian footballer

Personal information
- Full name: Bernardus Valentino Telaubun
- Date of birth: 21 November 1984 (age 41)
- Place of birth: Kai Besar, Indonesia
- Height: 1.82 m (6 ft 0 in)
- Positions: Left-back; centre-back

Team information
- Current team: Persipani Paniai

Senior career*
| Years | Team | Apps | (Gls) |
| 2005–2007 | Persemalra Maluku Tenggara | 50 | (0) |
| 2007–2008 | Persiba Bantul | 16 | (1) |
| 2008–2009 | PSIS Semarang | 17 | (2) |
| 2009–2010 | PSIR Rembang | 7 | (0) |
| 2010–2011 | Persela Lamongan | 17 | (0) |
| 2011–2012 | Bontang | 22 | (2) |
| 2012–2013 | Perseman Manokwari | 23 | (3) |
| 2013–2014 | Semen Padang | 10 | (0) |
| 2014–2015 | Persita Tangerang | 20 | (1) |
| 2015 | Persiba Balikpapan | 1 | (0) |
| 2016 | PSM Makassar | 8 | (0) |
| 2016 | Bhayangkara | 2 | (0) |
| 2017 | Barito Putera | 21 | (1) |
| 2018 | Persija Jakarta | 5 | (0) |
| 2018–2021 | Persipura Jayapura | 35 | (0) |
| 2021 | Sriwijaya | 12 | (1) |
| 2022 | Persela Lamongan | 10 | (1) |
| 2022 | Bekasi City | 5 | (0) |
| 2023 | Persiba Balikpapan | 4 | (0) |
| 2023–2024 | Persipura Jayapura | 7 | (0) |
| 2024–2025 | Dejan | 1 | (0) |
| 2025–2026 | Sriwijaya | 9 | (0) |
| 2026– | Persipani Paniai | 0 | (0) |

International career
| 2012 | Indonesia | 2 | (0) |
- * Club domestic league appearances and goals as of 16 January 2026 (UTC)

Bernardus Valentino Telaubun (born 21 November 1984) is an Indonesian professional footballer who plays as a defender for Liga Nusantara club Persipani Paniai.

He made two appearances for the Indonesia national team at the 2012 AFF Championship.

== Club career ==
=== Semen Padang ===
On 3 November 2014, he was released by Semen Padang.

=== Persija Jakarta ===
On 30 November 2017, he signed a two-year contract with Persija Jakarta.

== Career statistics ==
=== International ===
As of match played 11 June 2012

Appearances and goals by national team and year
| National team | Year | Apps | Goals |
|---|---|---|---|
| Indonesia | 2012 | 2 | 0 |
| Total | | 2 | 0 |

== Honours ==
=== Club ===
Persija Jakarta

- Indonesia President's Cup: 2018
