= Addison Alves =

Brazilian footballer (born 1981)

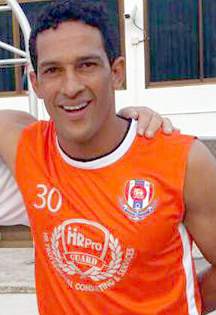

Personal information
- Full name: Addison Alves de Oliveira
- Date of birth: 20 March 1981 (age 45)
- Place of birth: Brasília, DF, Brazil
- Height: 1.77 m (5 ft 9 1/2 in)
- Position: Striker

Senior career*
Years	Team	Apps	(Gls)
2000	Santa Maria		
2001	Guará		
2001–2002	Onzonilla		
2002–2003	Huracán Z		
2004–2005	Atlético Bembibre	54	(35)
2006–2008	Cultural Leonesa	68	(18)
2008–2009	Hércules	0	(0)
2008–2009	→ Cartagena (loan)	36	(9)
2009–2011	Puertollano	59	(16)
2011–2012	Burgos	12	(3)
2012–2013	Coruxo	11	(0)
2013	PSIS Semarang	15	(9)
2014	Persela Lamongan	23	(9)
2015	Osotspa Samut Prakan	27	(12)
2016	Siam Navy	20	(3)
2017	Persipura Jayapura	30	(15)
2018	Persija Jakarta	11	(1)
2018	Persipura Jayapura	16	(5)
2019	La Virgen del Camino	7	(1)

Managerial career
- 2020–: Bali United (Assistant)
- * Club domestic league appearances and goals

Addison Alves de Oliveira (born 20 March 1981) is a Brazilian former footballer who played as a striker and is the current assistant manager of Bali United.

== Career statistics ==
=== Club ===
Appearances and goals by club, season and competition
Club	Season	League			Cup (Note: Includes Copa del Rey and Piala Indonesia.)		Continental (Note: Appearances in AFC Cup.)		Total	
Club	Season	Division	Apps	Goals	Apps	Goals	Apps	Goals	Apps	Goals
Puertollano	2010-2011	Segunda División B	32	7	–		–		32	7
Burgos	2011-2012	Segunda División B	12	3	1	0	–		13	3
Coruxo	2012-2013	Segunda División B	11	0	–		–		11	0
PSIS Semarang	2013	Divisi Utama	15	9	–		–		15	9
Persela Lamongan	2014	ISL	23	9	–		–		23	9
Osotspa Samut Prakan	2015	TPL	27	12	–		–		27	12
Siam Navy	2016	T1	20	3	–		–		20	3
Persipura Jayapura	2017	Liga 1	30	15	–		–		30	15
Persija Jakarta	2018	Liga 1	8	1	0	0	8	2	16	3
Career Total			178	59	1	0	8	2	187	61
