= Milan Petrović (football coach) =

Slovenian football manager (born 1961)

Personal information
- Date of birth: 26 August 1961 (age 65)

Managerial career
- Years: Team
- Factor
- 2009: Zagorje
- 2010–2011: Primorje
- 2015–2016: Olimpija Ljubljana
- 2016: Rudar Škale
- 2018: Arema
- 2019–2020: Badak Lampung
- 2021: Rudar Velenje

Milan Petrović (born 26 August 1961) is a Slovenian football manager who most recently managed Rudar Velenje.

== Career ==
Between 2010 and 2011, Petrović was the manager of Slovenian PrvaLiga club Primorje. After that, he coached Olimpija Ljubljana, Rudar Škale, and Arema. In 2019, he was appointed head coach of Badak Lampung in the Indonesian Liga 1, a position he held until 2020.
