= Asri Akbar =

Indonesian association footballer

Personal information
- Full name: Asri Akbar
- Date of birth: 29 January 1984 (age 42)
- Place of birth: Gowa, Indonesia
- Height: 1.69 m (5 ft 7 in)
- Position: Central midfielder

Senior career*
Years	Team	Apps	(Gls)
2003−2006	Persim Maros		(3)
2006−2008	Semen Padang	28	(0)
2008−2009	PSMS Medan	14	(1)
2009−2010	PSM Makassar	25	(1)
2010−2012	Persiba Balikpapan	57	(6)
2012−2013	Persib Bandung	28	(1)
2014−2015	Sriwijaya	20	(4)
2015–2016	Mitra Kukar	29	(2)
2016–2017	Borneo	20	(1)
2017−2018	Persija Jakarta	21	(0)
2019	Borneo	10	(1)
2019	Persita Tangerang	13	(0)
2020	Persijap Jepara	1	(1)
2021	RANS Cilegon	8	(0)
2022	Persekat Tegal	7	(0)
2023–2024	Kartanegara	4	(0)
- * Club domestic league appearances and goals as of 1 October 2022 (UTC)

Asri Akbar (born 29 January 1984) is an Indonesian former footballer who last played as a central midfielder for Liga 4 club Kartanegara.

== Club career ==
On August 26, 2012, he signed with Persib Bandung. On October 26, 2013, he moved to Sriwijaya FC. Despite interest from other teams, he extended his contract and will play for Sriwijaya FC in the 2015 Indonesia Super League.

== Honours ==
Borneo

- Indonesia President's Cup runner-up: 2017

Persija Jakarta

- Liga 1: 2018
- Indonesia President's Cup: 2018

Persita Tangerang

- Liga 2 runner-up: 2019

RANS Cilegon

- Liga 2 runner-up: 2021
