= Septinus Alua =

Indonesian association footballer

Personal information
- Full name: Septinus Alua
- Date of birth: 26 September 1989 (age 37)
- Place of birth: Wamena, Indonesia
- Height: 1.58 m (5 ft 2 in)
- Position: Defensive midfielder

Youth career
- 2009: Bintang Jaya Asahan
- 2010: Persitoli Tolikara

Senior career*
Years	Team	Apps	(Gls)
2011–2014	Persiwa Wamena	26	(0)
2015–2017	Perseru Serui	46	(0)
2018	Persija Jakarta	3	(0)
2019	PSIS Semarang	3	(0)
2019–2024	Persiba Balikpapan	14	(1)
- * Club domestic league appearances and goals as of 13 December 2023

Septinus Alua (born 26 September 1989) is an Indonesian professional footballer who plays as a defensive midfielder.

== Career ==
=== Perseru Serui ===
In 2016, Septinus joined in the squad of Perseru Serui for 2016 Indonesia Soccer Championship A. Septinus made his debut against Persegres Gresik United in the second week. A few minutes before the game ended. Septinus suddenly experiencing pain in his leg after a clash with Persegres Players. When the medical team arrived with a stretcher, Septinus stalling a match time, Finally, Septinus stretchered out of the field. However, he still feels aggrieved, he still protested when he was on a stretcher. Because too many moves, finally, He fell to the ground, and he experienced pain.

=== Persija Jakarta ===
On November 27, 2017, he signed a two-year contract with Liga 1 club Persija Jakarta. Alua made his league debut on 12 September 2018 in a match against Borneo at the Segiri Stadium, Samarinda.

=== PSIS Semarang ===
He was signed for PSIS Semarang to play in the Liga 1 in the 2019 season. Alua made his league debut on 30 May 2019 in a match against Persebaya Surabaya at the Gelora Bung Tomo Stadium, Surabaya.

=== Persiba Balikpapan ===
In 2019, Septinus Alua signed a one-year contract with Indonesian Liga 2 club Persiba Balikpapan.

== Honours ==
=== Club ===
Persija Jakarta

- Liga 1: 2018
- Indonesia President's Cup: 2018
