= Jaime Xavier =

Brazilian footballer

Jaimerson
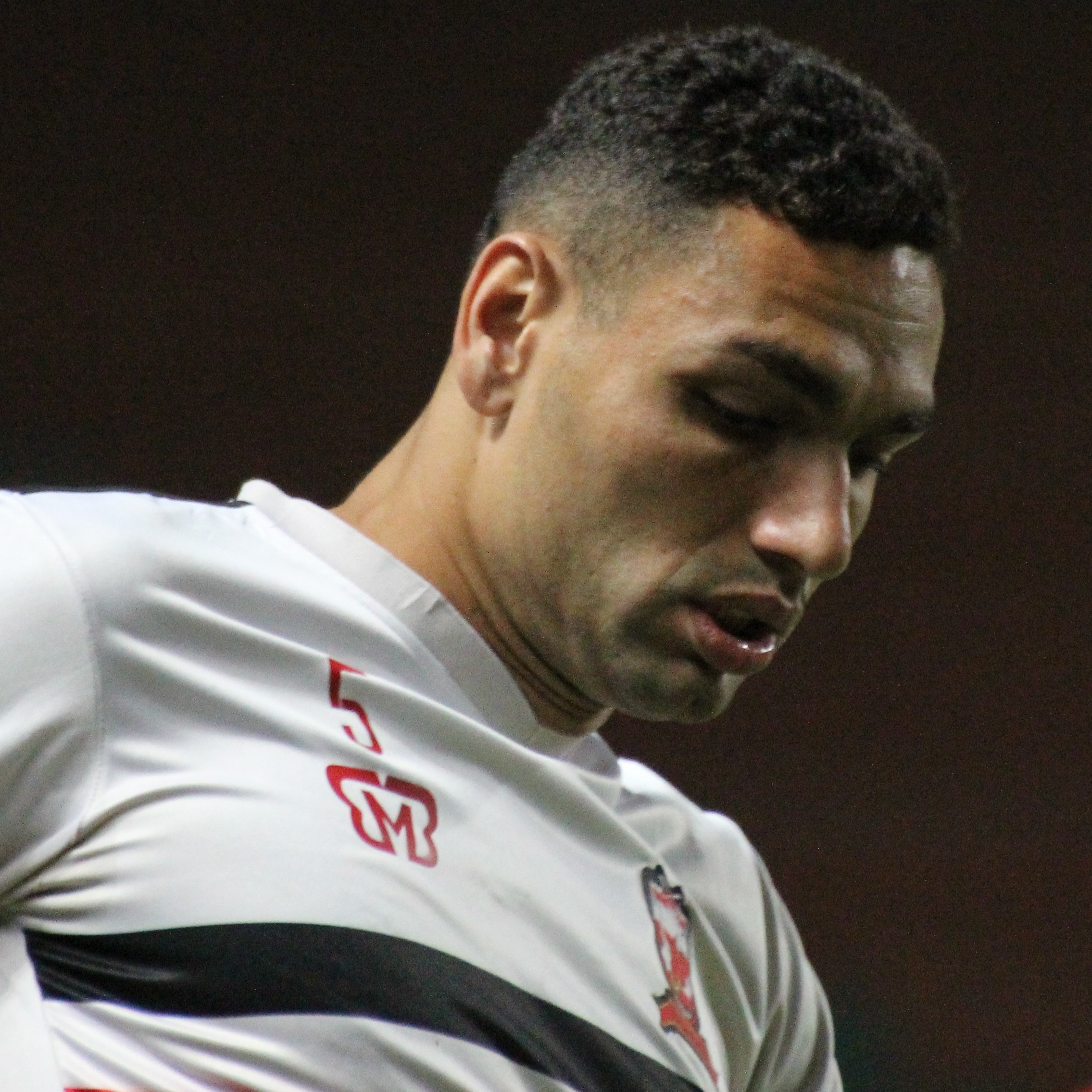
- Jaimerson with Madura United in 2019.

Personal information
- Full name: Jaimerson da Silva Xavier
- Date of birth: 26 February 1990 (age 36)
- Place of birth: Guarulhos, Brazil
- Height: 1.83 m (6 ft 0 in)
- Position: Centre-back

Senior career*
Years	Team	Apps	(Gls)
2009–2011	Portuguesa	7	(0)
2011–2012	Rio Verde	20	(2)
2012–2013	Grêmio Anápolis	15	(2)
2013–2014	Nacional da Madeira	8	(0)
2014–2015	Nacional–SP	16	(4)
2015–2016	Figueirense	4	(0)
2016	→ Joinville (loan)	2	(0)
2016–2017	Santa Cruz	12	(0)
2017–2018	Persija Jakarta	30	(7)
2019–2022	Madura United	60	(4)
2022–2024	Persis Solo	54	(2)
2024	PSBS Biak	10	(0)
2025	Bali United	12	(0)
2026	Persiku Kudus	11	(0)
- * Club domestic league appearances and goals as of 3 May 2026

Jaimerson da Silva Xavier (born 26 February 1990), simply known as Jaime Xavier or Jaime, is a Brazilian professional footballer. He has previously played for Bali United and Persiku Kudus.

== Career ==
Jaime began his career with Portuguesa, appearing at various youth levels before being promoted into the first-team. He made his debut for the club in the 2010 Campeonato Brasileiro Série D versus Campinense.

In 2016, Jaime completed a permanent move to Figueirense.

== Career statistics ==
As of 3 May 2026

Appearances and goals by club, season and competition
Club	Season	League			National Cup (Note: Includes the Copa do Brasil.)		Continental		Other (Note: Includes the Campeonato Catarinense, Campeonato Gaúcho and Primeira Liga.)		Total	
Club	Season	Division	Apps	Goals	Apps	Goals	Apps	Goals	Apps	Goals	Apps	Goals
Portuguesa	2009	Série B	1	0	0	0	—		0	0	1	0
Portuguesa	2010	Série B	2	0	0	0	—		3 (Note: Appearances in the 2010 Campeonato Paulista)	0	5	0
Portuguesa	2011	Série B	4	0	1	0	—		6 (Note: Appearances in the 2011 Campeonato Paulista)	0	11	0
Portuguesa	Total		7	0	1	0	—		10	0	18	0
Rio Verde	2012	Goiano	20	2	0	0	—		9 (Note: Appearances in the 2012 Campeonato Goiano)	0	9	0
Grêmio Anápolis	2013	Goiano	15	2	0	0	—		8 (Note: Appearances in the 2013 Campeonato Goiano)	0	8	0
Nacional da Madeira	2013–14	Primeira Liga	8	0	0	0	—		0	0	0	0
Nacional–SP	2015	Paulista Série B	16	4	0	0	—		24 (Note: Eleven appearances in the Campeonato Paulista Série B, thirteen appearances in the Copa Paulista)	2 (Note: One goal in the Campeonato Paulista Série B, one goal in the Copa Paulista)	24	2
Figueirense	2016	Série A	4	0	2 (Note: Two appearances in the 2016 Copa do Brasil)	0	0	0	6 (Note: Five appearances in the 2016 Campeonato Catarinense, one appearance in 2016 Primeira Liga)	0	12	0
Joinville	2016	Série B	2	0	0	0	—		0	0	2	0
Persija Jakarta	2017—2018	Liga 1	30	7	0	0	6	0	0	0	36	7
Madura United	2019	Liga 1	28	2	6 (Note: Appearances in the 2018–19 Piala Indonesia)	1 (Note: One goal in the 2018–19 Piala Indonesia)	–		6 (Note: Appearances in the 2019 Indonesia President's Cup)	0	40	3
Madura United	2020	Liga 1	3	1	0	0	–		0	0	3	1
Madura United	2021–22	Liga 1	29	1	0	0	–		4 (Note: Appearances in the 2021 Menpora Cup)	1 (Note: one goal in the 2021 Menpora Cup)	33	2
Persis Solo	2022–23	Liga 1	26	2	0	0	–		0	0	26	2
Persis Solo	2023–24	Liga 1	28	0	0	0	–		0	0	28	0
PSBS Biak	2024–25	Liga 1	10	0	0	0	–		0	0	10	0
Bali United	2024–25	Liga 1	12	0	0	0	–		0	0	12	0
Persiku Kudus	2025–26	Championship	11	0	0	0	–		0	0	11	0
Career total			250	21	9	1	6	0	66	3	328	25

== Honours ==
=== Club honors ===
Persija Jakarta

- Liga 1: 2018
- Indonesia President's Cup: 2018
