= Maman Abdurahman (footballer) =

Indonesian professional footballer

Personal information
- Full name: Maman Abdurahman
- Date of birth: 12 May 1982 (age 44)
- Place of birth: Jakarta, Indonesia
- Height: 1.74 m (5 ft 9 in)
- Position: Defender

Youth career
- 1996–1998: PS PAM Jaya
- 1998–2000: Persijatim

Senior career*
Years	Team	Apps	(Gls)
2001–2005	Persijatim Solo	23	(3)
2005–2008	PSIS Semarang	54	(4)
2008–2013	Persib Bandung	121	(4)
2013–2014	Sriwijaya	11	(0)
2014–2015	Persita Tangerang	35	(3)
2016–2024	Persija Jakarta	147	(2)
2024–2025	PSPS Pekanbaru	12	(0)
Total		403	(16)

International career
2003–2005	Indonesia U23		
2004–2010	Indonesia	29	(0)
Medal record
Men's football
Representing Indonesia
AFF Championship
Runner-up	2010 Indonesia & Vietnam	Team
- * Club domestic league appearances and goals

Maman Abdurahman (born 12 May 1982 in Jakarta, Indonesia) is an Indonesian former professional footballer who plays as a defender.

== Club career ==
=== Youth career ===
He made his debut at PS PAM Jaya in the 1996–1998 season. Afterwards he played for Persijatim in the 1998–2000 season.

=== Senior career ===
He started his senior career in 2001 at Persijatim Solo, playing for three seasons (2001–2004) where he appear 13 times and scored 3 goals. In 2005, he signed for PSIS Semarang, playing for three seasons (2005–2008) as well. Scoring one goal in 34 appearances.

In 2008, he was signed by Persib Bandung and became the first squad.

In 2013, he signed a contract with Sriwijaya for short-time period. And in 2014, he was signed by Persita Tangerang to compete in Indonesian Premier League.

Finally in 2016, he was signed by Persija Jakarta to compete in unofficial national cup. As Liga 1 began, he became an important player of Persija.

He and his son Rafa Abdurrahman wrote history in Indonesian football as the first father and son to play together in a professional match in the last game of 2023/24 Liga 1 season against PSIS Semarang.

== International career ==
Abdurrahman's international debut in the senior national team was at 2006 Brunei Merdeka Games against Malaysia on 23 August 2006; Indonesia drew 1–1. At Asian Cup 2007 he played 3 times; Indonesia win 2–1 from Bahrain, lose 1–2 from Saudi Arabia and lose 0–1 from South Korea at last game in group D. He was Indonesia captain for the match against Thailand in 2010 AFF Suzuki Cup.

=== National team career ===
- 2003: Pre Olympic
- 2004: Asian Cup, Pre World Cup
- 2005: SEA Games XXIII Philippines
- 2006: Brunei Merdeka Games, BV International Cup
- 2007: AFF Championship, Asian Cup

== Honours ==
PSIS Semarang

- Liga Indonesia Premier Division runner up: 2006

Persija Jakarta

- Liga 1: 2018
- Indonesia President's Cup: 2018
- Menpora Cup: 2021
- Piala Indonesia runner-up: 2018–19

Indonesia

- AFF Championship runner-up: 2010

Individual

- Liga Indonesia Premier Division Best Player: 2006
