= Marcel Sacramento =

Brazilian footballer

Personal information
- Full name: Marcel Silva Sacramento
- Date of birth: 24 August 1987 (age 39)
- Place of birth: Vera Cruz, Brazil
- Height: 1.83 m (6 ft 0 in)
- Position: Forward

Senior career*
Years	Team	Apps	(Gls)
2005–2006	Bahia	4	(0)
2005	→ Albirex Niigata (loan)	0	(0)
2007	Ceará	16	(7)
2008–2011	Kalmar FF	31	(6)
2009	→ Jönköpings IF (loan)	20	(4)
2012–2013	América	25	(8)
2013–2014	Guarany Sobral	20	(15)
2014–2015	Jacuipense	32	(8)
2015–2016	Globo	15	(5)
2016	Jacuipense	5	(0)
2016–2017	Semen Padang	38	(22)
2018	Persipura Jayapura	16	(7)
2018	Barito Putera	14	(5)
2019	Erbil SC	0	(0)
2019	TRAU	3	(0)
2020	Jacuipense	6	(0)
2020–2021	Real Noroeste	9	(4)
2021	Afogados	2	(0)
- * Club domestic league appearances and goals

Marcel Silva Sacramento (born 24 August 1987) is a Brazilian former professional footballer who played as a forward.

== Early life ==
Sacramento began his career with the juvenile team of Bahia, where as a striker he was top scorer of the juniors. He played for Avine Cardoso Júnior and Bruno César among others.

== Career ==
When he was promoted to professional staff of Bahia, he was loaned to Albirex Niigata, Japan. Sacramento returned to Brazil to act again in Bahia, now as a starter. From Bahia he moved was to Ceará, where he stood out and was loaned to Boavista and then sold to Jönköping Södra of Sweden.
