= Ivan Carlos (footballer) =

Brazilian footballer (born 1989)

Personal information
- Full name: Ivan Carlos França Coelho
- Date of birth: 6 December 1989 (age 36)
- Place of birth: Brazil
- Height: 1.85 m (6 ft 1 in)
- Position: Striker

Team information
- Current team: Club Eagles
- Number: 29

Senior career*
Years	Team	Apps	(Gls)
2015–2016	SHB Vientiane FC	17	(7)
2016–2017	Persela Lamongan	27	(14)
2017–2018	Persija Jakarta	3	(1)
2018–2019	Alki Oroklini	27	(10)
2019	AEL Limassol	11	(3)
2020	Pahang FA	9	(6)
2021-22	Persela Lamongan	28	(12)
2023–	Club Eagles	1	(0)
- * Club domestic league appearances and goals as of 17 May 2024 @ 15:53(AEST)

Ivan Carlos França Coelho (born 6 December 1989) is a Brazilian professional footballer who plays as a striker for Maldivian Club Club Eagles.

== Career ==
He made his debut in the Liga 1 on 17 April 2017, where he scored one goal.
