= PTIK Stadium =

Football stadium in Indonesia

- Location in Jakarta
- Address: Jalan Tirtayasa Raya No. 6, Melawai, South Jakarta, Jakarta; Indonesia
- Location: Kebayoran Baru, South Jakarta, Jakarta
- Coordinates: 6.244878°S 106.806761°E
- Owner: Indonesian National Police
- Operator: Indonesian National Police
- Capacity: 3,000
- Surface: Grass field

Tenants
- PSJS; Bhayangkara; Maluku Utara United (2023–)

PTIK Stadium is a football stadium in the City of South Jakarta, Indonesia. The stadium has a capacity of 3,000 people.

The stadium is owned by the Indonesian National Police. It is located in the center of POLRI Institute for Higher Learning (PTIK) and is the home base of PSJS Jakarta Selatan and Bhayangkara Football Club.
