= Fabiano Beltrame =

Brazilian footballer (born 1982)

Personal information
- Full name: Fabiano Da Rosa Beltrame
- Date of birth: 29 August 1982 (age 44)
- Place of birth: Foz do Iguaçu, Brazil
- Height: 1.84 m (6 ft 0 in)
- Position: Centre-back

Team information
- Current team: PSIS Semarang
- Number: 15

Senior career*
Years	Team	Apps	(Gls)
2001–2005	São José	62	(5)
2005–2006	Persela Lamongan	30	(3)
2007	Persmin Minahasa	26	(2)
2008–2011	Persela Lamongan	90	(6)
2011–2014	Persija Jakarta	78	(10)
2014–2015	Arema Cronus	22	(6)
2016–2018	Madura United	94	(15)
2019–2021	Persib Bandung	1	(0)
2021	PSS Sleman	0	(0)
2021–2023	Persis Solo	31	(2)
2022	→ Arema (loan)	9	(0)
2023–2025	PSBS Biak	40	(1)
2025–2026	Barito Putera	23	(4)
2026–	PSIS Semarang	6	(0)
- * Club domestic league appearances and goals as of 1 November 2026

Fabiano Da Rosa Beltrame (born 29 August 1982) is a Brazilian professional footballer who plays as a centre-back for Championship club PSIS Semarang.

== Personal life ==
Born in Brazil, he obtained Indonesian citizenship through naturalization.

== Honours ==
=== Club ===
Persela Lamongan

- East Java Governor Cup: 2009, 2010

Arema Cronus

- Indonesian Inter Island Cup: 2014–15

PSS Sleman

- Menpora Cup third place: 2021

Persis Solo

- Liga 2: 2021

PSBS Biak

- Liga 2: 2023–24

=== Individual ===
- Liga 2 Best XI: 2021
