= 2018 Liga 1 (Indonesia) =

Liga 1
- Season: 2018
- Dates: 23 March – 9 December 2018
- Champions: Persija; 1st Liga 1 title 11th Indonesian title
- Relegated: Mitra Kukar; Sriwijaya; PSMS
- AFC Champions League: Persija
- AFC Cup: PSM
- Matches: 306
- Goals: 872 (2.85 per match)
- Best player: Rohit Chand
- Top goalscorer: Aleksandar Rakić (21 goals)
- Biggest home win: Persipura 6–0 Madura United (19 May 2018)
- Biggest away win: PS TIRA 0–5 Persija (8 June 2018)
- Highest scoring: PSM 4–3 PS TIRA (21 April 2018); Bali United 3–4 Sriwijaya (5 May 2018); Mitra Kukar 3–4 Barito Putera (6 July 2018); PS TIRA 3–4 Borneo (20 July 2018); Persebaya 3–4 Persib (26 July 2018); Mitra Kukar 4–3 Arema (27 July 2018); Bali United 2–5 Persebaya (18 November 2018)
- Longest winning run: 6 matches PSM
- Longest unbeaten run: 10 matches PSM
- Longest winless run: 8 matches Barito Putera
- Longest losing run: 5 matches Bali United; PSMS
- Highest attendance: 68,873; Persija 2–1 Mitra Kukar (9 December 2018)
- Lowest attendance: 0 Persib 1–2 Madura United (9 October 2018); Arema 3–1 Bali United (20 October 2018); Persib 1–4 Persebaya (20 October 2018); Arema 5–0 PSMS (28 October 2018); Persib 1–1 Bali United (30 October 2018); Persib 0–1 PSMS (9 November 2018); Arema 4–1 Perseru (11 November 2018); Persib 2–2 Perseru (23 November 2018); Arema 3–1 Barito Putera (24 November 2018); Persib 3–3 Barito Putera (8 December 2018); Arema 2–1 Sriwijaya (9 December 2018)
- Total attendance: 3,101,694
- Average attendance: 10,136

The 2018 Liga 1, also known as Go-Jek Liga 1 for sponsorship reasons, was the 2nd season of Liga 1 under its current name and the 9th season of the top-flight Indonesian professional league for association football clubs since its establishment in 2008. The season started on 23 March 2018 and ended on 9 December 2018. Fixtures for the 2018 season were announced on 10 March 2018.

Bhayangkara were the defending champions. Persebaya, PSMS, and PSIS joined as the promoted teams from the 2017 Liga 2. They replaced Persegres, Persiba, and Semen Padang, which were relegated to the 2018 Liga 2.

Persija won their first Liga 1 title, and second Indonesian top-flight title overall on the final day of the season, finishing on 62 points.

== Overview ==
=== Player regulations ===
Player registration was divided into two periods. The first period opened from 10 February 2018 and closes on 5 April 2018. Then the second period was done on 5 July to 3 August 2018. Clubs could register at least 18 players and a maximum of 30 players. The club was also required to contract at least seven local U-23 players (born on or after 1 January 1996). Unlike last season, U-23 players were not required to play in one game.

Persija and Bali United got privileges related to player quota. Both were allowed to add three local players with no age limit, following their participation in the 2018 AFC Cup representing Indonesia.

=== Referee ===
Unlike last season, the league operator ensured that they did not use any foreign referees for this season.

== Teams ==
Eighteen teams competed in the league – the top fifteen teams from the previous season and three teams promoted from the Liga 2. The new teams this season were Persebaya, PSMS, and PSIS, who replaced Persegres, Persiba, and Semen Padang.

=== Name changes ===
- PS TNI were renamed to PS TIRA and relocated to Bantul.

=== Stadiums and locations ===
Locations of the 2018 Liga 1 teams

Team	Location	Stadium	Capacity
Arema	Malang	Kanjuruhan	42,449
Bali United	Gianyar	Kapten I Wayan Dipta	22,931
Barito Putera	Banjarmasin	May 17th	15,000
Bhayangkara	Jakarta	PTIK (Note: Bhayangkara moved their home base from Patriot Candrabhaga to PTIK. They also registered Gelora Delta to host the teams with huge number of supporters.)	3,000
Borneo	Samarinda	Segiri	16,000
Madura United	Pamekasan	Gelora Ratu Pamelingan (Note: Madura United held several of their home matches at Gelora Bangkalan.)	15,000
Mitra Kukar	Tenggarong	Aji Imbut	35,000
Persebaya	Surabaya	Gelora Bung Tomo	55,000
Persela	Lamongan	Surajaya	16,000
Perseru	Serui	Marora (Note: Perseru used Gajayana as their home ground during Ramadan because Marora did not pass the verification to hold night matches.)	5,000
Persib	Bandung	Gelora Bandung Lautan Api	38,000
Persija	Jakarta	Gelora Bung Karno (Note: Persija played at Sultan Agung since Gelora Bung Karno and all other venues in Greater Jakarta in which were used for the 2018 Asian Games should be sterilized. Then Persija played at Patriot Candrabhaga until the 2018 AFC U-19 Championship ended before they back again to Gelora Bung Karno.)	77,193
Persipura	Jayapura	Mandala	30,000
PS TIRA	Bantul	Sultan Agung (Note: PS TIRA moved their home base from Pakansari to Sultan Agung.)	35,000
PSIS	Magelang	Moch. Soebroto (Note: PSIS played their home matches at Moch. Soebroto due to the rebuilding of their stadium at Jatidiri. They also registered Sultan Agung to host the teams with huge number of supporters.)	20,000
PSM	Makassar	Andi Mattalata	15,000
PSMS	Medan	Teladan	20,000
Sriwijaya	Palembang	Gelora Sriwijaya	23,000

=== Personnel and kits ===
Note: Flags indicate national team as has been defined under FIFA eligibility rules. Players and coaches may hold more than one non-FIFA nationality.

Team	Head coach	Captain	Kit manufacturer	Shirt Sponsor(s)
Arema	(Slovenia) Milan Petrović	(Indonesia) Hamka Hamzah	Specs	Corsa^{1}, Achilles^{1}, Indomie^{1}, Torabika^{1}, Go-Jek^{1}
Bali United	(Indonesia) Eko Purjianto (caretaker)	(Indonesia) Fadil Sausu	Made by Club	Mobil^{1}, Go-Jek^{1}, Envi^{1}, Torabika^{1}, Indofood^{1}, Smartfren^{1}, Bank Ina^{1}, Achilles^{1}, KukuBima Ener-G!^{1}, YCAB foundation^{1}, Cellular World^{1}, Indomie^{2}, Elevenia^{2}, Lion Parcel^{2}, ACA Asuransi^{3}, Corsa^{3}^{4}
Barito Putera	(Brazil) Jacksen F. Tiago	(Indonesia) Hansamu Yama	Umbro	Hasnur Group^{1}, Jhonlin Group^{1}, Haji Maming^{2}, Bank Kalsel^{2}, PT Buana Karya Wiratama^{2}, Mitra Hino^{3}
Bhayangkara	(Scotland) Simon McMenemy	(Indonesia) Indra Kahfi	Umbro	BNI^{1}, Bright Gas^{2}, Jasa Raharja^{3}, Nendia Primarasa^{3}
Borneo	(Serbia) Dejan Antonić	(Indonesia) Diego Michiels	Nike	Fun88 Bola^{1}, STM^{1}, Shinhan Bank^{1}, PayTren^{1}, Ansaf^{3}, BIB^{3}, Fisik Football^{3}
Madura United	(Brazil) Gomes de Olivera	(Brazil) Fabiano Beltrame	MBB	Integra Group^{1}, Adaro^{1}, Horison Hotel Group^{1}, Lion Air^{1}, POJUR^{1}, Torabika^{1}, Quick Chicken^{1}, Pool Advista^{2}
Mitra Kukar	(Indonesia) Rahmad Darmawan	(Indonesia) Bayu Pradana	Joma	Grand Elty Singgasana^{1}, ABP Energy^{1}, PT Putra Perkasa Abadi^{1}
Persebaya	(Indonesia) Djadjang Nurdjaman	(Indonesia) Rendi Irwan	Made by Club	Safe Care^{1}, Kapal Api^{1}, Men's Biore^{1}, Antangin^{2}, Go-Jek^{2}, Honda^{3}, MPM Distributor^{3}
Persela	(Indonesia) Aji Santoso	(Brazil) Wallace Costa	Forium	Go-Jek^{1}, So Nice^{1}, PayTren^{1}
Perseru	(Brazil) Wanderley da Silva	(Indonesia) Arthur Bonai	Noij Sportwear	PT Irian Jaya Sehat^{1}, Bank Papua^{1}, Trigana Air^{1}, PT Yapen Makmur^{2}, Pemerintah Kabupaten Kep. Yapen^{2}
Persib	(Argentina) Mario Gómez	(Indonesia) Supardi Nasir	Sportama	Pria Punya Selera^{1}, Elevenia^{1}, Corsa^{1}, Indofood^{1}, Go-Jek^{1}, Bank Permata^{1}, Kopi ABC^{2}, FWD^{2}, Envi^{3}, Indomie^{3}, GO-PAY^{4}
Persija	(Brazil) Stefano Cugurra	(Indonesia) Ismed Sofyan	Specs	Akulaku^{1}, KukuBima Ener-G!^{1}, Rasuna Epicentrum^{1}, Go-Jek^{1}, Tolak Angin^{2}, Bank DKI^{2}
Persipura	(Brazil) Osvaldo Lessa	(Indonesia) Boaz Solossa	Specs	PT Freeport Indonesia^{1}, Bank Papua^{1}
PS TIRA	(Indonesia) Nil Maizar	(Trinidad and Tobago) Radanfah Abu Bakr	MBB	Artha Graha Peduli Foundation^{1}, SCBD^{1}, Bank Artha Graha Internasional^{1}, Angels Products^{1}, Podjok Halal^{2}
PSIS	(Indonesia) Jafri Sastra	(Indonesia) Hari Nur Yulianto	RIORS	Corsa^{1}, Go-Jek^{1}, Indomie^{1}, Torabika^{1}, KukuBima Ener-G!^{2}
PSM	(Netherlands) Robert Alberts	(Netherlands) Wiljan Pluim	Umbro	Semen Bosowa^{1}, Go-Jek^{1}, Kopi ABC^{2}, Honda^{2}, KukuBima Ener-G!^{3}
PSMS	(England) Peter Butler	(Indonesia) Legimin Raharjo	Made by Club (Note: PSMS used DJ Sport as their kit manufacturer before changed it from week 21.)	Pelindo 1^{1}, Auto 2000^{1}, Torabika^{1}, North Cliff^{1}, Go-Jek^{1}, Indomie^{1}, Corsa^{1}, FIFGroup^{1}, Sinar Mas^{2}, M88FC^{1}
Sriwijaya	(Argentina) Alfredo Vera	(South Korea) Yoo Hyun-goo	Calci	KukuBima Ener-G!^{1}, Bank Sumsel Babel^{1}, Smartfren^{1}, Semen Baturaja^{1}, Perusahaan Gas Negara^{2}, PDPDE Sumsel^{2}, Go-Jek^{2}, Bukit Asam^{3}

Notes:

1. On the front of shirt.
2. On the back of shirt.
3. On the sleeves.
4. On the shorts.

Additionally, referee kits are made by Specs and Nike supplied the match ball.

Apparel changes:

=== Coaching changes ===
- Indicate the positions in the relegation zone.

Team	Outgoing coach	Manner of departure	Date of vacancy	Week	Table	Incoming coach	Date of appointment
Mitra Kukar	(Indonesia) Yudi Suryata	End of contract	12 November 2017	Pre-season		(Spain) Rafael Berges	20 December 2017
Persib	(Indonesia) Emral Abus	End of contract	15 November 2017	Pre-season		(Argentina) Mario Gómez	28 November 2017
Sriwijaya	(Indonesia) Hartono Ruslan	End of contract	24 November 2017	Pre-season		(Indonesia) Rahmad Darmawan	24 November 2017
Persipura	(Brazil) Wanderley da Silva	End of contract	26 November 2017	Pre-season		(England) Peter Butler	1 February 2018
Perseru	(Indonesia) Agus Yuwono	Resigned	11 January 2018	Pre-season		(Indonesia) Alexander Saununu	11 January 2018
Madura United	(Brazil) Gomes de Olivera	Resigned	28 February 2018	Pre-season		(Bosnia and Herzegovina) Milomir Šešlija	1 March 2018
Perseru	(Indonesia) Alexander Saununu	Demoted to assistant coach	10 March 2018	Pre-season		(Indonesia) I Putu Gede	10 March 2018
PSIS	(Indonesia) Subangkit	Sacked	15 March 2018	Pre-season		(Italy) Vincenzo Annese	23 March 2018
Borneo	(Indonesia) Iwan Setiawan	Sacked	27 March 2018	1	11	(Serbia) Dejan Antonić	28 March 2018
Arema	(Indonesia) Joko Susilo	Demoted to assistant coach	14 May 2018	8	18	(Slovenia) Milan Petrović	14 May 2018
PS TIRA	(Indonesia) Rudy Priyambada	Sacked	31 May 2018	11	16	(Indonesia) Miftahudin Mukson	1 June 2018
Madura United	(Bosnia and Herzegovina) Milomir Šešlija	Sacked	1 June 2018	11	5	(Indonesia) Djoko Susilo	1 June 2018
Madura United	(Indonesia) Djoko Susilo	End of caretaker role	20 June 2018	13	7	(Brazil) Gomes de Olivera	20 June 2018
Persipura	(England) Peter Butler	Sacked	21 June 2018	13	5	(Brazil) Amilton Silva	6 July 2018
PS TIRA	(Indonesia) Miftahudin Mukson	End of caretaker role	4 July 2018	13	14	(Indonesia) Nil Maizar	4 July 2018
PSMS	(Indonesia) Djadjang Nurdjaman	Sacked	13 July 2018	15	18	(England) Peter Butler	14 July 2018
Mitra Kukar	(Spain) Rafael Berges	Resigned	15 July 2018	15	16	(Indonesia) Didik Listyantoro	15 July 2018
Sriwijaya	(Indonesia) Rahmad Darmawan	Resigned	25 July 2018	17	12	(Indonesia) Subangkit	26 July 2018
Mitra Kukar	(Indonesia) Didik Listyantoro	End of caretaker role	31 July 2018	18	12	(Indonesia) Rahmad Darmawan	31 July 2018
Persebaya	(Argentina) Alfredo Vera	Resigned	2 August 2018	18	15	(Indonesia) Bejo Sugiantoro	2 August 2018
Persebaya	(Indonesia) Bejo Sugiantoro	End of caretaker role	14 August 2018	20	13	(Indonesia) Djadjang Nurdjaman	25 August 2018
PSIS	(Italy) Vincenzo Annese	Sacked	23 August 2018	20	17	(Indonesia) Jafri Sastra	23 August 2018
Perseru	(Indonesia) I Putu Gede	Resigned	24 September 2018	23	17	(Brazil) Wanderley da Silva	28 September 2018
Persipura	(Brazil) Amilton Silva	Resigned	25 September 2018	23	8	(Brazil) Osvaldo Lessa	26 September 2018
Sriwijaya	(Indonesia) Subangkit	Demoted to U19s coach	19 October 2018	26	13	(Argentina) Alfredo Vera	21 October 2018
Bali United	(Indonesia) Widodo C. Putro	Mutual consent	29 November 2018	32	7	(Indonesia) Eko Purjianto	29 November 2018

== Foreign players ==
Football Association of Indonesia restricted the number of foreign players to four per team, including one slot for a player from AFC countries. Teams can use all the foreign players at once.

- Players name in **bold** indicates the player was registered during the mid-season transfer window.
- Former Player(s) were players that out of squad or left club within the season, after pre-season transfer window, or in the mid-season transfer window, and at least had one appearance.

Team	Player 1	Player 2	Player 3	Asian Player	Former Player(s)
Arema	(Brazil) Arthur Cunha	(Mali) **Makan Konaté**	(Serbia) **Srđan Ostojić**		(Brazil) Thiago Furtuoso (Montenegro) Balša Božović (Turkmenistan) Ahmet Ataýew
Bali United	(Mali) **Mahamadou N'Diaye**	(Netherlands) **Melvin Platje**	(Netherlands) Nick van der Velden	(Iraq) **Brwa Nouri**	(Brazil) Demerson (South Korea) Ahn Byung-keon (Montenegro) Miloš Krkotić
Barito Putera	(Argentina) Matías Córdoba	(Brazil) Douglas Packer	(Brazil) **Marcel Sacramento**	(Australia) Aaron Evans	(Colombia) Juan Pablo Pino
Bhayangkara	(Montenegro) Vladimir Vujović	(Portugal) **Élio Martins**	(Portugal) Paulo Sérgio	(South Korea) Lee Yoo-joon	(Serbia) Nikola Komazec
Borneo	(Argentina) **Matías Conti**	(Brazil) **Renan Alves**	(Tunisia) **Tijani Belaïd**	(Kyrgyzstan) Azamat Baymatov	(Brazil) Marlon da Silva (Martinique) Julien Faubert (Montenegro) Srđan Lopičić
Madura United	(Brazil) Fabiano Beltrame	(Liberia) Zah Rahan Krangar	(Mali) **Mamadou Samassa**	(Iran) **Milad Zeneyedpour**	(Brazil) Beto de Paula (Tajikistan) Nuriddin Davronov
Mitra Kukar	(Brazil) Mauricio Leal	(England) Danny Guthrie	(Spain) Fernando Rodríguez	(South Korea) Yoo Jae-hoon	
Persebaya	(Argentina) Robertino Pugliara	(Brazil) David da Silva	(Brazil) Otávio Dutra		
Persela	(Brazil) Diego Assis	(Brazil) Wallace Costa	(France) Loris Arnaud	(Turkmenistan) **Ahmet Ataýew**	(Japan) Shohei Matsunaga
Perseru	(Brazil) **Beto de Paula**	(Brazil) **Mazinho**	(Paraguay) Sílvio Escobar	(Japan) Kunihiro Yamashita	(Ivory Coast) Boman Aimé (Netherlands) Djamel Leeflang
Persib	(Argentina) Jonatan Bauman	(Chad) Ezechiel N'Douassel	(Serbia) Bojan Mališić	(South Korea) Oh In-kyun	
Persija	(Brazil) Jaimerson	(Brazil) **Renan Silva**	(Croatia) Marko Šimić	(Nepal) Rohit Chand	(Brazil) Addison Alves (Brazil) Ivan Carlos
Persipura	(Brazil) **Addison Alves**	(Brazil) Hilton Moreira	(Brazil) **Márcio Rosário**		(Brazil) Marcel Sacramento (Mali) Abdoulaye Maïga
PS TIRA	(Belarus) **Dzmitry Rekish**	(Serbia) Aleksandar Rakić	(Trinidad and Tobago) **Radanfah Abu Bakr**	(South Korea) **Jeon Woo-young**	(Argentina) Gustavo López (Argentina) Mariano Berriex (South Korea) Kim Sang-min
PSIS	(Brazil) Bruno Silva	(Serbia) Petar Planić	(Sierra Leone) Ibrahim Conteh		(Lebanon) Abou Bakr Al-Mel (Kyrgyzstan) Akhlidin Israilov
PSM	(France) Steven Paulle	(Netherlands) Marc Klok	(Netherlands) Wiljan Pluim	(Hong Kong) **Sandro**	(Australia) Bruce Djite
PSMS	(Brazil) **Felipe Martins**	(Brazil) Reinaldo Lobo	(Greece) **Alexandros Tanidis**	(Japan) **Shohei Matsunaga**	(Ivory Coast) Wilfried Yessoh (Namibia) Sadney Urikhob (Uzbekistan) Dilshod Sharofetdinov
Sriwijaya	(Brazil) **Alan Henrique**	(South Korea) Yoo Hyun-goo	(North Macedonia) **Goran Gančev**	(Tajikistan) Manuchekhr Dzhalilov	(Mali) Mahamadou N'Diaye (Mali) Makan Konaté

Source: First transfer window, Second transfer window

== League table ==
Pos	Team	Pld	W	D	L	GF	GA	GD	Pts	Qualification or relegation
1	Persija (C)	34	18	8	8	53	36	+17	62	Qualification for the AFC Champions League preliminary round 1
2	PSM	34	17	10	7	57	42	+15	61	Qualification for the AFC Cup group stage
3	Bhayangkara (Note: Bhayangkara would have qualified for the AFC Cup group stage had Persija qualified for the AFC Champions League group stage. As Persija failed to qualify for the AFC Champions League group stage, Bhayangkara's qualification in the AFC Cup was annulled.)	34	15	8	11	41	39	+2	53	
4	Persib	34	14	10	10	49	41	+8	52	
5	Persebaya	34	14	8	12	60	48	+12	50 (Note: Head-to-head results: Persebaya 1–0 Arema; Arema 1–0 Persebaya)	
6	Arema	34	14	8	12	53	42	+11	50	
7	Borneo	34	14	6	14	50	49	+1	48 (Note: Head-to-head results: Madura United 1–2 Borneo, Borneo 2–2 Madura United)	
8	Madura United	34	13	9	12	47	50	−3	48	
9	Barito Putera	34	12	11	11	52	55	−3	47	
10	PSIS	34	13	7	14	39	42	−3	46	
11	Bali United	34	12	9	13	44	48	−4	45	
12	Persipura	34	12	8	14	49	46	+3	44	
13	Persela	34	11	10	13	53	52	+1	43	
14	Perseru	34	11	9	14	34	41	−7	42 (Note: Head-to-head results: Perseru 0–0 PS TIRA; PS TIRA 0–1 Perseru)	
15	PS TIRA	34	12	6	16	48	57	−9	42	
16	Mitra Kukar (R)	34	12	3	19	45	58	−13	39 (Note: Head-to-head results: Mitra Kukar 3–0 Sriwijaya; Sriwijaya 3–1 Mitra Kukar)	Relegation to Liga 2
17	Sriwijaya (R)	34	11	6	17	48	56	−8	39	Relegation to Liga 2
18	PSMS (Note: PSMS were deducted three points due to FIFA sanction.) (R)	34	11	4	19	50	70	−20	34	Relegation to Liga 2

Source: Go-Jek Liga 1, Soccerway
Rules for classification: 1) Points; 2) Head-to-head; 3) Goal difference; 4) Goals scored; 5) Drawing.
(C) Champions; (R) Relegated

== Results ==
Home \ Away	ARE	BLU	BPT	BHA	BOR	MDU	MKU	PBY	PSL	PSR	PSB	PSJ	PPR	TIR	SMG	PSM	MED	SRI
Arema	—	3–1	3–1	4–0	2–2	2–0	2–2	1–0	1–0	4–1	2–2	1–1	3–1	2–2	1–0	1–1	5–0	2–1
Bali United	1–0	—	2–0	2–3	2–2	2–0	1–0	2–5	3–2	1–1	0–0	1–2	2–0	1–1	2–0	2–0	1–0	3–4
Barito Putera	0–0	1–1	—	3–1	1–0	0–0	2–1	3–2	1–1	0–0	2–2	2–1	2–2	3–1	4–1	2–1	3–3	3–1
Bhayangkara	0–0	2–0	2–2	—	1–1	1–0	1–0	3–3	1–1	1–0	1–2	0–0	2–0	4–2	1–1	0–0	3–1	2–0
Borneo	2–1	2–0	2–1	3–0	—	2–2	3–2 (Note: Borneo hosted Mitra Kukar at Batakan because Segiri declared not pass the verification to hold night matches by PT LIB.)	2–2	3–2	5–1	0–1 (Note: Borneo hosted Persib at Batakan because Segiri still under lighting renovation.)	0–1 (Note: Borneo hosted Persija at Aji Imbut because Segiri was still under lighting renovation.)	2–1	1–3	2–1	1–2	3–1	0–0
Madura United	3–2	2–2	3–1	1–2	1–2	—	2–0	2–2	2–1	2–0	2–1	0–1	2–2	3–1	2–2	3–0	1–0	3–0
Mitra Kukar	4–3	3–1	3–4	0–1	0–1	3–1	—	3–1	1–1	2–0	1–0	0–2	2–1	1–0	2–0	1–4	1–0	3–0
Persebaya	1–0	1–0	1–2	1–0	0–1	4–0	4–1	—	3–1	1–0	3–4	3–0	1–1	0–2	1–0	3–0	2–0	1–1
Persela	4–0	1–1	2–1	2–0	2–0	1–1	3–1	1–1	—	0–0	1–1	2–0	3–2	4–1	1–1	1–1	4–1	3–0
Perseru	0–1	1–2	0–1	1–0	3–1	2–0	3–1	3–1	2–0	—	0–0	3–1	0–0	0–0	1–0	0–1	1–1	1–0
Persib	2–0	1–1 (Note: Persib hosted Bali United at Batakan as part of the Disciplinary Commission PSSI punishment.)	3–3 (Note: Persib hosted Barito Putera at Kapten I Wayan Dipta as part of the Disciplinary Commission PSSI punishment.)	0–1	3–1	1–2 (Note: Persib hosted Madura United at Batakan as part of the Disciplinary Commission PSSI punishment.)	2–0	1–4 (Note: Persib hosted Persebaya at Kapten I Wayan Dipta as part of the Disciplinary Commission PSSI punishment.)	1–0	2–2 (Note: Persib hosted Perseru at Kapten I Wayan Dipta as part of the Disciplinary Commission PSSI punishment.)	—	3–2	2–0	1–1	1–0	3–0	0–1 (Note: Persib hosted PSMS at Kapten I Wayan Dipta as part of the Disciplinary Commission PSSI punishment.)	2–0
Persija	3–1	0–2	3–0	1–0	2–0	0–2	2–1	1–1 (Note: Persija played their delayed match against Persebaya at PTIK.)	3–0	2–1	1–0 (Note: Persija played their delayed match against Persib at PTIK.)	—	2–0 (Note: Persija hosted Persipura at Pakansari because Gelora Bung Karno should be sterilized for 2018 Asian Games.)	0–0 (Note: Persija hosted PS TIRA at Wibawa Mukti because they didn't get police permission to hold a match at Patriot Candrabhaga.)	1–0	2–2	0–0	3–2 (Note: Persija hosted Sriwijaya at Wibawa Mukti because neither Gelora Bung Karno nor Patriot Candrabhaga can be used.)
Persipura	1–0	1–0	5–1	0–2	2–0	6–0	2–1	3–1	2–1	0–2	1–1	1–2	—	2–0	0–0	1–1	3–1	1–0
PS TIRA	0–1	2–1	1–0	2–0	3–4	1–0	0–0	1–4	4–1	0–1	2–3	0–5	1–0	—	0–1	1–2	3–2	3–0
PSIS	2–1	0–0	1–0	1–2	1–0	0–0	4–0	1–0	3–1	4–2	3–0	1–4	2–1	0–2	—	1–1	4–1	1–0
PSM	2–1	4–0	1–1	2–1 (Note: PSM hosted Bhayangkara at Kapten I Wayan Dipta because Andi Mattalata declared not pass the verification to hold night matches by PT LIB.)	1–0	2–0	3–1	1–0	2–3	2–2	1–0	2–2	4–2	4–3	2–0	—	5–1	2–0
PSMS	2–0	1–2	3–2	1–2	3–2	3–3	1–3	4–0	3–2	1–0	0–3	3–1	1–3	2–4	2–3	3–1	—	1–0
Sriwijaya	0–3	3–2	2–0	2–1	1–0 (Note: Sriwijaya hosted Borneo at Haji Agus Salim as a result of destructive action by their supporters when they played Arema in Gelora Sriwijaya.)	1–2 (Note: Sriwijaya hosted Madura United at Haji Agus Salim because Gelora Sriwijaya should be sterilized for 2018 Asian Games.)	3–1	3–3	5–1	4–0	3–1	2–2	2–2	4–1	4–0	0–0	0–3	—

Source: Go-Jek Liga 1 2018, Soccerway
Legend: Blue = home team win; Yellow = draw; Red = away team win.
For upcoming matches, an "a" indicates there is an article about the rivalry between the two participants.

== Season statistics ==
=== Top goalscorers ===
Rank	Player	Team	Goals
1	(Serbia) Aleksandar Rakić	PS TIRA	21
2	(Brazil) David da Silva	Persebaya	20
3	(Croatia) Marko Šimić	Persija	18
4	(Chad) Ezechiel N'Douassel	Persib	17
5	(Brazil) Bruno Silva	PSIS	16
6	(Spain) Fernando Rodríguez	Mitra Kukar	15
6	(France) Loris Arnaud	Persela	15
8	(Indonesia) Samsul Arif	Barito Putera	14
8	(Japan) Shohei Matsunaga	Persela/PSMS	14

=== Hat-tricks ===
Player	For	Against	Result	Date
(Brazil) David da Silva	Persebaya	PS TIRA	4–1 (A)	13 April 2018
(Brazil) Bruno Silva	PSIS	PSMS	4–1 (H)	15 April 2018
(Serbia) Aleksandar Rakić	PS TIRA	PSM	3–4 (A)	21 April 2018
(Indonesia) Samsul Arif^{4}	Barito Putera	Mitra Kukar	4–3 (A)	6 July 2018
(Indonesia) Dendy Sulistyawan	Persela	Persipura	3–2 (H)	29 July 2018
(Brazil) David da Silva	Persebaya	Mitra Kukar	4–1 (H)	22 September 2018
(Indonesia) Osvaldo Haay	Persebaya	Madura United	4–0 (H)	25 October 2018
(Argentina) Matías Conti	Borneo	Bhayangkara	3–0 (H)	29 October 2018
(Brazil) David da Silva	Persebaya	Bali United	5–2 (A)	18 November 2018
(Serbia) Aleksandar Rakić	PS TIRA	PSMS	4–2 (A)	5 December 2018

Note: ^{4} Player scored 4 goals

=== Discipline ===
- Most yellow card(s): 12
  - (Netherlands) Marc Klok (PSM)
- Most red card(s): 3
  - (Mali) Mahamadou N'Diaye (Bali United/Sriwijaya)

== Attendances ==
Pos	Team	Total	High	Low	Average	Change
1	Persebaya	485,231	50,000	10,426	28,543	+0.1%^{†}
2	Persija	374,733	68,873	976	22,043	−4.4%
3	Persib	272,291	36,500	0	16,017	−11.0%
4	Bali United	258,433	22,210	8,114	15,202	+13.3%
5	PSM	221,025	14,898	510	13,001	−5.6%
6	PSIS	208,545	19,695	5,207	12,267	+112.3%^{†}
7	Persipura	193,090	16,326	5,331	11,358	−8.3%
8	Arema	190,802	44,912	0	11,224	+11.7%
9	PSMS	179,565	20,000	2,276	10,563	−3.2%^{†}
10	Persela	173,943	16,000	5,075	10,232	−0.3%
11	Sriwijaya	151,306	20,712	285	8,900	+5.4%
12	Barito Putera	85,573	9,017	1,659	5,034	−12.7%
13	Madura United	82,560	13,410	1,366	4,856	−5.7%
14	Borneo	72,504	10,329	1,235	4,265	−37.7%
15	Bhayangkara	64,225	39,425	1,125	3,778	−24.2%
16	Mitra Kukar	36,076	3,425	1,138	2,122	−6.5%
17	Perseru	26,407	8,203	170	1,553	−48.3%
18	PS TIRA	25,385	6,924	67	1,493	−34.2%
	League total	3,101,694	68,873	0	10,136	+16.5%

Source: Go-Jek Liga 1 2018
Notes:
^{†} Teams played previous season in Liga 2

== Awards ==
=== Annual ===
Award	Winner
Best Player	(Nepal) Rohit Chand (Persija)
Best Young Player	(Indonesia) Osvaldo Haay (Persebaya)
Best Coach	(Brazil) Stefano Cugurra (Persija)
Fair Play Team	Barito Putera
Best Referee	(Indonesia) Thoriq Alkatiri

=== Team of the season ===
Best XI
Goalkeeper	(Indonesia) Andritany Ardhiyasa (Persija)			
Defenders	(Indonesia) Alfath Fathier (Madura United)	(Indonesia) Fachrudin Aryanto (Madura United)	(Indonesia) Hansamu Yama (Barito Putera)	(Indonesia) Ardi Idrus (Persib)
Midfielders	(Indonesia) Riko Simanjuntak (Persija)	(Nepal) Rohit Chand (Persija)	(Netherlands) Wiljan Pluim (PSM)	(Indonesia) Osvaldo Haay (Persebaya)
Forwards	(Argentina) Jonatan Bauman (Persib)		(Brazil) David da Silva (Persebaya)	

== See also ==
- 2018 Liga 2
- 2018 Liga 3
- 2018–19 Piala Indonesia
