= 2019 Persija Jakarta season =

Persija Jakarta
2019 season
- Owner: PT Persija Jaya Jakarta
- CEO: Ferry Paulus
- Head Coach: (Bulgaria) Ivan Kolev (from 15 January 2019 until 8 June 2019) (Spain) Julio Bañuelos Sáez (from 8 June 2019 until 19 September 2019) (Indonesia) Sudirman (Caretaker) (from 20 September 2019 until 29 September 2019) (Brazil) Edson Tavares (from 29 September 2019)
- Stadium: Gelora Bung Karno Main Stadium; Patriot Chandrabhaga Stadium; Wibawa Mukti Stadium; Gelora Bung Karno Madya Stadium
- Liga 1: 10th
- 2018-19 Piala Indonesia: Runner-up
- AFC Champions League: Preliminary round 2
- AFC Cup: Group stage
- Top goalscorer: League: Marko Šimić (28); All: Marko Šimić (34)
- Highest home attendance: 70,306 (vs PSM Makassar at 2018-19 Piala Indonesia Finals)
- Lowest home attendance: 4,124 (vs Kalteng Putra at 2019 Liga 1)
- Biggest win: Persija Jakarta 8–2 757 Kepri Jaya F.C. (23 January 2019)
Home colours	Away colours	Third colours

The 2019 season is Persija's 86th competitive season. They have not been relegated since the competition started in 1933. This season is Persija's 25th consecutive seasons in top-flight since professional competition formed on 1994. Along with Liga 1, the club will compete in 2018-19 Piala Indonesia, 2019–20 Piala Indonesia and 2019 AFC Champions League since 2001–02 season. The season covers the period from 1 January 2019 to 31 December 2019.

== Coaching staff ==
Position	Staff
First-team Coach	(Brazil) Edson Tavares
Assistant Coach	vacant
Assistant Coach	vacant
Goalkeeper Coach	(Indonesia) Ahmad Fauzi
Physical Coach	(Brazil) Antônio Cláudio de Jesus Oliveira
Masseur	(Indonesia) Aditya Julistiawan (Indonesia) Akhmad Aditya Subkhi
Team Doctor	(Indonesia) Donny Kurniawan
Kitman	(Indonesia) Abdul Rahman Saleh

=== Management ===
Chairman	(Indonesia)
Chief Executive Officer	(Indonesia) Ambono Janurianto
Financial Director	(Indonesia) Koko Afiat
Sporting Director	(Indonesia) Ferry Paulus
Marketing Director	(Indonesia) Andhika Suksmana
Manager	(Indonesia) Ardhi Tjahjoko
Assistant Manager	(Indonesia) Abel Anmas
Match Organizing Committee	(Indonesia) Haen Rahmawan
Club Secretary	(Indonesia) Edy Syahputra
Media Officer	(Indonesia)
Chief Commercial Officer	vacant
Ground (capacity and dimensions)	Gelora Bung Karno (76,127 / 105x68 metres)
Training Ground	Lapangan Sutasoma 77

== New contracts ==
No.	Pos	Player/Staff	Contract length	Contract end	Date	Source
32	CM	(Nepal) Rohit Chand Thakuri	1 year	22 February 2020	23 February 2019	
9	FW	(Croatia) Marko Šimić	4 year	31 January 2022	23 January 2019	

== Transfers ==
=== In ===
No.	Pos	Player	Transferred From	Fee	Date	Source
	MF	(Indonesia) Jefri Kurniawan	(Indonesia) Arema F.C.	End of Loan	9 December 2018	
4	DF	(Indonesia) Ryuji Utomo Prabowo	(Thailand) PTT Rayong F.C.	End of Loan	26 December 2018	
3	DF	(Indonesia) Dany Saputra	(Indonesia) Bhayangkara F.C.	End of Loan	31 December 2018	
30	GK	(Indonesia) Muhammad Rizky Darmawan	(Indonesia) Persita Tangerang	End of Loan	31 December 2018	
44	MF	(Indonesia) Muhammad Rasul	(Indonesia) Kalteng Putra F.C.	End of Loan	31 December 2018	
10	MF	(Brazil) Bruno Oliveira de Matos	(Malaysia) PKNS FC	Free	5 January 2019	
94	FW	(Indonesia) Heri Susanto	(Indonesia) PSM Makassar	Free	8 January 2019	
77	MF	(Uzbekistan) Jahongir Abdumominov	(Tajikistan) Istiklol	Free	11 January 2019	
13	DF	(Brazil) Vinícius Lopes Laurindo	(Iran) Foolad F.C.	Free	18 January 2019	
16	DF	(Indonesia) Tony Sucipto	(Indonesia) Persib Bandung	Free	18 January 2019	
21	FW	(Paraguay) Silvio Escobar Benitez	(Indonesia) Perseru Serui	Free	22 February 2019	
86	CB	(France) Steven Renaud Paulle	(Indonesia) PSM Makassar	Free	23 February 2019	
77	MF	(Indonesia) Yogi Rahadian	(Indonesia) Sriwijaya F.C.	Free	19 March 2019	
2	DF	(Brazil) Xandão	(Brazil) Guarani FC	Rp 11 m	30 August 2019	
21	FW	(Paraguay) Silvio Escobar Benitez	(Indonesia) PSIS Semarang	End of Loan	30 August 2019	
18	MF	(Spain) Joan Tomàs Campasol	(Greece) PAS Lamia 1964	?	31 August 2019	
99	MF	(Indonesia) Rachmad Hidayat	(Indonesia) Bhayangkara F.C.	Free	16 September 2019	
10	FW	(Indonesia) Farri Agri	(Qatar) Al-Markhiya SC	Free	18 September 2019	

=== Out ===
No.	Pos	Player	Transferred To	Fee	Date	Source
70	MF	(Brazil) Renan Silva	(Indonesia) Borneo F.C.	Free	29 December 2018	
81	DF	(Indonesia) Vava Mario Yagalo	(Indonesia) TIRA-Persikabo	Released	8 February 2019	
30	GK	(Indonesia) Rizky Darmawan	(Indonesia) Mitra Kukar F.C.	End of Contract	1 January 2019	
16	MF	(Indonesia) Asri Akbar	(Indonesia) Borneo F.C.	Free	1 January 2019	
13	DF	(Indonesia) Gunawan Dwi Cahyo	(Indonesia) Bali United	Free	1 January 2019	
10	FW	(Indonesia) Rudi Widodo	(Indonesia) PSS Sleman	End of Contract	1 January 2019	
77	FW	(Indonesia) Frengky Kogoya	(Indonesia) Badak Lampung F.C.	Free	1 January 2019	
99	FW	(Indonesia) Ahmad Syaifullah	(Indonesia) Badak Lampung F.C.	Free	1 January 2019	
5	DF	(Brazil) Jaimerson da Silva Xavier	(Indonesia) Madura United	Free	10 January 2019	
85	LB	(Indonesia) Michael Yansen Orah	(Indonesia) Bali United	End of Loan	1 January 2019	
77	MF	(Uzbekistan) Jahongir Abdumuminov	(Uzbekistan) FK Buxoro	Released	26 February 2019	
13	DF	(Brazil) Vinicius Lopes Laurindo	(Portugal) U.D. Vilafranquense	Released	26 February 2019	
79	FW	(Indonesia) Osas Saha	(Indonesia) TIRA-Persikabo	Free	28 February 2019	
	MF	(Indonesia) Jefri Kurniawan	(Indonesia) Badak Lampung F.C.	Free	9 April 2019	
34	GK	(Indonesia) Daryono	(Indonesia) Badak Lampung F.C.	Released	23 May 2019	
89	MF	(Indonesia) Septinus Alua	(Indonesia) PSIS Semarang	Released	25 May 2019	
23	MF	(Indonesia) Nugroho Fatchurahman	(Indonesia) PSIM Yogyakarta	Free	18 August 2019	
10	MF	(Brazil) Bruno Oliveira de Matos	(Indonesia) Bhayangkara F.C.	Released	22 August 2019	
86	DF	(France) Steven Paulle		Released	22 August 2019	
8	MF	(Indonesia) Yan Pieter Nasadit	(Indonesia) Kalteng Putra F.C.	Free	16 September 2019	
77	MF	(Indonesia) Yogi Rahadian	(Indonesia) Badak Lampung F.C.	Free	16 September 2019	
21	FW	(Paraguay) Silvio Escobar Benitez	(Indonesia) Mitra Kukar F.C.	Free	18 September 2019	

=== Loan In ===
No.	Pos	Player	Loaned From	Start	End	Source
72	FW	(Indonesia) Rishadi Fauzi	(Indonesia) Persebaya	25 January 2019	24 June 2019	
5	DF	(Brazil) Jaimerson Xavier	(Indonesia) Madura United F.C.	30 January 2019	28 February 2019	
90	FW	(Indonesia) Beto Gonçalves	(Indonesia) Madura United F.C.	30 January 2019	28 February 2019	
41	MF	(Indonesia) Feby Eka Putra	(Indonesia) Bali United F.C.	10 May 2019	31 December 2019	
19	DF	(Indonesia) Fachrudin Aryanto	(Indonesia) Madura United F.C.	31 August 2019	31 December 2019	

=== Loan Out ===
No.	Pos	Player	Loaned to	Start	End	Source
47	DF	(Indonesia) Anan Lestaluhu	(Indonesia) Bali United F.C.	31 May 2019	31 December 2019	
21	FW	(Paraguay) Silvio Escobar Benitez	(Indonesia) PSIS Semarang	11 May 2019	30 August 2019	

== Squad information ==
=== First team squad ===
No.	Name	Nat.	Date of birth (age)	Signed in	Contract until	Signed from	Transfer Fee	Notes
Goalkeepers
26	Andritany Ardhiyasa	(Indonesia)	26 December 1991 (age 34)	2010	2020	(Indonesia) Sriwijaya	?	Captain
29	Adixi Lenzivio	(Indonesia)	29 September 1993 (age 33)	2019	2019	?	?	Originally from Youth system
88	Shahar Ginanjar	(Indonesia)	4 November 1990 (age 36)	2019	2022	(Indonesia) PSM Makassar	Free	
22	Risky Sudirman	(Indonesia)	2 February 2002 (age 24)	2019		?		Under-23 Player; Originally from Youth system
Defenders
2	Xandão	(Brazil)	23 February 1988 (age 38)	2019	2020	(Brazil) Guarani FC	?	Foreign Player
3	Dany Saputra	(Indonesia)	1 January 1991 (age 35)	2017		(Indonesia) Bhayangkara F.C.		
4	Ryuji Utomo Prabowo	(Indonesia)	1 July 1995 (age 31)	2017	2020	(Indonesia) Arema F.C.	Free	
6	Maman Abdurrahman	(Indonesia)	12 May 1982 (age 44)	2015	2019	(Indonesia) Persita Tangerang	?	
14	Ismed Sofyan	(Indonesia)	28 August 1979 (age 47)	2003		(Indonesia) Persijatim Jakarta Timur	?	Vice Captain
16	Tony Sucipto	(Indonesia)	12 February 1986 (age 40)	2019	2019	(Indonesia) Persib Bandung	?	
19	Fachrudin Aryanto	(Indonesia)	19 February 1989 (age 37)	2019	2019	(Indonesia) Madura United F.C.	Loan	
28	Muhammad Rezaldi Hehanusa	(Indonesia)	7 November 1995 (age 31)	2016	2019	(Indonesia) Persitangsel Tangerang Selatan	?	
40	Al Hamra Hehanusa	(Indonesia)	20 July 1999 (age 27)	2019		?	?	Under-23 Player; Originally from Youth system
81	Adrianus Dwiki Arya Poernomo	(Indonesia)	1 May 2000 (age 26)	2019		?	?	Under-23 Player; Originally from Youth system
Midfielders
7	Rizki Ramdani Lestaluhu	(Indonesia)	5 November 1991 (age 35)	2014	2019	(Indonesia) Sriwijaya	?	Originally from Youth system
11	Novri Setiawan	(Indonesia)	11 November 1993 (age 32)	2014		(Indonesia) Persebaya Surabaya	?	
17	Fitra Ridwan Salam	(Indonesia)	16 March 1994 (age 32)	2017		(Indonesia) Persegres Gresik United	?	
18	Joan Tomàs Campasol	(Spain)	17 May 1985 (age 41)	2019		(Greece) PAS Lamia 1964	?	Foreign Player
24	Resky Fandi Witriawan	(Indonesia)	1 February 1999 (age 27)	2019		(Indonesia) Semen Padang	Free	Under-23 Player; Originally from Youth system
32	Rohit Chand Thakuri	(Nepal)	1 March 1992 (age 27)	2017		(Nepal) Manang Marshyangdi Club	Free	Foreign Player
41	Feby Eka Putra	(Indonesia)	12 February 1999 (age 27)	2019	2019	(Indonesia) Bali United	Loan	Under-23 Player
45	Sandi Darma Sute	(Indonesia)	20 September 1992 (age 34)	2017	2019	(Indonesia) Borneo	?	
99	Rachmad Hidayat	(Indonesia)	10 March 1991 (age 35)	2019	2019	(Indonesia) Bhayangkara F.C.	Free	
Forwards
9	Marko Šimić	(Croatia)	23 January 1989 (age 37)	2017	2022	(Malaysia) Melaka United	?	Foreign Player
10	Farri Agri	(Indonesia)	8 August 1992 (age 34)	2019	2019	(Qatar) Al-Markhiya SC	Free	
20	Bambang Pamungkas	(Indonesia)	10 June 1980 (age 46)	2014		(Indonesia) Pelita Bandung Raya	?	2nd Vice Captain
25	Riko Simanjuntak	(Indonesia)	26 January 1992 (age 34)	2018	2019	(Indonesia) Semen Padang	Free	
71	Sutan Zico	(Indonesia)	7 April 2002 (age 24)	2019	?	?	?	Under-23 Player; Originally from Youth system
90	Taufik Hidayat	(Indonesia)	1 January 2000 (age 26)	2019	?	(Indonesia) Sriwijaya F.C.	Free	Under-23 Player
94	Heri Susanto	(Indonesia)	15 July 1994 (age 32)	2019	2019	(Indonesia) PSM Makassar	Free	

== Pre-season ==
Win Draw Loss

=== Friendly Matches ===
13 January 2019 Friendly	Lampung All Star	0–0	Persija Jakarta	Bandar Lampung, Lampung
15.30 (UTC+7)				Stadium: Sumpah Pemuda Stadium

13 January 2019 Friendly	Pra Pon Lampung	0–1	Persija Jakarta	Bandar Lampung, Lampung
16.30 (UTC+7)			Indra 45+1' (pen.)	Stadium: Sumpah Pemuda Stadium

=== 2019 Indonesia President's Cup ===
==== Group stage ====
Pos	Team	Pld	W	D	L	GF	GA	GD	Pts	Qualification
1	Persija	3	2	1	0	9	2	+7	7 (Note: Head-to-head points: Persija 1, Madura United 1)	Knockout stage
2	Madura United	3	2	1	0	5	2	+3	7	Knockout stage
3	PSS (H)	3	1	0	2	2	4	−2	3	
4	Borneo	3	0	0	3	0	8	−8	0	

Source: Matches
Rules for classification: 1) Points; 2) Head-to-head; 3) Goal difference; 4) Goal scored.
(H) Hosts
Notes:

Win Draw Loss

5 March 2019 2019 Indonesia President's Cup Group D	Persija Jakarta	5–0	Borneo F.C.	Sleman, Special Region of Yogyakarta
18:30 (UTC+7)	Novri 15', 23'; Matos 19'; Ramdani 50'; Heri 90'	Report		Stadium: Maguwoharjo Stadium; Attendance: 7,380; Referee: Handri Kristanto (Semarang)

10 March 2019 2019 Indonesia President's Cup Group D	Madura United F.C.	2–2	Persija Jakarta	Sleman, Special Region of Yogyakarta
15:30 (UTC+7)	Rakić 36', 68'	Report	Matos 52'; Ryuji 59'	Stadium: Maguwoharjo Stadium; Attendance: 6,299; Referee: Adi Riyanto (Kendal)

15 March 2019 2019 Indonesia President's Cup Group D	PSS Sleman	0–2	Persija Jakarta	Sleman, Special Region of Yogyakarta
18:30 (UTC+7)		Report	Matos 59', 86' (pen.)	Stadium: Maguwoharjo Stadium; Attendance: 29,150; Referee: Handri Kristanto (Semarang)

==== Knockout phase ====
28 March 2019 Quarter-Finals	Persija Jakarta	1–1 (3–4 p)	Kalteng Putra F.C.	Bekasi, West Java
15:30 (UTC+7)	Patrich Wanggai 56'	Report	Matos 78'	Stadium: Patriot Candrabhaga Stadium; Referee: Thoriq Munir Alkatiri (Bandung)
	Penalties
	Ismed (penalty scored); Fitra (penalty missed); Chand (penalty scored); Matos (penalty missed); Ryuji (penalty scored)		(penalty missed) Sukadana; (penalty scored) Pahabol; (penalty scored) O.K. John; (penalty scored) Rizky; (penalty scored) Campos

== Competitions ==
=== Overview ===
Competition	Record								Started round	Final position / round	First match	Last match
Competition	G	W	D	L	GF	GA	GD	Win %	Started round	Final position / round	First match	Last match
Liga 1	34	11	11	12	43	42	+1	32.35	—	In Progress	20 May 2019	22 December 2019
2018-19 Piala Indonesia	10	5	3	2	18	11	+7	50.00	First Round — Zone 5	Runner-up	9 August 2018	6 August 2019
AFC Champions League	2	1	0	1	4	4	+0	50.00	Preliminary round 1	Preliminary round 2	5 February 2019	12 February 2019
AFC Cup	6	2	1	3	12	9	+3	33.33	Group Stage	Group Stage	26 February 2019	15 May 2019
Total	52	19	15	18	77	66	+11	36.54				

Updated to match played 22 December 2019
Source: Competitions

=== Liga 1 ===

Persija XI Shopee Liga 1 2019

==== League table ====
Locations of the 2019 Liga 1 teams

Pos	Team	Pld	W	D	L	GF	GA	GD	Pts	Qualification or relegation
8	PSS	34	12	12	10	45	42	+3	48	
9	Arema	34	13	7	14	59	62	−3	46	
10	Persija	34	11	11	12	43	42	+1	44 (Note: Head-to-head points: Persija (+2) 8 pts; Persela (+0) 4 pts; PSM (–2) 4 pts.)	
11	Persela	34	11	11	12	47	45	+2	44	
12	PSM	34	13	5	16	50	50	0	44	Qualification for the AFC Cup play-off round (Note: PSM qualified for the AFC Cup play-off round as the 2018–19 Piala Indonesia winners.)

Source: Shopee Liga 1 2019, Soccerway
Rules for classification: 1) Points; 2) Head-to-head; 3) Goal difference; 4) Goals scored; 5) Drawing.

==== Results summary ====
Overall								Home						Away					
Pld	W	D	L	GF	GA	GD	Pts	W	D	L	GF	GA	GD	W	D	L	GF	GA	GD
34	11	11	12	43	42	+1	44	9	4	4	28	16	+12	2	7	8	15	26	−11

Last updated: 22 December 2019.
Source: Competitive matches

==== Results by matchday ====
Matchday	1	2	3	4	5	6	7	8	9	10	11	12	13	14	15	16	17	18	19	20	21	22	23	24	25	26	27	28	29	30	31	32	33	34
Ground	A	A	A	H	A	H	H	H	A	H	A	H	H	A	H	A	H	H	H	H	A	H	A	A	A	H	A	A	H	A	A	H	H	A
Result	D	L	L	W	D	W	D	D	L	L	L	D	D	D	W	D	L	W	L	W	L	W	W	D	L	W	D	D	W	L	L	W	L	W
Position	11	11	16	14	14	13	14	15	17	17	17	17	17	17	14	15	17	15	16	13	14	16	13	13	14	14	12	12	11	11	12	12	13	10

Updated to match(es) played on 22 December 2019. Source: Matches
A = Away; H = Home; W = Win; D = Draw; L = Loss; P = Postponed

==== Matches ====
Win Draw Loss

First round

20 May 2019 1	PS Barito Putera	1–1	Persija Jakarta	Banjarmasin, South Kalimantan
21:30 UTC+8	Rafael 82'	Report	Šimić 37'	Stadium: 17 May Stadium; Attendance: 7,180; Referee: Iwan Sukoco (Malang)

26 May 2019 2	PSIS Semarang	2–1	Persija Jakarta	Magelang, Central Java
20:30 UTC+7	Hari 75', 77'	Report	Ryuji 38'	Stadium: Moch. Soebroto Stadium; Attendance: 15,553; Referee: Yudi Nurcahya (Bandung)

31 May 2019 3	Bali United F.C.	1–0	Persija Jakarta	Gianyar Regency, Bali
20:30 UTC+7	Paulo Sergio 82'	Report		Stadium: Kapten I Wayan Dipta Stadium; Attendance: 16,419; Referee: Dwi Purba Adi Wicaksana (Kudus Regency)

15 June 2019 4 (Postponed)	Persija Jakarta	P-P	Borneo F.C.	Central Jakarta, DKI Jakarta
15.30		Report		Stadium: Gelora Bung Karno Main Stadium
Note: Persija Jakarta hosted Borneo F.C. at Wibawa Mukti Stadium on 11 November 2019. Because 2019 Liga 1 must postpone a gameweek due to a friendly match between Indonesia national football team and Vanuatu national football team at Gelora Bung Karno Main Stadium on 15 June 2019.

22 June 2019 5	Persela Lamongan	0–0	Persija Jakarta	Lamongan Regency, East Java
18:30 UTC+7		Report		Stadium: Surajaya Stadium; Attendance: 16,255; Referee: Faulur Rosy (Banda Aceh)

3 July 2019 6	Persija Jakarta	1-0	PSS Sleman	Bekasi, West Java
15:30 UTC+7	Šimić 25'	Report		Stadium: Patriot Candrabhaga Stadium; Attendance: 28,927; Referee: Yeni Krisdianto (Tulungagung)

6 July 2019 7 (Postponed)	Persija Jakarta	P-P	PSM Makassar	Central Jakarta, DKI Jakarta
15.30		Report		Stadium: Gelora Bung Karno Main Stadium
Note: Persija Jakarta hosted PSM Makassar at Gelora Bung Karno Main Stadium on 28 August 2019 due to the same date schedule with 2018–19 Piala Indonesia semi-finals which Persija Jakarta play against Borneo F.C. and PSM Makassar play against Madura United F.C.

10 July 2019 8	Persija Jakarta	1-1	Persib Bandung	Central Jakarta, DKI Jakarta
15.30	Šimić 75'	Report	Gevorkýan 90+1'	Stadium: Gelora Bung Karno Main Stadium; Attendance: 70,136; Referee: Fariq Hitaba (Yogyakarta)

16 July 2019 9	TIRA-Persikabo	5-3	Persija Jakarta	Cibinong, Bogor Regency, West Java
15.30	Loris Arnaud 8'; Osas Saha 22', 64'; Rifad Marasabessy 43'; Ciro Alves 59'	Report	Šimić 7', 32', 71'	Stadium: Pakansari Stadium; Attendance: 7,637; Referee: Yudi Nurcahya (Bandung)

21 July 2019 10 (Postponed)	Persija Jakarta	P-P	Semen Padang F.C.	Central Jakarta, DKI Jakarta
15.30		Report		Stadium: Gelora Bung Karno Main Stadium
Note: Persija Jakarta hosted Semen Padang F.C. at Patriot Candrabhaga Stadium on 16 October 2019 due to the same date schedule with 2018–19 Piala Indonesia finals first leg which Persija Jakarta against PSM Makassar.

30 July 2019 11 (Postponed)	Persipura Jayapura	P-P	Persija Jakarta	Jayapura City, Papua
15.30		Report		Stadium: Mandala Stadium
Note: Persipura Jayapura hosted Persija Jakarta at Aji Imbut Stadium on 11 September 2019 due to a very close schedule with 2018–19 Piala Indonesia finals second leg which Persija Jakarta against PSM Makassar.

3 August 2019 12	Persija Jakarta	2-2	Arema F.C.	Central Jakarta, DKI Jakarta
15.30	Novri 20'; Šimić 51'	Report	Hanif Sjahbandi 17'; Nur Hardianto 95'	Stadium: Gelora Bung Karno Main Stadium; Attendance: 51,230; Referee: Ikhsan Prasetya Jati (Yogyakarta)

10 August 2019 13	Persija Jakarta	1-1	Bhayangkara F.C.	Bekasi, West Java
15.30	Šimić 28'	Report	Anderson Salles 41'	Stadium: Patriot Candrabhaga Stadium; Attendance: 12,468; Referee: Faulur Rosy (Banda Aceh)

16 August 2019 14	Madura United F.C.	2-2	Persija Jakarta	Pamekasan Regency, East Java
18.30	David Laly 40'; Alfath Fathier 78'	Report	Šimić 19', 50'	Stadium: Gelora Ratu Pamelingan Stadium; Attendance: 3,316; Referee: Ikhsan Prasetya Jati (Yogyakarta)

20 August 2019 15	Persija Jakarta	3-0	Kalteng Putra F.C.	Central Jakarta, DKI Jakarta
15.30	Heri Susanto 13'; Šimić 49'; Sandi Darma Sute 90'	Report		Stadium: Gelora Bung Karno Madya Stadium; Attendance: 4,124; Referee: Oki Dwi Putra Senjaya (Bandung)

24 August 2019 16	Persebaya Surabaya	1-1	Persija Jakarta	Surabaya, East Java
15.30	Šimić 68'	Report	Misbakus Solikin 80'	Stadium: Gelora Bung Tomo Stadium; Attendance: 50,000; Referee: Aprisman Aranda (Padang Panjang)

28 August 2019 7 (Replacement Match)	Persija Jakarta	0-0	PSM Makassar	Central Jakarta, DKI Jakarta
15.30		Report		Stadium: Gelora Bung Karno Main Stadium; Attendance: 16,119; Referee: Yeni Krisdianto (Tulungagung Regency)

1 September 2019 17	Persija Jakarta	0-1	Badak Lampung F.C.	Bekasi, West Java
15.30		Report	Marquinhos 11'	Stadium: Patriot Candrabhaga Stadium; Attendance: 23,269; Referee: Yudi Nurcahya (Bandung)

Second Round

11 September 2019 11 (Replacement Match)	Persipura Jayapura	2-0	Persija Jakarta	Kutai Kartanegara Regency, East Kalimantan
18.30		Report	Gunansar Mandowen 65'; Boaz Solossa 70'	Stadium: Aji Imbut Stadium; Attendance: 404; Referee: Ikhsan Prasetya Jati (Yogyakarta)

15 September 2019 18	Persija Jakarta	2-1	PSIS Semarang	Bekasi, West Java
15.30	Šimić 45'; Šimić 53'	Report	Septian David Maulana 63'	Stadium: Patriot Candrabhaga Stadium; Attendance: 21.030; Referee: Oki Dwi Putra Senjaya (Bandung)

19 September 2019 19	Persija Jakarta	0-1	Bali United F.C.	Bekasi, West Java
15.30		Report	Melvin Platje 72'	Stadium: Patriot Candrabhaga Stadium; Attendance: 13,227; Referee: Dwi Purba Adi Wicaksana (Kudus Regency)

23 September 2019 20	Persija Jakarta	1-0	PS Barito Putera	Bekasi, West Java
15.30	Heri Susanto 53'	Report		Stadium: Patriot Candrabhaga Stadium; Attendance: 5,525; Referee: Hamim Tohari (Lamongan Regency)

27 September 2019 21	Borneo F.C.	1-0	Persija Jakarta	Samarinda, East Kalimantan
18.30	Lerby Eliandry 66'	Report		Stadium: Segiri Stadium; Attendance: 5,117; Referee: Yeni Krisdianto (Tulungagung Regency)

2 October 2019 22	Persija Jakarta	P-P	Persela Lamongan	Cikarang, Bekasi Regency, West Java
15.30		Report		Stadium: Wibawa Mukti Stadium
Note: Persija Jakarta hosted Persela Lamongan at Wibawa Mukti Stadium on 15 November 2019. Because it not getting a crowd permit by the police due to a labor demonstration on 2 October 2019.

16 October 2019 10 (Replacement Match)	Persija Jakarta	1-2	Semen Padang F.C.	Bekasi, West Java
15.30	Šimić 16'	Report	Vendry Mofu 57' Mariando Uropmabin 90'	Stadium: Patriot Candrabhaga Stadium; Attendance: 7,988; Referee: Nendi Rohaendi (Bandung)

20 October 2019 23	PSM Makassar	0-1	Persija Jakarta	Makassar, South Sulawesi
18.30		Report	Šimić 86'	Stadium: Andi Mattalatta Stadium; Attendance: 8,757; Referee: Rully Ruslin Tambuntina (Malang)

24 October 2019 24	PSS Sleman	0-0	Persija Jakarta	Sleman, Special Region of Yogyakarta
18.30		Report		Stadium: Maguwoharjo Stadium; Attendance: 31,155; Referee: Adi Riyanto (Kendal Regency)

28 October 2019 25	Persib Bandung	2-0	Persija Jakarta	Gianyar Regency, Bali
15.30	Frets Butuan 51'; Ezechiel N'Douassel 59'	Report		Stadium: Kapten I Wayan Dipta Stadium; Attendance: 1,030; Referee: Dwi Purba Adi Wicaksana (Kudus Regency)

3 November 2019 26	Persija Jakarta	2-0	TIRA-Persikabo	Bekasi, West Java
15.30	Xandão 52'; Šimić 72'	Report		Stadium: Patriot Candrabhaga Stadium; Attendance: 20,817; Referee: Darma Santoso Gulo (Medan)

7 November 2019 27	Semen Padang F.C.	2-2	Persija Jakarta	Padang, West Sumatra
16.00	Vanderlei Francisco 41'; Mariando Uropmabin 45'	Report	Šimić 17'; Ryuji 59'	Stadium: Haji Agus Salim Stadium; Attendance: 7,200; Referee: Oki Dwi Putra Senjaya (Bandung)

11 November 2019 4 (Replacement Match)	Persija Jakarta	4-2	Borneo F.C.	Cikarang, Bekasi Regency, West Java
15.30	Šimić 20', 39', 50', 67'	Report	Matías Conti 60'; Juan Alsina 69'	Stadium: Wibawa Mukti Stadium; Attendance: 4,194; Referee: Asep Yandis (Karawang Regency)

15 November 2019 22 (Replacement Match)	Persija Jakarta	4-3	Persela Lamongan	Cikarang, Bekasi Regency, West Java
15.30	Šimić 21', 32'; Heri Susanto 50'; Rohit Chand 70'	Report	Kei Hirose 2'; Sugeng Efendi 34'; Delvin Rumbino 43'	Stadium: Wibawa Mukti Stadium; Attendance: 8,019; Referee: Armyn Dwi Suryathin (Palembang)

23 November 2019 28	Arema F.C.	1-1	Persija Jakarta	Malang Regency, East Java
15.30	Šimić 76'	Report	Makan Konaté 87'	Stadium: Kanjuruhan Stadium; Attendance: 40,412; Referee: Ikhsan Prasetya Jati (Yogyakarta)

28 November 2019 29	Persija Jakarta	1-0	Persipura Jayapura	Central Jakarta, DKI Jakarta
18.30	Joan Tomàs Campasol 75'	Report		Stadium: Gelora Bung Karno Main Stadium; Attendance: 59,021; Referee: Iwan Sukoco (Malang)

4 December 2019 30	Bhayangkara F.C.	3-0	Persija Jakarta	South Jakarta, DKI Jakarta
18.30	Adam Alis Setyano 21'; Herman Dzumafo 28'; Lee Yoo-joon 36'	Report		Stadium: PTIK Stadium; Attendance: 500; Referee: Agus Fauzan Arifin (Sleman Regency)

8 December 2019 31	Badak Lampung F.C.	2-0	Persija Jakarta	Bandar Lampung, Lampung
18.15	Arthur Barrios Bonai 53'; Antony Golec 62'	Report		Stadium: Sumpah Pemuda Stadium; Attendance: 13,069; Referee: Yeni Krisdianto (Tulungagung)

13 December 2019 32	Persija Jakarta	4-0	Madura United F.C.	Central Jakarta, DKI Jakarta
18.30	Šimić 21', 29', 45'; Ramdani Lestaluhu 26'	Report		Stadium: Gelora Bung Karno Main Stadium; Attendance: 13,298; Referee: Thoriq Munir Alkatiri (Bandung)

17 December 2019 33	Persija Jakarta	1-2	Persebaya Surabaya	Central Jakarta, DKI Jakarta
18.30	Šimić 30'	Report	Osvaldo Haay 8'; Diogo Campos Gomes 24'	Stadium: Gelora Bung Karno Main Stadium; Attendance: 53,580; Referee: Faulur Rosy (Banda Aceh)

21 December 2019 34	Kalteng Putra F.C.	1-3	Persija Jakarta	Palangka Raya, Central Kalimantan
15.30	Takuya Matsunaga 70'	Report	Xandão 49'; Xandão 87'; Ramdani Lestaluhu 90'	Stadium: Tuah Pahoe Stadium; Attendance: 0 Referee: Annas Apriliandi (Bandung)

=== Piala Indonesia ===
==== First round ====
9 August 2018 1st Round – Zone 5	Persikabo Kabupaten Bogor (3)	0–2	(1) Persija Jakarta	Bantul, Special Region of Yogyakarta
15.30 (UTC+7)		Report	R. Silva 7' (pen.); Osas 82'	Stadium: Sultan Agung Stadium

==== Second round ====
12 December 2018 2nd Round – Zone 3	Bogor F.C. (3)	0–1	(1) Persija Jakarta	Gianyar Regency, Bali
15.15 (UTC+8)		Report	Osas 18'	Stadium: Kapten I Wayan Dipta Stadium; Referee: Bachrul Ulum (Sidoarjo)

==== Third round ====
23 January 2019 3rd Round – West 1 1st Leg	Persija Jakarta (1)	8–2	757 Kepri Jaya F.C. (3)	Bekasi, West Java
15.00 (UTC+7)	Šimić 14', 27', 40', 64', 69'; Matos 36'; Novri 38'; Bambang 87'		Azis 50'; Nanang 56'	Stadium: Patriot Candrabhaga Stadium; Referee: Fariq Hitaba (Yogyakarta)

31 January 2019 3rd Round – West 1 2nd Leg	757 Kepri Jaya F.C. (3)	1–1 (3–9 agg.)	Persija Jakarta (1)	Batam, Riau Islands
15.00 (UTC+7)	Lutfi 42'		Ismed 44'	Stadium: Gelora Citramas Stadium; Referee: Aprisman Aranda (Padangpanjang)

==== Round of 16 ====
17 February 2019 Round of 16 West – 1st Leg	TIRA-Persikabo (1)	2–2	Persija Jakarta (1)	Cibinong, Bogor Regency, West Java
15.00 (UTC+7)	Arnaud 37'; Ciro 44'		Bruno 38', 78' (pen.)	Stadium: Pakansari Stadium; Referee: Aprisman Aranda (Padangpanjang)

21 February 2019 Round of 16 West – 2nd Leg	Persija Jakarta (1)	2–0 (4–2 agg.)	TIRA-Persikabo (1)	Bekasi, West Java
15.00 (UTC+7)	Fitra 2'; Ryuji 73'	Report		Stadium: Patriot Chandrabhaga Stadium; Attendance: 13,825; Referee: Adi Riyanto (Kendal)

==== Quarter-final ====
26 April 2019 Quarter-Finals – 1st Leg	Bali United F.C. (1)	2–1	Persija Jakarta (1)	Gianyar Regency, Bali
16:30 (UTC+8)	Lilipaly 52', 80'	Report	Bambang 85'	Stadium: Kapten I Wayan Dipta Stadium; Referee: Oki Dwi Putra (Bandung)

5 May 2019 Quarter-Finals – 2nd Leg	Persija Jakarta (1)	1–0 ((a)2–2 agg.)	Bali United F.C. (1)	Cikarang, Bekasi Regency, West Java
15.15 (UTC+7)	Ismed 58' (pen.)	Report		Stadium: Wibawa Mukti Stadium; Attendance: 26,291; Referee: Handri Kristanto (Semarang)

==== Semi-final ====
29 June 2019 Semi-Finals – 1st Leg	Persija Jakarta (1)	2–1	Borneo F.C. (1)	Cikarang, Bekasi Regency, West Java
15.30 (UTC+7)	Nasadit 2'; Bambang 90+6'	Report	Terens 38'	Stadium: Wibawa Mukti Stadium; Attendance: 20,033; Referee: Wawan Rapiko (Pekanbaru)

6 July 2019 Semi-Finals – 2nd Leg	Borneo F.C. (1)	1-1 (2-3 agg.)	Persija Jakarta (1)	Samarinda, East Kalimantan
16.30 (UTC+8)	Silva 59'	Report	Ismed 33'	Stadium: Segiri Stadium; Referee: Rully Ruslin Tambutina (Malang Regency)

==== Final ====
21 July 2019 Final – 1st Leg	Persija Jakarta (1)	1-0	PSM Makassar (1)	Central Jakarta, DKI Jakarta
15.30	Ryuji 87'	Report		Stadium: Gelora Bung Karno Main Stadium; Attendance: 70,306; Referee: Dwi Purba Adi Wicaksana (Kudus Regency)

28 July 2019 Final – 2nd Leg (Postponed)	PSM Makassar (1)	P-P	Persija Jakarta (1)	Makassar, South Sulawesi
15.30				Stadium: Andi Mattalatta Stadium
Note: PSM Makassar hosted Persija Jakarta at Andi Mattalatta Stadium on 6 August 2019 due to an attack on the Persija team bus when several players and officials were injured.

6 August 2019 Final – 2nd Leg (Replacement Match)	PSM Makassar (1)	2-0 (2-1 agg.)	Persija Jakarta (1)	Makassar, South Sulawesi
15.30	Evans 3'; Zulham 50'			Stadium: Andi Mattalatta Stadium; Attendance: 15,000; Referee: Fariq Hitaba (Yogyakarta)

=== AFC Champions League ===
==== Qualifying play-offs ====
5 February 2019 Preliminary round 1	Home United FC (Singapore)	1–3	(Indonesia) Persija Jakarta	Kallang, Singapore
19:30 SST	Song 43'	Report	Ho Wai Loon 9' (o.g.); Beto 54'; Šimić 84'	Stadium: Jalan Besar Stadium; Attendance: 1,893; Referee: Yaqoob Abdul Baki (Oman)

12 February 2019 Preliminary round 2	Newcastle Jets (Australia)	3–1 (a.e.t.)	(Indonesia) Persija Jakarta	Newcastle, New South Wales
19:00 AEDT	Vargas 49'; Boogaard 101'; Ridenton 120'	Report	Ramdani 72'	Stadium: Newcastle International Sports Centre; Attendance: 6,647; Referee: Aziz Asimov (Uzbekistan)

=== AFC Cup ===
==== Group stage ====
Pos	Team	Pld	W	D	L	GF	GA	GD	Pts	Qualification
1	(Philippines) Ceres–Negros	6	5	0	1	15	6	+9	15	Zonal semi-finals
2	(Vietnam) Becamex Bình Dương	6	4	1	1	13	5	+8	13	Zonal semi-finals
3	(Indonesia) Persija Jakarta	6	2	1	3	12	9	+3	7	
4	(Myanmar) Shan United	6	0	0	6	5	25	−20	0	

Source: AFC
Rules for classification: Group stage tiebreakers

Win Draw Loss

26 February 2019 Matchday 1	Persija Jakarta (Indonesia)	0–0	(Vietnam) Becamex Bình Dương	Central Jakarta, Indonesia
15:30 UTC+7		Live Report; Stats Report		Stadium: Gelora Bung Karno Main Stadium; Attendance: 35,282; Referee: Mongkolchai Pechsri (Thailand)

12 March 2019 Matchday 2	Shan United (Myanmar)	1–3	(Indonesia) Persija Jakarta	Yangon, Myanmar
15:30 UTC+6:30	Nakamura 14'	Live Report; Stats Report	Bruno Matos 66', 83'; Paulle 77'	Stadium: Thuwunna YTC Stadium; Referee: Sultan Al-Marzooqi (United Arab Emirates)

3 April 2019 Matchday 3	Ceres-Negros (Philippines)	1–0	(Indonesia) Persija Jakarta	Bacolod, Philippines
19:30 UTC+8	Marañón 9'	Live Report; Stats Report		Stadium: Panaad Park and Stadium; Attendance: 5,878; Referee: Vahid Kazemi (Iran)

23 April 2019 Matchday 4	Persija Jakarta (Indonesia)	2–3	(Philippines) Ceres-Negros	Central Jakarta, Indonesia
15:30 UTC+7	Sandi 49'; Matos 57'	Live Report; Stats Report	Tanton 70'; Marañón 85'; Ott 90+2'	Stadium: Gelora Bung Karno Main Stadium; Attendance: 26,923; Referee: Sherzod Kasimov (Uzbekistan)

1 May 2019 Matchday 5	Becamex Bình Dương (Vietnam)	3–1	(Indonesia) Persija Jakarta	Thủ Dầu Một, Vietnam
18:00 UTC+7	Nguyễn Anh Đức 38'; Tô Văn Vũ 45+2'; Luiz 51'	Live Report; Stats Report	Matos 71'	Stadium: Gò Đậu Stadium; Attendance: 2,688; Referee: Minoru Tōjō (Japan)

15 May 2019 Matchday 6	Persija Jakarta (Indonesia)	6–1	(Myanmar) Shan United	Central Jakarta, Indonesia
20:30 UTC+7	Matos 6', 90', 90+2'; Novri 18'; Heri 47'; Riko 57'	Live Report; Stats Report	Zin Min Tun 81'	Stadium: Gelora Bung Karno Main Stadium; Attendance: 8,633; Referee: Nivon Robesh Gamini (Sri Lanka)

== Statistics ==
=== Squad appearances and goals ===
Last updated on 22 December 2019.

No.	Pos	Nat	Player	Total		Liga 1		Piala Indonesia		AFC Champions League		AFC Cup	
No.	Pos	Nat	Player	Apps	Goals	Apps	Goals	Apps	Goals	Apps	Goals	Apps	Goals
Goalkeepers
22	GK	(Indonesia) IDN	Risky Sudirman	0	0	0	0	0	0	0	0	0	0
26	GK	(Indonesia) IDN	Andritany Ardhiyasa	33	0	23	0	3	0	2	0	5	0
29	GK	(Indonesia) IDN	Adixi Lenzivio	0	0	0	0	0	0	0	0	0	0
88	GK	(Indonesia) IDN	Shahar Ginanjar	15	0	11	0	3	0	0	0	1	0
Defenders
2	DF	(Brazil) BRA	Xandão	19	3	19	3	0	0	0	0	0	0
3	DF	(Indonesia) IDN	Dany Saputra	18	0	8	0	3	0	2	0	5	0
4	DF	(Indonesia) IDN	Ryuji Utomo Prabowo	31	4	19	2	6	2	2	0	4	0
6	DF	(Indonesia) IDN	Maman Abdurrahman	29	0	15	0	6	0	2	0	6	0
14	DF	(Indonesia) IDN	Ismed Sofyan	32	3	17	0	7	3	2	0	6	0
16	DF	(Indonesia) IDN	Tony Sucipto	43	0	33	0	6	0	2	0	2	0
19	DF	(Indonesia) IDN	Fachrudin Aryanto	19	0	19	0	0	0	0	0	0	0
28	DF	(Indonesia) IDN	Muhammad Rezaldi Hehanusa	18	0	16	0	2	0	0	0	0	0
40	DF	(Indonesia) IDN	Al Hamra Hehanusa	1	0	1	0	0	0	0	0	0	0
81	DF	(Indonesia) IDN	Adrianus Dwiki Arya Poernomo	3	0	3	0	0	0	0	0	0	0
Midfielders
7	MF	(Indonesia) IDN	Rizki Ramdani Lestaluhu	35	3	23	2	5	0	2	1	5	0
11	MF	(Indonesia) IDN	Novri Setiawan	41	3	28	1	7	1	2	0	4	1
17	MF	(Indonesia) IDN	Fitra Ridwan Salam	22	1	10	0	5	1	2	0	5	0
18	MF	(Spain) ESP	Joan Tomàs Campasol	13	1	13	1	0	0	0	0	0	0
24	MF	(Indonesia) IDN	Resky Fandi Witriawan	2	0	2	0	0	0	0	0	0	0
32	MF	(Nepal) NEP	Rohit Chand	41	2	31	2	4	0	0	0	6	0
41	MF	(Indonesia) IDN	Feby Eka Putra	11	0	9	0	2	0	0	0	0	0
45	MF	(Indonesia) IDN	Sandi Darma Sute	39	2	26	1	6	0	2	0	5	1
99	MF	(Indonesia) IDN	Rachmad Hidayat	11	0	11	0	0	0	0	0	0	0
Forwards
9	FW	(Croatia) CRO	Marko Šimić	40	34	32	28	6	5	2	1	0	0
10	FW	(Indonesia) IDN	Farri Agri	1	0	1	0	0	0	0	0	0	0
20	FW	(Indonesia) IDN	Bambang Pamungkas	23	3	15	0	5	3	0	0	3	0
25	FW	(Indonesia) IDN	Riko Simanjuntak	48	1	32	0	8	0	2	0	6	1
71	FW	(Indonesia) IDN	Sutan Zico	0	0	0	0	0	0	0	0	0	0
90	FW	(Indonesia) IDN	Taufik Hidayat	2	0	2	0	0	0	0	0	0	0
94	FW	(Indonesia) IDN	Heri Susanto	34	4	24	3	5	0	0	0	5	1
Players who have made an appearance or had a squad number this season but have left the club
8	MF	(Indonesia) IDN	Yan Pieter Nasadit	8	1	3	0	3	1	0	0	2	0
10	FW	(Indonesia) IDN	Rudi Widodo	0	0	0	0	0	0	0	0	0	0
10	MF	(Brazil) BRA	Bruno Oliveira de Matos	20	10	7	0	7	3	0	0	6	7
13	FW	(Brazil) BRA	Neguete	2	0	0	0	2	0	0	0	0	0
13	DF	(Indonesia) IDN	Gunawan Dwi Cahyo	0	0	0	0	0	0	0	0	0	0
16	MF	(Indonesia) IDN	Asri Akbar	0	0	0	0	0	0	0	0	0	0
21	FW	(Paraguay) PAR	Sílvio Escobar	4	0	0	0	2	0	0	0	2	0
23	MF	(Indonesia) IDN	Nugroho Fatchurahman	3	0	0	0	1	0	0	0	2	0
70	MF	(Indonesia) IDN	Frengky Kogoya	0	0	0	0	0	0	0	0	0	0
70	MF	(Brazil) BRA	Renan da Silva	0	0	0	0	0	0	0	0	0	0
79	FW	(Indonesia) IDN	Osas Marvelous Ikpefua	0	0	0	0	0	0	0	0	0	0
77	MF	(Uzbekistan) UZB	Jahongir Abdumominov	2	0	0	0	2	0	0	0	0	0
77	MF	(Indonesia) IDN	Yogi Rahadian	5	0	5	0	0	0	0	0	0	0
80	FW	(Indonesia) IDN	Alberto Goncalves da Costa	2	1	0	0	0	0	2	1	0	0
81	DF	(Indonesia) IDN	Vava Yagalo	0	0	0	0	0	0	0	0	0	0
85	DF	(Indonesia) IDN	Michael Yansen Orah	0	0	0	0	0	0	0	0	0	0
86	DF	(France) FRA	Steven Renaud Paulle	9	1	4	0	0	0	0	0	5	1
89	MF	(Indonesia) IDN	Septinus Alua	0	0	0	0	0	0	0	0	0	0

Last updated: 22 December 2019.
Source: Soccerway

=== Top scorers ===
The list is sorted by shirt number when total goals are equal.

Rnk	Pos	No.	Player	Liga 1	Piala Indonesia	Continental	Total
1	FW	9	(Croatia) Marko Šimić	28	5	1	34
2	MF	10	(Brazil) Bruno Matos (Left the club)	0	3	7	10
3	DF	4	(Indonesia) Ryuji Utomo	2	2	0	4
3	FW	94	(Indonesia) Heri Susanto	3	0	1	4
4	DF	2	(Brazil) Xandão	3	0	0	3
4	MF	7	(Indonesia) Ramdani Lestaluhu	2	0	1	3
4	CM	11	(Indonesia) Novri Setiawan	1	2	0	3
4	DF	14	(Indonesia) Ismed Sofyan	0	3	0	3
5	CF	20	(Indonesia) Bambang Pamungkas	0	2	0	2
5	CM	32	(Nepal) Rohit Chand	2	0	0	2
5	CM	45	(Indonesia) Sandi Sute	1	0	1	2
5	MF	8	(Indonesia) Yan Pieter Nasadit (Left the club)	0	1	0	1
5	MF	17	(Indonesia) Fitra Ridwan	0	0	1	1
5	MF	18	(Spain) Joan Tomàs Campasol	1	0	0	1
5	DF	86	(France) Steven Paulle (Left the club)	0	0	1	1
5	FW	80	(Indonesia) Beto Gonçalves (Left the club)	0	0	1	1
5	FW	25	(Indonesia) Riko Simanjuntak	0	0	1	1
5	?	?	Own Goal	0	0	1	1
Total				43	18	16	77

Last updated: 22 December 2019.
Source: Soccerway

=== Top assist ===
The list is sorted by shirt number when total assists are equal.

Rnk	Pos	No.	Player	Liga 1	Piala Indonesia	Continental	Total
1	FW	25	(Indonesia) Riko Simanjuntak	9	2	5	16
2	DF	14	(Indonesia) Ismed Sofyan	3	0	3	6
3	MF	10	(Brazil) Bruno Matos	2	1	1	4
3	MF	45	(Indonesia) Sandi Darma Sute	3	1	0	4
3	FW	94	(Indonesia) Heri Susanto	4	0	0	4
4	MF	32	(Nepal) Rohit Chand	1	0	2	3
5	FW	9	(Croatia) Marko Šimić	2	0	0	2
5	MF	11	(Indonesia) Novri Setiawan	1	0	1	2
5	MF	41	(Indonesia) Feby Eka Putra	1	1	0	2
5	FW	99	(Indonesia) Rachmad Hidayat	2	0	0	2
6	MF	7	(Indonesia) Ramdani Lestaluhu	0	1	0	1
Total				28	6	12	46

Last updated: 22 December 2019.
Source: Liga 1

=== Clean sheets ===
The list is sorted by shirt number when total clean sheets are equal.

Rnk	No.	Player	Liga 1	Piala Indonesia	Continental	Total
1	26	(Indonesia) Andritany Ardhiyasa	8	1	1	10
2	88	(Indonesia) Shahar Ginanjar	2	2	0	4
3	22	(Indonesia) Risky Sudirman	0	0	0	0
3	29	(Indonesia) Adixi Lenzivio	0	0	0	0
Total			10	3	1	14

Last updated: 22 December 2019.
Source: Soccerway

=== Disciplinary record ===
Includes all competitive matches. Players listed below made at least one appearance for Persija Jakarta first squad during the season.

Rnk	Pos.	No.	Nat.	Name	Liga 1			Piala Indonesia			Continental			Total			Grand Total	Notes
Rnk	Pos.	No.	Nat.	Name	Yellow card	Second yellow card	Red card	Yellow card	Second yellow card	Red card	Yellow card	Second yellow card	Red card	Yellow card	Second yellow card	Red card	Grand Total	Notes
1	DF	4	(Indonesia)	Ryuji Utomo	6	1	0	0	0	0	4	0	0	10	1	0	11	
1	MF	45	(Indonesia)	Sandi Darma Sute	8	1	0	0	0	1	1	0	0	9	1	1	11	
2	MF	7	(Indonesia)	Ramdani Lestaluhu	4	0	0	0	0	0	2	0	0	6	0	0	6	
3	DF	14	(Indonesia)	Ismed Sofyan	4	0	0	0	0	0	1	0	0	5	0	0	5	
3	DF	16	(Indonesia)	Tony Sucipto	5	0	0	0	0	0	0	0	0	5	0	0	5	
3	FW	25	(Indonesia)	Riko Simanjuntak	5	0	0	0	0	0	0	0	0	5	0	0	5	
3	MF	32	(Nepal)	Rohit Chand	4	0	0	0	0	0	1	0	0	5	0	0	5	
4	DF	2	(Brazil)	Xandão	4	0	0	0	0	0	0	0	0	4	0	0	4	
4	DF	19	(Indonesia)	Fachrudin Aryanto	4	0	0	0	0	0	0	0	0	4	0	0	4	
4	DF	28	(Indonesia)	Rezaldi Hehanusa	4	0	0	0	0	0	0	0	0	4	0	0	4	
5	DF	6	(Indonesia)	Maman Abdurrahman	2	0	0	0	0	0	1	0	0	3	0	0	3	
5	MF	11	(Indonesia)	Novri Setiawan	2	0	1	0	0	0	0	0	0	2	0	1	3	
5	MF	99	(Indonesia)	Rachmad Hidayat	3	0	0	0	0	0	0	0	0	1	0	0	3	
6	MF	41	(Indonesia)	Feby Eka Putra	2	0	0	0	0	0	0	0	0	2	0	0	2	
6	DF	86	(France)	Steven Paulle	0	0	0	0	0	0	2	0	0	2	0	0	2	Left the club
6	FW	94	(Indonesia)	Heri Susanto	2	0	0	0	0	0	0	0	0	2	0	0	2	
7	FW	9	(Croatia)	Marko Šimić	1	0	0	0	0	0	0	0	0	1	0	0	1	
7	FW	20	(Indonesia)	Bambang Pamungkas	1	0	0	0	0	0	0	0	0	1	0	0	1	

Last updated: 22 December 2019
Source: Competitions
Only competitive matches
(yellow card) = Number of bookings; (second yellow card) = Number of sending offs after a second yellow card; (red card) = Number of sending offs by a direct red card.

=== Summary ===
Games played	52 (34 Liga 1 10 Piala Indonesia, 2 AFC Champions League, 6 AFC Cup)
Games won	19 (11 Liga 1 5 Piala Indonesia, 1 AFC Champions League, 2 AFC Cup)
Games drawn	15 (11 Liga 1 3 Piala Indonesia, 0 AFC Champions League, 1 AFC Cup)
Games lost	18 (12 Liga 1 2 Piala Indonesia, 1 AFC Champions League, 3 AFC Cup)
Goals scored	77 (43 Liga 1 18 Piala Indonesia, 4 AFC Champions League, 12 AFC Cup)
Goals conceded	66 (42 Liga 1 11 Piala Indonesia, 4 AFC Champions League, 9 AFC Cup)
Goal difference	+11
Clean sheets	14 (10 Liga 1, 3 Piala Indonesia, 0 AFC Champions League, 1 AFC Cup)
Yellow cards	73
Red cards	3
Most appearances	48 (Riko Simanjuntak)
Top scorer	34 (Marko Šimić)
Top assist	16 (Riko Simanjuntak)
Winning Percentage	19/52 (36.53%)

Last updated: 22 December 2019.
Source: Liga 1
