= 2020–21 Persija Jakarta season =

Persija Jakarta
2020–21 season
- Owner: PT Persija Jaya Jakarta
- President: Mohamad Prapanca
- Head Coach: (Brazil) Sergio Farias
- Stadium: Gelora Bung Karno Main Stadium
Home colours	Away colours	Third colours

The 2020–21 season is Persija's 87th competitive season. They have not been relegated since the competition started in 1933. This season is Persija's 26th consecutive seasons in top-flight since professional competition formed on 1994. Along with Liga 1, the club will compete in 2020 Piala Indonesia. The season covers the period from 1 January 2020 to 28 February 2021.

== Coaching staff ==
Position	Staff
First-team Coach	(Brazil) Sergio Farias
Assistant Coach	(Brazil) Rodrigo Pellegrino
Physical Coach	(Brazil) Stefano Impagliazzo
Assistant Coach	(Indonesia) Sudirman
Goalkeeper Coach	(Indonesia) Ahmad Fauzi
Masseur	(Indonesia) Aditya Julistiawan (Indonesia) Akhmad Aditya Subkhi
Team Doctor	(Indonesia) Donny Kurniawan
Kitman	(Indonesia) Abdul Rahman Saleh

=== Management ===
Chief Executive Officer	(Indonesia) Mohammad Prapanca
Financial Director	(Indonesia) Koko Afiat
Sporting Director	(Indonesia) Ferry Paulus
Marketing Director	(Indonesia) Andhika Suksmana
Manager	(Indonesia) Bambang Pamungkas
Assistant Manager	(Indonesia) Abel Anmas
Match Organizing Committee	(Indonesia) Haen Rahmawan
Club Secretary	(Indonesia) Edy Syahputra
Media Officer	(Indonesia)
Ground (capacity and dimensions)	Gelora Bung Karno (76,127 / 105x68 metres)
Training Ground	Lapangan Sutasoma 77

== New contracts ==
No.	Pos	Player/Staff	Contract length	Contract end	Date	Source
26	GK	(Indonesia) Andritany Ardhiyasa	TBA	TBA	23 December 2019	
88	GK	(Indonesia) Shahar Ginanjar	TBA	TBA	23 December 2019	
4	DF	(Indonesia) Ryuji Utomo Prabowo	TBA	TBA	23 December 2019	
14	DF	(Indonesia) Ismed Sofyan	TBA	TBA	23 December 2019	
28	DF	(Indonesia) Muhammad Rezaldi Hehanusa	TBA	TBA	23 December 2019	
45	MF	(Indonesia) Sandi Darma Sute	TBA	TBA	23 December 2019	
7	MF	(Indonesia) Rizki Ramdani Lestaluhu	TBA	TBA	23 December 2019	
16	DF	(Indonesia) Tony Sucipto	TBA	TBA	23 December 2019	
25	MF	(Indonesia) Riko Simanjuntak	TBA	TBA	23 December 2019	
41	MF	(Indonesia) Feby Eka Putra	TBA	TBA	23 December 2019	
11	MF	(Indonesia) Novri Setiawan	TBA	TBA	23 December 2019	
94	FW	(Indonesia) Heri Susanto	TBA	TBA	23 December 2019	
22	GK	(Indonesia) Rizky Sudirman	TBA	TBA	23 December 2019	
		(Indonesia) Braif Fatari	TBA	TBA	23 December 2019	
40	DF	(Indonesia) Al Hamra Hehanussa	TBA	TBA	23 December 2019	
24	MF	(Indonesia) Resky Fandi Witriawan	TBA	TBA	23 December 2019	
81	DF	(Indonesia) Adrianus Dwiki Arya Poernomo	TBA	TBA	23 December 2019	
90	FW	(Indonesia) Taufik Hidayat	TBA	TBA	23 December 2019	
9	FW	(Croatia) Marko Šimić	3 year	1 January 2023	25 December 2019	
32	CM	(Nepal) Rohit Chand Thakuri	1 year	9 January 2021	10 January 2020	
6	DF	(Indonesia) Maman Abdurrahman	1 year	21 January 2021	22 January 2020	

== Transfers ==
=== In ===
No.	Pos	Player	Transferred From	Fee	Date	Source
66	LB	(Indonesia) Alfath Faathier	(Indonesia) Madura United F.C.	Free	30 December 2019	
5	CB	(Indonesia) Otávio Dutra	(Indonesia) Persebaya Surabaya	Free	1 January 2020	
99	ST	(Indonesia) Muhammad Rafli Mursalim	(Indonesia) Mitra Kutai Kartanegara	Free	2 January 2020	
6	CM	(Indonesia) Evan Dimas Darmono	(Indonesia) PS Barito Putera	Free	11 January 2020	
10	CM	(Netherlands) Marc Anthony Klok	(Indonesia) PSM Makassar	Undisclosed	31 January 2020	
47	LB	(Italy) Marco Motta	Free Agent	Free	3 February 2020	
46	LM	(Indonesia) Osvaldo Ardiles Haay	(Indonesia) Persebaya Surabaya	Free	10 February 2020	
90	LB	(Indonesia) Rinto Ali	(Indonesia) Cilegon United F.C.	Free	10 February 2020	

=== Out ===
No.	Pos	Player	Transferred To	Fee	Date	Source
20	ST	(Indonesia) Bambang Pamungkas	-	Retired	17 December 2019	
3	LB	(Indonesia) Dany Saputra	(Indonesia) Persik Kediri	Released	27 December 2019	
17	CM	(Indonesia) Fitra Ridwan Salam	(Indonesia) PSS Sleman	Released	27 December 2019	
99	AM	(Indonesia) Rachmad Hidayat	(Indonesia) PSMS Medan	Released	27 December 2019	
10	AM	(Indonesia) Syaffarizal Mursalin Agri	Free Agent	Released	29 December 2019	
18	AM	(Spain) Joan Tomàs Campasol	Free Agent	Released	29 December 2019	
2	CB	(Brazil) Xandão	Free Agent	Released	29 December 2019	
19	CB	(Indonesia) Fachruddin Wahyudi Ariyanto	(Indonesia) Madura United F.C.	End of Loan	31 December 2019	

=== Loan In ===
No.	Pos	Player	Loaned From	Start	End	Source

=== Loan Out ===
No.	Pos	Player	Loaned to	Start	End	Source
41	LW	(Indonesia) Feby Eka Putra	(Indonesia) Arema F.C.	26 February 2020	31 December 2020	
42	MF	(Indonesia) Fadil Redian	(Indonesia) Perserang Serang	26 February 2020	31 December 2020	
90	LB	(Indonesia) Rinto Ali	(Indonesia) Cilegon United F.C.	26 February 2020	31 December 2020	
4	CB	(Indonesia) Ryuji Utomo Prabowo	(Malaysia) Penang F.C.	1 December 2020	31 December 2021	

== Squad information ==
=== First team squad ===
No.	Name	Nat.	Date of Birth (Age)	Signed in	Contract until	Signed from	Transfer Fee	Notes
Goalkeepers
22	Risky Sudirman	(Indonesia)	2 February 2002 (age 24)	2019		?		Under-23 Player; Originally from Youth system
26	Andritany Ardhiyasa	(Indonesia)	26 December 1991 (age 34)	2010	2020	(Indonesia) Sriwijaya	?	Captain
29	Adixi Lenzivio	(Indonesia)	29 September 1993 (age 33)	2019	2019	?	?	Originally from Youth system
88	Shahar Ginanjar	(Indonesia)	4 November 1990 (age 36)	2019	2022	(Indonesia) PSM Makassar	Free	
Defenders
5	Otávio Dutra	(Indonesia)	22 November 1983 (age 42)	2020	2021	(Indonesia) Persebaya Surabaya	Free	Naturalized Player
14	Ismed Sofyan	(Indonesia)	28 August 1979 (age 47)	2003	2020	(Indonesia) Persijatim Jakarta Timur	?	Vice Captain
16	Tony Sucipto	(Indonesia)	12 February 1986 (age 40)	2019	2019	(Indonesia) Persib Bandung	?	
28	Muhammad Rezaldi Hehanusa	(Indonesia)	7 November 1995 (age 31)	2016	2019	(Indonesia) Persitangsel Tangerang Selatan	?	
40	Al Hamra Hehanusa	(Indonesia)	20 July 1999 (age 27)	2019		?	?	Under-23 Player; Originally from Youth system
47	Marco Motta	(Italy)	14 May 1986 (age 40)	2020	2021	(Cyprus) AC Omonia	Free	Foreign Player
56	Maman Abdurrahman	(Indonesia)	12 May 1982 (age 44)	2015	2021	(Indonesia) Persita Tangerang	?	
66	Alfath Faathier	(Indonesia)	28 May 1996 (age 30)	2020	2023	(Indonesia) Madura United F.C.	Free	?
81	Adrianus Dwiki Arya Poernomo	(Indonesia)	1 May 2000 (age 26)	2019		?	?	Under-23 Player; Originally from Youth system
Midfielders
6	Evan Dimas Darmono	(Indonesia)	13 March 1995 (age 31)	2020	2020	(Indonesia) PS Barito Putera	Free	
7	Rizki Ramdani Lestaluhu	(Indonesia)	5 November 1991 (age 35)	2014	2019	(Indonesia) Sriwijaya	?	Originally from Youth system 2nd Vice Captain
10	Marc Anthony Klok	(Netherlands)	20 April 1993 (age 33)	2020	2024	(Indonesia) PSM Makassar	Undisclosed	Foreign Player
11	Novri Setiawan	(Indonesia)	11 November 1993 (age 32)	2014		(Indonesia) Persebaya Surabaya	?	
24	Resky Fandi Witriawan	(Indonesia)	1 February 1999 (age 27)	2019		(Indonesia) Semen Padang	Free	Under-23 Player; Originally from Youth system
32	Rohit Chand Thakuri	(Nepal)	1 March 1992 (age 27)	2017		(Nepal) Manang Marshyangdi Club	Free	Foreign Player
39	Sandi Darma Sute	(Indonesia)	20 September 1992 (age 34)	2017	2019	(Indonesia) Borneo	?	
46	Osvaldo Ardiles Haay	(Indonesia)	17 May 1997 (age 29)	2020	2021	(Indonesia) Persebaya Surabaya	Free	Under-23 Player
61	Alief Ramadhian	(Indonesia)	?	2020		?	?	Under-23 Player; Originally from Youth system
80	Braif Fatari	(Indonesia)	9 April 2002 (age 24)	2019		?	?	Under-23 Player; Originally from Youth system
Forwards
9	Marko Šimić	(Croatia)	23 January 1989 (age 37)	2017	2022	(Malaysia) Melaka United	?	Foreign Player
25	Riko Simanjuntak	(Indonesia)	26 January 1992 (age 34)	2018	2019	(Indonesia) Semen Padang	Free	
71	Sutan Zico	(Indonesia)	7 April 2002 (age 24)	2019	?	?	?	Under-23 Player; Originally from Youth system
98	Taufik Hidayat	(Indonesia)	16 December 1999 (age 26)	2019	?	(Indonesia) Sriwijaya F.C.	Free	Under-23 Player
94	Heri Susanto	(Indonesia)	15 July 1994 (age 32)	2019	2021	(Indonesia) PSM Makassar	Free	
99	Muhammad Rafli Mursalim	(Indonesia)	5 March 1999 (age 27)	2020	2023	(Indonesia) Mitra Kutai Kartanegara	Free	Under-23 Player

== Pre-season ==
Win Draw Loss

=== Friendly Matches ===
1 February 2020 Friendly	Persija Jakarta	4–0	KS Tiga Naga	East Jakarta, DKI Jakarta
15.30 (UTC+7)	Taufik; Ryuji; Riko; Hamra	Report		Stadium: Sutasoma Field Stadium

23 February 2020 Friendly	Persija Jakarta	3-1	(Singapore) Geylang International FC	Central Jakarta, DKI Jakarta
20.30 (UTC+7)	Osvaldo 7'; Šimić 50'; Heri 82'		Linardos 69' (pen.)	Stadium: Gelora Bung Karno Main Stadium; Referee: Nusur Fadillah (Jakarta)

=== 2020 East Java Governor's Cup ===
==== Group stage ====
Tables

Pos	Team	Pld	W	D	L	GF	GA	GD	Pts	Status
1	Persija Jakarta (Q)	3	2	1	0	7	2	+5	7	Qualified to Semifinals
2	Arema F.C. (Q)	3	2	1	0	6	2	+4	7	Qualified to Semifinals
3	Sabah FA (E)	3	0	1	2	2	6	−4	1	Eliminated
4	Persela Lamongan (E)	3	0	1	2	4	9	−5	1	Eliminated

Rules for classification: 1) Points; 2) Goal difference; 3) Number of goals scored
(E) Eliminated; (Q) Qualified for the phase indicated

Matches

11 February 2020 2020 East Java Governor's Cup Group B	Persija Jakarta	4-1	Persela Lamongan	Kepanjen, Malang Regency, East Java
15:30 (UTC+7)	Šimić 19', 60' (pen.), 90'; Novri 29'	Report	Rafinha 37'	Stadium: Kanjuruhan Stadium; Referee: Oki Dwi Putra Senjaya (Bandung)

13 February 2020 2020 East Java Governor's Cup Group B	Sabah FA (Malaysia)	0-2	Persija Jakarta	Kepanjen, Malang Regency, East Java
15:30 (UTC+7)		Report	Šimić 36' (pen.); Rohit 52'	Stadium: Kanjuruhan Stadium; Referee: Iwan Sukoco (Malang)

15 February 2020 2020 East Java Governor's Cup Group B	Arema F.C.	1-1	Persija Jakarta	Kepanjen, Malang Regency, East Java
19:00 (UTC+7)	Johan 81'	Report	Riko 22'	Stadium: Kanjuruhan Stadium; Referee: Dwi Purba Adi Wicaksana (Kudus)

==== Knockout Phase ====
===== Semifinal =====
17 February 2020 2020 East Java Governor's Cup Semifinal	Persija Jakarta	2-1	Madura United F.C.	Kepanjen, Malang Regency, East Java
19:00 (UTC+7)	Šimić 4'; Novri 57'		Greg 72'	Stadium: Kanjuruhan Stadium; Attendance: 0 Referee: Oki Dwi Putra Senjaya (Bandung)

===== Final =====
20 February 2020 2020 East Java Governor's Cup Final	Persebaya Surabaya	4-1	Persija Jakarta	Sidoarjo, East Java
15:30 (UTC+7)	Oktafianus 4'; Konate 52'; Ricky 56'; Eid 80'		Šimić 43'	Stadium: Gelora Delta Stadium; Referee: Dwi Purba Adi Wicaksana (Kudus)

== Competitions ==
=== Overview ===
Competition	Record								Started round	Final position / round	First match	Last match
Competition	G	W	D	L	GF	GA	GD	Win %	Started round	Final position / round	First match	Last match
Liga 1	2	1	1	0	5	4	+1	50.00	—	Not Started Yet	1 March 2020	31 October 2020
Piala Indonesia	—	−	−	−	−	−	—	—	First Round — Zone 5	Not Started Yet	TBA	TBA
Total	2	1	1	0	5	4	+1	50.00				

Updated to match played 14 March 2020
Source: Competitions

=== Liga 1 ===

Persija XI Shopee Liga 1 2020

==== League table ====
Pos	Team	Pld	W	D	L	GF	GA	GD	Pts
7	Persiraja	3	1	2	0	1	0	+1	5
8	Madura United	3	1	1	1	5	3	+2	4
9	Persija	2	1	1	0	5	4	+1	4
10	TIRA-Persikabo	3	1	1	1	3	3	0	4
11	Bhayangkara	3	0	3	0	3	3	0	3

Source: Shopee Liga 1 2020, Soccerway
Rules for classification: 1) Points; 2) Head-to-head; 3) Goal difference; 4) Goals scored; 5) Drawing.

==== Results summary ====
Overall								Home						Away					
Pld	W	D	L	GF	GA	GD	Pts	W	D	L	GF	GA	GD	W	D	L	GF	GA	GD
2	1	1	0	5	4	+1	4	1	0	0	3	2	+1	0	1	0	2	2	0

Last updated: 14 March 2020.
Source: Competitive matches

==== Results by matchday ====
Matchday	1	2	3	4	5	6	7	8	9	10	11	12	13	14	15	16	17	18	19	20	21	22	23	24	25	26	27	28	29	30	31	32	33	34
Ground	H	H	A	H	H	A	H	A	H	A	H	A	H	A	H	A	A	A	A	H	A	A	H	A	H	A	H	A	H	A	H	A	H	H
Result	W	P	D																															
Position	5	6	9																															

Source: Matches
A = Away; H = Home; W = Win; D = Draw; L = Loss; P = Postponed

==== Matches ====
Win Draw Loss

First round

1 March 2020 1	Persija Jakarta	3-2	Borneo F.C.	Central Jakarta, DKI Jakarta
15:30 UTC+7	Osvaldo 21'; Šimić 36'; Evan 85'	Report	Torres 71'; Ryuji 90+3' (o.g.)	Stadium: Gelora Bung Karno Main Stadium; Attendance: 50,826; Referee: Sance Lawita (Manado)

7 March 2020 2 (Postponed)	Persija Jakarta	P-P	Persebaya Surabaya	Central Jakarta, DKI Jakarta
18:30 UTC+7		Report		Stadium: Gelora Bung Karno Main Stadium
Note: Match was postponed from its original date of 7 March due to concerns over the coronavirus pandemic.

14 March 2020 3	Bhayangkara F.C.	2-2	Persija Jakarta	South Jakarta, DKI Jakarta
18:30 UTC+7	Renan 20'; N'Douassel 69'	Report	Dutra 52'; Evan 64'	Stadium: PTIK Stadium; Attendance: 0 Referee: Rully Ruslin Tambuntina (Malang)
Note: The match between Bhayangkara F.C. and Persija Jakarta in PTIK Stadium was played behind closed doors due to a pandemic of COVID-19 in Indonesia.

3 October 2020 4	Persipura Jayapura	v	Persija Jakarta	Malang, East Java
20:30 UTC+7				Stadium: Gajayana Stadium (Note: Stadium that will be used for games under closed doors.); Attendance: 0

9 October 2020 5	Persija Jakarta	v	Persiraja Banda Aceh	Bantul, Special Region of Yogyakarta
20:30 UTC+7				Stadium: Sultan Agung Stadium; Attendance: 0

13 October 2020 6	Persija Jakarta	v	Persik Kediri	Bantul, Special Region of Yogyakarta
18:15 UTC+7				Stadium: Sultan Agung Stadium; Attendance: 0

18 October 2020 7	Persija Jakarta	v	Persela Lamongan	Bantul, Special Region of Yogyakarta
20:30 UTC+7				Stadium: Sultan Agung Stadium; Attendance: 0

23 October 2020 8	Arema F.C.	v	Persija Jakarta	Malang Regency, East Java
20:30 UTC+7				Stadium: Kanjuruhan Stadium; Attendance: 0

27 October 2020 9	Persija Jakarta	v	PSS Sleman	Bantul, Special Region of Yogyakarta
18:15 UTC+7				Stadium: Sultan Agung Stadium; Attendance: 0

31 October 2020 10	Persita Tangerang	v	Persija Jakarta	Tangerang, Banten
20:30 UTC+7				Stadium: Benteng Taruna Stadium; Attendance: 0

4 November 2020 11	PS Barito Putera	v	Persija Jakarta	Sleman, Special Region of Yogyakarta
18:30 UTC+7				Stadium: Maguwoharjo Stadium; Attendance: 0

8 November 2020 12	Persija Jakarta	v	Madura United F.C.	Bantul, Special Region of Yogyakarta
18:30 UTC+7				Stadium: Sultan Agung Stadium; Attendance: 0

13 November 2020 13	Persija Jakarta	v	Bali United F.C.	Bantul, Special Region of Yogyakarta
20:30 UTC+7				Stadium: Sultan Agung Stadium; Attendance: 0

18 November 2020 14	PSM Makassar	v	Persija Jakarta	Bantul, Special Region of Yogyakarta
18:30 UTC+7				Stadium: Sultan Agung Stadium; Attendance: 0

22 November 2020 15	Persija Jakarta	v	TIRA-Persikabo	Bantul, Special Region of Yogyakarta
20:30 UTC+7				Stadium: Sultan Agung Stadium; Attendance: 0

28 November 2020 16	Persib Bandung	v	Persija Jakarta	Bandung, West Java
20:30 UTC+7				Stadium: Gelora Bandung Lautan Api Stadium; Attendance: 0

2 December 2020 2 (Replacement Match)	Persija Jakarta	v	Persebaya Surabaya	Bantul, Special Region of Yogyakarta
20:30 UTC+7				Stadium: Sultan Agung Stadium

6 December 2020 17	PSIS Semarang	v	Persija Jakarta	Semarang, Central Java
20:30 UTC+7				Stadium: Citarum Stadium (Note: PSIS will play their home matches at Citarum because the rebuilding of their stadium at Jatidiri isn't finished yet.); Attendance: 0

Second round

11 December 2020 18	Borneo F.C.	v	Persija Jakarta	Sleman, Special Region of Yogyakarta
17:45 UTC+7				Stadium: Maguwoharjo Stadium; Attendance: 0

16 December 2020 19	Persebaya Surabaya	v	Persija Jakarta	Sidoarjo Regency, East Java
18:30 UTC+7				Stadium: Gelora Delta Stadium; Attendance: 0

20 December 2020 20	Persija Jakarta	v	Bhayangkara F.C.	Bantul, Special Region of Yogyakarta
20:30 UTC+7				Stadium: Sultan Agung Stadium; Attendance: 0

30 December 2020 21	Persik Kediri	v	Persija Jakarta	Kediri, East Java
19:00 UTC+7				Stadium: Brawijaya Stadium; Attendance: 0

5 January 2021 22	Persiraja Banda Aceh	v	Persija Jakarta	Sleman, Special Region of Yogyakarta
18:30 UTC+7				Stadium: Maguwoharjo Stadium; Attendance: 0

9 January 2021 23	Persija Jakarta	v	Persipura Jayapura	Bantul, Special Region of Yogyakarta
20:30 UTC+7				Stadium: Sultan Agung Stadium; Attendance: 0

13 January 2021 24	Persela Lamongan	v	Persija Jakarta	Lamongan Regency, East Java
18:30 UTC+7				Stadium: Surajaya Stadium; Attendance: 0

17 January 2021 25	Persija Jakarta	v	Arema F.C.	Bantul, Special Region of Yogyakarta
20:30 UTC+7				Stadium: Sultan Agung Stadium; Attendance: 0

22 January 2021 26	PSS Sleman	v	Persija Jakarta	Sleman, Special Region of Yogyakarta
20:30 UTC+7				Stadium: Maguwoharjo Stadium; Attendance: 0

26 January 2021 27	Persija Jakarta	v	Persita Tangerang	Bantul, Special Region of Yogyakarta
20:30 UTC+7				Stadium: Sultan Agung Stadium; Attendance: 0

30 January 2021 28	Persija Jakarta	v	PS Barito Putera	Bantul, Special Region of Yogyakarta
20:30 UTC+7				Stadium: Sultan Agung Stadium; Attendance: 0

3 February 2021 29	Madura United F.C.	v	Persija Jakarta	Sidoarjo Regency, East Java
18:30 UTC+7				Stadium: Gelora Delta Stadium; Attendance: 0

7 February 2021 30	Bali United F.C.	v	Persija Jakarta	Bantul, Special Region of Yogyakarta
20:30 UTC+7				Stadium: Sultan Agung Stadium; Attendance: 0

11 February 2021 31	Persija Jakarta	v	PSM Makassar	Bantul, Special Region of Yogyakarta
20:30 UTC+7				Stadium: Sultan Agung Stadium; Attendance: 0

15 February 2021 32	TIRA-Persikabo	v	Persija Jakarta	Cibinong, Bogor Regency, West Java
18:30 UTC+7				Stadium: Pakansari Stadium; Attendance: 0

20 February 2021 33	Persija Jakarta	v	Persib Bandung	Bantul, Special Region of Yogyakarta
20:30 UTC+7				Stadium: Sultan Agung Stadium; Attendance: 0

28 February 2021 34	Persija Jakarta	v	PSIS Semarang	Bantul, Special Region of Yogyakarta
--:-- UTC+7				Stadium: Sultan Agung Stadium; Attendance: 0

=== Piala Indonesia ===
==== First round ====
v

==== Second round ====
v

==== Third round ====
v

v

==== Round of 16 ====
v

v

==== Quarter-final ====
v

v

==== Semi-final ====
v

v

==== Final ====
v

v

== Statistics ==
=== Squad appearances and goals ===
Last updated on 14 March 2020.

No.	Pos	Nat	Player	Total		Liga 1		Piala Indonesia	
No.	Pos	Nat	Player	Apps	Goals	Apps	Goals	Apps	Goals
Goalkeepers
22	GK	(Indonesia) IDN	Risky Sudirman	0	0	0	0	0	0
26	GK	(Indonesia) IDN	Andritany Ardhiyasa	2	0	2	0	0	0
29	GK	(Indonesia) IDN	Adixi Lenzivio	0	0	0	0	0	0
88	GK	(Indonesia) IDN	Shahar Ginanjar	0	0	0	0	0	0
Defenders
5	DF	(Indonesia) IDN	Otávio Dutra	1	1	1	1	0	0
14	DF	(Indonesia) IDN	Ismed Sofyan	0	0	0	0	0	0
16	DF	(Indonesia) IDN	Tony Sucipto	1	0	0+1	0	0	0
28	DF	(Indonesia) IDN	Muhammad Rezaldi Hehanusa	2	0	2	0	0	0
40	DF	(Indonesia) IDN	Al Hamra Hehanusa	0	0	0	0	0	0
47	DF	(Italy) ITA	Marco Motta	2	0	2	0	0	0
56	DF	(Indonesia) IDN	Maman Abdurrahman	1	0	1	0	0	0
66	DF	(Indonesia) IDN	Alfath Faathier	0	0	0	0	0	0
Midfielders
6	MF	(Indonesia) IDN	Evan Dimas Darmono	2	2	1+1	2	0	0
7	MF	(Indonesia) IDN	Rizki Ramdani Lestaluhu	1	0	0+1	0	0	0
10	MF	(Netherlands) NED	Marc Anthony Klok	2	0	2	0	0	0
11	MF	(Indonesia) IDN	Novri Setiawan	1	0	0+1	0	0	0
24	MF	(Indonesia) IDN	Resky Fandi Witriawan	0	0	0	0	0	0
32	MF	(Nepal) NEP	Rohit Chand	2	0	2	0	0	0
39	MF	(Indonesia) IDN	Sandi Darma Sute	1	0	1	0	0	0
46	MF	(Indonesia) IDN	Osvaldo Ardiles Haay	2	1	2	1	0	0
61	MF	(Indonesia) IDN	Alief Ramadhian	0	0	0	0	0	0
81	MF	(Indonesia) IDN	Adrianus Dwiki Arya Poernomo	1	0	0+1	0	0	0
Forwards
9	FW	(Croatia) CRO	Marko Šimić	2	1	2	1	0	0
25	FW	(Indonesia) IDN	Riko Simanjuntak	2	0	2	0	0	0
98	FW	(Indonesia) IDN	Taufik Hidayat	0	0	0	0	0	0
94	FW	(Indonesia) IDN	Heri Susanto	0	0	0	0	0	0
99	FW	(Indonesia) IDN	Muhammad Rafli Mursalim	0	0	0	0	0	0
Players have left the club
4	DF	(Indonesia) IDN	Ryuji Utomo Prabowo	2	0	2	0	0	0

Last updated: 14 March 2020.
Source: Soccerway

=== Top scorers ===
The list is sorted by shirt number when total goals are equal.

Rnk	Pos	No.	Player	Liga 1	Piala Indonesia	Total
1	CM	6	(Indonesia) Evan Dimas Darmono	2	0	2
2	CB	5	(Indonesia) Otávio Dutra	1	0	1
2	CF	9	(Croatia) Marko Šimić	1	0	1
2	LW	46	(Indonesia) Osvaldo Ardiles Haay	1	0	1
Total				5	0	5

Last updated: 14 March 2020.
Source: Soccerway

=== Top assist ===
The list is sorted by shirt number when total assists are equal.

Rnk	Pos	No.	Player	Liga 1	Piala Indonesia	Total
1	RW	25	(Indonesia) Riko Simanjuntak	2	0	2
2	RW	11	(Indonesia) Novri Setiawan	1	0	1
2	LB	28	(Indonesia) Muhammad Rezaldi Hehanussa	1	0	1
Total				4	0	4

Last updated: 14 March 2020.
Source: Liga 1

=== Clean sheets ===
The list is sorted by shirt number when total clean sheets are equal.

Rnk	No.	Player	Liga 1	Piala Indonesia	Total
1			0	0	0
Total			0	0	0

Last updated: 14 March 2020.
Source: Soccerway

=== Disciplinary record ===
Includes all competitive matches. Players listed below made at least one appearance for Persija Jakarta first squad during the season.

Rnk	Pos.	No.	Nat.	Name	Liga 1			Piala Indonesia			Total			Grand Total	Notes
Rnk	Pos.	No.	Nat.	Name	Yellow card	Second yellow card	Red card	Yellow card	Second yellow card	Red card	Yellow card	Second yellow card	Red card	Grand Total	Notes
1	CM	10	(Netherlands)	Marc Anthony Klok	1	0	0	0	0	0	0	0	1	0	
1	RB	47	(Italy)	Marco Motta	1	0	0	0	0	0	0	0	1	0	
1	CB	56	(Indonesia)	Maman Abdurrahman	1	0	0	0	0	0	0	0	1	0	
Players have left the club
1	CB	4	(Indonesia)	Ryuji Utomo Prabowo	1	0	0	0	0	0	0	0	1	0	

Last updated: 14 March 2020
Source: Competitions
Only competitive matches
(yellow card) = Number of bookings; (second yellow card) = Number of sending offs after a second yellow card; (red card) = Number of sending offs by a direct red card.

=== Summary ===
Games played	2 (2 Liga 1)
Games won	1 (1 Liga 1)
Games drawn	1 (1 Liga 1)
Games lost	0 (0 Liga 1)
Goals scored	5 (5 Liga 1)
Goals conceded	4 (4 Liga 1)
Goal difference	+1 (+1 Liga 1)
Clean sheets	0
Yellow cards	4 (4 Liga 1)
Red cards	0
Most appearances	10 players (2 Appearances)
Top scorer	(Indonesia) Evan Dimas Darmono (2 Goals)
Top assist	(Indonesia) Riko Simanjuntak (2 Assists)
Winning Percentage	1/2 (50.00%)

Last updated: 14 March 2020.
Source: Liga 1
