= Marko Šimić (footballer, born 1988) =

Croatian footballer (born 1988)

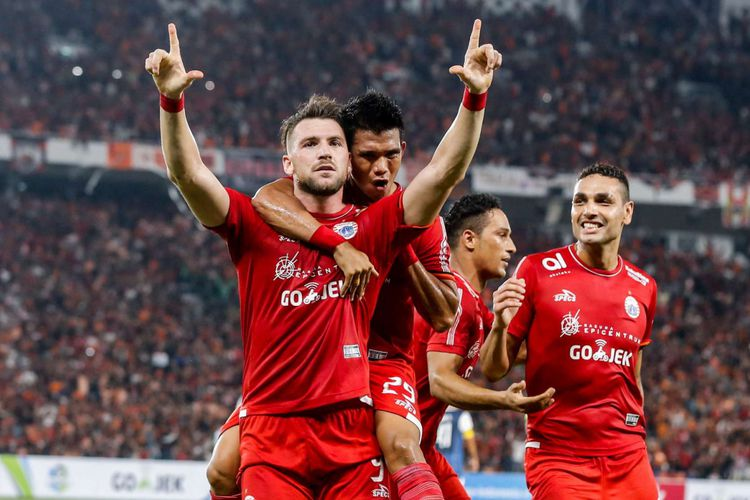
- Šimić with Persija Jakarta in 2018

Personal information
- Full name: Marko Šimić
- Date of birth: 23 January 1988 (age 38)
- Place of birth: Rijeka, SFR Yugoslavia
- Height: 1.87 m (6 ft 2 in)
- Position: Forward

Youth career
- 2001–2003: Rijeka
- 2003–2007: Dinamo Zagreb

Senior career*
Years	Team	Apps	(Gls)
2008	Daugava Daugavpils	20	(4)
2008–2009	Khimki	3	(0)
2009–2010	Lokomotiva Zagreb	8	(1)
2010–2011	Vasas	16	(3)
2011–2012	Ferencváros	8	(1)
2012	Bełchatów	5	(0)
2012–2013	Mura 05	7	(1)
2013–2014	Inter Zaprešić	3	(0)
2015	Pordenone	1	(0)
2015	Becamex Binh Duong	6	(4)
2016	Dong Thap	9	(4)
2016	Long An	10	(3)
2017	Negeri Sembilan	13	(7)
2017	Melaka United	9	(9)
2018–2022	Persija Jakarta	91	(61)
2022–2023	Radnički Kragujevac	6	(1)
2023–2025	Persija Jakarta	51	(16)

International career
2006–2007	Croatia U19	2	(0)
2009	Croatia U20	4	(0)
2009–2010	Croatia U21	7	(3)
- * Club domestic league appearances and goals as of 23 May 2025

Marko Šimić (born 23 January 1988) is a Croatian professional footballer who plays as a forward.

== Club career ==
Šimić was born in Rijeka, Croatia.

=== Negeri Sembilan ===
On 6 January 2017, Šimić joined Malaysia Premier League side Negeri Sembilan.

=== Melaka United ===
On 10 June 2017, Šimić signed with Melaka United after being dropped by Negeri Sembilan. He made his debut for Melaka United in a 1–1 draw against PKNS on 1 July 2017.

=== Persija Jakarta ===
==== First tenure ====
On 27 December 2017, Šimić signed with Persija Jakarta after not reaching agreement with Kelantan FA. Šimić made his Persija debut in a pre-season friendly against Persika Karawang on 30 December.

On 8 January 2018, Šimić made his first goal for the club in a pre-season tournament 2018 Suramadu Super Cup against Madura United, as his team drew 2–2.

In 2018 Indonesia President's Cup, Šimić scored a brace in Persija's 3–0 final win over Bali United. He also won the best player title and became a top scorer with 11 goals at that tournament. On 28 February 2018, Šimić made his international goal for Persija with scored a hat-trick in a 4–1 AFC Cup win over Tampines Rovers, and a month later, he made his league debut in the 2018 Liga 1 for Persija on 23 March in a draw 0–0 against Bhayangkara. On 31 March, Šimić scored his first league goal for Persija in the first half 1–1 draw over Arema, and in the second half, he also scored for the team, he scored in the 52nd minute, in which Šimić scored 2 goals and Persija won over Arema 3–1 at the Gelora Bung Karno Stadium.

On 10 April 2018, he scored a quat-trick as Persija claimed a 4–0 win over Johor Darul Ta’zim in the AFC Cup. Šimić also became the first player to scored a hat-trick twice and a quat-trick in 2018 AFC Cup. In 2018, Šimić brought Persija Jakarta to their first Liga 1 title and their eleventh Indonesian league title overall (including those Persija won in the Perserikatan era).

Šimić then won the Golden Boot award after he finished the 2019 season as the top goal-scorer in the Liga 1 with 28 goals.

On 2 October 2021, Šimić scored his goal for Persija against Persiraja Banda Aceh as his team won 1–0, Persija's victory over Persiraja was determined by a Šimić goal through a penalty kick in the 70th minute, Simic's goal is also his 50th record during strengthening with Persija Jakarta.

On 26 April 2022, Šimić terminates contract unilaterally with Persija after his salary was cut when 2020 Liga 1 was stopped.

==== Second tenure ====
After a brief time playing with FK Radnički 1923 Keagujevac, Šimić returned to Persija right before the start of the 2023-2024 Liga 1 season. He signed a two-year deal with Persija. On his second start in a match against Bhayangkara which ended 4–1, Šimić scored his 99th and 100th goal for Persija in all competitions.

== International career ==
Šimić has represented Croatia internationally at U19, U20 and U21 level.

== Career statistics ==
=== Club ===
As of match played 23 May 2025

Appearances and goals by club, season and competition
Club	Season	League			Cup (Note: Includes Magyar Kupa, Croatian Football Cup, Malaysia FA Cup and Piala Indonesia.)		League Cup (Note: Includes Ligakupa and Malaysia Cup.)		Continental (Note: Includes AFC Cup and AFC Champions League.)		Others		Total	
Club	Season	Division	Apps	Goals	Apps	Goals	Apps	Goals	Apps	Goals	Apps	Goals	Apps	Goals
Daugava	2008	Virslīga	20	4	–		–		–		–		20	4
Khimki	2009	Russian Premier League	3	0	–		–		–		–		3	0
Lokomotiva	2010–11	1. HNL	8	1	–		–		–		–		8	1
Vasas	2011–12	Nemzeti Bajnokság I	16	3	1	0	3	2	–		–		20	5
Ferencváros	2011–12	Nemzeti Bajnokság I	8	1	–		–		–		–		8	1
Bełchatów	2012–13	Ekstraklasa	5	0	–		–		–		–		5	0
Mura 05	2012–13	PrvaLiga	7	1	–		–		–		–		7	1
Inter Zaprešić	2013–14	2. HNL	3	0	1	0	–		–		–		4	0
Pordenone	2014–15	Serie C	1	0	–		–		–		–		1	0
Becamex Binh Duong	2015	V.League 1	6	4	–		–		–		–		6	4
Dong Thap	2016	V.League 1	9	4	–		–		–		–		9	4
Loang An	2016	V.League 1	10	3	–		–		–		–		10	3
Negeri Sembilan	2017	Liga Premier	13	7	6	2	–		–		–		19	9
Melaka United	2017	Liga Super	9	9	–		3	3	–		–		12	12
Persija Jakarta	2018	Liga 1	30	18	0	0	–		7	9	6 (Note: Appearances in Indonesia President's Cup.)	11	43	38
Persija Jakarta	2019	Liga 1	32	28	6	5	–		2	1	–		40	34
Persija Jakarta	2020	Liga 1	2	1	0	0	–		–		5 (Note: Appearances in East Java Governor Cup.)	6	7	7
Persija Jakarta	2021–22	Liga 1	27	14	0	0	–		–		7 (Note: Appearances in Menpora Cup.)	2	34	16
Persija Jakarta	Total		91	61	6	5	–		9	10	18	19	124	95
Radnički Kragujevac	2022–23	Serbian SuperLiga	6	1	0	0	–		–		–		6	1
Persija Jakarta	2023–24	Liga 1	27	11	0	0	–		–		0	0	27	11
Persija Jakarta	2024–25	Liga 1	24	5	0	0	–		–		2	0	26	5
Persija Jakarta	Total		51	16	0	0	–		0	0	2	0	53	16
Career total			266	115	14	7	6	5	9	10	20	19	315	166

== Honours ==
Daugava Daugavpils

- Latvian Cup: 2008

Becamex Bình Dương

- V.League 1: 2015
- Vietnamese Cup: 2015

Persija Jakarta

- Liga 1: 2018
- Indonesia President's Cup: 2018
- Menpora Cup: 2021
- Piala Indonesia runner-up: 2018–19

Individual

- Indonesia President's Cup Top Goalscorer: 2018
- Indonesia President's Cup Best Player: 2018
- Liga 1 Top Goalscorer: 2019
- Liga 1 Team of the Season: 2019
- East Java Governor Cup Top Goalscorer: 2020
- APPI Indonesia Soccer Awards Best Forward: 2019
- APPI Indonesia Soccer Awards Best Goal: 2019
- APPI Indonesia Soccer Awards Best XI: 2019
- Liga 1 Goal of the Month: December 2021
