= Yan Pieter Nasadit =

Indonesian association footballer

Yan Nasadit
Personal information
- Full name: Yan Pieter Cornelis Nasadit
- Date of birth: November 30, 1996 (age 29)
- Place of birth: Jayapura, Indonesia
- Height: 1.74 m (5 ft 9 in)
- Position: Midfielder

Youth career
- Persipura Jayapura

Senior career*
Years	Team	Apps	(Gls)
2017–2018	Persipura Jayapura	27	(2)
2018–2019	Persija Jakarta	13	(0)
2019	Kalteng Putra	13	(0)
2020	Persis Solo	0	(0)
2021	Muba Babel United	0	(0)
2021	Persiba Balikpapan	7	(0)
2022–2024	Persipura Jayapura	6	(0)
- * Club domestic league appearances and goals as of 3 February 2024

Yan Pieter Cornelis Nasadit (born November 30, 1996) is an Indonesian professional footballer who plays as a midfielder for Liga 2 club Persipura Jayapura.

== Club career ==
=== Persipura Jayapura ===
In 2017, Nasadit joined Liga 1 club Persipura Jayapura. He made his debut on 23 April 2017 in a match against Bali United. On 3 July 2017, Nasadit scored his first goal for Persipura in the 10th minute against Mitra Kukar at the Mandala Stadium, Jayapura.

=== Persija Jakarta ===
In 2021, Nasadit signed a contract with Indonesian Liga 2 club Persija Jakarta. He made his league debut on 31 March 2018 in a match against Arema at the Gelora Bung Karno Stadium, Jakarta.

=== Kalteng Putra ===
In middle season 2019, Nasadit signed a contract with Indonesian Liga 1 club Kalteng Putra. He made his league debut on 24 September 2019 in a match against PSIS Semarang at the Tuah Pahoe Stadium, Palangka Raya.

=== Persis Solo ===
He was signed for Persis Solo to play in Liga 2 in the 2020 season. This season was suspended on 27 March 2020 due to the COVID-19 pandemic. The season was abandoned and was declared void on 20 January 2021.

=== Persiba Balikpapan ===
In 2021, Nasadit signed a contract with Indonesian Liga 2 club Persiba Balikpapan. He made his league debut on 6 October against Kalteng Putra at the Tuah Pahoe Stadium, Palangka Raya.

== Honours ==
=== Club ===
Persija Jakarta

- Liga 1: 2018
- Indonesia President's Cup: 2018
