= Steven Paulle =

French footballer (born 1986)

Personal information
- Full name: Steven Paulle
- Date of birth: 10 February 1986 (age 40)
- Place of birth: Cannes, France
- Height: 1.87 m (6 ft 2 in)
- Position: Centre-back

Senior career*
Years	Team	Apps	(Gls)
2005–2010	Cannes	108	(4)
2010–2016	Dijon	104	(3)
2017–2019	PSM Makassar	58	(2)
2019	Persija Jakarta	4	(0)
2020–2021	Cannes	0	(0)
Total		274	(9)
- * Club domestic league appearances and goals

Steven Paulle (born 10 February 1986) is a French former footballer who plays as a centre-back.

== Career ==
Paulle has previously played for hometown club Cannes amassing over 100 league appearances with the club before departing for Dijon.

In February 2019, he moved to Persija Jakarta.

== Honours ==
Dijon

- Ligue 2 Runner-up: 2015–16

PSM Makassar

- Liga 1 Runner-up: 2018
