= Alfath Fathier =

Indonesian footballer

Personal information
- Full name: Alfath Fathier
- Date of birth: 28 May 1996 (age 30)
- Place of birth: Purwakarta, Indonesia
- Height: 1.72 m (5 ft 8 in)
- Positions: Winger; full-back

Youth career
- 2013–2016: Persib Bandung

Senior career*
Years	Team	Apps	(Gls)
2017	Persiba Balikpapan	27	(0)
2018–2019	Madura United	42	(2)
2020–2021	Persija Jakarta	0	(0)
2021–2024	Persis Solo	31	(1)
2022	→ Barito Putera (loan)	0	(0)
2024–2025	Bekasi City	0	(0)
2026	Persiku Kudus	3	(0)

International career
2018	Indonesia	3	(1)
- * Club domestic league appearances and goals as of 3 May 2026

Alfath Fathier (born 28 May 1996) is an Indonesian professional footballer who plays as a winger or full-back.

== International career ==
He made his debut with Indonesia on 10 October 2018 in a friendly against Myanmar, and Fathier scored his first international goal for Indonesia in a match against Timor-Leste in the 2018 AFF Championship.

== Career statistics ==
=== Club ===
As of match played 3 May 2026

Club	Season	League			Cup (Note: Includes Piala Indonesia)		Other		Total	
Club	Season	Division	Apps	Goals	Apps	Goals	Apps	Goals	Apps	Goals
Persiba Balikpapan	2017	Liga 1	27	0	0	0	0	0	27	0
Madura United	2018	Liga 1	16	0	0	0	0	0	16	0
Madura United	2019	Liga 1	26	2	4	0	0	0	30	2
Madura United	Total		42	2	4	0	0	0	46	2
Persija Jakarta	2020	Liga 1	0	0	0	0	0	0	0	0
Persija Jakarta	2021	Liga 1	0	0	0	0	0	0	0	0
Persija Jakarta	Total		0	0	0	0	0	0	0	0
Persis Solo	2021	Liga 2	0	0	0	0	0	0	0	0
Persis Solo	2022–23	Liga 1	18	1	0	0	3 (Note: Appearances in Indonesia President's Cup)	0	21	1
Persis Solo	2023–24	Liga 1	13	0	0	0	0	0	13	0
Barito Putera (loan)	2021–22	Liga 1	0	0	0	0	0	0	0	0
Bekasi City	2024–25	Liga 2	0	0	0	0	0	0	0	0
Persiku Kudus	2025–26	Championship	3	0	0	0	0	0	3	0
Career total			103	3	4	0	3	0	110	3

=== International ===
As of match played 11 December 2018

Appearances and goals by national team and year
National team	Year	Apps	Goals
Indonesia	2018	3	1
Total		3	1

=== International goals ===
Scores and results list Indonesia's goal tally first.

No.	Date	Venue	Opponent	Score	Result	Competition
1.	13 November 2018	Gelora Bung Karno Stadium, Jakarta, Indonesia	Timor-Leste	1–1	3–1	2018 AFF Championship

== Honours ==
=== Club ===
Persija Jakarta

- Menpora Cup: 2021

=== Individual ===
- Liga 1 Best XI: 2018
