= Riko Simanjuntak =

Indonesian footballer

Personal information
- Full name: Riko Simanjuntak
- Date of birth: 26 January 1992 (age 34)
- Place of birth: Pematangsiantar, Indonesia
- Height: 1.58 m (5 ft 2 in)
- Position: Winger

Team information
- Current team: PSS Sleman
- Number: 25

Senior career*
Years	Team	Apps	(Gls)
2012−2013	PSMS Medan	9	(3)
2013–2014	PS Bangka	18	(7)
2015	Gresik United	3	(1)
2016−2017	Semen Padang	66	(4)
2018−2026	Persija Jakarta	165	(9)
2025−2026	→ PSS Sleman (loan)	42	(2)
2026–	PSS Sleman	10	(0)

International career
2018–2023	Indonesia	11	(0)
- * Club domestic league appearances and goals as of 22 November 2026

Riko Simanjuntak (born 26 January 1992) is an Indonesian professional footballer, also known as Ucok, who plays as a winger for Super League club PSS Sleman. Before he joined Persija, he had changed clubs four times. He is often a mainstay player for the team in Indonesian competitions.

== Club career ==
=== PSMS Medan ===
In 2010–12, before he joined PSMS Medan, Ucok was an amateur futsal player in Pematangsiantar, North Sumatra. He and his brother Johan Simanjuntak always played together in one team. Simanjuntak plays as a right flank, and Johan as a left flank. Once, PSMS's Coach Suimin Diharja watched their futsal match together. Ucok and Johan's speed, agility, and sharpness made the coach interested in recruiting him. Finally, Simanjuntak and Johan joined PSMS and played for PSMS Medan who were then playing in the Indonesia Super League. This was Ucok 's first football club.

=== PS Bangka ===
After the chaotic league dualism, a year later, Ucok did not get a League 1 team. He finally joined and played for Liga 2 club PS Bangka. This is where he showed his abilities in the field. In the 18 games he played, Simanjuntak scored 7 goals.

=== Gresik United ===
In the 2015 season, Ucok signed a year's contract with Persegres Gresik United. He made his debut in a 0–1 away win against Barito Putera on 11 April. He scored his first goal in a 2–1 home win against Borneo, scoring after 45 minutes.

=== Semen Padang ===
In 2016, Ucok signed with Semen Padang for the Indonesia Soccer Championship A. He made 66 league appearances and scored 4 goals for Semen Padang.

=== Persija Jakarta ===
In 2018, Ucok signed a contract with Indonesian Super League club Persija Jakarta. He made his debut on 23 March 2018 in a match against Bhayangkara. On 8 June 2018, Ucok scored his first goal for Persija against TIRA-Persikabo in the 85th minute at the Sultan Agung Stadium, Bantul.

== International career ==
Ucok played for the Indonesia national team at the 2018 AFF Championship and the 2022 FIFA World Cup qualification.

In March 2023, Ucok was named to Indonesia's squad by Manager Shin Tae-Yong for two friendly matches against Burundi. The selection was met with surprise, as it marked his return to the national side after four years.

== Others ==
Ucok was called up by Rahmad Darmawan to played for the Liga Indonesia All-Stars in the 2025 Piala Presiden where he scored in a 6–3 lost to EFL Championship club Oxford United on 6 July 2025.

== Career statistics ==
=== Club ===
As of match played 4 September 2026

Club	Season	League			Cup (Note: Includes Piala Indonesia)		League Cup		Continental (Note: Appearances in AFC Cup) (Note: Appearances in AFC Champions League)		Other (Note: Appearances in Indonesia President's Cup)		Total	
Club	Season	Division	Apps	Goals	Apps	Goals	Apps	Goals	Apps	Goals	Apps	Goals	Apps	Goals
PSMS Medan	2013	Liga Indonesia Premier Division	9	3	0	0	–		–		0	0	9	3
PS Bangka	2014	Indonesia Premier Division	18	7	0	0	–		–		0	0	18	7
Gresik united	2015	Indonesia Super League	3	1	0	0	–		–		0	0	3	1
Semen Padang	2016	ISC A	32	2	0	0	–		–		0	0	32	2
Semen Padang	2017	Liga 1	34	2	0	0	–		–		7	1	41	3
Semen Padang	Total		66	4	0	0	–		0	0	7	1	73	5
Persija Jakarta	2018	Liga 1	27	3	0	0	–		8	0	7	0	42	3
Persija Jakarta	2019	Liga 1	32	0	8	0	–		8	1	3	0	51	1
Persija Jakarta	2020	Liga 1	2	0	0	0	–		–		0	0	2	0
Persija Jakarta	2021–22	Liga 1	29	0	0	0	–		–		8 (Note: Appearances in Menpora Cup)	1	37	1
Persija Jakarta	2022–23	Liga 1	30	5	0	0	–		–		2	0	32	5
Persija Jakarta	2023–24	Liga 1	31	1	0	0	–		–		0	0	31	1
Persija Jakarta	2024–25	Liga 1	14	0	0	0	–		–		4	1	18	1
Persija Jakarta	Total		165	9	8	0			16	1	24	2	213	12
PSS Sleman (loan)	2024–25	Liga 1	15	0	0	0	–		–		0	0	15	0
PSS Sleman (loan)	2025–26	Championship	27	2	0	0	–		–		0	0	27	2
PSS Sleman	2026–27	Super League	10	0	0	0	1	0	–		0	0	11	0
Career total			313	26	8	0	1	0	16	1	31	3	369	30

=== International ===
As of match played 28 March 2023

Appearances and goals by national team and year
National team	Year	Apps	Goals
Indonesia	2018	5	0
Indonesia	2019	4	0
Indonesia	2023	2	0
Total		11	0

== Honours ==
=== Club honors ===
Persija Jakarta

- Liga 1: 2018
- Indonesia President's Cup: 2018
- Menpora Cup: 2021
- Piala Indonesia runner-up: 2018–19

PSS Sleman

- Championship runner up: 2025–26

=== Individual ===
- Liga 1 Best XI: 2018
- Liga 2 Best XI: 2025–26
- ASEAN Football Federation Best XI: 2019
- AFC Cup All-time XI: Wide midfielders
