= Adixi Lenzivio =

Indonesian footballer

Personal information
- Full name: Adixi Lenzivio
- Date of birth: 29 September 1992 (age 34)
- Place of birth: Bekasi, Indonesia
- Height: 1.72 m (5 ft 8 in)
- Position: Goalkeeper

Team information
- Current team: Persipu
- Number: 8

Youth career
- Menteng
- Persija Jakarta

Senior career*
Years	Team	Apps	(Gls)
2011–2015	Persija Jakarta	9	(0)
2016	Antam (futsal)		
2019	Pegasus Sambas (futsal)		
2019–2022	Persija Jakarta	6	(0)
2022–2023	PSMS Medan	4	(0)
2023–2024	Arema	1	(0)
2023–2024	→ PSMS Medan (loan)	6	(0)
2024–	Persipu	8	(0)
- * Club domestic league appearances and goals as of 24 April 2025

Adixi Lenzivio (born 29 September 1992) is an Indonesian professional footballer who plays as a goalkeeper for Liga 4 club Persipu. He is the son of Persija Jakarta player in the 1980s Adityo Darmadi.

== Club career ==
=== Persija Jakarta ===
Adixi gained the confidence to escort Persija's squad while clashing with Persisam Samarinda at the Gelora Bung Karno Stadium, Senayan, Jakarta, 6 January 2013. He also paid the trust to the latest performances. He successfully withstood the onslaught of Persisam players. Although ultimately Ferdinand Sinaga tore his goal through a free kick.

=== Futsal career ===
He took a break from professional football in 2016 to study in a university, majoring in economics and made a switch to futsal. He played for Antam FC and FC Pegasus Sambas in Indonesia Pro Futsal League.

=== Professional Football Return ===
While playing for FC Pegasus, he was called up to Indonesia national futsal team selection in 2019, and briefly after he was offered to come back to Persija. The team loaned out Daryono to Badak Lampung F.C. and he was needed to back Andritany Ardhiyasa and Shahar Ginanjar up. He accepted the offer and rejoined Persija, with giving up his futsal career.

He played for the first time for Persija since 2015 in a 2021–22 Liga 1 match against Persipura Jayapura on 18 September 2021.

== Career statistics ==
=== Club ===
As of 24 April 2025

Club	Season	League			Cup		Continental		Other (Note: Includes Menpora Cup)		Total	
Club	Season	Division	Apps	Goals	Apps	Goals	Apps	Goals	Apps	Goals	Apps	Goals
Persija Jakarta	2011–12	Indonesian Super League	0	0	0	0	–		0	0	0	0
Persija Jakarta	2013	Indonesian Super League	7	0	0	0	–		0	0	7	0
Persija Jakarta	2014	Indonesian Super League	1	0	0	0	–		0	0	1	0
Persija Jakarta	2015	Indonesian Super League	1	0	0	0	–		0	0	1	0
Persija Jakarta	2019	Liga 1	0	0	0	0	–		0	0	0	0
Persija Jakarta	2020	Liga 1	0	0	0	0	–		0	0	0	0
Persija Jakarta	2021–22	Liga 1	6	0	0	0	–		0	0	6	0
Persija Jakarta	Total		15	0	0	0	–		0	0	15	0
PSMS Medan	2022–23	Liga 2	4	0	0	0	–		0	0	4	0
Arema	2023–24	Liga 1	1	0	0	0	–		0	0	1	0
PSMS Medan (loan)	2023–24	Liga 2	6	0	0	0	–		0	0	6	0
Persipu	2024–25	Liga 4	8	0	0	0	–		0	0	8	0
Career total			34	0	0	0	0	0	0	0	34	0

== Honours ==
Persija Jakarta

- Menpora Cup: 2021
- Piala Indonesia runner-up: 2018–19
