= Sandi Sute =

Indonesian footballer

Personal information
- Full name: Sandi Darman Sute
- Date of birth: 21 September 1992 (age 34)
- Place of birth: Palu, Indonesia
- Height: 1.72 m (5 ft 8 in)
- Position: Defensive midfielder

Youth career
- Diklat Mandau Bontang
- 2011–2012: Persisam Putra Samarinda

Senior career*
Years	Team	Apps	(Gls)
2012–2016	Persisam Samarinda	35	(2)
2016	Borneo	4	(0)
2017–2021	Persija Jakarta	81	(2)
2021–2022	Persis Solo	11	(0)
2022	→ Arema (loan)	14	(0)
2022–2023	RANS Nusantara	7	(0)
2023	Bali United	7	(1)
2023–2024	Kalteng Putra	2	(0)
2024–2025	PSMS Medan	18	(0)
2025–2026	Persiku Kudus	12	(0)
2026	Deltras	5	(1)
- * Club domestic league appearances and goals as of 12 April 2026

Sandi Darman Sute (born 21 September 1992) is an Indonesian professional footballer who plays as a defensive midfielder.

== Club career ==
=== Bali United ===
In 2015, Sandi signed with Bali United, he joined the club because of financial factors that occurred at his previous club, Persisam Samarinda. Apart from financial factors, the move was allegedly to save Persisam and a quick way to share Tanuri's business, he is one of the players who was also brought in by management to move to Bali.

Sandi made his first 2015 Indonesia Super League debut on 4 April 2015, coming on as a starter in a 2–1 loss with Perseru Serui at the Marora Stadium, Yapen Islands Regency. During his career at Bali United, he only made 2 league appearances because this season was officially discontinued by PSSI on 2 May 2015 due to a ban by Imam Nahrawi, Minister of Youth and Sports Affairs, against PSSI to run any football competition.

=== Borneo ===
In 2016, Sandi returned to the island of Borneo and signed a contract with Pusamania Borneo. With his club, Sandi played one season in 2016 Indonesia Soccer Championship A with a record of 21 matches.

=== Persija Jakarta ===
In 2017, Sandi signed one-year contract with Persija Jakarta, he made his first league debut on 16 April 2017, coming on as a starter in a 0–2 win with Persiba Balikpapan. On 2 December 2018, Sandi scored his first league goal in the 2018 Liga 1 for Persija in a 1–2 victory over Bali United at the Kapten I Wayan Dipta Stadium.

On 23 April 2019, Sandi scored his international goal in the 2019 AFC Cup for Persija in 2–3 loss over Philippines Football League club Ceres-Negros at the Gelora Bung Karno Stadium.

=== Persis Solo ===
On 31 May 2021, Sandi signed one-year contract with Liga 2 club Persis Solo, he joined the club with his friend while still in Persija, Heri Susanto. Sandi made his first 2021–22 Liga 2 debut on 26 September 2021, coming on as a substitute in a 2–0 win with PSG Pati at the Manahan Stadium, Surakarta.

==== Arema (loan) ====
In January 2022, Sute signed a contract with Liga 1 club Arema on loan from Persis Solo. Sute made his league debut in a 1–0 win against Bhayangkara on 9 January 2022 as a substitute for Hanif Sjahbandi in the 63rd minute at the Kompyang Sujana Stadium, Denpasar.

=== RANS Nusantara ===
He was signed for RANS Nusantara to play in Liga 1 in the 2022–23 season. On 23 July 2022, Sute made his league debut as a substitute in a 3–2 loss against Bali United at Kapten I Wayan Dipta Stadium.

== Honours ==
Persija Jakarta

- Liga 1: 2018
- Indonesia President's Cup: 2018
- Menpora Cup: 2021
- Piala Indonesia runner-up: 2018–19

Persis Solo

- Liga 2: 2021
