= Rachmad Hidayat =

Indonesian association footballer

Personal information
- Full name: Rachmad Hidayat
- Date of birth: 10 March 1992 (age 34)
- Place of birth: Medan, Indonesia
- Height: 1.72 m (5 ft 8 in)
- Positions: Winger; attacking midfielder

Team information
- Current team: PSMS Medan
- Number: 99

Youth career
- –2005: SSB Putra Muda
- 2005–2009: Medan United
- 2009–2010: PSMS Medan

Senior career*
Years	Team	Apps	(Gls)
2010–2011	Medan Chiefs	16	(3)
2011–2014	Pro Duta	60	(23)
2015–2016	Pelita Bandung Raya	2	(0)
2016	Persib Bandung	8	(0)
2017–2018	Sriwijaya	13	(0)
2018	PSMS Medan	14	(5)
2019	Bhayangkara	6	(0)
2019	Persija Jakarta	11	(0)
2020–2021	PSMS Medan	12	(6)
2022	PSIS Semarang	18	(1)
2023	PSS Sleman	8	(0)
2023–2025	PSMS Medan	35	(10)
2025–2026	Sumsel United	18	(6)
2026–	PSMS Medan	0	(0)
- * Club domestic league appearances and goals as of 2 May 2026

Rachmad Hidayat (born 10 March 1992) is an Indonesian professional footballer who plays as a winger or attacking midfielder for Championship club PSMS Medan.

== Club career ==
=== Early career ===
Rachmad started his career in Putra Muda Soccer School in Medan, then, Rachmad moved to Medan United Academy. Finally he joined Pro Duta.

=== Pelita Bandung Raya ===
In 2015, he joined Pelita Bandung Raya with teammate from Pro Duta, Ghozali Siregar for 2015 Indonesia Super League season.

=== Sriwijaya ===
He signed a contract with Sriwijaya to play in 2017 Liga 1. Hidayat made his league debut on 17 April 2017 in a Sumatera's Derby match against Semen Padang, coming on as a substitute for Maldini Pali in the 46th minute.

=== PSMS Medan ===
He was signed a contract with another Sumatera club PSMS Medan to play in 2018 Liga 1. Hidayat made his league debut on 23 July 2018 in a match against PSM Makassar, he coming as a substitute for Abdul Aziz Lutfi Akbar in the injury time. On 3 August 2018, Hidayat scored his first goal for the club, scoring in a 3–1 lose over Bhayangkara in the Indonesian Liga 1.

=== Bhayangkara ===
He was signed a contract with Bhayangkara to play in 2019 Liga 1. Hidayat made his league debut on 16 May 2019 in a match against Borneo, he coming as a substitute for Dendy Sulistyawan in the 71st minute. He only made six appearances with the club.

=== Persija Jakarta ===
He signed a contract with Persija Jakarta. Hidayat made his league debut on 23 September 2019 in a match against Barito Putera, coming on as a substitute for Ramdani Lestaluhu in the 67th minute.

=== Return to PSMS Medan ===
He was signed for PSMS Medan to play in Liga 2 in the 2020 season. This season was suspended on 27 March 2020 due to the COVID-19 pandemic. The season was abandoned and was declared void on 20 January 2021.

=== PSIS Semarang ===
In 2022, Rachmad signed a contract with Indonesian Liga 1 club PSIS Semarang. He made his league debut on 6 January 2022 in a match against Persija Jakarta at the Kapten I Wayan Dipta Stadium, Gianyar.

=== PSS Sleman ===
Rachmad Hidayat became PSS Sleman's in half of the 2022–23 Liga 1. Rachmad made his debut on 14 January 2023 in a match against PSM Makassar at the Gelora B.J. Habibie Stadium, Parepare.
