= Heri Susanto =

Indonesian footballer

Personal information
- Full name: Heri Susanto
- Date of birth: 15 July 1994 (age 32)
- Place of birth: Magelang, Indonesia
- Height: 5 ft 7 in (1.70 m)
- Position: Winger

Team information
- Current team: PSBS Biak
- Number: 94

Youth career
- 2012–2014: Persipasi Bandung Raya

Senior career*
Years	Team	Apps	(Gls)
2015	Persipasi Bandung Raya	1	(0)
2016–2017	Persiba Balikpapan	48	(4)
2018	PSM Makassar	5	(0)
2019–2021	Persija Jakarta	25	(3)
2021–2022	Persis Solo	7	(0)
2022–2024	Persita Tangerang	31	(0)
2024–2025	Adhyaksa	12	(1)
2025–	PSBS Biak	20	(3)
- * Club domestic league appearances and goals as of 9 March 2026

Heri Susanto (born 15 July 1994) is an Indonesian professional footballer who plays as a winger for Super League club PSBS Biak.

== Club career ==
=== Persiba Balikpapan ===
Heri made his debut against Arema FC in the first week 2016 Indonesia Soccer Championship A, that time, Heri as a substitute. His first goal when he scored against Bali United F.C. in the fifth week.

On ninth week, against Persegres Gresik United, Heri added a collection of his goal. In the second half was just five minutes, Heri Susanto scored when Persiba against Persegres Gresik United. Heri brought a win 5–3 over Gresik United

=== PSM Makassar ===
He was signed for PSM Makassar to play in Liga 1 in the 2018 season. Heri Susanto made his league debut on 4 June 2018 against Persipura Jayapura at the Mandala Stadium, Jayapura.

=== Persija Jakarta ===
In 2019, Susanto signed a contract with Indonesian Liga 1 club Persija Jakarta. Susanto made his first Liga 1 appearance on 20 May 2019, coming on as a substitute in a 1–1 draw with Barito Putera at the 17th May Stadium.

=== Persis Solo ===
On 31 May 2021, Susanto signed one-year contract with Liga 2 club Persis Solo, he joined the club with his friend while still in Persija, Sandi Sute. Susanto made his first 2021–22 Liga 2 debut on 26 September 2021, coming on as a substitute in a 2–0 win with PSG Pati at the Manahan Stadium, Surakarta.

=== Persita Tengerang ===
Susanto was signed for Persita Tangerang to play in Liga 1 in the 2022–23 season. He made his league debut on 25 July 2022 in a match against Persik Kediri at the Indomilk Arena, Tangerang.

== Career statistics ==
=== Club ===
As of match played 9 March 2026

Club	Season	League			Cup (Note: Includes Piala Indonesia)		Continental (Note: Appearances in AFC Cup)		Other		Total	
Club	Season	Division	Apps	Goals	Apps	Goals	Apps	Goals	Apps	Goals	Apps	Goals
Persipasi Bandung Raya	2015	Indonesia Super League	1	0	0	0	0	0	0	0	1	0
Persiba Balikpapan	2016	ISC A	23	4	0	0	0	0	0	0	23	4
Persiba Balikpapan	2017	Liga 1	25	0	0	0	0	0	0	0	25	0
Persiba Balikpapan	Total		48	4	0	0	0	0	0	0	48	4
PSM Makassar	2018	Liga 1	5	0	0	0	0	0	0	0	5	0
Persija Jakarta	2019	Liga 1	25	3	5	0	5	1	0	0	35	4
Persija Jakarta	2020	Liga 1	0	0	0	0	0	0	0	0	0	0
Persija Jakarta	2021–22	Liga 1	0	0	0	0	0	0	0	0	0	0
Persija Jakarta	Total		25	3	5	0	5	1	0	0	35	4
Persis Solo	2021	Liga 2	7	0	0	0	0	0	0	0	7	0
Persita Tangerang	2022–23	Liga 1	18	0	0	0	–		3 (Note: Appearances in Indonesia President's Cup)	0	21	0
Persita Tangerang	2023–24	Liga 1	13	0	0	0	0	0	0	0	13	0
Persita Tangerang	Total		31	0	0	0	0	0	3	0	34	0
Adhyaksa	2024–25	Liga 2	12	1	0	0	0	0	0	0	12	1
PSBS Biak	2025–26	Super League	20	3	0	0	0	0	0	0	20	3
Career total			149	11	5	0	5	1	3	0	162	12

== Honours ==
Persija Jakarta

- Menpora Cup: 2021
- Piala Indonesia runner-up: 2018–19

Persis Solo

- Liga 2: 2021
