= Dwiki Arya =

Indonesian footballer

Personal information
- Full name: Adrianus Dwiki Arya Poernomo
- Date of birth: 1 May 2000 (age 26)
- Place of birth: Semarang, Indonesia
- Height: 1.66 m (5 ft 5 in)
- Position: Midfielder

Youth career
- SSB Sport Supaya Sehat
- POPDA Central Java
- SSB Tugu Muda
- 2015–2016: PPLP Central Java
- 2017: PSIS Semarang
- 2018: Bhayangkara
- 2019: Persija Jakarta

Senior career*
Years	Team	Apps	(Gls)
2019–2022	Persija Jakarta	21	(0)
2021	→ Persela Lamongan (loan)	0	(0)
2022–2023	Persela Lamongan	7	(0)
2023	PSMS Medan	0	(0)
2023–2024	Semen Padang	11	(0)
2024	Persikabo 1973	7	(0)
2024–2025	PSPS Pekanbaru	2	(0)
2025–2026	Persiba Balikpapan	9	(0)
- * Club domestic league appearances and goals as of 28 March 2026

Adrianus Dwiki Arya Poernomo (born 1 May 2000) is an Indonesian professional footballer who plays as a midfielder.

== Club career ==
=== Persija Jakarta ===
Dwiki Arya made his first-team debut on 7 November 2019 as a substitute in a match against Semen Padang at the Haji Agus Salim Stadium, Padang.

==== Persela Lamongan (loan) ====
He signed for Persela Lamongan on 5 Maret 2021 season, on loan from Persija Jakarta.

== Career statistics ==
=== Club ===
As of 28 March 2026.

Club	Season	League			Cup		Continental		Other		Total	
Club	Season	Division	Apps	Goals	Apps	Goals	Apps	Goals	Apps	Goals	Apps	Goals
Persija Jakarta	2019	Liga 1	3	0	0	0	–		0	0	3	0
Persija Jakarta	2020	Liga 1	1	0	0	0	–		0	0	1	0
Persija Jakarta	2021	Liga 1	17	0	0	0	–		0	0	17	0
Persija Jakarta	2022–23	Liga 1	0	0	0	0	–		2 (Note: Appearances in Indonesia President's Cup)	0	2	0
Persela Lamongan (loan)	2021	Liga 1	0	0	0	0	–		4 (Note: Appearances in Menpora Cup)	0	4	0
Persela Lamongan	2022–23	Liga 2	7	0	0	0	–		0	0	7	0
PSMS Medan	2023–24	Liga 2	0	0	0	0	–		0	0	0	0
Semen Padang	2023–24	Liga 2	11	0	0	0	–		0	0	11	0
Persikabo 1973	2024–25	Liga 2	7	0	0	0	–		0	0	7	0
PSPS Pekanbaru	2024–25	Liga 2	2	0	0	0	—		0	0	2	0
Persiba Balikpapan	2025–26	Liga 2	9	0	0	0	—		0	0	9	0
Career total			57	0	0	0	0	0	6	0	63	0

== Honours ==
Semen Padang

- Liga 2 runner-up: 2023–24
