= Fitra Ridwan =

Indonesian footballer (born 1994)

Personal information
- Full name: Fitra Ridwan Salam
- Date of birth: 16 March 1994 (age 32)
- Place of birth: Banda Aceh, Indonesia
- Height: 1.69 m (5 ft 7 in)
- Position: Midfielder

Team information
- Current team: PSIS Semarang
- Number: 27

Senior career*
Years	Team	Apps	(Gls)
2011–2012	PSGL Gayo Lues	10	(3)
2013–2014	Persiraja Banda Aceh	14	(3)
2014–2015	Persegres Gresik United	3	(0)
2015–2016	Bhayangkara	6	(0)
2016–2017	Persegres Gresik	10	(0)
2017–2019	Persija Jakarta	39	(2)
2020–2021	PSS Sleman	10	(0)
2022–2024	Persik Kediri	49	(2)
2024–2025	PSPS Pekanbaru	21	(2)
2025–2026	Persiraja Banda Aceh	22	(4)
2026–	PSIS Semarang	7	(1)
- * Club domestic league appearances and goals as of 21 November 2026

Fitra Ridwan Salam (born 16 March 1994) is an Indonesian professional footballer who plays as a midfielder for Championship club PSIS Semarang.

== Club career ==
=== Bhayangkara ===
Fitra Ridwan made his debut against PS TNI, although replacing Evan Dimas when evan followed training in Spain with RCD Espanyol B

=== Persegres Gresik United ===
Fitra Ridwan rejoined to Persegres Gresik United in 2017 Liga 1, after earlier in 2015, Fitra had joined to Persegres Gresik United in 2015 Indonesia Super League

=== Persija Jakarta ===
In August 2017, he joined Persija Jakarta to play in Liga 1. Fitra made his debut on 6 August 2017 in a match against Barito Putera. On 30 September 2017, Fitra scored his first goal for Persija against PS TNI in the 13th minute at the Patriot Candrabhaga Stadium, Bekasi.

=== PSS Sleman ===
In 2020, Fitra signed a one-year contract with Indonesian Liga 1 club PSS Sleman. He made his debut on 1 March 2020 in a match against PSM Makassar. This season was suspended on 27 March 2020 due to the COVID-19 pandemic. The season was abandoned and was declared void on 20 January 2021.

=== Persik Kediri ===
In 2022, Fitra signed a contract with Indonesian Liga 1 club Persik Kediri. He made his league debut on 8 January 2022 in a match against Borneo at the Kapten I Wayan Dipta Stadium, Gianyar.

== Honours ==
=== Club ===
Persija Jakarta

- Liga 1: 2018
- Indonesia President's Cup: 2018

PSS Sleman

- Menpora Cup third place: 2021
