= Joan Tomàs (footballer) =

Spanish footballer

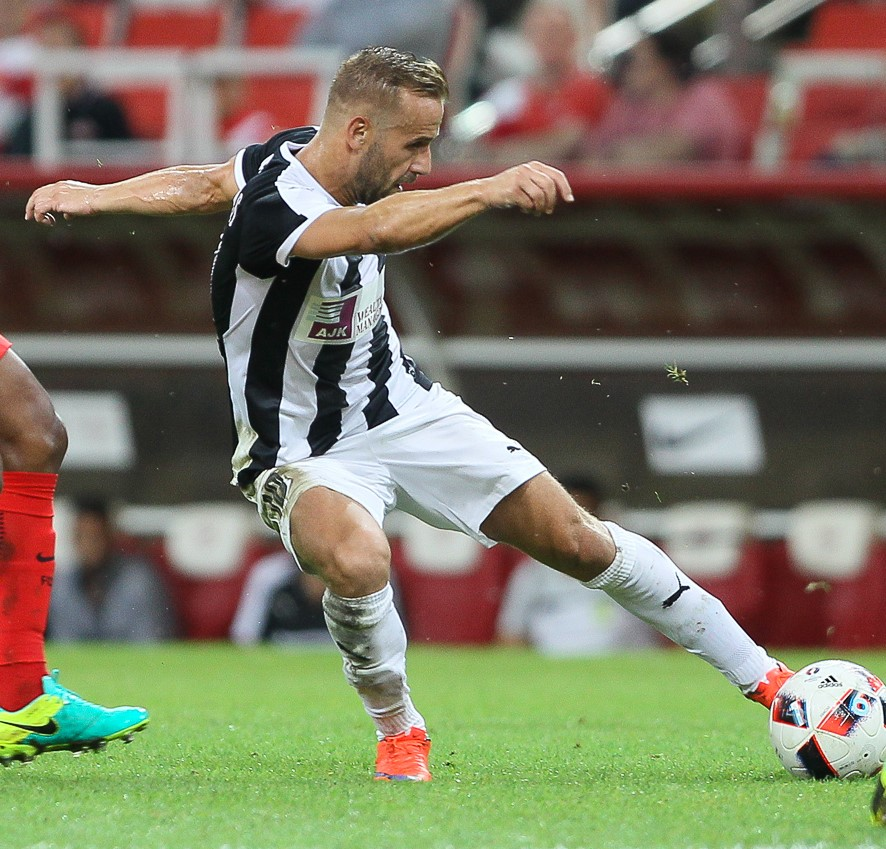
- J. Tomàs with AEK Larnaca in 2016

Personal information
- Full name: Joan Tomàs Campasol
- Date of birth: 17 May 1985 (age 41)
- Place of birth: Girona, Spain
- Height: 1.67 m (5 ft 5 1/2 in)
- Positions: Winger; striker

Youth career
- Espanyol

Senior career*
Years	Team	Apps	(Gls)
2003–2007	Espanyol B	51	(11)
2006–2007	→ Lleida (loan)	26	(3)
2007–2008	Alicante	36	(8)
2008–2010	Villarreal B	67	(25)
2009	Villarreal	1	(0)
2010–2013	Celta	67	(10)
2013–2019	AEK Larnaca	158	(35)
2019	Lamia	14	(2)
2019	Persija	13	(1)
2021–2023	Peralada	38	(5)
Total		471	(100)

International career
2004	Spain U19	8	(1)
- * Club domestic league appearances and goals

Joan Tomàs Campasol (born 17 May 1985), known as Joan Tomàs, is a Spanish former professional footballer. Mainly a left-winger, he could also operate as a striker.

== Club career ==
Born in Girona, Catalonia, Joan Tomàs was an unsuccessful graduate from Espanyol's youth ranks, after which he moved to neighbours Lleida in the Segunda División B. After one season with Alicante in the same tier, which ended in promotion, he joined Villarreal.

Even though already 23, Joan Tomàs spent over a year registered with the B side, and made his first-team – and La Liga – debut on 1 February 2009, in a 3–0 away loss against Deportivo de La Coruña. During the 2008–09 campaign, also, he was one of the most important elements for the reserves as they eventually achieved a first-ever promotion to Segunda División.

In the summer of 2010, Joan Tomàs left Villarreal and signed for Celta of the second division. He contributed five goals in 37 matches in his second year, as the Galicians returned to the top flight after a five-year absence. He played just 24 minutes at the higher level, before he was released from his contract by mutual consent.

Joan Tomàs then joined AEK Larnaca of the Cypriot First Division, with whom he spent six years. In January 2019, he signed for Lamia of Super League Greece. On 28 February, he scored with a scuffed shot to beat Olympiacos goalkeeper Yury Lodygin in a 1–0 away win that qualified for the semi-finals of the Greek Football Cup 4–3 on aggregate. In July, he renewed his link for one season.

Joan Tomàs moved countries again in late August 2019, with the 34-year-old agreeing to a deal at Liga 1 (Indonesia) club Persija Jakarta. He retired in 2023 after two seasons with amateurs CF Peralada in his native region, immediately being appointed their assistant manager.

== Career statistics ==
Club	Season	League			Cup		Continental		Total	
Club	Season	Division	Apps	Goals	Apps	Goals	Apps	Goals	Apps	Goals
Espanyol B	2002–03	Segunda División B	1	0	—		—		1	0
Espanyol B	2003–04	Segunda División B	16	1	—		—		16	1
Espanyol B	2004–05	Segunda División B	34	10	—		—		34	10
Espanyol B	Total		51	11	—		—		51	11
Lleida (loan)	2006–07	Segunda División B	26	3	2	0	—		28	3
Villarreal B	2008–09	Segunda División B	34	18	—		6 (Note: Appearances in Segunda División B play-offs)	2	40	20
Villarreal B	2009–10	Segunda División	33	7	—		—		33	7
Villarreal B	Total		67	25	—		6	2	73	27
Villarreal	2008–09	La Liga	1	0	0	0	—		1	0
Celta	2010–11	Segunda División	26	5	1	0	—		27	5
Celta	2011–12	Segunda División	37	5	4	1	—		41	6
Celta	2012–13	La Liga	3	0	2	0	—		5	0
Celta	Total		66	10	7	1	—		73	11
AEK Larnaca	2012–13	Cypriot First Division	14	4	5	2	—		19	6
AEK Larnaca	2013–14	Cypriot First Division	31	9	4	1	—		35	10
AEK Larnaca	2014–15	Cypriot First Division	30	6	6	3	—		36	9
AEK Larnaca	2015–16	Cypriot First Division	30	8	5	2	2 (Note: Appearances in UEFA Europa League)	0	37	10
AEK Larnaca	2016–17	Cypriot First Division	18	2	1	0	8	2	27	4
AEK Larnaca	2017–18	Cypriot First Division	29	6	4	0	8	2	41	8
AEK Larnaca	2018–19	Cypriot First Division	6	0	1	0	6	1	13	1
AEK Larnaca	Total		158	35	26	8	24	5	208	48
Lamia	2018–19	Super League Greece	14	2	5	1	—		19	3
Career total			385	86	40	10	30	7	453	103

== Honours ==
AEK Larnaca

- Cypriot Cup: 2017–18
- Cypriot Super Cup: 2018

Spain U19

- UEFA European Under-19 Championship: 2004
