= Farri Agri =

Indonesian footballer

Personal information
- Full name: Syaffarizal Mursalin Agri Samara
- Date of birth: 8 August 1992 (age 34)
- Place of birth: Lhokseumawe, Indonesia
- Height: 1.78 m (5 ft 10 in)
- Position: Midfielder

Youth career
- 2005–2008: Al Khor
- 2008–2009: Aspire Academy

Senior career*
Years	Team	Apps	(Gls)
2009–2015	Al Khor	5	(0)
2015–2017	Al Ahli	2	(0)
2018–2019	Al-Markhiya	2	(0)
2019	Persija Jakarta	1	(0)
2020–2021	Mesaimeer	8	(0)
2022–2023	Muaither	13	(0)
- * Club domestic league appearances and goals as of 17:17, 6 May 2023 (UTC)

Syaffarizal Mursalin Agri Samara (born 8 August 1992), better known as Farri Agri, is an Indonesian professional footballer who plays as a midfielder.

== Football career ==
Farri Agri started his career in football at the age of 16 where a bootcamp take place to test young football player who are chosen to be enrolled for Qatar league. Farri has played football at a junior level for Al Khor and was recruited for the Aspire Academy.

Agri was called up to the Indonesian under-23 team in January 2011 for the Olympic qualification matches. However, he did not show up for the training camp. In August 2011, though, Agri said that he wanted to play for Indonesia.

In 2015, he joined Al Ahli. He made his league debut for the club on 27 September 2015.

In 2019, Farri Agri signed a with Liga 1 club Persija Jakarta.

== Honours ==
=== Clubs honors ===
Al-Khor

- GCC Champions League runner-up: 2012–13

Al-Mesaimeer

- Qatari Second Division Cup: 2021

Muaither SC

- Qatari Second Division: 2022–23

== Personal life ==
Agri moved to Al Khor, Qatar with his family aged four, he has been raised in Qatar ever since. He holds a Bachelor of Business Management degree from Stenden University Qatar.
