= Ryuji Utomo =

Indonesian footballer

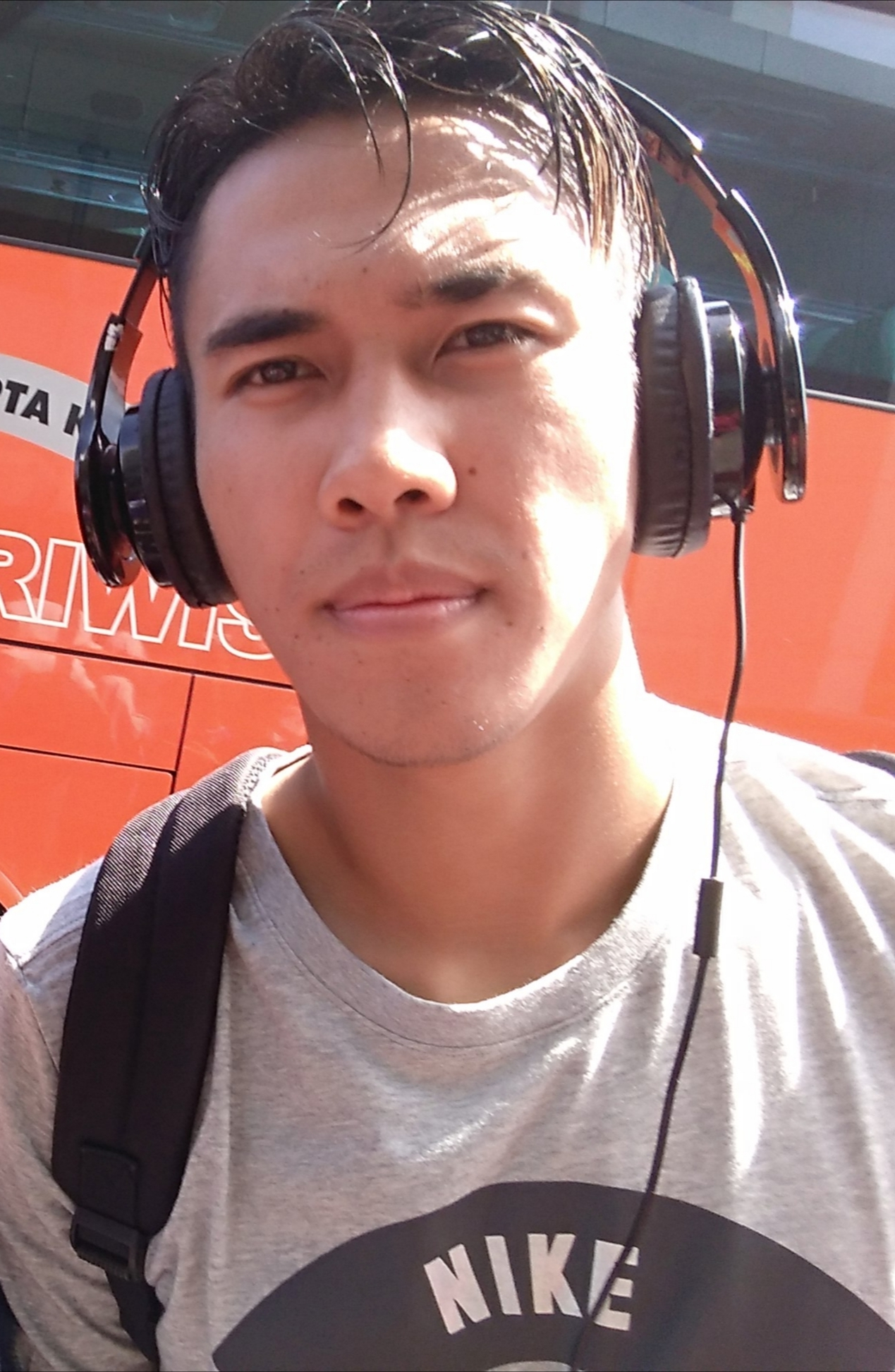
- Ryuji Utomo in 2017

Personal information
- Full name: Ryuji Utomo Prabowo
- Date of birth: 1 July 1995 (age 31)
- Place of birth: Jakarta, Indonesia
- Height: 1.85 m (6 ft 1 in)
- Positions: Centre-back; defensive midfielder

Team information
- Current team: Persita Tangerang
- Number: 4

Youth career
- 2005–2011: ASIOP Apacinti
- 2011–2012: Deportivo Indonesia
- 2013–2014: Persib Bandung

Senior career*
Years	Team	Apps	(Gls)
2014–2015	Mitra Kukar	0	(0)
2015–2016	Al-Najma	16	(1)
2016	Arema	11	(1)
2017–2022	Persija Jakarta	36	(2)
2017–2018	→ PTT Rayong (loan)	18	(0)
2021	→ Penang (loan)	15	(0)
2023–2025	Bali United	13	(0)
2024–2025	→ Persita Tangerang (loan)	19	(3)
2025–	Persita Tangerang	14	(0)

International career
2011–2014	Indonesia U19	10	(1)
2017–2018	Indonesia U23	3	(0)
2017–2021	Indonesia	3	(0)
Medal record
Men's football
Representing Indonesia
Southeast Asian Games
Bronze medal – third place	2017 Kuala Lumpur	Team
AFF Championship
Runner-up	2020 Singapore	Team
- * Club domestic league appearances and goals as of 25 October 2026

Ryuji Utomo Prabowo (born 1 July 1995) is an Indonesian professional footballer who plays for Super League club Persita Tangerang. He plays mainly at centre-back but can also operate as a defensive midfielder.

== Club career ==
=== Al Najma ===
After training at youth clubs in Indonesia, Ryuji made his professional debut in Bahrain with Manama club Al-Najma in a 20 August 2015 friendly match against Malkiya Club. In this match, Ryuji was a starter who played 60 minutes before he was replaced. During this match, he received a yellow card in the fifth minute after a foul in the penalty area.

Ryuji on 19 December 2015 scored his first goal for Al Najma in an away match against Al Tadamun Buri.

=== Arema FC ===
After six months in Bahrain, Ryuji returned to Indonesia to join Arema ahead of the unauthorized 2016 Indonesia Soccer Championship (ISC). As an apprentice to Arema's more senior players, Ryuji began to build his reputation as a physically robust defender who caught the attention of richer clubs at the end of the ISC. During a pre-season tournament ahead of the launching of the new Liga 1 (Indonesia) top-flight competition, Ryuji left Arema after failing to win a starting position.

=== Persija Jakarta ===
Rich club Persija Jakarta saw Ryuji's Arema departure as a chance to develop the young defender's potential. On 3 February 2017, Ryuji accepted an offer to join his hometown club. Another reason was Ryuji wanted to play close to his Jakarta-based ailing father. Ryuji played in nine matches for Persija in the 2017 Liga 1 season, impressing coach Stefano Cugurra who used him when senior players were on international duty.

Despite its intention to keep Ryuji for the 2018 season, Persija let Ryuji play in Thailand on loan for a year. This spell increased Ryuji's value, leading to a renewed contract in 2019 to guarantee his services. However, Ryuji went overseas again on loan from December 2020 as a byproduct of the COVID-19 pandemic that stopped the 2020 Liga 1 season. Without certainty on when professional football in Indonesia could resume, Ryuji chose to take an offer to play for the newly promoted Malaysia Super League club Penang for one full season.

==== PTT Rayong (loan) ====
On 4 December 2017, Ryuji joined Thai League 2 club PTT Rayong on a one-year contract. His agent said one of the reasons that made Ryuji take the offer was the pay could help him finance his ailing father's medical treatment, indicating that Persija did not pay him as satisfactory. At Rayong, Ryuji developed into a more versatile player as coach Teerasak Po-on often played the center back as a defensive midfielder. Ryuji played in 18 matches for Rayong and helped the club win the 2018 Thai League 2 season, earning it a promotion into Thai League 1.

==== Penang FC (loan) ====
Ryuji in December 2020 signed for Penang to play in the 2021 Malaysia Super League season, on loan from Persija Jakarta. On 6 March 2021, Ryuji made his debut for Penang on a league game against Kuala Lumpur City, playing full 90-minutes as his team won 1–0.

=== Bali United ===
On 13 January 2023, Ryuji signed a contract with Liga 1 club Bali United from Persija Jakarta. Ryuji made his league debut for the club in a 2–2 draw against PSM Makassar, coming on as a substituted Ilija Spasojević.

== International career ==
Ryuji has always played for Indonesia on the international level despite eligibility to play for Japan, where his mother comes from. Ryuji was part of the Indonesia national under-23 football team that won bronze in the 2017 Southeast Asian Games. After playing 13 times for the Indonesian national youth teams, Ryuji made his international debut for the senior team on 21 March 2017, against Myanmar.

== Career statistics ==
=== Club ===
As of match played 25 October 2026

Club	Season	League			Cup (Note: Includes Piala Indonesia, Thai FA Cup)		Continental (Note: Appearances in AFC Cup) (Note: Appearances in AFC Champions League)		Other		Total	
Club	Season	Division	Apps	Goals	Apps	Goals	Apps	Goals	Apps	Goals	Apps	Goals
Mitra Kukar	2015	Indonesia Super League	0	0	0	0	–		0	0	0	0
Arema	2016	ISC A	11	1	0	0	–		0	0	11	1
Persija Jakarta	2017	Liga 1	9	0	0	0	–		0	0	9	0
Persija Jakarta	2019	Liga 1	19	2	6	2	6	0	3 (Note: Appearances in Indonesia President's Cup)	1	34	5
Persija Jakarta	2020	Liga 1	2	0	0	0	–		0	0	2	0
Persija Jakarta	2021–22	Liga 1	3	0	0	0	–		0	0	3	0
Persija Jakarta	2022–23	Liga 1	3	0	0	0	–		1	0	4	0
Persija Jakarta	Total		36	2	6	2	6	0	4	1	52	5
PTT Rayong (loan)	2018	Thai League 2	18	0	2	0	–		0	0	20	0
Penang (loan)	2021	Malaysia Super League	15	0	0	0	–		3 (Note: Appearances in Malaysia Cup)	0	18	0
Bali United	2022–23	Liga 1	8	0	0	0	–		0	0	8	0
Bali United	2023–24	Liga 1	5	0	0	0	1	0	0	0	6	0
Persita Tangerang (loan)	2024–25	Liga 1	19	3	0	0	–		0	0	19	3
Persita Tangerang	2025–26	Super League	10	0	0	0	–		0	0	10	0
Persita Tangerang	2026–27	Super League	4	0	0	0	–		0	0	4	0
Career total			126	6	8	2	7	0	7	1	148	9

=== International ===
As of match played 9 December 2021

Appearances and goals by national team and year
National team	Year	Apps	Goals
Indonesia	2017	1	0
Indonesia	2021	2	0
Total		3	0

== Personal life ==
Ryuji was born to an Indonesian father and a Japanese mother. His father, who died on 1 September 2020, motivated him to pursue his football dreams. Several of Ryuji's career decisions were shaped by his father's health conditions.

Ryuji is married to sports television presenter Shabrina Ayu, making them be seen as a celebrity couple in Indonesia. Their 16 March 2019 wedding pictures splashed the front pages of Indonesian entertainment tabloids. Ryuji became a father on 13 February 2020.

== Honours ==
PTT Rayong

- Thai League 2: 2018

Persija Jakarta

- Piala Indonesia runner-up: 2018–19

Indonesia U-23

- SEA Games bronze medal: 2017

Indonesia

- AFF Championship runner-up: 2020
