= Novri Setiawan =

Indonesian footballer

Personal information
- Full name: Novri Setiawan
- Date of birth: 11 November 1993 (age 33)
- Place of birth: Padang, Indonesia
- Height: 1.73 m (5 ft 8 in)
- Position: Right-back

Team information
- Current team: Semen Padang
- Number: 11

Youth career
- 2008–2011: Deportivo Indonesia
- 2012–2013: Sriwijaya

Senior career*
Years	Team	Apps	(Gls)
2013	Sriwijaya	2	(0)
2014	Persebaya (DU)	18	(0)
2015–2022	Persija Jakarta	130	(7)
2022–2025	Bali United	76	(3)
2025–2026	Persik Kediri	11	(0)
2026–	Semen Padang	0	(0)

International career
2007−2008	Indonesia U16	4	(0)
2009−2011	Indonesia U19	5	(2)
2013−2014	Indonesia U23	2	(1)
2014−2019	Indonesia	4	(0)
- * Club domestic league appearances and goals as of 23 May 2026

Novri Setiawan (born 11 November 1993) is an Indonesian professional footballer who plays as a right-back for Super League club Semen Padang.

== International career ==
He made his international debut on 15 May 2014, in a 1–1 draw against Dominican Republic.

== Career statistics ==
=== Club ===
As of match played 23 May 2026

Club	Season	League			Cup (Note: Includes Piala Indonesia)		Continental (Note: Appearances in AFC Cup) (Note: Appearances in AFC Champions League)		Other (Note: Appearances in Indonesia President's Cup)		Total	
Club	Season	Division	Apps	Goals	Apps	Goals	Apps	Goals	Apps	Goals	Apps	Goals
Sriwijaya	2013	Indonesia Super League	2	0	0	0	–		0	0	2	0
Persebaya (DU)	2014	Indonesia Super League	18	0	0	0	–		0	0	18	0
Persija Jakarta	2015	Indonesia Super League	0	0	0	0	–		3	0	3	0
Persija Jakarta	2016	ISC A	29	0	0	0	–		0	0	29	0
Persija Jakarta	2017	Liga 1	25	2	0	0	–		2	0	27	2
Persija Jakarta	2018	Liga 1	30	4	0	0	5	1	6	1	41	6
Persija Jakarta	2019	Liga 1	28	1	8	0	5	1	1	2	42	4
Persija Jakarta	2020	Liga 1	1	0	0	0	–		0	0	1	0
Persija Jakarta	2021–22	Liga 1	17	0	0	0	–		6 (Note: Appearances in Menpora Cup)	0	23	0
Persija Jakarta	Total		130	7	8	0	10	2	18	3	166	12
Bali United	2022–23	Liga 1	28	1	0	0	1	0	2	2	31	3
Bali United	2023–24	Liga 1	24	1	0	0	4	0	0	0	28	1
Bali United	2024–25	Liga 1	24	1	0	0	0	0	0	0	24	1
Bali United	Total		76	3	0	0	5	0	2	2	83	5
Persik Kediri	2025–26	Super League	11	0	0	0	–		0	0	11	0
Career total			237	10	8	0	11	2	20	5	276	17

=== International ===
As of match played 11 June 2019

Appearances and goals by national team and year
National team	Year	Apps	Goals
Indonesia	2014	1	0
Indonesia	2019	3	0
Total		4	0

=== International goals ===
International under-23 goals

Goal	Date	Venue	Opponent	Score	Result	Competition
1	15 September 2014	Goyang Stadium, Goyang, South Korea	Timor-Leste	5–0	7–0	2014 Asian Games

== Honours ==
Sriwijaya U-21

- Indonesia Super League U-21: 2012–13

Persija Jakarta

- Liga 1: 2018
- Indonesia President's Cup: 2018
- Menpora Cup: 2021
- Piala Indonesia runner-up: 2018–19
