= 2017 Indonesia President's Cup =

Tournament details
- Country: Indonesia
- Dates: 4 February – 12 March 2017
- Teams: 20

Final positions
- Champions: Arema
- Runners-up: Pusamania Borneo
- Third place: Persib
- Fourth place: Semen Padang

Tournament statistics
- Matches played: 40
- Goals scored: 95 (2.38 per match)
- Attendance: 427,263 (10,682 per match)
- Top goal scorer: Cristian Gonzáles (11 goals)

Awards
- Best player: Adam Alis

2017 Indonesia President's Cup (Indonesian: Piala Presiden 2017) was the second edition of the Indonesia President's Cup football championship, which was held by the Football Association of Indonesia (PSSI). The tournament was held from 4 February to 12 March 2017. In the 2015 edition, Mahaka Sports and Entertainment designated as operator of the championship; this year's edition was held up by the control of the PSSI. This championship became a means of testing the new league rules by PSSI before being used in Liga 1 in April 2017. The broadcasting rights were granted to two television stations under Elang Mahkota Teknologi group, namely Indosiar and SCTV.

== Teams ==
20 clubs participated in the 2017 President's Cup. 18 clubs from 2016 Indonesia Soccer Championship A, with the rest coming from the champions and runners-up of 2016 Indonesia Soccer Championship B, PSCS Cilacap and PSS Sleman. The twenty clubs were divided into five groups, each filled with four participants.

Team	League	2016 ISC Season	City/Regency	Province
Arema	Liga 1	2016 ISC A runner-up	Malang	East Java
Bali United	Liga 1	2016 ISC A 12th place	Gianyar	Bali
Barito Putera	Liga 1	2016 ISC A 16th place	Banjarmasin	South Kalimantan
Bhayangkara	Liga 1	2016 ISC A 7th place	Bekasi	West Java
Madura United	Liga 1	2016 ISC A 3rd place	Pamekasan	East Java
Mitra Kukar	Liga 1	2016 ISC A 10th place	Kutai Kartanegara	East Kalimantan
Persegres Gresik United	Liga 1	2016 ISC A 17th place	Gresik	East Java
Persela Lamongan	Liga 1	2016 ISC A 15th place	Lamongan	East Java
Perseru Serui	Liga 1	2016 ISC A 11th place	Serui	Papua
Persib Bandung	Liga 1	2016 ISC A 5th place	Bandung	West Java
Persiba Balikpapan	Liga 1	2016 ISC A 13th place	Balikpapan	East Kalimantan
Persija Jakarta	Liga 1	2016 ISC A 14th place	Jakarta	DKI Jakarta
Persipura Jayapura	Liga 1	2016 ISC A winners	Jayapura	Papua
PS TNI	Liga 1	2016 ISC A 18th place	Bogor	West Java
PSCS Cilacap	Liga 2	2016 ISC B winners	Cilacap	Central Java
PSM Makassar	Liga 1	2016 ISC A 6th place	Makassar	South Sulawesi
PSS Sleman	Liga 2	2016 ISC B runner-up	Sleman	DI. Yogyakarta
Pusamania Borneo	Liga 1	2016 ISC A 9th place	Samarinda	East Kalimantan
Semen Padang	Liga 1	2016 ISC A 8th place	Padang	West Sumatra
Sriwijaya	Liga 1	2016 ISC A 4th place	Palembang	South Sumatra

== Draw ==
Group A
Pos	Team
A1	PSS (Host)
A2	Persipura
A3	Mitra Kukar
A4	Persegres

Group B
Pos	Team
B1	Arema (Host)
B2	Bhayangkara
B3	Persija
B4	PS TNI

Group C
Pos	Team
C1	Persib (Host)
C2	PSM
C3	Persiba
C4	Persela

Group D
Pos	Team
D1	Bali United (Host)
D2	Sriwijaya
D3	Pusamania Borneo
D4	Barito Putera

Group E
Pos	Team
E1	Madura United (Host)
E2	Semen Padang
E3	Perseru
E4	PSCS

== Venues ==
Location of stadiums used in the 2017 Piala Presiden.
Blue: Final and Third place playoff Green: Quarter-finals and Semi-finals Yellow: Group Stage.

Bogor, West Java	Samarinda, East Kalimantan	Padang, West Sumatra
Pakansari	Segiri	Haji Agus Salim
Capacity: 30,000	Capacity: 16,000	Capacity: 10,000
Surakarta, Central Java	Sleman, Special Region of Yogyakarta	Kepanjen, East Java
Manahan	Maguwoharjo	Kanjuruhan
Capacity: 25,000	Capacity: 32,000	Capacity: 43,000
Soreang, West Java	Gianyar, Bali	Pamekasan, East Java
Si Jalak Harupat	Kapten I Wayan Dipta	Gelora Ratu Pamelingan
Capacity: 27,000	Capacity: 25,000	Capacity: 15,000

The venues of the 2017 Piala Presiden

- Final and Third place playoff: Pakansari, Bogor, West Java
- Semi-finals 1: Segiri, Samarinda, East Kalimantan
- Semi-finals 2: Si Jalak Harupat, Soreang, West Java
- Semi-finals 3: Haji Agus Salim, Padang, West Sumatra
- Semi-finals 4: Kanjuruhan, Malang, East Java
- Quarter-finals: Manahan, Surakarta, Central Java
- Group 1: Maguwoharjo, Sleman, Special Region of Yogyakarta
- Group 2: Kanjuruhan, Kepanjen, East Java
- Group 3: Si Jalak Harupat, Soreang, West Java
- Group 4: Kapten I Wayan Dipta, Gianyar, Bali
- Group 5: Gelora Ratu Pamelingan, Pamekasan, East Java

== Regulation ==
PSSI tested some special rules for clubs at the 2017 Indonesia President's Cup before being used in 2017 Liga 1. These regulations were as follows.

- Five clubs who were group winners plus the three best second place qualified for the fall. The quarter-finals and final were single matches played at a neutral venue, while the semi-finals were played on a home-and-away system.
- Each club signed at least five U-23 players and must play three of whom at least 45 minutes of game time. If one of the three U-23 players had an injury, the player was replaced by the other U-23 players.
- Each club was allowed to put more than three foreign players in the lineup. However, while playing in the field, the club must comply with the rules 2 + 1, or two non-Asian foreign players and one Asian player.
- Each club was prohibited to put more than 2 players aged over 35 in the starting lineup.

== Group stage ==
=== Group 1 ===
Pos	Team	Pld	W	D	L	GF	GA	GD	Pts	Qualification
1	Mitra Kukar	3	1	1	1	4	4	0	4	Knockout stage
2	Gresik United	3	1	1	1	2	2	0	4 (Note: Persipura and Gresik United had the same points, number of goals, and goal difference. Gresik United was decided to be ranked second in group 1 standings after winning in the draw.)	
3	Persipura Jayapura	3	1	1	1	2	2	0	4	
4	PSS Sleman (H)	3	0	3	0	3	3	0	3	

Rules for classification: 1) Points; 2) Goal difference; 3) Goals scored; 4) Head-to-head; 5) Drawing.
(H) Hosts
Notes:
- All matches played in the Sleman, Special Region of Yogyakarta
- Times listed were local (UTC+7:00)
4 February 2017
15:30

PSS Sleman	0–0	Persipura Jayapura
	Report

Maguwoharjo Stadium, Sleman
Attendance: 31.620
Referee: Thoriq Munir Alkatiri
4 February 2017
19:00

Mitra Kukar	1–0	Gresik United
In-kyun 44'	Report

Maguwoharjo Stadium, Sleman
Attendance: 357
Referee: Nusur Fadillah

9 February 2017
15:00

PSS Sleman	3–3	Mitra Kukar
Imam 17'; Riski 59', 67'	Report	Aldino 68', 90+2'; Gotor 69'

Maguwoharjo Stadium, Sleman
Attendance: 22.673
Referee: Djumadi Effendi
9 February 2017
18:30

Persipura Jayapura	1–2	Gresik United
Aji Saka 48' (o.g.)	Report	Jeki 45+1'; Arsyad 65'

Maguwoharjo Stadium, Sleman
Attendance: 175
Referee: Faulur Rosy

15 February 2017
15:00

Gresik United	0–0	PSS Sleman
	Report

Maguwoharjo Stadium, Sleman
Attendance: 32.586
Referee: Kusni
15 February 2017
18:30

Mitra Kukar	0–1	Persipura Jayapura
	Report	Marinus 35'

Maguwoharjo Stadium, Sleman
Attendance: 673
Referee: Nusur Fadillah

=== Group 2 ===
Pos	Team	Pld	W	D	L	GF	GA	GD	Pts	Qualification
1	Arema (H)	3	2	1	0	7	1	+6	7	Knockout stage
2	Bhayangkara	3	2	0	1	3	3	0	6	Knockout stage
3	Persija Jakarta	3	1	1	1	2	2	0	4	
4	PS TNI	3	0	0	3	1	7	−6	0	

Rules for classification: 1) Points; 2) Goal difference; 3) Goals scored; 4) Head-to-head; 5) Drawing.
(H) Hosts
- All matches played in the Kepanjen, East Java
- Times listed were local (UTC+7:00)
5 February 2017
15:00

Arema	2–0	Bhayangkara
Vizcarra 61'; Dendi 77'	Report

Kanjuruhan Stadium, Kepanjen
Attendance: 7.223
Referee: Hamsir
5 February 2017
18:30

Persija Jakarta	1–0	PS TNI
Rudi 90+3'	Report

Kanjuruhan Stadium, Kepanjen
Attendance: 581
Referee: Kusni

11 February 2017
15:00

Bhayangkara	2–1	PS TNI
Jajang 27'; Evan 40'	Report	Manahati 37' (pen.)

Kanjuruhan Stadium, Kepanjen
Attendance: 8.112
Referee: Novari Ikhsan
11 February 2017
18:30

Arema	1–1	Persija Jakarta
Gonzáles 23'	Report	Jhonatan 12'

Kanjuruhan Stadium, Kepanjen
Attendance: 29.389
Referee: Hadiyana

16 February 2017
15:00

PS TNI	0–4	Arema
	Report	Gonzáles 38' (pen.), 49'; Dendi 61'; Vizcarra 66'

Kanjuruhan Stadium, Kepanjen
Attendance: 5.460
Referee: Hamsir
16 February 2017
18:30

Persija Jakarta	0–1	Bhayangkara
	Report	Ilham 85'

Kanjuruhan Stadium, Kepanjen
Attendance: 1.680
Referee: Thoriq Munir Alkatiri

=== Group 3 ===
Pos	Team	Pld	W	D	L	GF	GA	GD	Pts	Qualification
1	Persib Bandung (H)	3	3	0	0	6	1	+5	9	Knockout stage
2	PSM Makassar	3	1	0	2	4	4	0	3	
3	Persela Lamongan	3	1	0	2	2	4	−2	3	
4	Persiba Balikpapan	3	1	0	2	3	6	−3	3	

Rules for classification: 1) Points; 2) Goal difference; 3) Goals scored; 4) Head-to-head; 5) Drawing.
(H) Hosts
- All matches played in the Soreang, West Java
- Times listed were local (UTC+7:00)
6 February 2017
15:00

Persiba Balikpapan	1–0	Persela Lamongan
Marlon 69' (pen.)	Report

Si Jalak Harupat Stadium, Soreang
Attendance: 7.324
Referee: Masril
6 February 2017
18:30

Persib Bandung	1–0	PSM Makassar
Vujović 60'	Report

Si Jalak Harupat Stadium, Soreang
Attendance: 17.863
Referee: Abdul Rahman

12 February 2017
15:00

PSM Makassar	1–2	Persela Lamongan
Hosseini 19'	Report	Hardianto 74', 80'

Si Jalak Harupat Stadium, Soreang
Attendance: 17.538
Referee: Untung
12 February 2017
18:30

Persib Bandung	3–1	Persiba Balikpapan
van Dijk 28' (pen.), 57'; Febri 63'	Report	Marlon 6'

Si Jalak Harupat Stadium, Soreang
Attendance: 21.483

17 February 2017
15:00

Persiba Balikpapan	1–3	PSM Makassar
Marlon 58'	Report	Hamka 7'; Ghozali 9'; Pluim 21'

Si Jalak Harupat Stadium, Soreang
Attendance: 8.236
Referee: Abdul Rahman
17 February 2017
18:30

Persela Lamongan	0–2	Persib Bandung
	Report	Kim 67' van Dijk 86'

Si Jalak Harupat Stadium, Soreang
Attendance: 18.427
Referee: Masril

=== Group 4 ===
Pos	Team	Pld	W	D	L	GF	GA	GD	Pts	Qualification
1	Pusamania Borneo	3	1	2	0	1	0	+1	5	Knockout stage
2	Sriwijaya	3	1	1	1	4	4	0	4	Knockout stage
3	Barito Putera	3	1	1	1	3	3	0	4	
4	Bali United (H)	3	0	2	1	3	4	−1	2	

Rules for classification: 1) Points; 2) Goal difference; 3) Goals scored; 4) Head-to-head; 5) Drawing.
(H) Hosts
- All matches played in the Gianyar, Bali
- Times listed were local (UTC+8:00)
7 February 2017
16:00

Pusamania Borneo	0–0	Barito Putera
	Report

Kapten I Wayan Dipta Stadium, Gianyar
Attendance: 1.000
Referee: Bahrul Ulum
7 February 2017
19:30

Bali United	2–2	Sriwijaya
Marcos 28' (pen.); Abd. Rahman 33'	Report	Hilton 7'; Beto 87'

Kapten I Wayan Dipta Stadium, Gianyar
Attendance: 18.257
Referee: Muslimin

13 February 2017
16:00

Sriwijaya	2–1	Barito Putera
Budiyono 45'; Hilton 60'	Report	Aron 83'

Kapten I Wayan Dipta Stadium, Gianyar
Attendance: 235
Referee: Iwan Sukoco
13 February 2017
19:30

Bali United	0–0	Pusamania Borneo
	Report

Kapten I Wayan Dipta Stadium, Gianyar
Attendance: 7.515
Referee: Prasetyo Hadi

18 February 2017
16:00

Barito Putera	2–1	Bali United
Fahmi 34'; Aron 90+3'	Report	Ahn 41'

Kapten I Wayan Dipta Stadium, Gianyar
Attendance: 7.529
Referee: Muslimin
18 February 2017
19:30

Pusamania Borneo	1–0	Sriwijaya
Fandi 73'	Report

Kapten I Wayan Dipta Stadium, Gianyar
Attendance: 372
Referee: Bahrul Ulum

=== Group 5 ===
Pos	Team	Pld	W	D	L	GF	GA	GD	Pts	Qualification
1	Semen Padang	3	3	0	0	12	0	+12	9	Knockout stage
2	Madura United (H)	3	2	0	1	4	3	+1	6	Knockout stage
3	PSCS Cilacap	3	1	0	2	1	6	−5	3	
4	Perseru Serui	3	0	0	3	2	10	−8	0	

Rules for classification: 1) Points; 2) Goal difference; 3) Goals scored; 4) Head-to-head; 5) Drawing.
(H) Hosts
- All matches played in the Pamekasan, East Java
- Times listed were local (UTC+7:00)
8 February 2017
15:00

Perseru Serui	0–1	PSCS Cilacap
	Report	Arief 44'

Gelora Ratu Pamelingan Stadium, Pamekasan
Attendance: 312
Referee: Oki Dwi Putra
8 February 2017
18:30

Madura United	0–1	Semen Padang
	Report	Mofu 40'

Gelora Ratu Pamelingan Stadium, Pamekasan
Attendance: 7.200
Referee: Musthofa Umarella

14 February 2017
15:00

Semen Padang	5–0	PSCS Cilacap
Mofu 45', 71'; Riko 48'; Sacramento 59'; Rudi 79'	Report

Gelora Ratu Pamelingan Stadium, Pamekasan
Attendance: 137
Referee: Yudi Effendi
14 February 2017
18:30

Madura United	3–2	Perseru Serui
Greg 27', 72'; Fabiano 59' (pen.)	Report	Delvin 30'; Boman 90+3'

Gelora Ratu Pamelingan Stadium, Pamekasan
Attendance: 5.290
Referee: Fariq Hitara

19 February 2017
15:00

Perseru Serui	0–6	Semen Padang
	Report	Sacramento 10', 33', 64'; Boman 38' (o.g.); Irsyad 49'; Boas 89'

Gelora Ratu Pamelingan Stadium, Pamekasan
Attendance: 302
Referee: Musthofa Umarella
19 February 2017
18:30

PSCS Cilacap	0–1	Madura United
	Report	Luiz 48'

Gelora Ratu Pamelingan Stadium, Pamekasan
Attendance: 5.502
Referee: Oki Dwi Putra

=== Ranking of runner-up placed teams ===
Pos	Grp	Team	Pld	W	D	L	GF	GA	GD	Pts	Qualification
1	5	Madura United	3	2	0	1	4	3	+1	6	Advance to knockout stage
2	2	Bhayangkara	3	2	0	1	3	3	0	6	Advance to knockout stage
3	4	Sriwijaya	3	1	1	1	4	4	0	4	Advance to knockout stage
4	1	Gresik United	3	1	1	1	2	2	0	4	
5	3	PSM Makassar	3	1	0	2	4	4	0	3	

Source: Group stage
Rules for classification: 1) Points; 2) Goal difference; 3) Goals scored; 4) Drawing.

== Knockout stage ==
=== Bracket ===
Quarter-finals
25 February – Surakarta
Pusamania Borneo (p)	0 (5)
Madura United	0 (4)
25 February – Surakarta
Persib Bandung	3
Mitra Kukar	2
26 February – Surakarta
Semen Padang	1
Bhayangkara	0
26 February – Surakarta
Arema	1
Sriwijaya	0

Semi-finals
2/5 March
Pusamania Borneo (p)	2	1	3 (5)
Persib Bandung	1	2	3 (3)
2/5 March
Semen Padang	1	2	3
Arema	0	5	5

Final
12 March – Bogor
Pusamania Borneo	1
Arema	5
Third place
11 March – Bogor
Persib Bandung	1
Semen Padang	0

=== Quarter-finals ===
25 February 2017
18:00 (UTC+7:00)

Persib Bandung	3–2	Mitra Kukar
Atep 11', 74'; Vujović 31'	Report	In-kyun 29'; Andre 75'

Manahan Stadium, Surakarta
Attendance: 10.115
Referee: Musthofa Umarella

25 February 2017
21:00 (UTC+7:00)

Pusamania Borneo	0–0	Madura United
	Report
Penalties
Yamashita (penalty scored); Tamsil (penalty scored); Orah (penalty scored); Fandi (penalty scored); Dirkir (penalty scored)	5–4	(penalty scored) Milovanović; (penalty scored) Slamet; (penalty scored) Rama; (penalty scored) Fabiano; (penalty missed) Fachrudin

Manahan Stadium, Surakarta
Attendance: 5.073
Referee: Hadiyana

26 February 2017
18:00 (UTC+7:00)

Arema	1–0	Sriwijaya
Adam Alis 48'	Report

Manahan Stadium, Surakarta
Attendance: 9.453
Referee: Abdul Rahman

26 February 2017
21:00 (UTC+7:00)

Semen Padang	1–0	Bhayangkara
Mofu 90'	Report

Manahan Stadium, Surakarta
Attendance: 4.201
Referee: Thoriq Munir Alkatiri

=== Semi-finals ===
First Leg

2 March 2017
19:00 (UTC+8:00)

Pusamania Borneo	2–1	Persib Bandung
Reinaldo 14'; Wanggai 67'	Report	Vujović 44'

Segiri Stadium, Samarinda
Attendance: 12.813
Referee: Bahrul Ulum
2 March 2017
20:30 (UTC+7:00)

Semen Padang	1–0	Arema
Sacramento 59' (pen.)	Report

Haji Agus Salim Stadium, Padang
Attendance: 10.000
Referee: Fariq Hitara

Second Leg

5 March 2017
17:45 (UTC+7:00)

Persib Bandung	2–1 (a.e.t.)	Pusamania Borneo
Matsunaga 31'; Atep 72'	Report	Dirkir 53'
Penalties
Vujović (penalty scored); Matsunaga (penalty scored); Kim (penalty missed); Febri (penalty scored)	3–5	(penalty scored) Yamashita; (penalty scored) Tamsil; (penalty scored) Reinaldo; (penalty scored) Fandi; (penalty scored) Dirkir

Si Jalak Harupat Stadium, Soreang
Attendance: 25.598
Referee: Faulur Rosy

Pusamania Borneo won 5–3 on penalty kicks.

5 March 2017
21:00 (UTC+7:00)

Arema	5–2	Semen Padang
Gonzáles 28', 31', 65', 89', 90+7'	Report	Sacramento 23'; Mofu 27'

Kanjuruhan Stadium, Kepanjen
Attendance: 43.000
Referee: Nusur Fadhilah

Arema won 5–3 on aggregate.

=== Third place playoff ===
11 March 2017
19:00 (UTC+7:00)

Persib Bandung	1–0	Semen Padang
Atep 33'	Report

Pakansari Stadium, Bogor
Attendance: 19.754
Referee: Musthofa Umarella

=== Final ===
12 March 2017
19:00 (UTC+7:00)

Pusamania Borneo	1–5	Arema
Firly 69'	Report	Hanif 30'; Orah 37' (o.g.); Gonzáles 42', 53', 64'

Pakansari Stadium, Bogor
Attendance: 20.068
Referee: Fariq Hitara

== Statistics ==
=== Goalscorers ===
There were 95 goals scored in 40 matches, for an average of 2.38 goals per match.

11 goals

- (Indonesia) Cristian Gonzáles

6 goals

- (Brazil) Marcel Sacramento

5 goals

- (Indonesia) Vendry Mofu

4 goals

- (Indonesia) Atep Rizal

3 goals

- (Brazil) Marlon da Silva
- (Indonesia) Sergio van Dijk
- (Montenegro) Vladimir Vujović

2 goals

- (Argentina) Esteban Vizcarra
- (Brazil) Aron da Silva
- (Brazil) Hilton Moreira
- (Indonesia) Ahmad Nur Hardianto
- (Indonesia) Aldino Herdianto
- (Indonesia) Dendi Santoso
- (Indonesia) Greg Nwokolo
- (Indonesia) Riski Novriansyah
- (South Korea) Oh In-kyun

1 goal

- (Argentina) Marcos Flores
- (Brazil) Alberto Gonçalves
- (Brazil) Fabiano Beltrame
- (Brazil) Jhonatan Bernardo
- (Brazil) Luiz Júnior
- (Brazil) Reinaldo Elias
- (Indonesia) Abdul Rahman
- (Indonesia) Adam Alis
- (Indonesia) Andre Agustiar
- (Indonesia) Arief Yulianto
- (Indonesia) Arsyad Yusgiantoro
- (Indonesia) Boas Atururi
- (Indonesia) Delvin Rumbino
- (Indonesia) Evan Dimas
- (Indonesia) Fandi Achmad
- (Indonesia) Febri Haryadi
- (Indonesia) Firly Apriansyah
- (Indonesia) Ghozali Siregar
- (Indonesia) Hamka Hamzah
- (Indonesia) Hanif Sjahbandi
- (Indonesia) Ilham Armaiyn
- (Indonesia) Imam Bagus
- (Indonesia) Irsyad Maulana
- (Indonesia) Jajang Mulyana
- (Indonesia) Jeki Arisandi
- (Indonesia) Kim Kurniawan
- (Indonesia) Manahati Lestusen
- (Indonesia) Marinus Wanewar
- (Indonesia) Nazarul Fahmi
- (Indonesia) Patrich Wanggai
- (Indonesia) Riko Simanjuntak
- (Indonesia) Rudi
- (Indonesia) Rudi Widodo
- (Indonesia) Slamet Budiyono
- (Iran) Pouya Hosseini
- (Ivory Coast) Boman Aimé
- (Japan) Shohei Matsunaga
- (Liberia) Dirkir Glay
- (Netherlands) Wiljan Pluim
- (Spain) Jorge Gotor

1 own goal

- (Indonesia) Aji Saka (against Persipura Jayapura)
- (Indonesia) Michael Orah (against Arema)
- (Ivory Coast) Boman Aimé (against Semen Padang)

=== Awards ===
- Best Referee: Musthofa Umarella
- Fair Play Team: Madura United
- Best Supporter: Persib Bandung (Bobotoh)
- Best Player: Adam Alis (Arema FC)
- Top Scorer: Cristian Gonzáles (Arema FC)
- Best Young Player: Febri Haryadi (Persib Bandung)

=== Tournament team rankings ===
As per statistical convention in football, matches decided in extra time were counted as wins and losses, while matches decided by penalty shoot-outs were counted as draws.

Pos	Grp	Team	Pld	W	D	L	GF	GA	GD	Pts	Final result
1	2	Arema	7	5	1	1	18	5	+13	16	Champions
2	4	Pusamania	7	2	3	2	5	8	−3	9	Runners-up
3	3	Persib	7	6	0	1	13	6	+7	18	Third place
4	5	Semen Padang	7	5	0	2	16	6	+10	15	Fourth place
5	5	Madura United	4	2	1	1	4	3	+1	7	Eliminated in quarter-finals
6	2	Bhayangkara	4	2	0	2	3	4	−1	6	Eliminated in quarter-finals
7	1	Mitra Kukar	4	1	1	2	6	7	−1	4	Eliminated in quarter-finals
8	4	Sriwijaya	4	1	1	2	4	5	−1	4	Eliminated in quarter-finals
9	4	Barito Putera	3	1	1	1	3	3	0	4	Eliminated in group stage
10	1	Persegres	3	1	1	1	2	2	0	4	Eliminated in group stage
11	2	Persija	3	1	1	1	2	2	0	4	Eliminated in group stage
12	1	Persipura	3	1	1	1	2	2	0	4	Eliminated in group stage
13	3	PSM	3	1	0	2	4	4	0	3	Eliminated in group stage
14	1	PSS	3	0	3	0	3	3	0	3	Eliminated in group stage
15	3	Persela	3	1	0	2	2	4	−2	3	Eliminated in group stage
16	3	Persiba	3	1	0	2	3	6	−3	3	Eliminated in group stage
17	5	PSCS	3	1	0	2	1	6	−5	3	Eliminated in group stage
18	4	Bali United	3	0	2	1	3	4	−1	2	Eliminated in group stage
19	2	PS TNI	3	0	0	3	1	7	−6	0	Eliminated in group stage
20	5	Perseru	3	0	0	3	2	10	−8	0	Eliminated in group stage

Source: Group stage, Knockout stage

== See also ==
- 2017 Indonesian League 1
- 2017 Indonesian League 2
- 2017 Indonesian League 3
