= 2017 Indonesia President's Cup final =

Indonesia President's Cup

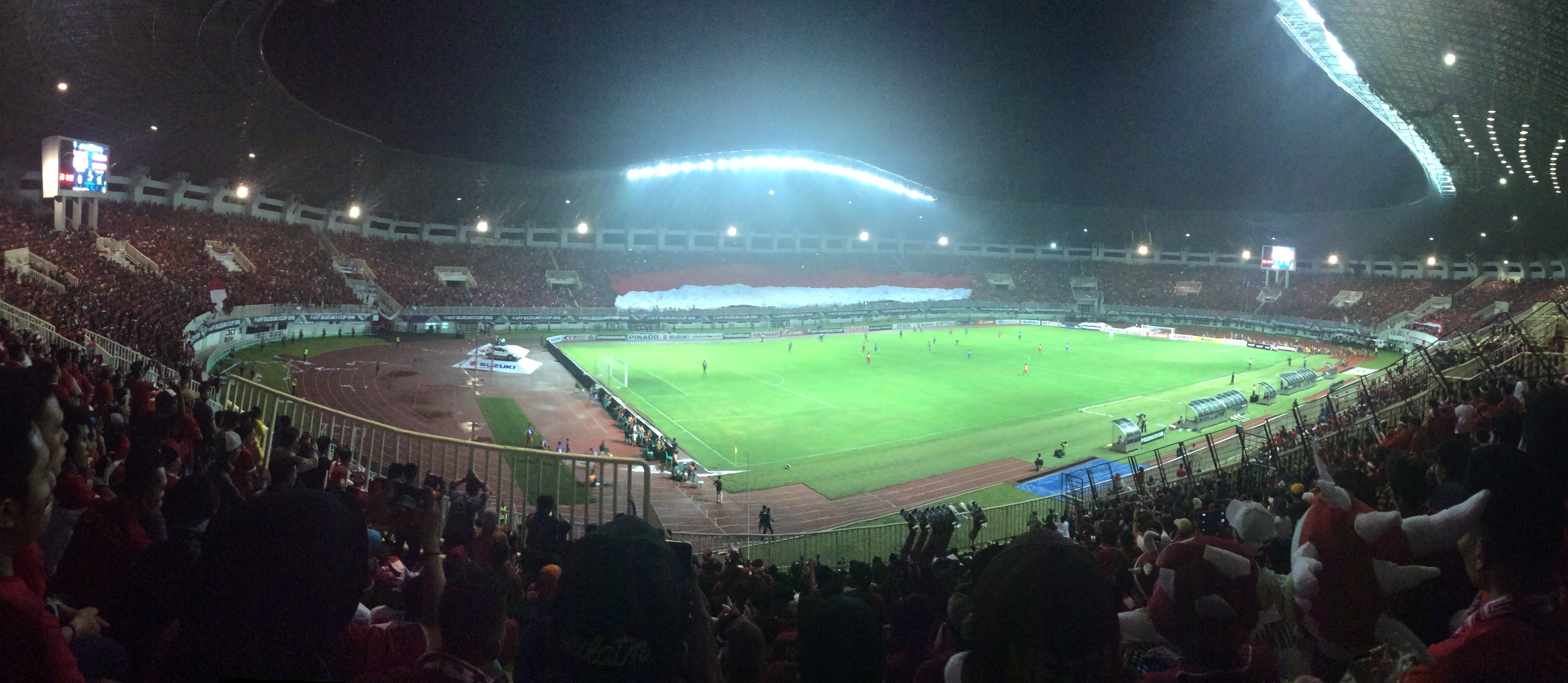
- The Pakansari Stadium in Bogor hosted the final
- Event: 2017 Indonesia President's Cup
Pusamania Borneo	Arema
1	5
- Date: 12 March 2017
- Venue: Pakansari Stadium, Bogor
- Man of the Match: Cristian Gonzáles (Arema)
- Referee: Fariq Hitaba
- Attendance: 20.068

The 2017 Indonesia President's Cup final was a football match that determined the winner of the 2017 Indonesia President's Cup. The match was held at the Pakansari Stadium in Bogor on 12 March 2017.

== Background ==
Pusamania Borneo qualified for the final after surprisingly defeating defending champions Persib Bandung on penalties. Arema advanced to the 2017 President's Cup Final after a dramatic win over Semen Padang. The final match was certainly attended by President Joko Widodo.

== Route to the final ==
Note: In all results below, the score of the finalist is given first (H: home; A: away).

Pusamania Borneo				Round	Arema			
Opponent	Result			Group stage	Opponent	Result		
Barito Putera	0–0 (H)			Matchday 1	Bhayangkara	2–0 (H)		
Bali United	0–0 (A)			Matchday 2	Persija Jakarta	1–1 (H)		
Sriwijaya	1–0 (H)			Matchday 3	PS TNI	4–0 (H)		
Group 4 winners: Pos / Team / Pld / Pts; 1 / Pusamania Borneo / 3 / 5; 2 / Sriwijaya / 3 / 4; 3 / Barito Putera / 3 / 4; 4 / Bali United (H) / 3 / 2; Source: (H) Hosts				Final standings	Group 2 winners: Pos / Team / Pld / Pts; 1 / Arema (H) / 3 / 7; 2 / Bhayangkara / 3 / 6; 3 / Persija Jakarta / 3 / 4; 4 / PS TNI / 3 / 0; Source: (H) Hosts			
Opponent	Agg.	1st leg	2nd leg	Knockout stage	Opponent	Agg.	1st leg	2nd leg
Madura United	0–0 (5–4 p) (H)			Quarter-finals	Sriwijaya	1–0 (H)		
Persib Bandung	3–3 (5–3 p)	2–1 (H)	1–2 (A)	Semi-finals	Semen Padang	5–3	0–1 (A)	5–2 (H)

== Match ==
=== Details ===
12 March 2017
19:00 (UTC+7:00)

Pusamania Borneo	1–5	Arema
Firly 69'	Report	Hanif 30'; Orah 37' (o.g.); Gonzáles 42', 53', 64'

Pakansari Stadium, Bogor
Attendance: 20.068
Referee: Fariq Hitaba

Pusamania Borneo	Arema

GK	59	(Indonesia) Wawan Hendrawan
RB	31	(Indonesia) Michael Orah		(substituted off) 55'
CB	26	(Liberia) Dirkir Glay
CB	5	(Japan) Kunihiro Yamashita	(yellow card) 25'	(substituted off) 26'
LB	24	(Indonesia) Diego Michiels
DM	6	(Indonesia) Asri Akbar (c)
RM	28	(Indonesia) Terens Puhiri		(substituted off) 62'
AM	33	(Indonesia) Wahyudi Hamisi
AM	27	(Indonesia) Patrich Wanggai	(yellow card) 90'
LM	76	(Indonesia) Rifal Lastori		(substituted off) 55'
CF	99	(Australia) Reinaldo Elias
Substitutes:
GK	1	(Indonesia) Gary Anggrana
DF	7	(Indonesia) Zulvin Zamrun
DF	46	(Indonesia) Firly Apriansyah		(substituted in) 26'
DF	18	(Indonesia) Dody Alfayed
MF	23	(Indonesia) Muhammad Satriatama
FW	92	(Indonesia) Fandy Ahmad		(substituted in) 55'
FW	88	(Indonesia) Abdul Aziz		(substituted in) 62'
Manager:
(Indonesia) Ricky Nelson

Pusamania Borneo (4–1–4–1)
Arema (4–3–3)

GK	1	(Indonesia) Kurnia Meiga	(yellow card) 78'
RB	4	(Indonesia) Syaiful Cahya		(substituted off) 62'
CB	44	(Brazil) Arthur Cunha	(yellow card) 90+1'
CB	5	(Indonesia) Bagas Adi Nugroho
LB	87	(Indonesia) Johan Alfarizi (c)
CM	23	(Indonesia) Hanif Sjahbandi	(yellow card) 36'	(substituted off) 45'
CM	18	(Indonesia) Adam Alis
AM	20	(Timor-Leste) Filipe Bertoldo		(substituted off) 62'
RW	11	(Argentina) Esteban Vizcarra
LW	21	(Indonesia) Nasir		(substituted off) 45'
CF	10	(Indonesia) Cristian Gonzáles
Substitutes:
GK	33	(Indonesia) Dwi Kuswanto
DF	7	(Indonesia) Beny Wahyudi		(substituted in) 62'
DF	31	(Indonesia) Junda Irawan
MF	12	(Indonesia) Hendro Siswanto
MF	94	(Indonesia) Feri Aman Saragih	(yellow card) 71'	(substituted in) 45'
FW	41	(Indonesia) Dendi Santoso
FW	27	(Indonesia) Dedik Setiawan		(substituted in) 62'
Manager:
(Indonesia) Aji Santoso

Man of the Match:
Cristian Gonzáles (Arema)

Assistant referees:
Beni Andriko
Bangbang Syamsudar
Fourth official:
Thoriq Munir Alkatiri

Match rules

- 90 minutes.
- 30 minutes of extra time if necessary.
- Penalty shoot-out if scores still level.
- Seven named substitutes, of which up to three may be used.

=== Statistics ===
First half
Statistic	Pusamania Borneo	Arema
Goals scored	0	3
Total shots	2	2
Shots on target	2	2
Saves	0	0
Ball possession	40%	60%
Corner kicks	0	1
Fouls committed	9	2
Offsides	0	1
Yellow cards	1	1
Red cards	0	0

Second half
Statistic	Pusamania Borneo	Arema
Goals scored	0	0
Total shots	0	0
Shots on target	0	0
Saves	0	0
Ball possession	0%	0%
Corner kicks	0	0
Fouls committed	0	0
Offsides	0	0
Yellow cards	0	0
Red cards	0	0

Extra time
Statistic	Pusamania Borneo	Arema
Goals scored	0	0
Total shots	0	0
Shots on target	0	0
Saves	0	0
Ball possession	0%	0%
Corner kicks	0	0
Fouls committed	0	0
Offsides	0	0
Yellow cards	0	0
Red cards	0	0

Overall
Statistic	Pusamania Borneo	Arema
Goals scored	0	0
Total shots	0	0
Shots on target	0	0
Saves	0	0
Ball possession	0%	0%
Corner kicks	0	0
Fouls committed	0	0
Offsides	0	0
Yellow cards	0	0
Red cards	0	0

== See also ==
- 2017 Indonesian League 1
- 2017 Indonesian League 2
- 2017 Indonesian League 3
