= 2015 Indonesia Super League =

Discontinued Indonesian football season

Indonesia Super League
- Season: 2015
- Dates: 4 April – 23 November 2015
- Matches: 19
- Goals: 58 (3.05 per match)
- Top goalscorer: Bambang Pamungkas; Fabiano Beltrame; Goran Ljubojević; Lerby Eliandry (3 goals each)
- Biggest home win: PSM 4–0 Persiba (6 April 2015)
- Biggest away win: Persela 0–2 Barito Putera (4 April 2015)
- Highest scoring: Arema Cronus 4–4 Persija (4 April 2015)
- Longest winning run: 3 matches Gresik United
- Longest unbeaten run: 3 matches Gresik United; Sriwijaya
- Longest winless run: 3 matches Sriwijaya
- Longest losing run: 2 matches Bali United; Barito Putera; Mitra Kukar
- Highest attendance: 26,193; Persib 1–0 Semen Padang (4 April 2015)
- Lowest attendance: 1,135; Persipura 2–0 Persiram (4 April 2015)
- Total attendance: 210,148
- Average attendance: 11,060

The 2015 Indonesia Super League, also known as QNB League for sponsorship reasons, was the 7th season of the top-flight Indonesian professional league for association football clubs since its establishment in 2008.

The season was planned to be started in February 2015. It was first officially announced that the 2015 Indonesia Super League would start on 1 February 2015, with verification process for the participants done in December 2014 but because of the reduction to participants to 18 teams, it was planned to start either on 21 or 22 February. After Minister of Youth and Sports Affairs, Imam Nahrawi, postponed the start of the season because of legal verifications reasons, on 23 February 2015, it was agreed that this season would start on 4 April 2015. The revised schedule was planned to end on 23 November 2015.

Persib were the defending champions. Pusamania Borneo joined as the promoted teams from the 2014 Liga Indonesia Premier Division. They replaced Persepam Madura United, Persita, Persijap, Persiba Bantul, and Persik who were relegated to the 2015 Liga Indonesia Premier Division.

The season would have some changes including the implementation of three different kick-off time for weekend matches, which are 15:30, 19:00 and 21:00. There would be also only two weekday matches scheduled.

This season was officially discontinued by PSSI on 2 May 2015 due to a ban by Imam Nahrawi, Minister of Youth and Sports Affairs, against PSSI to run any football competition.

== Teams ==
Eighteen teams competed in the league – the 17 teams from the previous season and the one team promoted from the Premier Division. The new teams this season were Pusamania Borneo and Persiwa, who replaced Persepam Madura United, Persita, Persijap, and Persiba Bantul.

Persiwa and Persik were excluded before the season for failing to comply with financial and infrastructure requirements.

=== Name changes ===
- Putra Samarinda were renamed Bali United and relocated to Gianyar.

=== Stadiums and locations ===
Locations of the 2015 Indonesia Super League teams

Team	Location	Stadium	Capacity
Arema Cronus	Malang	Kanjuruhan	42,449
Bali United	Gianyar	Kapten I Wayan Dipta	25,000
Barito Putera	Banjarmasin	May 17th	15,000
Gresik United	Gresik	Petrokimia	25,000
Mitra Kukar	Tenggarong	Aji Imbut	35,000
Persebaya ISL	Sidoarjo	Gelora Delta	35,000
Persela	Lamongan	Surajaya	14,000
Perseru	Serui	Marora	10,000
Persib	Bandung	Si Jalak Harupat	27,000
Persiba	Balikpapan	Persiba	12,500
Persija	Jakarta	Gelora Bung Karno	88,083
Persipasi Bandung Raya	Bekasi	Patriot Candrabhaga	30,000
Persipura	Jayapura	Mandala	30,000
Persiram	Sleman	Maguwoharjo (Note: Persiram would be played their first half of the season home matches at the Maguwoharjo because their new stadium was still under construction.)	31,700
PSM	Makassar	Andi Mattalata	15,000
Pusamania Borneo	Samarinda	Segiri	16,000
Semen Padang	Padang	Haji Agus Salim	15,000
Sriwijaya	Palembang	Gelora Sriwijaya	23,000

=== Personnel and kits ===
Note: Flags indicate national team as has been defined under FIFA eligibility rules. Players and coaches may hold more than one non-FIFA nationality.

Team	Head coach	Captain	Kit manufacturer	Front sponsor(s)
Arema Cronus	(Indonesia) Suharno	(Indonesia) Victor Igbonefo	Specs	Anker Sport, Ijen Suites
Bali United	(Indonesia) Indra Sjafri	(South Korea) Yoo Jae-hoon	Made by club	Indofood, Corsa, Achilles
Barito Putera	(Indonesia) Salahudin	(Indonesia) Muhammad Roby	Vision of Superior	Hasnur Group
Gresik United	(Indonesia) Liestiadi	(Indonesia) Bima Sakti	Made by club	Phonska
Mitra Kukar	Vacant	(Indonesia) Zulkifli Syukur	Joma	Petrona
Persebaya ISL	(Indonesia) Ibnu Grahan	(Indonesia) Yandri Pitoy	Mitre	Avian Brands
Persela	(Indonesia) Iwan Setiawan	(Indonesia) Choirul Huda	Diadora	
Perseru	(Indonesia) Agus Setyono	(Indonesia) Arthur Bonai	Injers	Bank Papua
Persib	(Indonesia) Djadjang Nurdjaman	(Indonesia) Atep	League	Datsun, Kantor Pos, Indofood
Persiba	(Indonesia) Edi Simon	(Brazil) Antônio Teles	Eureka	Bankaltim, Philips
Persija	(Indonesia) Rahmad Darmawan	(Indonesia) Bambang Pamungkas	League	NET.
Persipasi Bandung Raya	(Serbia) Dejan Antonić	(Latvia) Deniss Romanovs	MBB	
Persipura	(Brazil) Osvaldo Lessa	(Indonesia) Boaz Solossa	Specs	Freeport Indonesia
Persiram	(Indonesia) Eduard Tjong	(Cameroon) Mbida Messi	Made by club	
PSM	(Austria) Hans-Peter Schaller	(Indonesia) Ponaryo Astaman	Nike	Semen Bosowa
Pusamania Borneo	(Moldova) Arcan Iurie	(Indonesia) Hamka Hamzah	Salvo	Bankaltim, Nahusam Pratama Indonesia
Semen Padang	(Indonesia) Nil Maizar	(Indonesia) Hengky Ardiles	Mizuno	Semen Indonesia
Sriwijaya	(Indonesia) Benny Dollo	(Indonesia) Titus Bonai	Joma	Bank Sumsel Babel, Bukit Asam

=== Coaching changes ===
- Indicate the positions in the relegation zone.

Team	Outgoing coach	Manner of departure	Date of vacancy	Week	Table	Incoming coach	Date of appointment
Gresik United	(Argentina) Alfredo Vera	Resigned	September 2014	Pre-season		(Indonesia) Liestiadi	29 November 2014
Sriwijaya	(Indonesia) Subangkit	Sacked	September 2014	Pre-season		(Indonesia) Benny Dollo	1 October 2014
Persiba	(Indonesia) Liestiadi	Resigned	September 2014	Pre-season		(Indonesia) Edi Simon	4 December 2014
Persija	(Indonesia) Benny Dollo	Signed by Sriwijaya	1 October 2014	Pre-season		(Indonesia) Rahmad Darmawan	27 November 2014
Persela	(Indonesia) Eduard Tjong	Resigned	2 November 2014	Pre-season		(Indonesia) Iwan Setiawan	4 February 2015
Mitra Kukar	(Sweden) Stefan Hansson	End of contract	12 November 2014	Pre-season		(England) Scott Cooper	11 December 2014
Persebaya ISL	(Indonesia) Rahmad Darmawan	Sacked	12 November 2014	Pre-season		(Indonesia) Ibnu Grahan	25 December 2014
Persipura	(Brazil) Jacksen F. Tiago	Signed by Penang	15 November 2014	Pre-season		(Brazil) Osvaldo Lessa	5 January 2015
Pusamania Borneo	(Indonesia) Iwan Setiawan	Sacked	4 December 2014	Pre-season		(Moldova) Arcan Iurie	7 December 2014
Bali United	(Indonesia) Nil Maizar	Mutual consent	18 December 2014	Pre-season		(Indonesia) Indra Sjafri	18 December 2014
PSM	(Indonesia) Assegaf Razak	Mutual consent	8 January 2015	Pre-season		(Austria) Alfred Riedl	8 January 2015
Semen Padang	(Indonesia) Jafri Sastra	Sacked	22 January 2015	Pre-season		(Indonesia) Nil Maizar	25 January 2015
PSM	(Austria) Alfred Riedl	Resigned	10 April 2015	3	4	(Austria) Hans-Peter Schaller	10 April 2015
Mitra Kukar	(England) Scott Cooper	Resigned	19 April 2015	3	16		

== Foreign players ==
Football Association of Indonesia restricted the number of foreign players to three per team. A team can use all three foreign players at once.

- Players name in **bold** indicates the player was registered during the mid-season transfer window.
- Former Player(s) were players that out of squad or left club within the season, after pre-season transfer window, or in the mid-season transfer window, and at least had one appearance.

Team	Player 1	Player 2	Player 3	Former Player(s)
Arema Cronus	(Brazil) Fabiano Beltrame	(Liberia) Sengbah Kennedy	(Liberia) Yao Rudy Abblode	
Bali United	(Chile) Cristian Febre	(South Korea) Yoo Jae-hoon		
Barito Putera	(Brazil) Andrezinho	(Cyprus) Alekos Alekou	(Montenegro) Igor Radusinović	
Gresik United	(Cameroon) Herman Dzumafo	(Japan) Shohei Matsunaga	(Serbia) Saša Zečević	
Mitra Kukar	(Spain) Cristian Portilla	(Spain) Jorge Gotor	(Republic of Ireland) Roy O'Donovan	
Persebaya ISL	(Brazil) Otávio Dutra	(Cameroon) Émile Mbamba	(Cameroon) Eric Djemba-Djemba	
Persela	(Cameroon) David Pagbe	(Montenegro) Balša Božović	(Paraguay) Pedro Velázquez	
Perseru	(Nigeria) Osas Saha	(Togo) Ali Khaddafi	(Togo) Djaledjete Bedalbe	
Persib	(Mali) Makan Konaté	(Montenegro) Ilija Spasojević	(Montenegro) Vladimir Vujović	
Persiba	(Brazil) Antônio Teles	(Liberia) Ansu Toure	(Slovakia) Roman Golian	
Persija	(Argentina) Alan Aciar	(Nepal) Rohit Chand	(Russia) Evgeni Kabaev	
Persipasi Bandung Raya	(Argentina) Gaston Castaño	(Latvia) Deniss Romanovs	(Serbia) Boban Nikolić	
Persipura	(Argentina) Robertino Pugliara	(Ivory Coast) Lanciné Koné	(South Korea) Lim Joon-sik	
Persiram	(Cameroon) Mbida Messi	(France) Thierry Gathuessi	(Liberia) James Lomell	
PSM	(Ivory Coast) Boman Aimé	(Serbia) Nemanja Vučićević		
Pusamania Borneo	(Bulgaria) Martin Kovachev	(Liberia) Erick Weeks	(Montenegro) Srđan Lopičić	
Semen Padang	(Argentina) Esteban Vizcarra	(South Korea) Yoo Hyun-goo	(North Macedonia) Goran Gančev	
Sriwijaya	(Croatia) Goran Ljubojević	(Mali) Abdoulaye Maïga	(Mali) Morimakan Koïta	

== League table ==
Pos	Team	Pld	W	D	L	GF	GA	GD	Pts
1	Gresik United	3	3	0	0	6	3	+3	9
2	Persipura	2	2	0	0	7	2	+5	6
3	Persib	2	2	0	0	4	0	+4	6
4	PSM	2	1	1	0	7	3	+4	4
5	Arema Cronus	2	1	1	0	5	4	+1	4
6	Perseru	2	1	1	0	3	2	+1	4
7	Persebaya ISL	2	1	1	0	2	1	+1	4
8	Barito Putera	3	1	0	2	2	2	0	3
9	Sriwijaya	3	0	3	0	6	6	0	3
10	Persela	2	1	0	1	1	2	−1	3
11	Persija	2	0	1	1	4	5	−1	1
12	Semen Padang	2	0	1	1	2	3	−1	1
13	Pusamania Borneo	2	0	1	1	2	3	−1	1
14	Persiram	2	0	1	1	1	3	−2	1
15	Persipasi Bandung Raya	2	0	1	1	1	4	−3	1
16	Mitra Kukar	2	0	0	2	2	4	−2	0
17	Bali United	2	0	0	2	3	7	−4	0
18	Persiba	1	0	0	1	0	4	−4	0

Source: QNB League, Soccerway
Rules for classification: 1) Points; 2) Goal difference; 3) Goals scored.

== Results ==
Home \ Away	ARE	BLU	BPT	GRU	MKU	BHA	PSL	PSR	PSB	PBA	PSJ	PBR	PPR	RAM	PSM	PBO	SPD	SRI
Arema Cronus	—		1–0								4–4							
Bali United		—																
Barito Putera			—	0–1														
Gresik United				—	3–2											2–1		
Mitra Kukar					—													
Persebaya ISL					1–0	—										1–1		
Persela			0–2				—				1–0							
Perseru		2–1						—						1–1				
Persib									—			3–0					1–0	
Persiba										—								
Persija											—							
Persipasi Bandung Raya												—						
Persipura		5–2											—	2–0				
Persiram														—				
PSM										4–0					—			3–3
Pusamania Borneo																—		
Semen Padang																	—	
Sriwijaya												1–1					2–2	—

Source: QNB League, Soccerway
Legend: Blue = home team win; Yellow = draw; Red = away team win.
For upcoming matches, an "a" indicates there is an article about the rivalry between the two participants.

== Season statistics ==
=== Top goalscorers ===
Rank	Player	Team	Goals
1	(Brazil) Fabiano Beltrame	Arema Cronus	3
1	(Indonesia) Lerby Eliandry	Bali United	3
1	(Indonesia) Bambang Pamungkas	Persija	3
1	(Croatia) Goran Ljubojević	Sriwijaya	3
5	(Indonesia) Yusuf Effendi	Gresik United	2
5	(Nigeria) Osas Saha	Perseru	2
5	(Indonesia) Yohanes Pahabol	Persipura	2
5	(Indonesia) Zulham Zamrun	Persipura	2
5	(Indonesia) Syamsul Chaeruddin	PSM	2

=== Hat-tricks ===
Player	For	Against	Result	Date
(Indonesia) Bambang Pamungkas	Persija	Arema Cronus	4–4 (A)	4 April 2015

=== Discipline ===
- Most yellow card(s): 2
  - (Brazil) Fabiano Beltrame (Arema Cronus)
  - (Indonesia) Jajang Mulyana (Mitra Kukar)
  - (Indonesia) Firly Apriansyah (Persebaya ISL)
  - (Serbia) Boban Nikolić (Persipasi Bandung Raya)
  - (Indonesia) Sa Anun Al Qadry (Persiram)
  - (Indonesia) Saepulloh Maulana (Semen Padang)
- Most red card(s): 1
  - (Indonesia) Johan Alfarizi (Arema Cronus)
  - (Serbia) Saša Zečević (Gresik United)
  - (Indonesia) Jajang Mulyana (Mitra Kukar)
  - (Indonesia) Valentino Telaubun (Persiba)

== Attendances ==
Pos	Team	Total	High	Low	Average	Change
1	PSM	38,322	22,573	15,749	19,161	+3,627.8%
2	Persib	34,935	26,193	8,742	17,468	−9.6%
3	Arema Cronus	26,770	22,619	4,151	13,385	−29.1%
4	Gresik United	23,400	13,300	10,100	11,700	+89.6%
5	Persipura	22,271	21,136	1,135	11,136	+78.8%
6	Barito Putera	10,513	10,513	10,513	10,513	+69.1%
7	Sriwijaya	19,664	10,207	9,457	9,832	+0.7%
8	Persela	18,735	9,500	9,235	9,368	−2.1%
9	Perseru	11,584	6,237	5,347	5,792	+303.9%
10	Persebaya ISL	3,954	2,278	1,676	1,977	−49.8%
11	Bali United	0	0	0	0	n/a
12	Mitra Kukar	0	0	0	0	n/a
13	Persiba	0	0	0	0	n/a
14	Persija	0	0	0	0	n/a
15	Persipasi Bandung Raya	0	0	0	0	n/a
16	Persiram	0	0	0	0	n/a
17	Pusamania Borneo	0	0	0	0	n/a^{†}
18	Semen Padang	0	0	0	0	n/a
	League total	210,148	26,193	1,135	11,060	+41.4%

Source: QNB League
Notes:
^{†} Teams played previous season in Premier Division.

== See also ==
- 2015 Liga Indonesia Premier Division
- 2015 Piala Indonesia
