= Dody Alfayed =

Indonesian footballer

Personal information
- Full name: Dody Alfayed
- Date of birth: 30 August 1998 (age 28)
- Place of birth: Jombang, Indonesia
- Height: 5 ft 8 in (1.72 m)
- Position: Midfielder

Youth career
- 2014–2016: Frenz United

Senior career*
Years	Team	Apps	(Gls)
2017–2019	Borneo	8	(0)
2018	→ Persis Solo (loan)	0	(0)
2020–2021	Persijap Jepara	11	(0)
2025	Persijap Jepara	0	(0)

International career
2013	Indonesia U19	3	(0)
- * Club domestic league appearances and goals

Dody Alfayed (born 30 August 1998) is an Indonesian professional footballer who plays as a midfielder.

== Club career ==
=== Persijap Jepara ===
He was signed for Persijap Jepara to play in Liga 2 in the 2020 season. This season was suspended on 27 March 2020 due to the COVID-19 pandemic. The season was abandoned and was declared void on 20 January 2021.

== Honours ==
Borneo

- Indonesia President's Cup runner-up: 2017

Persijap Jepara

- Liga 2 Promotion play-offs: 2024–25
