= Nazarul Fahmi =

Indonesian footballer

Personal information
- Full name: Nazarul Fahmi
- Date of birth: 13 November 1996 (age 29)
- Place of birth: Aceh Timur, Indonesia
- Height: 1.65 m (5 ft 5 in)
- Positions: Midfielder; winger

Youth career
- 2011: Arsenal
- 2012: Villa 2000
- 2016: Barito Putera

Senior career*
Years	Team	Apps	(Gls)
2015–2019	Barito Putera	27	(0)
2020–2021	Persiraja Banda Aceh	3	(0)
- * Club domestic league appearances and goals as of 14 March 2020

Nazarul Fahmi (born 13 November 1996) is an Indonesian professional footballer who plays as a midfielder.

== Early career ==
In 2011, from his hometown, he went to London to training in the Arsenal Academy who coached by Arsène Wenger. After that, his career dimmed again. When coming back from the Arsenal Academy in 2011, his career is not as bright as it is today. In 2012, he played for Bireun United, Persip Pasee (Aceh), Villa 2000, Persita Tangerang, until in 2015, he joined PS Barito Putera.

== Club career ==
=== Barito Putera ===
Joined Barito Putera youth team in 2015, he was included to join the senior squad of Barito Putera in 2017. In the 2017 President's cup, Jacksen F. Tiago gave him the confidence of playing as a right wing on his team. And in the group phase of the President Cup against Bali United, he scored the opening goal in the 33rd minute in a match that was played at the Kapten I Wayan Dipta Stadium.

=== Persiraja Banda Aceh ===
In 2020, he signed for newly promoted club Persiraja to play in Liga 1. This season was suspended on 27 March 2020 due to the COVID-19 pandemic. The season was abandoned and was declared void on 20 January 2021.

== Club statistics ==
As of match played 14 March 2021

Club	Season	League			National Cup		Continental		Total	
Club	Season	Division	Apps	Goals	Apps	Goals	Apps	Goals	Apps	Goals
Barito Putera	2015	Indonesia Super League	0	0	0	0	0	0	0	0
Barito Putera	2016	Indonesia Soccer Championship A	5	0	0	0	0	0	5	0
Barito Putera	2017	Liga 1	12	0	0	0	0	0	12	0
Barito Putera	2018	Liga 1	6	0	0	0	0	0	6	0
Barito Putera	2019	Liga 1	4	0	0	0	0	0	4	0
Persiraja	2020	Liga 1	3	0	0	0	0	0	3	0
Persiraja	2021	Liga 1	0	0	0	0	0	0	0	0
Total			30	0	0	0	0	0	30	0
