= Adam Alis =

Indonesian footballer (born 1993)

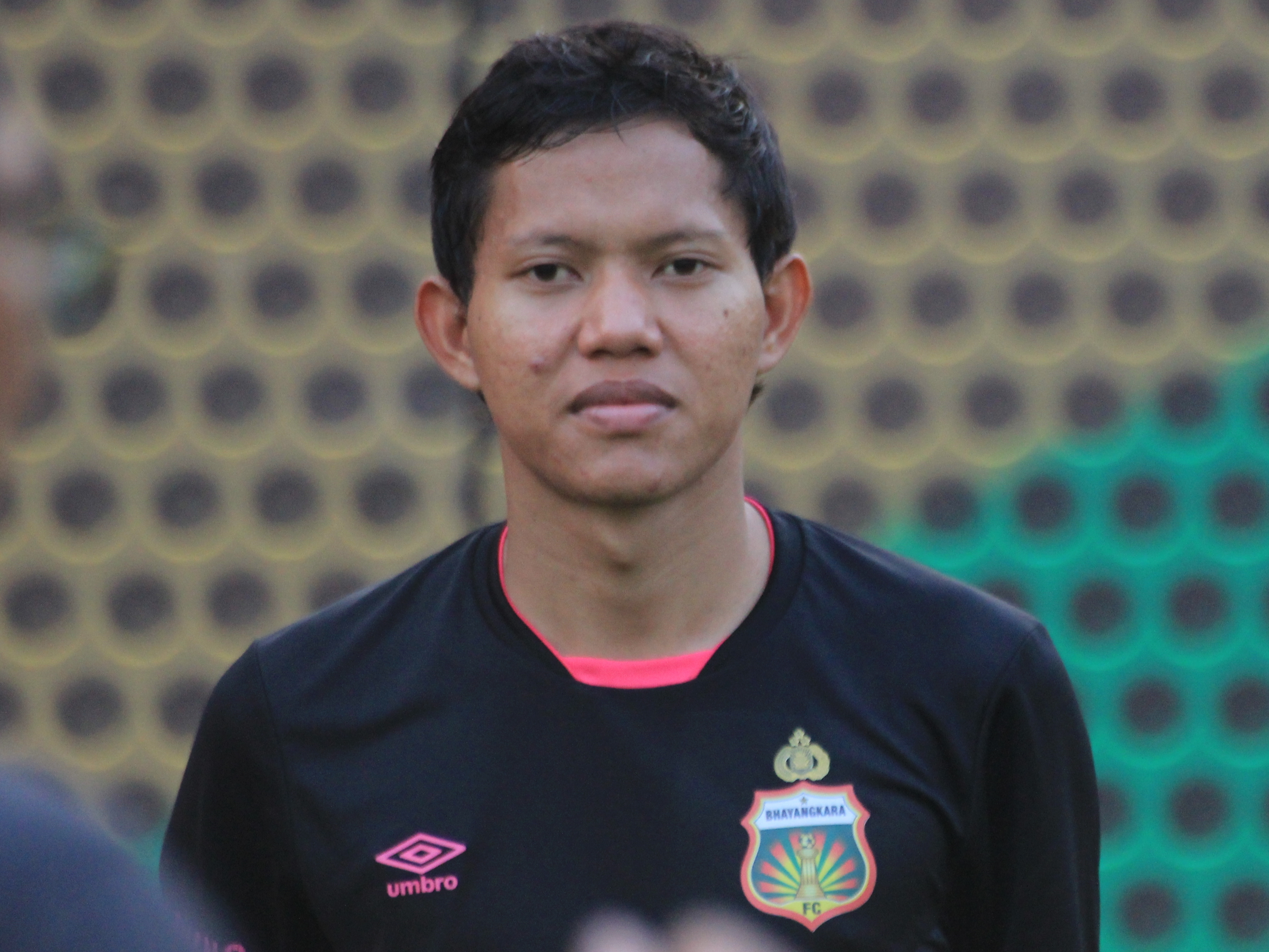
- Adam Alis with Bhayangkara in 2018

Personal information
- Full name: Adam Alis Setyano
- Date of birth: 19 December 1993 (age 32)
- Place of birth: Jakarta, Indonesia
- Height: 1.72 m (5 ft 8 in)
- Position: Midfielder

Team information
- Current team: Persib Bandung
- Number: 18

Youth career
- 2005–2010: ASIOP
- 2010–2011: Persija Jakarta

Senior career*
Years	Team	Apps	(Gls)
2011–2012	Persitangsel South Tangerang	8	(0)
2012–2013	Perserang Serang	16	(0)
2013–2014	Martapura	18	(2)
2015	Persija Jakarta	1	(0)
2015	East Riffa	6	(0)
2016	Barito Putera	34	(2)
2017	Arema	31	(1)
2018	Sriwijaya	15	(0)
2018–2022	Bhayangkara	72	(9)
2022–2023	Arema	18	(0)
2023–2024	Borneo Samarinda	52	(8)
2024	→ Persib Bandung (loan)	16	(1)
2025–	Persib Bandung	54	(6)

International career^{‡}
2015	Indonesia U23	14	(1)
2017–	Indonesia	11	(1)
- * Club domestic league appearances and goals as of 22 November 2026 ‡ National team caps and goals as of 19 January 2024

Adam Alis Setyano (born 19 December 1993) is an Indonesian professional footballer who plays as a midfielder for Super League club Persib Bandung and the Indonesia national team.

== Club career ==
=== Early career ===
After undergoing junior training at his hometown clubs, ASIOP and Persija Jakarta, Adam Alis failed to win a spot in the senior team of one of Indonesia's most famous clubs and played in the lower leagues until 2015 when he decided to accept an offer to play in Bahrain.

=== East Riffa ===
Adam Alis in 2015 played for Bahraini Premier League club East Riffa only for six matches amid his struggle to earn playing time. Despite the challenges, he managed to cut his teeth in Middle East football.

=== Barito Putera ===
After returning to Indonesia with international experience, Adam Alis in 2016 found a starting spot at a middling club in the top-tier of Indonesian football, Barito Putera, where he played in 34 matches and scored two goals. This turn of events improved his confidence to continue his footballing career.

=== Arema ===
Adam Alis rose to national prominence as an industrious attacking midfielder after he joined Arema in 2017 and participated in the 2017 Indonesia President's Cup, in which Arema became champion and he earned the title as the best player in the tournament that was a prelude to the 2017 Liga 1 season. The performance earned him a call to the senior national team.

On 15 April 2017, Adam made his league debut for the club in a match against Persib Bandung, playing the full 90 minute in a 0–0 draw. Eight days later, he assisted an opening goal by Dedik Setiawan in Arema's 2–0 win over Bhayangkara. On 18 August, he give two assists in a 3–0 home win over Persiba Balikpapan. On 30 August, he scored his first goal for Arema, as they drew 3–3 against PSM Makassar. On 11 November, he played his last match with Arema in a 2–3 loss to Borneo, Adam coming as a substitute in the 61st minute for Benny Wahyudi. In the 2017 season, Adam became one of the players who appeared most often for Arema, even though the coach changed to Joko Susilo. This season, Adam appeared in 31 matches and scored one goal.

=== Sriwijaya ===
With his popularity rising, Adam Alis for the 2018 Liga 1 season moved to Sriwijaya that wanted to reclaim its past glory when it was a feared top-flight club. The ambitious project of recruiting high-paid players ended up in disaster when the club hit financial trouble in the middle of the season and failed to pay salaries. A group of players, including Adam Alis, decided to leave the club after months of receiving no payment for their services that propelled the club to the third position in the table after 15 matches.

=== Bhayangkara ===
After the Sriwijaya debacle, Adam in July 2018 found a spot in Liga 1 club Bhayangkara, which was based in his hometown of Jakarta. Bhayangkara won the 2017 Liga 1 title a few months before he joined. Adam Alis has played more games at Bhayangkara than any previous club and decided to relocate his family to the Central Java city of Solo after the club opted to move its base there in order to capture more fans than in Jakarta where most football enthusiasts support Persija. On 21 July 2018, Adam made his Bhayangkara debut in a 2–3 win over Bali United at Kapten I Wayan Dipta Stadium. Adam give assists a goal by Herman Dzumafo in Bhayangkara's 2–1 away win over PSIS Semarang on 13 August. Adam give two assists in Bhayangkara's 2–2 draw over PS Barito Putera on 22 September and give another two assists in a 2–0 win over Sriwijaya on 12 October. Adam became a regular starter for Bhayangkara under coach Simon McMenemy, and saw an improvement in his performances for the side in the number of matches.

He scored his first goal for the side on 22 September 2019 in a 1–1 draw with Borneo. His form in November saw him score two further goals in win against Persipura Jayapura (1–3), and win against Arema (1–0). Adam, was named player of the month for November 2021. On 4 December, he scored the opening goal in a 3–0 over Persija Jakarta at PTIK Stadium. On 12 December, Adam scored equalizer in a 2–3 away win over Badak Lampung. He made 27 league appearances for Bhayangkara during the 2019 season scoring five goals; he only played twice in the 2020 season because the league was officially discontinued due to the COVID-19 pandemic.

On 6 November 2021, Adam scored his first league goal of the 2021–22 season, opening the scoring in a 2–0 win over PSM Makassar, with the result, brought Bhayangkara to 1st place league table. On 2 December, he scored a brace for the club in a 2–0 away win against Persipura, with the result, securing Bhayangkara's position at the top of the league table.

On 14 January 2022, he was involved in Bhayangkara's 2–3 win over Madura United, scoring a goal in the 73rd minute. Playing for Bhayangkara since 2018, he has scored a total of nine goals, his slick performance as an attacking midfielder often Paul Munster's being first choice. in the 2021–2022 season, he appeared in 26 matches with a total time of 1.610 minutes and scored four goals.

=== Return to Arema ===
On April 5 April 2022, Adam decided to sign a contract with his former club since 2017, Arema. He also brought Arema back to win the Indonesia President's Cup for the third time, for Adam, he has felt the title with Arema twice, after the last time happened in 2017. He made his league debut in a 0–3 lost against Borneo Samarinda on 24 July as a substitute in the 46th minute. Until the first round ended, he appeared in 18 matches, 2 assists and no goals, Adam became the fourth player to leave Arema for the second round. Previous, Hasyim Kipuw decided to Madura United, Irsyad Maulana and Hanis Sagara Putra to Persita Tangerang.

=== Borneo Samarinda ===
On 26 January 2023, he signed two-year contract with Liga 1 club Borneo Samarinda. Adam made his club debut four days later, coming on as a substitutes, scored his first league goal in 48th minute second half in a 2–0 win against Persik Kediri, the latter result saw Borneo Samarinda move to 4th position in the league table. On 16 February, Adam scored in a 3–1 home win against Persikabo 1973 at Segiri Stadium. On 3 March, Adam scored the winning goal in a 0–1 away win over Madura United. He added his fourth goals of the season on 12 March with one goal against PSIS Semarang in a 6–1 home win. On 9 April, Adam scored the opening goal in a 4–2 home win over RANS Nusantara.

== International career ==
Adam Alis made his international debut for the Indonesia national team on 8 June 2017 against Cambodia. On 25 May 2021, he scored a goal in a friendly match in Dubai against Afghanistan.

On 28 August 2023, Alis received a call-up to the national team after nearly two years since he last played for the team, for a friendly match against Turkmenistan, which ended up in a 2–0 win.

In January 2024, Alis was named in the 26-men squad for the 2023 AFC Asian Cup. He played just one game against Vietnam in a 1–0 win.

== Personal life ==
Adam Alis is a childhood Inter Milan fan, and said that it would be his dream to one day play for that club.

== Career statistics ==
=== Club ===
As of 25 October 2026

Club statistics
Club	Season	League			National Cup		League Cup		Continental		Other (Note: Appearances in Piala Presiden.)		Total	
Club	Season	Division	Apps	Goals	Apps	Goals	Apps	Goals	Apps	Goals	Apps	Goals	Apps	Goals
Martapura	2014	Premier Division	18	2	—		—		—		—		18	2
Persija Jakarta	2015	Indonesia Super League	1	0	0	0	—		—		—		1	0
East Riffa	2015–16	Bahraini Premier League	6	0	0	0	—		—		—		6	0
Barito Putera	2016	Indonesia Soccer Championship A	34	2	0	0	—		—		—		34	2
Arema	2017	Liga 1	31	1	0	0	—		—		7	1	38	2
Sriwijaya	2018	Liga 1	15	0	0	0	—		—		7	1	22	1
Bhayangkara	2018	Liga 1	17	0	0	0	—		—		—		17	0
Bhayangkara	2019	Liga 1	27	5	0	0	—		—		—		27	5
Bhayangkara	2020	Liga 1	2	0	0	0	—		—		—		2	0
Bhayangkara	2021–22	Liga 1	26	4	0	0	—		—		2 (Note: Appearances in Menpora Cup.)	0	28	4
Bhayangkara	Total		72	9	0	0			—		2	0	74	9
Arema	2022–23	Liga 1	18	0	0	0	—		—		8	0	26	0
Borneo Samarinda	2022–23	Liga 1	15	5	0	0	—		—		0	0	15	5
Borneo Samarinda	2023–24	Liga 1	37	3	0	0	—		—		0	0	37	3
Persib Bandung (loan)	2024–25	Liga 1	16	1	0	0	—		5 (Note: Appearances in AFC Champions League Two)	0	0	0	21	1
Persib Bandung	2024–25	Liga 1	17	1	0	0	—		0	0	0	0	17	1
Persib Bandung	2025–26	Super League	28	4	0	0	—		7	3	0	0	35	7
Persib Bandung	2026–27	Super League	9	1	0	0	0	0	5	0	2	1	16	2
Career total			317	29	0	0	0	0	16	3	25	2	358	35

=== International ===
As of match played 19 January 2024

Appearances and goals by national team and year
National team	Year	Apps	Goals
Indonesia	2017	2	0
Indonesia	2021	5	1
Indonesia	2023	2	0
Indonesia	2024	2	0
Total		11	1

As of match played 19 January 2024
Scores and results list Indonesia's goal tally first, score column indicates score after each Adam Alis goal.

List of international goals scored by Adam Alis
No.	Date	Venue	Cap	Opponent	Score	Result	Competition
1	25 May 2021	Jebel Ali Centre of Excellent, Dubai, United Arab Emirates	3	Afghanistan	2–3	2–3	Friendly

== Honours ==
Arema

- Piala Presiden: 2017, 2022

Sriwijaya

- East Kalimantan Governor Cup: 2018

Borneo Samarinda

- Liga 1 Premiership: 2023–24

Persib Bandung

- Liga 1/Super League: 2024–25, 2025–26
- Piala Presiden runner-up: 2026

Individual

- Indonesia President's Cup Best Player: 2017
- Liga 1 Player of the Month: November 2021
