= 2015–16 Bahrain First Division League =

Bahrain First Division League
- Season: 2015–16
- Champions: Al-Hidd (1st title)
- Relegated: Busaiteen; Sitra Club
- AFC Champions League: Al-Hidd
- AFC Cup: Al-Muharraq
- GCC Champions League: Malkiya Club
- Goals: 235
- Average goals/game: 2.6
- Top goalscorer: Ismail Abdullatif; Mohammad Saad Al-Rumaihi (17 goals)
- Biggest home win: Al-Hidd 5-0 Busaiteen
- Biggest away win: Manama 0-5 Al-Hidd
- Highest scoring: Al-Hidd (39 goals)
- Longest winning run: Malkiya (4 wins)
- Longest unbeaten run: Al-Hidd (18 games)
- Longest losing run: Manama (6 losses)

The 2015–16 Bahraini First Division League was the 59th top-level football season in Bahrain. Fourteen teams participated. Muharraq was the defending champions after securing their thirty-third championship the previous season.

The league began on 26 October 2015.

== Teams ==
Bahrain SC and Al-Shabab were relegated at the end of the previous campaign and replaced by Al-Ahli and Sitra. Sitra Club bounced back after one season away from the top flight and Al-Ahli were back after spending 4 years in the second tier.

=== Stadia and locations ===
Locations of teams in the 2015–16 Bahraini League

Club	Location	Manager
Al-Ahli Club (Manama)	Manama	(Bahrain) Adnan Ibrahim
Al Hidd	Al Hidd	(Bahrain) Salman Shareeda
Al Hala	Muharraq	(Bahrain) Mohammad Zwayed
Al-Muharraq	Muharraq	(Bahrain) Essa Al-Saadoun
Busaiteen Club	Busaiteen	(Bahrain) Khalifa Al-Ziani
East Riffa Club	Manama	(Bahrain) Mohammad Shamlan
Malkiya	Malkiya	(Bahrain) Ahmad Saleh Al-Dakhil
Manama Club	Manama	(Bahrain) Khaled Taj
Riffa S.C.	Riffa	(Bahrain) Ahmad Essa
Sitra Club	Sitra	(Bahrain) Khaled Al-Harban

- Although most clubs do have a stadium, all games are actually played at the National Stadium, Khalifa Sports City Stadium and in Al Ahli Stadium. Games are normally played as back to back headers.

=== Managerial changes ===
Team	Outgoing manager	Manner of departure	Date of vacancy	Position in table	Incoming manager	Date of appointment
Muharraq	(Serbia) Dragan Cvetkovic	Sacked	8 October 2015	Pre-Season	(Bahrain) Khaled Taj	10 October 2015
Manama	(Spain) Miguel Olmo Forte	Sacked	28 October 2015	9th	(Bahrain) Ismaeel Karami	28 October 2015
Riffa	(Bahrain) Mohammad Al-Shamlan	Sacked	29 November 2015	8th	(Tunisia) Samir bin Shammam	29 November 2015
Manama	(Bahrain) Ismaeel Karami	Replaced by Chokri Bejaoui	10 December 2015	10th	(Tunisia) Chokri Bejaoui	10 December 2015
East Riffa	(Bahrain) Essa Al-Saadoun	Resigned	27 January 2016	4th	(Bahrain) Mohammad Shamlan	28 January 2016
Muharraq	(Bahrain) Khaled Taj	Sacked	1 February 2016	2nd	(Bahrain) Essa Al-Saadoun	2 February 2016
Manama	(Tunisia) Chokri Bejaoui	Sacked	11 April 2016	10th	(Bahrain) Khaled Taj	11 April 2016
Riffa	(Tunisia) Samir bin Chammam	Sacked	2 May 2016	4th	(Bahrain) Ahmad Essa	2 May 2016

=== Foreign players ===
Club	Player 1	Player 2	Player 3	Asian Player	Former Player(s)
Al-Ahli	(Brazil) Cleiton Mineiro	(Brazil) Diego Silva		(Palestine) Imad Zatara	(Ivory Coast) Cedric Fein (Tajikistan) Manuchehr Akhmadov
Al-Hala	(Brazil) João Luiz				(Nigeria) Nasigba John-Jumbo (Portugal) José Coelho
Al-Hidd	(Nigeria) Ifedayo Olusegun	(Nigeria) Orok Akarandut	(Nigeria) Uche Agba	(Jordan) Mohammad Al Daoud	
Al-Muharraq	(Brazil) Felipinho	(Brazil) Kanú	(Sweden) Admir Ćatović	(Uzbekistan) Shohrux Gadoyev	(Algeria) Karim Boutadjine (Syria) Hamdi Al Masri
Busaiteen Club	(Brazil) Ozéia	(Brazil) Rico		(Syria) Israa Hamwiah	(Brazil) Eliel Cruz
East Riffa Club	(Equatorial Guinea) Ben Konaté	(Mali) Eliassou Issiaka	(Romania) Valentin Lemnaru	(Yemen) Mudir Al-Radaei	(Indonesia) Adam Alis
Malkiya	(Moldova) Victor Gonța				
Manama Club	(Brazil) Diego Barboza	(Montenegro) Bojan Božović			(Brazil) Leomar
Riffa SC	(Brazil) Léo Bahia	(Ghana) Moussa Narry	(Nigeria) Onuoha Ogbonna	(Syria) Ahmad Al Douni	(Jordan) Khalil Bani Attiah
Sitra Club	(Brazil) Márcio Teruel			(Kyrgyzstan) Azamat Baymatov	

== League table ==
Pos	Team	Pld	W	D	L	GF	GA	GD	Pts	Qualification or relegation
1	Al Hidd (C)	18	12	6	0	39	15	+24	42	Qualification to the 2017 AFC Champions League preliminary round 2
2	Al-Muharraq	18	9	5	4	31	21	+10	32	Qualification to the 2017 AFC Cup group stage (Note: Muharraq qualified for 2017 AFC Cup Group Stage as winners of 2015–16 Bahraini King's Cup.)
3	Malkiya	18	7	6	5	23	20	+3	27	Qualification to the 2017 GCC Champions League Group Stage
4	Al-Riffa	18	7	2	9	22	26	−4	23	
5	East Riffa	18	6	4	8	22	18	+4	22	
6	Al-Ahli	18	5	7	6	22	21	+1	22	
7	Manama Club	18	6	3	9	17	27	−10	21	
8	Al Hala	18	5	5	8	22	31	−9	20	
9	Busaiteen (R)	18	6	2	10	17	31	−14	20	Relegation to the 2016–17 Bahraini Second Division
10	Sitra (R)	18	4	6	8	20	25	−5	18	Relegation to the 2016–17 Bahraini Second Division

Updated to match(es) played on 23 April 2016. Source:
Rules for classification: 1) points; 2) goal difference; 3) number of goals scored.
(C) Champions; (R) Relegated

== Season statistics ==
=== Goalscorers ===
As of matches played 26 April 2016

Rank	Player	Club	Goals
1	(Bahrain) Mohammad Saad Al-Rumaihi	Al Hidd	17
1	(Bahrain) Ismail Abdullatif	Muharraq	17
2	(Bahrain) Essa Abdulwahab Al-Beri	Malkiya	10
3	(Bahrain) Ali Al-Asfour	Sitra	7
3	(Bahrain) Sami Al-Husaini	East Riffa	7
3	(Brazil) Diego Pelicles da Silva	Al-Ahli	7

=== Hat-tricks ===
Player	For	Against	Result	Date
(Bahrain) Ismail Abdullatif	Muharraq	Hala	3–0	22 April 2016
(Bahrain) Ismail Abdullatif	Muharraq	Riffa	3–3	18 May 2016
