= Agustiar =

Agustiar is an Indonesian name. Notable people with the name include:

- Agustiar Batubara (born 1978), Indonesian footballer
- Andre Agustiar (born 1996), Indonesian footballer
