= Yusgiantoro =

Yusgiantoro is an Indonesian surname. Notable people with the surname include:

- Arsyad Yusgiantoro (born 1996), Indonesian footballer
- Purnomo Yusgiantoro (born 1951), Indonesian politician
