= Osvaldo Lessa =

Brazilian football manager

Personal information
- Full name: Osvaldo Lessa Filho
- Date of birth: 23 September 1966 (age 60)
- Place of birth: Rio de Janeiro, Brazil
- Height: 1.83 m (6 ft 0 in)

Managerial career
- Years: Team
- 2007–2009: Al-Ta'ee (Fitness coach)
- 2009–2015: Persipura Jayapura (Fitness coach)
- 2015–2016: Persipura Jayapura
- 2016–2017: Madura United (Assistant and physio)
- 2017: Sriwijaya
- 2018–2019: Persipura Jayapura
- 2020: Persija Jakarta (Interpreter)
- 2021–: Madura United (Fitness Coach)

Osvaldo Lessa Filho (born 23 September 1966 in Rio de Janeiro) is a Brazilian football manager.

Temporarily while in charge of Persipura, he went back to his native Brazil for a coaching course.

== Coaching career ==
=== Persipura Jayapura ===
Lessa was given the Persipura Jayapura job in 2015 and replaced Jacksen F. Tiago as manager. He won the 2015 Indonesia Super League and the 2015 AFC Cup in order to stay as manager. Instead, he steered them to a second-place finish in the league and a round-of-16 exit in the AFC Cup. By January 2016, they had requested that he leave Persipura and in March the Brazilian felt some trepidation over a possible dismissal after tying with Arema Cronus and finishing bottom in Group B of the 2016 Bhayangkara Cup. On top of that, former footballer Nico Dimo advised the board to entrust the management to Mettu Dwaramury, Chris Leo Yarangga and Fernado Fairio instead as well. Finally, the tactician was relieved of his duties in the beginning of April 2016.

=== Madura United and Sriwijaya ===
Soon after, Lessa joined Madura United, where he served as the physiotherapist and assistant manager. Eventually, he left them too in 2017.

In April 2017, the Rio de Janeiro native was handed the Sriwijaya F.C. coaching job as the club had shown interest in appointing him by March. He usually uses the 4-3-3 formation in games.

Recording three straight losses in a row in 2017, Lessa was chastised by the Sriwijaya board but was given an opportunity to redeem himself in the fifth round against Mitra Kukar which he won 3–1. Supposing they lost, the former physiotherapist could conceivably have been fired by the club's management prematurely.

On 17 June 2017, Lessa was ousted from his job by the club and Hartono Ruslan replaced him as caretaker coach.
