= Esteban Vizcarra =

Indonesian footballer

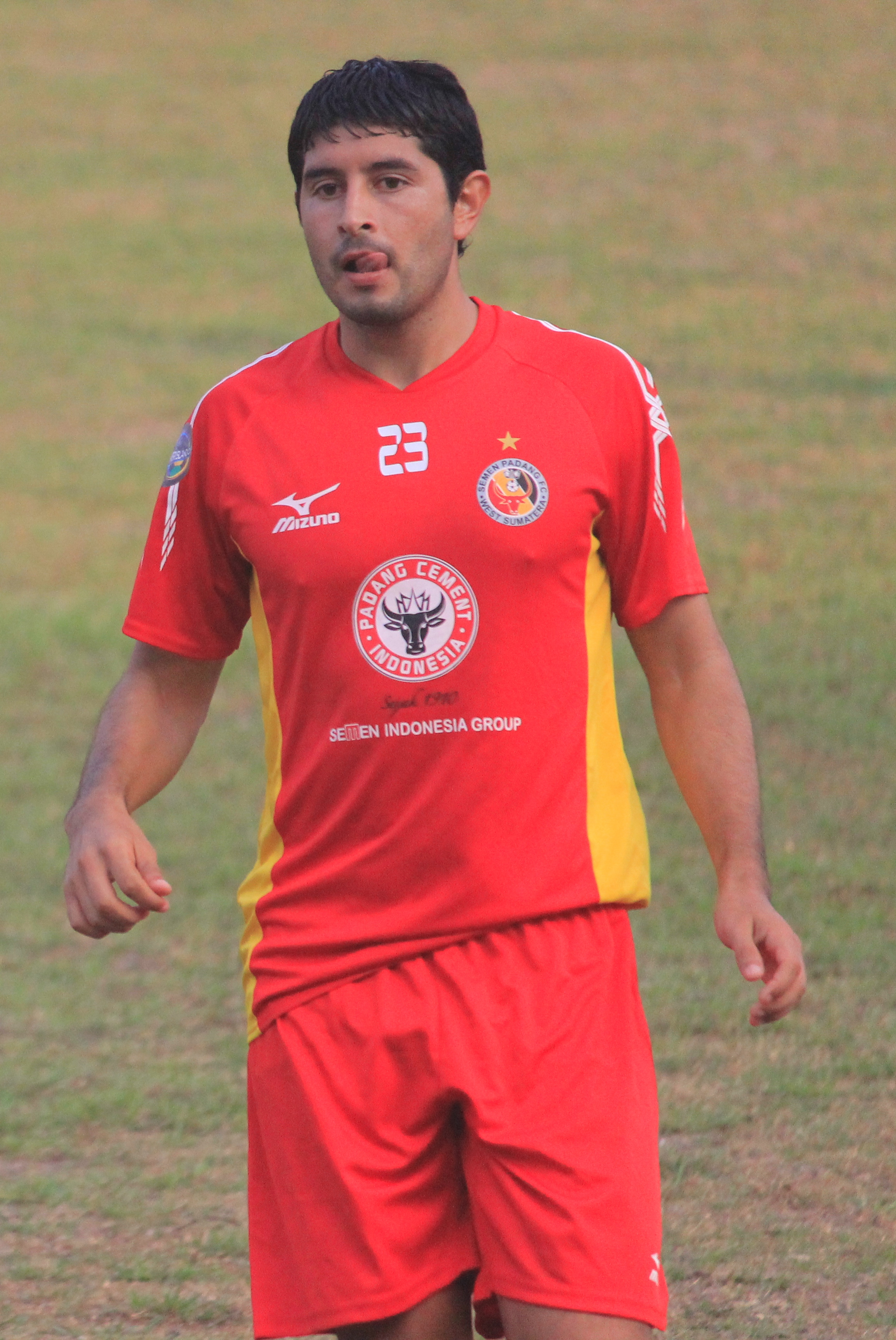
- Vizcarra playing for Semen Padang in 2013

Personal information
- Full name: Esteban Gabriel Vizcarra
- Date of birth: 11 April 1986 (age 40)
- Place of birth: Belén de Escobar, Argentina
- Height: 1.75 m (5 ft 9 in)
- Positions: Winger; attacking midfielder

Team information
- Current team: Semen Padang
- Number: 23

Senior career*
Years	Team	Apps	(Gls)
2005–2008	Huracán	40	(19)
2008–2009	Douglas Haig	15	(3)
2009–2010	Pelita Jaya	30	(12)
2010–2015	Semen Padang	94	(26)
2015–2017	Arema	60	(14)
2017–2019	Sriwijaya	32	(11)
2019–2022	Persib Bandung	48	(3)
2022–2023	Madura United	28	(1)
2023–2024	PSS Sleman	32	(7)
2024–2025	Persela Lamongan	19	(2)
2026	PSIS Semarang	12	(1)
2026–	Semen Padang	0	(0)

International career
2018	Indonesia	1	(0)
- * Club domestic league appearances and goals as of 3 May 2026

Esteban Gabriel Vizcarra (born 11 April 1986) is a professional footballer who plays as a winger or an attacking midfielder for Championship club Semen Padang. Born in Argentina, he represented Indonesia at international level.

== Club career ==
Vizcarra previously played for Pelita Jaya, Spanish club CD Salobreña and in his native Argentina for Douglas Haig and Huracán.

On 3 November 2014, he signed for Semen Padang. In January 2019, Vizcarra joined Persib Bandung, signing a one-year contract with a renewal option.

== International career ==
After living in Indonesia since 2009, Vizcarra went through naturalization process to be an Indonesian citizen on 16 March 2018. Vizcarra made his debut for Indonesia on 10 October 2018 in a friendly against Myanmar.

== Career statistics ==
=== Club ===
As of 3 May 2026

Club	Season	League		Cup		Continental		Other (Note: Appearances in Indonesia President's Cup)		Total	
Club	Season	Apps	Goals	Apps	Goals	Apps	Goals	Apps	Goals	Apps	Goals
Pelita Jaya	2009–10	30	12	0	0	–		0	0	30	12
Semen Padang	2010–11	29	3	0	0	–		0	0	29	3
Semen Padang	2011–12	22	5	0	0	–		0	0	22	5
Semen Padang	2013	16	8	0	0	6 (Note: Appearances in AFC Cup)	0	0	0	22	8
Semen Padang	2014	26	10	0	0	–		0	0	26	10
Semen Padang	2015	1	0	0	0	–		0	0	1	0
Semen Padang	Total	94	26	0	0	6	0	0	0	100	26
Arema	2016	31	7	0	0	–		0	0	31	7
Arema	2017	29	7	0	0	–		7	2	36	9
Arema	Total	60	14	0	0	0	0	7	2	67	16
Sriwijaya	2018	32	11	0	0	–		4	1	36	12
Persib Bandung	2019	27	3	1 (Note: Includes Piala Indonesia)	0	–		1	0	29	3
Persib Bandung	2020	3	0	0	0	–		0	0	3	0
Persib Bandung	2021–22	18	0	0	0	–		7 (Note: Appearances in Menpora Cup)	1	25	1
Persib Bandung	Total	48	3	1	0	0	0	7	1	56	4
Madura United	2022–23	28	1	0	0	–		4	0	32	1
PSS Sleman	2023–24	32	7	0	0	–		0	0	32	7
Persela Lamongan	2024–25	13	1	0	0	–		0	0	13	1
Persela Lamongan	2025–26	6	1	0	0	–		0	0	6	1
PSIS Semarang	2025–26	12	1	0	0	–		0	0	12	1
Career total		355	77	1	0	6	0	23	4	385	81

=== International ===
As of match played 10 October 2018

Appearances and goals by national team and year
National team	Year	Apps	Goals
Indonesia	2018	1	0
Total		1	0

== Honours ==
Semen Padang

- Indonesia Premier League: 2011–12
- Indonesian Community Shield: 2013
- Piala Indonesia runner-up: 2012

Arema

- Indonesia President's Cup: 2017

Sriwijaya

- East Kalimantan Governor's Cup: 2018

== See also ==
- List of Indonesia international footballers born outside Indonesia
