= Beny Wahyudi =

Indonesian footballer

Personal information
- Full name: Beny Wahyudi
- Date of birth: 20 March 1986 (age 40)
- Place of birth: Malang, Indonesia
- Height: 1.70 m (5 ft 7 in)
- Position: Full-back

Team information
- Current team: Persekam Metro (assistant coach)

Youth career
- 2000–2004: Arema Malang

Senior career*
| Years | Team | Apps | (Gls) |
| 2005–2006 | Persekabpas Pasuruan | 18 | (0) |
| 2006–2007 | Persekam Metro | 20 | (0) |
| 2007–2008 | Persewangi Banyuwangi | 22 | (1) |
| 2008–2011 | Arema Cronus | 55 | (0) |
| 2011–2012 | Deltras Sidoarjo | 26 | (0) |
| 2013–2017 | Arema | 79 | (0) |
| 2018 | Madura United | 24 | (0) |
| 2019 | PSM Makassar | 28 | (0) |
| 2020–2021 | PSIM Yogyakarta | 12 | (0) |
| 2022 | PSIS Semarang | 3 | (0) |
| 2022–2023 | Deltras | 4 | (0) |
| 2023–2024 | Persikab Bandung | 14 | (0) |
| Total | | 305 | (1) |

International career
| 2010–2017 | Indonesia | 27 | (0) |

Managerial career
- 2025–: Persekam Metro (assistant coach)
Medal record
Men's football
Representing Indonesia
AFF Championship
| Runner-up | 2010 Indonesia & Vietnam | Team |
| Runner-up | 2016 Myanmar & Philippines | Team |
- * Club domestic league appearances and goals

Beny Wahyudi (born 20 March 1986) is an Indonesian former footballer who plays as a full-back. Currently he is the assistant coach of Persekam Metro.

== Career ==
Beny played primarily as a right-back and had been a member of the national team since 2010. During the 2010 AFF Championship, he was deployed as a left-back, while in the 2016 AFF Championship he operated as a right-back, Beny, together with Boaz Solossa announced their intention for retirement from the national squad, citing due to the failure as well for their age factor. However, Boaz still disclosed his intention to retire, saying he want to discuss the matter with his family first while celebrating Christmas in his hometown of Sorong. Beny officially retired from the national team on 29 December 2016.

== Career statistics ==
=== International ===
Appearances and goals by national team and year
| National team | Year | Apps | Goals |
|---|---|---|---|
| Indonesia | 2010 | 7 | 0 |
| Indonesia | 2011 | 5 | 0 |
| Indonesia | 2013 | 2 | 0 |
| Indonesia | 2016 | 11 | 0 |
| Indonesia | 2017 | 2 | 0 |
| Total | | 27 | 0 |

== Honours ==
=== Club honors ===
Arema

- Indonesia Super League: 2009–10
- East Java Governor Cup: 2013
- Menpora Cup: 2013
- Indonesian Inter Island Cup: 2014/15
- Indonesia President's Cup: 2017
- Piala Indonesia runner-up: 2010

PSM Makassar

- Piala Indonesia: 2018–19

=== Country honours ===
Indonesia

- AFF Championship runner-up: 2010, 2016
