= Andre Agustiar =

Indonesian association football player

Personal information
- Full name: Andre Agustiar Prakoso
- Date of birth: 24 April 1996 (age 30)
- Place of birth: Kediri, Indonesia
- Height: 1.72 m (5 ft 8 in)
- Positions: Right winger; right-back

Team information
- Current team: Persedikab Kediri
- Number: 16

Youth career
- 2013–2015: Persedikab Kediri

Senior career*
Years	Team	Apps	(Gls)
2016	Persik Kediri	8	(1)
2017–2019	Mitra Kukar	61	(3)
2020	Badak Lampung	1	(0)
2021–2022	Persita Tangerang	24	(3)
2022	PSIM Yogyakarta	7	(0)
2023–2024	Bekasi City	5	(0)
2025	Inter Kediri	3	(0)
2025–	Persedikab Kediri	0	(0)
- * Club domestic league appearances and goals as of 26 April 2025

Andre Agustiar Prakoso (born 24 April 1996), is an Indonesian professional footballer who plays as a right winger or right-back for Liga 4 club Inter Kediri.

== Club career ==
=== Mitra Kukar ===
In 2017, Agustiar signed a year contract with Mitra Kukar. He made his league debut on 15 April 2017 in a match against Barito Putera. On 3 September 2017, Agustiar scored his first goal for Mitra Kukar against Madura United in the 84th minute at the Aji Imbut Stadium, Tenggarong.

=== Badak Lampung ===
He was signed for Badak Lampung to play in Liga 2 in the 2020 season. This season was suspended on 27 March 2020 due to the COVID-19 pandemic. The season was abandoned and was declared void on 20 January 2021.

=== Persita Tangerang ===
In 2021, Agustiar signed a contract with Indonesian Liga 1 club Persita Tangerang. He made his debut on 2 October 2021 in a match against Borneo at the Pakansari Stadium, Cibinong. Andre scored his first goal for Persita against PSIS Semarang in the 46th minute at the Sultan Agung Stadium, Bantul.

=== PSIM Yogyakarta ===
Agustiar was signed for PSIM Yogyakarta to play in Liga 2 in the 2022–23 season. He made his league debut on 18 August 2022 in a match against PSKC Cimahi at the Si Jalak Harupat Stadium, Soreang.
