= Liestiadi =

Indonesian former football player (born 1968)

Personal information
- Full name: Ir. Liestiadi
- Date of birth: 14 October 1968 (age 58)
- Place of birth: Medan, Indonesia
- Position: Midfielder

Team information
- Current team: PS Kwarta Deli Serdang (Head Coach)

Youth career
- 1989–1992: North Sumatra Student Team

Senior career*
Years	Team	Apps	(Gls)
1987–1997	PS Kejora		

Managerial career
- 1999: SSB Taman Setia Budi
- 2000: PSMS Medan Junior
- 2009: PSMS Medan (Technical Director)
- 2009: PSMS Medan
- 2009–2010: Arema Cronus (Assistant)
- 2011: PSM Makassar (Assistant)
- 2011–2013: Indonesia (Assistant)
- 2011–2013: Indonesia U23 (Assistant)
- 2011–2013: Indonesia U21 (Assistant)
- 2011–2013: Indonesia U19
- 2014: Persiba Balikpapan
- 2015–2016: Gresik United
- 2017: Persipura Jayapura
- 2019: Bandung United
- 2019–2020: PSIM Yogyakarta
- 2021–2022: Persikabo 1973
- 2022–2023: Sriwijaya
- 2025–: PS Kwarta Deli Serdang (Youth)
- * Club domestic league appearances and goals

Liestiadi (born 14 October 1968) is an Indonesian former football player. He currently coached for youth team of PS Kwarta Deli Serdang.

== Personal life ==
Before getting into coaching, he was a computer teacher in SMA Sutomo in Medan. He holds a Bachelor of Information Technology degree from Institut Teknologi TD Pardede.

== Coaching career ==
During his time at Arema as Robert Alberts assistant, he won the 2009–10 Indonesia Super League. He was appointed as the assistant for the Indonesia national football team in 2011 and also for several youth national teams.

On 26 November 2014, he signed with Gresik United to coach them for the 2015 Indonesia Super League.

Since 2008, he holds the AFC A coaching licence.
