= Chokri Bejaoui =

Tunisian football manager

Personal information
- Date of birth: 25 January 1967 (age 59)

Managerial career
- Years: Team
- 2007: Menzel Abderrahmane
- 2012: AS Ariana
- 2012–2013: CA Bizertin (assistant)
- 2013–2014: Al-Shabab Club
- 2014–2015: Al Hidd
- 2015–2016: Manama Club
- 2016–2017: SA Menzel Bourguiba
- 2017: AS Djerba
- 2017–2018: US Tataouine
- 2018: CS Chebba
- 2018–2019: Olympique Béja
- 2019: CA Bizertin

Chokri Bejaoui (born 25 January 1967) is a Tunisian football manager.
