= Imam Bagus =

Indonesian footballer

Personal information
- Full name: Imam Bagus Kurnia
- Date of birth: 22 July 1995 (age 31)
- Place of birth: Bangkalan, Indonesia
- Height: 1.75 m (5 ft 9 in)
- Position: Winger

Youth career
- SSB Garuda Jaya
- Perseba Bangkalan
- Bajul Ijo Surabaya
- 2016: PS TNI

Senior career*
Years	Team	Apps	(Gls)
2013	Persibas Banyumas		
2014	Laga	11	(4)
2015	Perseba Bangkalan	0	(0)
2016	PSMS Medan	12	(3)
2017	PSS Sleman	14	(2)
2018	Madura United	8	(0)
2019	PSCS Cilacap	13	(4)
2020–2021	Sriwijaya	11	(1)
2022	Gresik United	5	(0)
2023–2024	Persipa Pati	17	(4)
2024–2025	PSMS Medan	8	(1)
2026	Persiku Kudus	13	(2)
- * Club domestic league appearances and goals as of 3 May 2026

Imam Bagus Kurnia (born 22 July 1995) is an Indonesian professional footballer who plays as a winger.

== Club career ==
=== Madura United ===
In 2018, Imam Bagus signed a contract with Indonesian Liga 1 club Madura United. He made his league debut on 19 May 2018 in a match against Persipura Jayapura at the Mandala Stadium, Jayapura.

=== PSCS Cilacap ===
In 2019 Imam Bagus signed with PSCS Cilacap for the 2019 Liga 2. He made 13 league appearances and scored 4 goals for PSCS Cilacap.

=== Sriwijaya ===
He was signed for Sriwijaya to play in Liga 2 in the 2020 season. This season was suspended on 27 March 2020 due to the COVID-19 pandemic. The season was abandoned and was declared void on 20 January 2021.

=== Gresik United ===
Imam Bagus was signed for Gresik United to play in Liga 2 in the 2022–23 season.

== Career statistics ==
=== Club ===
As of match played 3 May 2026.

Club	Season	League			Cup		Other		Total	
Club	Season	Division	Apps	Goals	Apps	Goals	Apps	Goals	Apps	Goals
Laga	2014	Liga Nusantara	11	4	0	0	0	0	11	4
Perseba Bangkalan	2015	Liga Nusantara	0	0	0	0	0	0	0	0
PSMS Medan	2016	ISC B	12	3	0	0	0	0	12	3
PSS Sleman	2017	Liga 2	14	2	0	0	0	0	14	2
Madura United	2018	Liga 1	8	0	0	0	0	0	8	0
PSCS Cilacap	2019	Liga 2	13	4	0	0	0	0	13	4
Sriwijaya	2020–21	Liga 2	0	0	0	0	0	0	0	0
Sriwijaya	2021	Liga 2	11	1	0	0	0	0	11	1
Gresik United	2022–23	Liga 2	5	0	0	0	0	0	5	0
Persipa Pati	2023–24	Liga 2	17	4	0	0	0	0	17	4
PSMS Medan	2024–25	Liga 2	8	1	0	0	0	0	8	1
Persiku Kudus	2025–26	Championship	13	2	0	0	0	0	13	2
Career total			112	21	0	0	0	0	112	21

== Honours ==
=== Club ===
PS TNI U-21

- Indonesia Soccer Championship U-21: 2016

=== Individual ===
- Liga Nusantara Top Goalscorer: 2014 (4 goals)
