= Pakansari Stadium =

Multi-purpose stadium in Indonesia

- Stadion Pakansari
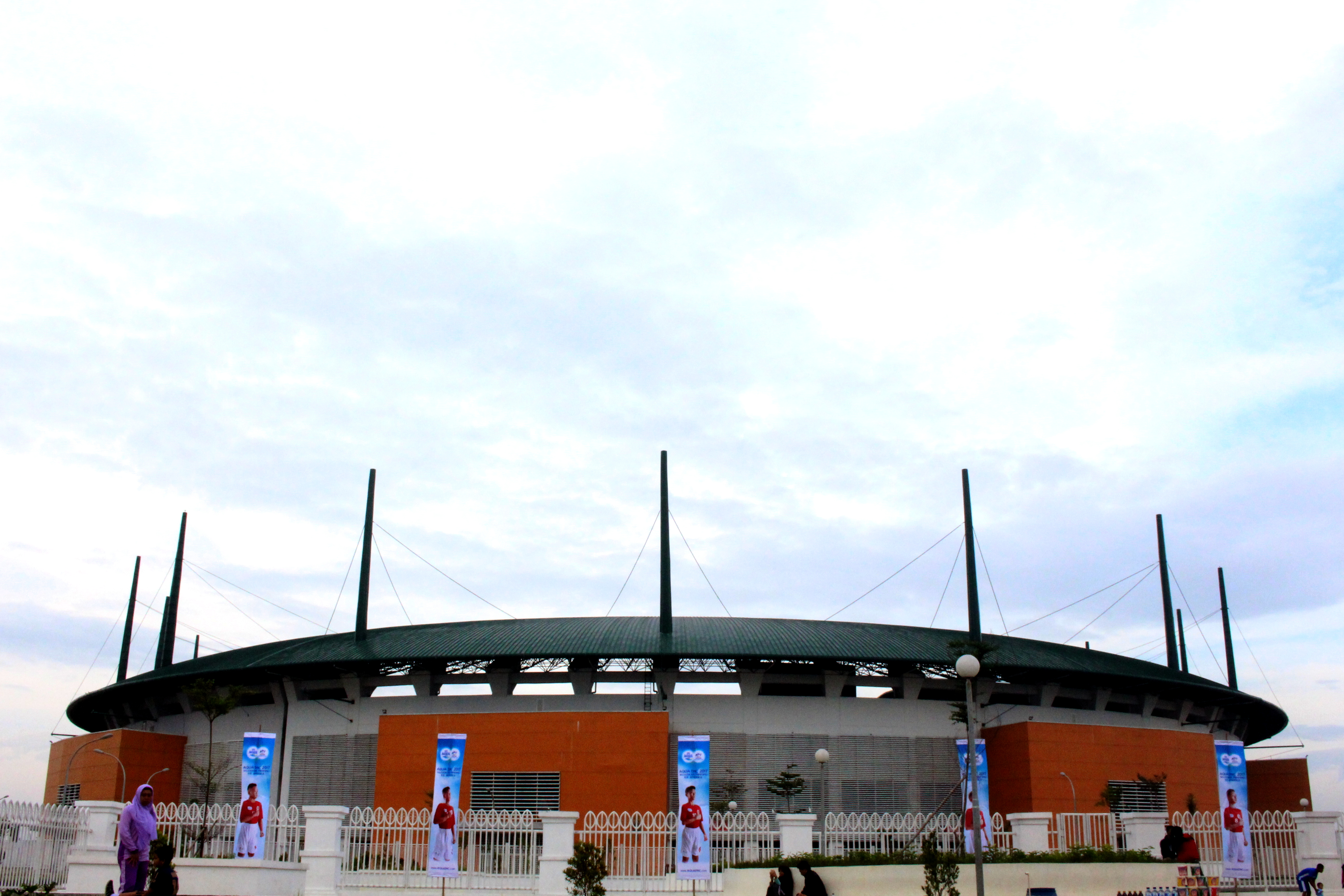

- Location in Bogor Regency
- Location: Cibinong, Bogor Regency, West Java, Indonesia
- Coordinates: 6°29′42.0″S 106°50′00.1″E
- Owner: Bogor Regency Government
- Operator: Bogor Regency Government
- Capacity: 30,000
- Surface: Bermuda grass

Construction
- Opened: 2015
- Renovated: 2023–

Tenants
- Persikabo 1973; RANS Nusantara; Dewa United (temporary); Persita Tangerang (temporary)

Pakansari Stadium (Indonesian: Stadion Pakansari) is an all-seater stadium at Pakansari, Cibinong, Bogor Regency, West Java in Indonesia. It is mostly used for football matches and is the home stadium of Persikabo 1973. It can hold 30,000 spectators. The stadium is one of the venues for men's football in the 2018 Asian Games and 2018 AFC U-19 Championship.

== History ==
Stadion Pakansari is an all-seater stadium located in Bogor Regency in the West Java province of Indonesia. It was opened in 2015. Indonesia played their 2016 AFF Championship semifinal and final matches here in Pakansari because of the renovations at GBK. The stadium hosted the 2017 President's Cup final. It also hosted the 2018 Asian Games men's football gold medal match and the 2018 AFC U-19 Championship final. It is the home of Liga 1 club TIRA-Persikabo. It will also acted as the home ground for the Indonesia for the 2026 ASEAN Championship.

PSM Makassar played their 2019 AFC Cup matches here in Stadion Pakansari as their permanent home.

== International football matches ==
| Date | Team 1 | Score | Team 2 | Competition | Attendances |
|---|---|---|---|---|---|
| 21 March 2017 | Indonesia | 1–3 | Myanmar | Friendly | 13,150 |
| 27 September 2022 | Indonesia | 2–1 | Curaçao | Friendly | 21,819 |

=== Football tournaments hosted ===
- 2016 AFF Championship
- 2017 Indonesia President's Cup Third places and Final.
- 2018 PSSI Anniversary Cup
- 2018 Asian Games Men's Football
- 2018 AFC U-19 Championship
- 2026 ASEAN Championship

== Gallery ==
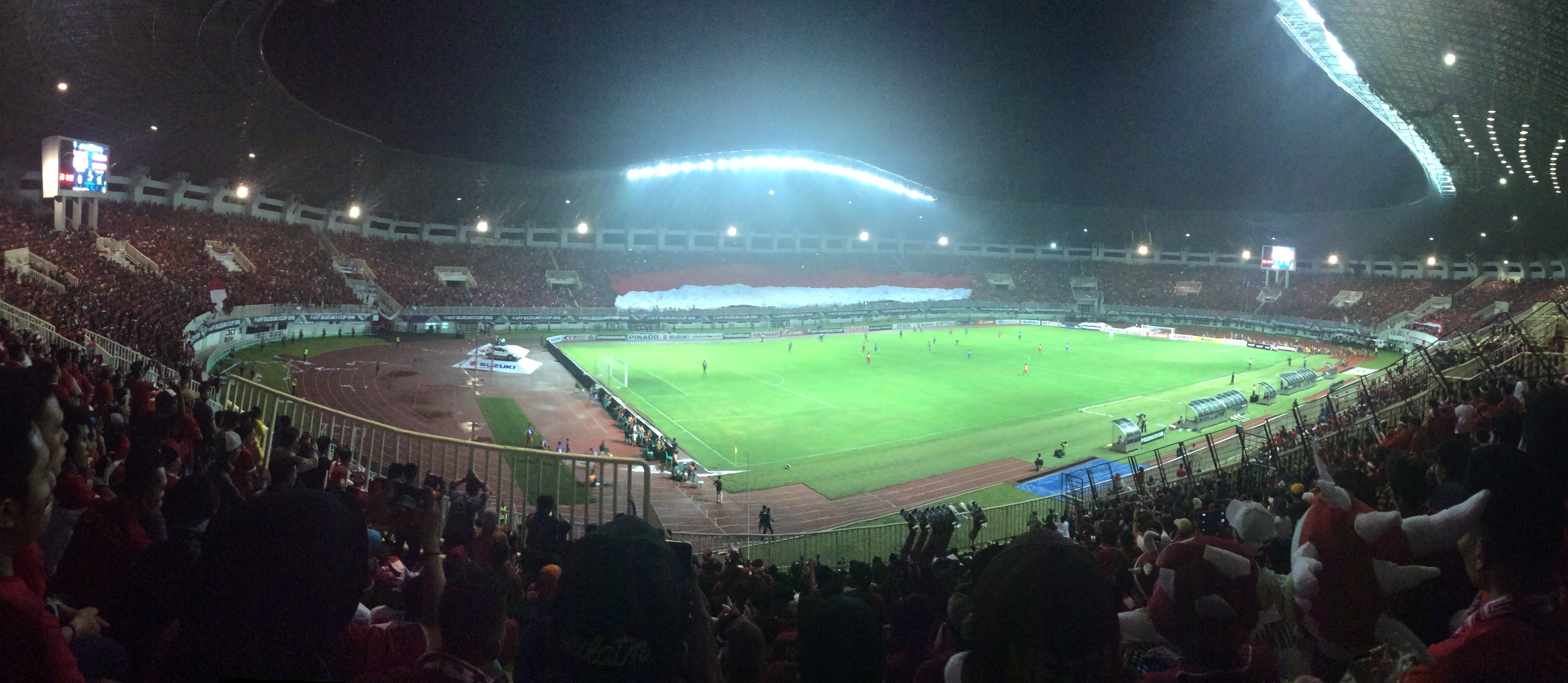
The stadium hosting the 2016 AFF Championship

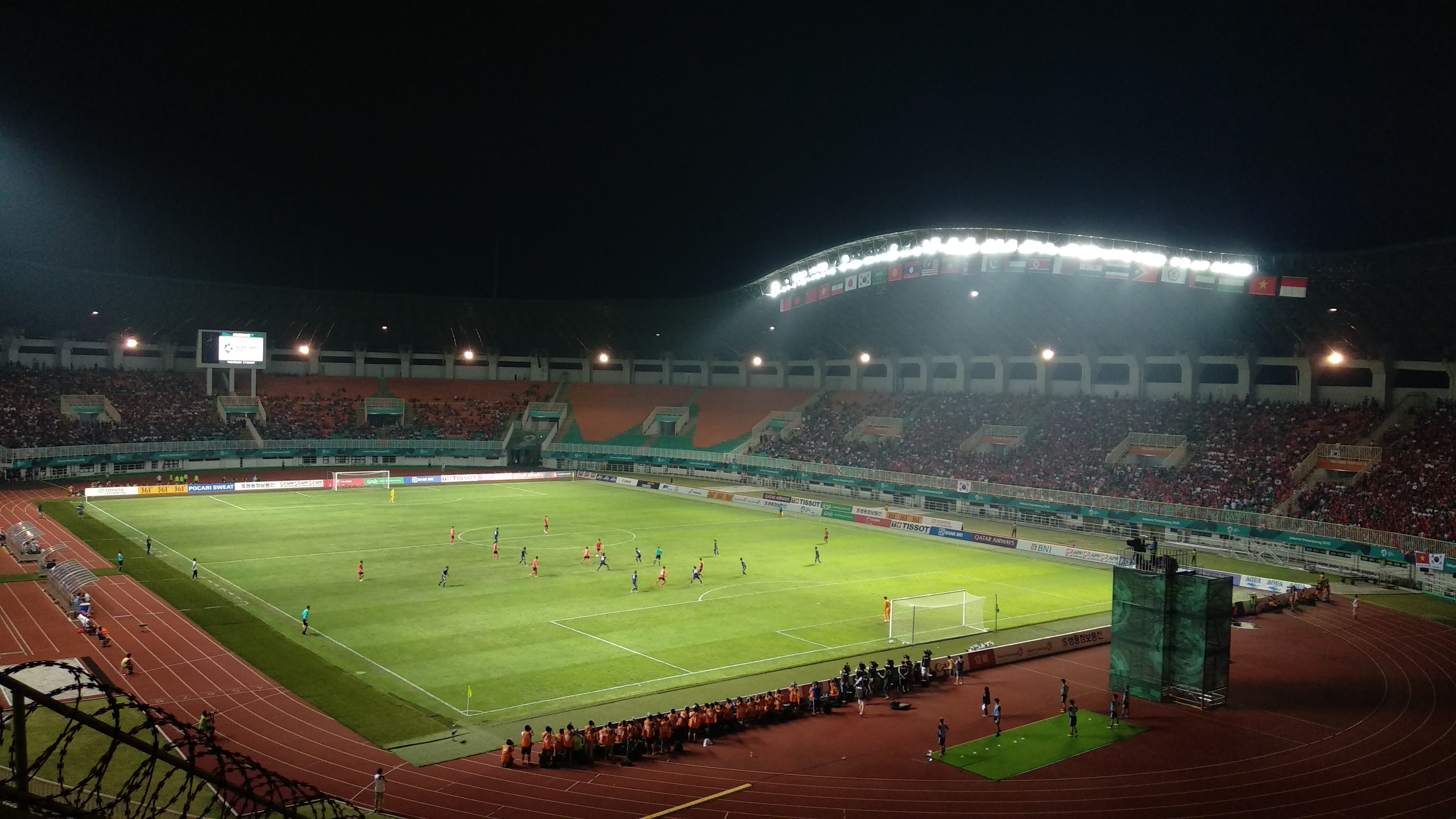
The stadium during the gold medal match between South Korea and Japan at the men's football tournament of 2018 Asian Games

== See also ==
- Patriot Candrabhaga Stadium
- Wibawa Mukti Stadium
- Si Jalak Harupat Stadium
- Gelora Bandung Lautan Api Stadium
- List of stadiums in Indonesia

Events and tenants
| Preceded by Incheon Munhak Stadium; Incheon | Asian Games Football tournament Final Venue; 2018 | Succeeded by Huanglong Sports Center; Hangzhou |
