= Arsyad Yusgiantoro =

Indonesian footballer

Personal information
- Full name: Arsyad Yusgiantoro
- Date of birth: 11 July 1996 (age 30)
- Place of birth: Tulungagung, Indonesia
- Height: 5 ft 8 in (1.72 m)
- Position: Winger

Team information
- Current team: Persekat Tegal
- Number: 39

Youth career
- 2012–2014: Pro Duta

Senior career*
Years	Team	Apps	(Gls)
2014–2015	Pro Duta	7	(0)
2016–2017	Persegres Gresik United	36	(5)
2018	PSM Makassar	3	(0)
2019–2022	PSS Sleman	32	(0)
2022–2023	Persik Kediri	14	(1)
2023–2024	Semen Padang	19	(1)
2024–2025	Persela Lamongan	8	(1)
2025	Persiku Kudus	4	(0)
2026–	Persekat Tegal	12	(1)
- * Club domestic league appearances and goals as of 8 May 2026

Arsyad Yusgiantoro (born 11 July 1996, in Tulungagung) is an Indonesian professional footballer who plays as a winger for Liga 2 club Persekat Tegal.

== Club career ==
In 2016, Arsyad join Persegres Gresik United for the 2016 Indonesia Soccer Championship A. Arsyad scored for the first time when Persegres went up against Semen Padang FC. He scored a goal in the 49th minutes.

== International career ==
He was called up for the Indonesia national team on 21 March 2017 for a friendly match against Myanmar.

== Career statistics ==
=== Club ===
As of match played 8 May 2026

Club	Season	League			Cup (Note: Includes Piala Indonesia)		Continental		Other		Total	
Club	Season	Division	Apps	Goals	Apps	Goals	Apps	Goals	Apps	Goals	Apps	Goals
Pro Duta	2014	Premier Division	7	0	0	0	0	0	0	0	7	0
Pro Duta	2015	Premier Division	7	0	0	0	0	0	0	0	7	0
Pro Duta	Total		7	0	0	0	0	0	0	0	7	0
Persegres Gresik	2016	ISC A	11	1	0	0	0	0	0	0	11	1
Persegres Gresik	2017	Liga 1	25	4	0	0	0	0	0	0	25	4
Persegres Gresik	Total		36	5	0	0	0	0	0	0	36	5
PSM Makassar	2018	Liga 1	3	0	0	0	0	0	0	0	3	0
PSS Sleman	2019	Liga 1	11	0	1	0	0	0	1 (Note: Appearances in Indonesia President's Cup)	0	13	0
PSS Sleman	2020	Liga 1	0	0	0	0	0	0	0	0	0	0
PSS Sleman	2021–22	Liga 1	21	0	0	0	0	0	7 (Note: Appearances in Menpora Cup)	0	28	0
PSS Sleman	Total		32	0	1	0	0	0	8	0	41	0
Persik Kediri	2022–23	Liga 1	14	1	0	0	–		0	0	14	1
Semen Padang	2023–24	Liga 2	19	1	0	0	–		0	0	19	1
Persela Lamongan	2024–25	Liga 2	8	1	0	0	–		0	0	8	1
Persiku Kudus	2025–26	Liga 2	4	0	0	0	–		0	0	4	0
Persekat Tegal	2025–26	Liga 2	12	1	0	0	–		0	0	12	1
Career total			135	9	1	0	0	0	8	0	144	9

== Honours ==
=== Club ===
PSS Sleman

- Menpora Cup third place: 2021

Semen Padang

- Liga 2 runner-up: 2023–24
