= Delvin Rumbino =

Indonesian association football player

Personal information
- Full name: Delvin Rumbino
- Date of birth: 3 June 1995 (age 31)
- Place of birth: Biak, Indonesia
- Height: 1.75 m (5 ft 9 in)
- Position: Midfielder

Team information
- Current team: Adhyaksa Bekasi
- Number: 99

Youth career
- –2014: PSBS Biak

Senior career*
Years	Team	Apps	(Gls)
2015	PSBS Biak	0	(0)
2016–2019	Perseru Serui	23	(1)
2019–2020	Persela Lamongan	31	(2)
2020	Barito Putera	1	(0)
2021–2022	Persis Solo	7	(0)
2022	→ PSM Makassar (loan)	14	(1)
2022–2026	PSIS Semarang	65	(0)
2026–	Adhyaksa Bekasi	2	(0)
- * Club domestic league appearances and goals as of 18 September 2026

Delvin Rumbino (born 3 June 1995) is an Indonesian professional footballer who plays as a midfielder for Championship club Adhyaksa Bekasi.

== Career ==
=== Perseru Serui ===
In 2018, Rumbino joined Liga 1 club Perseru Serui. He made his debut on 25 March 2018 in a match against Persebaya Surabaya. On 31 July 2018, Rumbino scored his first goal for Perseru in the 93rd minute against Persebaya Surabaya.

=== Persela Lamongan ===
In 2019, Rumbino joined Liga 1 club Persela Lamongan. He made his debut on 17 May 2019 in a match against Madura United. On 15 November 2019, Rumbino scored his first goal for Persela in the 43rd minute against Persija Jakarta.

=== PS Barito Putera ===
He was signed for Barito Putera to play in Liga 1 in the 2020 season. This season was suspended on 27 March 2020 due to the COVID-19 pandemic. The season was abandoned and was declared void on 20 January 2021.

=== Persis Solo ===
In 2021, Rumbino signed a contract with Indonesian Liga 2 club Persis Solo. He made first 2021–22 Liga 2 debut on 26 September 2021, coming on as a starter in a 2–0 win against Bekasi City at the Manahan Stadium, Surakarta.

==== PSM Makassar (loan) ====
In 2022, Rumbino signed a contract with Indonesian Liga 1 club PSM Makassar, on loan from Persis Solo. He made his league debut on 8 January 2022 in a match against Madura United at the Ngurah Rai Stadium, Denpasar.

=== PSIS Semarang ===
Rumbino officially joined PSIS Semarang for the 2022–23 Liga 1 competition. He made first 2022–23 Liga 1 debut on 23 July 2022 in a match against RANS Nusantara at the Jatidiri Stadium, Semarang.

== Honours ==
Persis Solo

- Liga 2: 2021
