= Tamsil Sijaya =

Indonesian footballer

Personal information
- Full name: Tamsil Sijaya
- Date of birth: 22 February 1987 (age 39)
- Place of birth: Gowa, Indonesia
- Height: 1.70 m (5 ft 7 in)
- Position: Midfielder

Senior career*
Years	Team	Apps	(Gls)
2013–2014	Persibo Bojonegoro	16	(2)
2014	Persik Kediri	12	(1)
2015–2016	PSM Makassar	2	(0)
2016	Persela Lamongan	10	(0)
2017–2019	Persita Tangerang	18	(0)
2019	Persibat Batang	6	(0)
2020–2021	Kalteng Putra	9	(2)
2022–2023	Persijap Jepara	2	(0)
- * Club domestic league appearances and goals as of 22:53, 12 September 2014 (UTC)

Tamsil Sijaya (born 22 February 1987) is an Indonesian former footballer who plays as a midfielder.
