= Firly Apriansyah =

Indonesian association footballer

Personal information
- Full name: Firly Apriansyah
- Date of birth: 27 April 1986 (age 40)
- Place of birth: Jakarta, Indonesia
- Height: 6 ft 0 in (1.82 m)
- Position: Centre-back

Senior career*
Years	Team	Apps	(Gls)
2007–2009	Pelita Jaya	26	(0)
2009–2012	Persiwa Wamena	61	(2)
2012–2014	Madura United	36	(0)
2014–2015	Bhayangkara	2	(0)
2016–2017	Borneo	30	(1)
2017	→ Bhayangkara (loan)	6	(0)
2018	Barito Putera	2	(0)
2019–2021	Mitra Kukar	13	(2)
2022–2023	Serpong City	2	(1)
Total		178	(6)
- * Club domestic league appearances and goals

Firly Apriansyah (born 27 April 1986 in Jakarta, Indonesia) is an Indonesian former footballer who plays as a centre-back.

== Honours ==
Borneo

- Indonesia President's Cup runner-up: 2017

Bhayangkara

- Liga 1: 2017

Serpong City

- Liga 3: 2022
