= Dirkir Glay =

Liberian professional footballer (born 1992)

Personal information
- Full name: Dirkir Kohn Glay
- Date of birth: 1 January 1992 (age 34)
- Place of birth: Monrovia, Liberia
- Height: 1.83 m (6 ft 0 in)
- Position: Defender

Senior career*
Years	Team	Apps	(Gls)
2010–2011	Watanga FC		
2011–2014	Thika United	41	(3)
2014–2015	KF Tirana	3	(0)
2014	→ KF Elbasani (loan)	7	(0)
2015–2016	Gor Mahia		
2016–2017	Persiba Balikpapan	40	(6)
2019–	LISCR FC	24	(2)

International career^{‡}
2015–	Liberia	9	(0)
- * Club domestic league appearances and goals as of 29 May 2017 ‡ National team caps and goals as of 18 November 2015

Dirkir Kohn Glay (born 1 January 1992) is a Liberian professional footballer who plays as a defender for Liberian First Division club LISCR FC.
