= Boman Aimé =

Ivorian footballer

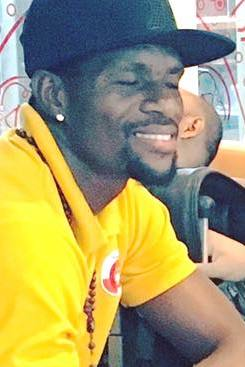
- Aimé with Perseru Serui in 2017

Personal information
- Full name: Boman Bi Irie Aimé
- Date of birth: August 16, 1989 (age 37)
- Place of birth: Dabou, Ivory Coast
- Height: 1.89 m (6 ft 2 in)
- Position: Defender

Team information
- Current team: Dejan
- Number: 6

Senior career*
| Years | Team | Apps | (Gls) |
| 2009–2014 | Société de l'Armée | 78 | (7) |
| 2014–2016 | PSM Makassar | 34 | (1) |
| 2016–2018 | Perseru Serui | 38 | (1) |
| 2024– | Dejan | 6 | (1) |
- * Club domestic league appearances and goals as of 19 October 2024

Boman Bi Irie Aimé (born 16 August 1989) is an Ivorian professional footballer who plays as defender for Liga 2 club Dejan.

== Career ==
He has played professional for Côte d'Ivoire Premier Division club side Société Omnisports de l'Armée. and He played in Indonesia Super League for PSM Makassar. and Perseru Serui. And now, he played in Liga 2 Indonesia for Dejan.
