= Piala Presiden (Indonesia) =

Pre-season association football tournament

- Organiser(s): PSSI
- Founded: 2015; 11 years ago
- Region: Indonesia
- Teams: 16 (2015); 20 (2017–2019); 18 (2022); 8 (2024, 2026); 6 (2025)
- Current champions: (Indonesia) Persebaya (1st title)
- Most championships: (Indonesia) Arema (4 titles)
- Broadcasters: Indosiar; Vidio
- Website: Official website
- 2026 Piala Presiden

Piala Presiden (lit. 'President's Cup') is an annual pre-season association football competition held in Indonesia and organized by the Football Association of Indonesia (PSSI) originally as a stand-in tournament after the FIFA sanctions in 2015.

== History ==
The Piala Presiden was created as a substitute for the Indonesia Super League after the Football Association of Indonesia was sanctioned by FIFA in May 2015 for government interference and major political involvements within the country's football administration. The competition was initiated by Mahaka Sports and Entertainment to maintain football activity in the country. The first match was played on 30 August 2015 at Kapten I Wayan Dipta Stadium, where Bali United beat Persija 3–0. The tournament concluded on 18 October 2015 at Gelora Bung Karno Stadium, with Persib defeating Sriwijaya FC 2–0 in the final.

After the 2015 tournament, plans for the tournament resurfaced in mid-2016. However, those plans were shelved after Gelora Trisula Semesta initiated a one-season tournament called the Indonesia Soccer Championship.

In 2017, the Football Association of Indonesia resumed the Piala Presiden after being cleared of sanctions by FIFA the previous year. The tournament began on 4 February 2017, and was joined by 20 clubs. Mahaka Sports and Entertainment was no longer involved in its organization.

In 2018, PSSI rescheduled the 2018 Piala Presiden. This tournament became a Liga 1 pre-season tournament. Persija took their first title after beating down Bali United 3–0 in the final at Gelora Bung Karno Stadium in Jakarta.

In 2019, the final was played in a home and away ties format and there was no third place match. Arema successfully clinched their second title after beating Persebaya 4–2 on aggregate in the finals at Persebaya's Gelora Bung Tomo Stadium and Arema's Kanjuruhan Stadium.

The tournament returned for the 2022 edition after three years after a long hiatus due to the COVID-19 pandemic. The final was held with two-legged matches and was contested by Arema and Borneo Samarinda, in a repeat of the 2017 final. The defending champions, Arema grabbed their third title after beating Borneo Samarinda 1–0 on aggregate in the finals at both Arema's Kanjuruhan Stadium and Borneo Samarinda's Segiri Stadium.

After 2 years, the cup returned for the 2024 edition. The final returned to a one match format and was contested by Arema and Borneo Samarinda, which is their second meet-up since the previous edition. The two-time reigning champions, Arema grabbed their fourth title after beating Borneo Samarinda 5–4 on penalties following a 1–1 draw in the final at the Manahan Stadium in Surakarta.

The 2025 edition was the first in the tournament's history to feature foreign teams. PSSI and the President's Cup committee officially invited Oxford United FC from England and Port FC from Thailand to participate. The move was intended to improve Indonesian football's quality and give local clubs international experience. Port eventually took their first title after beating Oxford United 2–1 in the final at Si Jalak Harupat Stadium.

In 2026, the tournament had two editions, the Piala Presiden Elite which included the normal selections of teams as of the majority of the past seasons and Liga 4 Piala Presiden which was title for the Liga 4 national phase and did not count for the main Piala Presiden title. The three Southeast Asian teams that were invited are Port, Tampines Rovers and DPMM. Reigning Super League champions Persib lose the final to Persebaya Surabaya after a 1–1 tie in extra time and to be finished off by penalties 6–5. In August 2026, PSSI announced that starting in 2027, Piala Presiden would invite predominantly national teams to play against Indonesia in a similar manner to the King's Cup in Thailand.

== Opening matches ==
- 2015: Kapten I Wayan Dipta Stadium, Gianyar Regency
- 2017: Maguwoharjo Stadium, Sleman Regency
- 2018: Gelora Bandung Lautan Api Stadium, Bandung
- 2019: Si Jalak Harupat Stadium, Bandung Regency
- 2022: Manahan Stadium, Surakarta
- 2024: Si Jalak Harupat Stadium, Bandung Regency
- 2025: Gelora Bung Karno Stadium, Jakarta
- 2026: Si Jalak Harupat Stadium, Bandung Regency

== Finals ==
=== One-legged ===
| Season | City/Regency | Winner | Score | Runner-Up | Venue |
|---|---|---|---|---|---|
| 2015 | Jakarta | Persib Bandung | 2–0 | Sriwijaya | Gelora Bung Karno Stadium |
| 2017 | Bogor | Arema | 5–1 | Pusamania Borneo | Pakansari Stadium |
| 2018 | Jakarta | Persija Jakarta | 3–0 | Bali United | Gelora Bung Karno Stadium |
| 2024 | Surakarta | Arema | 1–1 (5–4 p) | Borneo Samarinda | Manahan Stadium |
| 2025 | Bandung | Port | 2–1 | Oxford United | Si Jalak Harupat Stadium |
| 2026 | Gianyar | Persebaya Surabaya | 1–1 (6–5 p) | Persib Bandung | Kapten I Wayan Dipta Stadium |

=== Two-legged ===
| Season | City/Regency | Home | Score | Away | Venue |
|---|---|---|---|---|---|
| 2019 | Surabaya | Persebaya Surabaya | 2–2 | Arema | Gelora Bung Karno Stadium |
| 2019 | Malang | Arema | 2–0 | Persebaya Surabaya | Kanjuruhan Stadium |
| 2019 | Arema won 4–2 on aggregate | | | | |
| 2022 | Malang | Arema | 1–0 | Borneo Samarinda | Kanjuruhan Stadium |
| 2022 | Samarinda | Borneo Samarinda | 0–0 | Arema | Segiri Stadium |
| 2022 | Arema won 1–0 on aggregate | | | | |

== Third place matches ==
| Season | City/Regency | Third place | Score | Fourth place | Venue |
|---|---|---|---|---|---|
| 2015 | Gianyar | Arema Cronus | 2–0 | Mitra Kukar | Kapten I Wayan Dipta Stadium |
| 2017 | Bogor | Persib Bandung | 1–0 | Semen Padang | Pakansari Stadium |
| 2018 | Jakarta | Sriwijaya | 4–0 | PSMS Medan | Gelora Bung Karno Stadium |
| 2024 | Surakarta | Persis Solo | 1–0 | Persija Jakarta | Manahan Stadium |
| 2025 | Bandung | Dewa United | 2–0 | Liga Indonesia All-Stars | Si Jalak Harupat Stadium |
| 2026 | Gianyar | Persija Jakarta | 3–1 | Arema | Kapten I Wayan Dipta Stadium |

== Competition record ==
Note: Does not count titles won by Liga 4 or grassroots team.

| * | Current Holder |
| ‡ | Record Champions |

| Club | Titles | Runner-Up | Years Won |
|---|---|---|---|
| Arema‡ | 4 | — | 2017, 2019, 2022, 2024 |
| Persib Bandung | 1 | 1 | 2015 |
| Persebaya Surabaya* | 1 | 1 | 2026 |
| Persija Jakarta | 1 | — | 2018 |
| Port | 1 | — | 2025 |
| Borneo Samarinda | — | 3 | — |
| Sriwijaya | — | 1 | — |
| Bali United | — | 1 | — |
| Oxford United | — | 1 | — |

== Awards ==
=== Top Scorers ===
| Season | Player | Club | Goals |
|---|---|---|---|
| 2015 | (Indonesia) Zulham Zamrun | Persib Bandung | 6 |
| 2017 | (Indonesia) Cristian Gonzáles | Arema | 11 |
| 2018 | (Croatia) Marko Šimić | Persija Jakarta | 11 |
| 2019 | (Brazil) Bruno Matos | Persija Jakarta | 5 |
| 2019 | (Indonesia) Ricky Kayame | Arema | 5 |
| 2019 | (Tajikistan) Manuchekhr Dzhalilov | Persebaya Surabaya | 5 |
| 2022 | (Brazil) Matheus Pato | Borneo Samarinda | 6 |
| 2024 | (Indonesia) Ramadhan Sananta | Persis Solo | 3 |
| 2025 | (Wales) Mark Harris | Oxford United | 3 |
| 2026 | (Brazil) Gustavo Henrique | Arema | 4 |

=== Best Players ===
| Season | Player | Club |
|---|---|---|
| 2015 | (Indonesia) Zulham Zamrun | Persib Bandung |
| 2017 | (Indonesia) Adam Alis | Arema |
| 2018 | (Croatia) Marko Šimić | Persija Jakarta |
| 2019 | (Indonesia) Hamka Hamzah | Arema |
| 2022 | (Brazil) Adilson Maringá | Arema |
| 2024 | (Australia) Charles Lokolingoy | Arema |
| 2025 | (Thailand) Bordin Phala | Port |
| 2026 | (Mexico) Francisco Rivera | Persebaya Surabaya |

=== Best Young Players ===
| Season | Player | Club |
|---|---|---|
| 2017 | (Indonesia) Febri Hariyadi | Persib Bandung |
| 2018 | (Indonesia) Rezaldi Hehanussa | Persija Jakarta |
| 2019 | (Indonesia) Irfan Jaya | Persebaya Surabaya |
| 2022 | (Indonesia) Fajar Fathur Rahman | Borneo Samarinda |
| 2024 | (Indonesia) Arkhan Fikri | Arema |
| 2025 | (England) Leo Snowden | Oxford United |
| 2026 | (Indonesia) Arlyansyah Abdulmanan | Persija Jakarta |

== Broadcasters ==
| Year | Broadcasters | Description | Ref. |
|---|---|---|---|
| 2015–present | Emtek | Live on Indosiar (2015–present), SCTV (2017), or O Channel (2018).; Live streaming on Vidio.; Available for Nex Parabola customers. | |
| 2025 | Sin Po Media | Live on Sin Po TV. | |

== See also ==
- Super League
- Championship
- Piala Indonesia
- I-League Cup
