= Jorge Gotor =

Spanish footballer

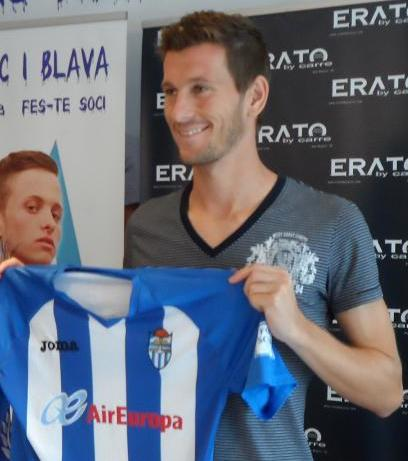

Personal information
- Full name: Jorge Gotor Blas
- Date of birth: 14 April 1987 (age 39)
- Place of birth: Zaragoza, Spain
- Height: 1.87 m (6 ft 2 in)
- Position: Centre back

Team information
- Current team: San Juan Mozarrifar

Youth career
- 2002–2005: Zaragoza

Senior career*
Years	Team	Apps	(Gls)
2005–2008	Zaragoza B	45	(3)
2008–2009	Espanyol B	24	(1)
2009–2010	Murcia B	25	(1)
2010–2011	Murcia	17	(1)
2011–2012	Getafe B	32	(3)
2012	Atlético Baleares	9	(1)
2013	Guijuelo	9	(0)
2013–2014	Sariñena	10	(1)
2014	Erbil	?	(1)
2015–2017	Eldense	41	(2)
2017	Mitra Kukar	24	(2)
2018	New Radiant		
2018–2019	Bashundhara Kings	7	(0)
2019–	San Juan Mozarrifar	26	(3)

International career
2004	Spain U17	5	(0)
- * Club domestic league appearances and goals as of 8 March 2020

Jorge Gotor Blas (born 14 April 1987) is a Spanish professional footballer who plays for AD San Juan de Mozarrifar as a central defender.

== Club career ==
Born in Zaragoza, Aragon, Gotor graduated from the youth academy of local Real Zaragoza and made his senior debut with their reserves in the 2005–06 season, in Segunda División B. He went on to represent fellow league teams RCD Espanyol B, Real Murcia Imperial, Real Murcia, Getafe CF B, CD Atlético Baleares and CD Guijuelo.

In the summer of 2014, Gotor moved abroad for the first time in his career and signed for Iraqi club Erbil SC alongside compatriot Borja Rubiato. Although he had a contract running until 25 January 2015, he left the country and returned to Spain in August following the bombings of the city.

On 7 August 2015, Gotor returned to the Spanish third level by joining CD Eldense. On 18 January 2017, he moved to Mitra Kukar F.C. of Liga 1 (Indonesia) as a replacement for the departing Arthur Cunha.

After a stint in the Maldives with New Radiant SC, 31-year-old Gotor signed with Bangladeshi team Bashundhara Kings on 1 October 2018.

== International career ==
Gotor was capped by Spain at under-17 level.
