= Si Jalak Harupat Stadium =

Stadium in Bandung, West Java, Indonesia

Stadion Si Jalak Harupat
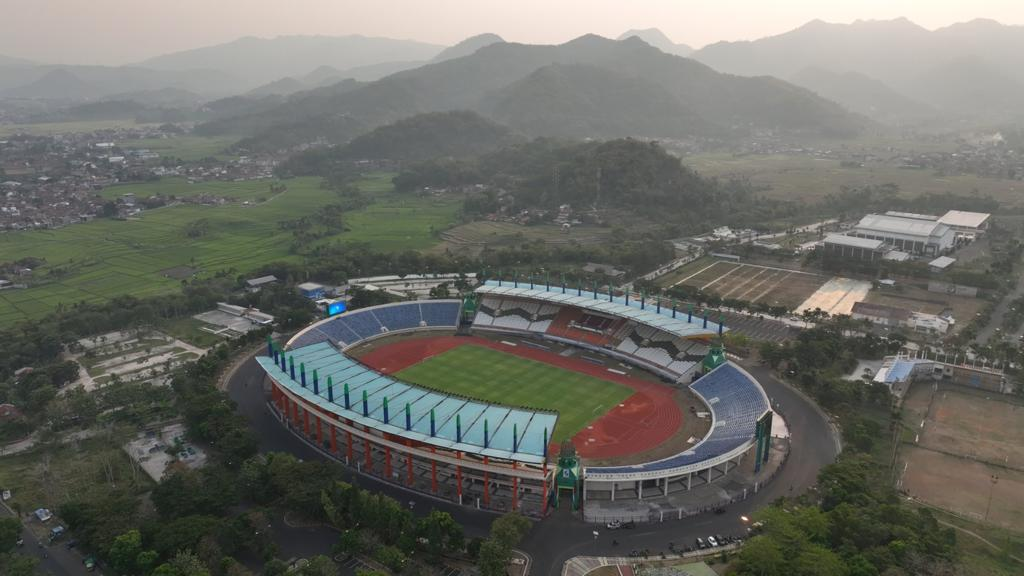
- Interactive map of Stadion Si Jalak Harupat
- Location: Soreang, Bandung Regency, West Java, Indonesia
- Coordinates: 6°59′47″S 107°31′47″E
- Owner: Government of Bandung Regency
- Capacity: 27,000
- Surface: Manila grass

Construction
- Opened: 26 April 2005
- Renovated: 2009, 2020–2023

Tenants
- Persikab Bandung (2005–present); Persib Bandung (2009–2016); Pelita Bandung Raya (2012–2015); PSKC Cimahi (2022–2025)

Si Jalak Harupat Stadium is a multi-purpose stadium located in Kutawaringin Subdistrict, Bandung Regency, West Java, Indonesia. It is currently used for association football matches and was used for the 2018 Asian Games men's football tournament.

The stadium was the home ground of the Liga 1 football club, Persib Bandung from 2009 to 2016. The stadium holds 27,000 people.

== Sporting events (football) ==
- 2008 AFF Championship Group A match between Myanmar vs Cambodia
- 2013 Piala Menpora
- 2015 AFC Cup match in the group stage and Round of 16 at home to Persib Bandung
- 2018 Asian Games men's football tournament
- An international friendly between Indonesia and Bangladesh in 2022
- 2023 FIFA U-17 World Cup
- 2026 FIFA ASEAN Cup
- 2026–27 AFC Champions League Two Play-off Qualifiers and Group Stage Match

== Gallery ==
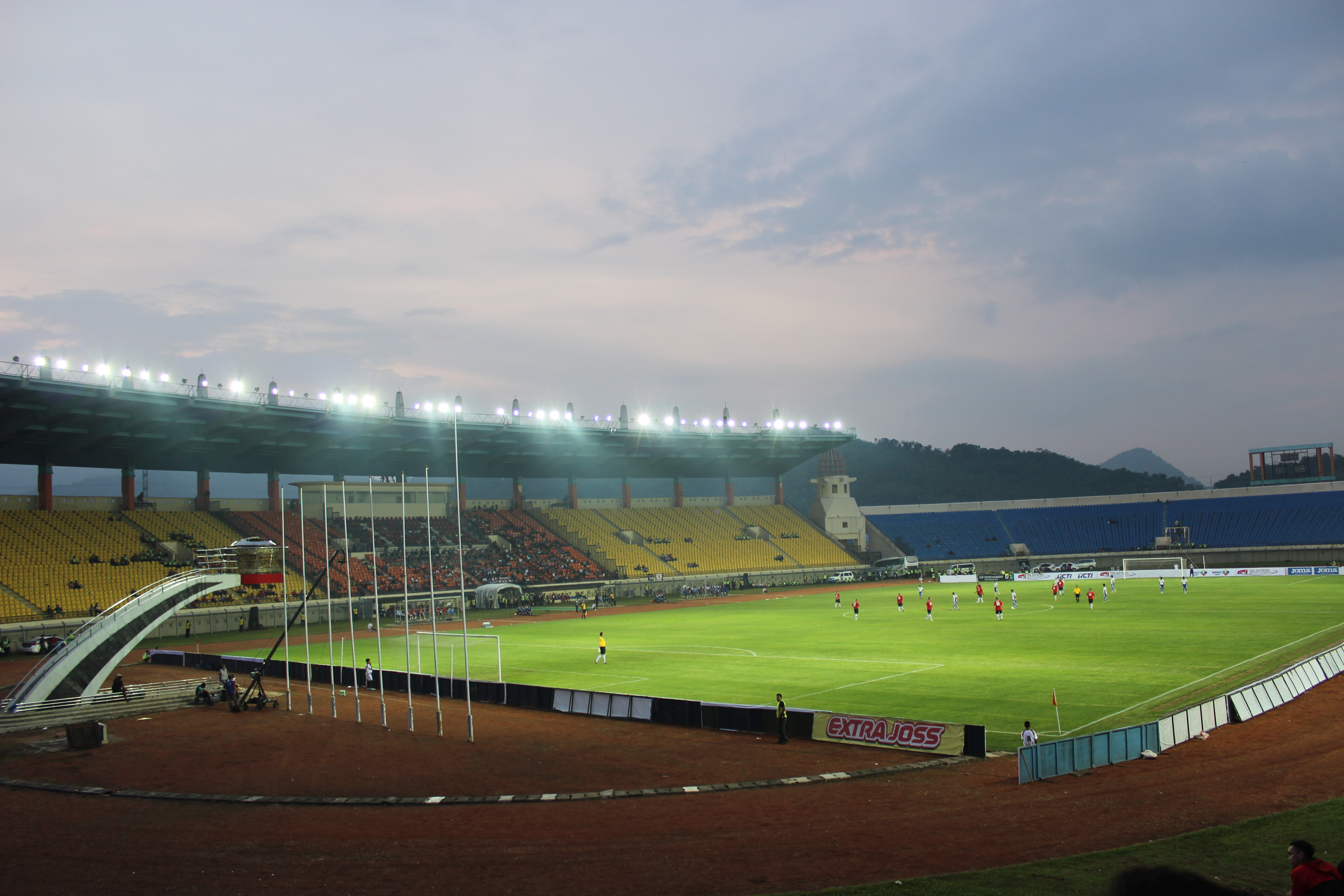
The stadium on a matchday in 2014

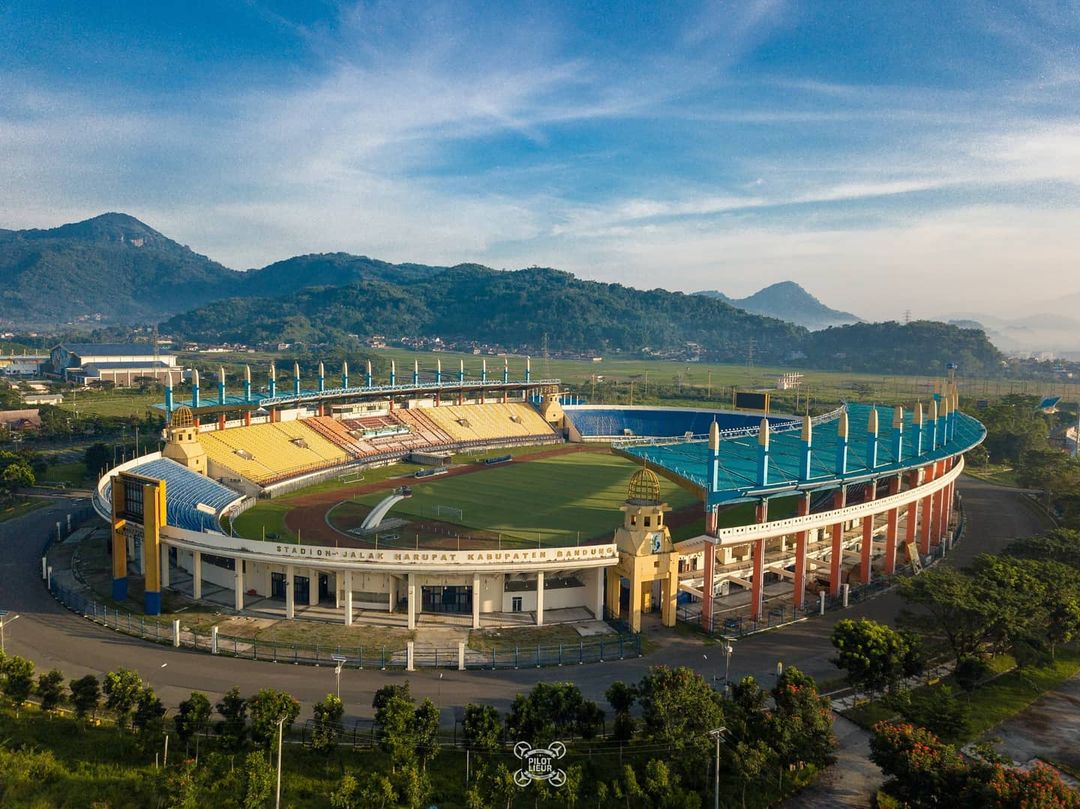
The stadium before the renovation

== See also ==
- List of stadiums in Indonesia
- List of stadiums by capacity

== See also ==
- List of stadiums in Indonesia
