= 2023–24 Liga 2 (Indonesia) =

Liga 2
- Season: 2023–24
- Dates: 10 September 2023 – 9 March 2024
- Champions: PSBS (1st title)
- Promoted: PSBS; Semen Padang; Malut United
- Relegated: Kalteng Putra; Perserang; Persiba; Persikab; PSDS; PSCS; Sada Sumut; Sulut United
- Matches: 252
- Goals: 609 (2.42 per match)
- Top goalscorer: Alexsandro (19 goals)
- Biggest home win: Nusantara United 7–3 PSDS (6 January 2024)
- Biggest away win: Persiba 2–6 PSBS (23 November 2023)
- Highest scoring: Nusantara United 7–3 PSDS (6 January 2024)
- Longest winning run: Persewar (5 matches)
- Longest unbeaten run: Persiraja (11 matches)
- Longest winless run: Persiraja (4 matches)
- Longest losing run: PSDS (7 matches)
- Highest attendance: 31,000; Persiraja 0–0 PSMS (18 November 2023)
- Lowest attendance: 70; PSCS 3–0 Kalteng Putra (27 January 2024) (excluding matches played behind closed door)
- Total attendance: 608,062
- Average attendance: 3,577

The 2023–24 Liga 2 (Indonesia) (also known as the 2023–24 Pegadaian Liga 2 for sponsorship reasons) was the seventh season of the Liga 2 under its current name and the 14th season under its current league structure. PT Liga Indonesia Baru (LIB) are responsible for administrating the league. Plans to change Liga 2's operator were shelved for this season and will be postponed to at least the 2024–2025 season.

As Liga 2's previous season and 2022–23 Liga 3 were abandoned due to a combination of factors with the most notable among them being the Kanjuruhan Stadium disaster, participants of the league remain unchanged from last season, 28 teams (an increase of four teams from the 2021–22 Liga 2 season). The new season also marked the return of foreign players to the second division of Indonesian football.

The league format was announced on 16 August 2023. The season started on 10 September 2023.

== Teams ==
=== Team changes ===
As the 2022–23 Liga 2 and 2022–23 Liga 3 were abandoned along with the relegation rule which was being scrapped from 2022–23 Liga 1, the league's teams remain unchanged. The following teams changed division after the 2021 season.

To Liga 2

Relegated from Liga 1

- Persipura
- Persela
- Persiraja

Promoted from Liga 3

- Sada Sumut (formerly known as Karo United)
- Malut United (formerly known as Putra Delta Sidoarjo)
- PSDS
- Nusantara United (replacing Mataram Utama)
- Deltras
- Persikab
- Persipa
- Gresik United
From Liga 2

Promoted to Liga 1

- Persis
- RANS Nusantara (formerly known as RANS Cilegon)
- Dewa United

Relegated to Liga 3

- Tiga Naga
- Badak Lampung
- Hizbul Wathan
- Mitra Kukar

=== Name changes ===
- AHHA PS Pati relocated to Bekasi and were renamed to Bekasi Football Club. However, following a lawsuit by Bekasi FC's original rights holder, the club is subject to another name change. On 30 May 2022, during the 2022 PSSI Ordinary Congress, the club finally changed their name once again to Bekasi City.
- Mataram Utama handed over their senior team to a group of investors, who subsequently rebranded the club as Nusantara United. The two clubs exist as separate entities, with Nusantara United taking over Mataram Utama's place in the Liga 2, while Mataram Utama redirected their focus towards youth development and their football academy. On 5 July 2022, Nusantara United, on an Instagram post unveiling their new logo, revealed that they are now based in Nusantara, the planned new capital of Indonesia.
- Muba Babel United were acquired by Liga 3 side Persipal Palu. As a result, Persipal took over Muba Babel United's place in Liga 2 starting from the 2022–23 season and they will compete under name Persipal BU.
- The license for Putra Delta Siduarjo were bought by owners of PT Mineral Trobos, David Glenn and Kenneth Jehezkiel, through PT Malut Maju Sejahtera and were renamed to Malut United. Malut stands for Maluku Utara, the home province of the club, as the club's new owners moved its base to Ternate, North Maluku.
- Karo United changed its name to Sada Sumut. The word 'Sada' means 'one' in Batak Karo language and the word 'Sumut' is an acronym for the name of the province of Sumatra Utara or North Sumatra hence the name change was intended by the club in order to represent all of North Sumatra.

=== Stadiums and locations ===
Locations of non-Java-based 2023–24 Liga 2 teams.
Red: Group 1; Yellow: Group 2; Green: Group 3; Blue: Group 4
Locations of Java-based 2023–24 Liga 2 teams

Team	Location	Stadium	Capacity
Bekasi City	Bekasi	Patriot Candrabhaga Stadium (Note: FC Bekasi City also registered the Singaperbangsa Stadium in Karawang as their home stadium as the Patriot Candrabhaga is also being used by both Persija Jakarta and Bhayangkara for their Liga 1 matches this season.)	30,000
Deltras	Sidoarjo	Gelora Delta Stadium	35,000
Gresik United	Gresik	Gelora Joko Samudro Stadium	40,000
Kalteng Putra	Palangka Raya	Tuah Pahoe Stadium	10,000
Malut United	Ternate	Gelora Kie Raha Stadium	15,000
Nusantara United	Nusantara	Kebo Giro Stadium, at Boyolali (Note: As the city of Nusantara is still under construction until at least 2024, Nusantara United will temporarily base themselves at the city of Salatiga, however they will play league games at the Kebo Giro Stadium in nearby Boyolali.)	12,000
Persekat	Tegal	Mochtar Stadium, at Pemalang (Note: Persekat can not use their home ground, Tri Sanja Stadium in Tegal due to improvement and renovation work for an estimated 6 months.)	15,000
Persela	Lamongan	Surajaya Stadium	16,000
Perserang	Serang	Maulana Yusuf Stadium	15,000
Persewar	Waropen	Mandala Stadium, at Jayapura	30,000
Persiba	Balikpapan	Batakan Stadium	40,000
Persijap	Jepara	Gelora Bumi Kartini Stadium	20,000
Persikab	Bandung	Gelora Bandung Lautan Api Stadium	38,000
Persipa	Pati	Joyokusumo Stadium	10,000
Persipal BU	Palu	Gawalise Stadium	20,000
Persipura	Jayapura	Mandala Stadium	30,000
Persiraja	Banda Aceh	Harapan Bangsa Stadium	45,000
PSBS	Biak Numfor	Cendrawasih Stadium	15,000
PSCS	Cilacap	Wijayakusuma Stadium	10,000
PSDS	Deli Serdang	Baharuddin Siregar Stadium	15,000
PSIM	Yogyakarta	Mandala Krida Stadium (Note: PSIM also registered the Sultan Agung Stadium in Bantul as the Mandala Krida doesn't have the required lighting for matches played at night.)	35,000
PSKC	Cimahi	Siliwangi Stadium, at Bandung (Note: As their home ground at the Sangkuriang Stadium in Cimahi is still under extensive renovation, PSKC will be playing out of Bandung for the 2023–24 season, with the club also registering the Gelora Bandung Lautan Api Stadium as their home stadium. Moreover, due to the unavailability of both the Siliwangi and the GBLA, PSKC played their first home match of the season at the Maguwoharjo Stadium in Sleman.)	25,000
PSMS	Medan	Teladan Stadium	20,000
PSPS	Pekanbaru	Kaharudin Nasution Stadium	30,000
Sada Sumut	Karo	Baharuddin Siregar Stadium, at Deli Serdang	20,000
Semen Padang	Padang	Gelora Haji Agus Salim Stadium	20,000
Sriwijaya	Palembang	Gelora Sriwijaya Stadium	23,000
Sulut United	Manado	Klabat Stadium	10,000

=== Personnel and kits ===
Note: Flags indicate national team as has been defined under FIFA eligibility rules. Players and coaches may hold more than one non-FIFA nationality.

Team	Head coach	Captain	Kit manufacturer	Shirt sponsor(s)
Bekasi City	(Indonesia) Widyantoro	(Indonesia) Soni Setiawan	(Indonesia) Ad hoc	PStore^{1}, AHHA^{1}
Deltras	(Indonesia) Widodo Cahyono Putro	(Indonesia) Rendi Irwan	(Indonesia) Lekaw	Kapal Api^{1}, RANS Entertainment^{1}, Sarung Al Hijaz^{1}, Rojo Sambel Si Aa^{1}
Gresik United	(Indonesia) Agus Indra Kurniawan	(Indonesia) Jefri Kurniawan	(Indonesia) GUS Apparel^{5}	ISO Plus^{1}, Wilmar^{1}, Hyundai Gowa^{1}, Phonska Plus^{1}, Monura Land^{1}, Royyan Interior Architecture^{1}, Sarung Wadimor^{2}, Rumah Makan Bandeng Pak Elan 2^{2}, TipTip^{2}
Kalteng Putra	(Indonesia) Eko Tamamie (caretaker)	(Indonesia) Sandi Sute	(Indonesia) Ereight	Bank Kalteng^{1}, Halo Dayak^{1}, Agustiar Sabran Foundation^{2}, Kalteng Pos^{2}
Malut United	(Indonesia) Imran Nahumarury	(Indonesia) Ilham Armaiyn	(Indonesia) Tweve	Mineral Trobos^{1}, PT. Gebe Sinar Perkasa^{1}, PT. Gebe Prima Mandiri^{2}, Lumbung Ikan Maluku^{3}
Nusantara United	(Indonesia) Salahudin	(Indonesia) Risna Prahalabenta	(Indonesia) Mills	Adaro^{1}, Indosat^{1}, Alderon^{1}, Nasmoco^{1}, Oasis Waters^{1}, Hanamasa^{1}, Trima^{1}, Royal Sports Medicine Centre^{3}
Persekat	(Indonesia) Mial Balebata Armand	(Indonesia) Fiwi Dwipan	(Indonesia) Sebayu^{5}	Ersal Aburizal^{1}, Sentosa Beton Perkasa^{1}, Tegal Road Construction^{2}, Bhamada University^{3}, C’BEZT Fried Chicken^{3}
Persela	(Indonesia) Djajang Nurdjaman	(Indonesia) Zulham Zamrun	(Indonesia) Etams	Belikopi^{1}, Lyly Bakery^{1}, Extra Joss^{2}
Perserang	(Indonesia) Bonggo Pribadi	(Indonesia) Egi Regiansyah	(Indonesia) SLEMN24	Bank Syariah Indonesia^{1}, Cuwitan 62^{1}
Persewar	(Indonesia) Eduard Ivakdalam	(Indonesia) Elvis Harewan	(Indonesia) Zestien	Bank Papua^{1}, Ndi Sowosio Ndi Korako^{2}
Persiba	(Indonesia) Rudy Eka Priyambada	(Indonesia) Muhammad Roby	(Indonesia) Equalnesia	PSF Group (1st half)^{1}, Robot & Co (2nd half)^{1}, Royal Suite Hotel^{3}
Persijap	(Indonesia) Alfiat	(Indonesia) Qischil Minny	(Indonesia) Etams	Oasis Waters^{1}^{2}, Oasis+^{1}
Persikab	(Indonesia) I Putu Gede	(Indonesia) Ikhfanul Alam	(Indonesia) Allvane	OHIMen^{2}
Persipa	(Indonesia) Nazal Mustofa	(Indonesia) Tri Handoko Putro	(Indonesia) Nine	Monster Laut International^{1}, BPR KCA^{1}, RS Keluarga Sehat^{1}, Sukun^{2}, pemudaidaman.id^{3}, SJK^{3}, SAB^{3}, Jurnalindo.com^{3}
Persipal BU	(Indonesia) Bambang Nurdiansyah	(Indonesia) Rendy Saputra	(Indonesia) CircleG	Bank Sulteng^{1}, CPM^{1}, IMIP^{2}, AR Official^{2}
Persipura	(Indonesia) Ricardo Salampessy	(Indonesia) Ian Kabes	(Indonesia) SPECS	Bank Papua^{1}, PT. Freeport Indonesia^{1}
Persiraja	(Indonesia) Achmad Zulkifli	(Indonesia) Mukhlis Nakata	(Indonesia) Trops	Dek Gam Foundation^{1}, Bank Syariah Indonesia^{1}, HIPMI Aceh^{1}, KNPI Aceh^{1}, PEMA^{1}, Mifa Bersaudara^{1}, PDAM Tirta Daroy^{2}, RSUD Meuraxa Kota Banda Aceh^{2}, Kyriad Muraya Hotel^{3}
PSBS	(Indonesia) Hendri Susilo	(Indonesia) Ruben Sanadi	(Indonesia) WWJD Sport	NusaTuna^{1}, Bank Papua^{1}, PT. Freeport Indonesia^{1}, Kopi ABC^{2}, Torang Hebat!^{3}
PSCS	(Indonesia) Charis Yulianto	(Indonesia) Arif Agung	(Indonesia) Nine	PSF Group^{1}, S2P^{2}, Crystalline^{2}
PSDS	(Indonesia) Zefrizal	(Indonesia) Ilham Wibowo	(Indonesia) Zeals	Musim Mas^{1}, PTPN 2^{1}, Bank Sumut^{1}, BSA^{1}
PSIM	(Indonesia) Kas Hartadi	(Indonesia) Hariono	(Indonesia) Seven Stars	Grab^{1}, Nex Parabola^{1}, Tolak Angin^{2}, Extra Joss^{2}
PSKC	(Indonesia) Doel Khamid	(Indonesia) Suhandi	(Indonesia) Calma	
PSMS	(Indonesia) Miftahudin Mukson	(Indonesia) Joko Susilo	(Indonesia) Northon	Bank Sumut^{1}, PDAM Tirtanadi^{1}, PStore^{1}, PT. Pembangunan Prasarana Sumatera Utara^{1}, PT. Perkebunan Sumatera Utara^{1}, UcokDurian^{2}, Zatan Mini Soccer^{2}, NZR Foundation^{2}
PSPS	(Indonesia) Ridwan Saragih	(Indonesia) Supardi Nasir	(Indonesia) Curva Sport	Pusat Grosir Metro Tanah Abang^{1}, RS Awal Bros^{1}, Crystalline^{1}, Springhill Group^{1}, Lintas Riau Prima^{3}
Sada Sumut	(Indonesia) Suharto AD	(Indonesia) Aidun Sastra Utami	(Indonesia) Bocorocco Active	PineVPN^{1}, MyPertamina^{2}, PLN^{2}, RSU Royal Prima^{3}
Semen Padang	(Indonesia) Delfi Adri	(Indonesia) Rosad Setiawan	(Indonesia) SPFC Apparel^{5}	Semen Padang^{1}^{3}, Bank Mandiri^{1}, Livin' by Mandiri^{1}, Pertamax Turbo^{1}, Suri Nusantara Jaya^{1}, Extra Joss^{1}, Taspen^{2}, Air Mineral SMS^{2}
Sriwijaya	(Indonesia) Hendri Susilo	(Indonesia) Nur Iskandar	(Indonesia) Tweve	Bara Coal^{1}, Bukit Asam^{1}, Bank Sumsel Babel^{1}, Semen Baturaja^{3}
Sulut United	(Indonesia) Jaya Hartono	(Indonesia) Mahadirga Lasut	(Indonesia) Etams	Minahasa Cahaya Lestari^{1}, Sentra Medika Hospital Minahasa Utara^{1}, Roger's Hotel Manado^{1}, Stadeo^{3}

Notes:

1. On the front of shirt.
2. On the back of shirt.
3. On the sleeves.
4. On the shorts.
5. Apparel made by club.

=== Coaching changes ===
Team	Outgoing head coach	Manner of departure	Date of vacancy	Position in the table	Replaced by	Date of appointment
Persiraja	(Indonesia) Washiyatul Akmal	End of contract (Note: The situation was complicated. There was a dispute about the change over date of club operations from the previous owners to the new owners. There were also problems over unpaid wages to both the coaching staff and the players for the 2022 season. After the old ownership retook control of the club, they chose not to renew the contract for last year's coaching staff and instead looking for new coaching staffs.)	23 May 2023	Pre-season	(Indonesia) Budiardjo Thalib	1 July 2023
Persiraja	(Indonesia) Budiardjo Thalib	Sacked (Note: Thalib and his assistant, Fachmi Amiruddin, were sacked due to the two months of the team's preparation before the league started were deemed unsatisfactory after an evaluation by Persiraja's management.)	5 September 2023	Pre-season	(Indonesia) Achmad Zulkifli	6 September 2023
Persekat	(Indonesia) Miftahudin Mukson	Resigned	2 October 2023	3rd, (in Group 3)	(Indonesia) Lukman Afif (caretaker)	2 October 2023
Persijap	(Indonesia) Salahudin	Resigned	2 October 2023	7th, (in Group 1)	(Indonesia) Iman Suherman (caretaker) (Note: Persijap's management didn't technically choose a caretaker coach. Instead, the team chose the team's goalkeeping coach, Iman Suherman, to give instruction on the touchline while the team's captain, Qischil Gandrum Minny, led the team during training sessions until they could find Salahudin's replacement.)	2 October 2023
Perserang	(Indonesia) Lukas Tumbuan	Sacked	2 October 2023	6th, (in Group 2)	(Indonesia) Bonggo Pribadi	6 October 2023
PSMS	(Indonesia) Ridwan Saragih	Resigned	5 October 2023	3rd, (in Group 1)	(Indonesia) Miftahudin Mukson	5 October 2023
PSPS	(Indonesia) Jan Saragih	Mutual consent	9 October 2023	7th, (in Group 1)	(Indonesia) Basri (caretaker)	9 October 2023
PSPS	(Indonesia) Basri (caretaker)	End of caretaker role	11 October 2023	7th, (in Group 1)	(Indonesia) Ridwan Saragih	11 October 2023
Persijap	(Indonesia) Iman Suherman (caretaker)	End of caretaker role	13 October 2023	5th, (in Group 1)	(Indonesia) Alfiat	13 October 2023
Kalteng	(Indonesia) Jafri Sastra	Sacked	14 October 2023	6th, (in Group 4)	(Indonesia) Eko Tamamie (caretaker)	15 October 2023
PSDS	(Indonesia) Susanto	Resigned	14 October 2023	6th, (in Group 1)	(Indonesia) Zefrizal	17 October 2023
Persekat	(Indonesia) Lukman Afif (caretaker)	End of caretaker role	2 November 2023	6th, (in Group 3)	(Indonesia) Mial Balebata Armand	2 November 2023
Persiba	(Indonesia) Nil Maizar	Sacked	13 November 2023	7th, (in Group 4)	(Indonesia) Zainal Abidin (caretaker)	13 November 2023
Sriwijaya	(Indonesia) Yusup Prasetiyo	Sacked	13 November 2023	5th, (in Group 1)	(Indonesia) Hendri Susilo	14 November 2023
Gresik United	(Indonesia) Rudy Eka Priyambada	Resigned	19 November 2023	3rd, (in Group 3)	(Indonesia) Agus Indra Kurniawan	26 November 2023
Nusantara	(Indonesia) Rasiman	Mutual consent	22 November 2023	4th, (in Group 2)	(Indonesia) Guntur Cahyo Utomo (caretaker)	23 November 2023
Persiba	(Indonesia) Zainal Abidin (caretaker)	End of caretaker role	28 November 2023	7th, (in Group 4)	(Indonesia) Rudy Eka Priyambada	28 November 2023
Nusantara	(Indonesia) Guntur Cahyo Utomo (caretaker)	End of caretaker role	30 December 2023	Pre-relegation round	(Indonesia) Salahudin	30 December 2023

== Foreign players ==
PSSI, for the first time since 2014, allowed second division teams to sign foreign players after prohibiting clubs to register them for the past six editions. For this Liga 2 season, clubs were allowed to register two foreign players per team (with one of them coming from a member association of the AFC).

- Players named in **bold** indicates the player was registered during the mid-season transfer window.
- Former players named in italics are players that were out of squad or left the club within the season, after the pre-season transfer window, or in the mid-season transfer window, and at least had one appearance.

Team	Player 1	Player 2 (AFC)	Former players
Bekasi City	(Chad) Ezechiel N'Douassel	(Japan) Akihiro Suzuki	
Deltras	(Brazil) **Rosalvo Cândido**	(Timor-Leste) **Thiago Fernandes**	(Venezuela) José Hernández (Kyrgyzstan) Askarbek Saliev
Gresik United	(Spain) Víctor Bertomeu	(Japan) Renshi Yamaguchi	
Kalteng Putra	(Brazil) Willian Correia	(Japan) **Haru Nakagaki**	(Tajikistan) Nozim Babadjanov
Malut United	(Brazil) **Jose Wilkson**	(South Korea) **Jeong Ho-min**	(Ghana) Derrick Sasraku (Uzbekistan) Mukhammad Isaev
Nusantara United		(Japan) Yusaku Yamadera	(Brazil) Matheus Silva
Persekat	(Brazil) **Matheus Souza**	(Uzbekistan) Mirkomil Lokaev	(Brazil) Lucas Cardoso
Persela	(United States) Jonny Campbell	(South Korea) Kim Do-hyun	
Perserang	(Germany) Fatjon Celani	(Iran) Behnam Habibi	
Persewar	Without foreign players		
Persiba	(Nigeria) **Sunday Song**	(Iran) Ali Nouri Zangir	(Brazil) Luiz Junior
Persijap	(Haiti) **Kervens Belfort**	(Iran) Mojtaba Lotfi	(Japan) Haru Nakagaki
Persikab	(Guinea) **Sekou Sylla**	(Uzbekistan) Azamat Abdullayev	(Uzbekistan) Akhror Umarjonov
Persipa	(Central African Republic) Jacob Youmbi	(Tajikistan) **Shavkati Khotam**	(Iran) Amir Memari
Persipal BU	(Brazil) Thales Lima	(Iran) Taher Jahanbakhsh	
Persipura	(France) Enzo Célestine	(Kyrgyzstan) **Azamat Baymatov**	
Persiraja	(Mali) **Mahamane Touré**	(Uzbekistan) **Islom Karimov**	(Brazil) Ricardo Pires (Japan) Arata Takatori
PSBS	(Brazil) Alexsandro	(South Korea) **Hwang Do-yeon**	(Japan) Ryohei Miyazaki
PSCS	(Brazil) Rafinha	(Tajikistan) **Izzatullo Ruziev**	(Uzbekistan) Temur Masharipov
PSDS	(Japan) Noriki Akada	(Lebanon) **Ibrahim Bahsoun**	(Lesotho) Masoabi Nkoto
PSIM	(Brazil) **Augusto Neto**	(South Korea) **Kim Bong-jin**	(Serbia) Aleksandar Rakić (Philippines) Andreas Esswein
PSKC	(Afghanistan) Fareed Sadat	(Uzbekistan) **Mukhammadali Tursunov**	(Uzbekistan) Murodjon Tuychibaev
PSMS	(Colombia) **José Valencia**	(South Korea) **Kim Ki-su**	(Brazil) Matheus Souza (South Korea) Kim Jin-sung
PSPS	(Brazil) **Bruno Silva**	(Afghanistan) **Omid Popalzay**	(Serbia) Drago Maksimović (South Korea) Lee Min-woo
Sada Sumut	(Serbia) **Aleksandar Rakić**	(Japan) **Kei Sano**	(Uzbekistan) Akhrorbek Uktamov (Uzbekistan) Shokhnazar Norbekov
Semen Padang	(Nigeria) Kenneth Ngwoke	(South Korea) Kim Min-gyu	
Sriwijaya	(Ukraine) **Yevhen Bokhashvili**	(Bhutan) Chencho Gyeltshen	(Haiti) Kervens Belfort
Sulut United	(Brazil) **Jô Santos**	(Kyrgyzstan) **Aidar Mambetaliev**	

== Schedule ==
The schedule of the competition is as follows.

Schedule for preliminary round
Round	Draw date	Matchweek	Group 1	Group 2	Group 3	Group 4
Preliminary Round	No draw	Matchweek 1	10–11 September 2023			
Preliminary Round	No draw	Matchweek 2	16–17 September 2023	17–18 September 2023	16–18 September 2023	16–17 September 2023
Preliminary Round	No draw	Matchweek 3	24–25 September 2023			22–23 September 2023
Preliminary Round	No draw	Matchweek 4	30 September – 1 October 2023	30 September – 2 October 2023		27–29 September 2023
Preliminary Round	No draw	Matchweek 5	8–9 October 2023	9–10 October 2023	8–10 October 2023	4–7 October 2023
Preliminary Round	No draw	Matchweek 6	13–15 October 2023		14–15 October 2023	12–13 October 2023
Preliminary Round	No draw	Matchweek 7	21–23 October 2023		21–22 October 2023	19–20 October 2023
Preliminary Round	No draw	Matchweek 8	4–6 November 2023			2–4 November 2023
Preliminary Round	No draw	Matchweek 9	11–13 November 2023	12–13 November & 2 December 2023 (Note: Perserang vs Malut UNited match which scheduled on 11 November 2023 was postponed and was played on 2 December 2023.)	11–13 November 2023	11–12 November 2023
Preliminary Round	No draw	Matchweek 10	17–19 November 2023		18–19 November 2023	7 & 18 November 2023 (Note: Persewar vs Kalteng Putra match which by the schedule was originally to be played in the match week 10, was advanced to 7 November 2023.)
Preliminary Round	No draw	Matchweek 11	25–27 November 2023		25–27 November & 6 December 2023 (Note: Gresik United vs Persela match which was scheduled on 25 November 2023 was postponed and was played on 6 December 2023.)	23 November 2023
Preliminary Round	No draw	Matchweek 12	30 November – 2 December 2023	30 November & 8 December 2023 (Note: Perserang vs Persikab match which was scheduled on 2 December 2023 was rescheduled and was played on 8 December 2023.) (Note: Nusantara United vs Malut United match which was scheduled on 2 December 2023 was rescheduled and was played on 8 December 2023.)	30 November – 2 December 2023	28–30 November 2023
Preliminary Round	No draw	Matchweek 13	9–11 December 2023	13 December 2023 (Note: The matchweek 13 of Group 2 that was scheduled on 9–11 December 2023 was rescheduled and was played on 13 December 2023.)	8–11 December 2023	3–5 December 2023
Preliminary Round	No draw	Matchweek 14	17 December 2023	17–18 December 2023	17 December 2023	10 December 2023

Notes:

Schedule for championship round & relegation round
Matchweek	Championship round			Relegation round			
Matchweek	Group X	Group Y	Group Z	Group A	Group B	Group C	Group D
Matchweek 1	6 Januari 2024	7 Januari 2024	6 Januari 2024	7 Januari 2024	6 Januari 2024	7 Januari 2024	
Matchweek 2	12–13 January 2024	13 January 2024	12 January 2024		11 January 2024	12 January 2024	
Matchweek 3	17 January 2024	18 January 2024	17 January 2024	16 January 2024		17 January 2024	
Matchweek 4	22 January 2024	23 January 2024	22 January 2024	21 January 2024		22 January 2024	
Matchweek 5	27 January 2024	28 January 2024	27 January 2024	26 January 2024		27 January 2024	
Matchweek 6	3 February 2024			2 February 2024		3 February 2024	

Schedule for knockout round
Round	Draw date	Matchweek	Leg 1	Leg 2
Knockout Round	5 February 2024	Semi-finals	25 February 2024	29 February 2024
Knockout Round	5 February 2024	Third place play-off	5 March 2024	9 March 2024
Knockout Round	5 February 2024	Final	5 March 2024	9 March 2024

== Preliminary Round ==
A total of 28 teams will be drawn into 4 groups of seven teams based on the geographical location of their homebase. The preliminary round will be played in home-and-away round-robin matches.

The top three teams from each group will advance to the championship round. The bottom four teams from each group will advance to the relegation round.

=== Group 1 ===
Pos	Team	Pld	W	D	L	GF	GA	GD	Pts	Qualification	SMP	PRJ	MDN	SFC	PKU	SSU	PDS
1	Semen Padang	12	8	3	1	25	9	+16	27	Qualification to the Championship Round	—	4–0	2–2	3–0	1–1	2–1	2–0
2	Persiraja	12	5	6	1	15	10	+5	21	Qualification to the Championship Round	1–0	—	0–0	2–0	0–0	1–0	5–1
3	PSMS	12	3	8	1	16	13	+3	17	Qualification to the Championship Round	1–2	1–1	—	2–2	0–0	2–1	3–1
4	Sriwijaya (Note: Sriwijaya were deducted three points by the PSSI Disciplinary Committee for not including U-21 players in the starting XI in the match against Semen Padang on 1 October 2023.)	12	4	5	3	17	17	0	14	Qualification to the Relegation Round	0–3 (Note: This match initially ended with a score of Sriwijaya 1–1 Semen Padang. However, the PSSI disciplinary committee as of 24 October 2023 stated that the score was changed to Sriwijaya 0–3 Semen Padang, after Sriwijaya was found to have violated league regulations.)	0–0	2–2	—	4–2	2–0	3–0
5	PSPS	12	2	6	4	10	15	−5	12	Qualification to the Relegation Round	0–2	1–1	1–1	0–1	—	2–1	2–0
6	Sada Sumut	12	1	6	5	12	17	−5	9	Qualification to the Relegation Round	1–1	2–2	1–1	1–1	1–1	—	2–1
7	PSDS	12	1	2	9	12	26	−14	5	Qualification to the Relegation Round	2–3	1–2	0–1	2–2	3–0	1–1	—

Source: 2023–24 Liga 2
Legend: Blue = home team win; Yellow = draw; Red = away team win.
Rules for classification: 1) Points; 2) Head-to-head points; 3) Head-to-head goal difference; 4) Head-to-head goals scored; 5) Goal difference; 6) Goals scored; 7) Fair-play points; 8) Draw.

=== Group 2 ===
Pos	Team	Pld	W	D	L	GF	GA	GD	Pts	Qualification	FBC	MLT	JOG	NFC	SRG	PBB	PKC
1	Bekasi City	12	8	2	2	20	12	+8	26	Qualification to the Championship Round	—	2–0	3–1	5–3	0–1	1–0	2–0
2	Malut United	12	6	4	2	16	11	+5	22	Qualification to the Championship Round	1–1	—	0–1	2–1	3–2	2–1	3–0
3	PSIM	12	6	3	3	13	11	+2	21	Qualification to the Championship Round	2–3	1–1	—	0–1	1–0	1–0	1–1
4	Nusantara United	12	5	1	6	19	16	+3	16	Qualification to the Relegation Round	0–1	0–1	1–2	—	5–3	3–0	3–0
5	Perserang	12	5	0	7	14	14	0	15	Qualification to the Relegation Round	3–0	0–1	0–1	0–1	—	3–1	1–0
6	Persikab	12	3	4	5	12	16	−4	13	Qualification to the Relegation Round	1–1	1–1	1–1	0–0	1–0	—	3–1
7	PSKC	12	1	2	9	7	21	−14	5	Qualification to the Relegation Round	0–1	1–1	0–1	2–1	0–1	2–3	—

Source: 2023–24 Liga 2
Legend: Blue = home team win; Yellow = draw; Red = away team win.
Rules for classification: 1) Points; 2) Head-to-head points; 3) Head-to-head goal difference; 4) Head-to-head goals scored; 5) Goal difference; 6) Goals scored; 7) Fair-play points; 8) Draw.

=== Group 3 ===
Pos	Team	Pld	W	D	L	GF	GA	GD	Pts	Qualification	PSL	DTS	GRS	JAP	CLP	PTI	TGL
1	Persela	12	8	2	2	16	7	+9	26	Qualification to the Championship Round	—	1–0	1–0	2–0	3–0	1–3	3–1
2	Deltras	12	5	4	3	15	13	+2	19 (Note: Head-to-head points: Deltras 6, Gresik United 0.)	Qualification to the Championship Round	0–1	—	2–1	1–0	2–1	2–1	2–2
3	Gresik United	12	6	1	5	14	9	+5	19	Qualification to the Championship Round	0–0	1–2	—	1–0	3–0	2–0	2–0
4	Persijap	12	3	5	4	8	10	−2	14	Qualification to the Relegation Round	0–0	1–0	2–0	—	0–0	1–1	2–1
5	PSCS	12	3	4	5	10	16	−6	13	Qualification to the Relegation Round	0–1	1–1	1–3	3–1	—	2–1	1–0
6	Persipa	12	2	5	5	16	17	−1	11 (Note: Head-to-head points: Persipa 4, Persekat 1.)	Qualification to the Relegation Round	2–3	2–2	0–1	1–1	1–1	—	3–0
7	Persekat	12	2	5	5	8	15	−7	11	Qualification to the Relegation Round	1–0	1–1	1–0	0–0	0–0	1–1	—

Source: 2023–24 Liga 2
Legend: Blue = home team win; Yellow = draw; Red = away team win.
Rules for classification: 1) Points; 2) Head-to-head points; 3) Head-to-head goal difference; 4) Head-to-head goals scored; 5) Goal difference; 6) Goals scored; 7) Fair-play points; 8) Draw.

=== Group 4 ===
Pos	Team	Pld	W	D	L	GF	GA	GD	Pts	Qualification	BIK	WAR	PAL	PSP	SUT	KAL	BPP
1	PSBS	12	8	2	2	23	9	+14	26	Qualification to the Championship Round	—	3–0	1–1	3–1	1–0	1–0	3–0
2	Persewar	12	6	2	4	16	17	−1	20	Qualification to the Championship Round	2–1	—	2–2	2–1	2–1	2–1	1–0
3	Persipal BU	12	5	3	4	18	16	+2	18	Qualification to the Championship Round	1–2	2–1	—	2–0	3–1	1–0	2–2
4	Persipura	12	3	5	4	15	17	−2	14 (Note: Head-to-head points: Persipura 4, Sulut United 1.)	Qualification to the Relegation Round	1–1	2–0	3–1	—	2–1	2–2	1–1
5	Sulut United	12	4	2	6	11	14	−3	14	Qualification to the Relegation Round	0–1	2–0	2–1	0–0	—	0–0	1–0
6	Kalteng Putra	12	3	4	5	12	13	−1	13	Qualification to the Relegation Round	1–0	1–1	0–2	1–1	4–1	—	2–1
7	Persiba	12	3	2	7	13	22	−9	11	Qualification to the Relegation Round	2–6	1–3	2–0	3–1	0–2	1–0	—

Source: 2023–24 Liga 2
Legend: Blue = home team win; Yellow = draw; Red = away team win.
Rules for classification: 1) Points; 2) Head-to-head points; 3) Head-to-head goal difference; 4) Head-to-head goals scored; 5) Goal difference; 6) Goals scored; 7) Fair-play points; 8) Draw.

== Championship Round & Relegation Round ==
=== Championship Round ===
The twelve teams that advanced from the preliminary round were divided into 3 groups of four teams to play home-and-away round-robin matches.

Three group winners and the one best runner-up advanced to the knockout round.

==== Group X ====
Pos	Team	Pld	W	D	L	GF	GA	GD	Pts	Qualification
1	Semen Padang	6	2	4	0	5	2	+3	10	Qualification to the Knockout Round
2	Persiraja	6	2	3	1	6	3	+3	9 (Note: Head-to-head points: Persiraja 4, PSIM 1.)	Qualification to the Knockout Round
3	PSIM	6	2	3	1	7	7	0	9	
4	PSMS	6	0	2	4	3	9	−6	2	

Source: 2023–24 Liga 2
Rules for classification: 1) Points; 2) Head-to-head points; 3) Head-to-head goal difference; 4) Head-to-head goals scored; 5) Goal difference; 6) Goals scored; 7) Fair-play points; 8) Draw.
Notes:
6 January 2024
15:00 WIB (UTC+7)

PSMS	0–0	Persiraja
	Report

Baharuddin Siregar Stadium, Deli Serdang
Attendance: 0
Referee: Amri Nurhadi
6 January 2024
19:00 WIB (UTC+7)

Semen Padang	1–1	PSIM
Ngwoke 70'	Report	Sukarja 15'

Gelora Haji Agus Salim Stadium, Padang
Attendance: 8,126
Referee: Abdul Aziz

12 January 2024
15:00 WIB (UTC+7)

PSIM	2–1	PSMS
Faris 21'; Alfriyanto N. 27'	Report	Malau 67'

Mandala Krida Stadium, Yogyakarta
Attendance: 7,011
Referee: Subro Malisi
13 January 2024
15:30 WIB (UTC+7)

Persiraja	0–0	Semen Padang
	Report

Langsa Stadium, Langsa
Attendance: 2,254
Referee: Muhammad Tri Santoso

17 January 2024
15:00 WIB (UTC+7)

PSIM	1–1	Persiraja
Maring 75'	Report	Ferdinand 89'

Mandala Krida Stadium, Yogyakarta
Attendance: 6,567
Referee: Totok Fitrianto
17 January 2024
19:00 WIB (UTC+7)

Semen Padang	2–0	PSMS
Ihwan 48'; Asrizal 72'	Report

Gelora Haji Agus Salim Stadium, Padang
Attendance: 11,200
Referee: Steven Yubel Poli

22 January 2024
15:00 WIB (UTC+7)

PSMS	1–1	Semen Padang
I. Chan 33'	Report	Asrizal 52'

Baharuddin Siregar Stadium, Deli Serdang
Attendance: 1,702
Referee: Hamdi
22 January 2024
15:30 WIB (UTC+7)

Persiraja	3–1	PSIM
Karimov 21'; Ramadhan 34'; Vermansah 84'	Report	Sukarja 62'

Langsa Stadium, Langsa
Attendance: 1,345
Referee: Cahya Sugandi

27 January 2024
15:00 WIB (UTC+7)

PSIM	0–0	Semen Padang
	Report

Mandala Krida Stadium, Yogyakarta
Attendance: 9,161
Referee: Axel Febrian Sinaga
27 January 2024
15:30 WIB (UTC+7)

Persiraja	2–0	PSMS
Laly 73' (pen.); Ferdinand 88' (pen.)	Report

Langsa Stadium, Langsa
Attendance: 0
Referee: Agus Walyono

3 February 2024
15:00 WIB (UTC+7)

Semen Padang	1–0	Persiraja
Ihwan 6'	Report

Gelora Haji Agus Salim Stadium, Padang
Attendance: 11,000
Referee: Heru Cahyono
3 February 2024
15:00 WIB (UTC+7)

PSMS	1–2	PSIM
Sihaloho 79'	Report	Sukarja 21'; Sheva 75'

Baharuddin Siregar Stadium, Deli Serdang
Attendance: 873
Referee: Yudi Nurcahya

==== Group Y ====
Pos	Team	Pld	W	D	L	GF	GA	GD	Pts	Qualification
1	Malut United	6	2	4	0	9	6	+3	10	Qualification to the Knockout Round
2	Deltras	6	2	3	1	6	5	+1	9	
3	Persela	6	1	3	2	6	7	−1	6	
4	Bekasi City	6	1	2	3	8	11	−3	5	

Source: 2023–24 Liga 2
Rules for classification: 1) Points; 2) Head-to-head points; 3) Head-to-head goal difference; 4) Head-to-head goals scored; 5) Goal difference; 6) Goals scored; 7) Fair-play points; 8) Draw.
7 January 2024
15:00 WIB (UTC+7)

Bekasi City	1–1	Deltras
Hizbullah 77'	Report	Rosalvo 7'

Singaperbangsa Stadium, Karawang
Attendance: 422
Referee: Agus Fauzan Arifin
7 January 2024
19:00 WIB (UTC+7)

Malut United	0–0	Persela
	Report

PTIK Stadium, South Jakarta
Attendance: 392
Referee: Irul Hidayat

13 January 2024
15:00 WIB (UTC+7)

Deltras	1–1	Malut United
Dwiki M. 31'	Report	Wilkson 45'

Gelora Delta Stadium, Sidoarjo
Attendance: 2,937
Referee: Zetman Pangaribuan
13 January 2024
15:00 WIB (UTC+7)

Persela	3–1	Bekasi City
Do-hyun 18'; Ade Jantra 64'; Zulham Z. 80'	Report	Ghozali S. 10'

Tuban Sport Center Stadium, Tuban
Attendance: 4,344
Referee: Steven Yubel Poli

18 January 2024
15:00 WIB (UTC+7)

Bekasi City	2–2	Malut United
Ho-min 28' (o.g.); Sutopo 70'	Report	Wilkson 46'; Armaiyn 90+4'

Singaperbangsa Stadium, Karawang
Attendance: 466
Referee: Fibay Rahmatullah
18 January 2024
19:00 WIB (UTC+7)

Deltras	1–0	Persela
Ragil 14'	Report

Gelora Delta Stadium, Sidoarjo
Attendance: 4,636
Referee: Mansyur

23 January 2024
15:00 WIB (UTC+7)

Persela	0–0	Deltras
	Report

Tuban Sport Center Stadium, Tuban
Attendance: 4,296
Referee: Muhammad Iqballuddin
23 January 2024
19:00 WIB (UTC+7)

Malut United	2–0	Bekasi City
Gigis 32' (o.g.); Wilkson 47'	Report

Gelora Bung Karno Madya Stadium, Central Jakarta
Attendance: 683
Referee: Irfan Wahyu Wijanarko

28 January 2024
15:00 WIB (UTC+7)

Deltras	2–1	Bekasi City
Risal 16'; Wanggai 30' (pen.)	Report	Rifky 57'

Gelora Supriyadi Stadium, Blitar
Attendance: 833
Referee: Irul Hidayat
28 January 2024
15:00 WIB (UTC+7)

Persela	2–2	Malut United
Ade Jantra 26'; Al Achya 36'	Report	Wilkson 3', 21'

Tuban Sport Center Stadium, Tuban
Attendance: 4,568
Referee: Cahya Sugandi

3 February 2024
15:00 WIB (UTC+7)

Bekasi City	3–1	Persela
N'Douassel 19', 27'; Soni 54'	Report	Dzumafo 17'

Singaperbangsa Stadium, Karawang
Attendance: 0
Referee: Zetman Pangaribuan
3 February 2024
15:00 WIB (UTC+7)

Malut United	2–1	Deltras
Wawan 26'; Armaiyn 80'	Report	Saputro 90' (o.g.)

Gelora Bung Karno Madya Stadium, Central Jakarta
Attendance: 7,833
Referee: Thoriq Alkatiri

==== Group Z ====
Pos	Team	Pld	W	D	L	GF	GA	GD	Pts	Qualification
1	PSBS	6	5	1	0	10	3	+7	16	Qualification to the Knockout Round
2	Gresik United	6	2	2	2	6	5	+1	8	
3	Persewar	6	2	0	4	7	11	−4	6	
4	Persipal BU	6	1	1	4	6	10	−4	4	

Source: 2023–24 Liga 2
Rules for classification: 1) Points; 2) Head-to-head points; 3) Head-to-head goal difference; 4) Head-to-head goals scored; 5) Goal difference; 6) Goals scored; 7) Fair-play points; 8) Draw.
6 January 2024
15:00 WIT (UTC+9)

PSBS	1–0	Gresik United
Alexsandro 90+6' (pen.)	Report

Cendrawasih Stadium, Biak Numfor
Attendance: 2,200
Referee: Eko Saputra
6 January 2024
15:00 WITA (UTC+8)

Persipal BU	2–1	Persewar
I. Mofu 5'; Fikri 29'	Report	K. Youwei 18'

Gawalise Stadium, Palu
Attendance: 1,800
Referee: Muhammad Tri Santoso

12 January 2024
15:00 WIT (UTC+9)

Persewar	0–1	PSBS
	Report	Barry 17'

Mandala Stadium, Jayapura
Attendance: 1,425
Referee: Axel Febrian Sinaga
12 January 2024
15:00 WIB (UTC+7)

Gresik United	3–1	Persipal BU
Bertomeu 7'; Dicky 19'; Dimas 53'	Report	I. Mofu 21'

Gelora Joko Samudro Stadium, Gresik
Attendance: 0
Referee: Agus Walyono

17 January 2024
15:00 WIT (UTC+9)

PSBS	1–0	Persipal BU
Beto 32'	Report

Cendrawasih Stadium, Biak Numfor
Attendance: 1,722
Referee: Pipin Indra Pratama
17 January 2024
15:00 WIB (UTC+7)

Gresik United	0–1	Persewar
	Report	B. Solossa 56'

Gelora Joko Samudro Stadium, Gresik
Attendance: 0
Referee: Ridwan Pahala

22 January 2024
15:00 WIT (UTC+9)

Persewar	0–1	Gresik United
	Report	Bertomeu 68' (pen.)

Mandala Stadium, Jayapura
Attendance: 821
Referee: Irul Hidayat
22 January 2024
15:00 WITA (UTC+8)

Persipal BU	0–1	PSBS
	Report	Barry 17'

Gawalise Stadium, Palu
Attendance: 920
Referee: Subro Malisi

27 January 2024
15:00 WIT (UTC+9)

Persewar	3–2	Persipal BU
Fiktor 23'; B. Solossa 30'; Diop Wamu 68'	Report	Thales 59', 88'

Mandala Stadium, Jayapura
Attendance: 436
Referee: Amri Nurhadi
27 January 2024
15:00 WIB (UTC+7)

Gresik United	1–1	PSBS
Arif 25'	Report	Barry 81'

Untung Suropati Stadium, Pasuruan
Attendance: 0
Referee: Totok Fitrianto

3 February 2024
15:00 WIT (UTC+9)

PSBS	5–2	Persewar
Saha 9', 66'; Alexsandro 28', 46', 85'	Report	Diop Wamu 29'; K. Youwei 45'

Cendrawasih Stadium, Biak Numfor
Attendance: 2,074
Referee: Irfan Wahyu Wijanarko
3 February 2024
15:00 WITA (UTC+8)

Persipal BU	1–1	Gresik United
I. Mofu 86'	Report	Dimas 67'

Gawalise Stadium, Palu
Attendance: 829
Referee: Agus Fauzan Arifin

==== Ranking of runner-up teams ====
Pos	Grp	Team	Pld	W	D	L	GF	GA	GD	Pts	Qualification
1	X	Persiraja	6	2	3	1	6	3	+3	9	Qualification to the Knockout Round
2	Y	Deltras	6	2	3	1	6	5	+1	9	
3	Z	Gresik United	6	2	2	2	6	5	+1	8	

Source: 2023–24 Liga 2
Rules for classification: 1) Points; 2) Goal difference; 3) Goals scored; 4) Fair-play points; 5) Draw.

=== Relegation Round ===
The sixteen teams that advanced from the preliminary round were divided into 4 groups of four teams to play home-and-away round-robin matches.

The bottom two teams from each group will be relegated to 2024–25 Liga 3.

==== Group A ====
Pos	Team	Pld	W	D	L	GF	GA	GD	Pts	Relegation
1	Sriwijaya	6	4	2	0	10	2	+8	14	
2	PSKC	6	3	1	2	10	4	+6	10 (Note: Tied on head-to-head records. Overall goal difference is used as a tiebreaker.)	
3	Perserang (R)	6	3	1	2	6	6	0	10	Relegation to the 2024–25 Liga Nusantara
4	Sada Sumut (R)	6	0	0	6	6	20	−14	0	Relegation to the 2024–25 Liga Nusantara

Source: 2023–24 Liga 2
Rules for classification: 1) Points; 2) Head-to-head points; 3) Head-to-head goal difference; 4) Head-to-head goals scored; 5) Goal difference; 6) Goals scored; 7) Fair-play points; 8) Draw.
(R) Relegated
Notes:
7 January 2024
15:30 WIB (UTC+7)

Sriwijaya	0–0	PSKC
	Report

Gelora Sriwijaya Stadium, Palembang
Attendance: 1,757
Referee: Totok Fitrianto
7 January 2024
15:30 WIB (UTC+7)

Sada Sumut	1–3	Perserang
Akhova 83'	Report	Fatjon 33' (pen.); Rudiyana 52'; Riski Fajar 89'

Baharuddin Siregar Stadium, Deli Serdang
Attendance: 299
Referee: Yudi Nurcahya

12 January 2024
15:00 WIB (UTC+7)

PSKC	4–1	Sada Sumut
Efendi 14'; Tursunov 36'; Cahya 71'; Yusra 81'	Report	Aulia R. 45+4' (pen.)

Gelora Bandung Lautan Api Stadium, Bandung
Attendance: 263
Referee: Hamdi
12 January 2024
15:00 WIB (UTC+7)

Perserang	0–3	Sriwijaya
	Report	Fajar Z. 28'; Gyeltshen 33'; Bawuo 85' (pen.)

Maulana Yusuf Stadium, Serang
Attendance: 498
Referee: Choirudin

16 January 2024
15:00 WIB (UTC+7)

PSKC	1–0	Perserang
I. Sayuri 30'	Report

Gelora Bandung Lautan Api Stadium, Bandung
Attendance: 118
Referee: Heru Cahyono
16 January 2024
15:00 WIB (UTC+7)

Sriwijaya	3–1	Sada Sumut
Koroy 46'; Gyeltshen 59'; Darmawan 90'	Report	A. Rakić 30'

Gelora Sriwijaya Stadium, Palembang
Attendance: 1,201
Referee: Thoriq Alkatiri

21 January 2024
15:00 WIB (UTC+7)

Perserang	1–0	PSKC
Zakaria 76'	Report

Maulana Yusuf Stadium, Serang
Attendance: 824
Referee: Zetman Pangaribuan
21 January 2024
15:30 WIB (UTC+7)

Sada Sumut	1–3	Sriwijaya
Ramadhoni 13'	Report	Gyeltshen 38'; Koroy 85'; Bawuo 90'

Baharuddin Siregar Stadium, Deli Serdang
Attendance: 274
Referee: Heru Cahyono

26 January 2024
15:00 WIB (UTC+7)

PSKC	0–1	Sriwijaya
	Report	Darmawan 12'

Gelora Bandung Lautan Api Stadium, Bandung
Attendance: 315
Referee: Fibay Rahmatullah
26 January 2024
15:00 WIB (UTC+7)

Perserang	2–1	Sada Sumut
Rizki A. 42'; Fatjon 77' (pen.)	Report	Akhova 18'

Maulana Yusuf Stadium, Serang
Attendance: 450
Referee: Pipin Indra Pratama

2 February 2024
15:00 WIB (UTC+7)

Sriwijaya	0–0	Perserang
	Report

Gelora Sriwijaya Stadium, Palembang
Attendance: 1,832
Referee: Naufal Adya Fairuski
2 February 2024
15:00 WIB (UTC+7)

Sada Sumut	1–5	PSKC
Rustam 35'	Report	Dicky K. 33'; Maulana 39', 42'; Suhandi 61'; Fauzi 66'

Baharuddin Siregar Stadium, Deli Serdang
Attendance: 101
Referee: Muhammad Tri Santoso

==== Group B ====
Pos	Team	Pld	W	D	L	GF	GA	GD	Pts	Relegation
1	Nusantara United	6	3	1	2	15	11	+4	10	
2	PSPS	6	2	3	1	9	7	+2	9	
3	PSDS (R)	6	1	3	2	12	17	−5	6 (Note: Head-to-head points: PSDS 4, Persikab 1.)	Relegation to the 2024–25 Liga Nusantara
4	Persikab (R)	6	1	3	2	9	10	−1	6	Relegation to the 2024–25 Liga Nusantara

Source: 2023–24 Liga 2
Rules for classification: 1) Points; 2) Head-to-head points; 3) Head-to-head goal difference; 4) Head-to-head goals scored; 5) Goal difference; 6) Goals scored; 7) Fair-play points; 8) Draw.
(R) Relegated
Notes:
6 January 2024
15:00 WIB (UTC+7)

Nusantara United	7–3	PSDS
Aronggear 10'; M. Silva 26', 54', 76'; Kardinata 51', 88'; Yamadera 90'	Report	Wiranda 23'; Lesmana 59'; Salim 72'

Kebo Giro Stadium, Boyolali
Attendance: 475
Referee: Naufal Adya Fairuski
6 January 2024
15:00 WIB (UTC+7)

Persikab	1–1	PSPS
Sylla 66'	Report	B. Silva 61' (pen.)

Gelora Bandung Lautan Api Stadium, Bandung
Attendance: 80
Referee: Pipin Indra Pratama

11 January 2024
15:30 WIB (UTC+7)

PSDS	2–1	Persikab
Akada 55' (pen.); Yoga P. 90+3'	Report	Abdullaev 3'

Baharuddin Siregar Stadium, Deli Serdang
Attendance: 205
Referee: Muhammad Iqballuddin
11 January 2024
15:30 WIB (UTC+7)

PSPS	1–2	Nusantara United
Popalzay 34' (pen.)	Report	Izdihar 4'; M. Silva 25'

Kaharudin Nasution Stadium, Pekanbaru
Attendance: 1,752
Referee: Cahya Sugandi

16 January 2024
15:00 WIB (UTC+7)

Nusantara United	3–2	Persikab
Scifo 44'; Pandi L. 45', 76'	Report	Gufron 7'; Firman 56'

Kebo Giro Stadium, Boyolali
Attendance: 450
Referee: Amri Nurhadi
16 January 2024
15:30 WIB (UTC+7)

PSDS	1–3	PSPS
Akada 42' (pen.)	Report	B. Silva 15'; Dama 80'; Septian 85'

Baharuddin Siregar Stadium, Deli Serdang
Attendance: 320
Referee: Irul Hidayat

21 January 2024
15:00 WIB (UTC+7)

Persikab	1–0	Nusantara United
Abdullaev 41'	Report

Gelora Bandung Lautan Api Stadium, Bandung
Attendance: 56
Referee: Axel Febrian Sinaga
21 January 2024
15:30 WIB (UTC+7)

PSPS	1–1	PSDS
B. Silva 55'	Report	Lesmana 90'

Kaharudin Nasution Stadium, Pekanbaru
Attendance: 0
Referee: Yudi Nurcahya

26 January 2024
15:30 WIB (UTC+7)

PSDS	2–2	Nusantara United
Akada 55' (pen.); Salim 61'	Report	Afhridzal 87'; Pandi L. 90'

Baharuddin Siregar Stadium, Deli Serdang
Attendance: 303
Referee: Agung Setiyawan
26 January 2024
15:30 WIB (UTC+7)

PSPS	1–1	Persikab
Yudhi P. 54'	Report	Sylla 84'

Kaharudin Nasution Stadium, Pekanbaru
Attendance: 1,833
Referee: Heru Cahyono

2 February 2024
15:00 WIB (UTC+7)

Nusantara United	1–2	PSPS
Sansan 90'	Report	Yasir 7'; Septian 43'

Kebo Giro Stadium, Boyolali
Attendance: 475
Referee: Abdul Aziz
2 February 2024
15:00 WIB (UTC+7)

Persikab	3–3	PSDS
Abdullaev 4'; Sylla 51'; Gufroni 54'	Report	Akada 31', 33'; Yudha 71'

Gelora Bandung Lautan Api Stadium, Bandung
Attendance: 52
Referee: Eko Saputra

==== Group C ====
Pos	Team	Pld	W	D	L	GF	GA	GD	Pts	Relegation
1	Persijap	6	5	0	1	15	7	+8	15	
2	Persipa	6	3	1	2	7	7	0	10	
3	Sulut United (R)	6	2	1	3	7	12	−5	7	Relegation to the 2024–25 Liga Nusantara
4	Persiba (R)	6	1	0	5	6	9	−3	3	Relegation to the 2024–25 Liga Nusantara

Source: 2023–24 Liga 2
Rules for classification: 1) Points; 2) Head-to-head points; 3) Head-to-head goal difference; 4) Head-to-head goals scored; 5) Goal difference; 6) Goals scored; 7) Fair-play points; 8) Draw.
(R) Relegated
7 January 2024
15:00 WIB (UTC+7)

Persijap	1–0	Persiba
Hidayat 57'	Report

Gelora Bumi Kartini Stadium, Jepara
Attendance: 3,175
Referee: Zetman Pangaribuan
7 January 2024
15:00 WIB (UTC+7)

Persipa	0–0	Sulut United
	Report

Joyokusumo Stadium, Pati
Attendance: 1,320
Referee: Heru Cahyono

12 January 2024
15:00 WITA (UTC+8)

Sulut United	1–3	Persijap
Noprihanis 73' (pen.)	Report	Fahmi 38'; Hidayat 64'; Qischil 89'

Klabat Stadium, Manado
Attendance: 692
Referee: Yudi Nurcahya
12 January 2024
16:00 WITA (UTC+8)

Persiba	3–0	Persipa
Song 38' (pen.), 60'; Ardiana 84'	Report

Batakan Stadium, Balikpapan
Attendance: 922
Referee: Irfan Wahyu Wijanarko

17 January 2024
15:00 WIB (UTC+7)

Persijap	2–0	Persipa
Afghoni 16'; Hidayat 73'	Report

Kebo Giro Stadium, Boyolali
Attendance: 0
Referee: Agus Walyono
17 January 2024
19:00 WITA (UTC+8)

Persiba	1–2	Sulut United
Ardiana 41'	Report	Noprihanis 56'; Karundeng 73'

Batakan Stadium, Balikpapan
Attendance: 2,042
Referee: Agung Setiyawan

22 January 2024
15:00 WITA (UTC+8)

Sulut United	1–0	Persiba
Noprihanis 63'	Report

Klabat Stadium, Manado
Attendance: 657
Referee: Thoriq Alkatiri
22 January 2024
15:00 WIB (UTC+7)

Persipa	3–0	Persijap
Youmbi 50' (pen.); Haryanto 66', 81'	Report

Joyokusumo Stadium, Pati
Attendance: 665
Referee: Choirudin

27 January 2024
15:00 WITA (UTC+8)

Sulut United	2–3	Persipa
Rusni 64'; Noprihanis 79'	Report	Marsi 14'; Witoyo 75'; Haryanto 90'

Klabat Stadium, Manado
Attendance: 1,624
Referee: Naufal Adya Fairuski
27 January 2024
16:00 WITA (UTC+8)

Persiba	2–4	Persijap
Tama 84'; Komboy 90'	Report	Belfort 48', 82'; Arya 51'; Minny 90'

Batakan Stadium, Balikpapan
Attendance: 402
Referee: Ridwan Pahala

3 February 2024
15:00 WIB (UTC+7)

Persijap	5–1	Sulut United
Kallon 21', 60'; Wibnu 50'; Belfort 77'; Nur Samsu 82' (pen.)	Report	Panto 46'

Mochtar Stadium, Pemalang
Attendance: 502
Referee: Muhammad Iqballuddin
3 February 2024
15:00 WIB (UTC+7)

Persipa	1–0	Persiba
Haryanto 58' (pen.)	Report

Joyokusumo Stadium, Pati
Attendance: 2,408
Referee: Subro Malisi

==== Group D ====
Pos	Team	Pld	W	D	L	GF	GA	GD	Pts	Relegation
1	Persipura	6	3	2	1	6	4	+2	11	
2	Persekat	6	2	3	1	7	4	+3	9 (Note: Tied on head-to-head records. Overall goal difference is used as a tiebreaker.)	
3	PSCS (R)	6	3	0	3	8	6	+2	9	Relegation to the 2024–25 Liga Nusantara
4	Kalteng Putra (Note: Kalteng Putra were deducted nine points by the PSSI Disciplinary Committee.) (R)	6	1	1	4	4	11	−7	−5	Relegation to the 2024–25 Liga Nusantara

Source: 2023–24 Liga 2
Rules for classification: 1) Points; 2) Head-to-head points; 3) Head-to-head goal difference; 4) Head-to-head goals scored; 5) Goal difference; 6) Goals scored; 7) Fair-play points; 8) Draw.
(R) Relegated
Notes:
7 January 2024
15:00 WIT (UTC+9)

Persipura	0–0	Persekat
	Report

Mandala Stadium, Jayapura
Attendance: 1,874
Referee: Agung Setiyawan
7 January 2024
15:00 WIB (UTC+7)

Kalteng Putra	2–1	PSCS
Guy Junior 62' (pen.); A. Oropa 90'	Report	Arif A. M. 86'

Tuah Pahoe Stadium, Palangka Raya
Attendance: 0
Referee: Thoriq M. Alkatiri

12 January 2024
15:00 WIB (UTC+7)

Persekat	1–1	Kalteng Putra
Kahar M. 21'	Report	Usman D. 85'

Mochtar Stadium, Pemalang
Attendance: 888
Referee: Heru Cahyono
12 January 2024
15:00 WIB (UTC+7)

PSCS	2–1	Persipura
Rafinha 20', 90+7'	Report	Rumakiek 74'

Wijayakusuma Stadium, Cilacap
Attendance: 1,640
Referee: Louis Ridho Muhammad

17 January 2024
15:00 WIT (UTC+9)

Persipura	1–0	Kalteng Putra
Rumakiek 18'	Report

Mandala Stadium, Jayapura
Attendance: 1,415
Referee: Abdul Aziz
17 January 2024
15:00 WIB (UTC+7)

Persekat	2–1	PSCS
Komarodin 31'; Wirdan Jaka 48'	Report	Arthur Sena 90'

Mochtar Stadium, Pemalang
Attendance: 623
Referee: Naufal Adya Fairuski

22 January 2024
15:00 WIB (UTC+7)

PSCS	1–0	Persekat
Arthur Sena 58'	Report

Wijayakusuma Stadium, Cilacap
Attendance: 1,489
Referee: Agung Setiyawan
22 January 2024
15:00 WIB (UTC+7)

Kalteng Putra	1–2	Persipura
Aibekob 89'	Report	Rumakiek 64', 77'

Tuah Pahoe Stadium, Palangka Raya
Attendance: 0
Referee: Naufal Adya Fairuski

27 January 2024
15:00 WIB (UTC+7)

Persekat	1–1	Persipura
Kahar M. 46'	Report	Baymatov 10'

Mochtar Stadium, Pemalang
Attendance: 1,200
Referee: Irfan Wahyu Wijanarko
27 January 2024
15:30 WIB (UTC+7)

PSCS	3–0 Awarded (Note: The match was awarded as a 3–0 victory to PSCS, after Kalteng Putra did not send their team for the match due to ongoing salary payment dispute with the team's management.)	Kalteng Putra
	Report

Wijayakusuma Stadium, Cilacap
Attendance: 70
Referee: Zetman Pangaribuan

3 February 2024
15:00 WIT (UTC+9)

Persipura	1–0	PSCS
Célestine 65'	Report

Mandala Stadium, Jayapura
Attendance: 3,782
Referee: Choirudin
3 February 2024
15:00 WIB (UTC+7)

Kalteng Putra	0–3 Awarded (Note: The match was awarded as a 3–0 victory to Persekat, after Kalteng Putra did not send their team for the match due to ongoing salary payment dispute with the team's management.)	Persekat
	Report

Tuah Pahoe Stadium, Palangka Raya
Attendance: 0
Referee: Totok Fitrianto

== Knockout Round ==
In the knockout round, the 4 teams that advanced from championship round played against each other over two legs on a home-and-away basis. The champions, runner-up and third place of 2023–24 Liga 2 will be promoted to 2024–25 Liga 1.

=== Bracket ===
Semi-finals
Persiraja	1	0	1
PSBS	1	4	5
Malut United	1	0	1
Semen Padang	1	1	2

Final
PSBS	3	3	6
Semen Padang	0	0	0
Third place play-off
Persiraja	0	2	2
Malut United (a.e.t.)	0	3	3

=== Semi-finals ===
25 February 2024
15:30 WIB (UTC+7)

Persiraja	1–1	PSBS
Al Muzanni 60'	Report	Alexsandro 51'

Langsa Stadium, Langsa
Attendance: 3,752
Referee: Zetman Pangaribuan
29 February 2024
14:30 WIT (UTC+9)

PSBS	4–0	Persiraja
Alexsandro 37', 64'; Beto 47', 51'	Report

Cendrawasih Stadium, Biak Numfor
Attendance: 4,050
Referee: Steven Yubel Poli

PSBS won 5–1 on aggregate and promoted to 2024–25 Liga 1.

25 February 2024
19:00 WIB (UTC+7)

Malut United	1–1	Semen Padang
Hari Nur 89'	Report	Juliansyah 41'

Gelora Bung Karno Madya Stadium, Central Jakarta
Attendance: 6,488
Referee: Irfan Wahyu Wijanarko
29 February 2024
15:00 WIB (UTC+7)

Semen Padang	1–0	Malut United
Ahmad Ihwan 23'	Report

Gelora Haji Agus Salim Stadium, Padang
Attendance: 11,400
Referee: Muhammad Iqballuddin

Semen Padang won 2–1 on aggregate and promoted to 2024–25 Liga 1.

=== Third place play-off ===
5 March 2024
15:30 WIB (UTC+7)

Persiraja	0–0	Malut United
	Report

Langsa Stadium, Langsa
Attendance: 751
Referee: Cahya Sugandi
9 March 2024
15:00 WIB (UTC+7)

Malut United	3–2 (a.e.t.)	Persiraja
Frets 45+9' (pen.); Mustaine 104'; Wilkson 115'	Report	Ferdiansyah 32' (pen.); Ramadhan 91'

Gelora Bung Karno Madya Stadium, Central Jakarta
Attendance: 6,781
Referee: Muhammad Tri Santoso

Malut United won 3–2 on aggregate and promoted to 2024–25 Liga 1.

=== Final ===
5 March 2024
15:00 WIT (UTC+9)

PSBS	3–0	Semen Padang
Ardiansyah 27' (o.g.); Alexsandro 45'; Beto 79'	Report

Cendrawasih Stadium, Biak Numfor
Attendance: 2,483
Referee: Fibay Rahmatullah
9 March 2024
19:00 WIB (UTC+7)

Semen Padang	0–3	PSBS
	Report	Beto 12', 50'; Alexsandro 28'

Gelora Haji Agus Salim Stadium, Padang
Attendance: 11,400
Referee: Amri Nurhadi

PSBS won 6–0 on aggregate and wins Liga 2.

== Promoted and relegated teams ==
=== Promotion to the 2024–25 Liga 1 ===
Team	Method of promotion	Date of promotion	Promoted to
PSBS	[[Semi-final winner]]	29 February 2024	2024–25 Liga 1
Semen Padang	[[Semi-final winner]]	29 February 2024	2024–25 Liga 1
Malut United	[[Third place play-off winner]]	9 March 2024	2024–25 Liga 1

=== Relegation to the 2024–25 Liga 3 ===
Team	Method of relegation	Date of relegation	Relegated to
Sada Sumut	[[Fourth-placed team of relegation round Group A]]	21 January 2024	2024–25 Liga 3
Persiba	[[Fourth-placed team of relegation round Group C]]	27 January 2024	2024–25 Liga 3
Kalteng Putra	[[Fourth-placed team of relegation round Group D]]	27 January 2024	2024–25 Liga 3
Perserang	[[Third-placed team of relegation round Group A]]	2 February 2024	2024–25 Liga 3
PSDS	[[Third-placed team of relegation round Group B]]	2 February 2024	2024–25 Liga 3
Persikab	[[Fourth-placed team of relegation round Group B]]	2 February 2024	2024–25 Liga 3
Sulut United	[[Third-placed team of relegation round Group C]]	3 February 2024	2024–25 Liga 3
PSCS	[[Third-placed team of relegation round Group D]]	3 February 2024	2024–25 Liga 3

== Season statistics ==
=== Top goalscorers ===
As of 10 March 2024

Rank	Player	Team	Goals
1	(Brazil) Alexsandro	PSBS	19
2	(Brazil) Matheus Silva	Nusantara United	14
3	(Nigeria) Kenneth Ngwoke	Semen Padang	13
4	(Chad) Ezechiel N'Douassel	Bekasi City	10
4	(Indonesia) Irvan Mofu	Persipal BU	10
4	(Indonesia) Ramai Rumakiek	Persipura	10
7	(Brazil) Rafinha	PSCS	9
8	(Brazil) Jose Wilkson	Malut United	8
8	(Indonesia) Boaz Solossa	Persewar	8
8	(Indonesia) Mamadou Barry	PSBS	8
8	(Japan) Noriki Akada	PSDS	8
8	(Indonesia) Rossy Noprihanis	Sulut United	8
13	(Spain) Víctor Bertomeu	Gresik United	7
13	(Indonesia) Guy Junior	Kalteng Putra	7
13	(Uzbekistan) Azamat Abdullaev	Persikab	7
13	(Brazil) Thales Lima	Persipal BU	7
13	(Indonesia) Ahmad Ihwan	Semen Padang	7
18	8 players	various clubs	6
26	8 players	various clubs	5
34	17 players	various clubs	4
51	22 players	various clubs	3
73	48 players	various clubs	2
121	128 players	various clubs	1

=== Top assists ===
As of 12 November 2023

Rank	Player	Team	Assists
1	(Indonesia) Gustur Cahyo	Persipa	4
2	(Indonesia) Hambali Tolib	Bekasi City	3
2	(Indonesia) Hamsa Lestaluhu	Nusantara United	3
2	(Iran) Ali Nouri Zangir	Persiba	3
2	(Indonesia) Rifal Bustan	Persipal	3
2	(Uzbekistan) Mukhammad Isaev	Malut United	3
7	(Indonesia) Raka Cahyana	Deltras	2
7	(Indonesia) Lee Yu-jun	Persela	2
7	(Indonesia) Beto Gonçalves	PSBS	2
7	(Indonesia) Rian Ramadan	Sada Sumut	2
11	Numerous players	Various club	1

=== Hat-tricks ===
As of 6 January 2024

Player	For	Against	Result	Date
(Chad) Ezechiel N'Douassel	Bekasi City	PSIM	3–2 (A)	11 September 2023
(Nigeria) Kenneth Ngwoke	Semen Padang	PSDS	3–2 (A)	4 November 2023
(Indonesia) Habibi Jusuf	Sriwijaya	PSDS	3–0 (H)	19 November 2023
(Brazil) Alexsandro	PSBS	Persiba	6–2 (A)	23 November 2023
(Brazil) Matheus Silva^{4}	Nusantara United	Perserang	5–3 (H)	27 November 2023
(Spain) Víctor Bertomeu	Gresik United	PSCS	3–0 (H)	17 December 2023
(Brazil) Matheus Silva	Nusantara United	PSDS	7–3 (H)	6 January 2024

- ^{4} Player scored 4 goals

=== Own goals ===
As of 23 January 2024

Player	Club	Against	Date
(Indonesia) Ragil Dimas	Persipal BU	Sulut United	16 September 2023
(Indonesia) Dia Syayid	Sriwijaya	Semen Padang	1 October 2023
(Indonesia) Komang Tri	Nusantara United	Malut United	9 October 2023
(Central African Republic) Jacob Youmbi	Persipa	Deltras	15 October 2023
(Indonesia) Airlangga Mutamasidqina	Gresik United	Persijap	10 December 2023
(Indonesia) Tri Rahmad Priadi	PSKC	Perserang	17 December 2023
(South Korea) Jeong Ho-min	Malut United	Bekasi City	18 January 2024
(Indonesia) Adittia Gigis	Bekasi City	Malut United	23 January 2024

=== Clean sheets ===
As of 23 October 2023

Rank	Player	Club	Clean sheets
1	(Indonesia) Muhammad Fahri	Persiraja	4
2	(Indonesia) Harlan Suardi	Bekasi City	3
2	(Indonesia) Lutfi Mutohar	Nusantara United	3
2	(Indonesia) Geril Kapoh	Sulut United	3
5	(Indonesia) Ulul Arham	Gresik United	2
5	(Indonesia) Teddy Heri Setiawan	Persekat	2
5	(Indonesia) Samuel Reimas	Persela	2
5	(Indonesia) Yogi Triana	Persela	2
5	(Indonesia) Imam Arief Fadillah	Perserang	2
5	(Indonesia) Panggih Prio	PSBS	2
5	(Indonesia) Chairil Zul Azhar	PSCS	2
5	(Indonesia) Fakhrurrazi Quba	Semen Padang	2
13	18 players	Various clubs	1

=== Discipline ===
As of 9 October 2023

- Most yellow card(s) : 4
  - (Uzbekistan) Mukhammad Isaev (Malut United)
- Most red card(s) : 2
  - (Indonesia) Elvis Harewan (Persewar)

== Attendances ==
Note: Excluding matches played behind closed door.

Pos	Team	Total	High	Low	Average	Change
1	Persiraja	75,235	31,000	6,745	15,047	+141.9%
2	Semen Padang	71,286	11,500	9,186	11,881	+28.2%
3	PSIM	55,197	9,983	8,129	9,200	−24.4%
4	Persipura	42,471	10,121	4,021	8,494	−12.5%
5	Persela	35,729	7,500	3,227	5,955	+91.8%
6	PSPS	34,177	7,280	3,691	5,696	+17.2%
7	PSMS	33,086	6,967	2,173	5,514	+18.1%
8	Persijap	31,517	7,500	752	5,253	−37.7%
9	Sriwijaya	31,334	5,700	2,801	5,222	+233.0%
10	Deltras	28,914	7,283	1,443	4,819	+164.9%
11	Persipal BU	20,000	4,200	1,800	2,857	−24.2%
12	PSBS	19,151	4,055	1,740	2,736	+2.8%
13	Gresik United	18,181	5,747	3,712	4,545	+40.4%
14	Persewar	16,884	9,512	729	2,814	−45.2%
15	PSCS	14,594	4,082	1,000	2,432	−16.9%
16	Persiba	13,394	5,284	932	2,232	−49.9%
17	PSDS	10,840	2,500	252	1,747	−52.7%
18	Sulut United	10,667	3,007	760	1,778	−0.2%
19	Persipa	9,506	3,870	636	1,901	−45.2%
20	Persekat	7,446	2,027	828	1,241	−63.0%
21	Perserang	7,208	3,135	311	1,201	−32.9%
22	Kalteng Putra	7,180	3,012	290	1,197	−76.8%
23	Bekasi City	4,429	2,654	75	738	−64.6%
24	Nusantara United	3,377	862	375	563	+1,555.9%
25	Sada Sumut	2,017	747	126	403	−49.7%
26	Malut United	1,965	435	250	328	+228.0%
27	PSKC	1,356	431	250	339	+61.4%
28	Persikab	921	242	139	184	−92.0%
	League total	608,062	31,000	75	3,577	−1.0%

Updated to games played on 6 January 2024
Source: Liga 2 2023–24

== Awards ==
=== Half of season awards ===
Awards	Winner	Club	Ref.
Best player	(Chad) Ezechiel N'Douassel	Bekasi City	
Best young player	(Indonesia) Zikri Ferdiansyah	Persiraja	
Best coach	(Indonesia) Djadjang Nurdjaman	Persela	
Best goal	(Indonesia) Januar Eka	Deltras	
Best assist	(Indonesia) Ruben Sanadi	PSBS	
Best save	(Indonesia) Bimasakti Andiko	Deltras	

=== Full season awards ===
Awards	Winner	Club	Ref.
Topscorer	(Brazil) Alexsandro	PSBS Biak	
Best player	(Brazil) Alexsandro	PSBS Biak	
Best young player	(Indonesia) Firman Juliansyah	Semen Padang	
Best coach	(Indonesia) Delfi Adri	Semen Padang	
Fair play team	PSBS Biak		

=== Team of the season ===
Pos.	Player	Team
GK	(Indonesia) Mario Londok	PSBS Biak
DF	(Indonesia) Raka Cahyana	Deltras
DF	(South Korea) Kim Min-gyu	Semen Padang
DF	(Indonesia) Zikri Ferdiansyah	Persiraja
DF	(Indonesia) Ruben Sanadi	PSBS Biak
MF	(Indonesia) Rosad Setiawan	Semen Padang
MF	(Indonesia) Diandra Diaz	PSBS Biak
MF	(Indonesia) Kaka Youwe	Persewar
FW	(Indonesia) Frets Butuan	Malut United
FW	(Indonesia) Firman Juliansyah	Semen Padang
FW	(Brazil) Alexsandro	PSBS Biak

== See also ==
- 2023–24 Liga 1
- 2023–24 Liga 3
