= Setiawan =

Setiawan is an Indonesian surname. Notable people with the surname include:

- Ade Iwan Setiawan (born 1984), Indonesian footballer
- Ady Setiawan (born 1994), Indonesian footballer
- Andi Setiawan (born 1984), Indonesian footballer
- Arif Setiawan (born 1996), Indonesian footballer
- Dedik Setiawan (born 1994), Indonesian footballer
- Denny Setiawan (born 1980), Indonesian badminton player
- Dwika Tjahja Setiawan (born 1966), commodore in the Indonesian Navy
- Eka Febri Yogi Setiawan (born 2000), Indonesian footballer
- Erik Setiawan (born 1983), Indonesian former footballer
- Fredy Setiawan (born 1991), Indonesian para badminton player
- Hari Setiawan (born 1970), Indonesian weightlifter
- Hendra Setiawan (born 1984), Indonesian badminton player
- Heri Setiawan (born 1987), Indonesian-born Bahraini male badminton player
- Indra Setiawan (born 1990), Indonesian footballer
- Leo Setiawan, Indonesian heavy metal musician
- Loudry Setiawan (born 1991), Indonesian former footballer
- Mariska Setiawan (born 1990), Indonesian soprano
- Modestus Setiawan (born 1982), Indonesian footballer
- Novri Setiawan (born 1993), Indonesian footballer
- Rosad Setiawan (born 1996), Indonesian footballer
- Rudi Setiawan (born 1993), Indonesian semi-professional footballer
- Soni Setiawan (born 1993), Indonesian footballer
- Teddy Heri Setiawan (born 1991), Indonesian footballer
