= Saputra =

Saputra is an Indonesian surname. Notable people with the surname include:

- Angga Saputro (born 1993), Indonesian footballer
- Dany Saputra (born 1991), Indonesian footballer
- Eko Roni Saputra (born 1991), Indonesian mixed martial artist
- Frendi Saputra (born 1992), Indonesian footballer
- Govinda Julian Saputra (born 1996), Indonesian basketball player
- Hanny Saputra (born 1965), Indonesian director
- Harry Saputra (born 1981), retired Indonesian footballer
- Hendri Saputra (born 1981), Indonesian-born Singaporean retired badminton player
- Herwin Tri Saputra (born 1991), Indonesian footballer
- Jimmi Saputra (born 1972), Indonesian technology entrepreneur and businessman
- Leo Saputra (born 1980), Indonesian footballer
- Miswar Saputra (born 1996), Indonesian footballer
- Nicholas Saputra (born 1984), Indonesian actor and film producer
- Ramadhan Saputra (born 1986), Indonesian footballer
- Rendi Saputra (born 1989), Indonesian footballer
- Rendy Saputra (born 1989), Indonesian footballer
- Riski Fajar Saputra (born 2000), Indonesian footballer
- Ruly Saputra (born 1988), Indonesian footballer
- Surya Saputra (born 1975), Indonesian actor, singer, and model
- Surya Saputra (wrestler) (born 1967), Indonesian wrestler
- Widya Saputra (born 1985), Indonesian TV presenter
