= Alexsandro (footballer, born 1997) =

Brazilian footballer

Personal information
- Full name: Alexsandro dos Santos Ferreira
- Date of birth: 3 April 1997 (age 29)
- Place of birth: Brazil
- Height: 1.75 m (5 ft 9 in)
- Position: Forward

Team information
- Current team: Persipura Jayapura
- Number: 97

Youth career
- 2015: Bahia
- 2016–2017: Ypiranga

Senior career*
Years	Team	Apps	(Gls)
2018–2019	Qormi	11	(0)
2019–2020	Mqabba	31	(16)
2021–2022	Parnahyba	8	(0)
2022	Maranguape	8	(1)
2022–2023	Shijiazhuang Gongfu	14	(4)
2023–2025	PSBS Biak	53	(32)
2025–2026	Barito Putera	23	(8)
2026–	Persipura Jayapura	1	(3)
- * Club domestic league appearances and goals as of 17 October 2026

Alexsandro dos Santos Ferreira (born 3 April 1997), simply known as Alexsandro, is a Brazilian professional footballer who plays as a forward for Championship club Persipura Jayapura.

== Club career ==
=== Shijiazhuang Gongfu ===
In August 2022, Alexsandro signed a contract with China League One club Shijiazhuang Gongfu. He made his league debut on 31 August 2022 in a 0–1 home lose against Qingdao Hainiu.

=== PSBS Biak ===
In August 2023, Alexsandro signed a contract with Indonesian club PSBS Biak. He said he joined PSBS because of his family's call, David da Rocha who had played with Persipura Jayapura in the Liga Indonesia made him called to start his career in Indonesia by joining the squad. Alexsandro made his league debut against Persewar Waropen on 11 September 2023, scored his first goal for the club with scored a brace in a 3–0 win. He was also shown a red card in the match in the 82nd minute. On 23 November 2023, Alexsandro scored hat-trick in a 2–6 away win against Persiba Balikpapan at Batakan Stadium.

Alexsandro scored two decisive goals for PSBS Biak to help them beat Persiraja Banda Aceh 4–0 to win promotion to Liga 1. He managed to win two individual awards in the league at once, "Top Scorer" with 19 goals and became "Best Player" as well.

== Honours ==
PSBS Biak

- Liga 2: 2023–24

Individual

- Liga 2 Top Goalscorer: 2023–24
- Liga 2 Best Player: 2023–24
- Liga 2 Team of the Season: 2023–24
