= Hariyanto Panto =

Indonesian association football player

Personal information
- Full name: Hariyanto Panto
- Date of birth: 4 November 1998 (age 28)
- Place of birth: Kendari, Indonesia
- Height: 1.64 m (5 ft 5 in)
- Positions: Left winger; attacking midfielder

Youth career
- 2016: PON Gorontalo

Senior career*
Years	Team	Apps	(Gls)
2017	Kalteng Putra	0	(0)
2018–2019	Persidago Gorontalo		
2019–2021	Badak Lampung	22	(4)
2021–2022	Persik Kediri	12	(0)
2022–2024	Sulut United	23	(3)
2024	Persiku Kudus	7	(0)
- * Club domestic league appearances and goals as of 8 December 2024

Hariyanto Panto (born 4 November 1998), is an Indonesian professional footballer who plays as a left winger or attacking midfielder.

== Club career ==
=== Badak Lampung ===
He was signed for Badak Lampung to play in Liga 1 in the 2019 season. Panto made his debut on 30 June 2019 in a match against Bali United. On 16 August 2019, Panto scored his first goal for Badak Lampung against Bhayangkara in the 69th minute at the Patriot Candrabaga Stadium, Bekasi.

=== Persik Kediri ===
In 2021, Hariyanto Panto signed a contract with Indonesian Liga 1 club Persik Kediri. He made his league debut on 27 August 2021, in a 1–0 loss against Bali United as substitute at the Gelora Bung Karno Stadium, Jakarta.

== Career statistics ==
=== Club ===
As of match played 8 December 2024

Club	Season	League			Cup (Note: Includes Piala Indonesia.)		Continental		Other		Total	
Club	Season	Division	Apps	Goals	Apps	Goals	Apps	Goals	Apps	Goals	Apps	Goals
Kalteng Putra	2017	Liga 2	0	0	0	0	-	-	0	0	0	0
Persidago Gorontalo	2018	Liga 3	—		1	0	-	-	0	0	1	0
Persidago Gorontalo	2019	Liga 3	—		4	2	-	-	0	0	4	2
Badak Lampung	2019	Liga 1	22	4	0	0	-	-	0	0	22	4
Badak Lampung	2020–21	Liga 2	1	0	0	0	-	-	0	0	1	0
Persik Kediri	2021	Liga 1	12	0	0	0	-	-	4 (Note: Appearances in Menpora Cup.)	0	16	0
Sulut United	2022–23	Liga 2	5	0	0	0	–		0	0	5	0
Sulut United	2023–24	Liga 2	18	3	0	0	–		0	0	18	3
Persiku Kudus	2024–25	Liga 2	7	0	0	0	–		0	0	7	0
Career total			65	7	5	2	0	0	4	0	74	9
