= Mofu (surname) =

Mofu is a surname. Notable people with the surname include:

- Vendry Mofu (born 1989), Indonesian footballer
- Irvan Mofu (born 1992), Indonesian footballer

== See also ==
- Mofu
