= Taufik Rustam =

Indonesian footballer (born 2005)

Personal information
- Full name: Taufik Rustam
- Date of birth: 21 February 2005 (age 21)
- Place of birth: Ternate, Indonesia
- Height: 1.65 m (5 ft 5 in)
- Positions: Right winger; attacking midfielder

Team information
- Current team: Java United
- Number: 19

Youth career
- Persiter Ternate
- Persija Jakarta U20

Senior career*
Years	Team	Apps	(Gls)
2023–2024	Sada Sumut	7	(1)
2024–2025	Bekasi City	4	(0)
2025–	Java United	23	(1)

International career^{‡}
2024	Indonesia U20	3	(0)
- * Club domestic league appearances and goals as of 19 September 2026 ‡ National team caps and goals as of 14 June 2024

Taufik Rustam (born 21 February 2005) is an Indonesian professional footballer who plays as a right winger or attacking midfielder for Super League club Java United.

== Club career ==
Born in Ternate, Rustam started his youth football career with local academy Persiter Ternate before joining the Persija Jakarta youth system. Prior to his professional top-flight, he joined second-tier side Sada Sumut in November 2023. On 25 November 2023, Rustam made his professional debut for the team, playing as a starter in a 2–2 over Persiraja Banda Aceh. On 2 February 2024, he netted his first goal for the club in a 1–5 home defeat against PSKC Cimahi.

Ahead of 2024–25 season, he signed a contract with another Liga 2 club Bekasi City. On 8 September 2024, he made his debut for the club, as a starter, in a 2–1 loss against Persikota Tangerang in the opening round of the Liga 2.

=== Malut United/Java United ===
In July 2025, Rustam returned to his hometown and signed a professional contract with the newly promoted Super League side Malut United (now called Java United) ahead of the 2025–26 season. He made his professional debut on 30 August 2025 in a home match against PSIM Yogyakarta at the Gelora Kie Raha Stadium, playing the entire first half before being substituted.

On 31 December 2025, Rustam scored his first professional goal, which served as a match-winning goal for Malut United. Throughout his debut season, he established himself as a prominent young talent under the U22 player regulations, recording 21 league appearances and contributing one goal.

== International career ==
In 2024, Rustam represented the Indonesia U20. He made his international debut for youth national team on 25 March 2024, playing as a substituted in a friendly match against China U20.

Rustam was called by coach Indra Sjafri to the Indonesia U20 team to participate at the 2024 Maurice Revello Tournament.

In July 2026, his impressive performances with Java United caught the attention of Indonesia national team manager John Herdman, earning him a call-up to Indonesia's 50-player preliminary squad training camp in Bali for the 2026 ASEAN Championship.

== Style of play ==
While training under Coach Hendri Susilo at Malut United, he always earned the team's trust—even during the preseason. He possesses great speed and power, and he's fearless when facing any opponent.

Rustam is capable of playing in five different positions, though all of them tend to be on the offensive side of the field—ranging from central midfielder, attacking midfielder, right winger and left winger, to striker.

== Career statistics ==
=== Club ===
As of 19 September 2026

Club	Season	League			Cup		Other		Total	
Club	Season	Division	Apps	Goals	Apps	Goals	Apps	Goals	Apps	Goals
Sada Sumut	2023–24	Liga 2	7	1	0	0	0	0	7	1
Sada Sumut	Total		7	1	0	0	0	0	7	1
Bekasi City	2024–25	Liga 2	4	0	0	0	0	0	4	0
Bekasi City	Total		4	0	0	0	0	0	4	0
Malut United	2025–26	Super League	21	1	0	0	0	0	21	1
Malut United	Total		21	1	0	0	0	0	21	1
Java United	2026–27	Super League	2	0	0	0	0	0	2	0
Java United	Total		2	0	0	0	0	0	2	0
Career total			34	2	0	0	0	0	34	2
