= Marco Kabiay =

Indonesian association footballer

Personal information
- Full name: Marco Markus Kabiay
- Date of birth: 17 February 1991 (age 35)
- Place of birth: Jayapura, Indonesia
- Height: 1.67 m (5 ft 6 in)
- Position: Full-back

Youth career
- 2007–2010: Persipura Jayapura

Senior career*
Years	Team	Apps	(Gls)
2008–2012	Persipura Jayapura	31	(1)
2012–2015	Persiram Raja Ampat	42	(0)
2016–2017	Cacusan CF	14	(0)
2017	PSBS Biak	5	(0)
2017	Arema	6	(1)
2018	Persija Jakarta	1	(0)
2018	PSMS Medan	2	(0)
2019	Persewar Waropen	10	(0)
2019	Semen Padang	2	(0)
2020	Persis Solo	0	(0)
Total		113	(2)

International career
2013	Indonesia U23	1	(0)
- * Club domestic league appearances and goals

Marco Markus Kabiay (born 17 February 1991) is an Indonesian former footballer who played as a full-back.

== Club career ==
=== Cacusan CF ===
In February 2016, Marco joined Cacusan CF in the 2016 Liga Futebol Amadora. He was contracted for one year along with his friends from Persipura Jayapura, Moses Banggo and Elvis Harewan.

=== Arema FC ===
In August 2017, Marco joined Arema, he was contracted for half season. and he made his debut against Mitra Kukar in the 24th week 2017 Liga 1.

== Honours ==
=== Club honors ===
Persipura Jayapura

- Indonesia Super League: 2010–11
- Indonesian Inter Island Cup: 2011

Persija Jakarta

- Indonesia President's Cup: 2018
