= Fatjon Celani =

German footballer (born 1992)

Personal information
- Date of birth: 14 January 1992 (age 34)
- Place of birth: Munich, Germany
- Height: 1.82 m (6 ft 0 in)
- Position: Forward

Team information
- Current team: Türkgücü München
- Number: 11

Youth career
- –2009: SC Fürstenfeldbruck
- 2009–2011: Wacker Burghausen

Senior career*
Years	Team	Apps	(Gls)
2010–2012	Wacker Burghausen II	33	(19)
2011–2012	Wacker Burghausen	2	(0)
2012–2013	FC Augsburg II	10	(1)
2013–2014	FC Unterföhring	19	(8)
2015	VfR Mannheim	14	(9)
2015–2016	TuS Koblenz	28	(19)
2016–2017	TSG Neustrelitz	30	(5)
2017–2018	TSV Steinbach	23	(2)
2018–2021	FC Memmingen	42	(12)
2021–2022	Etzella Ettelbruck	28	(10)
2022–2023	Politehnica Timișoara	3	(0)
2023	Malisheva	6	(0)
2023–2024	Perserang Serang	16	(6)
2024	TSV Buchbach	14	(1)
2025–	Türkgücü München	21	(6)
- * Club domestic league appearances and goals as of 14:38, 7 October 2025 (UTC)

Fatjon Celani (born 14 January 1992) is a German professional footballer who plays as a forward for Bayernliga club Türkgücü München.

== Club career ==
In September 2023, Fatjon officially signed a contract with Indonesian club Perserang Serang. He made his debut match with Perserang in an away match against Malut United on 18 September 2023 at PTIK Stadium in the 2023–24 Liga 2 season. In that match, he managed to score two goals for his team, but it ended with Perserang losing 2–3 to his opponent.

On 31 December 2024, Celani joined Türkgücü München.
