= Adittia Gigis =

Indonesian footballer

Personal information
- Full name: Adittia Gigis Hermawan
- Date of birth: 22 May 1999 (age 27)
- Place of birth: Bogor, Indonesia
- Height: 1.81 m (5 ft 11 in)
- Position: Midfielder

Team information
- Current team: Garudayaksa
- Number: 21

Senior career*
Years	Team	Apps	(Gls)
2016–2017	Persikad Depok	4	(0)
2018–2022	Persita Tangerang	48	(2)
2022–2023	Bekasi City	0	(0)
2023–2025	Borneo Samarinda	0	(0)
2023–2024	→ Bekasi City (loan)	15	(0)
2024–2025	→ PSIM Yogyakarta (loan)	22	(0)
2025–	Garudayaksa	25	(3)
- * Club domestic league appearances and goals as of 9 May 2026

Adittia Gigis Hermawan (born 22 May 1999) is an Indonesian professional footballer who plays as a midfielder for Super League club Garudayaksa.

== Club career ==
=== Persita Tangerang ===
He was signed for Persita Tangerang to play in Liga 2 in the 2018 season.

== Career statistics ==
=== Club ===
As of 9 May 2026

Club	Season	League			Cup (Note: Includes Piala Indonesia)		Other		Total	
Club	Season	Division	Apps	Goals	Apps	Goals	Apps	Goals	Apps	Goals
Persikad Depok	2016	ISC B	2	0	0	0	0	0	2	0
Persikad Depok	2017	Liga 2	2	0	0	0	0	0	2	0
Persikad Depok	Total		4	0	0	0	0	0	4	0
Persita Tangerang	2018	Liga 2	23	1	0	0	0	0	23	1
Persita Tangerang	2019	Liga 2	21	1	0	0	0	0	21	1
Persita Tangerang	2020	Liga 1	2	0	0	0	0	0	2	0
Persita Tangerang	2021–22	Liga 1	2	0	0	0	2 (Note: Appearances in Menpora Cup)	0	4	0
Persita Tangerang	2022–23	Liga 1	0	0	0	0	0	0	0	0
Persita Tangerang	Total		48	2	0	0	2	0	50	2
Bekasi City	2022–23	Liga 2	0	0	0	0	0	0	0	0
Borneo Samarinda	2023–24	Liga 1	0	0	0	0	0	0	0	0
Bekasi City (loan)	2023–24	Liga 2	15	0	0	0	0	0	15	0
PSIM Yogyakarta (loan)	2024–25	Liga 2	22	0	0	0	0	0	22	0
Garudayaksa	2025–26	Championship	25	3	0	0	0	0	25	3
Career total			114	4	0	0	2	0	116	4

== Honours ==
Persita Tangerang

- Liga 2 runner-up: 2019

PSIM Yogyakarta

- Liga 2: 2024–25

Garudayaksa

- Championship: 2025–26
