= Derrick Sasraku =

Ghanaian footballer

Personal information
- Full name: Derrick Sasraku
- Date of birth: 12 April 1994 (age 32)
- Place of birth: Accra, Ghana
- Height: 1.87 m (6 ft 1 1/2 in)
- Position: Forward

Team information
- Current team: Naft Al-Wasat

Senior career*
Years	Team	Apps	(Gls)
2016–2018	Aduana Stars	0	(0)
2018–2020	Club Africain	11	(0)
2020	Medeama		
2020–2021	Tirana	10	(1)
2021	Saham Club		
2022–2023	Muscat Club		
2023	Malut United	5	(0)
2023–2026	Al-Shomooa	8	(2)
2026	Al Dhahra	9	(4)
2026–	Naft Al-Wasat	0	(0)
- * Club domestic league appearances and goals as of 23 April 2026

Derrick Sasraku (born 12 April 1994) is a Ghanaian professional footballer who plays as a forward for Iraqi club Naft Al-Wasat.

== Club career ==
=== Saham Club ===
Derrick joined for Oman Professional League club Saham Club in 2021–22 season.

=== Malut United ===
In September 2023, Derrick joined the Indonesian Liga 2 club Malut United to fill the Foreign Player 1 slot in the 2023–24 season.
