= Sylvain Atieda =

French footballer (born 1996)

Personal information
- Full name: Sylvain Justin Atieda
- Date of birth: 29 February 1996 (age 30)
- Place of birth: Saint-Laurent-du-Maroni, French Guiana
- Height: 1.83 m (6 ft 0 in)
- Position: Forward

Team information
- Current team: Rodange 91
- Number: 17

Youth career
- Roubaix SC

Senior career*
Years	Team	Apps	(Gls)
2019	Pays Blanc Antoinien	0	(0)
2019–2021	KSCT Menen	23	(4)
2021–2022	RFC Tournai	21	(6)
2022–2023	FC Péruwelz	23	(8)
2024–2025	Rodange 91	40	(27)
2025–2026	Persik Kediri	5	(0)
2026	→ Persekat Tegal (loan)	9	(3)
2026–	Rodange 91	1	(0)
- * Club domestic league appearances and goals as of 16 August 2026

Sylvain Justin Atieda (born 29 February 1996) is a French professional footballer who plays as a forward for Luxembourg Division of Honour club Rodange 91.

== Club career ==
Born in Saint-Laurent-du-Maroni, French Guiana, Atieda has French nationality and spent his early career in France at a young age with Roubaix SC and abroad for the first time to Belgium where he played for Pays Blanc Antoinien, KSCT Menen, Tournai, and Péruwelz.

=== Rodange 91 ===
After playing with several Belgian clubs, he signed a contract with Luxembourg BGL League club Rodange 91 in June 2024. Atieda made his league debut on 3 August 2024 as a starter in a 1–1 draw over Racing Union. On 18 August 2024, he scored his first league goal for Rodange with score a brace, as they drew 3–1 win against Fola Esch. On 9 February 2025, Atieda scored another brace for the club in 2–2 draw against UNA Strassen. He contributed with 27 goals and 9 assists in 42 matches in all competitions.

=== Persik Kediri ===
On 8 July 2025, Atieda decide moved to Asia, signed a contract with Indonesian Super League club Persik Kediri.
