= Jacob Youmbi =

Central African footballer

Jacob Youmbi E'pandi
Personal information
- Full name: Jacob Nicanor Youmbi E'pandi
- Date of birth: 1 April 1994 (age 32)
- Place of birth: Cameroon
- Position: Defensive midfielder

Team information
- Current team: Botafogo FC (Douala)

Senior career*
Years	Team	Apps	(Gls)
2013–2014	New Star de Douala		
2015	Leones Vegetarianos		
2015–2018	Ben Guerdane	35	(1)
2018–2020	Naft Al-Junoob		
2020–2021	Al-Kahrabaa		
2021–2023	Naft Al-Basra		
2023–2024	Persipa Pati	17	(1)
2024–	Botafogo FC (Douala)		

International career^{‡}
2022–	Central African Republic	5	(0)
- * Club domestic league appearances and goals as of 6 February 2024 ‡ National team caps and goals as of 1 June 2022

Jacob Nicanor Youmbi E'pandi (born 1 April 1994), or simply Jacob Youmbi, is a Central African professional footballer who plays as a defensive midfielder for Botafogo FC (Douala) and the Central African Republic national team.

== Club career ==
=== Leones Vegetarianos ===
Youmbi played for Equatorial Guinean club Leones Vegetarianos at the 2015 CAF Confederation Cup qualifying rounds.

=== Naft Al-Junoob ===
In 2018, Jacob played for Iraqi Premier League club Naft Al-Junoob.

=== Persipa Pati ===
In September 2023, Jacob joined Liga 2 club Persipa Pati for 2023–24 season.

== Honours ==
Ben Guerdane

- Tunisian Cup runner-up: 2017
