= Januar Eka Ramadhan =

Indonesian footballer

Januar Eka
Personal information
- Full name: Januar Eka Ramadhan
- Date of birth: 13 January 1995 (age 31)
- Place of birth: Cilegon, Indonesia
- Height: 1.80 m (5 ft 11 in)
- Position: Forward

Senior career*
Years	Team	Apps	(Gls)
2019	Persipan Pandeglang		
2020	Cilegon United	0	(0)
2021	Badak Lampung	7	(3)
2022–2023	Persebaya Surabaya	15	(1)
2023–2024	Deltras	13	(1)
2026	Adhyaksa	0	(0)
- * Club domestic league appearances and goals as of 6 February 2024

Januar Eka Ramadhan (born 13 January 1995) is an Indonesian professional footballer who plays as a forward.

== Club career ==
=== Badak Lampung ===
Januar became Badak Lampung's in the 2021–22 Liga 2. Januar made his debut on 4 October 2021 in a match against PSKC Cimahi at the Gelora Bung Karno Madya Stadium, Jakarta. On 29 October, Januar scored his first league goal for Badak Lampung with scored a brace in a 4–1 win over Perserang Serang. On 8 November, he scored in a 3–2 lose over PSKC Cimahi. Until the competition ended, he appeared in 7 matches, and scored 3 goals.

=== Persebaya Surabaya ===
He was signed for Persebaya Surabaya and played in Liga 1 in 2022-2023 season. Januar made his league debut on 25 July 2022 in a match against Persikabo 1973 as a substitute for Ahmad Nufiandani in the 80th minute at the Pakansari Stadium, Cibinong.

He scored his first league goal for the side on 13 February 2023 in a 4–2 win with PSS Sleman.

== Honours ==
=== Individual ===
- Liga 2 Best goal: 2023–24
