= Mojtaba Lotfi =

Iranian footballer

Personal information
- Full name: Mojtaba Lotfi Jalise
- Date of birth: 18 March 1989 (age 37)
- Place of birth: Karaj, Iran
- Height: 1.86 m (6 ft 1 in)
- Position: Centre-back

Team information
- Current team: Nassaji Mazandaran
- Number: 18

Senior career*
Years	Team	Apps	(Gls)
2015	Shahin Kish		
2015–2016	Gol Reyhan Alborz		
2016–2019	Pars Jonoubi Jam	75	(1)
2019	Saipa	10	(0)
2020	Shahin Bushehr	9	(0)
2021	Saipa	8	(0)
2022	Naft Masjed Soleyman	15	(0)
2022	Esteghlal Khuzestan	9	(1)
2023	Kheybar Khorramabad	26	(0)
2023–2024	Persijap Jepara	16	(0)
2024	Havadar	5	(0)
2024–2025	Sanat Naft	29	(0)
2025–	Nassaji Mazandaran	3	(0)
- * Club domestic league appearances and goals as of 7 December 2025

Mojtaba Lotfi Jalise (Persian: مجتبی لطفی جليسه; born 18 March 1989) is an Iranian professional footballer who plays as a centre-back for Azadegan League club Nassaji Mazandaran.

== Club career ==
=== Persijap Jepara ===
Lotfi joined Persijap Jepara to play in Liga 2 in the 2023–24 season.
