= Jose Wilkson =

Brazilian footballer (born 1992)

Personal information
- Full name: Jose Wilkson Teixeira Rocha
- Date of birth: 22 March 1992 (age 34)
- Place of birth: Fortaleza, Brazil
- Height: 1.90 m (6 ft 3 in)
- Position: Forward

Team information
- Current team: Victoria Wanderers
- Number: 16

Senior career*
Years	Team	Apps	(Gls)
2017	Tiradentes	4	(2)
2017–2018	Caucaia	1	(0)
2018	Maranguape	4	(1)
2018	União Beltrão	4	(0)
2018	Carapebus	18	(8)
2019	União Beltrão	9	(3)
2019–2020	Senglea Athletic	19	(7)
2020–2021	Hibernians	21	(2)
2021–2022	Persebaya Surabaya	13	(6)
2022	→ Persela Lamongan (loan)	13	(4)
2023	Itapipoca	11	(8)
2023	Caucaia	3	(3)
2023	Gżira United	6	(0)
2023–2024	Malut United	16	(9)
2024	Maziya	3	(0)
2024–2025	Gresik United	10	(5)
2025–	Victoria Wanderers	6	(3)
- * Club domestic league appearances and goals as of 25 October 2025

Jose Wilkson Teixeira Rocha (born 22 March 1992) is a Brazilian professional footballer who plays as a forward for Maltese club Victoria Wanderers.

== Honours ==
Malut United

- Liga 2 third place (play-offs): 2023–24
