= Ruben Sanadi =

Indonesian footballer

Personal information
- Full name: Ruben Karel Sanadi
- Date of birth: 8 January 1987 (age 39)
- Place of birth: Biak, Indonesia
- Height: 1.70 m (5 ft 7 in)
- Position: Left back

Team information
- Current team: Persipura Jayapura
- Number: 14

Senior career*
Years	Team	Apps	(Gls)
2006–2007	Persigubin Bintang Mountains		
2007–2008	Persikota Tangerang	16	(1)
2008–2009	PSMS Medan	18	(2)
2009–2010	Persipasi Bekasi	10	(0)
2010–2012	Pelita Jaya	51	(0)
2013–2017	Persipura Jayapura	93	(2)
2018–2019	Persebaya Surabaya	58	(1)
2020–2023	Bhayangkara	48	(0)
2023–2024	PSBS Biak	20	(0)
2024–2025	Bhayangkara	15	(0)
2025–	Persipura Jayapura	25	(0)

International career
2009	Indonesia U23	3	(0)
2013–2019	Indonesia	11	(0)
- * Club domestic league appearances and goals as of 18 September 2026

Ruben Karel Sanadi (born on 8 January 1987 in Biak, Indonesia) is an Indonesian professional footballer who plays as a left back for Liga 2 club Persipura Jayapura.

== Career statistics ==
=== International ===
As of match played 10 September 2019

Appearances and goals by national team and year
National team	Year	Apps	Goals
Indonesia	2013	6	0
Indonesia	2014	1	0
Indonesia	2019	4	0
Indonesia	Total	11	0

== Honours ==
=== Club ===
Persipura Jayapura

- Indonesia Super League: 2013
- Indonesia Soccer Championship A: 2016

Persebaya Surabaya

- Indonesia President's Cup runner-up: 2019

PSBS Biak

- Liga 2: 2023–24

Bhayangkara

- Liga 2 runner-up: 2024–25

=== Individual ===
- Liga 1 Team of the Season: 2019
- Liga 2 Team of the Season: 2023–24
- Liga 2 Best assist: 2023–24
