= Elvis Harewan =

Indonesian association footballer

Elvis Nuh Harewan
Personal information
- Full name: Elvis Nuh Harewan
- Date of birth: 15 June 1990 (age 36)
- Place of birth: Yapen, Indonesia
- Height: 1.65 m (5 ft 5 in)
- Position: Midfielder

Senior career*
| Years | Team | Apps | (Gls) |
| 2008–2012 | Persipura Jayapura | 35 | (2) |
| 2013–2015 | Persiram Raja Ampat | 37 | (0) |
| 2016–2017 | Cacusan CF | 17 | (3) |
| 2017 | Semen Padang | 1 | (0) |
| 2017 | Perseka Kaimana | 1 | (0) |
| 2018 | PSBS Biak | 1 | (0) |
| 2019–2024 | Persewar Waropen | 45 | (1) |
| 2024–2025 | Persipura Jayapura | 16 | (0) |
- * Club domestic league appearances and goals as of 23:35, 6 October 2025 (UTC)

Elvis Nuh Harewan (born 15 June 1990) is an Indonesian professional footballer who plays as a midfielder.

== Club career ==
=== Cacusan CF ===
In February 2016, Elvis joined Cacusan CF in the 2016 Liga Futebol Amadora, he was contracted for one year with his friend while still in Persipura Jayapura, Moses Banggo and Marco Kabiay.
