= Ali Koroy =

Indonesian footballer (born 2001)

Personal information
- Full name: Muhammad Ali Koroy
- Date of birth: 18 September 2001 (age 25)
- Place of birth: Sanana, Indonesia
- Height: 1.68 m (5 ft 6 in)
- Positions: Winger; forward

Youth career
- 2019: PPLP Maluku Utara

Senior career*
Years	Team	Apps	(Gls)
2021	Persipa Pati	12	(6)
2022–2023	Persikabo 1973	7	(0)
2023–2024	Sriwijaya	14	(2)
2024–2025	Persipa Pati	14	(0)
2024	→ Bhayangkara (loan)	2	(0)
- * Club domestic league appearances and goals as of 18 February 2025

Muhammad Ali Koroy (born 18 September 2001) is an Indonesian professional footballer who plays as a winger or forward.

== Club career ==
=== Persipa Pati ===
On 2021, Ali Koroy signed a one-year contract with Liga 3 club Persipa Pati. He made 12 league appearances and scored 6 goals for Persipa Pati in the 2021 Liga 3.

=== Persikabo 1973 ===
He was signed for Persikabo 1973 to play in Liga 1 in the 2022 season. Koroy made his league debut on 27 August 2022 in a match against Madura United at the Gelora Bangkalan Stadium, Bangkalan.

=== Sriwijaya ===
In August 2023, he was signed for Sriwijaya to play in Liga 2 in the 2023–24 season. Koroy made his league debut on 25 September 2023 in a match against PSDS Deli Serdang at the Baharuddin Siregar Stadium, Deli Serdang, also scored his first league goal for the team in a 2–2 draw.

== Career statistics ==
=== Club ===
As of 18 February 2025.

Club	Season	League			Cup		Continental		Other		Total	
Club	Season	Division	Apps	Goals	Apps	Goals	Apps	Goals	Apps	Goals	Apps	Goals
Persipa Pati	2021–22	Liga 3	12	6	0	0	0	0	0	0	12	6
Persikabo 1973	2022–23	Liga 1	7	0	0	0	0	0	0	0	7	0
Sriwijaya	2023–24	Liga 2	14	2	0	0	0	0	0	0	14	2
Persipa Pati	2024–25	Liga 2	14	0	0	0	0	0	0	0	14	0
Bhayangkara	2024–25	Liga 2	2	0	0	0	0	0	0	0	2	0
Career total			49	8	0	0	0	0	0	0	49	8

== Honours ==
=== Club ===
Persipa Pati

- Liga 3 Central Java: 2021

Bhayangkara

- Liga 2 runner-up: 2024–25
