= Surya Maulana =

Indonesian footballer (born 2001)

Personal information
- Full name: Muhammad Surya Maulana
- Date of birth: 9 July 2001 (age 25)
- Place of birth: Surabaya, Indonesia
- Height: 1.81 m (5 ft 11 in)
- Positions: Centre-back; right-back

Team information
- Current team: Persekat Tegal
- Number: 15

Youth career
- 2016: Persesa Sampang
- 2018: Persekap Pasuruan
- 2018–2020: Bhayangkara

Senior career*
Years	Team	Apps	(Gls)
2021–2025	Bhayangkara	15	(0)
2024–2025	→ Persekat Tegal (loan)	9	(0)
2025–	Persekat Tegal	22	(0)
- * Club domestic league appearances and goals as of 8 May 2026

Muhammad Surya Maulana (born 9 July 2001) is an Indonesian professional footballer who plays as a defender for Liga 2 club Persekat Tegal.

== Club career ==
=== Bhayangkara ===
He was signed for Bhayangkara to play in Liga 1 in the 2021 season. Surya made his professional debut on 6 December 2021 in a match against Persela Lamongan at the Maguwoharjo Stadium, Sleman.

== Career statistics ==
=== Club ===
As of 8 May 2026.

Club	Season	League		Cup		Continental		Other		Total	
Club	Season	Apps	Goals	Apps	Goals	Apps	Goals	Apps	Goals	Apps	Goals
Bhayangkara	2021–22	1	0	0	0	–		0	0	1	0
Bhayangkara	2022–23	0	0	0	0	–		0	0	0	0
Bhayangkara	2023–24	14	0	0	0	–		0	0	14	0
Bhayangkara	2024–25	0	0	0	0	–		0	0	0	0
Persekat Tegal (loan)	2024–25	9	0	0	0	–		0	0	9	0
Persekat Tegal	2025–26	22	0	0	0	–		0	0	22	0
Career total		46	0	0	0	0	0	0	0	46	0
