= Riski Fajar Saputra =

Indonesian footballer

Riski Fajar
Personal information
- Full name: Riski Fajar Saputra
- Date of birth: 27 January 2000 (age 26)
- Place of birth: Depok, Indonesia
- Height: 1.71 m (5 ft 7 in)
- Position: Winger

Team information
- Current team: Bekasi City
- Number: 27

Youth career
- 2014: SSB Kabomania Cibinong
- 2014: SKF
- 2016: Persab Brebes
- 2015–2018: Diklat Ragunan
- 2018: Sriwijaya U19
- 2019: PSIS U20

Senior career*
Years	Team	Apps	(Gls)
2021–2022	PSIS Semarang	4	(0)
2022	Persekat Tegal	7	(0)
2023–2024	Perserang Serang	12	(3)
2024–	Bekasi City	8	(0)
- * Club domestic league appearances and goals as of 15 December 2024

Riski Fajar Saputra (born 27 January 2000) is an Indonesian professional footballer who plays as a winger for Liga 2 club Bekasi City.

== Club career ==
=== PSIS Semarang ===
He was signed for PSIS Semarang to play in Liga 1 in the 2021 season. Riski made his professional debut on 10 February 2022 in a match against Barito Putera at the Kapten I Wayan Dipta Stadium, Gianyar.

== Career statistics ==
=== Club ===
As of 30 January 2025

Club	Season	League			Cup		Other		Total	
Club	Season	Division	Apps	Goals	Apps	Goals	Apps	Goals	Apps	Goals
PSIS Semarang	2021–22	Liga 1	4	0	0	0	3 (Note: Appearances in Menpora Cup)	0	7	0
Persekat Tegal	2022–23	Liga 2	7	0	0	0	0	0	7	0
Perserang Serang	2023–24	Liga 2	12	3	0	0	0	0	12	3
Bekasi City	2024–25	Liga 2	8	0	0	0	0	0	8	0
Career total			31	3	0	0	3	0	34	3
