= Rossy Noprihanis =

Indonesian association footballer

Personal information
- Full name: Rossy Noprihanis
- Date of birth: 28 November 1990 (age 35)
- Place of birth: Narmada, West Lombok, Indonesia
- Height: 1.67 m (5 ft 6 in)
- Positions: Right winger; attacking midfielder

Team information
- Current team: Gresik United
- Number: 7

Youth career
- 2008–2010: Pelita Jaya

Senior career*
Years	Team	Apps	(Gls)
2010–2011	KSB West Sumbawa	19	(1)
2012–2015	Persepam Madura Utama	45	(10)
2016	Madura United	9	(0)
2017	PSS Sleman	16	(3)
2018	Persiba Balikpapan	17	(10)
2018	PSS Sleman	4	(0)
2019	PSIM Yogyakarta	16	(2)
2020–2024	Sulut United	34	(10)
2024–	Gresik United	13	(0)
- * Club domestic league appearances and goals as of 20:27, 13 February 2025 (UTC)

Rossy Noprihanis (born 28 November 1990) is an Indonesian professional footballer who plays as a right winger or attacking midfielder for Liga 2 club Gresik United.

== Club career ==
=== Persepam Madura Utama ===
He scored a hat-trick against Persiba Balikpapan on July 7, 2013.

=== PSIM Yogyakarta ===
In 2019, Noprihanis signed a contract with Indonesian Liga 2 club PSIM Yogyakarta. He made 16 league appearances and scored 2 goals for PSIM Yogyakarta.

=== Sulut United ===
He was signed for Sulut United to play in Liga 2 in the 2020 season. This season was suspended on 27 March 2020 due to the COVID-19 pandemic. The season was abandoned and was declared void on 20 January 2021.

== Honours ==
=== Club ===
Pelita Jaya U-21

- Indonesia Super League U-21 runner-up: 2009-10

PSS Sleman

- Liga 2: 2018
