= Geril Kapoh =

Indonesian footballer

Personal information
- Full name: Rafly Gabriel Hosea Kapoh
- Date of birth: 31 December 2001 (age 24)
- Place of birth: Tomohon, Indonesia
- Height: 1.83 m (6 ft 0 in)
- Position: Goalkeeper

Youth career
- 2015–2017: PSKT Tomohon
- 2018: PS Manguni
- 2019: Persitaro Sitaro

Senior career*
Years	Team	Apps	(Gls)
2020–2024	Sulut United	11	(0)
2021–2022	→ Belitong (loan)	0	(0)
2023	→ Persik Kediri (loan)	0	(0)
2024–2025	Persik Kediri	0	(0)
2025–2026	Persipura Jayapura	1	(0)
- * Club domestic league appearances and goals as of 28 September 2025 (UTC)

Rafly Gabriel Hosea Kapoh (born 31 December 2001), or simply Geril Kapoh, is an Indonesian professional footballer who plays as a goalkeeper.

== Club career ==
=== Sulut United ===
At the age of 18, Kapoh joined Sulut United this season. Lack of experience and flying hours made him plotted as the fourth goalkeeper at Sulut United. This season was suspended on 27 March 2020 due to the COVID-19 pandemic. The season was abandoned and was declared void on 20 January 2021.

==== Belitong (loan) ====
In September 2021, Kapoh joined Liga 3 club Belitong as a loan from Sulut United.

=== Return to Sulut United ===
Ahead of 2022–23 season, He was never getting playing minutes made him return to Sulut United after being loaned out by Liga 3 club Belitong. And finally he made his league debut for Sulut United in a 0–1 away lose against Persipal BU on 4 September 2022. On 1 October 2022, he kept his first clean sheet in a 1–0 victory over PSBS Biak.

==== Persik Kediri (loan) ====
On 31 January 2023, Kapoh was signed for Persik Kediri alongside Braif Fatari to play in the second round of 2022–23 Liga 1. He was with Persik Kediri for only four months, during his season with Persik Kediri, Kapoh has not yet recorded playing minutes.
