= Rosad Setiawan =

Indonesian footballer

Personal information
- Full name: Rosad Setiawan
- Date of birth: 9 August 1996 (age 30)
- Place of birth: Lubuk Basung, Indonesia
- Height: 1.72 m (5 ft 8 in)
- Position: Defensive midfielder

Team information
- Current team: RANS Nusantara
- Number: 31

Senior career*
Years	Team	Apps	(Gls)
2012	PSP Padang	6	(0)
2013–2014	Perserang Serang	17	(0)
2015–2016	PSP Padang	0	(0)
2017	Persinga Ngawi	14	(2)
2017	Persibat Batang	3	(0)
2018–2026	Semen Padang	112	(7)
2026–	RANS Nusantara	0	(0)

International career
2013	Indonesia U19		
- * Club domestic league appearances and goals as of 23 May 2026

Rosad Setiawan (born 9 August 1996) is an Indonesian professional footballer who plays as a defensive midfielder for Championship club RANS Nusantara.

== Club career ==
=== Semen Padang ===
He was signed for Semen Padang to play in Liga 2 in the 2018 season.

== Honours ==
=== Clubs ===
Semen Padang

- Liga 2 runner-up: 2018, 2023–24

=== Individual ===
- Liga 2 Team of the Season: 2023–24
