= Kim Do-hyun =

South Korean footballer (born 1994)

Personal information
- Date of birth: 9 April 1994 (age 32)
- Place of birth: South Korea
- Height: 1.77 m (5 ft 10 in)
- Position: Midfielder

Team information
- Current team: Persela Lamongan
- Number: 22

Senior career*
| Years | Team | Apps | (Gls) |
- Goyang Citizen
| 2017 | Bežanija | | |
| 2017–2018 | Dugo Selo | | |
| 2018–2020 | Krka | 56 | (16) |
| 2020–2021 | Domžale | 12 | (0) |
| 2020–2021 | → Aluminij (loan) | 21 | (0) |
| 2021–2022 | Triglav Kranj | 43 | (0) |
| 2023 | Narva Trans | 17 | (0) |
| 2023–2024 | Persela Lamongan | 14 | (3) |
| 2024 | Persikota Tangerang | 10 | (2) |
| 2025– | Persela Lamongan | 7 | (0) |
- * Club domestic league appearances and goals as of 19 February 2025

Kim Do-hyun (Korean: 김도현; born 9 April 1994) is a South Korean professional footballer who plays as a midfielder for Indonesian club Persela Lamongan.

== Career ==
Kim attended Kyushu University in Japan, where he played college football. Unable to join a professional team in Japan, Kim returned to South Korea and played for the K3 League team Goyang Citizen. He then moved to Europe and played for lower league sides in Serbia and Croatia.

In February 2020, Kim signed for Domžale in the Slovenian top flight.
