= Hendri Susilo =

Indonesian association football coach

Personal information
- Full name: Hendri Susilo
- Date of birth: 11 December 1965 (age 60)
- Place of birth: Bukittinggi, Indonesia

Team information
- Current team: Barito Putera (head coach)

Managerial career
- Years: Team
- 2005–2007: Indonesia U18
- 2011–2012: Persisam Putra Samarinda
- 2015–2017: PS Sumbawa Barat
- 2018: PSPS Pekanbaru
- 2019–2021: Persiraja Banda Aceh
- 2021–2022: Semen Padang
- 2022–2023: PSBS Biak
- 2023–2024: Sriwijaya
- 2024: Semen Padang
- 2024–2025: Sriwijaya
- 2025–2026: Malut United
- 2026–: Barito Putera

Hendri Susilo (born 11 December 1965) is an Indonesian professional football coach who is the head coach of Championship club Barito Putera.

He holds an AFC Pro license. Susilo is the only Indonesian head coach in the top-tier Super League the 2025 season.

== Managerial career ==
Susilo began his managerial career leading the Indonesia national under-18 team at the AFC U-17 Asian Cup qualifiers from 2005 to 2007. He manage Persisam Putra Samarinda (2011–2012), before serving as assistant coach at Persija Jakarta and Sriwijaya.

He took charge of Persiraja Banda Aceh and successfully led them to promotion to Liga 1 in 2019. He achieved Liga 2 survival with Semen Padang in 2022 and Sriwijaya in 2024.

== Managerial style ==
He is known for his disciplined approach and implementation of a 4–3–3 defending formation, emphasizing teamwork and defensive stability.

== Managerial statistics ==
As of 8 August 2026

Managerial record by team and tenure
Team	Nat.	From	To	Record					Ref.
Team	Nat.	From	To	G	W	D	L	Win %	Ref.
Persiraja Banda Aceh	(Indonesia)	4 May 2019	27 October 2021	24	9	3	12	37.50	
Semen Padang	(Indonesia)	30 October 2021	1 January 2022	5	1	2	2	20.00	
PSCS Cilacap	(Indonesia)	8 June 2022	2 June 2023	7	2	4	1	28.57	
PSBS Biak	(Indonesia)	1 July 2023	4 November 2023	7	3	2	2	42.86	
Sriwijaya	(Indonesia)	15 November 2023	29 February 2024	10	6	3	1	60.00	
Semen Padang	(Indonesia)	25 March 2024	13 September 2024	4	1	0	3	25.00	
Sriwijaya	(Indonesia)	3 October 2024	31 March 2025	16	6	3	7	37.50	
Malut United	(Indonesia)	24 July 2025	30 June 2026	34	15	8	11	44.12	
Barito Putera	(Indonesia)	8 August 2026	Present	0	0	0	0	—	
Career Total				107	43	25	39	40.19	
