= Dwika Tjahja Setiawan =

Indonesian admiral

Rear Admiral Dwika Tjahja Setiawan
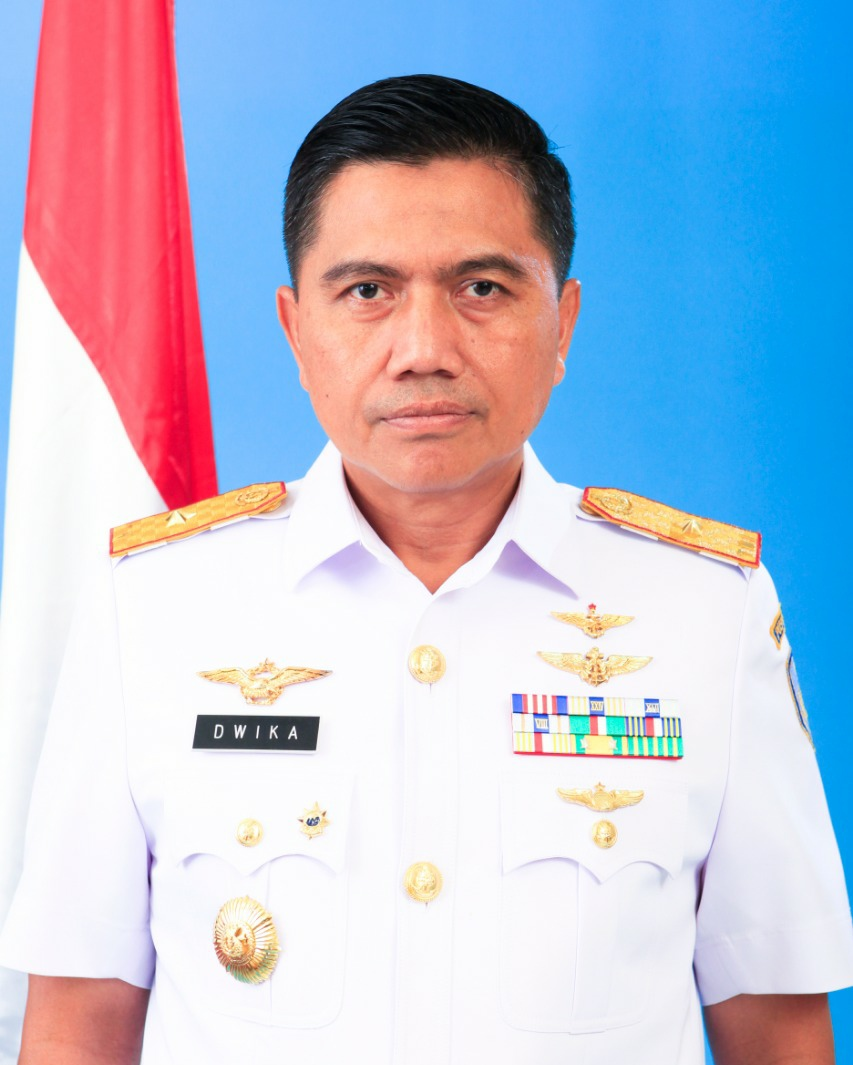
- Born: 24 September 1966 (age 60); Medan, North Sumatra, Indonesia
- Military career
- Allegiance: Indonesia
- Branch: Indonesian Navy
- Service years: 1990–present
- Rank: Rear Admiral
- Commands: Chief of Staff of Military Sealift Command
- Awards: See Awards

Rear Admiral Dwika Tjahja Setiawan (born 24 September 1966) is a commodore in the Indonesian Navy who served as its chief of staff (Indonesian: Kepala Staf Angkatan Laut, abbreviated KSAL or Kasal) in the navy's Military Sealift Command.

== Career ==
He graduated from the Indonesian Naval Academy in 1990 as a Navy pilot. As an aviator, he mostly served in the air wing and air bases at the Eastern Indonesian Fleet Command and the Indonesian Navy Aviation Center. Initially, after graduating as the first officer of the Navy with the rank of Second Lieutenant with the Marine Corps, he served on KRI Tanjung Oisina and KRI Mentawai. However, his career path changed to become a Navy pilot, after in 1994 he attended an aviation officer education.

After graduating from pilot school, since then most of his career has been spent in the Indonesian Navy's aviation environment, starting with the 400 Squadron of the Eastern Fleet Air Unit, Juanda Air Base, Air Wing I, Air Wing II and Puspenerbal.

== Awards ==
Bintang Yudha Dharma Nararya

Satyalancana Kesetiaan 24 years' service

Satyalancana Kesetiaan 16 years' service

Satyalancana Kesetiaan 8 years' service

Satyalancana Dharma Nusa

Satyalancana Wira Nusa

Satyalancana Wira Dharma

Satyalancana Dwidya Sistha (2 stars)

Satyalancana Kebhaktian Sosial

== Position ==
- Commander of the 400th Air Squadron
- Commander of the Indonesian Navy Aviation School
- Commander of the Lanal Pontianak
- Air Wing Commander II
- Air Wing Commander I (2014–2016)
- Deputy Commander of Lantamal IV/Tanjung Pinang (2016–2017)
- Commander of Puspenerbal (2017–2019)
- Senior Officer of the Chief of Expert Staff for the Field of Science and Technology (2019)
- Kaskolinlamil (2019–)

== See also ==
- Indonesian military ranks
