= Ruly Saputra =

Indonesian footballer

Personal information
- Full name: Ruly Saputra
- Date of birth: 18 April 1988 (age 38)
- Place of birth: Bangka, Indonesia
- Height: 1.72 m (5 ft 7 1/2 in)
- Position: Midfielder

Senior career*
Years	Team	Apps	(Gls)
2011	PS Bangka		
2011–2012	Sriwijaya	1	(0)
- * Club domestic league appearances and goals as of 10 June 2012

Ruly Saputra (born April 18, 1988) is an Indonesian former footballer who plays as a midfielder.

== Honours ==
=== Club honors ===
Sriwijaya

- Indonesia Super League (1): 2011–12
