= Persekat Tegal =

Football club in Central Java, Indonesia

- Full name: Perserikatan Sepakbola Kabupaten Tegal
- Nicknames: Banteng Loreng (The Stripes Bull); Laskar Ki Gede Sebayu (Ki Gede Sebayu Army)
- Short name: TGL
- Founded: 16 August 1962; 64 years ago
- Ground: Tri Sanja Stadium
- Capacity: 10,000
- Owner: PT Persekat Ki Gede Sebayu
- Chairman: Haron Bagas Prakosa
- Head coach: Putu Gede
- League: Liga Nusantara
- 2025–26: Championship Group 1, 9th of 10 (relegated via play-off)
- Website: https://persekat.com/
Home colours	Away colours

Perserikatan Sepakbola Kabupaten Tegal or Persekat is a professional football club based in Tegal Regency, Central Java. They will be competing in the Liga Nusantara next season, following relegation from the Championship in 2025–26 season.

== Players ==
=== Current squad ===
As of 7 February 2026

Note: Flags indicate national team as defined under FIFA eligibility rules; some limited exceptions apply. Players may hold more than one non-FIFA nationality.

No.	Pos.	Nation	Player
2	DF	IDN	Khoirul Amin
4	DF	IDN	Muhammad Mukhlis
5	MF	IDN	Adhe Owen
6	DF	IDN	Rendika Rama
7	MF	IDN	Antonius Tuna (on loan from Semen Padang)
8	MF	IDN	Muhammad Taufiq (captain)
10	MF	POR	Pedro Matos
11	FW	FRA	Sylvain Atieda (on loan from Persik Kediri)
12	DF	IDN	Indra Lesmana
13	DF	IDN	Soni Setiawan
14	DF	IDN	Yusuf Fitra
15	DF	IDN	Surya Maulana
17	GK	IDN	Dimas Fani
18	MF	IDN	Nur Fajar Pratama
19	MF	IDN	Kevy Syahertian
20	FW	IDN	Riki Dwi Saputro
21	FW	IDN	Dirk Auri
23	MF	IDN	Reza Zuhro (on loan from Barito Putera)

No.	Pos.	Nation	Player
25	GK	IDN	Lalu Muhammad Rizki
26	MF	IDN	Rocky Mandosir
27	MF	IDN	Iqbal Maulana
28	MF	IDN	Gede Sunu
32	FW	IDN	Faisal Ramadani
34	DF	IDN	Fedly Damara (on loan from Persebaya Surabaya)
39	MF	IDN	Arsyad Yusgiantoro
41	MF	IDN	Jordan Sette
54	FW	IDN	Marcell Rumkabu
55	DF	IDN	Dandi Maulana
57	DF	IDN	Hamdi Sula
61	GK	IDN	Dzaki Nurfaizi
68	MF	IDN	Madrid Augusta
79	MF	IDN	Genta Alparedo
87	MF	IDN	Nathan Ari (on loan from Bali United)
93	FW	IDN	Ahmad Ihwan
96	DF	BRA	Iuri
97	GK	IDN	Bagus Prasetiyo

== Personnel ==
=== Technical staff ===
Position	Name
Head coach	(Indonesia) Putu Gede
Physical coach	(Indonesia) Lukman Afif
Goalkeeper coach	(Indonesia) Wawan Dermawan, Ajang Widyaningtyas

== Kit supplier ==
- Talenta Sport (2018)
- Grande Apparel (2019−2020)
- WWJD Sport (2021)
- Sebayu (2022−2025)
- Orlin (2025−)

== Season-by-season records ==
Season(s)	League/Division	Tms.	Pos.	Piala Indonesia	AFC competition(s)	
2016	ISC Liga Nusantara	32	Eliminated in Provincial round	–	–	–
2017	Liga 3	32	Eliminated in Provincial round	–	–	–
2018	Liga 3	32	Eliminated in Provincial round	–	–	–
2019	Liga 3	32	3rd, Third round	–	–	–
2020	Liga 2	24	did not finish	–	–	–
2021	Liga 2	24	3rd, Group B	–	–	–
2022–23	Liga 2	28	did not finish	–	–	–
2023–24	Liga 2	28	2nd, Relegation round	–	–	–
2024–25	Liga 2	26	2nd, Relegation round	–	–	–
2025–26	Championship	20	Relegation play-of loser	–	–	–
2026–27	Liga Nusantara	24	TBD	–	–	–

== Honours ==
- Liga 3 Central Java
  - Runner-up (1): 2019
