= Irvan Mofu =

Indonesian footballer

Personal information
- Full name: Irvan Yunus Mofu
- Date of birth: 5 February 1995 (age 31)
- Place of birth: Pinrang, Indonesia
- Height: 1.80 m (5 ft 11 in)
- Position: Forward

Team information
- Current team: Semen Padang
- Number: 10

Senior career*
Years	Team	Apps	(Gls)
2013	Perseman Manokwari	10	(0)
2014	Persita Tangerang	8	(0)
2014	Persepam Madura	4	(0)
2015–2017	Perseru Serui	44	(2)
2018	Karketu Dili	12	(0)
2019	Persiraja Banda Aceh	22	(2)
2021	PSKC Cimahi	4	(2)
2022–2023	Persipura Jayapura	2	(0)
2023–2024	Persipal BU	16	(10)
2024–2025	PSIM Yogyakarta	15	(1)
2025–2026	PSS Sleman	12	(4)
2026–	Semen Padang	0	(0)
- * Club domestic league appearances and goals as of 9 May 2026

Irvan Yunus Mofu (born 8 February 1992) is an Indonesian professional footballer who plays as a forward for Championship club Semen Padang.

== Club career ==
=== Persita Tangerang ===
He made his debut in Persita Tangerang when he plays in 2014 Indonesian Inter Island Cup.

=== Perseru Serui ===
Irvan joined in the squad for 2016 Indonesia Soccer Championship A.

=== Persiraja Banda Aceh ===
In 2019, Mofu signed a year contract with Persiraja Banda Aceh. He made 22 league appearances and scored 2 goals for Persiraja in the 2019 Liga 2.

=== PSKC Cimahi ===
In 2021, Irvan signed a contract with Indonesian Liga 2 club PSKC Cimahi. He made his league debut on 27 September in a 2–1 loss against Perserang Serang, and he also scored his first goal for PSKC in the 90rd minute at the Gelora Bung Karno Madya Stadium, Jakarta.

== Honours ==
PSIM Yogyakarta

- Liga 2: 2024–25

PSS Sleman

- Championship runner up: 2025–26
