= Moses Banggo =

Indonesian footballer

Personal information
- Full name: Moses Naserat Romario Banggo
- Date of birth: 9 May 1990 (age 36)
- Place of birth: Abepura, Papua, Indonesia
- Height: 1.78 m (5 ft 10 in)
- Position: Midfielder

Youth career
- 2005–2007: Kuskus Jayapura
- 2007–2010: Persipura Jayapura

Senior career*
Years	Team	Apps	(Gls)
2010–2012	Persipura Jayapura	9	(0)
2012–2015	Persiram Raja Ampat	33	(2)
2016–2017	Cacusan CF	21	(3)
2017	Persepam Madura Utama	5	(2)
2018	Kalteng Putra	19	(1)
2019	Persewar Waropen	4	(0)
- * Club domestic league appearances and goals as of 27 May 2019

Moses Naserat Romario Banggo (born 9 May 1990), or simply Moses Banggo, is an Indonesian former footballer who plays as a midfielder.

== Honours ==
=== Club ===
Persipura Jayapura

- Indonesia Super League (1): 2010–11
- Indonesian Inter Island Cup (1): 2011
