= Soni Setiawan =

Indonesian footballer

Personal information
- Full name: Soni Setiawan
- Date of birth: 10 April 1993 (age 33)
- Place of birth: Magelang, Indonesia
- Height: 1.72 m (5 ft 8 in)
- Position: Full-back

Team information
- Current team: Persekat Tegal
- Number: 13

Youth career
- 2011–2012: Persekabpur Purworejo

Senior career*
Years	Team	Apps	(Gls)
2012–2013	PPSM Sakti Magelang	10	(0)
2014–2015	Persijap Jepara	13	(0)
2016	Perseden Denpasar	6	(0)
2017–2018	Persis Solo	45	(1)
2018	Madura	2	(0)
2019–2021	PSIS Semarang	13	(0)
2021–2023	Persekat Tegal	17	(1)
2023–2024	Bekasi City	16	(2)
2024–2025	Gresik United	21	(1)
2026–	Persekat Tegal	9	(0)
- * Club domestic league appearances and goals as of 19 April 2026

Soni Setiawan (born 10 April 1993) is an Indonesian professional footballer who plays as a full-back for Liga 2 club Persekat Tegal.

== Club career ==
=== Persekabpur Purworejo ===
When he was 18 years old, Setiawan played for the club Persekabpur Purworejo in the Indonesian League Second Division Level. Soni succeeded in escorting Persekabpur Purworejo to the Round of 8 of National Division II in 2012, so that in the following season Persekabpur Purworejo appeared in Division I.

=== PPSM Sakti Magelang ===
Setiawan played for PPSM Sakti Magelang in the 2012/2013 for the 2013 Liga Indonesia Premier Division (LI). With PPSM Sakti Magelang he has performed 10 matches.

=== Persijap Jepara ===
After defending PPSM Sakti Magelang], Setiawan moved to Persijap Jepara in the 2015 season after previously focusing on participating in the Pre PON Central Java throughout 2014. Unfortunately in 2015, the competition stopped, but Soni still defended Persijap Jepara at the Polda Jateng Cup event but failed to bring Persijap Jepara through the group stage.

=== PSIS Semarang ===
He was signed for PSIS Semarang to play in Liga 1 in the 2019 season. Soni made his debut on 26 May 2019 in a match against Persija Jakarta at the Moch. Soebroto Stadium, Magelang.

=== Persekat Tegal ===
In 2021, Soni signed a contract with Indonesian Liga 2 club Persekat Tegal. He made his league debut on 27 September in a 3–1 win against Badak Lampung, and he also scored his first goal for Persekat in the 88th minute at the Gelora Bung Karno Madya Stadium, Jakarta.
