= Batakan Stadium =

Football stadium in Balikpapan, East Kalimantan, Indonesia

Batakan Stadium of Balikpapan
- Stadion Batakan Balikpapan
- Nickname: Batakan
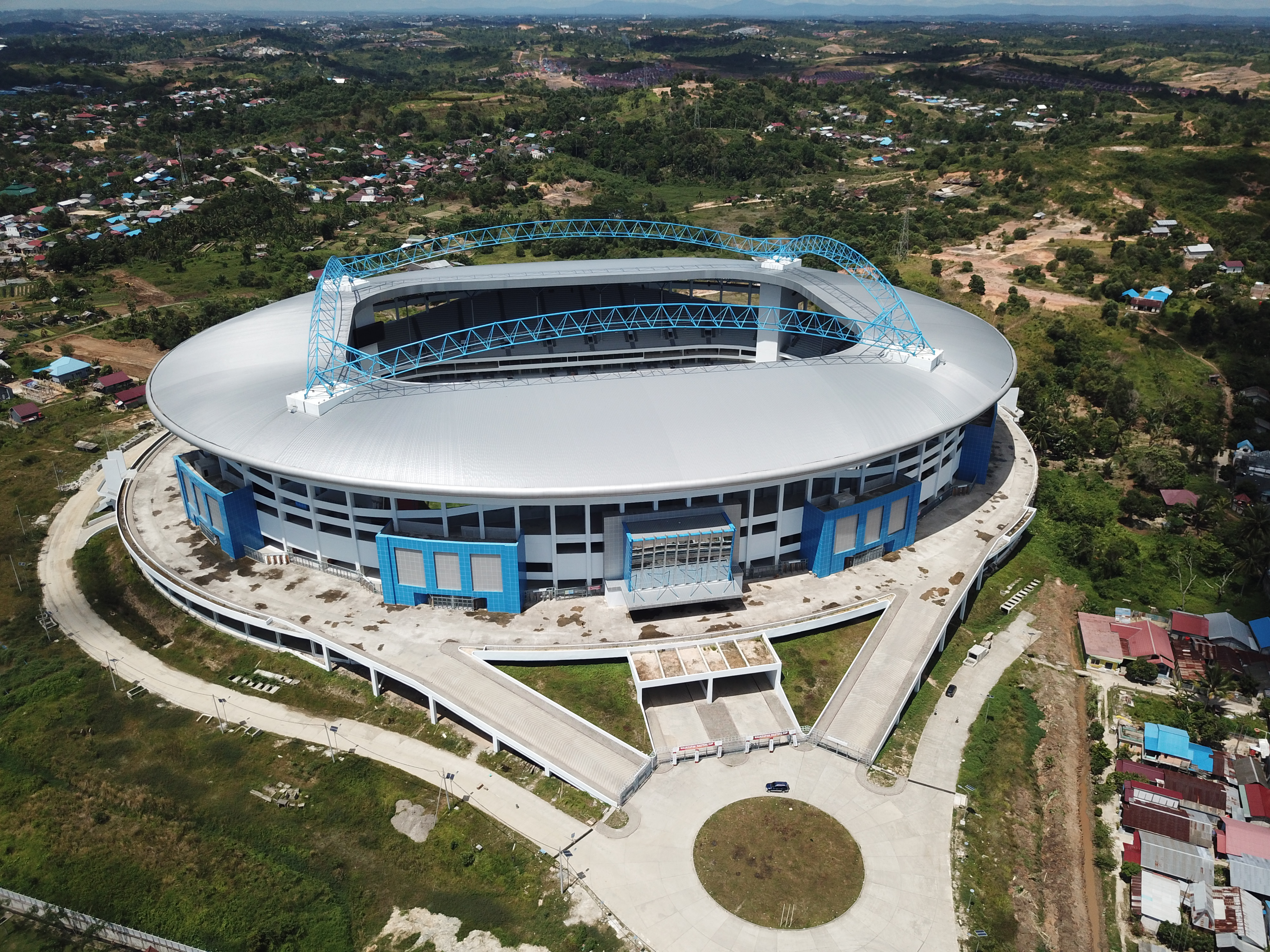
- Aerial view of Batakan Stadium

- Location in Kalimantan and Indonesia Batakan Stadium of Balikpapan (Indonesia)
- Full name: Stadion Batakan Balikpapan
- Location: Balikpapan, East Kalimantan, Indonesia
- Coordinates: 1°13′59.4″S 116°56′36.0″E
- Owner: Balikpapan City Government
- Capacity: 40,000
- Surface: Grass

Construction
- Groundbreaking: 2011
- Built: 2011–2017
- Opened: 2017
- Cost: IDR 1.4 trillion

Tenant
- Persiba Balikpapan (2017–)

The Batakan Stadium of Balikpapan (Indonesian: Stadion Batakan Balikpapan) is a football stadium in Balikpapan, East Kalimantan, Indonesia. The stadium hosts Liga 1 club Borneo Samarinda and Liga 2 club Persiba Balikpapan. The stadium has a capacity of 40,000.

The stadium hosted the opening ceremony of 2020 Liga 2 season on 14 March 2020.

== Gallery ==
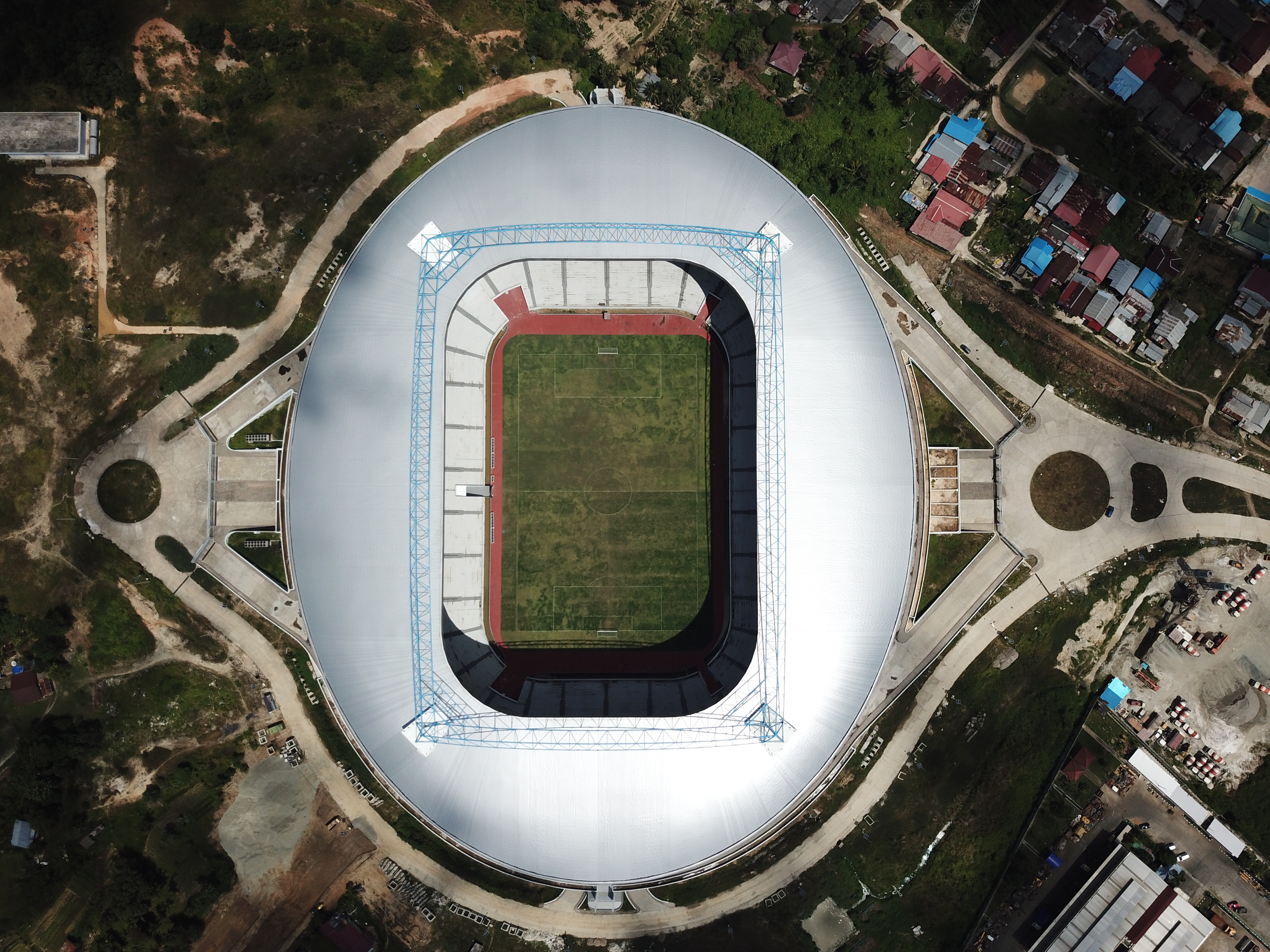

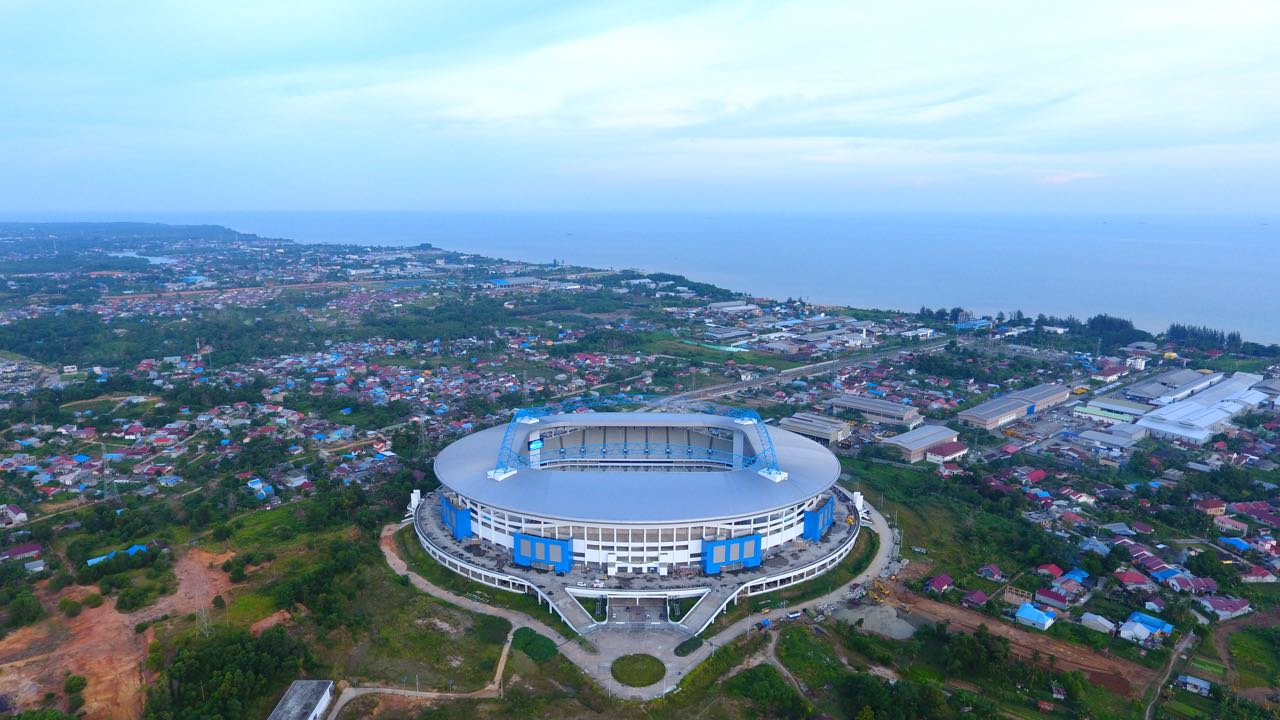
