= Sulut United F.C. =

Association football team in Indonesia

Sulut United
- Full name: Sulawesi Utara United Football Club
- Nicknames: Gorango Utara (The Northern Whaleshark)
- Short name: SUL
- Founded: 1990; 36 years ago, as Persikad Depok; 2017; 9 years ago, as Bogor FC; 2019; 7 years ago, as Sulut United
- Ground: Klabat Stadium
- Capacity: 10,000
- Owner: PT Sulut Bola Prima
- CEO: Mirza Rinaldi Hippy
- Manager: Muhammad Ali Ridho
- Coach: Jaya Hartono
- League: Liga 3 Withdrew and automatically relegated to Liga 4 indonesia
- 2023–24: Liga 2/Relegation Round (Group C), 3rd (relegated)
Home colours	Away colours

Sulawesi Utara United Football Club is an Indonesian football club based in Manado, North Sulawesi. The club was rebranded in May 2019 from Bogor Football Club to Sulut United F.C. and headquartered at Klabat Stadium which became their home venue. The club currently plays in Liga 3 or more specifically Liga Nusantara. However, the club withdrew this season. And automatically relegated to Liga 4 indonesia

== History ==
The club's roots go back to 1990, formed as Persikad Depok played in Depok, West Java. In 2009, Persikad experienced a severe financial crisis that left the management team owing 11 months' wages to the players. A businessman named Edy Djoekardi rescued the team by buying a majority stake in PT. Persikad Depok. Djoekardi planned to invest millions of dollars to build a team capable of performing up to the international scene, and to build infrastructure, such as stadiums. The club briefly moved to Purwakarta and played as Persikad Purwakarta in 2015 but returned again to Depok a year later. Persikad Depok finally was sold and move to Bogor and rebranded as Bogor Football Club in 2017 similar story to Milton Keynes Dons, but later the supporters formed a phoenix club called Persikad 1999 in 2018 with purchasing other club's linsence in Liga 3 from Purwakarta, Mars Gelatik.

In 2018, they played in Liga 3 from National Zone Route as continuation of Persikad Depok under Bogor Football Club name.

The club had a promising start in 2019 with signing some great players and hiring Vladimir Vujovic as head coach but later it turned into shambles after the chairman suddenly left club before the Liga 2 2019 season starts.

In May 2019, the club moved to Manado and once again changed their identity from Bogor Football Club to Sulut United.

== Coaching staff ==
Position	Staff
Manager Team	(Indonesia) Muhammad Ridho Ali
Head coach	(Indonesia) Jaya Hartono
Assistant coach	(Indonesia) Dian Oktovery
Fitness coach	(Indonesia) Andar Suhendar
Goalkeeper coach	(Indonesia) Jendri Pitoy
Kitman	(Indonesia) Kardiansyah
Kitman	(Indonesia) Arly Rei
Media Officer	(Indonesia) Oktavianus Rondonuwu

== Season-by-season records ==
As Persikad Depok

Season(s)	League/Division	Tier	Tms.	Pos.	Piala Indonesia	AFC/AFF competition(s)	
2002	Second Division	3		2	–	–	–
2003	First Division	2	26	4th, Group A	–	–	–
2004	First Division	2	24	10th, West division	–	–	–
2005	First Division	2	27	4th, Group 1	–	–	–
2006	First Division	2	36	4th, Group 2	–	–	–
2007	First Division	2	40	2	–	–	–
2008–09	Premier Division	2	29	10th, Group 1	–	–	–
2009–10	Premier Division	2	33	Disqualified	–	–	–
2010	First Division	3	57	5th, Group 5	–	–	–
2012	First Division (BLAI)	3	56	5th, Third round	–	–	–
2013	Premier Division	2	39	9th, Group 2	–	–	–
2014	Premier Division	2	63	6th, Group 2	–	–	–
2015	Premier Division	2	55	did not finish	–	–	–
2016	Indonesia Soccer Championship B	2	53	4th, Group 2	–	–	–
2017	Liga 2	2	61	5th, Group 2	–	–	–

As Bogor FC

Season(s)	League/Division	Tier	Tms.	Pos.	Piala Indonesia	AFC/AFF competition(s)	
2018	Liga 3	3	32	3rd, Third round	–	–	–

As Sulut United

Season(s)	League/Division	Tier	Tms.	Pos.	Piala Indonesia	AFC/AFF competition(s)	
2019	Liga 2	2	23	6th, East division	–	–	–
2020	Liga 2	2	24	did not finish	–	–	–
2021–22	Liga 2	2	24	3rd, Second round	–	–	–
2022–23	Liga 2	2	28	did not finish	–	–	–
2023–24	Liga 2	2	28	3rd, Relegation round	–	–	–
2024–25	Liga Nusantara	3	16	Withdrew	–	–	–
