= 2024 Liga 2 (Indonesia) final =

2024 Liga 2 finals
- Event: 2023–24 Liga 2
PSBS Biak	Semen Padang
6	0

First leg
PSBS Biak	Semen Padang
3	0
- Date: 5 March 2024
- Venue: Cendrawasih Stadium, Biak
- Referee: Fibay Rahmatullah
- Attendance: 2,483

Second leg
Semen Padang	PSBS Biak
0	3
- Date: 9 March 2024
- Venue: Gelora Haji Agus Salim Stadium, Padang
- Referee: Amri Nurhadi
- Attendance: 11,400

The 2024 Liga 2 finals was the final match of the 2023–24 Liga 2, the 13th season of second-tier competition in Indonesia organised by PT Liga Indonesia Baru, and the fifth season since it was renamed from the Liga Indonesia Premier Division to the Liga 2. It was played at the Cendrawasih Stadium in Biak and Gelora Haji Agus Salim Stadium in Padang on 05 and 9 March 2024.

== Road to the final ==
Note: In all results below, the score of the finalist is given first (H: home; A: away).

PSBS Biak				Round	Semen Padang			
Group 4 winners				First round	Group 1 winners			
Group Z winners				Second round	Group X winners			
Opponent	Agg.	1st leg	2nd leg	Knockout round	Opponent	Agg.	1st leg	2nd leg
Persiraja	5–1	1–1 (A)	4–1 (H)	Semi-finals	Malut United	2–1	1–1 (A)	1–0 (H)

== Matches ==
=== First leg ===
5 March 2024
15:00 WIT (UTC+09:00)

PSBS Biak	3–0	Semen Padang
Ardiansyah 27' (o.g.); Alexsandro 45'; Beto Gonçalves 79'	Report

Cendrawasih Stadium, Biak
Attendance: 2,483
Referee: Fibay Rahmatullah

GK	97	(Indonesia) Mario Londok
CB	15	(Indonesia) Fabiano Beltrame
CB	23	(Indonesia) Otávio Dutra
CB	14	(Indonesia) Ruben Sanadi (c)
MF	24	(Indonesia) Febrianto Uopmabin
MF	90	(Indonesia) Nelson Alom	(yellow card) 90'
MF	4	(Indonesia) Diandra Diaz		(substituted off) 80'
MF	32	(Indonesia) Muhammad Tahir
FW	7	(Indonesia) Osas Saha		(substituted off) 61'
FW	9	(Indonesia) Beto Gonçalves
FW	10	(Brazil) Alexsandro		(substituted off) 90+1'
Substitutes:
GK	45	(Indonesia) Panggih Prio
DF	20	(Indonesia) Melcior Majefat		(substituted in) 90+1'
DF	8	(South Korea) Hwang Do-yeon
MF	91	(Indonesia) Anis Nabar		(substituted in) 61'
MF	6	(Indonesia) Marthinus Isir		(substituted in) 80'
MF	22	(Indonesia) Melvis Uaga
FW	11	(Indonesia) Vendry Mofu
FW	18	(Indonesia) Milan Nere
Manager:
(Indonesia) Regi Aditya

GK	84	(Indonesia) Mukhti Alhaq
RB	3	(Indonesia) Wiganda Pradika (c)
CB	4	(Indonesia) Agus Nova	(yellow card) 88'
CB	78	(Indonesia) Hadi Ardiansyah	(yellow card) 39'
LB	12	(Indonesia) Zulkifli Kosepa		(substituted off) 45'
CM	87	(Indonesia) Dwiki Arya		(substituted off) 80'
CM	11	(Indonesia) Risna Prahalabenta
RW	15	(Indonesia) Firman Juliansyah
AM	99	(Indonesia) Fandi Eko Utomo
LW	23	(Indonesia) Arsyad Yusgiantoro		(substituted off) 24'
CF	93	(Indonesia) Ahmad Ihwan
Substitutes:
GK	33	(Indonesia) Fakhrurrazi Quba
DF	22	(Indonesia) Kaleb Sobor
DF	28	(Indonesia) Syaiful Ramadhan
MF	7	(Indonesia) Genta Alparedo		(substituted in) 45'
MF	8	(Indonesia) Ocvian Chanigio		(substituted in) 80'
MF	10	(Indonesia) Vivi Asriza
MF	31	(Indonesia) Rosad Setiawan
FW	17	(Indonesia) Rendy Setiawan		(substituted in) 24'
Manager:
(Indonesia) Delfiadri

=== Second leg ===
5 March 2024
19:00 WIB (UTC+07:00)

Semen Padang	0–3	PSBS Biak
	Report	Beto Gonçalves 12', 50'; Alexsandro 28'

Gelora Haji Agus Salim Stadium, Padang
Attendance: 11,400
Referee: Amri Nurhadi

GK	33	(Indonesia) Fakhrurrazi Quba
RB	3	(Indonesia) Wiganda Pradika		(substituted off) 74'
CB	4	(Indonesia) Agus Nova
CB	5	(South Korea) Kim Min-gyu		(substituted off) 43'
LB	28	(Indonesia) Syaiful Ramadhan
CM	31	(Indonesia) Rosad Setiawan (c)	(yellow card) 28'
CM	11	(Indonesia) Risna Prahalabenta		(substituted off) 34'
RW	15	(Indonesia) Firman Juliansyah	(yellow card) 45+3'
AM	8	(Indonesia) Ocvian Chanigio		(substituted off) 45+1'
LW	10	(Indonesia) Vivi Asriza		(substituted off) 45'
CF	93	(Indonesia) Ahmad Ihwan
Substitutes:
GK	34	(Indonesia) Ikram Algiffari
DF	78	(Indonesia) Hadi Ardiansyah		(substituted in) 43'
DF	12	(Indonesia) Zulkifli Kosepa
MF	7	(Indonesia) Genta Alparedo		(substituted in) 45+1'
MF	23	(Indonesia) Arsyad Yusgiantoro		(substituted in) 45'
MF	81	(Indonesia) Dwiki Arya		(substituted in) 34'
MF	99	(Indonesia) Fandi Eko Utomo
FW	17	(Indonesia) Rendy Setiawan		(substituted in) 74'
Manager:
(Indonesia) Delfiadri

GK	97	(Indonesia) Mario Londok
CB	15	(Indonesia) Fabiano Beltrame
CB	23	(Indonesia) Otávio Dutra
CB	14	(Indonesia) Ruben Sanadi (c)
MF	24	(Indonesia) Febrianto Uopmabin
MF	90	(Indonesia) Nelson Alom	(yellow card) 67'	(substituted off) 78'
MF	4	(Indonesia) Diandra Diaz		(substituted off) 78'
MF	32	(Indonesia) Muhammad Tahir
FW	7	(Indonesia) Osas Saha		(substituted off) 64'
FW	9	(Indonesia) Beto Gonçalves
FW	10	(Brazil) Alexsandro		(substituted off) 90+1'
Substitutes:
GK	45	(Indonesia) Panggih Prio
DF	20	(Indonesia) Melcior Majefat
DF	8	(South Korea) Hwang Do-yeon
MF	91	(Indonesia) Anis Nabar		(substituted in) 64'
MF	6	(Indonesia) Marthinus Isir		(substituted in) 78'
MF	22	(Indonesia) Melvis Uaga
FW	11	(Indonesia) Vendry Mofu		(substituted in) 78'
FW	18	(Indonesia) Milan Nere
Manager:
(Indonesia) Regi Aditya
