= 2019 Liga 2 (Indonesia) final =

2019 Liga 2 final
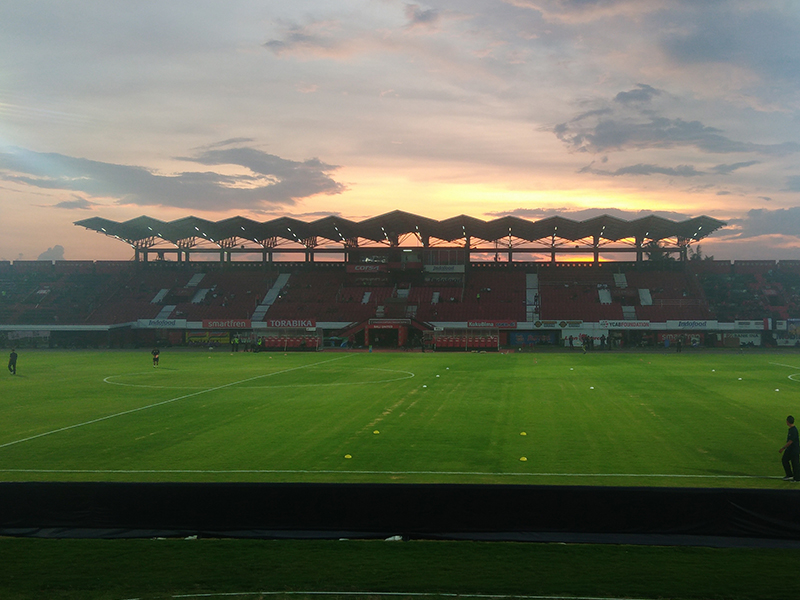
- The Kapten I Wayan Dipta in Gianyar hosted the final
- Event: 2019 Liga 2
Persita	Persik
2	3
- Date: 25 November 2019
- Venue: Kapten I Wayan Dipta Stadium, Gianyar
- Man of the Match: Taufiq Febriyanto
- Referee: Sance Lawita
- Attendance: 3,656

The 2019 Liga 2 final was the final match of the 2019 Liga 2, the tenth season of second-tier competition in Indonesia organised by PT Liga Indonesia Baru, and the third season since it was renamed from the Liga Indonesia Premier Division to the Liga 2. It was played at the Kapten I Wayan Dipta Stadium in Gianyar, Bali on 25 November 2019.

Persik won the match 3–2 and secured their first title in this competition as second-tier and second title overall.

== Road to the final ==
Note: In all results below, the score of the finalist is given first (H: home; A: away).

Persita		Round	Persik	
West region runners-up: Pos / Team / Pld / Pts; 1 / Persiraja (P) / 22 / 42; 2 / Persita (P) / 22 / 42; 3 / Sriwijaya / 22 / 40; 4 / PSMS / 22 / 37; 5 / PSCS / 22 / 36; Source: Standings Liga 2 Group Barat (P) Promoted		First round	East region winners: Pos / Team / Pld / Pts; 1 / Persik (C, P) / 20 / 33; 2 / Persewar / 20 / 31; 3 / Martapura / 20 / 31; 4 / Mitra Kukar / 20 / 30; 5 / Persis / 20 / 30; Source: Standings Liga 2 Group Timur (C) Champions; (P) Promoted	
Group Y winners: Pos / Team / Pld / Pts; 1 / Persita / 3 / 6; 2 / Persik / 3 / 5; 3 / PSMS / 3 / 4; 4 / Martapura / 3 / 1; Source: Standings Liga 2 Group Y		Second round	Group Y runners-up: Pos / Team / Pld / Pts; 1 / Persita / 3 / 6; 2 / Persik / 3 / 5; 3 / PSMS / 3 / 4; 4 / Martapura / 3 / 1; Source: Standings Liga 2 Group Y	
Opponent	Score	Knockout round	Opponent	Score
Sriwijaya	0–0 (3–2 p)	Semi-finals	Persiraja	0–0 (5–4 p)

== Match ==
Times listed below are UTC+8.

=== Details ===
25 November 2019
20:00

Persita	2–3	Persik
M. Roby 24'; S. Arvani 38'	Report	R. Prahalabenta 11'; S. Wijaya 14'; W.S. Fanosa 90+1'

Kapten I Wayan Dipta Stadium, Gianyar
Attendance: 3,656
Referee: Sance Lawita

GK	23	(Indonesia) Annas Fitrianto
DF	11	(Indonesia) M. Toha
DF	16	(Indonesia) Muhammad Roby
DF	55	(Indonesia) Novrianto		(substituted off) 18'
DF	27	(Indonesia) Zikri Akbar	(yellow card) 55'
MF	66	(Indonesia) Asri Akbar		(substituted off) 62'
MF	8	(Indonesia) Egi Melgiansyah	(yellow card) 70'
MF	21	(Indonesia) Amarzukih
FW	29	(Indonesia) Sirvi Arvani
FW	10	(Indonesia) Aldi Al Achya	(yellow card) 31'
FW	99	(Indonesia) Redi Rusmawan	(yellow card) 3'	(substituted off) 80'
Substitutes:
GK	28	(Indonesia) Yogi Triana
DF	98	(Indonesia) Habibi
DF	12	(Indonesia) Rio Ramandika		(substituted on) 18'
MF	78	(Indonesia) Yus Arfandi
MF	7	(Indonesia) Ade Jantra
FW	5	(Indonesia) Adittia Gigis		(substituted on) 62'
FW	9	(Indonesia) Diego Banowo		(substituted on) 80'
Manager:
(Indonesia) Widodo C. Putro

GK	71	(Indonesia) Fajar Setya Jaya
DF	22	(Indonesia) Ibrahim Sanjaya
DF	3	(Indonesia) Obet Choiri
DF	2	(Indonesia) Risna Prahalabenta	(yellow card) 74'
DF	97	(Indonesia) Edo Febriansyah	(yellow card) 31'
MF	93	(Indonesia) Galih Akbar
MF	6	(Indonesia) Krisna Bayu Otto
MF	8	(Indonesia) Taufiq Febriyanto
FW	13	(Indonesia) Faris Aditama
FW	79	(Indonesia) Iqbal Nur Samsu		(substituted off) 53'
FW	19	(Indonesia) Sandrian		(substituted off) 65'
Substitutes:
GK	47	(Indonesia) Junaidi Bakhtiar
DF	39	(Indonesia) Dedi Irawadi
DF	23	(Indonesia) Handoyo Putro
MF	31	(Indonesia) Yusuf Meilana		(substituted on) 53'
MF	45	(Indonesia) Eka Prasetya
MF	77	(Indonesia) Juan Revi
FW	27	(Indonesia) Wimba Fanosa		(substituted on) 65'
Manager:
(Indonesia) Budiarjo Thalib

Man of the Match:
???

Assistant referees:
???
???
Fourth official:
???

Match rules

- 90 minutes.
- 30 minutes of extra time if necessary.
- Penalty shoot-out if scores still level.
- Seven named substitutes, of which up to three may be used.
