= Rezam Baskoro =

Indonesian association football player

Personal information
- Full name: Mohammad Rezam Baskoro
- Date of birth: 24 July 1996 (age 30)
- Place of birth: Palu, Indonesia
- Height: 1.69 m (5 ft 7 in)
- Positions: Right-back; winger

Team information
- Current team: Persiraja Banda Aceh
- Number: 27

Youth career
- 2016: PON Kaltim

Senior career*
Years	Team	Apps	(Gls)
2017–2018	Celebest	4	(0)
2019–2020	Bandung United	17	(10)
2020–2021	Persiraja Banda Aceh	1	(0)
2024–	Persiraja Banda Aceh	8	(0)
- * Club domestic league appearances and goals as of 26 October 2024

Mohammad Rezam Baskoro (born July 24, 1996) is an Indonesian professional footballer who plays as a right-back and winger for Liga 2 club Persiraja Banda Aceh.

== Club career ==
=== Celebest ===
He was signed for Celebest to play in Liga 2 in the 2017 season.

=== Bandung United ===
In 2019, Rezam Baskoro signed a year contract with Bandung United from Celebest. Rezam scored 10 goals in the 2019 season, when Bandung United played in the second division. He finished the season scoring in total 10 league goals and became third highest top goalscorer in 2019 Liga 2.

=== Persiraja ===
For 2020 season, he joined Persiraja to compete in Liga 1.
