= Alif Jaelani =

Indonesian footballer

Personal information
- Full name: Alif Jaelani Ruslan
- Date of birth: 5 July 2002 (age 24)
- Place of birth: Makassar, Indonesia
- Height: 1.72 m (5 ft 8 in)
- Position: Midfielder

Team information
- Current team: Gresik United
- Number: 22

Youth career
- 2018: Barito Putera
- 2019–2020: Garuda Select

Senior career*
Years	Team	Apps	(Gls)
2021–2024	Barito Putera	3	(0)
2022	→ PSPS Pekanbaru (loan)	5	(1)
2023–2024	→ Persekat Tegal (loan)	15	(0)
2024	Persikabo 1973	7	(0)
2025–	Gresik United	19	(4)
- * Club domestic league appearances and goals as of 8 January 2026

Alif Jaelani Ruslan (born 5 July 2002) is an Indonesian professional footballer who plays as a midfielder for Liga Nusantara club Gresik United.

== Club career ==
=== Barito Putera ===
He was signed for Barito Putera to play in Liga 1 in the 2021 season. Alif made his professional debut on 23 September 2021 in a match against Persikabo 1973 at the Wibawa Mukti Stadium, Cikarang.

==== PSPS Riau (loan) ====
On 5 September 2022, Alif signed a contract with Liga 2 club PSPS Pekanbaru, on loan from Barito Putera. Alif made his league debut on 10 September 2022 in a 1–0 away lose against Perserang Serang. On 22 September 2022, Alif scored his first goal for PSPS Pekanbaru, scored a penalty in injury time of second half in a 3–4 home lose at the Riau Main Stadium.

==== Persekat Tegal (loan) ====
On 2 September 2023, Alif signed a contract with Liga 2 club Persekat Tegal, on loan from Barito Putera. Alif made his league debut on 10 September 2023 in a 2–0 away lose against Gresik United.

== Career statistics ==
=== Club ===
As of 8 January 2026.

Club	Season	League			Cup		Other		Total	
Club	Season	Division	Apps	Goals	Apps	Goals	Apps	Goals	Apps	Goals
Barito Putera	2021–22	Liga 1	3	0	–		4 (Note: Appearances in Menpora Cup)	1	7	1
Barito Putera	2022–23	Liga 1	0	0	–		0	0	0	0
Barito Putera	2023–24	Liga 1	0	0	–		0	0	0	0
PSPS Pekanbaru (loan)	2022–23	Liga 2	5	1	–		0	0	5	1
Persekat Tegal (loan)	2023–24	Liga 2	15	0	–		0	0	15	0
Persikabo 1973	2024–25	Liga 2	7	0	–		0	0	7	0
Gresik United	2024–25	Liga 2	9	2	–		0	0	9	2
Gresik United	2025–26	Liga Nusantara	10	2	–		0	0	10	2
Career total			49	5	0	0	4	1	53	6
