= Husnuzhon =

Indonesian association football player

Personal information
- Date of birth: 21 January 1997 (age 29)
- Place of birth: Aceh Tamiang, Indonesia
- Height: 1.74 m (5 ft 9 in)
- Position: Forward

Team information
- Current team: Sriwijaya
- Number: 9

Youth career
- 2014–2015: PSMS Medan
- 2015–2016: PS TNI

Senior career*
Years	Team	Apps	(Gls)
2017	PSBL Langsa	5	(1)
2017–2018	Persika Karawang	19	(3)
2018–2021	Persiraja Banda Aceh	28	(8)
2022	Putra Delta Sidoarjo	4	(2)
2023	Persiraja Banda Aceh	2	(0)
2024	Persipasi Kota Bekasi	1	(0)
2025–2026	Persekabpas Pasuruan	10	(1)
2026–	Sriwijaya	7	(0)
- * Club domestic league appearances and goals as of 2 May 2026

Husnuzhon (born 21 January 1997), is an Indonesian professional footballer who plays as a forward for Championship club Sriwijaya.

== Career ==
Husnuzhon started his career when he participated in the PSMS Medan junior selection in 2015. His slick performances made him immediately promoted to the senior team and played in 2016 Indonesia Soccer Championship B. Only appearing half a season for PSMS, he then joined PS TNI which competed in the U-21 ISC. Together with PS TNI, he managed to bring PS TNI out as the champion of ISC U-21. Before joined Persiraja Banda Aceh in 2018, he briefly joined PSBL Langsa and Persika Karawang.

=== Persiraja Banda Aceh ===
On 2 August 2018, Husnuzhon signed a contract with Persiraja Banda Aceh. He made his debut at Persiraja in the second round of the 2018 Liga 2 season. Husnuzhon suffered several injuries which forced him to miss out . In the 2019 season, he had to undergo a three-month recovery period from a tendon injury while playing for Persiraja Banda Aceh in the 2019 Liga 2 season until this team was promote to Liga 1.

== Personal life ==
Husnuzhon hails from Kuala Simpang, Aceh Tamiang and is the son of Masmurjianto and Husnul Fatni. He is also a second sergeant in the Army Military Police Corps (Indonesia). He is also an active member of the TNI who serves in Central Jakarta.

== Honours ==
=== Club ===
PS TNI U-21

- Indonesia Soccer Championship U-21: 2016

Persiraja

- Liga 2 third place (play-offs): 2019
