= Junaidi Bakhtiar =

Indonesian footballer

Personal information
- Full name: Junaidi Bakhtiar
- Date of birth: 29 November 1995 (age 30)
- Place of birth: Bandar Lampung, Indonesia
- Height: 1.75 m (5 ft 9 in)
- Position: Goalkeeper

Youth career
- –2016: Akademi Harbi

Senior career*
Years	Team	Apps	(Gls)
2017	Kalteng Putra	0	(0)
2018	PS Sumbawa Barat	0	(0)
2018	Persema Malang	10	(0)
2018	Persinga Ngawi	9	(0)
2019–2020	Persik Kediri	13	(0)
2021–2023	PSIM Yogyakarta	2	(0)
2023–2024	Persipa Pati	1	(0)
2025	Persikabo 1973	1	(0)
- * Club domestic league appearances and goals as of 11 January 2025

Junaidi Bakhtiar (born 29 November 1995) is an Indonesian professional footballer who plays as a goalkeeper.

== Club career ==
=== Persik Kediri ===
He was signed for Persik Kediri to play in Liga 2 in the 2019 season. On 25 November 2019 Persik successfully won the 2019 Liga 2 Final and promoted to Liga 1, after defeating Persita Tangerang 3–2 at the Kapten I Wayan Dipta Stadium, Gianyar.

=== PSIM Yogyakarta ===
In 2021, Junaidi signed a contract with Indonesian Liga 2 club PSIM Yogyakarta. He made his league debut on 26 September in a 1–0 loss against PSCS Cilacap at the Manahan Stadium, Surakarta.

== Honours ==
=== Club ===
Persik Kediri

- Liga 2: 2019
