= Krisna Bayu Otto =

Indonesian footballer

Bayu Otto
Personal information
- Full name: Krisna Bayu Otto Kartika
- Date of birth: 15 October 1999 (age 27)
- Place of birth: Kediri, Indonesia
- Height: 1.63 m (5 ft 4 in)
- Position: Midfielder

Team information
- Current team: Persik Kediri
- Number: 6

Youth career
- 2015: SSB Triple'S
- 2016: Persedikab Kediri

Senior career*
Years	Team	Apps	(Gls)
2017–2018	Persedikab Kediri	20	(1)
2019–	Persik Kediri	157	(8)
- * Club domestic league appearances and goals as of 22:30, 26 October 2026 (UTC)

Krisna Bayu Otto Kartika (born 15 October 1999), often mentioned Bayu Otto, is an Indonesian professional footballer who plays as a midfielder for Super League club Persik Kediri.

== Club career ==
=== Persedikab Kediri ===
On 2017, Bayu Otto signed a two-years contract with Liga 3 club Persedikab Kediri. He made 20 league appearances and scored 1 goal for Persedikab.

=== Persik Kediri ===
He was signed for Persik Kediri to play in Liga 2 in the 2019 season. On 25 November 2019 Persik successfully won the 2019 Liga 2 Final and promoted to Liga 1, after defeated Persita Tangerang 3–2 at the Kapten I Wayan Dipta Stadium, Gianyar.

== Career statistics ==
=== Club ===
As of match played 26 October 2026

Club	Season	League			Cup		Continental		Other		Total	
Club	Season	Division	Apps	Goals	Apps	Goals	Apps	Goals	Apps	Goals	Apps	Goals
Persedikab Kediri	2017	Liga 3	4	0	0	0	–		0	0	4	0
Persedikab Kediri	2018	Liga 3	16	1	0	0	–		0	0	16	1
Persedikab Kediri	Total		20	1	0	0	–		0	0	20	1
Persik Kediri	2019	Liga 2	19	3	0	0	–		0	0	19	3
Persik Kediri	2020	Liga 1	1	0	0	0	–		0	0	1	0
Persik Kediri	2021–22	Liga 1	15	0	0	0	–		4 (Note: Appearances in Menpora Cup)	0	19	0
Persik Kediri	2022–23	Liga 1	29	2	0	0	–		0	0	29	2
Persik Kediri	2023–24	Liga 1	31	2	0	0	–		0	0	31	2
Persik Kediri	2024–25	Liga 1	27	1	0	0	–		0	0	27	1
Persik Kediri	2025–26	Super League	28	0	0	0	–		0	0	28	0
Persik Kediri	2026–27	Super League	7	0	0	0	–		0	0	7	0
Career total			177	9	0	0	0	0	4	0	181	9

== Honours ==
=== Club ===
Persik Kediri

- Liga 2: 2019
