= Fakhrurrazi Quba =

Indonesian footballer

Fakhrurrazi
Personal information
- Full name: Fakhrurrazi Quba
- Date of birth: 29 September 1989 (age 37)
- Place of birth: North Aceh, Indonesia
- Height: 5 ft 10 in (1.78 m)
- Position: Goalkeeper

Team information
- Current team: PSMS Medan
- Number: 31

Youth career
- 2008: PSBL Langsa
- 2009: PSLS Lhokseumawe

Senior career*
Years	Team	Apps	(Gls)
2009–2012	PSAP Sigli	50	(0)
2013–2016	Semen Padang	14	(0)
2019–2022	Persiraja Banda Aceh	47	(0)
2022–2023	Madura United	1	(0)
2023–2024	Semen Padang	11	(0)
2024–	PSMS Medan	19	(0)
- * Club domestic league appearances and goals as of 11 April 2026

Fakhrurrazi Quba (born 29 September 1989) is an Indonesian professional footballer who plays as a goalkeeper for Liga 2 club PSMS Medan.

== Club career ==
=== Youth career ===
He began his career in youth level playing for PSBL Langsa and PSLS Lhokseumawe.

=== PSAP Sigli ===
In 2010 he joined PSAP Sigli. He played in the 2011-12 Indonesia Super League. He spent his time in PSAP for 2 years.

=== Semen Padang ===
In 2013 he joined Semen Padang and spent 4 years playing for them. Within this period, he also played in 2013 AFC Cup matches.

=== Persiraja Banda Aceh ===
Between 2016 and 2018, he had very bad injuries so that he was recovering and did not play any official match. In 2019, Persiraja signed him to compete in 2019 Liga 2. As the team's first choice goalkeeper, he played a big role to help Persiraja to win third place of the league and secured a promotion to Liga 1. In 2020, Persiraja extended his contract, so he will play for them in 2020 Liga 1.

=== Madura United ===
Fakhrurrazi was signed for Madura United to play in Liga 1 in the 2022–23 season.

== Club statistics ==
As of match played 11 April 2026

Club	Season	League			National Cup (Note: Includes Piala Indonesia.)		Continental (Note: Appearances in AFC Cup.)		Total	
Club	Season	Division	Apps	Goals	Apps	Goals	Apps	Goals	Apps	Goals
PSAP Sigli	2009–10	Premier Division	1	0	0	0	0	0	1	0
PSAP Sigli	2010–11	Premier Division	21	0	0	0	0	0	21	0
PSAP Sigli	2011-12	ISL	28	0	0	0	0	0	28	0
Semen Padang	2013	IPL	0	0	0	0	3	0	3	0
Semen Padang	2014	ISL	14	0	1	0	0	0	15	0
Semen Padang	2015	ISL	0	0	0	0	0	0	0	0
Semen Padang	2016	ISC A	0	0	0	0	0	0	0	0
Persiraja	2019	Liga 2	24	0	1	0	0	0	25	0
Persiraja	2020	Liga 1	3	0	0	0	0	0	3	0
Persiraja	2021–22	Liga 1	20	0	0	0	0	0	20	0
Madura United	2022–23	Liga 1	1	0	0	0	0	0	1	0
Semen Padang	2023–24	Liga 2	11	0	0	0	0	0	11	0
PSMS Medan	2024–25	Liga 2	16	0	0	0	0	0	16	0
PSMS Medan	2025–26	Liga 2	3	0	0	0	0	0	3	0
Total			143	0	2	0	3	0	148	0

== Honours ==
=== Club ===
Persiraja Banda Aceh

- Liga 2 third place (play-offs): 2019

Semen Padang

- Liga 2 runner-up: 2023–24
