= Assanur Rijal =

Indonesian footballer (born 1996)

Personal information
- Full name: Assanur Rijal
- Date of birth: 2 March 1996 (age 30)
- Place of birth: Aceh Besar, Indonesia
- Height: 1.65 m (5 ft 5 in)
- Position: Forward

Team information
- Current team: PSAB Aceh Besar
- Number: 23

Youth career
- SSB Indrapuri

Senior career*
Years	Team	Apps	(Gls)
2017–2018	Aceh United	26	(6)
2019–2021	Persiraja Banda Aceh	30	(12)
2021–2022	Persis Solo	5	(0)
2022	→ Persiraja Banda Aceh (loan)	13	(1)
2022	Bekasi City	3	(0)
2023–2024	PSMS Medan	12	(0)
2024–2025	Persiraja Banda Aceh	9	(0)
2025–	PSAB Aceh Besar		
- * Club domestic league appearances and goals as of 17 February 2025

Assanur Rijal (born 2 March 1996) is an Indonesian professional footballer who plays as a forward for Liga 4 club PSAB Aceh Besar.

== Club career ==
=== Aceh United ===
In 2017 he joined Aceh United to compete in 2017 Liga 3. By the end of the season, he helped Aceh United to promote to Liga 2 for 2018 season. He was chosen as the best player of the league for this season, as well. The following season, he helped Aceh United to advance to second round in 2018 Liga 2, however, the team failed to secure a promotion to Liga 1. In the beginning of 2019, Aceh United was sold to other owner, and Assanur Rijal decided to resign from the club.

=== Persiraja Banda Aceh ===
In 2019, he joined another club from Aceh, Persiraja Banda Aceh to compete in 2019 Liga 2. He was the top goalscorer of the club in this season with 12 goals, and became the second top goalscorer of the league. He also helped Persiraja to promote to Liga 1. He scored the winning goal for Persiraja in the third place play-off against Sriwijaya. He made his Liga 1 debut on 29 February 2020, when Persiraja hosted Bhayangkara in the first Persiraja's match in 2020 Liga 1.

=== Persis Solo ===
In 2021, Assanur Rijal signed a contract with Indonesian Liga 2 club Persis Solo. He made his league debut on 5 October 2021 against Persijap Jepara at the Manahan Stadium, Surakarta.

=== Return to Persiraja Banda Aceh ===
He was signed for Persiraja Banda Aceh to play in the Liga 1 in the 2021–22 season. Rijal made his league debut on 7 January 2022 in a match against PSS Sleman at the Ngurah Rai Stadium, Denpasar.

=== Bekasi City ===
On 7 June 2022, it was announced that Rijal would be joining Bekasi City for the 2022–23 Liga 2 campaign.

== Club statistics ==
As of match played 17 February 2025

Club	Season	League			National Cup (Note: Includes Piala Indonesia)		Continental		Other		Total	
Club	Season	Division	Apps	Goals	Apps	Goals	Apps	Goals	Apps	Goals	Apps	Goals
Aceh United	2017	Liga 3	6	3	0	0	0	0	0	0	6	3
Aceh United	2018	Liga 2	20	3	2	0	0	0	0	0	22	3
Persiraja	2019	Liga 2	27	12	1	0	0	0	0	0	28	12
Persiraja	2020	Liga 1	3	0	0	0	0	0	0	0	3	0
Persiraja	2021–22	Liga 1	0	0	0	0	0	0	3 (Note: Appearances in Menpora Cup)	4	3	4
Persis Solo	2021	Liga 2	5	0	0	0	0	0	0	0	5	0
Persiraja Banda Aceh (loan)	2021–22	Liga 1	13	1	0	0	0	0	0	0	13	1
Bekasi City	2022–23	Liga 2	3	0	0	0	0	0	0	0	3	0
PSMS Medan	2023–24	Liga 2	12	0	0	0	0	0	0	0	12	0
Persiraja Banda Aceh	2024–25	Liga 2	9	0	0	0	0	0	0	0	9	0
Total			98	19	3	0	0	0	3	4	104	23

== Honours ==
Aceh United

- Liga 3 third place: 2018

Persiraja

- Liga 2 third place (play-offs): 2019

Persis Solo

- Liga 2: 2021

Individual

- Liga 3 Best Player: 2017
- Menpora Cup Top Scorer: 2021
- Menpora Cup Best Eleven: 2021
