= Ikhwani =

Indonesian footballer

Personal information
- Full name: Ikhwani Hasanuddin
- Date of birth: June 7, 1986 (age 40)
- Place of birth: Takengon, Aceh, Indonesia
- Height: 1.68 m (5 ft 6 in)
- Position: Full-back

Senior career*
Years	Team	Apps	(Gls)
2010–2013	PSAP Sigli	33	(0)
2013–2015	Gresik United	10	(0)
2016	Persiraja Banda Aceh	12	(0)
2017–2018	Aceh United	21	(0)
2019	Persiraja Banda Aceh	18	(0)
2020	PSMS Medan	1	(0)
- * Club domestic league appearances and goals ‡ National team caps and goals as of 17 May 2019

Ikhwani Hasanuddin (born 7 June 1986) is an Indonesian professional footballer who plays as a full-back.

== Career ==
He started his professional career at PSAP Sigli, when he played for the club in Indonesian Premier League and Indonesian Super League. In 2013, he moved to Gresik United to play in Indonesian Super League. He then signed for Persiraja Banda Aceh to compete in 2016 ISC B and in Liga 2. In 2018, he is playing for the newly promoted club Aceh United.

== Honours ==
=== Club ===
Persiraja Banda Aceh

- Liga 2 third Place (play-offs): 2019
