= Firly =

Firly is an Indonesian name. Notable people with the name include:

- Firly Apriansyah (born 1986), Indonesian footballer
- Muhamad Firly (born 1999), Indonesian footballer
