= Ilham Fathoni =

Indonesian footballer

Personal information
- Full name: Ilham Fathoni
- Date of birth: 31 December 1997 (age 28)
- Place of birth: Kampar, Indonesia
- Height: 1.73 m (5 ft 8 in)
- Positions: Attacking midfielder; forward

Team information
- Current team: PSPS Pekanbaru
- Number: 97

Youth career
- 2010–2015: SSB Batu Bersurat
- 2015: Rumbai FC
- 2016–2017: PS UIR

Senior career*
Years	Team	Apps	(Gls)
2018	PSPS Riau	4	(0)
2019	PSMS Medan	22	(9)
2020	Sulut United	1	(0)
2021	PSMS Medan	10	(1)
2022	Persela Lamongan	10	(0)
2022	Persis Solo	1	(0)
2022	→ Nusantara United (loan)	6	(0)
2023–	PSPS Pekanbaru	43	(13)
- * Club domestic league appearances and goals as of 2 May 2026

Ilham Fathoni (born 31 December 1997) is an Indonesian professional footballer who plays as an attacking midfielder or forward for Liga 2 club PSPS Pekanbaru.

== Club career ==
=== Sulut United ===
Fathoni signed with Sulut United to play in the Indonesian Liga 2 for the 2020 season. This season was suspended on 27 March 2020 due to the COVID-19 pandemic. The season was abandoned and was declared void on 20 January 2021.

=== Return to PSMS Medan ===
In 2021, Fathoni signed a contract with Indonesian Liga 2 club PSMS Medan. He made his league debut on 7 October 2021 in a match against KS Tiga Naga at the Gelora Sriwijaya Stadium, Palembang.

=== Persela Lamongan ===
He was signed for Persela Lamongan to play in Liga 1 in the 2021 season. Fathoni made his league debut on 6 January 2022 in a match against Persipura Jayapura at the Kapten I Wayan Dipta Stadium, Gianyar.

=== Persis Solo ===
Fathoni was signed for Persis Solo to play in Liga 1 in the 2022–23 season. He made his league debut on 7 August 2022 in a match against Persikabo 1973 at the Pakansari Stadium, Cibinong.

== Career statistics ==
=== Club ===
As of 2 May 2026.

Club	Season	League			Domestic Cup		Continental		Other		Total	
Club	Season	Division	Apps	Goals	Apps	Goals	Apps	Goals	Apps	Goals	Apps	Goals
PSPS Riau	2018	Liga 2	4	0	0	0	–		0	0	4	0
PSMS Medan	2019	Liga 2	22	9	0	0	–		0	0	22	9
Sulut United	2020	Liga 2	1	0	0	0	–		0	0	1	0
PSMS Medan	2021	Liga 2	10	1	0	0	–		0	0	10	1
Persela Lamongan	2021–22	Liga 1	10	0	0	0	–		0	0	10	0
Persis Solo	2022–23	Liga 1	1	0	0	0	–		1 (Note: Appearances in Indonesia President's Cup)	0	2	0
Nusantara United	2022–23	Liga 2	6	0	0	0	–		0	0	6	0
PSPS Riau	2023–24	Liga 2	3	1	0	0	–		0	0	3	1
PSPS Riau	2024–25	Liga 2	22	8	0	0	–		0	0	22	8
PSPS Riau	2025–26	Liga 2	18	4	0	0	–		0	0	18	4
Career total			97	23	0	0	0	0	1	0	98	23
