= Reza Kusuma =

Indonesian footballer

Personal information
- Full name: Muhammad Reza Kusuma
- Date of birth: 7 February 2000 (age 26)
- Place of birth: Jakarta, Indonesia
- Height: 1.71 m (5 ft 7 in)
- Position: Central midfielder

Team information
- Current team: PSPS Pekanbaru (on loan from Bhayangkara Presisi)
- Number: 14

Youth career
- MC Utama
- Vamos Indonesia

Senior career*
Years	Team	Apps	(Gls)
2019–2020	Cristo Atlético	2	(0)
2020–2021	HNK Primorac	17	(2)
2021	Mitra Kukar	8	(0)
2022–	Bhayangkara	39	(0)
2026–	→ PSPS Pekanbaru (loan)	14	(0)
- * Club domestic league appearances and goals as of 11 September 2026

Muhammad Reza Kusuma (born 7 February 2000) is an Indonesian professional footballer who plays as a central midfielder for Championship club PSPS Pekanbaru, on loan from Bhayangkara Presisi.

== Club career ==
=== HNK Primorac ===
In 2020, Reza joined HNK Primorac. Reza Kusuma made his debut with HNK Primorac on March 20, 2021, against NK OSK in week 17. HNK Primorac is a team playing in the South Zone Croatian League 3. Recently, Reza managed to gain a positive note with HNK Primorac. He was selected in the list of Team of The Week (11 players) week 20 Croatian League 3. That he got after scoring one goal in the match against NK Kamen Podbablje. This is not the first time Reza has competed in European football. Previously, he had already joined Tercera División club Cristo Atlético.

=== Bhayangkara ===
He was signed for Bhayangkara to play in Liga 1 in the 2022 season. Reza made his league debut on 8 September 2022 in a match against Madura United at the Gelora Ratu Pamelingan Stadium, Pamekasan.

== Career statistics ==
=== Club ===
As of 11 September 2026.

Club	Season	League			Cup		Continental		Other		Total	
Club	Season	Division	Apps	Goals	Apps	Goals	Apps	Goals	Apps	Goals	Apps	Goals
Cristo Atlético	2019–20	Tercera Federación	2	0	0	0	0	0	0	0	2	0
HNK Primorac	2020–21	3. NL	17	2	0	0	0	0	0	0	17	2
Mitra Kukar	2021	Liga 2	8	0	0	0	0	0	0	0	8	0
Bhayangkara	2022–23	Liga 1	3	0	0	0	0	0	0	0	3	0
Bhayangkara	2023–24	Liga 1	25	0	0	0	–		0	0	25	0
Bhayangkara	2024–25	Liga 2	11	0	0	0	–		0	0	11	0
Bhayangkara	2025–26	Liga 1	0	0	0	0	–		0	0	0	0
PSPS Pekanbaru (loan)	2025–26	Championship	13	0	0	0	0	0	0	0	13	0
PSPS Pekanbaru (loan)	2026–27	Championship	1	0	0	0	0	0	0	0	1	0
Career total			80	2	0	0	0	0	0	0	80	2

== Honours ==
Bhayangkara

- Liga 2 runner-up: 2024–25
