= Risna Prahalabenta =

Indonesian footballer

Personal information
- Full name: Risna Prahalabenta Ranggalelana
- Date of birth: 9 April 1997 (age 29)
- Place of birth: Kediri, Indonesia
- Height: 1.79 m (5 ft 10 in)
- Position: Defender

Team information
- Current team: Persibat Batang

Youth career
- 2015–2016: Persedikab Kediri

Senior career*
Years	Team	Apps	(Gls)
2017–2019	Persik Kediri	28	(3)
2018	→ Persekat Tegal (loan)	10	(0)
2020	Madura United	1	(0)
2021–2022	Persik Kediri	28	(1)
2022	Dewa United	8	(0)
2023	Barito Putera	1	(0)
2023	Nusantara United	7	(0)
2023–2024	Semen Padang	10	(0)
2024–2025	Persela Lamongan	6	(0)
2025	Kendal Tornado	4	(0)
2026	Persiraja Banda Aceh	5	(0)
2026–	Persibat Batang	0	(0)
- * Club domestic league appearances and goals as of 2 May 2026

Risna Prahalabenta Ranggalelana (born 9 April 1997) is an Indonesian professional footballer who plays as a defender for Liga 4 club Persibat Batang.

== Club career ==
=== Persik Kediri ===
In 2017 Risna Prahalabenta joined Persik Kediri in the Liga 2. On 25 November 2019 Persik successfully won the 2019 Liga 2 Final and promoted to Liga 1, after defeated Persita Tangerang 3–2 at the Kapten I Wayan Dipta Stadium, Gianyar.

==== Persekat Tegal (loan) ====
He was signed for Persekat Tegal to play in Liga 3 Regional route: Central Java in the 2018 season, on loan from Persik Kediri.

=== Madura United ===
In 2020 Risna signed with Madura United for the 2020 Liga 1 (Indonesia). He made his league debut on 29 February 2020, in a 4–0 win against Barito Putera as substitute at the Gelora Madura Stadium, Pamekasan. Then this season was suspended on 27 March 2020 due to the COVID-19 pandemic. The season was abandoned and was declared void on 20 January 2021.

=== Return to Persik Kediri ===
On 23 April 2021, it was confirmed that Risna would re-join Persik Kediri, signing a year contract. He made his league debut on 27 August 2021, in a 1–0 loss against Bali United as substitute at the Gelora Bung Karno Stadium, Jakarta.

=== Dewa United ===
Risna was signed for Dewa United to play in Liga 1 in the 2022–23 season. He made his league debut on 25 July 2022 in a match against Persis Solo at the Moch. Soebroto Stadium, Magelang.

== Honours ==
=== Club ===
Persik Kediri

- Liga 2: 2019
- Liga 3: 2018

Semen Padang

- Liga 2 runner-up: 2023–24
