= Kevy Syahertian =

Indonesian footballer

Personal information
- Full name: Mochammad Kevy Syahertian
- Date of birth: 23 June 1999 (age 27)
- Place of birth: Malang, Indonesia
- Height: 1.64 m (5 ft 5 in)
- Position: Winger

Team information
- Current team: Persekat Tegal
- Number: 19

Youth career
- SSB Malang
- 2016: Persid Jember
- 2017–2018: Madura United

Senior career*
Years	Team	Apps	(Gls)
2018	Martapura	0	(0)
2018–2019	Persinga Ngawi	0	(0)
2019–2023	Madura United	31	(1)
2023	→ RANS Nusantara (loan)	11	(1)
2023–2024	Persikab Bandung	16	(4)
2024–2025	Adhyaksa	3	(0)
2025–	Persekat Tegal	24	(2)
- * Club domestic league appearances and goals as of 8 May 2026

Mochammad Kevy Syahertian (born 23 June 1999) is an Indonesian professional footballer who plays as a winger for Liga 2 club Persekat Tegal.

== Club career ==
=== Madura United ===
Syahertian was signed for Madura United to play in Liga 1 in the 2019 season. He made his debut in the Liga 1 on 8 November 2019, against Arema where he played as a substitute.

==== Loan to RANS Nusantara ====
He was signed for RANS Nusantara to play in Liga 1 in the 2022–23 season, on loan from Madura United. Kevy made his debut on 16 January 2023 in a match against PSIS Semarang at the Pakansari Stadium, Cibinong.

== Career statistics ==
=== Club ===
As of match played 8 May 2026

Club	Season	League			Cup		Other		Total	
Club	Season	Division	Apps	Goals	Apps	Goals	Apps	Goals	Apps	Goals
Madura United	2019	Liga 1	3	0	0	0	0	0	3	0
Madura United	2020	Liga 1	1	0	0	0	0	0	1	0
Madura United	2021	Liga 1	25	1	0	0	4 (Note: Appearances in Menpora Cup)	1	29	2
Madura United	2022–23	Liga 1	0	0	0	0	0	0	0	0
Madura United	2023–24	Liga 1	2	0	0	0	0	0	2	0
RANS Nusantara (loan)	2022–23	Liga 1	11	1	0	0	0	0	11	1
Persikab Bandung	2023–24	Liga 2	16	4	0	0	0	0	16	4
Adhyaksa	2024–25	Liga 2	3	0	0	0	0	0	3	0
Persekat Tegal	2025–26	Liga 2	24	2	0	0	0	0	24	2
Career total			84	8	0	0	4	1	88	9
