= Ocvian Chanigio =

Indonesian footballer

Personal information
- Full name: Ocvian Chanigio
- Date of birth: 16 October 1999 (age 27)
- Place of birth: Temanggung, Indonesia
- Height: 1.71 m (5 ft 7 in)
- Position: Attacking midfielder

Youth career
- 2017: Persela Lamongan
- 2018: Bali United

Senior career*
Years	Team	Apps	(Gls)
2019	Persitema Temanggung	8	(1)
2019–2022	PSS Sleman	30	(2)
2022	PSIM Yogyakarta	3	(0)
2023–2024	Semen Padang	18	(0)
2024–2025	Persela Lamongan	15	(0)
2026	PSIS Semarang	8	(0)
- * Club domestic league appearances and goals as of 3 May 2026

Ocvian Chanigio (born 16 October 1999) is an Indonesian professional footballer who plays as an attacking midfielder.

== Club career ==
=== PSS Sleman ===
He was signed for PSS Sleman to play in Liga 1. Chanigio made his debut on 4 October 2019 in a match against Bhayangkara. On 3 December 2019, Chanigio scored his first goal for PSS against Badak Lampung in the 56th minute at the Maguwoharjo Stadium, Sleman.

=== PSIM Yogyakarta ===
Chanigio was signed for PSIM Yogyakarta to play in Liga 2 in the 2022–23 season.

== Career statistics ==
=== Club ===
As of 3 May 2026

Club	Season	League			Cup		Continental		Other		Total	
Club	Season	Division	Apps	Goals	Apps	Goals	Apps	Goals	Apps	Goals	Apps	Goals
PSS Sleman	2019	Liga 1	9	2	0	0	–		0	0	9	2
PSS Sleman	2020	Liga 1	2	0	0	0	–		0	0	2	0
PSS Sleman	2021	Liga 1	19	0	0	0	–		1 (Note: Appearances in Menpora Cup.)	0	20	0
PSS Sleman	Total		30	2	0	0	–		1	0	31	2
PSIM Yogyakarta	2022–23	Liga 2	3	0	0	0	–		0	0	3	0
Semen Padang	2023–24	Liga 2	18	0	0	0	–		0	0	18	0
Persela Lamongan	2024–25	Liga 2	12	0	0	0	–		0	0	12	0
Persela Lamongan	2025–26	Championship	3	0	0	0	–		0	0	3	0
PSIS Semarang	2025–26	Championship	8	0	0	0	–		0	0	8	0
Career total			74	2	0	0	0	0	1	0	75	2

== Honours ==
=== Club ===
PSS Sleman

- Menpora Cup third place: 2021

Semen Padang

- Liga 2 runner-up: 2023–24
