= 2021 Menpora Cup =

Piala Menpora

Tournament details
- Country: Indonesia
- Venue(s): Surakarta, Malang, Bandung, and Sleman
- Dates: 21 March – 25 April 2021
- Teams: 17

Final positions
- Champions: Persija
- Runners-up: Persib
- Third place: PSS
- Fourth place: PSM

Tournament statistics
- Matches played: 39
- Goals scored: 96 (2.46 per match)
- Top goal scorer(s): Assanur Rijal (4 goals)

Awards
- Best player: Marc Klok
- Goals scored in penalty shoot-outs are not included.

The 2021 Menpora Cup (Indonesian: Piala Menpora 2021) was a pre-season tournament held by the PSSI ahead of the 2021 Liga 1. The tournament started on 21 March and finished with a two-legged final on 22 and 25 April 2021. Due to the COVID-19 pandemic, all matches were played behind closed doors. The 2021 edition was the second edition of Menpora Cup, with the first edition being held in 2013 which was won by Arema who defeated Australian side Central Coast Mariners by 2–1 in the final.

Persija won the finals 4–1 on aggregate against Persib for the title.

== Teams ==
PT Liga Indonesia Baru (LIB) decided that only 18 teams that participated in the 2020 Liga 1 could join this tournament. Previously, two Liga 2 teams, PSMS and Sriwijaya, were invited. However, their participation was canceled after PT LIB held a virtual meeting. Persipura decided not to take part in the tournament which led to only 17 teams participating.

== Draw ==
The draw of the tournament was held on 8 March 2021. Eighteen teams were divided into four groups, the first two groups contain five teams, while the rest contain only four teams. Four teams, Persija, Persib, Arema, and Persebaya, were distributed to separate groups to ensure they do not meet each other in order to mitigate security risks from travelling fans of these rivalling teams. The draw resulted in the following groups:

Group A
Pos	Team
A1	Arema
A2	PSIS
A3	Barito Putera
A4	Persikabo 1973
A5	~~Persipura~~

Group B
Pos	Team
B1	Persija
B2	Bhayangkara Solo
B3	Borneo
B4	PSM

Group C
Pos	Team
C1	Persebaya
C2	Persik
C3	Persela
C4	PSS
C5	Madura United

Group D
Pos	Team
D1	Persib
D2	Persiraja
D3	Persita
D4	Bali United

== Venues ==
Four venues in four cities on Java Island were selected for the tournament.

2021 Menpora Cup Venues
Surakarta	Malang	Bandung	Sleman
Manahan Stadium	Kanjuruhan Stadium	Jalak Harupat Stadium	Maguwoharjo Stadium
Capacity: 20,000	Capacity: 42,449	Capacity: 27,000	Capacity: 31,700

== Regulations ==
The regulations were as follows:

- Each team might register 30 players and did not require bringing all players to the stadium.
- Teams must register three goalkeepers.
- Player registration started on 9 March 2021 until one day before of each group's first match.
- Each team allowed to register four foreign players, including one slot for a player from AFC countries.
- Teams could only register a maximum of 10 officials with eight people allowed to sit on the bench.
- Each match was held for 90 minutes by adding a cooling break in the 30th and 75th minutes. The duration of the cooling break was 3 minutes and would be added to the extra time at the end of each round.
- Each team was allowed to substitute a maximum of six players on three occasions.
- There were additional substitutions when entering the knock-out stage. When the match was drawn for up to 90 minutes, then in the extra round, each team was allowed to add one substitution.

== Group stage ==
The top two teams of each group advanced to the quarter-finals.

All times were local, WIB (UTC+7).

=== Group A ===
Pos	Team	Pld	W	D	L	GF	GA	GD	Pts	Qualification
1	PSIS	3	2	1	0	9	6	+3	7	Knockout stage
2	Barito Putera	3	1	2	0	7	6	+1	5	Knockout stage
3	Persikabo 1973	3	0	2	1	4	6	−2	2	
4	Arema	3	0	1	2	4	6	−2	1	
5	Persipura	0	0	0	0	0	0	0	0	Withdrawn

Source: Piala Menpora
Rules for classification: 1) Points; 2) Head-to-head; 3) Goal difference; 4) Goals scored; 5) Fair-play points; 6) Draw.
21 March 2021
15:15

Arema	1–1	Persikabo 1973
Dendi 82'	Report	Dani 11'

Manahan Stadium, Surakarta
Referee: Aprisman Aranda
21 March 2021
18:15

PSIS	3–3	Barito Putera
Fandi 32'; Hari 34'; Komarodin 40'	Report	Bissa 48'; Bayu 83'; Rizky 90+4'

Manahan Stadium, Surakarta
Referee: Thoriq Alkatiri

25 March 2021
15:15

Persikabo 1973	1–3	PSIS
Firza 90'	Report	Farrel 21'; Fandi 26'; Arhan 82' (pen.)

Manahan Stadium, Surakarta
Referee: Darma Santoso Gulo
25 March 2021
18:15

Barito Putera	2–1	Arema
Alif 11'; Beni 24'	Report	Feby 54'

Manahan Stadium, Surakarta
Referee: Moch. Adung

30 March 2021
15:15

Barito Putera	2–2	Persikabo 1973
Cássio 49'; Firly 87'	Report	Dani 37'; Andy 50'

Manahan Stadium, Surakarta
Referee: Agus Fauzan Arifin
30 March 2021
18:15

Arema	2–3	PSIS
Dedik 9', 67' (pen.)	Report	Komarodin 45+6'; Arhan 62'; Riyan 90'

Manahan Stadium, Surakarta
Referee: Steven Yubel Poli

=== Group B ===
Pos	Team	Pld	W	D	L	GF	GA	GD	Pts	Qualification
1	Persija	3	2	0	1	6	3	+3	6	Knockout stage
2	PSM	3	1	2	0	5	3	+2	5	Knockout stage
3	Bhayangkara Solo	3	1	1	1	3	3	0	4	
4	Borneo	3	0	1	2	2	7	−5	1	

Source: Piala Menpora
Rules for classification: 1) Points; 2) Head-to-head; 3) Goal difference; 4) Goals scored; 5) Fair-play points; 6) Draw.
22 March 2021
15:15

Bhayangkara Solo	1–0	Borneo
Alsan 3'	Report

Kanjuruhan Stadium, Malang
Referee: Fariq Hitaba
22 March 2021
18:15

Persija	0–2	PSM
	Report	Wanggai 45+2'; Yakob 68'

Kanjuruhan Stadium, Malang
Referee: Rully Ruslin Tambuntina

27 March 2021
15:15

PSM	1–1	Bhayangkara Solo
Yakob 49'	Report	Arthur 8'

Kanjuruhan Stadium, Malang
Referee: Iwan Sukoco
27 March 2021
18:15

Borneo	0–4	Persija
	Report	M. Motta 45+4'; Osvaldo 50'; Y. Motta 66'; Šimić 88'

Kanjuruhan Stadium, Malang
Referee: Hamim Tohari

31 March 2021
15:15

Borneo	2–2	PSM
Guy 31' (pen.); Rifal 64'	Report	Saldi 20'; Zulham 24'

Kanjuruhan Stadium, Malang
Referee: Asep Yandis
31 March 2021
18:15

Persija	2–1	Bhayangkara Solo
Osvaldo 53'; Klok 79'	Report	N'Douassel 27'

Kanjuruhan Stadium, Malang
Referee: Yeni Krisdianto

=== Group C ===
Pos	Team	Pld	W	D	L	GF	GA	GD	Pts	Qualification
1	PSS	4	2	1	1	3	2	+1	7 (Note: Head-to-head points: PSS 3, Persebaya 0.)	Knockout stage
2	Persebaya	4	2	1	1	4	3	+1	7	Knockout stage
3	Persik	4	1	1	2	5	6	−1	4 (Note: Head-to-head points: Persik 4, Persela 2, Madura United 1.)	
4	Persela	4	0	4	0	3	3	0	4	
5	Madura United	4	1	1	2	5	6	−1	4	

Source: Piala Menpora
Rules for classification: 1) Points; 2) Head-to-head; 3) Goal difference; 4) Goals scored; 5) Fair-play points; 6) Draw.
Notes:
23 March 2021
15:15

Madura United	2–1	PSS
Kevy 67'; Jaime 88'	Report	Irfan J. 19'

Jalak Harupat Stadium, Bandung
Referee: Yudi Nurcahya
23 March 2021
18:15

Persebaya	2–1	Persik
Samsul 67' (pen.), 71' (pen.)	Report	Andri 63' (pen.)

Jalak Harupat Stadium, Bandung
Referee: Agus Fauzan

28 March 2021
15:15

PSS	0–0	Persela
	Report

Jalak Harupat Stadium, Bandung
Referee: Ginanjar Rahman Latief
28 March 2021
18:15

Madura United	1–2	Persebaya
Slamet 47'	Report	Ady 11'; Rendi 72'

Jalak Harupat Stadium, Bandung
Referee: Musthofa Umarella

1 April 2021
15:15

Persik	0–1	PSS
	Report	Vélez 10'

Jalak Harupat Stadium, Bandung
Referee: Nendi Rohaendi
1 April 2021
18:15

Persela	1–1	Madura United
Akbar 26'	Report	Bruno 23'

Jalak Harupat Stadium, Bandung
Referee: Abdullah

3 April 2021
15:15

Persik	2–1	Madura United
Andri 71' (pen.); Antony 79'	Report	Beto 51' (pen.)

Jalak Harupat Stadium, Bandung
Referee: Thoriq Alkatiri
3 April 2021
18:15

Persebaya	0–0	Persela
	Report

Jalak Harupat Stadium, Bandung
Referee: Darma Santoso Gulo

7 April 2021
15:15

Persela	2–2	Persik
Lorenzen 19' (pen.), 23'	Report	Yusuf 13'; Andri 85' (pen.)

Jalak Harupat Stadium, Bandung
Referee: Gedion. F. Dapaherang
7 April 2021
18:15

PSS	1–0	Persebaya
Irfan B. 47' (pen.)	Report

Jalak Harupat Stadium, Bandung
Referee: Yudi Nurcahya

=== Group D ===
Pos	Team	Pld	W	D	L	GF	GA	GD	Pts	Qualification
1	Persib	3	2	1	0	6	3	+3	7	Knockout stage
2	Bali United	3	1	2	0	4	2	+2	5	Knockout stage
3	Persiraja	3	1	0	2	4	5	−1	3	
4	Persita	3	0	1	2	3	7	−4	1	

Source: Piala Menpora
Rules for classification: 1) Points; 2) Head-to-head; 3) Goal difference; 4) Goals scored; 5) Fair-play points; 6) Draw.
24 March 2021
15:15

Persiraja	3–1	Persita
Assanur 33', 36', 45'	Report	Chandra 54'

Maguwoharjo Stadium, Sleman
Referee: Nusur Fadilah
24 March 2021
18:15

Persib	1–1	Bali United
Frets 89'	Report	Willian 52'

Maguwoharjo Stadium, Sleman
Referee: Yeni Krisdianto

29 March 2021
15:15

Bali United	2–0	Persiraja
Spasojević 12'; Rizky 19'	Report

Maguwoharjo Stadium, Sleman
Referee: Annas Apriliandi
29 March 2021
18:15

Persita	1–3	Persib
Chandra 45+1' (pen.)	Report	Vizcarra 16'; Frets 36'; Walian 63'

Maguwoharjo Stadium, Sleman
Referee: Sance Lawita

2 April 2021
15:15

Persita	1–1	Bali United
Taufiq 55'	Report	Spasojević 14'

Maguwoharjo Stadium, Sleman
Referee: Dwi Purba
2 April 2021
18:15

Persib	2–1	Persiraja
Wander Luiz 25'; Sinaga 90+3'	Report	Assanur 90'

Maguwoharjo Stadium, Sleman
Referee: Aprisman Aranda

== Knockout stage ==
In the quarter-finals, extra time would not be played, and a match would go straight to a penalty shoot-out to determine the winner. In the semi-finals and finals, the away goals rule would not be applied, and a penalty shoot-out would be used if necessary (no extra time was also played).

All times were local, WIB (UTC+7).

=== Bracket ===
Quarter-finals
9 April – Malang
PSIS	0 (2)
PSM (p)	0 (4)
10 April – Malang
Persija	1
Barito Putera	0
11 April – Sleman
Persib	3
Persebaya	2
12 April – Bandung
PSS (p)	0 (4)
Bali United	0 (2)

Semi-finals
15/18 April
PSM	0	0	0 (3)
Persija (p)	0	0	0 (4)
16/19 April
Persib	2	1	3
PSS	1	1	2

Finals
22/25 April
Persija	2	2	4
Persib	0	1	1
Third place
24 April – Surakarta
PSM	1
PSS	2

=== Quarter-finals ===
9 April 2021
18:15

PSIS	0–0	PSM
	Report
Penalties
Arhan (penalty missed); Hari (penalty missed); Dewa (penalty scored); Fredyan (penalty scored)	2–4	(penalty scored) Hasyim; (penalty scored) Rasyid; (penalty scored) Abdul Rachman; (penalty scored) Sutanto

Kanjuruhan Stadium, Malang
Referee: Abdullah

10 April 2021
18:15

Persija	1–0	Barito Putera
Šimić 61'	Report

Kanjuruhan Stadium, Malang
Referee: Steven Yubel Poli

11 April 2021
18:15

Persib	3–2	Persebaya
Walian 1'; Wander Luiz 6'; Kuipers 37'	Report	Arif 62'; Syaifuddin 90+3'

Maguwoharjo Stadium, Sleman
Referee: Agus Fauzan Arifin

12 April 2021
20:30

PSS	0–0	Bali United
	Report
Penalties
Irfan J. (penalty scored); Kurniawan (penalty scored); Fabiano (penalty scored); Wahyu (penalty scored)	4–2	(penalty scored) Lilipaly; (penalty scored) Lerby; (penalty missed) Dias; (penalty missed) Willian

Jalak Harupat Stadium, Bandung
Referee: Nusur Fadilah

=== Semi-finals ===
15 April 2021
20:30

PSM	0–0	Persija
	Report

Maguwoharjo Stadium, Sleman
Referee: Hamim Tohari
18 April 2021
20:30

Persija	0–0	PSM
	Report
Penalties
Šimić (penalty missed); Chand (penalty scored); Y. Motta (penalty scored); Novri (penalty missed); Klok (penalty scored); Sandi (penalty missed); Riko (penalty missed); Tony (penalty scored)	4–3	(penalty scored) Hasyim; (penalty scored) Rasyid; (penalty missed) Abdul Rachman; (penalty scored) Sutanto; (penalty missed) Sayuri; (penalty missed) Zulham; (penalty missed) Saldi; (penalty missed) Zulkifli

Manahan Stadium, Surakarta
Referee: Aprisman Aranda

0–0 on aggregate. Persija won 4–3 on penalties.

16 April 2021
20:30

Persib	2–1	PSS
Igbonefo 23'; Frets 90+1'	Report	Saddam 20'

Maguwoharjo Stadium, Sleman
Referee: Iwan Sukoco
19 April 2021
20:30

PSS	1–1	Persib
Saddam 73'	Report	Walian 84'

Manahan Stadium, Surakarta
Referee: Darma Santoso Gulo

Persib won 3–2 on aggregate.

=== Third place ===
24 April 2021
20:30

PSM	1–2	PSS
Sutanto 59'	Report	Irfan J. 34' (pen.); Irkham 65'

Manahan Stadium, Surakarta
Referee: Thoriq Alkatiri

=== Finals ===
22 April 2021
20:30

Persija	2–0	Persib
Braif 1'; Taufik 7'	Report

Maguwoharjo Stadium, Sleman
Referee: Fariq Hitaba
25 April 2021
20:30

Persib	1–2	Persija
Sinaga 84'	Report	Osvaldo 51'; Riko 90+1'

Manahan Stadium, Surakarta
Referee: Agus Fauzan Arifin

Persija won 4–1 on aggregate.

== Goalscorers ==
There were 96 goals scored in 39 matches, for an average of 2.46 goals per match.

4 goals

- (Indonesia) Assanur Rijal

3 goals

- (Indonesia) Andri Ibo
- (Indonesia) Ezra Walian
- (Indonesia) Frets Butuan
- (Indonesia) Osvaldo Haay

2 goals

- (Brazil) Wander Luiz
- (Croatia) Marko Šimić
- (Indonesia) Ahmad Nufiandani
- (Indonesia) Chandra Waskito
- (Indonesia) Dedik Setiawan
- (Indonesia) Fandi Eko Utomo
- (Indonesia) Ferdinand Sinaga
- (Indonesia) Ilija Spasojević
- (Indonesia) Irfan Jaya
- (Indonesia) Komarodin
- (Indonesia) Pratama Arhan
- (Indonesia) Saddam Gaffar
- (Indonesia) Samsul Arif
- (Indonesia) Yakob Sayuri
- (Uganda) Melvyn Lorenzen

1 goal

- (Argentina) Nicolás Vélez
- (Brazil) Bruno Lopes
- (Brazil) Cássio de Jesus
- (Brazil) Jaime Xavier
- (Brazil) Willian Pacheco
- (Brazil) Yann Motta
- (Chad) Ezechiel N'Douassel
- (Indonesia) Ady Setiawan
- (Indonesia) Akbar
- (Indonesia) Beto Gonçalves
- (Indonesia) Alif Jaelani
- (Indonesia) Alsan Sanda
- (Indonesia) Andy Setyo
- (Indonesia) Antony Nugroho
- (Indonesia) Arif Satria
- (Indonesia) Arthur Barrios Bonai
- (Indonesia) Bayu Pradana
- (Indonesia) Beni Oktovianto
- (Indonesia) Braif Fatari
- (Indonesia) Dendi Santoso
- (Indonesia) Esteban Vizcarra
- (Indonesia) Farrel Arya
- (Indonesia) Feby Eka Putra
- (Indonesia) Firza Andika
- (Indonesia) Guy Junior Ondoua
- (Indonesia) Hari Nur Yulianto
- (Indonesia) Irfan Bachdim
- (Indonesia) Irkham Zahrul Mila
- (Indonesia) Kevy Syahertian
- (Indonesia) Marc Klok
- (Indonesia) Mokhamad Syaifuddin
- (Indonesia) Muhamad Firly
- (Indonesia) Patrich Wanggai
- (Indonesia) Rendi Irwan
- (Indonesia) Rifal Lastori
- (Indonesia) Riko Simanjuntak
- (Indonesia) Riyan Ardiansyah
- (Indonesia) Rizky Pellu
- (Indonesia) Rizky Pora
- (Indonesia) Saldi Amiruddin
- (Indonesia) Slamet Nurcahyono
- (Indonesia) Sutanto Tan
- (Indonesia) Taufik Hidayat
- (Indonesia) Taufiq Febriyanto
- (Indonesia) Victor Igbonefo
- (Indonesia) Yusuf Fuad
- (Indonesia) Zulham Zamrun
- (Italy) Marco Motta
- (Ivory Coast) Donald Bissa
- (Netherlands) Nick Kuipers

== Awards ==
- Best referee was awarded to Agus Fauzan Arifin.
- The top scorer was Assanur Rijal (Persiraja) with four goals.
- The young player was Pratama Arhan (PSIS).
- The best player was Marc Klok (Persija).
- PSM won the fair play award.
- The Best XI consisted of the following:

Goalkeeper	Defenders	Midfielders	Forwards
(Indonesia) Andritany Ardhiyasa (Persija)	(Indonesia) Pratama Arhan (PSIS) (Indonesia) Andri Ibo (Persik) (Indonesia) Victor Igbonefo (Persib) (Italy) Marco Motta (Persija)	(Indonesia) Kim Kurniawan (PSS) (Nepal) Rohit Chand (Persija) (Indonesia) Marc Klok (Persija)	(Indonesia) Osvaldo Haay (Persija) (Indonesia) Assanur Rijal (Persiraja) (Indonesia) Ezra Walian (Persib)

== Tournament team rankings ==
As per statistical convention in football, matches decided in extra time were counted as wins and losses, while matches decided by penalty shoot-outs were counted as draws.

Pos	Grp	Team	Pld	W	D	L	GF	GA	GD	Pts	Final result
1	B	Persija	8	5	2	1	11	4	+7	17	Champion
2	D	Persib	8	4	2	2	13	11	+2	14	Runner-up
3	C	PSS	8	3	3	2	7	6	+1	12	Third place
4	B	PSM	7	1	5	1	6	5	+1	8	Fourth place
5	A	PSIS	4	2	2	0	9	6	+3	8	Eliminated in the quarter-finals
6	C	Persebaya	5	2	1	2	6	6	0	7	Eliminated in the quarter-finals
7	D	Bali United	4	1	3	0	4	2	+2	6	Eliminated in the quarter-finals
8	A	Barito Putera	4	1	2	1	7	7	0	5	Eliminated in the quarter-finals
9	B	Bhayangkara Solo	3	1	1	1	3	3	0	4	Eliminated in the group stage
10	C	Persela	4	0	4	0	3	3	0	4	Eliminated in the group stage
11	C	Madura United	4	1	1	2	5	6	−1	4	Eliminated in the group stage
12	C	Persik	4	1	1	2	5	6	−1	4	Eliminated in the group stage
13	D	Persiraja	3	1	0	2	4	5	−1	3	Eliminated in the group stage
14	A	Persikabo 1973	3	0	2	1	4	6	−2	2	Eliminated in the group stage
15	A	Arema	3	0	1	2	4	6	−2	1	Eliminated in the group stage
16	D	Persita	3	0	1	2	3	7	−4	1	Eliminated in the group stage
17	B	Borneo	3	0	1	2	2	7	−5	1	Eliminated in the group stage
18	A	Persipura	0	0	0	0	0	0	0	0	Withdrew

Source: Group stage, Knockout stage
