= Aulia Ramadhan =

Indonesian footballer

Personal information
- Full name: Aulia Ramadhan Lubis
- Date of birth: 27 November 2003 (age 22)
- Place of birth: Medan, Indonesia
- Height: 1.65 m (5 ft 5 in)
- Position: Defensive midfielder

Team information
- Current team: PSPS Pekanbaru
- Number: 63

Youth career
- 2019: Badak Lampung
- 2021–2023: Persis Solo U20

Senior career*
Years	Team	Apps	(Gls)
2023–2024	Sada Sumut	14	(2)
2024–2025	PSPS Pekanbaru	21	(0)
2025–2026	Persik Kediri	0	(0)
2025–2026	→ Persikad Depok (loan)	21	(0)
2026–	PSPS Pekanbaru	3	(0)
- * Club domestic league appearances and goals as of 18 October 2026

Aulia Ramadhan Lubis (born 27 November 2003) is an Indonesian professional footballer who plays as a defensive midfielder for Championship club PSPS Pekanbaru.

== Club career ==
He began his career by joining Badak Lampung U-16 and U-18. The following year, he joined Persis Solo Youth, which would compete in the Elite Pro Academy. In the 2021 season, he was promoted to the first team.

=== Sada Sumut ===
On 7 August 2023, Ramadhan signed a contract with Sada Sumut. He made his professional debut on 10 September in a 0–2 away loss to Sriwijaya in Liga 2. On 8 October, he scored his first league goal from the penalty spot in a 2–1 home win over PSDS Deli Serdang.

=== PSPS Pekanbaru ===
On 2 July 2024, Ramadhan signed for PSPS Pekanbaru in Liga 2. He made his league debut on 7 September in a 3–1 home win against Persikabo 1973.

=== Persik Kediri ===
In June 2025, he signed with Super League side Persik Kediri.

==== Loan to Persikad Depok ====
In August 2025, he went out on loan to Persikad Depok in the Indonesian Championship. He made his league debut on 13 September in a 0–1 home loss to Sumsel United at Pakansari Stadium.
