= Taufiq Febriyanto =

Indonesian footballer

Personal information
- Full name: Taufiq Febriyanto
- Date of birth: 12 February 1997 (age 29)
- Place of birth: Sukoharjo, Indonesia
- Height: 1.65 m (5 ft 5 in)
- Position: Defensive midfielder

Youth career
- 2010: PPLP Jateng
- 2012: Pengcab Sukoharjo
- 2012: Akademi SB HRD Salatiga
- 2013: Puma Sukoharjo
- 2016: PPLM

Senior career*
Years	Team	Apps	(Gls)
2017	PS Bengkulu	5	(0)
2018	Persiwa Wamena	11	(0)
2018	PSS Sleman	8	(0)
2019	Persik Kediri	21	(0)
2020–2022	Persita Tangerang	24	(0)
2022–2024	Persis Solo	43	(0)
2024–2025	Bhayangkara	17	(0)
2025–2026	Kendal Tornado	6	(0)
- * Club domestic league appearances and goals as of 25 October 2025

Taufiq Febriyanto (born 12 February 1997) is an Indonesian professional footballer who plays as a defensive midfielder.

== Club career ==
=== Persik Kediri ===
In 2019 Taufiq joined Persik Kediri in the Liga 2. On 25 November 2019 Persik successfully won the 2019 Liga 2 Final and promoted to Liga 1, after defeated Persita Tangerang 3–2 at the Kapten I Wayan Dipta Stadium, Gianyar.

=== Persita Tangerang ===
He was signed for Persita Tangerang to play in Liga 1 in the 2020 season, this season was suspended on 27 March 2020 due to the COVID-19 pandemic. The season was abandoned and was declared void on 20 January 2021. Febriyanto made his debut on 28 August 2021 in a match against Persipura Jayapura at the Pakansari Stadium, Cibinong.

=== Persis Solo ===
Taufiq was signed for Persis Solo to play in Liga 1 in the 2022–23 season. He made his league debut on 25 July 2022 in a match against Dewa United at the Moch. Soebroto Stadium, Magelang.

== Career statistics ==
=== Club ===
As of 25 October 2025.

Club	Season	League			Cup		Continental		Other		Total	
Club	Season	Division	Apps	Goals	Apps	Goals	Apps	Goals	Apps	Goals	Apps	Goals
PS Bengkulu	2017	Liga 2	5	0	0	0	–		0	0	5	0
Persiwa Wamena	2018	Liga 2	11	0	0	0	–		0	0	11	0
PSS Sleman	2018	Liga 2	8	0	0	0	–		0	0	8	0
Persik Kediri	2019	Liga 2	21	0	0	0	–		0	0	21	0
Persita Tangerang	2020	Liga 1	0	0	0	0	–		0	0	0	0
Persita Tangerang	2021–22	Liga 1	24	0	0	0	–		2 (Note: Appearances in Menpora Cup)	1	26	1
Persis Solo	2022–23	Liga 1	24	0	0	0	–		2 (Note: Appearances in Indonesia President's Cup)	0	26	0
Persis Solo	2023–24	Liga 1	19	0	0	0	–		0	0	19	0
Bhayangkara	2024–25	Liga 2	17	0	0	0	–		0	0	17	0
Kendal Tornado	2025–26	Liga 2	6	0	0	0	–		0	0	6	0
Career total			135	0	0	0	0	0	4	1	139	1

== Honours ==
=== Club ===
PSS Sleman

- Liga 2: 2018

Persik Kediri

- Liga 2: 2019

Bhayangkara

- Liga 2 runner-up: 2024–25

=== Individual ===
- Liga 2 Best Player: 2019
