= Wahyu Sukarta =

Indonesian footballer

Personal information
- Full name: Wahyu Sukarta
- Date of birth: 12 June 1994 (age 32)
- Place of birth: Sleman, Indonesia
- Height: 1.72 m (5 ft 8 in)
- Position: Defensive midfielder

Team information
- Current team: Persikama Magelang
- Number: 10

Youth career
- 2005: Sleman Gold
- SSB HW
- 2015: PSS Tridadi
- FC UNY

Senior career*
Years	Team	Apps	(Gls)
2016–2023	PSS Sleman	56	(0)
2023–2025	Persipa Pati	29	(1)
2025–	Persikama Magelang	0	(0)
- * Club domestic league appearances and goals as of 21 February 2025

Wahyu Sukarta (born 12 June 1994) is an Indonesian professional footballer who plays as a defensive midfielder for Liga 4 club Persikama Magelang.

== Career statistics ==
=== Club ===
As of match played 21 February 2025

Club	Season	League			Cup (Note: Includes Piala Indonesia)		Other		Total	
Club	Season	Division	Apps	Goals	Apps	Goals	Apps	Goals	Apps	Goals
PSS Sleman	2016	ISC B	2	0	0	0	0	0	2	0
PSS Sleman	2017	Liga 2	10	0	0	0	0	0	10	0
PSS Sleman	2018	Liga 2	3	0	0	0	0	0	3	0
PSS Sleman	2019	Liga 1	17	0	0	0	3 (Note: Appearances in Indonesia President's Cup)	0	20	0
PSS Sleman	2020	Liga 1	3	0	0	0	0	0	3	0
PSS Sleman	2021–22	Liga 1	12	0	0	0	7 (Note: Appearances in Menpora Cup)	0	19	0
PSS Sleman	2022–23	Liga 1	9	0	0	0	4	0	13	0
Persipa Pati	2023–24	Liga 2	14	0	0	0	0	0	14	0
Persipa Pati	2024–25	Liga 2	15	1	0	0	0	0	15	1
Career total			84	1	0	0	14	0	98	1

== Honours ==
=== Club ===
PSS Sleman

- Liga 2: 2018
- Menpora Cup third place: 2021
