= Rangga Bolang =

Indonesian footballer (born 2007)

Personal information
- Full name: Rangga Bolang
- Date of birth: 21 May 2007 (age 19)
- Place of birth: North Maluku, Indonesia
- Height: 1.78 m (5 ft 10 in)
- Position: Centre-back

Team information
- Current team: Persiraja Banda Aceh (on loan from Java United)
- Number: 67

Youth career
- 2021–2023: SSB Latulua
- 2023: PSA Ambon
- 2024–2025: Malut United U18
- 2025–2026: Malut United U20

Senior career*
| Years | Team | Apps | (Gls) |
| 2026– | Java United | 0 | (0) |
| 2026– | → Persiraja Banda Aceh (loan) | 3 | (0) |
- * Club domestic league appearances and goals as of 3 October 2026

Rangga Bolang (born 21 May 2007) is an Indonesian professional footballer who plays as a centre-back for Championship club Persiraja Banda Aceh, on loan from Super League club Java United.

== Early career ==
Bolang began his football career with his local professional club, Malut United, at the youth academy.

== Club career ==
Bolang spent his development years with the youth academy of Malut United. During the 2025–26 Elite Pro Academy (EPA) Super League U20 season, he established himself as a key defensive figure and captained the Malut United U20 squad, leading them to finish the competition as runners-up. Throughout that youth campaign, he made 22 appearances, recording 50 interceptions, 56 clearances, and 28 tackles.

On 9 August 2026, Bolang officially signed his first senior professional contract by joining Championship side Persiraja Banda Aceh on loan from Super League club Java United (formerly known as Malut United) alongside his youth teammate Risky Safri to strengthen the team's defensive core for the 2026–27 season.

== International career ==
Following his consistent defensive displays in the youth league, Bolang received a national call-up from the PSSI on 25 November 2025. He was selected to participate in the Indonesia national under-20 football team selection program during the Talent ID Camp Batch 2.
