= Wiganda Pradika =

Indonesian footballer

Personal information
- Full name: Wiganda Pradika
- Date of birth: 3 December 1991 (age 34)
- Place of birth: Medan, Indonesia
- Height: 5 ft 8 in (1.72 m)
- Position: Right-back

Team information
- Current team: Persipal Palu
- Number: 3

Youth career
- PSMS Medan

Senior career*
Years	Team	Apps	(Gls)
2011–2013	PSMS Medan	28	(1)
2014	PS Kwarta Deli Serdang	14	(0)
2015–2016	PS TNI	32	(2)
2017–2019	Mitra Kukar	62	(1)
2020	Badak Lampung	1	(0)
2021	PSMS Medan	4	(0)
2022–2024	Semen Padang	24	(1)
2024	Persikota Tangerang	0	(0)
2025–	Persipal Palu	6	(0)
- * Club domestic league appearances and goals as of 12 November 2025

Wiganda Pradika (born 3 December 1991) is an Indonesian professional footballer who plays as a right-back for Persipal Palu.

== Club career ==
=== Badak Lampung ===
He was signed for Badak Lampung to play in Liga 2 in the 2020 season. This season was suspended on 27 March 2020 due to the COVID-19 pandemic. The season was abandoned and was declared void on 20 January 2021.

=== Semen Padang ===
Wiganda was signed for Semen Padang to play in Liga 2 in the 2022–23 season. He made his league debut on 29 August 2022 in a match against PSPS Riau at the Riau Main Stadium, Riau.

== Honours ==
Semen Padang

- Liga 2 runner-up: 2023–24
