= Ridha Umami =

Indonesian footballer (born 2000)

Personal information
- Full name: Ridha Umami
- Date of birth: 12 March 2000 (age 26)
- Place of birth: Lampeudeu Tunong, Pidie, Indonesia
- Height: 1.67 m (5 ft 6 in)
- Position: Midfielder

Team information
- Current team: Persiraja Banda Aceh
- Number: 19

Youth career
- 2016–2017: PSAP Sigli
- 2020–2021: PON Aceh

Senior career*
Years	Team	Apps	(Gls)
2019	Galacticos Bireuen		
2019	PSBL Langsa		
2021–2022	Persiraja Banda Aceh	12	(0)
2022	PSDS Deli Serdang	5	(0)
2023–	Persiraja Banda Aceh	29	(0)
- * Club domestic league appearances and goals as of 17 February 2025

Ridha Umami (born 12 March 2000) is an Indonesian professional footballer who plays as a midfielder for Liga 2 club Persiraja Banda Aceh.

== Club career ==
=== Persiraja Banda Aceh ===
He was signed for Persiraja Banda Aceh to play in the Liga 1 in the 2021 season. Ridha made his league debut on 7 January 2022 in a match against PSS Sleman at the Ngurah Rai Stadium, Denpasar.

== Career statistics ==
=== Club ===
As of 17 February 2025

Club	Season	League		Cup		Continental		Other		Total	
Club	Season	Apps	Goals	Apps	Goals	Apps	Goals	Apps	Goals	Apps	Goals
Persiraja Banda Aceh	2021	12	0	0	0	–		0	0	12	0
PSDS Deli Serdang	2022–23	5	0	0	0	–		0	0	5	0
Persiraja Banda Aceh	2023–24	18	0	0	0	–		0	0	18	0
Persiraja Banda Aceh	2024–25	11	0	0	0	–		0	0	11	0
Career total		46	0	0	0	0	0	0	0	46	0
