= Mujahidin Ilyas =

Indonesian footballer (born 2002)

Personal information
- Full name: Mujahidin Ilyas
- Date of birth: 2 April 2002 (age 24)
- Place of birth: Lhokseumawe, Indonesia
- Height: 1.68 m (5 ft 6 in)
- Position: Midfielder

Team information
- Current team: Persiraja Banda Aceh
- Number: 15

Senior career*
Years	Team	Apps	(Gls)
2023–2024	PSAB Aceh Besar		
2024–2025	PSLS Lhokseumawe		
2025–	Persiraja Banda Aceh	5	(1)
- * Club domestic league appearances and goals as of 13 September 2026

Mujahidin Ilyas (born 2 April 2002), also known as Muja Ilyas, is an Indonesian professional footballer who plays as a midfielder for Championship club Persiraja Banda Aceh.

== Club career ==
Ilyas began his football career by playing in the regional non-professional leagues of Aceh, representing amateur sides including PSAB Aceh Besar and his hometown club PSLS Lhokseumawe. His performances in the local competitions caught the attention of scouts from the province's highest-ranked professional club.

On 12 August 2025, Ilyas officially signed a professional contract with Championship side Persiraja Banda Aceh ahead of the 2025–26 Championship campaign. He scored his first professional goal for the club during a match against Adhyaksa Banten, securing a late-minute breakthrough that energized the home fans. Following a solid rotation display, his contract was extended in July 2026 to keep him with the Laskar Rencong squad for the 2026–27 season.
