= Wimba Sutan Fanosa =

Indonesian footballer

Wimba Sutan
Personal information
- Full name: Wimba Sutan Fanosa
- Date of birth: January 27, 1987 (age 39)
- Place of birth: Malang, Indonesia
- Height: 1.76 m (5 ft 9 in)
- Position: Striker

Youth career
- 2006–2008: Persebaya Surabaya

Senior career*
Years	Team	Apps	(Gls)
2008–2010	Persebaya Surabaya	3	(0)
2010–2011	PS Mojokerto Putra	10	(0)
2011–2012	Gresik United	0	(0)
2013–2016	Persik Kediri	11	(4)
2017–2018	Deltras	51	(38)
2019	Perserang Serang	2	(0)
2019	Persik Kediri	14	(5)
2020	Semen Padang	0	(0)
2021	Hizbul Wathan	1	(0)
2022–2023	Persika Karanganyar	1	(3)
2023	Perssu	3	(1)
- * Club domestic league appearances and goals

Wimba Sutan Fanosa (born January 27, 1987) is an Indonesian former footballer who last played as a striker for Perssu.

== Honours ==
Persik Kediri

- Liga 2: 2019
