= Muhammad Tahir (footballer, born 1994) =

Indonesian footballer

Personal information
- Full name: Muhammad Tahir
- Date of birth: 4 January 1994 (age 32)
- Place of birth: Jayapura, Indonesia
- Height: 1.75 m (5 ft 9 in)
- Position: Defensive midfielder

Youth career
- 2006–2011: Tunas Muda Hamadi
- 2012–2015: Persipura Jayapura

Senior career*
Years	Team	Apps	(Gls)
2015–2023	Persipura Jayapura	123	(4)
2023	→ RANS Nusantara (loan)	11	(1)
2023	Madura United	8	(0)
2023–2026	PSBS Biak	43	(1)
2025–2026	→ PSS Sleman (loan)	12	(0)
- * Club domestic league appearances and goals as of 14 February 2026

Muhammad Tahir (born 4 January 1994) is an Indonesian professional footballer who plays as a defensive midfielder.

== Club career ==
=== Persipura Jayapura ===
Tahir started his career when in SSB Tunas Muda Hamadi, then was recruited by Persipura U21. In 2016, Tahir joined to senior team of Persipura in the 2016 Piala Bhayangkara. He and four other players from Persipura U21 were recruited by Osvaldo Lessa, and Tahir became one of the players who gained the most attention.

Tahir was included in the squad for the Indonesia Soccer Championship. He made his professional debut against Bali United in the second week ISC A.

==== Loan to RANS Nusantara ====
On 27 January 2023, Tahir signed a contract with Liga 1 club Rans Nusantara, on loan from Persipura Jayapura. Tahir made his league debut for the club in a 1–2 lose against Arema.

=== Madura United ===
Tahir was signed for Madura United to play in Liga 1 in the 2023–24 season.

== Career statistics ==
=== Club ===
As of 14 February 2026

Club	Season	League			Cup		Continental		Other		Total	
Club	Season	Division	Apps	Goals	Apps	Goals	Apps	Goals	Apps	Goals	Apps	Goals
Persipura Jayapura	2015	Indonesia Super League	0	0	0	0	–		0	0	0	0
Persipura Jayapura	2016	ISC A	8	0	0	0	–		0	0	8	0
Persipura Jayapura	2017	Liga 1	23	1	0	0	–		0	0	23	1
Persipura Jayapura	2018	Liga 1	31	0	0	0	–		0	0	31	0
Persipura Jayapura	2019	Liga 1	29	2	0	0	–		3 (Note: Appearances in Indonesia President's Cup.)	0	32	2
Persipura Jayapura	2020–21	Liga 1	3	1	0	0	–		0	0	3	1
Persipura Jayapura	2021	Liga 1	23	0	0	0	–		0	0	23	0
Persipura Jayapura	2022	Liga 2	6	0	0	0	–		0	0	6	0
RANS Nusantara (loan)	2022–23	Liga 1	11	1	0	0	–		0	0	11	1
Madura United	2023–24	Liga 1	8	0	0	0	–		0	0	8	0
PSBS Biak	2023–24	Liga 2	16	0	0	0	–		0	0	16	0
PSBS Biak	2024–25	Liga 1	26	1	0	0	–		0	0	26	1
PSBS Biak	2025–26	Liga 1	1	0	0	0	–		0	0	1	0
PSS Sleman (loan)	2025–26	Liga 2	12	0	0	0	–		0	0	12	0
Career total			197	6	0	0	–		3	0	200	6

== Honours ==
Persipura Jayapura

- Indonesia Soccer Championship A: 2016

PSBS Biak

- Liga 2: 2023–24

PSS Sleman

- Championship runner up: 2025–26
