= Chandra Waskito =

Indonesian footballer

Personal information
- Full name: Chandra Waskito Kusumawardana
- Date of birth: 19 August 1994 (age 32)
- Place of birth: Surakarta, Indonesia
- Height: 1.79 m (5 ft 10 in)
- Position: Forward

Team information
- Current team: Persiku Kudus
- Number: 10

Youth career
- 2011: Persis Solo
- 2012: Pelita Jaya U21

Senior career*
Years	Team	Apps	(Gls)
2013–2015	Persis Solo	5	(0)
2016	Madiun Putra	10	(4)
2016–2017	PSS Sleman	23	(4)
2018	Persis Solo	12	(0)
2018–2021	Persita Tangerang	43	(12)
2021	RANS Cilegon	4	(0)
2022	Sulut United	4	(0)
2023–2024	Persebaya Surabaya	3	(0)
2024–	Persiku Kudus	21	(1)
- * Club domestic league appearances and goals as of 25 February 2025

Chandra Waskito Kusumawardana (born 19 August 1994) is an Indonesian professional footballer who plays as a forward for Liga 2 club Persiku Kudus.

== Club career ==
=== Persita Tangerang ===
In 2018, Chandra Waskito signed a year contract with Persita Tangerang from Persis Solo.

=== RANS Cilegon ===
He was signed for RANS Cilegon to play in the second round of Liga 2 in the 2021 season. Chandra made his debut on 19 December 2021 in a match against Persiba Balikpapan at the Pakansari Stadium, Cibinong.

== Honours ==
=== Club ===
Persita Tangerang;

- Liga 2 runner-up: 2019

RANS Cilegon

- Liga 2 runner-up: 2021
