= Melcior Majefat =

Indonesian association footballer

Personal information
- Full name: Melcior Leideker Majefat
- Date of birth: 20 April 1994 (age 32)
- Place of birth: Sorong, Indonesia
- Height: 1.72 m (5 ft 8 in)
- Position: Right-back

Team information
- Current team: Persmin Minahasa
- Number: 22

Senior career*
Years	Team	Apps	(Gls)
2016–2017	Persiba Balikpapan	9	(3)
2017–2018	PSIS Semarang	33	(7)
2019	Badak Lampung	12	(0)
2020–2021	Kalteng Putra	9	(0)
2022–2023	PSDS Deli Serdang	6	(1)
2023–2024	PSBS Biak	16	(1)
2024–2025	Semen Padang	10	(0)
2026–	Persmin Minahasa	1	(0)
- * Club domestic league appearances and goals as of 9 April 2026

Melcior Leideker Majefat (born 20 April 1994) is an Indonesian professional footballer who plays as a right-back for Liga 4 club Persmin Minahasa.

== Club career ==
=== PSIS Semarang ===
He was signed for PSIS Semarang to play in Liga 2 in the 2017 season. He made 33 league appearances and scored seven goals for PSIS Semarang.

=== Badak Lampung ===
In 2019, Melcior signed a one-year contract with Indonesian Liga 1 club Badak Lampung. He made his league debut on 18 May 2019 in a match against TIRA-Persikabo at the Pakansari Stadium, Cibinong.

=== Kalteng Putra ===
He was signed for Kalteng Putra to play in Liga 2 in the 2020 season. This season was suspended on 27 March 2020 due to the COVID-19 pandemic. The season was abandoned and was declared void on 20 January 2021.

== Honours ==
=== Club ===
PSIS Semarang

- Liga 2 third place (play-offs): 2017

PSBS Biak

- Liga 2: 2023–24
