= Muhamad Firly =

Indonesian footballer

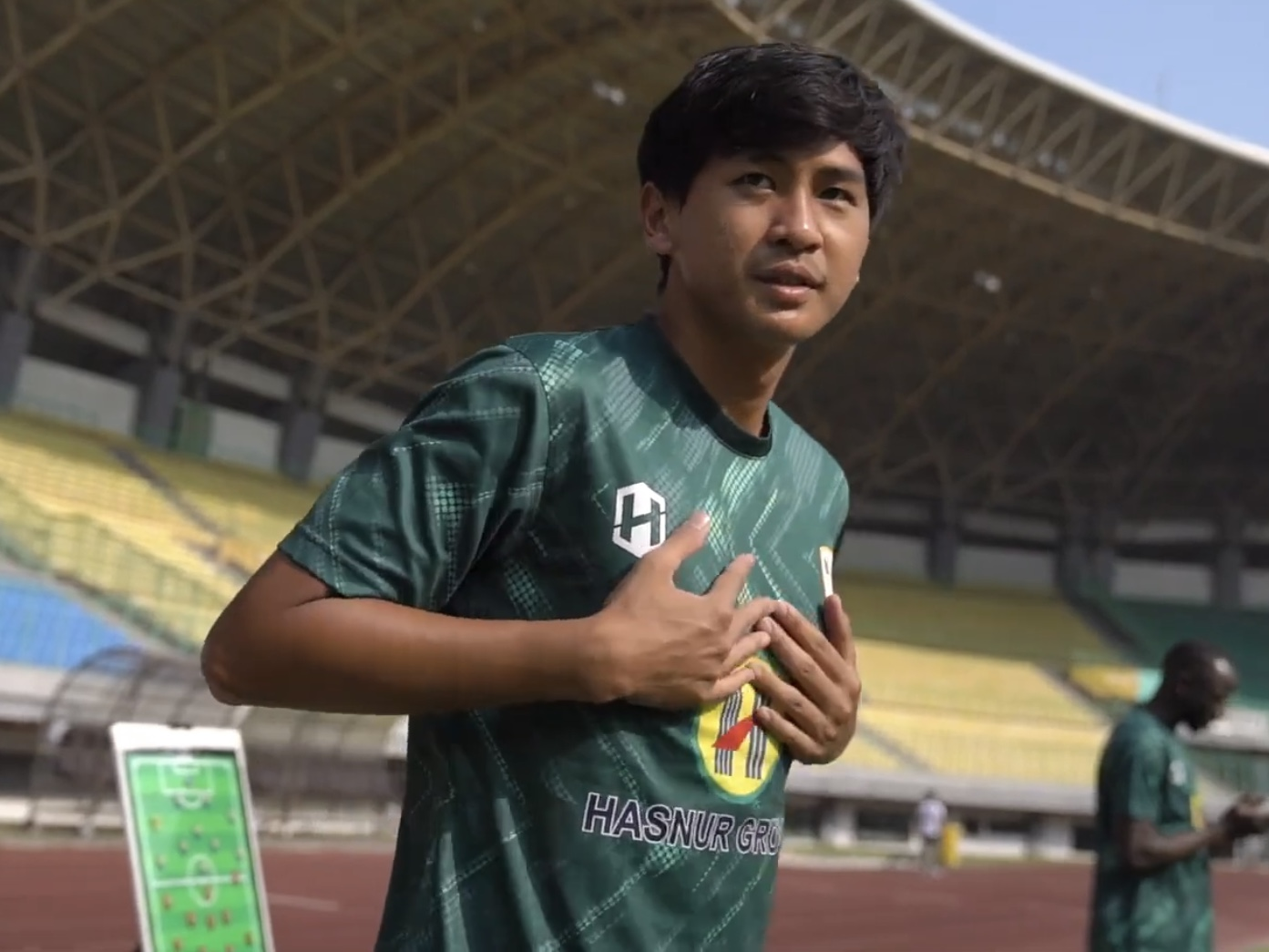
- Firly training with Barito Putera in 2023

Personal information
- Full name: Muhamad Firly
- Date of birth: 16 July 1999 (age 27)
- Place of birth: Depok, Indonesia
- Height: 1.85 m (6 ft 1 in)
- Positions: Centre-back; defensive midfielder

Team information
- Current team: Java United
- Number: 85

Youth career
- 2010–2016: Pelita Jaya
- 2019–2020: Barito Putera

Senior career*
Years	Team	Apps	(Gls)
2017	Persikad Depok	0	(0)
2018	Bogor	5	(0)
2020–2026	Barito Putera	75	(1)
2025–2026	→ Persik Kediri (loan)	20	(2)
2026–	Java United	0	(0)

International career^{‡}
2018	Indonesia U19	2	(0)
2021	Indonesia U23	1	(0)
Medal record
Men's football
Representing Indonesia
AFF U-19 Youth Championship
Third place	2018 Indonesia	Team
- * Club domestic league appearances and goals as of 23 May 2026 ‡ National team caps and goals as of 22 October 2021

Muhamad Firly (born 16 July 1999) is an Indonesian professional footballer who plays as a centre-back or defensive midfielder for Super League club Java United.

== Club career ==
=== Barito Putera ===
He was signed for Barito Putera to play in Liga 1 in the 2021 season. Firly made his league debut on 23 September 2021 in a match against Persikabo 1973 at the Wibawa Mukti Stadium, Cikarang.

==== Persik Kediri (loan) ====
On 25 June 2025, he was signed for Persik Kediri, on loan from Barito Putera.

== International career ==
In October 2021, Firly was called up to the Indonesia U23 in a friendly match against Tajikistan and Nepal and also prepared for 2022 AFC U-23 Asian Cup qualification in Tajikistan by Shin Tae-yong.

== Career statistics ==
=== Club ===
As of 23 May 2026.

Club	Season	League		Cup		Other		Total	
Club	Season	Apps	Goals	Apps	Goals	Apps	Goals	Apps	Goals
Persikad	2017	0	0	0	0	0	0	0	0
Bogor	2018	5	0	0	0	0	0	5	0
Barito Putera	2020	0	0	0	0	0	0	0	0
Barito Putera	2021–22	13	0	0	0	4 (Note: Appearances in Menpora Cup)	1	17	1
Barito Putera	2022–23	17	0	0	0	3 (Note: Appearances in Indonesia President's Cup)	0	20	0
Barito Putera	2023–24	25	0	0	0	0	0	25	0
Barito Putera	2024–25	20	1	0	0	0	0	20	1
Persik Kediri (loan)	2025–26	20	2	0	0	0	0	20	2
Career total		99	3	0	0	7	1	106	4

== Honours ==
=== International ===
Indonesia U-19

- AFF U-19 Youth Championship third place: 2018
