= PSPS Pekanbaru =

Indonesian football club

PSPS
- Full name: Persatuan Sepakbola Pekanbaru dan Sekitarnya
- Nicknames: Askar Bertuah (Lucky Warriors); Tapir Sumatera (The Sumatran Tapir)
- Short name: PKU
- Founded: 1 January 1955; 71 years ago
- Ground: Kaharudin Nasution Stadium
- Capacity: 30,000
- Owner: Pancoran Soccer Field Group
- President: Effendi Syahputra
- Head coach: Akhyar Ilyas
- League: Championship
- 2025–26: 6th (1st Group)
Home colours	Away colours

Persatuan Sepakbola Pekanbaru dan Sekitarnya (commonly known as PSPS) is an Indonesian professional football club based in Pekanbaru, Riau. They currently play in the Championship. Their home ground is the Riau Main Stadium.

== History ==
PSPS was formed on 1 January 1955. This team took 43 years to reach the Divisi Utama PSSI in 1999. It was originally formed when PSPS was a small football association consisting of five member clubs, namely PS IPP (Ikatan Pemuda Pekanbaru), PS Pelayaran, PS Caltex, PS PU (Pekerjaan Umum), and PS Elektra (PLN).

== Players ==
=== Current squad ===
As of September 2026

Note: Flags indicate national team as defined under FIFA eligibility rules; some limited exceptions apply. Players may hold more than one non-FIFA nationality.

No.	Pos.	Nation	Player
1	GK	IDN	Dicki Agung
3	DF	IDN	Andik Rendika Rama
4	MF	IDN	Misbakus Solikin
5	DF	BRA	Luiz Henrique Motta
6	DF	IDN	Muhammad Revan
7	MF	IDN	Hamzah Deva
8	MF	BRA	Matheus Machado
10	FW	BRA	Antônio Gamaroni
11	FW	IDN	Doni Aditya
13	MF	IDN	Ihsan Kusuma (on loan from Persija Jakarta)
14	MF	IDN	Reza Kusuma (on loan from Bhayangkara Presisi)
15	DF	IDN	Zacky Arya
16	FW	IDN	Hendika Pratama

No.	Pos.	Nation	Player
17	FW	IDN	Asir Asiz
18	DF	IDN	Zidan Khairullah
19	DF	IDN	Pramudya Trenady
20	GK	IDN	Dian Rizkiyana
22	FW	IDN	Fahran Darwan
25	DF	IDN	Alfin Tuasalamony (captain)
26	FW	IDN	Asad Zidan
32	FW	IDN	Vieri Ariyanto
55	MF	IDN	Jenico Riski
62	MF	IDN	Dimas Wicaksono
63	MF	IDN	Aulia Ramadhan
75	GK	IDN	Januarius Meka
77	DF	IDN	Ilham Syafri
78	GK	IDN	Davian Rayan
97	MF	IDN	Ilham Fathoni
99	FW	IDN	Natanael Siringoringo

== Coaching staff ==
Position	Name
Technical director	Vacant
Head coach	(Indonesia) Akhyar Ilyas
Assistant coach	(Indonesia) Ambrizal (Indonesia) Roffy Wikongsinarjo
Goalkeeper coach	(Indonesia) Abdul Rohman
Physical coach	(Indonesia) Abda Alief

== Honours ==
- Liga Indonesia First Division
  - Winners (1): 1999

== Seasons ==
Note: Only displaying from 2008–09 season

Champions	Runners-up	Third place	Promoted	Relegated

Season	Division	Position	Pld	W	D	L	GF	GA	Pts	Cup	AFC competition(s)	
2008–09	PD	3rd (Note: Overall.)	33	19	7	7	58	32	64	Second round	–	–
2009–10	SL	7th	34	14	7	13	43	37	49	First round	–	–
2010–11	SL	11th (Note: Docked 3 points.)	28	10	3	15	38	47	30	–	–	–
2011–12	SL	13th	34	11	5	18	40	54	38	–	–	–
2013	SL	18th	34	4	5	23	26	107	17	–	–	–
2014	PD	4th (Note: Group K in Second Round.)	20	8	3	9	29	31	27	–	–	–
2015	PD	season not finished									–	–
2016	ISC-B	QF (Note: Overall.)	18	8	5	5	31	20	29	–	–	–
2017	L2	3rd (Note: Group Y in Third Round.)	21	10	7	4	34	17	37	–	–	–
2018	L2	6th (Note: West Region in First Round.)	22	8	7	7	30	38	31	First round	–	–
2019	L2	9th (Note: West Region in First Round.)	22	7	5	10	25	33	26	–	–	–
2020	L2	season declared void									–	–
2021–22	L2	3rd (Note: Group A in First Round.)	10	4	3	3	8	9	15	–	–	–
2022–23	L2	season not finished									–	–
2023–24	L2	2nd (Note: Group B in Relegation Round.)	18	4	9	5	19	22	21	–	–	–
2024–25	L2	4th (Note: Promotion Play-off)	22	10	6	6	33	24	36	–	–	–
2025–26	CH	6th	27	9	10	8	50	45	37	–	–	–
2026–27	CH		27	0	0	0	0	0	0	–	–	–

=== Season by season ===
Note: Since Indonesia Super League (now Liga 1) launch in 2008–09 season, Liga Indonesia Premer Division (now Liga 2) dropped down to second tier. However, there is no data available for this team in its participation in the Indonesian League First Division from the 1995 to 1998 season as well as the 2006 season.

Season	Tier	Division	Place	Piala Indonesia
1994–95	3	SD	3rd	–
1995–96	2	FD	3rd (West Division)	–
1996–97	2	FD	3rd (Second round)	–
1997–98	2	FD	declared void	–
1998–99	2	FD	1st	–
1999–2000	1	PD	5th (West Division)	–
2001	1	PD	6th (West Division)	–
2002	1	PD	5th (West Division)	–
2003	1	PD	9th	–
2004	1	PD	16th	–
2005	1	PD	3rd (Relegation Play-off)	Second Round
2006	2	FD	4th (1R: Region I)	Second Round
2007	2	FD	4th (1R: Region I)	–

Season	Tier	Division	Place	Piala Indonesia
2008–09	2	PD	3rd	Second Round
2009–10	1	SL	7th	First Round
2010–11	1	SL	11th	–
2011–12	1	SL	13th	–
2013	1	SL	18th	–
2014	2	PD	4th (2R: Group K)	–
2015	2	PD	not finished	–
2016	2	ISC-B	Quarter Final	–
2017	2	L2	3rd (3R: Group Y)	–
2018	2	L2	6th (1R: West Region)	First round
2019	2	L2	9th (1R: West Region)	–
2020	2	L2	declared void	–
2021–22	2	L2	3rd (1R: Group A)	–
2022–23	2	L2	not finished	–
2023–24	2	L2	2nd (Rel-RD: Group B)	–
2024–25	2	L2	4th	–

Current league

- 11 seasons in Liga 2
- 4 seasons in Liga 1

Defunct league

- 6 seasons in Premier Division (as first tier)
- 6 seasons in First Division (as second tier)
- 1 seasons in Second Division (as third tier)
- 1 season in ISC-B

== Kit manufacturer ==
- Lotto (2009–2011)
- Pluso (2012)
- Joma (2012–2014)
- Calcetto (2015–2017)
- Classico (2017–2018)
- Kelme (2018–2019)
- Curva (2019–2021)
- 93 Sports (2021–2023)
- Curva (2023–)
