= 2019 Liga 2 (Indonesia) =

Liga 2
- Season: 2019
- Dates: 22 June – 25 November 2019
- Champions: Persik (1st title)
- Promoted: Persik; Persita; Persiraja
- Relegated: Bandung United; Madura; Persatu; Persibat; PSGC; PSMP (Disqualified)
- Matches: 258
- Goals: 567 (2.2 per match)
- Best player: Taufiq Febriyanto
- Top goalscorer: Sirvi Arvani (14 goals)
- Biggest home win: Persita 5–0 PSPS Riau (6 July 2019); PSPS Riau 5–0 PSGC (12 October 2019)
- Biggest away win: Bandung United 0–3 Perserang (1 August 2019)
- Highest scoring: Persita 4–4 Bandung United (13 August 2019)
- Longest winning run: 6 matches Persiraja
- Longest unbeaten run: 9 matches Persis
- Longest winless run: 9 matches Bandung United
- Longest losing run: 6 matches PSGC
- Highest attendance: 27,295; Persis 2–1 PSIM (16 August 2019)
- Lowest attendance: 0 Persis 1–1 Mitra Kukar (23 August 2019)
- Total attendance: 840,945
- Average attendance: 3,259
- Goals scored in penalty shoot-outs are not included.

The 2019 Liga 2 was the third season of the Liga 2 under its current name and the 10th season under its current league structure.

Persik won the title after a 3–2 win over Persita in the final at Kapten I Wayan Dipta Stadium, Gianyar on 25 November 2019.

== Teams ==
=== Team changes ===
The following teams have changed division since the 2018 season.

==== To Liga 2 ====
Relegated from Liga 1

- Mitra Kukar
- Sriwijaya
- PSMS

Promoted from Liga 3

- Persik
- PSCS
- PSGC
- Persatu
- Sulut United (formerly Bogor)
- Persewar

==== From Liga 2 ====
Promoted to Liga 1

- PSS
- Semen Padang
- Kalteng Putra

Relegated to Liga 3

- Gresik United
- Persik Kendal
- Persika
- Persiwa
- PSIR
- Semeru

Disqualified for 2019 season

- PSMP

=== Name changes ===
- Aceh United merged with PS Timah Babel into Babel United and relocated to Pangkal Pinang.
- Bogor relocated to Manado and were renamed to Sulut United.
- Blitar United relocated to Bandung and became the reserve team of Persib named Bandung United.

=== Stadiums and locations ===
Locations of the 2019 Liga 2 teams (Red: West Region, Blue: East Region)

| Team | Location | Stadium | Capacity |
|---|---|---|---|
| Babel United | Pangkal Pinang | Depati Amir | 15,000 |
| Bandung United | Bandung | Siliwangi | 15,000 |
| Cilegon United | Cilegon | Krakatau Steel | 25,000 |
| Madura | Sumenep | Ahmad Yani | 15,000 |
| Martapura | Martapura | Demang Lehman | 15,000 |
| Mitra Kukar | Tenggarong | Rondong Demang (Note: Mitra Kukar also registered Aji Imbut their home stadium.) | 6,000 |
| Persatu | Tuban | Bumi Wali | 25,000 |
| Perserang | Serang | Maulana Yusuf | 15,000 |
| Persewar | Biak Numfor | Cendrawasih (Note: Persewar is playing their home matches at Untung Suropati for the first half of the season and will be playing at Cendrawasih for the second half of the season.) | 15,000 |
| Persiba | Balikpapan | Batakan | 40,000 |
| Persibat | Batang | Moh Sarengat | 15,000 |
| Persik | Kediri | Brawijaya | 20,000 |
| Persiraja | Banda Aceh | Haji Dimurthala | 20,000 |
| Persis | Madiun | Wilis (Note: Persis is playing their home matches at Wilis due to the renovation of their stadium at Manahan.) | 25,000 |
| Persita | Tangerang | Benteng Taruna | 30,000 |
| PSBS | Biak Numfor | Cendrawasih | 15,000 |
| PSCS | Cilacap | Wijayakusuma | 15,000 |
| PSGC | Ciamis | Galuh | 20,000 |
| PSIM | Yogyakarta | Mandala Krida (Note: PSIM is playing some of their early home matches at the Sultan Agung, Bantul because Mandala Krida is still under renovation.) | 35,000 |
| PSMS | Medan | Teladan | 20,000 |
| PSPS Riau | Pekanbaru | Kaharudin Nasution | 30,000 |
| Sriwijaya | Palembang | Gelora Sriwijaya | 23,000 |
| Sulut United | Manado | Klabat | 10,000 |

=== Personnel and kits ===
Note: Flags indicate national team as has been defined under FIFA eligibility rules. Players and coaches may hold more than one non-FIFA nationality.

| Team | Head coach | Captain | Kit manufacturer | Shirt Sponsor(s) |
|---|---|---|---|---|
| Babel United | (Indonesia) I Putu Gede | (Indonesia) Agus Indra | JN | RBT^{1}, Oasis^{1}, J&F Coffee^{1}, Klix^{1}, Visit Babel^{2} |
| Bandung United | (Indonesia) Budiman Yunus | (Indonesia) Tantan | Sportama | |
| Cilegon United | (Indonesia) Imam Riyadi | (Indonesia) Septian Andriansyah | Mattch | PT. Cilegon Putra Mandala^{1}, Krakatau Steel^{1} |
| Madura | (Indonesia) Agus Yuwono | (Indonesia) Bakori Andreas | MBB | Kaisar^{1}, de Baghraf^{1} |
| Martapura | (Indonesia) Frans Sinatra Huwae | (Indonesia) Amirul Mukminin | Libero | PT Batu Agung Mulia^{1}, Hasnur Group^{2} |
| Mitra Kukar | (Spain) Rafael Berges | (Indonesia) Anindito Wahyu | Joma | ABP Energy^{1} |
| Persatu | (Indonesia) Bambang Sumantri | (Indonesia) Dhanu Rosadhe | Gendoel | Semen Gresik^{1}, Dua Berlian Mandiri^{1}, Next Gen^{1}, BookMyShow^{1}, Al-Mujaddid Center^{1}, PT Timbul Persada^{2}, PT Drajad Alam Semesta Raya^{2}, NA Center^{3}, Rumah Sakit Nahdlatul Ulama Tuban^{3} |
| Perserang | (Indonesia) Jaya Hartono | (Indonesia) Idang Novriza | Made by Club | |
| Persewar | (Indonesia) Elie Aiboy | (Indonesia) Anthonius Kipin | Grande | Bank Papua^{1}, Northcliff^{1} |
| Persiba | (Indonesia) Satia Badgja | (Indonesia) Taufiq Kasrun | MBB | PT Cindara Pratama Lines^{1}, HBICS^{1}, Bank Kaltimtara^{2} |
| Persibat | (Indonesia) Bona Simanjuntak | (Indonesia) Arif Budiono | Maknorukun | |
| Persik | (Indonesia) Budiardjo Thalib | (Indonesia) Faris Aditama | MBB | Biznet^{1} |
| Persiraja | (Indonesia) Hendri Susilo | (Indonesia) Mukhlis Nakata | Trops | Bank Aceh^{1}, PDAM Tirta Daroy Banda Aceh^{1}, Dek Gam Foundation^{1} |
| Persis | (Indonesia) Salahudin | (Indonesia) Jodi Kustiawan | Saestu | MedcoEnergi^{1}, Syahdana Property Nusantara^{1} |
| Persita | (Indonesia) Widodo C. Putro | (Indonesia) Egi Melgiansyah | Made by Club | Moya^{1}, Krating Daeng^{1}, Aetra Tangerang^{3} |
| PSBS | (Indonesia) Slamet Riyadi | (Indonesia) Patrias Rumere | Artland | Bank Papua^{1} |
| PSCS | (Indonesia) Djoko Susilo | (Indonesia) Jimmy Suparno | Calsie | S2P^{1}, Bank Jateng^{1}, Adyasolar^{3}, PT Rafi Prima Persada^{3} |
| PSGC | (Indonesia) Andri Wijaya | (Indonesia) Arif Budiman | MBB | Sumber Jaya^{1}, Bank BJB^{1}, Rumah Makan & Catering Linggar Sari^{2}, Indah Group^{3} |
| PSIM | (Indonesia) Liestiadi | (Indonesia) Cristian Gonzáles | Made by Club | Parkee^{1}, Smartfren^{1}, ReneSola^{1}, CentrePark^{1}, Tolak Angin^{2}, Winnetnews^{2} |
| PSMS | (Indonesia) Jafri Sastra | (Indonesia) Legimin Raharjo | Made by Club | Bank Sumut^{1}, Indomie^{1} |
| PSPS Riau | (Malaysia) Raja Isa | (Indonesia) Rido Rinaldi | Curva Sport | |
| Sriwijaya | (Indonesia) Kas Hartadi | (Indonesia) Ambrizal | Calci | Bank Sumsel Babel^{1}, Bukit Asam^{1}, PDPDE Sumsel^{2} |
| Sulut United | (Indonesia) Ricky Nelson | (Indonesia) Iman Fathurohman | Made by Club | PT Minahasa Cahaya Lestari^{1}, Smartfren^{1} |

Notes:

1. On the front of shirt.
2. On the back of shirt.
3. On the sleeves.
4. On the shorts.

=== Coaching changes ===
| Team | Outgoing coach | Manner of departure | Date of vacancy | Position in table | Incoming coach | Date of appointment |
|---|---|---|---|---|---|---|
| Babel United | (Indonesia) Bonggo Pribadi | Return to Bandung United | 20 November 2018 | Pre-season | (Indonesia) I Putu Gede | 10 May 2019 |
| Bandung United | Vacant | | | Pre-season | (Indonesia) Bonggo Pribadi | 20 November 2018 |
| Persiba | (Indonesia) Haryadi | End of contract | 10 December 2018 | Pre-season | (Indonesia) Salahudin | 11 January 2019 |
| Sriwijaya | (Argentina) Alfredo Vera | End of contract | 25 December 2018 | Pre-season | (Indonesia) Kas Hartadi | 18 March 2019 |
| Sulut United | (Indonesia) Jan Saragih | Mutual consent | 27 December 2018 | Pre-season | (Montenegro) Vladimir Vujović | 16 January 2019 |
| Cilegon United | (Indonesia) Sasi Kirono | End of contract | 31 December 2018 | Pre-season | (Indonesia) Bambang Nurdiansyah | 13 May 2019 |
| Persibat | (Indonesia) Daniel Roekito | End of contract | 31 December 2018 | Pre-season | (Indonesia) Freddy Muli | 30 March 2019 |
| Persiraja | (Indonesia) Akhyar Ilyas | End of contract | 31 December 2018 | Pre-season | (Indonesia) Hendri Susilo | 4 May 2019 |
| PSIM | (Indonesia) Bona Simanjuntak | End of contract | 31 December 2018 | Pre-season | (Montenegro) Vladimir Vujović | 27 March 2019 |
| PSMS | (England) Peter Butler | End of contract | 31 December 2018 | Pre-season | (Indonesia) Abdul R. Gurning | 14 January 2019 |
| Mitra Kukar | (Indonesia) Rahmad Darmawan | Signed by PS TIRA | 2 January 2019 | Pre-season | (Spain) Rafael Berges | 14 June 2019 |
| Persatu | (Indonesia) Edy Sutrisno | Mutual consent | 7 January 2019 | Pre-season | (Indonesia) Purwanto Suwondo | 12 May 2019 |
| Madura | (Indonesia) Salahudin | Signed by Persiba | 11 January 2019 | Pre-season | (Indonesia) Eduard Tjong | 29 April 2019 |
| Persita | (Indonesia) Wiganda Saputra | Demoted to assistant coach | 18 January 2019 | Pre-season | (Indonesia) Widodo C. Putro | 18 January 2019 |
| Persik | (Indonesia) Alfiat | Demoted to assistant coach | 24 January 2019 | Pre-season | (Indonesia) Nazal Mustofa | 22 March 2019 |
| Perserang | (Indonesia) Bambang Nurdiansyah | Signed by Cilegon United | 5 February 2019 | Pre-season | (Indonesia) Jaya Hartono | 12 May 2019 |
| PSCS | (Indonesia) Jaya Hartono | Resigned | 25 February 2019 | Pre-season | (Indonesia) Ibnu Grahan | 14 March 2019 |
| Sulut United | (Montenegro) Vladimir Vujović | Signed by PSIM | 27 March 2019 | Pre-season | (Indonesia) Herry Kiswanto | 26 May 2019 |
| PSPS Riau | (Indonesia) Hendri Susilo | Signed by Persiraja | 4 May 2019 | Pre-season | (Indonesia) Bona Simanjuntak | 28 May 2019 |
| PSGC | (Indonesia) Heri Rafni Kotari | Mutual consent | 11 May 2019 | Pre-season | (Indonesia) Herrie Setyawan | 11 May 2019 |
| PSCS | (Indonesia) Ibnu Grahan | Resigned | 27 May 2019 | Pre-season | (Indonesia) Djoko Susilo | 10 June 2019 |
| Persik | (Indonesia) Nazal Mustofa | Resigned | 30 May 2019 | Pre-season | (Indonesia) Budiardjo Thalib | 11 June 2019 |
| Bandung United | (Indonesia) Bonggo Pribadi | Mutual consent | 10 June 2019 | Pre-season | (Indonesia) Liestiadi | 10 June 2019 |
| PSIM | (Montenegro) Vladimir Vujović | Resigned | 9 July 2019 | 9th in East Region | (Indonesia) Aji Santoso | 15 July 2019 |
| Persibat | (Indonesia) Freddy Muli | Resigned | 13 July 2019 | 10th in West Region | (Indonesia) Bona Simanjuntak | 17 July 2019 |
| Persis | (Indonesia) Agus Yuwono | Resigned | 14 July 2019 | 11th in East Region | (Indonesia) Choirul Huda (Note: Choirul Huda was initially appointed as caretaker manager, but the move was made permanent on 17 August 2019.) | 15 July 2019 |
| PSPS Riau | (Indonesia) Bona Simanjuntak | Resigned | 14 July 2019 | 11th in West Region | (Indonesia) Raja Faisal | 14 July 2019 |
| Persiba | (Indonesia) Salahudin | Sacked | 22 July 2019 | 6th in East Region | (Indonesia) Satia Badgja | 24 July 2019 |
| PSGC | (Indonesia) Herrie Setyawan | Resigned | 23 July 2019 | 12th in West Region | (Indonesia) Heri Rafni Kotari | 25 July 2019 |
| Persatu | (Indonesia) Purwanto Suwondo | Resigned | 24 July 2019 | 11th in East Region | (Indonesia) Bambang Sumantri | 25 July 2019 |
| Madura | (Indonesia) Eduard Tjong | Resigned | 10 August 2019 | 8th in East Region | (Indonesia) Agus Yuwono | 12 August 2019 |
| Cilegon United | (Indonesia) Bambang Nurdiansyah | Resigned | 18 August 2019 | 5th in West Region | (Indonesia) Imam Riyadi | 22 August 2019 |
| PSGC | (Indonesia) Heri Rafni Kotari | End of caretaker role | 20 August 2019 | 10th in West Region | (Indonesia) Andri Wijaya | 20 August 2019 |
| PSPS Riau | (Indonesia) Raja Faisal | End of caretaker role | 5 September 2019 | 10th in West Region | (Malaysia) Raja Isa | 5 September 2019 |
| PSMS | (Indonesia) Abdul R. Gurning | Resigned | 7 September 2019 | 7th in West Region | (Indonesia) Jafri Sastra | 8 September 2019 |
| Sulut United | (Indonesia) Herry Kiswanto | Resigned | 10 September 2019 | 7th in East Region | (Indonesia) Ricky Nelson | 10 September 2019 |
| Bandung United | (Indonesia) Liestiadi | Resigned | 11 September 2019 | 12th in West Region | (Indonesia) Budiman Yunus | 11 September 2019 |
| Persis | (Indonesia) Choirul Huda | Demoted to assistant coach | 27 September 2019 | 5th in East Region | (Indonesia) Salahudin | 27 September 2019 |
| PSIM | (Indonesia) Aji Santoso | Resigned | 9 October 2019 | 7th in East Region | (Indonesia) Liestiadi | 10 October 2019 |
| Persewar | (Indonesia) Carolino Ivakdalam | Resigned | 7 November 2019 | Pre-second round | (Indonesia) Elie Aiboy | 7 November 2019 |

== First round ==
=== West region ===
| Pos | Team | Pld | W | D | L | GF | GA | GD | Pts | Qualification or relegation |
|---|---|---|---|---|---|---|---|---|---|---|
| 1 | Persiraja (P) | 22 | 14 | 0 | 8 | 36 | 23 | +13 | 42 (Note: Head-to-head results: Persita 2–1 Persiraja; Persiraja 1–0 Persita.) | Advance to the second round |
| 2 | Persita (P) | 22 | 12 | 6 | 4 | 35 | 16 | +19 | 42 | Advance to the second round |
| 3 | Sriwijaya | 22 | 12 | 4 | 6 | 26 | 17 | +9 | 40 | Advance to the second round |
| 4 | PSMS | 22 | 11 | 4 | 7 | 27 | 23 | +4 | 37 | Advance to the second round |
| 5 | PSCS | 22 | 10 | 6 | 6 | 31 | 21 | +10 | 36 | |
| 6 | Perserang | 22 | 10 | 3 | 9 | 24 | 23 | +1 | 33 | |
| 7 | Cilegon United | 22 | 9 | 4 | 9 | 24 | 25 | −1 | 31 | |
| 8 | Babel United | 22 | 9 | 3 | 10 | 23 | 27 | −4 | 30 | |
| 9 | PSPS Riau | 22 | 7 | 5 | 10 | 25 | 33 | −8 | 26 | |
| 10 | PSGC (R) | 22 | 6 | 1 | 15 | 24 | 38 | −14 | 19 | Relegation to Liga 3 |
| 11 | Persibat (Note: Persibat were deducted nine points due to PSSI Disciplinary Committee sanction.) (R) | 22 | 7 | 4 | 11 | 24 | 37 | −13 | 16 | Relegation to Liga 3 |
| 12 | Bandung United (R) | 22 | 2 | 6 | 14 | 22 | 38 | −16 | 12 | Relegation to Liga 3 |

Source: Standings Liga 2 Group Barat
Rules for classification: 1) Points; 2) Head-to-head; 3) Goal difference; 4) Goals scored; 5) Drawing.
(P) Promoted; (R) Relegated
Notes:

| Home \ Away | BBU | BDG | CLG | SER | BAT | RAJ | PTA | CLP | CMS | MED | RIA | SRI |
|---|---|---|---|---|---|---|---|---|---|---|---|---|
| Babel United | — | 2–1 | 3–0 | 4–1 | 1–1 | 1–0 | 0–1 | 1–3 | 2–1 | 1–0 | 0–2 | 2–1 |
| Bandung United | 0–1 | — | 1–1 | 0–3 | 4–0 | 0–3 | 1–1 | 0–1 | 2–1 | 1–1 | 0–0 | 2–2 |
| Cilegon United | 1–0 | 2–1 | — | 2–0 | 1–0 | 2–0 | 0–2 | 1–1 | 2–1 | 3–0 | 4–0 | 0–0 |
| Perserang | 2–0 | 2–1 | 1–0 | — | 2–0 | 1–0 | 0–2 | 2–0 | 1–0 | 2–1 | 2–1 | 0–1 |
| Persibat | 1–1 | 2–1 | 2–1 | 0–0 | — | 1–0 | 2–2 | 3–2 | 3–2 | 0–1 | 3–0 | 0–1 |
| Persiraja | 4–1 | 2–1 | 2–1 | 2–1 | 4–1 | — | 1–0 | 2–1 | 3–1 | 2–0 | 2–1 | 1–0 |
| Persita | 0–0 | 4–4 | 1–1 | 1–1 | 4–0 | 2–1 | — | 3–1 | 1–0 | 1–0 | 5–0 | 1–0 |
| PSCS | 2–0 | 3–0 | 3–0 | 1–0 | 1–0 | 3–2 | 1–0 | — | 4–0 | 0–0 | 1–1 | 1–1 |
| PSGC | 1–0 | 1–0 | 2–0 | 2–0 | 1–2 | 2–3 | 0–1 | 2–2 | — | 2–0 | 3–1 | 0–1 |
| PSMS | 4–1 | 3–1 | 0–1 | 3–2 | 3–1 | 1–0 | 1–0 | 1–0 | 2–1 | — | 0–0 | 1–1 |
| PSPS Riau | 0–2 | 1–0 | 2–1 | 1–1 | 3–0 (Note: PSSI Disciplinary Committee declared Persibat lost 3–0 to PSPS Riau because they didn't want to continue the match. The original score was 3–1 for PSPS Riau.) | 1–2 | 2–1 | 0–0 | 5–0 | 2–3 | — | 2–1 |
| Sriwijaya | 1–0 | 2–1 | 3–0 | 1–0 | 2–1 | 1–0 | 0–2 | 2–0 | 3–1 | 1–2 | 1–0 | — |

Source: Fixtures Liga 2
Legend: Blue = home team win; Yellow = draw; Red = away team win.
For upcoming matches, an "a" indicates there is an article about the rivalry between the two participants.

=== East region ===
| Pos | Team | Pld | W | D | L | GF | GA | GD | Pts | Qualification or relegation |
|---|---|---|---|---|---|---|---|---|---|---|
| 1 | Persik (C, P) | 20 | 9 | 6 | 5 | 26 | 15 | +11 | 33 | Advance to the second round |
| 2 | Persewar | 20 | 9 | 4 | 7 | 22 | 18 | +4 | 31 (Note: Head-to-head results: Martapura 1–1 Persewar; Persewar 1–1 Martapura.) | Advance to the second round |
| 3 | Martapura | 20 | 8 | 7 | 5 | 18 | 18 | 0 | 31 | Advance to the second round |
| 4 | Mitra Kukar | 20 | 8 | 6 | 6 | 17 | 17 | 0 | 30 (Note: Head-to-head results: Mitra Kukar 0–0 Persis; Persis 1–1 Mitra Kukar.) | Advance to the second round |
| 5 | Persis | 20 | 8 | 6 | 6 | 18 | 16 | +2 | 30 | |
| 6 | Sulut United | 20 | 8 | 5 | 7 | 22 | 17 | +5 | 29 | |
| 7 | PSIM | 20 | 9 | 0 | 11 | 21 | 23 | −2 | 27 (Note: Head-to-head results: Persiba 0–1 PSIM; PSIM 2–1 Persiba.) | |
| 8 | Persiba | 20 | 8 | 3 | 9 | 23 | 20 | +3 | 27 | |
| 9 | PSBS | 20 | 6 | 6 | 8 | 14 | 21 | −7 | 24 | |
| 10 | Madura (R) | 20 | 6 | 5 | 9 | 15 | 19 | −4 | 23 | Relegation to Liga 3 |
| 11 | Persatu (R) | 20 | 6 | 2 | 12 | 17 | 29 | −12 | 20 | Relegation to Liga 3 |

Source: Standings Liga 2 Group Timur
Rules for classification: 1) Points; 2) Head-to-head; 3) Goal difference; 4) Goals scored; 5) Drawing.
(C) Champions; (P) Promoted; (R) Relegated
Notes:

| Home \ Away | MAD | MTP | MKU | PTU | PWR | PBA | KDR | SOL | BIA | YOG | SUL |
|---|---|---|---|---|---|---|---|---|---|---|---|
| Madura | — | 0–2 | 1–2 | 3–1 | 1–1 | 1–0 | 1–1 | 0–1 | 0–0 | 2–0 | 1–0 |
| Martapura | 1–0 | — | 0–2 | 1–0 | 1–1 | 1–1 | 1–0 | 2–1 | 1–1 | 1–0 | 1–0 |
| Mitra Kukar | 0–1 | 1–1 | — | 1–0 | 1–0 | 1–2 | 0–0 | 0–0 | 1–0 | 1–0 | 1–0 |
| Persatu | 2–1 | 3–2 | 3–0 | — | 0–2 | 1–0 | 2–1 | 1–1 | 1–2 | 0–2 | 1–1 |
| Persewar | 2–1 | 1–1 | 2–1 | 1–0 | — | 1–1 | 2–0 | 2–0 | 1–3 | 3–1 | 1–0 |
| Persiba | 1–2 | 3–0 | 1–1 | 3–0 | 1–0 | — | 0–2 | 3–0 | 3–1 | 0–1 | 1–0 |
| Persik | 2–0 | 1–1 | 2–0 | 2–0 | 0–2 | 2–0 | — | 1–0 | 4–0 | 2–0 | 1–2 |
| Persis | 0–0 | 0–0 | 1–1 | 1–0 | 1–0 | 0–1 | 1–1 | — | 3–0 | 2–1 | 2–0 |
| PSBS | 1–0 | 0–1 | 0–0 | 0–1 | 1–0 | 2–1 | 0–0 | 0–1 | — | 1–0 | 0–0 |
| PSIM | 2–0 | 2–0 | 1–2 | 2–0 | 1–0 | 2–1 | 1–2 | 2–3 | 1–0 | — | 0–2 |
| Sulut United | 0–0 | 1–0 | 2–1 | 3–1 | 3–0 | 2–0 | 2–2 | 1–0 | 2–2 | 1–2 (Note: Sulut United hosted PSIM at Kapten I Wayan Dipta because they didn't have police permit to hold this match at Klabat.) | — |

Source: Fixtures Liga 2
Legend: Blue = home team win; Yellow = draw; Red = away team win.
For upcoming matches, an "a" indicates there is an article about the rivalry between the two participants.

== Second round ==
This round was played on 9–18 November 2019. Eight teams competed in this round. All groups was played on a single-game round-robin home tournament. The winners and runner-ups from each group advanced to semi-finals.

=== Group X ===
- Five matches were held at Gelora Delta Stadium, Sidoarjo and one match was held at Gelora Joko Samudro Stadium, Gresik.
- Times listed are UTC+7.

| Pos | Team | Pld | W | D | L | GF | GA | GD | Pts | Qualification |
|---|---|---|---|---|---|---|---|---|---|---|
| 1 | Persiraja | 3 | 1 | 2 | 0 | 4 | 2 | +2 | 5 | Advance to the semi-finals |
| 2 | Sriwijaya | 3 | 1 | 2 | 0 | 2 | 1 | +1 | 5 | Advance to the semi-finals |
| 3 | Persewar | 3 | 0 | 2 | 1 | 4 | 5 | −1 | 2 | |
| 4 | Mitra Kukar | 3 | 0 | 2 | 1 | 3 | 5 | −2 | 2 | |

Source: Standings Liga 2 Group X
9 November 2019
15:30

| Persiraja | 2–0 | Mitra Kukar |
|---|---|---|
| Abu Bakar 26'; Husnuzhon 39' | Report |

Gelora Delta Stadium, Sidoarjo
Attendance: 101
Referee: Sance Lawita
9 November 2019
19:00

| Sriwijaya | 1–0 | Persewar |
|---|---|---|
| Ihwan 2' | Report |

Gelora Delta Stadium, Sidoarjo
Attendance: 354
Referee: Choirudin

13 November 2019
15:30

| Mitra Kukar | 1–1 | Sriwijaya |
|---|---|---|
| Firly 22' | Report | Ambrizal 84' (pen.) |

Gelora Delta Stadium, Sidoarjo
Attendance: 182
Referee: Parizon
13 November 2019
19:00

| Persewar | 2–2 | Persiraja |
|---|---|---|
| Ronald 34'; Krismon 53' | Report | Husnuzhon 16'; Abu Bakar 19' |

Gelora Delta Stadium, Sidoarjo
Attendance: 234
Referee: Gedion. F. Dapaherang

16 November 2019
15:30

| Mitra Kukar | 2–2 | Persewar |
|---|---|---|
| Rafli 3'; Atep 55' | Report | Balinsa 28'; Ronald 37' |

Gelora Delta Stadium, Sidoarjo
Attendance: 90
Referee: Sance Lawita
16 November 2019
15:30

| Persiraja | 0–0 | Sriwijaya |
|---|---|---|
| | Report |

Gelora Joko Samudro Stadium, Gresik
Attendance: 106
Referee: Syaiful Arif

=== Group Y ===
- Five matches were held at Gelora Sriwijaya Stadium, Palembang and one match was held at Bumi Sriwijaya Stadium, Palembang.
- Times listed are UTC+7.

| Pos | Team | Pld | W | D | L | GF | GA | GD | Pts | Qualification |
|---|---|---|---|---|---|---|---|---|---|---|
| 1 | Persita | 3 | 2 | 0 | 1 | 5 | 4 | +1 | 6 | Advance to the semi-finals |
| 2 | Persik | 3 | 1 | 2 | 0 | 2 | 1 | +1 | 5 | Advance to the semi-finals |
| 3 | PSMS | 3 | 1 | 1 | 1 | 4 | 4 | 0 | 4 | |
| 4 | Martapura | 3 | 0 | 1 | 2 | 3 | 5 | −2 | 1 | |

Source: Standings Liga 2 Group Y
10 November 2019
15:30

| Persik | 1–1 | PSMS |
|---|---|---|
| Galih 45+2' | Report | Eki 83' (pen.) |

Gelora Sriwijaya Stadium, Palembang
Attendance: 725
Referee: Abdullah
10 November 2019
19:00

| Martapura | 2–3 | Persita |
|---|---|---|
| Aibekob 12'; Radiansyah 40' | Report | Chandra 27'; Redi 75', 85' |

Gelora Sriwijaya Stadium, Palembang
Attendance: 119
Referee: Zetman Pangaribuan

14 November 2019
15:30

| PSMS | 2–1 | Martapura |
|---|---|---|
| Yudha 25'; Bruno 64' | Report | Radiansyah 76' (pen.) |

Gelora Sriwijaya Stadium, Palembang
Attendance: 118
Referee: Steven Yubel Poli
14 November 2019
19:00

| Persita | 0–1 | Persik |
|---|---|---|
| | Report | Edo 84' |

Gelora Sriwijaya Stadium, Palembang
Attendance: 99
Referee: Ginanjar Rahman Latief

18 November 2019
15:30

| PSMS | 1–2 | Persita |
|---|---|---|
| Siringoringo 8' | Report | Al Achya 43'; Redi 87' |

Gelora Sriwijaya Stadium, Palembang
Attendance: 241
Referee: Sigit Budiyanto
18 November 2019
15:30

| Persik | 0–0 | Martapura |
|---|---|---|
| | Report |

Bumi Sriwijaya Stadium, Palembang
Attendance: 76
Referee: Bardan Landihae

== Knockout round ==
All times listed below are UTC+8.

=== Bracket ===
Semi-finals
22 November – Gianyar
Sriwijaya | 0 (2)
Persita (pen.) | 0 (3)
22 November – Gianyar
Persik (pen.) | 0 (5)
Persiraja | 0 (4)

Final
25 November – Gianyar
Persita | 2
Persik | 3
Third place
25 November – Gianyar
Sriwijaya | 0
Persiraja | 1

=== Semi-finals ===
22 November 2019
16:00

| Sriwijaya | 0–0 (a.e.t.) | Persita |
|---|---|---|
| | Report |
Penalties
| Ambrizal (penalty missed); Zulkifli (penalty missed); Airlangga (penalty scored); Nabar (penalty scored); Alom (penalty missed) | 2–3 | (penalty scored) Banowo; (penalty missed) Asri; (penalty scored) Gigis; (penalty scored) Amarzukih |

Kapten I Wayan Dipta Stadium, Gianyar
Attendance: 442
Referee: Zetman Pangaribuan
22 November 2019
20:00

| Persik | 0–0 (a.e.t.) | Persiraja |
|---|---|---|
| | Report |
Penalties
| Galih (penalty scored); Otto (penalty scored); Sanjaya (penalty scored); Edo (penalty scored); Obet (penalty missed); Wimba (penalty scored) | 5–4 | (penalty scored) Defri; (penalty scored) Abu Bakar; (penalty missed) Tri; (penalty scored) Ikhwani; (penalty scored) Andika; (penalty missed) Husnuzhon |

Kapten I Wayan Dipta Stadium, Gianyar
Attendance: 1,237
Referee: Gedion. F. Dapaherang

=== Third place ===
25 November 2019
16:00

| Sriwijaya | 0–1 | Persiraja |
|---|---|---|
| | Report | Assanur 53' |

Kapten I Wayan Dipta Stadium, Gianyar
Attendance: 125
Referee: Sigit Budiyanto

=== Final ===
25 November 2019
20:00

| Persita | 2–3 | Persik |
|---|---|---|
| M. Roby 24'; S. Arvani 38' | Report | R. Prahalabenta 11'; S. Wijaya 14'; W.S. Fanosa 90+1' |

Kapten I Wayan Dipta Stadium, Gianyar
Attendance: 3,656
Referee: Sance Lawita

== Top goalscorers ==
| Rank | Player | Club | Goals |
|---|---|---|---|
| 1 | (Indonesia) Sirvi Arvani | Persita | 14 |
| 2 | (Indonesia) Assanur Rijal | Persiraja | 12 |
| 3 | (Indonesia) Rezam Baskoro | Bandung United | 10 |
| 3 | (Indonesia) Ahmad Ihwan | Sriwijaya | 10 |
| 5 | (Indonesia) Septian Bagaskara | Persik | 9 |
| 5 | (Indonesia) Chandra Waskito | Persita | 9 |
| 5 | (Indonesia) Cristian Gonzáles | PSIM | 9 |
| 5 | (Indonesia) Ilham Fathoni | PSMS | 9 |
| 9 | (Indonesia) Hari Habrian | Perserang | 8 |

== See also ==
- 2019 Liga 1
- 2019 Liga 3
- 2018–19 Piala Indonesia
