= Persiraja Banda Aceh =

Association football team in Indonesia

- Full name: Persatuan Sepakbola Indonesia Kutaraja
- Nicknames: Laskar Rencong (Rencong Warriors); Harimau Banda (The Banda Tigers)
- Short name: PRJ; PSRJ; ACH
- Founded: 28 July 1957; 69 years ago
- Ground: H. Dimurthala Stadium
- Capacity: 7,000
- Owner: PT Persiraja Lantak Laju
- President: Nazaruddin Dek Gam
- Head coach: Jaya Hartono
- League: Championship
- 2025–26: 5th (1st Group)
- Website: persiraja.id
Home colours	Away colours

Persatuan Sepakbola Indonesia Kutaraja, commonly known as Persiraja, is an Indonesian professional football club based in Banda Aceh, Aceh. They currently compete in the Championship. They play their home matches either at Harapan Bangsa Stadium or H. Dimurthala Stadium. They became champion of Perserikatan in 1980.

== History ==
Persiraja Banda Aceh was founded as a semi-professional team on 28 July 1957, initiated by PSSI. The name change from previous Persib Banda to its current name is unknown to the public. In the early formation of this club, the club's headquarters are located at Blang Padang Field, before being moved to the H. Dimurthala Stadium in Lampineung. At the beginning, since its inception, there's nothing special from this club. The club is still under the shadow of PSMS Medan who previously was one of the strongest teams in Indonesia. In the effort for finding the talented players, the team is making a Bonden or another term for the academy.

During the period between 1957 until 1974, there was no great achievement to be proud of. Until finally in 1975, Persiraja successfully overcome the shadows of PSMS Medan. In the 1974–75 season of PSSI National Championship western region, Persiraja successfully become champion by beating strongest club from Sumatra. At that time, Persiraja successfully topped the final standings with 11 points and goal difference 31–10 (21). Thus, Persiraja were advance to the national round of 1975–1978 PSSI National Championship with PSMS Medan, PSL Langkat, and PS Bangka. At the beginning of its participation, Persiraja broke through until reached the top 8. Persiraja also began to be known by everyone in the country. In the following season, Persiraja managed to increase their ranking to top 5. Persiraja could have been relegated in 1979, but PSSI did prevented it by adding a team so there were total of six teams. Finally, in 1980, Persiraja successfully become a national champion by beating Persipura Jayapura 3–1 in the final game held in Gelora Senayan Stadium (former name of Gelora Bung Karno Stadium). In the end, Persiraja have to wait for 23 years since 1957 to win the title in the national football arena.

== Rivalries ==
Persiraja used to have a rivalry with fellow Aceh club, PSAP Sigli. This rivalry is usually called as the Classic Aceh Derby. Their matches were always in hot atmosphere. In 2014, PSAP Sigli goalkeeper, Agus Rahman, made a harsh tackle on Persiraja striker, Akli Fairuz. Fairuz suffered bladder leakage and, a few days after the match, died from his internal injuries due to that tackle. He received a year suspension given by PSSI. Nowadays, since Persiraja and PSAP Sigli are no longer in the same league level, the rivalry has cooled down. In addition, Persiraja also have a rivalry with another Aceh clubs, such as PSBL Langsa and PSLS Lhokseumawe.

Apart from that, Persiraja also has a long history of rivalry with PSMS Medan which has been going on since the Perserikatan era. Matches have been tense and there have been violent incidents between supporters. The rivalry still continues today.

== Supporters ==
Most of spectators in every Persiraja games are not affiliated with any supporter community and go to stadium just to enjoy the game. However, Persiraja have relatively sizeable numbers of fanatic supporter community named SKULL, which was established in 2007. The name is an abbreviation of Suporter Kutaraja Untuk Lantak Laju (en: Kutaraja Supporters for Lantak Laju). They used to have rivalry and conflict with "The LAN" (Laskar Aneuk Nanggroe), which is the supporter community of other Aceh's football club, PSAP Sigli. However the two supporter communities ended the conflict in 2014.

As time went on, there was another group of supporters who supported Persiraja with the concept of "ultras" under the name "Laskar Rencong Mania" and occupied the south stand of H. Dimurthala Stadium. Although they were ultras, the group's colors strangely were orange, just like SKULL's, which generally contrasted with black, the customary color of any football ultras group around the world. But after the season ended and the next season went on, the existence of the supporters group seemed to abruptly vanished. Ahead of the new season, a new supporters group called "Ultras Persiraja" and also occupied the south stand of the stadium. This time the official color of the outfit they were wearing was black, just like any other ultras group.

== Ownership ==
Like most Perserikatan clubs, Persiraja had been funded by the local municipality. However, according to new ordinance by Indonesian Minister of Internal Affair in 2017, the local municipalities are no longer allowed to give any fund support to Indonesian professional clubs, which means for all clubs in Liga 1 and Liga 2, including Persiraja. Therefore, in March 2017, the management of Persiraja established a private company. Nazaruddin, a local businessman, bought most shares, forming PT Persiraja Lantak Laju, and became the club's president.

On 22 August 2022, Nazzarudin Dek Gam has resigned from his position as president club and his position was given to Zulfikar Syahabuddin who is one of the local businessmen who is active in religious activities such as congregational dawn safaris and as a lecturer.

Ahead of the next season's Liga 2, Nazaruddin Dek Gam took back ownership of the club from the previous management after experiencing unsatisfactory results in the previous season.

== Club ranking ==
=== World ===
As of 19 October 2025

Current rank	Country	Club	Points
2915	(Bosnia and Herzegovina)	OFK Gradina	1196
2916	(Algeria)	WA Tlemcen	1196
2917	(Indonesia)	Persiraja Banda Aceh	1195
2918	(Wales)	Caersws	1195
2919	(Jordan)	Sahab SC	1195

=== AFC ===
As of 19 October 2025

Current rank	Country	Club	Points
399	(United Arab Emirates)	Dubai CSC	1197
400	(United Arab Emirates)	Al Orooba	1196
401	(Indonesia)	Persiraja Banda Aceh	1195
402	(Jordan)	Sahab SC	1195
403	(Jordan)	That Ras SC	1194

== Players ==
=== Current squad ===
As of 7 September 2026

Note: Flags indicate national team as defined under FIFA eligibility rules; some limited exceptions apply. Players may hold more than one non-FIFA nationality.

No.	Pos.	Nation	Player
1	GK	IDN	Andriyas Francisco
3	DF	BRA	Daniel Alemão
4	DF	IDN	Said Qusairy
5	MF	IDN	Muharrir
7	FW	IDN	Indra Arya
8	MF	IDN	Andhika Maulana
9	FW	CIV	Djakaridja Traoré
10	MF	URU	Martín Cháves
11	FW	IDN	Pitian Husni
12	GK	IDN	Aditya Arya
13	DF	IDN	Nabil Muannisi
14	MF	IDN	Jayus Hariono (on loan from Arema)
15	MF	IDN	Mujahidin Ilyas
16	MF	IDN	Faris Adit
17	FW	IDN	Dwiki Mardiyanto (on loan from Arema)
18	DF	IDN	Aditya Angga

No.	Pos.	Nation	Player
19	MF	IDN	Ridha Umami
20	FW	IDN	Ilham Armaiyn
21	MF	IDN	Muhammad Fazri
22	GK	IDN	Gede Aditya
23	DF	IDN	Raffa Fathary
25	MF	IDN	Azyah Madilesa
27	FW	IDN	Khalidin
29	FW	IDN	Ibrahim Faisal
30	FW	IDN	Faiz Wafi
31	GK	IDN	Marcel Aulia
57	MF	IDN	Narendra Tegar
67	DF	IDN	Rangga Bolang (on loan from Java United)
70	FW	IDN	Tedja Kusuma
77	FW	IDN	Risky Safri (on loan from Java United)
87	DF	IDN	Wahyu Jati
88	MF	IDN	Rafif Putra

=== Other players under contract ===
Note: Flags indicate national team as defined under FIFA eligibility rules; some limited exceptions apply. Players may hold more than one non-FIFA nationality.

No.	Pos.	Nation	Player

=== Out on loan ===
Note: Flags indicate national team as defined under FIFA eligibility rules; some limited exceptions apply. Players may hold more than one non-FIFA nationality.

No.	Pos.	Nation	Player

== Club officials ==
Position	Name
Club President	(Indonesia) Nazaruddin Dek Gam
Club Vice President	(Indonesia) Ari Nanda
General Secretary	(Indonesia) Rahmat Djailani
Team Manager	(Indonesia) Ridha Mafdhul
Assistant Team Manager	(Indonesia) Edi Supriyadi
CEO	Vacant
COO	Vacant
Head coach	(Indonesia) Muhammad Ridwan
Assistant Head Coach	(Indonesia) Edi Hafid Murtado
Goalkeeper Coach	(Indonesia) Zulkarnain Zakaria
Physical Coach	(Indonesia) Asep Suryadi
Team Doctor	(Indonesia) Rizki Maulana
Masseur	(Indonesia) Hamdani
Security Officer	(Indonesia) Marzuki
Physiotherapist	(Indonesia) Rianda Simehate
Analyst	(Indonesia) Naufal Arkan Nasyif
Kit Man	(Indonesia) Dedi Chandra
Kit Man	(Indonesia) Munanda Faisal
Media Officer	(Indonesia) Ariful Usman

== Stadium ==
Persiraja currently plays their home matches at H. Dimurthala Stadium in Banda Aceh. As Persib Banda (not to be confused with Persib Bandung), Persiraja first played at the Blang Padang Football Field in Kampung Baru, Baiturrahman. They also played some selected matches at Harapan Bangsa Stadium in Lhong Raya.

After securing promotion to 2020 Liga 1, Persiraja decided to move their home ground to Harapan Bangsa Stadium which had better facilities because the H. Dimurthala Stadium's facilities are not adequate to meet PSSI standard for Liga 1 matches.

Persiraja temporarily based themself at the Langsa Stadium in Langsa during the 2023–24 Liga 2's championship round in early of 2024, due to both H. Dimurthala Stadium and Harapan Bangsa Stadium were chosen by the government through Ministry of Public Works (then the Ministry of Public Works and Public Housing) to be fully renovated and meet the FIFA standard after Aceh along with North Sumatra was chosen to host the 2024 Pekan Olahraga Nasional.

== Jersey and sponsors ==
The colour of team home jersey for ground player is orange, which refers to the colour of club's logo. For the 2020 Liga 1, MBB is the kit supplier for Persiraja, whilst the sponsors on jersey are Dek Gam Fondation, Bank Aceh, Lion Parcel, Extra Joss, PDAM Tirta Daroy and The Atjeh Connection.

== Past seasons ==
The following table is Persiraja achievement in Indonesian league system since Liga Indonesia era

Season	Div.	Tie.	Final position	Piala Indonesia^{f}	I-League Cup
1994–95	Premier Division^{a}	1	6th in West Zone First Round	not held	not held
1995–96	Premier Division^{a}	1	7th in West Zone First Round	not held	not held
1996–97	Premier Division^{a}	1	3rd in Group A Second Round	not held	not held
1997–98	Premier Division^{a}	1	3rd in West Zone First Round (competition did not finish)	not held	not held
1998–99	Premier Division^{a}	1	Relegation Play-off	not held	not held
1999–20	Premier Division^{a}	1	7th place in West Zone First Round	not held	not held
2001	Premier Division^{a}	1	12th place in West Zone First Round (Relegated)	not held	not held
2002	First Division	2	6th place in Second Round	not held	not held
2003	First Division	2	5th place in Second Round	not held	not held
2004	First Division	2	8th place in West Zone	not held	not held
2005	First Division	2	First Round^{d}	Did not participate	not held
2006	First Division	2	2nd place in Second Round (Promoted)	1st Round	not held
2007–08	Premier Division	1	17th in West Zone First Round (Relegated)^{e}	1st Round	not held
2008–09	Premier Division	2	6th in Group I First Round	1st Round	not held
2009–10	Premier Division	2	7th in Group I First Round	did not participate	not held
2010–11	Premier Division	2	Runner-up (Promoted)	not held	not held
2011–12	IPL^{b}	1	7th	3rd Round	not held
2013	IPL^{b}	1	5th in Group L Relegation Play-off Round (Relegated)	not held	not held
2014	Premier Division	2	6th in Group 1 First Round	not held	not held
2015	Premier Division	2	Competition did not finish	not held	not held
2016	ISC B^{c}	2	4th in Group A Second Round	not held	not held
2017	Liga 2	2	1st in Group E Relegation Play-off Round	not held	not held
2018	Liga 2	2	3rd in Group B Second Round	1st Round	not held
2019	Liga 2	2	3rd Place (Promoted)	1st Round	not held
2020	Liga 1	1	7th (competition did not finish)	not held	not held
2021–22	Liga 1	1	18th (Relegated)	not held	not held
2022–23	Liga 2	2	(competition did not finish)	not held	not held
2023–24	Liga 2	2	4th Place	not held	not held
2024–25	Liga 2	2	3rd in Group X Championship Round	not held	not held
2025–26	Championship	2	5th in Group 1	not held	not held
2026–27	Championship	2	TBD	not held	TBD

Key

- Div. = Name of Division Played
- Tie. = Tier level in Indonesian league pyramid at the time of competition

Notes

- ^aFrom 1994–95 to 2007–08, Liga Indonesia Premier Division (not to be confused with Indonesian Premier League or IPL) was the first-tier league in Indonesian league pyramid, before became the second-tier league (present day: Liga 2). In 2008, Indonesian Super League replaced it as the first-tier league in Indonesian league pyramid.
- ^bIndonesian Premier League (IPL) was a fully professional football competition as the shared top tier of the football league pyramid in Indonesia with the Indonesia Super League within 2011–2013 before the two leagues merged for the 2014 season.
- ^cThe 2016 ISC B was a football competition that replaced the temporarily suspended LI Premier Division.
- ^d Persiraja should be relegated this season, but had dispensation due to 2004 Indian Ocean earthquake
- ^e 2007–08 was the last season of Liga Indonesia Premier Division played as first-tier league. Only 20 out of 38 clubs were then qualified to 2008–09 Indonesia Super League. The rest 18 clubs were considered relegated and then played in 2008–09 Liga Indonesia Premier Division as the second-tier league.
- ^f Since PSSI started Piala Indonesia as the professional cup competition in 2005, the competition has not been held in annual basis.

== Honours ==
- Perserikatan
  - Winners (1): 1980
- Liga Indonesia Premier Division/Liga 2
  - Runners-up (1): 2010–11
  - Third place (1): 2019
