= List of Indonesian football transfers summer 2024 =

The 2024 Indonesian football summer transfer window runs from 12 June to 3 September 2024 based on FIFA TMS period. This list includes transfers featuring at least one club from either the Liga 1 or Liga 2 that were completed after the end of the last transfer period.

All head coach and clubs without a flag are Indonesian.

== Liga 1 ==
=== Arema ===
Head coach: (Brazil) Joel Cornelli

In: Note: Flags indicate national team as defined under FIFA eligibility rules; some limited exceptions apply. Players may hold more than one non-FIFA nationality.

No.	Pos.	Nation	Player
—	GK	IDN	Andrian Casvari (from Madura United)
—	DF	IDN	Anwar Rifai (from Madura United)
—	DF	IDN	Bayu Saputra (from PSBS)
—	DF	KOR	Choi Bo-Kyung (from (South Korea) Suwon FC)
—	DF	IDN	Iksan Lestaluhu (from Madura United)
—	FW	IDN	Salim Tuharea (from Madura United)

Out: Note: Flags indicate national team as defined under FIFA eligibility rules; some limited exceptions apply. Players may hold more than one non-FIFA nationality.

No.	Pos.	Nation	Player
—	GK	IDN	Teguh Amiruddin (to Semen Padang)
—	DF	IDN	Asyraq Gufron (to PSIM)
—	DF	IDN	Bagas Adi Nugroho (to Bali United)
—	MF	IDN	Evan Dimas (to Persik)

=== Bali United ===
Head coach: (Brazil) Stefano Cugurra

In: Note: Flags indicate national team as defined under FIFA eligibility rules; some limited exceptions apply. Players may hold more than one non-FIFA nationality.

No.	Pos.	Nation	Player
—	GK	IDN	Fitrul Dwi Rustapa (from Persib)
—	DF	IDN	Bagas Adi Nugroho (from Arema)
—	MF	AUS	Brandon Wilson (from (Vietnam) Hanoi)
—	MF	JPN	Mitsuru Maruoka (from RANS Nusantara)

Out: Note: Flags indicate national team as defined under FIFA eligibility rules; some limited exceptions apply. Players may hold more than one non-FIFA nationality.

No.	Pos.	Nation	Player
—	DF	IDN	Ardi Idrus (loaned to Persebaya)
—	DF	IDN	Haudi Abdillah (to Madura United)
—	DF	IDN	Jajang Mulyana (to Persiku)
—	MF	PLE	Mohammed Rashid (to Persebaya)

=== Barito Putera ===
Head coach: Rahmad Darmawan

In: Note: Flags indicate national team as defined under FIFA eligibility rules; some limited exceptions apply. Players may hold more than one non-FIFA nationality.

No.	Pos.	Nation	Player
—	GK	IDN	Muhammad Ridho (from Madura United)
—	GK	IDN	Satria Tama (from Madura United)
—	DF	BRA	Lucão (from PSIS)
—	DF	IDN	Novan Sasongko (from Madura United)
—	MF	GAB	Lévy Madinda (from (Malaysia) Johor Darul Ta'zim)
—	MF	BRA	Lucas Morelatto (from (China) Nantong Zhiyun)

Out: Note: Flags indicate national team as defined under FIFA eligibility rules; some limited exceptions apply. Players may hold more than one non-FIFA nationality.

No.	Pos.	Nation	Player
—	DF	IDN	Frendi Saputra (to Semen Padang)

=== Borneo Samarinda ===
Head coach: (Netherlands) Pieter Huistra

In: Note: Flags indicate national team as defined under FIFA eligibility rules; some limited exceptions apply. Players may hold more than one non-FIFA nationality.

No.	Pos.	Nation	Player
11	DF	IDN	Gavin Kwan (from Persis)
—	DF	IDN	Erwin Gutawa (from PSM)
—	DF	BRA	Ronaldo Rodrigues (from (Portugal) Anadia)
—	MF	BRA	Berguinho (from (Brazil) Volta Redonda)
—	MF	BDI	Christophe Nduwarugira (from (Portugal) Académico Viseu)
—	FW	IDN	Ari Maring (from PSIM)
—	FW	BRA	Léo Gaúcho (from (Latvia) Valmiera)

Out: Note: Flags indicate national team as defined under FIFA eligibility rules; some limited exceptions apply. Players may hold more than one non-FIFA nationality.

No.	Pos.	Nation	Player
—	DF	IDN	Rizky Dwi Febrianto (to Persis)
—	MF	IDN	Arya Gerryan (to PSIM)

=== Dewa United ===
Head coach: (Netherlands) Jan Olde Riekerink

In: Note: Flags indicate national team as defined under FIFA eligibility rules; some limited exceptions apply. Players may hold more than one non-FIFA nationality.

No.	Pos.	Nation	Player
—	DF	IDN	Reva Adi Utama (from Persebaya)
—	MF	JPN	Taisei Marukawa (from PSIS)

Out: Note: Flags indicate national team as defined under FIFA eligibility rules; some limited exceptions apply. Players may hold more than one non-FIFA nationality.

No.	Pos.	Nation	Player
—	DF	IDN	Mochammad Zaenuri (to Persis)
—	MF	IDN	Robi Darwis (return to Persib)
—	MF	GRE	Dimitris Kolovos

=== Madura United ===
Head coach: Widodo Cahyono Putro

In: Note: Flags indicate national team as defined under FIFA eligibility rules; some limited exceptions apply. Players may hold more than one non-FIFA nationality.

No.	Pos.	Nation	Player
—	DF	IDN	Haudi Abdillah (from Bali United)

Out: Note: Flags indicate national team as defined under FIFA eligibility rules; some limited exceptions apply. Players may hold more than one non-FIFA nationality.

No.	Pos.	Nation	Player
—	GK	IDN	Andrian Casvari (to Arema)
—	GK	IDN	Muhammad Ridho (to Barito Putera)
—	GK	IDN	Satria Tama (to Barito Putera)
—	DF	IDN	Anwar Rifai (to Arema)
—	DF	IDN	Dodi Alekvan Djin (to Semen Padang)
—	DF	IDN	Iksan Lestaluhu (to Arema)
—	DF	IDN	Novan Sasongko (to Barito Putera)
—	MF	MEX	Francisco Rivera (to Persebaya)
—	MF	BRA	Jaja (to Dewa United)
—	MF	IDN	Malik Risaldi (to Persebaya)
—	MF	IDN	Ricki Ariansyah (to Semen Padang)
—	FW	IDN	Salim Tuharea (to Arema)

=== Malut United ===
Head coach: Imran Nahumarury

In: Note: Flags indicate national team as defined under FIFA eligibility rules; some limited exceptions apply. Players may hold more than one non-FIFA nationality.

No.	Pos.	Nation	Player
69	MF	IDN	Manahati Lestusen (from Persikabo 1973)
—	GK	IDN	Muhammad Fahri (from Persiraja)
—	DF	BRA	Cássio Scheid (from Ararat-Armenia)
—	DF	IDN	Fredyan Wahyu (from PSIS)
—	DF	IDN	Safrudin Tahar (from PSM)
—	DF	IDN	Wahyu Prasetyo (from PSIS)
—	DF	IDN	Yance Sayuri (from PSM)
—	MF	POR	Adriano Castanheira (from Ararat-Armenia)
—	MF	ARG	Jorge Correa (from (Portugal) Torreense)
—	MF	JPN	Tatsuro Nagamatsu (from (Malta) Santa Lucia)
—	MF	ARM	Wbeymar Angulo (from Ararat-Armenia)
—	MF	IDN	Yakob Sayuri (from PSM)
—	FW	PAR	Diego Martínez (from (Paraguay) General Caballero)
—	FW	IDN	Yandi Sofyan (from Persikabo 1973)

Out: Note: Flags indicate national team as defined under FIFA eligibility rules; some limited exceptions apply. Players may hold more than one non-FIFA nationality.

No.	Pos.	Nation	Player

=== Persebaya ===
Head coach: (Northern Ireland) Paul Munster

In: Note: Flags indicate national team as defined under FIFA eligibility rules; some limited exceptions apply. Players may hold more than one non-FIFA nationality.

No.	Pos.	Nation	Player
—	DF	IDN	Ardi Idrus (loan from Bali United)
—	DF	MNE	Slavko Damjanović (from (India) Bengaluru)
—	MF	POR	Gilson Costa (from (Lebanon) Nejmeh)
—	MF	MEX	Francisco Rivera (from Madura United)
—	MF	IDN	Malik Risaldi (from Madura United)
—	MF	PLE	Mohammed Rashid (from Bali United)
—	FW	POR	Flávio Silva (from Persik)

Out: Note: Flags indicate national team as defined under FIFA eligibility rules; some limited exceptions apply. Players may hold more than one non-FIFA nationality.

No.	Pos.	Nation	Player
—	DF	IDN	Reva Adi Utama (to Dewa United)
—	MF	IDN	Muhammad Iqbal (to Semen Padang)
—	MF	IDN	Ripal Wahyudi (to Persis)
—	FW	IDN	Wildan Ramdhani (to PSIS)
—	DF	IDN	George Brown (to Persita)

=== Persib ===
Head coach: (Croatia) Bojan Hodak

In: Note: Flags indicate national team as defined under FIFA eligibility rules; some limited exceptions apply. Players may hold more than one non-FIFA nationality.

No.	Pos.	Nation	Player
—	DF	CRO	Mateo Kocijan (from (Albania) Partizani Tirana)
—	MF	IDN	Robi Darwis (return from Dewa United)
—	MF	ESP	Tyronne del Pino (return from (Thailand) Ratchaburi)

Out: Note: Flags indicate national team as defined under FIFA eligibility rules; some limited exceptions apply. Players may hold more than one non-FIFA nationality.

No.	Pos.	Nation	Player
—	GK	IDN	Fitrul Dwi Rustapa (to Bali United)
—	DF	ESP	Alberto Rodríguez (to (India) Mohun Bagan)
—	MF	IDN	Arsan Makarin (to PSPS)
—	FW	IDN	Arham Darmawan (to PSM)

=== Persija ===
Head coach: (Spain) Carlos Peña

In: Note: Flags indicate national team as defined under FIFA eligibility rules; some limited exceptions apply. Players may hold more than one non-FIFA nationality.

No.	Pos.	Nation	Player
—	MF	IDN	Witan Sulaeman (return from Bhayangkara Presisi)

Out: Note: Flags indicate national team as defined under FIFA eligibility rules; some limited exceptions apply. Players may hold more than one non-FIFA nationality.

No.	Pos.	Nation	Player
—	DF	IDN	Maman Abdurahman (to PSPS)

=== Persik ===
Head coach: (Brazil) Marcelo Rospide

In: Note: Flags indicate national team as defined under FIFA eligibility rules; some limited exceptions apply. Players may hold more than one non-FIFA nationality.

No.	Pos.	Nation	Player
—	GK	IDN	Husna Al Malik (from Persikabo 1973)
—	DF	IDN	Didik Wahyu (from Persikabo 1973)
—	MF	IDN	Evan Dimas (from Arema)

Out: Note: Flags indicate national team as defined under FIFA eligibility rules; some limited exceptions apply. Players may hold more than one non-FIFA nationality.

No.	Pos.	Nation	Player
—	GK	IDN	Miswar Saputra (to Semen Padang)
—	FW	POR	Flávio Silva (to Persebaya)

=== Persis ===
Head coach: (Bosnia and Herzegovina) Milomir Šešlija

In: Note: Flags indicate national team as defined under FIFA eligibility rules; some limited exceptions apply. Players may hold more than one non-FIFA nationality.

No.	Pos.	Nation	Player
—	DF	IDN	Mochammad Zaenuri (from Dewa United)
—	DF	IDN	Rizky Dwi Febrianto (from Borneo Samarinda)
—	MF	IDN	Ripal Wahyudi (from Persebaya)

Out: Note: Flags indicate national team as defined under FIFA eligibility rules; some limited exceptions apply. Players may hold more than one non-FIFA nationality.

No.	Pos.	Nation	Player
—	DF	IDN	Arif Budiyono (to Semen Padang)
—	DF	IDN	Gavin Kwan (to Borneo Samarinda)
—	DF	IDN	Samuel Simanjuntak (to PSIM)

=== Persita ===
Head coach: (Brazil) Fabio Lefundes

In: Note: Flags indicate national team as defined under FIFA eligibility rules; some limited exceptions apply. Players may hold more than one non-FIFA nationality.

No.	Pos.	Nation	Player
—	DF	IDN	George Brown (from Persebaya)
—	DF	IDN	Ryuji Utomo (loan from Bali United)

Out: Note: Flags indicate national team as defined under FIFA eligibility rules; some limited exceptions apply. Players may hold more than one non-FIFA nationality.

No.	Pos.	Nation	Player

=== PSBS ===
Head coach: (Argentina) Juan Esnáider

In: Note: Flags indicate national team as defined under FIFA eligibility rules; some limited exceptions apply. Players may hold more than one non-FIFA nationality.

No.	Pos.	Nation	Player
—	DF	ARG	Julián Velázquez (from (Bolivia) Jorge Wilstermann)
—	MF	BRA	Jonata Machado (from (Bolivia) Jorge Wilstermann)
—	MF	JPN	Takuya Matsunaga (from (Kazakhstan) Elimai)
—	MF	VEN	Williams Lugo (loan from (Venezuela) Puerto Cabello)
—	FW	ARG	Abel Argañaraz (from (Andorra) Inter Escaldes)
—	FW	ARG	Gabriel Esparza (from (Bolivia) Jorge Wilstermann)

Out: Note: Flags indicate national team as defined under FIFA eligibility rules; some limited exceptions apply. Players may hold more than one non-FIFA nationality.

No.	Pos.	Nation	Player
—	DF	IDN	Bayu Setiawan (to Arema)
—	DF	IDN	Melcior Majefat (to Semen Padang)

=== PSIS ===
Head coach: (Malta) Gilbert Agius

In: Note: Flags indicate national team as defined under FIFA eligibility rules; some limited exceptions apply. Players may hold more than one non-FIFA nationality.

No.	Pos.	Nation	Player
—	DF	IDN	Rahmat Syawal (from Persas)
—	DF	ESP	Ruxi (from (Mexico) Mineros de Zacatecas)
—	FW	BDI	Sudi Abdallah (from (Libya) Alittihad Misurata)
—	FW	IDN	Wildan Ramdhani (from Persebaya)

Out: Note: Flags indicate national team as defined under FIFA eligibility rules; some limited exceptions apply. Players may hold more than one non-FIFA nationality.

No.	Pos.	Nation	Player
—	DF	IDN	Fredyan Wahyu (to Malut United)
—	DF	BRA	Lucão (to Barito Putera)
—	DF	IDN	Wahyu Prasetyo (to Malut United)
—	MF	IDN	Evan Dimas (return to Arema)
—	MF	JPN	Taisei Marukawa (to Dewa United)

=== PSM ===
Head coach: (Portugal) Bernardo Tavares

In: Note: Flags indicate national team as defined under FIFA eligibility rules; some limited exceptions apply. Players may hold more than one non-FIFA nationality.

No.	Pos.	Nation	Player
—	GK	IDN	Hilmansyah (from RANS Nusantara)
—	DF	BRA	Aloísio Neto (from (Portugal) Académica de Coimbra)
—	DF	IDN	Dimas Sukarno (from Gresik United)
—	DF	IDN	Syahrul Lasinari (from Persikabo 1973)
—	DF	BRA	Victor Luiz (from (Malta) Valletta)
—	MF	JPN	Daisuke Sakai (from (India) Kerala Blasters)
—	MF	IDN	Fahrul Aditia (from Bhayangkara Presisi)
—	FW	IDN	Arham Darmawan (from Persib)
—	FW	SVN	Nermin Haljeta (from (Austria) Floridsdorfer AC)

Out: Note: Flags indicate national team as defined under FIFA eligibility rules; some limited exceptions apply. Players may hold more than one non-FIFA nationality.

No.	Pos.	Nation	Player
—	DF	IDN	Erwin Gutawa (to Borneo Samarinda)
—	DF	IDN	Safrudin Tahar (to Malut United)
—	DF	IDN	Yance Sayuri (to Malut United)
—	MF	IDN	Yakob Sayuri (to Malut United)

=== PSS ===
Head coach: (Japan) Wagner Lopes

In: Note: Flags indicate national team as defined under FIFA eligibility rules; some limited exceptions apply. Players may hold more than one non-FIFA nationality.

No.	Pos.	Nation	Player
—	DF	IDN	Gilang Oktavana (from Deltras)
—	MF	BRA	Betinho (from (Brazil) Confiança)
—	MF	IDN	Paulo Sitanggang (from RANS Nusantara)

Out: Note: Flags indicate national team as defined under FIFA eligibility rules; some limited exceptions apply. Players may hold more than one non-FIFA nationality.

No.	Pos.	Nation	Player
—	FW	SSD	Ajak Riak (to (Moldova) Sheriff Tiraspol)

=== Semen Padang ===
Head coach: Hendri Susilo

In: Note: Flags indicate national team as defined under FIFA eligibility rules; some limited exceptions apply. Players may hold more than one non-FIFA nationality.

No.	Pos.	Nation	Player
20	GK	IDN	Diky Indriyana (from Persikabo 1973)
33	GK	IDN	Miswar Saputra (from Persik)
76	DF	IDN	Dodi Alekvan Djin (from Madura United)
90	FW	IDN	Ramadhan Madon (from Persiraja)
92	DF	IDN	Frendi Saputra (from Barito Putera)
—	GK	IDN	Teguh Amiruddin (from Arema)
—	DF	IDN	Arif Budiyono (from Persis)
—	DF	PAN	Jan Carlos Vargas (from (Panama) Tauro)
—	DF	IDN	Melcior Majefat (from PSBS)
—	DF	IDN	Miftah Anwar Sani (from Kalteng Putra)
—	DF	CRO	Tin Martić (from (Slovenia) Aluminij)
—	MF	IDN	Muhammad Iqbal (from Persebaya)
—	MF	ENG	Charlie Scott (from (Hong Kong) Kitchee)
—	MF	IDN	Ricki Ariansyah (from Madura United)
—	FW	IDN	Muhamad Ridwan (from Gresik United)

Out: Note: Flags indicate national team as defined under FIFA eligibility rules; some limited exceptions apply. Players may hold more than one non-FIFA nationality.

No.	Pos.	Nation	Player
—	MF	IDN	Roken Tampubolon (to PSIM)

== Liga 2 ==
=== Adhyaksa Farmel ===
Head coach: Ade Suhendra

In: Note: Flags indicate national team as defined under FIFA eligibility rules; some limited exceptions apply. Players may hold more than one non-FIFA nationality.

No.	Pos.	Nation	Player
—	DF	SRB	Ivan Marić (from (India) Aizawl)

Out: Note: Flags indicate national team as defined under FIFA eligibility rules; some limited exceptions apply. Players may hold more than one non-FIFA nationality.

No.	Pos.	Nation	Player

=== Bekasi City ===
Head coach: Widyantoro

In: Note: Flags indicate national team as defined under FIFA eligibility rules; some limited exceptions apply. Players may hold more than one non-FIFA nationality.

No.	Pos.	Nation	Player

Out: Note: Flags indicate national team as defined under FIFA eligibility rules; some limited exceptions apply. Players may hold more than one non-FIFA nationality.

No.	Pos.	Nation	Player
—	DF	IDN	Rio Hardiawan (to PSIM)
—	DF	IDN	Sunni Hizbullah (to PSIM)
—	MF	IDN	Adittia Gigis (return to Borneo Samarinda)
—	FW	IDN	Saldi Amiruddin (to PSIM)

=== Bhayangkara Presisi ===
Head coach: (Brazil) Gomes de Oliveira

In: Note: Flags indicate national team as defined under FIFA eligibility rules; some limited exceptions apply. Players may hold more than one non-FIFA nationality.

No.	Pos.	Nation	Player
—	DF	IDN	Ruben Sanadi (from PSBS)
—	FW	IDN	Ilija Spasojević (from Bali United)

Out: Note: Flags indicate national team as defined under FIFA eligibility rules; some limited exceptions apply. Players may hold more than one non-FIFA nationality.

No.	Pos.	Nation	Player
—	MF	IDN	Fahrul Aditia (to PSM)
—	MF	IDN	Witan Sulaeman (return to Persija)

=== Dejan ===
Head coach: Herman

In: Note: Flags indicate national team as defined under FIFA eligibility rules; some limited exceptions apply. Players may hold more than one non-FIFA nationality.

No.	Pos.	Nation	Player
—	FW	IDN	Silvio Escobar (from Persela)

Out: Note: Flags indicate national team as defined under FIFA eligibility rules; some limited exceptions apply. Players may hold more than one non-FIFA nationality.

No.	Pos.	Nation	Player

=== Deltras ===
Head coach: Bejo Sugiantoro

In: Note: Flags indicate national team as defined under FIFA eligibility rules; some limited exceptions apply. Players may hold more than one non-FIFA nationality.

No.	Pos.	Nation	Player

Out: Note: Flags indicate national team as defined under FIFA eligibility rules; some limited exceptions apply. Players may hold more than one non-FIFA nationality.

No.	Pos.	Nation	Player
—	DF	IDN	Gilang Oktavana (to PSS)

=== Gresik United ===
Head coach: Stefan Keeltjes

In: Note: Flags indicate national team as defined under FIFA eligibility rules; some limited exceptions apply. Players may hold more than one non-FIFA nationality.

No.	Pos.	Nation	Player
—	GK	IDN	Try Hamdani (from RANS Nusantara)
—	DF	IDN	Ade Kristiano (from Persis)
—	DF	UZB	Azamat Abdullayev (from Bangladesh Police)
—	DF	IDN	Aziiz Al Ghany (from Persikab)
—	DF	IDN	Egi Regiansyah (from Perserang)
—	DF	IDN	Indra Rianto (from Persipura)
—	DF	IDN	Joko Supriyanto (from PSIM)
—	DF	IDN	Putra Pradananta (from Persebaya)
—	DF	IDN	Samsul Arifin (from RANS Nusnatara)
—	DF	IDN	Soni Setiawan (from Bekasi City)
—	MF	IDN	Burhan Afiludin (from Persikab)
—	MF	IDN	Fadil Sausu (from Bali United)
—	MF	BRA	Renan Silva (from Persik)
—	DF	IDN	Didan Paulista (from Persis)
—	FW	IDN	Fahmi Al-Ayyubi (from Persijap)
—	FW	IDN	Kahar Muzakkar (from Persekat)
—	FW	IDN	Rosi Noprihanis (from Sulut United)

Out: Note: Flags indicate national team as defined under FIFA eligibility rules; some limited exceptions apply. Players may hold more than one non-FIFA nationality.

No.	Pos.	Nation	Player
—	DF	IDN	Dimas Sukarno (to PSM)
—	FW	IDN	Muhamad Ridwan (to Semen Padang)

=== Nusantara United ===
Head coach: Salahudin

In: Note: Flags indicate national team as defined under FIFA eligibility rules; some limited exceptions apply. Players may hold more than one non-FIFA nationality.

No.	Pos.	Nation	Player

Out: Note: Flags indicate national team as defined under FIFA eligibility rules; some limited exceptions apply. Players may hold more than one non-FIFA nationality.

No.	Pos.	Nation	Player
—	MF	IDN	Junda Irawan (to Persikas)
—	MF	IDN	Reycredo Beremanda (loaned to (Singapore) Balestier Khalsa)
—	FW	IDN	Muhammad Isa (to Persikas)

=== Persekat ===
Head coach: I Putu Gede

In: Note: Flags indicate national team as defined under FIFA eligibility rules; some limited exceptions apply. Players may hold more than one non-FIFA nationality.

No.	Pos.	Nation	Player
—	GK	IDN	Diaz Priambodo (from Persikota)
—	GK	IDN	Dimas Fani (from PSS)
—	DF	IDN	Fikri Irvanudin (from Persikota)
—	MF	IDN	Firman Januari (from Persikab)
—	MF	IDN	Kevin Armedyah (loan from Arema)
—	MF	IDN	Noval Junior Iskandar (from Persis)
—	MF	IDN	Reza Runtu Inda (from Tornado)
—	MF	IDN	Syarif Wijianto (from Malut United)
—	FW	IDN	Rifky Suryawan (from Bekasi City)

Out: Note: Flags indicate national team as defined under FIFA eligibility rules; some limited exceptions apply. Players may hold more than one non-FIFA nationality.

No.	Pos.	Nation	Player

=== Persela ===
Head coach: Vacant

In: Note: Flags indicate national team as defined under FIFA eligibility rules; some limited exceptions apply. Players may hold more than one non-FIFA nationality.

No.	Pos.	Nation	Player

Out: Note: Flags indicate national team as defined under FIFA eligibility rules; some limited exceptions apply. Players may hold more than one non-FIFA nationality.

No.	Pos.	Nation	Player
—	FW	IDN	Silvio Escobar (to Dejan)

=== Persewar ===
Head coach: Eduard Ivakdalam

In: Note: Flags indicate national team as defined under FIFA eligibility rules; some limited exceptions apply. Players may hold more than one non-FIFA nationality.

No.	Pos.	Nation	Player

Out: Note: Flags indicate national team as defined under FIFA eligibility rules; some limited exceptions apply. Players may hold more than one non-FIFA nationality.

No.	Pos.	Nation	Player

=== Persibo ===
Head coach: Regi Aditya Yonathan

In: Note: Flags indicate national team as defined under FIFA eligibility rules; some limited exceptions apply. Players may hold more than one non-FIFA nationality.

No.	Pos.	Nation	Player
—	DF	IDN	Alfin Tuasalamony (from Persela)
—	DF	IDN	Hadi Ardiansyah (from Semen Padang)
—	DF	IDN	Jajang Sukmara (from PSIM)
—	DF	IDN	Marthinus Isir (from PSBS)
—	MF	IDN	Reza Irfana (from Persikabo 1973)
—	FW	IDN	Azka Fauzi (from Persikota)
—	FW	IDN	Hendra Bayauw (from Malut United)
—	FW	IDN	Lerby Eliandry (from Madura United)
—	FW	IDN	Osas Saha (from PSBS)

Out: Note: Flags indicate national team as defined under FIFA eligibility rules; some limited exceptions apply. Players may hold more than one non-FIFA nationality.

No.	Pos.	Nation	Player

=== Persijap ===
Head coach: Vacant

In: Note: Flags indicate national team as defined under FIFA eligibility rules; some limited exceptions apply. Players may hold more than one non-FIFA nationality.

No.	Pos.	Nation	Player

Out: Note: Flags indicate national team as defined under FIFA eligibility rules; some limited exceptions apply. Players may hold more than one non-FIFA nationality.

No.	Pos.	Nation	Player

=== Persikabo 1973 ===
Head coach: Djadjang Nurdjaman

In: Note: Flags indicate national team as defined under FIFA eligibility rules; some limited exceptions apply. Players may hold more than one non-FIFA nationality.

No.	Pos.	Nation	Player

Out: Note: Flags indicate national team as defined under FIFA eligibility rules; some limited exceptions apply. Players may hold more than one non-FIFA nationality.

No.	Pos.	Nation	Player
—	GK	IDN	Diky Indriyana (to Semen Padang)
—	GK	IDN	Husna Al Malik (to Persik)
—	DF	IDN	Didik Wahyu (to Persik)
—	DF	IDN	Syahrul Lasinari (to PSM)
—	MF	IDN	Iman Fathuroman (to PSPS)
—	MF	IDN	Manahati Lestusen (to Malut United)
—	MF	BRA	Pedrinho (to PSIM)
—	FW	IDN	Yandi Sofyan (to Malut United)

=== Persikas ===
Head coach: Mial Balebata Armand

In: Note: Flags indicate national team as defined under FIFA eligibility rules; some limited exceptions apply. Players may hold more than one non-FIFA nationality.

No.	Pos.	Nation	Player
—	GK	IDN	Fery Bagus (from Deltras)
—	DF	IDN	Hamdan Zamzani (from Persiba Balikpapan)
—	MF	IDN	Jordan Zamorano (from Sada Sumut)
—	MF	IDN	Junda Irawan (from Nusantara United)
—	FW	IDN	Muhammad Isa (from Nusantara United)
—	FW	UKR	Yevhen Bokhashvili (from Sriwijaya)

Out: Note: Flags indicate national team as defined under FIFA eligibility rules; some limited exceptions apply. Players may hold more than one non-FIFA nationality.

No.	Pos.	Nation	Player

=== Persikota ===
Head coach: Delfi Adri

In: Note: Flags indicate national team as defined under FIFA eligibility rules; some limited exceptions apply. Players may hold more than one non-FIFA nationality.

No.	Pos.	Nation	Player
—	MF	KOR	Kim Do-hyun (from Persela)

Out: Note: Flags indicate national team as defined under FIFA eligibility rules; some limited exceptions apply. Players may hold more than one non-FIFA nationality.

No.	Pos.	Nation	Player
—	GK	IDN	Diaz Priambodo (to Persekat)

=== Persiku ===
Head coach: Sudirman

In: Note: Flags indicate national team as defined under FIFA eligibility rules; some limited exceptions apply. Players may hold more than one non-FIFA nationality.

No.	Pos.	Nation	Player
—	DF	IDN	Jajang Mulyana (from Bali United)
—	MF	JPN	Renshi Yamaguchi (from Gresi United)

Out: Note: Flags indicate national team as defined under FIFA eligibility rules; some limited exceptions apply. Players may hold more than one non-FIFA nationality.

No.	Pos.	Nation	Player

=== Persipa ===
Head coach: Bambang Nurdiansyah

In: Note: Flags indicate national team as defined under FIFA eligibility rules; some limited exceptions apply. Players may hold more than one non-FIFA nationality.

No.	Pos.	Nation	Player

Out: Note: Flags indicate national team as defined under FIFA eligibility rules; some limited exceptions apply. Players may hold more than one non-FIFA nationality.

No.	Pos.	Nation	Player

=== Persipal ===
Head coach: Achmad Zulkifli

In: Note: Flags indicate national team as defined under FIFA eligibility rules; some limited exceptions apply. Players may hold more than one non-FIFA nationality.

No.	Pos.	Nation	Player

Out: Note: Flags indicate national team as defined under FIFA eligibility rules; some limited exceptions apply. Players may hold more than one non-FIFA nationality.

No.	Pos.	Nation	Player

=== Persiraja ===
Head coach: Tony Ho

In: Note: Flags indicate national team as defined under FIFA eligibility rules; some limited exceptions apply. Players may hold more than one non-FIFA nationality.

No.	Pos.	Nation	Player

Out: Note: Flags indicate national team as defined under FIFA eligibility rules; some limited exceptions apply. Players may hold more than one non-FIFA nationality.

No.	Pos.	Nation	Player
—	GK	IDN	Muhammad Fahri (to Malut United)
—	FW	IDN	Ramadhan Madon (to Semen Padang)

=== PSIM ===
Head coach: Seto Nurdiantoro

In: Note: Flags indicate national team as defined under FIFA eligibility rules; some limited exceptions apply. Players may hold more than one non-FIFA nationality.

No.	Pos.	Nation	Player
24	MF	IDN	Arya Gerryan (from Borneo Samarinda)
—	GK	IDN	Riki Pambudi (from Persiba Balikpapan)
—	DF	IDN	Asyraq Gufron (from Arema)
—	DF	IDN	Rendra Teddy (from Arema)
—	DF	IDN	Rio Hardiawan (from Bekasi City)
—	DF	IDN	Samuel Simanjuntak (from Persis)
—	DF	IDN	Sunni Hizbullah (from Bekasi City)
—	MF	BRA	Pedrinho (from Persikabo 1973)
—	MF	IDN	Roken Tampubolon (from Semen Padang)
—	FW	IDN	Irvan Mofu (from Persipal)
—	FW	IDN	Saldi Amiruddin (from Bekasi City)

Out: Note: Flags indicate national team as defined under FIFA eligibility rules; some limited exceptions apply. Players may hold more than one non-FIFA nationality.

No.	Pos.	Nation	Player
—	FW	IDN	Ari Maring (to Borneo Samarinda)

=== PSKC ===
Head coach:Kas Hartadi

In: Note: Flags indicate national team as defined under FIFA eligibility rules; some limited exceptions apply. Players may hold more than one non-FIFA nationality.

No.	Pos.	Nation	Player

Out: Note: Flags indicate national team as defined under FIFA eligibility rules; some limited exceptions apply. Players may hold more than one non-FIFA nationality.

No.	Pos.	Nation	Player

=== PSMS ===
Head coach: Nil Maizar

In: Note: Flags indicate national team as defined under FIFA eligibility rules; some limited exceptions apply. Players may hold more than one non-FIFA nationality.

No.	Pos.	Nation	Player

Out: Note: Flags indicate national team as defined under FIFA eligibility rules; some limited exceptions apply. Players may hold more than one non-FIFA nationality.

No.	Pos.	Nation	Player
—	DF	IDN	Fardan Harahap (to PSPS)

=== PSPS ===
Head coach: Aji Santoso

In: Note: Flags indicate national team as defined under FIFA eligibility rules; some limited exceptions apply. Players may hold more than one non-FIFA nationality.

No.	Pos.	Nation	Player
—	DF	IDN	Fardan Harahap (from PSMS)
—	DF	IDN	Ahmad Birrul Walidain (from Gresik United)
—	DF	IDN	Maman Abdurahman (from Persija)
—	MF	IDN	Arsan Makarin (from Persib)
—	MF	IDN	Iman Fathuroman (from Persikabo 1973)

Out: Note: Flags indicate national team as defined under FIFA eligibility rules; some limited exceptions apply. Players may hold more than one non-FIFA nationality.

No.	Pos.	Nation	Player
—	DF	IDN	Supardi Nasir (to Nusantara United)

=== RANS Nusantara ===
Head coach: Vacant

In: Note: Flags indicate national team as defined under FIFA eligibility rules; some limited exceptions apply. Players may hold more than one non-FIFA nationality.

No.	Pos.	Nation	Player

Out: Note: Flags indicate national team as defined under FIFA eligibility rules; some limited exceptions apply. Players may hold more than one non-FIFA nationality.

No.	Pos.	Nation	Player
—	GK	IDN	Hilmansyah (to PSM)
—	MF	JPN	Mitsuru Maruoka (to Bali United)
—	MF	IDN	Paulo Sitanggang (to PSS)

=== Sriwijaya ===
Head coach: Jafri Sastra

In: Note: Flags indicate national team as defined under FIFA eligibility rules; some limited exceptions apply. Players may hold more than one non-FIFA nationality.

No.	Pos.	Nation	Player

Out: Note: Flags indicate national team as defined under FIFA eligibility rules; some limited exceptions apply. Players may hold more than one non-FIFA nationality.

No.	Pos.	Nation	Player
