= Dwi Rafi Angga =

Indonesian footballer (born 1996)

Personal information
- Full name: Muhammad Dwi Rafi Angga
- Date of birth: 19 October 1996 (age 30)
- Place of birth: Medan, Indonesia
- Height: 1.81 m (5 ft 11 in)
- Position: Striker

Team information
- Current team: Barito Putera
- Number: 9

Youth career
- 2015–2016: PSMS Medan

Senior career*
Years	Team	Apps	(Gls)
2017	PSGL Gayo Lues	5	(2)
2018	Bogor	9	(10)
2019–2020	PSIM Yogyakarta	10	(2)
2021	PSS Sleman	3	(0)
2021	→ Dewa United (loan)	9	(1)
2022	Bekasi City	6	(1)
2023–2024	Persela Lamongan	10	(1)
2024–2025	PSMS Medan	10	(3)
2025–2026	Adhyaksa Banten	10	(2)
2026–	Barito Putera	0	(0)
- * Club domestic league appearances and goals as of 2 May 2026 (UTC)

Muhammad Dwi Rafi Angga (born 19 October 1996) is an Indonesian professional footballer who plays as a striker for Championship club Barito Putera.

== Club career ==
=== PSS Sleman ===
He was signed for PSS Sleman to play in Liga 1 in the 2021 season. Rafi Angga made his debut on 5 September 2021 in a match against Persija Jakarta at the Pakansari Stadium, Cibinong.

==== Dewa United (loan) ====
In 2021, Angga signed a contract with Indonesian Liga 2 club Dewa United, on loan from PSS Sleman. He made his league debut on 5 October against Perserang Serang at the Gelora Bung Karno Madya Stadium, Jakarta. On 23 December 2021, Angga scored his first goal for Dewa United against PSMS Medan in the 87th minute at the Pakansari Stadium, Cibinong.

== Career statistics ==
=== Club ===
As of 2 May 2026

Club	Season	League			Cup		Continental		Other		Total	
Club	Season	Division	Apps	Goals	Apps	Goals	Apps	Goals	Apps	Goals	Apps	Goals
PSGL Gayo Lues	2017	Liga 3	5	2	0	0	–		0	0	5	2
Bogor	2018	Liga 3	9	10	0	0	–		0	0	9	10
PSIM Yogyakarta	2019	Liga 2	10	2	0	0	–		0	0	10	2
PSIM Yogyakarta	2020	Liga 2	0	0	0	0	–		0	0	0	0
PSS Sleman	2021	Liga 1	3	0	0	0	–		3 (Note: Appearances in Menpora Cup.)	0	6	0
Dewa United (loan)	2021	Liga 2	9	1	0	0	–		0	0	9	1
Bekasi City	2022–23	Liga 2	6	1	0	0	–		0	0	6	1
Persela Lamongan	2023–24	Liga 2	10	1	0	0	–		0	0	10	1
PSMS Medan	2024–25	Liga 2	10	3	0	0	–		0	0	10	3
Adhyaksa Banten	2025–26	Championship	10	2	0	0	–		0	0	10	2
Career total			72	22	0	0	0	0	3	0	75	22

== Honours ==
=== Club ===
PSS Sleman

- Menpora Cup third place: 2021

Dewa United

- Liga 2 third place (play-offs): 2021
