= Nurhidayat =

Indonesian footballer (born 1999)

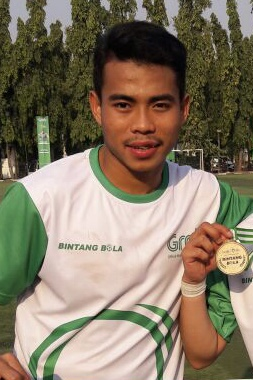
- Nurhidayat in 2018

Personal information
- Full name: Nurhidayat Haji Haris
- Date of birth: 5 April 1999 (age 27)
- Place of birth: Makassar, Indonesia
- Height: 1.73 m (5 ft 8 in)
- Position: Defender

Team information
- Current team: Persiku Kudus
- Number: 5

Youth career
- 2015–2016: PON Sulsel
- 2016: Bhayangkara

Senior career*
Years	Team	Apps	(Gls)
2017	PSM Makassar	2	(0)
2018–2021	Bhayangkara	29	(0)
2021	PSM Makassar	0	(0)
2021	PSG Pati	5	(0)
2021–2022	PSIM Yogyakarta	2	(0)
2022–2023	Bhayangkara	7	(0)
2023–2024	Persiraja Banda Aceh	10	(0)
2024	United City	14	(2)
2024–2025	Persibo Bojonegoro	18	(0)
2025–2026	PSBS Biak	27	(0)
2026–	Persiku Kudus	1	(1)

International career
2017–2018	Indonesia U19	18	(0)
2019	Indonesia U23	14	(0)
2021	Indonesia	2	(0)
Medal record
Men's football
Representing Indonesia
AFF U-19 Youth Championship
Third place	2017 Myanmar
Third place	2018 Indonesia	Team
AFF U-22 Youth Championship
Winner	2019 Cambodia	Team
Southeast Asian Games
Silver medal – second place	2019 Philippines	Team
- * Club domestic league appearances and goals as of 12 September 2026

Nurhidayat Haji Haris (born 5 April 1999) is an Indonesian professional footballer who plays as a defender for Championship club Persiku Kudus.

== Club career ==
=== PSM Makassar ===
Nurhidayat in 2017 started his professional career at his hometown club PSM Makassar and played in the 2017 Liga 1 competition. At the end of the season, he moved to the 2017 Liga 1 champion Bhayangkara. He returned to PSM in early 2021.

=== Bhayangkara ===
In 2018, Nurhidayat signed a two-season contract with Liga 1 club Bhayangkara. Nurhidayat debuted for this police-supported team on 23 March 2018 in the first match of the 2018 Liga 1 season. He was a regular for the club in the two seasons he was there, appearing in 29 matches.

=== Return to PSM Makassar ===
In early 2021, Nurhidayat returned to hometown club PSM Makassar. on his second spell with the club, he didn't make a single appearance. subsequently he moved to Liga 2 side PSG Pati.

=== PSG Pati ===
In June 2021, Nurhidayat signed a contract with Indonesian Liga 2 club PSG Pati. He made his league debut on 4 October against PSCS Cilacap at the Manahan Stadium, Surakarta. Nurhidayat played five times for PSG Pati in 2021 Liga 2 without scoring a goal.

=== PSIM Yogyakarta ===
Nurhidayat was signed for PSIM Yogyakarta to play in the second round of Liga 2 in the 2021 season. He made his debut on 27 December 2021 in a 3–0 loss against RANS Cilegon as a substitute for Sunni Hizbullah in the 73rd minute at the Pakansari Stadium, Cibinong. Nurhidayat played two times for PSIM in 2021 Liga 2 without scoring a goal.

=== United City ===
On 24 March 2024, Nurhidayat signed with Philippines club, United City. Nurhidayat made his debut for the club on 8 April 2024 against Kaya –Iloilo.

== International career ==
=== Youth ===
On 31 May 2017, Nurhidayat debuted for the Indonesia U19 in a match against the Brazil U20 team in the 2017 Toulon Tournament in France. Nurhidayat captained the Indonesia U19 team in the 2018 AFC U-19 Championship.

Nurhidayat was part of the Indonesia U23 squad that won silver in the 2019 Southeast Asian Games in the Philippines.

=== Senior ===
Nurhidayat received his first call to join the senior Indonesia national team in May 2021. He earned his first senior cap on 25 May 2021 in a friendly match against Afghanistan in Dubai.

== Career statistics ==
=== Club ===
As of 12 September 2026

Club	Season	League			Cup		Continental		Other		Total	
Club	Season	Division	Apps	Goals	Apps	Goals	Apps	Goals	Apps	Goals	Apps	Goals
PSM Makassar	2017	Liga 1	2	0	0	0	–		0	0	2	0
Bhayangkara	2018	Liga 1	14	0	0	0	–		0	0	14	0
Bhayangkara	2019	Liga 1	15	0	0	0	–		0	0	15	0
Bhayangkara	2020	Liga 1	0	0	0	0	–		0	0	0	0
Bhayangkara	Total		29	0	0	0	–		0	0	29	0
PSG Pati	2021–22	Liga 2	5	0	0	0	–		0	0	5	0
PSIM Yogyakarta	2021–22	Liga 2	2	0	0	0	–		0	0	2	0
Bhayangkara	2022–23	Liga 1	7	0	0	0	–		0	0	7	0
Persiraja Banda Aceh	2023–24	Liga 2	10	0	0	0	–		0	0	10	0
United City	2024	Philippines Football League	14	2	0	0	–		0	0	14	2
Persibo Bojonegoro	2024–25	Liga 2	18	0	0	0	–		0	0	18	0
PSBS Biak	2025–26	Super League	27	0	0	0	–		0	0	27	0
Persiku Kudus	2026–27	Championship	1	1	0	0	–		0	0	1	1
Career total			115	3	0	0	0	0	0	0	115	3

=== International ===
As of match played 29 May 2021

Appearances and goals by national team and year
National team	Year	Apps	Goals
Indonesia	2021	2	0
Total		2	0

== Honours ==
=== International ===
Indonesia U-19

- AFF U-19 Youth Championship third place: 2017, 2018

Indonesia U-23

- AFF U-22 Youth Championship: 2019
- SEA Games silver medal: 2019
