= Aji Kurniawan =

Indonesian footballer

Personal information
- Full name: Muhammad Aji Kurniawan
- Date of birth: July 1, 2000 (age 26)
- Place of birth: Maros, Indonesia
- Height: 1.69 m (5 ft 7 in)
- Position: Winger

Youth career
- SSB Salewangan
- Medco U15
- PPLP Sulawesi Selatan
- 2017–2019: PSM Makassar

Senior career*
Years	Team	Apps	(Gls)
2019–2021	PSM Makassar	5	(1)
2021	→ Persijap Jepara (loan)	5	(0)
2022–2023	Persikabo 1973	8	(0)
2023–2024	Persela Lamongan	8	(0)
2024	Persibo Bojonegoro	0	(0)
2025	Persikota Tangerang	2	(0)
2026	Persiba Balikpapan	6	(0)
- * Club domestic league appearances and goals as of 3 May 2026

Muhammad Aji Kurniawan (born July 1, 2000) is an Indonesian professional footballer who plays as a winger.

== Club career ==
=== PSM Makassar ===
He was signed for PSM Makassar to play in Liga 1. Aji made his debut on 10 November 2019 in a match against Kalteng Putra. On 10 November 2019, Aji scored his first goal for PSM against Kalteng Putra in the 39th minute at the Tuah Pahoe Stadium, Palangkaraya.

==== Persijap Jepara (loan) ====
In 2021, Aji signed a contract with Indonesian Liga 2 club Persijap Jepara, on loan from PSM Makassar. He made his league debut on 27 September against Hizbul Wathan at the Manahan Stadium, Surakarta.

=== Persikabo 1973 ===
Aji was signed for Persikabo 1973 to play in Liga 1 in the 2022–23 season. He made his league debut on 25 July 2022 in a match against Persebaya Surabaya at the Pakansari Stadium, Cibinong.

== Career statistics ==
=== Club ===
As of 3 May 2026.

Club	Season	League			Cup		Continental		Other		Total	
Club	Season	Division	Apps	Goals	Apps	Goals	Apps	Goals	Apps	Goals	Apps	Goals
PSM Makassar	2019	Liga 1	5	1	0	0	–		0	0	5	1
PSM Makassar	2020	Liga 1	0	0	0	0	–		0	0	0	0
PSM Makassar	2021	Liga 1	0	0	0	0	–		5 (Note: Appearances in Menpora Cup.)	0	5	0
Persijap Jepara (loan)	2021	Liga 2	5	0	0	0	–		0	0	5	0
Persikabo 1973	2022–23	Liga 1	8	0	0	0	–		1 (Note: Appearances in Indonesia President's Cup)	0	9	0
Persela Lamongan	2023–24	Liga 2	8	0	0	0	–		0	0	8	0
Persibo Bojonegoro	2024–25	Liga 2	0	0	0	0	–		0	0	0	0
Persikota Tangerang	2024–25	Liga 2	2	0	0	0	–		0	0	2	0
Persiba Balikpapan	2025–26	Championship	6	0	0	0	–		0	0	6	0
Career total			34	1	0	0	0	0	6	0	40	1
