= Douglas Cruz =

Brazilian footballer

Personal information
- Full name: Douglas Nonato Oliveira Cruz
- Date of birth: 4 September 1998 (age 28)
- Place of birth: Valente, Bahia, Brazil
- Height: 1.90 m (6 ft 3 in)
- Position: Centre-back

Team information
- Current team: Isenmulang Kalteng
- Number: 74

Youth career
- –2019: Fluminense de Feira

Senior career*
Years	Team	Apps	(Gls)
2019–2020	Dubrava	14	(0)
2020–2021	Borac Banja Luka	10	(1)
2021	Rudar Prijedor	11	(1)
2021–2022	Nitra	21	(2)
2022–2023	Hrvatski Dragovoljac	12	(0)
2023	São Bernardo	17	(1)
2024	Hegelmann	5	(0)
2024–2025	PSPS Pekanbaru	19	(0)
2025	Persijap Jepara	5	(0)
2026	PSPS Pekanbaru	12	(4)
2026–	Isenmulang Kalteng	3	(1)
- * Club domestic league appearances and goals as of 19 September 2026

Douglas Nonato Oliveira Cruz (born 4 September 1998) is a Brazilian professional footballer who plays as a centre-back for Super League club Isenmulang Kalteng.

== Club career ==
Born in Valente, Bahia, Brazil, Douglas is a youth product from Fluminense de Feira. He decided to go abroad for the first time to Croatia with joined Dubrava. He made his club debut on 18 August 2019, starting in a 0–2 away lose against Croatia Zmijavci in the 2019–20 Croatian Second Football League. While playing for Borac Banja Luka, he contributed with 12 appearances and scoring one goal in all competitions. One goal he scored for Borac in a match against Velež Mostar in a 2–0 win on 4 October 2020.

=== Hegelmann ===
On 29 December 2023, Douglas signed a contract with Lithuanian A Lyga club Hegelmann. He made his league debut for Hegelmann in a 2–2 draw against Šiauliai on 13 March 2024. In July 2024, it was confirmed that Douglas had left the club, he contributed with 5 league appearances and one appearance in 2024 Lithuanian Football Cup.

=== PSPS Pekanbaru ===
On 28 July 2024, Douglas move to Asia and signed a contract with Indonesian Liga 2 club PSPS Pekanbaru. He made his league debut for PSPS Pekanbaru in a 3–1 win against Persikabo 1973 on 7 September 2024. On 15 November 2024, he captained his team for the first time, in a match against Bekasi City. On 1 December 2024, he was named player of the match when PSPS Pekanbaru won 1–0 against Persikota Tangerang.

=== Persijap Jepara ===
Newly promoted club from 2024–25 Liga 2, Persijap Jepara announced the signing of Douglas on 24 June 2025.
