= Didik =

Didik is a given name. Notable people with the name include:

- Didik Ariyanto (born 1991), Indonesian footballer
- Didik Nini Thowok (born 1954), Javanese dancer
- Didik Wahyu (born 1994), Indonesian footballer
