= Sugeng Efendi =

Indonesian footballer

Personal information
- Full name: Sugeng Efendi
- Date of birth: 31 August 1998 (age 28)
- Place of birth: Magelang, Indonesia
- Height: 1.67 m (5 ft 6 in)
- Position: Winger

Youth career
- Bali United
- Persela Lamongan

Senior career*
Years	Team	Apps	(Gls)
2018–2021	Persela Lamongan	58	(5)
2021	PSIM Yogyakarta	13	(5)
2022–2023	Dewa United	16	(1)
2023–2024	PSKC Cimahi	16	(0)
- * Club domestic league appearances and goals as of 13 September 2024

Sugeng Efendi (born 31 August 1998) is an Indonesian professional footballer who plays as a winger.

== Club career ==
=== Persela Lamongan ===
He was signed for Persela Lamongan to play in Liga 1 in the 2018 season. Sugeng made his first-team debut on 24 March 2018 in a match against Persipura Jayapura. Sugeng scored his first goal for Persela in the 60th minute against Persipura Jayapura.

=== PSIM Yogyakarta ===
In 2021, Sugeng signed a contract with Indonesian Liga 2 club PSIM Yogyakarta. He made his league debut on 26 September in a 1–0 loss against PSCS Cilacap. On 19 October 2021, Sugeng scored his first goal for PSIM in the 86th minute against PSG Pati.

=== Dewa United ===
Sugeng was signed for Dewa United to play in Liga 1 in the 2022–23 season. He made his league debut on 25 July 2022 in a match against Persis Solo at the Moch. Soebroto Stadium, Magelang.

== Career statistics ==
=== Club ===
As of 13 September 2024

Club	Season	League			Cup (Note: Includes Piala Indonesia)		Continental		Other (Note: Appearances in Indonesia President's Cup)		Total	
Club	Season	Division	Apps	Goals	Apps	Goals	Apps	Goals	Apps	Goals	Apps	Goals
Persela Lamongan	2018	Liga 1	27	1	2	1	–		0	0	29	2
Persela Lamongan	2019	Liga 1	31	4	2	0	–		1	0	34	4
Persela Lamongan	2020	Liga 1	0	0	0	0	–		0	0	0	0
Persela Lamongan	Total		58	5	4	1	–		1	0	63	6
PSIM Yogyakarta	2021	Liga 2	13	5	0	0	–		0	0	13	5
Dewa United	2022–23	Liga 1	16	1	0	0	–		1	0	17	1
PSKC Cimahi	2023–24	Liga 2	16	0	0	0	–		0	0	16	0
Career total			103	11	4	1	0	0	2	0	109	12
