= Ade Suhendra (footballer, born 1983) =

Indonesian footballer

Personal information
- Full name: Ade Suhendra
- Date of birth: 7 May 1983 (age 43)
- Place of birth: Bengkalis, Indonesia
- Height: 1.74 m (5 ft 9 in)
- Position: Midfielder

Team information
- Current team: Isenmulang Kalteng (assistant coach)

Senior career*
Years	Team	Apps	(Gls)
2008–2009	Persija Jakarta	16	(1)
2009–2010	PSPS Pekanbaru	30	(0)
2010–2011	Sriwijaya	8	(0)
2011–2013	PSPS Pekanbaru	42	(1)
2014	Persepam Madura Utama	13	(1)
2015	Perserang Serang	6	(0)
2015	Persegres Gresik	4	(1)
2016	Persita Tangerang	13	(0)
2017	Persikad Depok	14	(0)
2017	Kalteng Putra	7	(0)
2018	Persika Karawang	10	(1)
2018	Persik Kendal	12	(2)
2019	PSIM Yogyakarta	12	(0)
2020	Cilegon United	0	(0)
2021	Dewa United	2	(1)
Total		189	(8)

International career
2008	Indonesia	1	(0)

Managerial career
- 2019–2020: PSIM Yogyakarta (assistant)
- 2022–2023: Bekasi City (assistant)
- 2023–2026: Adhyaksa
- 2026–: Isenmulang Kalteng (assistant)
- * Club domestic league appearances and goals

Ade Suhendra (born 7 May 1983) is an Indonesian former professional footballer who played as a midfielder. He is currently the assistant coach of Indonesia Super League club Isenmulang Kalteng.

== Managerial statistics ==
As of 31 August 2026

Managerial record by team and tenure
Team	Nat.	From	To	Record								Ref.
Team	Nat.	From	To	G	W	D	L	GF	GA	GD	Win %	Ref.
Adhyaksa	(Indonesia)	1 September 2023	31 August 2026	64	34	20	10	126	67	+59	53.13	
Career Total				64	34	20	10	126	67	+59	53.13	

== Honours ==
=== Club ===
Sriwijaya

- Indonesian Community Shield: 2010
- Indonesian Inter Island Cup: 2010

Dewa United

- Liga 2 third place (play-offs): 2021

=== Individual ===
- Championship Best Coach: 2025–26
