= Chris Rumbiak =

Indonesian footballer (born 2001)

Personal information
- Full name: Chris Robert Rumbiak
- Date of birth: June 24, 2001 (age 25)
- Place of birth: Biak, Indonesia
- Height: 1.63 m (5 ft 4 in)
- Position: Right winger

Team information
- Current team: Sriwijaya
- Number: 18

Youth career
- PPLP Papua

Senior career*
Years	Team	Apps	(Gls)
2021–2024	Barito Putera	17	(0)
2022	→ Perserang Serang (loan)	7	(0)
2023–2024	→ PSPS Riau (loan)	3	(0)
2024–	Sriwijaya	16	(2)
- * Club domestic league appearances and goals as of 15 February 2025

Chris Robert Rumbiak (born June 24, 2001) is an Indonesian professional footballer who plays as a right winger for Liga 2 club Sriwijaya.

== Club career ==
=== Barito Putera ===
He was signed for Barito Putera to play in Liga 1 in the 2021 season. Rumbiak made his professional debut on 11 September 2021 in a match against Bali United at the Indomilk Arena, Tangerang.

==== Loan to Perserang Serang ====
On 2022, Rumbiak signed with Liga 2 club Perserang Serang, on loan from Liga 1 club Barito Putera. He made 7 league appearances for Perserang in the 2022-23 Liga 2 (Indonesia).

== Career statistics ==
=== Club ===
As of 15 February 2025

Club	Season	League			Cup		Continental		Other		Total	
Club	Season	Division	Apps	Goals	Apps	Goals	Apps	Goals	Apps	Goals	Apps	Goals
Barito Putera	2021	Liga 1	6	0	0	0	–		4 (Note: Appearances in Menpora Cup)	0	10	0
Barito Putera	2022–23	Liga 1	5	0	0	0	–		0	0	5	0
Barito Putera	2023–24	Liga 1	6	0	0	0	–		0	0	6	0
Perserang Serang (loan)	2022–23	Liga 2	7	0	0	0	–		0	0	7	0
PSPS Riau (loan)	2023–24	Liga 2	3	0	0	0	–		0	0	3	0
Sriwijaya	2024–25	Liga 2	16	2	0	0	–		0	0	16	2
Career total			43	2	0	0	0	0	4	0	47	2
