= Husna Al Malik =

Indonesian association footballer

Personal information
- Full name: Husna Al Malik Riwani Saputra
- Date of birth: 13 June 2003 (age 23)
- Place of birth: Pati, Indonesia
- Height: 1.78 m (5 ft 10 in)
- Position: Goalkeeper

Team information
- Current team: Persik Kediri
- Number: 33

Youth career
- 2020: PSG Pati

Senior career*
Years	Team	Apps	(Gls)
2021–2022	PSG Pati	0	(0)
2022–2024	Persikabo 1973	16	(0)
2024–	Persik Kediri	19	(0)
- * Club domestic league appearances and goals as of 31 October 2026

Husna Al Malik Riwani Saputra (born 13 June 2003) is an Indonesian professional footballer who plays as a goalkeeper for Super League club Persik Kediri.

== Club career ==
Husna started his career by joining Liga 2 club PSG Pati to play in Liga 2.

=== Persikabo 1973 ===
Ahead of the 2022–23 Liga 1 season, Husna signed a contract with Liga 1 club Persikabo 1973. Husna made his Liga 1 debut on 22 July 2023 as a starter in a 1–3 away win over Bhayangkara. Husna was selected for the Best XI of the Week of 2023–24 Liga 1. He impressed in the match week 6 against Persebaya Surabaya at Gelora Bung Tomo Stadium, Surabaya on 4 August 2023.

== Career statistics ==
=== Club ===
As of 31 October 2026.

Club	Season	League			Cup		Continental		Other		Total	
Club	Season	Division	Apps	Goals	Apps	Goals	Apps	Goals	Apps	Goals	Apps	Goals
PSG Pati	2021–22	Liga 2	0	0	0	0	–		0	0	0	0
Persikabo 1973	2022–23	Liga 1	0	0	0	0	–		0	0	0	0
Persikabo 1973	2023–24	Liga 1	16	0	0	0	–		0	0	16	0
Persikabo 1973	Total		16	0	0	0	0	0	0	0	16	0
Persik Kediri	2024–25	Liga 1	6	0	0	0	–		0	0	6	0
Persik Kediri	2025–26	Super League	6	0	0	0	–		0	0	6	0
Persik Kediri	2026–27	Super League	7	0	0	0	–		0	0	7	0
Career total			35	0	0	0	0	0	0	0	35	0

== Honours ==
Individual

- Liga 1 Young Player of the Month: September 2023, January 2025
