= Gutawa =

Gutawa is a surname. Notable people with the surname include:

- Erwin Gutawa (born 1962), Indonesian composer and songwriter
- Erwin Gutawa (footballer) (born 1992), Indonesian footballer
- Gita Gutawa (born 1993), Indonesian singer, actress, and songwriter, daughter of Erwin
