= Arya Gerryan =

Indonesian footballer

Personal information
- Full name: Arya Putra Gerryan Senyiur Lawolo
- Date of birth: 24 October 2001 (age 25)
- Place of birth: Samarinda, Indonesia
- Height: 1.64 m (5 ft 5 in)
- Position: Winger

Team information
- Current team: Persela Lamongan
- Number: 24

Youth career
- 2018–2019: Borneo

Senior career*
| Years | Team | Apps | (Gls) |
| 2020–2024 | Borneo Samarinda | 9 | (0) |
| 2021 | → Persijap Jepara (loan) | 3 | (0) |
| 2022 | → Persiraja Banda Aceh (loan) | 14 | (0) |
| 2023–2024 | → PSIM Yogyakarta (loan) | 9 | (0) |
| 2024–2025 | PSIM Yogyakarta | 17 | (1) |
| 2025– | Persela Lamongan | 12 | (0) |
- * Club domestic league appearances and goals as of 23:40, 3 May 2026 (UTC)

Arya Putra Gerryan Senyiur Lawolo (born 24 October 2001) is an Indonesian professional footballer who plays as a winger for Liga 2 club Persela Lamongan.

== Club career ==
=== Borneo ===
Arya signed with Borneo to play in the Indonesian Liga 1 for the 2020 season. This season was suspended on 27 March 2020 due to the COVID-19 pandemic. The season was abandoned and was declared void on 20 January 2021.

==== Persijap Jepara (loan) ====
In 2021, Arya signed a contract with Indonesian Liga 2 club Persijap Jepara. He made his league debut on 16 November 2021 in a match against PSG Pati at the Manahan Stadium, Surakarta.

==== Persiraja Banda Aceh (loan) ====
In 2021, Arya signed a contract with Indonesian Liga 1 club Persiraja Banda Aceh, on loan from Borneo. He made his league debut on 16 January 2022 in a match against Persipura Jayapura at the Kompyang Sujana Stadium, Denpasar.

== Career statistics ==
=== Club ===
As of 3 May 2026.

| Club | Season | League | | | Cup | | Continental | | Other | | Total | |
| Club | Season | Division | Apps | Goals | Apps | Goals | Apps | Goals | Apps | Goals | Apps | Goals |
|---|---|---|---|---|---|---|---|---|---|---|---|---|
| Borneo Samarinda | 2020 | Liga 1 | 0 | 0 | 0 | 0 | – | | 0 | 0 | 0 | 0 |
| Borneo Samarinda | 2021–22 | Liga 1 | 0 | 0 | 0 | 0 | – | | 0 | 0 | 0 | 0 |
| Borneo Samarinda | 2022–23 | Liga 1 | 8 | 0 | 0 | 0 | – | | 5 (Note: Appearances in Indonesia President's Cup) | 0 | 13 | 0 |
| Borneo Samarinda | 2023–24 | Liga 1 | 1 | 0 | 0 | 0 | – | | 0 | 0 | 1 | 0 |
| Persijap Jepara (loan) | 2021 | Liga 2 | 3 | 0 | 0 | 0 | – | | 0 | 0 | 3 | 0 |
| Persiraja Banda Aceh (loan) | 2021 | Liga 1 | 14 | 0 | 0 | 0 | – | | 0 | 0 | 14 | 0 |
| PSIM Yogyakarta (loan) | 2023–24 | Liga 2 | 9 | 0 | 0 | 0 | – | | 0 | 0 | 9 | 0 |
| PSIM Yogyakarta | 2024–25 | Liga 2 | 17 | 1 | 0 | 0 | – | | 0 | 0 | 17 | 1 |
| Persela Lamongan | 2025–26 | Championship | 12 | 0 | 0 | 0 | – | | 0 | 0 | 12 | 0 |
| Career total | | | 64 | 1 | 0 | 0 | 0 | 0 | 5 | 0 | 69 | 1 |

== Honours ==
Borneo Samarinda

- Piala Presiden runner-up: 2022

PSIM Yogyakarta

- Liga 2: 2024–25
