= Brayen Pondaag =

Indonesian footballer (born 2001)

Personal information
- Full name: Brayen Pondaag
- Date of birth: 17 December 2001 (age 24)
- Place of birth: Bitung, Indonesia
- Height: 1.75 m (5 ft 9 in)
- Position: Attacking midfielder

Team information
- Current team: Isenmulang Kalteng
- Number: 30

Youth career
- 2012–2013: SSB Sparta
- 2015–2016: Bina Taruna
- 2016–2019: Persbit Bitung
- 2021: PON Sulawesi Utara

Senior career*
Years	Team	Apps	(Gls)
2021	Persmin Minahasa	12	(2)
2022–2024	Persebaya Surabaya	7	(0)
2023	→ Persikab Bandung (loan)	1	(0)
2023–2024	→ Persipal Palu (loan)	3	(0)
2024–2025	Persibo Bojonegoro	21	(0)
2025–	Isenmulang Kalteng	29	(0)
- * Club domestic league appearances and goals as of 19 September 2026

Brayen Pondaag (born 17 December 2001) is an Indonesian professional footballer who plays as an attacking midfielder for Championship club Isenmulang Kalteng.

== Club career ==
=== Persmin Minahasa ===
On 2021, Pondaag signed a one-year contract with Liga 3 club Persmin Minahasa. He made 12 league appearances and scored 2 goals for Persmin Minahasa in the 2021 Liga 3 (Indonesia).

=== Persebaya Surabaya ===
He was signed for Persebaya Surabaya and played in Liga 1 in 2022–2023 season. Pondaag made his league debut on 23 August 2022 in a match against PSIS Semarang at the Gelora Bung Tomo Stadium, Surabaya.

== Career statistics ==
=== Club ===
As of 19 September 2026

Club	Season	League			Cup		Other		Total	
Club	Season	Division	Apps	Goals	Apps	Goals	Apps	Goals	Apps	Goals
Persmin Minahasa	2021	Liga 3	12	2	0	0	0	0	12	2
Persebaya Surabaya	2022–23	Liga 1	7	0	0	0	0	0	7	0
Persebaya Surabaya	2023–24	Liga 1	0	0	0	0	0	0	0	0
Persikab Bandung (loan)	2023–24	Liga 2	1	0	0	0	0	0	1	0
Persipal Palu (loan)	2023–24	Liga 2	3	0	0	0	0	0	3	0
Persibo Bojonegoro	2024–25	Liga 2	21	0	0	0	0	0	21	0
Isenmulang Kalteng	2025–26	Championship	26	0	0	0	0	0	26	0
Isenmulang Kalteng	2026–27	Super League	3	0	0	0	0	0	3	0
Career total			73	2	0	0	0	0	73	2

== Honours ==
=== Club ===
Persmin Minahasa

- Liga 3 North Sulawesi: 2021
