= Imam Mahmudi =

Indonesian footballer

Personal information
- Full name: Imam Mahmudi
- Date of birth: 9 April 1994 (age 32)
- Place of birth: Kediri, Indonesia
- Height: 1.76 m (5 ft 9 in)
- Position: Defender

Team information
- Current team: Perserang Serang
- Number: 49

Youth career
- 2015–2016: PON Jatim

Senior career*
Years	Team	Apps	(Gls)
2016	Sragen United	7	(0)
2017–2018	Madura	37	(1)
2019–2021	Persiba Balikpapan	32	(0)
2022	PSS Sleman	6	(0)
2022	PSMS Medan	2	(0)
2023–2024	Sulut United	18	(0)
2024–2025	Persekat Tegal	14	(0)
2025–	Perserang Serang	8	(0)
- * Club domestic league appearances and goals as of 30 December 2025

Imam Mahmudi (born 9 April 1994) is an Indonesian professional footballer who plays as a defender for Liga Nusantara club Perserang Serang.

== Club career ==
=== PSS Sleman ===
He was signed for PSS Sleman to play in Liga 1 in the 2021 season. Mahmudi made his league debut on 2 January 2022 in a match against Persik Kediri at the Kapten I Wayan Dipta Stadium, Gianyar.

=== PSMS Medan ===
Mahmudi was signed for PSMS Medan to play in Liga 2 in the 2022–23 season. He made his league debut on 22 September 2022 in a match against PSPS Riau at the Riau Main Stadium, Riau.

== Career statistics ==
=== Club ===
As of 30 December 2025

Club	Season	League			Domestic Cup		Other		Total	
Club	Season	Division	Apps	Goals	Apps	Goals	Apps	Goals	Apps	Goals
Sragen United	2016	ISC B	7	0	0	0	0	0	7	0
Madura	2017	Liga 2	16	0	0	0	0	0	16	0
Madura	2018	Liga 2	21	1	0	0	0	0	21	1
Madura	Total		37	1	0	0	0	0	37	1
Persiba Balikpapan	2019	Liga 2	19	0	0	0	0	0	19	0
Persiba Balikpapan	2020	Liga 2	1	0	0	0	0	0	1	0
Persiba Balikpapan	2021	Liga 2	12	0	0	0	0	0	12	0
Persiba Balikpapan	Total		32	0	0	0	0	0	32	0
PSS Sleman	2021	Liga 1	6	0	0	0	0	0	6	0
PSMS Medan	2022–23	Liga 2	2	0	0	0	0	0	2	0
Sulut United	2023–24	Liga 2	18	0	0	0	0	0	18	0
Persekat Tegal	2024–25	Liga 2	14	0	0	0	0	0	14	0
Perserang Serang	2025–26	Liga Nusantara	8	0	0	0	0	0	8	0
Career total			124	1	0	0	0	0	124	1
