= Frendi Saputra =

Indonesian association football player

Personal information
- Full name: Frendi Saputra
- Date of birth: 27 January 1992 (age 34)
- Place of birth: Bandar Lampung, Indonesia
- Height: 1.73 m (5 ft 8 in)
- Position: Left-back

Youth career
- 2012–2013: Lampung FC

Senior career*
Years	Team	Apps	(Gls)
2014–2015	PS Bengkulu	10	(0)
2016–2017	Perserang Serang	15	(1)
2018–2022	PSIS Semarang	78	(0)
2023	Dewa United	9	(0)
2023–2024	Barito Putera	28	(1)
2024–2025	Semen Padang	15	(0)
2025–2026	Barito Putera	18	(0)
- * Club domestic league appearances and goals as of 25 April 2026

Frendi Saputra (born 27 January 1992) is an Indonesian professional footballer who plays as a left-back.

== Club career ==
=== PSIS Semarang ===
He was signed for PSIS Semarang to play in Liga 1 in the 2018 season. Frendi made his debut on 25 March 2018 in a match against PSM Makassar at the Andi Mattalatta Stadium, Makassar.

=== Dewa United ===
On 29 January 2023, Frendi signed a contract with Liga 1 club Dewa United from PSIS Semarang. Frendi made his league debut for the club in a 1–1 draw against Madura United.
