= Ardi Ramdani =

Indonesian footballer

Personal information
- Full name: Ardi Ramdani
- Date of birth: 28 December 1997 (age 28)
- Place of birth: Garut, Indonesia
- Height: 1.78 m (5 ft 10 in)
- Position: Centre-back

Team information
- Current team: Isenmulang Kalteng
- Number: 18

Youth career
- 2017: Porda Kabupaten Garut

Senior career*
Years	Team	Apps	(Gls)
2018	Persikota Tangerang		
2018–2020	PSGC Ciamis	5	(1)
2020–	Isenmulang Kalteng	56	(1)
- * Club domestic league appearances and goals as of 7 November 2026

Ardi Ramdani (born 28 December 1997) is an Indonesian professional footballer who plays as a centre-back for Super League club Isenmulang Kalteng, which he captains.

== Career ==
Born in Garut, Indonesia, Ramdani played for the youth sides of Porda Kabupaten Garut, making his first team debut in 2017. In the following year, he moved to Liga 3 club Persikota Tangerang. Subsequently, he signed a contract with another Liga 3 club PSGC Ciamis before representing Farmel (now Isenmulang Kalteng) in 2020.

He became captain of Isenmulang Kalteng during the 2026–27 season.

== Honours ==
Adhyaksa Farmel (Isenmulang Kalteng)

- Liga 3: 2023–24
