= Adriel Fernández =

Bolivian footballer

Personal information
- Full name: Adriel Fernández Sánchez
- Date of birth: 22 March 1996 (age 30)
- Place of birth: La Paz, Bolivia
- Height: 1.77 m (5 ft 10 in)
- Position: Left winger • midfielder

Team information
- Current team: Isenmulang Kalteng
- Number: 23

Youth career
- 2012–2015: Boca Juniors
- 2016: Bolívar

Senior career*
| Years | Team | Apps | (Gls) |
| 2018 | Universitario de Sucre | 17 | (1) |
| 2019–2020 | Aurora | 20 | (2) |
| 2021–2023 | Jorge Wilstermann | 55 | (4) |
| 2023 | GV San José | 23 | (3) |
| 2024 | The Strongest | 2 | (0) |
| 2024 | San Antonio Bulo Bulo | 27 | (1) |
| 2025 | Aurora | 16 | (2) |
| 2025–2026 | Real Oruro | 6 | (2) |
| 2026– | Isenmulang Kalteng | 3 | (0) |
- * Club domestic league appearances and goals as of 19 September 2026

Adriel Fernández Sánchez (born 22 March 1996) is a Bolivian professional footballer who plays as a left winger or midfielder for Super League club Isenmulang Kalteng.

== Club career ==
=== Argentina ===
Fernández developed through the youth academy of Argentine giants Boca Juniors until late 2015.

=== Bolivia ===
In 2016, he returned to Bolivia to join the youth team of Club Bolívar, representing the team in the 2016 U-20 Copa Libertadores. He made his professional senior debut with Universitario de Sucre on 26 February 2018 against Oriente Petrolero.

Fernández spent several seasons playing in the Bolivian Primera División, registering stints with prominent clubs including Aurora, Jorge Wilstermann, GV San José, The Strongest, and San Antonio Bulo Bulo, the latter with whom he featured in the Copa Libertadores. Prior to moving abroad, he played for Real Oruro, scoring two goals in six appearances.

=== Isenmulang Kalteng ===
In August 2026, Fernández moved to Southeast Asia, officially signing with newly promoted Indonesian club Isenmulang Kalteng for the 2026–27 Super League campaign. He made his unofficial debut for the club on 16 August 2026 during a pre-season friendly match against Barito Putera. He made his league debut for Isenmulang Kalteng on 4 September 2026, playing as a substituted in a 4–0 away lose over Arema at the Kanjuruhan Stadium.
