= Slamet Budiyono =

Indonesian association football player

Personal information
- Full name: Slamet Budiyono
- Date of birth: 15 May 1995 (age 31)
- Place of birth: Bangun Jaya, Musi Rawas, Indonesia
- Height: 1.77 m (5 ft 10 in)
- Position: Winger

Team information
- Current team: Persibo Bojonegoro
- Number: 41

Youth career
- PON Sumsel
- 2015–2016: Sriwijaya U19

Senior career*
Years	Team	Apps	(Gls)
2016–2018	Sriwijaya	9	(3)
2018	→ PSS Sleman (loan)	18	(8)
2019	Persis Solo	10	(2)
2020	PSIM Yogyakarta	1	(0)
2021	Dewa United	12	(6)
2022–2023	Barito Putera	10	(0)
2023–2024	PSKC Cimahi	14	(0)
2024–	Persibo Bojonegoro	5	(0)
- * Club domestic league appearances and goals as of 28 February 2025

Slamet Budiyono (born 15 May 1995), is an Indonesian professional footballer who plays as a winger for Liga 2 club Persibo Bojonegoro.

== Career statistics ==
=== Club ===
As of match played 28 February 2025

Club	Season	League			Cup		Other		Total	
Club	Season	Division	Apps	Goals	Apps	Goals	Apps	Goals	Apps	Goals
Sriwijaya	2016	ISC A	0	0	0	0	0	0	0	0
Sriwijaya	2017	Liga 1	9	3	0	0	0	0	9	3
PSS Sleman	2018	Liga 2	18	8	0	0	0	0	18	8
Sriwijaya	2019	Liga 2	—		3 (Note: Includes Piala Indonesia.)	2	0	0	3	2
Persis Solo	2019	Liga 2	10	2	0	0	0	0	10	2
PSIM Yogyakarta	2020	Liga 2	1	0	0	0	0	0	1	0
Dewa United	2021–22	Liga 2	12	6	0	0	0	0	12	6
Barito Putera	2022–23	Liga 1	10	0	0	0	–		10	0
PSKC Cimahi	2023–24	Liga 2	14	0	0	0	–		14	0
Persibo Bojonegoro	2024–25	Liga 2	5	0	0	0	–		5	0
Career total			79	19	3	2	0	0	82	21

== Honours ==
=== Club ===
PSS Sleman

- Liga 2: 2018

Dewa United

- Liga 2 third place (play-offs): 2021

=== Individual ===
- Liga 2 Best XI: 2021
