= Vinícius Baiano =

Brazilian footballer (born 1997)

Personal information
- Full name: Vinícius Ferreira de Jesus
- Date of birth: 16 July 1997 (age 29)
- Place of birth: Salvador, Brazil
- Height: 1.80 m (5 ft 11 in)
- Positions: Striker; winger

Team information
- Current team: Isenmulang Kalteng
- Number: 97

Youth career
- 2015–2018: Avaí

Senior career*
Years	Team	Apps	(Gls)
2017	→ Fortaleza (loan)	8	(0)
2018	→ Concórdia (loan)	11	(1)
2018	→ Tubarão (loan)	9	(3)
2019	Tubarão	10	(0)
2019	→ Atlético Acreano (loan)	7	(1)
2019	→ Caxias (loan)	7	(0)
2020–2021	Caxias	18	(0)
2022	Aimoré	9	(0)
2022	São Bernardo	4	(0)
2022–2023	Grêmio Prudente	13	(0)
2023–2024	Passo Fundo	14	(2)
2024	Real Noroeste	9	(0)
2024	Glória	14	(4)
2025	Desportiva Ferroviária	12	(4)
2025–2026	Naxxar Lions	30	(4)
2026–	Isenmulang Kalteng	3	(0)
- * Club domestic league appearances and goals as of 19 September 2026

Vinícius Ferreira de Jesus (born 16 July 1997), commonly known as Vinícius Baiano, is a Brazilian professional footballer who plays as a striker or winger for Super League club Isenmulang Kalteng.

== Club career ==
Born in Salvador, Bahia, Brazil, Baiano spent his early career in Brazil at a young age with Avaí. In 2017, he signed for Fortaleza on loan. Baiano returned to Avaí but subsequently served another loans at Concórdia, and Tubarão.

In early 2019, he extended his contract with Tubarão, but was then loaned out again to Atlético Acreano in June 2019, and Caxias in August 2019. After officially leaving Tubarao, in August 2020, Baiano decided to stay and extend his contract with Caxias for the upcoming season.

In December 2022, Baiano joined Grêmio Prudente, he previously plays for Aimoré and São Bernardo.

=== Naxxar Lions ===
In August 2025, Baiano subsequently moved abroad to Europe, signing with Naxxar Lions to play in the first division of the Maltese league system. He made his league debut for Naxxar Lions on 25 August 2025, in a 0–1 home lose over Marsaxlokk. His first league goal for the club came on 16 September 2025 in a 2–3 home lose over Tarxien Rainbows.

On 4 January 2026, he scored in the 2025–26 Maltese FA Trophy of a 0–3 win over Marsa. Four days later, he also involved in Naxxar's 1–2 away win over Żabbar St. Patrick, scoring in the 45th minute at Victor Tedesco Stadium. On 24 January 2026, Baiano scored the winning goal in a 2–1 home win over Żabbar St. Patrick, his goal in the 79th minute sealed the deal, securing all three points.

During his time with the club, Baiano scored a total of 7 goals and 5 assists in 35 appearances in all competitions.

=== Isenmulang Kalteng ===
In August 2026, he moved to Southeast Asia by signing a professional contract with the Indonesian Super League club Isenmulang Kalteng, ahead of the 2026–27 Super League campaign. He made his league debut for Isenmulang Kalteng on 4 September 2026, in a 4–0 away lose over Arema at the Kanjuruhan Stadium.
