= Ramadhan (footballer) =

Indonesian footballer

Personal information
- Date of birth: 1 September 2001 (age 25)
- Place of birth: East Aceh, Indonesia
- Height: 1.67 m (5 ft 6 in)
- Position: Right winger

Team information
- Current team: Isenmulang Kalteng
- Number: 90

Youth career
- 2017: Patriot Labu
- 2018: PPLP Aceh

Senior career*
Years	Team	Apps	(Gls)
2019	Persidi Idi Rayeuk	23	(1)
2020–2022	Persiraja Banda Aceh	18	(0)
2022	PSCS Cilacap	7	(1)
2023–2024	Persiraja Banda Aceh	15	(3)
2024	Semen Padang	7	(0)
2024–2025	Persiraja Banda Aceh	6	(2)
2025–2026	Bekasi City	24	(12)
2026–	Isenmulang Kalteng	2	(0)
- * Club domestic league appearances and goals as of 19 September 2026

Ramadhan (born 1 September 2001), also known as Madon, is an Indonesian professional footballer who plays as a right winger for Super League club Isenmulang Kalteng.

== Club career ==
=== Persiraja Banda Aceh ===
He was signed for Persiraja Banda Aceh to play in Liga 1 in the 2021 season. Ramadhan made his first-team debut on 29 August 2021 in a match against Bhayangkara at the Indomilk Arena, Tangerang.

== Career statistics ==
=== Club ===
As of 19 September 2026.

Club	Season	League		Cup		Continental		Other		Total	
Club	Season	Apps	Goals	Apps	Goals	Apps	Goals	Apps	Goals	Apps	Goals
Persidi Idi	2019	23	1	0	0	–		0	0	23	1
Persiraja Banda Aceh	2021	18	0	0	0	–		0	0	18	0
PSCS Cilacap	2022–23	7	1	0	0	–		0	0	7	1
Persiraja Banda Aceh	2023–24	15	3	0	0	–		0	0	15	3
Semen Padang	2024–25	7	0	0	0	–		0	0	7	0
Persiraja Banda Aceh	2024–25	6	2	0	0	–		0	0	6	2
Bekasi City	2025–26	24	12	0	0	–		0	0	24	12
Isenmulang Kalteng	2026–27	2	0	0	0	–		0	0	2	0
Career total		101	19	0	0	0	0	0	0	101	19
