= Nazar Nurzaidin =

Indonesian footballer

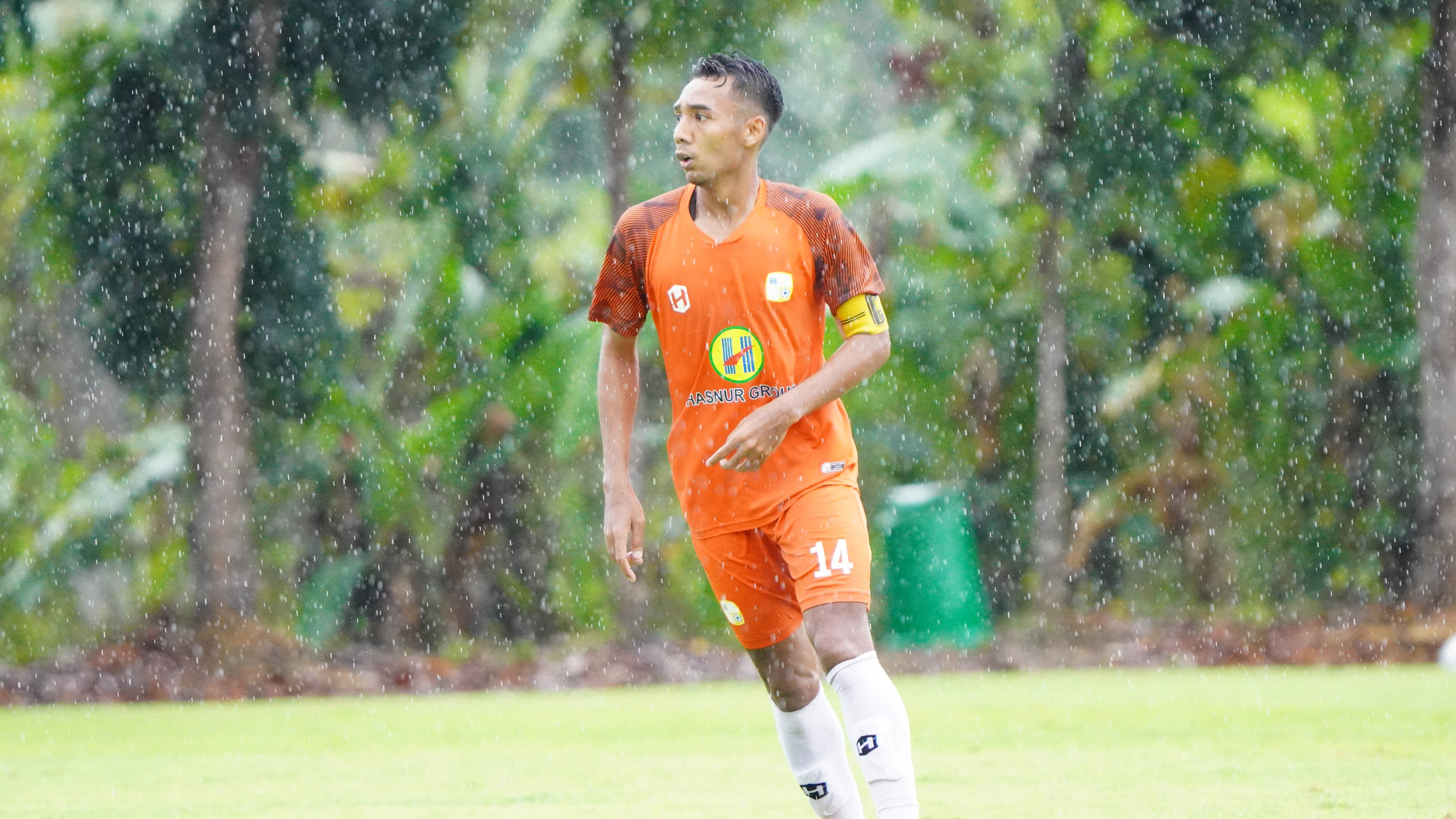

Personal information
- Full name: Nazar Nurzaidin
- Date of birth: 1 January 1995 (age 31)
- Place of birth: Pemalang, Indonesia
- Height: 1.72 m (5 ft 8 in)
- Positions: Full-back; defensive midfielder

Team information
- Current team: Adhyaksa Bekasi
- Number: 12

Youth career
- Persika Karawang
- Rajawali Muda
- Barito Putera

Senior career*
Years	Team	Apps	(Gls)
2015–2025	Barito Putera	145	(2)
2025–2026	PSMS Medan	17	(1)
2026–	Adhyaksa Bekasi	0	(0)
- * Club domestic league appearances and goals as of 23:10, 25 April 2026 (UTC)

Nazar Nurzaidin (born in Pemalang, Indonesia, 1 January 1995) is an Indonesian professional footballer who plays as a full-back for Championship club Adhyaksa Bekasi.

== Club career ==
=== Barito Putera ===
Was born in Pemalang, Nazar started his professional career with Barito Putera in 2015.

== International career ==
He called up for the Indonesia on 21 March 2017 against Myanmar in the friendly.

== Career statistics ==
=== Club ===
As of match played 25 April 2026

Club	Season	League		Cup (Note: Includes Piala Indonesia)		Continental		Other (Note: Appearances in Indonesia President's Cup)		Total	
Club	Season	Apps	Goals	Apps	Goals	Apps	Goals	Apps	Goals	Apps	Goals
Barito Putera	2016	10	1	0	0	0	0	0	0	10	1
Barito Putera	2017	23	0	0	0	0	0	3	0	26	0
Barito Putera	2018	30	0	0	0	0	0	3	0	33	0
Barito Putera	2019	21	0	0	0	0	0	2	0	23	0
Barito Putera	2020	0	0	0	0	0	0	0	0	0	0
Barito Putera	2021–22	10	0	0	0	0	0	3 (Note: Appearances in Menpora Cup)	0	13	0
Barito Putera	2022–23	23	1	0	0	0	0	1	0	24	1
Barito Putera	2023–24	15	0	0	0	0	0	0	0	15	0
Barito Putera	2024–25	13	0	0	0	–		0	0	13	0
Barito Putera	Total	145	2	0	0	0	0	12	0	157	2
PSMS Medan	2025–26	17	1	0	0	–		0	0	17	1
Career total		162	3	0	0	0	0	12	0	174	3
