= Isenmulang Kalteng F.C. =

Indonesian football club

Isenmulang Kalteng
- Full name: Isenmulang Kalimantan Tengah Football Club
- Nickname: Laskar Tambun Bungai (Tambun Bungai Warriors)
- Short name: I.F.C
- Founded: 20 January 2020; 6 years ago, as Farmel Football Club; 18 July 2024; 2 years ago, as Adhyaksa Football Club; 25 July 2026; 3 months ago, as Isenmulang Kalteng Football Club
- Ground: Tuah Pahoe Stadium
- Capacity: 10,000
- Owner: Public Prosecution Service of Indonesia
- CEO: Eko Setyawan
- Head coach: Mundari Karya
- League: Super League
- 2025–26: Championship, 3rd (promoted via playoff)
- Website: farmel.co.id
| Home colours | Away colours | Third colours |

Isenmulang Kalimantan Tengah Football Club, formerly known as Farmel and Adhyaksa, is an Indonesian professional football club based in Palangka Raya, Central Kalimantan. They compete in the Super League, following promotion from the 2025–26 Championship.

== History ==
Founded on 20 January 2020, Farmel made its debut into Indonesian football by joining the third-tier league Indonesia Liga 3. As a first step, Farmel's management has appointed Adnan Mahing as head coach. But this season (2020) competition was cancelled due to the COVID-19 pandemic in Indonesia. On 2 November 2021, Farmel opened their third-tier league season with a 9–0 win against Bintang Junior. On 18 November, Farmel closed the group stage with a 0–0 draw against Jagat. They qualified for the second round as winners of group C with 13 points. In the semi-final match against Matrix Putra Brother's, they qualified to the final with a 3–1 win.

In the buildup towards the 2024–25 Liga 2 season, the club changed their name to Adhyaksa Football Club underneath the stewardship of the Public Prosecution Service of Indonesia. Previously, the service had collaborated with Farmel's owners with the club being known as Adhyaksa Farmel Football Club, winning the 2023–24 Liga 3 title during that period.

On 8 May 2026, Adhyaksa secured promotion to the Super League for the first time in their history from next season after beating Persipura Jayapura 0–1 in the Promotion play-off match.

In 2026, Adhyaksa announced they would move their home base to the Tuah Pahoe Stadium or the Gelora Kie Raha Stadium, later they confirmed they would choose the Tuah Pahoe Stadium as their home base. As part of their relocation and in effort to build a closer connection with the Central Kalimantan community, the club's name will be changed into something that reflects the province's culture, presumably using a phrase in the native Ngaju language. They confirmed they would use the name Isenmulang Kalteng Football Club. This name change was approved in the 2026 PSSI Ordinary Congress with Adhyaksa's name changing to Isenmulang Kalteng.

Additionally, while the Tuah Pahoe Stadium was undergoing renovations to ensure that it would meet Super League standards, Adhyaksa set their sights at the Wibawa Mukti Stadium in Bekasi as their temporary home.

== Controversies ==
In the round of 32 in the national round 2021–22 Liga 3 between Bandung United and Farmel, the referee gave a controversial red cards to Bandung players Saiful, Rizki Arohman, Satrio Azhar, and Andri Febriansyah. As a form of disappointment, Bandung United players let the opposing team win by 3–0.

Previously, in the match against NZR Sumbersari against Farmel there was even a commotion when Farmel received a penalty at the end of the match and made the score of 1–1.

PSBL Langsa also protested the referee's decision which made them lose 4–1 to Farmel. In this match, the referee's leadership was considered detrimental to the Langsa PSBL team, such as the penalty obtained by Farmel.

In the 2021–22 Liga 3, Farmel again benefited from controversial refereeing decisions to defeat Prilly Latuconsina's club Persikota Tangerang 3–0.

Adhyaksa Banten line-up in the 2025–26 Pegadaian Championship third-place play-off against Persipura Jayapura.

== Name and logo changes ==
=== Logo history ===
Adhyaksa (2024–2026)

=== Naming history ===
- Farmel (2020–2022)
- Adhyaksa Farmel (2022–2024)
- Adhyaksa (2024–2026)
- Isenmulang Kalteng (2026–present)

== Supporters ==
Isenmulang Kalteng is supported by a supporter group called Kalteng Mania, which was previously a supporter group for Persepar Palangkaraya and Kalteng Putra.

== Players ==
=== Current squad ===
As of September 2026

Note: Flags indicate national team as defined under FIFA eligibility rules; some limited exceptions apply. Players may hold more than one non-FIFA nationality.

| No. | Pos. | Nation | Player |
|---|---|---|---|
| 1 | GK | BRA | Lucas Frigeri |
| 4 | DF | BRA | Léo Lelis (vice-captain) |
| 5 | DF | IDN | Harli Cahya |
| 7 | FW | POR | Adilson Silva |
| 8 | DF | IDN | Shafa Abdillah |
| 9 | FW | IDN | Muhammad Ridwan |
| 10 | MF | MLI | Makan Konaté |
| 12 | MF | GAM | Modou Manneh |
| 13 | DF | IDN | Muhammad Fayrushi |
| 14 | MF | PHI | Kenji Nishioka |
| 18 | DF | IDN | Ardi Ramdani (captain) |
| 19 | FW | IDN | Satrio Mega |
| 21 | FW | IDN | Fardan Ary |
| 23 | FW | BOL | Adriel Fernández |
| 27 | GK | IDN | Irham Nadzhofa |

| No. | Pos. | Nation | Player |
|---|---|---|---|
| 29 | GK | IDN | Muhammad Reza |
| 30 | MF | IDN | Brayen Pondaag |
| 31 | DF | IDN | Indra Feri |
| 33 | DF | BRA | Rafael Ribeiro |
| 34 | MF | IDN | Galuh Aryanata |
| 37 | DF | IDN | Firman Ramadhan |
| 66 | MF | IDN | Gufroni Al Maruf |
| 67 | FW | IDN | Rafly Ariyanto |
| 74 | DF | BRA | Douglas Cruz |
| 80 | MF | IDN | Roy Sandy |
| 85 | GK | IDN | Jefri Wibowo |
| 89 | GK | IDN | Adre Arido |
| 90 | FW | IDN | Ramadhan |
| 97 | FW | BRA | Vinícius Baiano |
| 99 | FW | BRA | Sergio Mendonça |

== Coaching staff ==
| Position | Name |
|---|---|
| Head coach | (Indonesia) Mundari Karya |
| Assistant coaches | (Indonesia) Ade Suhendra (Indonesia) Agus Indra Kurniawan (Indonesia) Aang Suparman |
| Team manager | (Indonesia) Mochammad Romlih |
| Goalkeeper coach | (Indonesia) Sandy Firmansyah |
| Fitness coach | (Indonesia) Arif Rizalludin |
| Video analyst | (Indonesia) Fajar Rizky |

== Season-by-season records ==
As Adhyaksa Banten

| Season(s) | League/Division | Tier | Tms. | Pos. | Piala Indonesia | AFC competition(s) |
|---|---|---|---|---|---|---|
| 2021–22 | Liga 3 | 3 | 64 | Third round | – | – |
| 2022–23 | Liga 3 | 3 | season abandoned | | – | – |
| 2023–24 | Liga 3 | 3 | 80 | 1st | – | – |
| 2024–25 | Liga 2 | 2 | 26 | 1st, relegation round | – | – |
| 2025–26 | Championship | 2 | 20 | 3rd | – | – |

As Isenmulang Kalteng

| Season(s) | League/Division | Tier | Tms. | Pos. | Piala Indonesia | I-League Cup | AFC competition(s) |
|---|---|---|---|---|---|---|---|
| 2026–27 | Super League | 1 | 18 | TBD | – | TBD | – |

== Honours ==
- Championship
  - Promotion play-off winner: 2025–26
- Liga 3
  - Champions (1): 2023–24
- Liga 3 Banten
  - Champions (1): 2023
  - Runners-up (1): 2021
  - Third-place (1): 2022

== Mascot ==
The hornbill (enggang), a bird endemic to Borneo, is the mascot of Isenmulang Kalteng. In native Dayak culture, the hornbill is sacred and considered a symbol of both the Dayak and Borneo.
