= Sunni Hizbullah =

Indonesian footballer

Personal information
- Full name: Sunni Hizbullah
- Date of birth: 11 March 1994 (age 32)
- Place of birth: Sleman, Indonesia
- Height: 1.80 m (5 ft 11 in)
- Position: Centre back

Team information
- Current team: Bekasi City
- Number: 5

Youth career
- 2012−2014: Persiba Bantul

Senior career*
Years	Team	Apps	(Gls)
2014–2015	Persiba Bantul	2	(1)
2016	PSIM Yogyakarta	18	(0)
2017	PSCS Cilacap	14	(0)
2018	Persiba Balikpapan	3	(1)
2019	PSCS Cilacap	9	(0)
2020–2022	PSIM Yogyakarta	14	(0)
2023–2024	Bekasi City	12	(1)
2024–2025	PSIM Yogyakarta	13	(1)
2025–	Bekasi City	13	(1)
- * Club domestic league appearances and goals as of 19:44, 22 February 2026 (UTC)

Sunni Hizbullah (born 11 March 1994) is an Indonesian professional footballer who plays as a centre back for Liga 2 club Bekasi City.

== Club career ==
=== Persiba Bantul ===
Hizbullah started his career by joining Persiba Bantul U-21. On 21 August 2014, he made his first team debut in the Indonesia Super League against Persiram Raja Ampat; Persiba lost 0–3. Hizbullah scored his first goal for Persiba on 5 September 2014, which ended in a 3–2 victory against Persiba Balikpapan.

== Honours ==
PSIM Yogyakarta

- Liga 2: 2024–25
