= Pedrinho (footballer, born 1993) =

Brazilian footballer

Personal information
- Full name: João Pedro Oliveira Santos
- Date of birth: 18 June 1993 (age 33)
- Place of birth: Barreiras, Brazil
- Height: 1.72 m (5 ft 8 in)
- Positions: Attacking midfielder; winger

Team information
- Current team: Mount Druitt Town Rangers
- Number: 10

Youth career
- 2004–2009: Athletico Paranaense
- 2009–2010: São Paulo
- 2010–2011: Flamengo

Senior career*
Years	Team	Apps	(Gls)
2013–2015	Flamengo B	0	(0)
2013	→ Bahia de Feira (loan)	3	(0)
2014	→ América de Natal (loan)	2	(0)
2015	→ América (loan)	0	(0)
2015–2016	Tarxien Rainbows	31	(8)
2017	América	9	(0)
2017–2018	Dila	16	(1)
2018	Atlântico	1	(0)
2019	Linköping City	3	(0)
2020–2021	Pembroke Athleta	50	(12)
2021–2022	Lija Athletic	12	(7)
2022	Pietà Hotspurs	6	(0)
2022–2023	Għajnsielem	19	(9)
2023–2024	Persikabo 1973	31	(4)
2024	PSIM Yogyakarta	3	(0)
2024–	Mount Druitt Town Rangers	14	(3)
- * Club domestic league appearances and goals as of 17 May 2025

João Pedro Oliveira Santos (born 18 June 1993), commonly known as Pedrinho, is a Brazilian professional footballer who last plays as an attacking midfielder or winger for National Premier Leagues NSW club Mount Druitt Town Rangers.

== Club career ==
Born in Barreiras, Bahia, Pedrinho represented three clubs as a youth - Athletico Paranaense, São Paulo, Flamengo. On 6 March 2013, he was loaned to Bahia de Feira for the season's Baiano campaign. On 17 December, he was loaned to América de Natal.

On 6 July 2017, Pedrinho signed with Georgian club Dila Gori after stints with Maltese club Tarxien Rainbows and Brazilian club América.

In 2019, Pedrinho returned to Malta and joined Pembroke Athleta.
