= Valente, Bahia =

Coordinates: 11°34′S 39°27′W

Valente
- Municipality
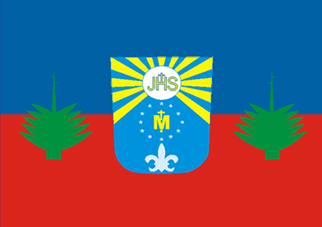
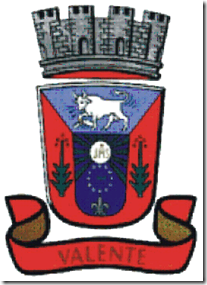
- Flag Coat of arms
- Interactive map of Valente
- Country: Brazil
- Region: Northeast
- State: Bahia

Population (2020)
  - Total: 28,800
- Time zone: UTC−3 (BRT)

Valente is a municipality in the state of Bahia in the North-East region of Brazil.

== See also ==
- List of municipalities in Bahia
