= Jordan Zamorano =

Indonesian footballer

Personal information
- Full name: Mohammad Jordan Zamorano
- Date of birth: 7 February 2001 (age 25)
- Place of birth: Kediri, Indonesia
- Height: 1.76 m (5 ft 9 in)
- Position: Defensive midfielder

Team information
- Current team: Gresik United
- Number: 24

Youth career
- 2015–2017: Triple'S
- 2018–2019: PSS Sleman

Senior career*
Years	Team	Apps	(Gls)
2020–2024	Persik Kediri	3	(0)
2022	→ Persela Lamongan (loan)	4	(0)
2023	→ Nusantara United (loan)	1	(0)
2023–2024	→ Sada Sumut (loan)	6	(0)
2024	Persikas Subang	12	(0)
2025	Persiku Kudus	0	(0)
2026	Persipal Palu	7	(0)
2026–	Gresik United	2	(0)
- * Club domestic league appearances and goals as of 17 November 2026

Mohammad Jordan Zamorano (born 7 February 2001) is an Indonesian professional footballer who plays as a defensive midfielder for Liga Nusantara club Gresik United.

== Club career ==
=== Persik Kediri ===
He was signed for Persik Kediri to play in Liga 1 in the 2020 season. Jordan made his first-team debut on 29 September 2021 as a substitute in a match against Bhayangkara at the Gelora Bung Karno Madya Stadium, Jakarta.

==== Loan to Persela Lamongan ====
On 2022, Zamorano signed with Liga 2 club Persela Lamongan, on loan from Persik Kediri. He made 4 league appearances for Persela in the 2022–23 Liga 2.

=== Persikas Subang ===
On 30 July 2024, he was officially introduced as a Persikas Subang player for the 2024–25 Liga 2 season.

== Career statistics ==
=== Club ===
As of 17 November 2026

Club	Season	League			Cup		Continental		Other		Total	
Club	Season	Division	Apps	Goals	Apps	Goals	Apps	Goals	Apps	Goals	Apps	Goals
Persik Kediri	2020	Liga 1	0	0	0	0	–		0	0	0	0
Persik Kediri	2021	Liga 1	3	0	0	0	–		2 (Note: Appearances in Menpora Cup)	0	5	0
Persik Kediri	2022–23	Liga 1	0	0	0	0	–		0	0	0	0
Persela Lamongan (loan)	2022–23	Liga 2	4	0	0	0	–		0	0	4	0
Nusantara United (loan)	2023–24	Liga 2	1	0	0	0	–		0	0	1	0
Sada Sumut (loan)	2023–24	Liga 2	6	0	0	0	–		0	0	6	0
Persikas Subang	2024–25	Liga 2	12	0	0	0	–		0	0	12	0
Persiku Kudus	2025–26	Liga 2	0	0	0	0	–		0	0	0	0
Persipal Palu	2025–26	Liga 2	7	0	0	0	–		0	0	7	0
Gresik United	2026–27	Liga Nusantara	2	0	0	0	–		0	0	2	0
Career total			34	0	0	0	0	0	2	0	36	0
