= Hari Habrian =

Indonesian footballer

Personal information
- Full name: Hari Habrian
- Date of birth: 28 April 1992 (age 34)
- Place of birth: Serang, Indonesia
- Height: 1.60 m (5 ft 3 in)
- Position: Midfielder

Team information
- Current team: Perserang Serang
- Number: 5

Youth career
- 2012–2013: Persita Tangerang

Senior career*
Years	Team	Apps	(Gls)
2013–2017	Persita Tangerang	53	(6)
2018	Cilegon United	18	(1)
2018	Persita Tangerang	9	(3)
2019	Perserang Serang	19	(8)
2020–2021	Sriwijaya	11	(1)
2022	PSMS Medan	5	(0)
2023–2024	PSPS Riau	15	(0)
2024–	Perserang Serang	26	(7)
- * Club domestic league appearances and goals as of 9 January 2026

Hari Habrian (born 28 April 1992) is an Indonesian professional footballer who plays as a midfielder for Liga Nusantara club Perserang Serang.

== Club career ==
=== Persita Tangerang ===
He made his debut when against Persikabo Bogor in the first week of the 2016 Indonesia Soccer Championship B.
