= Syarif Wijianto =

Indonesian footballer

Personal information
- Full name: Syarif Wijianto
- Date of birth: 25 August 1994 (age 32)
- Place of birth: Semarang, Indonesia
- Height: 1.78 m (5 ft 10 in)
- Positions: Defender; defensive midfielder

Senior career*
Years	Team	Apps	(Gls)
2016	Persita Tangerang	1	(0)
2017	Persijap Jepara	11	(1)
2018	Persita Tangerang	16	(0)
2019–2020	Cilegon United	20	(0)
2021–2022	PSIM Yogyakarta	19	(2)
2022	→ Persela Lamongan (loan)	13	(0)
2023–2024	Malut United	5	(0)
2024	Persekat Tegal	3	(0)
2024–2025	Persiku Kudus	10	(0)
2025–2026	PSMS Medan	11	(0)
- * Club domestic league appearances and goals as of 2 May 2026

Syarif Wijianto (born 25 August 1994) is an Indonesian professional footballer who plays as a defender or defensive midfielder.

== Club career ==
=== PSIM Yogyakarta ===
In 2021, Syarif signed a contract with Indonesian Liga 2 club PSIM Yogyakarta. He made his league debut on 26 September 2021 in a match against PSCS Cilacap at the Manahan Stadium, Surakarta.

==== Persela Lamongan (loan) ====
He was signed for Persela Lamongan to play in Liga 1 in the 2021 season. Syarif made his league debut on 11 January 2022 in a match against Persita Tangerang at the Ngurah Rai Stadium, Denpasar.

== Career statistics ==
=== Club ===
As of 2 May 2026

Club	Season	League			Domestic Cup		Continental		Other		Total	
Club	Season	Division	Apps	Goals	Apps	Goals	Apps	Goals	Apps	Goals	Apps	Goals
Persita Tangerang	2016	ISC B	1	0	0	0	–		0	0	1	0
Persijap Jepara	2017	Liga 2	11	1	0	0	–		0	0	11	1
Persita Tangerang	2018	Liga 2	16	0	0	0	–		0	0	16	0
Cilegon United	2019	Liga 2	19	0	0	0	–		0	0	19	0
Cilegon United	2020	Liga 2	1	0	0	0	–		0	0	1	0
Cilegon United	Total		20	0	0	0	0	0	0	0	20	0
PSIM Yogyakarta	2021	Liga 2	12	1	0	0	–		0	0	12	1
PSIM Yogyakarta	2022	Liga 2	7	1	0	0	–		0	0	7	1
Persela Lamongan (loan)	2021	Liga 1	13	0	0	0	–		0	0	13	0
Maluku Utara United	2023–24	Liga 2	5	0	0	0	0	0	—		5	0
Persekat Tegal	2024–25	Liga 2	3	0	0	0	0	0	0	0	3	0
Persiku Kudus	2024–25	Liga 2	10	0	0	0	–		0	0	10	0
PSMS Medan	2025–26	Championship	11	0	0	0	–		0	0	11	0
Career total			109	3	0	0	0	0	0	0	109	3

== Honours ==
Malut United

- Liga 2 third place (play-offs): 2023–24
