= Didik Wahyu =

Indonesian footballer

Personal information
- Full name: Didik Wahyu Wijayance
- Date of birth: 13 February 1994 (age 32)
- Place of birth: Rembang, Indonesia
- Height: 1.77 m (5 ft 10 in)
- Position: Centre back

Team information
- Current team: Adhyaksa Bekasi
- Number: 13

Senior career*
Years	Team	Apps	(Gls)
2014–2017	PSIR Rembang	19	(0)
2018–2024	Persikabo 1973	99	(3)
2024–2025	Persik Kediri	4	(0)
2025–2026	Sumsel United	13	(0)
2026–	Adhyaksa Bekasi	2	(0)

International career
2021	Indonesia	1	(0)
- * Club domestic league appearances and goals as of 23:05, 18 September 2026 (UTC)

Didik Wahyu Wijayance (born 13 February 1994) is an Indonesian professional footballer who plays as a centre back for Championship club Adhyaksa Bekasi. He is also a soldier in the Indonesian Army.

== Club career ==
=== PSIR Rembang ===
In 2017, Didik Wahyu signed a contract with Indonesian Liga 2 club PSIR Rembang.

=== TIRA-Persikabo / Persikabo 1973 ===
Didik Wahyu in 2018 signed for Liga 1 club Persikabo 1973 to play in the 2018 Liga 1 (Indonesia) season. He made his league debut on 30 April 2018 in a match against Bali United at the Sultan Agung Stadium, Bantul.

== International career ==
Didik Wahyu, who has no experience playing in junior national teams, received a call to join the Indonesia national team in May 2021. He made his debut for that team in the 2022 FIFA World Cup qualification match against United Arab Emirates on 11 June 2021.

== Career statistics ==
=== Club ===
As of match played 18 September 2026

Club	Season	League			Cup		Continental		Other		Total	
Club	Season	Division	Apps	Goals	Apps	Goals	Apps	Goals	Apps	Goals	Apps	Goals
PSIR Rembang	2014	Premier Division	10	0	0	0	—		0	0	10	0
PSIR Rembang	2015	Premier Division	0	0	0	0	—		0	0	0	0
PSIR Rembang	2017	Liga 2	9	0	0	0	—		0	0	9	0
PSIR Rembang	Total		19	0	0	0	—		0	0	19	0
Persikabo 1973	2018	Liga 1	21	0	0	0	—		0	0	21	0
Persikabo 1973	2019	Liga 1	1	0	0	0	—		0	0	1	0
Persikabo 1973	2020	Liga 1	1	0	0	0	—		0	0	1	0
Persikabo 1973	2021–22	Liga 1	20	1	0	0	—		3 (Note: Appearances in Menpora Cup)	0	23	1
Persikabo 1973	2022–23	Liga 1	27	0	0	0	—		2 (Note: Appearances in Indonesia President's Cup)	0	29	0
Persikabo 1973	2023–24	Liga 1	29	2	0	0	–		0	0	29	2
Persikabo 1973	Total		99	3	0	0	—		5	0	104	3
Persik Kediri	2024–25	Liga 1	4	0	0	0	—		0	0	4	0
Sumsel United	2025–26	Championship	13	0	0	0	0	0	0	0	13	0
Adhyaksa Bekasi	2026–27	Championship	2	0	0	0	0	0	0	0	2	0
Career total			137	3	0	0	—		5	0	142	3

=== International ===
As of match played 11 June 2021

Appearances and goals by national team and year
National team	Year	Apps	Goals
Indonesia	2021	1	0
Total		1	0
