= Tuah Pahoe Stadium =

Football stadium in Indonesia

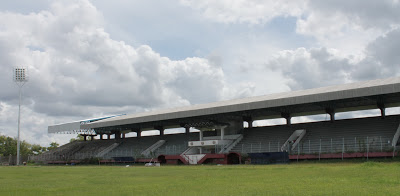
- Tuah Pahoe Stadium

- Location in Kalimantan
- Location: Palangka Raya, Central Kalimantan, Indonesia
- Coordinates: 2°10′35.3″S 113°53′04.4″E
- Owner: Government of Palangka Raya Municipalities
- Operator: Government of Palangka Raya Municipalities
- Capacity: 10,000
- Surface: Grass field

Construction
- Cost: Rp 12.5 billion ($800 thousand)

Tenants
- Kalteng Putra; Isenmulang Kalteng (2026–present)

Tuah Pahoe Stadium is the name of a football stadium in the city of Palangka Raya, Central Kalimantan, Indonesia. It was named after the tenth Mayor of Palangka Raya City. It is used as the home venue for Kalteng Putra and Isenmulang Kalteng of the Liga Indonesia. The stadium has a capacity of 10,000.

== History ==
In June 2026, the stadium was chosen as the home base of Adhyaksa for the 2026–27 Super League season. The Central Kalimantan Provincial Government announced plans to renovate the stadium.
