= 2021–22 Liga 2 (Indonesia) =

Liga 2
- Season: 2021
- Dates: 26 September – 30 December 2021
- Champions: Persis (1st title)
- Promoted: Persis; RANS Cilegon; Dewa United
- Relegated: Badak Lampung; Hizbul Wathan; Mitra Kukar; Tiga Naga
- Matches: 136
- Goals: 292 (2.15 per match)
- Best player: Rifal Lastori
- Top goalscorer: Alberto Gonçalves (11 goals)
- Biggest home win: Badak Lampung 4–1 Perserang (25 October 2021); Persis 5–2 Persijap (9 November 2021); Kalteng Putra 3–0 PSBS (17 November 2021); Persekat 4–1 Perserang (22 November 2021); RANS Cilegon 3–0 PSKC (1 December 2021)
- Biggest away win: PSPS 0–3 Sriwijaya (15 October 2021); Hizbul Wathan 1–4 PSG Pati (25 October 2021)
- Highest scoring: Persis 5–2 Persijap (9 November 2021); RANS Cilegon 4–3 Persis (15 December 2021)
- Longest winning run: 6 matches Dewa United
- Longest unbeaten run: 12 matches PSIM
- Longest winless run: 10 matches Hizbul Wathan
- Longest losing run: 5 matches Hizbul Wathan
- Highest attendance: 269; Sulut United 0–2 Dewa United (20 December 2021)
- Lowest attendance: 113; Sriwijaya 2–1 Persiba (15 December 2021)
- Total attendance: 2392
- Average attendance: 199

The 2021 Liga 2 was the fifth season of the Liga 2 under its current name and the 12th season under its current league structure.

Persis won the title after a 2–1 win over RANS Cilegon in the final at Pakansari Stadium, Cibinong on 30 December 2021.

== Effects of the COVID-19 pandemic ==
=== Cancellation of the 2020 season ===
The season was suspended on 15 March 2020 after finishing the matchday one due to the COVID-19 pandemic. The initial suspension was until the end of March, which was then extended to 29 May. On 27 June 2020, PSSI issued a decree to continue Liga 1, Liga 2 & Liga 3 from October 2020.

On 7 August 2020, PT Liga Indonesia Baru made several announcements. The season restarted from the beginning with a different format. In the first round, 24 teams were drawn into four groups consisting of six teams. All groups are played a home tournament format where teams play each other once. Group winners and runners-ups will be advance to the second round, which will be drawn into two groups of four. Two best teams will be qualified to the semi-finals. Semi-finals and final will be played a single-legged fixtures. Two finalists will be promoted to Liga 1. All matches are held and played behind closed doors.

After failing to obtain government and police permissions for the umpteenth time, PSSI on 29 September 2020 announced the second postponement of the 2020 season of Liga 1 and Liga 2. This time the initial suspension had a one-month period. After the end date was reached, PSSI on 29 October 2020 declared the 2020 football seasons could not be held in 2020. There was an attempt to resume the 2020 season in 2021. However, on 15 January 2021, PSSI decided to cancel the 2020 season of all football competitions and declared them void.

== Teams ==
=== Team changes ===
The following teams changed division after the 2019 season.

To Liga 2

Relegated from Liga 1

- Badak Lampung
- Kalteng Putra
- Semen Padang

Promoted from Liga 3

- Persijap
- PSKC
- Tiga Naga
- Persekat
- Putra Safin Group (formerly Putra Sinar Giri)
- Hizbul Wathan (formerly Semeru)
From Liga 2

Promoted to Liga 1

- Persik
- Persita
- Persiraja

Relegated to Liga 3

- PSGC
- Persibat
- Bandung United
- Madura
- Persatu
- PSMP

=== Name changes ===
- Semeru relocated to Sidoarjo and were renamed to Hizbul Wathan.
- Babel United merged with Muba United into Muba Babel United and relocated to Musi Banyuasin.
- Putra Sinar Giri relocated to Pati and were renamed to Putra Safin Group Pati (PSG Pati). However, in June 2021, the club was acquired by Atta Halilintar and renamed themselves again into AHHA PS Pati, although the name change won't come into effect until next season.
- Martapura relocated to Tangerang and were renamed to Dewa United.
- Cilegon United were bought out by Raffi Ahmad and rebranded themselves into RANS Cilegon.

=== Stadiums and locations ===
Locations of the 2021 Liga 2 teams

Team	Location	Stadium	Capacity
Badak Lampung	Bandar Lampung	Sumpah Pemuda	25,000
Dewa United	Tangerang	Indomilk Arena	15,000
Hizbul Wathan	Sidoarjo	Gelora Delta	35,000
Kalteng Putra	Palangka Raya	Tuah Pahoe	5,000
Mitra Kukar	Tenggarong	Aji Imbut	35,000
Muba Babel United	Musi Banyuasin	Serasan Sekate	5,000
Persekat	Tegal	Tri Sanja	10,000
Perserang	Serang	Maulana Yusuf	15,000
Persewar	Waropen	Cendrawasih	15,000
Persiba	Balikpapan	Batakan	40,000
Persijap	Jepara	Gelora Bumi Kartini	20,000
Persis	Surakarta	Manahan	20,000
PSBS	Biak Numfor	Cendrawasih	15,000
PSCS	Cilacap	Wijayakusuma	10,000
PSG Pati	Pati	Joyokusumo	20,000
PSIM	Yogyakarta	Mandala Krida	35,000
PSKC	Cimahi	Siliwangi	10,000
PSMS	Medan	Teladan	20,000
PSPS	Pekanbaru	Kaharudin Nasution	25,000
RANS Cilegon	Cilegon	Krakatau Steel	25,000
Semen Padang	Padang	Haji Agus Salim	20,000
Sriwijaya	Palembang	Gelora Sriwijaya	23,000
Sulut United	Manado	Klabat	10,000
Tiga Naga	Kampar	Tuanku Tambusai	25,000

=== Personnel and kits ===
Note: Flags indicate national team as has been defined under FIFA eligibility rules. Players and coaches may hold more than one non-FIFA nationality.

Team	Head coach	Captain	Kit manufacturer	Shirt Sponsor(s)
Badak Lampung	(Indonesia) Rudy Keltjes	(Indonesia) Talaohu Musafri	(Indonesia) Adhoc	Sunpride^{1}, Indofood^{1}, M-150^{1}, Kredit Plus^{2}
Dewa United	(Indonesia) Kas Hartadi	(Indonesia) Shahar Ginanjar	(Indonesia) Mills	Jeep DAS Indonesia^{1}
Hizbul Wathan	(Indonesia) Freddy Muli	(Indonesia) Taufiq Kasrun	(Indonesia) HW Sport	Universitas Muhammadiyah Surabaya^{1}, JConnect^{1}, Universitas Muhammadiyah Malang^{1}, Universitas Muhammadiyah Yogyakarta^{1}, Parahita Diagnostic Center^{2}, Universitas Muhammadiyah Surakarta^{2}, Universitas Muhammadiyah Sidoarjo^{3}
Kalteng Putra	(Indonesia) Eko Tamamie	(Indonesia) Tamsil Sijaya	(Indonesia) WWJD Sport	Halo Dayak^{1}, Bank Kalteng^{1}
Mitra Kukar	(Spain) Rafael Berges	(Indonesia) Anindito Wahyu	(Spain) Joma	ABP Energy^{1}
Muba Babel United	(Indonesia) Ibnu Grahan	(Indonesia) Atep Rizal	(Indonesia) Rich Sport	Muba Corporate Forum^{1}, Bank Sumsel Babel^{1}
Persekat	Vacant	(Indonesia) Arif Suyono	(Indonesia) WWJD Sport	Tegal Road Construction^{1}, Merdeka Bahari Indonesia^{1}, Mitra Siaga^{2}, STIKES Bhamada Slawi^{3}
Perserang	(Indonesia) Widyantoro	(Indonesia) Idang Novriza	(Indonesia) CRV	Serang Bangkit^{1}, Epajewel^{1}, Bank BJB^{1}, GG Energy^{2}, Dipankara Energy^{2}, Universitas Primagraha^{3}
Persewar	(Indonesia) Elie Aiboy	(Indonesia) Izaac Wanggai	(Indonesia) Adhoc	Bank Papua^{1}, Waropen Regency^{2}
Persiba	Vacant	(Indonesia) Bryan Cesar	(Indonesia) GW Apparel	Indika Energy^{1}, Podiy Beauty Studio^{1}, NG Corporation^{3}
Persijap	(Indonesia) Jaya Hartono	(Indonesia) Ardan Aras	(Indonesia) Degree	Oasis Waters^{1}^{2}, Oasis+^{1}^{3}, Oasis Blu^{1},
Persis	(Indonesia) Eko Purdjianto	(Indonesia) Eky Taufik	(Indonesia) Made by club	Free Fire^{1}, Gurih^{1}, Bank Aladin^{1}, Wilmar^{1}, Gojek^{1}, Vidio^{2}, IDExpress^{2}
PSBS	(Indonesia) Ega Raka Ghalih	(Indonesia) Patrias Rumere	(Indonesia) Artland	Bank Papua^{1}, Biak Numfor Regency^{1}, Pesona Biak^{2}, Benneta Voice^{3}
PSCS	(Indonesia) Frans Sinatra Huwae	(Indonesia) Mochamad Arifin	(Indonesia) Artland	S2P^{1}, Bank Jateng^{1}, Artland^{2}
PSG Pati	(Indonesia) Joko Susilo	(Indonesia) Nugroho Fatchur	(Indonesia) Mills	AHHA^{1}, PStore^{1}, The Legion Nutrition^{1}, Oppo^{1}, BEAUZ^{1}, Pansaka^{1}, PStore Glow^{1}^{2}^{3}, Minyak Balur Sagalo Galo^{1}, vivo^{2}, Madmoisha^{2}, Goklat^{2}, Didimax^{2}
PSIM	(Indonesia) Seto Nurdiantoro	(Indonesia) Aditya Putra	(Indonesia) Seven Stars	Bukalapak^{1}, Smartfren^{1}, Vidio^{1}, Buana Capital^{1}, Krating Daeng^{1}, Red Bull^{1}, Tolak Angin^{2}
PSKC	(Indonesia) Robby Darwis	(Indonesia) Khokok Roniarto	(Indonesia) Adhoc	Come From Behind^{1}, Brigade Infanteri 15/Kujang II Cimahi^{1}
PSMS	(Indonesia) Ansyari Lubis	(Indonesia) Syaiful Ramadhan	(Indonesia) Adhoc	Pelindo I^{1}, Bank Sumut^{1}, Inalum^{1}, Perkebunan Nusantara^{2}, PDAM Tirtanadi^{3}
PSPS	Vacant	(Indonesia) Danil Junaidi	(Malaysia) 93 Sports	Zamburger^{1}
RANS Cilegon	(Indonesia) Rahmad Darmawan	(Indonesia) Hamka Hamzah	(Singapore) HUNDRED	Torabika Gilus Mix^{1}, Juragan99 Corporation^{1}, Tokopedia^{1}, Rajacoin^{1}, Bank Aladin^{1}, Tiket.com^{1}, SiCepat Ekspres^{1}, Citilink^{1}, Lemonilo^{2}, RANS Entertainment^{2}, Prestige Image Motorcars^{2}, Extra Joss^{3}
Semen Padang	(Indonesia) Hendri Susilo	(Indonesia) Dedi Gusmawan	(Indonesia) XTen	Semen Padang^{1}^{3}, Le Minerale^{1}, NG Corporation^{1}
Sriwijaya	(Indonesia) Nil Maizar	(Indonesia) Nur Iskandar	(Indonesia) Tweve Sport	Bukit Asam^{1}, Bank Sumsel Babel^{1}, Bara Coal^{1}
Sulut United	(Indonesia) Ricky Nelson	(Indonesia) Dirga Lasut	(Indonesia) Mills	Minahasa Cahaya Lestari^{1}, Nusadana^{1}
Tiga Naga	(Indonesia) Felyandes Rozialta	(Indonesia) Ghulam Fatkur	(Indonesia) Days Apparel	Aulia Hospital^{1}, Hydro Coco^{2}

Notes:

1. On the front of shirt.
2. On the back of shirt.
3. On the sleeves.
4. On the shorts.

=== Coaching changes ===
Team	Outgoing coach	Manner of departure	Date of vacancy	Week	Table	Incoming coach	Date of appointment
PSG Pati	(Indonesia) Ibnu Grahan	Resigned	8 October 2021	3	6th in Group C	(Indonesia) Joko Susilo	9 October 2021
Badak Lampung	(Indonesia) Budiarjo Thalib	Resigned	21 October 2021	4	6th in Group B	(Indonesia) Rudy Keltjes	25 October 2021
Perserang	(Indonesia) Putut Wijanarko	Sacked	27 October 2021	5	4th in Group B	(Indonesia) Widyantoro	30 October 2021
Muba Babel United	(Indonesia) Sasi Kirono	Demoted to assistant coach	27 October 2021	5	6th in Group A	(Indonesia) Ibnu Grahan	28 October 2021
Semen Padang	(Indonesia) Weliansyah	Resigned	29 October 2021	5	5th in Group A	(Indonesia) Hendri Susilo	30 October 2021
Persiba	(Argentina) Alfredo Vera	Sacked	1 November 2021	5	4th in Group D	(Indonesia) Fakhri Husaini	1 November 2021
Hizbul Wathan	(Indonesia) Herrie Setyawan	Sacked	3 November 2021	6	6th in Group C	(Indonesia) Freddy Muli	6 November 2021
RANS Cilegon	(Indonesia) Bambang Nurdiansyah	Became technical director	11 November 2021	7	3rd in Group B	(Indonesia) Rahmad Darmawan	11 November 2021
Persekat	(Indonesia) I Putu Gede	Signed by PSS	20 December 2021	–	3rd in Group B		
PSPS	(Indonesia) Jafri Sastra	Signed by Persela	20 December 2021	–	3rd in Group A		
Persiba	(Indonesia) Fakhri Husaini	Signed by Borneo	22 January 2022	–	4th in Group X		

== Draw ==
The draw of the tournament was held on 16 September 2021. The draw resulted in the following groups:

Group A
Pos	Team
A1	Sriwijaya
A2	PSPS
A3	Tiga Naga
A4	Semen Padang
A5	PSMS
A6	Muba Babel United

Group B
Pos	Team
B1	Dewa United
B2	Perserang
B3	RANS Cilegon
B4	Badak Lampung
B5	PSKC
B6	Persekat

Group C
Pos	Team
C1	Persis
C2	Persijap
C3	PSCS
C4	PSIM
C5	Hizbul Wathan
C6	Putra Safin Group

Group D
Pos	Team
D1	Kalteng Putra
D2	Mitra Kukar
D3	Persiba
D4	Sulut United
D5	PSBS
D6	Persewar

== First round ==
=== Group A ===
- Matches in the first half were played in Gelora Sriwijaya Stadium, Palembang, South Sumatra, while the second half were played in Kaharudin Nasution Stadium, Pekanbaru, Riau.

Pos	Team	Pld	W	D	L	GF	GA	GD	Pts	Qualification or relegation	SRI	MED	RIA	SPD	MUB	TNG
1	Sriwijaya	10	6	2	2	14	6	+8	20	Advance to the second round	—	1–2	0–1	2–1	1–0	2–0
2	PSMS	10	5	4	1	15	8	+7	19	Advance to the second round	0–0	—	2–0	2–2	2–0	3–1
3	PSPS	10	4	3	3	8	9	−1	15		0–3	1–0	—	1–1	1–0	0–1
4	Semen Padang	10	2	4	4	10	12	−2	10		1–1	1–2	1–1	—	1–0	1–0
5	Muba Babel United	10	2	3	5	5	10	−5	9		0–2	1–1	0–0	1–0	—	1–1
6	Tiga Naga (R)	10	2	2	6	9	16	−7	8	Relegation to Liga 3	1–2	1–1	1–3	2–1	1–2	—

Source: Liga 2 2021
Legend: Blue = home team win; Yellow = draw; Red = away team win.
Rules for classification: 1) Points; 2) Head-to-head; 3) Goal difference; 4) Goals scored; 5) Drawing.
(R) Relegated

=== Group B ===
- All matches were played in Madya Stadium, Central Jakarta, Jakarta.

Pos	Team	Pld	W	D	L	GF	GA	GD	Pts	Qualification or relegation	DEW	RNS	KAT	SER	PKC	BDL
1	Dewa United	10	7	1	2	15	5	+10	22	Advance to the second round	—	3–1	0–1	0–1	2–0	3–1
2	RANS Cilegon	10	6	2	2	13	7	+6	20 (Note: Head-to-head results: Persekat 1–2 RANS Cilegon; RANS Cilegon 0–0 Persekat.)	Advance to the second round	0–1	—	0–0	0–0	3–0	1–0
3	Persekat	10	6	2	2	15	8	+7	20		0–2	1–2	—	4–1	1–0	3–1
4	Perserang	10	4	1	5	10	17	−7	13		0–2	1–2	1–3	—	2–1	1–0
5	PSKC	10	2	1	7	8	16	−8	7		1–1	1–2	0–1	1–2	—	3–2
6	Badak Lampung (R)	10	1	1	8	9	17	−8	4	Relegation to Liga 3	0–1	0–2	1–1	4–1	0–1	—

Source: Liga 2 2021
Legend: Blue = home team win; Yellow = draw; Red = away team win.
Rules for classification: 1) Points; 2) Head-to-head; 3) Goal difference; 4) Goals scored; 5) Drawing.
(R) Relegated

=== Group C ===
- All matches were played in Manahan Stadium, Surakarta, Central Java.

Pos	Team	Pld	W	D	L	GF	GA	GD	Pts	Qualification or relegation	SOL	YOG	CLP	PJP	PSG	HZW
1	Persis	10	6	2	2	19	8	+11	20	Advance to the second round	—	0–1	1–2	5–2	2–0	2–1
2	PSIM	10	5	4	1	12	6	+6	19	Advance to the second round	0–0	—	1–1	2–2	1–0	1–1
3	PSCS	10	4	4	2	8	7	+1	16		0–2	1–0	—	1–1	2–1	0–0
4	Persijap	10	2	6	2	12	13	−1	12		1–1	0–1	0–0	—	1–0	1–1
5	PSG Pati (Note: PSG Pati were deducted three points due to PSSI Disciplinary Committee sanction.)	10	2	2	6	9	15	−6	5		0–3 (Note: PSSI Disciplinary Committee declared PSG Pati lost 3–0 to Persis because they played a player being suspended under a Disciplinary Committee punishment. The original score was 1–1.)	0–2	1–0	2–2	—	1–1
6	Hizbul Wathan (R)	10	0	4	6	7	18	−11	4	Relegation to Liga 3	1–3	1–3	0–1	0–2	1–4	—

Source: Liga 2 2021
Legend: Blue = home team win; Yellow = draw; Red = away team win.
Rules for classification: 1) Points; 2) Head-to-head; 3) Goal difference; 4) Goals scored; 5) Drawing.
(R) Relegated

=== Group D ===
- Matches in the first half were played in Tuah Pahoe Stadium, Palangka Raya, Central Kalimantan, while the second half were played in Batakan Stadium, Balikpapan, East Kalimantan.

Pos	Team	Pld	W	D	L	GF	GA	GD	Pts	Qualification or relegation	SUL	PBA	PWR	KTP	BIA	MKU
1	Sulut United	10	3	6	1	11	8	+3	15 (Note: Head-to-head results: Persiba 1–1 Sulut United; Sulut United 1–1 Persiba.)	Advance to the second round	—	1–1	1–1	2–0	1–1	2–2
2	Persiba	10	4	3	3	9	8	+1	15	Advance to the second round	1–1	—	0–1	0–0	2–0	1–3
3	Persewar	10	3	4	3	10	9	+1	13 (Note: Head-to-head results: Kalteng Putra 2–1 Persewar; Persewar 3–1 Kalteng Putra.)		0–0	1–2	—	3–1	1–1	2–0
4	Kalteng Putra	10	4	1	5	8	10	−2	13		0–1	1–0	2–1	—	3–0	0–1
5	PSBS	10	3	3	4	9	12	−3	12 (Note: Head-to-head results: Mitra Kukar 1–1 PSBS; PSBS 2–1 Mitra Kukar.)		2–1	0–1	2–0	0–1	—	2–1
6	Mitra Kukar (R)	10	3	3	4	10	10	0	12	Relegation to Liga 3	0–1	0–1	0–0	2–0	1–1	—

Source: Liga 2 2021
Legend: Blue = home team win; Yellow = draw; Red = away team win.
Rules for classification: 1) Points; 2) Head-to-head; 3) Goal difference; 4) Goals scored; 5) Drawing.
(R) Relegated

== Second round ==
The top two teams of each group will advance to the semi-finals. Matches will be played in Pakansari Stadium, Cibinong and Wibawa Mukti Stadium, Cikarang. It was announced that some fans would be allowed to return to stadiums on a limited basis.

All times are local, WIB (UTC+7).

=== Group X ===
Pos	Team	Pld	W	D	L	GF	GA	GD	Pts	Qualification
1	RANS Cilegon	3	2	1	0	6	4	+2	7	Advance to the semi-finals
2	Persis	3	2	0	1	7	4	+3	6	Advance to the semi-finals
3	Sriwijaya	3	1	1	1	2	3	−1	4	
4	Persiba	3	0	0	3	2	6	−4	0	

Source: Liga 2 2021
Rules for classification: 1) Points; 2) Head-to-head; 3) Goal difference; 4) Goals scored; 5) Drawing.
15 December 2021
18:00

Sriwijaya	2–1	Persiba
Habrian 45'; Rusni 72'	Report	Novrian 4'

Pakansari Stadium, Cibinong
Attendance: 113
Referee: Nusur Fadilah
15 December 2021
20:45

RANS Cilegon	4–3	Persis
Gonzáles 10', 24', 58'; Lastori 12'	Report	Beto 32', 50'; Jauhari 77'

Pakansari Stadium, Cibinong
Attendance: 200
Referee: Abdullah

19 December 2021
18:00

Persiba	1–2	RANS Cilegon
Indra 79'	Report	Tuasalamony 11'; Hamka 61'

Pakansari Stadium, Cibinong
Attendance: 200
Referee: Tabrani
19 December 2021
20:45

Persis	2–0	Sriwijaya
Beto 3' (pen.); Fabiano 88'	Report

Pakansari Stadium, Cibinong
Attendance: 202
Referee: Juhandri Setiana

22 December 2021
21:00

Persis	2–0	Persiba
Sinaga 69', 71'	Report

Pakansari Stadium, Cibinong
Attendance: 199
Referee: Choirudin
22 December 2021
21:00

Sriwijaya	0–0	RANS Cilegon
	Report

Wibawa Mukti Stadium, Cikarang
Attendance: 190
Referee: Ginanjar Rahman Latief

=== Group Y ===
Pos	Team	Pld	W	D	L	GF	GA	GD	Pts	Qualification
1	Dewa United	3	2	1	0	5	2	+3	7	Advance to the semi-finals
2	PSIM	3	1	2	0	3	2	+1	5	Advance to the semi-finals
3	Sulut United	3	1	0	2	2	4	−2	3	
4	PSMS	3	0	1	2	1	3	−2	1	

Source: Liga 2 2021
Rules for classification: 1) Points; 2) Head-to-head; 3) Goal difference; 4) Goals scored; 5) Drawing.
16 December 2021
18:00

PSMS	1–2	Sulut United
Dwipan 88'	Report	Wanggai 45+2'; Mahdi 78'

Wibawa Mukti Stadium, Cikarang
Attendance: 200
Referee: Tabrani
16 December 2021
20:45

Dewa United	2–2	PSIM
Slamet 32'; Rishadi 81'	Report	Hapidin 70'; Sugeng 90+3'

Wibawa Mukti Stadium, Cikarang
Attendance: 190
Referee: Yeni Krisdianto

20 December 2021
18:00

Sulut United	0–2	Dewa United
	Report	Dzumafo 60' (pen.); Rishadi 83'

Wibawa Mukti Stadium, Cikarang
Attendance: 269
Referee: Marjukih
20 December 2021
20:45

PSIM	0–0	PSMS
	Report

Wibawa Mukti Stadium, Cikarang
Attendance: 250
Referee: Asep Yandis

23 December 2021
21:00

PSIM	1–0	Sulut United
Syarif 76'	Report

Wibawa Mukti Stadium, Cikarang
Attendance: 184
Referee: Faulur Rosy
23 December 2021
21:00

PSMS	0–1	Dewa United
	Report	Angga 87'

Pakansari Stadium, Cibinong
Attendance: 195
Referee: Bachrul Ulum

== Knockout round ==
All times are local, WIB (UTC+7).

Semi-finals
27 December – Cibinong
RANS Cilegon	3
PSIM	0
27 December – Cibinong
Dewa United	1
Persis	2

Final
30 December – Cibinong
RANS Cilegon	1
Persis	2
Third place
30 December – Cibinong
PSIM	0
Dewa United	1

=== Semi-finals ===
27 December 2021
17:00

RANS Cilegon	3–0	PSIM
Ragil 41' (pen.); Tuasalamony 65'; Gonzáles 80'	Report

Pakansari Stadium, Cibinong
Attendance: 0
Referee: Thoriq Alkatiri
27 December 2021
21:00

Dewa United	1–2	Persis
Slamet 2'	Report	Beto 10'; Fabiano 28'

Pakansari Stadium, Cibinong
Attendance: 0
Referee: Juhandri Setiana

=== Third place ===
30 December 2021
17:00

PSIM	0–1	Dewa United
	Report	Al Maruf 45'

Pakansari Stadium, Cibinong
Attendance: 0
Referee: Cahya Sugandi

=== Final ===
30 December 2021
21:00

RANS Cilegon	1–2	Persis
Tuasalamony 56' (pen.)	Report	Bachdim 40', 46'

Pakansari Stadium, Cibinong
Attendance: 0 (Note: Played behind closed doors due to the COVID-19 pandemic in Indonesia)
Referee: Yudi Nurcahya

== Top goalscorers ==
Rank	Player	Team	Goals
1	(Indonesia) Alberto Gonçalves	Persis	11
2	(Indonesia) Cristian Gonzáles	RANS Cilegon	7
3	(Indonesia) Slamet Budiyono	Dewa United	6
3	(Indonesia) Rachmad Hidayat	PSMS	6
3	(Indonesia) Dedi Hartono	Sriwijaya	6
6	(Indonesia) Sugeng Efendi	PSIM	5
6	(Indonesia) Agung Supriyanto	PSMS/Persekat	5

== See also ==
- 2021–22 Liga 1
- 2021–22 Liga 3
