= Erwin Gutawa (footballer) =

Indonesian footballer

Personal information
- Full name: Erwin Gutawa
- Date of birth: 6 July 1992 (age 34)
- Place of birth: Bone, Indonesia
- Height: 1.75 m (5 ft 9 in)
- Position: Centre-back

Team information
- Current team: Semen Padang
- Number: 5

Youth career
- Samaenre 90 FC
- Tonra Muda FC

Senior career*
Years	Team	Apps	(Gls)
2014–2018	Martapura	47	(2)
2018–2019	Madura	6	(0)
2019	Martapura	22	(3)
2020	Sriwijaya	0	(0)
2021–2024	PSM Makassar	56	(0)
2024–2025	Bhayangkara	0	(0)
2025–2026	PSMS Medan	15	(0)
2026–	Semen Padang	0	(0)
- * Club domestic league appearances and goals as of 2 May 2026

Erwin Gutawa (born 6 July 1992) is an Indonesian professional footballer who plays for Championship club Semen Padang. Although he mainly plays as a centre-back, he can also play as a right-back.

== Club career ==
=== Martapura ===
He was signed for Martapura to play in Liga 2 in the 2018 season.

=== Madura F.C. ===
On 20 October 2018, Gutawa signed a one-year contract with Liga 2 club Madura on a free transfer.

=== Sriwijaya F.C. ===
He was signed for Sriwijaya to play in Liga 2 in the 2020 season. This season was suspended on 27 March 2020 due to the COVID-19 pandemic. The season was abandoned and was declared void on 20 January 2021.

=== PSM Makassar ===
He was signed for PSM Makassar to play in Liga 1 in the 2021 season. Erwin made his league debut on 5 September by starting in a 1–1 draw against Arema at the Pakansari Stadium, Cibinong.

== Honours ==
PSM Makassar

- Liga 1: 2022–23

Bhayangkara

- Liga 2 runner-up: 2024–25
