= Perserang Serang =

Indonesian football club

- Full name: Persatuan Sepakbola Serang
- Nickname: Laskar Singandaru (Singandaru Warriors)
- Short name: SRG
- Founded: 1958; 68 years ago
- Ground: Maulana Yusuf Stadium
- Capacity: 15,000
- Owner: PT Pilar Perserang Singandaru
- Chairman: Pilar Saga Ichsan
- Manager: Babay Karnawi
- Coach: Bonggo Pribadi
- League: Liga Nusantara
- 2024–25: Liga Nusantara/Relegation Round (Group K), 2nd
Home colours	Away colours	Third colours

Persatuan Sepakbola Serang, commonly known as Perserang, is an Indonesian football club based in Serang Regency, Banten. They play in the Liga Nusantara since they relegated from the Championship (formerly Liga 2) in 2024.

== History ==
They were founded in 1958. In November 2014, they were promoted to the Liga Indonesia Premier Division for the first time in their history after finishing third in Group 11 of the Second National Round of 2014 Liga Nusantara.

== Statistics ==
Note: Since Liga Nusantara established.

=== Recent history ===
Champions	Runners-up	Third place	Promoted	Relegated

Season	Division	Position	Pld	W	D	L	GF	GA	Pts	Cup	AFC competition(s)	
2014	LN	3rd (Note: Group 11 in Second Round.)	6	3	2	1	8	4	11	–	–	–
2015	PD	season not finished									–	–
2016	ISC-B	QF (Note: Overall.)	16	8	6	2	19	11	30	–	–	–
2017	L2	1st (Note: Group G in Relegation play-off.)	17	10	0	7	24	21	30	–	–	–
2018	L2	7th (Note: West Region in First Round.)	22	8	7	7	26	29	31	First round	–	–
2019	L2	6th (Note: West Region in First Round.)	22	10	3	9	24	23	33	–	–	–
2020	L2	season declared void									–	–
2021–22	L2	4th (Note: Group B in First Round.)	10	4	1	5	10	17	13	–	–	–
2022–23	L2	season not finished										
2023–24	L2	3rd (Note: Group A in Relegation Round.)	18	8	1	9	20	20	25	–	–	–
2024–25	LN	2nd (Note: Group K in Relegation Round.)	17	6	4	7	31	25	22	–	–	–
2025–26	LN	6th (Note: Group B)	15	2	6	7	12	18	12	–	–	–

=== Season by season ===
Season	Tier	Division	Place	Piala Indonesia
1998–99	2	FD	3rd (2R: Group A)	–
1999–00	2	FD	5th (1R: Group 2)	–
2001	2	FD	4th	–
2002	2	FD	4th (1R: Group 2)	–
2003	2	FD	6th (1R: Group A)	–
2004	3	SD	4th (1R Group C)	–
2005	3	SD	2nd	First round
2006	2	FD	7th (1R: Group 2)	First round
2007	2	FD	5th (1R: Group 2)	First round

Season	Tier	Division	Place	Piala Indonesia
2008–09	3	FD	Withdrew	–
2009–10	4	SD		–
2010–11	4	SD	3rd (2R: Group D)	–
2011–12	3	FD	4th (1R: Group 4)	–
2013	3	FD	Second round	–
2014	3	FD & LN	3rd (2R: Group 11)	–
2015	2	PD	not finished	–
2016	2	ISC-B	Quarter Final	–
2017	2	L2	1st (Rel-PO: Group G)	–
2018	2	L2	7th (1R: West Region)	First round
2019	2	L2	6th (1R: West Region)	First round
2020	2	L2	declared void	–
2021–22	2	L2	4th (1R: Group B)	–
2022–23	2	L2	not finished	–
2023–24	2	L2	3rd (Rel-RD: Group A)	–
2024–25	3	LN	2nd (Rel-RD: Group K)	–
2025–26	3	LN	6th (Group B)	–

Current league

- 8 seasons in Liga 2
- 2 seasons in Liga Nusantara

Defunct league

- 1 season in ISC B
- 7 season in First Division (as second-tier)
- 4 season in First Division (as third-tier)
- 2 season in Second Division (as third-tier)
- 2 season in Second Division (as fourth-tier)

== Players ==
=== Current squad ===
As of June 2026

Note: Flags indicate national team as defined under FIFA eligibility rules; some limited exceptions apply. Players may hold more than one non-FIFA nationality.

No.	Pos.	Nation	Player
1	GK	IDN	Reza Satria
2	DF	IDN	Abi Bustomi
5	MF	IDN	Hari Habrian
6	FW	IDN	Radaskus Wowa
7	FW	IDN	Arbeta Rockyawan
8	MF	IDN	Didan Paulista
11	FW	IDN	Wondo Sulaeman
13	DF	IDN	Mohammad Rafli
14	MF	IDN	Achmad Afandi
15	DF	IDN	Ikbal Khadafi
16	FW	IDN	Iqbal Priambudi
17	GK	IDN	Muhyi Azis
18	DF	IDN	Raffi Ramadhan

No.	Pos.	Nation	Player
21	DF	IDN	Afiful Huda
22	MF	IDN	Sadek Tuakia
23	FW	IDN	Satrio Bismo
24	DF	IDN	Muhammad Kodofi
25	GK	IDN	Rajendra Ramadhan
26	MF	IDN	Wida Ariadi
27	DF	IDN	Fadel Pattiiha
28	MF	IDN	Gading mahardian
30	DF	IDN	Muhammad Randhika
33	FW	IDN	Indra Saputra
39	MF	IDN	Egi Regiansyah
49	DF	IDN	Imam Mahmudi (captain)
77	GK	IDN	Habbi Ilyasa
96	FW	IDN	Dama Indriyana

== Coaching staff ==
Position	Name
Head coach	(Indonesia) Bonggo Pribadi
Assistant coach	(Indonesia) Yohanes Rastiawan Aribowo
Physical Coach	(Indonesia) Dani Sayidi Syahru
Goalkeeper coach	(Indonesia) Agus Triono

== Stadium ==
Perserang plays their home matches in Maulana Yusuf Stadium.
