= Adhyaksa F.C. Bekasi =

Indonesian football club

Adhyaksa Bekasi
- Full name: Adhyaksa Football Club Bekasi
- Nicknames: Sang Jaksa (The Prosecutors)
- Short name: ADB
- Founded: 2014; 12 years ago, as Putra Ijen; 2018; 8 years ago, as Putra Sinar Giri; 2020; 6 years ago, as PSG Pati; 2021; 5 years ago, as AHHA PS Pati; 2022; 4 years ago, as Bekasi City; 2026; 0 years ago, as Adhyaksa Bekasi
- Ground: Patriot Chandrabaga Stadium
- Capacity: 30,000
- Owner: Public Prosecution Service of Indonesia
- Head coach: Widyantoro
- League: Championship
- 2025–26: 3rd (1st group)
Home colours	Away colours

Adhyaksa Football Club Bekasi, formerly known as Football Club Bekasi City, is an Indonesian professional football club based in Bekasi, West Java that competes in the Championship and plays at Patriot Chandrabaga Stadium.

== History ==
=== East Java origin ===
In 2014, Putra Ijen Football Club was established in Jember Regency. The club was established in order to participate in Liga 3 East Java zone.

=== As Putra Sinar Giri ===
In 2018, Putra Sinar Giri Football Club began participating in the Liga 3 East Java competition after buying a license from the club from Jember Regency, Putra Ijen. The club moved its base from Jember Regency to Gresik Regency. PSG Gresik then promptly joined Liga 3 East Java in 2018.

They won Liga 3 East Java for the first time in their history after beating Perseta Tulungagung 5–3 in penalty shootout.

In 2020, PSG Pati began participating in the Liga 2 after Saiful Arifin bought the club's license from Gresik, Putra Sinar Giri. The club then moved its base to Pati Regency.

=== Ownership change and West Java move ===
==== First season: AHHA PS Pati ====
In 2021, Atta Halilintar and Putra Siregar bought the majority stake of PSG Pati and changed the club's name to AHHA PS Pati. The club then participated in 2021–22 Liga 2 and barely avoided relegation back to the Liga 3.

=== FC Bekasi City ===
In 2022, they decided to move their homebase from Pati to Bekasi and rebranded the club as Bekasi Football Club. For next season, Bekasi FC will use the Patriot Candrabhaga Stadium, hoping that the new homebase can make the club more successful.

However, the name Bekasi FC has been trademarked by a man named Erick, who promptly filed a lawsuit regarding the usage of the Bekasi FC brand. This forced the club to change their name once again into Football Club Bekasi City, which was ratified in the 2022 PSSI Ordinary Congress.

In 2023, Atta Halilintar left the club to focus on futsal, leaving Putra Siregar as the sole owner of the club.

=== Adhyaksa FC Bekasi ===
In the 2026 PSSI Ordinary Congress, Bekasi City officially changed their name to Adhyaksa Bekasi, after Putra Siregar had sold his ownership of the club to the Public Prosecution Service of Indonesia while Bekasi City kept their name as separated entity for their debut season in Indonesia Women's League.

== Name changes ==
- Putra Ijen (2014–2017)
- Putra Sinar Giri (2018–2019)
- PSG Pati (2020–2021)
- AHHA PS Pati (2021)
- FC Bekasi City (2022–2026)
- Adhyaksa Bekasi (2026–present)

== Players ==
=== Current squad ===
As of September 2026

Note: Flags indicate national team as defined under FIFA eligibility rules; some limited exceptions apply. Players may hold more than one non-FIFA nationality.

No.	Pos.	Nation	Player
2	DF	IDN	Muhammad Fariz (on loan from PSS Sleman)
3	DF	BRA	Artur Vieira
4	DF	IDN	Adhe Owen
5	DF	IDN	Rangga Widiansyah
6	DF	IDN	Arif Budiyono
7	FW	IDN	Zahaby Gholy (on loan from Persija Jakarta)
8	MF	IDN	Mirza Zakaria
9	FW	TTO	Rundell Winchester
10	MF	JPN	Tatsuhide Shimizu
11	FW	IDN	Evan Tuhuteru (on loan from Persita Tangerang)
12	DF	IDN	Nazar Nurzaidin
13	DF	IDN	Didik Wahyu
14	DF	IDN	Fabio Azka (on loan from Persija Jakarta)
15	MF	IDN	Algazani Dwi (on loan from Persija Jakarta)
16	MF	IDN	Hapit Ibrahim

No.	Pos.	Nation	Player
17	GK	IDN	Dimas Fani
19	DF	IDN	Muhammad Hamka
20	FW	IDN	Riki Dwi Saputro
21	GK	IDN	Raka Okta
24	GK	IDN	Chairil Zul Azhar
26	FW	IDN	Irkham Mila
27	FW	IDN	Zaid Imam
28	MF	IDN	Rocky Mandosir
29	FW	IDN	Rudiyana
33	MF	IDN	Fairuz Al Abid
36	MF	IDN	Reiva Apriliansyah
64	FW	IDN	Rafly Selang
68	MF	IDN	Amar Fadzillah
72	DF	IDN	Dedi Tri Maulana
77	FW	IDN	Jechson Tiwu
81	GK	IDN	Rendy Razzaqu (on loan from Madura United)
96	DF	IDN	Faqih Maulana
99	MF	IDN	Delvin Rumbino

== Coaching staff ==
Position	Name
Head coach	(Indonesia) Widyantoro
Assistant coach	(Indonesia) Hariyadi Pontoel (Indonesia) Amirul Mukminin
Physical Coach	(Indonesia) Robi Mareiyana
Goalkeeper coach	(Indonesia) Didik Wisnu
Analyst	(Indonesia) Lutfi Zainul

== Season-by-season record ==
=== Putra Sinar Giri ===
Season(s)	League/Division	Teams	Position	Piala Indonesia	AFC competition(s)
2018	Liga 3	32	eliminated in Regional round	–	
2019	Liga 3	32	Third round	–	

=== PSG Pati/AHHA PS Pati ===
Season(s)	League/Division	Teams	Position	Piala Indonesia	AFC competition(s)
2020	Liga 2	24	did not finish	–	
2021–22	Liga 2	24	5th, Group C	–	

=== Bekasi City ===
Season(s)	League/Division	Teams	Position	Piala Indonesia	AFC competition(s)
2022–23	Liga 2	28	did not finish	–	
2023–24	Liga 2	28	4th, Championship round	–	
2024–25	Liga 2	26	2nd, Relegation round	–	
2025–26	Championship	20	3rd, Group 1	–	

=== Adhyaksa Bekasi ===
Season(s)	League/Division	Teams	Position	Piala Indonesia	I-League Cup	AFC competition(s)
2026–27	Championship	20	TBD	–	TBD	–

== Honours ==
- Liga 3 East Java
  - Champions (1): 2019
