= 2022 Piala Presiden final =

- Event: 2022 Piala Presiden
Arema	Borneo Samarinda
1	0
- on aggregate

First leg
Arema	Borneo Samarinda
1	0
- Date: 14 July 2022
- Venue: Kanjuruhan, Malang
- Referee: Fariq Hitaba
- Attendance: 32,153

Second leg
Borneo Samarinda	Arema
0	0
- Date: 17 July 2022
- Venue: Segiri, Samarinda
- Referee: Yudi Nurcahya
- Attendance: 13,621

The 2022 Piala Presiden final was the two-legged final that decided the winner of the 2022 Piala Presiden, the fifth season of Indonesia's pre-season premier club football tournament organised by PSSI.

It was a two-legged match home-and-away format.

The finals was contested between Arema and Borneo Samarinda. The first leg was hosted by Arema at Kanjuruhan in Malang on 14 July, while the second leg was hosted by Borneo Samarinda at Segiri in Samarinda three days later. Two teams were met at finals on 2017 edition when Arema won the cup.

Arema won the finals 1–0 on aggregate for their third overall and second consecutive title.

== Teams ==
Team	Previous finals appearances (bold indicates winners)
Arema	2 (**2017**, **2019**)
Borneo Samarinda	1 (2017)

== Venues ==
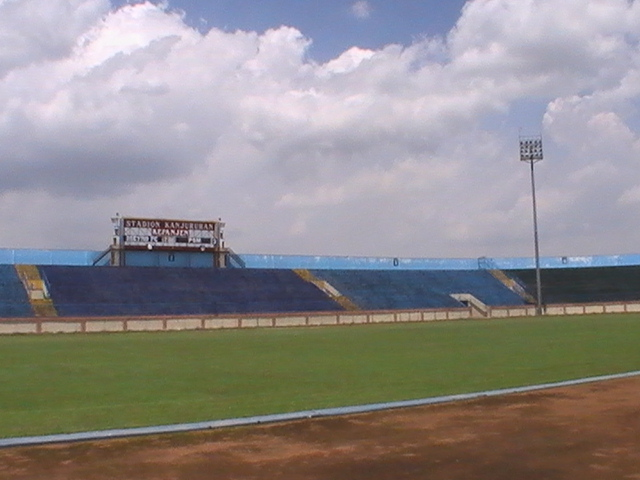
The Kanjuruhan in Malang, hosted the first leg.

== Road to the final ==
Note: In all results below, the score of the finalist is given first (H: home; A: away).

Arema				Round	Borneo Samarinda			
Opponent	Result			Group stage	Opponent	Result		
PSM	0–1 (H)			Matchday 1	Madura United	1–0 (H)		
Persik	1–0 (A)			Matchday 2	Barito Putera	0–0 (H)		
Persikabo 1973	1–0 (A)			Matchday 3	Persija	2–1 (A)		
				Matchday 4	RANS Nusantara	3–0 (H)		
**Group D winners**: Pos / Team / Pld / Pts; **1** / Arema / **3** / **6**; 2 / PSM / 3 / **4**; 3 / Persik / 3 / **4**; 4 / Persikabo 1973 / 3 / **3**; Source: Piala Presiden				Final standings	**Group B winners**: Pos / Team / Pld / Pts; **1** / Borneo Samarinda / **4** / **10**; 2 / Barito Putera / 4 / **6**; 3 / RANS Nusantara / 4 / **5**; 4 / Madura United / 4 / **5**; 5 / Persija / 4 / **0**; Source: Piala Presiden			
Opponent	Agg.	1st leg	2nd leg	Knockout stage	Opponent	Agg.	1st leg	2nd leg
Barito Putera	0–0 (5–4 pen.) (H)			Quarter-finals	PSM	2–1 (H)		
PSIS	4–1	2–0 (A)	2–1 (H)	Semi-finals	PSS	6–0	2–0 (A)	4–0 (H)

== Format ==
The final was played on a home-and-away two-legged basis. The away goals rule would not be applied, and extra time would be played if the aggregate score was tied after the second leg. If the aggregate score was still tied after extra time, a penalty shoot-out would be used to determine the winner.

== Matches ==
All times were local, WIB (UTC+7).

=== First leg ===
14 July 2022
20:00

Arema	1–0	Borneo Samarinda
Camará 15'	Report

Kanjuruhan Stadium, Malang
Attendance: 32,153
Referee: Fariq Hitaba

**Arema**	**Borneo Samarinda**

GK	90	(Brazil) Adilson Maringá
RB	12	(Indonesia) Rizky Dwi
CB	4	(Portugal) Sérgio Silva
CB	5	(Indonesia) Bagas Adi
LB	87	(Indonesia) Johan Alfarizi (c)
CDM	14	(Indonesia) Jayus Hariono	(substituted off) 46'
CDM	8	(Japan) Renshi Yamaguchi
CAM	11	(Indonesia) Gian Zola	(substituted off) 86'
RW	41	(Indonesia) Dendi Santoso	(substituted off) 77'
LW	18	(Indonesia) Adam Alis	(substituted off) 60'
CF	29	(Guinea-Bissau) Abel Camará
Substitutes:
GK	23	(Indonesia) Teguh Amiruddin
DF	37	(Indonesia) Ikhfanul Alam
DF	24	(Indonesia) Rendika Rama
DF	26	(Indonesia) Achmad Figo
MF	30	(Indonesia) Ilham Armaiyn	(substituted on) 77'
MF	88	(Indonesia) Irsyad Maulana	(substituted on) 60'
FW	10	(Indonesia) Muhammad Rafli	(substituted on) 46'
FW	13	(Indonesia) Hamzah Titofani
FW	22	(Indonesia) Hanis Sagara	(substituted on) 86'
FW	27	(Indonesia) Dedik Setiawan
Head Coach:
(Portugal) Eduardo Almeida

Starting XI

GK	1	(Indonesia) Angga Saputro
RB	56	(Indonesia) Fajar Fathur	(substituted off) 86'
CB	24	(Indonesia) Diego Michiels (c)
CB	19	(Uzbekistan) Javlon Guseynov	(substituted off) 86'
LB	15	(Indonesia) Leo Guntara
CDM	12	(Indonesia) Hendro Siswanto
CM	8	(Japan) Kei Hirose
CM	66	(Indonesia) Misbakus Solikin	(substituted off) 59'
RW	28	(Indonesia) Terens Puhiri	(substituted off) 81'
LW	14	(Indonesia) Stefano Lilipaly
CF	7	(Brazil) Matheus Pato
Substitutes:
GK	88	(Indonesia) Shahar Ginanjar
DF	44	(Indonesia) Nur Diansyah
DF	13	(Indonesia) Agung Prasetyo	(substituted on) 86'
DF	4	(Indonesia) Wildansyah
DF	74	(Indonesia) Rifad Marasabessy	(substituted on) 86'
MF	33	(Indonesia) Wahyudi Hamisi
MF	90	(Indonesia) Muhammad Sihran	(substituted on) 59'
FW	27	(Indonesia) Andy Harjito
FW	23	(Indonesia) Arya Gerryan	(substituted on) 81'
FW	9	(Indonesia) Ahmad Hardianto
Head Coach:
(Bosnia and Herzegovina) Milomir Šešlija

Man of the Match:

Assistant referees:
Beni Andriko
Asri
Fourth official:
Harry Cristanta
Additional assistant referee:
Moch Adung
Sigit Budiyanto

**Match rules**

- 90 minutes.
- Ten named substitutes, of which up to six may be used. (Note: Each team was given only three opportunities to make substitutions, excluding substitutions made at half-time.)

=== Second leg ===
17 July 2022
20:00

Borneo Samarinda	0–0	Arema
	Report

Segiri Stadium, Samarinda
Attendance: 13,621
Referee: Yudi Nurcahya

**Borneo Samarinda**	**Arema**

GK	1	(Indonesia) Angga Saputro
RB	24	(Indonesia) Diego Michiels (c)		(substituted off) 66'
CB	13	(Indonesia) Agung Prasetyo
CB	19	(Uzbekistan) Javlon Guseynov
LB	15	(Indonesia) Leo Guntara	(yellow card) 66'	(substituted off) 88'
CDM	12	(Indonesia) Hendro Siswanto
CM	8	(Japan) Kei Hirose
CM	18	(Argentina) Jonathan Bustos	(yellow card) 44'	(substituted off) 72'
RW	28	(Indonesia) Terens Puhiri		(substituted off) 72'
LW	14	(Indonesia) Stefano Lilipaly
CF	7	(Brazil) Matheus Pato
Substitutes:
GK	88	(Indonesia) Shahar Ginanjar
DF	44	(Indonesia) Nur Diansyah
DF	4	(Indonesia) Wildansyah
DF	97	(Indonesia) Irsan Lestaluhu
MF	33	(Indonesia) Wahyudi Hamisi
MF	56	(Indonesia) Fajar Fathur		(substituted on) 66'
MF	66	(Indonesia) Misbakus Solikin
MF	90	(Indonesia) Muhammad Sihran		(substituted on) 72'
FW	27	(Indonesia) Andy Harjito	(yellow card) 90'	(substituted on) 88'
FW	9	(Indonesia) Ahmad Hardianto		(substituted on) 72'
Head Coach:
(Bosnia and Herzegovina) Milomir Šešlija

Starting XI

GK	90	(Brazil) Adilson Maringá
RB	12	(Indonesia) Rizky Dwi
CB	4	(Portugal) Sérgio Silva
CB	5	(Indonesia) Bagas Adi
LB	87	(Indonesia) Johan Alfarizi (c)	(yellow card) 81'
CDM	14	(Indonesia) Jayus Hariono		(substituted off) 46'
CDM	8	(Japan) Renshi Yamaguchi	(yellow card) 10'
CAM	11	(Indonesia) Gian Zola		(substituted off) 46'
RW	41	(Indonesia) Dendi Santoso	(yellow card) 45+1'	(substituted off) 80'
LW	18	(Indonesia) Adam Alis	(yellow card) 33'	(substituted off) 46'
CF	29	(Guinea-Bissau) Abel Camará
Substitutes:
GK	23	(Indonesia) Teguh Amiruddin
DF	24	(Indonesia) Rendika Rama
DF	26	(Indonesia) Achmad Figo
MF	6	(Indonesia) Evan Dimas		(substituted on) 46'
MF	30	(Indonesia) Ilham Armaiyn		(substituted on) 80'
MF	88	(Indonesia) Irsyad Maulana		(substituted on) 46'
FW	10	(Indonesia) Muhammad Rafli	(yellow card) 84'	(substituted on) 46'	(substituted off) 90'
FW	13	(Indonesia) Hamzah Titofani
FW	22	(Indonesia) Hanis Sagara		(substituted on) 90'
FW	27	(Indonesia) Dedik Setiawan
Head Coach:
(Portugal) Eduardo Almeida

Man of the Match:

Assistant referees:
Bambang Syamsudar
Azizul Alimmudin Hanafiah
Fourth official:
Rusdi Muksin
Additional assistant referee:
Aprisman Aranda
Faulur Rosy

**Match rules**

- 90 minutes.
- 30 minutes of extra time if tied on aggregate and without away goals rule.
- Penalty shoot-out if still tied after extra time.
- Ten named substitutes, of which up to six may be used, with a seventh allowed in extra time. (Note: Each team was given only three opportunities to make substitutions, with a fourth opportunity in extra time, excluding substitutions made at half-time, before the start of extra time and at half-time in extra time.)
