= 2018 Borneo F.C. season =

Borneo
2018 season
- Owner: PT. Nahusam Pratama Indonesia
- Chairman: Nabil Husein Said Amin
- Head coach: Dejan Antonić
- Stadium: Segiri Stadium
- Liga 1: 9th
- Piala Indonesia: Second round
- President's Cup: Group stage
Home colours	Away colours	Third colours

The 2018 season of Borneo Football Club.

== Players ==
=== Current squad ===
As of 1 August 2018

Note: Flags indicate national team as defined under FIFA eligibility rules; some limited exceptions apply. Players may hold more than one non-FIFA nationality.

No.	Pos.	Nation	Player
1	GK	(Indonesia) IDN	Nadeo Argawinata
4	DF	(Indonesia) IDN	Wildansyah (on loan from Persib)
7	DF	(Kyrgyzstan) KGZ	Azamat Baymatov
9	FW	(Argentina) ARG	Matías Conti
11	FW	(Indonesia) IDN	Titus Bonai
12	FW	(Indonesia) IDN	Lerby Eliandry
13	FW	(Indonesia) IDN	Aulia Hidayat
14	MF	(Indonesia) IDN	Ambrizal Umanailo
15	MF	(Indonesia) IDN	Mahadirga Lasut
17	DF	(Indonesia) IDN	Abdul Rachman
19	FW	(Indonesia) IDN	Amien Rais Ohorella
20	GK	(Indonesia) IDN	Muhammad Ridho
21	MF	(Indonesia) IDN	Billy Keraf (on loan from Persib)

No.	Pos.	Nation	Player
22	MF	(Indonesia) IDN	Sultan Samma
24	DF	(Indonesia) IDN	Diego Michiels (Captain)
25	FW	(Indonesia) IDN	Febri Hamzah
27	DF	(Indonesia) IDN	Firdaus Ramadhan
30	DF	(Indonesia) IDN	Ahmad Maulana
31	GK	(Indonesia) IDN	Gianluca Pandeynuwu
32	DF	(Indonesia) IDN	Leonard Tupamahu
33	MF	(Indonesia) IDN	Wahyudi Hamisi
36	DF	(Indonesia) IDN	Eddy Gunawan
44	MF	(Indonesia) IDN	Achmad Hisyam
63	DF	(Brazil) BRA	Renan Alves
75	MF	(Tunisia) TUN	Tijani Belaid
77	MF	(Indonesia) IDN	Muhammad Sihran
98	MF	(Indonesia) IDN	Habibi

=== Out on loan ===
Note: Flags indicate national team as defined under FIFA eligibility rules; some limited exceptions apply. Players may hold more than one non-FIFA nationality.

No.	Pos.	Nation	Player
28	MF	(Indonesia) IDN	Terens Puhiri (at Port until 31 December 2018)
–	DF	(Indonesia) IDN	Yericho Christiantoko (at PSS until 31 December 2018)
–	MF	(Indonesia) IDN	Rifal Lastori (at PSS until 31 December 2018)
8	MF	(Indonesia) IDN	Dody Alfayed (at Persis Solo until 31 December 2018)
–	DF	(Indonesia) IDN	Tedi Berlian (at Persibat until 31 December 2018)

No.	Pos.	Nation	Player
–	DF	(Indonesia) IDN	Bursanuddin Ahya (at Madura until 31 December 2018)
–	DF	(Indonesia) IDN	Nurdiansyah (at Persika until 31 December 2018)
–	MF	(Indonesia) IDN	Zulvin Zamrun (at Kalteng until 31 December 2018)
78	MF	(Indonesia) IDN	Riswan Yusman (at Persibat until 31 December 2018)
