= 2022 Piala Presiden (Indonesia) =

Indonesia President's Cup

Tournament details
- Country: Indonesia
- Dates: 11 June – 17 July 2022
- Teams: 18

Final positions
- Champions: Arema (3rd title)
- Runners-up: Borneo Samarinda
- Semifinalists: PSIS; PSS

Tournament statistics
- Matches played: 42
- Goals scored: 89 (2.12 per match)
- Attendance: 413,607 (9,848 per match)
- Top goal scorer(s): Matheus Pato (6 goals)

Awards
- Best player: Adilson Maringá
- Goals scored in penalty shoot-outs are not included.

The 2022 Piala Presiden (English: 2022 Indonesia President's Cup) was the fifth edition of Piala Presiden. It was held by the Football Association of Indonesia (PSSI) as a pre-season tournament for the 2022–23 Liga 1. The tournament started on 11 June and finished on 17 July 2022.

Arema were the defending champions after winning the title in 2019, and they beat Borneo Samarinda 1–0 on aggregate in the finals for their third title in the tournament.

== Teams ==
The following 18 teams (18 from Liga 1) participated for the tournament.

Team	Appearance	Last appearance	Previous best performance	2021–22 season league ranking
Arema	5th	2019	Winners (2017, 2019)	4th in Liga 1
Bali United	5th	2019	Runners-up (2018)	1st in Liga 1
Barito Putera	4th	2019	Group stage (2017, 2018, 2019)	15th in Liga 1
Bhayangkara	5th	2019	Quarter-finals (2015, (Note: As Persebaya United) 2017, 2019)	3rd in Liga 1
Borneo Samarinda	5th	2019	Runners-up (2017)	6th in Liga 1
Dewa United	3rd	2018	Group stage (2015, (Note: As Martapura) 2018)	3rd in Liga 2
Madura United	5th	2019	Semi-finals (2019)	9th in Liga 1
Persebaya	3rd	2019	Runners-up (2019)	5th in Liga 1
Persib	5th	2019	Winners (2015)	2nd in Liga 1
Persija	5th	2019	Winners (2018)	8th in Liga 1
Persik	1st	N/A	Debut	11th in Liga 1
Persikabo 1973	4th	2019	Quarter-finals (2019)	10th in Liga 1
Persis	1st	N/A	Debut	1st in Liga 2
Persita	3rd	2019	Group stage (2015, 2019)	12th in Liga 1
PSIS	3rd	2019	Group stage (2018, 2019)	7th in Liga 1
PSM	5th	2019	Quarter-finals (2015)	14th in Liga 1
PSS	3rd	2019	Group stage (2017, 2019)	13th in Liga 1
RANS Nusantara	1st	N/A	Debut	2nd in Liga 2

== Venues ==
Manahan, Segiri, Gelora Bandung Lautan Api, Jalak Harupat, and Kanjuruhan were used for group stage match. Jalak Harupat was appointed due to an incident at Gelora Bandung Lautan Api. Jalak Harupat, Maguwoharjo, Segiri, Jatidiri, and Kanjuruhan were used for knockout stage as the team reached the stage.

Solo	Samarinda	Bandung	Bandung Regency	Malang	Semarang	Sleman
Manahan	Segiri	Gelora Bandung Lautan Api	Jalak Harupat	Kanjuruhan	Jatidiri	Maguwoharjo
Capacity: 20,000	Capacity: 16,000	Capacity: 38,000	Capacity: 27,000	Capacity: 42,449	Capacity: 31,700	Capacity: 25,000
2022 Piala Presiden (Indonesia) is located in Indonesia

== Draw ==
The draw of the tournament was held on 29 May 2022. The draw resulted in the following groups:

Group A
Pos	Team
A1	Persis (Host)
A2	PSIS
A3	Dewa United
A4	Persita
A5	PSS

Group B
Pos	Team
B1	Borneo Samarinda (Host)
B2	Barito Putera
B3	Persija
B4	RANS Nusantara
B5	Madura United

Group C
Pos	Team
C1	Persib (Host)
C2	Bhayangkara
C3	Bali United
C4	Persebaya

Group D
Pos	Team
D1	Arema (Host)
D2	Persikabo 1973
D3	PSM
D4	Persik

== Format ==
In this tournament, 18 teams were drawn into four groups each consisting of five teams from groups A and B, four teams from groups C and D. Quarter-final matches were held once at each group winner's home stadium. Semi-final and final rounds were held home and away. Away goals rule was not applied. Extra time and penalty shootout were used to break the tie.

== Group stage ==
The top two teams of each group advanced to the quarter-finals.

All times were local, WIB (UTC+7).

=== Group A ===
Pos	Team	Pld	W	D	L	GF	GA	GD	Pts	Qualification
1	PSIS	4	3	1	0	15	6	+9	10	Knockout stage
2	PSS	4	2	1	1	5	5	0	7	Knockout stage
3	Persita	4	2	0	2	4	9	−5	6	
4	Dewa United	4	0	2	2	4	6	−2	2	
5	Persis (H)	4	0	2	2	2	4	−2	2	

Source: Piala Presiden
Rules for classification: 1) Points; 2) Head-to-head; 3) Goal difference; 4) Goals scored; 5) Fair-play points; 6) Draw.
(H) Hosts
11 June 2022
16:00

Persis	0–0	PSS
	Report

Manahan Stadium, Solo
Attendance: 15,819
Referee: Yudi Nurcahya
13 June 2022
16:00

PSIS	6–1	Persita
Oktafianus 16'; Fortes 36', 79'; Marukawa 41'; Hari Nur 52'; Rachmad 89'	Report	Fergonzi 55' (pen.)

Manahan Stadium, Solo
Attendance: 2,055
Referee: Darma Santoso Gulo

16 June 2022
16:00

Persita	0–2	PSS
	Report	Fandi Eko 45+1'; Riki Dwi 90+8'

Manahan Stadium, Solo
Attendance: 10,856
Referee: Iwan Sukoco
17 June 2022
16:00

Dewa United	2–2	PSIS
Rangga 2'; Rossi 86'	Report	Eka Febri 10'; Wahyu 90+5'

Manahan Stadium, Solo
Attendance: 2,036
Referee: Sigit Budiyanto

20 June 2022
16:00

Persita	2–1	Dewa United
Fergonzi 44'; Abu Rizal 46'	Report	Rossi 45+3'

Manahan Stadium, Solo
Attendance: 61
Referee: Annas Apriliandi
21 June 2022
16:00

Persis	1–2	PSIS
Fabiano 45+4'	Report	Dewangga 36'; Fortes 69'

Manahan Stadium, Solo
Attendance: 18,053
Referee: Tabrani

24 June 2022
16:00

Dewa United	1–1	Persis
Miftah 70'	Report	Fabiano 8'

Manahan Stadium, Solo
Attendance: 5,413
Referee: Yudi Nurcahya
24 June 2022
20:30

PSIS	5–2	PSS
Cantillana 7', 24'; Fortes 45+1' (pen.), 62'; Hari Nur 90+2'	Report	Riki Dwi 40'; Rifky 88'

Manahan Stadium, Solo
Attendance: 8,990
Referee: Totok Fitrianto

27 June 2022
16:00

PSS	1–0	Dewa United
Zé Valente 71'	Report

Manahan Stadium, Solo
Attendance: 13,886
Referee: M. Erfan Efendi
27 June 2022
20:30

Persis	0–1	Persita
	Report	Elisa 45'

Manahan Stadium, Solo
Attendance: 11,689
Referee: Pipin Indra Pratama

=== Group B ===
Pos	Team	Pld	W	D	L	GF	GA	GD	Pts	Qualification
1	Borneo Samarinda (H)	4	3	1	0	6	1	+5	10	Knockout stage
2	Barito Putera	4	1	3	0	4	2	+2	6	Knockout stage
3	RANS Nusantara	4	1	2	1	6	5	+1	5	
4	Madura United	4	1	2	1	3	3	0	5	
5	Persija	4	0	0	4	3	11	−8	0	

Source: Piala Presiden
Rules for classification: 1) Points; 2) Head-to-head; 3) Goal difference; 4) Goals scored; 5) Fair-play points; 6) Draw.
(H) Hosts
14 June 2022
16:00

Barito Putera	1–1	RANS Nusantara
Rafael 2' (pen.)	Report	Bagaskara 39'

Segiri Stadium, Samarinda
Attendance: 6,000
Referee: Steven Yubel Poli
14 June 2022
20:30

Borneo Samarinda	1–0	Madura United
Bustos 70' (pen.)	Report

Segiri Stadium, Samarinda
Attendance: 9,180
Referee: Agus Fauzan Arifin

18 June 2022
16:00

RANS Nusantara	0–0	Madura United
	Report

Segiri Stadium, Samarinda
Attendance: 2,553
Referee: Oki Dwi Putra
18 June 2022
20:30

Persija	0–2	Barito Putera
	Report	Noma 70'; Rafael 89'

Segiri Stadium, Samarinda
Attendance: 2,553
Referee: Yeni Krisdianto

22 June 2022
16:00

Borneo Samarinda	0–0	Barito Putera
	Report

Segiri Stadium, Samarinda
Attendance: 4,562
Referee: Ruli
22 June 2022
20:30

RANS Nusantara	5–1	Persija
Bagaskara 15'; Edo 44'; Kodai 57'; Laly 69'; Gonzáles 85' (pen.)	Report	Miyazaki 89'

Segiri Stadium, Samarinda
Attendance: 1,446
Referee: Gideon Fernando Dapaherang

25 June 2022
16:00

Barito Putera	1–1	Madura United
Rafael 45' (pen.)	Report	Al-Jaberi 38'

Segiri Stadium, Samarinda
Attendance: 1,425
Referee: Musthofa Umarella
25 June 2022
20:30

Persija	1–2	Borneo Samarinda
Rio Fahmi 22'	Report	Lilipaly 45+3'; Pato 73'

Segiri Stadium, Samarinda
Attendance: 7,225
Referee: Yeni Krisdianto

28 June 2022
16:00

Borneo Samarinda	3–0	RANS Nusantara
Pato 51'; Lilipaly 65' (pen.), 87'	Report

Segiri Stadium, Samarinda
Attendance: 6,470
Referee: Oki Dwi Putra
28 June 2022
20:30

Madura United	2–1	Persija
Beto 45+3'; Cleberson 79'	Report	Frengky 89'

Segiri Stadium, Samarinda
Attendance: 1,236
Referee: Agus Fauzan Arifin

=== Group C ===
Pos	Team	Pld	W	D	L	GF	GA	GD	Pts	Qualification
1	Persib (H)	3	2	1	0	5	2	+3	7	Knockout stage
2	Bhayangkara	3	1	1	1	3	3	0	4 (Note: Head-to-head points: Bhayangkara 3, Bali United 0.)	Knockout stage
3	Bali United	3	1	1	1	3	3	0	4	
4	Persebaya	3	0	1	2	2	5	−3	1	

Source: Piala Presiden
Rules for classification: 1) Points; 2) Head-to-head; 3) Goal difference; 4) Goals scored; 5) Fair-play points; 6) Draw.
(H) Hosts
Notes:
12 June 2022
20:30

Persib	1–1	Bali United
da Silva 80'	Report	Novri 3'

Gelora Bandung Lautan Api Stadium, Bandung
Attendance: 15,652
Referee: Fariq Hitaba
13 June 2022
20:30

Bhayangkara	1–1	Persebaya
Anderson 90+5'	Report	Nufiandani 64'

Gelora Bandung Lautan Api Stadium, Bandung
Attendance: 394
Referee: Abdullah

16 June 2022
20:30

Bali United	1–2	Bhayangkara
Novri 36'	Report	Anderson 8'; Sani 88'

Gelora Bandung Lautan Api Stadium, Bandung
Attendance: 473
Referee: Hamim Thohari
17 June 2022
20:30

Persebaya	1–3	Persib
Lelis 17' (pen.)	Report	Igbonefo 25'; Kuipers 35'; Ciro 90+3'

Gelora Bandung Lautan Api Stadium, Bandung
Attendance: 37,872
Referee: Armyn Dwi Suryathin

20 June 2022
20:30

Bali United	1–0	Persebaya
Ramdani 52'	Report

Jalak Harupat Stadium, Bandung Regency
Attendance: 0
Referee: Aprisman Aranda
21 June 2022
20:30

Bhayangkara	0–1	Persib
	Report	da Silva 35'

Jalak Harupat Stadium, Bandung Regency
Attendance: 0
Referee: Dwi Purba

=== Group D ===
Pos	Team	Pld	W	D	L	GF	GA	GD	Pts	Qualification
1	Arema (H)	3	2	0	1	2	1	+1	6	Knockout stage
2	PSM	3	1	1	1	1	1	0	4 (Note: Fair play points: PSM −5, Persik −12.)	Knockout stage
3	Persik	3	1	1	1	1	1	0	4	
4	Persikabo 1973	3	1	0	2	1	2	−1	3	

Source: Piala Presiden
Rules for classification: 1) Points; 2) Head-to-head; 3) Goal difference; 4) Goals scored; 5) Fair-play points; 6) Draw.
(H) Hosts
Notes:
11 June 2022
20:30

Arema	0–1	PSM
	Report	Pluim 1'

Kanjuruhan Stadium, Malang
Attendance: 18,724
Referee: Nusur Fadilah
12 June 2022
16:00

Persikabo 1973	0–1	Persik
	Report	Joanderson 49'

Kanjuruhan Stadium, Malang
Attendance: 202
Referee: Sance Lawita

15 June 2022
16:00

PSM	0–1	Persikabo 1973
	Report	Ryan 90+3' (pen.)

Kanjuruhan Stadium, Malang
Attendance: 206
Referee: Mansyur
15 June 2022
20:30

Persik	0–1	Arema
	Report	Irsyad 90+1' (pen.)

Kanjuruhan Stadium, Malang
Attendance: 16,641
Referee: Ginanjar Rahman Latief

19 June 2022
16:00

PSM	0–0	Persik
	Report

Kanjuruhan Stadium, Malang
Attendance: 357
Referee: Asep Yandis
19 June 2022
20:30

Persikabo 1973	0–1	Arema
	Report	Zola 9'

Kanjuruhan Stadium, Malang
Attendance: 18,155
Referee: Adi Riyanto

== Knockout stage ==
In the quarter-finals, extra time would not be played, and a match would go straight to a penalty shoot-out to determine the winner. In the semi-finals and finals, the away goals rule would not be applied, and a match would go to extra time and a penalty shoot-out if necessary.

All times were local, WIB (UTC+7).

=== Bracket ===
Quarter-finals
3 July – Semarang
PSIS (p)	1 (9)
Bhayangkara	1 (8)
2 July – Malang
Arema (p)	0 (5)
Barito Putera	0 (4)
1 July – Bandung Regency
Persib	1 (2)
PSS (p)	1 (4)
3 July – Samarinda
Borneo Samarinda	2
PSM	1

Semi-finals
7/11 July
PSIS	0	1	1
Arema	2	2	4
7/11 July
PSS	0	0	0
Borneo Samarinda	2	4	6

Finals
14/17 July
Arema	1	0	1
Borneo Samarinda	0	0	0

=== Quarter-finals ===
1 July 2022
20:30

Persib	1–1	PSS
Klok 85' (pen.)	Report	Boaz 53'
Penalties
Klok (penalty scored); Erwin (penalty missed); Irianto (penalty scored); Jufriyanto (penalty missed)	2–4	(penalty scored) Zé Valente; (penalty scored) Nirwanto; (penalty scored) Hambali Tolib; (penalty scored) Rifky

Jalak Harupat Stadium, Bandung Regency
Attendance: 0
Referee: Yeni Krisdianto

2 July 2022
15:30

Arema	0–0	Barito Putera
	Report
Penalties
Rafli (penalty scored); Bagas (penalty scored); Adam Alis (penalty scored); Evan (penalty missed); Camará (penalty scored); Jayus (penalty scored)	5–4	(penalty scored) Rafael; (penalty missed) Renan; (penalty scored) Pora; (penalty scored) Luthfi; (penalty scored) Pradana; (penalty missed) Dedi

Kanjuruhan Stadium, Malang
Attendance: 14,675
Referee: Totok Fitrianto

3 July 2022
15:30

PSIS	1–1	Bhayangkara
Wawan 45+2'	Report	Ezzejjari 58'
Penalties
Fortes (penalty scored); Cantillana (penalty missed); Fredyan (penalty scored); Sesay (penalty scored); Marukawa (penalty scored); Oktafianus (penalty scored); Frendi (penalty scored); Dewangga (penalty scored); Wahyu (penalty scored); Hari Nur (penalty scored)	9–8	(penalty missed) Anderson; (penalty scored) Hargianto; (penalty scored) Sani; (penalty scored) Ezzejjari; (penalty scored) Dendy; (penalty scored) Ruben; (penalty scored) Finky; (penalty scored) Kasim; (penalty scored) Asyraq; (penalty missed) Putu Gede

Jatidiri Stadium, Semarang
Attendance: 15,674
Referee: Faulur Rosy

3 July 2022
20:30

Borneo Samarinda	2–1	PSM
Agung 6'; Pato 18'	Report	Pluim 76'

Segiri Stadium, Samarinda
Attendance: 12,556
Referee: Thoriq Alkatiri

=== Semi-finals ===
7 July 2022
16:00

PSIS	0–2	Arema
	Report	Camará 78'; Zola 89'

Jatidiri Stadium, Semarang
Attendance: 14,743
Referee: Oki Dwi Putra
11 July 2022
15:30

Arema	2–1	PSIS
Rizky 31'; Rafli 75'	Report	Cantillana 87'

Kanjuruhan Stadium, Malang
Attendance: 29,844
Referee: Steven Yubel Poli

Arema won 4–1 on aggregate.

7 July 2022
20:30

PSS	0–2	Borneo Samarinda
	Report	Pato 19', 45+4'

Maguwoharjo Stadium, Sleman
Attendance: 27,876
Referee: Sance Lawita
11 July 2022
20:30

Borneo Samarinda	4–0	PSS
Pato 16'; Lilipaly 45+2'; Sihran 54'; Diego 66'	Report

Segiri Stadium, Samarinda
Attendance: 12,281
Referee: Ruli

Borneo Samarinda won 6–0 on aggregate.

=== Finals ===
14 July 2022
20:00

Arema	1–0	Borneo Samarinda
Camará 15'	Report

Kanjuruhan Stadium, Malang
Attendance: 32,153
Referee: Fariq Hitaba
17 July 2022
20:00

Borneo Samarinda	0–0	Arema
	Report

Segiri Stadium, Samarinda
Attendance: 13,621
Referee: Yudi Nurcahya

Arema won 1–0 on aggregate.

== Statistics ==
=== Goalscorers ===
There were 89 goals scored in 42 matches, for an average of 2.12 goals per match.

6 goals

- (Brazil) Matheus Pato

5 goals

- (Portugal) Carlos Fortes

4 goals

- (Indonesia) Stefano Lilipaly

3 goals

- (Brazil) Rafael Silva
- (Palestine) Jonathan Cantillana

2 goals

- (Argentina) Ramiro Fergonzi
- (Brazil) Anderson Salles
- (Brazil) David da Silva
- (Guinea-Bissau) Abel Camará
- (Indonesia) Fabiano Beltrame
- (Indonesia) Gian Zola
- (Indonesia) Hari Nur Yulianto
- (Indonesia) Novri Setiawan
- (Indonesia) Riki Dwi Saputro
- (Indonesia) Septian Bagaskara
- (Netherlands) Wiljan Pluim
- (Switzerland) Karim Rossi

1 goal

- (Argentina) Jonathan Bustos
- (Brazil) Ciro
- (Brazil) Cleberson
- (Brazil) Joanderson
- (Brazil) Léo Lelis
- (Indonesia) Abu Rizal Maulana
- (Indonesia) Agung Prasetyo
- (Indonesia) Ahmad Nufiandani
- (Indonesia) Alfeandra Dewangga
- (Indonesia) Beto Gonçalves
- (Indonesia) Boaz Solossa
- (Indonesia) Cristian Gonzáles
- (Indonesia) David Laly
- (Indonesia) Diego Michiels
- (Indonesia) Edo Febriansah
- (Indonesia) Eka Febri Setiawan
- (Indonesia) Elisa Basna
- (Indonesia) Fandi Eko Utomo
- (Indonesia) Frengky Missa
- (Indonesia) Rio Fahmi
- (Indonesia) Irsyad Maulana
- (Indonesia) Marc Klok
- (Indonesia) Miftah Anwar Sani
- (Indonesia) Muhammad Rafli
- (Indonesia) Muhammad Sihran
- (Indonesia) Oktafianus Fernando
- (Indonesia) Rachmad Hidayat
- (Indonesia) Ramdani Lestaluhu
- (Indonesia) Rangga Muslim
- (Indonesia) Rifky Suryawan
- (Indonesia) Rizky Dwi Febrianto
- (Indonesia) Ryan Kurnia
- (Indonesia) Sani Rizki Fauzi
- (Indonesia) Victor Igbonefo
- (Indonesia) Wahyu Prasetyo
- (Indonesia) Wawan Febrianto
- (Iraq) Selwan Al-Jaberi
- (Japan) Kodai Iida
- (Japan) Ryohei Miyazaki
- (Japan) Ryota Noma
- (Japan) Taisei Marukawa
- (Netherlands) Nick Kuipers
- (Portugal) Zé Valente
- (Spain) Youssef Ezzejjari

=== Awards ===
- Fair play team was awarded to Borneo Samarinda.
- Top scorer was awarded to Matheus Pato (Borneo Samarinda) with six goals.
- Best young player was awarded to Fajar Fathur (Borneo Samarinda).
- Best player was awarded to Adilson Maringá (Arema).

=== Tournament team rankings ===
As per statistical convention in football, matches decided in extra time were counted as wins and losses, while matches decided by penalty shoot-outs were counted as draws.

Pos	Grp	Team	Pld	W	D	L	GF	GA	GD	Pts	Final result
1	D	Arema	8	5	2	1	7	2	+5	17	Champion
2	B	Borneo Samarinda	9	6	2	1	14	3	+11	20	Runner-up
3	A	PSIS	7	3	2	2	17	11	+6	11	Eliminated in the semi-finals
4	A	PSS	7	2	2	3	6	12	−6	8	Eliminated in the semi-finals
5	C	Persib	4	2	2	0	6	3	+3	8	Eliminated in the quarter-finals
6	B	Barito Putera	5	1	4	0	4	2	+2	7	Eliminated in the quarter-finals
7	C	Bhayangkara	4	1	2	1	4	4	0	5	Eliminated in the quarter-finals
8	D	PSM	4	1	1	2	2	3	−1	4	Eliminated in the quarter-finals
9	A	Persita	4	2	0	2	4	9	−5	6	Eliminated in the group stage
10	B	RANS Nusantara	4	1	2	1	6	5	+1	5	Eliminated in the group stage
11	B	Madura United	4	1	2	1	3	3	0	5	Eliminated in the group stage
12	C	Bali United	3	1	1	1	3	3	0	4	Eliminated in the group stage
13	D	Persik	3	1	1	1	1	1	0	4	Eliminated in the group stage
14	D	Persikabo 1973	3	1	0	2	1	2	−1	3	Eliminated in the group stage
15	A	Dewa United	4	0	2	2	4	6	−2	2	Eliminated in the group stage
16	A	Persis	4	0	2	2	2	4	−2	2	Eliminated in the group stage
17	C	Persebaya	3	0	1	2	2	5	−3	1	Eliminated in the group stage
18	B	Persija	4	0	0	4	3	11	−8	0	Eliminated in the group stage

Source: Group stage, Knockout stage

== Controversies ==
=== Gelora Bandung Lautan Api Stadium crowd incident ===
On the group C match between Persib Bandung (host) and Persebaya Surabaya, which took place on 17 June 2022 at Gelora Bandung Lautan Api Stadium, Bandung, an uncontrolled mass that was forced to enter the stage caused at least two people to be killed. The stadium arena was reported to be in poor condition with eight entrances vandalized, trash strewn and items abandoned. In response to the event, the Football Association of Indonesia (PSS!) via their website, released that they would investigate the incident. Disciplinary committee of PSSI imposed Persib a fine of IDR 50 Million and a ban on playing at the Gelora Bandung Lautan Api Stadium for the remainder of the tournament.

=== Agung Prasetyo "kungfu kick" ===
Yudi Nurcahya was a FIFA licensed referee and led the second leg of the finals between Borneo Samarinda and Arema at Segiri Stadium, Samarinda. At the 33rd minute of the match, Arema player Gian Zola's head was struck by Borneo Samarinda player Agung Prasetyo's "kungfu kick" when Zola was about to head the ball in the air, potentially injuring Zola. Nurcahya gave no card to Prasetyo (despite such actions being punishable according to the FIFA Laws of the Game), instead giving it to Zola. Arema player Adam Alis was also given a yellow card by the referee relating to the call.
