= Prasetyo =

Prasetyo is an Indonesian surname. Notable people with the surname include:

- Agung Prasetyo, multiple people
- Dhani Ahmad Prasetyo (born 1972), Indonesian musician
- Dian Agus Prasetyo (born 1985), Indonesian footballer
- Didik Prasetyo (1966–2020), Indonesian singer and songwriter
- Haryanto Prasetyo (born 1978), Indonesian footballer
- Hery Prasetyo (born 1985), Indonesian footballer
- Koko Prasetyo Darkuncoro (born 1981), Indonesian beach volleyball player
- Muhammad Prasetyo (born 1947), Indonesian politician
- Wahyu Prasetyo (born 1998), Indonesian footballer
- Wisnu Yuli Prasetyo (born 1994), Indonesian badminton player

== See also ==
- Prasetyo Edi Marsudi (born 1962), Indonesian politician
