= Agung Prasetyo (footballer, born 1992) =

Indonesian footballer (born 1992)

Personal information
- Full name: Agung Prasetyo
- Date of birth: 22 December 1992 (age 33)
- Place of birth: Medan, Indonesia
- Height: 1.87 m (6 ft 2 in)
- Position: Centre-back

Team information
- Current team: Kendal Tornado
- Number: 13

Youth career
- –2010: PSDS Deli Serdang

Senior career*
Years	Team	Apps	(Gls)
2010–2011	TGM Medan	7	(0)
2011–2012	PSSA Asahan	10	(0)
2013	PSMS Medan	8	(0)
2014–2015	PSM Makassar	14	(0)
2016–2019	Semen Padang	62	(4)
2020–2021	PSMS Medan	0	(0)
2021–2022	Persita Tangerang	23	(1)
2022–2024	Borneo Samarinda	38	(3)
2024–2025	Bekasi City	5	(1)
2025–	Kendal Tornado	25	(1)

International career
2015	Indonesia U23	4	(0)
- * Club domestic league appearances and goals as of 22:00, 12 September 2026 (UTC)

Agung Prasetyo (born 22 December 1992) is an Indonesian professional footballer who plays as a centre-back for Liga 2 club Kendal Tornado.

== Club career ==
=== PSMS Medan ===
He was signed for PSMS Medan to play in Liga 2 in the 2020 season. This season was suspended on 27 March 2020 due to the COVID-19 pandemic. The season was abandoned and was declared void on 20 January 2021.

=== Persita Tangerang ===
In 2021, Agung Prasetyo signed a contract with Indonesian Liga 1 club Persita Tangerang. He made his debut on 28 August 2021 in a match against Persipura Jayapura at the Pakansari Stadium, Cibinong.

He scored his first goal for the club on 11 January 2022 in a 3–0 winning match against Persela Lamongan at Ngurah Rai Stadium. Persita's manager, Nyoman Suryanthara ensured that his team released Agung and 18 other players in preparation for Liga 1 next season, Persita's management respected Agung's decision and thanked him for joining Persita for one season. He made 23 appearances and scored one 1 goal for the club.

=== Borneo ===
Agung was signed for Borneo to play in Liga 1 in the 2022–23 season. Agung received attention for the "kungfu kick" given to the head of Arema player Gian Zola during the 2022 Indonesia President's Cup and being unpunished, with the referee instead giving red card to Zola. On 24 July 2022, Agung made his league debut in a 3–0 win over Arema at Segiri Stadium. He scored his first goal for the club on 9 December in a 2–4 winning match against PSIS Semarang at Maguwoharjo Stadium. He scored his league goal for the club, scored from free header in a 3–2 lose over Persebaya Surabaya on 3 February at Gelora Joko Samudro Stadium.

== International career ==
Agung made his debut for the Indonesia U-23 on 6 June 2015 against Cambodia U-23 in the 2015 SEA Games.

== Honours ==
Borneo Samarinda

- Piala Presiden runner-up: 2022
