= Bachtiar =

Bachtiar is a masculine given name and surname of Indonesian origin. Notable people with the name include:

== Given name ==
- Bachtiar Aly (1949–2026), Indonesian diplomat and politician
- Bachtiar Basri (1953–2025), Indonesian civil servant and politician
- Bachtiar Chamsyah (1945–2026), Indonesian politician
- Bachtiar Djafar (1939–2021), Indonesian military officer and politician
- Bachtiar Effendi (1903–1976), Indonesian film actor and director
- Bachtiar Karim (born 1957), Indonesian businessman
- Bachtiar Nasir (born 1967), Indonesian Islamist da'i and ulama
- Bachtiar Siagian (1923–2002), Indonesian film director

== Surname ==
- Achmad Iqbal Bachtiar (born 1998), Indonesian footballer
- Ahmad Mahrus Bachtiar (born 1987), Indonesian footballer
- Arovah Bachtiar (born 1934), Indonesian chess player
- Basyir Bachtiar (born 1941), Indonesian military officer and politician
- Da'i Bachtiar (born 1950), Indonesian police officer
- Opi Bachtiar (1982–2025), Indonesian actor
- Toto Sudarto Bachtiar (1929–2007), Indonesian poet and translator
