= Aulia Hidayat =

Indonesian footballer

Personal information
- Full name: Aulia Hidayat
- Date of birth: 2 May 1999 (age 27)
- Place of birth: Aceh Besar, Indonesia
- Height: 1.70 m (5 ft 7 in)
- Positions: Right-back; midfielder

Youth career
- SSB Barona Aceh
- PRA PON Remaja Aceh
- Persiraja U19
- PSAP Junior U18
- POPDA Aceh Besar
- POPWIL Aceh
- PPLP Aceh

Senior career*
Years	Team	Apps	(Gls)
2018	Borneo	1	(0)
2019	Badak Lampung	13	(3)
2020–2022	Semen Padang	9	(1)
2023–2024	Persekat Tegal	17	(0)
2024	Persiku Kudus	1	(0)

International career
2017–2018	Indonesia U19	2	(0)
- * Club domestic league appearances and goals as of 8 December 2024

Aulia Hidayat (born 2 May 1999) is an Indonesian professional footballer who plays as a right-back or a midfielder.

== Club career ==
=== Borneo ===
In 2018, Aulia signed a year contract with Indonesian Liga 1 club Borneo. He made his professional debut on 7 July 2018 in a match against Perseru Serui at the Segiri Stadium, Samarinda.

=== Badak Lampung ===
In 2019, Aulia Hidayat signed a contract with Indonesian Liga 1 club Badak Lampung. He made his debut on 18 May 2019 in a match against TIRA-Persikabo. On 5 November 2019, Aulia scored his first goal for Badak Lampung against Borneo at the Segiri Stadium, Samarinda.

=== Semen Padang ===
He was signed for Semen Padang to play in Liga 2 in the 2020 season. This season was suspended on 27 March 2020 due to the COVID-19 pandemic. The season was abandoned and was declared void on 20 January 2021.

On 6 October 2021, Aulia finally made his league debut for the club in a 1–1 draw against PSPS Riau. On 10 November 2021, Aulia scored his first league goal for Semen Padang, scored equalizer in a 1–1 draw against Sriwijaya.

=== Persekat Tegal ===
In September 2023, Aulia signed a contract with other Liga 2 club Persekat Tegal. Aulia made his league debut on 10 September 2023 in a 2–0 away lose against Gresik United.

== International career ==
On 6 June 2017, Aulia made his debut against Scotland U20 in the 2017 Toulon Tournament in France. And Aulia is one of the players that strengthen Indonesia U19 in 2018 AFC U-19 Championship.

== Career statistics ==
=== Club ===
As of match played 8 December 2024

Club	Season	League			Cup		Continental		Other		Total	
Club	Season	Division	Apps	Goals	Apps	Goals	Apps	Goals	Apps	Goals	Apps	Goals
Borneo	2018	Liga 1	1	0	0	0	0	0	0	0	1	0
Badak Lampung	2019	Liga 1	13	3	0	0	0	0	0	0	13	3
Semen Padang	2020	Liga 2	1	0	0	0	0	0	0	0	1	0
Semen Padang	2021–22	Liga 2	7	1	0	0	0	0	0	0	7	1
Semen Padang	2022–23	Liga 2	1	0	0	0	0	0	0	0	1	0
Persekat Tegal	2023–24	Liga 2	17	0	0	0	0	0	0	0	17	0
Persiku Kudus	2024–25	Liga 2	1	0	0	0	0	0	0	0	1	0
Career total			41	4	0	0	0	0	0	0	41	4
