= Irsyad Maulana =

Indonesian footballer

Personal information
- Full name: Irsyad Maulana
- Date of birth: 27 September 1993 (age 33)
- Place of birth: Batusangkar, Indonesia
- Height: 1.77 m (5 ft 10 in)
- Positions: Winger; attacking midfielder

Team information
- Current team: Persis Solo
- Number: 88

Youth career
- 2009–2011: Semen Padang
- 2011–2012: Pelita Jaya

Senior career*
Years	Team	Apps	(Gls)
2012–2014	Arema Cronus	19	(4)
2014–2020	Semen Padang	127	(28)
2015–2016	→ Persija Jakarta (loan)	10	(0)
2020–2021	PSM Makassar	0	(0)
2020–2021	→ Semen Padang (loan)	10	(0)
2021–2022	Persita Tangerang	26	(5)
2022–2023	Arema	15	(1)
2023–2025	Persita Tangerang	51	(5)
2025–2026	Semen Padang	20	(1)
2026–	Persis Solo	1	(0)

International career
2016	Indonesia	1	(0)
- * Club domestic league appearances and goals as of 22:47, 20 September 2026 (UTC)

Irsyad Maulana (born 27 September 1993) is an Indonesian professional footballer who plays as a winger or an attacking midfielder for Championship club Persis Solo.

At a young age, after strengthening the West Sumatra Student Education Training Center (PPLP) team, he then played in the Semen Padang youth team. His outstanding performance in the Soeratin Cup then led him to be called up to the West Sumatra contingent team that would compete in 2012 Pekan Olahraga Nasional. The tournament then became the momentum where Irsyad became more famous. Semen Padang's first team tried to recruit him, but apparently lost quickly to Pelita Jaya, which at that time was still coached by Rahmad Darmawan. Irsyad played for Pelita Jaya in the U-21 team, before joining Arema in 2012.

== Club career ==
=== Arema ===
In 2012, He began his career at Arema, in his first season in Malang did quite well. From 18 appearances he managed to score four goals in all competitions.

Two years with Arema, in his last season, he successfully brought Arema to runner-up 2013 Indonesia Super League and brought the semifinals of the 2014 Indonesia Super League.

=== Semen Padang ===
Ahead of the 2015 General Sudirman Cup pre-season tournament, Irsyad returned to his hometown and joined Semen Padang as an exchange player with a player of the same position, Estebán Vizcarra who joined Arema. On 4 April 2015, Irsyad made his official debut for Semen Padang, playing as a starter in a 1–0 lose over Persib Bandung.

==== Loan to Persija Jakarta ====
In August 2015, he signed for Persija Jakarta, on loan from Semen Padang. Irsyad was not loaned out to Persija Jakarta for too long. He was only played in the 2015 Indonesia President's Cup tournament. In the same year, Irsyad returned to his hometown to return to Semen Padang.

=== Return to Semen Padang ===
==== 2016 season ====
On 28 May 2016, Irsyad scored his first league goal for Kabau Sirah, scoring a brace in a 4–0 home win against Persela Lamongan in the 2016 Indonesia Soccer Championship A. On 15 July, he scored another brace for the club in a 2–1 home win against the rival Sriwijaya, with a 2–1 victory, brought Semen Padang to 5th place league table. He added his fifth goals for the club on 12 August with one goal against Bhayangkara SU in a 2–1 home win at Gelora Haji Agus Salim Stadium. He continued his good form with the opening goal in a 3–0 victory over Bali United on 3 October at Agus Salim. On 28 October, Irsyad was a starter in a match against his former club Arema at Agus Salim Stadium, also scored a penalty-kick in a 1–3 home lose. On 12 December, he was involved in Semen Padang's 3–2 home win over Mitra Kukar, scoring in the 59th minute.

==== 2017 season ====
Irsyad scored his first goal of the 2017 season on 21 April 2017, in an away game against Gresik United. The game ended in a 1–3 victory for Semen Padang. He scored the winning goal in a 1–0 home win against Persela Lamongan on 3 July. On 21 July, Irsyad provided an assist of the season for Marcel Sacramento in a 2–0 home win over Arema. And continued scored a brace of the season in a 5–3 away game lose over the same opponent on 4 November. By the end of the 2017 season, he was a starter in all of the club's Liga 1 fixtures, only missed three matches, as Semen Padang finished in 16th place on the Liga 1 table, and ensure relegation to Liga 2 next season.

==== 2018 season: First time in Liga 2 with Semen Padang ====
On 23 April 2018, he started his match in the 2018 Liga 2 season for Semen Padang, playing as a starter in an away 3–0 lose over Persis Solo. On 9 May, Irsyad provided an assist from corner kick in the Liga 2 match for Rosad Setiawan in a 2–0 home win over Persika Karawang. Irsyad scored his first goal of the 2018 Liga 2 season, scoring a first hat-trick in a 3–2 home win against Persiraja Banda Aceh on 8 July. Irsyad scored opening goal for the team, scoring a penalty-kick in a 1–1 draw with PSPS Riau on 24 July. He scored a brace in a 3–1 home win against Cilegon United on 4 August, including one from a penalty. and scored another brace in a 2–0 win over Persibat Batang on 14 September. He added his ninth goals of the season on 10 November with one goal against Aceh United in a 2–3 away win at Cot Gapu Stadium. On 28 November, he scored again for the club, scoring a penalty in a 3–1 win over Persita Tangerang. With an aggregate of 3–2, Semen Padang became the team that qualified for the Liga 2 final and ensured promotion and return to the highest caste Liga 1 next season. Although, in the final match, they lost 0–2 to PSS Sleman, and won 2nd place.

==== 2019 season: Final season with Semen Padang ====
Irsyad spent pre-season 2019 season with Semen Padang in the 2019 Indonesia President's Cup Group Stage, scoring one goal in a 2–0 win against Mitra Kukar on 14 March 2019. On 8 July, Irsyad came on as a starter in Semen Padang's 1–3 lose over TIRA-Persikabo and scored his first Liga 1 goal of the season in the 71st minute. On 16 August, he scored the winning goal against PSIS Semarang in the Liga 1 in a 1–0 win. He then scored a brace against PS Barito Putera on 1 September in the game week 17 of Liga 1, in a 2–3 lose at Agus Salim Stadium. On 28 October, Irsyad was pulled off in the 63rd minute, replaced by Mariando Uropmabin in a match against Arema, due to an ankle injury, he had to receive further treatment.

On 8 January 2020, Irsyad officially left Semen Padang, the decision he made was for the betterment of his career. During six seasons with Semen Padang, Irsyad has always been a mainstay on the front lines until finally becoming Hengky Ardiles' successor as captain.

=== PSM Makassar ===
On 10 January 2020, he signed a contract with Liga 1 club PSM Makassar. Irsyad made his club debut in the 2020 AFC Cup qualifying play-offs on 22 January against Liga Futebol Amadora Primeira Divisão club Lalenok United, he also registered two assist in a 1–4 win in first leg match. And continued scored his first goal in second leg play-off round in a 3–1 home win over the same opponent a week later. After scoring a header, his nose hit the head of an opposing defender and bled. Then he was immediately taken to the hospital for further treatment. He will also miss the inaugural match of the 2020 Liga 1, because he is recovering from an injury.

==== Return to Semen Padang (loan) ====
Irsyad with his teammates, Leo Guntara signed for his old club Semen Padang to play in the 2020 Liga 2, on loan from PSM Makassar. However, the plan failed to happen considering that there was no certainty from PSSI and LIB to hold the Liga 2 again due to COVID-19 pandemic, so he decided to leave the club.

=== Persita Tangerang ===
Ahead of the pre-season Menpora Cup tournament and the 2021–22 Liga 1, Irsyad signed a contract with Liga 1 club Persita Tangerang. He played three matches in Menpora Cup and registered one assist. And made his club debut on 28 August 2021, coming on as a starter, also scored his first league goal in 23rd minute in a 1–2 win against Persipura Jayapura. On 11 September, Irsyad scored equalizer in a 1–2 lose against Persib Bandung. And continued scored equalizer again in a 1–1 draw against Persija Jakarta on 28 September. His performances in October and November saw him provide one assist each in the win against Persikabo 1973 on 22 October, and win against Madura United on 6 November. On 18 November, he scored the opening goal in a 2–1 over Bhayangkara at Maguwoharjo Stadium.

He continued scored his fifth goal of the season in a 3–0 win against Persela Lamongan on 11 January 2022. But he was pulled-off in the second half with a serious injury, which ruled him out for the next few games. Throughout the 2021–22 season, he is trusted to appear regularly in the left winger for 24 matches. he contributed this season with the club by scoring five goals and two assists.

=== Return to Arema ===
On 27 April 2022, Irsyad moved to Malang and decided joined his former club Arema on free transfer. Irsyad made his Arema debut in a pre-season 2022 Indonesia President's Cup against Persik Kediri on 15 June as a substituted Dendi Santoso, also scored his first goal for Arema in a 1–0 win in injury time. He won his first trophy with the club in July 2022, making first leg and second leg appearances in the Indonesia President's Cup final against Borneo Samarinda. On 24 July, he made his Liga 1 debut in a 3–0 lose against Borneo Samarinda. On 17 September, Irsyad scored his first league goal for Arema in a 0–1 away win over Persik Kediri. His performances in December saw him provide one assist each in the win against Dewa United on 7 December, and win against Persis Solo four days later. Lack of playing minutes, made him decide to leave the club. He contributed by playing 415 minutes in 13 matches, ans only scored one goal and two assists.

=== Return to Persita Tangerang ===
He decided to Tangerang and was signed for Persita Tangerang to play in Liga 1 in the rest of 2022–23 season. On 18 January 2023, he made his league debut in a 0–5 lose against Persebaya Surabaya. On 7 March, he scored his first goal for the club, opening the scoring in a 1–1 draw over Bali United at Maguwoharjo. On 9 April, he scored a brace for Persita in a 4–0 home win against Persib Bandung.

== Career statistics ==
=== International ===
As of match played 11 June 2016

Appearances and goals by national team and year
National team	Year	Apps	Goals
Indonesia	2016	1	0
Total		1	0

== Honours ==
=== Club ===
Arema

- Indonesia Super League runner-up: 2013
- East Java Governor Cup: 2013
- Menpora Cup: 2013
- Piala Presiden: 2022

Semen Padang

- Liga 2 runner-up: 2018

=== Individual ===
- Liga 1 Goal of the Month: September 2021
