= Miftah Anwar Sani =

Indonesian former footballer

Personal information
- Full name: Miftah Anwar Sani
- Date of birth: 19 November 1995 (age 30)
- Place of birth: Salatiga, Indonesia
- Height: 1.78 m (5 ft 10 in)
- Position: Left-back

Youth career
- 2011–2013: GDTC
- 2012: SSB Saint Prima
- 2017: PS TNI U21

Senior career*
Years	Team	Apps	(Gls)
2017–2019	TIRA-Persikabo	0	(0)
2017–2018	→ PPSM Magelang (loan)	4	(0)
2018–2019	→ Madura (loan)	3	(0)
2019–2020	Badak Lampung	12	(0)
2020–2021	Persita Tangerang	0	(0)
2021	Sloboda Tuzla	0	(0)
2021–2022	Barito Putera	24	(0)
2022–2023	Dewa United	17	(0)
2023–2024	Kalteng Putra	7	(1)
2024–2025	Semen Padang	4	(0)
2025	Madura United	1	(0)

International career
2021	Indonesia	1	(0)
- * Club domestic league appearances and goals as of 18 January 2025

Miftah Anwar Sani (born 19 November 1995) is an Indonesian professional footballer who plays as a left-back.

== Club career ==
=== Persita Tangerang ===
Sani signed with Persita Tangerang to play in the Indonesian Liga 1 for the 2020 season. This season was suspended on 27 March 2020 due to the COVID-19 pandemic. The season was abandoned and was declared void on 20 January 2021.

=== Sloboda Tuzla ===
On 16 February 2021, he signed a one-year contract with Bosnian Premier League club Sloboda Tuzla. However, Miftah in May 2021 decided to cease the contract and return to Indonesia without playing a single match after failing to earn a work permit.

=== Barito Putera ===
He signed a contract to play for Liga 1 club Barito Putera in the 2021 Liga 1 season. Miftah made his league debut on 11 September 2021 in a match against Bali United at the Indomilk Arena, Tangerang.

=== Dewa United ===
Miftah was signed for Dewa United to play in Liga 1 in the 2022–23 season. He made his league debut on 25 July 2022 in a match against Persis Solo at the Moch. Soebroto Stadium, Magelang.

== International career ==
He made his official international debut on 7 October 2021, against Chinese Taipei in a 2023 AFC Asian Cup qualification – play-off round match.

== Career statistics ==
=== Club ===
As of match played 18 January 2025.

Club	Season	League			Cup		Continental		Other		Total	
Club	Season	Division	Apps	Goals	Apps	Goals	Apps	Goals	Apps	Goals	Apps	Goals
TIRA-Persikabo	2017	Liga 1	0	0	0	0	–		0	0	0	0
PPSM Magelang (loan)	2017	Liga 2	4	0	0	0	–		0	0	4	0
Madura (loan)	2018	Liga 2	3	0	0	0	–		0	0	3	0
Badak Lampung	2019	Liga 1	12	0	0	0	–		0	0	12	0
Persita Tangerang	2020	Liga 1	0	0	0	0	–		0	0	0	0
Sloboda Tuzla	2020–21	Bosnian Premier League	0	0	–		–		–		0	0
Barito Putera	2021–22	Liga 1	24	0	0	0	–		0	0	24	0
Dewa United	2022–23	Liga 1	17	0	0	0	–		4 (Note: Appearances in Indonesia President's Cup)	1	21	1
Kalteng Putra	2023–24	Liga 2	7	1	0	0	–		0	0	7	1
Semen Padang	2024–25	Liga 1	4	0	0	0	–		0	0	4	0
Madura United	2024–25	Liga 1	1	0	0	0	–		0	0	1	0
Career total			72	1	0	0	–		4	1	76	2

=== International ===
As of match played 7 October 2021

Appearances and goals by national team and year
National team	Year	Apps	Goals
Indonesia	2021	1	0
Total		1	0
