= Agung Prasetyo =

Agung Prasetyo may refer to:

- Agung Prasetyo (footballer, born 1978)
- Agung Prasetyo (footballer, born 1992)
