= Riki Dwi Saputro =

Indonesian footballer (born 1995)

Personal information
- Full name: Riki Dwi Saputro
- Date of birth: 20 February 1995 (age 31)
- Place of birth: Siak, Indonesia
- Height: 1.75 m (5 ft 9 in)
- Position: Forward

Team information
- Current team: Adhyaksa Bekasi
- Number: 20

Senior career*
| Years | Team | Apps | (Gls) |
| 2016–2020 | PSPS Pekanbaru | 76 | (10) |
| 2021–2022 | Persekat Tegal | 9 | (1) |
| 2022 | → PSS Sleman (loan) | 14 | (2) |
| 2022–2024 | PSS Sleman | 32 | (5) |
| 2024 | PSPS Pekanbaru | 6 | (0) |
| 2024–2026 | Persekat Tegal | 33 | (3) |
| 2026– | Adhyaksa Bekasi | 1 | (0) |
- * Club domestic league appearances and goals as of 18 September 2026

Riki Dwi Saputro (born 20 February 1995) is an Indonesian professional footballer who plays as a forward for Championship club Adhyaksa Bekasi.

== Club career ==
=== Persekat Tegal ===
In 2021, Riki Saputro signed a contract with Indonesian Liga 2 club Persekat Tegal. He made his league debut on 27 September 2021 in a match against Badak Lampung at the Gelora Bung Karno Madya Stadium, Jakarta. On 18 October 2021, he scored his first goal for Persekat, as they win 1–3 against Perserang Serang.

=== PSS Sleman ===
He was signed for PSS Sleman to play in Liga 1 in the 2021 season, on loan from Liga 2 club Persekat Tegal. Riki made his league debut on 7 January 2022 in a match against Persiraja Banda Aceh at the Ngurah Rai Stadium, Denpasar. He also scored his first goal and provided two assists for the team in a 4–1 win. On 18 January 2022, he scored equalizer in a 1–1 draw over Madura United.

At the end of his loan season, Riki signed for PSS Sleman in May 2022. On 11 June, he came on as a starter during the 2022 Indonesia President's Cup, a 0–0 draw over Persis Solo. In June 2022, he scored in both President's Cup group stage matches against Persita Tangerang and PSIS Semarang. Coming on as a substitutes, Riki scored his first goal of the season and provided an assist for Dave Mustaine in a 3–3 draw over RANS Nusantara on 29 July. On 5 August, Riki was pulled off in the second half against Arema, due to an instep injury.

On 26 February 2023, he scored the opening goal for the club in a 1–2 lose over Persikabo 1973 at Maguwoharjo Stadium. Riki scored his third goal of the season in a 2–1 away lose against Madura United on 11 March. And continued scored his fourth goal in a 5–2 loss to PSIS Semarang on 2 April.

== Career statistics ==
=== Club ===
As of 18 September 2026.

| Club | Season | League | | | Domestic Cup | | Continental | | Other | | Total | |
| Club | Season | Division | Apps | Goals | Apps | Goals | Apps | Goals | Apps | Goals | Apps | Goals |
|---|---|---|---|---|---|---|---|---|---|---|---|---|
| PSPS Riau | 2016 | ISC B | 18 | 3 | 0 | 0 | – | | 0 | 0 | 18 | 3 |
| PSPS Riau | 2017 | Liga 2 | 20 | 2 | 0 | 0 | – | | 0 | 0 | 20 | 2 |
| PSPS Riau | 2018 | Liga 2 | 16 | 0 | 0 | 0 | – | | 0 | 0 | 16 | 0 |
| PSPS Riau | 2019 | Liga 2 | 21 | 5 | 0 | 0 | – | | 0 | 0 | 21 | 5 |
| PSPS Riau | 2020 | Liga 2 | 1 | 0 | 0 | 0 | – | | 0 | 0 | 1 | 0 |
| PSPS Riau | Total | | 76 | 10 | 0 | 0 | – | | 0 | 0 | 76 | 10 |
| Persekat Tegal | 2021 | Liga 2 | 9 | 1 | 0 | 0 | – | | 0 | 0 | 9 | 1 |
| PSS Sleman (loan) | 2021–22 | Liga 1 | 14 | 2 | 0 | 0 | – | | 0 | 0 | 14 | 2 |
| PSS Sleman | 2022–23 | Liga 1 | 19 | 4 | 0 | 0 | – | | 7 (Note: Appearances in Indonesia President's Cup) | 2 | 26 | 6 |
| PSS Sleman | 2023–24 | Liga 1 | 13 | 1 | 0 | 0 | – | | 0 | 0 | 13 | 1 |
| PSS Sleman | Total | | 32 | 5 | 0 | 0 | – | | 7 | 2 | 39 | 7 |
| PSPS Riau | 2024–25 | Liga 2 | 6 | 0 | 0 | 0 | – | | 0 | 0 | 6 | 0 |
| Persekat Tegal | 2024–25 | Liga 2 | 8 | 0 | 0 | 0 | – | | 0 | 0 | 8 | 0 |
| Persekat Tegal | 2025–26 | Championship | 25 | 3 | 0 | 0 | – | | 0 | 0 | 25 | 3 |
| Adhyaksa Bekasi | 2026–27 | Championship | 1 | 0 | 0 | 0 | – | | 0 | 0 | 1 | 0 |
| Career total | | | 171 | 21 | 0 | 0 | – | | 7 | 2 | 178 | 23 |
