= Nurdiansyah =

Indonesian footballer (born 1998)

Personal information
- Full name: Nurdiansyah
- Date of birth: 18 December 1998 (age 27)
- Place of birth: Jombang, Indonesia
- Height: 1.76 m (5 ft 9 in)
- Position: Centre-back

Team information
- Current team: Semen Padang
- Number: 17

Youth career
- 2015–2017: Borneo Samarinda

Senior career*
Years	Team	Apps	(Gls)
2017–2019	Borneo Samarinda	18	(1)
2018	→ Persika Karawang (loan)	2	(0)
2020–2021	Arema	2	(0)
2021–2023	Borneo Samarinda	23	(1)
2022–2023	→ PSS Sleman (loan)	17	(0)
2023–2024	PSS Sleman	15	(0)
2024–2026	Madura United	26	(0)
2026–	Semen Padang	0	(0)
- * Club domestic league appearances and goals as of 3 March 2026

Nurdiansyah (also Nur Diansyah, born 18 December 1998) is an Indonesian professional footballer who plays as a centre-back for Championship club Semen Padang.

== Club career ==
=== Borneo F.C. Samarinda ===
In 2017, Nurdiansyah signed for Liga 1 club Borneo Samarinda. He made his debut on 4 August 2019 against PSS Sleman. On 4 August 2019, Nur Diansyah scored his first goal for Borneo against PSS Sleman in the 71st minute at the Segiri Stadium, Samarinda.

==== Persika Karawang (loan) ====
He was signed for Persika Karawang to play in Liga 2 in the 2018 season, on loan from Borneo Samarinda.

=== Arema F.C. ===
He was signed for Arema to play in Liga 1 in the 2020 season. Nur Diansyah made his debut on 2 March 2020 in a match against TIRA-Persikabo. This season was suspended on 27 March 2020 due to the COVID-19 pandemic. The season was abandoned and was declared void on 20 January 2021.

=== Return to Borneo F.C. Samarinda ===
In 2021, it was confirmed that Nur Diansyah would re-join Boneo Samarinda, signing a year contract. Nur Diansyah made his debut on 4 September 2021 in a match against Persebaya Surabaya at the Wibawa Mukti Stadium, Cikarang.

==== PSS Sleman (loan) ====
He was signed for PSS Sleman to play in Liga 1 in the 2022 season, on loan from Boneo Samarinda. Nur Diansyah made his league debut on 29 July 2022 in a match against RANS Nusantara at the Pakansari Stadium, Cibinong.

== Career statistics ==
=== Club ===
As of match played 3 March 2026

Club	Season	League			Cup (Note: Includes Piala Indonesia)		Continental		Other		Total	
Club	Season	Division	Apps	Goals	Apps	Goals	Apps	Goals	Apps	Goals	Apps	Goals
Borneo	2018	Liga 1	0	0	0	0	–		0	0	0	0
Borneo	2019	Liga 1	18	1	0	0	–		0	0	18	1
Borneo	Total		18	1	0	0	–		0	0	18	1
Persika Karawang (loan)	2018	Liga 2	2	0	0	0	–		0	0	2	0
Arema	2020	Liga 1	2	0	0	0	–		0	0	2	0
Borneo Samarinda	2021–22	Liga 1	23	1	0	0	–		1 (Note: Appearances in Menpora Cup)	0	24	1
Borneo Samarinda	2022–23	Liga 1	0	0	0	0	–		4 (Note: Appearances in Indonesia President's Cup)	0	4	0
Borneo Samarinda	Total		23	1	0	0	–		5	0	28	1
PSS Sleman (loan)	2022–23	Liga 1	17	0	0	0	–		0	0	17	0
PSS Sleman	2023–24	Liga 1	15	0	0	0	–		0	0	15	0
Madura United	2024–25	Liga 1	15	0	0	0	–		0	0	15	0
Madura United	2025–26	Super League	11	0	0	0	–		0	0	11	0
Career total			103	2	0	0	0	0	5	0	108	2

== Honours ==
Borneo Samarinda

- Piala Presiden runner-up: 2022
