= Leo Guntara =

Indonesian footballer (born 1994)

Personal information
- Full name: Leo Guntara
- Date of birth: 17 August 1994 (age 32)
- Place of birth: Padang, Indonesia
- Height: 1.71 m (5 ft 7 in)
- Positions: Left back; midfielder

Team information
- Current team: Arema
- Number: 4

Youth career
- 2012: Persisko
- 2012–2013: Sriwijaya
- 2014: Semen Padang

Senior career*
Years	Team	Apps	(Gls)
2015–2016	Semen Padang	8	(0)
2016–2017	Bali United	2	(0)
2017	PSPS Pekanbaru	18	(0)
2018–2019	Semen Padang	53	(2)
2020–2021	PSM Makassar	2	(0)
2020	→ Semen Padang (loan)	0	(0)
2021–2026	Borneo Samarinda	118	(2)
2025–2026	→ Semen Padang (loan)	17	(0)
2026–	Arema	18	(0)
- * Club domestic league appearances and goals as of 20 November 2026

Leo Guntara (born 17 August 1994) is an Indonesian professional footballer who plays for Super League club Arema. mainly as a left back but also as a left midfielder.

== Club career ==
Leo is a Semen Padang F.C. player which has twice felt the Indonesia Super League U-21 title, when he joined Sriwijaya U-21 in 2013 and Semen Padang U-21 2014.

He managed to bring Semen Padang U-21 won in the Indonesia Super League U-21 for the first time in this year after defeating Sriwijaya FC U-21.

== Honours ==
Sriwijaya U21

- Indonesia Super League U-21: 2012–13

Semen Padang U21

- Indonesia Super League U-21: 2014

Semen Padang

- Liga 2 runner-up: 2018

Borneo Samarinda

- Piala Presiden runner-up: 2022, 2024
