= Octovianus Kapisa =

Indonesian footballer (born 1996)

Octo Kapisa
Personal information
- Full name: Octovianus Otto Kapisa
- Date of birth: 15 December 1996 (age 29)
- Place of birth: Biak Numfor, Indonesia
- Height: 1.84 m (6 ft 0 in)
- Positions: Centre-back; left-back

Team information
- Current team: Semen Padang
- Number: 3

Senior career*
Years	Team	Apps	(Gls)
2022–2024	PSBS Biak	15	(0)
2024–2025	Sriwijaya	6	(0)
2025–2026	Sumsel United	14	(1)
2026–	Semen Padang	2	(0)
- * Club domestic league appearances and goals as of 21 September 2026

Octovianus Otto Kapisa (born 15 December 1996) is an Indonesian professional footballer who plays as a centre-back or left-back for Championship club Semen Padang.

== Club career ==
=== PSBS Biak ===
Born in Biak Numfor, Papua, Kapisa began his professional football career representing his hometown club PSBS Biak. He made his league debut on 30 August 2022 in a match against Putra Delta Sidoarjo at the Gelora Supriyadi Stadium.

After nearly two seasons in Liga 2 and still being part of the team, he helped the club secure promotion to Liga 1.

=== Sriwijaya and Sumsel United ===
Kapisa later moved to South Sumatra, joining Sriwijaya during the 2024–25 season where he established himself as a robust defensive presence and occasionally served as the team captain. He subsequently spent the 2025–26 season playing for Sumsel United in the Championship, notably scoring several crucial match-deciding goals from set-pieces.

=== Semen Padang ===
In June 2026, ahead of the 2026–27 season, Kapisa officially signed with Semen Padang under head coach Nil Maizar as part of a tactical squad overhaul aiming for promotion to the top tier. Kapisa made his league debut for Semen Padang on 13 September 2026, in a 0–1 away win over Persiraja Banda Aceh at the H. Dimurthala Stadium.
