= Kasim Botan =

Indonesian footballer

Personal information
- Full name: Muhamad Kasim Botan
- Date of birth: 14 April 1997 (age 29)
- Place of birth: Adonara, Indonesia
- Height: 1.70 m (5 ft 7 in)
- Position: Winger

Team information
- Current team: Semen Padang
- Number: 22

Youth career
- 2014–2016: Harbi Putra Academy

Senior career*
| Years | Team | Apps | (Gls) |
| 2017 | Persepam Madura Utama | 16 | (3) |
| 2018 | Persid Jember | 7 | (1) |
| 2018 | Persiba Bantul | 3 | (0) |
| 2019–2021 | PSCS Cilacap | 24 | (2) |
| 2022 | Persita Tangerang | 17 | (2) |
| 2022–2023 | Bhayangkara | 22 | (2) |
| 2023–2025 | Persebaya Surabaya | 56 | (1) |
| 2025–2026 | PSIM Yogyakarta | 1 | (0) |
| 2026 | → Semen Padang (loan) | 16 | (0) |
| 2026– | Semen Padang | 0 | (0) |
- * Club domestic league appearances and goals as of 23 May 2026

Muhamad Kasim Botan (born 14 April 1997) is an Indonesian professional footballer who plays as a winger for Championship club Semen Padang.

== Club career ==
=== Persita Tangerang ===
He was signed for Persita Tangerang to play in Liga 1 in the 2021 season. Botan made his league debut on 7 January 2022 in a match against Persib Bandung at the Ngurah Rai Stadium, Denpasar.

=== Bhayangkara ===
Botan was signed for Bhayangkara to play in Liga 1 in the 2022–23 season. He made his league debut on 24 July 2022 in a match against Persib Bandung at the Wibawa Mukti Stadium, Cikarang. On 23 December, Botan made his first league goal for the club in Liga 1, opening the scoring in a 1–0 won against Arema at the Manahan Stadium.

On 9 January 2023, Botan scored the decisive goal in a 0–1 away win against PSIS Semarang at the Jatidiri Stadium, he was also selected as man of the match in that match.

=== Persebaya Surabaya ===
Botan was signed for Persebaya Surabaya to play in Liga 1 in the 2023–24 season. He made his debut on 1 July 2023 in a match against Persis Solo at the Manahan Stadium, Surakarta.

=== PSIM Yogyakarta ===
On 28 June 2025, Botan officially signed with Liga 1 club PSIM Yogyakarta.

== Career statistics ==
=== Club ===
As of 17 October 2025.

| Club | Season | League | | | Domestic Cup (Note: Includes Piala Indonesia) | | Continental | | Other | | Total | |
| Club | Season | Division | Apps | Goals | Apps | Goals | Apps | Goals | Apps | Goals | Apps | Goals |
|---|---|---|---|---|---|---|---|---|---|---|---|---|
| Persepam Madura Utama | 2017 | Liga 2 | 16 | 3 | 0 | 0 | – | | 0 | 0 | 16 | 3 |
| Persid Jember | 2018 | Liga 3 | 7 | 1 | 1 | 0 | – | | 0 | 0 | 8 | 1 |
| Persiba Bantul | 2018 | Liga 3 | 3 | 0 | 0 | 0 | – | | 0 | 0 | 3 | 0 |
| PSCS Cilacap | 2019 | Liga 2 | 14 | 0 | 0 | 0 | – | | 0 | 0 | 14 | 0 |
| PSCS Cilacap | 2020 | Liga 2 | 0 | 0 | 0 | 0 | – | | 0 | 0 | 0 | 0 |
| PSCS Cilacap | 2021–22 | Liga 2 | 10 | 2 | 0 | 0 | – | | 0 | 0 | 10 | 2 |
| PSCS Cilacap | Total | | 24 | 2 | 0 | 0 | – | | 0 | 0 | 24 | 2 |
| Persita Tangerang | 2021–22 | Liga 1 | 17 | 2 | 0 | 0 | – | | 0 | 0 | 17 | 2 |
| Bhayangkara | 2022–23 | Liga 1 | 22 | 2 | 0 | 0 | – | | 4 (Note: Appearances in Indonesia President's Cup) | 0 | 26 | 2 |
| Persebaya Surabaya | 2023–24 | Liga 1 | 30 | 0 | 0 | 0 | – | | 0 | 0 | 30 | 0 |
| Persebaya Surabaya | 2024–25 | Liga 1 | 26 | 1 | 0 | 0 | – | | 0 | 0 | 26 | 1 |
| Persebaya Surabaya | Total | | 56 | 1 | 0 | 0 | – | | 0 | 0 | 56 | 1 |
| PSIM Yogyakarta | 2025–26 | Super League | 1 | 0 | 0 | 0 | – | | 0 | 0 | 1 | 0 |
| Career total | | | 146 | 11 | 1 | 0 | 0 | 0 | 4 | 0 | 151 | 11 |
