= Achmad Iqbal Bachtiar =

Indonesian association footballer

Iqbal Bachtiar
Personal information
- Full name: Achmad Iqbal Bachtiar
- Date of birth: 2 May 1998 (age 28)
- Place of birth: Sidoarjo, Indonesia
- Height: 1.87 m (6 ft 2 in)
- Position: Goalkeeper

Team information
- Current team: Semen Padang
- Number: 89

Youth career
- SSB Bulog
- SSB Persada
- 2012–2014: Frenz United

Senior career*
Years	Team	Apps	(Gls)
2017	Madura	8	(0)
2018–2024	Semen Padang	16	(0)
2025–	Semen Padang	1	(0)

International career
2013	Indonesia U16		
- * Club domestic league appearances and goals as of 15 May 2026

Achmad Iqbal Bachtiar (born 2 May 1998) is an Indonesian professional footballer who plays as a goalkeeper for Semen Padang.

== Club career ==
=== Semen Padang ===
He was signed for Semen Padang to play in Liga 2 in the 2018 season.

== Honours ==
=== Club ===
Semen Padang

- Liga 2 runner-up: 2018, 2023–24
