= Jonathan Bustos =

Argentine professional footballer

Personal information
- Full name: Jonathan Ezequiel Bustos
- Date of birth: 29 June 1994 (age 32)
- Place of birth: Buenos Aires, Argentina
- Height: 1.71 m (5 ft 7 in)
- Position: Attacking midfielder

Team information
- Current team: PSIS Semarang
- Number: 10

Senior career*
Years	Team	Apps	(Gls)
2011–2014	Huracán	29	(2)
2015–2019	Platense	68	(7)
2019–2020	AEL	22	(1)
2020	Platense	3	(0)
2021	Melgar	6	(0)
2021–2023	Borneo	58	(10)
2023–2024	PSS Sleman	29	(6)
2024	Al-Quwa Al-Jawiya	0	(0)
2025	Malut United	9	(0)
2025	Persela Lamongan	12	(5)
2026	The Strongest	0	(0)
2026–	PSIS Semarang	9	(1)
- * Club domestic league appearances and goals as of 21 November 2026

Jonathan Ezequiel Bustos (born 29 June 1994) is an Argentine professional footballer who plays as an attacking midfielder for Championship club PSIS Semarang.

== Career ==
Bustos started his career with Huracán. He made his senior debut in Primera B Nacional on 10 December 2011 against Gimnasia y Esgrima, which was followed by his first goal in the succeeding April in a defeat to Deportivo Merlo. A further goal versus Atlanta followed, in a season which he ended with eleven appearances; as well as with his opening senior red card, which occurred in a fixture with Atlético Tucumán. Bustos remained for the subsequent 2012–13 and 2013–14 campaigns, adding nineteen more appearances. On 30 January 2015, Bustos moved to Primera B Metropolitana's Platense. His fourth season ended with promotion.

== Career statistics ==
As of 21 November 2026

Appearances and goals by club, season and competition
Club	Season	League			Cup		Continental		Other		Total	
Club	Season	Division	Apps	Goals	Apps	Goals	Apps	Goals	Apps	Goals	Apps	Goals
Huracán	2011–12	Primera B Nacional	11	2	0	0	—		0	0	11	2
Huracán	2012–13	Primera B Nacional	16	0	0	0	—		0	0	16	0
Huracán	2013–14	Primera B Nacional	2	0	1	0	—		0	0	3	0
Huracán	2014	Primera B Nacional	0	0	0	0	—		0	0	0	0
Huracán	Total		29	2	1	0	—		0	0	30	2
Platense	2015	Primera B Metropolitana	26	3	0	0	—		1 (Note: Appearance(s) in the Primera B Metropolitana play-offs)	0	27	3
Platense	2016	Primera B Metropolitana	11	1	0	0	—		0	0	11	1
Platense	2016–17	Primera B Metropolitana	25	3	0	0	—		0	0	25	3
Platense	2017–18	Primera B Metropolitana	1	0	0	0	—		0	0	1	0
Platense	2018–19	Primera B Nacional	5	0	0	0	—		0	0	5	0
Platense	Total		68	7	0	0	—		1	0	69	7
AEL	2019–20	Super League Greece	22	1	2	0	—		0	0	24	1
Platense	2020	Primera B Nacional	3	0	0	0	—		0	0	3	0
Melgar	2021	Peruvian Primera División	6	0	0	0	—		0	0	6	0
Borneo	2021–22	Liga 1	28	5	0	0	—		6 (Note: Appearance(s) in the 2022 Piala Presiden)	1	34	6
Borneo	2022–23	Liga 1	30	5	0	0	—		0	0	30	5
Borneo	Total		58	10	0	0	—		6	1	64	11
PSS Sleman	2023–24	Liga 1	29	6	0	0	—		0	0	29	6
Malut United	2024–25	Liga 1	9	0	0	0	—		0	0	9	0
Persela Lamongan	2025–26	Championship	12	5	0	0	—		0	0	12	5
The Strongest	2026	División Profesional	0	0	0	0	1 (Note: Appearance(s) in the 2026 Copa Libertadores)	0	0	0	1	0
PSIS Semarang	2026–27	Championship	9	1	0	0	—		—		9	1
Career total			245	32	3	0	1	0	7	1	256	33

== Honours ==
Platense

- Primera B Metropolitana: 2017–18

Borneo Samarinda

- Piala Presiden runner-up: 2022
