= Rifky Suryawan =

Indonesian footballer

Personal information
- Full name: Muhammad Rifky Suryawan
- Date of birth: 7 June 1995 (age 31)
- Place of birth: Yogyakarta, Indonesia
- Height: 1.79 m (5 ft 10 in)
- Position: Winger

Senior career*
Years	Team	Apps	(Gls)
2016–2018	PSIM Yogyakarta	29	(1)
2019	Babel United	1	(0)
2020	Martapura	0	(0)
2021–2022	Barito Putera	9	(0)
2022–2023	PSS Sleman	19	(0)
2023	PSIS Semarang	0	(0)
2023–2024	→ Bekasi City (loan)	4	(1)
2024	Persekat Tegal	3	(0)
- * Club domestic league appearances and goals as of 25 September 2024

Muhammad Rifky Suryawan (born 7 June 1995) is an Indonesian professional footballer who plays as a winger for Liga 2 club Persekat Tegal.

== Club career ==
=== Martapura F.C. ===
Rifky signed with Martapura to play in the Indonesian Liga 2 for the 2020 season. This season was suspended on 27 March 2020 due to the COVID-19 pandemic. The season was abandoned and was declared void on 20 January 2021.

=== PS Barito Putera ===
He was signed for Barito Putera to play in Liga 1 in the 2021 season. Rifky made his league debut on 4 September 2021 in a match against Persib Bandung at the Indomilk Arena, Tangerang.

=== PSS Sleman ===
Rifky was signed for PSS Sleman to play in Liga 1 in the 2022–23 season. He made his league debut on 23 July 2022 in a match against PSM Makassar at the Maguwoharjo Stadium, Sleman.

=== PSIS Semarang ===
On 11 May 2023, Rifky became a new PSIS Semarang recruit in the winger position. Rifky was recruited due to the interest of head coach Gilbert Agius when this left-footed dominant player played against PSIS Semarang some time ago at the Jatidiri Stadium.

== Career statistics ==
=== Club ===
As of 20 September 2024

Club	Season	League			Cup		Continental		Other		Total	
Club	Season	Division	Apps	Goals	Apps	Goals	Apps	Goals	Apps	Goals	Apps	Goals
PSIM Yogyakarta	2016	ISC B	12	1	0	0	–		0	0	12	1
PSIM Yogyakarta	2017	Liga 2	6	0	0	0	–		0	0	6	0
PSIM Yogyakarta	2018	Liga 2	11	0	0	0	–		0	0	11	0
PSIM Yogyakarta	Total		29	1	0	0	–		0	0	29	1
Babel United	2019	Liga 2	1	0	0	0	–		0	0	1	0
Martapura	2020	Liga 2	0	0	0	0	–		0	0	0	0
Barito Putera	2021–22	Liga 1	9	0	0	0	–		4 (Note: Appearances in Menpora Cup)	0	13	0
PSS Sleman	2022–23	Liga 1	19	0	0	0	–		6 (Note: Appearances in Indonesia President's Cup)	1	25	1
PSIS Semarang	2023–24	Liga 1	0	0	0	0	–		0	0	0	0
Bekasi City (loan)	2023–24	Liga 2	4	1	0	0	–		0	0	4	1
Persekat Tegal	2024–25	Liga 2	2	0	0	0	–		0	0	2	0
Career total			64	2	0	0	0	0	10	1	74	3
