= Ryohei Miyazaki =

Japanese footballer

Personal information
- Full name: Ryohei Miyazaki
- Date of birth: 20 September 1995 (age 31)
- Place of birth: Hamamatsu, Japan
- Height: 1.76 m (5 ft 9 in)
- Position: Winger

Youth career
- Hamamatsu City Shinohara SSS
- Hamamatsu Kaiseikan Jr. HS
- Kashima Gakuen HS

Senior career*
Years	Team	Apps	(Gls)
2014	Tsukuba		
2015	Sparta Brodnica	5	(0)
2016	Iwaki		
2017	Shiga City		
2017	Lagend Shiga	11	(0)
2018	San Diego Zest	14	(0)
2020	Melawati	2	(0)
2021	Bačka	2	(0)
2023	Falcons	0	(0)
2023	PSBS Biak	3	(0)
2024	One Taguig		
2025-	North Sunshine Eagles		
- * Club domestic league appearances and goals as of 22 September 2023

Ryohei Miyazaki (Japanese: 宮崎 崚平; born 20 September 1995) is a Japanese professional footballer who plays as a winger for North Sunshine Eagles.

== Career ==
Before the second half of the 2014–15 season, Miyazaki signed for Polish side Sparta Brodnica after playing for Tsukuba in the Japanese Sixth Division.

Before the 2016 season, he joined Japanese Eighth Division club Iwaki.

Before the 2017 season, Miyazaki moved to Shiga City in the Japanese Sixth Division.

In 2017, Miyazaki signed for Japanese Fifth Division team Lagend Shiga.

Before the 2018 season, he joined San Diego Zest in the United States.

Before the 2020 season, Miyazaki moved to Malaysia M3 League club Melawati.

In early 2021, Miyazaki signed for Bačka in the Serbian top flight. On 14 May 2021, he debuted for Bačka during a 0–5 loss to Red Star Belgrade.
