= Wahyudi Hamisi =

Indonesian footballer

Personal information
- Full name: Wahyudi Setiawan Hamisi
- Date of birth: 28 July 1997 (age 29)
- Place of birth: Kotamobagu, Indonesia
- Height: 1.70 m (5 ft 7 in)
- Position: Defensive midfielder

Team information
- Current team: Persita Tangerang
- Number: 33

Youth career
- 2014–2016: Borneo Samarinda

Senior career*
Years	Team	Apps	(Gls)
2016–2023	Borneo Samarinda	93	(3)
2023–2025	PSS Sleman	49	(2)
2025–2026	Persijap Jepara	29	(0)
2026–	Persita Tangerang	7	(0)
- * Club domestic league appearances and goals as of 31 October 2026

Wahyudi Setiawan Hamisi (born 28 July 1997) is an Indonesian professional footballer who plays as a defensive midfielder for Super League club Persita Tangerang.

== Club career ==
=== Borneo Samarinda ===
He was signed for Borneo Samarinda to play in Liga 1 for the 2017 season. Hamisi made his first-team debut on 29 April 2017 in a match against Persegres Gresik United. On 6 August 2018, Hamisi scored his first goal for Borneo against Mitra Kukar in the 8th minute at the Batakan Stadium, Balikpapan.

=== PSS Sleman ===
Hamisi was signed for PSS Sleman to play in Liga 1 in the 2023–24 season. He made his debut on 1 July 2023 in a match against Bali United at the Kapten I Wayan Dipta Stadium, Gianyar.

=== Persijap Jepara ===
On 19 June 2025, Hamisi officially joined Persijap Jepara.

== Career statistics ==
=== Club ===
As of match played 31 October 2026

Club	Season	League		Cup (Note: Includes Piala Indonesia)		Continental		Other (Note: Appearances in Indonesia President's Cup)		Total	
Club	Season	Apps	Goals	Apps	Goals	Apps	Goals	Apps	Goals	Apps	Goals
Borneo Samarinda	2017	19	0	0	0	–		7	0	26	0
Borneo Samarinda	2018	19	1	0	0	–		2	0	21	1
Borneo Samarinda	2019	22	0	4	1	–		3	0	29	1
Borneo Samarinda	2020	1	0	0	0	–		0	0	1	0
Borneo Samarinda	2021–22	21	2	0	0	–		0	0	21	2
Borneo Samarinda	2022–23	11	0	0	0	–		3	0	14	0
Borneo Samarinda	Total	93	3	4	1	–		15	0	112	4
PSS Sleman	2023–24	28	2	0	0	–		0	0	28	2
PSS Sleman	2024–25	21	0	0	0	–		0	0	21	0
PSS Sleman	Total	49	2	0	0	–		0	0	49	2
Persijap Jepara	2025–26	29	0	0	0	–		0	0	29	0
Persita Tangerang	2026–27	7	0	0	0	–		0	0	7	0
Career total		178	5	4	1	0	0	15	0	197	6

== Honours ==
Borneo Samarinda

- Piala Presiden runner-up: 2017, 2022
