= Gian Zola =

Indonesian footballer

Personal information
- Full name: Gian Zola Nasrulloh Nugraha
- Date of birth: 5 August 1998 (age 28)
- Place of birth: Bandung, Indonesia
- Height: 1.65 m (5 ft 5 in)
- Positions: Attacking midfielder; winger

Team information
- Current team: Semen Padang
- Number: 25

Youth career
- 2004–2008: SSB Uni
- 2008–2014: Diklat Persib
- 2014–2017: Persib Bandung

Senior career*
Years	Team	Apps	(Gls)
2016–2022	Persib Bandung	19	(1)
2018	→ Persela Lamongan (loan)	16	(0)
2021	→ Persela Lamongan (loan)	29	(4)
2022–2023	Arema	25	(1)
2023–2024	PSIS Semarang	21	(1)
2024–2025	Persita Tangerang	6	(0)
2025–2026	Barito Putera	12	(0)
2026–	Semen Padang	0	(0)

International career
2017–2019	Indonesia U23	11	(1)
2017	Indonesia	3	(1)
Medal record
Men's football
Representing Indonesia
AFF U-22 Youth Championship
Winner	2019 Cambodia	Team
- * Club domestic league appearances and goals as of 24 January 2026

Gian Zola Nasrulloh Nugraha (born 5 August 1998) is an Indonesian professional footballer who plays as attacking midfielder or winger for Championship club Semen Padang.

== Club career ==
=== Persib Bandung ===
He joined Persib Bandung to play in the 2016 Indonesia Soccer Championship A after signing a four-year contract. Zola made his debut on 15 April 2017 in a match against Arema in the Liga 1. On 20 May 2017, Zola scored his first goal for Persib against Borneo in the 22nd minute at the Gelora Bandung Lautan Api Stadium, Bandung.

=== Persela Lamongan ===
He was loaned to Persela Lamongan in the 2018 Liga 1 season. Zola made his debut on 29 July 2018 in a match against Persipura Jayapura.

=== Arema ===
On 5 April 2022, Zola signed a contract for Arema. Zola made his debut on 24 July 2022 in a match against Borneo Samarinda at Segiri Stadium.

== International career ==
He made his international debut on 21 March 2017 against Myanmar.

Gian scored his first international goal on 8 June 2017 against Cambodia in a friendly match at the Olympic Stadium.

== Personal life ==
The name "Gian Zola" is taken from Chelsea and Italy legend Gianfranco Zola. His brother, Beckham Putra, is also a professional footballer.

== Career statistics ==
=== Club ===
As of 24 January 2026

Club	Season	League			Cup		Continental		Other (Note: Appearances in Piala Presiden)		Total	
Club	Season	Division	Apps	Goals	Apps	Goals	Apps	Goals	Apps	Goals	Apps	Goals
Persib Bandung	2017	Liga 1	14	1	0	0	0	0	0	0	14	1
Persib Bandung	2018	Liga 1	2	0	0	0	0	0	0	0	2	0
Persib Bandung	2019	Liga 1	3	0	0	0	0	0	0	0	3	0
Persib Bandung	2020	Liga 1	0	0	0	0	0	0	0	0	0	0
Persib Bandung	Total		19	1	0	0	0	0	0	0	19	1
Persela Lamongan (loan)	2018	Liga 1	16	0	0	0	0	0	0	0	16	0
Persela Lamongan (loan)	2021–22	Liga 1	29	4	0	0	0	0	0	0	29	4
Arema	2022–23	Liga 1	25	1	0	0	0	0	7	2	32	3
PSIS Semarang	2023–24	Liga 1	21	1	0	0	0	0	0	0	21	1
Persita Tangerang	2024–25	Liga 1	6	0	0	0	0	0	0	0	6	0
Barito Putera	2025–26	Championship	12	0	0	0	0	0	0	0	12	0
Career total			128	7	0	0	0	0	7	2	135	9

=== International ===
As of match played 13 June 2017

Appearances and goals by national team and year
National team	Year	Apps	Goals
Indonesia	2017	3	1
Total		3	1

=== International goals ===
Scores and results list Indonesia's goal tally first.

#	Date	Venue	Opponent	Score	Result	Competition
1.	8 June 2017	Olympic Stadium, Phnom Penh, Cambodia	Cambodia	2–0	2–0	Friendly

== Honours ==
=== Club ===
Arema

- Piala Presiden: 2022

=== International ===
Indonesia U-22

- AFF U-22 Youth Championship: 2019
