= Adilson Maringá =

Brazilian footballer (born 1990)

Personal information
- Full name: Adilson Aguero dos Santos
- Date of birth: 22 August 1990 (age 36)
- Place of birth: Maringá, Brazil
- Height: 1.94 m (6 ft 4 in)
- Position: Goalkeeper

Team information
- Current team: Valletta
- Number: 90

Senior career*
Years	Team	Apps	(Gls)
2012	São Pedro		
2012	Santa Helena		
2012	América–GO		
2013–2014	Rondonópolis		
2014–2015	Formosa		
2016–2017	Gama		
2017	Mogi Mirim	7	(0)
2017–2018	Pinhalnovense	25	(0)
2018–2019	Desportivo das Aves	0	(0)
2018–2019	→ Beira-Mar (loan)	14	(0)
2019–2021	Vilafranquense	32	(0)
2021–2023	Arema	57	(0)
2023–2025	Bali United	65	(0)
2025–	Valletta	32	(0)
- * Club domestic league appearances and goals as of 7 May 2026

Adilson Aguero dos Santos (born 22 August 1990 in Maringá), commonly known as Adilson Maringá, is a Brazilian professional footballer who plays as a goalkeeper for Maltese Premier League club Valletta.

== Club career ==
=== Arema ===
He was signed for Arema to play in Liga 1 in the 2021 season. He made his league debut on 5 September 2021 in a match against PSM Makassar at the Pakansari Stadium, Cibinong.

== Career statistics ==
As of 23 May 2025

Club	Season	League			State League		Cup		Other		Total	
Club	Season	Division	Apps	Goals	Apps	Goals	Apps	Goals	Apps	Goals	Apps	Goals
Santa Helena	2012	Goiano B	—		4	0	—		—		4	0
América–GO	2012	Goiano C	—		12	0	—		—		12	0
Rondonópolis	2013	Matogrossense	—		0	0	—		—		0	0
Rondonópolis	2014	Matogrossense	—		4	0	1	0	—		5	0
Rondonópolis	Subtotal		0	0	4	0	1	0	—		5	0
Formosa	2015	Brasiliense	—		12	0	—		—		12	0
Gama	2016	Brasiliense	—		1	0	6	0	2 (Note: All appearance(s) in Copa Verde)	0	9	0
Mogi Mirim	2017	Série C	7	0	0	0	—		—		7	0
Pinhalnovense	2017–18	Campeonato de Portugal	25	0	0	0	—		—		25	0
Vilafranquense	2019–20	LigaPro	13	0	0	0	—		—		13	0
Vilafranquense	2020–21	Liga Portugal 2	19	0	0	0	—		—		19	0
Vilafranquense	Subtotal		32	0	0	0	0	0	—		32	0
Arema	2021–22	Liga 1	30	0	—		—		—		30	0
Arema	2022–23	Liga 1	27	0	—		—		7 (Note: Appearances in Piala Presiden.)	0	34	0
Arema	Subtotal		57	0	0	0	0	0	7	0	64	0
Bali United	2023–24	Liga 1	37	0	—		—		5	0	42	0
Bali United	2024–25	Liga 1	28	0	—		—		0	0	28	0
Bali United	Subtotal		65	0	0	0	0	0	5	0	70	0
Career total			181	0	33	0	7	0	9	0	240	0

== Honours ==
Beira-Mar

- AF Aveiro Supercup: 2019

Arema

- Piala Presiden: 2022

Individual

- Piala Presiden Best Player: 2022
- Liga 1 Team of the Season: 2023–24
