= Matheus Pato =

Brazilian footballer

Personal information
- Full name: Matheus Antonio Souza dos Santos
- Date of birth: 8 June 1995 (age 31)
- Place of birth: Rio Branco, Brazil
- Height: 1.85 m (6 ft 1 in)
- Position: Forward

Team information
- Current team: Rangers (HKG)
- Number: 12

Youth career
- –2016: Fluminense
- 2013–2014: → Benfica (loan)

Senior career*
Years	Team	Apps	(Gls)
2016–2021	Fluminense	1	(0)
2016	→ Šamorín (loan)	7	(0)
2017	→ Tupi (loan)	15	(3)
2017–2018	→ Šamorín (loan)	10	(15)
2019	→ Cuiabá (loan)	6	(1)
2019	→ Daejeon Hana Citizen (loan)	15	(5)
2021–2022	Daejeon Hana Citizen	27	(3)
2022–2023	Borneo Samarinda	32	(25)
2023–2024	Shandong Taishan	13	(2)
2025	Borneo Samarinda	17	(6)
2025	Port	10	(2)
2026–	Rangers (HKG)	5	(1)
- * Club domestic league appearances and goals as of 21 November 2026

Matheus Antonio Souza dos Santos (born 8 June 1995), commonly known as Matheus Pato, is a Brazilian professional footballer who currently plays as a forward for Hong Kong Premier League club Rangers.

== Club career ==
On 24 September 2026, Pato joined Hong Kong Premier League club Rangers.

== Career statistics ==
=== Club ===
As of match played 7 December 2025

Appearances and goals by club, season and competition
Club	Season	League			State League		Cup		Continental		Other		Total	
Club	Season	Division	Apps	Goals	Apps	Goals	Apps	Goals	Apps	Goals	Apps	Goals	Apps	Goals
Fluminense	2015	Série A	0	0	0	0	0	0	0	0	—		0	0
Fluminense	2016	Série A	0	0	0	0	0	0	0	0	—		0	0
Fluminense	2020	Série A	0	0	1 (Note: Appearances in the Campeonato Carioca)	0	0	0	0	0	—		1	0
Fluminense	Total		0	0	1	0	0	0	0	0	—		1	0
Šamorín (loan)	2016–17	2. Liga	7	0	–		1 (Note: Appearances in the Slovak Cup)	0	—		—		8	0
Tupi (loan)	2017	Série C	4	1	11 (Note: Appearances in the Campeonato Mineiro)	2	0	0	0	0	—		15	3
Šamorín (loan)	2017–18	2. Liga	9	3	—		0	0	—		—		9	3
Šamorín (loan)	2018–19	2. Liga	15	12	—		3	2	—		—		18	14
Šamorín (loan)	Total		35	16	0	0	4	2	0	0	—		50	20
Cuiabá (loan)	2019	Série B	6	1	0	0	1 (Note: Appearances in the Copa do Brasil)	0	0	0	—		7	1
Daejeon Hana Citizen (loan)	2019	K League 2	15	5	—		0	0	—		—		15	5
Daejeon Hana Citizen	2021	K League 2	27	3	—		1	0	—		—		28	3
Borneo Samarinda	2022–23	Liga 1	32	25	—		0	0	—		9 (Note: Appearances in Indonesia President's Cup)	6	41	31
Borneo Samarinda	2023–24	Liga 1	3	3	—		0	0	—		0	0	3	3
Borneo Samarinda	Total		35	28	—		0	0	—		9	6	44	34
Shandong Taishan	2023	Chinese Super League	7	1	—		1	1	2	1	—		10	3
Shandong Taishan	2024	Chinese Super League	6	1	—		0	0	3	0	—		9	1
Shandong Taishan	Total		13	2	—		1	1	5	1	—		19	4
Borneo Samarinda	2024–25	Liga 1	17	6	—		0	0	—		—		17	6
Port	2025–26	Thai League 1	10	2	—		0	0	—		0	0	10	2
Career total			158	63	12	2	7	3	5	1	9	6	191	75

== Honours ==
=== Club ===
==== Port ====
- Piala Presiden: 2025

=== Individual ===
- Piala Presiden Top Goalscorer: 2022
- Liga 1 Top Goalscorer: 2022–23
- Liga 1 Best Goal: 2022–23
- Liga 1 Team of the Season: 2022–23
