= Abel Camará =

Bissau-Guinean footballer

Personal information
- Full name: Abel Issa Camará
- Date of birth: 6 January 1990 (age 36)
- Place of birth: Bissau, Guinea-Bissau
- Height: 1.86 m (6 ft 1 in)
- Position: Forward

Youth career
- 2002–2004: Real Massamá
- 2004–2008: Oeiras
- 2008–2009: Belenenses

Senior career*
Years	Team	Apps	(Gls)
2009–2017	Belenenses	94	(13)
2009–2010	→ Estrela Amadora (loan)	28	(6)
2011–2013	→ Beira-Mar (loan)	30	(5)
2013–2014	→ Petrolul Ploiești (loan)	16	(1)
2015–2016	→ Al Faisaly (loan)	20	(3)
2017–2018	Pafos	13	(1)
2018	Cremonese	6	(1)
2018	Irtysh	13	(1)
2019	Elazığspor	7	(0)
2019–2020	Feirense	12	(0)
2020–2021	Mafra	33	(8)
2021–2022	B-SAD	24	(5)
2022–2023	Arema	22	(4)
2023–2024	Sintrense	20	(1)
2024	Oriental	1	(0)
Total		339	(49)

International career
2011–2012	Portugal U21	10	(3)
2010–2017	Guinea-Bissau	5	(0)
- * Club domestic league appearances and goals

Abel Issa Camará (born 6 January 1990) is a Bissau-Guinean former professional footballer who played as a forward.

== Club career ==
Born in Bissau, Guinea-Bissau, Camará finished his football grooming with Belenenses in Portugal. He made his senior debut in the 2009–10 season, on loan to Lisbon neighbours Estrela da Amadora in the third division.

Camará subsequently returned to Belenenses, going on to be regularly played in the Segunda Liga by manager José Mota. He then went on to serve several loans, making his Primeira Liga debut during that timeframe with Beira-Mar.

Camará's first season in the Portuguese top flight with his main club was 2014–15, when he scored once in 24 games to help his team to the sixth position, which qualified for the UEFA Europa League. After another loan, now at Saudi Arabia's Al Faisaly, he re-joined Belenenses.

On 1 March 2018, Camará moved from the Cypriot First Division with Pafos to Italy with Cremonese. He made his Serie B debut with the latter 16 days later, playing the last minutes of the 1–1 away draw against Brescia.

On the last day of the 2019 January transfer window, Camará signed with Elazığspor from Irtysh Pavlodar, being one of 22 players to join the Turkish club in just two hours. He left on 18 May.

Camará competed in the Portuguese second tier from 2019 to August 2021, with Feirense and Mafra. He returned to the main division early into the latter season, joining B-SAD.

On 1 July 2022, Arema announced the signing of Camará on a two-year contract. He made his Liga 1 (Indonesia) debut on 30 July, playing the entire 2–1 home win over PSIS Semarang. His first goal was scored two weeks later, in the 2–1 away defeat of Bali United.

Camará returned to Portugal in August 2023, on a deal at fourth-division club Sintrense.

== International career ==
On 16 November 2010, Camará played for Guinea-Bissau at the Estádio do Restelo, in a friendly with Cape Verde. Additionally, he appeared in several games for Portugal during the 2013 UEFA European Under-21 Championship qualification campaign.

Camará was selected for the 2017 Africa Cup of Nations by manager Baciro Candé, featuring in three games – starting against Gabon– in an eventual group-stage exit.

== Honours ==
Arema

- Piala Presiden: 2022
