= Eka Febri Yogi Setiawan =

Indonesian footballer

Eka Febri
Personal information
- Full name: Eka Febri Yogi Setiawan
- Date of birth: 29 February 2000 (age 26)
- Place of birth: Tuban, Indonesia
- Height: 1.75 m (5 ft 9 in)
- Position: Defensive midfielder

Team information
- Current team: Persikaba Blora
- Number: 44

Youth career
- Persatu U17
- Jember United U17
- Bumi Wali FC
- 2018: PSIS U19
- 2019: PSIS U20

Senior career*
Years	Team	Apps	(Gls)
2019–2024	PSIS Semarang	36	(2)
2023	→ Persipa Pati (loan)	1	(0)
2025–	Persikaba Blora	4	(0)

International career
2021	Indonesia U23	1	(0)
- * Club domestic league appearances and goals as of 28 January 2026

Eka Febri Yogi Setiawan (born 29 February 2000) is an Indonesian professional footballer who plays as a defensive midfielder for Liga 4 club Persikaba Blora.

== Club career ==
=== PSIS Semarang ===
He was signed for PSIS Semarang to play in Liga 1 in the 2019 season. Eka Febri made his first-team debut on 11 September 2019 in a match against PSM Makassar at the Andi Mattalatta Stadium, Makassar.

== International career ==
In October 2021, Eka Febri was called up to the Indonesia U23 in a friendly match against Tajikistan and Nepal and also prepared for 2022 AFC U-23 Asian Cup qualification in Tajikistan by Shin Tae-yong.

== Career statistics ==
=== Club ===
As of 22 January 2024

Club	Season	League			Cup		Other		Total	
Club	Season	Division	Apps	Goals	Apps	Goals	Apps	Goals	Apps	Goals
PSIS Semarang	2019	Liga 1	12	0	0	0	0	0	12	0
PSIS Semarang	2020	Liga 1	2	0	0	0	0	0	2	0
PSIS Semarang	2021–22	Liga 1	20	2	0	0	4 (Note: Appearances in Menpora Cup.)	0	24	2
PSIS Semarang	2022–23	Liga 1	2	0	0	0	4 (Note: Appearances in Indonesia President's Cup.)	1	6	1
Persipa Pati (loan)	2023–24	Liga 2	1	0	0	0	0	0	1	0
Career total			37	2	0	0	8	1	45	3
