= Muhammad Sihran =

Indonesian association football player

Sihran Amrullah
Personal information
- Full name: Muhammad Sihran Amrullah
- Date of birth: 8 March 1999 (age 27)
- Place of birth: Ternate, Indonesia
- Height: 1.58 m (5 ft 2 in)
- Position: Winger

Team information
- Current team: Garudayaksa
- Number: 99

Youth career
- 2017: Tiga Putra
- 2018–2019: Borneo Samarinda

Senior career*
Years	Team	Apps	(Gls)
2017–2026	Borneo Samarinda	162	(14)
2026–	Garudayaksa	0	(0)
- * Club domestic league appearances and goals as of 23 May 2026

Muhammad Sihran Amrullah (born 8 March 1999), is an Indonesian professional footballer who plays as a winger for Super League club Garudayaksa.

== Club career ==
=== Borneo ===
He was signed for Borneo to play in Liga 1 in the 2017 season. Sihran made his first-team debut on 4 November 2017 in a match against Perseru Serui. He made only one league appearance for Borneo, without scoring, during the 2017 season. In the 2018 Liga 1, he also only appeared once.

On 22 July 2019, he started his match in the new Liga 1 season for Borneo in a 1–1 draw over Badak Lampung. On 1 September 2019, Sihran scored his first goal for Borneo against TIRA-Persikabo in the 14th minute at the Pakansari Stadium, Bogor. He added his second goals of the season on 13 September with one goal against Arema, opening the scoring in a 2–2 draw at Kanjuruhan Stadium. Five days later, Sihran scored equalizer in a 2–1 home win over Madura United. During the 2019 season, he started to get a lot of playing minutes in the Borneo's squad. he contributed with 25 appearances and scored three goals.

In the 2020 season, he only made 2 league appearances for the club against Persipura Jayapura and Persija Jakarta. League officially suspended due to COVID-19 pandemic.

Sihran scored his first goal of the 2021–22 season on 4 September 2021, opening the scoring in an 3–1 home win game against Persebaya Surabaya. On 10 December, he give assists a goals Francisco Torres in Borneo's 1–2 lose over Arema.

Sihran scored his first goal of the 2023–23 season on 24 July 2022, in a home game against Arema. The game ended in a 3–0 victory for Borneo.

He added his second goals of the season on 2 February 2023 with one goal against Arema, scored equalizer in a 1–1 draw at Maguwoharjo Stadium. On 8 March, he scored the opening goal in a 3–0 home win over Persija Jakarta. And this goal was special for him, as it coincided with his birthday. He added his fourth goals of the season four days later with one goal against PSIS Semarang in a 6–1 home win.

== Career statistics ==
=== Club ===
As of match played 23 May 2026

Club	Season	League			Cup		Continental		Other		Total	
Club	Season	Division	Apps	Goals	Apps	Goals	Apps	Goals	Apps	Goals	Apps	Goals
Borneo Samarinda	2017	Liga 1	1	0	0	0	–		0	0	1	0
Borneo Samarinda	2018	Liga 1	1	0	0	0	–		0	0	1	0
Borneo Samarinda	2019	Liga 1	25	3	0	0	–		0	0	25	3
Borneo Samarinda	2020	Liga 1	2	0	0	0	–		0	0	2	0
Borneo Samarinda	2021–22	Liga 1	27	1	0	0	–		3 (Note: Appearances in Menpora Cup)	0	30	1
Borneo Samarinda	2022–23	Liga 1	30	4	0	0	–		8 (Note: Appearances in Indonesia President's Cup)	1	38	5
Borneo Samarinda	2023–24	Liga 1	33	2	0	0	–		0	0	33	2
Borneo Samarinda	2024–25	Liga 1	14	1	0	0	–		3 (Note: Appearances in ASEAN Club Championship)	0	17	1
Borneo Samarinda	2025–26	Super League	29	3	0	0	–		0	0	29	3
Career total			162	14	0	0	0	0	14	1	176	15

== Honours ==
Borneo Samarinda

- Piala Presiden runner-up: 2022, 2024
