= Wahyu Prasetyo =

Indonesian footballer (born 1998)

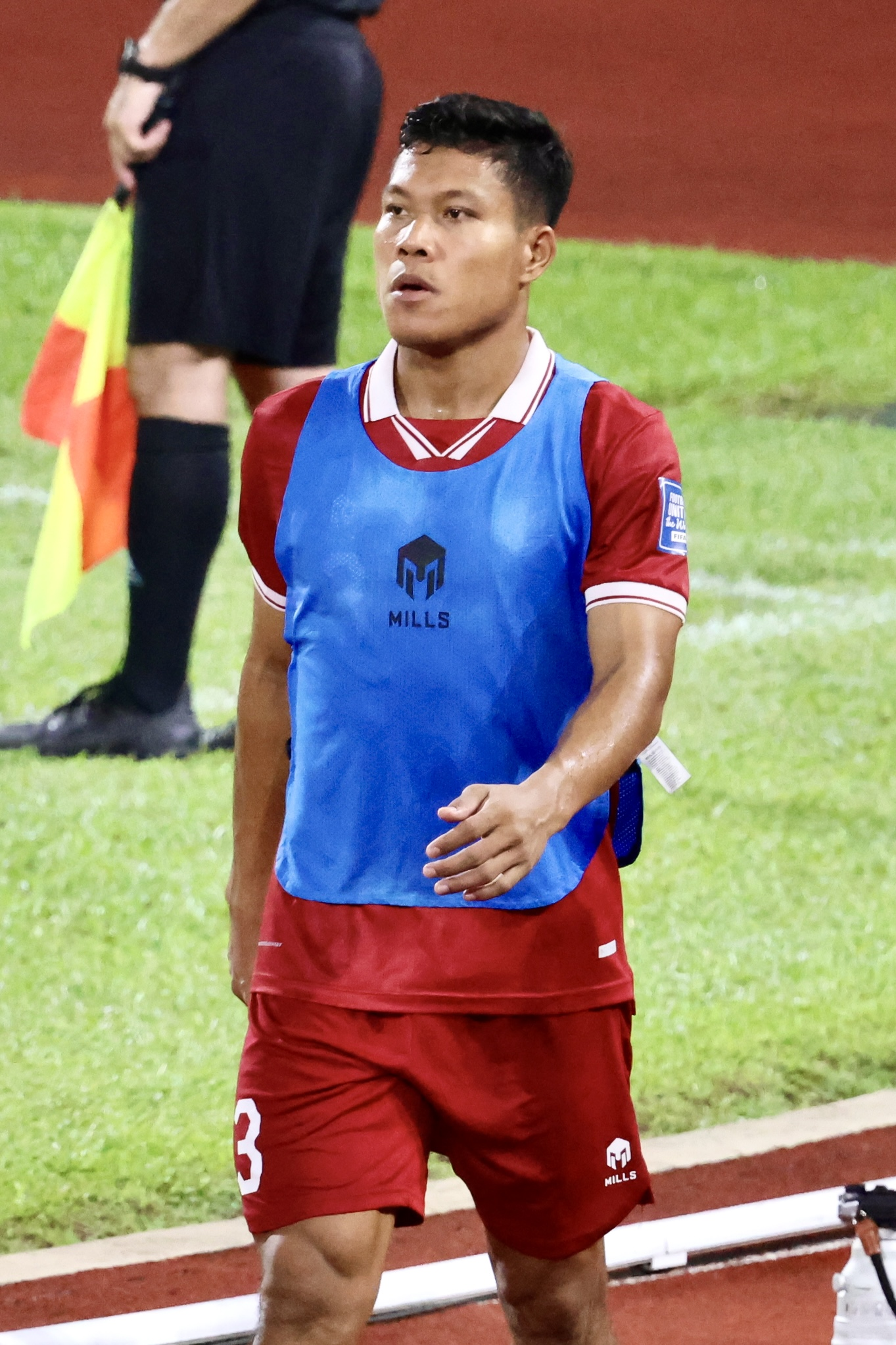
- Wahyu with Indonesia in 2023

Personal information
- Full name: Wahyu Prasetyo
- Date of birth: 21 March 1998 (age 28)
- Place of birth: Batang, Indonesia
- Height: 1.80 m (5 ft 11 in)
- Position: Defender

Team information
- Current team: Garudayaksa
- Number: 5

Youth career
- 2017: Porprov Kabupaten Kendal
- 2017: Puslat Kendal
- Pekalongan U21
- 2019: PON Jawa Tengah

Senior career*
| Years | Team | Apps | (Gls) |
| 2017–2018 | Persik Kendal | 19 | (1) |
| 2019–2020 | Cilegon United | 7 | (0) |
| 2020–2024 | PSIS Semarang | 82 | (0) |
| 2024–2025 | Malut United | 29 | (1) |
| 2025–2026 | Dewa United Banten | 24 | (0) |
| 2026– | Garudayaksa | 6 | (0) |

International career^{‡}
| 2023– | Indonesia | 5 | (0) |
- * Club domestic league appearances and goals as of 7 November 2026 ‡ National team caps and goals as of 7 August 2026

Wahyu Prasetyo (born 21 March 1998), commonly known as Hulk, is an Indonesian professional footballer who plays as a defender for Super League club Garudayaksa and the Indonesia national team.

== Club career ==
=== Persik Kendal ===
Wahyu signed for Persik Kendal in Liga 2 for the 2018 season.

=== Cilegon United ===
In 2019, Wahyu signed a one-year contract with Liga 2 club Cilegon United.

=== PSIS Semarang ===
In 2020, Wahyu signed for Liga 1 club PSIS Semarang. This season was suspended on 27 March 2020 due to the COVID-19 pandemic. The season was abandoned and was declared void on 20 January 2021. In the 2022–23 season, on 20 August 2022, he fell ill with COVID-19, was ill until 20 September 2022, missing 5 League 1 matches. On 27 February 2023, he received a minor injury in training, recovered until 15 March 2023.

=== Malut United ===
On 6 June 2024, Wahyu joined Malut United after his contract at PSIS expired. On 29 June 2025, Wahyu officially left Malut United.

== International career ==
On 28 August 2023, Wahyu received a call-up to the Indonesia national team for a friendly match. He made his international debut on 8 September 2023, against Turkmenistan at the Gelora Bung Tomo Stadium, Surabaya.

On 10 September 2024, Wahyu played against Australia as a substitute in the third round of 2026 FIFA World Cup qualification in a 0–0 draw.

== Career statistics ==
=== Club ===
As of 7 November 2026

| Club | Season | League | | | Cup | | Other | | Total | |
| Club | Season | Division | Apps | Goals | Apps | Goals | Apps | Goals | Apps | Goals |
|---|---|---|---|---|---|---|---|---|---|---|
| Persik Kendal | 2018 | Liga 2 | 19 | 1 | 0 | 0 | — | | 19 | 1 |
| Cilegon United | 2019 | Liga 2 | 7 | 0 | 0 | 0 | — | | 7 | 0 |
| PSIS Semarang | 2020 | Liga 1 | 1 | 0 | — | | — | | 1 | 0 |
| PSIS Semarang | 2021–22 | Liga 1 | 30 | 0 | — | | 3 (Note: Appearances in Menpora Cup.) | 0 | 33 | 0 |
| PSIS Semarang | 2022–23 | Liga 1 | 22 | 0 | — | | 7 (Note: Appearances in Indonesia President's Cup.) | 1 | 29 | 1 |
| PSIS Semarang | 2023–24 | Liga 1 | 29 | 0 | — | | — | | 29 | 0 |
| PSIS Semarang | Total | | 108 | 1 | 0 | 0 | 10 | 1 | 118 | 2 |
| Malut United | 2024–25 | Liga 1 | 29 | 1 | 0 | 0 | — | | 29 | 1 |
| Dewa United Banten | 2025–26 | Super League | 24 | 0 | 0 | 0 | 3 (Note: Appearances in AFC Challenge League.) | 0 | 27 | 0 |
| Garudayaksa | 2026–27 | Super League | 6 | 0 | 0 | 0 | — | | 6 | 0 |
| Career total | | | 167 | 2 | 0 | 0 | 13 | 1 | 180 | 3 |

=== International ===
As of match played 7 August 2026

Appearances and goals by national team and year
| National team | Year | Apps | Goals |
|---|---|---|---|
| Indonesia | 2023 | 1 | 0 |
| Indonesia | 2024 | 2 | 0 |
| Indonesia | 2026 | 2 | 0 |
| Total | | 5 | 0 |
