= Semen Padang F.C. =

Indonesian football club

Semen Padang
- Full name: Semen Padang Football Club
- Nicknames: Kabau Sirah (The Red Buffaloes)
- Short name: SMP
- Founded: 30 November 1980; 45 years ago
- Ground: Gelora Haji Agus Salim Stadium
- Capacity: 11,000
- Owner: PT Kabau Sirah Semen Padang
- President: Andre Rosiade
- Head coach: Stefano Cugurra
- League: Championship
- 2025–26: Super League, 17th of 18 (relegated)
- Website: www.semenpadangfc.co.id
Home colours	Away colours	Third colours

Semen Padang Football Club is an Indonesian professional football club based in Indarung, Padang, West Sumatra. They are currently competing in the Championship next season, following relegation from the 2025–26 Super League.

== History ==
The club was founded on 30 November 1980. It made its debut by participating in Galatama First Division in 1980. In 1982, Semen Padang succeeded in winning the First Division and at the same time was promoted to the Galatama Premier Division.

== Stadium ==
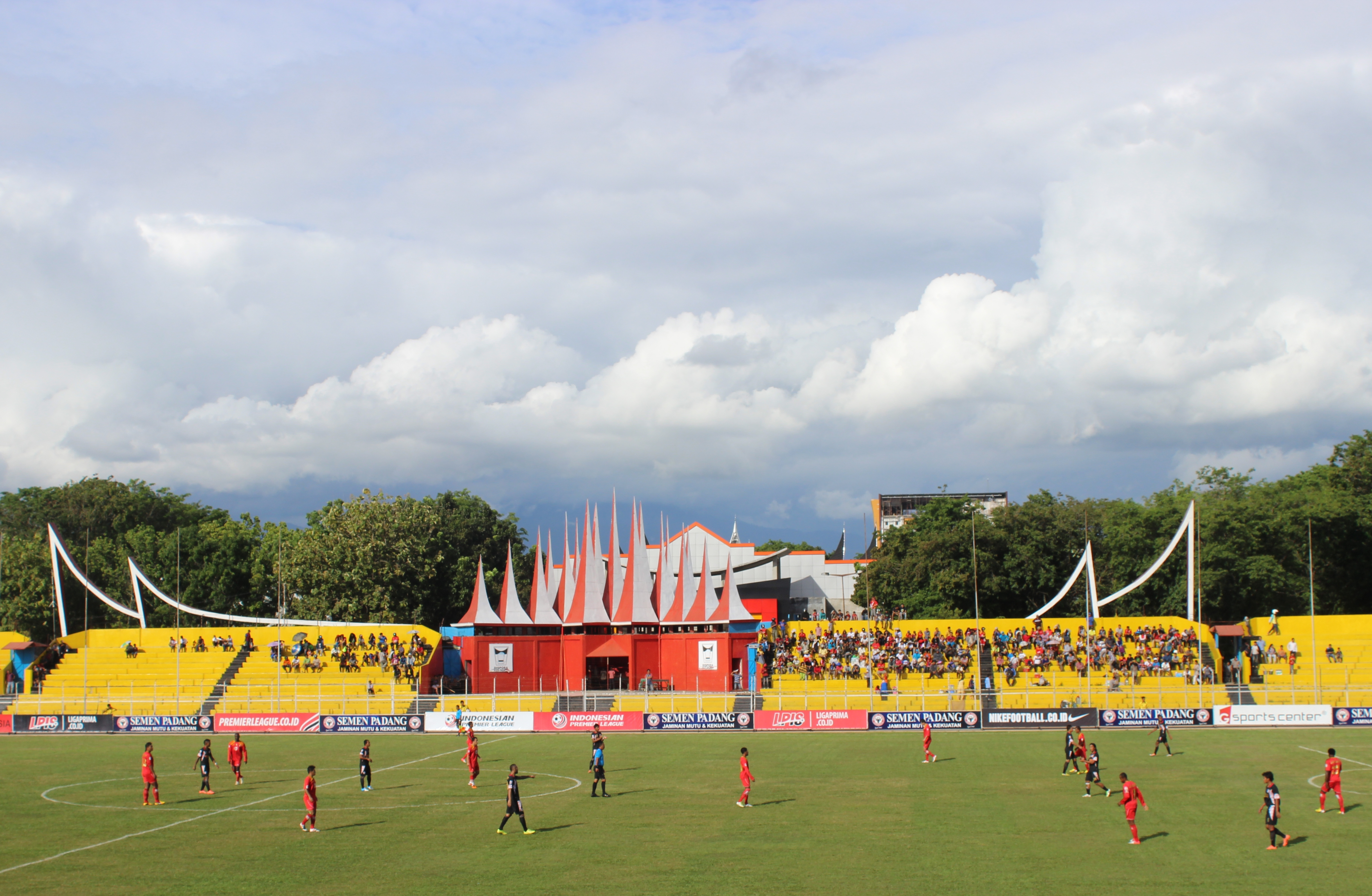
Gelora Haji Agus Salim Stadium, located in Padang's West Padang subdistrict.

Semen Padang plays its home games at the Gelora Haji Agus Salim Stadium which located in Padang, West Sumatra.

== Supporters and rivalries ==
=== Supporters ===
Semen Padang has four main supporters groups, The Kerbau Merah Suporter (Kmers), Spartacs, UWS 1980 and Padang Fans. The Kmers is the oldest group, which was established on 14 November 2001. During Semen Padang matches, they usually occupy the north stands. Spartacs is currently the largest supporters group of the club which was founded on 18 May 2010. They occupy the south stand of the stadium.

=== Rivalries ===
Semen Padang's main rivalry is with the nearby Sriwijaya from Palembang, representing the name and culture of each club's city and province.

== Honours ==
Type	Format	Competition	Titles	Seasons won
Domestic	Galatama/Indonesia Premier League/Indonesia Soccer Championship A/Super League	Top Tier Division	1	2011–12
Domestic	Piala Galatama/Piala Indonesia/I-League Cup	Domestic Cup Competitions	1	1992
Domestic	Indonesian Community Shield	Community Shield	1	2013

=== Semen Padang squad during their championship season 2011–12 Indonesian Premier League ===

Semen Padang During the IPL 2011-12 Championship Season

=== Other Achievements ===
Domestic League Second Tier Division

- Galatama First Division/Championship
  - Runners-up (3): 1982–83, 2018, 2023–24

Domestic Cup Competitions

- Piala Indonesia
  - Runners-up (1): 2012

AFC (Asian competitions)

- Asian Cup Winners' Cup
  - Quarters-finals (1): 1993–94
- AFC Champions League Two/AFC Cup
  - Quarter-finals (1): 2013

== Statistics ==
=== Recent history ===
Note: Only displaying from 2008-09 season since Indonesia Super League (now Liga 1) established

Champions	Runners-up	Third place	Promoted	Relegated

Season	Division	Position	P	W	D	L	GF	GA	Pts	Cup	AFC/AFF competition(s)	
2008–09	PD	7th (Note: Group 1 in First Round.)	28	10	10	8	42	30	40	1st round	–	–
2009–10	PD	3rd (Note: Overall.)	23	13	8	2	37	16	47	1st round	–	–
2010–11	SL	4th	28	12	12	4	41	27	48	–	–	–
2011–12	PL	1st	22	13	7	2	46	21	48	Runners-up	–	–
2013	PL	season not finished									AFC Cup	Quarter Final
2014	SL	3rd (Note: Group A in Second Round.)	26	14	6	6	40	25	48	–	–	–
2015	SL	season not finished									–	–
2016	ISC-A	8th	34	15	7	12	46	34	52	–	–	–
2017	L1	16th	34	9	8	17	34	51	35	–	–	–
2018	L2	2nd (Note: Overall.)	31	16	4	11	44	37	52	Round of 32	–	–
2019	L1	17th	34	7	11	16	32	45	32	–	–	–
2020	L2	season declared void									–	–
2021–22	L2	4th (Note: Group A in First Round.)	10	2	4	4	10	12	10	–	–	–
2022–23	L2	season not finished									–	–
2023–24	L2	2nd (Note: Overall.)	22	11	8	3	32	18	41	–	–	–
2024–25	L1	13th	34	9	9	16	38	60	36	–	–	–
2025–26	SL	17th	34	5	5	24	22	65	20	–	–	–
2026–27	CH	TBD	27	0	0	0	0	0	0	–	–	–

=== Season to season ===
Note: Since Indonesia Super League (now Super League) launch in 2008–09 season, Liga Indonesia Premer Division (now Championship) dropped down to second tier.

Season	Tier	Division	Place	Piala Indonesia
1994–95	1	PD	5th (West Division)	–
1995–96	1	PD	9th (West Division)	–
1996–97	1	PD	7th (West Division)	–
1997–98	1	PD	9th (West Division)	–
1998–99	1	PD	3rd (2R: Group P)	–
1999–2000	1	PD	6th (West Division)	–
2001	1	PD	7th (West Division)	–
2002	1	PD	Semifinal	–
2003	1	PD	8th	–
2004	1	PD	15th	–
2005	1	PD	10th (West Division)	Third Round
2006	1	PD	11th (West Division)	Quarter Final
2007–08	1	PD	16th (West Division)	Second Round
2008–09	2	PD	7th (1R: Group 1)	First Round

Season	Tier	Division	Place	Piala Indonesia
2009–10	2	PD	3rd	First Round
2010–11	1	SL	4th	–
2011–12	1	PL	1st	Runner Up
2013	1	PL	not finished	
2014	1	SL	3rd (2R: Group A)	–
2015	1	SL	not finished	
2016	1	ISC-A	8th	
2017	1	L1	16th	–
2018	2	L2	2nd	Round of 32
2019	1	L1	17th	–
2020	2	L2	declared void	–
2021–22	2	L2	4th (1R: Group A)	–
2022–23	2	L2	not finished	–
2023–24	2	L2	2nd	–
2024–25	1	L1	13th	–
2025–26	1	SL	17th	–
2026–27	2	CH		–

Current league

- 8 seasons in Championship
- 7 seasons in Super League

Defunct league

- 13 seasons in Premier Division (as first tier)
- 2 seasons in IPL
- 1 season in ISC-A

== Performance in AFC competitions ==
Season	Competition	Round	Country	Club	Home	Away
1993–94	Asian Cup Winners' Cup	First round		Bye		
1993–94	Asian Cup Winners' Cup	Second round	(Vietnam)	Cảng Sài Gòn	1–0	1–2
1993–94	Asian Cup Winners' Cup	Quarter-final	(Japan)	Nissan	2–1	0–11
2013	AFC Cup	Group E	(Hong Kong)	Kitchee	3–1	2–1
2013	AFC Cup	Group E	(India)	Churchill Brothers	3–1	2–2
2013	AFC Cup	Group E	(Singapore)	Warriors	3–1	2–0
2013	AFC Cup	Round of 16	(Vietnam)	SHB Đà Nẵng	2–1	—
2013	AFC Cup	Quarter-final	(India)	East Bengal	1–1	0–1

== Club rankings ==
=== World rangking ===
As of 4 August 2024

Current rank	Country	Club	Points
1356	(Nigeria)	Sporting Lagos	1313
1357	(Colombia)	Envigado	1312
1358	(Indonesia)	Semen Padang	1312
1359	(Peru)	UTC	1312
1360	(Iran)	Shahr Khodro	1312

=== AFC ranking ===
As of 4 August 2024

Current rank	Country	Club	Points
137	(Saudi Arabia)	Al Raed	1314
138	(Indonesia)	Persebaya Surabaya	1313
139	(Indonesia)	Semen Padang	1312
140	(Iran)	Shahr Khodro	1312
141	(Iran)	Paykan	1311

== Players ==
=== Current squad ===
As of September 2026

Note: Flags indicate national team as defined under FIFA eligibility rules; some limited exceptions apply. Players may hold more than one non-FIFA nationality.

No.	Pos.	Nation	Player
1	GK	IDN	Mulyadi Rani
2	DF	IDN	Bagas Kaffa
3	DF	IDN	Octovianus Kapisa
4	DF	IDN	Anwar Rifai
5	DF	IDN	Erwin Gutawa
6	FW	IDN	Stefano Lilipaly
7	FW	IDN	Ilham Pratama
8	MF	IDN	Muhammad Hargianto
9	FW	IDN	Ilija Spasojević
10	FW	IDN	Irvan Mofu
11	DF	IDN	Novri Setiawan
12	GK	IDN	Ikram Algiffari
15	MF	IDN	Firman Juliansyah
17	DF	IDN	Nurdiansyah
18	MF	IDN	Muhammad Kemaluddin
19	DF	IDN	Agim Fariansyah
20	DF	IDN	Mierza Firjatullah
22	MF	IDN	Kasim Botan

No.	Pos.	Nation	Player
23	MF	IDN	Esteban Vizcarra
25	MF	IDN	Gian Zola
26	DF	MNE	Igor Ćuković
27	DF	IDN	Safrudin Tahar (Captain)
28	DF	IDN	Rezaldi Hehanussa
30	DF	IDN	Ghifari Azhhari
31	GK	IDN	Dikri Yusron
33	MF	SRB	Lazar Zličić
42	DF	IDN	Andre Pangestu
66	MF	IDN	David Maulana
73	DF	IDN	Zulkifli Lukmansyah (on loan from Persib Bandung)
88	MF	IDN	Muhammad Alwi Slamat
89	GK	IDN	Iqbal Bachtiar
90	MF	IDN	Muhammad Arif Rahman
91	MF	IDN	Rahmat
93	FW	BRA	Júnior Batista
96	MF	BRA	Sávio Roberto
98	FW	IDN	Ari Maring

== Coaching staff ==
As of 14 June 2026

Position	Name
President	(Indonesia) Andre Rosiade
Head coach	(Indonesia) Nilmaizar
Assistant coach	(Indonesia) Hengky Ardiles (Indonesia) Nur Iskandar
Fitness coach	(Indonesia) Dino Sefriyanto (Indonesia) Muhammad Fauzan
Goalkeeper coach	(Indonesia) Erick Ibrahim
Analyst	(Indonesia) Dinar Bayu Aji (Indonesia) Rizki Ananda Putra
