= Segiri Stadium =

Sports venue in Samarinda, Indonesia

Coordinates: 0°29′35″S 117°08′58″E

Segiri Stadium Stadion Segiri
- Interactive map of Segiri Stadium; Stadion Segiri
- Location: Bugis, Samarinda, East Kalimantan
- Capacity: 13,000
- Surface: Grass

Construction
- Opened: 1980
- Renovated: 2023–2024

Tenants
- Putra Samarinda (1989–2014); Borneo Samarinda (2014–)

Segiri Stadium is a multi-use stadium in Samarinda, East Kalimantan, Indonesia. It is currently used mostly for football matches by Borneo Samarinda of the Liga 1. The stadium has a capacity of 13,000 spectators.

== History ==
Borneo FC did some renovations for international matches in 2024. The renovation cost Rp74.58 billion.
