= 2018 Arema F.C. season =

Arema F.C.
2018 season
- President: Rendra Kresna
- Head coach: Joko Susilo (until 14 May); Milan Petrović (from 14 May)
- Stadium: Kanjuruhan Stadium
- Liga 1: 6th
- Piala Indonesia (Note: The result of Piala Indonesia in this season page only for competition progress until second round. Statistics for the round of 32 onward which continued in 2019, would be put in 2019 season.): Advance to round of 32
- Top goalscorer: League: Makan Konaté (13); All: Makan Konaté (15)
- Highest home attendance: 44,912 (vs. Persija, 5 August)
- Lowest home attendance: 2,710 (vs. Madura United, 17 September) (Matches played behind closed doors are not included)
- Average home league attendance: 11,224
Home colours	Away colours	Third colours

The 2018 Arema F.C. season is Arema's 29th competitive season. The club will compete in Indonesia League 1, Piala Indonesia and Indonesia President's Cup. Arema Football Club a professional football club based in Malang, East Java, Indonesia. The season covers the period from 1 January 2018 to 31 December 2018.

On 14 May 2018, with just one wins in the first 8 league games, manager Joko Susilo was sacked. His last game, one days earlier, ended in a 1–1 draw to PSM Makassar. The following day, assistant coach Milan Petrović was appointed as manager until the end of the season.

== Squad information ==

Arema XI Go-Jek Liga 1 2018

=== First team squad ===
Note: Flags indicate national team as defined under FIFA eligibility rules; some limited exceptions apply. Players may hold more than one non-FIFA nationality.

No.	Pos.	Nation	Player
5	DF	IDN	Bagas Adi
8	FW	IDN	Nasir
9	FW	IDN	Ahmad Nur Hardianto
10	MF	MLI	Makan Konaté
11	FW	IDN	Rivaldi Bawuo
12	MF	IDN	Hendro Siswanto
14	MF	IDN	Jayus Hariono
15	FW	IDN	Sunarto
16	FW	IDN	Ridwan Tawainella
18	DF	IDN	Ricky Ohorella
19	MF	IDN	Hanif Sjahbandi
22	DF	IDN	Purwaka Yudhi
23	DF	IDN	Hamka Hamzah (captain)

No.	Pos.	Nation	Player
27	FW	IDN	Dedik Setiawan
28	DF	IDN	Israel Wamiau
30	MF	IDN	Muhammad Rafli
37	DF	IDN	Agil Munawar
39	DF	IDN	Alfin Tuasalamony
41	FW	IDN	Dendi Santoso (vice-captain)
44	DF	BRA	Arthur Cunha
77	FW	IDN	Jefri Kurniawan (on loan from Persija Jakarta)
83	GK	SRB	Srđan Ostojić
86	MF	IDN	Dalmiansyah Matutu
87	DF	IDN	Johan Alfarizi
93	GK	IDN	Utam Rusdiana
96	GK	IDN	Kartika Ajie

== Transfers ==
=== In ===
No.	Pos	Player	Transferred From	Fee	Date	Source
13	MF	(Brazil) Rodrigo Ost dos Santos	(Brazil) Esporte Clube Comercial	Undisclosed	13 December 2017	
37	DF	(Indonesia) Agil Munawar	(Indonesia) PS TIRA	Free	14 December 2017	
96	GK	(Indonesia) Kartika Ajie	(Indonesia) Persiba	Free	26 December 2017	
2	DF	(Indonesia) Mochammad Zaenuri	(Indonesia) Perseru	Free	1 January 2018	
9	FW	(Indonesia) Ahmad Nur Hardianto	(Indonesia) Persela	Free	1 January 2018	
11	FW	(Indonesia) Rivaldi Bawuo	(Indonesia) Kalteng Putera	Free	1 January 2018	
14	MF	(Indonesia) Jayus Hariono	(Indonesia) Persekam Metro	Free	1 January 2018	
18	DF	(Indonesia) Ricky Ohorella	(Indonesia) Borneo	Free	1 January 2018	
99	FW	(Brazil) Thiago Furtuoso	(Indonesia) Madura United	Free	4 January 2018	
16	FW	(Indonesia) Ridwan Tawainella	(Indonesia) PSM	Free	6 January 2018	
7	MF	(Indonesia) Juan Revi	(Indonesia) Persela	Free	10 January 2018	
33	GK	(Indonesia) Joko Ribowo	(Indonesia) Mitra Kukar	Free	10 January 2018	
21	GK	(Indonesia) Reky Rahayu	(Indonesia) Perseru	Free	16 January 2018	
28	DF	(Indonesia) Israel Wamiau	(Indonesia) Persipura	Free	1 March 2018	
10	MF	(Montenegro) Balša Božović	(Montenegro) FK Zeta	Free	6 March 2018	
23	DF	(Indonesia) Hamka Hamzah	(Indonesia) Sriwijaya	Free	13 July 2018	
39	DF	(Indonesia) Alfin Tuasalamony	(Indonesia) Sriwijaya	Free	13 July 2018	
10	MF	(Mali) Makan Konaté	(Indonesia) Sriwijaya	Free	15 July 2018	
83	GK	(Serbia) Srđan Ostojić	(Serbia) FK Zemun	Free	17 July 2018	
15	FW	(Indonesia) Sunarto	(Indonesia) Persis	Free	8 August 2018	

=== Out ===
No.	Pos	Player	Transferred To	Fee	Date	Source
7	DF	(Indonesia) Benny Wahyudi	(Indonesia) Madura United	Free	1 December 2017	
11	FW	(Argentina) Esteban Vizcarra	(Indonesia) Sriwijaya	Free	4 December 2017	
18	MF	(Indonesia) Adam Alis	(Indonesia) Sriwijaya	Free	5 December 2017	
94	MF	(Indonesia) Feri Aman Saragih	(Indonesia) Kalteng Putra	Free	6 December 2017	
14	FW	(Indonesia) Arif Suyono	(Indonesia) Mitra Kukar	Free	20 December 2017	
17	MF	(Indonesia) Dio Permana	(Indonesia) Persela	Free	20 December 2017	
13	DF	(Indonesia) Marco Kabiay	(Indonesia) Persija	Free	24 December 2017	
19	MF	(Indonesia) Ahmad Bustomi	(Indonesia) Mitra Kukar	Free	1 January 2018	
20	FW	(Colombia) Juan Pablo Pino	Free agent	Undisclosed	1 January 2018	
33	GK	(Indonesia) Dwi Kuswanto	(Indonesia) Persela	Free	1 January 2018	
10	FW	(Indonesia) Cristian Gonzáles	(Indonesia) Madura United	Undisclosed	18 January 2018	
21	GK	(Indonesia) Reky Rahayu	(Indonesia) Persebaya	Free	21 March 2018	
4	MF	(Indonesia) Syaiful Indra Cahya	(Indonesia) Bali United	Free	13 July 2018	
91	GK	(Indonesia) Teddy Heri Setiawan	(Indonesia) Martapura	Free	13 July 2018	
33	GK	(Indonesia) Joko Ribowo	(Indonesia) PSIS	Free	18 July 2018	
90	MF	(Turkmenistan) Ahmet Atayew	(Indonesia) Persela	Free	26 July 2018	
2	DF	(Indonesia) Mochammad Zaenuri	(Indonesia) Persela	Free	28 July 2018	
10	MF	(Montenegro) Balša Božović	(Montenegro) FK Mornar	Free	31 July 2018	
31	DF	(Indonesia) Junda Irawan	(Indonesia) Madura United	Free	1 August 2018	
99	FW	(Brazil) Thiago Furtuoso	(Oman) Al-Nahda Club	Free	14 September 2018	

=== Loan In ===
No.	Pos	Player	Loaned From	Start	End	Source
77	FW	(Indonesia) Jefri Kurniawan	(Indonesia) Persija	9 December 2017	31 December 2018	

=== Loan Out ===
No.	Pos	Player	Loaned to	Start	End	Source
7	MF	(Indonesia) Juan Revi	(Indonesia) Semen Padang	19 October 2018	31 December 2018	

== Pre-seasons and friendlies ==
=== Friendlies ===
Date	Opponents	H / A	Result F–A	Scorers	Attendance
4 January 2018	PSIS	H	5–3	Ataýew 20' (pen.), Dedik 38', Rodrigo 42', Arthur 60', Hardianto 72'	
7 January 2018	PSIS	A	1–0	Hendro 24'	
14 January 2018	Barito Putera	H	2–0	Alfarizi 62', Rafli 73'	
18 March 2018	Persib	A	1–2	Dendi 56'	
3 June 2018	Sumbersari	H	0–2		0
30 June 2018	Kodam V Brawijaya	N	12–1	Dedik (4), Bawuo (2), Jefri, Dendi, Ridwan, Alfarizi, Hardianto	0
1 September 2018	Perseru	H	4–0	Dedik (2), Dendi, Hardianto	0
29 September 2018	Madura United	H	1–1	Dendi 50'	42,230

=== Indonesia President's Cup ===
==== Group stage ====
Date	Opponents	H / A	Result F–A	Scorers	Attendance	Group position
20 January 2018	Persela	H	2–2	Furtuoso 2', Dendi 12'	19,930	2nd
25 January 2018	PSIS	H	3–1	Rio 4' (o.g.), Alfarizi 8', Furtuoso 47'	8,093	1st
30 January 2018	Bhayangkara	H	0–0		20,879	1st

Pos	Team	Pld	W	D	L	GF	GA	GD	Pts	Qualification
1	Arema (H)	3	1	2	0	5	3	+2	5	Advance to quarter-finals
2	Bhayangkara	3	1	2	0	2	1	+1	5	
3	PSIS	3	1	0	2	2	4	−2	3	
4	Persela	3	0	2	1	3	4	−1	2	

Source: Piala Presiden 2018
Rules for classification: 1) Points; 2) Goal difference; 3) Goals scored; 4) Head-to-head; 5) Drawing.
(H) Hosts

==== Knockout phase ====
Date	Round	Opponents	H / A	Result F–A	Scorers	Attendance
4 February 2018	Quarter-finals	Sriwijaya	N	1–3	Hardianto 80' (pen.)	18,450

=== East Kalimantan Governor Cup ===
==== Group stage ====
Date	Opponents	H / A	Result F–A	Scorers	Attendance	Group position
23 February 2018	PSIS	N	2–2 (3–4p)	Dedik 5', Arthur 89'		3rd
25 February 2018	Borneo	A	1–2	Dendi 73'		4th
27 February 2018	Mitra Kukar	N	3–1	Božović 26', Dendi 56', Dedik 86'		2nd

Pos	Team	Pld	W	D	L	GF	GA	GD	Pts	Qualification
1	Borneo (Note: Borneo won in penalty shoot-out against Mitra Kukar. (+1 point))	3	2	1	0	4	2	+2	8	Knockout stage
2	Arema	3	1	1	1	6	5	+1	4	Knockout stage
3	Mitra Kukar	3	1	1	1	4	4	0	4	
4	PSIS (Note: PSIS won in penalty shoot-out against Arema. (+1 point))	3	0	1	2	4	7	−3	2	

Updated to match(es) played on 27 February 2018. Source:

==== Knockout phase ====
Date	Round	Opponents	H / A	Result F–A	Scorers	Attendance
2 March 2018	Semi-finals	Persebaya	N	2–0	Furtuoso 65', Hanif 85'	
4 March 2018	Final	Sriwijaya	N	2–3	Božović 23', Furtuoso 81' (pen.)	

== Match results ==
=== Liga 1 ===
==== Matches ====
Date	Opponents	H / A	Result F–A	Scorers	Attendance	League position
24 March 2018	Mitra Kukar	H	2–2	Božović 8', Syaiful 19'	12,400	6th
31 March 2018	Persija	A	1–3	Ataýew 35'	62,273	13th
9 April 2018	Borneo	A	1–2	Furtuoso 35'	10,329	17th
15 April 2018	Persib	H	2–2	Furtuoso 19', Božović 87'	31,000	18th
21 April 2018	Madura United	A	2–3	Dendi 45', Furtuoso 66' (pen.)	9,825	18th
27 April 2018	Persipura	H	3–1	Rivaldi 45', Dedik (2) 47', 71'	3,025	17th
6 May 2018	Persebaya	A	0–1		50,000	18th
13 May 2018	PSM	H	1–1	Furtuoso 77'	6,154	18th
18 May 2018	Bali United	A	0–1		16,095	18th
22 May 2018	Bhayangkara	H	4–0	Rivaldi (2) 9', 47', Dedik (2) 24', 62'	3,394	17th
26 May 2018	PSMS	A	0–2		13,042	18th
1 June 2018	PSIS	H	1–0	Dedik 37'	8,588	17th
6 June 2018	Perseru	A	1–0	Furtuoso 55' (pen.)	8,203	15th
7 July 2018	Persela	H	1–0	Dedik 74'	17,232	12th
11 July 2018	Barito Putera	A	0–0		6,827	13th
15 July 2018	PS TIRA	H	2–2	Rivaldi 40', Alfarizi 70'	10,639	13th
21 July 2018	Sriwijaya	A	3–0	Ridwan 51', Rivaldi 65', Hardianto 77'	5,157	10th
27 July 2018	Mitra Kukar	A	3–4	Konaté 33' (pen.), Dedik 40', Arthur 82'	2,853	13th
5 August 2018	Persija	H	1–1	Konaté 90'	44,912	13th
11 August 2018	Borneo	H	2–2	Konaté (2) 53' (pen.), 70'	23,157	14th
13 September 2018	Persib	A	0–2		33,719	14th
17 September 2018	Madura United	H	2–0	Konaté 45+5' (pen.), Dedik 90'	2,710	12th
22 September 2018	Persipura	A	0–1		10,036	13th
6 October 2018	Persebaya	H	1–0	Hardianto 70'	26,293	11th
14 October 2018	PSM	A	1–2	Hardianto 61'	14,112	11th
20 October 2018	Bali United	H	3–1	Hanif (2) 13', 43', Konaté 67'	0 (Note: Arema has been sanctioned with home matches being played without spectators until the end of the season following a decision by the PSSI Disciplinary Committee.)	10th
24 October 2018	Bhayangkara	A	0–0		1,623	12th
28 October 2018	PSMS	H	5–0	Dedik 8', Konaté (2) 12', 39', Dendi 23', Hardianto 80'	0	8th
4 November 2018	PSIS	A	1–2	Dendi 72'	19,825	11th
11 November 2018	Perseru	H	4–1	Konaté (2) 13', 56', Dendi 28', Sunarto 49'	0	9th
16 November 2018	Persela	A	0–4		14,346	12th
24 November 2018	Barito Putera	H	3–1	Sunarto 29', Konaté 41', Hardianto 89' (pen.)	0	9th
2 December 2018	PS TIRA	A	1–0	Konaté 72'	1,217	7th
9 December 2018	Sriwijaya	H	2–1	Konaté 63' (pen.), Dedik 83'	0	6th

==== League table ====
Locations of the 2018 Liga 1 teams

Pos	Team	Pld	W	D	L	GF	GA	GD	Pts
4	Persib	34	14	10	10	49	41	+8	52
5	Persebaya	34	14	8	12	60	48	+12	50 (Note: Head-to-head results: Persebaya 1–0 Arema; Arema 1–0 Persebaya)
6	Arema	34	14	8	12	53	42	+11	50
7	Borneo	34	14	6	14	50	49	+1	48 (Note: Head-to-head results: Madura United 1–2 Borneo, Borneo 2–2 Madura United)
8	Madura United	34	13	9	12	47	50	−3	48

Source: Go-Jek Liga 1, Soccerway
Rules for classification: 1) Points; 2) Head-to-head; 3) Goal difference; 4) Goals scored; 5) Drawing.

=== Piala Indonesia ===
Date	Round	Opponents	H / A	Result F–A	Scorers	Attendance
9 May 2018	First Round	PSBK	A	2–0	Dedik (2) 29', 40'	
20 November 2018	Second Round	Persekam Metro	A	5–1	Sunarto 9', Nasir 14', Konaté (2) 29', 88', Alfarizi 32'	

== Statistics ==
=== Squad appearances and goals ===
No.	Pos	Nat	Player	Total		Liga 1		Piala Indonesia	
No.	Pos	Nat	Player	Apps	Goals	Apps	Goals	Apps	Goals
Goalkeepers
83	GK	(Serbia) SRB	Srđan Ostojić	5	0	4	0	1	0
93	GK	(Indonesia) IDN	Utam Rusdiana	17	0	17	0	0	0
96	GK	(Indonesia) IDN	Kartika Ajie	3	0	2	0	1	0
Defenders
5	DF	(Indonesia) IDN	Bagas Adi	13	0	11+1	0	1	0
18	DF	(Indonesia) IDN	Ricky Ohorella	16	0	10+4	0	2	0
22	DF	(Indonesia) IDN	Purwaka Yudhi	16	0	14+1	0	1	0
23	DF	(Indonesia) IDN	Hamka Hamzah	20	0	19	0	1	0
28	DF	(Indonesia) IDN	Israel Wamiau	12	0	9+3	0	0	0
37	DF	(Indonesia) IDN	Agil Munawar	2	0	0+2	0	0	0
39	DF	(Indonesia) IDN	Alfin Tuasalamony	16	0	16	0	0	0
44	DF	(Brazil) BRA	Arthur Cunha	30	1	29	1	0+1	0
87	DF	(Indonesia) IDN	Johan Alfarizi	32	2	31	1	1	1
Midfielders
10	MF	(Mali) MLI	Makan Konaté	19	15	18	13	1	2
12	MF	(Indonesia) IDN	Hendro Siswanto	29	0	26+2	0	0+1	0
14	MF	(Indonesia) IDN	Jayus Hariono	11	0	9+1	0	1	0
19	MF	(Indonesia) IDN	Hanif Sjahbandi	20	2	18+1	2	1	0
30	MF	(Indonesia) IDN	Muhammad Rafli	20	0	6+13	0	1	0
86	MF	(Indonesia) IDN	Dalmiansyah Matutu	1	0	0	0	0+1	0
Forwards
8	FW	(Indonesia) IDN	Nasir	7	1	4+2	0	1	1
9	FW	(Indonesia) IDN	Ahmad Nur Hardianto	16	5	3+12	5	0+1	0
11	FW	(Indonesia) IDN	Rivaldi Bawuo	24	5	18+6	5	0	0
15	FW	(Indonesia) IDN	Sunarto	9	3	3+5	2	1	1
16	FW	(Indonesia) IDN	Ridwan Tawainella	18	1	4+13	1	1	0
27	FW	(Indonesia) IDN	Dedik Setiawan	27	12	21+5	10	1	2
41	FW	(Indonesia) IDN	Dendi Santoso	32	4	30+1	4	1	0
77	FW	(Indonesia) IDN	Jefri Kurniawan	10	0	9	0	1	0
Players transferred or loaned out during the season the club
2	DF	(Indonesia) IDN	Mochammad Zaenuri	3	0	2	0	1	0
4	DF	(Indonesia) IDN	Syaiful Indra Cahya	10	1	8+2	1	0	0
7	MF	(Indonesia) IDN	Juan Revi	2	0	0+2	0	0	0
10	MF	(Montenegro) MNE	Balša Božović	10	2	5+4	2	1	0
31	DF	(Indonesia) IDN	Junda Irawan	1	0	0	0	1	0
33	GK	(Indonesia) IDN	Joko Ribowo	10	0	10	0	0	0
90	MF	(Turkmenistan) TKM	Ahmet Ataýew	12	1	10+1	1	1	0
91	GK	(Indonesia) IDN	Teddy Heri Setiawan	0	0	0	0	0	0
99	FW	(Brazil) BRA	Thiago Furtuoso	12	5	8+3	5	0+1	0

=== Top scorers ===
The list is sorted by shirt number when total goals are equal.

Rnk	Pos	No.	Player	Liga 1	Piala Indonesia	Total
1	MF	10	(Mali) Makan Konaté	13	2	15
2	FW	27	(Indonesia) Dedik Setiawan	10	2	12
3	FW	9	(Indonesia) Ahmad Nur Hardianto	5	0	5
3	FW	11	(Indonesia) Rivaldi Bawuo	5	0	5
3	FW	99	(Brazil) Thiago Furtuoso	5	0	5
6	FW	41	(Indonesia) Dendi Santoso	4	0	4
7	FW	15	(Indonesia) Sunarto	2	1	3
8	MF	19	(Indonesia) Hanif Sjahbandi	2	0	2
8	DF	87	(Indonesia) Johan Alfarizi	1	1	2
8	MF	10	(Montenegro) Balša Božović	2	0	2
11	FW	8	(Indonesia) Nasir	0	1	1
11	FW	16	(Indonesia) Ridwan Tawainella	1	0	1
11	DF	44	(Brazil) Arthur Cunha	1	0	1
11	DF	4	(Indonesia) Syaiful Indra Cahya	1	0	1
11	MF	90	(Turkmenistan) Ahmet Ataýew	1	0	1
Total				51	7	58
