= 2019 Arema F.C. season =

Arema F.C.
2019 season
- CEO: Agoes Soerjanto
- Head coach: Milomir Šešlija
- Stadium: Kanjuruhan Stadium; Gajayana Stadium (only 28 June and 4 July)
- Liga 1: 9th
- Piala Indonesia (Note: The result of Piala Indonesia in this season page only for competition progress from the round of 32. Statistics for the first two round which played last year, were put in 2018 season.): Round of 16
- Top goalscorer: League: Makan Konaté (16); All: Makan Konaté (18)
- Highest home attendance: 40,412 (vs. Persija, 23 November)
- Lowest home attendance: 4,318 (vs. Bali United, 16 December)
- Average home league attendance: 14,182
| Home colours | Away colours |

The 2019 Arema F.C. season is Arema's 30th competitive season. The club will compete in Indonesia League 1, Piala Indonesia and Indonesia President's Cup. Arema Football Club a professional football club based in Malang, East Java, Indonesia. The season covers the period from 1 January 2019 to 31 December 2019.

== Squad information ==

Arema XI Shopee Liga 1 2019

=== First team squad ===
Note: Flags indicate national team as defined under FIFA eligibility rules; some limited exceptions apply. Players may hold more than one non-FIFA nationality.

| No. | Pos. | Nation | Player |
|---|---|---|---|
| 6 | DF | IDN | Ikhfanul Alam |
| 7 | FW | IDN | Ahmad Nur Hardianto |
| 8 | DF | IDN | Nasir |
| 10 | MF | MLI | Makan Konaté |
| 11 | FW | IDN | Rivaldi Bawuo |
| 12 | MF | IDN | Hendro Siswanto |
| 14 | MF | IDN | Jayus Hariono |
| 15 | FW | IDN | Sunarto |
| 16 | FW | IDN | Ridwan Tawainella |
| 17 | FW | IDN | Zidane Pulanda |
| 18 | DF | IDN | Ricky Ohorella |
| 19 | MF | IDN | Hanif Sjahbandi |
| 21 | FW | IDN | Ricky Kayame |
| 22 | DF | IDN | Rachmat Latief |
| 23 | DF | IDN | Hamka Hamzah (captain) |

| No. | Pos. | Nation | Player |
|---|---|---|---|
| 27 | FW | IDN | Dedik Setiawan |
| 30 | MF | IDN | Muhammad Rafli |
| 31 | GK | IDN | Andriyas Francisco |
| 32 | DF | IDN | Alfin Tuasalamony |
| 37 | DF | IDN | Agil Munawar |
| 41 | FW | IDN | Dendi Santoso |
| 44 | DF | BRA | Arthur Cunha (vice-captain) |
| 56 | FW | IDN | Titan Agung |
| 77 | MF | JPN | Takafumi Akahoshi |
| 86 | GK | IDN | Sandy Firmansyah |
| 87 | DF | IDN | Johan Alfarizi |
| 88 | MF | IDN | Vikrian Akbar |
| 93 | GK | IDN | Utam Rusdiana |
| 96 | GK | IDN | Kartika Ajie |
| 99 | FW | NED | Sylvano Comvalius |

== Transfers ==
=== In ===
| No. | Pos | Player | Transferred From | Fee | Date | Source |
|---|---|---|---|---|---|---|
| 86 | GK | (Indonesia) Sandy Firmansyah | (Indonesia) Sriwijaya | Free | 1 January 2019 | |
| 6 | DF | (Indonesia) Ikhfanul Alam | (Indonesia) PSIR | Free | 10 January 2019 | |
| 9 (7) | FW | (Brazil) Robert Gladiador | (Kuwait) Al-Shabab | Free | 10 January 2019 | |
| 91 | MF | (Uzbekistan) Pavel Smolyachenko | (Uzbekistan) Metallurg Bekabad | Undisclosed | 10 January 2019 | |
| 22 | DF | (Indonesia) Rachmat Latief | (Indonesia) Borneo | Free | 11 January 2019 | |
| 21 | FW | (Indonesia) Ricky Kayame | (Indonesia) Persebaya | Free | 26 February 2019 | |
| 99 | FW | (Netherlands) Sylvano Comvalius | (Malaysia) Kuala Lumpur | Undisclosed | 24 April 2019 | |
| 31 | GK | (Indonesia) Andriyas Francisco | Youth sector | Promoted | 4 May 2019 | |
| 56 | FW | (Indonesia) Titan Agung | Youth sector | Promoted | 4 May 2019 | |
| 17 | FW | (Indonesia) Zidane Pulanda | (Indonesia) Persipura | Free | 6 May 2019 | |
| 88 | MF | (Indonesia) Vikrian Akbar | Youth sector | Promoted | 1 August 2019 | |
| 77 | MF | (Japan) Takafumi Akahoshi | (Iran) Foolad | Free | 24 August 2019 | |

=== Out ===
| No. | Pos | Player | Transferred To | Fee | Date | Source |
|---|---|---|---|---|---|---|
| 83 | GK | (Serbia) Srđan Ostojić | (Serbia) FK Zemun | Undisclosed | 12 December 2018 | |
| 28 | DF | (Indonesia) Israel Wamiau | (Indonesia) Persipura | Free | 12 December 2018 | |
| 22 | DF | (Indonesia) Purwaka Yudhi | (Indonesia) PSS | Free | 12 December 2018 | |
| 7 | MF | (Indonesia) Juan Revi | (Indonesia) Sriwijaya | Free | 1 January 2019 | |
| 5 | DF | (Indonesia) Bagas Adi | (Indonesia) Bhayangkara | Free | 9 January 2019 | |
| 86 | MF | (Indonesia) Dalmiansyah Matutu | (Indonesia) Badak Lampung | Free | 26 February 2019 | |
| 9 (7) | FW | (Brazil) Robert Gladiador | Free agent | Released | 15 April 2019 | |
| 91 | MF | (Uzbekistan) Pavel Smolyachenko | Free agent | Released | 20 August 2019 | |

== Pre-seasons and friendlies ==
=== Friendlies ===
| Date | Opponents | H / A | Result F–A | Scorers | Attendance |
|---|---|---|---|---|---|
| 18 January 2019 | Tanobel | H | 7–0 | Gladiador (2) 10', 44', Dedik 12', Rivaldi (2) 46', 86', Hardianto 79' | 5,000 |
| 10 February 2019 | Indonesia U22s | H | 1–1 | Gladiador 86' | 35,000 |
| 29 April 2019 | Singhasari | H | 13–0 | Kayame (2), Dedik (3), Latief, Dodik (o.g.), Konaté (2), Rivaldi, Nasir, Hanif, Hamka | 0 |
| 4 May 2019 | PSIS | H | 1–0 | Alfarizi 6' | |
| 11 May 2019 | PSIS | A | 0–2 | | |
| 16 June 2019 | Arema U20s | H | 8–2 | Konaté (2), Dendi, Pavel, Rivaldi (2), Hardianto, Jayus | 0 |
| 18 July 2019 | Persekam Metro | H | 4–0 | | 0 |

=== Indonesia President's Cup ===
==== Group stage ====
| Date | Opponents | H / A | Result F–A | Scorers | Attendance | Group position |
|---|---|---|---|---|---|---|
| 4 March 2019 | Barito Putera | H | 3–2 | Dedik (2) 78', 90+5', Hardianto 90+1' | 6,879 | 2nd |
| 9 March 2019 | Persela | H | 0–1 | | 28,311 | 2nd |
| 13 March 2019 | Persita | H | 6–1 | Konaté 33', Ohorella 45+1', Hendro 62', Arthur 67', Hamka 73', Kayame 90+1' | 8,245 | 2nd |

| Pos | Team | Pld | W | D | L | GF | GA | GD | Pts | Qualification |
|---|---|---|---|---|---|---|---|---|---|---|
| 1 | Persela | 3 | 2 | 1 | 0 | 4 | 1 | +3 | 7 | Knockout stage |
| 2 | Arema (H) | 3 | 2 | 0 | 1 | 9 | 4 | +5 | 6 | Knockout stage |
| 3 | Barito Putera | 3 | 1 | 1 | 1 | 6 | 5 | +1 | 4 | |
| 4 | Persita | 3 | 0 | 0 | 3 | 2 | 11 | −9 | 0 | |

Source: Piala Presiden
Rules for classification: 1) Points; 2) Head-to-head; 3) Goal difference; 4) Goal scored.
(H) Hosts

==== Knockout phase ====
| Date | Round | Opponents | H / A | Result F–A | Scorers | Attendance |
|---|---|---|---|---|---|---|
| 30 March 2019 | Quarter-finals | Bhayangkara | A | 4–0 | Konaté (2) 10', 78', Hamka 40', Kayame 90+4' | 8,518 |
| 2 April 2019 | Semi-finals; First leg | Kalteng Putra | H | 3–0 | Kayame 28', Hanif 61', Dedik 67' | 29,285 |
| 5 April 2019 | Semi-finals; Second leg | Kalteng Putra | A | 3–0 | Dedik 10', Alfarizi 20', Kayame 40' | 7,987 |
| 9 April 2019 | Finals; First leg | Persebaya | A | 2–2 | Hendro 33', Konaté 79' | 50,000 |
| 12 April 2019 | Finals; Second leg | Persebaya | H | 2–0 | Hardianto 43', Kayame 90+2' | 42,000 |

== Match results ==
=== Liga 1 ===
==== Matches ====
| Date | Opponents | H / A | Result F–A | Scorers | Attendance | League position |
|---|---|---|---|---|---|---|
| 15 May 2019 | PSS | A | 1–3 | Comvalius 29' | 27,710 | 15th |
| 22 May 2019 | Borneo | A | 0–2 | | 5,648 | 17th |
| 27 May 2019 | Persela | H | 3–2 | Dendi 12', Dedik (2) 27', 30' | 13,763 | 11th |
| 29 June 2019 | TIRA-Persikabo | H | 1–2 | Konaté 79' | 16,670 | 15th |
| 4 July 2019 | Persipura | H | 3–1 | Konaté 7', Dedik (2) 21', 63' | 11,890 | 12th |
| 12 July 2019 | Semen Padang | A | 1–0 | Dedik 39' | 5,200 | 10th |
| 16 July 2019 | Badak Lampung | H | 4–1 | Konaté (3) 7', 24, 78', Comvalius 71' | 7,510 | 10th |
| 20 July 2019 | Madura United | A | 0–1 | | 5,136 | 11th |
| 26 July 2019 | Bhayangkara | H | 3–2 | Dedik 12', Comvalius 45', Konaté 59' | 5,234 | 5th |
| 30 July 2019 (Note: The Liga 1 match home to Persib, originally scheduled for 14 June 2019, was postponed due to the time is close to the agenda of the Indonesian national team which will play two FIFA Matchday matches against Jordan and Vanuatu, on 11 and 15 June 2019.) | Persib | H | 5–1 | Dendi 4', Konaté 5', Arthur 40', Rivaldi (2) 68', 90' | 31,599 | 4th |
| 3 August 2019 | Persija | A | 2–2 | Hanif 8', Hardianto 90+5' | 51,230 | 4th |
| 7 August 2019 | Kalteng Putra | A | 2–4 | Hardianto 37', Konaté 82' | 4,576 | 6th |
| 15 August 2019 | Persebaya | H | 4–0 | Dendi 30', Arthur 71', Comvalius 87', Konaté 90+2' | 37,406 | 4th |
| 19 August 2019 | Barito Putera | H | 2–1 | Hamka 24', Kayame 60' | 5,652 | 3rd |
| 24 August 2019 | Bali United | A | 1–2 | Konaté 44' | 21,597 | 4th |
| 31 August 2019 | PSIS | H | 1–1 | Hamka 16' | 15,528 | 4th |
| 13 September 2019 | Borneo | H | 2–2 | Kayame (2) 40', 42' | 8,578 | 5th |
| 20 September 2019 | Persela | A | 0–2 | | 12,938 | 7th |
| 24 September 2019 | PSS | H | 4–0 | Konaté 30' (pen.), Ridwan 38', Rivaldi 58', Hanif 67' | 17,493 | 4th |
| 2 October 2019 | PSM | H | 2–0 | Comvalius 46', Rafli 72' | 7,729 | 4th |
| 16 October 2019 (Note: The Liga 1 match away to PSM, originally scheduled for 23 June 2019, was postponed due to PSM's schedule is close to the AFC Cup match against Becamex Bình Dương on 19 and 26 June 2019.) | PSM | A | 2–6 | Dedik 26', Kayame 81' | 5,237 | 5th |
| 20 October 2019 | Persipura | A | 2–2 | Konaté 75', Jayus 82' | 1,361 | 6th |
| 24 October 2019 | TIRA-Persikabo | A | 1–1 | Hardianto 30' | 3,189 | 7th |
| 28 October 2019 | Semen Padang | H | 1–0 | Konaté 78' (pen.) | 6,082 | 6th |
| 1 November 2019 | Badak Lampung | A | 3–4 | Sunarto 50', Konaté 79' (pen.), Hamka 83' | 9,797 | 6th |
| 8 November 2019 | Madura United | H | 2–0 | Konaté 4', Rivaldi 84' | 6,881 | 5th |
| 12 November 2019 (Note: The Liga 1 match away to Persib, originally scheduled for 28 September 2019, was postponed due to did not get permission from the security.) | Persib | A | 0–3 | | 26,098 | 5th |
| 23 November 2019 | Persija | H | 1–1 | Konaté 87' (pen.) | 40,412 | 6th |
| 27 November 2019 | Bhayangkara | A | 0–1 | | 1,015 | 6th |
| 1 December 2019 | Kalteng Putra | H | 1–1 | Dendi 54' | 4,343 | 6th |
| 8 December 2019 | PSIS | A | 1–5 | Rivaldi 49' | 15,375 | 9th |
| 12 December 2019 | Persebaya | A | 1–4 | Hamka 90+2' | 0 | 10th |
| 16 December 2019 | Bali United | H | 3–2 | Ridwan 18', Rafli 26', Nasir 68' | 4,318 | 8th |
| 22 December 2019 | Barito Putera | A | 0–3 | | 6,088 | 9th |

==== League table ====
| Pos | Team | Pld | W | D | L | GF | GA | GD | Pts |
|---|---|---|---|---|---|---|---|---|---|
| 7 | Borneo | 34 | 12 | 15 | 7 | 55 | 42 | +13 | 51 (Note: Head-to-head results: Persib 2–2 Borneo; Borneo 0–1 Persib.) |
| 8 | PSS | 34 | 12 | 12 | 10 | 45 | 42 | +3 | 48 |
| 9 | Arema | 34 | 13 | 7 | 14 | 59 | 62 | −3 | 46 |
| 10 | Persija | 34 | 11 | 11 | 12 | 43 | 42 | +1 | 44 (Note: Head-to-head points: Persija (+2) 8 pts; Persela (+0) 4 pts; PSM (–2) 4 pts.) |
| 11 | Persela | 34 | 11 | 11 | 12 | 47 | 45 | +2 | 44 |

Source: Shopee Liga 1 2019, Soccerway
Rules for classification: 1) Points; 2) Head-to-head; 3) Goal difference; 4) Goals scored; 5) Drawing.

=== Piala Indonesia ===
| Date | Round | Opponents | H / A | Result F–A | Scorers | Attendance |
|---|---|---|---|---|---|---|
| 26 January 2019 | Round of 32; First leg | Persita | H | 4–1 | Gladiador (2) 6', 78', Dedik 11', Hamka 17' | |
| 3 February 2019 | Round of 32; Second leg | Persita | A | 3–0 | Konaté 24', Gladiador 77', Hardianto 90+5' | |
| 18 February 2019 | Round of 16; First leg | Persib | A | 1–1 | Rafli 75' | |
| 22 February 2019 | Round of 16; Second leg | Persib | H | 2–2 | Konaté 3', Gladiador 73' | |

== Statistics ==
=== Squad appearances and goals ===
| No. | Pos | Nat | Player | Total | | Liga 1 | | Piala Indonesia | |
| No. | Pos | Nat | Player | Apps | Goals | Apps | Goals | Apps | Goals |
Goalkeepers
| 31 | GK | (Indonesia) IDN | Andriyas Francisco | 0 | 0 | 0 | 0 | 0 | 0 |
| 86 | GK | (Indonesia) IDN | Sandy Firmansyah | 2 | 0 | 2 | 0 | 0 | 0 |
| 93 | GK | (Indonesia) IDN | Utam Rusdiana | 17 | 0 | 13 | 0 | 4 | 0 |
| 96 | GK | (Indonesia) IDN | Kartika Ajie | 19 | 0 | 19 | 0 | 0 | 0 |
Defenders
| 6 | DF | (Indonesia) IDN | Ikhfanul Alam | 6 | 0 | 6 | 0 | 0 | 0 |
| 8 | DF | (Indonesia) IDN | Nasir | 13 | 1 | 7+5 | 1 | 1 | 0 |
| 18 | DF | (Indonesia) IDN | Ricky Ohorella | 11 | 0 | 8+2 | 0 | 1 | 0 |
| 22 | DF | (Indonesia) IDN | Rachmat Latief | 1 | 0 | 1 | 0 | 0 | 0 |
| 23 | DF | (Indonesia) IDN | Hamka Hamzah | 30 | 5 | 26 | 4 | 4 | 1 |
| 32 | DF | (Indonesia) IDN | Alfin Tuasalamony | 24 | 0 | 21+1 | 0 | 2 | 0 |
| 37 | DF | (Indonesia) IDN | Agil Munawar | 14 | 0 | 14 | 0 | 0 | 0 |
| 44 | DF | (Brazil) BRA | Arthur Cunha | 30 | 3 | 26 | 2 | 4 | 1 |
| 87 | DF | (Indonesia) IDN | Johan Alfarizi | 27 | 0 | 20+3 | 0 | 4 | 0 |
Midfielders
| 10 | MF | (Mali) MLI | Makan Konaté | 36 | 18 | 33 | 16 | 3 | 2 |
| 12 | MF | (Indonesia) IDN | Hendro Siswanto | 32 | 0 | 29 | 0 | 3 | 0 |
| 14 | MF | (Indonesia) IDN | Jayus Hariono | 20 | 1 | 14+3 | 1 | 2+1 | 0 |
| 19 | MF | (Indonesia) IDN | Hanif Sjahbandi | 21 | 2 | 15+6 | 2 | 0 | 0 |
| 30 | MF | (Indonesia) IDN | Muhammad Rafli | 19 | 3 | 4+13 | 2 | 1+1 | 1 |
| 77 | MF | (Japan) JPN | Takafumi Akahoshi | 13 | 0 | 8+5 | 0 | 0 | 0 |
| 88 | MF | (Indonesia) IDN | Vikrian Akbar | 2 | 0 | 0+2 | 0 | 0 | 0 |
Forwards
| 7 | FW | (Indonesia) IDN | Ahmad Nur Hardianto | 17 | 4 | 8+7 | 3 | 0+2 | 1 |
| 11 | FW | (Indonesia) IDN | Rivaldi Bawuo | 27 | 5 | 11+14 | 5 | 1+1 | 0 |
| 15 | FW | (Indonesia) IDN | Sunarto | 9 | 1 | 1+5 | 1 | 2+1 | 0 |
| 16 | FW | (Indonesia) IDN | Ridwan Tawainella | 13 | 2 | 7+5 | 2 | 0+1 | 0 |
| 17 | FW | (Indonesia) IDN | Zidane Pulanda | 0 | 0 | 0 | 0 | 0 | 0 |
| 21 | FW | (Indonesia) IDN | Ricky Kayame | 30 | 4 | 16+14 | 4 | 0 | 0 |
| 27 | FW | (Indonesia) IDN | Dedik Setiawan | 14 | 8 | 10+1 | 7 | 2+1 | 1 |
| 41 | FW | (Indonesia) IDN | Dendi Santoso | 31 | 4 | 29 | 4 | 2 | 0 |
| 56 | FW | (Indonesia) IDN | Titan Agung | 0 | 0 | 0 | 0 | 0 | 0 |
| 99 | FW | (Netherlands) NED | Sylvano Comvalius | 27 | 5 | 21+6 | 5 | 0 | 0 |
Players transferred or loaned out during the season the club
| 9 | FW | (Brazil) BRA | Robert Gladiador | 4 | 4 | 0 | 0 | 4 | 4 |
| 91 | MF | (Uzbekistan) UZB | Pavel Smolyachenko | 7 | 0 | 2+2 | 0 | 2+1 | 0 |

=== Top scorers ===
The list is sorted by shirt number when total goals are equal.

| Rnk | Pos | No. | Player | Liga 1 | Piala Indonesia | Total |
|---|---|---|---|---|---|---|
| 1 | MF | 10 | (Mali) Makan Konaté | 16 | 2 | 18 |
| 2 | FW | 27 | (Indonesia) Dedik Setiawan | 7 | 1 | 8 |
| 3 | FW | 11 | (Indonesia) Rivaldi Bawuo | 5 | 0 | 5 |
| 3 | DF | 23 | (Indonesia) Hamka Hamzah | 4 | 1 | 5 |
| 3 | FW | 99 | (Netherlands) Sylvano Comvalius | 5 | 0 | 5 |
| 6 | FW | 7 (9) | (Indonesia) Ahmad Nur Hardianto | 3 | 1 | 4 |
| 6 | FW | 21 | (Indonesia) Ricky Kayame | 4 | 0 | 4 |
| 6 | FW | 41 | (Indonesia) Dendi Santoso | 4 | 0 | 4 |
| 6 | FW | 9 (7) | (Brazil) Robert Gladiador | 0 | 4 | 4 |
| 10 | MF | 30 | (Indonesia) Muhammad Rafli | 2 | 1 | 3 |
| 11 | FW | 16 | (Indonesia) Ridwan Tawainella | 2 | 0 | 2 |
| 11 | MF | 19 | (Indonesia) Hanif Sjahbandi | 2 | 0 | 2 |
| 11 | DF | 44 | (Brazil) Arthur Cunha | 2 | 0 | 2 |
| 14 | DF | 8 | (Indonesia) Nasir | 1 | 0 | 1 |
| 14 | MF | 14 | (Indonesia) Jayus Hariono | 1 | 0 | 1 |
| 14 | FW | 15 | (Indonesia) Sunarto | 1 | 0 | 1 |
| Total | | | | 59 | 10 | 69 |
