= 2017 Arema F.C. season =

Arema F.C.
2017 season
- President: Rendra Kresna
- Head coach: Aji Santoso (until 31 July); Joko Susilo (from 31 July)
- Stadium: Kanjuruhan Stadium; Gajayana Stadium (only 10 and 17 June)
- Liga 1: 9th
- Top goalscorer: Cristian Gonzáles (9)
- Highest home attendance: 27,610 (vs. Persib, 12 August)
- Lowest home attendance: 1,611 (vs. Persiba, 18 August)
- Average home league attendance: 10,048
Home colours	Away colours	Third colours

The 2017 Arema F.C. season is Arema's 30th competitive season. The club will compete in Indonesia League 1. Arema Football Club a professional football club based in Malang, East Java, Indonesia. The season covers the period from 1 January 2017 to 31 December 2017.

== Squad information ==
=== First team squad ===
Note: Flags indicate national team as defined under FIFA eligibility rules; some limited exceptions apply. Players may hold more than one non-FIFA nationality.

No.	Pos.	Nation	Player
1	GK	IDN	Kurnia Meiga
4	DF	IDN	Syaiful Cahya
5	DF	IDN	Bagas Adi
6	MF	IDN	Hanif Sjahbandi
7	DF	IDN	Beny Wahyudi
10	FW	IDN	Cristian Gonzáles
11	FW	ARG	Estebán Vizcarra
12	MF	IDN	Hendro Siswanto
13	DF	IDN	Marco Kabiay
14	FW	IDN	Arif Suyono
17	MF	IDN	Dio Permana
18	MF	IDN	Adam Alis
19	MF	IDN	Ahmad Bustomi
20	FW	COL	Juan Pablo Pino

No.	Pos.	Nation	Player
21	FW	IDN	Nasir
27	FW	IDN	Dedik Setiawan
29	FW	IDN	Andrianto
31	DF	IDN	Junda Irawan
33	GK	IDN	Dwi Kuswanto
36	GK	IDN	Ahmad Ibnu Adam
41	FW	IDN	Dendi Santoso
44	DF	BRA	Arthur Cunha
77	MF	IDN	Dalmiansyah Matutu
87	DF	IDN	Johan Alfarizi (captain)
90	MF	TKM	Ahmet Ataýew
93	GK	IDN	Utam Rusdiana
94	MF	IDN	Feri Aman Saragih
98	FW	IDN	Muhammad Rafli

== Transfers ==
=== In ===
No.	Pos	Player	Transferred From	Fee	Date	Source
5	DF	(Indonesia) Bagas Adi	(Indonesia) PSS	Undisclosed	1 January 2017	
6	MF	(Indonesia) Hanif Sjahbandi	(Indonesia) Persiba	Free	1 January 2017	
18	MF	(Indonesia) Adam Alis	(Indonesia) Barito Putera	Free	1 January 2017	
21	FW	(Indonesia) Nasir	(Indonesia) Persatu	Free	1 January 2017	
77	MF	(Indonesia) Dalmiansyah Matutu	Youth sector	Promoted	1 January 2017	
98	FW	(Indonesia) Muhammad Rafli	(Indonesia) ASIFA	Free	1 January 2017	
3	DF	(Lebanon) Jad Noureddine	(Indonesia) Pusamania Borneo	Free	1 April 2017	
20	FW	(Colombia) Juan Pablo Pino	Free agent	Free	16 April 2017	
90	MF	(Turkmenistan) Ahmet Ataýew	(Turkmenistan) Altyn Asyr	Undisclosed	7 August 2017	
13	DF	(Indonesia) Marco Kabiay	(Indonesia) PSBS	Free	15 August 2017	

=== Out ===
No.	Pos	Player	Transferred To	Fee	Date	Source
6	DF	(Indonesia) Ryuji Utomo	(Indonesia) Persija	Free	1 January 2017	
8	MF	(Indonesia) Raphael Maitimo	(Indonesia) PSM	Free	1 January 2017	
16	DF	(North Macedonia) Goran Gančev	(Indonesia) Persegres	Undisclosed	1 January 2017	
23	DF	(Indonesia) Hamka Hamzah	(Indonesia) PSM	Undisclosed	1 January 2017	
25	FW	(Indonesia) Febri Setiadi Hamzah	Free agent	Free	1 January 2017	
71	FW	(Indonesia) Ahmad Nufiandani	(Indonesia) PS TNI	Free	1 January 2017	
23	MF	(Indonesia) Juan Revi	(Indonesia) Persela	Undisclosed	1 January 2017	
21	GK	(Indonesia) I Made Wardana	(Indonesia) Bali United	Free	20 January 2017	
3	DF	(Lebanon) Jad Noureddine	(Lebanon) Safa	Free	24 July 2017	

=== Loan Out ===
No.	Pos	Player	Loaned to	Start	End	Source
15	FW	(Indonesia) Sunarto	(Indonesia) Persiba	1 August 2017	31 December 2017	
89	DF	(Indonesia) Oky Derry	(Indonesia) Persiba	1 August 2017	31 December 2017	

== Pre-seasons and friendlies ==
=== Friendlies ===
Date	Opponents	H / A	Result F–A	Scorers	Attendance
9 April 2017	PSMS	A	2–0	Noureddine 45', Andrianto 77'	

=== Trofeo Bhayangkara ===
Date	Opponents	H / A	Result F–A	Scorers	Attendance
29 January 2017	Persija	N	1–0	Dendi 40'	
29 January 2017	Bhayangkara	N	0–0		

=== Indonesia President's Cup ===
==== Group stage ====
Date	Opponents	H / A	Result F–A	Scorers	Attendance	Group position
5 February 2017	Bhayangkara	H	2–0	Vizcarra 20', Alfarizi 8', Dendi 77'	7,223	1st
11 February 2017	Persija Jakarta	H	1–1	Gonzáles 23'	29,389	1st
16 February 2017	PS TNI	H	4–0	Gonzáles (2) 38' (pen.), 49', Dendi 61', Vizcarra 66'	5,460	1st

Pos	Team	Pld	W	D	L	GF	GA	GD	Pts	Qualification
1	Arema (H)	3	2	1	0	7	1	+6	7	Knockout stage
2	Bhayangkara	3	2	0	1	3	3	0	6	Knockout stage
3	Persija Jakarta	3	1	1	1	2	2	0	4	
4	PS TNI	3	0	0	3	1	7	−6	0	

Rules for classification: 1) Points; 2) Goal difference; 3) Goals scored; 4) Head-to-head; 5) Drawing.
(H) Hosts

==== Knockout phase ====
Date	Round	Opponents	H / A	Result F–A	Scorers	Attendance
26 February 2017	Quarter-finals	Sriwijaya	N	1–0	Adam Alis 48'	9,453
2 March 2017	Semi-finals; First leg	Semen Padang	A	0–1		10,000
5 March 2017	Semi-finals; Second leg	Semen Padang	H	5–2	Gonzáles (5) 28', 31', 65', 89', 90+5'	43,000
12 March 2017	Final	Pusamania Borneo	N	5–1	Hanif 30', Orah 37' (o.g.), Gonzáles (3) 42', 53', 64'	20,068

== Match results ==
=== Liga 1 ===
==== Matches ====
Date	Opponents	H / A	Result F–A	Scorers	Attendance	League position
15 April 2017	Persib	A	0–0		34,150	9th
23 April 2017	Bhayangkara	H	2–0	Dedik 18', Vizcarra 72'	12,911	4th
1 May 2017	Persiba	A	1–0	Dedik 70'	20,000	4th
5 May 2017	Barito Putera	H	1–0	Dedik 17'	7,447	2nd
10 May 2017	PSM	A	0–1		13,008	3rd
14 May 2017	Madura United	H	1–1	Gonzáles 71' (pen.)	14,240	4th
21 May 2017	Persela	A	0–4		12,200	8th
28 May 2017	Mitra Kukar	H	2–0	Feri 50', Hendro 81'	4,588	4th
2 June 2017	Persija	A	0–2		28,967	7th
10 June 2017	Perseru	H	0–0		4,929	9th
17 June 2017	Bali United	H	2–0	Gonzáles (2) 40' (pen.), 51'	11,430	6th
3 July 2017	PS TNI	A	0–0		1,498	6th
7 July 2017	Sriwijaya	H	3–2	Gonzáles 32', Dendi (2) 62', 68'	12,382	5th
12 July 2017	Persegres	A	3–2	Gonzáles 19', Noureddine 83', Dedik 90+1'	10,602	4th
16 July 2017	Persipura	H	0–2		13,849	6th
21 July 2017	Semen Padang	A	0–2		9,754	7th
30 July 2017	Borneo	H	0–0		5,375	7th
4 August 2017	Bhayangkara	A	1–2	Gonzáles 27'	2,600	8th
12 August 2017	Persib	H	0–0		27,610	7th
18 August 2017	Persiba	H	3–0	Bustomi 41', Gonzáles 44', Dedik 86'	1,611	7th
23 August 2017	Barito Putera	A	2–1	Pino 55', Vizcarra 68'	6,648	7th
30 August 2017	PSM	H	3–3	Pino (2) 59' (pen.), 69' (pen.), Adam Alis 64'	6,116	7th
10 September 2017	Madura United	A	0–2		8,327	7th
16 September 2017	Persela	H	2–0	Syaiful 45+2', Vizcarra 67'	6,008	7th
20 September 2017	Mitra Kukar	A	3–0	Alfarizi 17', Hendro 55', Ataýew 59'	3,674	7th
24 September 2017	Persija	H	1–1	Vizcarra 80'	26,917	7th
29 September 2017	Perseru	A	0–2		1,638	7th
8 October 2017	Bali United	A	1–6	Vizcarra 32'	23,320	9th
14 October 2017	PS TNI	H	1–1	Vizcarra 63'	4,363	9th
20 October 2017	Sriwijaya	A	1–1	Kabiay 29'	3,525	9th
25 October 2017	Persegres	H	2–0	Arthur 25', Gonzáles 38'	2,269	9th
29 October 2017	Persipura	A	1–3	Ataýew 41' (pen.)	12,805	9th
4 November 2017	Semen Padang	H	5–3	Arif (2) 9', 29', Alfarizi 22', Dendi 68', Vizcarra 70'	9,141	9th
11 November 2017	Borneo	A	2–3	Gonzáles 39' (pen.), Dedik 74'	12,371	9th

==== League table ====
Locations of the 2017 Liga 1 teams

Pos	Team	Pld	W	D	L	GF	GA	GD	Pts
7	Barito Putera	34	15	8	11	48	44	+4	53
8	Borneo	34	15	7	12	50	39	+11	52
9	Arema	34	13	10	11	43	44	−1	49
10	Mitra Kukar	34	13	4	17	49	74	−25	43
11	Sriwijaya	34	11	9	14	50	50	0	42 (Note: Head-to-head results: Sriwijaya 2–1 PS TNI; PS TNI 2–1 Sriwijaya.)

Source: Go-Jek Traveloka Liga 1, Soccerway
Rules for classification: 1) Points; 2) Head-to-head; 3) Goal Difference; 4) Goals Scored; 5) Drawing.

== Statistics ==
=== Squad appearances and goals ===
No.	Pos	Nat	Player	Total		Liga 1	
No.	Pos	Nat	Player	Apps	Goals	Apps	Goals
Goalkeepers
1	GK	(Indonesia) IDN	Kurnia Meiga	19	0	19	0
33	GK	(Indonesia) IDN	Dwi Kuswanto	9	0	9	0
36	GK	(Indonesia) IDN	Ahmad Ibnu Adam	0	0	0	0
93	GK	(Indonesia) IDN	Utam Rusdiana	6	0	6	0
Defenders
4	DF	(Indonesia) IDN	Syaiful Cahya	27	1	25+2	1
5	DF	(Indonesia) IDN	Bagas Adi	9	0	9	0
7	DF	(Indonesia) IDN	Beny Wahyudi	22	0	18+4	0
13	DF	(Indonesia) IDN	Marco Kabiay	6	1	6	1
31	DF	(Indonesia) IDN	Junda Irawan	12	0	11+1	0
44	DF	(Brazil) BRA	Arthur Cunha	27	1	27	1
87	DF	(Indonesia) IDN	Johan Alfarizi	30	2	29+1	2
Midfielders
6	MF	(Indonesia) IDN	Hanif Sjahbandi	14	0	11+3	0
12	MF	(Indonesia) IDN	Hendro Siswanto	30	2	26+4	2
17	MF	(Indonesia) IDN	Dio Permana	1	0	0+1	0
18	MF	(Indonesia) IDN	Adam Alis	31	1	26+5	1
19	MF	(Indonesia) IDN	Ahmad Bustomi	20	1	15+5	1
77	MF	(Indonesia) IDN	Dalmiansyah Matutu	1	0	0+1	0
90	MF	(Turkmenistan) TKM	Ahmet Ataýew	14	0	14	0
94	MF	(Indonesia) IDN	Feri Aman Saragih	20	1	9+11	1
Forwards
10	FW	(Indonesia) IDN	Cristian Gonzáles	31	9	26+5	9
11	FW	(Argentina) ARG	Estebán Vizcarra	29	7	26+3	7
14	FW	(Indonesia) IDN	Arif Suyono	9	2	3+6	2
20	FW	(Colombia) COL	Juan Pablo Pino	19	3	13+6	3
21	FW	(Indonesia) IDN	Nasir	5	0	5	0
27	FW	(Indonesia) IDN	Dedik Setiawan	28	6	8+20	6
29	FW	(Indonesia) IDN	Andrianto	7	0	7	0
41	FW	(Indonesia) IDN	Dendi Santoso	30	3	9+21	3
98	FW	(Indonesia) IDN	Muhammad Rafli	7	0	5+2	0
Players transferred or loaned out during the season the club
3	DF	(Lebanon) LBN	Jad Noureddine	13	1	11+2	1
15	FW	(Indonesia) IDN	Sunarto	1	0	0+1	0
89	DF	(Indonesia) IDN	Oky Derry	3	0	3	0

=== Top scorers ===
The list is sorted by shirt number when total goals are equal.

Rnk	Pos	No.	Player	Liga 1	Total
1	FW	10	(Indonesia) Cristian Gonzáles	9	9
2	FW	11	(Argentina) Estebán Vizcarra	7	7
3	FW	27	(Indonesia) Dedik Setiawan	6	6
4	FW	20	(Colombia) Juan Pablo Pino	3	3
4	FW	41	(Indonesia) Dendi Santoso	3	3
6	MF	12	(Indonesia) Hendro Siswanto	2	2
6	MF	14	(Indonesia) Arif Suyono	2	2
6	DF	87	(Indonesia) Johan Alfarizi	2	2
6	MF	90	(Turkmenistan) Ahmet Ataýew	2	2
10	DF	4	(Indonesia) Syaiful Cahya	1	1
10	DF	13	(Indonesia) Marco Kabiay	1	1
10	MF	18	(Indonesia) Adam Alis	1	1
10	MF	19	(Indonesia) Ahmad Bustomi	1	1
10	DF	44	(Brazil) Arthur Cunha	1	1
10	DF	94	(Indonesia) Feri Aman Saragih	1	1
10	DF	3	(Lebanon) Jad Noureddine	1	1
Total				43	43
