= 2019 Indonesia President's Cup final =

- Event: 2019 Indonesia President's Cup
Persebaya	Arema
2	4
- on aggregate

First leg
Persebaya	Arema
2	2
- Date: 9 April 2019
- Venue: Gelora Bung Tomo, Surabaya
- Man of the Match: Hendro Siswanto (Arema)
- Referee: Oki Dwi Putra
- Attendance: 50,000

Second leg
Arema	Persebaya
2	0
- Date: 12 April 2019
- Venue: Kanjuruhan, Malang
- Man of the Match: Ahmad Hardianto (Arema)
- Referee: Nusur Fadillah
- Attendance: 42,000

The 2019 Indonesia President's Cup final was the two-legged final that decided the winner of the 2019 Indonesia President's Cup, the fourth season of Indonesia's pre-season premier club football tournament organised by PSSI.

Unlike all the previous editions, it was a two-legged match home-and-away format.

The finals was contested between local rivals Persebaya and Arema. The first leg was hosted by Persebaya at Gelora Bung Tomo in Surabaya on 9 April, while the second leg was hosted by Arema at Kanjuruhan in Malang three days later.

Arema won the finals 4–2 on aggregate for their second Indonesia President's Cup title.

== Teams ==
Team	Previous finals appearances (bold indicates winners)
Persebaya	None
Arema	1 (**2017**)

== Venues ==
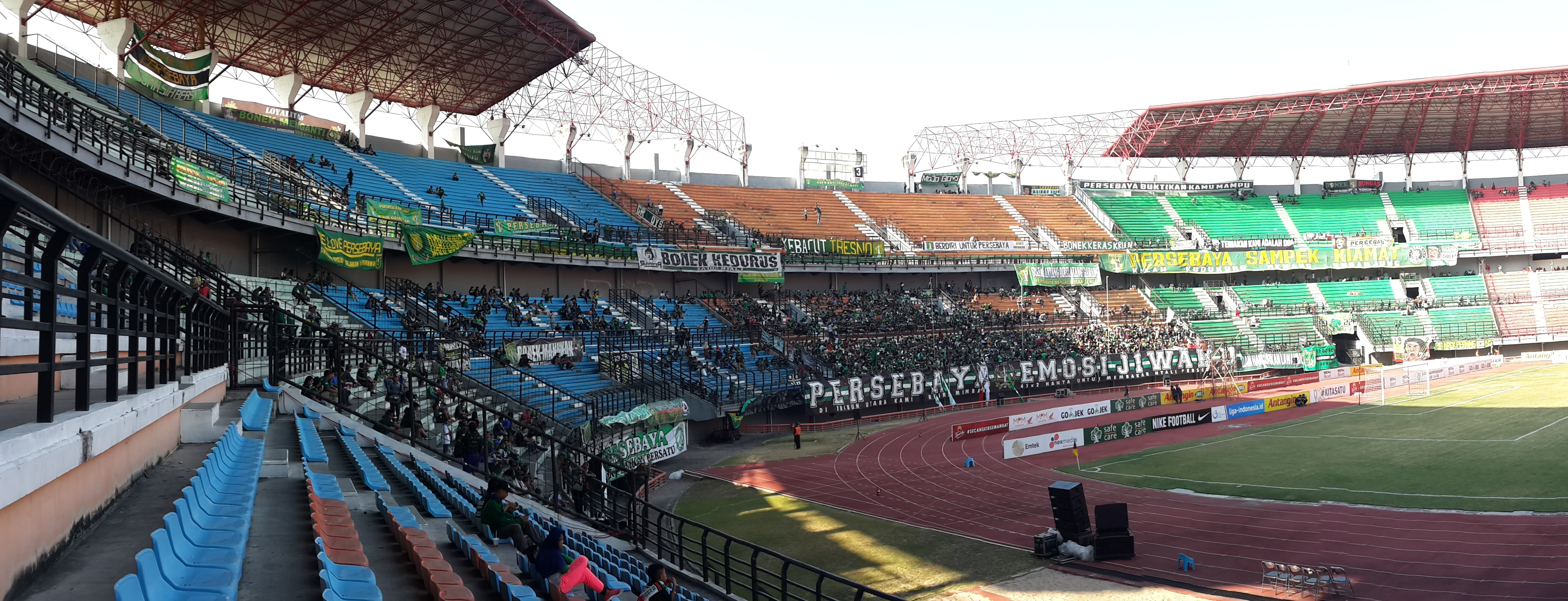
The Gelora Bung Tomo in Surabaya, hosted the first leg.

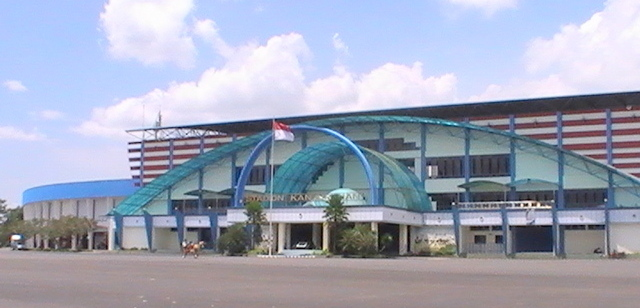
The Kanjuruhan in Malang, hosted the second leg.

== Road to the final ==
Note: In all results below, the score of the finalist is given first (H: home; A: away).

Persebaya				Round	Arema			
Opponent	Result			Group stage	Opponent	Result		
Perseru	3–2 (A)			Matchday 1	Barito Putera	3–2 (H)		
Persib	3–2 (H)			Matchday 2	Persela	0–1 (A)		
TIRA-Persikabo	0–0 (A)			Matchday 3	Persita	6–1 (H)		
**Group A winners**: Pos / Team / Pld / Pts; **1** / Persebaya / **3** / **7**; 2 / TIRA-Persikabo / 3 / **7**; 3 / Persib (H) / 3 / **3**; 4 / Perseru / 3 / **0**; Source: Piala Presiden (H) Hosts				Final standings	**Group E runners-up**: Pos / Team / Pld / Pts; 1 / Persela / 3 / **7**; **2** / Arema (H) / **3** / **6**; 3 / Barito Putera / 3 / **4**; 4 / Persita / 3 / **0**; Source: Piala Presiden (H) Hosts			
Opponent	Agg.	1st leg	2nd leg	Knockout stage	Opponent	Agg.	1st leg	2nd leg
TIRA-Persikabo	3–1 (H)			Quarter-finals	Bhayangkara	4–0 (A)		
Madura United	4–2	1–0 (H)	3–2 (A)	Semi-finals	Kalteng Putra	6–0	3–0 (H)	3–0 (A)

== Format ==
The final was played on a home-and-away two-legged basis. The away goals rule would be applied, and extra time would be played if the aggregate score was tied after the second leg and away goals rule. If the aggregate score was still tied after extra time, a penalty shoot-out would be used to determine the winner.

== Matches ==
All times were local, WIB (UTC+7).

=== First leg ===
9 April 2019
15:30

Persebaya	2–2	Arema
Irfan 7'; Lizio 72' (pen.)	Report	Hendro 33'; Konaté 79'

Gelora Bung Tomo Stadium, Surabaya
Attendance: 50,000
Referee: Oki Dwi Putra

**Persebaya**	**Arema**

GK	33	(Indonesia) Miswar Saputra
RB	29	(Indonesia) Mokhamad Syaifuddin
CB	5	(Brazil) Otávio Dutra
CB	23	(Indonesia) Hansamu Yama
LB	2	(Indonesia) Novan Sasongko
CM	6	(Indonesia) Misbakus Solikin (c)
CM	96	(Indonesia) Muhammad Hidayat		(substituted off) 12'
CM	10	(Bolivia) Damián Lizio
RW	41	(Indonesia) Irfan Jaya		(substituted off) 88'
LW	63	(Tajikistan) Manuchekhr Dzhalilov
CF	9	(Guinea-Bissau) Amido Baldé	(yellow card) 86'
Substitutes:
GK	1	(Indonesia) Abdul Rohim
DF	13	(Indonesia) Rachmat Irianto
DF	14	(Indonesia) Ruben Sanadi
MF	8	(Indonesia) Oktafianus Fernando		(substituted in) 88'
MF	12	(Indonesia) Rendi Irwan
MF	27	(Indonesia) Fandi Eko		(substituted in) 12' (substituted off) 69'
FW	20	(Indonesia) Osvaldo Haay		(substituted in) 69'
Head Coach:
(Indonesia) Djadjang Nurdjaman

Starting XI

GK	96	(Indonesia) Kurniawan Ajie
RB	39	(Indonesia) Alfin Tuasalamony
CB	44	(Brazil) Arthur Cunha
CB	23	(Indonesia) Hamka Hamzah (c)
LB	87	(Indonesia) Johan Alfarizi
CM	12	(Indonesia) Hendro Siswanto
CM	10	(Mali) Makan Konaté
CM	19	(Indonesia) Hanif Sjahbandi	(yellow card) 52'
RW	41	(Indonesia) Dendi Santoso
LW	21	(Indonesia) Ricky Kayame		(substituted off) 64'
CF	27	(Indonesia) Dedik Setiawan
Substitutes:
GK	93	(Indonesia) Utam Rusdiana
DF	6	(Indonesia) Ikhfanul Alam
DF	18	(Indonesia) Ricky Ohorella
MF	14	(Indonesia) Jayus Hariono
MF	30	(Indonesia) Muhammad Rafli
FW	7	(Indonesia) Ahmad Hardianto
FW	11	(Indonesia) Rivaldi Bawuo		(substituted in) 64'
Head Coach:
(Bosnia and Herzegovina) Milomir Šešlija

Man of the Match:
Hendro Siswanto (Arema)

Assistant referees:
I Gede Slamet Raharjo
Armes Renko
Fourth official:
Handri Kristanto

**Match rules**

- 90 minutes.
- Seven named substitutes, of which up to three may be used.

=== Second leg ===
12 April 2019
20:00

Arema	2–0	Persebaya
Hardianto 43'; Kayame 90+2'	Report

Kanjuruhan Stadium, Malang
Attendance: 42,000
Referee: Nusur Fadillah

**Arema**	**Persebaya**

GK	96	(Indonesia) Kurniawan Ajie	(yellow card) 64'
RB	39	(Indonesia) Alfin Tuasalamony
CB	44	(Brazil) Arthur Cunha	(yellow card) 90'
CB	23	(Indonesia) Hamka Hamzah (c)
LB	87	(Indonesia) Johan Alfarizi
CM	12	(Indonesia) Hendro Siswanto
CM	10	(Mali) Makan Konaté
CM	19	(Indonesia) Hanif Sjahbandi		(substituted off) 76'
RW	7	(Indonesia) Ahmad Hardianto		(substituted off) 57'
LW	21	(Indonesia) Ricky Kayame		(substituted off) 90+4'
CF	27	(Indonesia) Dedik Setiawan
Substitutes:
GK	93	(Indonesia) Utam Rusdiana
DF	6	(Indonesia) Ikhfanul Alam
DF	18	(Indonesia) Ricky Ohorella
MF	14	(Indonesia) Jayus Hariono		(substituted in) 57'
MF	30	(Indonesia) Muhammad Rafli		(substituted in) 90+4'
FW	11	(Indonesia) Rivaldi Bawuo	(yellow card) 83'	(substituted in) 76'
FW	15	(Indonesia) Sunarto
Head Coach:
(Bosnia and Herzegovina) Milomir Šešlija

Starting XI

GK	1	(Indonesia) Abdul Rohim
RB	2	(Indonesia) Novan Sasongko
CB	5	(Brazil) Otávio Dutra	(yellow card) 61'
CB	23	(Indonesia) Hansamu Yama
LB	14	(Indonesia) Ruben Sanadi (c)
CM	6	(Indonesia) Misbakus Solikin
CM	10	(Bolivia) Damián Lizio	(yellow card) 84'	(substituted off) 86'
CM	22	(Indonesia) Abu Rizal	(yellow card) 14'	(substituted off) 60'
RW	41	(Indonesia) Irfan Jaya		(substituted off) 60'
LW	63	(Tajikistan) Manuchekhr Dzhalilov
CF	9	(Guinea-Bissau) Amido Baldé	(yellow card) 81'
Substitutes:
GK	82	(Indonesia) Imam Arief
DF	13	(Indonesia) Rachmat Irianto
DF	29	(Indonesia) Mokhamad Syaifuddin
MF	8	(Indonesia) Oktafianus Fernando		(substituted in) 86'
MF	12	(Indonesia) Rendi Irwan		(substituted in) 60'
MF	27	(Indonesia) Fandi Eko
FW	20	(Indonesia) Osvaldo Haay		(substituted in) 60'
Head Coach:
(Indonesia) Djadjang Nurdjaman

Man of the Match:
Ahmad Hardianto (Arema)

Assistant referees:
Bambang Samsudar
Azizul Alimudin
Fourth official:
Yudi Nurcahya

**Match rules**

- 90 minutes.
- 30 minutes of extra time if tied on aggregate and away goals rule.
- Penalty shoot-out if still tied after extra time.
- Seven named substitutes, of which up to three may be used.
