= Rachmat Latief =

Indonesian footballer

Personal information
- Full name: Rachmat Latief
- Date of birth: 27 September 1988 (age 38)
- Place of birth: Makassar, Indonesia
- Height: 1.83 m (6 ft 0 in)
- Position: Centre-back

Team information
- Current team: Persibas Banyumas
- Number: 22

Youth career
- 2000−2005: Makassar Football School
- 2006: Persib Bandung

Senior career*
Years	Team	Apps	(Gls)
2007−2009	PSM Makassar	32	(1)
2009−2010	Persiram Raja Ampat	15	(0)
2010−2011	Sriwijaya	3	(0)
2011−2012	Persiba Balikpapan	27	(3)
2012–2013	Mitra Kukar	21	(0)
2014	PSM Makassar	8	(0)
2014−2016	Borneo	25	(2)
2017	Persebaya Surabaya	4	(0)
2017	757 Kepri Jaya	9	(1)
2018	Martapura	17	(1)
2019	Arema	1	(0)
2021	PSCS Cilacap	10	(0)
2022–2023	Persipa Pati	6	(0)
2023–2024	Persipal Palu	10	(0)
2024–2025	Persewangi Banyuwangi	7	(0)
2025–	Persibas Banyumas	7	(3)

International career
2007	Indonesia U19	4	(0)
2009	Indonesia U23	4	(0)
2009	Indonesia	1	(0)
- * Club domestic league appearances and goals as of 22:00, 4 February 2026 (UTC)

Rachmat Latief (born 27 September 1988) is an Indonesian professional footballer who plays as a centre-back for Liga 4 club Persibas Banyumas.

== Club career ==
=== Persebaya ===
He was signed for Persebaya Surabaya to play in Liga 1 in the 2017 season. Rachmat made his debut on 20 April 2017 in a match against Madiun Putra F.C. at the Gelora Bung Tomo Stadium, Surabaya.

=== Martapura ===
In 2018, Latief signed a contract with Indonesian Liga 2 club Martapura.

=== Arema ===
He was signed for Arema to play in Liga 1 in the 2019 season. Rachmat made his debut on 13 September 2019 in a match against Borneo at the Kanjuruhan Stadium, Malang.

=== PSCS Cilacap ===
In 2021, Rachmat Latief signed a contract with Indonesian Liga 2 club PSCS Cilacap. He made his league debut on 26 September in a 1–0 win against PSIM Yogyakarta at the Manahan Stadium, Surakarta.

=== Persipa Pati ===
Latief was signed for Persipa Pati to play in Liga 2 in the 2022–23 season. He made his league debut on 30 August 2022 in a match against Nusantara United at the Moch. Soebroto Stadium, Magelang.

== Career statistics ==
=== International ===
As of match played 11 June 2009

Appearances and goals by national team and year
National team	Year	Apps	Goals
Indonesia	2009	1	0
Total		1	0

== Honours ==
=== Club ===
Arema

- Indonesia President's Cup: 2019

Persewangi Banyuwangi

- Liga 4 East Java: 2024–25
