= Joko Ribowo =

Indonesian footballer

Personal information
- Full name: Joko Ribowo
- Date of birth: 15 March 1989 (age 37)
- Place of birth: Demak, Indonesia
- Height: 1.77 m (5 ft 10 in)
- Position: Goalkeeper

Senior career*
| Years | Team | Apps | (Gls) |
| 2010–2012 | Persema Malang | 10 | (0) |
| 2012–2014 | Persijap Jepara | 20 | (0) |
| 2014–2016 | Barito Putera | 12 | (0) |
| 2016–2017 | Madura United | 6 | (0) |
| 2017 | → Mitra Kukar (loan) | 9 | (0) |
| 2018 | Arema | 10 | (0) |
| 2018–2022 | PSIS Semarang | 34 | (0) |
| 2022–2023 | Barito Putera | 14 | (0) |
| 2023–2024 | Malut United | 4 | (0) |
| Total | | 119 | (0) |

Managerial career
- 2024–: Malut United (GK coach)
- * Club domestic league appearances and goals

Joko Ribowo (born 15 March 1989) is an Indonesian former professional footballer who plays as a goalkeeper.

== Club career ==
=== Arema F.C. ===
He was signed for Arema to play in Liga 1 in the 2018 season. Ribowo made his league debut on 27 April 2018 in a match against Persipura Jayapura at the Kanjuruhan Stadium, Malang.

=== PSIS Semarang ===
He was signed for PSIS Semarang to play in Liga 1 in the middle 2018 season. Ribowo made his league debut on 4 August 2018 in a match against Bali United at the Kapten I Wayan Dipta Stadium, Gianyar.

=== PS Barito Putera ===
Ribowo was signed for Barito Putera to play in Liga 1 in the 2022–23 season. He made his league debut on 23 July 2022 in a match against Madura United at the Gelora Ratu Pamelingan Stadium, Pamekasan.

== Honours ==
Malut United

- Liga 2 third place (play-offs): 2023–24
