= Jefri Kurniawan =

Indonesian footballer (born 1991)

Personal information
- Full name: Jefri Kurniawan
- Date of birth: 18 March 1991 (age 35)
- Place of birth: Malang, East Java, Indonesia
- Height: 1.68 m (5 ft 6 in)
- Position: Winger

Team information
- Current team: BBP Putra Wonogiri

Youth career
- 2004–2007: Arema
- 2008–2010: Persema Malang

Senior career*
Years	Team	Apps	(Gls)
2009–2010	Persekam Metro	0	(0)
2010–2011	Persikoba Batu City	8	(0)
2011–2012	Persik Kendal	20	(0)
2012–2013	Persesam Sampit	4	(0)
2013–2014	PPSM Magelang	12	(2)
2014–2015	Persinga Ngawi	5	(0)
2015–2016	Borneo	25	(7)
2017–2019	Persija Jakarta	6	(0)
2017	→ Borneo (loan)	8	(0)
2018	→ Arema (loan)	9	(0)
2019	Badak Lampung	13	(1)
2019–2022	PSS Sleman	22	(1)
2022–2024	Gresik United	16	(0)
2025–2026	Persip Pekalongan	7	(1)
2026–	BBP Putra Wonogiri		

Managerial career
- 2024−2025: Pasuruan United (head coach)
- * Club domestic league appearances and goals as of 21 February 2025

Jefri Kurniawan (born in Malang, 18 March 1991) is an Indonesian professional footballer who plays as a winger for Liga 4 club BBP Putra Wonogiri.

== Club career ==
=== Persinga Ngawi ===
Jefri Kurniawan was named as the best player in the 2015 Merdeka Cup when playing for Persinga Ngawi. Jefri also played for Persegres Gresik United in the 2015 Jendral Sudirman Cup.

=== Pusamania Borneo ===
Jefri made his debut with Pusamania Borneo in 2016 Indonesia Soccer Championship A against Bali United. He scored his first goal in the third matchday, playing against Persiba Balikpapan.

=== Persija Jakarta ===
He was signed for Persija Jakarta to play in Liga 1 in the 2017 season. Jefri made his league debut on 16 April 2017 in a match against Persiba Balikpapan at the Batakan Stadium, Balikpapan.

==== Borneo (loan) ====
He was signed for Borneo to play in the Liga 1 in the 2017 season, on loan from Persija Jakarta. Jefri made his league debut on 5 August 2017 in a match against Sriwijaya at the Segiri Stadium, Samarinda.

==== Arema (loan) ====
He was signed for Arema to play in the Liga 1 in the 2018 season, on loan from Persija Jakarta. Jefri made his league debut on 24 April 2018 in a match against Persipura Jayapura at the Kanjuruhan Stadium, Malang.

=== Badak Lampung ===
In 2019, Jefri signed a one-year contract with Indonesian Liga 1 club Badak Lampung. He made his league debut on 18 May 2019 in a match against TIRA-Persikabo at the Pakansari Stadium, Cibinong. On 27 July 2019, Jefri scored his first goal for Badak Lampung in the 82nd minute against Madura United.

=== PSS Sleman ===
He was signed for PSS Sleman to play in Liga 1 in the 2019 middle season. Jefri made his league debut on 24 September 2019 in a match against Arema. On 29 October 2019, Jefri scored his first goal for PSS in the 16th minute against Persebaya Surabaya at the Gelora Bung Tomo Stadium, Surabaya.

== International career ==
He was called up to the Indonesia national team for a friendly match against Vietnam on 9 October 2016.

== Honours ==
=== Club ===
PSS Sleman

- Menpora Cup third place: 2021
