= Rodrigo Ost =

Brazilian footballer (born 1988)

Personal information
- Full name: Rodrigo Ost dos Santos
- Date of birth: 2 August 1988 (age 38)
- Place of birth: São Paulo, Brazil
- Height: 1.88 m (6 ft 2 in)
- Position: Midfielder

Team information
- Current team: Xagħra United
- Number: 10

Senior career*
Years	Team	Apps	(Gls)
2011	Mogi Mirim	2	(0)
2011	Itumbiara	1	(0)
2012	Atlético Sorocaba	2	(0)
2012	Capivariano	2	(0)
2013	Rio Preto	4	(0)
2015–2016	Mitra Kukar	25	(4)
2017	Comercial (MS)	10	(2)
2017	Moto Club	0	(0)
2018	Arema	0	(0)
2018–2019	Itaboraí	2	(0)
2019–	Xagħra United	15	(3)
- * Club domestic league appearances and goals as of 13 December 2019

Rodrigo Ost dos Santos (born 2 August 1988) is a Brazilian professional footballer who plays as a midfielder for Xagħra United.

== Honours ==
Mitra Kukar

- General Sudirman Cup: 2015
