= Oky Derry Andryan =

Indonesian association footballer

Oky Derry
Personal information
- Full name: Oky Derry Andryan
- Date of birth: 8 September 1993 (age 33)
- Place of birth: Malang, Indonesia
- Height: 1.79 m (5 ft 10 in)
- Position: Defensive midfielder

Youth career
- 2012–2015: Arema U-21

Senior career*
| Years | Team | Apps | (Gls) |
| 2015–2017 | Arema FC | 12 | (0) |
| 2017 | → Persiba Balikpapan (loan) | 3 | (0) |
| 2018–2021 | Persis Solo | 21 | (0) |
| 2022 | Putra Delta Sidoarjo | 2 | (0) |
- * Club domestic league appearances and goals as of 5 September 2022

Oky Derry Andryan (born 8 September 1993 in Malang) is an Indonesian professional footballer who plays as a defensive midfielder.

== Club career ==
=== Arema FC ===
He began his career in Arema U-21. and was appointed as a captain. In 2015, he was recommended by the coach for a contract and joined Arema FC. He is a defender

==== Persib Balikpapan (loan) ====
He was signed for Persiba Balikpapan to play in the Liga 1 in the 2017 season, on loan from Arema.

=== Persis Solo ===
In 2018, Oky Derry signed a contract with Indonesian Liga 2 club Persis Solo.

== Honours ==
=== Club ===
Arema

- Indonesia President's Cup: 2017
