= Pavel Smolyachenko =

Uzbekistani footballer

Personal information
- Full name: Pavel Smolyachenko
- Date of birth: 1 December 1991 (age 34)
- Place of birth: Fergana, Uzbekistan
- Height: 1.86 m (6 ft 1 in)
- Position: Midfielder

Senior career*
Years	Team	Apps	(Gls)
2010–2012	Neftchi Farg'ona	33	(5)
2013	Lokomotiv Tashkent	2	(0)
2013–2014	Neftchi Farg'ona	30	(0)
2015	FK Dinamo Samarqand	9	(0)
2016	FK Buxoro	16	(0)
2016–2017	FC Andijon	13	(0)
2017–2018	ATM FA	12	(6)
2018–2019	PFK Metallurg Bekabad	24	(0)
2019	Arema	4	(0)
2020–2021	Neftchi Farg'ona	1	(0)
2021–	Istiqlol Fergana	0	(0)

International career^{‡}
2011–	Uzbekistan	1	(0)
- * Club domestic league appearances and goals as of 22 March 2015 ‡ National team caps and goals as of 11 November 2011

Pavel Smolyachenko (born 1 December 1991) is an Uzbekistani footballer who currently plays as a midfielder for Uzbekistan Pro League club Istiqlol Fergana.

== Club career ==
In 2010-2012 he played for Neftchi Farg'ona where he managed 4 appearances in his first season. After playing half season for Lokomotiv Tashkent in 2013 he moved back to Neftchi Farg'ona. In 2015, he joined FK Dinamo Samarqand.

== International career ==
In 2011, he made his debut for the Uzbekistan national football team.

== Honours ==
=== Club ===
Arema

- Indonesia President's Cup: 2019
