= Robert Gladiador =

Brazilian footballer

Personal information
- Full name: Robert Lima Guimarães
- Date of birth: 2 January 1987 (age 39)
- Place of birth: Curvelo, Brazil
- Height: 1.80 m (5 ft 11 in)
- Position: Forward

Senior career*
Years	Team	Apps	(Gls)
2012–2013	Passo Fundo	4	(0)
2014–2015	Esportivo	9	(0)
2015–2016	Pelotas		
2016–2017	Al-Hazem	12	(1)
2017–2019	Al-Shabab		
2019–2020	Arema	0	(0)
2020	Estrela do Norte	4	(1)
- * Club domestic league appearances and goals

Robert Lima Guimarães (born 2 January 1987), commonly known as Robert Gladiador, is a Brazilian footballer who last plays as a forward for Estrela do Norte.

== Career statistics ==
=== Club ===
As of 4 April 2019.

Club	Season	League			Cup		Other		Total	
Club	Season	Division	Apps	Goals	Apps	Goals	Apps	Goals	Apps	Goals
Lajeadense	2012	–			0	0	9 (Note: Appearances in the Campeonato Gaúcho)	1	9	1
Passo Fundo	2013	–			0	0	4	0	4	0
Esportivo	2014	–			0	0	9	0	9	0
Brasil de Farroupilha	2015	–			0	0	8 (Note: Appearances in the Campeonato Gaúcho Série B)	0	8	0
Itapemirim	2016	–			0	0	2 (Note: Appearances in the Campeonato Capixaba)	0	2	0
Estrela do Norte	2017	–			0	0	9 (Note: Appearances in the Campeonato Capixaba A2)	2	9	2
Arema	2019	Liga 1	0	0	4	4	2 (Note: Appearances in Indonesia President's Cup)	0	6	4
Career total			0	0	4	4	43	3	47	7

== Honours ==
Al-Shabab

- Kuwaiti Division One: 2017–18

Arema

- Indonesia President's Cup: 2019
