= Teddy Heri Setiawan =

Indonesian footballer

Personal information
- Full name: Teddy Heri Setiawan
- Date of birth: 21 April 1991 (age 35)
- Place of birth: Kediri, Indonesia
- Height: 1.83 m (6 ft 0 in)
- Position: Goalkeeper

Team information
- Current team: Persipa Pati
- Number: 91

Senior career*
Years	Team	Apps	(Gls)
2014–2017	Persik Kediri	22	(0)
2015	→ Madiun Putra (loan)	0	(0)
2018	Arema	0	(0)
2018	Martapura	9	(0)
2019	Persiba Balikpapan	1	(0)
2019	Babel United	2	(0)
2020–2021	Persiraja	0	(0)
2021–2023	Persikabo 1973	9	(0)
2023–2024	Persekat Tegal	10	(0)
2024–	Persipa Pati	15	(0)
- * Club domestic league appearances and goals as of 17 February 2025

Teddy Heri Setiawan (born 21 April 1991) is an Indonesian professional footballer who plays as a goalkeeper for Liga 2 club Persipa Pati.

== Club career ==
Setiawan joined Indonesia Super League club Arema in November 2017. He was released in July 2018. Then he played for Martapura, Persiba Balikpapan and Babel United during 2018 and 2019.

In February 2020, Persiraja Banda Aceh confirmed that he will join to the club to compete in 2020 Liga 1. This season was suspended on 27 March 2020 due to the COVID-19 pandemic. The season was abandoned and was declared void on 20 January 2021.
