= Agil Munawar =

Indonesian association football player

Personal information
- Full name: Agil Munawar
- Date of birth: 9 April 1996 (age 30)
- Place of birth: Bandung, Indonesia
- Height: 1.69 m (5 ft 7 in)
- Position: Full-back

Team information
- Current team: Persik Kediri
- Number: 37

Youth career
- 2015: Persikas Subang
- 2016: Persib Bandung

Senior career*
Years	Team	Apps	(Gls)
2017	PS TIRA	23	(0)
2018–2019	Arema	16	(0)
2021–	Persik Kediri	63	(0)
- * Club domestic league appearances and goals as of 28 September 2024

Agil Munawar (born 9 April 1996) is an Indonesian professional footballer who plays as a full-back for Liga 1 club Persik Kediri.

== Club career ==
=== PS TNI ===
In 2017, Agil Munawar signed a contract with Indonesian Liga 1 club PS TNI. He made his league debut on 22 April 2017 in a match against Persib Bandung at the Pakansari Stadium, Cibinong.

=== Arema FC ===
He was signed for Arema to play in the Liga 1 in the 2018 season. Munawar made his debut on 13 September 2018 in a match against Persib Bandung at the Gelora Bandung Lautan Api Stadium, Bandung.

=== Persik Kediri ===
In 2021, Agil Munawar signed a contract with Indonesian Liga 1 club Persik Kediri. He made his league debut on 21 October 2021 in a match against Persipura Jayapura at the Moch. Soebroto Stadium, Magelang.

== Career statistics ==
=== Club ===
As of match played 28 September 2024

Club	Season	League			Cup (Note: Includes Piala Indonesia)		Continental		Other (Note: Appearances in Indonesia President's Cup)		Total	
Club	Season	Division	Apps	Goals	Apps	Goals	Apps	Goals	Apps	Goals	Apps	Goals
PS TNI	2017	Liga 1	23	0	0	0	–		0	0	23	0
Arema	2018	Liga 1	2	0	0	0	–		2	0	4	0
Arema	2019	Liga 1	14	0	0	0	–		1	0	15	0
Arema	Total		16	0	0	0	–		3	0	19	0
Persik Kediri	2021–22	Liga 1	19	0	0	0	–		0	0	19	0
Persik Kediri	2022–23	Liga 1	25	0	0	0	–		2	0	27	0
Persik Kediri	2023–24	Liga 1	14	0	0	0	–		0	0	14	0
Persik Kediri	2024–25	Liga 1	4	0	0	0	–		0	0	4	0
Career total			101	0	0	0	0	0	5	0	106	0

== Honours ==
=== Club ===
Arema

- Indonesia President's Cup: 2019
