= Feri Aman Saragih =

Indonesian association footballer

Personal information
- Full name: Feri Aman Saragih
- Date of birth: 12 June 1988 (age 38)
- Place of birth: Kediri, Indonesia
- Height: 1.80 m (5 ft 11 in)
- Position: Midfielder

Youth career
- 2002−2005: Petrokimia Putra

Senior career*
Years	Team	Apps	(Gls)
2006−2007	Persewangi Banyuwangi	20	(6)
2008−2009	Mitra Kukar	27	(5)
2009−2011	Deltras Sidoarjo	47	(5)
2011−2012	Arema Cronus	30	(3)
2013–2014	Pusamania Borneo	24	(3)
2015−2017	Arema Cronus	52	(2)
2018	Kalteng Putra	7	(1)
2018	Perserang Serang	7	(0)
2019	Madura	14	(0)
2020	Martapura	1	(0)
2021−2022	Putra Delta Sidoarjo	22	(6)
2023–2024	Persipasi Kota Bekasi	15	(0)
2024–2025	Tornado	15	(2)
- * Club domestic league appearances and goals as of 20:16, 27 February 2025 (UTC)

Feri Aman Saragih (born 12 June 1988) is an Indonesian professional footballer who plays as a midfielder.

== Honours ==
Deltras Sidoarjo

- Liga Indonesia Premier Division runner up: 2009–10

Arema

- Indonesia President's Cup: 2017
- Indonesian Inter Island Cup: 2014/15

Tornado

- Liga Nusantara runner-up: 2024–25
