= Kartika Ajie =

Indonesian professional footballer

Personal information
- Full name: Kurniawan Kartika Ajie
- Date of birth: 20 June 1996 (age 30)
- Place of birth: Balikpapan, Indonesia
- Height: 1.82 m (6 ft 0 in)
- Position: Goalkeeper

Team information
- Current team: Persita Tangerang
- Number: 96

Youth career
- 2014–2016: Persiba Balikpapan

Senior career*
Years	Team	Apps	(Gls)
2016–2017	Persiba Balikpapan	11	(0)
2017–2022	Arema	21	(0)
2021	→ RANS Cilegon (loan)	13	(0)
2022	→ Barito Putera (loan)	3	(0)
2022–2023	Persik Kediri	22	(0)
2023–	Persita Tangerang	22	(0)

International career
2017	Indonesia U23	8	(0)
Medal record
Men's football
Representing Indonesia
Southeast Asian Games
Bronze medal – third place	2017 Kuala Lumpur	Team
- * Club domestic league appearances and goals as of 13 September 2026

Kurniawan Kartika Ajie (born 20 June 1996) is an Indonesian professional footballer who plays as a goalkeeper for Super League club Persita Tangerang.

== Club career ==
=== Persiba Balikpapan ===
In 2016, Kurniawan promotion to senior team of Persiba Balikpapan in 2016 Indonesia Soccer Championship A. He quickly rose as the team's starting goalkeeper, appearing in 11 matches in two seasons Indonesia Soccer Championship A and Liga 1.

=== Arema FC ===
In 2018, Ajie signed a contract with Indonesian Liga 1 club Arema. He made his league debut on 24 March 2018 in a match against Mitra Kukar at the Kanjuruhan Stadium, Malang.

==== RANS Cilegon (loan) ====
He was signed for RANS Cilegon to play in Liga 2, on loan form Liga 1 club Arema. Kartika Ajie made his league debut on 5 October 2021 in a match against Persekat Tegal at the Gelora Bung Karno Madya Stadium, Jakarta.

==== Barito Putera (loan) ====
In January 2022, Ajie signed a contract with Liga 1 club Barito Putera on loan from Arema. He made his league debut in a 2–0 loss against Borneo on 14 January 2022 at the Kompyang Sujana Stadium, Denpasar.

=== Persik Kediri ===
Kartika Ajie was signed for Persik Kediri to play in Liga 1 in the 2022–23 season. He made his league debut on 19 August 2022 in a match against PSIS Semarang at the Jatidiri Stadium, Semarang.

== Career statistics ==
=== Club ===
As of 13 September 2026.

Club	Season	League			Cup (Note: Includes Piala Indonesia.)		Continental		Other (Note: Appearances in Indonesia President's Cup.)		Total	
Club	Season	Division	Apps	Goals	Apps	Goals	Apps	Goals	Apps	Goals	Apps	Goals
Persiba Balikpapan	2016	ISC A	1	0	0	0	—		0	0	1	0
Persiba Balikpapan	2017	Liga 1	10	0	0	0	—		3	0	13	0
Persiba Balikpapan	Total		11	0	0	0	—		3	0	14	0
Arema	2018	Liga 1	2	0	1	0	—		3	0	6	0
Arema	2019	Liga 1	19	0	0	0	—		6	0	25	0
Arema	2020	Liga 1	0	0	0	0	—		0	0	0	0
Arema	2021–22	Liga 1	0	0	0	0	—		0	0	0	0
Arema	Total		21	0	1	0	—		9	0	31	0
RANS Cilegon (loan)	2021	Liga 2	13	0	0	0	—		0	0	13	0
Barito Putera (loan)	2021–22	Liga 1	3	0	0	0	—		0	0	3	0
Persik Kediri	2022–23	Liga 1	14	0	0	0	—		1	0	15	0
Persik Kediri	2023–24	Liga 1	8	0	0	0	–		0	0	8	0
Persik Kediri	Total		22	0	0	0	—		1	0	23	0
Persita Tangerang	2023–24	Liga 1	14	0	0	0	—		0	0	14	0
Persita Tangerang	2024–25	Liga 1	6	0	0	0	—		0	0	6	0
Persita Tangerang	2025–26	Super League	1	0	0	0	–		0	0	1	0
Persita Tangerang	2026–27	Super League	1	0	0	0	–		0	0	1	0
Career total			92	0	1	0	0	0	13	0	106	0

== Honours ==
=== Club ===
Arema

- Indonesia President's Cup: 2019

RANS Cilegon

- Liga 2 runner-up: 2021

=== International ===
Indonesia U-23

- SEA Games bronze medal: 2017

Indonesia

- Aceh World Solidarity Cup runner-up: 2017

=== Individual ===
- East Kalimantan Governor Cup Best Young Player: 2018
