= Ridwan Tawainella =

Indonesian footballers

Personal information
- Full name: Ridwan Tawainella
- Date of birth: 15 May 1995 (age 31)
- Place of birth: Tulehu, Indonesia
- Height: 1.71 m (5 ft 7 in)
- Position: Winger

Team information
- Current team: Persibas Banyumas
- Number: 16

Youth career
- 2014: Cilegon United

Senior career*
Years	Team	Apps	(Gls)
2015–2018	PSM Makassar	39	(4)
2018–2022	Arema	48	(4)
2022	Bekasi City	6	(0)
2023	Malut United	3	(0)
2023–2024	Persela Lamongan	7	(0)
2024–2025	Persikota Tangerang	9	(1)
2025–	Persibas Banyumas	8	(0)
- * Club domestic league appearances and goals as of 4 February 2026

Ridwan Tawainella (born 15 May 1995) is an Indonesian professional footballer who plays as a winger for Liga 4 club Persibas Banyumas. Ridwan was born in Tulehu, where the village is known as the village who gave birth to many national football players.

== Club career ==
=== PSM Makassar ===
November 2015, Ridwan with other players from Maluku, Risman, signed a contract as a PSM Makassar player.

Ridwan managed to steal the public's attention while playing for PSM Makassar in 2015 Sudirman Cup. First time for Ridwan joined to the Indonesia Super League club like a PSM Makassar and playing in the national level.

=== Arema ===
He was signed for Arema to play in Liga 1 in the 2018 season. Tawainella made his debut on 31 March 2018 in a match against Persija Jakarta. On 21 July 2018, Tawainella scored his first goal for Arema against Sriwijaya in the 51st minute at the Gelora Sriwijaya Stadium, Palembang.

=== Bekasi City ===
On 5 June 2022, it was announced that Saldi would be joining Bekasi City for the 2022-23 Liga 2 campaign.

== Career statistics ==
=== Club ===
As of match played 11 January 2025

Club	Season	League			Cup (Note: Includes Piala Indonesia)		Continental		Other (Note: Appearances in Indonesia President's Cup)		Total	
Club	Season	Division	Apps	Goals	Apps	Goals	Apps	Goals	Apps	Goals	Apps	Goals
PSM Makassar	2016	ISC A	26	3	0	0	—		0	0	26	3
PSM Makassar	2017	Liga 1	13	1	0	0	—		3	0	16	1
PSM Makassar	Total		39	4	0	0	—		3	0	42	4
Arema	2018	Liga 1	17	1	0	0	—		2	0	19	1
Arema	2019	Liga 1	12	2	1	0	—		3	0	16	2
Arema	2020	Liga 1	1	0	0	0	—		0	0	1	0
Arema	2021–22	Liga 1	18	1	0	0	—		1 (Note: Appearances in Menpora Cup)	0	19	1
Arema	Total		48	4	1	0	—		6	0	55	4
Bekasi City	2022–23	Liga 2	6	0	0	0	—		0	0	6	0
Maluku Utara United	2023–24	Liga 2	3	0	0	0	—		0	0	3	0
Persela Lamongan	2023–24	Liga 2	7	0	0	0	—		0	0	7	0
Persikota Tangerang	2024–25	Liga 2	9	1	0	0	—		0	0	9	1
Career total			112	9	1	0	0	0	9	0	122	9

== Honours ==
=== Club ===
Arema

- Indonesia President's Cup: 2019
