= Israel Wamiau =

Indonesian footballer

Personal information
- Full name: Israel Wamiau
- Date of birth: 28 October 1994 (age 32)
- Place of birth: Jayapura, Indonesia
- Height: 1.86 m (6 ft 1 in)
- Position: Centre-back

Team information
- Current team: Persipura Jayapura
- Number: 28

Senior career*
Years	Team	Apps	(Gls)
2017	Persipura Jayapura	1	(0)
2018	Arema	12	(0)
2019–2022	Persipura Jayapura	29	(0)
2022–2023	Persita Tangerang	1	(0)
2023	Persipura Jayapura	0	(0)
2023–2024	PSBS Biak	6	(0)
2024	Persipa Pati	5	(0)
2024–2025	Persibo Bojonegoro	1	(0)
2026	Emmanuel FC	9	(1)
2026–	Persipura Jayapura	0	(0)
- * Club domestic league appearances and goals as of 21 December 2024

Israel Wamiau (born 28 October 1994) is an Indonesian professional footballer who last played as a centre-back for Championship club Persipura Jayapura.

== Club career ==
=== Persipura Jayapura ===
He was signed for Persipura Jayapura to play in Liga 1 in the 2017 season. Wamiau made his professional debut on 7 May 2017 in a match against Persib Bandung at the Gelora Bandung Lautan Api Stadium, Bandung.

=== Arema ===
In 2018, Wamiau signed a contract with Indonesian Liga 1 club Arema. He made his league debut on 9 April 2018 in a match against Borneo at the Segiri Stadium, Samarinda.

=== Return to Persipura Jayapura ===
In 2019, it was confirmed that Israel Wamiau would re-join Persipura Jayapura, signing a year contract. Wamiau made his league debut on 23 August 2019 in a match against Barito Putera at the Demang Lehman Stadium, Martapura.

=== Persita Tengerang ===
Wamiau was signed for Persita Tangerang to play in Liga 1 in the 2022–23 season. He made his league debut on 14 August 2022 in a match against Persis Solo at the Indomilk Arena, Tangerang.

== Career statistics ==
=== Club ===
As of match played 21 December 2024

Club	Season	League			Cup		Continental		Other		Total	
Club	Season	Division	Apps	Goals	Apps	Goals	Apps	Goals	Apps	Goals	Apps	Goals
Persipura Jayapura	2017	Liga 1	1	0	0	0	–		0	0	1	0
Arema	2018	Liga 1	12	0	0	0	–		0	0	12	0
Persipura Jayapura	2019	Liga 1	10	0	0	0	–		0	0	10	0
Persipura Jayapura	2020	Liga 1	3	0	0	0	–		0	0	3	0
Persipura Jayapura	2021–22	Liga 1	16	0	0	0	–		0	0	16	0
Persita Tangerang	2022–23	Liga 1	1	0	0	0	–		1 (Note: Appearances in Indonesia President's Cup)	0	2	0
Persipura Jayapura	2022–23	Liga 2	0	0	0	0	–		0	0	0	0
PSBS Biak	2023–24	Liga 2	6	0	0	0	–		0	0	6	0
Persipa Pati	2024–25	Liga 2	5	0	0	0	–		0	0	5	0
Persibo Bojonegoro	2024–25	Liga 2	1	0	0	0	–		0	0	1	0
Career total			55	0	0	0	0	0	1	0	56	0

== Honours ==
PSBS Biak

- Liga 2: 2023–24
