= Ahmad Hardianto =

Indonesian footballer

Ahmad Nur Hardianto
Personal information
- Full name: Ahmad Nur Hardianto
- Date of birth: 8 March 1995 (age 31)
- Place of birth: Lamongan, Indonesia
- Height: 1.78 m (5 ft 10 in)
- Position: Forward

Team information
- Current team: Persita Tangerang
- Number: 9

Youth career
- 2010–2016: Persela Lamongan

Senior career*
Years	Team	Apps	(Gls)
2016–2017	Persela Lamongan	7	(1)
2018–2019	Arema	30	(8)
2020–2021	Bhayangkara	0	(0)
2021–2022	Persita Tangerang	27	(5)
2022–2024	Borneo Samarinda	40	(5)
2024–	Persita Tangerang	45	(6)

International career
2017	Indonesia	1	(1)
- * Club domestic league appearances and goals as of 16 May 2026

Ahmad Nur Hardianto (born 8 March 1995, in Lamongan) is an Indonesian professional footballer who plays as a forward for Super League club Persita Tangerang.

== International career ==
He made his international debut for senior team on 21 March 2017, scoring one goal against Myanmar.

== Career statistics ==
=== Club ===
As of match played 16 May 2026

Club	Season	League			Cup (Note: Includes Piala Indonesia)		Other (Note: Appearances in Indonesia President's Cup)		Total	
Club	Season	Division	Apps	Goals	Apps	Goals	Apps	Goals	Apps	Goals
Persela Lamongan	2016	ISC A	6	1	0	0	0	0	6	1
Persela Lamongan	2017	Liga 1	1	0	0	0	3	2	4	2
Persela Lamongan	Total		7	1	0	0	3	2	10	3
Arema	2018	Liga 1	15	5	0	0	1	1	16	6
Arema	2019	Liga 1	15	3	0	0	6	2	21	5
Arema	Total		30	8	0	0	7	3	37	11
Bhayangkara	2020	Liga 1	0	0	0	0	0	0	0	0
Persita Tangerang	2021–22	Liga 1	27	5	0	0	3 (Note: Appearances in Menpora Cup)	0	30	5
Borneo	2022–23	Liga 1	25	4	0	0	7	0	32	4
Borneo	2023–24	Liga 1	15	1	0	0	0	0	15	1
Borneo	Total		40	5	0	0	7	0	47	5
Persita Tangerang	2024–25	Liga 1	24	3	0	0	0	0	24	3
Persita Tangerang	2025–26	Super League	21	3	0	0	0	0	21	3
Career total			149	25	0	0	20	5	169	30

=== International ===
As of match played 21 March 2017

Appearances and goals by national team and year
National team	Year	Apps	Goals
Indonesia	2017	1	1
Total		1	1

=== International goals ===
Indonesia

#	Date	Venue	Opponent	Score	Result	Competition
1.	21 March 2017	Pakansari Stadium, Bogor, Indonesia	Myanmar	1–0	1–3	Friendly

== Honours ==
Arema

- Piala Presiden: 2019

Borneo

- Piala Presiden runner-up: 2022
