= Gajayana Stadium =

Stadium in Indonesia

- Stadion Gajayana
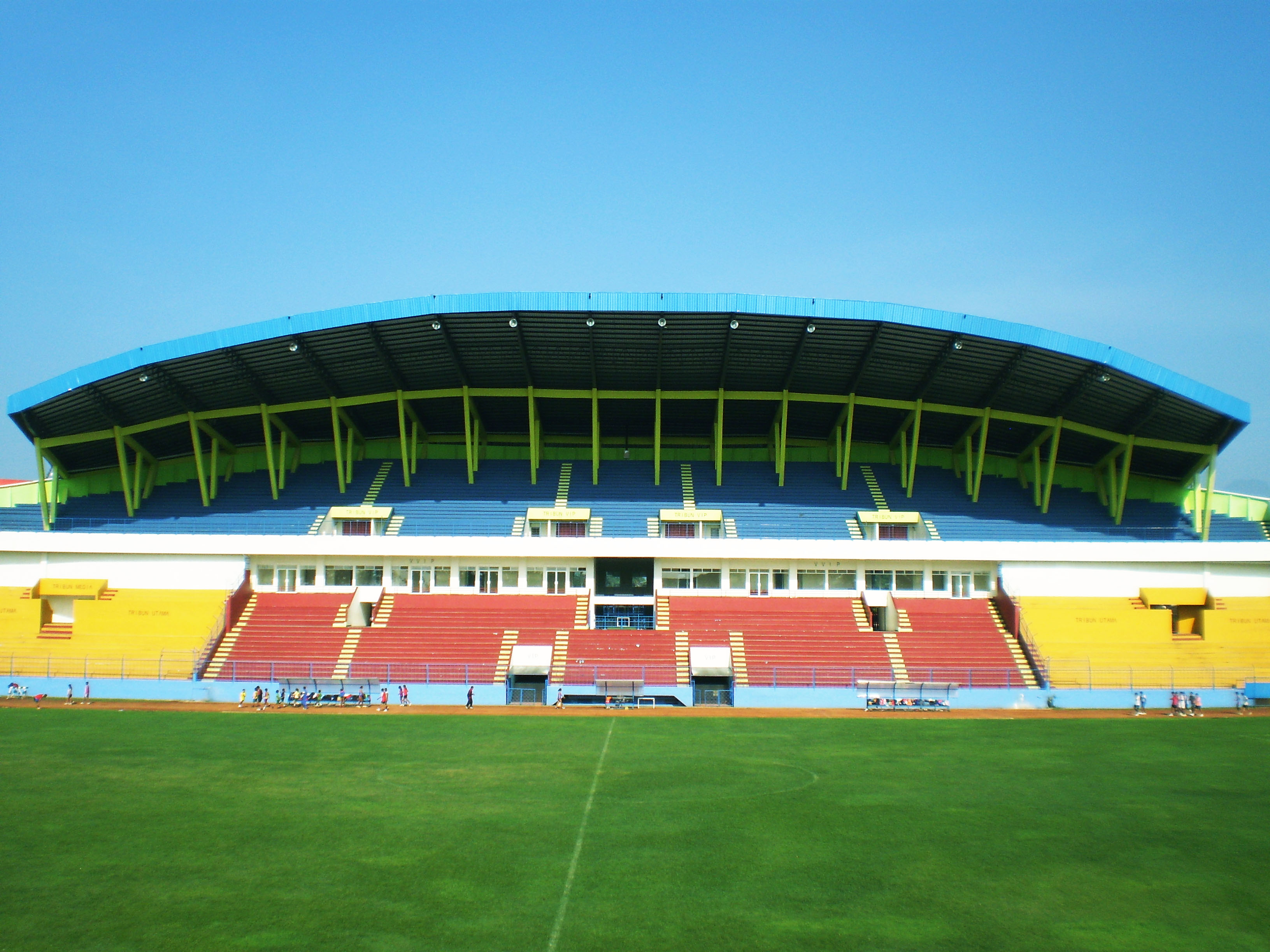
- Interactive map of Gajayana Stadium
- Location: Malang, East Java
- Coordinates: 7°58′32″S 112°37′30″E
- Owner: Malang Government
- Capacity: 25,000
- Surface: Bermuda grass

Construction
- Built: 1924
- Opened: 1926
- Renovated: 1990, 2008, 2025
- Architect: Dutch East Indies Government

Tenants
- Persema Malang (1953–present); Arema (1987–2004, 2015–present)

Gajayana Stadium (Indonesian: Stadion Gajayana) is a multipurpose stadium in Malang, East Java, Indonesia. Gajayana Stadium is the oldest stadium in Indonesia. This stadium become the center of the city in 1924 until 1926. Then in the early 1990s Gajayana Stadium renovated, capacity to 17,000. In 2007, the area next to the Gajayana Stadium became MOG or Malang Olympic Garden, completed in 2008. In 2008, Gajayana Stadium was renovated again and its capacity increased to 25,000. It is used mostly for football matches and is home stadium of Persema Malang and Arema.

In early 2025, Gajayana Stadium underwent renovations in preparation for the 2025 East Java Provincial Sports Week. After the renovation, Gajayana Stadium underwent several such as on the construction of an eight-lane running track, painting the stands, and the front of the stadium. In addition, there are also improvements to the changing room and toilet facilities, as well as the installation of a new scoring board.
