= Nasir (footballer) =

Indonesian footballer

Personal information
- Date of birth: 8 October 1995 (age 31)
- Place of birth: Tuban, Indonesia
- Height: 1.70 m (5 ft 7 in)
- Positions: Left back; winger

Youth career
- 2014–2016: ASIFA
- 2016: Madura United

Senior career*
Years	Team	Apps	(Gls)
2015–2016	Persatu Tuban	3	(1)
2017–2019	Arema	23	(1)
2020–2021	Persebaya Surabaya	0	(0)
2021–2022	Persela Lamongan	19	(0)
2022–2024	Dewa United	15	(0)
2024–2025	Deltras	14	(0)
2025–2026	Persikad Depok	21	(0)
- * Club domestic league appearances and goals as of 25 April 2026

Nasir (born 8 October 1995) is an Indonesian professional footballer, mainly as a left back but also as a left winger.

== Club career ==
=== Arema FC ===
At first he was just following his selection at Arema FC, but when Ahmad Nufiandani joined PS TNI, Nasir also got a place to fill the slot for U-23 players. Nasir could follow the selection in Arema FC because it was recommended by former Arema FC players, Andi Robot. He was able to captivate the attention of the coaching team during the selection.

=== Persebaya Surabaya ===
He was signed for Persebaya Surabaya to play in the Liga 1 in the 2020 season. This season was suspended on 27 March 2020 due to the COVID-19 pandemic. The season was abandoned and was declared void on 20 January 2021.

=== Persela Lamongan ===
He was signed for Persela Lamongan to play in 2021 Menpora Cup and Liga 1 in the 2021 season. Nasir made his debut on 4 September 2021 in a match against PSIS Semarang at the Wibawa Mukti Stadium, Cikarang.

=== Dewa United ===
Nasir was signed for Dewa United to play in Liga 1 in the 2022–23 season. He made his debut on 1 October 2022 in a match against RANS Nusantara at the Indomilk Arena, Tangerang.

== Career statistics ==
=== Club ===
As of match played 25 April 2026

Club	Season	League			Cup (Note: Includes Piala Indonesia)		Continental		Other (Note: Appearances in Indonesia President's Cup)		Total	
Club	Season	Division	Apps	Goals	Apps	Goals	Apps	Goals	Apps	Goals	Apps	Goals
Persatu Tuban	2015	Premier Division	0	0	0	0	0	0	0	0	0	0
Persatu Tuban	2016	ISC B	3	1	0	0	0	0	0	0	3	1
Persatu Tuban	Total		3	1	0	0	0	0	0	0	3	1
Arema	2017	Liga 1	5	0	0	0	0	0	7	0	12	0
Arema	2018	Liga 1	6	0	0	0	0	0	0	0	6	0
Arema	2019	Liga 1	12	1	0	0	0	0	1	0	13	1
Arema	Total		23	1	0	0	0	0	8	0	31	1
Persebaya Surabaya	2020	Liga 1	0	0	0	0	0	0	0	0	0	0
Persela Lamongan	2021–22	Liga 1	19	0	0	0	0	0	2 (Note: Appearances in Menpora Cup)	0	21	0
Dewa United	2022–23	Liga 1	4	0	0	0	–		1	0	5	0
Dewa United	2023–24	Liga 1	11	0	0	0	–		0	0	11	0
Deltras	2024–25	Liga 2	14	0	0	0	0	0	0	0	14	0
Persikad Depok	2025–26	Championship	21	0	0	0	–		0	0	21	0
Career total			95	2	0	0	0	0	10	0	105	2

== Honours ==
=== Club ===
Arema

- Indonesia President's Cup: 2017, 2019

Persebaya Surabaya

- East Java Governor Cup: 2020
