= Rivaldi Bawuo =

Indonesian footballer (born 1993)

Personal information
- Full name: Rivaldi Bawuo
- Date of birth: 13 August 1993 (age 33)
- Place of birth: Gorontalo, Indonesia
- Height: 1.72 m (5 ft 8 in)
- Position: Forward

Team information
- Current team: Persibo Bojonegoro

Senior career*
Years	Team	Apps	(Gls)
2014–2015	Persigo Gorontalo	12	(2)
2016–2017	Kalteng Putra	20	(17)
2018–2019	Arema	49	(10)
2020–2021	Madura United	0	(0)
2021	Persebaya Surabaya	0	(0)
2021–2022	Persis Solo	12	(4)
2022	→ PSS Sleman (loan)	11	(0)
2022–2023	Madura United	15	(0)
2023–2024	Sriwijaya	18	(5)
2024–2025	Persela Lamongan	11	(0)
2025–2026	RANS Nusantara	12	(3)
2026–	Persibo Bojonegoro	0	(0)
- * Club domestic league appearances and goals as of 8 February 2026 (UTC)

Rivaldi Bawuo (born 13 August 1993) is an Indonesian professional footballer who plays as a forward for Liga Nusantara club Persibo Bojonegoro.

== Club career ==
=== Kalteng Putra ===
In the 2017 season, Rivaldi Played for Kalteng Putra in 2017 Liga 2. On 27 July, in a match against PS Mojokerto Putra, he scored a hattrick as his team eased to a 4–1 triumph. He finished the league as a top scorer with 17 goals, but he failed to gain a promotion to Liga 1 with his club as they failed to secure a semi final spot in Group X 2017 Liga 2.

=== Arema F.C. ===
In December 2017, Rivaldi Bawuo moved from Kalteng Putra to Arema to play in Indonesian top flight Liga 1. He made his debut for Arema on 9 April 2018 against Borneo Samarinda in 2018 Liga 1, playing as a substitute for Bagas Adi.

=== Madura United ===
On 4 January 2020, Rivaldi Bawuo moved from Arema to Madura United. This season was suspended on 27 March 2020 due to the COVID-19 pandemic. The season was abandoned and was declared void on 20 January 2021.

=== Persis Solo ===
In 2021, Rivaldi Bawuo signed a contract with Indonesian Liga 2 club Persis Solo. He made his league debut on 5 October against Persijap Jepara at the Manahan Stadium, Surakarta.

==== PSS Sleman (loan) ====
In January 2022, Rivaldi signed a contract with Liga 1 club PSS Sleman on loan from Persis Solo. He made his league debut in a 2–0 loss against Arema on 13 January 2022 as a substitute for Wander Luiz in the 84th minute at the Kapten I Wayan Dipta Stadium, Gianyar.

=== Return to Madura United ===
In May 2022, Bawuo returned to Madura United on a year contract. He made his league debut on 23 July 2022 in a match against Barito Putera at the Gelora Ratu Pamelingan Stadium, Pamekasan.

== Career statistics ==
=== Club ===
As of match played 8 February 2026

Club	Season	League			Cup (Note: Includes Piala Indonesia)		Continental		Other (Note: Appearances in Indonesia President's Cup)		Total	
Club	Season	Division	Apps	Goals	Apps	Goals	Apps	Goals	Apps	Goals	Apps	Goals
Persigo Gorontalo	2014	Premier Division	12	2	0	0	0	0	0	0	12	2
Persigo Gorontalo	2015	Premier Division	0	0	0	0	0	0	0	0	0	0
Persigo Gorontalo	Total		12	2	0	0	0	0	0	0	12	2
Kalteng Putra	2017	Liga 2	20	17	0	0	0	0	0	0	20	17
Arema	2018	Liga 1	24	5	0	0	0	0	2	0	26	5
Arema	2019	Liga 1	25	5	2	0	0	0	4	0	31	5
Arema	Total		49	10	2	0	0	0	6	0	57	10
Madura United	2020	Liga 1	0	0	0	0	0	0	0	0	0	0
Persebaya Surabaya	2021–22	Liga 1	0	0	0	0	0	0	4 (Note: Appearances in Menpora Cup)	0	4	0
Persis Solo	2021	Liga 2	12	4	0	0	0	0	0	0	12	4
PSS Sleman (loan)	2021–22	Liga 1	11	0	0	0	0	0	0	0	11	0
Madura United	2022–23	Liga 1	15	0	0	0	–		3	0	18	0
Sriwijaya	2023–24	Liga 2	18	5	0	0	–		0	0	18	5
Persela Lamongan	2024–25	Liga 2	11	0	0	0	–		0	0	11	0
RANS Nusantara	2025–26	Liga Nusantara	12	3	0	0	–		0	0	12	3
Career total			160	41	2	0	0	0	13	0	175	41

== Honours ==
=== Club ===
Arema

- Indonesia President's Cup: 2019

Persis Solo

- Liga 2: 2021

RANS Nusantara

- Liga Nusantara: 2025–26

=== Individual ===
- Liga 2 Top Goalscorer: 2017
