= Dalmiansyah Matutu =

Indonesian association football player

Personal information
- Full name: Dalmiansyah Matutu
- Date of birth: 14 October 1996 (age 30)
- Place of birth: Bandar Lampung, Indonesia
- Height: 1.70 m (5 ft 7 in)
- Position: Attacking midfielder

Team information
- Current team: Persitara North Jakarta
- Number: 24

Youth career
- 2010–2011: SSB Bintang Junior Palas
- 2010–2013: Persilas South Lampung
- 2011–2017: Arema

Senior career*
Years	Team	Apps	(Gls)
2017–2019	Arema	1	(0)
2019–2020	Badak Lampung	6	(0)
2021	Sulut United	0	(0)
2021	Badak Lampung	2	(0)
2022–2023	Persikabo 1973	1	(0)
2024–2025	Persikabo 1973	12	(1)
2026–	Persitara North Jakarta	1	(0)
- * Club domestic league appearances and goals as of 17 November 2026

Dalmiansyah Matutu (born 14 October 1996) is an Indonesian professional footballer who plays as an attacking midfielder for Liga Nusantara club Persitara North Jakarta.

== Club career ==
=== Badak Lampung ===
In 2019, Dalmiansyah signed a contract with Indonesian Liga 1 club Badak Lampung. He made his league debut on 10 July 2019 in a match against Persipura Jayapura at the Mandala Stadium, Jayapura.

=== Sulut United ===
He was signed for Sulut United to play in Liga 2 in the 2021 season.

=== Return to Badak Lampung ===
In 2021, Dalmiansyah Matutu signed a contract with Indonesian Liga 2 club Badak Lampung. He made his league debut on 4 October against PSKC Cimahi at the Gelora Bung Karno Madya Stadium, Jakarta.
