= Hanif Sjahbandi =

Indonesian footballer

Personal information
- Full name: Hanif Abdurrauf Sjahbandi
- Date of birth: 7 April 1997 (age 29)
- Place of birth: Bandung, Indonesia
- Height: 1.82 m (6 ft 0 in)
- Position: Midfielder

Team information
- Current team: Arema
- Number: 17

Youth career
- 2010–2012: Indonesia Football Academy
- 2012–2013: Jove Español
- 2013–2014: S.S. Reyes
- 2014–2015: Persib Bandung

Senior career*
Years	Team	Apps	(Gls)
2015–2016	Persipasi Bandung Raya	7	(0)
2016	Persiba Balikpapan	12	(1)
2017–2022	Arema	84	(5)
2022–2026	Persija Jakarta	98	(6)
2026–	Arema	0	(0)

International career
2016	Indonesia U19	5	(0)
2017–2019	Indonesia U23	15	(1)
2017–2019	Indonesia	7	(0)
Medal record
Men's football
Representing Indonesia
Southeast Asian Games
Bronze medal – third place	2017 Kuala Lumpur	Team
AFF U-22 Youth Championship
Winner	2019 Cambodia	Team
- * Club domestic league appearances and goals as of 11 January 2026

Hanif Abdurrauf Sjahbandi (born 7 April 1997) is an Indonesian professional footballer who plays as a midfielder for Super League club Arema.

== Early career ==
His parents first enrolled Hanif into the Asian Soccer Academy (ASA) but found it unsatisfactory and eventually established their own football school called TwoTouch Football Academy to develop their child's talents. In July 2009, Hanif participated in a Manchester United Soccer School (MUSS) summer course in Indonesia, in which he was selected as one of the best students in his age group (12). That led him to an invitation to participate in MUSS's World Skills Final in December 2009.

== Club career ==
=== Persipasi Bandung Raya ===
Hanif's professional career started when he joined Persipasi Bandung Raya in the 2015 Indonesia President's Cup, a year before the club changed owners and became Madura United. Playing as an energetic midfielder, Hanif emerged as one of the young players who attracted public attention. After this tournament, agents took him overseas to follow training in several clubs, including J1 League club FC Tokyo.

=== Persiba Balikpapan ===
After his overseas training stints, Hanif in 2016 returned to Indonesia and joined Persiba Balikpapan. Persiba at that time participated in the 2016 Indonesia Soccer Championship A, a competition that replaced the abandoned 2015 Indonesia Super League. He made his first goal when Persiba went against Persegres Gresik United on 26 October 2016, in week 26 of the championship.

=== Arema F.C. ===
After the ISC evolved into Indonesia's current top-tier football league, Liga 1, in 2017, Hanif joined Arema, which initially contracted him for two years. He was recommended by coach Aji Santoso to replace Dutch-born Indonesia national football team regular Raphael Maitimo. Despite the cancellation of the 2020 Liga 1 competition due to the COVID-19 pandemic that led to a year of no professional football activities in Indonesia, Arema kept Hanif who has grown into an important part of its midfield.

=== Persija Jakarta ===
Hanif was signed for Persija Jakarta to play in Liga 1 in the 2022–23 season. He made his league debut on 31 July 2022 in a match against Persis Solo at the Patriot Candrabaga Stadium, Bekasi.

=== Return to Arema F.C. ===
On 18 September 2026, Hanif officially returned to Arema on a free transfer.

== International career ==
Hanif was among the 23 players called up for the Indonesia U-19 team that played in the 2014 AFF U-19 Youth Championship in Vietnam. While the team lost all of their group matches, Hanif emerged into a player who regularly won calls for subsequent junior-level national teams. Hanif made his international debut for the senior team on 21 March 2017 in a friendly match against Myanmar.

== Career statistics ==
=== Club ===
As of match played 3 November 2026

Club	Season	League			Cup (Note: Includes Piala Indonesia)		League cup (Note: Includes I-League Cup.)		Continental		Other		Total	
Club	Season	Division	Apps	Goals	Apps	Goals	Apps	Goals	Apps	Goals	Apps	Goal	Apps	Goal
Persiba Balikpapan	2016	ISC A	12	1	0	0	0	0	—		0	0	12	1
Arema	2017	Liga 1	14	0	0	0	0	0	—		6 (Note: Appearance(s) in Piala Presiden)	1	20	1
Arema	2018	Liga 1	19	2	0	0	0	0	—		3	0	22	2
Arema	2019	Liga 1	21	2	0	0	0	0	—		5	1	26	3
Arema	2020	Liga 1	2	0	0	0	0	0	—		0	0	2	0
Arema	2021–22	Liga 1	28	1	0	0	0	0	—		3 (Note: Appearances in Menpora Cup)	0	31	1
Arema	Total		84	5	0	0	0	0	—		17	2	101	7
Persija Jakarta	2022–23	Liga 1	28	1	0	0	0	0	—		2	0	30	1
Persija Jakarta	2023–24	Liga 1	26	3	0	0	0	0	—		0	0	26	3
Persija Jakarta	2024–25	Liga 1	33	2	0	0	0	0	—		4	1	37	3
Persija Jakarta	2025–26	Super League	11	0	0	0	0	0	—		0	0	11	0
Persija Jakarta	Total		98	6	0	0	0	0	—		6	1	104	7
Arema	2026–27	Super League	0	0	0	0	1	1	—		0	0	1	1
Career total			194	12	0	0	1	1	—		23	3	218	16

=== International ===
As of match played 10 October 2019

Appearances and goals by national team and year
National team	Year	Apps	Goals
Indonesia	2017	4	0
Indonesia	2018	2	0
Indonesia	2019	1	0
Total		7	0

=== International goals ===
International under-23 goals

Goal	Date	Venue	Opponent	Score	Result	Competition
1	20 August 2018	Patriot Candrabhaga Stadium, Bekasi, Indonesia	Hong Kong	3–1	3–1	2018 Asian Games

== Honours ==
=== Club ===
Arema

- Piala Presiden: 2017, 2019

=== International ===
Indonesia U-23

- SEA Games bronze medal: 2017
- AFF U-22 Youth Championship: 2019

Indonesia

- Aceh World Solidarity Cup runner-up: 2017
