= Dedik Setiawan =

Indonesian footballer

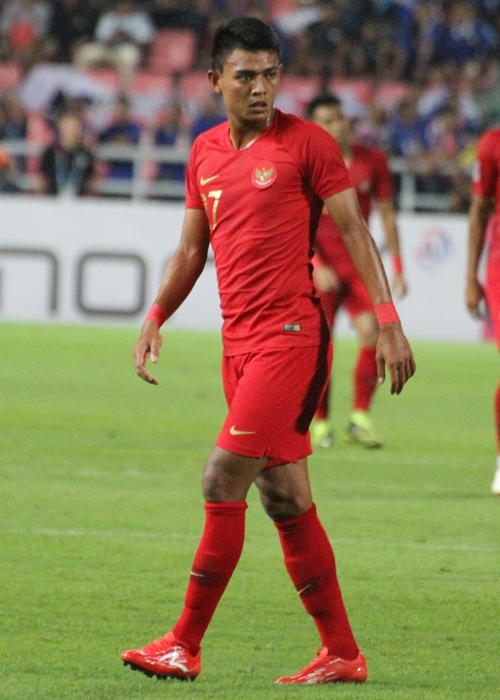
- Dedik playing for Indonesia at the 2018 AFF Championship

Personal information
- Full name: Dedik Setiawan
- Date of birth: 27 June 1994 (age 32)
- Place of birth: Malang, Indonesia
- Height: 1.77 m (5 ft 10 in)
- Position: Forward

Team information
- Current team: RANS Nusantara
- Number: 27

Youth career
- 2010–2011: SSB Sinar Mas
- 2011–2013: Persekam Metro

Senior career*
Years	Team	Apps	(Gls)
2014–2016	Persekam Metro	20	(10)
2016–2026	Arema	191	(45)
2026–	RANS Nusantara	1	(1)

International career
2018–2022	Indonesia	15	(0)
Medal record
Men's football
Representing Indonesia
AFF Championship
Runner-up	2020 Singapore	Team
- * Club domestic league appearances and goals as of 13 September 2026

Dedik Setiawan (born 27 June 1994) is an Indonesian professional footballer who plays as a forward for Championship club RANS Nusantara. Dedik plays mainly as a striker, but he has also been deployed as a wide forward.

== Club career ==
=== Early career ===
In 2011, he joined Persekam Metro junior, who at that time drove him in the team Porprov Malang regency. and in 2016, he was loaned for joined by Arema to take part in a test match against Cepu All Star on 15 October 2016. He scored twice and carried Arema to a 3–2 victory.

=== Arema ===
In 2016, Dedik registered to the selection player of Arema. Club was looking for a backup striker at the time. He joined Arema in the second round of 2016 Indonesia Soccer Championship A. He made his first-team debut for Arema in the 2016 Indonesia Soccer Championship A match against Perseru Serui on 13 November 2016, which Arema lost 0–1. Where he coming in the 65th minute replacing Febri Setiadi Hamzah. His first goal for Arema was in a 2–0 win against Bhayangkara at home in the 2017 Liga 1. On 2019 league season, he experienced anterior cruciate ligament injury which affected to his current not optimal performance in the match. Before his injury, Dedik was known as a decent striker. On 10 June 2026, Dedik officially parted ways with Arema after playing for the club for 10 years.

== International career ==
His debut for Indonesia was on 11 September 2018 in a friendly against Mauritius as a substitute.

== Career statistics ==
=== Club ===
As of match played 13 September 2026

Club	Season	League			Cup (Note: Includes Piala Indonesia)		Continental		Other (Note: Appearances in Piala Presiden)		Total	
Club	Season	Division	Apps	Goals	Apps	Goals	Apps	Goals	Apps	Goals	Apps	Goals
Persekam Metro	2014	Premier Division	12	2	0	0	—		0	0	12	2
Persekam Metro	2015	Premier Division	0	0	0	0	—		0	0	0	0
Persekam Metro	2016	ISC B	8	8	0	0	—		0	0	8	8
Persekam Metro	Total		20	10	0	0	—		0	0	20	10
Arema	2016	ISC A	3	0	0	0	—		0	0	3	0
Arema	2017	Liga 1	28	6	0	0	—		3	0	31	6
Arema	2018	Liga 1	26	10	2	2	—		4	0	32	12
Arema	2019	Liga 1	11	7	2	1	—		6	4	19	12
Arema	2020	Liga 1	0	0	0	0	—		0	0	0	0
Arema	2021–22	Liga 1	24	1	0	0	—		3 (Note: Appearances in Menpora Cup)	2	27	3
Arema	2022–23	Liga 1	28	9	0	0	—		4	0	32	9
Arema	2023–24	Liga 1	32	9	0	0	—		0	0	32	9
Arema	2024–25	Liga 1	28	3	0	0	—		5	1	33	4
Arema	2025–26	Super League	11	0	0	0	—		2	1	13	1
Arema	Total		191	45	4	3	—		27	8	222	56
RANS Nusantara	2026–27	Championship	1	1	0	0	—		0	0	1	1
Career total			212	56	4	3	0	0	27	8	243	67

=== International appearances ===
As of match played 30 January 2022

Appearances and goals by national team and year
National team	Year	Apps	Goals
Indonesia	2018	5	0
Indonesia	2019	2	0
Indonesia	2020	0	0
Indonesia	2021	5	0
Indonesia	2022	3	0
Total		15	0

== Honours ==
=== Club ===
Arema

- Piala Presiden: 2017, 2019, 2022, 2024

=== International ===
Indonesia

- AFF Championship runner-up: 2020
