= Utam Rusdiana =

Indonesian footballer

Personal information
- Full name: Utam Rusdiana
- Date of birth: 6 March 1995 (age 31)
- Place of birth: Sidoarjo, Indonesia
- Height: 1.82 m (6 ft 0 in)
- Position: Goalkeeper

Team information
- Current team: Persikab Bandung
- Number: 93

Youth career
- 2012–2014: Arema

Senior career*
| Years | Team | Apps | (Gls) |
| 2014–2022 | Arema | 37 | (0) |
| 2021 | → Persekat Tegal (loan) | 5 | (0) |
| 2022 | Dewa United | 0 | (0) |
| 2024– | Persikab Bandung | 5 | (0) |
- * Club domestic league appearances and goals as of 11 January 2025

Utam Rusdiana (born 6 March 1995) is an Indonesian professional footballer who plays as a goalkeeper for Liga Nusantara club Persikab Bandung.

== Club career ==
=== Persekat Tegal ===
In 2021, Rusdiana signed a contract with Indonesian Liga 2 club Persekat Tegal. He made his league debut on 27 September in a 3–1 win against Badak Lampung at the Gelora Bung Karno Madya Stadium, Jakarta.

=== Dewa United ===
Rusdiana was signed for Dewa United to play in Liga 1 in the 2022–23 season.

== Career statistics ==
=== Club ===
As of match played 11 January 2025

| Club | Season | League | | | Cup (Note: Includes Piala Indonesia.) | | Continental | | Total | |
| Club | Season | Division | Apps | Goals | Apps | Goals | Apps | Goals | Apps | Goals |
|---|---|---|---|---|---|---|---|---|---|---|
| Arema | 2015 | Indonesia Super League | 0 | 0 | 0 | 0 | 0 | 0 | 0 | 0 |
| Arema | 2016 | ISC A | 0 | 0 | 0 | 0 | 0 | 0 | 0 | 0 |
| Arema | 2017 | Liga 1 | 6 | 0 | 0 | 0 | 0 | 0 | 6 | 0 |
| Arema | 2018 | Liga 1 | 18 | 0 | 0 | 0 | 0 | 0 | 18 | 0 |
| Arema | 2019 | Liga 1 | 13 | 0 | 2 | 0 | 0 | 0 | 15 | 0 |
| Arema | 2020 | Liga 1 | 0 | 0 | 0 | 0 | 0 | 0 | 0 | 0 |
| Arema | 2021–22 | Liga 1 | 0 | 0 | 0 | 0 | 0 | 0 | 0 | 0 |
| Arema | Total | | 37 | 0 | 2 | 0 | 0 | 0 | 39 | 0 |
| Persekat Tegal (loan) | 2021 | Liga 2 | 5 | 0 | 0 | 0 | 0 | 0 | 5 | 0 |
| Dewa United | 2022–23 | Liga 1 | 0 | 0 | 0 | 0 | 0 | 0 | 0 | 0 |
| Persikab Bandung | 2024–25 | Liga Nusantara | 5 | 0 | 0 | 0 | 0 | 0 | 5 | 0 |
| Career total | | | 47 | 0 | 2 | 0 | 0 | 0 | 49 | 0 |

== Honours ==
=== Clubs ===
Arema

- Indonesian Inter Island Cup: 2014/15
- Indonesia President's Cup: 2017, 2019
