= Johan Alfarizi =

Indonesian footballer

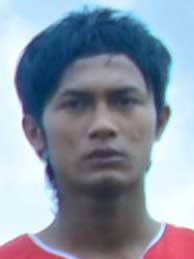
- Alfarizi with Arema in 2010

Personal information
- Full name: Johan Ahmat Farizi
- Date of birth: 25 May 1990 (age 36)
- Place of birth: Malang, Indonesia
- Height: 1.73 m (5 ft 8 in)
- Position: Left-back

Team information
- Current team: Arema
- Number: 87

Youth career
- 2007–2009: Arema Indonesia

Senior career*
Years	Team	Apps	(Gls)
2009–	Arema	316	(16)
2013	→ Persija Jakarta (loan)	16	(1)

International career
2011–2013	Indonesia U23	3	(0)
2015–2017	Indonesia	3	(0)
Medal record
Men's football
Representing Indonesia
Islamic Solidarity Games
Silver medal – second place	2013 Palembang	Team
- * Club domestic league appearances and goals as of 20 November 2026

Johan Ahmat Farizi (born 25 May 1990 in Malang, East Java) is an Indonesian professional footballer who plays as a left-back and captains for Super League club Arema.

== Career statistics ==
=== International appearances ===
As of match played 17 November 2017

Appearances and goals by national team and year
Indonesia national team
Year	Apps	Goals
2015	2	0
2016	0	0
2017	1	0
Total	3	0

== Honours ==
=== Club ===
Arema

- Indonesia Super League: 2009–10
- East Java Governor Cup: 2013
- Indonesian Inter Island Cup: 2014/15
- Piala Presiden: 2017, 2019, 2022, 2024

=== International ===
Indonesia U-23

- Islamic Solidarity Games silver medal: 2013

=== Individual ===
- Liga 1 Team of the Season: 2021–22
