= Arthur Cunha =

Brazilian footballer (born 1990)

Personal information
- Full name: Arthur Cunha da Rocha
- Date of birth: 10 January 1990 (age 36)
- Place of birth: Rio de Janeiro, Brazil
- Height: 1.88 m (6 ft 2 in)
- Position: Centre-back

Youth career
- 2005–2008: Fluminense
- 2007: → Manchester United

Senior career*
Years	Team	Apps	(Gls)
2009–2011	Desportivo Brasil	32	(4)
2009–2010	→ Estoril Praia (loan)	8	(0)
2011–2012	Boavista	14	(0)
2012–2013	Duque de Caxias	5	(0)
2013–2014	Tupi	3	(0)
2014	Uberaba	17	(3)
2014–2015	Mamore	0	(0)
2015–2016	Mitra Kukar	26	(3)
2016–2020	Arema	84	(4)
2020	→ Persipura (loan)	2	(0)
2020–2021	Sliema Wanderers	4	(0)
2021	Negeri Sembilan	0	(0)
Total		195	(14)
- * Club domestic league appearances and goals

Arthur Cunha da Rocha (born 10 January 1990) is a Brazilian former professional footballer who plays as a centre-back.

== Early career ==
Cunha trained at Manchester United in 2007. He underwent tests with the U-17 team, having previously trained in the junior team Fluminense.

== Honours ==
Estoril Praia

- Liga Intercalar: 2009–10

Duque de Caxias

- Copa Rio: 2013

Mitra Kukar

- General Sudirman Cup: 2015

Arema

- Indonesia President's Cup: 2017, 2019

Negeri Sembilan

- Malaysia Premier League: 2021
