= Hamka Hamzah =

Indonesian footballer

Personal information
- Full name: Hamka Hamzah
- Date of birth: 29 January 1984 (age 42)
- Place of birth: Makassar, Indonesia
- Height: 1.83 m (6 ft 0 in)
- Position: Centre-back

Youth career
- 2000–2001: PSM Makassar

Senior career*
Years	Team	Apps	(Gls)
2001–2002	PSM Makassar	12	(0)
2002–2003	Persebaya Surabaya	20	(1)
2003–2005	Persik Kediri	50	(2)
2005–2008	Persija Jakarta	62	(5)
2008–2009	Persik Kediri	32	(3)
2009–2010	Persisam Putra Samarinda	20	(5)
2010–2011	Persipura Jayapura	19	(1)
2011–2013	Mitra Kukar	56	(5)
2013–2014	PKNS	20	(5)
2014–2015	Borneo	23	(7)
2015–2016	Arema Cronus	30	(9)
2017	PSM Makassar	30	(4)
2018	Sriwijaya	15	(4)
2018–2019	Arema	45	(4)
2020–2021	Persita Tangerang	3	(0)
2021–2022	RANS Cilegon	15	(2)
2022	Bekasi City	7	(2)
2023–2024	RANS Nusantara	4	(0)
Total		463	(59)

International career
2002	Indonesia U21	8	(0)
2004–2014	Indonesia	32	(0)

Managerial career
- 2021–2022: RANS Cilegon (Assistant)
- 2023–2025: RANS Nusantara (Manager)
- 2026–: PSIS Semarang (Assistant)
Medal record
Men's football
Representing Indonesia
AFF Championship
Runner-up	2004 Vietnam & Malaysia	2004
Runner-up	2010 Indonesia & Vietnam	2010
- * Club domestic league appearances and goals

Hamka Hamzah (born 29 January 1984) is an Indonesian former professional footballer who played as a centre-back. In the past, he once played as a forward. Hamka also has one appearance as a goalkeeper in Persik Kediri.

== Biography ==
Hamka Hamzah played as a defender for the Indonesia national team at the 2010 AFF Championship tournament. His consistent play and fighting spirit has made Hamka Hamzah respected by opposing strikers.

Apart from PSM, Hamka has played for a number of big clubs in Indonesia, such as Persik Kediri, Arema Cronus, Persebaya, Persija, Persisam and Persipura. While at Persija, Hamka was one of Persija's most prolific goal scorers. Sergei Dubrovin, former Persija architect, praised that not many players have skills like Hamka. Because he was considered to have quite a big influence, Hamka was asked to become captain to replace Hendro Kartiko who left for Arema Malang.

== Club career ==
=== PSM Makassar ===
Hamka played for his hometown club, PSM Makassar for the 2017 League 1 competition. Hamka started his career with PSM Makassar Junior in 2001–2002. At that time he was 17 years old.

=== Persebaya Surabaya ===
After his debut with PSM Makassar, in 2002 he officially wore the Persebaya Surabaya uniform. There he appeared 20 times with 1 goal.

=== Persik Kediri ===
After just one season in Surabaya, he moved to Persik Kediri. At Persik he lasted almost 2 seasons with 50 appearances and 2 goals. In almost every team he plays for, Hamka always wears the jersey number 23 because it is his favorite number.

=== Persija Jakarta ===
In 2005, he officially joined the capital's team, Persija Jakarta.

With Persija Hamka could be said to be more productive as a defender, scoring 5 goals in 62 appearances. At Persija he almost spent three seasons, he returned to defend Persik Kediri for about one season.

After that, he played at several big clubs such as Persisam Samarinda, Persipura Jayapura, Mitra Kukar, PKNS, Pusamania Borneo and Arema Cronus. In Arema, he became a captain.

=== PKNS Selangor ===
Not only that, Hamka is also one of the Indonesian players who plays abroad. He was contracted at a staggering price by Malaysian club PKNS Selangor.

Hamka was appointed team captain, after which his play became more composed.

After moving from club to club, he finally returned to his hometown to strengthen and become captain of PSM Makassar in the continuation of the 2019 Liga 1 competition.

=== Bekasi City ===
On 1 July 2022, Hamka joined Liga 2 club, Bekasi City.

=== RANS Nusantara ===
Hamka while no longer active as a player, and became the manager for RANS Nusantara. On 17 March 2024, Hamka played his first game after two years, for RANS as player-manager against Bali United in a 1–1 draw.

== Honours ==
=== Club ===
Persebaya Surabaya

- Liga Indonesia First Division: 2003

Persija Jakarta

- Liga Indonesia Premier Division runner up: 2005
- Copa Indonesia runner-up: 2005

Persipura Jayapura

- Indonesia Super League: 2010–11

Sriwijaya

- East Kalimantan Governor Cup: 2018

Arema

- Indonesia President's Cup: 2019

RANS Cilegon

- Liga 2 runner-up: 2021

=== National team ===
Indonesia U-21

- Hassanal Bolkiah Trophy: 2002

Indonesia

- AFF Championship runner-up: 2004, 2010

=== Individual ===
- (Indonesia Soccer Championship A/Liga 1) Domestic League Top Tier Division Best XI (2): 2016, 2017
- Liga 2 Best XI: 2021
- Indonesia President's Cup Best Player: 2019
- Indonesian Soccer Awards: Best 11 2019
- Indonesian Soccer Awards: Best Defender 2019
