= Dendi Santoso =

Indonesian footballer

Personal information
- Full name: Dendi Santoso
- Date of birth: 16 May 1990 (age 36)
- Place of birth: Malang, Indonesia
- Height: 1.69 m (5 ft 7 in)
- Position: Winger

Team information
- Current team: Arema
- Number: 41

Youth career
- 1999−2003: SSB Unibraw 82
- 2004−2008: Arema

Senior career*
Years	Team	Apps	(Gls)
2008−	Arema	329	(21)

International career
2009−2013	Indonesia U23	9	(2)
2019	Indonesia	2	(0)
Medal record
Men's football
Representing Indonesia
Southeast Asian Games
Silver medal – second place	2013 Naypyidaw	Team
- * Club domestic league appearances and goals as of 10 May 2026

Dendi Santoso (born in Malang, East Java, 16 May 1990) is an Indonesian professional footballer who plays as a winger for Super League club Arema.

== International career ==
He made his debut for the Indonesia in the 2022 FIFA World Cup qualification against United Arab Emirates on 10 October 2019.

== Career statistics ==
=== Club ===
As of match played 3 November 2026

Appearances and goals by club, season and competition
Club	Season	League			Cup (Note: Includes Piala Indonesia)		Continental (Note: Appearances in AFC Cup, AFC Champions League)		Total	
Club	Season	Division	Apps	Goals	Apps	Goals	Apps	Goals	Apps	Goals
Arema	2008–09	Indonesia Super League	10	0	—		—		10	0
Arema	2009–10	Indonesia Super League	19	2	9	4	—		28	6
Arema	2010–11	Indonesia Super League	18	1	—		1	0	19	1
Arema	2011–12	Indonesia Super League	17	1	—		—		17	1
Arema	2013	Indonesia Super League	26	2	—		—		26	2
Arema	2014	Indonesia Super League	14	0	—		5	1	19	1
Arema	2015	Indonesia Super League	1	0	—		—		1	0
Arema	2016	ISC A	13	0	—		—		13	0
Arema	2017	Liga 1	30	3	—		—		30	3
Arema	2018	Liga 1	31	4	1	0	—		32	4
Arema	2019	Liga 1	29	4	2	0	—		31	4
Arema	2020	Liga 1	3	0	—		—		3	0
Arema	2021–22	Liga 1	30	3	—		—		30	3
Arema	2022–23	Liga 1	28	1	—		—		28	1
Arema	2023–24	Liga 1	32	0	—		—		32	0
Arema	2024–25	Liga 1	15	0	—		—		15	0
Arema	2025–26	Super League	13	0	—		—		13	0
Arema	2026–27	Super League	0	0	1	0	—		1	0
Career total			329	21	13	4	6	1	351	26

=== International appearances ===
As of match played 20 November 2019

Appearances and goals by national team and year
National team	Year	Apps	Goals
Indonesia	2019	2	0
Total		2	0

=== International goals ===
Dendi Santoso: International under-23 goals

Goal	Date	Venue	Opponent	Score	Result	Competition
1	22 November 2013	Gelora Bung Karno Stadium, Jakarta, Indonesia	Papua New Guinea U-23	1–0	6–0	2013 MNC Cup
2	24 November 2013	Gelora Bung Karno Stadium, Jakarta, Indonesia	Maldives U-23	2–1	2–1	2013 MNC Cup

== Honours ==
Arema

- Indonesia Super League: 2009–10
- Menpora Cup: 2013
- Indonesian Inter Island Cup: 2014/15
- Indonesia President's Cup: 2017, 2019, 2022, 2024
- Piala Indonesia runner-up: 2010

Indonesia U23

- SEA Games silver medal: 2013
