= Kanjuruhan Stadium =

Stadium in Malang Regency, Indonesia

- Stadion Kanjuruhan
- Interactive map of Kanjuruhan Stadium
- Location: Kepanjen, Malang Regency, East Java, Indonesia
- Coordinates: 08°09′01″S 112°34′26″E
- Owner: Malang Regency Government
- Operator: Arema
- Capacity: 21,603 Capacity history: 35,000 (2004–2014) 42,449 (2014–2022) 21,603 (2025–present)
- Surface: Zoysia matrella

Construction
- Groundbreaking: 1997
- Opened: 9 June 2004; 22 years ago
- Renovated: 2010, 2023–2024
- Closed: 2022–2024
- Reopened: 17 March 2025; 19 months ago
- Cost: >Rp 35 billion (at the time of building); Rp 350 billion (rebuilding)

Tenants
- Arema (2004–2022, 2025–present); Arema Putri (2019–2022); RANS Nusantara (2026–2027); Persekam Kabupaten Malang

Kanjuruhan Stadium (Indonesian: Stadion Kanjuruhan) is a multi-purpose stadium in Malang Regency, East Java, Indonesia. It was primarily used for football matches. The stadium held 21,603 spectators. It was the home ground of Arema, a football team in Liga 1, together with Persekam Metro Kabupaten Malang of the Liga 3. It was named after the Kingdom of Kanjuruhan, an 8th-century Hindu kingdom in present-day Malang.

== History ==
Kanjuruhan Stadium was built in 1997 with an estimated construction cost of Rp 35 billion. On 9 June 2004, the stadium was inaugurated for use by President Megawati Soekarnoputri, marked by a trial match in the middle of the 2004 Indonesian First League Division between Arema and PSS Sleman. The game ended in a 1–0 victory for Arema.

It was also renovated in 2010 for the 2011 AFC Champions League in terms of adding lighting power.

In the aftermath of the 2022 disaster, after meeting with FIFA President Gianni Infantino on 18 October 2022, President Joko Widodo issued orders to deactivate Kanjuruhan Stadium and demolish and rebuild the stadium according to FIFA standards. The rebuilding process was completed on 31 December 2024, costing Rp 350 billion, making Kanjuruhan Stadium the most expensive stadium ever built in Indonesia. Minister of Public Works Dody Hanggodo expected the stadium to be strong enough for 30 - 40 years.

On 17 March 2025, Kanjuruhan Stadium was officially reopened by President Prabowo Subianto along with 16 other renovated stadiums.

== Incidents ==
On 1 October 2022, at least 135 people were killed in a human crush during a stampede on the stadium. After the disaster, the stadium was renovated.

== Departments and facilities ==
Prior to its deactivation, Kanjuruhan Stadium was divided into several departments and facilities as follows:

- Football stadium
- Training field
- Transportation safety educational park
- Press conference and auditorium department
- Skating tracks
- Kanjuruhan indoor sport arena and basketball court
- Swimming pool
- Indoor swimming pool
- Outdoor swimming pool
- Wall climbing area
- Healthcare and mini ICU department
- Praying room and religious services department
- Culinary department.

Aside of the departments, Kanjuruhan Stadium complex also housed three offices:

- Office of Youth and Sports of Malang Regency
- Malang Regency branch of the National Sports Committee of Indonesia
- Government Education and Training Agency of Malang Regency

== Gallery ==
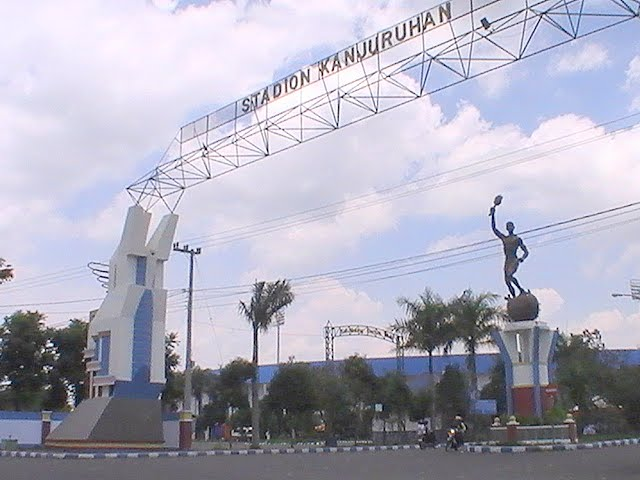
The entrance to the stadium.

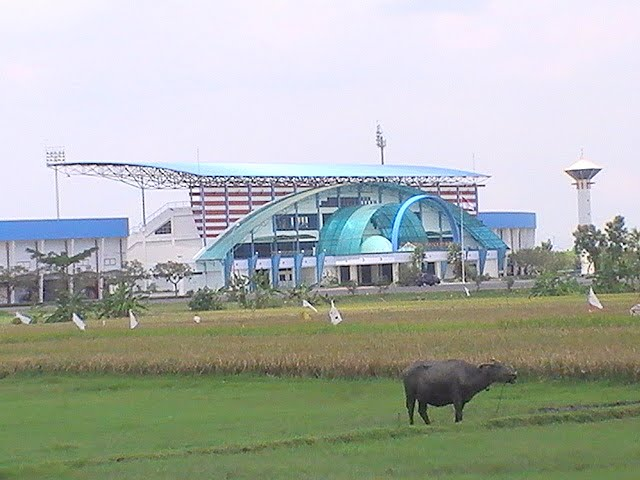
View of stadium from the rice fields.

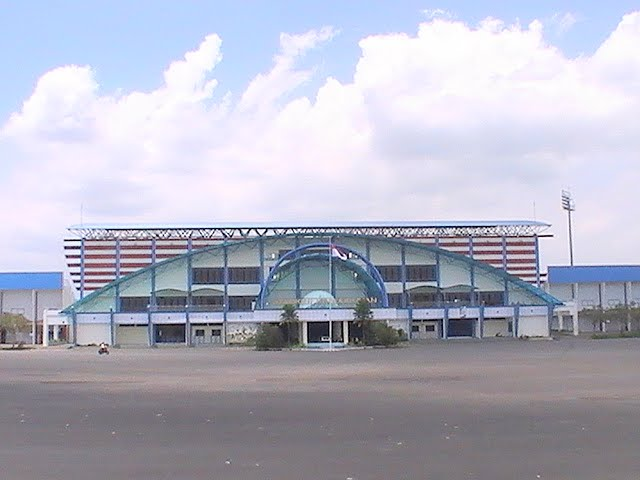
Stadium's exterior

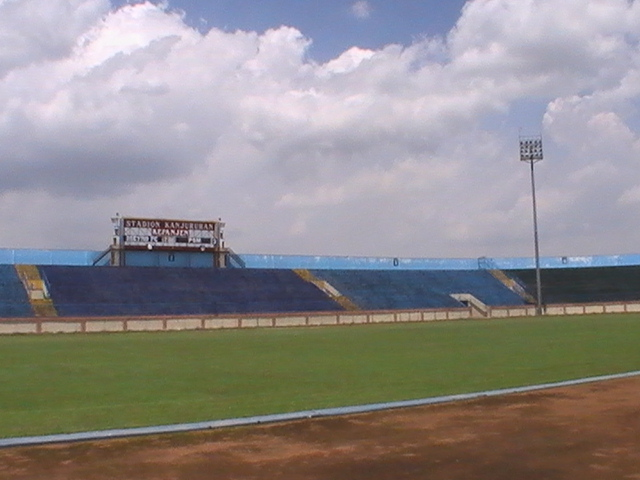
Stadium soccer field.

== See also ==
- Arema
- Arema Putri
- Persekam Metro
- List of stadiums in Indonesia
