= 2018 Sriwijaya F.C. season =

Sriwijaya
2018 season
- President: Dodi Reza Alex
- Club manager: Ucok Hidayat
- Head coach: Rahmad Darmawan (until 15 July 2018); Subangkit (started 26 July 2018)
- Stadium: Gelora Sriwijaya Jakabaring; Bumi Sriwijaya Stadium; Jakabaring Athletic Stadium
- Liga 1: 17th
- Piala Indonesia: First round
- Piala Presiden: 3rd
- Top goalscorer: League: Beto; Esteban Vizcarra (6); All: Manuchekhr Dzhalilov (8)
- Highest home attendance: 20,712 (1 April 2018 vs Persib)
- Lowest home attendance: 20,712 (1 April 2018 vs Persib)
- Average home league attendance: 20,712
- Biggest win: Sriwijaya 3–1 Persib (1 April 2018)
- Biggest defeat: Borneo 0-0 Sriwijaya (25 March 2018)
Home colours	Away colours	Third colours
- All statistics correct as of 3 April 2018.

The 2018 season was the Sriwijaya's 12th season in the club's football history. Along with Liga 1, the club competed in Piala Indonesia. In the pre-season, Sriwijaya attended two competitions, 2018 Indonesia President's Cup and 2018 East Kalimantan Governor's Cup with resulted in third place and champion respectively.

== Month by month review ==
=== November 2017 ===
The team has announced former T-Team coach, Rahmad Darmawan as their new head coach. He is also Sriwijaya's former coach from 2007 season to 2009 season. Several players from previous season left the club as their contract terms came to their end and the club didn't renew their contracts. Esteban Vizcarra, Makan Konaté, Adam Alis, Alfin Tuasalamony, and Yogi Rahardian joined the club not long after the appointment of the new coach.

=== December 2017 ===
The club started their training for 2018 season on 4 December 2017 without their head coach due to his pilgrimage to Mecca. As of 8 December 2017, 13 new players had been signed for Sriwijaya, including 2017 AFC Cup best player and former FC Istiklol player, Manuchekhr Dzhalilov. However, two Semen Padang players, Irsyad Maulana and Agung Prasetyo cancelled from signing to Sriwijaya due to them accepted their previous club's new contract. Alberto Gonçalves and Esteban Vizcarra applied for Indonesian citizenship and expected to be completed before the new season league. The club held two friendly matches with local clubs with good results.

=== January 2018 ===
Several new players signed for Sriwijaya in January 2018, including ex-Borneo FC, Patrich Wanggai. The club also held one more friendly match with local club before heading to Java to hold two more friendly matches in Cilegon and Bekasi. Then, the team went to Bandung to compete in 2018 Indonesia President's Cup Group A with Persib Bandung, PSMS Medan, and PSM Makassar, booked their place in quarterfinal as the group leader with two wins and one loss.

=== February 2018 ===
Sriwijaya went into President's cup quarterfinal against Arema FC in Manahan Stadium, Surakarta and won against them with 3–1 score. The team failed to proceed to the final after they lost against Bali United by 0-1 aggregate. Sriwijaya won the third place of the cup after they defeated PSMS Medan with 4–0 score.

The team went to Balikpapan to attend 2018 East Kalimantan Governor's Cup in Group B with Persiba Balikpapan, Madura United, and Persebaya Surabaya. After having a win streaks against Persiba and Madura United, the team played their second team and lose against Persebaya 0-2 and booked the second place in the group and faced Borneo FC in Samarinda.

=== March 2018 ===
On 2 March, Sriwijaya won against Borneo 5–4 in penalty shootout. In this match, Sriwijaya's wingback Marckho Meraudje was punched by two match officials on the corridor leading to the dressing room after being sent off by referee after a red card for his foul against Borneo player Abdur Rahman, sparking outrage from his club.

On 4 March, Sriwijaya won 2018 East Kalimantan Governor's Cup after defeating Arema 3–2. Four days later, the trophy was brought to a parade in Palembang as the team came back from Kalimantan.

On 25 March, Sriwijaya's first match was ended in an away draw against Borneo 0–0 in Samarinda. Under fears of the cup incident, the team played stagnantly in the first half of the match with little improvisation and predictable attack plans. The team situation improved in the second half with aggressive approaches and increased pace as the team spent less time in holding the ball and attacking more aggressively, but they can't score any goals.

=== April 2018 ===
On 1 April 2018, Sriwijaya earned their first home victory against Persib Bandung 3–1. The first half marked by a sluggish start by Sriwijaya as the home stunned by Ezechiel N’Douassel in a counterattack, making Persib leads 1–0 against Sriwijaya. Two minutes into the second half, a long shot by Ezteban Viscarra equalised the score, then Sriwijaya leads the game 2-1 as Marckho Meraudje launched a strike to the upper left corner of the goal. Dzhalilov earned his first goal in the league as he ran onto Vizcarra's slide-rule pass before lifting his shot over Wirawan.

== Coaching staff ==
Position	Name
Head coach	(Indonesia) Subangkit
Assistant coach	(Indonesia) Francis Wewengkang
Goalkeeping coach 1	(Indonesia) Heri Susilo
Goalkeeping coach 2	(Indonesia) Kurnia Sandy
Fitness coach	(Indonesia) Rasiman
Doctor	(Indonesia) El Amin

== Squad information ==
=== First-team squad ===
As of 11 August 2018

No.	Name	Nat.	Date of Birth (Age)	Since	Signed from	Apps	Goals
Goalkeepers
1	Dikri Yusron	(Indonesia)	January 8, 1995 (aged 22)	2017	(Indonesia) Persela Lamongan	3	0
12	Teja Paku Alam	(Indonesia)	September 14, 1994 (aged 23)	2013	Youth system	46	0
86	Sandy Firmansyah	(Indonesia)	July 7, 1983 (aged 34)	2017	(Indonesia) Gresik United	11	0
96	Rangga Pratama	(Indonesia)	April 18, 1996 (aged 21)	2017	(Indonesia) Barito Putera	1	0
Defenders
4	Alan Henrique	(Brazil)	June 19, 1991 (aged 26)	2018	(Finland) Inter Turku	0	0
5	Rizky Abdiansyah	(Indonesia)	January 27, 1996 (aged 21)	2018	(Indonesia) PSMS Medan	0	0
16	Goran Gančev	(North Macedonia)	August 4, 1983 (aged 34)	2018	(North Macedonia) Akademija Pandev	0	0
18	Achmad Faris	(Indonesia)	July 3, 1993 (aged 24)	2017	(Indonesia) Gresik United	14	0
20	Beri Rahmada	(Indonesia)	July 17, 1998 (aged 19)	2018	Youth system	0	0
22	Marckho Meraudje	(Indonesia)	December 4, 1994 (aged 23)	2017		45	4
27	Zalnando	(Indonesia)	December 25, 1995 (aged 22)	2016	Youth system	17	0
30	Jeki Arisandi	(Indonesia)	November 30, 1990 (aged 27)	2018	(Indonesia) Barito Putera	0	0
31	Samuel Christianson	(Indonesia)	July 31, 1999 (aged 18)	2018	(Indonesia) Persija Jakarta U-18	0	0
45	Bio Paulin	(Indonesia)	April 15, 1984 (aged 33)	2017	(Indonesia) Persipura Jayapura	11	0
99	Mohammadou Al Hadji	(Indonesia)	November 26, 1986 (aged 31)	2018	(Indonesia) Borneo	0	0
Midfielders
6	Yoo Hyun-goo	(South Korea)	January 25, 1983 (aged 34)	2016	(Indonesia) Semen Padang	73	0
7	Yogi Rahadian	(Indonesia)	October 27, 1995 (aged 22)	2018	(Indonesia) Mitra Kukar	0	0
11	Esteban Vizcarra	(Indonesia)	April 11, 1986 (aged 31)	2018	(Indonesia) Arema	0	0
17	Nur Iskandar	(Indonesia)	December 7, 1986 (aged 31)	2017	(Indonesia) Semen Padang	43	2
21	Muhammad Rafif Putra	(Indonesia)	February 25, 1999 (aged 18)	2018	Youth system	0	0
24	Ichsan Kurniawan	(Indonesia)	December 24, 1995 (aged 22)	2013	Youth system	37	4
25	Syahrian Abimanyu	(Indonesia)	April 25, 1999 (aged 18)	2017	(Spain) Levante	6	0
26	Roby Andika	(Indonesia)	January 26, 1999 (aged 18)	2018	Youth system	0	0
35	Zulfiandi	(Indonesia)	July 17, 1995 (aged 22)	2018	(Indonesia) Bhayangkara	0	0
54	Muhammad Iqbal	(Indonesia)	July 5, 1999 (aged 18)	2018	Youth system	0	0
Forwards
9	Beto Gonçalves	(Indonesia)	December 31, 1980 (aged 37)	2016	(Malaysia) Penang	79	53
19	Muhamad Ridwan	(Indonesia)	June 13, 2000 (aged 17)	2018	Youth system	0	0
37	Rizky Ramadhana	(Indonesia)	March 7, 1992 (aged 25)	2011	Youth system	34	2
63	Manuchekhr Dzhalilov	(Tajikistan)	September 27, 1990 (aged 27)	2018	(Tajikistan) Istiklol	0	0
89	Hambali Tolib	(Indonesia)	June 20, 2000 (aged 17)	2018	Youth system	0	0

== New contracts ==
=== Promotion from Sriwijaya U-19 ===
No.	Pos	Player	Transferred From	Fee	Date	Source
20	DF	(Indonesia) Beri Rahmada	(Indonesia) Sriwijaya U-19		3 January 2018	
89	MF	(Indonesia) Hambali Tolib	(Indonesia) Sriwijaya U-19		3 January 2018	
27	MF	(Indonesia) Muhammad Iqbal	(Indonesia) Sriwijaya U-19		3 January 2018	
19	MF	(Indonesia) Muhammad Ridwan	(Indonesia) Sriwijaya U-19		3 January 2018	

=== In ===
No.	Pos	Player	Transferred From	Fee	Date	Source
	DF	(Indonesia) Hamka Hamzah	(Indonesia) PSM Makassar		3 January 2018	
	DF	(North Macedonia) Goran Gancev	(North Macedonia) Academija Pandev		15 July 2018	
	DF	(Indonesia) Mouhammadou Al Hadji	(Indonesia) Borneo F.C.		15 July 2018	
	DF	(Brazil) Alan Henrique	(Finland) FC Inter Turku		20 July 2018	
	DF	(Senegal) Mouhamadou N'Diaye	Free Agent		3 January 2018	
	DF	(Indonesia) Novan Sasongko	(Indonesia) Semen Padang F.C.		3 January 2018	
	DF	(Indonesia) Saepulloh Maulana	(Indonesia) Mitra Kukar		3 January 2018	
	DF	(Indonesia) Alfin Tuasalamony	(Indonesia) Bhayangkara F.C.		3 January 2018	
	MF	(Indonesia) Zulfiandi	(Indonesia) Bhayangkara F.C.		3 January 2018	
	MF	(Indonesia) Adam Alis Setyano	(Indonesia) Arema F.C.		3 January 2018	
	MF	(Indonesia) Syahrian Abimanyu	(Indonesia) Persija Jakarta		3 January 2018	
	MF	(Mali) Makan Konate	Free Agent		3 January 2018	
	FW	(Indonesia) Esteban Vizcarra	(Indonesia) Arema F.C.		3 January 2018	
	FW	(Tajikistan) Manuchekhr Dzhalilov	(Tajikistan) Istiqlol Dushanbe		3 January 2018	
	FW	(Indonesia) Patrich Wanggai	(Indonesia) Borneo F.C.		3 January 2018	

=== Out ===
No.	Pos	Player	Transferred To	Fee	Date	Source
	GK	(Indonesia) Sandy Firmansyah	-		9 November 2018	
	DF	(Indonesia) Hamka Hamzah	(Indonesia) Arema F.C.		13 July 2018	
	DF	(Senegal) Mouhamadou N'Diaye	(Indonesia) Bali United		13 July 2018	
	DF	(Indonesia) Novan Sasongko	(Indonesia) Bali United		3 July 2018	
	DF	(Indonesia) Saepulloh Maulana	(Indonesia) Mitra Kukar		3 July 2018	
	DF	(Indonesia) Alfin Tuasalamony	(Indonesia) Arema F.C.		3 July 2018	
	MF	(Indonesia) Adam Alis Setyano	(Indonesia) Bhayangkara F.C.		3 July 2018	
	MF	(Mali) Makan Konate	(Indonesia) Arema F.C.		3 July 2018	
	FW	(Indonesia) Patrich Wanggai	(Indonesia) Persib Bandung		3 July 2018	

== Pre-season ==
Win Draw Loss

23 December 2017 1	Sriwijaya	10-0	PSAD Sumsel	Palembang, South Sumatra
15:00 (UTC+7)	Manuchekhr Dzhalilov 23' 35'; Rahmad Hidayat 67' 70'; Makan Konate 89'; Gilang Ginarsa 22'; Adam Alis 24'; Yogi Rahadian 30'; Muhammad Roby 47'; Ichsan Kurniawan 64'	Report		Stadium: Bumi Sriwijaya Stadium; Attendance: TBA; Referee: TBA

28 December 2017 2	Sriwijaya	8-0	Bina Citra Andalan	Palembang, South Sumatra
15:00 (UTC+7)		Report	Manuchekhr Dzhalilov; Manda Cingi; Makan Konate; Adam Alis }	Stadium: Bumi Sriwijaya Stadium

6 January 2018 3	Sriwijaya	16-0	Pemuda Lalan	Palembang, South Sumatra
15:00 (UTC+7)	Manuchekhr Dzhalilov 5' 13' 26' 38'; Alberto Goncalves 70' 73' 76'; Adam Alis 1' 10'; Ichsan Kurniawan 22'; Yoo Hyun-goo 42'; Makan Konate 58'; Yogi Rahadian 78'; Rizky Ramadhana 79'; TBD 84'(o.g.); Samuel Christianson 90'	Report		Stadium: Bumi Sriwijaya Stadium

11 January 2018 4	Cilegon United	1-4	Sriwijaya	Cilegon, Banten
15:00 (UTC+7)	Septian Andriansyah 38'	Report	Alberto Goncalves; Adam Alis; Rachmad Hidayat	Stadium: Krakatau Steel Stadium

13 January 2018 5	Bekasi Selection	0-7	Sriwijaya	Bekasi, West Java
15:00 (UTC+7)		Report	Alberto Goncalves; Adam Alis; Esteban Vizcarra; Patrich Wanggai; Nur Iskandar	Stadium: Patriot Chandrabhaga Stadium

== Competitions ==
=== Liga 1 ===
==== League table ====
Locations of the 2018 Liga 1 teams

Pos	Team	Pld	W	D	L	GF	GA	GD	Pts	Qualification or relegation
14	Perseru	34	11	9	14	34	41	−7	42 (Note: Head-to-head results: Perseru 0–0 PS TIRA; PS TIRA 0–1 Perseru)	
15	PS TIRA	34	12	6	16	48	57	−9	42	
16	Mitra Kukar (R)	34	12	3	19	45	58	−13	39 (Note: Head-to-head results: Mitra Kukar 3–0 Sriwijaya; Sriwijaya 3–1 Mitra Kukar)	Relegation to Liga 2
17	Sriwijaya (R)	34	11	6	17	48	56	−8	39	Relegation to Liga 2
18	PSMS (Note: PSMS were deducted three points due to FIFA sanction.) (R)	34	11	4	19	50	70	−20	34	Relegation to Liga 2

Source: Go-Jek Liga 1, Soccerway
Rules for classification: 1) Points; 2) Head-to-head; 3) Goal difference; 4) Goals scored; 5) Drawing.
(R) Relegated

==== Matches ====
Win Draw Loss

First round

25 March 2018 1	Borneo	0-0	Sriwijaya F.C.	Samarinda, East Kalimantan
16:00 (UTC+7)				Stadium: Segiri Stadium

1 April 2018 2	Sriwijaya F.C.	3-1	Persib	Palembang, South Sumatera
18:30 (UTC+7)	Vizcarra 47'; Marckho 49'; Dzhalilov 66'	Report	N'Douassel 28'	Stadium: Gelora Sriwijaya Stadium; Attendance: 20,712; Referee: Abdul Rahman Salasa

7 April 2018 3	Madura United	3-0	Sriwijaya F.C.	Pamekasan, East Java
15.30 (UTC+7)	Fabiano 83'; Zah Rahan 85'; Bayu Gatra 90+2'			Stadium: Gelora Ratu Pamelingan Stadium

14 April 2018 4	Sriwijaya F.C.	2-2	Persipura Jayapura	Palembang, South Sumatra
15.30 (UTC+7)	Dzhalilov 11'; Beto 37'		Sacramento 62' 68'	Stadium: Gelora Sriwijaya Stadium

22 April 2018 5	Persebaya Surabaya	1-1	Sriwijaya F.C.	Surabaya, East Java
15.30 (UTC+7)	David Da Silva 11'		Beto 45'	Stadium: Gelora Bung Tomo Stadium

28 April 2018 6	Sriwijaya F.C.	0-0	PSM Makassar	Palembang, South Sumatra
15.30 (UTC+7)				Stadium: Gelora Sriwijaya Stadium

28 April 2018 7	Bali United F.C.	3-4	Sriwijaya F.C.	Gianyar, Bali
15.30 (UTC+7)	Spasojević 13'; Alfin 41' (o.g); Stefano Lilipaly 58' (pen.)		Hamka Hamzah 28' 90+2'; Beto 43'; Dzhalilov 53'	Stadium: Kapten I Wayan Dipta Stadium

12 May 2018 8	Sriwijaya F.C.	2-1	Bhayangkara F.C.	Palembang, South Sumatra
15.30 (UTC+7)	Vizcarra 84'; Patrich Wanggai 86'		Paulo Sergio 88' (pen.)	Stadium: Gelora Sriwijaya Stadium

18 May 2018 9	PSMS Medan	1-0	Sriwijaya F.C.	Medan, North Sumatra
18.30 (UTC+7)	Sharofetdinov 84'			Stadium: Teladan Stadium

22 May 2018 10	Sriwijaya F.C.	4-0	PSIS Semarang	Palembang, South Sumatra
18.30 (UTC+7)	Hamka Hamzah 51'; Mahamadou N'Diaye 56' 60'; Beto 64'			Stadium: Gelora Sriwijaya Stadium

27 May 2018 11	Perseru Serui	1-0	Sriwijaya F.C.	Yapen Island, Papua
15.30 (UTC+7)	Mahamadou N'Diaye 80' (o.g)			Stadium: Marora Stadium

2 June 2018 12	Sriwijaya F.C.	5-1	Persela Lamongan	Palembang, South Sumatra
15.30 (UTC+7)	Mahamadou N'Diaye 27' 53'; Dzhalilov 31' (pen.); Vizcarra 43'; Patrich Wanggai 85'		Loris Arnaud 82'	Stadium: Gelora Sriwijaya Stadium

8 June 2018 13	Barito Putera	3-1	Sriwijaya F.C.	Banjarbaru, South Kalimantan
18.30 (UTC+7)	Samsul Arif 34'; Matias Córdoba 61'; Rizky Pora 71' (pen.)		Beto 90+1' (pen.)	Stadium: Demang Lehman Stadium

6 July 2018 14	Sriwijaya F.C.	4-1	PS TNI	Palembang, South Sumatera
15.30 (UTC+7)	Hamka Hamzah 20'; Vizcarra 27'; Beto 57'; Marckho Meraudje 90'		Aleksandar Rakić 39'	Stadium: Gelora Sriwijaya Stadium

10 July 2018 15	Sriwijaya F.C.	2-2	Persija Jakarta	Palembang, South Sumatera
18.30 (UTC+7)	Vizcarra 58' 68'		Ivan Carlos 45+4'; Rezaldi Hehanusa 64'	Stadium: Gelora Sriwijaya Stadium

18 July 2018 16	Mitra Kukar	3-0	Sriwijaya F.C.	Tenggarong, East Kalimantan
15.30 (UTC+7)	Fernando Rodríguez 36'; Saepulloh Maulana 47'; Septian David 81'			Stadium: Aji Imbut Stadium

21 July 2018 17	Sriwijaya F.C.	0-3	Arema F.C.	Palembang, South Sumatera
15.30 (UTC+7)			Ridwan Tawainella 51'; Rivaldi Bawuo 65'; Ahmad Nur Hadianto 77'	Stadium: Gelora Sriwijaya Stadium

Second round

29 July 2018 18	Sriwijaya F.C.	1-0	Borneo	Palembang, South Sumatera
16:00 (UTC+7)	Yogi Rahadian 84'			Stadium: Bumi Sriwijaya Stadium

4 August 2018 19	Persib	2-0	Sriwijaya F.C.	Soreang, West Java
15:00 (UTC+7)	Jonatan Bauman 16'; Patrich Wanggai 29'			Stadium: Jalak Harupat Stadium

11 August 2018 20	Sriwijaya F.C.	1-2	Madura United	Palembang, South Sumatra
15.30 (UTC+7)	Alan Henrique 90+4' (pen.)		Zah Rahan Krangar 56'; Mamadou Samassa 84'	Stadium: Bumi Sriwijaya Stadium

11 September 2018 21	Persipura Jayapura	1-0	Sriwijaya F.C.	Jayapura, Papua
15.30 (UTC+7)	Prisca Womsiwor 26'			Stadium: Mandala Stadium

16 September 2018 22	Sriwijaya F.C.	3-3	Persebaya Surabaya	Palembang, South Sumatra
18.30 (UTC+7)	Esteban Vizcarra 19'; Manuchekhr Dzhalilov 54'; Beto 61'		David Da Silva 3' 51'; O.K. John 20'	Stadium: Gelora Sriwijaya Stadium

23 September 2018 23	PSM Makassar	2-0	Sriwijaya F.C.	Makassar, South Sulawesi
18.30 (UTC+7)	Saldi 21'; Wilijan Pluim 89'			Stadium: Mattoangin Stadium

6 October 2018 24	Sriwijaya F.C.	3-2	Bali United F.C.	Palembang, South Sumatra
18.30 (UTC+7)	Novan Setya 2' (o.g); Esteban Vizcarra 61'; Beto 72'		Spasojević 73'; Melvin Platje 83'	Stadium: Gelora Sriwijaya Stadium

12 October 2018 25	Bhayangkara F.C.	2-0	Sriwijaya F.C.	Jakarta, DKI Jakarta
15.30 (UTC+7)	Paulo Sergio 60'; Elio Martins 86'			Stadium: PTIK Stadium

18 October 2018 26	Sriwijaya F.C.	0-3	PSMS Medan	Palembang, South Sumatra
18.30 (UTC+7)			Alexandros Tanidis 40'; Felipe Martins 77'; Shohei Matsunaga 90+5'	Stadium: Gelora Sriwijaya Stadium

23 October 2018 27	PSIS Semarang	1-0	Sriwijaya F.C.	Magelang, Central Java
15.30 (UTC+7)	Bruno Silva 90+4'			Stadium: Moch. Soebroto Stadium

27 May 2018 28	Sriwijaya F.C.	4-0	Perseru Serui	Palembang, South Sumatra
15.30 (UTC+7)	Beto 4' (pen.) 75'; Muhammad Nur Iskandar 60'; Muhammad Ridwan Najib 84'			Stadium: Gelora Sriwijaya Stadium

2 June 2018 29	Persela Lamongan	3-0	Sriwijaya F.C.	Lamongan, East Java
15.30 (UTC+7)	Dendy Sulistyawan 30' 77'; Guntur Triaji 36'			Stadium: Surajaya Stadium

12 November 2018 30	Sriwijaya F.C.	2-0	Barito Putera	Palembang, South Sumatera
15.30 (UTC+7)	Rizky Ramadhana 53'; Esteban Vizcarra 90+5'			Stadium: Gelora Sriwijaya Stadium

17 November 2018 31	PS TNI	3-0	Sriwijaya F.C.	Bantul, D.I. Yogyakarta
15.30 (UTC+7)	Ahmad Noviandani 7'; Aleksandar Rakić 51'; Dimas Drajad 80'			Stadium: Sultan Agung Stadium

24 November 2018 32	Persija Jakarta	3-2	Sriwijaya F.C.	Bekasi, West Java
18.30 (UTC+7)	Marko Šimić 2'; Ramdani Lestaluhu 31'; Maman Abdurrahman 90+1'		Manuchekhr Dzhalilov 20'; Alan Henrique 63' (pen.)	Stadium: Patriot Candrabhaga Stadium

30 November 2018 33	Sriwijaya F.C.	3-1	Mitra Kukar	Palembang, South Sumatera
15.30 (UTC+7)	Esteban Vizcarra 21'; Beto 48'; Manuchekhr Dzhalilov 78'		Mauricio Leal 44'	Stadium: Gelora Sriwijaya Stadium

9 December 2018 34	Arema F.C.	2-1	Sriwijaya F.C.	Malang Regency, East Java
15.30 (UTC+7)	Makan Konate 63' (pen.); Dedik Setiawan 83'		Esteban Vizcarra 25'	Stadium: Kanjuruhan Stadium

=== Piala Indonesia ===
==== Matches ====
Win Draw Loss

First round

25 July 2018 Zone 3	PS Bangka Selection (3)	0-4	Sriwijaya F.C. (1)	Sungailiat, Bangka Belitung Islands
15:00		Report	Dzhalilov 25', 37' (pen.); Faris 35'; Christianson 80'	Stadium: Orom Stadium

Second round

14 December 2018 Zone 2	Persimura (3)	0-3	Sriwijaya F.C. (1)	Palembang, South Sumatra
15:00			Rizky 47'; Henrique 73', 85' (pen.)	Stadium: Gelora Sriwijaya Stadium

Third round

In 2019 season

== Squad statistics ==
=== Squad & Appearances ===
No.	Pos.	Name	Liga 1		Piala Indonesia		Discipline	
No.	Pos.	Name	Apps	Goals	Apps	Goals	Yellow card	Red card
Goalkeepers
12	GK	(Indonesia) Teja Paku Alam	32	0	0	0	0	0
86	GK	(Indonesia) Sandy Firmansyah	2	0	0	0	0	0
51	GK	(Indonesia) Dikri Yusron Afaffa	1	0	1	0	0	0
96	GK	(Indonesia) Rangga Pratama	0	0	1	0	0	0
Defenders
3	DF	(Indonesia) Zalnando	18	0	1	0	2	1
4	DF	(Brazil) Alan Henrique	16	2	1	2	5	0
16	DF	(North Macedonia) Goran Gančev	8	0	0	0	1	0
20	DF	(Indonesia) Beri Rahmada	3	0	2	0	0	0
22	DF	(Indonesia) Marckho Sandy Merauje	30	2	0	0	6	0
28	DF	(Indonesia) Achmad Faris	15	0	2	1	1	0
30	DF	(Indonesia) Jeki Arisandi	6	0	1	0	1	0
31	DF	(Indonesia) Samuel Christianson	2	0	2	1	0	0
99	DF	(Indonesia) Mohammadou Al Hadji	7	0	1	0	3	0
45	DF	(Indonesia) Bio Paulin	5	0	1	0	0	0
Midfielders
6	MF	(South Korea) Yoo Hyun-goo	31	0	2	0	2	0
11	MF	(Indonesia) Esteban Vizcarra	32	11	1	0	6	0
26	MF	(Indonesia) Robi Andika	5	0	1	0	0	0
75	MF	(Indonesia) Ichsan Kurniawan	3	0	0	0	0	0
21	MF	(Indonesia) Muhammad Rafif Putra	2	0	0	0	0	0
25	MF	(Indonesia) Syahrian Abimanyu	8	0	1	0	1	0
35	MF	(Indonesia) Zulfiandi	20	0	1	0	1	0
89	MF	(Indonesia) Hambali Tolib	6	0	1	0	0	0
55	MF	(Indonesia) Rizky Abdiansyah	3	0	0	0	1	0
Forwards
7	FW	(Indonesia) Yogi Rahadian	18	1	1	0	0	0
19	FW	(Indonesia) Muhammad Ridwan	3	1	0	0	0	0
9	FW	(Indonesia) Alberto Gonçalves Da Costa	25	11	0	0	1	0
10	FW	(Indonesia) Rizky Ramadhana	11	1	2	1	1	0
7	FW	(Indonesia) Muhammad Nur Iskandar	21	1	1	0	2	0
63	FW	(Tajikistan) Manuchekhr Dzhalilov	30	7	1	2	3	0
Players who have made an appearance or had a squad number this season but have left the club
	DF	(Indonesia) Hamka Hamzah	15	4	0	0	1	0
	DF	(Senegal) Mahamadou N'Diaye	12	4	0	0	5	1
	DF	(Indonesia) Novan Sasongko	8	0	0	0	2	0
	DF	(Indonesia) Alfin Tuasalamony	12	0	0	0	1	0
	MF	(Indonesia) Adam Alis Setyano	15	0	0	0	1	0
	MF	(Mali) Makan Konaté	15	0	0	0	3	0
	FW	(Indonesia) Patrich Wanggai	10	2	0	0	1	0

Last updated: 10 December 2018.

=== Goalscorers ===
As of 11 August 2018

Rank	Position	Name	Liga 1	Piala Indonesia	Piala Presiden	Total
1	FW	(Indonesia) Beto	11	0	1	12
1	MF	(Indonesia) Esteban Vizcarra	11	0	1	12
3	FW	(Tajikistan) Manuchekhr Dzhalilov	7	2	2	11
4	DF	(Indonesia) Hamka Hamzah	4	0	1	5
4	DF	(Mali) Mahamadou N'Diaye	4	0	1	5
6	DF	(Brazil) Alan Henrique	1	2	0	3
7	MF	(Mali) Makan Konaté	0	0	2	2
7	DF	(Indonesia) Marckho Meraudje	2	0	0	2
7	FW	(Indonesia) Rizky Ramadhana	1	1	0	2
7	FW	(Indonesia) Patrich Wanggai	2	0	0	2
8	DF	(Indonesia) Achmad Faris	0	1	0	1
8	FW	(Indonesia) Muhammad Nur Iskandar	1	0	0	1
8	FW	(Indonesia) Muhammad Ridwan	1	0	0	1
8	MF	(Indonesia) Adam Alis	0	0	1	1
8	MF	(Indonesia) Bio Paulin	0	0	1	1
8	MF	(Indonesia) Syahrian Abimanyu	0	0	1	1
8	DF	(Indonesia) Samuel Christianson	0	1	0	1
8	FW	(Indonesia) Yogi Rahadian	1	0	0	1
Own goals			1	0	1	1
Total			47	7	12	44
