= 2017 Sriwijaya F.C. season =

Sriwijaya
2017 season
- Chairman: Robert Heri
- Head Coach: Osvaldo Lessa
- Stadium: Jakabaring
- Liga 1: 11th
- Top goalscorer: League: Beto Goncalves (22 goals); All: Beto Goncalves (22 goals)

The 2017 Sriwijaya season was the 11th season in the club's football history, the 11th consecutive season in the top-flight Liga Indonesia season and the 7th season competing in the Liga 1.

== Matches ==
=== Legend ===
Win Draw Loss Postponed

== Statistics ==
=== Squad & Appearances ===
No.	Pos.	Name	Liga 1		Total		Discipline	
No.	Pos.	Name	Apps	Goals	Apps	Goals	Yellow card	Red card
Goalkeepers
12	GK	(Indonesia) Teja Paku Alam	25 (1)	0	25 (1)	0	2	0
86	GK	(Indonesia) Sandy Firmansyah	8 (1)	0	8 (1)	0	0	0
51	GK	(Indonesia) Dikri Yusron Afaffa	1 (1)	0	1 (1)	0	0	0
?	GK	(Indonesia) Rangga Pratama	1	0	1	0	0	0
Defenders
13	DF	(Indonesia) Yanto Basna	24	1	24	1	5	1
2	DF	(Indonesia) Indra Permana	9 (2)	0	9 (2)	0	2	0
3	DF	(Indonesia) Bobby Satria	17	0	17	0	2	0
11	DF	(Indonesia) Zalnando	11	0	11	0	3	0
16	DF	(Indonesia) Muhammad Roby	9	0	9	0	1	0
18	DF	(Indonesia) Achmad Faris	8 (2)	0	8 (2)	0	1	0
22	DF	(Indonesia) Marckho Sandy Merauje	27	2	27	2	8	0
23	DF	(Indonesia) Gilang Ginarsa	13 (3)	0	13 (3)	0	0	0
31	DF	(Indonesia) Dominggus Fakdawer	5 (3)	0	5 (3)	0	2	1
45	DF	(Indonesia) Bio Paulin	6	0	6	0	0	0
Midfielders
6	MF	(South Korea) Yoo Hyun-goo	32	0	32	0	6	1
8	MF	(Indonesia) Rachmat Hidayat	3 (7)	0	3 (7)	0	3	0
19	MF	(Indonesia) Manda Cingi	12 (6)	0	12 (6)	0	2	1
24	MF	(Indonesia) Ichsan Kurniawan	16 (8)	0	16 (8)	0	1	0
75	MF	(Tunisia) Tijani Belaid	25 (1)	5	25 (1)	5	4	0
77	MF	(Indonesia) Hafit Ibrahim	2 (4)	0	2 (4)	0	2	0
Forwards
7	FW	(Indonesia) Airlangga Sucipto	2 (11)	3	2 (11)	3	0	0
9	FW	(Brazil) Alberto Gonçalves Da Costa	33	22	33	22	3	0
10	FW	(Brazil) Hilton Moreira	32	10	32	10	6	0
17	FW	(Indonesia) Muhammad Nur Iskandar	21 (12)	2	21 (12)	2	0	0
37	FW	(Indonesia) Rizsky Dwi Ramadhana	2 (10)	1	2 (10)	1	1	0
87	FW	(Indonesia) Slamet Budiyono	6 (3)	3	6 (3)	3	0	0

Last updated: 14 November 2017.

== Transfers ==
=== In ===
No.	Pos.	Name	Moving from	Ref
	GK	(Indonesia) Sandy Firmansyah	Gresik United	
	DF	(Indonesia) Bobby Satria	Bali United	
	DF	(Indonesia) Rudolof Basna	Arema FC	
	DF	(Indonesia) Muhammad Roby	Mitra Kukar F.C.	
	DF	(Indonesia) Ahmad Faris	Gresik United	
	DF	(Indonesia) Marckho Sandy Merauje	PON Papua	
	DF	(Indonesia) Gilang Ginarsa	Madura United F.C.	
	DF	(Indonesia) Dominggus Fakdawer	Persipura Jayapura	
	DF	(Indonesia) Bio Paulin	Persipura Jayapura	
	MF	(Indonesia) Rahmat Hidayat	Persib Bandung	
	MF	(Tunisia) Tijani Belaid	(Tunisia) Veria F.C.	
	FW	(Indonesia) Muhammad Nur Iskandar	Semen Padang F. C.	

=== Out ===
No.	Pos.	Name	Moving to	Ref
	GK	(Indonesia) Tri Goentoro	PSS Sleman	
	DF	(Indonesia) Ngurah Nanak	Bali United	
	DF	(Indonesia) Wildansyah	Persib Bandung	
	DF	(Indonesia) Supardi Nasir	Persib Bandung	
	DF	(Indonesia) Achmad Jufriyanto	Persib Bandung	
	DF	(Indonesia) Fachrudin Aryanto	Madura United F.C.	
	DF	(Cameroon) Thierry Gathuessi	Barito Putra	
	DF	(Brazil) Mauricio Leal	Persipura Jayapura	
	MF	(Indonesia) Firman Utina	Bhayangkara F.C.	
	MF	(Indonesia) Eka Ramdani	Persela Lamongan	
	MF	(Indonesia) Muhammad Ridwan	PSIS Semarang	
	FW	(Indonesia) T.A. Musafri	Barito Putra	
