= 2015 Sriwijaya F.C. season =

Sriwijaya
2015 season
- Chairman: Robert Heri
- Head Coach: Benny Dollo
- Stadium: Jakabaring
- Indonesian Super League: TBD

The 2015 Sriwijaya season is the 10th season in the club's football history, the 10th consecutive season in the top-flight Liga Indonesia season and the 7th season competing in the Indonesia Super League.

== Review and events ==
=== Pre–2015 ===
On 1 December, Sriwijaya announced that Benny Dollo had been appointed as the new manager for the 2015 season.

== Matches ==
=== Legend ===
Win Draw Loss Postponed

== Statistics ==
=== Squad ===
As of 7 April 2015.

No.	Pos	Nat	Player	Total		Indonesia Super League		Piala Indonesia	
No.	Pos	Nat	Player	Apps	Goals	Apps	Goals	Apps	Goals
1	GK	(Indonesia) IDN	Yogi Triana	0	0	0	0	0	0
3	DF	(Indonesia) IDN	Jajang Maulana	0	0	0	0	0	0
5	DF	(Mali) MLI	Abdoulaye Maïga	2	0	2	0	0	0
6	MF	(Indonesia) IDN	Asri Akbar	2	0	2	0	0	0
8	MF	(Indonesia) IDN	Raphael Maitimo	2	0	2	0	0	0
9	FW	(Croatia) CRO	Goran Ljubojević	2	0	2	0	0	0
10	MF	(Mali) MLI	Morimakan Koïta	2	0	2	0	0	0
11	FW	(Indonesia) IDN	Alan Martha	0	0	0	0	0	0
12	MF	(Indonesia) IDN	Manda Cingi	0	0	0	0	0	0
14	DF	(Indonesia) IDN	Fathul Rahman	2	0	2	0	0	0
15	MF	(Indonesia) IDN	Hafit Ibrahim	0	0	0	0	0	0
17	FW	(Indonesia) IDN	Ferdinand Sinaga	2	0	2	0	0	0
18	FW	(Indonesia) IDN	Rishadi Fauzi	0	0	0	0	0	0
22	DF	(Indonesia) IDN	Wildansyah	2	0	2	0	0	0
23	GK	(Indonesia) IDN	Teja Paku Alam	0	0	0	0	0	0
24	MF	(Indonesia) IDN	Ichsan Kurniawan	1	0	1	0	0	0
25	FW	(Indonesia) IDN	Titus Bonai	2	0	2	0	0	0
26	DF	(Indonesia) IDN	Fachrudin Aryanto	2	0	2	0	0	0
28	DF	(Indonesia) IDN	Ngurah Nanak	0	0	0	0	0	0
30	DF	(Indonesia) IDN	Jeki Arisandi	1	0	1	0	0	0
33	GK	(Indonesia) IDN	Dian Agus Prasetyo	2	0	2	0	0	0
37	FW	(Indonesia) IDN	Rizky Ramadhana	0	0	0	0	0	0
88	FW	(Indonesia) IDN	Patrich Wanggai	2	0	2	0	0	0
91	FW	(Indonesia) IDN	Anis Nabar	2	0	2	0	0	0
92	FW	(Indonesia) IDN	Syakir Sulaiman	0	0	0	0	0	0

== Transfers ==
=== In ===
No.	Pos.	Name	Moving from	Type	Sources
	GK	(Indonesia) Dian Agus Prasetyo	Mitra Kukar	Free	
	DF	(Indonesia) Zulkifli Syukur	Mitra Kukar	Free	
	DF	(Indonesia) Ngurah Nanak	Persija Jakarta	Free	
	DF	(Indonesia) Wildansyah	Pelita Bandung Raya	Free	
	MF	(Indonesia) Ichsan Kurniawan	Sriwijaya U-21	Promotion to main team	
	MF	(Mali) Morimakan Koïta	(Mali) Stade Malien	Free	
	FW	(Uruguay) Christian Vaquero	(Uruguay) Huracán	Free	
	FW	(Indonesia) Ferdinand Sinaga	Persib Bandung	Free	
	FW	(Indonesia) Patrich Wanggai	(Malaysia) T–Team	Free	
	FW	(Indonesia) Titus Bonai	Persipura Jayapura	Free	
	GK	(Indonesia) Yogi Triana	Persita Tangerang	Free	
	DF	(Indonesia) Fachrudin Aryanto	Persepam Madura United	Free	
