= 2015 Semen Padang F.C. season =

Semen Padang
2015 season
- Chairman: Erizal Anwar
- Head Coach: Nil Maizar
- Stadium: Haji Agus Salim
- Indonesian Super League: TBD

The 2015 Semen Padang season is the third season competing in the Indonesia Super League.

== Review and events ==
=== Pre–2015 ===
Their first training for the 2015 Indonesia Super League on December 1, 2014.

== Matches ==
=== Legend ===
Win Draw Loss Postponed

== Statistics ==
=== Squad ===
As of 1 December 2014

No.	Pos	Nat	Player	Total		Indonesia Super League	
No.	Pos	Nat	Player	Apps	Goals	Apps	Goals
1	GK	(Indonesia) IDN	Rachmanuddin	0	0	0	0
2	DF	(Indonesia) IDN	Novan Sasongko	0	0	0	0
6	MF	(South Korea) KOR	Yoo Hyun-goo	0	0	0	0
7	DF	(Indonesia) IDN	Rudi	0	0	0	0
8	MF	(Indonesia) IDN	Eka Ramdani	0	0	0	0
11	DF	(Indonesia) IDN	Hengky Ardiles (c)	0	0	0	0
14	GK	(Indonesia) IDN	Putra Syabilul Rasad	0	0	0	0
15	MF	(Indonesia) IDN	Hendra Bayauw	0	0	0	0
16	DF	(Indonesia) IDN	Saepulloh Maulana	0	0	0	0
17	FW	(Indonesia) IDN	Nur Iskandar	0	0	0	0
18	MF	(Indonesia) IDN	Ricky Ohorella	0	0	0	0
22	GK	(Indonesia) IDN	Jandia Eka Putra	0	0	0	0
23	MF	(Argentina) ARG	Esteban Vizcarra	0	0	0	0
26	DF	(Indonesia) IDN	Seftia Hadi	0	0	0	0
28	MF	(Indonesia) IDN	Safrial Irfandi	0	0	0	0
31	GK	(Indonesia) IDN	Fakrurrazi	0	0	0	0
41	FW	(Indonesia) IDN	Agnef Syafantri	0	0	0	0
45	FW	(Indonesia) IDN	Gitra Yudha Furthon	0	0	0	0
99	FW	(Indonesia) IDN	Airlangga Sucipto	0	0	0	0
	FW	(Mali) MLI	Djibril Coulibaly	0	0	0	0
	DF	(Indonesia) IDN	Zulchrizal Abdul Gamal	0	0	0	0
	MF	(Indonesia) IDN	Vendry Mofu	0	0	0	0

== Transfers ==
=== In ===
No.	Pos.	Name	Moving from	Type	Sources
	FW	(Mali) Djibril Coulibaly	Persib Bandung	Free	
	DF	(Indonesia) Zulchrizal Abdul Gamal	Persib Bandung	Free	
	MF	(Indonesia) Vendry Mofu	Sriwijaya	Free	

=== Out ===
No.	Pos.	Name	Moving to	Type	Sources
	FW	(Nigeria) Osas Saha		Released	
	DF	(Cameroon) David Pagbe		Released	
	FW	(Indonesia) Fahriza Dillah		Released	
	MF	(Indonesia) Jajang Paliama		Released	
	MF	(Indonesia) Muhammad Rizal		Released	
	DF	(Indonesia) Valentino Telaubun		Released	
