= Koïta (surname) =

Koïta or Koita is a surname. Notable people with the surname include:

- Amadou Koïta, Malian politician
- Assa Koïta (born 1991), French rugby union player
- Bengali-Fodé Koita (born 1990), French football player
- Morimakan Koïta (born 1990), Malian football player
- Moussa Koita (born 1982), French football player
- Sékou Koïta (born 1999), Malian football player
