= 2020 East Java Governor Cup =

Tournament details
- Country: Indonesia
- Dates: 10–20 February 2020
- Teams: 8

Final positions
- Champions: Persebaya (2nd title)
- Runners-up: Persija
- Semifinalists: Arema; Madura United

Tournament statistics
- Matches played: 15
- Goals scored: 50 (3.33 per match)
- Top goal scorer: (Croatia) Marko Šimić (6 goals)

Awards
- Best player: (Mali) Makan Konaté
- All statistics correct as of 20 February 2020.

2020 East Java Governor Cup (Indonesian: Piala Gubernur Jatim 2020) was the thirteenth edition of East Java Governor Cup football championship, which was held by the Football Association of Indonesia (PSSI) as pre-season tournament during 2020 Liga 1 season break. The tournament was started on 10 February 2020 and ended on 20 February 2020. The broadcasting rights were granted solely to MNCTV.

== Teams ==
There are 8 clubs participating in the 2020 East Java Governor Cup. The clubs were divided into two groups, each filled with four participants. The tournament was attended by five club from East Java Province and three invited teams. One of the invited teams came from Malaysia.

Club	Location	2019 season
Arema	Malang	9th in Liga 1
Bhayangkara	Jakarta	4th in Liga 1
Madura United	Pamekasan	5th in Liga 1
Persebaya	Surabaya	2nd in Liga 1
Persela	Lamongan	11th in Liga 1
Persija	Jakarta	10th in Liga 1
Persik	Kediri	Liga 2 Champions
Sabah	Sabah	Malaysia Premier League Champions

== Venues ==
Bangkalan	Malang	Blitar	Sidoarjo
Gelora Bangkalan Stadium	Kanjuruhan Stadium	Gelora Supriyadi Stadium	Gelora Delta Stadium
Capacity: 15,000	Capacity: 42,449	Capacity: 15,000	Capacity: 35,000
Gelora Bangkalan Stadium	Kanjuruhan Stadium		Gelora Delta Stadium

== Group stage ==
=== Group A ===
- All matches played in Bangkalan, East Java
- Times listed are local (UTC+7:00)

Pos	Team	Pld	W	D	L	GF	GA	GD	Pts	Qualification
1	Persebaya	3	2	0	1	7	4	+3	6	Knockout stage
2	Madura United (H)	3	1	1	1	4	5	−1	4	Knockout stage
3	Bhayangkara	3	1	1	1	2	4	−2	4	
4	Persik	3	1	0	2	4	4	0	3	

Updated to match(es) played on 14 February 2020. Source:
(H) Hosts
10 February 2020
15:00

Persebaya	3–1	Persik
Supriadi 19'; Hambali 42'; Alwi 45+1' (pen.)	Report	Bakmaz 50'

Gelora Bangkalan Stadium, Bangkalan
Referee: Rully Ruslin
10 February 2020
18:30

Madura United	1–1	Bhayangkara
Tuharea 35'	Report	Jufriyanto 32'

Gelora Bangkalan Stadium, Bangkalan
Referee: Fariq Hitaba

12 February 2020
15:00

Bhayangkara	1–0	Persebaya
Dendy 70'	Report

Gelora Bangkalan Stadium, Bangkalan
Referee: Yudi Nurcahya
12 February 2020
18:30

Persik	0–1	Madura United
	Report	Kevy 55'

Gelora Bangkalan Stadium, Bangkalan
Referee: Hamim Tohari

14 February 2020
15:00

Madura United	2–4	Persebaya
Gonçalves 60'; Tuharea 66'	Report	Konaté 21', 45'; da Silva 64'; Satria 80'

Gelora Bangkalan Stadium, Bangkalan
Referee: Fariq Hitaba
14 February 2020
18:30

Persik	3–0	Bhayangkara
Faris 15'; Bakmaz 39'; Sitanggang 68'	Report

Gelora Bangkalan Stadium, Bangkalan
Referee: Yeni Krisdianto

=== Group B ===
- All matches played in Malang, East Java
- Times listed are local (UTC+7:00)

Pos	Team	Pld	W	D	L	GF	GA	GD	Pts	Qualification
1	Persija	3	2	1	0	7	2	+5	7	Knockout stage
2	Arema (H)	3	2	1	0	6	2	+4	7	Knockout stage
3	Sabah	3	0	1	2	2	6	−4	1	
4	Persela	3	0	1	2	4	9	−5	1	

Updated to match(es) played on 15 February 2020. Source:
(H) Hosts
11 February 2020
15:00

Persija	4–1	Persela
Šimić 16', 60' (pen.), 90'; Novri 29'	Report	Rafinha 36'

Kanjuruhan Stadium, Malang
Referee: Oki Dwi Putra
11 February 2020
18:30

Arema	2–0	Sabah
In-kyun 3'; Randy 33' (o.g.)	Report

Kanjuruhan Stadium, Malang
Referee: Aprisman Aranda

13 February 2020
15:00

Sabah	0–2	Persija
	Report	Šimić 36'; Rohit 52'

Kanjuruhan Stadium, Malang
Referee: Iwan Sukoco
13 February 2020
18:30

Arema	3–1	Persela
Kushedya 23'; Bauman 52'; Alderete 76'	Report	Rafinha 46'

Kanjuruhan Stadium, Malang
Referee: Tabrani

15 February 2020
15:00

Persela	2–2	Sabah
Wiradinata 4'; Risaldi 87'	Report	Alto 3'; Héctor 72'

Kanjuruhan Stadium, Malang
Referee: Aprisman Aranda
15 February 2020
18:30

Arema	1–1	Persija
Alfarizi 81'	Report	Riko 22'

Kanjuruhan Stadium, Malang
Referee: Dwi Purba

== Knockout stage ==
Bracket

Semi-finals
18 February - Blitar
Persebaya	4
Arema	2
17 February - Malang
Persija	2
Madura United	1

Final
20 February - Sidoarjo
Persebaya	4
Persija	1

=== Semi-finals ===
18 February 2020
15:00

Persebaya	4–2	Arema
da Silva 27', 70'; Mahmoud 45+2'; Irfan 53'	Report	Alfarizi 3'; Alderete 74'

Gelora Supriyadi Stadium, Blitar
Referee: Fariq Hitaba
17 February 2020
19:00

Persija	2–1	Madura United
Šimić 3'; Novri 56'	Report	Greg 71'

Kanjuruhan Stadium, Malang
Referee: Oki Dwi Putra

=== Final ===
20 February 2020
15:30

Persebaya	4–1	Persija
Oktafianus 3'; Konaté 52'; Kambuaya 55'; Mahmoud 80'	Report	Šimić 43'

Gelora Delta Stadium, Sidoarjo
Referee: Dwi Purba

== Awards ==
Award	Player	Team
Best Player	(Mali) Makan Konaté	(Indonesia) Persebaya
Top Goalscorer	(Croatia) Marko Šimić	(Indonesia) Persija

== Goalscorers ==
There were 50 goals scored in 15 matches, for an average of 3.33 goals per match.

6 goals

- (Croatia) Marko Šimić

3 goals

- (Brazil) David da Silva
- (Mali) Makan Konaté

2 goals

- (Argentina) Elías Alderete
- (Australia) Ante Bakmaz
- (Brazil) Rafinha
- (Indonesia) Haris Tuharea
- (Indonesia) Johan Alfarizi
- (Indonesia) Novri Setiawan
- (Palestine) Mahmoud Eid

1 goal

- (Argentina) Jonatan Bauman
- (Indonesia) Achmad Jufriyanto
- (Indonesia) Alto Linus
- (Indonesia) Alwi Slamat
- (Indonesia) Arif Satria
- (Indonesia) Beto Gonçalves
- (Indonesia) Dendy Sulistyawan
- (Indonesia) Faris Aditama
- (Indonesia) Greg Nwokolo
- (Indonesia) Hambali Tolib
- (Indonesia) Irfan Jaya
- (Indonesia) Kevy Syahertian
- (Indonesia) Kushedya Hari Yudo
- (Indonesia) Malik Risaldi
- (Indonesia) Mochammad Supriadi
- (Indonesia) Oktafianus Fernando
- (Indonesia) Paulo Sitanggang
- (Indonesia) Ricky Kambuaya
- (Indonesia) Riko Simanjuntak
- (Indonesia) Ryan Wiradinata
- (South Korea) Oh In-kyun
- (Malaysia) Alto Linus
- (Nepal) Rohit Chand
- (Puerto Rico) Hector Ramos

1 own goal

- (Malaysia) Randy Baruh (against Arema)
