= Samuel Simanjuntak =

Indonesian footballer

Personal information
- Full name: Samuel Christianson Simanjuntak
- Date of birth: 31 July 1999 (age 27)
- Place of birth: Depok, Indonesia
- Height: 1.72 m (5 ft 8 in)
- Position: Left-back

Team information
- Current team: PSMS Medan
- Number: 12

Youth career
- Jakarta Football Academy
- 2012: Southampton
- 2016: Royal European FA
- 2017: Persija Jakarta

Senior career*
Years	Team	Apps	(Gls)
2018	Sriwijaya	2	(0)
2019	PSS Sleman	5	(0)
2020–2021	Madura United	6	(0)
2021–2022	→ Persija Jakarta (loan)	3	(0)
2022–2023	PSM Makassar	1	(0)
2023–2024	Persis Solo	3	(0)
2023–2024	→ PSIM Yogyakarta (loan)	7	(0)
2024–2025	PSIM Yogyakarta	12	(0)
2025–2026	Semen Padang	21	(1)
2026–	PSMS Medan	1	(0)

International career
2013	Indonesia U16	6	(0)
2017–2018	Indonesia U19	10	(1)
2019	Indonesia U23	2	(0)
Medal record
Men's football
Representing Indonesia
AFF U-16 Youth Championship
Runner-up	2013 Myanmar
AFF U-19 Youth Championship
Third place	2017 Myanmar
Third place	2018 Indonesia	Team
AFF U-22 Youth Championship
Winner	2019 Cambodia	Team
- * Club domestic league appearances and goals as of 13 September 2026

Samuel Christianson Simanjuntak (born 31 July 1999) is an Indonesian professional footballer who plays as a left-back for Championship club PSMS Medan.

== Early career ==
Samuel started his football career from the Jakarta Football Academy Football School (JFAS). When he was 12 years old, Samuel was selected as the player who was given the opportunity to undergoing joint training with one of EPL clubs, Southampton in 2012. Samuel joined the Royal European Football Academy (REFA), Valencia, at 16 years old and he call up Indonesia national under-19 football team at 2017.

== Club career ==
=== Sriwijaya ===
On 4 December 2017, Christianson signed a one-year contract with Indonesian Liga 1 club Sriwijaya on a free transfer. Christianson made his Sriwijaya debut in a 3–0 loss against Mitra Kukar on 18 July 2018 as a substitute for Yogi Rahadian in the 69th minute.

=== PSS Sleman ===
On 28 August 2019, Christianson moved to Sleman and signed a one-year contract with Indonesian Liga 1 club PSS Sleman on a free transfer. Christianson made his league debut in a 4–0 loss against Arema on 24 September 2019.

=== Madura United ===
On 4 January 2020, Christianson moved to Pamekasan and signed a one-year contract with Indonesian Liga 1 club Madura United on a free transfer. He signed for Madura United alongside Brian Ferreira and Haris Tuharea. This season was suspended on 27 March 2020 due to the COVID-19 pandemic. The season was abandoned and was declared void on 20 January 2021. And finally Christianson made his league debut on 3 September 2021 in a match against Persikabo 1973.

==== Persija Jakarta (loan) ====
In January 2022, Christianson signed a contract with Liga 1 club Persija Jakarta on loan from Madura United. He made his league debut in a 2–1 loss against Persipura Jayapura on 11 January 2022 as a substitute for Novri Setiawan in the 82nd minute at the Kapten I Wayan Dipta Stadium, Gianyar.

=== PSM Makassar ===
Samuel was signed for PSM Makassar to play in Liga 1 in the 2022–23 season. He made his league debut on 10 September 2022 in a match against Persebaya Surabaya at the Gelora B.J. Habibie Stadium, Parepare.

== Career statistics ==
=== Club ===
As of match played 13 September 2026

Club	Season	League			Cup		Continental		Other		Total	
Club	Season	Division	Apps	Goals	Apps	Goals	Apps	Goals	Apps	Goals	Apps	Goals
Sriwijaya	2018	Liga 1	2	0	0	0	—		0	0	2	0
PSS Sleman	2019	Liga 1	5	0	0	0	—		0	0	5	0
Madura United	2020	Liga 1	0	0	0	0	—		0	0	0	0
Madura United	2021–22	Liga 1	6	0	0	0	—		1 (Note: Appearances in Menpora Cup)	0	7	0
Madura United	Total		6	0	0	0	—		1	0	7	0
Persija Jakarta (loan)	2021–22	Liga 1	3	0	0	0	—		0	0	3	0
PSM Makassar	2022–23	Liga 1	1	0	0	0	0	0	2 (Note: Appearances in Indonesia President's Cup)	0	3	0
Persis Solo	2023–24	Liga 1	3	0	0	0	0	0	0	0	3	0
PSIM Yogyakarta (loan)	2023–24	Liga 2	7	0	0	0	0	0	0	0	7	0
PSIM Yogyakarta	2024–25	Liga 2	12	0	0	0	0	0	0	0	12	0
Semen Padang	2025–26	Super League	21	1	0	0	–		0	0	21	1
PSMS Medan	2026–27	Championship	1	0	0	0	–		0	0	1	0
Career total			61	1	0	0	0	0	3	0	64	1

== Honours ==
=== Club ===
PSM Makassar

- Liga 1: 2022–23

PSIM Yogyakarta

- Liga 2: 2024–25

=== International ===
Indonesia U-16

- AFF U-16 Youth Championship runner-up: 2013

Indonesia U-19

- AFF U-19 Youth Championship third place: 2017, 2018

Indonesia U-22

- AFF U-22 Youth Championship: 2019
