= Titus Bonai =

Indonesian professional footballer

Personal information
- Full name: Titus Jhon Londouw Bonai
- Date of birth: 4 March 1989 (age 37)
- Place of birth: Jayapura, Indonesia
- Height: 1.69 m (5 ft 7 in)
- Position: Forward

Youth career
- 2001–2008: Persipura Jayapura
- 2006–2008: PON Papua

Senior career*
Years	Team	Apps	(Gls)
2008–2009	Bontang	15	(3)
2009–2010	Persiram Raja Ampat	25	(17)
2010–2012	Persipura Jayapura	32	(10)
2012–2013	Semen Padang	5	(2)
2014	Persipura Jayapura	13	(2)
2015	Sriwijaya	3	(0)
2016	Karketu Dili	12	(8)
2016–2017	PSM Makassar	37	(11)
2018	Borneo	28	(7)
2019	Persipura Jayapura	26	(13)
2020–2021	Borneo	1	(1)
2020	→ Muba Babel United (loan)	0	(0)
2021	Muba Babel United	0	(0)
2021	PSMS Medan	3	(1)
2022	PSIS Semarang	3	(0)
Total		203	(75)

International career
2009–2011	Indonesia U23	9	(6)
2012–2015	Indonesia	9	(1)
Medal record
Men's football
Representing Indonesia
Southeast Asian Games
Silver medal – second place	Jakarta-Palembang 2011	Team
- * Club domestic league appearances and goals

Titus Jhon Londouw Bonai (born 4 March 1989), nicknamed Tibo, is an Indonesian former footballer who played as a forward.

== Club career ==
Bonai began his career with the Persipura Jayapura U21 in 2008; he also underwent training for the team PON Papua. He has played for Bontang and Persiram Raja Ampat and later for Persipura Jayapura again. In 2012, he joined a Thailand club BEC Tero Sasana, but failed to secure a contract. Later he was signed by Indonesia Premier League club Semen Padang.

In November 2014, he signed with Sriwijaya. Soon afterwards, he was appointed as captain of the team for the 2015 Sriwijaya F.C. season.

== International career ==
He earned his first cap for the Indonesia U23 team in May 2009, in a Friendly match against the Iran U23. Bonai received his first senior international cap against the Philippines on 5 June 2012.

== Personal life ==
Titus is the brother of Arthur Barrios Bonai.

== Career statistics ==
=== International ===
Indonesia national team
Year	Apps	Goals
2012	4	0
2013	5	1
Total	9	1

=== International goals ===
Titus Bonai: International under-23 goals

Goal	Date	Venue	Opponent	Score	Result	Competition
1	9 February 2011	Po Kong Village Road Park, San Po Kong, Hong Kong	Hong Kong U23	0–3	1–4	Friendly
2	23 February 2011	Gelora Sriwijaya Stadium, Palembang, Indonesia	Turkmenistan U23	1–0	1–3	2012 AFC Men's Pre-Olympic Tournament
3	7 November 2011	Gelora Bung Karno Stadium, Jakarta, Indonesia	Cambodia U23	1–0	6–0	2011 Southeast Asian Games
4	11 November 2011	Gelora Bung Karno Stadium, Jakarta, Indonesia	Singapore U23	2–0	2–0	2011 Southeast Asian Games
5	13 November 2011	Gelora Bung Karno Stadium, Jakarta, Indonesia	Thailand U23	1–0	3–1	2011 Southeast Asian Games
6	19 November 2011	Gelora Bung Karno Stadium, Jakarta, Indonesia	Vietnam U23	2–0	2–0	2011 Southeast Asian Games

Titus Bonai: International goals
No.	Date	Venue	Opponent	Score	Result	Competition
1	1 November 2013	Gelora Bung Karno Stadium, Jakarta, Indonesia	Kyrgyzstan	3–0	4–0	Friendly

== Honours ==
Persipura Jayapura

- Indonesia Super League: 2010–11

Semen Padang

- Indonesian Community Shield: 2013

Indonesia U-23

- SEA Games silver medal: 2011

Individual

- Indonesian Soccer Awards: Best 11 2019
