= Roby Andika =

Indonesian footballer (born 1999)

Personal information
- Full name: Roby Andika
- Date of birth: 26 January 1999 (age 27)
- Place of birth: Palembang, Indonesia
- Height: 1.70 m (5 ft 7 in)
- Position: Midfielder

Youth career
- 2017–2018: Sriwijaya

Senior career*
Years	Team	Apps	(Gls)
2018–2019	Sriwijaya	5	(0)
2020–2021	Muba United	0	(0)
2025–2026	Sriwijaya	2	(0)
- * Club domestic league appearances and goals as of 24 January 2026

Roby Andika (born 26 January 1999) is an Indonesian professional footballer who plays as a midfielder.

== Club career ==
=== Muba Babel United ===
He was signed for Muba Babel United to play in Liga 2 in the 2020 season.
