= Ryan Wiradinata =

Indonesian footballer

Personal information
- Full name: Ryan Wiradinata
- Date of birth: 13 July 1990 (age 36)
- Place of birth: Palu, Indonesia
- Height: 1.70 m (5 ft 7 in)
- Position: Defensive midfielder

Team information
- Current team: Persipal Palu
- Number: 13

Youth career
- 2009–2011: Persipal Palu
- 2011: PS Matra
- 2011–2012: Persbul Buol
- 2012–2013: PSIS Semarang

Senior career*
Years	Team	Apps	(Gls)
2014	PS Mojokerto Putra	5	(0)
2015	Persipal Palu	0	(0)
2016–2017	Celebest	29	(2)
2018	TIRA-Persikabo	23	(0)
2019	Sriwijaya	20	(2)
2020–2021	Persela Lamongan	1	(0)
2021	Muba Babel United	9	(0)
2022–2023	Persikabo 1973	3	(0)
2023–2024	Sriwijaya	12	(0)
2024–	Persipal Palu	14	(0)
- * Club domestic league appearances and goals as of 28 December 2025

Ryan Wiradinata (born 13 July 1990) is an Indonesian professional footballer who plays as a defensive midfielder for Liga 2 club Persipal Palu.

== Club career ==
=== Persela Lamongan ===
He was signed for Persela Lamongan to play in Liga 1 in the 2020 season. This season was suspended on 27 March 2020 due to the COVID-19 pandemic. The season was abandoned and was declared void on 20 January 2021.

=== Muba Babel United ===
In 2021, Wiradinata signed a contract with Indonesian Liga 2 club Muba Babel United. He made his league debut on 6 October against Sriwijaya at the Gelora Sriwijaya Stadium, Palembang.
