= Muhammad Alwi Slamat =

Indonesian footballer (born 1998)

Alwi Slamat
Personal information
- Full name: Muhammad Alwi Slamat
- Date of birth: 16 December 1998 (age 27)
- Place of birth: Tulehu, Indonesia
- Height: 1.70 m (5 ft 7 in)
- Positions: Midfielder; left-back

Team information
- Current team: Semen Padang
- Number: 88

Youth career
- 2014–2015: Semen Padang
- 2016: PS TNI

Senior career*
Years	Team	Apps	(Gls)
2016	Semen Padang	0	(0)
2017	PS TNI	2	(0)
2017–2018	PSMS Medan	29	(1)
2019–2023	Persebaya Surabaya	73	(1)
2023–2026	Malut United	50	(0)
2026–	Semen Padang	0	(0)

International career
2014–2016	Indonesia U19	4	(0)
- * Club domestic league appearances and goals as of 23 May 2026

Muhammad Alwi Slamat (born 16 December 1998) is an Indonesian professional footballer who plays for Championship club Semen Padang as a midfielder, he can also operate as a left-back.

== International career ==
In 2016, Alwi Slamat represented the Indonesia U-19, in the 2016 AFF U-19 Youth Championship.

== Career statistics ==
=== Club ===
As of match played 23 May 2026

Club	Season	League			Cup (Note: Includes Piala Indonesia)		Other (Note: Appearances in Indonesia President's Cup)		Total	
Club	Season	Division	Apps	Goals	Apps	Goals	Apps	Goals	Apps	Goals
Semen Padang	2016	ISC A	0	0	0	0	0	0	0	0
PS TNI	2017	Liga 1	2	0	0	0	2	0	4	0
PSMS Medan	2017	Liga 2	17	0	0	0	0	0	17	0
PSMS Medan	2018	Liga 1	12	1	0	0	6	0	18	1
PSMS Medan	Total		29	1	0	0	6	0	35	1
Persebaya Surabaya	2019	Liga 1	13	0	2	0	2	0	17	0
Persebaya Surabaya	2020	Liga 1	1	0	0	0	0	0	1	0
Persebaya Surabaya	2021–22	Liga 1	28	1	0	0	4 (Note: Appearances in Menpora Cup)	0	32	1
Persebaya Surabaya	2022–23	Liga 1	29	0	0	0	3	0	32	0
Persebaya Surabaya	2023–24	Liga 1	2	0	0	0	0	0	2	0
Persebaya Surabaya	Total		73	1	2	0	9	0	84	1
Malut United	2023–24	Liga 2	15	0	0	0	0	0	15	0
Malut United	2024–25	Liga 1	22	0	0	0	0	0	22	0
Malut United	2025–26	Super League	13	0	0	0	0	0	13	0
Malut United	Total		50	0	0	0	0	0	50	0
Semen Padang	2026–27	Championship	0	0	0	0	0	0	0	0
Career total			154	2	2	0	17	0	173	2

== Honours ==
=== Club ===
PS TNI U-21

- Indonesia Soccer Championship U-21: 2016

PSMS Medan

- Liga 2 runner-up: 2017

Persebaya Surabaya

- Liga 1 runner-up: 2019
- Indonesia President's Cup runner-up: 2019
- East Java Governor Cup: 2020

Malut United

- Liga 2 third place (play-offs): 2023–24
