= Makan Konaté =

Malian footballer

Personal information
- Full name: Makan Konatè
- Date of birth: 10 November 1991 (age 35)
- Place of birth: Bamako, Mali
- Height: 1.78 m (5 ft 10 in)
- Position: Attacking midfielder

Team information
- Current team: Isenmulang Kalteng
- Number: 10

Senior career*
Years	Team	Apps	(Gls)
2008–2011	Stade Malien	20	(2)
2011–2012	Al Akhdhar	11	(1)
2012–2013	PSPS Pekanbaru	16	(6)
2013	Barito Putera	14	(6)
2014–2015	Persib Bandung	30	(14)
2016–2017	T-Team	21	(6)
2018	Sriwijaya	15	(0)
2018–2019	Arema	51	(29)
2020	Persebaya Surabaya	2	(0)
2021	Terengganu	20	(1)
2021–2022	Persija Jakarta	14	(7)
2022–2023	RANS Nusantara	33	(8)
2023	Barito Putera	15	(2)
2024	Persikabo 1973	6	(2)
2025–	Isenmulang Kalteng	32	(15)
- * Club domestic league appearances and goals as of 8 May 2026

Makan Konaté (born 10 November 1991) is a Malian professional footballer who plays as an attacking midfielder for Super League club Isenmulang Kalteng.

== Club career ==
=== Persib Bandung ===
In November 2013, he signed with Persib. On 2 February 2014, Konaté made his league debut by starting in a 1–0 win against Sriwijaya. And he also scored his first goal for the team, he scored in the 82nd minute from the penalty at the Jalak Harupat Stadium, With this result, Persib won their first win in the 2014 Indonesia Super League competition. On 10 June 2014, Konaté scored his first two goals for the club in a 3–1 win over PS Barito Putera. On 10 October 2014, he scored Persib's opening goal in a 3–2 away win over Mitra Kukar. On 4 November 2014, Konaté scored the winning goal for Persib against Arema in the 112th minute, the score ended 3–1 until the second half of extra time was over, while bringing Persib to the final match. He was part of the team that won the 2014 Indonesia Super League, In this match, Persib managed to beat Persipura Jayapura through a penalty shootout (5–3). On November 20, 2014, he signed a two-year contract with Persib.

==== 2015 season ====
On 4 April 2015, Konaté made his debut of the new league season match against Semen Padang at Jalak Harupat Stadium. On 7 April 2015, Konaté scored his first league goals of the season in a 3–0 win over Persipasi Bandung Raya. In this season, Konate only made 2 appearances and scored 1 goal. This is because this season was officially discontinued by PSSI on 2 May 2015 due to a ban by Imam Nahrawi, Minister of Youth and Sports Affairs, against PSSI to run any football competition.

=== T-Team ===
In January 2016, he joins Malaysia Super League team based in Kuala Terengganu, T-Team.

=== Sriwijaya FC ===
In December 2017, he moved to Indonesia from Malaysia to join and play for Indonesia club Sriwijaya of the Liga 1 after he was sold by T-Team. He came to Indonesia along with Rahmad Darmawan who was known as his coach when he played for the Malaysia Premier League club T-Team for two seasons.

=== Arema ===
On 15 July 2018, Konaté was signed for Arema to play in Liga 1 in the 2018 season. He made his league debut on 21 July 2018 in a match against Sriwijaya at the Gelora Sriwijaya Stadium, Palembang. On 27 July 2018, Konaté scored his first goal for Arema in a 4–3 loss against Mitra Kukar at the Aji Imbut Stadium. On 11 August 2018, Konaté scored his first two goals for the club in a 2–2 draw over Borneo Samarinda. On 9 December 2018, Arema exercised an option to extend Konaté's contract to the January 2020.

On 3 February 2019, Konaté made his debut of 2018–19 Piala Indonesia 2nd Leg match against Persita Tangerang. He also scored the opening goal in the 24th minute; the score ended 3–0 with an aggregate of 7–1. With this result, Arema qualified for the round of 16 of the Piala Indonesia. On 13 March 2019, Konaté scored his first goal of the pre-season President's Cup, the opening goal against Persita Tangerang in a 6–1 win in the 2019 Indonesia President's Cup. On 29 June 2019, Konaté scored his first Liga 1 goal of the season for Arema in a 2–1 loss against Persikabo 1973. On 16 July 2019, he scored hattrick in a 4–1 win against Badak Lampung at Kanjuruhan Stadium, this is the first hat-trick in his career as a footballer. On 15 August 2019, he scored one goal and assisted another as Arema won 4–0 against rival Persebaya Surabaya at Kanjuruhan. In January 2020, Konaté officially did not renew his contract with Arema for the 2020 season, this was because the team failed to agree on the contract value requested by him, so he chose to leave. He contributed with 16 goals and 11 assists during 2019 Liga 1 with Arema.

=== Persebaya Surabaya ===
On 16 January 2020, Konaté moved to Surabaya and signed one-year contract with Persebaya Surabaya. Konaté made his Persebaya debut in a pre-season friendly against Malaysia Super League club Sabah on 8 February 2020. On 29 February 2020, Konaté made his league debut in a 1–1 draw over 2018 Liga 3 champion Persik Kediri at Gelora Bung Tomo Stadium. In December 2020, Konaté officially left Persebaya, he admitted that he could not wait for the certainty of the continuation of the 2020 Liga 1, the league was officially discontinued due to the COVID-19 pandemic. He only made two appearances with the club during 2020 Liga 1, however, while at Persebaya, he managed to achieve an achievement in the pre-season 2020 East Java Governor Cup, he succeeded in bringing Persebaya to champions and won the best player award.

=== Terengganu ===
On 27 January 2021, Konaté signed a one-year contract with Malaysia Super League club Terengganu on a free transfer, along with David da Silva. He made his league debut for Terengganu when he was part of the starting lineup of a 2021 Malaysia Super League match against UiTM on 6 March 2021, in which Terengganu won. On 16 April 2021, Konaté scored his first league goal for Terengganu in a 1–0 victory over Kuala Lumpur City at the Sultan Mizan Zainal Abidin Stadium.

While he had a good season in his second year overseas with 20 appearances and one goals, Konate decided to return Indonesia at the end of the contract year.

=== Persija Jakarta ===
On 29 December 2021, Konaté return to Indonesia and signed one-year contract with Persija Jakarta for the 2021–22 Liga 1. On 11 January 2022, Konaté made his league debut by starting in a 1–2 loss against 2013 ISL champion Persipura Jayapura. And he also scored his first goal for the team, he scored in the 94th minute at Kapten I Wayan Dipta Stadium. On 14 February 2022, Konaté scored a brace for the club in a 3–3 draw over Persebaya Surabaya. and scored another brace for the club in a 0–4 win over Persikabo 1973 on 13 March 2022.

On 16 June 2022, Konaté officially left Persija Jakarta. He has said goodbye by writing an emotional message on his personal Instagram account, Konaté appeared 14 times with Persija in the 2021–2022 season. He has proven himself to be a midfielder who is still blessed with a goal-scoring instinct. Konaté scored seven goals and two assists. However, he joined Persija only lasted half a season.

=== RANS Nusantara ===
Konaté was signed for RANS Nusantara to play in Liga 1 in the 2022–23 season. He made his league debut on 23 July 2022 in a match against PSIS Semarang and he also scored his first goal for the team, he scored in the 85th minute at Jatidiri Stadium. On 10 September 2022, he scored RANS's opening goal in a 1–1 draw over Persik Kediri. His form in December saw him score two further goals in losses against Persis Solo (6–1), and losses against Persita Tangerang (4–1).

On 25 January 2023, he scored in a 4–4 draw over Bali United.

== International career ==
He was part of the Mali U-17 and Mali U-19.

== Personal life ==
Konaté is a devout Muslim who observes the Islamic month of Ramadan, frequently attends the Mosque and performs Sujud after scoring goals.

== Honours ==
Stade Malien

- Malian Première Division: 2009–10

Persib Bandung

- Indonesia Super League: 2014
- President's Cup: 2015

Sriwijaya

- East Kalimantan Governor Cup: 2018

Arema

- President's Cup: 2019

Persebaya Surabaya

- East Java Governor Cup: 2020

Individual

- East Kalimantan Governor Cup Best Player: 2018
- Liga 1 Team of the Season: 2019
- East Java Governor Cup Best Player: 2020
- Indonesian Soccer Awards: Best 11 2019
- Indonesian Soccer Awards: Best Midfielder 2019
