= Zulchrizal Abdul Gamal =

Indonesian footballer

Zuchrizal Abdul Gamal
Personal information
- Full name: Zuchrizal Abdul Gamal
- Date of birth: 6 June 1988 (age 38)
- Place of birth: Ternate City, Indonesia
- Height: 1.70 m (5 ft 7 in)
- Position: Right back

Senior career*
Years	Team	Apps	(Gls)
2005–2007	Persiter Ternate	59	(2)
2011–2014	Mitra Kukar	38	(0)
2014–2015	Semen Padang	24	(0)
2015–2019	Mitra Kukar	59	(1)

International career
2006	Indonesia U16	2	(0)
- * Club domestic league appearances and goals as of 11 July 2019

Zuchrizal Abdul Gamal (born June 6, 1988) is an Indonesian professional footballer who played as a right back.

== Career ==
=== Persiter Ternate ===
Gamal started his football career for Persiter Ternate when still a student in 2005. Gamal helped bring his team to the third place Liga Indonesia First Division in 2005, once led the team promotion to the First Division.

=== Mitra Kukar ===
Gamal finally docked with Mitra Kukar, who was promoted to the ISL 2011/2012

=== Semen Padang ===
On November 16, 2014, he signed with Semen Padang.

=== Mitra Kukar ===
At the tournament Presidents Cup 2015, Semen Padang lends him along with his partner, namely Hendra Bayauw, Saepulloh Maulana, Airlangga Sucipto and Eka Ramdani to the club Mitra Kukar is a club that once defended in 2011. After the contract expired at Semen Padang, he went back to his old club, namely Mitra Kukar. Together with Mitra Kukar, he made history by winning the Sudirman Cup in 2015, although in the final he did not play because of a red card he earned while playing in the semi-final 2nd leg against Arema Cronus dated January 17, 2016 in Kanjuruhan Stadium, Malang. In the final which took place at GBK Stadium, Jakarta, Mitra Kukar beat Semen Padang F.C. 2-1
