= Arif Satria =

Indonesian association football player

Personal information
- Full name: Arif Satria
- Date of birth: 17 September 1995 (age 31)
- Place of birth: Musi Rawas, Indonesia
- Height: 1.83 m (6 ft 0 in)
- Position: Centre-back

Team information
- Current team: Sumsel United
- Number: 28

Youth career
- 2014–2015: Semen Padang

Senior career*
Years	Team	Apps	(Gls)
2016–2017	Semen Padang	0	(0)
2017	→ PSP Padang (loan)	4	(0)
2018–2019	Persela Lamongan	56	(2)
2020–2022	Persebaya Surabaya	28	(0)
2022–2024	RANS Nusantara	33	(0)
2023–2024	→ Bhayangkara (loan)	8	(0)
2024–2026	Bhayangkara	20	(2)
2026	→ Adhyaksa (loan)	14	(0)
2026–	Sumsel United	1	(0)

International career
2021	Indonesia	3	(0)
- * Club domestic league appearances and goals as of 13 September 2026

Arif Satria (born 17 September 1995) is an Indonesian professional footballer who plays as a centre-back for Championship club Sumsel United.

== Club career ==
=== Persela Lamongan ===
After years of playing in lower leagues, Satria in 2018 signed a contract with Liga 1 club Persela Lamongan. He made his first-team debut for Persela after starting the 2018 Liga 1 match against Persipura Jayapura on 24 March 2018, in which Persela lost 2–1. He quickly rose as the team's starting center back, appearing in 56 matches in two seasons.

=== Persebaya Surabaya ===
Satria in 2020 signed for Persebaya Surabaya to play in the 2020 Liga 1 season and made his debut on 29 February 2020 as a starter in a match against Persik Kediri. Despite the 2020 season being canceled after three matches due to the COVID-19 pandemic, Satria's performance at Persebaya caught the attention of Indonesia national football team coach Shin Tae-yong who invited him to join several training sessions.

=== RANS Nusantara ===
Satria was signed for RANS Nusantara to play in Liga 1 in the 2022–23 season. He made his league debut on 6 December 2022 in a match against Persis Solo at the Maguwoharjo Stadium, Sleman.

== International career ==
Satria, who has no experience playing in junior national teams, received a call to join the Indonesia senior team in May 2021. He made his debut with Indonesia on 4 June 2021 in a 2022 FIFA World Cup qualification against Thailand.

== Career statistics ==
=== Club ===
As of 13 September 2026

Club	Season	League			Cup (Note: Includes Piala Indonesia)		Continental		Other (Note: Appearances in Indonesia President's Cup)		Total	
Club	Season	Division	Apps	Goals	Apps	Goals	Apps	Goals	Apps	Goals	Apps	Goals
Semen Padang	2016	ISC A	0	0	0	0	—		0	0	0	0
PSP Padang (loan)	2017	Liga 3	4	0	0	0	—		0	0	4	0
Persela Lamongan	2018	Liga 1	32	1	0	0	—		3	0	35	1
Persela Lamongan	2019	Liga 1	24	1	2	0	—		4	0	30	1
Persela Lamongan	Total		56	2	2	0	—		7	0	65	2
Persebaya Surabaya	2020	Liga 1	1	0	0	0	—		0	0	1	0
Persebaya Surabaya	2021–22	Liga 1	27	0	0	0	—		2 (Note: Appearances in Menpora Cup)	1	29	1
Persebaya Surabaya	Total		28	0	0	0	—		2	1	30	1
RANS Nusantara	2022–23	Liga 1	22	0	0	0	—		0	0	22	0
RANS Nusantara	2023–24	Liga 1	11	0	0	0	—		0	0	11	0
RANS Nusantara	Total		33	0	0	0	—		0	0	33	0
Bhayangkara (loan)	2023–24	Liga 1	8	0	0	0	—		0	0	8	0
Bhayangkara	2024–25	Liga 2	20	2	0	0	—		0	0	20	2
Adhyaksa (loan)	2025–26	Championship	14	0	0	0	—		0	0	14	0
Sumsel United	2026–27	Championship	1	0	0	0	—		0	0	1	0
Career total			164	4	2	0	0	0	9	1	175	5

=== International ===
As of match played 11 June 2021

Appearances and goals by national team and year
National team	Year	Apps	Goals
Indonesia	2021	3	0
Total		3	0

== Honours ==
=== Club ===
Persebaya Surabaya

- East Java Governor Cup: 2020

Bhayangkara

- Liga 2 runner-up: 2024–25
