= Airlangga Sutjipto =

Indonesian footballer

Personal information
- Full name: Airlangga Sutjipto
- Date of birth: 22 November 1985 (age 40)
- Place of birth: Jakarta, Indonesia
- Height: 1.70 m (5 ft 7 in)
- Position: Forward

Senior career*
Years	Team	Apps	(Gls)
2004–2005	PS Trisakti	15	(7)
2005−2008	Deltras Sidoarjo	70	(22)
2004–2005	→ Persiba Bantul (loan)	20	(6)
2008−2013	Persib Bandung	107	(21)
2014–2015	Semen Padang	27	(6)
2016–2017	Sriwijaya	34	(9)
2018	Persib Bandung	6	(0)
2019	Sriwijaya	23	(2)
2020	Muba Babel United	0	(0)
2021	Mitra Kukar	10	(1)
2023–2024	ASIOP	8	(2)
Total		320	(76)

International career
2005	Indonesia U20	?	(?)
2006−2007	Indonesia U23	?	(1)
2007	Indonesia	1	(0)
- * Club domestic league appearances and goals as of 7 May 2024

Airlangga "Ronggo" Sutjipto (also spelled Sucipto, born 22 November 1985) is an Indonesian former footballer who plays as a forward. He played for the Indonesia national football team at the 2007 Southeast Asian Games in Thailand.

== Club career ==
=== Deltras and Persib ===
Airlangga started his professional career at Deltras Sidoarjo. In the 2008/2009 season, Persib recruited him from Deltras. He made his debut in an away match against Persiwa Wamena. He scored his first goal against Bontang FC in Bontang.

=== Semen Padang ===
On 2014 season, Airlangga joined Semen Padang. Where he scored his first goal against PS Barito Putera.

=== Mitra Kukar ===
In the 2015 Indonesia President's Cup, the club lend Airlangga with his colleague Eka Ramdani, Abdul Gamal, Hendra Bayauw, and Saepulloh Maulana to Mitra Kukar. with Mitra Kukar, he helped his club to 4th place in the tournament after the President's Cup in a match against Arema in a loss 2-0.

=== Sriwijaya ===
In 2016, he was recruited to Sriwijaya F.C. for East Kalimantan Governor Cup tournament in 2016 under coach Benny Dollo. And in the 2016 Indonesia Soccer Championship A, Airlangga made his debut against Mitra Kukar.
