= Marlon da Silva =

Brazilian footballer

Personal information
- Full name: Marlon da Silva de Moura
- Date of birth: 5 February 1990 (age 36)
- Place of birth: Belford Roxo, Brazil
- Height: 1.83 m (6 ft 0 in)
- Position: Forward

Senior career*
Years	Team	Apps	(Gls)
2009–2011	Duque de Caxias	12	(0)
2010	→ Boavista (loan)	0	(0)
2011–2013	Boavista	0	(0)
2014	Bonsucesso	0	(0)
2014	Betim	3	(0)
2015	Resende	4	(0)
2016–2017	Mitra Kukar	30	(16)
2017	Persiba Balikpapan	25	(7)
2018	Borneo Samarinda	13	(6)
2018	Alki Oroklini	4	(0)
2019	Ubon United	5	(2)
2020	Palmas	5	(4)
2020–2021	Águila	27	(6)
Total		128	(41)
- * Club domestic league appearances and goals

Marlon da Silva de Moura (born 5 February 1990) is a Brazilian former professional footballer who currently plays as a forward.

== Career ==
Da Silva was born in Belford Roxo.

On 22 April 2020, it was confirmed that Marlon would join Águila in El Salvador in the summer 2020.
