= 2018 East Kalimantan Governor's Cup =

Tournament details
- Country: Indonesia
- Dates: 23 February–4 March 2018
- Teams: 8

Final positions
- Champions: Sriwijaya
- Runners-up: Arema
- Third place: Persebaya
- Fourth place: Borneo

Tournament statistics
- Matches played: 16
- Goals scored: 46 (2.88 per match)
- Top goal scorer: (Brazil) Beto Gonçalves (4 goals)

Awards
- Best player: (Mali) Makan Konaté

The 2018 Piala Gubernur Kaltim (lit. '2018 East Kalimantan Governor's Cup') was the second edition of East Kalimantan Governor's Cup for association football competition. It was organized by provincial association of both PSSI and KONI as pre-season tournament during 2018 Liga 1 season break. The tournament started on 23 February 2018 and ended on 4 March 2018. The broadcasting rights were granted solely to MNCTV.

== Teams ==
Eight clubs participated in the 2018 East Kalimantan Governor's Cup. The clubs were divided into two groups, each filled with four participants. Bali United withdrew from the competition due to the absence of their coach and lack of players, therefore PSIS Semarang came in as replacement.

Club	Location	2017 season
Arema	Malang	9th in Liga 1
Borneo	Samarinda	8th in Liga 1
Madura United	Pamekasan	5th in Liga 1
Mitra Kukar	Tenggarong	10th in Liga 1
Persebaya	Surabaya	Liga 2 Champions
Persiba Balikpapan	Balikpapan	17th in Liga 1
PSIS	Semarang	Liga 2 Third-place
Sriwijaya	Palembang	11th in Liga 1

== Venues ==
Samarinda		Balikpapan
Segiri Stadium	Palaran Stadium	Batakan Stadium
Capacity: 18,000	Capacity: 67,075	Capacity: 40,000

== Group stage ==
=== Group A ===
- All matches played in Samarinda, East Kalimantan
- Times listed are local (UTC+8:00)

Pos	Team	Pld	W	D	L	GF	GA	GD	Pts	Qualification
1	Borneo (Note: Borneo won in penalty shoot-out against Mitra Kukar. (+1 point))	3	2	1	0	4	2	+2	8	Knockout stage
2	Arema	3	1	1	1	6	5	+1	4	Knockout stage
3	Mitra Kukar	3	1	1	1	4	4	0	4	
4	PSIS (Note: PSIS won in penalty shoot-out against Arema. (+1 point))	3	0	1	2	4	7	−3	2	

Updated to match(es) played on 27 February 2018. Source:
Notes:

23 February 2018
16:30

Borneo	0–0	Mitra Kukar
	Report
Penalties
Faubert (penalty scored); Lopičić (penalty scored); Lerby (penalty scored); da Silva (penalty scored); Baymatov (penalty scored)	5–4	(penalty missed) Rodríguez; (penalty scored) Rendy; (penalty scored) Bayu; (penalty scored) Anindito; (penalty scored) Yoo Jae-hoon

Palaran Stadium, Samarinda
23 February 2018
20:30

PSIS	2–2	Arema
Yulianto 35'; Bayu 78'	Report	Dedik 5'; Cunha 89'
Penalties
Haudi (penalty scored); Bayu (penalty scored); Gilang (penalty missed); Yulianto (penalty scored); Fauzan (penalty scored)	4–3	(penalty scored) Thiago; (penalty missed) Ataýew; (penalty scored) Cunha; (penalty scored) Gustavo; (penalty missed) Dedik

Palaran Stadium, Samarinda
Referee: Agus Fauzan Arifin

25 February 2018
16:30

Mitra Kukar	3–1	PSIS
Bayauw 19', 40'; Rodríguez 25'	Report	Aldaier 90+2'

Segiri Stadium, Samarinda
25 February 2018
20:30

Arema	1–2	Borneo
Dendi 73'	Report	Lerby 8'; da Silva 37'

Segiri Stadium, Samarinda
Referee: Thoriq Munir Alkatiri

27 February 2018
16:30

Borneo	2–1	PSIS
Tibo 47'; Firdaus 81'	Report	Conteh 83'

Segiri Stadium, Samarinda
Referee: Novari Ikhsan
27 February 2018
20:30

Arema	3–1	Mitra Kukar
Božović 26'; Dendi 56'; Dedik 86'	Report	Bayu 64'

Segiri Stadium, Samarinda
Referee: Thoriq Munir Alkatiri

=== Group B ===
- All matches played in Balikpapan, East Kalimantan
- Times listed are local (UTC+8:00)

Pos	Team	Pld	W	D	L	GF	GA	GD	Pts	Qualification
1	Persebaya (Note: Persebaya won in penalty shoot-out against Madura United. (+1 point))	3	2	1	0	6	2	+4	8	Knockout stage
2	Sriwijaya	3	2	0	1	3	2	+1	6	Knockout stage
3	Persiba Balikpapan	3	1	0	2	3	5	−2	3	
4	Madura United	3	0	1	2	2	5	−3	1	

Updated to match(es) played on 26 February 2018. Source:
Notes:

24 February 2018
16:30

Persiba Balikpapan	0–1	Sriwijaya
	Report	Beto 80'

Batakan Stadium, Balikpapan
Referee: Djumadi Effendi
24 February 2018
20:30

Madura United	1–1	Persebaya
Maitimo 30'	Report	Misbakhus 39'
Penalties
Maitimo (penalty scored); Chehoudi (penalty scored); Gonzáles (penalty scored); Rizky (penalty scored); Beltrame (penalty missed)	4–5	(penalty scored) Misbakhus; (penalty scored) Oktafianus; (penalty scored) Arthur; (penalty scored) Dutra; (penalty scored) Henrique

Batakan Stadium, Balikpapan
Referee: Muslimin

26 February 2018
16:30

Sriwijaya	2–0	Madura United
Dzhalilov 60'; Adam 77'	Report

Batakan Stadium, Balikpapan
Referee: Hamsir
26 February 2018
20:30

Persebaya	3–1	Persiba Balikpapan
Fauzi 81'; Rendy 84', 90+4'	Report	Bryan 43' (pen.)

Batakan Stadium, Balikpapan
Referee: Nusur Fadillah

28 February 2018
16:30

Persiba Balikpapan	2–1	Madura United
Oktovianto 62'; Turnando 67'	Report	Nurcahyo 54'

Batakan Stadium, Balikpapan
Referee: Nusur Fadillah
28 February 2018
20:30

Sriwijaya	0–2	Persebaya
	Report	Fandi 45+1'; Haay 61'

Batakan Stadium, Balikpapan
Referee: Mugino

== Knockout stage ==
Bracket

Semi-finals
2 March - Samarinda
Persebaya	0
Arema	2
2 March - Samarinda
Borneo	3 (4)
Sriwijaya	3 (5)

Final
4 March - Samarinda
Arema	2
Sriwijaya	3
Third place
4 March - Samarinda
Persebaya	1
Borneo	0

=== Semi-finals ===
2 March 2018
16:30 (UTC+8:00)

Persebaya	0–2	Arema
	Report	Thiago 65'; Hanif 85'

Palaran Stadium, Samarinda
Referee: Novari Ikhsan
2 March 2018
20:30 (UTC+8:00)

Borneo	3–3 (a.e.t.)	Sriwijaya
da Silva 26'; Lerby 47'; Tibo 88'	Report	Beto 60', 65'; Konaté 90+1'
Penalties
Faubert (penalty missed); Lopičić (penalty missed); Lerby (penalty scored); da Silva (penalty scored); Baymatov (penalty scored); Tibo (penalty scored); Eddy (penalty missed); Diego (penalty missed)	4–5	(penalty missed) Beto; (penalty scored) Konaté; (penalty missed) Tuasalamony; (penalty scored) Novan; (penalty scored) Dzhalilov; (penalty scored) Iskandar; (penalty missed) Zulfiandi; (penalty scored) Hamka

Palaran Stadium, Samarinda
Referee: Jerry Elly

=== Third place ===
4 March 2018
16:30 (UTC+8:00)

Persebaya	1–0	Borneo
Fauzi 77'

Palaran Stadium, Samarinda
Referee: Nusur Fadillah

=== Final ===
4 March 2018
20:30 (UTC+8:00)

Arema	2–3	Sriwijaya
Božović 23'; Thiago 81' (pen.)		Novan 10'; Beto 44'; Hamka 48'

Palaran Stadium, Samarinda
Referee: Muslimin

== Awards ==
Award	Player	Team
Best Player	(Mali) Makan Konaté	(Indonesia) Sriwijaya
Top Goalscorer	(Brazil) Alberto Gonçalves Da Costa	(Indonesia) Sriwijaya
Best Young Player	(Indonesia) Kurniawan Kartika Ajie	(Indonesia) Arema

== Goalscorers ==
There were 46 goals scored in 16 matches, for an average of 2.88 goals per match.

4 goals

- (Brazil) Beto Gonçalves

2 goals

- (Brazil) Marlon da Silva
- (Brazil) Thiago Furtuoso
- (Indonesia) Dedik Setiawan
- (Indonesia) Dendi Santoso
- (Indonesia) Hendra Bayauw
- (Indonesia) Lerby Eliandry
- (Indonesia) Rendy Irawan
- (Indonesia) Rishadi Fauzi
- (Indonesia) Titus Bonai
- (Montenegro) Balša Božović

1 goal

- (Brazil) Arthur Cunha da Rocha
- (Indonesia) Adam Alis
- (Indonesia) Aldaier Makatindu
- (Indonesia) Bayu Nugroho
- (Indonesia) Bayu Pradana
- (Indonesia) Beni Oktovianto
- (Indonesia) Bryan Cesar
- (Indonesia) Fandi Utomo
- (Indonesia) Fengky Turnando
- (Indonesia) Firdaus Ramadhan
- (Indonesia) Hamka Hamzah
- (Indonesia) Hanif Sjahbandi
- (Indonesia) Hari Nur Yulianto
- (Indonesia) Misbakhus Solikin
- (Indonesia) Novan Sasongko
- (Indonesia) Osvaldo Haay
- (Indonesia) Raphael Maitimo
- (Indonesia) Slamet Nurcahyo
- (Mali) Makan Konaté
- (Sierra Leone) Ibrahim Conteh
- (Spain) Fernando Rodríguez
- (Tajikistan) Manuchekhr Dzhalilov
