= Yogi Rahadian =

Indonesian footballer

Personal information
- Full name: Yogi Rahadian
- Date of birth: 27 October 1995 (age 31)
- Place of birth: Palembang, Indonesia
- Height: 5 ft 7 in (1.70 m)
- Position: Winger

Youth career
- 2010: Indonesia Football Academy
- 2011–2012: Manchester City
- 2012–2013: Deportivo Indonesia
- 2013–2014: Mitra Kukar

Senior career*
Years	Team	Apps	(Gls)
2014–2017	Mitra Kukar	62	(6)
2018	Sriwijaya	18	(1)
2019	Persija Jakarta	5	(0)
2019	Badak Lampung	2	(0)
2020	Muba Babel United	1	(0)
2021	PSG Pati	7	(1)
2022	Sriwijaya	0	(0)
2023–2024	Kalteng Putra	4	(0)

International career^{‡}
2011	Indonesia U16		
2014	Indonesia U23	1	(0)
- * Club domestic league appearances and goals as of 18 December 2023 ‡ National team caps and goals as of 21:09, 17 February 2015 (UTC)

Yogi Rahadian (born 27 October 1995) is an Indonesian professional footballer who plays as a winger.

== Career ==
In 2011, he had a four-month trial with Leicester City.

He played for Deportivo Indonesia before joining Mitra Kukar youth team in 2013. He was part of the team that achieved second place in the 2012–13 Indonesia Super League U-21.

== Honours ==
Mitra Kukar

- General Sudirman Cup: 2015

Persija Jakarta

- Piala Indonesia runner-up: 2018–19
