= Beri Rahmada =

Indonesian footballer

Personal information
- Full name: Beri Rahmada
- Date of birth: July 17, 1998 (age 28)
- Place of birth: Palembang, Indonesia
- Height: 1.75 m (5 ft 9 in)
- Position: Defender

Youth career
- Sriwijaya U-19

Senior career*
Years	Team	Apps	(Gls)
2018–2019	Sriwijaya	3	(0)
- * Club domestic league appearances and goals as of 24 November 2018

Beri Rahmada (born 17 July 1998) is an Indonesian former footballer who plays as a defender.
