= Rahmad Darmawan =

Indonesian footballer and coach

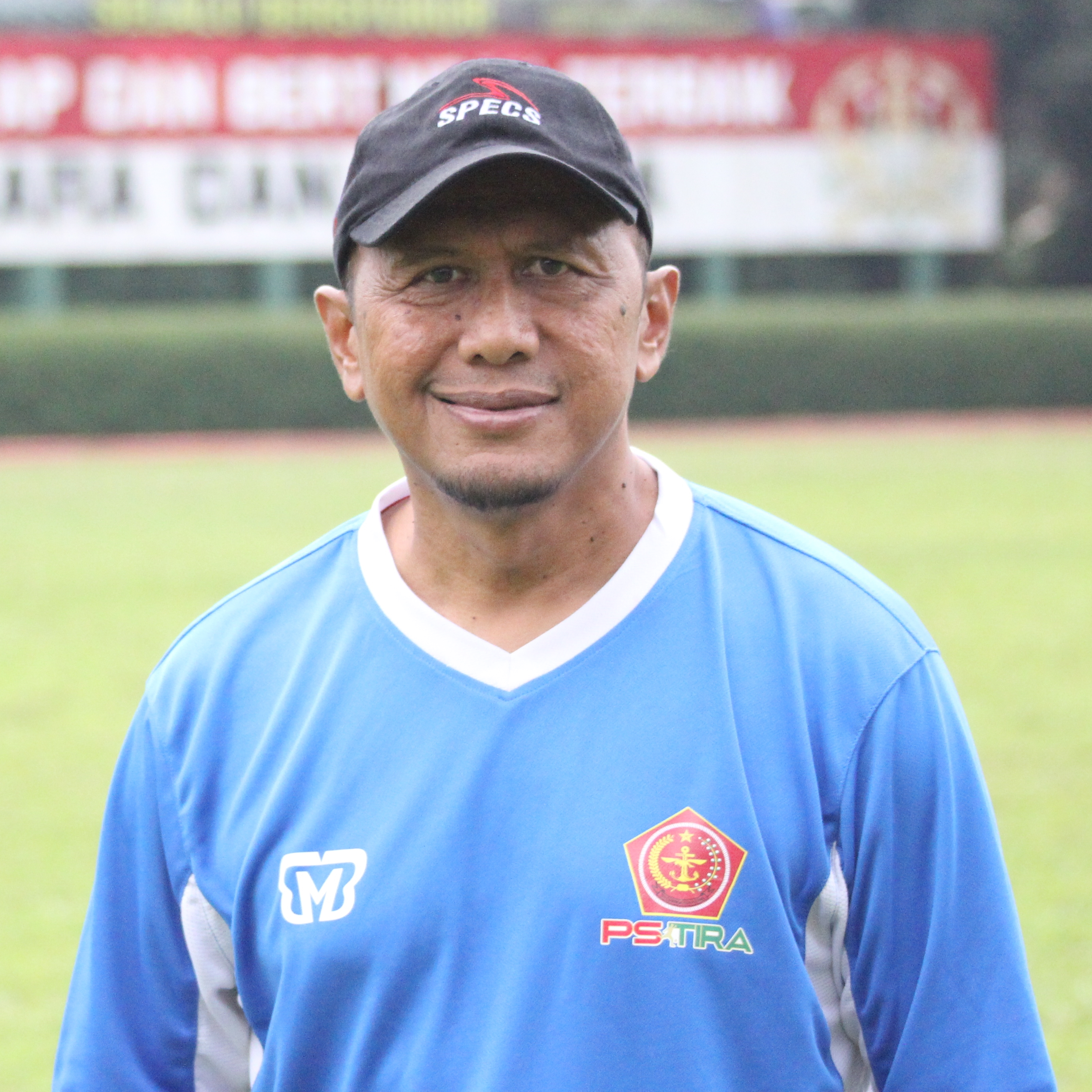
- Darmawan in 2019

Personal information
- Full name: Rahmad Darmawan
- Date of birth: 28 November 1966 (age 59)
- Place of birth: Metro, Indonesia
- Height: 1.70 m (5 ft 7 in)
- Position: Midfielder

Team information
- Current team: Persipura Jayapura (Manager)

Youth career
- 1979–1984: PS Pungur
- 1985: PON Lampung

Senior career*
Years	Team	Apps	(Gls)
1986–1991	Persija Jakarta		
1992–1993	ATM FA		
1994–1995	Persija Jakarta		
1996–1998	Persikota Tangerang		

International career
1986	Indonesia B		
1989–1993	Indonesia	15	(1)

Managerial career
- 1998–2000: Persikota (assistant)
- 2001–2004: Persikota
- 2002: Indonesia (assistant)
- 2005: Persipura
- 2006: Persija
- 2007–2010: Sriwijaya
- 2010–2011: Persija
- 2011: Indonesia (assistant)
- 2011: Indonesia U-23
- 2012: Pelita Jaya
- 2012–2013: Arema Cronus
- 2013: Indonesia (caretaker)
- 2013: Indonesia U-23
- 2013–2014: Persebaya ISL (Bhayangkara)
- 2014–2015: Persija Jakarta
- 2015–2017: T-Team
- 2017–2018: Sriwijaya
- 2018: Mitra Kukar
- 2019: TIRA-Persikabo
- 2020–2021: Madura United
- 2021: RANS Cilegon
- 2022: Barito Putera
- 2022–2023: RANS Nusantara
- 2023–2025: Barito Putera
- 2025: PSMS Medan (technical director)
- 2025–: Persipura Jayapura
Military career
Allegiance	Indonesia
Branch	Indonesian Navy
Service years	1991–2015
Rank	Major
- * Club domestic league appearances and goals

Rahmad Darmawan (born 28 November 1966) is an Indonesian former professional footballer who currently works as a coach or manager of Championship club Persipura Jayapura.

Darmawan started his coaching career with Persikota Tangerang before moving to Persipura Jayapura and later Sriwijaya. In his last season with Sriwijaya, Rahmad led the team to the Piala Indonesia title. Later he coached Persija Jakarta, Pelita Jaya and Arema Indonesia. In total he has won four championships with two clubs in the Indonesian League.

Darmawan was the coach of Indonesia under-23 national team, and the assistant coach of the Indonesia senior team, as well as caretaker of the senior team in 2013. He is a former Major in the Indonesian Navy.

== Career statistics ==
=== International ===
Appearances and goals by national team and year
National team	Year	Apps	Goals
Indonesia	1989	1	0
Indonesia	1992	2	0
Indonesia	1993	12	1
Total		15	1

Scores and results list Indonesia's goal tally first, score column indicates score after each Darmawan goal.

List of international goals scored by Rahmad Darmawan
No.	Date	Venue	Cap	Opponent	Score	Result	Competition
1	28 April 1993	National Stadium, Kallang, Singapore	9	North Korea	1–1	1–2	1994 FIFA World Cup qualification

== Honours ==
=== Player ===
Persikota Tangerang

- Liga Indonesia Second Division: 1996
- Liga Indonesia First Division: 1997

Indonesia

- SEA Games bronze medal: 1989

=== Manager ===
Persipura Jayapura

- Liga Indonesia Premier Division: 2005

Sriwijaya

- Liga Indonesia Premier Division: 2007–08
- Copa Indonesia/Piala Indonesia: 2007–08, 2008–09, 2010
- Indonesia President's Cup 3rd place: 2018
- East Kalimantan Governor Cup: 2018

Indonesia U23

- SEA Games silver Medal: 2011, 2013
- Islamic Solidarity Games silver Medal: 2013

==== Individual ====
- Copa Indonesia Best Coach: 2009
- Liga 1 Coach of the Month: February 2022
