= Amadou Koïta =

Malian politician

Amadou Koïta is a Malian politician. He has been the Malian Minister of Youth and Citizenship since July 7, 2016.
