= Rafif Putra =

Indonesian footballer

Personal information
- Full name: Muhammad Rafif Putra Adri
- Date of birth: 25 February 1999 (age 27)
- Place of birth: Indonesia
- Height: 1.72 m (5 ft 8 in)
- Position: Defensive midfielder

Team information
- Current team: Persiraja Banda Aceh
- Number: 88

Youth career
- Sriwijaya

Senior career*
Years	Team	Apps	(Gls)
2018–2019	Sriwijaya	2	(0)
2021–2024	ASIOP	9	(1)
2024–2025	Persipal Palu	16	(0)
2025	Sriwijaya	9	(1)
2026	Persikad Depok	4	(0)
2026–	Persiraja Banda Aceh	1	(0)
- * Club domestic league appearances and goals as of 2 October 2026

Muhammad Rafif Putra Adri (born 25 February 1999) is an Indonesian footballer who plays as a defensive midfielder for Championship club Persiraja Banda Aceh.
