= Sandy Firmansyah =

Indonesian footballer

Personal information
- Full name: Muhammad Sandy Firmansyah
- Date of birth: 7 July 1983 (age 43)
- Place of birth: Malang, Indonesia
- Height: 1.80 m (5 ft 11 in)
- Position: Goalkeeper

Team information
- Current team: Adhyaksa F.C. (goalkeeper coach)

Senior career*
Years	Team	Apps	(Gls)
2008–2009	Bontang	5	(0)
2009–2010	Persitara North Jakarta	2	(0)
2010–2011	Barito Putera	19	(0)
2012–2014	Gresik United	7	(0)
2014	Persik Kediri	7	(0)
2015	Persepam Madura Utama	0	(0)
2016	Martapura	1	(0)
2016	Gresik United	9	(0)
2017–2018	Sriwijaya	11	(0)
2019	Arema	2	(0)
2020	PSIM Yogyakarta	1	(0)
2021	RANS Cilegon	1	(0)
Total		65	(0)

Managerial career
- 2022: Bekasi City (goalkeeper coach)
- 2023–2024: Kalteng Putra (goalkeeper coach)
- * Club domestic league appearances and goals

Muhamad Sandy Firmansyah (born 7 July 1983) is an Indonesian former professional footballer who last played as a goalkeeper for RANS Cilegon.

== Honours ==
=== Club ===
Sriwijaya

- East Kalimantan Governor Cup: 2018

Arema

- Indonesia President's Cup: 2019
