= Alan Henrique =

Brazilian footballer (born 1991)

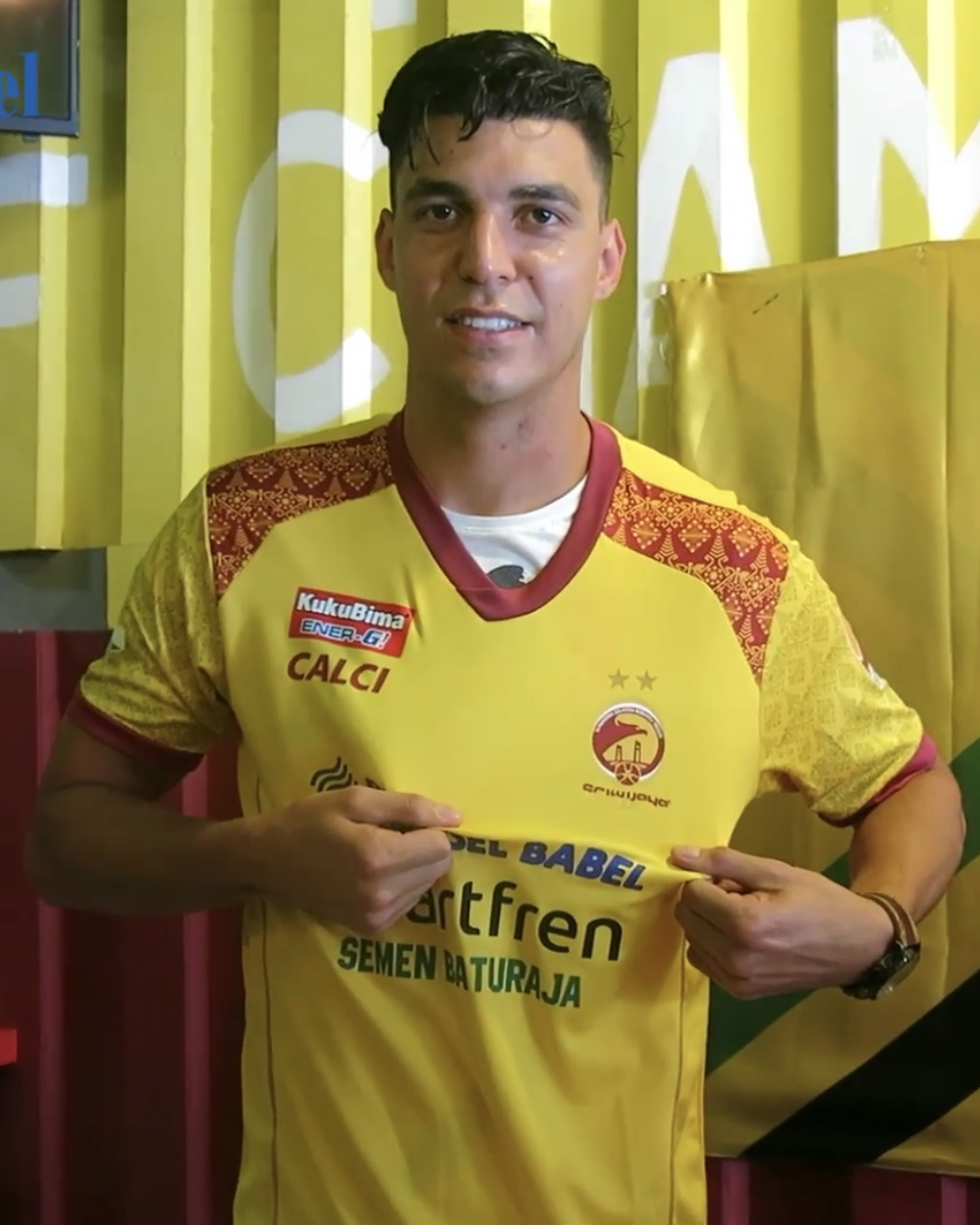
- Henrique with Sriwijaya in 2018

Personal information
- Full name: Alan Henrique Ferreira Bastos Soares
- Date of birth: 19 June 1991 (age 35)
- Place of birth: Belo Horizonte, Brazil
- Height: 1.89 m (6 ft 2 in)
- Position: Defender

Team information
- Current team: Penya Encarnada
- Number: 6

Youth career
- Vitória

Senior career*
Years	Team	Apps	(Gls)
2011–2015	Vitória	5	(0)
2012	→ Boa Esporte (loan)	4	(0)
2013	→ Botafogo (loan)	10	(0)
2014	→ Duque de Caxias (loan)	8	(0)
2014–2015	→ Beira-Mar (loan)	31	(1)
2015–2016	CD Nacional	5	(0)
2016	Umm Salal		
2017	Inter Turku	26	(3)
2018	Sriwijaya	16	(2)
2019–2020	Varzim	13	(2)
2020	Bylis	12	(0)
2021	IFK Mariehamn	14	(1)
2022	Lahti	6	(0)
2022–2023	Santa Lucía	10	(0)
2023	IFK Mariehamn	16	(0)
2025–	Penya Encarnada	26	(2)
- * Club domestic league appearances and goals as of 15 June 2026

Alan Henrique Ferreira Bastos Soares (born 19 June 1991) is a Brazilian professional footballer who plays as a defender for Andorran club Penya Encarnada.

== Career statistics ==
=== Club ===
As of match played 7 February 2018

Appearances and goals by club, season and competition
Club	Season	League			National Cup		League Cup		Continental		Other		Total	
Club	Season	Division	Apps	Goals	Apps	Goals	Apps	Goals	Apps	Goals	Apps	Goals	Apps	Goals
CD Nacional	2015–16	Primeira Liga	5	0	1	0	3	0	–		–		9	0
Inter Turku	2017	Veikkausliiga	26	4	3	1	–		–		–		29	5
Career total			31	4	4	1	3	0	-	-	-	-	38	5
