= Achmad Faris =

Indonesian professional footballer

Personal information
- Full name: Achmad Faris Ardiansyah
- Date of birth: 3 July 1993 (age 33)
- Place of birth: Gresik, Indonesia
- Height: 1.80 m (5 ft 11 in)
- Position: Defender

Team information
- Current team: RANS Nusantara
- Number: 48

Youth career
- 2011–2012: Persegres Gresik United
- 2012–2013: Sriwijaya U21

Senior career*
Years	Team	Apps	(Gls)
2014–2015	Kalteng Putra	10	(0)
2016–2017	Persegres Gresik United	43	(0)
2017–2018	Sriwijaya	25	(0)
2019	Mitra Kukar	22	(1)
2020	Badak Lampung	1	(0)
2021–2023	Dewa United	31	(1)
2022	→ Persita Tangerang (loan)	5	(0)
2023–2024	PSIM Yogyakarta	17	(2)
2024–2025	PSKC Cimahi	20	(1)
2025–2026	PSPS Pekanbaru	14	(0)
2026	Persiku Kudus	4	(0)
2026–	RANS Nusantara	0	(0)

International career
2012	Indonesia U21	6	(0)
2012	Indonesia U23	1	(0)
- * Club domestic league appearances and goals as of 27 April 2026

Achmad Faris Ardiansyah (born 3 July 1993) is an Indonesian professional footballer who plays as a defender for Championship club RANS Nusantara.

== Club career ==
=== Persegres Gresik United ===
Achmad Faris joined the squad for 2016 Indonesia Soccer Championship A. He made his debut against PS TNI in the third week of Indonesia Soccer Championship as a substitute.

=== Mitra Kukar ===
He was signed for Mitra Kukar to play in Liga 2 in the 2019 season.

=== Badak Lampung ===
In 2020, Achmad Faris signed a one-year contract with Indonesian Liga 2 club Badak Lampung. This season was suspended on 27 March 2020 due to the COVID-19 pandemic. The season was abandoned and was declared void on 20 January 2021.

=== Dewa United ===
In 2021, Achmad Faris signed a contract with Indonesian Liga 2 club Dewa United. He made his league debut on 28 September against RANS Cilegon at the Gelora Bung Karno Madya Stadium, Jakarta.

== International career ==
Achmad Faris called up to Indonesia under-21 team and played in 2012 Hassanal Bolkiah Trophy, but failed to win after losing 0-2 from Brunei under-21 team.

== Honours ==
=== Club ===
Sriwijaya U-21

- Indonesia Super League U-21: 2012–13

Sriwijaya

- East Kalimantan Governor Cup: 2018

Dewa United

- Liga 2 third place (play-offs): 2021

=== International ===
Indonesia U-21

- Hassanal Bolkiah Trophy runner-up: 2012
