= Goran Gančev =

Macedonian footballer

Personal information
- Full name: Goran Gančev
- Date of birth: 4 August 1983 (age 43)
- Place of birth: Negotino, Macedonia
- Height: 1.88 m (6 ft 2 in)
- Position: Defender

Team information
- Current team: Pelister (assistant coach)

Youth career
- Rabotnički

Senior career*
Years	Team	Apps	(Gls)
2002–2005	Rabotnički	17	(1)
2005–2006	Tikveš	30	(2)
2006–2007	Metalurg Skopje	28	(2)
2007–2008	Milano Kumanovo	8	(2)
2008	→ Baškimi Kumanovo (loan)	15	(1)
2008–2009	Milano Kumanovo	22	(1)
2009–2010	Pelister	33	(1)
2010–2011	Željezničar Sarajevo	12	(0)
2011	→ Velež Mostar (loan)	14	(0)
2011–2012	Inter Zaprešić	9	(0)
2012	PSMS Medan	20	(2)
2013	Persebaya 1927	32	(2)
2014	Busaiteen Club	9	(0)
2014	Pelister	10	(0)
2015	Semen Padang	14	(0)
2015	Pusamania Borneo	10	(4)
2016	Arema Cronus	40	(1)
2017	Persegres Gresik United	11	(0)
2017–2018	Akademija Pandev	17	(1)
2018	Sriwijaya	9	(0)
2019–2020	Pelister	27	(1)
Total		387	(21)

International career
	Macedonia U-21	3	(0)

Managerial career
- 2020–: Pelister (assistant coach)
- * Club domestic league appearances and goals

Goran Gančev (Macedonian: Горан Ганчев; born 4 August 1983) is a Macedonian former footballer who currently assistant coach of FK Pelister in the Macedonian First Football League.

== Career ==
=== Early career ===
Gančev began his career as a youth player for Vardar, a team from his home town of Negotino. He played for the youth selection and made his debut for the senior team at the age of 16 when the team played in the Macedonian 2nd division. At age 17, Gančev signed for the Macedonian club Rabotnicki in Skopje.

Gančev played in the U-18 team in his first season, before moving to the senior squad where he debuted as a central defender.

After three years at Rabotnicki, Gančev moved to Tikves Kavadarci for one year, and then spent the next two years in Skopje playing for Madjari and Metalurg. During this time he finished his education at the Economics faculty of the European University of Skopje.

A move to Kumanovo saw Gančev playing for six months for Baskimi.

Gančev's next move took him to Pelister, in Bitola.

=== Abroad ===
From there, Gančev received several offers to move abroad, and chose Zeljeznicar in Sarajevo, a team playing in UEFA Champions League. In his time in Bosnia and Hercegovina, he also played for six months for Velez Mostar.

In summer 2011, he signed a one-year contract for Croatian team Inter Zapresic, playing there until winter 2012.

Gančev's next destination was Indonesia, with a contract with PSMS in Medan playing in the country's Premier League, where he played in defence. Media and newspapers called him "Big Macedonian", and praised his acceleration, fighting spirit and stability on the ground. Gančev next moved to Indonesian club Persebaya in Surabaya, on a one-year contract.

Al Busaiten Bahrain

In January 2014 officially announced that Gančev sign for current Bahrain Champion FC Busaiteen until the end of the season join the team in the Bahrain Premier League and follow the GCC Gulf Champions League, where rich the 1/4 final. FC Busaiteen was part of the Bahrain King Cup Final. In the big Final Busaiten lose from East Riffa 2-1 and become runner-up.

Semen Padang

In early 2015, Semen Padang finally hook Goran Gančev to strengthen the defense wall. Players from Macedonia that completes the quota of three foreign players are allowed to compete in the Indonesian Super League in 2015. Goran's debut for the team was on away against Indonesian Last Champion Persib Bandung.

Pusamania Borneo FC

The Official League of Indonesia which was Temporary Terminated and was Imposed Sanction on Indonesia Football Federation by FIFA made Goran join Squad of Pusamania Borneo FC where following The Tournament Sudirman CUP.Goran and PBFC reaching Semi-Final.

Arema Cronus

February 2016, Goran Gančev certainly become the third foreign player Arema Cronus in the preparation ahead of the Indonesian Super Competition ISC 2016. Players from Macedonia was officially signed a contract with the club in a shield bearing the lion's head. Goran Gančev had previously participated in the inaugural match Arema defended Cup Group A governor of East Kalimantan (Kaltim) in 2016 against Gresik United, Saturday, 27 February 2016. It became his debut, in which Arema won 3–1. Arema and Goran become Champion of the preseason Cup, winning against last Indonesian Super League Champion Persib in the big Final in Jakarta with result 2–0. Goran live debut with Arema Cronus in Indonesia Soccer Championship ISC 2016 was against Persiba Balikpapan at home stadion winning the game 2–0.

Goran always believed to be the starting line-up for Arema and were able to manage the team top Defence in the League.The Statistic said from 18 games Arema conceded only 5 goals and 15 cleen sheets.

Back to FK Pelister

Gančev re-joined FK Pelister in January 2019, after signing a 18-month long contract.
