= Hambali Tolib =

Indonesian footballer

Personal information
- Full name: Muhammad Hambali Tolib
- Date of birth: 20 June 2000 (age 26)
- Place of birth: Makassar, Indonesia
- Height: 1.66 m (5 ft 5 in)
- Position: Midfielder

Team information
- Current team: Persela Lamongan
- Number: 14

Youth career
- SKO Ragunan
- 2017: Sriwijaya

Senior career*
Years	Team	Apps	(Gls)
2018	Sriwijaya	6	(0)
2019	Persela Lamongan	12	(1)
2020–2022	Persebaya Surabaya	10	(0)
2022–2023	PSS Sleman	0	(0)
2022–2023	→ Borneo Samarinda (loan)	4	(0)
2023–2024	Bekasi City	16	(2)
2024–2025	PSKC Cimahi	18	(2)
2025–	Persela Lamongan	26	(4)

International career
2019	Indonesia U23	3	(0)
- * Club domestic league appearances and goals as of 27 September 2026

Muhammad Hambali Tolib (born 20 June 2000) is an Indonesian professional footballer who plays as a midfielder for Liga 2 club Persela Lamongan.

== Club career ==
=== Sriwijaya F.C. ===
In 2018, Hambali signed a year contract with Sriwijaya. He made 6 matches without scoring, when Sriwijaya played in the Liga 1.

=== Persela Lamongan ===
In 2019, Hambali signed a year contract with Persela Lamongan. He made his debut on 17 May 2019 in a match against Madura United. On 27 May 2019, Hambali scored his first goal for Persela against Arema in the 26th minute at the Kanjuruhan Stadium, Malang.

=== Persebaya Surabaya ===
He was signed for Persebaya Surabaya to play in Liga 1 in the 2020 season. He made his league debut for Persebaya on 29 February 2020 in a draw 1–1 against Persik Kediri. And a month later, This season was suspended on 27 March 2020 due to the COVID-19 pandemic. The season was abandoned and was declared void on 20 January 2021.

=== PSS Sleman ===
Hambali was signed for PSS Sleman to play in Liga 1 in the 2022–23 season.

==== Borneo Samarinda (loan) ====
He was signed for Boneo Samarinda to play in Liga 1 in the 2022 season, on loan from PSS Sleman. Hambali made his league debut on 30 July 2022 in a match against Barito Putera at the Demang Lehman Stadium, Martapura.

== International career ==
He made his international debut for Indonesia U-23 on 7 June 2019 against Thailand U-23 and Philippines U-23 on 9 June 2019 at 2019 Merlion Cup.

== Career statistics ==
=== Club ===
As of match played 27 September 2026

Club	Season	League			Cup (Note: Includes Piala Indonesia)		Continental		Other (Note: Appearances in Indonesia President's Cup)		Total	
Club	Season	Division	Apps	Goals	Apps	Goals	Apps	Goals	Apps	Goals	Apps	Goals
Sriwijaya	2018	Liga 1	6	0	0	0	0	0	0	0	6	0
Persela Lamongan	2019	Liga 1	12	1	4	1	0	0	4	0	20	2
Persebaya Surabaya	2020	Liga 1	1	0	0	0	0	0	0	0	1	0
Persebaya Surabaya	2021–22	Liga 1	9	0	0	0	0	0	3 (Note: Appearances in Menpora Cup)	0	12	0
Persebaya Surabaya	Total		10	0	0	0	0	0	3	0	13	0
PSS Sleman	2022–23	Liga 1	0	0	0	0	0	0	6	0	6	0
Borneo Samarinda (loan)	2022–23	Liga 1	4	0	0	0	0	0	0	0	4	0
Bekasi City	2023–24	Liga 2	16	2	0	0	–		0	0	16	2
PSKC Cimahi	2024–25	Liga 2	18	2	0	0	–		0	0	18	2
Persela Lamongan	2025–26	Championship	23	3	0	0	–		0	0	23	3
Persela Lamongan	2026–27	Championship	3	1	0	0	–		0	0	3	1
Career total			92	9	4	1	0	0	13	0	109	10

== Honours ==
=== Club ===
Persebaya Surabaya

- East Java Governor Cup: 2020
