= Ichsan Kurniawan =

Indonesian footballer

Personal information
- Full name: Ichsan Kurniawan
- Date of birth: 24 December 1995 (age 30)
- Place of birth: East Ogan Komering Ulu, Indonesia
- Height: 1.71 m (5 ft 7 in)
- Position: Midfielder

Team information
- Current team: PSGC Ciamis
- Number: 24

Youth career
- 2011–2014: Sriwijaya

Senior career*
Years	Team	Apps	(Gls)
2013–2018	Sriwijaya	48	(2)
2019	Borneo	6	(0)
2020	Muba Babel United	0	(0)
2021	PSG Pati	10	(0)
2022	Persija Jakarta	12	(0)
2022–2024	Dewa United	31	(1)
2023–2024	→ Persita Tangerang (loan)	12	(0)
2024–2025	PSKC Cimahi	20	(2)
2025–2026	Sumsel United	16	(0)
2026–	PSGC Ciamis	0	(0)

International career^{‡}
2013–2014	Indonesia U19	7	(0)
2016	Indonesia	1	(0)
- * Club domestic league appearances and goals as of 22:45, 18 April 2026 (UTC) ‡ National team caps and goals as of 22:45, 6 September 2016 (UTC)

Ichsan Kurniawan (born 24 December 1995) is an Indonesian professional footballer who plays as a midfielder for Championship club PSGC Ciamis.

== Club career ==
He made his Sriwijaya first-team debut on 18 September 2013 as starting line-up, which ended 6–1 defeat against Barito Putera at Demang Lehman Stadium.

== International career ==
In 2014, Ichsan represented the Indonesia U-19, in the 2014 AFC U-19 Championship. He made his debut with Indonesia on 6 September 2016 in a friendly against Malaysia as a substitute.

== Personal life ==
He is a graduate of Yogyakarta State University (UNY), the Faculty of Sports Science with a concentration in sports coaching education.

== Career statistics ==
=== Club ===
As of 18 April 2026

Club	Season	League			Cup (Note: Includes Piala Indonesia)		Other (Note: Appearances in Indonesia President's Cup)		Total	
Club	Season	Division	Apps	Goals	Apps	Goals	Apps	Goals	Apps	Goals
Sriwijaya	2013	Indonesia Super League	1	0	—				1	0
Sriwijaya	2014	Indonesia Super League	0	0	—				0	0
Sriwijaya	2015	Indonesia Super League	2	0	—				2	0
Sriwijaya	2016	ISC A	18	2	—				18	2
Sriwijaya	2017	Liga 1	24	0	—				24	0
Sriwijaya	2018	Liga 1	3	0	—		4	0	7	0
Sriwijaya	Total		48	2	—		4	0	52	2
Borneo	2019	Liga 1	6	0	—				6	0
Muba Babel United	2020	Liga 2	0	0	—				0	0
Muba Babel United	2021	Liga 2	0	0	—				0	0
PSG Pati	2021	Liga 2	10	0	—				10	0
Persija Jakarta	2021–22	Liga 1	12	0	—				12	0
Dewa United	2022–23	Liga 1	24	1	—				24	1
Dewa United	2023–24	Liga 1	7	0	—				7	0
Persita Tangerang (loan)	2023–24	Liga 1	12	0	—				12	0
PSKC Cimahi	2024–25	Liga 2	20	2	—				20	2
Sumsel United	2025–26	Championship	16	0	—				16	0
Career total			154	5	—		4	0	158	5

=== International ===
As of match played 11 June 2016

Appearances and goals by national team and year
National team	Year	Apps	Goals
Indonesia	2016	1	0
Total		1	0

== Honours ==
=== Club ===
Sriwijaya U-21

- Indonesia Super League U-21: 2012–13

Sriwijaya

- East Kalimantan Governor Cup: 2018
