= Jeki Arisandi =

Indonesian footballer

Personal information
- Full name: Jeki Arisandi
- Date of birth: 30 November 1990 (age 35)
- Place of birth: Palembang, Indonesia
- Height: 1.73 m (5 ft 8 in)
- Position: Left-back

Youth career
- 2008–2011: Sriwijaya U21

Senior career*
Years	Team	Apps	(Gls)
2010–2012	Sriwijaya	0	(0)
2012–2013	PS Bangka	18	(0)
2013	Persis Solo	11	(0)
2014–2015	Sriwijaya	19	(0)
2016–2017	Madura United	6	(0)
2017	Persegres Gresik United	14	(0)
2017–2018	PS Barito Putera	7	(0)
2018–2019	Sriwijaya	6	(0)
2019	Persita Tangerang	11	(0)
2020	Muba Babel United	0	(0)
2021	PSG Pati	4	(0)
2022	Putra Delta Sidoarjo	2	(0)
- * Club domestic league appearances and goals as of 11 September 2022

Jeki Arisandi (born 30 November 1990, in Palembang) is an Indonesian former footballer who plays as a left-back.

== Club career ==
Jeki made his debut for Sriwijaya FC in the 2011 AFC Cup against Maldives club, VB Addu FC on 1 March 2011 as a reserve player.

He had played for PS Bangka and Persis Solo in the 2013 season before eventually returning to play for Sriwijaya FC

=== Madura United ===
Jeki joined to Madura United in 2016 Indonesia Soccer Championship A. He played 11 minutes against Pusamania Borneo

=== Persegres Gresik United ===
In 2017 season, Jeki joined to Persegres Gresik United for 2017 Piala Presiden and 2017 Liga 1.

== Honours ==
=== Club ===
Persita Tangerang

- Liga 2 runner-up: 2019
