= Morimakan Koïta =

Malian footballer

Personal information
- Date of birth: 25 December 1990 (age 35)
- Place of birth: Bamako, Mali
- Height: 1.75 m (5 ft 9 in)
- Position: Midfielder

Team information
- Current team: Sriwijaya FC

Senior career*
Years	Team	Apps	(Gls)
2008–2014	Stade Malien	154	(54)
2014–2015	Sriwijaya FC	1	(0)
2015-2016	Arema	0	(0)
2016–2021	USC Kita	37	(5)

International career^{‡}
2014–	Mali	6	(2)
- * Club domestic league appearances and goals as of 21:05, 11 April 2015 (UTC) ‡ National team caps and goals as of 13 December 2014

Morimakan Koïta is a Malian professional footballer, who plays as a midfielder.

== Club career ==
On November 23, 2014, it was reported that he already signed with Indonesian-side Sriwijaya FC.

== International career ==
In January 2014, coach Djibril Dramé, invited him to be a part of the Mali squad for the 2014 African Nations Championship. He helped the team to the quarter-finals where they lost to Zimbabwe by two goals to one.

== Honours ==
- 2003-2004 : Finalist U-15 Championship of Mali
- 2012-2013 : Finalist U-16 Championship of Mali
- 2013 : Finalist U-23 Championship of Mali
- Champion of Mali 2012 with Stade Mali
- Champion of Mali 2013 with Stade Mali
- Champion of Mali 2014 with Stade Mali
