= Rangga Pratama =

Indonesian footballer

Personal information
- Full name: Rangga Pratama
- Date of birth: 18 April 1996 (age 30)
- Place of birth: Palembang, Indonesia
- Height: 1.75 m (5 ft 9 in)
- Position: Goalkeeper

Team information
- Current team: Persiku Kudus
- Number: 51

Youth career
- 2013–2015: Sriwijaya
- 2016: Barito Putera

Senior career*
Years	Team	Apps	(Gls)
2016–2017	Persikabo Bogor	18	(0)
2017–2018	Sriwijaya	0	(0)
2019–2020	PSMS Medan	10	(0)
2021–2022	PSCS Cilacap	2	(0)
2023–2025	Persewar Waropen	9	(0)
2025–2026	Sriwijaya	12	(0)
2026–	Persiku Kudus	1	(0)

International career
2014	Indonesia U19	1	(0)
- * Club domestic league appearances and goals as of 20 September 2026

Rangga Pratama (born 18 April 1996) is an Indonesian professional footballer who plays as a goalkeeper for Championship club Persiku Kudus.

== Club career ==
=== PSCS Cilacap ===
He was signed for PSCS Cilacap to play in Liga 2 in 2021–22 season. Rangga made his league debut on 15 November 2021 in a match against Hizbul Wathan at the Manahan Stadium, Surakarta.

=== Persewar Waropen ===
He was signed for Persewar Waropen to play in Liga 2 in 2023–24 season. Rangga made his league debut on 12 October 2023 in a 2–1 win against Persipura Jayapura.
