= Novan Sasongko =

Indonesian footballer

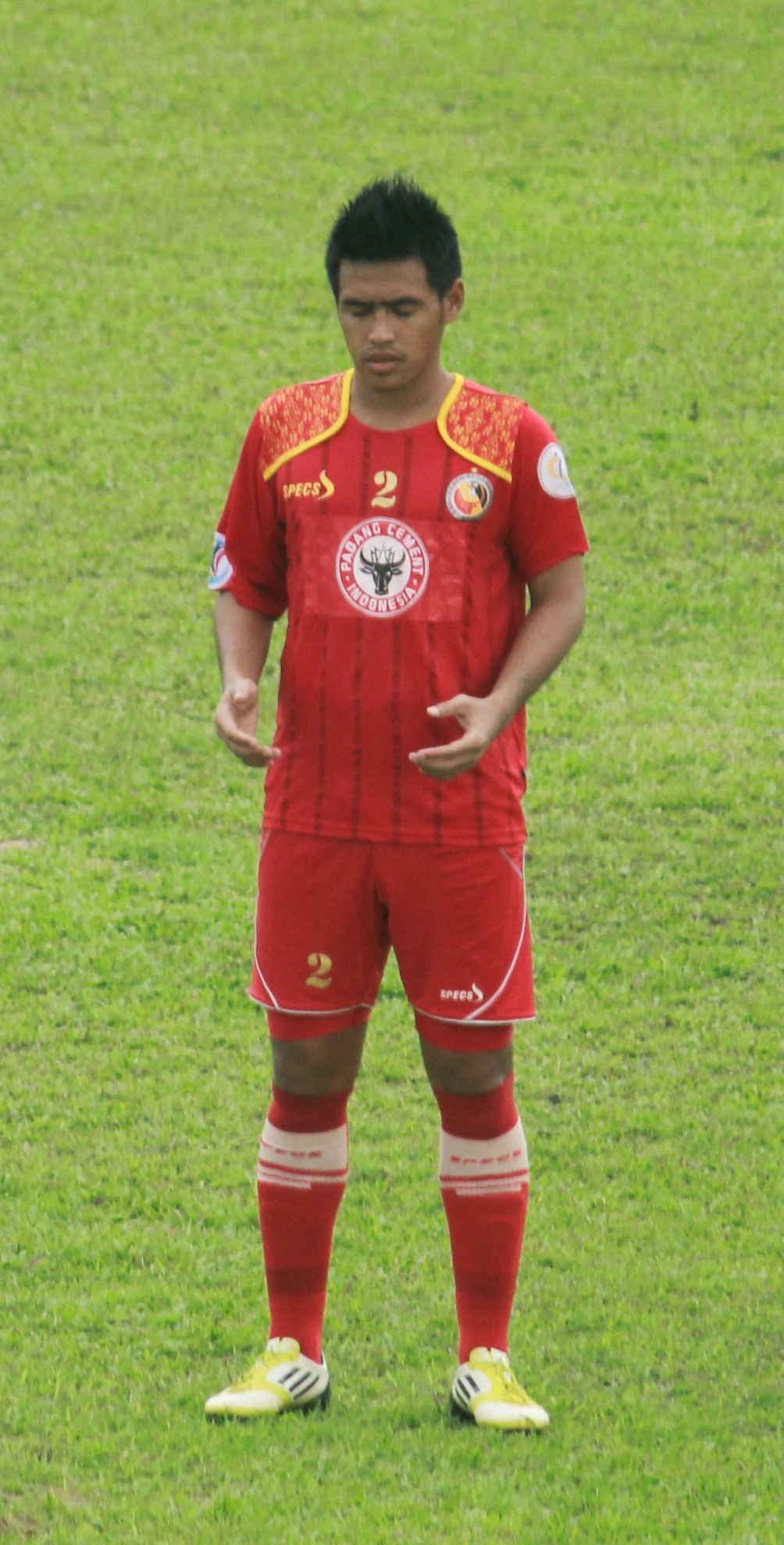
- Sasongko playing for Semen Padang in 2013

Personal information
- Full name: Novan Setya Sasongko
- Date of birth: 26 November 1989 (age 36)
- Place of birth: Bojonegoro, Indonesia
- Height: 1.70 m (5 ft 7 in)
- Position: Full-back

Team information
- Current team: Persis Solo
- Number: 2

Youth career
- 2005–2008: Persibo Bojonegoro

Senior career*
Years	Team	Apps	(Gls)
2008–2012	Persibo Bojonegoro	39	(0)
2012–2018	Semen Padang	86	(0)
2018	Sriwijaya	8	(0)
2018	Bali United	3	(0)
2019	Persebaya Surabaya	15	(0)
2020–2021	Persela Lamongan	2	(0)
2021–2024	Madura United	76	(0)
2024–2026	Barito Putera	23	(0)
2025–2026	→ Madura United (loan)	21	(0)
2026–	Persis Solo	1	(0)

International career
2008	Indonesia U21		
2012–2014	Indonesia	12	(0)
- * Club domestic league appearances and goals as of 22:45, 13 September 2026 (UTC)

Novan Setya Sasongko (born 26 November 1989) is an Indonesian professional footballer who plays as a full-back for Championship club Persis Solo.

== Club career ==
He started his career in Persibo Bojonegoro since 2008. He played as a substitute in the 2009–10 Liga Indonesia Premier Division final, where Persibo beat Delta Putra Sidoarjo 3–1 on penalties following a 0–0 draw.

== International career ==
His international debut was an away friendly match against Philippines on June 5, 2012.

== Honours ==
=== Club ===
Persibo Bojonegoro

- Liga Indonesia Premier Division: 2009–10
- Piala Indonesia: 2012

Semen Padang

- Indonesian Community Shield: 2013

Sriwijaya

- East Kalimantan Governor Cup: 2018

Persebaya Surabaya

- Liga 1 runner-up: 2019
- Indonesia President's Cup runner-up: 2019
