= Haris Tuharea =

Indonesian association football player

Personal information
- Full name: Haris Tuharea
- Date of birth: 22 November 1994 (age 31)
- Place of birth: Ambon, Indonesia
- Height: 1.72 m (5 ft 8 in)
- Position: Left winger

Youth career
- 2011–2012: Deportivo Indonesia
- 2013: Yahukimo

Senior career*
Years	Team	Apps	(Gls)
2014	PSBS Biak	8	(0)
2015	PSMS Medan	0	(0)
2016–2017	Perssu Sumenep	12	(8)
2017–2018	PS Mojokerto Putra	32	(13)
2019	PSS Sleman	23	(6)
2020–2022	Madura United	21	(2)
2023–2024	PSS Sleman	16	(1)
2024–2025	PSKC Cimahi	8	(0)

International career
2011	Indonesia U19	1	(0)
- * Club domestic league appearances and goals as of 27 January 2025

Haris Tuharea (born 22 November 1994) is an Indonesian professional footballer who plays as a left winger.

== Club career ==
=== PS Mojokerto Putra ===
In 2017, Tuharea signed a year contract with PS Mojokerto Putra. Tuharea scored 10 goals in the 2018 season, when PSMP played in the second division.

=== PSS Sleman ===
On 28 January 2019, Tuharea signed a year contract with PSS Sleman along other players, Derry Rachman, Ricky Kambuaya, and Jajang Sukmara. He made his league debut on 15 May 2019 in a match against Arema, he also give assists an opening goal by Brian Ferreira. On 7 July 2019, Tuharea scored his first goal for PSS with scored a brace against Kalteng Putra at the Maguwoharjo Stadium, Sleman. Six days later, he scored the winning goal in a 2–1 win over Persebaya Surabaya. On 29 September, Tuharea scored equalizer in a 2–2 draw over Madura United. During the 2019 season, he made 23 league appearances, scored 6 goals and give 3 assists for PSS Sleman.

=== Madura United ===
He was signed for Madura United to play in the Liga 1 in the 2020 season. Tuharea made his league debut on 29 February 2020 in a match against Barito Putera at the Gelora Ratu Pamelingan Stadium, Pamekasan. This season was suspended on 27 March 2020 due to the COVID-19 pandemic. The season was abandoned and was declared void on 20 January 2021.

On 28 November 2021, Tuharea scored his first goal for Madura United in a 0–3 victory over Barito Putera at the Maguwoharjo Stadium. On 9 December, Tuharea scored the winning goal in the 71st minute in a 0–1 win against Bali United at the Sultan Agung Stadium. Five days later, Tuharea give his first assists for the club to Slamet Nurcahyono in Madura United's 2–2 draw over Borneo Samarinda at Manahan Stadium.

On 30 July 2022, he started his match in the 2022–23 Liga 1 season for Madura United in a 1–3 win over Persib Bandung, coming as a substituted Lulinha before match ended. He made 21 appearances, scoring two goals during his three years with Madura United.

=== Return to PSS Sleman ===
On 19 January 2023, Tuharea decided to sign a contract with his former club since 2019, PSS Sleman. He made his league debut in a 2–0 win against RANS Nusantara two days later as a substitute in the 69th minute. Tuharea give assists an opening goal by Yevhen Bokhashvili in PSS's 2–1 away win over PS Barito Putera on 31 January. He scored his first goal for the side on 13 February in a 4–2 lose with Persebaya Surabaya.
