= Rizky Ramadhana =

Indonesian footballer

Personal information
- Full name: Rizky Dwi Ramadhana
- Date of birth: 7 March 1992 (age 34)
- Place of birth: Palembang, Indonesia
- Height: 1.73 m (5 ft 8 in)
- Position: Defender

Youth career
- 2005–2013: Sriwijaya

Senior career*
Years	Team	Apps	(Gls)
2011–2019	Sriwijaya	70	(3)
2020	Muba Babel United	0	(0)
2021–2022	PS Palembang	6	(4)
2023	Sriwijaya	3	(0)

International career
2014	Indonesia U23	1	(0)
- * Club domestic league appearances and goals as of 01:24 6 January 2024 (UTC)

Rizky Dwi Ramadhana (born March 7, 1992, in Palembang, South Sumatra) is an Indonesian professional footballer who plays as a defender.

== Club career ==
=== Sriwijaya FC ===
Ramadhana made his debut for Sriwijaya on July 5, 2012, in a 2–1 win over Pelita Bandung Raya, replacing Muhammad Ridwan in the second minute of stoppage time.

Ramadhana scored his first league goal for the Elang Andalas on September 5, 2014, in the last regular match day of the 2014 Indonesia Super League season in a 3–2 loss to Persib Bandung.

=== Muba Babel United ===
He was signed for Muba Babel United to play in Liga 2 in the 2020 season. This season was suspended on 27 March 2020 due to the COVID-19 pandemic. The season was abandoned and was declared void on 20 January 2021.

== Career statistics ==
=== Club ===
As of 6 January 2024.

Club statistics
Club	Season	League			National Cup (Note: Includes Piala Indonesia.)		Continental		Other		Total	
Club	Season	Division	Apps	Goals	Apps	Goals	Apps	Goals	Apps	Goals	Apps	Goals
Sriwijaya	2011–12	Indonesia Super League	1	0	—		—		—		1	0
Sriwijaya	2013	Indonesia Super League	3	0	—		—		—		3	0
Sriwijaya	2014	Indonesia Super League	15	1	—		—		—		15	1
Sriwijaya	2015	Indonesia Super League	0	0	0	0	—		—		0	0
Sriwijaya	2016	Indonesia Soccer Championship A	9	0	0	0	—		—		9	0
Sriwijaya	2017	Liga 1	12	1	0	0	—		—		12	1
Sriwijaya	2018	Liga 1	11	1	2	1	—		—		13	2
Sriwijaya	2019	Liga 2	19	0	1	1	—		—		20	1
Sriwijaya	Total		70	3	3	2	—		—		73	5
Muba Babel United	2020	Liga 2	0	0	0	0	—		—		0	0
Muba Babel United	2021	Liga 2	0	0	0	0	—		—		0	0
Muba Babel United	Total		0	0	0	0	—		—		0	0
PS Palembang	2021	Liga 3	6	4	0	0	—		—		6	4
Sriwijaya	2023–24	Liga 2	3	0	0	0	—		—		3	0
Career total			79	7	3	2	0	0	0	0	82	9

== Honours ==
=== Club ===
Sriwijaya

- Indonesian Super League: 2011–12

Sriwijaya U-21

- Indonesia Super League U-21: 2012–13

=== Individual ===
- Indonesia Super League U-21 Best Player: 2012–13
- Indonesia Super League U-21 Top Goalscorer: 2012–13 (9 goals)
