= Saepuloh Maulana =

Indonesian footballer

Personal information
- Full name: Saepuloh Maulana
- Date of birth: 22 December 1988 (age 37)
- Place of birth: Bogor, Indonesia
- Height: 1.75 m (5 ft 9 in)
- Position: Defender

Youth career
- SSB Prahara

Senior career*
Years	Team	Apps	(Gls)
2005–2006	Persikoban Kota Banjar		
2006–2011	Persikabo Bogor	58	(0)
2011–2015	Semen Padang	46	(1)
2015	→ Mitra Kukar (loan)	11	(0)
2016–2017	Mitra Kukar	51	(1)
2018	Sriwijaya	0	(0)
2018–2019	Mitra Kukar	20	(1)
2019	Persib Bandung	2	(0)
2019–2020	Badak Lampung	15	(0)
2021	Muba Babel United	0	(0)
2021	Mitra Kukar	10	(1)
2022–2023	Persikabo 1973	2	(0)
2023–2024	Kalteng Putra	9	(0)
2024	ASIOP		
- * Club domestic league appearances and goals as of 3 February 2024

Saepuloh Maulana (born 22 December 1988) is an Indonesian professional footballer who plays as a defender. He previously plays for Mitra Kukar and He appeared for Semen Padang in the 2013 AFC Cup.

== Honours ==
=== Club ===
Semen Padang

- Indonesia Premier League: 2011-12
- Indonesian Community Shield: 2013
