= Gilang Ginarsa =

Indonesian footballer

Personal information
- Full name: Gilang Ginarsa
- Date of birth: 14 May 1988 (age 38)
- Place of birth: Jakarta, Indonesia
- Height: 1.74 m (5 ft 9 in)
- Position: Right-back

Team information
- Current team: Persikabo 1973 (Manager)

Youth career
- 2008–2009: Pelita Jaya U-21

Senior career*
Years	Team	Apps	(Gls)
2007	PPSM Magelang	0	(0)
2008–2009	Pelita Jaya	0	(0)
2009–2012	Persepam Madura Utama	12	(0)
2013–2015	Arema	4	(0)
2016	Madura United	26	(0)
2017	Sriwijaya	16	(0)
2018	PSIS Semarang	25	(0)
2019	Mitra Kukar	7	(0)
2020–2021	Semen Padang	1	(0)
2021–2023	Persikabo 1973	51	(0)
- * Club domestic league appearances and goals as of 31 March 2023

Gilang Ginarsa (born 14 May 1988 in Jakarta) is an Indonesian former footballer who plays as a right-back .

== Hounors ==
=== Clubs ===
Pelita Jaya U-21

- Indonesia Super League U-21: 2008-09

Arema F.C.

- Menpora Cup: 2013
- Indonesian Inter Island Cup: 2014/15
