= Nur Iskandar =

Indonesian footballer (born 1986)

Personal information
- Full name: Muhammad Nur Iskandar
- Date of birth: 7 December 1986 (age 39)
- Place of birth: Jayapura, Indonesia
- Height: 1.69 m (5 ft 7 in)
- Position: Attacking midfielder

Team information
- Current team: Semen Padang (assistant coach)

Youth career
- 2004–2006: Persipura Jayapura
- 2006–2008: PON Papua

Senior career*
Years	Team	Apps	(Gls)
2009–2010	Persias Asmat	15	(4)
2010–2011	Persitara	12	(5)
2011	Batavia Union	10	(4)
2011–2012	Persibo Bojonegoro	20	(12)
2013–2016	Semen Padang	66	(17)
2017–2019	Sriwijaya	54	(3)
2019	Bhayangkara	19	(0)
2020	Semen Padang	1	(0)
2021	Sriwijaya	12	(2)
2022	Persela Lamongan	9	(0)
2022–2024	Sriwijaya	16	(0)
Total		234	(47)

International career
2012–2014	Indonesia	5	(0)

Managerial career
- 2026–: Semen Padang (assistant coach)
- * Club domestic league appearances and goals

Muhammad Nur Iskandar (born 7 December 1986 in Jayapura) is an Indonesian professional football Manager (association football) and former player who is an assistant coach of Semen Padang. He played as an attacking midfielder for various Indonesian clubs, most recently Liga 2 club Sriwijaya. Iskandar earned five caps for the Indonesia national team from 2012 to 2014.

== International career ==
Iskandar received his first senior international cap against North Korea on September 10, 2012.

Indonesia's goal tally first.

International appearances and goals
#	Date	Venue	Opponent	Result	Competition	Goal
2012
1	10 September	Gelora Bung Karno Stadium, Jakarta, Indonesia	North Korea	0–2	SCTV Cup	
2	15 September	Gelora Bung Tomo Stadium, Surabaya, Indonesia	Vietnam	0–0	Friendly match	
3	26 September	Hassanal Bolkiah National Stadium, Bandar Seri Begawan, Brunei	Brunei	5–0	Friendly match	
2014
4	9 September	Maguwoharjo Stadium, Sleman, Indonesia	Yemen	0–0	Friendly match	
5	25 September	Gelora Delta Stadium, Sidoarjo, Indonesia	Cambodia	1–0	Friendly match	

== Honours ==
=== Club ===
Persibo Bojonegoro

- Piala Indonesia: 2012

Semen Padang

- Indonesian Community Shield: 2013

Sriwijaya

- East Kalimantan Governor Cup: 2018

=== Individual ===
- Indonesia Soccer Championship A Top Assists: 2016
