= Manda Cingi =

Indonesian footballer

Personal information
- Full name: Manda Cingi
- Date of birth: 29 May 1993 (age 33)
- Place of birth: Bandar Lampung, Indonesia
- Height: 1.70 m (5 ft 7 in)
- Position: Defensive midfielder

Team information
- Current team: Deltras
- Number: 6

Youth career
- SSB Tunas Saburai
- SSB Pahoman United
- 2014–2015: Sriwijaya

Senior career*
Years	Team	Apps	(Gls)
2011–2012	Persatu Tuban		
2012–2013	PPSM Magelang	15	(0)
2013	PSBL Bandar Lampung	8	(0)
2014–2018	Sriwijaya	25	(0)
2017–2018	→ Semen Padang (loan)	26	(6)
2019	Semen Padang	25	(0)
2020	Badak Lampung	1	(0)
2021	Semen Padang	9	(0)
2022	PSM Makassar	9	(0)
2022–2023	PSS Sleman	13	(0)
2023–2024	Kalteng Putra	14	(0)
2024	Sriwijaya	13	(0)
2025	PSKC Cimahi	6	(0)
2025–2026	Garudayaksa	17	(0)
2026–	Deltras	0	(0)
- * Club domestic league appearances and goals as of 9 May 2026

Manda Cingi (born 29 May 1993) is an Indonesian professional footballer who plays as a defensive midfielder for Championship club Deltras.

== Honours ==
Semen Padang

- Liga 2 runner-up: 2018

Garudayaksa

- Championship: 2025–26
