= Muba Babel United F.C. =

Indonesian football club non-active

Muba Babel United
- Full name: Muba Babel United Football Club
- Nicknames: Ranggonang Warrior; The Andalas Wild Bear
- Short name: MBUTD
- Founded: March 2020; 6 years ago
- Dissolved: 22 July 2022; 4 years ago
- Ground: Serasan Sekate Stadium
- Capacity: 5,000
- 2021: Liga 2/1st round (Group A), 5th
Home colours	Away colours

Muba Babel United Football Club (formerly known as Babel United) was an Indonesian football club based in Musi Banyuasin Regency, South Sumatra. In June 2022, Muba Babel United were acquired by Liga 3 side Persipal Palu. As a result, Muba Babel United ceased to exist as Persipal's senior team took over their spot in the 2022-23 Liga 2 season.

== History ==
In March 2020, Babel United and Muba United merged to form Muba Babel United. In June 2022, Muba Babel United was acquired by Liga 3 side Persipal Palu. As a result, Muba Babel United ceased to exist as Persipal's senior team took over their spot in the 2022–23 Liga 2 season.
