= 2022–23 Arema F.C. season =

Arema F.C.
2022–23 season
- President: Gilang Widya Pramana (until 29 October 2022); Iwan Budianto (from 29 October 2022)
- Head coach: Eduardo Almeida (until 5 September 2022); Javier Roca (from 6 September 2022 to 6 February 2023); Putu Gede Suwi Santoso (caretaker, from 7 February to 9 March 2023); Joko Susilo (from 9 March 2023)
- Stadium: Kanjuruhan Stadium (until 1 October 2022); PTIK Stadium (from 4 February 2023); Patriot Chandrabhaga Stadium (only 18 February 2023)
- Liga 1: 12th
- Piala Indonesia: Cancelled
- Top goalscorer: Dedik Setiawan (9)
- Highest home attendance: 42,588 (vs. Persebaya, 1 October 2022)
- Lowest home attendance: 3,077 (vs. RANS Nusantara, 24 August 2022) (Matches played behind closed doors are not included)
- Average home league attendance: 7,763
Home colours	Away colours	Third colours

The 2022–23 Arema F.C. season is Arema's 33rd competitive season. The club will compete in Indonesia League 1. Arema Football Club a professional football club based in Malang, East Java, Indonesia.

== Squad information ==
=== First team squad ===
Note: Flags indicate national team as defined under FIFA eligibility rules; some limited exceptions apply. Players may hold more than one non-FIFA nationality.

No.	Pos.	Nation	Player
2	DF	IDN	Joko Susilo
3	DF	IDN	Bayu Aji
4	DF	POR	Sérgio Silva
5	DF	IDN	Bagas Adi
6	MF	IDN	Evan Dimas
7	MF	IDN	Iman Budi Hernandi
8	MF	JPN	Renshi Yamaguchi
10	FW	IDN	Muhammad Rafli
11	MF	IDN	Gian Zola
12	DF	IDN	Rizky Dwi Febrianto
13	FW	IDN	Hamzah Titofani
14	MF	IDN	Jayus Hariono
18	MF	IDN	Kevin Armedyah
19	MF	IDN	Ahmad Bustomi
20	GK	IDN	Galih Firmansyah

No.	Pos.	Nation	Player
21	MF	IDN	Arkhan Fikri
23	GK	IDN	Teguh Amiruddin
24	DF	IDN	Andik Rendika Rama
26	DF	IDN	Achmad Figo
27	FW	IDN	Dedik Setiawan
28	MF	IDN	Seiya Da Costa Lay
29	FW	GBS	Abel Camará
30	FW	IDN	Ilham Armaiyn
33	GK	IDN	Andriyas Francisco
37	DF	IDN	Ikhfanul Alam
41	FW	IDN	Dendi Santoso (vice-captain)
44	DF	IDN	Syaeful Anwar
87	DF	IDN	Johan Alfarizi (captain)
90	GK	BRA	Adilson Maringá
99	FW	IDN	Kushedya Hari Yudo

== Transfers ==
=== In ===
No.	Pos	Player	Transferred From	Fee	Date	Source
6	MF	(Indonesia) Evan Dimas	(Indonesia) Bhayangkara	Free	5 April 2022	
11	MF	(Indonesia) Gian Zola	(Indonesia) Persib	Free	5 April 2022	
18	MF	(Indonesia) Adam Alis	(Indonesia) Bhayangkara	Free	5 April 2022	
24	DF	(Indonesia) Andik Rendika Rama	(Indonesia) Madura United	Free	5 April 2022	
15	DF	(Indonesia) Hasyim Kipuw	(Indonesia) PSM	Free	11 April 2022	
22	FW	(Indonesia) Hanis Sagara	(Indonesia) Persikabo 1973	Free	11 April 2022	
30	FW	(Indonesia) Ilham Armaiyn	(Indonesia) PSM	Free	11 April 2022	
44	DF	(Indonesia) Syaeful Anwar	(Indonesia) Persita	Free	27 April 2022	
88	FW	(Indonesia) Irsyad Maulana	(Indonesia) Persita	Free	27 April 2022	
21	MF	(Indonesia) Arkhan Fikri	(Indonesia) Kwarta Deli Serdang	Free	15 June 2022	
29	FW	(Guinea-Bissau) Abel Camará	(Portugal) Belenenses SAD	Free	1 July 2022	
3	DF	(Indonesia) Bayu Aji	(Indonesia) NZR Sumbersari	Free	21 January 2023	
7	MF	(Indonesia) Iman Budi Hernandi	(Indonesia) PSMS	Free	21 January 2023	
18	MF	(Indonesia) Kevin Armedyah	(Indonesia) PSMS	Free	21 January 2023	
20	GK	(Indonesia) Galih Firmansyah	Free agent	Free	21 January 2023	
2	DF	(Indonesia) Joko Susilo	Free agent	Free	26 January 2023	
19	MF	(Indonesia) Ahmad Bustomi	(Indonesia) PSMS	Free	26 January 2023	

=== Out ===
No.	Pos	Player	Transferred To	Fee	Date	Source
9	FW	(Portugal) Carlos Fortes	(Indonesia) PSIS	Free	1 April 2022	
19	MF	(Indonesia) Hanif Sjahbandi	(Indonesia) Persija	Free	2 April 2022	
24	DF	(Indonesia) Diego Michiels	(Indonesia) Borneo	Free	2 April 2022	
96	GK	(Indonesia) Kartika Ajie	(Indonesia) Persik	Free	8 April 2022	
—	FW	(Indonesia) Feby Eka Putra	(Indonesia) Dewa United	Free	8 April 2022	
7	FW	(Indonesia) Ryan Kurnia	(Indonesia) Persikabo 1973	Free	12 April 2022	
16	FW	(Indonesia) Ridwan Tawainella	(Indonesia) Bekasi City	Free	12 April 2022	
20	DF	(Indonesia) Achmad Galih	Free agent	Free	12 April 2022	
21	DF	(Indonesia) Aji Saka	(Indonesia) Persela	Free	12 April 2022	
33	DF	(Indonesia) Didik Ariyanto	(Indonesia) PSMS	Free	12 April 2022	
88	MF	(Indonesia) Vikrian Akbar	(Indonesia) PSKC	Free	12 April 2022	
15	DF	(Indonesia) Hasyim Kipuw	(Indonesia) Madura United	Undisclosed	8 January 2023	
22	FW	(Indonesia) Hanis Sagara	(Indonesia) Persita	Free	15 January 2023	
88	FW	(Indonesia) Irsyad Maulana	(Indonesia) Persita	Free	15 January 2023	
18	MF	(Indonesia) Adam Alis	(Indonesia) Borneo Samarinda	Undisclosed	25 January 2023	

=== Loan Out ===
No.	Pos	Player	Loaned To	Start	End	Source
16	MF	(Indonesia) Muhammad Faiz	(Indonesia) Deltras	2 August 2022	1 April 2023	
17	FW	(Indonesia) Bramntio Ramadhan	(Indonesia) Deltras	2 August 2022	1 April 2023	

== Review and events ==
This season will be the second season for the coach Eduardo Almeida and his contract extended for two years. Last season under the led of Almeida, Arema finished in the 4th and experienced unbeaten for 23 matches.

The first official training held on 10 May 2022 at Brawijaya University football field. Aremania, the supporter of Arema, crowded the second official training at Gajayana Stadium which is the first training attended by the fans since COVID-19 pandemic. The team launching was held on 20 July 2022 at Gajayana Stadium after winning Indonesia President's Cup three days earlier. Arema new training ground construction in Kedungkandang, Malang began in this season after the design contest was held.

On 5 September 2022, Eduardo Almeida was sacked from coaching the club after earning 3 wins, 2 draws and 3 defeats in the league and replaced as caretaker by assistant coach Kuncoro. One days later, Javier Roca was appointed as new head coach to replace Eduardo Almeida.

On 1 October 2022, In the match which was Super East Java Derby between Arema and Persebaya Surabaya there was a disaster after the match. As a result of the disaster, all leagues matches were suspended for weeks. Besides that, Arema was officially banned from using Kanjuruhan Stadium in home matches and cannot be attended by spectators until the end of the season.

On 6 February 2023, Arema officially ended his collaboration with Javier Roca as coach after having bad results with 5 consecutive defeats. I Putu Gede replaced Javier Roca as caretaker. On 9 March 2023, Arema officially appointed Joko Susilo as head coach to replace I Putu Gede.

At the end of the season, Arema placed 12th in the Liga 1 standings for the 2022–23 season.

== Pre-seasons and friendlies ==
=== Friendlies ===
Date	Opponents	H / A	Result F–A	Scorers	Attendance
22 May 2022	PSIS	H	2–0	Dendi (2) 8', 9'	
30 May 2022	Deltras	H	2–1	Dedik (2) 15' (pen.), 23'	0
4 June 2022	PSIS	A	1–2	Jayus 50'	
7 June 2022	RANS Nusantara	H	4–0	Sagara 25', Zola 75', Dedik 90+7', Bramntio 90+10'	
30 November 2022	Putra Delta Sidoarjo	N	0–0		N/A

=== Indonesian's President Cup ===
==== Group stage ====
Date	Opponents	H / A	Result F–A	Scorers	Attendance	Group position
11 June 2022	PSM	H	0–1		18,724	3rd
15 June 2022	Persik	H	1–0	Irsyad 90+1' (pen.)	16,641	1st
19 June 2022	Persikabo 1973	H	1–0	Zola 9'	18,155	1st

Pos	Team	Pld	W	D	L	GF	GA	GD	Pts	Qualification
1	Arema (H)	3	2	0	1	2	1	+1	6	Knockout stage
2	PSM	3	1	1	1	1	1	0	4	Knockout stage
3	Persik	3	1	1	1	1	1	0	4	
4	Persikabo 1973	3	1	0	2	1	2	−1	3	

Source: Piala Presiden
Rules for classification: 1) Points; 2) Head-to-head; 3) Goal difference; 4) Goals scored.
(H) Hosts

==== Knockout phase ====
Date	Round	Opponents	H / A	Result F–A	Scorers	Attendance
2 July 2022	Quarter-finals	Barito Putera	H	0–0 (5–4p)		14,675
7 July 2022	Semi-finals; First leg	PSIS	A	2–0	Camará 78', Zola 89'	14,743
11 July 2022	Semi-finals; Second leg	PSIS	H	2–1	Rizky 31', Rafli 75'	29,844
14 July 2022	Finals; First leg	Borneo Samarinda	H	1–0	Camará 15'	32,153
17 July 2022	Finals; Second leg	Borneo Samarinda	A	0–0		13,621

=== Trofeo Ronaldinho ===
Date	Opponents	H / A	Result F–A	Scorers	Attendance
26 June 2022	Persik	H	0–0 (4–5p)		12,543
26 June 2022	RANS Nusantara	H	0–0 (4–2p)		12,543

== Match results ==
=== Liga 1 ===
==== Matches ====
Date	Opponents	H / A	Result F–A	Scorers	Attendance	League position
24 July 2022	Borneo Samarinda	A	0–3		2,166	17th
30 July 2022	PSIS	H	2–1	Armaiyn 79', Sérgio 90+5'	12,225	10th
5 August 2022	PSS	H	0–0		13,997	10th
13 August 2022	Bali United	A	2–1	Camará 22', Fajrin 84' (o.g.)	13,754	6th
20 August 2022	PSM	A	0–1		18,383	9th
24 August 2022	RANS Nusantara	H	4–2	Armaiyn 9', Jayus 22', Sérgio 29', Camará 77'	3,077	8th
28 August 2022	Persija	H	0–1		38,155	9th
4 September 2022	Barito Putera	A	1–1	Dedik 83'	7,130	8th
11 September 2022	Persib	H	1–2	Dedik 45'	21,931	10th
17 September 2022	Persik	A	1–0	Irsyad 81'	6,149	9th
1 October 2022	Persebaya	H	2–3	Camará (2) 42', 45+1' (pen.)	42,588	9th
7 December 2022 (Note: The Liga 1 match away to Dewa United, originally scheduled for 7 October 2022, was postponed due to the disaster that occurred at the Kanjuruhan Stadium on 1 October 2022.)	Dewa United	A	2–0	Rizky 28' (pen.), Evan 69'	0	9th
11 December 2022 (Note: The Liga 1 match home to Persis, originally scheduled for 14 October 2022, was postponed due to the disaster that occurred at the Kanjuruhan Stadium on 1 October 2022.)	Persis	H	2–1	Dedik (2) 5' (pen.), 60'	0	9th
14 December 2022 (Note: The Liga 1 match away to Persikabo 1973, originally scheduled for 20 October 2022, was postponed due to the disaster that occurred at the Kanjuruhan Stadium on 1 October 2022.)	Persikabo 1973	A	1–0	Yandi 31' (o.g.)	0	8th
17 December 2022 (Note: The Liga 1 match home to Persita, originally scheduled for 28 October 2022, was postponed due to the disaster that occurred at the Kanjuruhan Stadium on 1 October 2022.)	Persita	H	2–0	Jayus 41', Dedik 56'	0	6th
20 December 2022 (Note: The Liga 1 match home to Madura United, originally scheduled for 4 November 2022, was postponed due to the disaster that occurred at the Kanjuruhan Stadium on 1 October 2022.)	Madura United	H	0–2		0	7th
23 December 2022 (Note: The Liga 1 match home to Bhayangkara, originally scheduled for 10 November 2022, was postponed due to the disaster that occurred at the Kanjuruhan Stadium on 1 October 2022.)	Bhayangkara	A	0–1		0	7th
21 January 2023 (Note: The Liga 1 match away to PSIS, originally scheduled for 2 December 2022, was postponed due to the disaster that occurred at the Kanjuruhan Stadium on 1 October 2022.)	PSIS	A	0–1		6,485	8th
26 January 2023 (Note: The Liga 1 match away to PSS, originally scheduled for 12 December 2022, was postponed due to the a bubble system match after all matches postponed due to disaster that occurred at the Kanjuruhan Stadium on 1 October 2022.)	PSS	A	0–2		13,169	9th
4 February 2023	PSM	H	0–1		0	10th
8 February 2023	RANS Nusantara	A	2–1	Dedik (2) 56', 62'	1,477	9th
12 February 2023	Persija	A	0–2		26,000	10th
18 February 2023	Barito Putera	H	1–0	Armaiyn 65'	0	9th
23 February 2023	Persib	A	0–1		0	11th
28 February 2023	Persik	H	2–3	Rohit 83' (o.g.), Dedik 86'	0	12th
10 March 2023	Dewa United	H	0–0		0	12th
15 March 2023	Persis	A	1–1	Dendi 26'	4,507	13th
19 March 2023	Persikabo 1973	H	3–1	Dedik 71', Rizky 90' (pen.), Zola 90+5'	0	11th
24 March 2023 (Note: The Liga 1 match home to Borneo, originally scheduled for 17 November 2022, was postponed due to the disaster that occurred at the Kanjuruhan Stadium on 1 October 2022. However, this match was again postponed which was originally held on 16 January 2023, due to the Arema not got a home stadium after being rejected in various places.)	Borneo Samarinda	H	0–0		0	12th
27 March 2023 (Note: The Liga 1 match home to Bali United, originally scheduled for 30 January 2023, was postponed due to the Arema not got a home stadium after being rejected in various places.)	Bali United	H	1–3	Evan 84'	0	12th
1 April 2023	Persita	A	1–0	Rizky 88'	2,912	11th
7 April 2023	Madura United	A	1–1	Joko 55'	0	11th
11 April 2023 (Note: The Liga 1 match away to Persebaya, originally scheduled for 5 March 2023, was postponed due to the stadium to be used, namely Gelora Joko Samudro Stadium, Gresik, is less accommodating.)	Persebaya	A	0–1		0	11th
14 April 2023	Bhayangkara	H	0–3		0	12th

==== League table ====
Pos	Team	Pld	W	D	L	GF	GA	GD	Pts
10	Persis	34	11	11	12	50	47	+3	44 (Note: Head-to-head results: Persik 1–3 Persis; Persis 1–0 Persik.)
11	Persik	34	12	8	14	42	43	−1	44
12	Arema	34	12	6	16	32	40	−8	42
13	PSIS	34	12	5	17	44	53	−9	41 (Note: Head-to-head results: PSIS 3–2 Persikabo 1973; Persikabo 1973 0–0 PSIS.)
14	Persikabo 1973	34	11	8	15	43	48	−5	41

Source: BRI Liga 1 2022–23
Rules for classification: 1) Points; 2) Head-to-head points; 3) Head-to-head goal difference; 4) Head-to-head goals scored; 5) Head-to-head away goals scored; 6) Goal difference; 7) Goals scored; 8) Fair-play points; 9) Draw.

== Statistics ==
=== Squad appearances and goals ===
No.	Pos	Nat	Player	Total		Liga 1		Piala Indonesia	
No.	Pos	Nat	Player	Apps	Goals	Apps	Goals	Apps	Goals
Goalkeepers
20	GK	(Indonesia) IDN	Galih Firmansyah	0	0	0	0	0	0
23	GK	(Indonesia) IDN	Teguh Amiruddin	9	0	7+2	0	0	0
33	GK	(Indonesia) IDN	Andriyas Francisco	0	0	0	0	0	0
90	GK	(Brazil) BRA	Adilson Maringá	27	0	27	0	0	0
Defenders
2	DF	(Indonesia) IDN	Joko Susilo	9	1	8+1	1	0	0
3	DF	(Indonesia) IDN	Bayu Aji	5	0	2+3	0	0	0
4	DF	(Portugal) POR	Sérgio Silva	30	2	30	2	0	0
5	DF	(Indonesia) IDN	Bagas Adi	28	0	28	0	0	0
12	DF	(Indonesia) IDN	Rizky Dwi Febrianto	29	3	24+5	3	0	0
24	DF	(Indonesia) IDN	Andik Rendika Rama	9	0	4+5	0	0	0
26	DF	(Indonesia) IDN	Achmad Figo	16	0	9+7	0	0	0
37	DF	(Indonesia) IDN	Ikhfanul Alam	2	0	0+2	0	0	0
44	DF	(Indonesia) IDN	Syaeful Anwar	0	0	0	0	0	0
87	DF	(Indonesia) IDN	Johan Alfarizi	31	0	30+1	0	0	0
Midfielders
6	MF	(Indonesia) IDN	Evan Dimas	30	2	26+4	2	0	0
7	MF	(Indonesia) IDN	Iman Budi Hernandi	2	0	0+2	0	0	0
8	MF	(Japan) JPN	Renshi Yamaguchi	29	0	27+2	0	0	0
11	MF	(Indonesia) IDN	Gian Zola	25	1	13+12	1	0	0
14	MF	(Indonesia) IDN	Jayus Hariono	29	2	26+3	2	0	0
18	MF	(Indonesia) IDN	Kevin Armedyah	2	0	2	0	0	0
19	MF	(Indonesia) IDN	Ahmad Bustomi	1	0	0+1	0	0	0
21	MF	(Indonesia) IDN	Arkhan Fikri	16	0	9+7	0	0	0
28	MF	(Indonesia) IDN	Seiya Da Costa Lay	2	0	0+2	0	0	0
Forwards
10	FW	(Indonesia) IDN	Muhammad Rafli	21	0	6+15	0	0	0
13	FW	(Indonesia) IDN	Hamzah Titofani	17	0	3+14	0	0	0
27	FW	(Indonesia) IDN	Dedik Setiawan	28	9	18+10	9	0	0
29	FW	(Guinea-Bissau) GBS	Abel Camará	22	4	18+4	4	0	0
30	FW	(Indonesia) IDN	Ilham Armaiyn	27	3	14+13	3	0	0
41	FW	(Indonesia) IDN	Dendi Santoso	28	1	25+3	1	0	0
99	FW	(Indonesia) IDN	Kushedya Hari Yudo	4	0	1+3	0	0	0
Players transferred or loaned out during the season the club
15	DF	(Indonesia) IDN	Hasyim Kipuw	5	0	2+3	0	0	0
18	MF	(Indonesia) IDN	Adam Alis	18	0	13+5	0	0	0
22	FW	(Indonesia) IDN	Hanis Sagara	13	0	1+12	0	0	0
88	FW	(Indonesia) IDN	Irsyad Maulana	13	1	1+12	1	0	0

=== Top scorers ===
The list is sorted by shirt number when total goals are equal.

Rnk	Pos	No.	Player	Liga 1	Piala Indonesia	Total
1	FW	27	(Indonesia) Dedik Setiawan	9	0	9
2	FW	29	(Guinea-Bissau) Abel Camará	4	0	4
3	DF	12	(Indonesia) Rizky Dwi Febrianto	3	0	3
3	FW	30	(Indonesia) Ilham Armaiyn	3	0	3
5	DF	4	(Portugal) Sérgio Silva	2	0	2
5	MF	6	(Indonesia) Evan Dimas	2	0	2
5	MF	14	(Indonesia) Jayus Hariono	2	0	2
8	DF	2	(Indonesia) Joko Susilo	1	0	1
8	MF	11	(Indonesia) Gian Zola	1	0	1
8	FW	41	(Indonesia) Dendi Santoso	1	0	1
8	FW	88	(Indonesia) Irsyad Maulana	1	0	1
Own goals				3	0	3
Total				32	0	32

== See also ==
- 2022 Kanjuruhan Stadium disaster
