= 2021–22 Arema F.C. season =

Arema F.C.
2021–22 season
- President: Agoes Soerjanto (until 6 June 2021); Gilang Widya Pramana (from 6 June 2021)
- Head coach: Carlos Oliviera (until 17 February 2021); Kuncoro (interim, 17 February to 3 May 2021); Eduardo Almeida (from 3 May 2021)
- Stadium: Kanjuruhan Stadium
- Liga 1: 4th
- Piala Indonesia: Not held
- Top goalscorer: Carlos Fortes (20)
Home colours	Away colours	Third colours

The 2021–22 Arema F.C. season is Arema's 32nd competitive season. The club will compete in Indonesia League 1. Arema Football Club a professional football club based in Malang, East Java, Indonesia. The season covers the period from 21 January 2021 to 31 March 2022.

== Squad information ==
=== First team squad ===
Note: Flags indicate national team as defined under FIFA eligibility rules; some limited exceptions apply. Players may hold more than one non-FIFA nationality.

No.	Pos.	Nation	Player
4	DF	POR	Sérgio Silva
5	DF	IDN	Bagas Adi
6	DF	IDN	Ikhfanul Alam
7	FW	IDN	Ryan Kurnia
8	MF	JPN	Renshi Yamaguchi
9	FW	POR	Carlos Fortes
10	FW	IDN	Muhammad Rafli
11	FW	IDN	Feby Eka Putra
12	DF	IDN	Rizky Dwi Febrianto
13	FW	IDN	Hamzah Titofani
14	MF	IDN	Jayus Hariono
15	DF	IDN	Fabiano Beltrame (on loan from Persis Solo)
16	FW	IDN	Ridwan Tawainella
18	MF	IDN	Muhammad Faiz
19	MF	IDN	Hanif Sjahbandi (3rd captain)
20	DF	IDN	Achmad Galih

No.	Pos.	Nation	Player
21	DF	IDN	Aji Saka
23	GK	IDN	Teguh Amiruddin
24	DF	IDN	Diego Michiels
26	DF	IDN	Achmad Figo
27	FW	IDN	Dedik Setiawan
28	MF	IDN	Seiya Da Costa Lay
29	MF	IDN	Sandi Sute (on loan from Persis Solo)
31	GK	IDN	Andriyas Francisco
33	DF	IDN	Didik Ariyanto
41	FW	IDN	Dendi Santoso (vice-captain)
77	MF	IDN	Genta Alparedo (on loan from Semen Padang)
78	FW	IDN	Bramntio Ramadhan
87	DF	IDN	Johan Alfarizi (captain)
88	MF	IDN	Vikrian Akbar
90	GK	BRA	Adilson Maringá
99	FW	IDN	Kushedya Hari Yudo

== Transfers ==
=== In ===
No.	Pos	Player	Transferred From	Fee	Date	Source
17	DF	(Indonesia) Sandy Ferizal	Free agent	Free	26 February 2021	
6	DF	(Indonesia) Ikhfanul Alam	(Indonesia) Badak Lampung	Free	3 March 2021	
77	FW	(Indonesia) Wiga Brillian	Free agent	Free	3 March 2021	
33	DF	(Indonesia) Didik Ariyanto	(Indonesia) PSCS	Free	3 March 2021	
35	DF	(Indonesia) Muhammad Roby	(Indonesia) Persekat	Free	10 March 2021	
44	DF	(Indonesia) Ikhwan Ciptady	(Indonesia) Persikabo 1973	Free	14 March 2021	
11	FW	(Indonesia) Feby Eka Putra	(Indonesia) Persija	Free	9 June 2021	
24	DF	(Indonesia) Diego Michiels	(Indonesia) Borneo	Free	14 June 2021	
90	GK	(Brazil) Adilson Maringá	(Portugal) Vilafranquense	Free	22 June 2021	
8	MF	(Japan) Renshi Yamaguchi	(Thailand) Lampang	Free	22 June 2021	
9	FW	(Portugal) Carlos Fortes	(Portugal) Vilafranquense	Free	11 July 2021	
13	FW	(Indonesia) Hamzah Titofani	Youth sector	Promoted	13 July 2021	
78	FW	(Indonesia) Bramntio Ramadhan	Youth sector	Promoted	13 July 2021	
20	DF	(Indonesia) Achmad Galih	Youth sector	Promoted	13 July 2021	
18	MF	(Indonesia) Muhammad Faiz	Youth sector	Promoted	13 July 2021	
4	DF	(Portugal) Sérgio Silva	(Portugal) Feirense	Free	30 August 2021	
7	FW	(Indonesia) Ryan Kurnia	(Indonesia) Sulut United	Free	3 January 2022	

=== Out ===
No.	Pos	Player	Transferred To	Fee	Date	Source
4	DF	(Indonesia) Syaiful Indra Cahya	(Indonesia) Muba Babel United	Free	11 February 2021	
26	DF	(Indonesia) Taufik Hidayat	(Indonesia) PSIM	Free	11 February 2021	
12	MF	(Indonesia) Hendro Siswanto	(Indonesia) Borneo	Free	16 February 2021	
56	FW	(Indonesia) Titan Agung	(Indonesia) Bhayangkara	Free	18 February 2021	
44	DF	(Indonesia) Nur Diansyah	(Indonesia) Borneo	Free	23 February 2021	
15	DF	(Indonesia) Alfin Tuasalamony	(Indonesia) Madura United	Free	26 February 2021	
42	DF	(Indonesia) Ganjar Mukti	(Indonesia) Persiraja	Free	15 March 2021	
35	DF	(Indonesia) Muhammad Roby	(Indonesia) Persiraja	Free	30 March 2021	
8	MF	(Brazil) Bruno Smith	(Brazil) Águia Negra	Free	1 April 2021	
95	DF	(Brazil) Caio Ruan	Free agent	Free	1 April 2021	
44	DF	(Indonesia) Ikhwan Ciptady	(Indonesia) Sriwijaya	Free	9 June 2021	
—	MF	(Indonesia) Ricga Tri Febiyan	Free agent	Free	21 June 2021	
17	DF	(Indonesia) Sandy Ferizal	(Indonesia) Persela	Free	1 July 2021	
92	MF	(Indonesia) Dave Mustaine	(Indonesia) PSS	Free	19 December 2021	
—	FW	(Indonesia) Wiga Brillian	Free agent	Free	1 January 2022	
1	GK	(Indonesia) Utam Rusdiana	Free agent	Free	4 January 2022	

=== Loan In ===
No.	Pos	Player	Loaned From	Start	End	Source
77	MF	(Indonesia) Genta Alparedo	(Indonesia) Semen Padang	20 December 2021	31 March 2022	
29	MF	(Indonesia) Sandi Sute	(Indonesia) Persis	4 January 2022	31 March 2022	
15	DF	(Indonesia) Fabiano Beltrame	(Indonesia) Persis	4 January 2022	31 March 2022	

=== Loan Out ===
No.	Pos	Player	Loaned To	Start	End	Source
1	GK	(Indonesia) Utam Rusdiana	(Indonesia) Persekat	18 June 2021	31 December 2021	
77	FW	(Indonesia) Wiga Brillian	(Indonesia) Hizbul Wathan	22 June 2021	31 August 2021	
—	FW	(Indonesia) Wiga Brillian	(Indonesia) PSKC	22 September 2021	31 December 2021	
96	GK	(Indonesia) Kartika Ajie	(Indonesia) RANS Cilegon	30 September 2021	31 December 2021	
96	GK	(Indonesia) Kartika Ajie	(Indonesia) Barito Putera	6 January 2022	31 March 2022	

== Review and events ==
This season will be the first season for the coach Carlos Oliviera having been appointed as Arema's coach on 17 September 2020 to replace Mario Gómez who resigned in August 2020. Last season Arema FC was in the 12th position before the season competition 2020 was postponed due to COVID-19 pandemic in Indonesia until finally canceled by PSSI after being delayed several times by referring to the results of the PSSI Executive Committee (Exco) meeting which took place virtually on 20 January 2021. However, on 7 February 2021 Arema management will not renew the head coach contract Carlos Oliviera. Carlos Oliviera contract itself will expire on 17 February 2021 and after that date he will be relieved of duty. And the temporary position of head coach was replaced by assistant coach Kuncoro during the pre-seasons tournament 2021 Menpora Cup. On 3 May 2021, Arema officially announced a new coach namely Eduardo Almeida.

Arema also experienced the longest unbeaten run in the 2021–22 season for 23 matches. Started in week 4 against PSIS Semarang with a 0–0 draw and had to stop in week 27 when they lost in the Super East Java Derby against Persebaya Surabaya with a final score of 1–0. At the end of the season, Arema placed 4th in the Liga 1 standings for the 2021–22 season.

== Pre-seasons and friendlies ==
=== Friendlies ===
Date	Opponents	H / A	Result F–A	Scorers	Attendance
6 March 2021	Arema U20s	N	7–2	Brillian (2), Seiya, Rizky, Jayus, Dedik (2)	0
15 March 2021	Madura United	H	2–2	Dedik (2)	0
29 May 2021	Malang Selection	H	8–0	Dedik (2), Hanif, Feby, Brillian, Ferizal, Tegar, Tito	0
6 June 2021	RANS Cilegon	H	6–2	Feby 11', Dedik 35', Dave 46', Gonzáles 53' (o.g.), Dendi 74', Tito 90+7'	0
12 June 2021	Hizbul Wathan	N	4–2	Ridwan 5', Dedik (2) 10', 81' (pen.), Dave 85'	0
19 June 2021	Arema U20s	N	5–1	Hanif 40', Dedik (2) 50', 85', Kushedya (2) 60', 79'	0
19 August 2021	PSIM	A	0–1		0
21 August 2021	Persis	N	0–0		0

=== Menpora Cup ===
==== Group stage ====
Date	Opponents	H / A	Result F–A	Scorers	Attendance	Group position
21 March 2021	Persikabo 1973	N	1–1	Dendi 82'	0	3rd
25 March 2021	Barito Putera	N	1–2	Feby 54'	0	3rd
30 March 2021	PSIS	N	2–3	Dedik (2) 9', 67' (pen.)	0	4th

Pos	Team	Pld	W	D	L	GF	GA	GD	Pts	Qualification
1	PSIS	3	2	1	0	9	6	+3	7	Knockout stage
2	Barito Putera	3	1	2	0	7	6	+1	5	Knockout stage
3	Persikabo 1973	3	0	2	1	4	6	−2	2	
4	Arema	3	0	1	2	4	6	−2	1	
5	Persipura	0	0	0	0	0	0	0	0	

Source: Piala Menpora

== Match results ==
=== Liga 1 ===
==== Matches ====
Date	Opponents	H / A	Result F–A	Scorers	Attendance	League position
Series 1 (Jakarta, West Java & Banten)
5 September 2021	PSM	A	1–1	Hanif 22' (pen.)	0	7th
12 September 2021	Bhayangkara	H	1–1	Dendi 72'	0	12th
19 September 2021	PSS	A	1–2	Alfarizi 34'	0	14th
25 September 2021	PSIS	H	0–0		0	14th
29 September 2021	Persipura	A	1–0	Fortes 7'	0	10th
3 October 2021	Persela	H	3–0	Fortes (2) 17', 22', Rafli 34'	0	6th
Series 2 (Central Java & Special Region of Yogyakarta)
17 October 2021	Persija	A	1–0	Fortes 33'	0	4th
23 October 2021	Persiraja	A	2–0	Rafli 4', Fortes 56'	0	4th
27 October 2021	Persita	H	2–2	Kushedya 25', Dedik 45+1'	0	4th
1 November 2021	Madura United	A	2–1	Kushedya 50', Rizky 90'	0	3rd
6 November 2021	Persebaya	H	2–2	Fortes 11' (pen.), Rafli 21'	0	3rd
Series 3 (Central Java & Special Region of Yogyakarta)
19 November 2021	Persik	A	3–2	Fortes 33' (pen.), Alfarizi 43', Feby 45+3'	0	3rd
23 November 2021	Barito Putera	H	2–1	Fortes 47' (pen.), Rafli 88'	0	3rd
28 November 2021	Persib	A	1–0	Dendi 17'	0	2nd
5 December 2021	Bali United	H	0–0		0	3rd
10 December 2021	Borneo	A	2–1	Fortes (2) 66', 72'	0	2nd
5 January 2022 (Note: The Liga 1 match home to Persikabo 1973, originally scheduled for 14 December 2021, was postponed due to PPKM Level 3 policy for all regions of Indonesia during the 2021 Christmas and 2022 New Year holidays and the 2020 AFF Championship.)	Persikabo 1973	H	0–0		0	2nd
Series 4 (Bali)
9 January 2022	Bhayangkara	A	1–0	Rizky 20'	0	2nd
13 January 2022	PSS	H	2–0	Kushedya 53', Dendi 56'	0	1st
17 January 2022	PSIS	A	0–0		0	2nd
28 January 2022	Persipura	H	1–0	Fortes 30'	0	1st
1 February 2022	Persela	A	1–0	Ridwan 90'	0	1st
5 February 2022	Persija	H	1–1	Fortes 57'	0	2nd
10 February 2022	Persiraja	H	1–1	Fortes 48' (pen.)	0	1st
15 February 2022	Persita	A	2–0	Fortes (2) 45', 67'	0	1st
18 February 2022	Madura United	H	1–0	Fortes 15'	0	1st
23 February 2022	Persebaya	A	0–1		0	2nd
27 February 2022	Persik	H	0–1		0	3rd
Series 5 (Bali)
5 March 2022	Barito Putera	A	2–1	Rafli 18', Fortes 36'	0	3rd
9 March 2022	Persib	H	1–2	Jayus 54'	0	5th
15 March 2022	Bali United	A	1–2	Fortes 33' (pen.)	0	5th
20 March 2022	Borneo	H	2–2	Alfarizi (2) 52', 74'	0	5th
24 March 2022	Persikabo 1973	A	3–1	Rizky 62', Alfarizi 69', Fortes 82'	0	5th
30 March 2022	PSM	H	1–0	Fortes 86'	0	4th

==== League table ====
Pos	Team	Pld	W	D	L	GF	GA	GD	Pts
2	Persib	34	20	9	5	48	22	+26	69
3	Bhayangkara	34	19	9	6	48	27	+21	66
4	Arema	34	18	11	5	44	25	+19	65
5	Persebaya	34	18	9	7	56	35	+21	63
6	Borneo	34	14	10	10	43	35	+8	52

Source: BRI Liga 1 2021–22
Rules for classification: 1) Points; 2) Head-to-head; 3) Goal difference; 4) Goals scored; 5) Drawing.

== Statistics ==
=== Squad appearances and goals ===
No.	Pos	Nat	Player	Total		Liga 1	
No.	Pos	Nat	Player	Apps	Goals	Apps	Goals
Goalkeepers
23	GK	(Indonesia) IDN	Teguh Amiruddin	5	0	4+1	0
31	GK	(Indonesia) IDN	Andriyas Francisco	0	0	0	0
90	GK	(Brazil) BRA	Adilson Maringá	30	0	30	0
Defenders
4	DF	(Portugal) POR	Sérgio Silva	32	0	31+1	0
5	DF	(Indonesia) IDN	Bagas Adi	28	0	28	0
6	DF	(Indonesia) IDN	Ikhfanul Alam	1	0	0+1	0
12	DF	(Indonesia) IDN	Rizky Dwi Febrianto	27	3	25+2	3
15	DF	(Indonesia) IDN	Fabiano Beltrame	9	0	5+4	0
20	DF	(Indonesia) IDN	Achmad Galih	0	0	0	0
21	DF	(Indonesia) IDN	Aji Saka	0	0	0	0
24	DF	(Indonesia) IDN	Diego Michiels	18	0	12+6	0
26	DF	(Indonesia) IDN	Achmad Figo	4	0	2+2	0
33	DF	(Indonesia) IDN	Didik Ariyanto	2	0	0+2	0
87	DF	(Indonesia) IDN	Johan Alfarizi	34	5	32+2	5
Midfielders
8	MF	(Japan) JPN	Renshi Yamaguchi	31	0	31	0
14	MF	(Indonesia) IDN	Jayus Hariono	28	1	20+8	1
18	MF	(Indonesia) IDN	Muhammad Faiz	2	0	0+2	0
19	MF	(Indonesia) IDN	Hanif Sjahbandi	28	1	21+7	1
28	DF	(Indonesia) IDN	Seiya Da Costa Lay	0	0	0	0
29	MF	(Indonesia) IDN	Sandi Sute	14	0	4+10	0
77	MF	(Indonesia) IDN	Genta Alparedo	10	0	1+9	0
88	MF	(Indonesia) IDN	Vikrian Akbar	0	0	0	0
Forwards
7	FW	(Indonesia) IDN	Ryan Kurnia	14	0	9+5	0
9	FW	(Portugal) POR	Carlos Fortes	31	20	30+1	20
10	FW	(Indonesia) IDN	Muhammad Rafli	27	5	18+9	5
11	FW	(Indonesia) IDN	Feby Eka Putra	18	1	7+11	1
13	FW	(Indonesia) IDN	Hamzah Titofani	19	0	6+13	0
16	FW	(Indonesia) IDN	Ridwan Tawainella	18	1	5+13	1
27	FW	(Indonesia) IDN	Dedik Setiawan	23	1	13+10	1
41	FW	(Indonesia) IDN	Dendi Santoso	30	3	27+3	3
78	FW	(Indonesia) IDN	Bramntio Ramadhan	6	0	0+6	0
99	FW	(Indonesia) IDN	Kushedya Hari Yudo	14	3	12+2	3
Players transferred or loaned out during the season the club
92	MF	(Indonesia) IDN	Dave Mustaine	6	0	1+5	0
96	GK	(Indonesia) IDN	Kartika Ajie	0	0	0	0

=== Top scorers ===
The list is sorted by shirt number when total goals are equal.

Rnk	Pos	No.	Player	Liga 1	Total
1	FW	9	(Portugal) Carlos Fortes	20	20
2	FW	10	(Indonesia) Muhammad Rafli	5	5
2	DF	87	(Indonesia) Johan Alfarizi	5	5
4	DF	12	(Indonesia) Rizky Dwi Febrianto	3	3
4	FW	41	(Indonesia) Dendi Santoso	3	3
4	FW	99	(Indonesia) Kushedya Hari Yudo	3	3
7	FW	11	(Indonesia) Feby Eka Putra	1	1
7	MF	14	(Indonesia) Jayus Hariono	1	1
7	FW	16	(Indonesia) Ridwan Tawainella	1	1
7	MF	19	(Indonesia) Hanif Sjahbandi	1	1
7	FW	27	(Indonesia) Dedik Setiawan	1	1
Total				44	44
