= Leioproctus michenerianus =

Scientific classification
- Kingdom: Animalia
- Phylum: Arthropoda
- Clade: Pancrustacea
- Class: Insecta
- Order: Hymenoptera
- Family: Colletidae
- Genus: Leioproctus
- Species: L. michenerianus

Binomial name
- Leioproctus michenerianus (Almeida 2008)

Synonyms
- Andrenopsis michenerianus Almeida, 2008

Species of bee

Leioproctus michenerianus, or Leioproctus (Andrenopsis) michenerianus, is a species of bee in the family Colletidae and subfamily Colletinae. It is endemic to Australia. It was described by Brazilian entomologist Eduardo Almeida in 2008.

== Etymology ==
The specific epithet michenerianus honours American entomologist Charles Duncan Michener.

== Description ==
The holotype male body length is 9.23 mm, forewing length 6.2 mm, head width 3.28 mm, The allotype female body length is 11.14 mm, forewing length 6.78 mm, head width 3.76 mm. Integumental colouration is mainly black and dark brown. The hair is white to yellowish.

== Distribution and habitat ==
The species occurs in Western Australia. The type locality is Badgingarra National Park.

== Behaviour ==
The adults are flying mellivores.
