= Rumbiak =

Rumbiak is a surname. Notable people with this surname include:

- Ardiles Rumbiak (born 1986), Indonesian football player
- Franklin Rumbiak (born 1989), Indonesian football player
- Imanuel Rumbiak (born 1998), Indonesian football player
- Jacob Rumbiak (born 1958), West Papuan academic and political leader
- John Rumbiak (born 1962), West Papuan human rights and environment activist
