= Genta Alparedo =

Indonesian association footballer

Personal information
- Full name: Genta Alparedo
- Date of birth: 7 October 2001 (age 25)
- Place of birth: Padang, Indonesia
- Height: 1.69 m (5 ft 7 in)
- Position: Midfielder

Team information
- Current team: De Red
- Number: 79

Youth career
- 2018: PPLP Sumatra Barat
- 2018: Porprov Solok Selatan
- 2019–2020: Semen Padang

Senior career*
Years	Team	Apps	(Gls)
2020–2024	Semen Padang	14	(0)
2021–2022	→ Arema (loan)	10	(0)
2024	Sriwijaya	3	(0)
2025	Persiku Kudus	7	(0)
2025–2026	Persekat Tegal	12	(0)
2026–	De Red	4	(0)

International career
2021	Indonesia U23	2	(0)
2021	Indonesia	1	(0)
- * Club domestic league appearances and goals as of 2 October 2026

Genta Alparedo (born 7 October 2001) is an Indonesian professional footballer who plays as a midfielder for Championship club De Red.

== Club career ==
=== Semen Padang ===
After years of training in the Semen Padang youth system in his hometown of Padang, Alparedo was promoted to the senior team in 2020 but failed to debut because the 2020 Liga 2 season was canceled before it began due to the COVID-19 pandemic.

==== Arema (loan) ====
In January 2022, Alparedo signed a contract with Liga 1 club Arema on loan from Persis Solo. He made his league debut in a 2–0 win against PSS Sleman on 13 January 2022 as a substitute for Kushedya Hari Yudo in the 72nd minute at the Kapten I Wayan Dipta Stadium, Gianyar.

== International career ==
Alparedo had never played for any Indonesian youth team or in any professional game when Indonesia national team coach Shin Tae-yong in May 2021 called him to join the senior team. He was also the only lower-league player in the selected list. He earned his first cap when he came in as a substitute in a 25 May friendly match in Dubai against Afghanistan. In October 2021, Genta was called up to the Indonesia U23 in a friendly match against Tajikistan and Nepal and also prepared for 2022 AFC U-23 Asian Cup qualification in Tajikistan by Shin Tae-yong.

== Career statistics ==
=== Club ===
As of 2 October 2026

Appearances and goals by club, season and competition
Club	Season	League			Cup		Continental		Other		Total	
Club	Season	Division	Apps	Goals	Apps	Goals	Apps	Goals	Apps	Goals	Apps	Goals
Semen Padang	2021–22	Liga 2	2	0	0	0	—		0	0	2	0
Semen Padang	2022–23	Liga 2	2	0	0	0	—		0	0	2	0
Semen Padang	2023–24	Liga 2	10	0	0	0	—		0	0	10	0
Arema (loan)	2021–22	Liga 1	10	0	0	0	—		0	0	10	0
Sriwijaya	2024–25	Liga 2	3	0	0	0	–		0	0	3	0
Persiku Kudus	2024–25	Liga 2	7	0	0	0	–		0	0	7	0
Persekat Tegal	2025–26	Championship	12	0	0	0	–		0	0	12	0
De Red	2026–27	Championship	4	0	0	0	–		0	0	4	0
Career total			50	0	0	0	0	0	0	0	50	0

=== International ===
As of match played 11 June 2021

Appearances and goals by national team and year
National team	Year	Apps	Goals
Indonesia	2021	1	0
Total		1	0

== Honours ==
Semen Padang

- Liga 2 runner-up: 2023–24
