= Andre Putra Wibowo =

Indonesian association footballer

Andre Putra
Personal information
- Full name: Andre Putra Wibowo
- Date of birth: September 17, 1996 (age 30)
- Place of birth: Klaten, Indonesia
- Height: 1.75 m (5 ft 9 in)
- Positions: Right-back; midfielder

Youth career
- 2015: Persak Kebumen
- 2016: Gresik United

Senior career*
Years	Team	Apps	(Gls)
2017	Gresik United	10	(0)
2018	Madura	22	(0)
2019	Persiba Balikpapan	16	(0)
2020	Persis Solo	0	(0)
2022	Persijap Jepara	4	(0)
2023–2024	Bekasi City	2	(0)
- * Club domestic league appearances and goals as of 10 October 2023

Andre Putra Wibowo (born September 17, 1996) is an Indonesian professional footballer who plays as a right-back or midfielder.

== Club career ==
=== Persis Solo ===
He was signed for Persis Solo to play in Liga 2 in the 2020 season.

== Career statistics ==
=== Club ===
As of match played 10 October 2023

Club	Season	League			Cup		Continental		Total	
Club	Season	Division	Apps	Goals	Apps	Goals	Apps	Goals	Apps	Goals
Gresik United	2017	Liga 1	10	0	0	0	0	0	10	0
Madura	2018	Liga 2	22	0	0	0	0	0	22	0
Persiba Balikpapan	2019	Liga 2	16	0	0	0	0	0	16	0
Persis Solo	2020–21	Liga 2	0	0	0	0	0	0	0	0
Persijap Jepara	2022–23	Liga 2	4	0	0	0	0	0	4	0
Bekasi City	2023–24	Liga 2	2	0	0	0	0	0	2	0
Career total			54	0	0	0	0	0	54	0
