= Muhammad Rafli =

Indonesian footballer

Personal information
- Full name: Muhammad Rafli
- Date of birth: 24 November 1998 (age 27)
- Place of birth: Malang, Indonesia
- Height: 1.80 m (5 ft 11 in)
- Positions: Attacking midfielder; forward

Team information
- Current team: RANS Nusantara
- Number: 10

Youth career
- 2006–2014: ASIOP Apacinti
- 2016: Bhayangkara
- 2016–2017: ASIFA

Senior career*
| Years | Team | Apps | (Gls) |
| 2017–2026 | Arema | 144 | (9) |
| 2026 | → Deltras (loan) | 8 | (0) |
| 2026– | RANS Nusantara | 1 | (0) |

International career
| 2016 | Indonesia U19 | 4 | (2) |
| 2019–2021 | Indonesia U23 | 10 | (5) |
| 2021–2023 | Indonesia | 13 | (0) |
Medal record
Men's football
Representing Indonesia
Southeast Asian Games
| Silver medal – second place | 2019 Philippines | Team |
- * Club domestic league appearances and goals as of 13 September 2026

Muhammad Rafli (born 24 November 1998) is an Indonesian professional footballer who plays for Championship club RANS Nusantara. A versatile player, Rafli plays as a midfielder or forward, and has been deployed in a variety of attacking roles – as an attacking midfielder, second striker, centre forward and on either wings.

Rafli began to be known when he was selected in 2016 to attend the now-defunct Nike Academy, a program run by Nike Inc. for selected under-20 players scouted worldwide known as 'Nike Most Wanted' players. The only other Indonesian who participated in this academy was the national team's current playmaker Evan Dimas, in 2012.

== Club career ==
=== Early career ===
He began to pursue soccer by entering the Aji Santoso International Football Academy (ASIFA) in his hometown of Malang. ASIFA, founded by former national team captain and coach Aji Santoso, is a feeder for Arema F.C. and other professional teams in East Java.

=== Arema FC ===
Rafli signed his first professional contract with Arema F.C. in January 2017. Rafli made his Arema debut on 23 April 2017 in a Liga 1 match against Bhayangkara in a 2–0 home win. He contributed with only 7 league appearances, without scoring during his 2017 season.

On 27 April 2018, he made his first start and played the full 90 minutes for the first time, in a 3–1 win against Persipura Jayapura. On 14 October, Rafli provided an assist for Ahmad Nur Hardianto in a 2–1 lose over PSM Makassar. However, Rafli also made a blunder against the host's winning goal scored by Guy Junior Ondoua. He contributed with only 19 league appearances, without scoring during his 2018 season. In December 2018, he signed a new deal with Arema for two-years contract.

On 18 February 2019, Rafli starting his match in 2019 season in the first leg of 2018–19 Piala Indonesia round of 16 in a 1–1 draw against Persib Bandung. He also scored his first goal for Arema, scored in the 75th minutes. In the second leg in Malang four days later, Arema eventually draw the match 2–2, and were eliminated from the competition. Despite this, He won his second trophy with the club in April 2019, making first appearance for the first time until last appearances in the second leg of 2019 Indonesia President's Cup final against the rival Persebaya Surabaya. He scored his first Liga 1 goal on 2 October 2019. It was the first goal in a 0–2 victory against PSM Makassar. On 16 December 2019, he scored in a 3–2 win over Bali United. He contributed with 17 league appearances with four times as a starting, scored 2 goals and 1 assist during his 2019 season.

Prior to the start of the 2020 season, Rafli switched his shirt number from 30 to 10, last season, the number was worn by Malian foreign player Makan Konaté, who has now left for rival club Persebaya Surabaya. On 2 March 2020, Rafli provided an assist for Kushedya Hari Yudo in a 0–2 away win over TIRA-Persikabo at the Pakansari Stadium. Rafli only played 3 times and 1 assist for the club because the league was officially discontinued due to the COVID-19 pandemic.

On 3 October 2021, Rafli scored his first goal of the 2021–22 season, scoring from the free-kick in the 34th minute, final result, Arema win 3–0 over Persela Lamongan in the 2021–22 Liga 1. On 23 October, he scored the opening goal with scoring from the free-kick in the 4th minute, final result, Arema win 2–0 over Persiraja Banda Aceh. On 6 November, he scored in a Super East Java Derby against Persebaya Surabaya, final result, Arema draw 2–2. On 23 November 2021, he scored the winning goal in a 2–1 home win against PS Barito Putera and scored the opening goal in a 1–2 away win against the same opponent on 2 March 2022. Rafli finished the season with 5 goals, 1 assist in 27 games.

== International career ==
Rafli made his international debut for Indonesia U-19 on 14 September 2016 against Thailand U-19. and he scoring one goal against Laos on 18 September 2016. He made his international debut for Indonesia U-23 on 7 June 2019 against Thailand U-23 and scored three goals against Philippines U-23 on 9 June 2019, both at 2019 Merlion Cup. Rafli was part of the Indonesia team that won silver in the 2019 Southeast Asian Games in the Philippines. He received a call to join the senior Indonesia national football team in May 2021. He earned his first senior cap in a 25 May 2021 unofficial FIFA friendly match in Dubai against Afghanistan, in which he was also the team captain.

== Career statistics ==
=== Club ===
As of match played 13 September 2026

| Club | Season | League | | Cup (Note: Includes Piala Indonesia) | | Continental | | Other (Note: Appearances in Piala Presiden) | | Total | |
| Club | Season | Apps | Goals | Apps | Goals | Apps | Goals | Apps | Goals | Apps | Goals |
|---|---|---|---|---|---|---|---|---|---|---|---|
| Arema | 2017 | 7 | 0 | 0 | 0 | — | | 1 | 0 | 8 | 0 |
| Arema | 2018 | 19 | 0 | 0 | 0 | — | | 1 | 0 | 20 | 0 |
| Arema | 2019 | 17 | 2 | 2 | 1 | — | | 5 | 0 | 24 | 3 |
| Arema | 2020 | 3 | 0 | 0 | 0 | — | | 0 | 0 | 3 | 0 |
| Arema | 2021–22 | 27 | 5 | 0 | 0 | — | | 0 | 0 | 27 | 5 |
| Arema | 2022–23 | 21 | 0 | 0 | 0 | — | | 6 | 1 | 27 | 1 |
| Arema | 2023–24 | 26 | 0 | 0 | 0 | — | | 0 | 0 | 26 | 0 |
| Arema | 2024–25 | 19 | 2 | 0 | 0 | — | | 3 | 0 | 22 | 2 |
| Arema | 2025–26 | 5 | 0 | 0 | 0 | — | | 1 | 0 | 6 | 0 |
| Arema | Total | 144 | 9 | 2 | 1 | — | | 17 | 1 | 163 | 11 |
| Deltras (loan) | 2025–26 | 8 | 0 | 0 | 0 | — | | 0 | 0 | 8 | 0 |
| RANS Nusantara (loan) | 2026–27 | 1 | 0 | 0 | 0 | — | | 0 | 0 | 1 | 0 |
| Career total | | 153 | 9 | 2 | 1 | 0 | 0 | 17 | 1 | 172 | 11 |

=== International ===
As of match played 9 January 2023

Appearances and goals by national team and year
| National team | Year | Apps | Goals |
|---|---|---|---|
| Indonesia | 2021 | 4 | 0 |
| Indonesia | 2022 | 8 | 0 |
| Indonesia | 2023 | 1 | 0 |
| Total | | 13 | 0 |

International under-23 goals

| Goal | Date | Venue | Opponent | Score | Result | Competition |
|---|---|---|---|---|---|---|
| 1. | 9 June 2019 | Jalan Besar Stadium, Kallang, Singapore | Philippines | 1–0 | 5–0 | 2019 Merlion Cup |
| 2. | 9 June 2019 | Jalan Besar Stadium, Kallang, Singapore | Philippines | 3–0 | 5–0 | 2019 Merlion Cup |
| 3. | 9 June 2019 | Jalan Besar Stadium, Kallang, Singapore | Philippines | 4–0 | 5–0 | 2019 Merlion Cup |
| 4. | 13 November 2019 | Kapten I Wayan Dipta Stadium, Gianyar, Indonesia | Iran | 1–0 | 1–1 | Friendly Match |
| 5. | 16 November 2019 | Pakansari Stadium, Bogor, Indonesia | Iran | 1–0 | 2–1 | Friendly Match |

== Honours ==
=== Club ===
Arema

- Piala Presiden: 2017, 2019, 2022, 2024

=== International ===
Indonesia U23

- SEA Games silver medal: 2019

=== Individual ===
- Merlion Cup Top Goalscorer: 2019 (3 goals)
