= 2022–23 Liga 2 (Indonesia) =

Liga 2
- Season: 2022–23
- Dates: 28 August 2022 – 12 January 2023
- Champions: Not awarded
- Relegated: None
- Matches: 88
- Goals: 193 (2.19 per match)
- Top goalscorer: Zulham Zamrun (6 goals)
- Biggest home win: Semen Padang 5–0 Perserang; Persiba 5–0 Kalteng Putra (22 September 2022); Deltras 5–0 Kalteng Putra (30 September 2022)
- Biggest away win: PSPS 3–4 PSMS (22 September 2022)
- Highest scoring: PSPS 3–4 PSMS (22 September 2022)
- Longest winning run: PSMS (5 games)
- Longest unbeaten run: PSMS (6 games)
- Longest winless run: Gresik United (3 games)
- Longest losing run: Kalteng Putra (4 games)
- Highest attendance: 14,013; Persewar 0–0 Persipura (1 October 2022)
- Lowest attendance: 52; Nusantara United 0–0 Persikab (23 September 2022)
- Total attendance: 318,059
- Average attendance: 3,614
- All statistics correct as of 1 October 2022.

The 2022–23 Liga 2 was the sixth season of the Liga 2 under its current name and the 13th season under its current league structure. 28 teams, an increase of four teams from the previous season's campaign, participated for the season.

The league along with 2022–23 Liga 3 were abandoned due to a combination of factors, the most notable among them was the Kanjuruhan Stadium disaster.

== Teams ==
=== Team changes ===
The following teams changed division after the 2021 season.

To Liga 2

Relegated from Liga 1

- Persipura
- Persela
- Persiraja

Promoted from Liga 3

- Karo United
- Putra Delta Sidoarjo
- PSDS
- Nusantara United (replacing Mataram Utama)
- Deltras
- Persikab
- Persipa
- Gresik United
- Persipal BU (via acquisition of Muba Babel United)
From Liga 2

Promoted to Liga 1

- Persis
- RANS Cilegon
- Dewa United

Relegated to Liga 3

- Tiga Naga
- Badak Lampung
- Hizbul Wathan
- Mitra Kukar

=== Name changes ===
- AHHA PS Pati relocated to Bekasi and were renamed to Bekasi FC However, following a lawsuit by Bekasi FC's original rights holder, the club is subject to another name change. On 30 May 2022, during the 2022 PSSI Ordinary Congress, the club finally changed their name once again to Bekasi City.
- Mataram Utama handed over their senior team to a group of investors, who subsequently rebranded the club as Nusantara United. The two clubs exist as separate entities, with Nusantara United taking over Mataram Utama's place in the Liga 2, while Mataram Utama redirected their focus towards youth development and their football academy. On 5 July, Nusantara United, on an Instagram post unveiling their new logo, revealed that they are now based in Nusantara, the planned new capital of Indonesia.
- Muba Babel United was acquired by Liga 3 side Persipal Palu. As a result, Persipal took over Muba Babel United's place in Liga 2 starting from the 2022–23 season and they will compete under name Persipal BU.

=== Stadiums and locations ===
Locations of non-Java-based 2022–23 Liga 2 teams.
Red: West Region; Yellow: Central Region; Green: East Region
Locations of Java-based 2022–23 Liga 2 teams

Team	Location	Stadium	Capacity
Bekasi City	Bekasi	Patriot Candrabhaga	30,000
Deltras	Sidoarjo	Gelora Delta	35,000
Gresik United	Gresik	Gelora Joko Samudro	40,000
Kalteng Putra	Palangka Raya	Tuah Pahoe	10,000
Karo United	Karo	Teladan, at Medan	20,000
Nusantara United	Salatiga	Moch. Soebroto, at Magelang (Note: As the city of Nusantara is still under construction until at least 2024, Nusantara United will temporarily base themselves at the city of Salatiga, however they will play league games at the Moch. Soebroto Stadium in nearby Magelang.)	20,000
Persekat	Tegal	Tri Sanja	10,000
Persela	Lamongan	Surajaya	16,000
Perserang	Serang	Maulana Yusuf	15,000
Persewar	Waropen	Mandala, at Jayapura	30,000
Persiba	Balikpapan	Batakan	40,000
Persijap	Jepara	Gelora Bumi Kartini	20,000
Persikab	Bandung	Si Jalak Harupat	30,100
Persipa	Pati	Joyokusumo	20,000
Persipal BU	Palu	Gawalise	20,000
Persipura	Jayapura	Lukas Enembe	40,263
Persiraja	Banda Aceh	H. Dimurthala	20,000
PSBS	Biak Numfor	Cendrawasih	15,000
PSCS	Cilacap	Wijayakusuma	15,000
PSDS	Deli Serdang	Baharuddin Siregar	15,000
PSIM	Yogyakarta	Mandala Krida (Note: PSIM also registered the Sultan Agung Stadium in Bantul as the Mandala Krida doesn't have the required lighting for matches played at night.)	35,000
PSKC	Cimahi	Si Jalak Harupat, at Bandung	30,100
PSMS	Medan	Teladan	20,000
PSPS	Pekanbaru	Riau Main	43,923
Putra Delta Sidoarjo	Sidoarjo	Gelora Supriyadi, at Blitar	15,000
Semen Padang	Padang	Gelora Haji Agus Salim	20,000
Sriwijaya	Palembang	Bumi Sriwijaya (Note: Sriwijaya will play their first few home games at the Lapangan Atletik 1 within the Jakabaring Sport City complex as the Bumi Sriwijaya is still undergoing renovation work.)	6,000
Sulut United	Manado	Klabat	10,000

=== Personnel and kits ===
Note: Flags indicate national team as has been defined under FIFA eligibility rules. Players and coaches may hold more than one non-FIFA nationality.

Team	Head coach	Captain	Kit manufacturer	Shirt Sponsor(s)
Bekasi City	(Indonesia) Jafri Sastra	(Indonesia) Hamka Hamzah	(Indonesia) Allvane	PStore^{1}, AHHA^{1}
Deltras	(Indonesia) Ibnu Grahan	(Indonesia) Rendi Irwan	(Indonesia) DTS Apparel^{5}	Kapal Api^{1}, RANS Entertainment^{1}, MPM Honda Distributor^{3}
Gresik United	Vacant	(Indonesia) Imam Witoyo	(Indonesia) GUS Apparel^{5}	ISO Plus^{1}, Hyundai Gowa^{1}, Rumah Makan Bandeng Pak Elan 2^{1}, Alkesmart^{1}, Wilmar^{2}, Smelting Peduli^{3}
Kalteng Putra	(Indonesia) Eko Tamamie	(Indonesia) Nur Akbar Jawara Munir	(Indonesia) WWJD Sport	Agustiar Sabran Foundation^{1}, Halo Dayak^{1}, Bank Kalteng^{1}
Karo United	(Indonesia) Suharto AD	(Indonesia) Aidun Sastra Utami	(Indonesia) False9	Vokraf^{1}, Simgroup^{1}, NG Corporation^{3}
Nusantara United	(Indonesia) Slamet Riadi	(Indonesia) Tegar Hening Pangestu	(Indonesia) Adhoc	Adaro Minerals^{1}, IDN Media^{1}, Gudang Digital^{2}
Persekat	Vacant	(Indonesia) Soni Setiawan	(Indonesia) Sebayu^{5}	Tegal Road Construction^{1}, Bhamada University^{1}, RSUD dr. Soeselo Slawi^{2}, Trendys Production^{3}
Persela	Vacant	(Indonesia) Zulham Zamrun	(Indonesia) Grygera	So Nice^{1}, Belikopi^{1}
Perserang	(Indonesia) Syafrianto Rusli	(Indonesia) Egi Melgiansyah	(Indonesia) CRV	
Persewar	(Indonesia) Eduard Ivakdalam	(Indonesia) Elvis Harewan	(Indonesia) Grygera	Bank Papua^{1} ^{3}, Nitmeke Adventure^{1}, Milan Group^{2}, Waropen^{2}
Persiba	(Indonesia) Ilham Romadhona	(Indonesia) Muhammad Roby	(Indonesia) GW Apparel	PSF Group^{1}, Herald Indonesia^{3}
Persijap	(Indonesia) Salahudin	(Indonesia) Andre Putra Wibowo	(Indonesia) Made by club	Oasis Water^{1} ^{2} ^{4} Oasis Blu^{1} Oasis+^{1} ^{3}
Persikab	(Indonesia) Stefan Keltjes	(Indonesia) Dimas Sukarno Putra	(Indonesia) BB Sportwear^{5}	Bank BJB^{1}, Extra Joss^{2}, OHIMen^{2}, Ron88^{3}, Asbhoel^{3}
Persipa	(Indonesia) Nazal Mustofa	(Indonesia) Rachmat Latief	(Indonesia) Nine	BPR KCA^{1}, Hakim Terpal^{1}, Zerone Japan^{1}, Sukun^{2}, Hwi Hwaseung^{3}, Jurnalindo.com^{3}
Persipal BU	(Indonesia) Bambang Nurdiansyah	(Indonesia) Fajar Handika	(Indonesia) Made by club	PT Pembangunan Sulawesi Tengah^{1}, MTG Systems^{1}, Citra Shipyard^{1}, Bank Sulteng^{2}, RMP^{3}
Persipura	(Indonesia) Ricky Nelson	(Indonesia) Ian Louis Kabes	(Indonesia) SPECS	Bank Papua^{1}, Freeport Indonesia^{1}, Ulam Laut Nusantara^{2}
Persiraja	(Indonesia) Washiyatul Akmal	(Indonesia) Mukhlis Nakata	(Indonesia) Northon	Tabarak Restoran Arab^{1}, Atjeh Advertising^{1}, AVO^{1}, Tabarak Tour & Travel Umrah^{2}
PSBS	(Indonesia) Ega Raka Ghalih	(Indonesia) Yohanis Tjoe	(Indonesia) Rabona	Bank Papua^{1} ^{2}, Biak Numfor^{1}, Benneta Voice^{1}, CV King David^{1}
PSCS	(Indonesia) Hendri Susilo	(Indonesia) Tri Rahmad Priadi	(Indonesia) Nine	PSF Group^{1}
PSDS	(Indonesia) Susanto	(Indonesia) Muhammad Irfan	(Indonesia) Zeals	
PSIM	(Indonesia) Erwan Hendarwanto	(Indonesia) Aditya Putra Dewa	(Indonesia) Seven Stars	Vidio^{1}, Smoot^{1}, Tolak Angin^{2}
PSKC	(Indonesia) Joko Susilo	(Indonesia) Taufiq Kasrun	(Indonesia) Benz	
PSMS	(Indonesia) I Putu Gede	(Indonesia) Joko Susilo	(Indonesia) Adhoc	Bank Sumut^{1}, Inalum^{1}, PDAM Tirtanadi^{1}, Pelindo^{1}
PSPS	Vacant	(Indonesia) Dian Agus Prasetyo	(Malaysia) 93 Sports	Hotel Zamburger^{1}. Eka Hospital^{2}
Putra Delta Sidoarjo	(Indonesia) Didik Ludianto	(Indonesia) Ferry Aman Saragih	(Indonesia) Oliver	HappiArena^{1} ^{3}
Semen Padang	(Indonesia) Delfri Adri	(Indonesia) Sílvio Escobar	(Indonesia) XTen	Semen Padang^{1} ^{3}, Livin' by Mandiri^{1}, Bank Mandiri^{1}, Pertamax Turbo^{1}, Taspen^{2}
Sriwijaya	(Indonesia) Liestiadi	(Indonesia) Amirul Mukminin	(Indonesia) Tweve	Bukit Asam^{1}, Bara Coal^{1}
Sulut United	(Indonesia) Jaya Hartono	(Indonesia) Mahadirga Lasut	(Indonesia) Mills	Minahasa Cahaya Lestari^{1}

Notes:

1. On the front of shirt.
2. On the back of shirt.
3. On the sleeves.
4. On the shorts.
5. Apparel made by club.

=== Coaching changes ===
Team	Outgoing head coach	Manner of departure	Date of vacancy	Week	Table	Replaced by	Date of appointment
PSDS	(Indonesia) Syahrial Effendi	Resigned	11 September 2022	3	9 in West Region	(Indonesia) Susanto	11 September 2022
PSIM	(Indonesia) Imran Nahumarury	Sacked	13 September 2022	3	6 in Central Region	(Indonesia) Dwi Priyo Utomo (caretaker)	13 September 2022
Persekat	(Indonesia) Erwan Hendarwanto	Resigned	13 September 2022	3	8 in Central Region	(Indonesia) Agus Supriyanto (caretaker)	15 September 2022
PSIM	(Indonesia) Dwi Priyo Utomo (caretaker)	End of caretaker spell	21 September 2022	4	10 in Central Region	(Indonesia) Erwan Hendarwanto	21 September 2022
Gresik United	(Indonesia) Khusairi	Resigned	20 September 2022	5	10 in Central Region		
PSPS	(Indonesia) Yusup Prasetiyo	Sacked	23 September 2022	4	9 in West Region	(Indonesia) Riswandi (caretaker)	23 September 2022
Persela	(Indonesia) Fakhri Husaini	Sacked	28 September 2022	6	9 in Central Region		

== First round ==
=== West Region ===
Pos	Team	Pld	W	D	L	GF	GA	GD	Pts	Qualification or relegation	MED	KAR	SRI	SPD	PRJ	PKC	SER	PDS	RIA
1	PSMS	6	5	1	0	11	4	+7	16	Advance to the second round	—	1–0	2–1	1–0					
2	Karo United	5	4	0	1	6	1	+5	12	Advance to the second round		—					3–0	1–0	
3	Sriwijaya	6	3	2	1	7	4	+3	11				—	2–2	2–0		1–0		
4	Semen Padang	6	2	3	1	12	5	+7	9 (Note: Head-to-head results: Semen Padang 3–0 Persiraja.)					—	3–0		5–0		
5	Persiraja	6	3	0	3	5	10	−5	9		0–3 (Note: PSMS were awarded a 3–0 win over Persiraja by the PSSI and LIB's Competition Ad-hoc Committee due to the negligence by the latter match committee which caused the lighting in the stadium to suddenly go out 6 minutes before the scheduled kick-off time and spark the audiences anger which afterward led to the supporters riot.)				—	2–1	1–0		2–1
6	PSKC	6	2	1	3	4	5	−1	7		0–0	0–1	0–1			—		2–1	
7	Perserang	7	2	0	5	3	12	−9	6	Possible Relegation to Liga 3						0–1	—	2–1	1–0
8	PSDS	6	1	2	3	5	7	−2	5	Relegation to Liga 3			0–0	1–1				—	2–1
9	PSPS	6	0	1	5	6	11	−5	1	Relegation to Liga 3	3–4	0–1		1–1					—

Updated to match(es) played on 1 October 2022. Source: Liga 2 2022–23
Legend: Blue = home team win; Yellow = draw; Red = away team win.
Rules for classification: 1) Points; 2) Head-to-head; 3) Goal difference; 4) Goals scored; 5) Discipline point; 6) Drawing.

=== Central Region ===
Pos	Team	Pld	W	D	L	GF	GA	GD	Pts	Qualification or relegation	BEK	PJP	GUN	CLP	PAT	YOG	PKB	PSL	KAT	NUN
1	Bekasi City	7	5	1	1	10	3	+7	16	Advance to the second round	—		1–0			3–0		2–1		2–0
2	Persijap	7	3	3	1	9	7	+2	12	Advance to the second round	1–0	—						2–2	1–0	0–1
3	Gresik United	7	2	4	1	6	3	+3	10 (Note: Tied on Head-to-head results. Goal difference: Gresik United +3, PSCS +1.)				—		2–0	2–0	0–0			
4	PSCS	7	2	4	1	6	5	+1	10			2–3	0–0	—	1–1					
5	Persipa	7	2	3	2	9	9	0	9		1–1	2–2			—		2–0			
6	PSIM	7	2	3	2	6	8	−2	9					1–1		—		1–0	3–1	
7	Persikab	7	1	4	2	4	6	−2	7			0–0		0–1		1–1	—			
8	Persela	7	1	3	3	11	13	−2	6 (Note: Tied on Head-to-head results. Goal difference: Persela –2, Persekat –3.)	Possible Relegation to Liga 3			2–2		2–1		2–3	—		
9	Persekat	7	1	3	3	4	7	−3	6	Relegation to Liga 3	0–1		0–0	0–0				2–2	—	1–0
10	Nusantara United	7	1	2	4	2	6	−4	5	Relegation to Liga 3				0–1	1–2	0–0	0–0			—

Updated to match(es) played on 1 October 2022. Source: Liga 2 2022–23
Legend: Blue = home team win; Yellow = draw; Red = away team win.
Rules for classification: 1) Points; 2) Head-to-head; 3) Goal difference; 4) Goals scored; 5) Discipline point; 6) Drawing.

=== East Region ===
Pos	Team	Pld	W	D	L	GF	GA	GD	Pts	Qualification or relegation	PPR	PBA	PAL	DEL	PWR	SUL	PDS	BIA	KTP
1	Persipura	6	3	2	1	9	4	+5	11	Advance to the second round	—			1–0			1–1		4–0
2	Persiba	6	3	1	2	12	7	+5	10 (Note: Tied on head-to-head results. Goal difference: Persiba +5, Persipal BU +2.)	Advance to the second round	2–1	—		3–1					5–0
3	Persipal BU	6	2	4	0	4	2	+2	10			0–0	—			1–0	0–0	2–1	
4	Deltras	6	3	0	3	12	7	+5	9					—	3–1		3–1		5–0
5	Persewar	7	2	3	2	11	9	+2	9		0–0		1–1		—		4–1		3–1
6	Sulut United	5	3	0	2	7	5	+2	9		1–2	2–0			3–2	—		1–0	
7	Putra Delta Sidoarjo	6	2	2	2	9	10	−1	8	Possible Relegation to Liga 3		3–2					—	3–0	
8	PSBS	5	1	1	3	2	6	−4	4	Relegation to Liga 3				1–0	0–0			—	
9	Kalteng Putra	5	0	1	4	1	17	−16	1	Relegation to Liga 3			0–0						—

Updated to match(es) played on 1 October 2022. Source: Liga 2 2022–23
Legend: Blue = home team win; Yellow = draw; Red = away team win.
Rules for classification: 1) Points; 2) Head-to-head; 3) Goal difference; 4) Goals scored; 5) Discipline point; 6) Drawing.

=== Ranking possible relegation ===
Since the Central Region contains 10 teams, the results against the 10th place do not count.

Pos	Team	Pld	W	D	L	GF	GA	GD	Pts	Qualification or relegation
1	Team 1	0	0	0	0	0	0	0	0	
2	Team 2	0	0	0	0	0	0	0	0	Relegation to Liga 3
3	Team 3	0	0	0	0	0	0	0	0	Relegation to Liga 3

First match(es) will be played: 28 August 2022. Source: Liga 2 2022–23
Rules for classification: 1) Points; 2) Goal difference; 3) Goals scored; 4) Discipline point; 5) Drawing.

== Second round ==
In this round, competing teams will be divided into two groups of three teams (groups X to Y). Teams in each group played one another in a double round-robin.

=== Group X ===
Pos	Team	Pld	W	D	L	GF	GA	GD	Pts	Qualification
1	Team 1	0	0	0	0	0	0	0	0	Advance to the Final and Promotion to Liga 1
2	Team 2	0	0	0	0	0	0	0	0	Advance to the Third place
3	Team 3	0	0	0	0	0	0	0	0	

First match(es) will be played: TBD. Source: Liga 2 2022–23

=== Group Y ===
Pos	Team	Pld	W	D	L	GF	GA	GD	Pts	Qualification
1	Team 1	0	0	0	0	0	0	0	0	Advance to the Final and promotion to Liga 1
2	Team 2	0	0	0	0	0	0	0	0	Advance to the Third place
3	Team 3	0	0	0	0	0	0	0	0	

First match(es) will be played: TBD. Source: Liga 2 2022–23

== Knockout round ==
Final
Winner Group X
Winner Group Y
Third place
Runner-up Group X
Runner-up Group Y

== Season statistics ==
=== Top goalscorers ===
As of matches played on 1 October 2022.

Rank	Player	Team	Goals
1	(Indonesia) Zulham Zamrun	Persela	6
2	(Indonesia) Eksel Runtukahu	Sulut United	5
3	(Indonesia) I Nyoman Sukarja	PSKC	4
3	(Indonesia) Sílvio Escobar	Semen Padang	4
3	(Indonesia) Riski Novriansyah	Persipa Pati	4
6	9 players		3

=== Discipline ===
As of matches played on 19 September 2022.

- Most yellow card(s): 4
  - (Indonesia) Yericho Christiantoko (Persekat)
- Most red card(s): 1
  - (Indonesia) Marcel Yusuf Usemahu (Deltras)
  - (Indonesia) Sandy Ferizal (Persela)
  - (Indonesia) Sugiyanto (Perserang)
  - (Indonesia) Imanuel Rumbiak (Persewar)
  - (Indonesia) Andre Putra Wibowo (Persijap)
  - (Indonesia) Munhar (PSPS)
  - (Indonesia) Patrison Lucky Rumere (PSBS)
  - (Indonesia) Susanto (Perserang)
  - (Indonesia) Ahmad Amin Agusti (PSKC)
  - (Indonesia) Ahmad Burhan Afiludin (Persikab)

=== Hat-tricks ===
Player	For	Against	Result	Date
(Indonesia) Ahmad Ihwan	PSMS	PSPS	4–3 (A)	22 September 2022

== Attendances ==
Pos	Team	Total	High	Low	Average	Change
1	Persijap	33,733	8,543	8,500	8,433	n/a
2	Persipura	29,107	10,876	8,200	9,702	n/a
3	Persiraja	24,886	8,136	5,302	6,221	n/a
4	PSIM	24,348	12,563	11,785	12,174	n/a
5	PSMS	21,925	8,275	6,800	7,308	n/a
6	Persewar	20,538	14,013	1,021	5,134	n/a
7	Semen Padang	18,537	10,780	7,757	9,268	n/a
8	Persekat	16,768	4,391	2,871	3,354	n/a
9	Persiba	13,362	6,200	3,200	4,454	n/a
10	PSDS	11,074	4,026	3,448	3,691	n/a
11	Persipa	10,400	4,100	2,600	3,467	n/a
12	PSPS	9,719	4,946	4,773	4,859	n/a
13	Gresik United	9,713	4,223	2,582	3,238	n/a
14	Persela	9,316	4,574	1,574	3,105	n/a
15	PSCS	8,782	3,552	1,719	2,927	n/a
16	Persipal BU	7,537	4,257	3,280	3,768	n/a
17	Sulut United	7,130	3,109	1,045	1,782	n/a
18	Persikab	6,325	2,665	1,386	2,308	n/a
19	Bekasi City	6,249	2,877	1,472	2,083	n/a
20	Deltras	5,456	2,370	1,171	1,819	n/a
21	Perserang	5,375	2,352	1,251	1,791	n/a
22	PSBS	5,244	3,125	2,119	2,662	n/a
23	Kalteng Putra	5,150	5,150	5,150	5,150	n/a
24	Sriwijaya	4,704	1,603	1,600	1,568	n/a
25	Karo United	1,602	833	769	801	n/a
26	PSKC	841	267	235	210	n/a
27	Putra Delta Sidoarjo	200	100	100	100	n/a
28	Nusantara United	138	86	52	34	n/a
	League total	318,059	14,013	52	3,614	n/a

Updated to games played on 1 October 2022
Source: Liga 2 2022–23

== See also ==
- 2022–23 Liga 1
- 2022–23 Liga 3
- 2022–23 Piala Indonesia
