= Bramntio Ramadhan =

Indonesian footballer

Personal information
- Full name: Bramntio Ramadhan Heriansyah
- Date of birth: 17 November 2001 (age 24)
- Place of birth: Probolinggo, Indonesia
- Height: 1.73 m (5 ft 8 in)
- Position: Forward

Youth career
- 2018–2020: Arema

Senior career*
Years	Team	Apps	(Gls)
2021–2023	Arema	6	(0)
2022	→ Deltras (loan)	1	(0)
2023	PSCS Cilacap	1	(0)
- * Club domestic league appearances and goals as of 30 September 2023

Bramntio Ramadhan Heriansyah (born 17 November 2001) is an Indonesian professional footballer who plays as a forward.

== Club career ==
=== Arema ===
He was signed for Arema to play in Liga 1 in the 2021 season. Bramntio made his first-team debut on 3 October 2021 as a substitute in a match against Persela Lamongan at the Gelora Bung Karno Madya Stadium, Jakarta. He scored his first goal on 7 June 2022 in friendly match against RANS Nusantara at Kanjuruhan Stadium.

==== Deltras (loan) ====
On 2 August 2022, Bramntio joined Liga 2 club Deltras on loan.

== Career statistics ==
=== Club ===
As of 30 September 2023

Club	Season	League			Cup		Continental		Other (Note: Appearances in Indonesia President's Cup.)		Total	
Club	Season	Division	Apps	Goals	Apps	Goals	Apps	Goals	Apps	Goals	Apps	Goals
Arema	2021–22	Liga 1	6	0	0	0	—		0	0	6	0
Arema	2022–23	Liga 1	0	0	0	0	—		1	0	1	0
Arema	Total		6	0	0	0	—		1	0	7	0
Deltras (loan)	2022–23	Liga 2	1	0	0	0	—		0	0	1	0
PSCS Cilacap	2023–24	Liga 2	1	0	0	0	—		0	0	1	0
Career total			8	0	0	0	0	0	1	0	9	0

== Honours ==
=== Club ===
Arema

- Indonesia President's Cup: 2022
