= Didik Ariyanto =

Indonesian footballer (born 1991)

Personal information
- Full name: Didik Ariyanto
- Date of birth: 12 July 1991 (age 35)
- Place of birth: Surabaya, Indonesia
- Height: 1.74 m (5 ft 9 in)
- Positions: Left-back; left winger

Senior career*
Years	Team	Apps	(Gls)
2014	Perseta Tulungagung	1	(0)
2015–2017	Perssu Sumenep	15	(5)
2017	Persewangi Banyuwangi	9	(0)
2018	Bandung United	5	(0)
2019	Perserang Serang	20	(2)
2020	PSCS Cilacap	0	(0)
2021–2022	Arema	2	(0)
2022	PSMS Medan	5	(1)
2023–2024	Persikab Bandung	11	(0)
2024–2025	RANS Nusantara	11	(0)
- * Club domestic league appearances and goals as of 5 February 2025

Didik Ariyanto (born 12 July 1991) is an Indonesian professional footballer who plays as a left-back or left winger.

== Club career ==
=== Arema ===
He was signed for Arema to play in Liga 1 in the 2021 season. Didik made his first-team debut on 5 January 2022 as a substitute in a match against Persikabo 1973.

=== PSMS Medan ===
Didik was signed for PSMS Medan to play in Liga 2 in the 2022–23 season. He made his league debut on 30 August 2022 in a match against PSKC Cimahi at the Si Jalak Harupat Stadium, Soreang.
