= Galih Firmansyah =

Indonesian footballer

Personal information
- Full name: Galih Firmansyah
- Date of birth: 22 March 1986 (age 40)
- Place of birth: Malang, East Java, Indonesia
- Height: 1.80 m (5 ft 11 in)
- Position: Goalkeeper

Team information
- Current team: Arema (assistant goalkeeper coach)

Senior career*
Years	Team	Apps	(Gls)
2006	Arema Malang		
2007	Persibo Bojonegoro		
2008–2012	Persiwa Wamena	58	(1)
2013	Persepam Madura Utama	8	(0)
2015	Persela Lamongan	0	(0)
2017	PS Timah Babel	6	(0)
2018–2020	Perserang Serang	16	(0)
2023	Arema	0	(0)
Total		88	(1)

Managerial career
- 2021–2022: NZR Sumbersari (goalkeeper coach)
- 2023–: Arema (assistant goalkeeper coach)
- * Club domestic league appearances and goals

Galih Firmansyah (born 22 March 1986 in Malang, East Java, Indonesia) is an Indonesian former footballer.

== Club career ==
=== Perserang Serang ===
He was signed for Perserang Serang to play in Liga 2 in the 2018 season.

== Honours ==
Persibo Bojonegoro

- Liga Indonesia First Division: 2007
