= Yusup Prasetiyo =

Indonesian football manager (born 1990)

Personal information
- Full name: Muhamad Yusup Prasetiyo
- Date of birth: 21 June 1990 (age 36)
- Place of birth: South Tangerang, Indonesia

Team information
- Current team: Persija Jakarta (head of youth development)

Youth career
- Persita Tangerang

International career
Years	Team	Apps	(Gls)
2005	Indonesia U17		

Managerial career
- 2016: Celebest (assistant)
- 2017: Yunnan Flying Tigers Youth
- 2018: PSMS Medan (assistant)
- 2019: PSIM Yogyakarta (assistant)
- 2020: Barito Putera (assistant)
- 2021–2022: Kelantan (assistant)
- 2022: PSPS Riau
- 2023: Sriwijaya
- 2024: Sumut United
- 2026–: Persija Jakarta (head of youth development)

Muhamad Yusup Prasetiyo (born 21 June 1990) is an Indonesian professional football coach who is currently the head of youth development of Persija Jakarta.

== Early life ==
Prasetiyo was born on 21 June 1990 in South Tangerang, Indonesia and is of Betawi ethnicity. As a youth player, he joined the youth academy of Persita Tangerang and played for the Indonesia national under-17 football team in 2005. After retiring from playing football, he attended the Faculty of Tarbiyah and Teacher Training in Indonesia, where he studied Indonesian language education.

== Managerial career ==
Prasetiyo obtained his AFC A Coaching License and started his managerial career as an assistant manager of Indonesian side Celebest FC, before being appointed as a youth manager of Chinese side Yunnan Flying Tigers FC in 2017. One year later, he was appointed as an assistant manager of Indonesian side PSMS Medan. Ahead of the 2019 season, he was appointed as an assistant manager of Indonesian side PSIM Yogyakarta.

In 2020, he was appointed as an assistant manager of Indonesian side PS Barito Putera. Subsequently, he was appointed as an assistant manager of Malaysian side Kelantan FC in 2021. His first role as head coach came after he was appointed manager of Indonesian side PSPS Riau in 2022. Midway through 2023, he was appointed manager of Indonesian side Sriwijaya FC. Following his stint there, he was appointed manager of Indonesian side Sumut United FC.
