= 2022–23 Piala Indonesia =

Tournament details
- Country: Indonesia
- Dates: Cancelled
- Teams: 64

Final positions
- Champions: None

The 2022–23 Piala Indonesia was intended as the ninth edition of the Piala Indonesia football tournament but the impact of COVID-19 pandemic in Indonesia and the Kanjuruhan Stadium disaster made it difficult to stage the event. The tournament was scheduled to be held between August 2022 and March 2023. 64 clubs, from Liga 1, Liga 2, and Liga 3, entered the competition as announced in July 2022.

PSM were unable to defend their 2019 title.

PSSI initially cancelled the event based on the impact of the COVID-19 Pandemic but reconsidered its position by attempting to find sponsorship due to the costs involved. That did not materialise and the Kanjuruhan Stadium disaster made it too complicated to stage.

== Calendar ==
Round	Date	Matches	Clubs	New entries this round
First round	TBA	32	64 → 32	18 2022–23 Liga 1 clubs 28 2022–23 Liga 2 clubs 18 Liga 3 clubs
Second round	TBA	16	32 → 16	None
Third round	TBA	8	16 → 8	None
Quarter-finals	TBA	4	8 → 4	None
Semi-finals	TBA	2	4 → 2	None
Final	TBA	1	2 → 1	None
Total				64 clubs

== Participating clubs ==
The following 64 clubs were expected to participate for the competition.

League	Teams	
Liga 1 (2022–23 season)	Arema; Bali United; Bhayangkara; Borneo; Dewa United; Madura United; Persebaya; Persib; Persija; Persik; Persikabo 1973; Persis; Persita; PS Barito Putera; PSIS; PSM; PSS; RANS Nusantara	
Liga 2 (2022–23 season)	Bekasi City; Deltras; Gresik United; Kalteng Putra; Karo United; Nusantara United; Persekat; Persela; Perserang; Persewar; Persiba; Persijap; Persikab; Persipa; Persipal BU; Persipura; Persiraja; PSBS; PSCS; PSDS; PSIM; PSKC; PSMS; PSPS Riau; Putra Delta Sidoarjo; Semen Padang; Sriwijaya; Sulut United	
Liga 3
Liga 3	Relegated from 2021–22 Liga 2	Badak Lampung; Hizbul Wathan; KS Tiga Naga; PS Mitra Kukar
Liga 3	2021–22 Liga 3 National round	Bandung United; Batulicin Putra 69; Farmel; Persipasi; Persak; Persebi; Persedikab; Persida; Persidago; Persikota; PS Palembang; PS Siak; PSGC; Serpong City

== See also ==
- 2022–23 Liga 1
- 2022–23 Liga 2
- 2022–23 Liga 3
