= Ikhwan Ciptady =

Indonesian association football player

Personal information
- Full name: Ikhwan Ciptady Muhammad
- Date of birth: 22 March 1994 (age 32)
- Place of birth: Jakarta, Indonesia
- Height: 1.82 m (6 ft 0 in)
- Position: Centre-back

Youth career
- 2012–2013: Pelita Jaya
- 2013–2015: Pelita Bandung Raya
- 2015–2016: PON DKI Jakarta

Senior career*
Years	Team	Apps	(Gls)
2017–2018	Persis Solo	43	(1)
2018–2020	PSS Sleman	25	(0)
2020–2021	TIRA-Persikabo	2	(0)
2021	Arema	0	(0)
2021	Sriwijaya	12	(1)
2022	Persija Jakarta	8	(1)
2022	Persis Solo	0	(0)
2022	Bekasi City	5	(0)
2023–2025	Persela Lamongan	20	(0)
- * Club domestic league appearances and goals as of 7 October 2024

Ikhwan Ciptady Muhammad (born 22 March 1994), is an Indonesian professional footballer who plays as a centre-back.

== Honours ==
=== Club ===
PSS Sleman

- Liga 2: 2018
