= Muhammad Faiz (footballer) =

Indonesian footballer

Personal information
- Full name: Muhammad Faiz Iqbal Fardhani
- Date of birth: 11 January 2002 (age 24)
- Place of birth: Malang, Indonesia
- Height: 1.75 m (5 ft 9 in)
- Position: Midfielder

Youth career
- 2017–2018: Persema Malang
- 2019–2021: Arema

Senior career*
Years	Team	Apps	(Gls)
2021–2023	Arema	2	(0)
2022	→ Deltras (loan)	1	(0)
2023	Persijap Jepara	1	(0)
- * Club domestic league appearances and goals as of 10 September 2023

Muhammad Faiz Iqbal Fardhani (born 11 January 2002) is an Indonesian professional footballer who plays as a midfielder.

== Club career ==
=== Arema ===
He was signed for Arema to play in Liga 1 in the 2021 season. Faiz made his first-team debut on 23 November 2021 as a substitute in a match against Barito Putera.

==== Deltras (loan) ====
On 2 August 2022, Faiz joined Liga 2 club Deltras on loan.

== Career statistics ==
=== Club ===
As of 10 September 2023

Club	Season	League		Cup		Continental		Other		Total	
Club	Season	Apps	Goals	Apps	Goals	Apps	Goals	Apps	Goals	Apps	Goals
Arema	2021–22	2	0	0	0	—		0	0	2	0
Arema	2022–23	0	0	0	0	—		0	0	0	0
Arema	Total	2	0	0	0	—		0	0	2	0
Deltras (loan)	2022–23	1	0	0	0	—		0	0	1	0
Persijap Jepara	2023–24	1	0	0	0	—		0	0	1	0
Career total		4	0	0	0	0	0	0	0	4	0

== Honours ==
=== Club ===
Arema

- Indonesia President's Cup: 2022
