= Joko Susilo =

Indonesian footballer

Personal information
- Full name: Joko Susilo
- Date of birth: 10 January 1996 (age 30)
- Place of birth: Pasuruan, Indonesia
- Height: 1.80 m (5 ft 11 in)
- Position: Defender

Team information
- Current team: Persekabpas Pasuruan

Youth career
- 2015–2016: Persekap Pasuruan
- 2016–2017: Persikabo 1973

Senior career*
Years	Team	Apps	(Gls)
2017–2019	Persikabo 1973	7	(0)
2019–2020	Persis Solo	8	(0)
2021–2023	PSMS Medan	14	(1)
2023	Arema	9	(1)
2023–2024	PSMS Medan	14	(0)
2025–2026	Persekat Tegal	8	(0)
2026	Sriwijaya	8	(0)
2026–	Persekabpas Pasuruan	0	(0)
- * Club domestic league appearances and goals as of 2 May 2026 (UTC)

Joko Susilo (born 10 January 1996) is an Indonesian professional footballer who plays as a defender for Liga Nusantara club Persekabpas Pasuruan.

== Club career ==
=== PSMS Medan ===
Joko signed a contract with Liga 2 club PSMS Medan. Joko made his league debut on 7 October 2021 in a match against KS Tiga Naga at the Gelora Sriwijaya Stadium. He scored his first league goal for the club a week later, scoring the first goal in a 2–2 draw over Semen Padang. He made eight league appearances for PSMS Medan during the 2021 season, scoring one goal.

In his second season at PSMS, Joko only went on to make 5 appearances, because Liga 2 was suspended due to a tragedy.

=== Arema ===
On 21 January 2023, Joko joined a Liga 1 club Arema. Joko made his league debut on 12 February 2023 as a substitute in a match against Persija Jakarta at the Patriot Stadium, Bekasi. On 7 April, Joko scored his first league goal for Arema in a 1–1 draw over Madura United at Gelora Ratu Pamelingan Stadium.
