= Imanuel Rumbiak =

Indonesian footballer

Personal information
- Full name: Imanuel Rumbiak
- Date of birth: November 26, 1998 (age 27)
- Place of birth: Timika, Indonesia
- Height: 1.67 m (5 ft 6 in)
- Position: Full-back

Youth career
- SSB Mimika United
- 2016–2017: PPLP Papua

Senior career*
Years	Team	Apps	(Gls)
2017	Persewar Waropen	2	(0)
2018	Persemi Mimika	7	(0)
2019	Barito Putera	0	(0)
2020–2021	Persipura Jayapura	2	(0)
2022–2023	Persewar Waropen	2	(0)
- * Club domestic league appearances and goals

Imanuel Rumbiak (born November 26, 1998) is an Indonesian professional footballer who plays as a full-back.

== Club career ==
=== Barito Putera ===
In 2019, Rumbiak signed a contract with Indonesian Liga 1 club Barito Putera.

=== Persipura Jayapura ===
He was signed for Persipura Jayapura to play in Liga 1 in the 2020 season. This season was suspended on 27 March 2020 due to the COVID-19 pandemic. The season was abandoned and was declared void on 20 January 2021.

== Personal life ==
Born in Indonesia, Rumbiak is of Polish descent.
