= Hamzah Titofani =

Indonesian footballer

Personal information
- Full name: Hamzah Titofani Rivaldi
- Date of birth: 10 August 2002 (age 24)
- Place of birth: Malang, Indonesia
- Height: 1.65 m (5 ft 5 in)
- Position: Winger

Team information
- Current team: Arema
- Number: 13

Youth career
- SSB Sempalwadak
- 2015–2020: Arema

Senior career*
Years	Team	Apps	(Gls)
2021–	Arema	54	(1)
2023–2024	→ Sada Sumut (loan)	17	(2)
2025–2026	→ Deltras (loan)	23	(7)
- * Club domestic league appearances and goals as of 6 November 2026

Hamzah Titofani Rivaldi (born 10 August 2002) is an Indonesian professional footballer who plays as a winger for Super League club Arema.

== Club career ==
=== Arema ===
He was signed for Arema to play in Liga 1 in the 2021 season. Tito made his first-team debut on 5 September 2021 as a substitute in a match against PSM Makassar at the Pakansari Stadium, Cibinong.

==== Sada Sumut (loan) ====
On 11 July 2023, Tito joined Liga 2 club Sada Sumut on loan.

== Career statistics ==
=== Club ===
As of 6 November 2026

Club	Season	League			Cup		League cup		Continental		Other (Note: Appearances in Piala Presiden)		Total	
Club	Season	Division	Apps	Goals	Apps	Goals	Apps	Goals	Apps	Goals	Apps	Goals	Apps	Goals
Arema	2021–22	Liga 1	19	0	0	0	0	0	—		0	0	19	0
Arema	2022–23	Liga 1	17	0	0	0	0	0	—		0	0	17	0
Arema	2023–24	Liga 1	0	0	0	0	0	0	—		0	0	0	0
Arema	2024–25	Liga 1	16	1	0	0	0	0	—		0	0	16	1
Arema	2025–26	Super League	0	0	0	0	0	0	—		0	0	0	0
Arema	2026–27	Super League	2	0	0	0	1	0	—		2	0	5	0
Arema	Total		54	1	0	0	1	0	—		2	0	57	1
Sada Sumut (loan)	2023–24	Liga 2	17	2	0	0	0	0	—		0	0	17	2
Deltras (loan)	2025–26	Championship	23	7	0	0	0	0	—		0	0	23	7
Career total			94	10	0	0	1	0	0	0	2	0	97	10

== Honours ==
Arema

- Piala Presiden: 2022, 2024
