= Sérgio Silva (Portuguese footballer) =

Portuguese footballer

Personal information
- Full name: Sérgio Domingos Reis Silva
- Date of birth: 26 February 1994 (age 32)
- Place of birth: Oliveira de Azeméis, Portugal
- Height: 1.88 m (6 ft 2 in)
- Position: Centre-back

Team information
- Current team: Gondomar
- Number: 4

Youth career
- 2008–2013: Oliveirense

Senior career*
| Years | Team | Apps | (Gls) |
| 2013–2020 | Oliveirense | 171 | (5) |
| 2020–2021 | Feirense | 5 | (1) |
| 2021–2023 | Arema | 62 | (2) |
| 2023– | Gondomar | 37 | (1) |
- * Club domestic league appearances and goals as of 13 April 2025

Sérgio Domingos Reis Silva (born 26 February 1994) is a Portuguese professional footballer who plays as a centre-back for Campeonato de Portugal club Gondomar.

== Club career ==
=== Portugal ===
On 27 July 2013, Silva made his professional debut with Oliveirense in a 2013–14 Taça da Liga match against Moreirense, when he started and played the full game. In the first match of the 2013–14 Segunda Liga season against Penafiel on the 11 August, he made his league debut.

=== Indonesia ===
On 22 August 2021, Silva signed a one-year contract with Indonesian Liga 1 club Arema on a free transfer. Sérgio made his league debut in a 1–1 draw against PSM Makassar on 5 September 2021 as a substitute for Dedik Setiawan in the 46th minute. He scored his first goal on 30 July 2022, which lead to the 2–1 victory against PSIS Semarang at Kanjuruhan Stadium.

== Honours ==
Arema

- Piala Presiden: 2022

Individual

- Liga 1 Team of the Season: 2021–22
