= Sandy Ferizal =

Indonesian association football player

Personal information
- Full name: Mochammad Sandy Ferizal
- Date of birth: 17 May 1999 (age 27)
- Place of birth: Malang, Indonesia
- Height: 1.78 m (5 ft 10 in)
- Position: Right-back

Youth career
- 2017–2019: Barito Putera

Senior career*
Years	Team	Apps	(Gls)
2018–2019	Barito Putera	3	(0)
2021	Arema	0	(0)
2021–2022	Persela Lamongan	29	(0)
2023–2024	PSM Makassar	1	(0)
2024–2025	PSIS Semarang	16	(1)
- * Club domestic league appearances and goals as of 9 May 2025

Mochammad Sandy Ferizal (born 17 May 1999) is an Indonesian professional footballer who plays as a right-back.

== Club career ==
=== Barito Putera ===
Ferizal made his professional debut in the Liga 1 for Barito Putera on 11 July 2018, in a 0–0 to Arema at the 17th May Stadium, Banjarmasin.

=== Arema ===
He was signed for Arema to play in 2021 Menpora Cup.

=== Persela Lamongan ===
He was signed for Persela Lamongan to play in Liga 1. Ferizal made his league debut on 17 September 2021 in a match against Persita Tangerang at the Pakansari Stadium, Cibinong.

=== PSIS Semarang ===
On 10 August 2024, he was signed for PSIS Semarang to play in 2024–25 Liga 1. Ferizal made his debut on 17 August 2024 in a match against Persis Solo at the Manahan Stadium, Surakarta. On 9 June 2025, Ferizal officially left PSIS Semarang.

== Career statistics ==
=== Club ===
As of 9 May 2025

Club	Season	League			Cup		Continental		Other		Total	
Club	Season	Division	Apps	Goals	Apps	Goals	Apps	Goals	Apps	Goals	Apps	Goals
Barito Putera	2018	Liga 1	3	0	0	0	–		0	0	3	0
Barito Putera	2019	Liga 1	0	0	0	0	–		0	0	0	0
Barito Putera	Total		3	0	0	0	0	0	0	0	3	0
Arema	2021	Liga 1	0	0	0	0	–		3 (Note: Appearances in Menpora Cup.)	0	3	0
Persela Lamongan	2021	Liga 1	23	0	0	0	–		0	0	23	0
Persela Lamongan	2022	Liga 2	6	0	0	0	–		0	0	6	0
Persela Lamongan	Total		29	0	0	0	0	0	0	0	29	0
PSM Makassar	2023–24	Liga 1	1	0	0	0	0	0	0	0	1	0
PSIS Semarang	2024–25	Liga 1	16	1	0	0	–		0	0	16	1
Career total			49	1	0	0	0	0	3	0	52	1
