= Ikhfanul Alam =

Indonesian footballer

Personal information
- Full name: Ikhfanul Alam
- Date of birth: 17 February 1992 (age 34)
- Place of birth: Malang, Indonesia
- Height: 1.78 m (5 ft 10 in)
- Positions: Centre-back; right-back

Team information
- Current team: Persipa Pati
- Number: 12

Youth career
- Arema
- Persikoba Batu
- Persekam Metro

Senior career*
Years	Team	Apps	(Gls)
2014–2015	Perserang Serang	8	(0)
2015–2016	Bhayangkara	6	(0)
2016–2017	Kalteng Putra	12	(0)
2017–2018	Persiba Balikpapan	8	(0)
2018–2019	PSIR Rembang	9	(0)
2019–2020	Arema	8	(0)
2020–2021	Badak Lampung	3	(0)
2021–2024	Arema	3	(0)
2023–2024	→ Persikab Bandung (loan)	8	(0)
2024–2025	Persiku Kudus	7	(0)
2025–	Persipa Pati	8	(0)
- * Club domestic league appearances and goals as of 11 January 2026

Ikhfanul Alam (born 17 February 1992 in Malang, Indonesia), is an Indonesian professional footballer for Liga Nusantara club Persipa Pati. He is also a Police Brigadier 1st Class in the Indonesian Police.

== Club career ==
=== Arema ===
On 16 January 2019, Alam signed a one-year contract with Arema on a free transfer, along with Sandy Firmansyah, Rachmat Latief. He made his league debut for Arema when he was part of the starting lineup of a 2019 Liga 1 match against Persipura Jayapura on 4 July 2019, in which Arema won.

=== Badak Lampung ===
In February 2020, Alam joined Liga 2 side Badak Lampung, he will wear jersey number 87, he never forgets number 87 which is the year Arema was founded. The jersey number was chosen at this time who have officially joined the team. He chose the number 87 jersey because of his love for the team nicknamed Singo Edan.

=== Return to Arema ===
On 3 March 2021, Alam decided to re-join Arema for the 2021–22 season. Family factors are a big consideration behind his career choice, he is currently also waiting for the birth of his first child.

== Honours ==
Arema

- Piala Presiden: 2019, 2022
