= Seiya Da Costa Lay =

Indonesian footballer

Seiya Da Costa
Personal information
- Full name: Seiya Da Costa Lay
- Date of birth: 30 September 2001 (age 25)
- Place of birth: Hiroshima, Japan
- Height: 1.77 m (5 ft 10 in)
- Position: Defensive midfielder

Youth career
- 2019–2020: Arema

Senior career*
Years	Team	Apps	(Gls)
2020–2023	Arema	2	(0)
- * Club domestic league appearances and goals as of 24 March 2023

Seiya Da Costa Lay (Japanese: セイヤダコスタレイ; born 30 September 2001) is an Indonesian professional footballer who plays as a defensive midfielder.

== Personal life ==
Born to Indonesian father, from East Nusa Tenggara, and Japanese mother, Da Costa lived in Japan before moving to Indonesia.

== Career ==
Da Costa was signed for Arema to play in Liga 1 in the 2021 season. Seiya made his debut on 11 December 2022 as a substitute in a match against Persis Solo at the Jatidiri Stadium, Semarang.

== Career statistics ==
As of 24 March 2023

Appearances and goals by club, season and competition
Club	Season	League			Cup		Continental		Other		Total	
Club	Season	Division	Apps	Goals	Apps	Goals	Apps	Goals	Apps	Goals	Apps	Goals
Arema	2021–22	Liga 1	0	0	0	0	—		0	0	0	0
Arema	2022–23	Liga 1	2	0	0	0	—		0	0	2	0
Arema	2023–24	Liga 1	0	0	0	0	—		0	0	0	0
Career total			2	0	0	0	0	0	0	0	2	0
