= Rizky Dwi Febrianto =

Indonesian footballer (born 1997)

Personal information
- Full name: Rizky Dwi Febrianto
- Date of birth: 22 February 1997 (age 29)
- Place of birth: Jember, Indonesia
- Height: 1.78 m (5 ft 10 in)
- Positions: Full-back; defensive midfielder

Team information
- Current team: Bali United
- Number: 16

Youth career
- 2014–2015: Jember United

Senior career*
Years	Team	Apps	(Gls)
2015	Persekabpas Pasuruan	0	(0)
2016	Persepam Pamekasan	10	(0)
2017–2018	Madura United	33	(1)
2019	Kalteng Putra	12	(0)
2020	Persela Lamongan	0	(0)
2020–2024	Arema	56	(6)
2023–2024	→ Borneo Samarinda (loan)	28	(1)
2024–2025	Persis Solo	24	(0)
2025–	Bali United	22	(0)

International career
2019	Indonesia U23	2	(1)
2021	Indonesia	1	(0)
Medal record
Men's football
Representing Indonesia
AFF Championship
Runner-up	2020 Singapore	Team
- * Club domestic league appearances and goals as of 22 May 2026

Rizky Dwi Febrianto (born 22 February 1997) is an Indonesian professional footballer who plays as a full-back or defensive midfielder for Super League club Bali United.

== Club career ==
=== Madura United ===
He made his professional debut in the Liga 1 on 16 April 2017 against Bali United. In a match against Arema on 14 May, he played the full 90 minutes for the first time in a 1–1 draw in gameweek 6. On 8 November, he scored his first league goal in a 1–3 lose against Bhayangkara, also picked up his first career red card. He made 22 league appearances and scored one goal with Madura United during the 2017 season. In the 2018 season, he only played 11 times and only once became a core player.

=== Kalteng Putra ===
In 2019 season, Rizky signed a contract with Kalteng Putra. He made his club debut on 16 May 2019 after replacing Kevin Gomes in the 77th minute, which ended 1–2 victory against PSIS Semarang. In next match, he initially started as a starter for the club in a match against Badak Lampung. In 2019 season, he only played 12 times and without scoring.

=== Arema ===
On 13 September 2020, Rizky was signed for Arema to play in the 2020 Liga 1. This season was suspended on 27 March 2020 due to the COVID-19 pandemic. The season was abandoned and was declared void on 20 January 2021. On 5 September 2021, he made his league debut in a 1–1 draw against PSM Makassar. On 1 November 2021, he scored his first goal for the club, scoring from the free-kick in the 89th minute, final result, Arema win 2–1 over Madura United in the 2021–22 Liga 1.

On 9 January 2022, Rizky scored the winning goal for the club, scoring a long range in a 1–0 win with Bhayangkara at Kompyang Sujana Stadium. On 1 February, Rizky provided an assist for Ridwan Tawainella in a 0–1 win over Persela Lamongan. On 24 March, he scored the opening goal for the club, scoring a free-kick in a 1–3 win over Persikabo 1973. During the 2021–22 season, he made 27 league appearances and scored 3 goals for Arema.

He scored the opening goal in a pre-season tournament 2022 Indonesia President's Cup semi-final of second leg in a 2–1 win against PSIS Semarang. On aggregate, Arema won 4–1 and reach to the 2022 President's Cup final. He won his first trophy with the club in July 2022, making first leg and second leg appearances in the Indonesia President's Cup final against Borneo Samarinda. On 24 July, Rizky starting his match for the new season in a 0–3 lose over Borneo Samarinda, however, he had picked up his red card towards the end of the match, which saw him miss the next two matches. He is set to return for two away matches after serving his red card suspension. Rizky returned to the first team and playing the full 90 minute in for the side on 13 August, in a 1–2 win over Bali United. On 17 September, Rizky provided an assist for Irsyad Maulana in a 1–0 away win over Persik Kediri. Rizky scored his first goal of the 2023–23 season on 7 December, scored a penalty shoot-out in a 0–2 away win over Dewa United.

On 19 March 2023, Rizky scored another penalty shoot-out in a 3–1 win over Persikabo 1973. On 1 April, Rizky scored the winning goal for the club against Persita Tangerang, successfully utilized the rebound ball from Aditya Harlan in the 88th minute.

== International career ==
Rizky made his international debut for Indonesia U-23 on 7 June 2019 against Thailand U-23 and he scoring against Philippines U-23 on 9 June 2019 at 2019 Merlion Cup.

Rizky made his official international debut for Indonesia national team on 15 December 2021, against Vietnam in a 2020 AFF Championship at a second half replace Asnawi Mangkualam.

== Others ==
Rizky was called up by Rahmad Darmawan to played for the Liga Indonesia All-Stars in the 2025 Piala Presiden where he scored in a 6–3 lost to EFL Championship club Oxford United on 6 July 2025.

== Career statistics ==
=== Club ===
As of match played 22 May 2026

Club	Season	League			Cup (Note: Includes Piala Indonesia)		Continental		Other (Note: Appearances in Piala Presiden)		Total	
Club	Season	Division	Apps	Goals	Apps	Goals	Apps	Goals	Apps	Goals	Apps	Goals
Persepam Pamekasan	2016	ISC B	10	0	0	0	—		0	0	10	0
Madura United	2017	Liga 1	22	1	0	0	—		3	0	25	1
Madura United	2018	Liga 1	11	0	0	0	—		1	0	12	0
Madura United	Total		33	1	0	0	—		4	0	37	1
Kalteng Putra	2019	Liga 1	12	0	0	0	—		5	0	17	0
Persela Lamongan	2020	Liga 1	0	0	0	0	—		0	0	0	0
Arema	2020	Liga 1	0	0	0	0	—		0	0	0	0
Arema	2021–22	Liga 1	27	3	0	0	—		3 (Note: Appearances in Menpora Cup)	0	30	3
Arema	2022–23	Liga 1	29	3	0	0	—		7	1	36	4
Arema	Total		56	6	0	0	—		10	1	66	7
Borneo Samarinda (loan)	2023–24	Liga 1	28	1	0	0	—		0	0	28	1
Persis Solo	2024–25	Liga 1	24	0	0	0	—		0	0	24	0
Bali United	2025–26	Super League	22	0	0	0	–		0	0	22	0
Career total			185	8	0	0	0	0	19	1	204	9

=== International appearances ===
As of match played 15 December 2021

Appearances and goals by national team and year
National team	Year	Apps	Goals
Indonesia	2021	1	0
Total		1	0

=== International goals ===
International under-23 goals

Goal	Date	Venue	Opponent	Score	Result	Competition
1	9 June 2019	Jalan Besar Stadium, Kallang, Singapore	Philippines	2–0	5–0	2019 Merlion Cup

== Honours ==
=== Club ===
Arema

- Piala Presiden: 2022

=== International ===
Indonesia

- AFF Championship runner-up: 2020
