= Achmad Figo =

Indonesian footballer

Personal information
- Full name: Achmad Figo Ramadani
- Date of birth: 25 December 2001 (age 24)
- Place of birth: Malang, Indonesia
- Height: 1.85 m (6 ft 1 in)
- Position: Defender

Team information
- Current team: Borneo Samarinda
- Number: 87

Youth career
- 2015–2018: Persema Malang
- 2019–2020: Arema

Senior career*
Years	Team	Apps	(Gls)
2021–2026	Arema	32	(0)
2024–2025	→ PSS Sleman (loan)	23	(0)
2025–2026	→ Deltras (loan)	6	(0)
2026–	Borneo Samarinda	0	(0)

International career
2022	Indonesia	2	(0)
- * Club domestic league appearances and goals as of 19 April 2026

Achmad Figo Ramadani (born 25 December 2001) is an Indonesian professional footballer who plays as a defender for Super League club Borneo Samarinda.

== Club career ==
=== Arema ===
He was signed for Arema to play in Liga 1 in the 2021 season. Figo made his first-team debut on 23 October 2021 as a substitute in a match against Persiraja Banda Aceh at the Maguwoharjo Stadium, Sleman.

== International career ==
In January 2022, Figo was called up to the senior team in a friendly match in Bali by Shin Tae-yong. He earned his first cap in a 4–1 win friendly match against Timor Leste on 27 January 2022.

== Career statistics ==
=== Club ===
As of 19 April 2026

Club	Season	League		Cup		Continental		Other (Note: Appearances in Piala Presiden)		Total	
Club	Season	Apps	Goals	Apps	Goals	Apps	Goals	Apps	Goals	Apps	Goals
Arema	2021–22	4	0	0	0	—		0	0	4	0
Arema	2022–23	16	0	0	0	—		2	0	18	0
Arema	2023–24	12	0	0	0	—		0	0	12	0
Arema	2025–26	0	0	0	0	—		1	0	1	0
Arema	Total	32	0	0	0	—		3	0	35	0
PSS Sleman (loan)	2024–25	23	0	0	0	—		0	0	23	0
Deltras (loan)	2025–26	6	0	0	0	—		0	0	6	0
Career total		61	0	0	0	0	0	3	0	64	0

=== International ===
As of match played 30 January 2022

Appearances and goals by national team and year
National team	Year	Apps	Goals
Indonesia	2022	2	0
Total		2	0

== Honours ==
Arema

- Piala Presiden: 2022
