= Eduardo Almeida =

Portuguese football manager

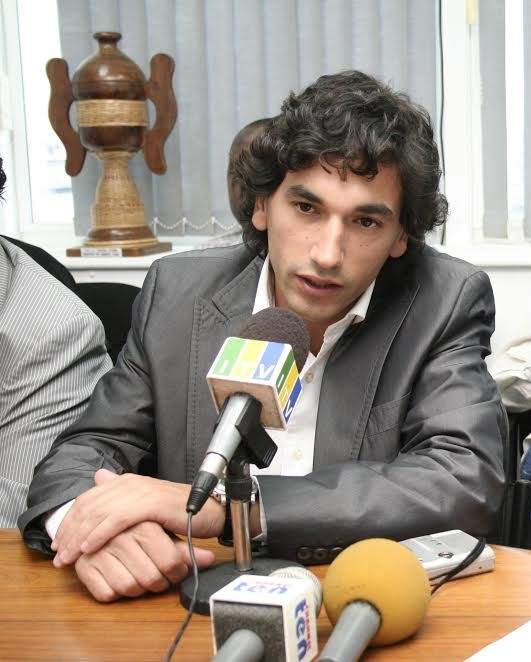
- Almeida in 2009

Personal information
- Full name: Eduardo Filipe Arroja Almeida
- Date of birth: 22 March 1978 (age 48)
- Place of birth: Lisbon, Portugal
- Height: 1.76 m (5 ft 9 in)

Team information
- Current team: Sukhothai (head coach)

Managerial career
- Years: Team
- 2001–2003: Benfica U16 (assistant)
- 2003–2004: Benfica U16
- 2004–2005: União Almeirim U19
- 2005–2007: Atlético do Cacém (assistant)
- 2007–2008: South China (assistant)
- 2008–2009: Atlético do Cacém
- 2009–2010: African Lyon
- 2010–2011: Real (assistant)
- 2011–2012: Naval (assistant)
- 2012–2013: A.S.C.
- 2013–2014: T-Team
- 2014: Kozármisleny
- 2014: African Lyon
- 2014–2015: Lanexang United
- 2015–2016: Pinhalnovense
- 2016: Angrense
- 2017–2018: Melaka United
- 2018–2019: Ubon United
- 2019–2020: Semen Padang
- 2021–2022: Arema
- 2023–2024: RANS Nusantara
- 2024–2025: Semen Padang
- 2026–: Sukhothai

Eduardo Filipe Arroja Almeida (born 22 March 1978) is a Portuguese football manager. He is currently the head coach of the Thai League 1 club, Sukhothai.

== Managerial career ==
Eduardo holds the UEFA Pro Licence, the highest football coaching qualification. He received the UEFA Pro Licence in 2011 from the Portuguese Football Federation. He also holds a degree in Sports and Physical Education from the Universidade Lusófona.

=== Portugal ===
He began his managerial career in 2001 as the assistant manager of the U-16 team of Portuguese club S.L. Benfica. He worked as an assistant to former Portuguese international, José Luís. Later in 2003 he was appointed as the head coach of the U-17 team of Benfica. In a four-year long spell, he worked at the grassroots level of the club and helped in the development of young footballers.

In 2004, he was appointed as the head coach of the U-19 team of Almeirim-based side, União Almeirim on a one-year contract.

He then moved to Agualva-Cacém in 2005 where he signed a two-year contract to be appointed as the assistant manager of Terceira Divisão side, Atlético Clube do Cacém where he worked as an assistant to Portuguese football manager Pedro Valido.

=== Hong Kong ===
He first moved out of Portugal in 2007 to Hong Kong where he was appointed as the Assistant Manager of Hong Kong First Division League side, South China AA. In his short spell in Hong Kong, he helped his side win the 2007–08 Hong Kong First Division League and the 2007–08 Hong Kong League Cup.

=== Back to Portugal ===
He moved back to Portugal in 2008 and was appointed as the manager of his former club, Atlético Cacém.

=== Tanzania ===
He again moved out of Portugal in 2009 to Tanzania where he was appointed as the manager of Tanzanian Premier League side, African Lyon F.C. He helped the Dar es Salaam-based side secure the 5th position in the 2009–10 season of the Tanzanian Premier League.

=== Back to Portugal ===
After a short spell in Tanzania, he moved back to Portugal in 2010 where he was appointed as the assistant manager of Portuguese Second Division side, Real S.C. where he worked as an assistant to Portuguese football manager Jorge Amaral Rodrigues.

He then moved to Figueira da Foz in 2011 where he was appointed as the assistant manager of Associação Naval 1º de Maio on a one-year contract. He worked as an assistant to former Brazilian international, Carlos Mozer.

In 2012, he moved to Reguengos de Monsaraz where he was appointed as the manager of Atlético S.C. on a one-year contract.

=== Malaysia ===
After a three year long spell in Portugal, he moved out to Malaysia where he signed a one-year contract to be appointed as the manager of Malaysia Super League side, T–Team F.C. He was appointed as a replacement for former West Ham United F.C. player, Peter Butler and was given the responsibility of avoiding relegation to the Malaysia Premier League.

=== Hungary ===
In December 2014, he moved out to Hungary where on 17 December, he was appointed as the manager of Kozármisleny-based Nemzeti Bajnokság II side, Kozármisleny SE on a short-term contract. He helped his side secure 13 points in 14 matches in a short-spell at the club, emerging victorious against Szolnoki MÁV FC, Várda SE and Hungarian club Békéscsaba 1912 Előre.

=== Back to Tanzania ===
He moved back to Tanzania and to his former club African Lyon in 2014.

=== Laos ===
In December 2014, he made a far away move to Laos where he was appointed as the manager of Lao Premier League side, Lanexang United F.C. In his short spell at the Vientiane-based side, he helped them secure the 2nd position in the 2015 Lao Premier League.

=== Back to Portugal ===
He moved back to Portugal in December 2015 and was appointed as the manager of Campeonato de Portugal side, C.D. Pinhalnovense on a one-year contract. He helped his side avoid relegation to Portuguese District Championships securing major wins against SR Almancilense and F.C. Barreirense. He parted company with the Pinhal Novo-based side without any loss and 2 wins in the 2016–17 Campeonato de Portugal.

He moved to Angra do Heroísmo in October 2016 where on 31 October he was appointed as the manager of another Campeonato de Portugal side, S.C. Angrense.

=== Back To Malaysia ===
June 2017 marks his return to Malaysia when he was appointed as the new head coach of Melaka United. Safe the team from relegation and renew contract, However, in May 2018 finish part away with club with mutual agreement.

=== Go to Thailand ===
In December 2018 sign a 2 years contract with Ubon United but left the team in May 2019 because team have financial problems.

=== Go to Indonesia ===
In September 2019 sign with Semen Padang in Liga 1. 2021 sign with Arema also in Liga 1. When managing Arema, he recorded 23 consecutive unbeaten matches in 2021–22 season. On 5 September 2022, he sacked from Arema due to lack of good performance after resulted 2−2−3 (2 win, 2 draw, 2 lose) in the league.

== Managerial statistics ==
As of match played 21 November 2026

Managerial record by team and tenure
Team	Nat.	From	To	Record					Ref.
Team	Nat.	From	To	G	W	D	L	Win %	Ref.
Atlético	(Portugal)	1 July 2012	11 March 2013	1	0	0	1	0.00	
Kozármisleny	(Hungary)	17 December 2013	30 June 2014	14	3	4	7	21.43	
Melaka United	(Malaysia)	16 June 2017	2 May 2018	18	7	1	10	38.89	
Ubon United	(Thailand)	1 December 2018	14 March 2019	5	2	0	3	40.00	
Semen Padang	(Indonesia)	12 September 2019	31 December 2020	16	5	5	6	31.25	
Arema	(Indonesia)	3 May 2021	5 September 2022	48	26	13	9	54.17	
RANS Nusantara	(Indonesia)	15 May 2023	29 February 2024	26	8	9	9	30.77	
Semen Padang	(Indonesia)	20 September 2024	8 October 2025	33	9	8	16	27.27	
Sukhothai	(Thailand)	11 November 2026	Present	1	1	0	0	100.00	
Career Total				162	61	40	61	37.65	

== Honours ==
Arema

- Piala Presiden: 2022

Individual

- Liga 1 Coach of the Month: November 2021, January 2022
