= Vikrian Akbar =

Indonesian footballer

Personal information
- Full name: Vikrian Akbar Fathoni
- Date of birth: 31 March 2000 (age 26)
- Place of birth: Malang, Indonesia
- Height: 1.75 m (5 ft 9 in)
- Position: Defensive midfielder

Team information
- Current team: RANS Nusantara
- Number: 88

Youth career
- 2016–2019: Arema

Senior career*
Years	Team	Apps	(Gls)
2019–2022	Arema	2	(0)
2022–2023	PSKC Cimahi	1	(0)
2024–2025	Tornado	6	(1)
2025–2026	PS Mojokerto Putra	11	(1)
2026–	RANS Nusantara	1	(0)
- * Club domestic league appearances and goals as of 13 September 2026

Vikrian Akbar Fathoni (born on 31 March 2000) is an Indonesian professional footballer who plays as a defensive midfielder for Championship club RANS Nusantara.

== Club career ==
=== Arema FC ===
He made his professional debut in the Liga 1 on 16 December 2019, against Bali United where he played as a substitute.

== Career statistics ==
=== Club ===
As of 17 February 2025

Club	Season	League			Cup		Continental		Other		Total	
Club	Season	Division	Apps	Goals	Apps	Goals	Apps	Goals	Apps	Goals	Apps	Goals
Arema	2019	Liga 1	2	0	0	0	—		0	0	2	0
Arema	2020	Liga 1	0	0	0	0	—		0	0	0	0
Arema	2021–22	Liga 1	0	0	0	0	—		0	0	0	0
Arema	Total		2	0	0	0	—		0	0	2	0
PSKC Cimahi	2022–23	Liga 2	1	0	0	0	—		0	0	1	0
Tornado	2024–25	Liga Nusantara	6	1	0	0	—		0	0	6	1
Career total			9	1	0	0	0	0	0	0	9	1

== Honours ==
=== Club ===
Arema

- Indonesia President's Cup: 2019

Tornado FC

- Liga Nusantara runner-up: 2024–25
