= Carlos Fortes (footballer, born 1994) =

Cape Verdean footballer (born 1994)

Personal information
- Full name: Carlos Manuel dos Santos Fortes
- Date of birth: 9 November 1994 (age 32)
- Place of birth: Charneca, Portugal
- Height: 1.88 m (6 ft 2 in)
- Position: Forward

Team information
- Current team: SC Delhi
- Number: 99

Youth career
- 2005–2009: Sacavenense
- 2008–2011: Alta Lisboa
- 2011–2012: CAC Pontinha
- 2012–2013: Nacional

Senior career*
Years	Team	Apps	(Gls)
2013–2014	Racing Santander B	23	(10)
2014–2016	Braga B	63	(14)
2016–2017	Braga	1	(0)
2016–2017	→ Şanlıurfaspor (loan)	8	(1)
2017	→ Vizela (loan)	12	(4)
2017–2018	Vizela	26	(10)
2018–2019	Gaz Metan Mediaș	19	(5)
2019–2020	Universitatea Craiova	19	(1)
2020	→ IR Tanger (loan)	7	(0)
2020–2021	Vilafranquense	25	(2)
2021–2022	Arema	31	(20)
2022–2024	PSIS Semarang	37	(13)
2024	Al Dhafra	14	(1)
2024–2025	Foshan Nanshi	25	(10)
2025	Suzhou Dongwu	15	(2)
2026	Song Lam Nghe An	9	(0)
2026–	SC Delhi	4	(2)

International career
2014	Portugal U20	3	(0)
2024	Cape Verde	1	(0)
- * Club domestic league appearances and goals as of 7 November 2026

Carlos Manuel dos Santos Fortes (born 9 November 1994) is a professional footballer who plays as a forward for Indian Super League club SC Delhi. Born in Portugal, he represented the Cape Verde national team.

== Club career ==
=== Braga ===
Born in Charneca, Lisbon metropolitan area, Fortes started his senior career in Spain with Racing de Santander's reserves in the Tercera División. He then returned to Portugal after signing with Braga, being assigned to their B team and spending two full seasons in the Segunda Liga with them, scoring 11 goals in 2015–16.

Fortes played his only competitive match with the first team on 13 March 2016, featuring 90 minutes in the 3–0 away loss against Belenenses in the Primeira Liga. He split the 2016–17 campaign on loan, with Şanlıurfaspor (Turkish TFF First League) and Vizela (Portuguese second division); a permanent move was later agreed with the latter club.

=== Romania ===
In the following years, Fortes plied his trade in Romania, appearing for Gaz Metan Mediaș and Universitatea Craiova. He scored his first goal in the Liga I and top-flight football on 23 July 2018, helping hosts Gaz Metan to defeat Concordia Chiajna 2−1.

=== Indonesia ===
Fortes returned to Portugal and its second tier on 10 July 2020, joining Vilafranquense on a two-year contract. On 12 July 2021, however, he went back abroad and agreed to a one-year deal at Arema of the Liga 1 (Indonesia). He made his league debut on 5 September, starting in a 1–1 draw against PSM Makassar. He scored his first goal later that month, the game's only at Persipura Jayapura, totalling 20 over the season to help his team finish fourth in the table.

On 1 April 2022, Fortes moved to PSIS Semarang of the same country and league. He left the club through a letter addressed to the management in January 2024, citing the desire to be closer to his family as well as offers from the Middle East as the main reasons.

=== Later career ===
On 2 February 2024, Fortes signed a short-term deal with Al Dhafra in the UAE First Division League. In June, he agreed to a one-and-a-half-year contract at China League One club Foshan Nanshi; he completed the 2025 season with Suzhou Dongwu in the same competition.

== International career ==
Fortes appeared with the Portugal under-20 team in the 2014 Toulon Tournament. On 25 March 2024, the 29-year-old was called up to the Cape Verde senior side to replace the injured Bebé in their 2024 FIFA Series squad. He won his first cap the following day, starting the 1–0 win over Equatorial Guinea.

== Personal life ==
Fortes' older brother, Fábio, was also a footballer and a forward.

== Career statistics ==
As of match played 14 June 2025

Appearances and goals by club, season and competition
Club	Season	League			Cup		Continental		Other		Total	
Club	Season	Division	Apps	Goals	Apps	Goals	Apps	Goals	Apps	Goals	Apps	Goals
Racing Santander B	2013–14	Tercera División	23	10	—		—		—		23	10
Braga B	2014–15	Segunda Liga	26	3	—		—		—		26	3
Braga B	2015–16	LigaPro	36	11	—		—		—		36	11
Braga B	Total		62	14	—		—		—		62	14
Braga	2015–16	Primeira Liga	1	0	0	0	0	0	0	0	1	0
Şanlıurfaspor (loan)	2016–17	1. Lig	8	1	4	1	—		—		12	2
Vizela (loan)	2016–17	LigaPro	12	4	—		—		—		12	4
Vizela	2017–18	Campeonato de Portugal	26	10	2	0	—		—		28	10
Gaz Metan Mediaș	2018–19	Liga I	19	5	1	0	—		—		20	5
Universitatea Craiova	2018–19	Liga I	11	0	3	0	—		—		14	0
Universitatea Craiova	2019–20	Liga I	8	1	0	0	6	1	—		14	2
Universitatea Craiova	Total		19	1	3	0	6	1	—		28	2
IR Tanger (loan)	2019–20	Botola	7	0	—		—		—		7	0
Vilafranquense	2020–21	Liga Portugal 2	25	2	1	0	—		—		26	2
Arema	2021–22	Liga 1	31	20	—		—		—		31	20
PSIS Semarang	2022–23	Liga 1	17	3	—		—		—		17	3
PSIS Semarang	2023–24	Liga 1	20	10	—		—		—		20	10
PSIS Semarang	Total		37	13	—		—		—		37	13
Al Dhafra	2023–24	UAE First Division League	14	1	—		—		—		14	1
Foshan Nanshi	2024	China League One	14	8	0	0	—		—		14	8
Foshan Nanshi	2025	China League One	11	2	0	0	—		—		11	2
Foshan Nanshi	Total		25	10	0	0	—		—		25	10
Career total			309	91	11	1	6	1	0	0	327	93

== Honours ==
Individual

- Liga 1 Goal of the Month: October 2021, February 2022
- Liga 1 Best Goal: 2021–22
