= Feby Eka Putra =

Indonesian footballer

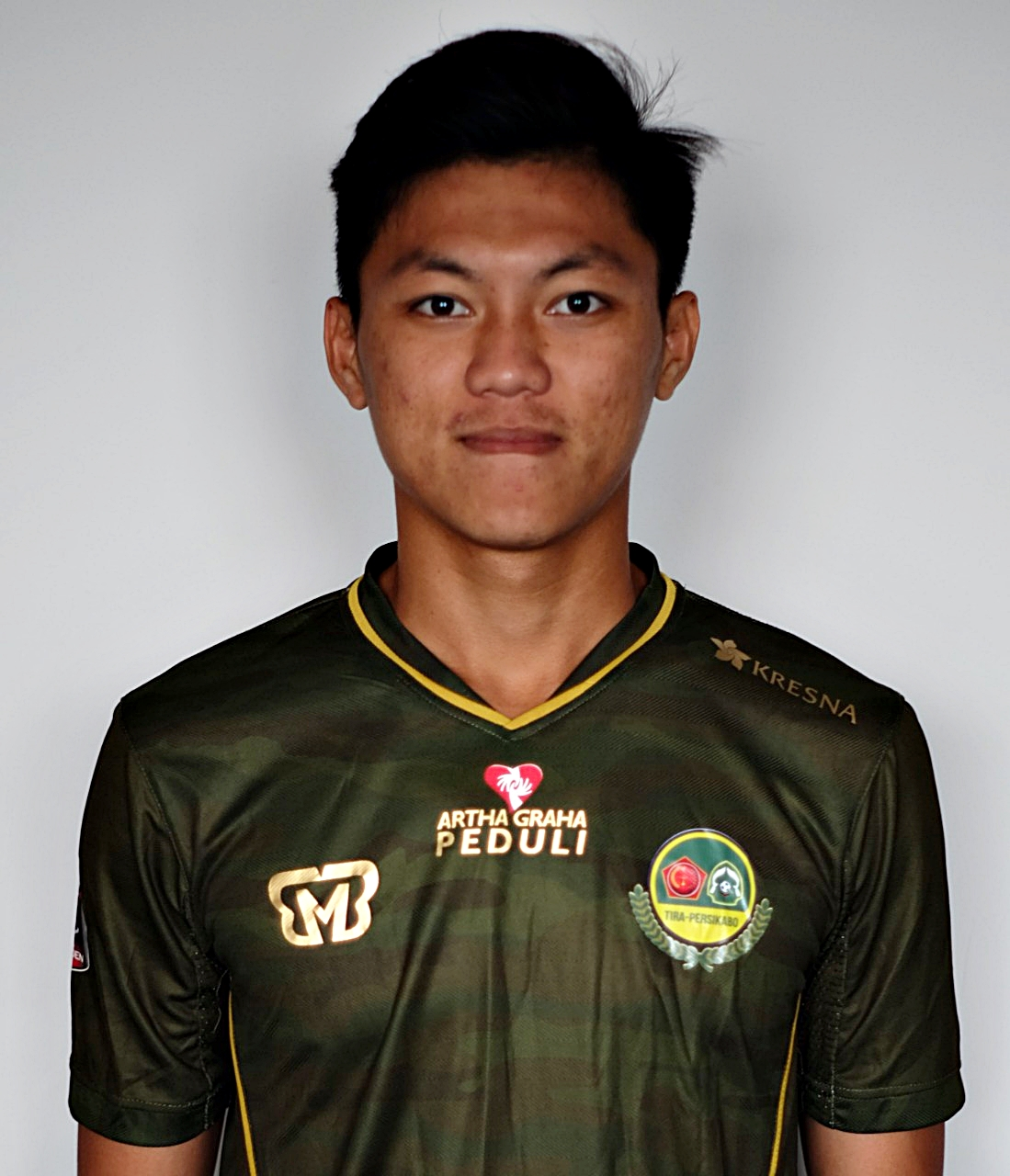
- Feby Eka with TIRA-Persikabo in 2019

Personal information
- Full name: Feby Eka Putra
- Date of birth: 12 February 1999 (age 27)
- Place of birth: Sidoarjo, Indonesia
- Height: 1.83 m (6 ft 0 in)
- Position: Left winger

Team information
- Current team: Persis Solo
- Number: 7

Youth career
- 2011–2016: SSB Gen B Mojokerto
- 2017: Asprov Jawa Timur

Senior career*
Years	Team	Apps	(Gls)
2018–2019	Bali United	1	(0)
2019	→ Persikabo 1973 (loan)	0	(0)
2019	Persija Jakarta	9	(0)
2020–2022	Arema	20	(1)
2022–2026	Dewa United Banten	50	(2)
2026	→ Garudayaksa (loan)	11	(1)
2026–	Persis Solo	4	(0)

International career^{‡}
2017–2018	Indonesia U19	13	(4)
2019–2021	Indonesia U23	7	(0)
Medal record
Men's football
Representing Indonesia
AFF U-19 Youth Championship
Third place	2017 Myanmar
Third place	2018 Indonesia	Team
Southeast Asian Games
Silver medal – second place	2019 Philippines	Team
- * Club domestic league appearances and goals as of 11 October 2026 ‡ National team caps and goals as of 22 October 2021

Feby Eka Putra (born 12 February 1999) is an Indonesian professional footballer who plays as a winger for Championship club Persis Solo.

== Club career ==
=== Bali United ===
On 4 December 2017, Feby signed a four-year contract with Liga 1 club Bali United on a free transfer, along with his national teammate Hanis Saghara Putra. The Coach Widodo Cahyono Putro welcomed the positive arrival of the two players. Hanis and Feby are expected to seize the opportunity well to the professional level, He said "As a former Indonesia national team player, I strongly support the program of Bali United to foster young players to the professional level".

==== TIRA-Persikabo (loan) ====
He was signed for TIRA-Persikabo to play in the 2019 Liga 1 (Indonesia), on loan from Bali United.

=== Persija Jakarta ===
He was signed for Persija Jakarta to play in Liga 1 in the 2019 season. Feby made his league debut on 22 June 2019 in a match against Persela Lamongan at the Surajaya Stadium, Lamongan.

=== Arema ===
He was signed for Arema to play in the 2020 Liga 1, on loan from Persija Jakarta. This season was suspended on 27 March 2020 due to the COVID-19 pandemic. The season was abandoned and was declared void on 20 January 2021.

He made his move to Arema permanent on 10 June 2021, Family factors made him move to Malang, so he could take care of his sick mother in Mojokerto. He made his 2021–22 season league debut in a 1–1 draw against PSM Makassar on 5 September 2021.

=== Dewa United ===
Feby was signed for Dewa United to play in Liga 1 in the 2022–23 season. He made his league debut on 25 July 2022 in a match against Persis Solo at the Moch. Soebroto Stadium, Magelang.

== International career ==
Feby made his International debut on 31 May 2017 in the 2017 Toulon Tournament against Brazil U-20 with a 0–1 defeat. He scored his first International goal and hattrick at 2017 AFF U-18 Youth Championship in a 9–0 win against Philippines U-19.

== Honours ==
Persija Jakarta

- Piala Indonesia runner-up: 2018–19

Garudayaksa

- Championship: 2025–26

Indonesia U19

- AFF U-19 Youth Championship third place: 2017, 2018

Indonesia U23

- SEA Games silver medal: 2019
