= Jayus Hariono =

Indonesian footballer

Personal information
- Full name: Jayus Hariono
- Date of birth: 27 January 1997 (age 29)
- Place of birth: Malang, Indonesia
- Height: 1.80 m (5 ft 11 in)
- Position: Defensive midfielder

Team information
- Current team: Persiraja Banda Aceh (on loan from Arema)
- Number: 14

Youth career
- 2015–2016: Persekam Metro

Senior career*
Years	Team	Apps	(Gls)
2016–2018	Persekam Metro	21	(0)
2018–	Arema	136	(4)
2025	→ PSS Sleman (loan)	15	(0)
2026–	→ Persiraja Banda Aceh (loan)	1	(0)
- * Club domestic league appearances and goals as of 13 September 2026

Jayus Hariono (born 27 January 1997) is an Indonesian professional footballer who plays as a defensive midfielder for Championship club Persiraja Banda Aceh, on loan from Super League club Arema.

== Club career ==
=== Arema ===
He was signed for Arema to play in Liga 1 in the 2018 season. On 6 October 2018, he made his Arema debut playing the full 90 minutes in a 1–0 league victory over Persebaya Surabaya. On 20 October 2019, as Arema draw 2–2 at Persipura Jayapura, he scored the first goal of his professional career.

== Career statistics ==
=== Club ===
As of 13 September 2026

Club	Season	League			Cup (Note: Includes Piala Indonesia.)		Continental		Other (Note: Appearances in Piala Presiden.)		Total	
Club	Season	Division	Apps	Goals	Apps	Goals	Apps	Goals	Apps	Goals	Apps	Goals
Persekam Metro	2016	ISC B	8	0	0	0	—		0	0	8	0
Persekam Metro	2017	Liga 2	13	0	0	0	—		0	0	13	0
Persekam Metro	Total		21	0	0	0	—		0	0	21	0
Arema	2018	Liga 1	10	0	0	0	—		0	0	10	0
Arema	2019	Liga 1	17	1	1	0	—		8	0	26	1
Arema	2020	Liga 1	0	0	0	0	—		0	0	0	0
Arema	2021–22	Liga 1	27	1	0	0	—		2 (Note: Appearances in Menpora Cup.)	0	29	1
Arema	2022–23	Liga 1	29	2	0	0	—		8	0	37	2
Arema	2023–24	Liga 1	28	0	0	0	—		0	0	28	0
Arema	2024–25	Liga 1	4	0	0	0	—		2	0	6	0
Arema	2025–26	Super League	21	0	0	0	—		2	0	23	0
Arema	Total		136	4	1	0	—		22	0	159	4
PSS Sleman (loan)	2024–25	Liga 1	15	0	0	0	—		0	0	15	0
Persiraja Banda Aceh (loan)	2026–27	Championship	1	0	0	0	—		0	0	1	0
Career total			173	4	1	0	0	0	22	0	196	4

== Honours ==
Arema

- Piala Presiden: 2019, 2022, 2024
