= Kushedya Hari Yudo =

Indonesian footballer (born 1993)

Personal information
- Full name: Kushedya Hari Yudo
- Date of birth: 16 July 1993 (age 33)
- Place of birth: Malang, Indonesia
- Height: 1.73 m (5 ft 8 in)
- Positions: Forward; winger

Team information
- Current team: Persela Lamongan

Youth career
- 2011–2012: Arema
- 2012–2013: Persib Bandung

Senior career*
Years	Team	Apps	(Gls)
2013–2014	Persewangi Banyuwangi	0	(0)
2015	PS Badung	0	(0)
2016	Persewangi Banyuwangi	7	(3)
2016–2017	Gresik United	13	(2)
2017–2018	Persekam Metro	6	(3)
2018–2019	Kalteng Putra	26	(14)
2019–2020	PSS Sleman	29	(5)
2020–2023	Arema	21	(5)
2023–2024	RANS Nusantara	14	(1)
2024–2025	PSPS Pekanbaru	6	(0)
2025–2026	Kendal Tornado	24	(7)
2026–	Persela Lamongan	0	(0)

International career
2021	Indonesia	10	(0)
Medal record
Men's football
Representing Indonesia
AFF Championship
Runner-up	2020 Singapore	Team
- * Club domestic league appearances and goals as of 3 May 2026

Kushedya Hari Yudo (born 16 July 1993) is an Indonesian professional footballer who plays as a forward for Championship club Persela Lamongan.

== Club career ==
=== Kalteng Putra ===
After years of struggling in third-tier clubs on Indonesia's more developed islands of Java and Bali, including several moments of considering to quit the football world, Yudo in 2018 moved to the forested island of Borneo to join Liga 2 club Kalteng Putra for one year. Beyond expectations, he scored 14 goals for the Central Kalimantan club in the 2018 Liga 2 season and almost brought the team to win promotion to Liga 1. Minnow Kalteng Putra narrowly missed the cut.

=== PSS Sleman ===
Nonetheless, Yudo's breakout 2018 performance led the club that topped the 2018 Liga 2 competition, PSS Sleman, to hire him for the 2019 Liga 1 season. Yudo made his league debut in a 3–1 win against Arema on 15 May 2019 as a substitute for Arsyad Yusgiantoro in the 59th minute. Yudo scored his first league goal for PSS Sleman in a 3–1 loss over TIRA-Persikabo at the Pakansari Stadium. His five goals and four assists for PSS made his name finally recognized in Indonesia's footballing world.

=== Arema ===
Amid offers from various clubs, Yudo in 2020 joined his hometown club Arema for the 2020 Liga 1 season. He made his league debut for the club, in a 0–2 win against TIRA-Persikabo on 2 March 2020 and Yudo also scored his first goal with scored a brace, he scored in the 5th and 49th minutes. With his two goals in a match against TIRA-Persikabo triggered the interest of Indonesia national football team coach Shin Tae-yong who was appointed two months before. Shin included Yudo in training camps in 2020 and 2021, leading to his selection for the coach's first senior team line-up in May 2021.

Yudo starting his new 2021–22 season of Liga 1 appearance on 5 September 2021, coming on as a starter in a 1–1 draw with PSM Makassar at the Pakansari Stadium. On 27 October 2021, he scored his first goal of the season in a match against Persita Tangerang, final result, Arema draw 2–2. Five days later, he scored the opening goal in a 1–2 win against Madura United at the Sultan Agung Stadium.

=== RANS Nusantara ===
Kushedya was signed for RANS Nusantara to play in Liga 1 in the 2023–24 season. He made his debut on 3 July 2023 in a match against Persikabo 1973 at the Maguwoharjo Stadium, Sleman.

== International career ==
Despite having zero experience playing for his country at all levels, Yudo received a call to join the senior team in May 2021 to be part of the Indonesia team for the 2022 FIFA World Cup qualification matches in the United Arab Emirates. He earned his first senior cap at the late age of 27 in a 25 May 2021 friendly match in Dubai against Afghanistan, which was a warm-up ahead of the qualifiers.

== Career statistics ==
=== Club ===
As of match played 3 May 2026

Club	Season	League			Cup (Note: Includes Piala Indonesia)		Continental		Other		Total	
Club	Season	Division	Apps	Goals	Apps	Goals	Apps	Goals	Apps	Goals	Apps	Goals
PS Badung	2015	Premier Division	0	0	0	0	—		0	0	0	0
Persewangi Banyuwangi	2016	ISC B	7	3	0	0	—		0	0	7	3
Persegres Gresik	2016	ISC A	8	2	0	0	—		0	0	8	2
Persegres Gresik	2017	Liga 1	5	0	0	0	—		0	0	5	0
Persegres Gresik	Total		13	2	0	0	—		0	0	13	2
Persekam Metro	2017	Liga 2	6	3	0	0	—		0	0	6	3
Kalteng Putra	2018	Liga 2	26	14	0	0	—		0	0	26	14
PSS Sleman	2019	Liga 1	29	5	1	0	—		3 (Note: Appearances in Indonesia President's Cup)	1	33	6
Arema	2020	Liga 1	3	2	0	0	—		0	0	3	2
Arema	2021–22	Liga 1	14	3	0	0	—		3 (Note: Appearances in Menpora Cup)	0	17	3
Arema	2022–23	Liga 1	4	0	0	0	—		0	0	4	0
Arema	Total		21	5	0	0	—		3	0	24	5
RANS Nusantara	2023–24	Liga 1	14	1	0	0	—		0	0	14	1
PSPS Pekanbaru	2024–25	Liga 2	6	0	0	0	—		0	0	6	0
Kendal Tornado	2025–26	Liga 2	24	7	0	0	—		0	0	24	7
Career total			146	40	1	0	0	0	6	1	153	41

=== International ===
As of match played 19 December 2021

Appearances and goals by national team and year
National team	Year	Apps	Goals
Indonesia	2021	10	0
Total		10	0

== Honours ==
=== Club ===
Kalteng Putra

- Liga 2 third place (play-offs): 2018

Arema

- Indonesia President's Cup: 2022

=== International ===
Indonesia

- AFF Championship runner-up: 2020
