= 2015 Persib Bandung season =

Indonesian football club season

Persib Bandung
2015 season
- Owner: PT Persib Bandung Bermartabat
- CEO: Glenn Sugita
- Head coach: Djadjang Nurdjaman
- Stadium: Si Jalak Harupat
- AFC Champions League: Preliminary Round 2
- AFC Cup: Round of 16
- Top goalscorer: League: Atep; Muhammad Taufiq; Makan Konaté; Muhammad Ridwan (1); All: Makan Konate (9)
- Highest home attendance: 26,193 vs. Semen Padang (4 April 2015)
- Lowest home attendance: 8,742 vs. Pelita Bandung Raya (7 April 2015)
- Average home league attendance: 17,467

The 2015 season was the 56th season in the history of Persib Bandung, the club's 20th consecutive season in the top-flight of Indonesian football since it became fully professional, and the seventh season competing in the Indonesia Super League.

== Review and events ==
=== Pre–2015 ===
Persib was invited to compete in an international friendly tournament, Marah Halim Cup 2015, from 4–14 January 2015, but declined it on 9 December 2014. They began their first training for the 2015 Indonesia Super League on 23 December 2014. They were planning to have a training center using the facilities of Inter Milan in Italy starting January 6, 2015, but due to tight schedule, the plan was cancelled. Persib stated that they will participate in the 2015 Walikota Padang Cup on 4–8 January 2015. On a 3×40 minutes friendly against local club Tiki Taka FC on 31 December 2014, Persib won 4–0 with each goal from Firman Utina, trial player Hector Eduardo Sosa, new recruit Yandi Sofyan Munawar, and Atep Rizal.

Due to winning the 2014 Indonesia Super League, Persib was given a spot on 2015 AFC Champions League. They, alongside Persipura, also received byes on the 2015 Piala Indonesia and will directly participate in the Round of 16.

Persib retained the majority of the squad. Persib released Djibril Coulibaly due to declining performance. Some players who would still play for this season are Abdul Rahman, Firman Utina, and the three goalkeepers, and some players who got new contracts are Makan Konaté, Muhammad Agung Pribadi, Vladimir Vujović, and Rudiyana. Ferdinand Sinaga left the club to join Sriwijaya F.C. Persib has currently secured three new players, which are Dedi Kusnandar, Dias Angga Putra, and Yandi Sofyan Munawar. Persib actually had gotten the signature of striker Aron da Silva, but he backed out because his old club won't release him. Strikers Michele Di Piedi and Hector Eduardo Sosa came to trial on Persib, but none of them were recruited. Meanwhile, striker Maycon Calijuri who came to trial on 30 December continued the selection.

=== January ===
Emral Abus was signed to replace Djadjang Nurdjaman as the head coach for the AFC Champions League due to restricting requirement of the competition. Joining Maycon, strikers Nicolás Vigneri and Koh Traore came to trial on Persib. Vigneri was released on 26 January, while Maycon and Traore's fate will be determined after the 2014 Indonesian Inter Island Cup finals on 1 February. Striker Sigit Hermawan were loaned to PSGC Ciamis on a 1-season-long loan.

On the 2015 Piala Walikota Padang, Persib won the cup after defeating PSP Padang and Pusamania Borneo F.C. both 3–0 on group stage and Persiba Balikpapan 2–0 in the final. Tantan also became the top-scorer. On an international friendly against Felda United F.C. they won 3–1. They won 2–1 on another friendly against Persibat Batang. They run two friendly matches on their training center in Ciamis against Persires Kuningan and PSGC Ciamis and won both of them 3–0 and 3–1 respectively.

Three Diklat Persib players, Gian Zola, Hanif Sahbandi, and Jujun Saefuloh, were called up to Indonesia national U-16 and U-19 team selection. Persib's third goal-keeper M Natshir were called up to Indonesia national U-22 national team. Manager Umuh Muchtar became one of PT Liga Indonesia's commissioner for 2015 season due to Persib's win in the previous season.

=== February ===
On their first official match of the season, Persib lost 4–0 against Hanoi T&T F.C. on Mỹ Đình National Stadium on the 2nd preliminary round of the 2015 AFC Champions League qualifying play-offs. Their first ISL match was supposed to be on 20 February 2015 against last year's runners-up Persipura Jayapura, before Kemenpora on 18 February decided to postpone 2015 ISL due to too many clubs that haven't completed their licensing files. On their first 2015 AFC Cup match, Persib won 4–1 in their home against Maldivian team New Radiant S.C. with Jufriyanto, Konaté, Atep, and Yandi scored each a goal.

On the 2014 Indonesian Inter Island Cup finals, Persib lost 1–2 to Arema Cronus F.C. with Vujović scored Persib's only goal. They won 5–1 on a friendly against Cilegon United F.C., with Yandi, Supardi, Tantan, Vujović, and trial player Robson da Silva scoring the goals. They run another friendly against their youth team Diklat Persib and won 3–1 with Atep, Konaté, and Jufriyanto scored the goals. They also won the following friendly against Football Plus FC on 20 February by 7–0, with Konaté scored three goals, Tantan scored two goals, and Atep and Firman scored a goal each.

The two trial strikers, Maycon and Traore, were stripped from the squad, but the statement was changed and Maycon will continue to trial because Persib is still waiting for Maycon's legal status from PT Liga Indonesia. Three more strikers came to trial on Persib on 3 and 4 February, Robson da Silva, Kim Shin-young and Carlos Raul Sciucatti. Maycon, Robson, and Carlos Raul were stripped from the trial on 7 February, while Kim Shin-young stripped later on 13 February along with Nigerian striker Charles Parker who came on the same day. Striker Silvio Escobar came to trial on 16 February, but released on the following day. Local player Nico Malau who were invited to trial on Persib since mid-February were released on 21 February. Malian striker Ousmane Ben Goïta came to trial on 23 February 2015, but probably weren't recruited, stated by head coach Djadjang Nurdjaman. Croatian striker who were stated by the management to join Persib, Ivan Krstanović, declined and joined a European team. Cameroonian striker George Menougong came to trial on 27 February, but released on the following day.

Persib launch their team on 6 February in Siliwangi Stadium, introducing the players and 9 jerseys, three for 2015 Indonesia Super League and 2015 Piala Indonesia, two for Asian competition, two for training, and two for youth team. 2×15 minutes exhibition match also ran here by Persib against Ligina 1994/95 winners, Persib won 4–0 with two goals by Konaté and the other two by Tantan and Rudiyana. On 17 February, Persib announced Mulyana as the vice manager of the team for all competition. Persib's team doctor, Rafi Ghani, take part in ISL Medic Team training in Jakarta on 17–18 February. On 20 February, teams of 2015 ISL gathered in Bandung to state their actions against the delay of 2015 ISL as Declaration of Bandung. Persib's third goalkeeper, M Natshir, were called up to the list of 23 players of Indonesia national U-22 football team players.

=== March ===
On their visit to Bali, they won 1–0 against Bali United Pusam F.C. with Tantan scoring the lone goal.

Finnish striker Niklas Tarvajarvi joined Persib's training while he was in Bali, but not intending to trial. Georgian striker Apollon Lemondzhava trials on Persib.

Persib's assistant coach Asep Soemantri joined the AFC C License Coaching Course on 16–28 February in National Youth Training Center Facility, Depok.

=== May ===
The 2015 Indonesia Super League was officially discontinued by PSSI on May 2, 2015, due to a ban by Imam Nahrawi, Minister of Youth and Sports Affairs, against PSSI to run any football competition.

== Matches ==
=== Legend ===
Win Draw Loss Postponed

=== Friendlies ===
Competition	Date	KO	Stadium	City	Opponent	Result^{1}	Attendance	Goalscorers		Source
Competition	Date	KO	Stadium	City	Opponent	Result^{1}	Attendance	Persib Bandung	Opponent	Source
	31 December 2014		H	Bandung	Tiki Taka FC	4–0		Utina 22'; Sosa 41'; Yandi 75'; Atep 116'		
Walikota Padang Cup	4 January 2015	16:15	A	Padang	PSP Padang	3–0		Maycon 55'; Sucipto 59'; Tantan 75'		
Walikota Padang Cup	6 January 2015	16:15	A	Padang	Pusamania Borneo	3–0		Atep 38'; Tantan 54', 89'		
Walikota Padang Cup	8 January 2015	19:00	A	Padang	Persiba Balikpapan	2–0		Maycon 30' (pen.); Konaté 33'		
	11 January 2015	19:30	H	Soreang	(Malaysia) Felda United F.C.	3–1		Konaté 3'; Tantan 41'; Yandi 61'	Makeche 55'	
	16 January 2015		H	Bandung	Persibat Batang	2–1		Sukmara 67'; Taufiq 89'	Hafidin 84'	
	21 January 2015		A	Ciamis	Persires Kuningan	3–0		Maycon 17'; Dias 40'; Konaté 68'		
	24 January 2015		A	Ciamis	PSGC Ciamis	3–1		Atep 54'; Konaté 58' (pen.) 61'	Goal	
2014 IIC Final	1 February 2015	19:00	A	Palembang	Arema Cronus	1–2		Vujović 75'	Beltrame 47' (pen.); Kennedy 115'	
	5 February 2015		H	Bandung	Cilegon United	5–1		Yandi 22'; Supardi 31'; Tantan 36'; Vujović 39' da Silva 82'	62'	
	16 February 2015		H	Bandung	Persib Bandung U-17	3–1		Atep 17'; Konaté 68'; Jufriyanto 83'	85'	
	20 February 2015		A	Parongpong	Football Plus	7–0		Konaté; Tantan; Atep; Utina		
	3 March 2015	20:00	A	Gianyar	Bali United Pusam F.C.	1–0		Tantan 61'		
	15 March 2015		A	Cimahi	Setia FC	8–0		Lemondzhava 11', 15', 42', 70'; Atep 27'; Kusnandar 37'; Utina 80'; Vujović 83'		
	22 March 2015	15:30	A	Ciamis	Bhayangkara F.C.	0–1			Mbamba 2'	
	24 March 2015		A	Ciamis	PSGC Ciamis	4–3		Konaté 28'; Atep 48'; Sulaiman 72'; Rudiyana 86'	Rosian 8'; Sukmara (o.g); Ganjar 90'	
	30 March 2015		A	Cimahi	UNI	11–0		Spasojević 8', 46', 48'; Konaté 12', 54'; Vujović 28', 50'; Ridwan 29'; Atep 75'; Rudiyana 82'; Yandi 84'		
	24 April 2015		A	Cimahi	Al Jabbar FC	9–0		Atep 14'; Yandi 15'; Spasojević 49' (pen.) 65', 79'; Rudiyana 54', 71', 89'; Tantan 86'		
	9 May 2015		A	Cimahi	Persigar Garut	14–0		Konaté 6', 12', 31'; Atep 10', 41'; Tantan 26'; Utina 28', 34'; Ridwan 36'; Rudiyana 54'; Spasojević 57' (pen.) 65', 73', 85'		
	17 May 2015	15:30	A	Gianyar	Bali United Pusam F.C.	2–0		Spasojević 21'; Taufiq 30'		
	22 May 2015	18:30	H	Soreang	Selangor FA	4–2		Atep 32', 89'; Ridwan 55'; Konaté 78'	Vermansyah 34'; Dos Santos 58'	

=== Indonesia Super League ===
MD	Date	KO	Stadium	City	Opponent	Result^{1}	Attendance	Goalscorers		Source
MD	Date	KO	Stadium	City	Opponent	Result^{1}	Attendance	Persib Bandung	Opponent	Source
1	4 April 2015	15:30	H	Soreang	Semen Padang	1–0	26,193	Ridwan 18'		
2	7 April 2015	15:15	H	Soreang	Pelita Bandung Raya	3–0	8,742	Atep 47'; Konaté 72'; Taufiq 84'		

=== AFC Champions League ===
RD	Date	KO	Stadium	City	Opponent	Result^{1}	Attendance	Goalscorers		Source
RD	Date	KO	Stadium	City	Opponent	Result^{1}	Attendance	Persib Bandung	Opponent	Source
PR2	10 February 2015	12:00	A	Hanoi	(Vietnam) Hà Nội T&T	0–4	2,500		Marronkle 34' (pen.) 57'; Samson 47', 71'	

=== AFC Cup ===
RD	Date	KO	Stadium	City	Opponent	Result^{1}	Attendance	Goalscorers		Source
RD	Date	KO	Stadium	City	Opponent	Result^{1}	Attendance	Persib Bandung	Opponent	Source
MD1	25 February 2015	15:00	H	Soreang	(Maldives) New Radiant	4–1	15,000	Jufriyanto 15'; Konaté 42'; Atep 45+1'; Yandi 90+2'	Ali 60'	
MD2	11 March 2015	15:30	A	Yangon	(Myanmar) Ayeyawady United F.C.	1–1	500	Atep 45'	Fonseca 58'	
MD3	13 March 2015	15:00	H	Soreang	(Laos) Lao Toyota FC	1–0	18,552	Atep 20'		
MD4	15 April 2015	18:00	A	Vientiane	(Laos) Lao Toyota FC	0–0	120			
MD5	29 April 2015	16:00	A	Male	(Maldives) New Radiant	1–0	500	Ridwan 14'		
MD6	13 May 2015	16:00	H	Soreang	(Myanmar) Ayeyawady United F.C.	3–3	12,250	Nasir 29'; Ridwan 52'; Konaté 90' (pen.)	Naumov 44', 76' (pen.); Aung 90+3'	
R16	27 May 2015	15:00	H	Soreang	(Hong Kong) Kitchee SC	0–2	12,352		Belencoso 32'; Wai 44'	

Notes

- 1.Persib Bandung's goals first.

== Squad ==
As of 27 May 2015.

No.	Pos	Nat	Player	Total		Indonesia Super League		AFC Champions League		AFC Cup	
No.	Pos	Nat	Player	Apps	Goals	Apps	Goals	Apps	Goals	Apps	Goals
1	GK	(Indonesia) IDN	Muhammad Natshir	1	0	0	0	0	0	1	0
3	DF	(Montenegro) MNE	Vladimir Vujović	9	0	2	0	1	0	6	0
4	DF	(Indonesia) IDN	Dias Angga Putra	6	0	2	0	1	0	3	0
6	DF	(Indonesia) IDN	Tony Sucipto	9	0	2	0	1	0	6	0
7	MF	(Indonesia) IDN	Atep	10	4	2	1	1	0	7	3
8	MF	(Indonesia) IDN	Muhammad Taufiq	8	1	2	1	1	0	5	0
10	DF	(Mali) MLI	Makan Konaté	10	3	2	1	1	0	7	2
11	MF	(Indonesia) IDN	Dedi Kusnandar	9	0	2	0	1	0	6	0
12	GK	(Indonesia) IDN	Shahar Ginanjar	0	0	0	0	0	0	0	0
13	DF	(Indonesia) IDN	Muhammad Agung Pribadi	0	0	0	0	0	0	0	0
15	MF	(Indonesia) IDN	Firman Utina	9	0	2	0	0	0	7	0
16	DF	(Indonesia) IDN	Achmad Jufriyanto	8	1	2	0	1	0	5	1
17	FW	(Indonesia) IDN	Rudiyana	0	0	0	0	0	0	0	0
18	DF	(Indonesia) IDN	Jajang Sukmara	2	0	0	0	1	0	1	0
22	DF	(Indonesia) IDN	Supardi Nasir	8	1	0	0	1	0	7	1
23	MF	(Indonesia) IDN	Muhammad Ridwan	10	3	2	1	1	0	7	2
24	MF	(Indonesia) IDN	Hariono	7	0	2	0	1	0	4	0
28	DF	(Indonesia) IDN	Abdul Rahman Sulaiman	4	0	0	0	0	0	4	0
78	GK	(Indonesia) IDN	I Made Wirawan	9	0	2	0	1	0	6	0
82	FW	(Indonesia) IDN	Tantan	10	0	2	0	1	0	7	0
87	FW	(Montenegro) MNE	Ilija Spasojević	2	0	2	0	0	0	0	0
99	FW	(Indonesia) IDN	Yandi Sofyan	4	1	0	0	0	0	4	1
Players who left the club during the 2015 season
19	FW	(Indonesia) IDN	Sigit Hermawan (on loan to PSGC Ciamis)	0	0	0	0	0	0	0	0

== Transfers ==
=== In ===
No.	Pos.	Name	Moving from	Type	Sources
4	DF	(Indonesia) Dias Angga Putra	Pelita Bandung Raya		
11	MF	(Indonesia) Dedi Kusnandar	Bhayangkara F.C.		
87	FW	(Montenegro) Ilija Spasojević	Pelita Bandung Raya		
99	FW	(Indonesia) Yandi Sofyan	Arema Cronus		

=== Out ===
No.	Pos.	Name	Moving to	Type	Sources
	FW	(Mali) Djibril Coulibaly	Semen Padang	Released	
	FW	(Indonesia) Ferdinand Sinaga	Sriwijaya		
	FW	(Indonesia) Sigit Hermawan	PSGC Ciamis	Out on loan	

== Statistics ==
=== Goalscorers ===
Rank	No.	Pos	Nat	Player	QNB League	AFC Cup	Walikota Padang Cup	President Cup	Jendral Sudirman Cup	Total
1	10	MF	(Mali)	Makan Konate	1	2	1	3	2	9
2	54	FW	(Indonesia)	Zulham Zamrun	0	0	0	6	0	6
3	7	MF	(Indonesia)	Atep	1	3	0	1	0	5
3	82	FW	(Indonesia)	Tantan	0	0	3	2	0	5
4	87	FW	(Montenegro)	Ilija Spasojevic	0	0	0	4	0	4
5	23	MF	(Indonesia)	M. Ridwan	1	2	0	0	0	3
6	3	DF	(Montenegro)	Vladimir Vujovic	0	0	1	1	0	2
6	16	DF	(Indonesia)	Achmad Jufriyanto	0	1	0	1	0	2
6	9	FW	(Brazil)	Maycon Calijuri	0	0	2	0	0	2
7	8	MF	(Indonesia)	Taufiq	1	0	0	0	0	1
7	22	DF	(Indonesia)	Supardi Nasir	0	1	0	0	0	1
7	99	FW	(Indonesia)	Yandi Sofyan	0	1	0	0	0	1
7	19	MF	(Indonesia)	Febri Hariyadi	0	0	0	0	1	1
7	6	DF	(Indonesia)	Tony Sucipto	0	0	1	0	0	1
Own goal					0	0	0	1	0	1
Totals					4	10	6	19	3	42
