= 2014 Indonesian Inter Island Cup final =

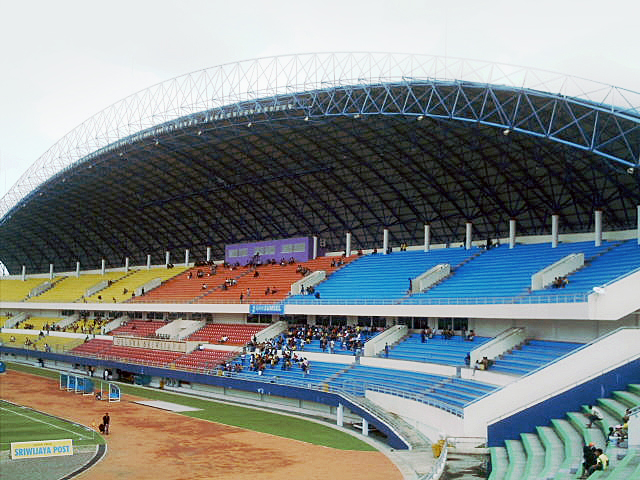
- The final was played at Jakabaring Stadium.
- Event: 2014 Indonesian Inter Island Cup
Arema Cronous	Persib Bandung
2	1
- After extra time
- Date: 1 February 2015
- Venue: Jakabaring Stadium, Palembang
- Man of the Match: Cristian Gonzáles
- Referee: Handri Kristanto
- Attendance: 7,529
- Weather: Light rain 23 °C; 83% humidity

The 2014 Indonesian Inter Island Cup final was the final match of the 2014 Indonesian Inter Island Cup which took place on 5 February 2015 at Jakabaring Stadium in Palembang and was contested by Arema Cronus and Persib.Arema Cronus won the match 2–1 on extra time, following a 2–1 after extra time, for their final fifth Indonesian Inter Island Cup title after the competition was postponed previously.

== Background ==
Persib Bandung and Arema Cronous have never won Inter Island Cup. Persib Bandung was embarrassing at home at Jakabaring in the inaugural match of the 2010 Indonesian Inter Island Cup, after being defeated 0–6 by hosts Sriwijaya FC.

In 2014 Persib won 3–1 over Arema Cronus in the extra time in the Indonesia Super League Semifinals.

== Venues ==
The 2014 Indonesian Inter Island Cup final between Arema Cronus and Persib Bandung which was held at the Gelora Delta Stadium was cancelled, because security did not issue permission to hold the match. PT Liga Indonesia was forced to decide to postpone the final until an undetermined time. This is because PT LI remains focused on the start of the 2014 Indonesia Super League season on February 1, 2014. How the IIC final will be held in June, August, or December 2014. PT. LI decided to hold the IIC final in November or December, in line with the ISL competition which would end on November 15, 2014.

The 2014 Inter Island Cup final was planned to take place in January 2015. On January 3, 2015, PT Liga Indonesia designated Sultan Agung Stadium in Bantul as the venue for the 2014 Inter Island final match is scheduled to host the event on January 27, 2015. On January 12, 2015, the Pre-Season Tournament entitled 2015 SCM Cup was announced to take place on 17-27 January 2015, Making the Inter Island Cup postponed again. Sultan Agung Stadium as a venue was canceled and moved to Palembang, due to reasons by PT Liga Indonesia. PT Liga Indonesia finally appointed Gelora Jakabaring in Palembang as the venue for this match since the first edition in 2010.

== Road to the final ==
Note: In all results below, the score of the finalist is given first (H: home; A: away).

Arema Cronous		Round	Persib	
Opponent	Result	Group stage	Opponent	Result
Perseru	1–0 (H)	Matchday 1	Persiram Raja Ampat	0–0 (H)
Barito Putera	2–2 (A)	Matchday 2	Mitra Kukar	1–1 (A)
Sriwijaya	1–0 (A)	Matchday 3	Persik Kediri	3–2 (H)
Group A winners: Pos / Team / Pld / Pts; 1 / Arema Cronous / 3 / 7; 2 / Barito Putera / 3 / 5; 3 / Sriwijaya / 3 / 3; 4 / Perseru Serui / 3 / 1; Source:		Final standings	Group B winners: Pos / Team / Pld / Pts; 1 / Persib / 3 / 5; 2 / Persiram Raja Ampat / 3 / 5; 3 / Mitra Kukar / 3 / 4; 4 / Persik Kediri / 3 / 1; Source:	

=== Arema Cronus ===
Arema Cronus were drawn in Group A for the Indonesian Inter Island Cup, in which they were joined by Perseru Serui, Sriwijaya FC and the Barito Putera at the Kanjuruhan Stadium in Malang.

On January 18, 2014, Arema Cronus won their opening match against Perseru Serui with a narrow 1–0 victory, through 56th minute penalty goal by Gustavo Lopez.

Arema Cronus's second match was against Barito Putera. Singo Edan took a two-goal lead, with Sunarto scoring in the 23rd minute and Cristian Gonzáles in the 25th minute. Young player Irsyad Maulana added a second for Arema Cronus in the 25th minute, with a shot from inside the penalty area that goalkeeper Harlan failed to stop. Barito pulled two goals back, Shaka Bangura narrowed the deficit with a powerful shot that resulted in a goal in the 32nd minute. After the break, Barito Putera equalized in the 78th minute with Syahroni's goal came from a pass from Yosua Pahabol on the right side in front of the goal without any guard and immediately fired a shot towards Kurnia Meiga's goal which was unstoppable.

In the last match, Arema won 1-0 over Sriwijaya FC Through Irsyad Maulana, he was able to send a cross that was finished well by Gonzáles in the 45+1 minute. Singo Edan advanced to the final for the first time.

=== Persib Bandung ===
Meanwhile, Persib Bandung is in Group B with Mitra Kukar, Persiram, Persik at Manahan Stadium in Solo. In the first match, Persib Bandung drew with Persiram 0-0. Persib again drew against Mitra Kukar 1-1 with Fortune Udo's goal in the 75th minute, which was then answered by Erick Weeks Lewis's free-kick in the 84th minute. In the decisive match, Persib finally won over Persik Kediri with a score of 3-2.

== Match ==
=== Summary ===
==== First half ====
To be confirmed.

==== Second half ====
To be confirmed.

==== Extra time ====
To be confirmed.

=== Details ===
1 February 2015
18:45 UTC+7:00

Arema Cronous	2 – 1 (a.e.t.)	Persib Bandung
Fabiano 51' (pen.); Kennedy 116'		Vujović 76'

Gelora Sriwijaya Stadium, Palembang
Attendance: 7,529
Referee: Muslimin

Arema Cronus	Persib

Arema Cronus
GK	21	(Indonesia) I Made Wardana
DF	15	(Indonesia) Fabiano
DF	32	(Indonesia) Victor Igbonefo
DF	59	(Indonesia) Hasyim Kipuw (yellow card) 90'
DF	87	(Indonesia) Johan Alfarizi
MF	77	(Indonesia) Juan Revi (substituted off) 50'
MF	12	(Indonesia) Hendro Siswanto (yellow card) 12' (substituted off) 106'
MF	19	(Indonesia) Ahmad Bustomi (substituted off) 68'
FW	21	(Indonesia) Ferry Aman Saragih (yellow card) 53' (yellow-red card) 117'
FW	17	(Indonesia) Samsul Arif
FW	77	(Indonesia) Cristian Gonzáles
Substitutes:
MF	44	(Indonesia) I Gede Sukadana (substituted on) 68'
FW	17	(Indonesia) Ahmad Nufiandani (substituted on) 50'
FW	22	(Liberia) Sengbah Kennedy (substituted on) 106'
Manager:
(Indonesia) Suharno

Persib Bandung
GK	78	(Indonesia) I Made Wirawan
DF	22	(Indonesia) Supardi Nasir
DF	6	(Indonesia) Tony Sucipto
MF	16	(Indonesia) Achmad Jufriyanto
MF	3	(Montenegro) Vladimir Vujović
MF	11	(Indonesia) Dedi Kusnandar
MF	24	(Indonesia) Hariono	(yellow card) 26' (yellow-red card) 99'
MF	7	(Indonesia) Atep Rizal
MF	10	(Mali) Makan Konaté
FW	9	(Brazil) Maycon (substituted off) 46'
FW	82	(Indonesia) Tantan
Substitutes:
MF	8	(Indonesia) Muhammad Taufiq
MF	15	(Indonesia) Firman Utina (substituted on) 69'
FW	14	(Burkina Faso) Koh Traoré	(substituted on) 46'	(substituted off) 69'
Manager:
(Indonesia) Djajang Nurdjaman

Man of the Match:
Cristian Gonzáles

Assistant referees:
Beni Andriko
S. Yunus
Fourth official:
Masril

Match rules

- 90 minutes.
- 30 minutes of extra time if necessary.
- Penalty shoot-out if scores still level.
- Seven named substitutes, of which up to three may be used.

== Post-match ==
As the 2015 Indonesia Super League was halted due to a government ban and FIFA sanctions against PSSI, there were no football competitions until the 2015 Indonesia President's Cup, in which Persib became champions, while Arema finished in third place.
