= 2019 Indonesia President's Cup =

Piala Presiden

Tournament details
- Country: Indonesia
- Dates: 2 March – 12 April 2019
- Teams: 20

Final positions
- Champions: Arema (2nd title)
- Runner-up: Persebaya
- Semifinalists: Kalteng Putra; Madura United

Tournament statistics
- Matches played: 40
- Goals scored: 124 (3.1 per match)
- Attendance: 487,727 (12,193 per match)
- Top goal scorer(s): Bruno Matos; Ricky Kayame; Manuchekhr Dzhalilov (5 goals each)

Awards
- Best player: Hamka Hamzah
- Goals scored in penalty shoot-outs are not included.

The 2019 Indonesia President's Cup (Indonesian: Piala Presiden 2019) was the fourth edition of Indonesia President's Cup, held by the Football Association of Indonesia (PSSI) as a pre-season tournament for the 2019 Liga 1. The tournament started on 2 March and finished on 12 April 2019.

Persija were the defending champions, but they were eliminated in the quarter-finals by Kalteng Putra.

Arema won the finals 4–2 on aggregate against Persebaya for their second Indonesia President's Cup title.

== Teams ==
The following 20 teams (18 from Liga 1 and two from Liga 2) participated for the tournament.

Team	Appearance	Last appearance	Previous best performance	2018 season league ranking
Arema	4th	2018	Winners (2017)	6th in Liga 1
Bali United	4th	2018	Runners-up (2018)	11th in Liga 1
Barito Putera	3rd	2018	Group stage (2017, 2018)	9th in Liga 1
Bhayangkara	4th	2018	Quarter-finals (2015, (Note: As Persebaya United) 2017)	3rd in Liga 1
Borneo	4th	2018	Runners-up (2017)	7th in Liga 1
Kalteng Putra	2nd	2018	Group stage (2018)	3rd in Liga 2
Madura United	4th	2018	Quarter-finals (2017, 2018)	8th in Liga 1
Mitra Kukar	4th	2018	Fourth place (2015)	16th in Liga 1
Persebaya	2nd	2018	Quarter-finals (2018)	5th in Liga 1
Persela	4th	2018	Group stage (2015, 2017, 2018)	13th in Liga 1
Perseru	3rd	2018	Group stage (2017, 2018)	14th in Liga 1
Persib	4th	2018	Winners (2015)	4th in Liga 1
Persija	4th	2018	Winners (2018)	1st in Liga 1
Persipura	2nd	2017	Group stage (2017)	12th in Liga 1
Persita	2nd	2015	Group stage (2015)	4th in Liga 2
PSIS	2nd	2018	Group stage (2018)	10th in Liga 1
PSM	4th	2018	Quarter-finals (2015)	2nd in Liga 1
PSS	2nd	2017	Group stage (2017)	1st in Liga 2
Semen Padang	2nd	2017	Fourth place (2017)	2nd in Liga 2
TIRA-Persikabo	3rd	2018	Group stage (2017, 2018)	15th in Liga 1

== Draw ==
The draw of the tournament was held on 19 February 2019 at the Sultan Hotel, Senayan in Jakarta. The draw resulted in the following groups:

Group A
Pos	Team
A1	Persib (Host)
A2	TIRA-Persikabo
A3	Perseru
A4	Persebaya

Group B
Pos	Team
B1	Bhayangkara (Host)
B2	Semen Padang
B3	Bali United
B4	Mitra Kukar

Group C
Pos	Team
C1	PSIS (Host)
C2	Persipura
C3	PSM
C4	Kalteng Putra

Group D
Pos	Team
D1	PSS (Host)
D2	Madura United
D3	Persija
D4	Borneo

Group E
Pos	Team
E1	Arema (Host)
E2	Barito Putera
E3	Persita
E4	Persela

== Venues ==
Unlike the previous three seasons, all the venues for the group stage were on the Java Island. The five venues that use for the group stage of the tournament were Patriot Candrabhaga Stadium in Bekasi, Jalak Harupat Stadium in Bandung, Moch. Soebroto Stadium in Magelang, Maguwoharjo Stadium in Sleman, and Kanjuruhan Stadium in Malang.

Bandung	Magelang	Sleman	Malang	Bekasi
Jalak Harupat Stadium	Moch. Soebroto Stadium	Maguwoharjo Stadium	Kanjuruhan Stadium	Patriot Candrabhaga Stadium
Capacity: 27,000	Capacity: 20,000	Capacity: 31,700	Capacity: 42,449	Capacity: 30,000
2019 Indonesia President's Cup is located in Java

== Format ==
In this tournament, 20 teams were drawn into five groups consisting of four teams each. The teams in each group would play a round robin system. After the group stage, the five group winners and three best runners-up would advance to the knockout stage, starting with the quarter-finals. If the quarter-final matches were held in one venue in the previous season, then the matches would be held in group stage winners' home stadium according to the quarter-finals drawing results this season. Two teams qualified for the finals would be played two-legged fixtures and there was no third-place play-off match.

== Group stage ==
The top teams of each group and the three best runner-up teams advanced to the quarter-finals.

All times are local, WIB (UTC+7).

=== Group A ===
Pos	Team	Pld	W	D	L	GF	GA	GD	Pts	Qualification
1	Persebaya	3	2	1	0	6	4	+2	7	Knockout stage
2	TIRA-Persikabo	3	2	1	0	5	3	+2	7	Knockout stage
3	Persib (H)	3	1	0	2	7	5	+2	3	
4	Perseru	3	0	0	3	4	10	−6	0	

Source: Piala Presiden
Rules for classification: 1) Points; 2) Head-to-head; 3) Goal difference; 4) Goals scored; 5) Drawing.
(H) Hosts
2 March 2019
16:00

Persib	1–2	TIRA-Persikabo
K. Kurniawan 49'	Report	Saha 29', 70'

Jalak Harupat Stadium, Bandung
Attendance: 26,541
Referee: Dwi Purba
2 March 2019
19:00

Perseru	2–3	Persebaya
Akbar 34'; Delvin 39'	Report	Baldé 63', 88'; Dzhalilov 90'

Jalak Harupat Stadium, Bandung
Attendance: 7,850
Referee: Wawan Rapiko

7 March 2019
15:30

Persebaya	3–2	Persib
Dzhalilov 37', 50'; Irfan 77'	Report	Erwin 32'; Frets 86'

Jalak Harupat Stadium, Bandung
Attendance: 26,978
Referee: Nusur Fadillah
7 March 2019
18:30

TIRA-Persikabo	3–2	Perseru
Saha 25'; Ciro 45'; Arnaud 57'	Report	Akbar 27'; Diakité 69'

Jalak Harupat Stadium, Bandung
Attendance: 951
Referee: Yeni Krisdianto

12 March 2019
15:30

TIRA-Persikabo	0–0	Persebaya
	Report

Jalak Harupat Stadium, Bandung
Attendance: 1,462
Referee: Nusur Fadillah
12 March 2019
18:30

Persib	4–0	Perseru
Erwin 54'; N'Douassel 69' (pen.); Henhen 85'; Frets 90+3'	Report

Jalak Harupat Stadium, Bandung
Attendance: 2,516
Referee: Rully Ruslin Tambutina

=== Group B ===
Pos	Team	Pld	W	D	L	GF	GA	GD	Pts	Qualification
1	Bhayangkara (H)	3	3	0	0	10	4	+6	9	Knockout stage
2	Bali United	3	2	0	1	6	5	+1	6	
3	Semen Padang	3	1	0	2	5	6	−1	3	
4	Mitra Kukar	3	0	0	3	1	7	−6	0	

Source: Piala Presiden
Rules for classification: 1) Points; 2) Head-to-head; 3) Goal difference; 4) Goals scored; 5) Drawing.
(H) Hosts
3 March 2019
15:30

Bhayangkara	4–2	Semen Padang
Anderson 9'; Dendy 67'; Armaiyn 79'; Hargianto 89'	Report	Juffo 63'; Zitte 81'

Patriot Candrabhaga Stadium, Bekasi
Attendance: 2,361
Referee: Thoriq Alkatiri
3 March 2019
18:30

Bali United	3–0	Mitra Kukar
Platje 3', 17'; Spasojević 27'	Report

Patriot Candrabhaga Stadium, Bekasi
Attendance: 735
Referee: Hadiyana

11 March 2019
15:30

Mitra Kukar	1–2	Bhayangkara
Faris 11'	Report	Anderson 52' (pen.); Dzumafo 74'

Patriot Candrabhaga Stadium, Bekasi
Attendance: 627
Referee: Nendi Rohaendi
11 March 2019
18:30

Semen Padang	1–2	Bali United
Dedi 17'	Report	Platje 5'; Fadil 8'

Patriot Candrabhaga Stadium, Bekasi
Attendance: 932
Referee: Tabrani

14 March 2019
15:30

Semen Padang	2–0	Mitra Kukar
Irsyad 26'; Juffo 50'	Report

Patriot Candrabhaga Stadium, Bekasi
Attendance: 233
Referee: Suhardiyanto
14 March 2019
18:30

Bhayangkara	4–1	Bali United
Anderson 45+5' (pen.); Mofu 49'; Dendy 62'; Hidayat 76'	Report	Platje 80'

Patriot Candrabhaga Stadium, Bekasi
Attendance: 738
Referee: Hadiyana

=== Group C ===
Pos	Team	Pld	W	D	L	GF	GA	GD	Pts	Qualification
1	Kalteng Putra	3	2	0	1	4	2	+2	6 (Note: Head-to-head goal difference: Kalteng Putra +1, Persipura 0, PSIS −1)	Knockout stage
2	Persipura	3	2	0	1	5	4	+1	6	
3	PSIS (H)	3	2	0	1	3	3	0	6	
4	PSM	3	0	0	3	0	3	−3	0	

Source: Piala Presiden
Rules for classification: 1) Points; 2) Head-to-head; 3) Goal difference; 4) Goals scored; 5) Drawing.
(H) Hosts
Notes:
6 March 2019
15:30

PSM	0–1	Kalteng Putra
	Report	Antony 63'

Moch. Soebroto Stadium, Magelang
Attendance: 371
Referee: Oki Dwi Putra
6 March 2019
18:30

PSIS	1–3	Persipura
Claudir 50'	Report	Bonai 11'; I. Wanggai 45+1'; Boaz 76'

Moch. Soebroto Stadium, Magelang
Attendance: 4,524
Referee: Faulur Rosy

10 March 2019
15:30

Persipura	1–0	PSM
Boaz 88'	Report

Moch. Soebroto Stadium, Magelang
Attendance: 442
Referee: Fariq Hitaba
10 March 2019
18:30

Kalteng Putra	0–1	PSIS
	Report	Heru 90'

Moch. Soebroto Stadium, Magelang
Attendance: 6,290
Referee: Musthofa Umarella

16 March 2019
15:30

Persipura	1–3	Kalteng Putra
Pilar 69'	Report	P. Wanggai 71', 73'; Rumere 78'

Moch. Soebroto Stadium, Magelang
Attendance: 624
Referee: Faulur Rosy
16 March 2019
18:30

PSIS	1–0	PSM
Claudir 84' (pen.)	Report

Moch. Soebroto Stadium, Magelang
Attendance: 10,960
Referee: Oki Dwi Putra

=== Group D ===
Pos	Team	Pld	W	D	L	GF	GA	GD	Pts	Qualification
1	Persija	3	2	1	0	9	2	+7	7	Knockout stage
2	Madura United	3	2	1	0	5	2	+3	7	Knockout stage
3	PSS (H)	3	1	0	2	2	4	−2	3	
4	Borneo	3	0	0	3	0	8	−8	0	

Source: Piala Presiden
Rules for classification: 1) Points; 2) Head-to-head; 3) Goal difference; 4) Goals scored; 5) Drawing.
(H) Hosts
5 March 2019
15:30

PSS	0–2	Madura United
	Report	Beto 11'; Alfath 87'

Maguwoharjo Stadium, Sleman
Attendance: 2,541
Referee: Aprisman Aranda
5 March 2019
18:30

Persija	5–0	Borneo
Novri 15', 23'; Matos 19'; Ramdani 50'; Heri 90'	Report

Maguwoharjo Stadium, Sleman
Attendance: 7,380
Referee: Handri Kristanto

8 March 2019
15:30

Madura United	2–2	Persija
Rakić 36', 68'	Report	Matos 52'; Ryuji 59'

Maguwoharjo Stadium, Sleman
Attendance: 6,299
Referee: Adi Riyanto
8 March 2019
18:30

Borneo	0–2	PSS
	Report	Ferreira 22'; Kushedya 90+4'

Maguwoharjo Stadium, Sleman
Attendance: 13,182
Referee: Asep Yandis

15 March 2019
15:30

Madura United	1–0	Borneo
David 76'	Report

Maguwoharjo Stadium, Sleman
Attendance: 375
Referee: Andi Asri Azis
15 March 2019
18:30

PSS	0–2	Persija
	Report	Matos 59', 86' (pen.)

Maguwoharjo Stadium, Sleman
Attendance: 29,150
Referee: Handri Kristanto

=== Group E ===
Pos	Team	Pld	W	D	L	GF	GA	GD	Pts	Qualification
1	Persela	3	2	1	0	4	1	+3	7	Knockout stage
2	Arema (H)	3	2	0	1	9	4	+5	6	Knockout stage
3	Barito Putera	3	1	1	1	6	5	+1	4	
4	Persita	3	0	0	3	2	11	−9	0	

Source: Piala Presiden
Rules for classification: 1) Points; 2) Head-to-head; 3) Goal difference; 4) Goals scored; 5) Drawing.
(H) Hosts
4 March 2019
15:30

Persita	0–2	Persela
	Report	Malik 61'; Hirose 79'

Kanjuruhan Stadium, Malang
Attendance: 651
Referee: Ikhsan Prasetya Jati
4 March 2019
18:30

Arema	3–2	Barito Putera
Dedik 78', 90+5'; Hardianto 90+1'	Report	Sayuri 64'; Evan 66'

Kanjuruhan Stadium, Malang
Attendance: 6,879
Referee: Yudi Nurcahya

9 March 2019
15:30

Barito Putera	3–1	Persita
Artur 29'; Gavin 35', 82'	Report	Chandra 77'

Kanjuruhan Stadium, Malang
Attendance: 566
Referee: Annas Apriliandi
9 March 2019
18:30

Persela	1–0	Arema
Brandão 41'	Report

Kanjuruhan Stadium, Malang
Attendance: 28,311
Referee: Agus Fauzan Arifin

13 March 2019
15:30

Barito Putera	1–1	Persela
Gavin 12'	Report	Brandão 24' (pen.)

Kanjuruhan Stadium, Malang
Attendance: 1,185
Referee: Ikhsan Prasetya Jati
13 March 2019
18:30

Arema	6–1	Persita
Konaté 33'; Ohorella 45+1'; Hendro 62'; Arthur 67'; Hamka 73'; Kayame 90+1'	Report	Henry 84'

Kanjuruhan Stadium, Malang
Attendance: 8,245
Referee: Mochammad Adung

=== Ranking of runners-up ===
Pos	Grp	Team	Pld	W	D	L	GF	GA	GD	Pts	Qualification
1	D	Madura United	3	2	1	0	5	2	+3	7	Knockout stage
2	A	TIRA-Persikabo	3	2	1	0	5	3	+2	7	Knockout stage
3	E	Arema	3	2	0	1	9	4	+5	6	Knockout stage
4	B	Bali United	3	2	0	1	6	5	+1	6	
5	C	Persipura	3	2	0	1	5	4	+1	6	

Source: Piala Presiden
Rules for classification: 1) Points; 2) Goal difference; 3) Goals scored; 4) Drawing.

== Knockout stage ==
Referring to tournament regulations, the teams entitled to host the quarter-finals were the four best group winners. Therefore, Bhayangkara, Persija, Persela, and Persebaya were the hosts. The draw for the quarter-finals was held on 19 March 2019 at Sultan Hotel, Senayan in Jakarta.

Extra time would not be played in the quarter-finals. If a match ended with a draw, it would go straight to a penalty shoot-out to determine the winner. The away goals rule, extra time and a penalty shoot-out would be used in the semi-finals and finals, if necessary.

All times are local, WIB (UTC+7).

=== Bracket ===
Quarter-finals
29 March – Surabaya
Persebaya	3
TIRA-Persikabo	1
31 March – Lamongan
Persela	1
Madura United	2
30 March – Bekasi
Bhayangkara	0
Arema	4
28 March – Bekasi
Persija	1 (3)
Kalteng Putra (p)	1 (4)

Semi-finals
3/6 April
Persebaya	1	3	4
Madura United	0	2	2
2/5 April
Arema	3	3	6
Kalteng Putra	0	0	0

Finals
9/12 April
Persebaya	2	0	2
Arema	2	2	4

=== Quarter-finals ===
29 March 2019
15:30

Persebaya	3–1	TIRA-Persikabo
Dzhalilov 2'; Lizio 89' (pen.); Baldé 90'	Report	Saha 62'

Gelora Bung Tomo Stadium, Surabaya
Attendance: 43,230
Referee: Handri Kristanto

31 March 2019
15:30

Persela	1–2	Madura United
Brandão 5'	Report	Beto 4'; Rakić 8'

Surajaya Stadium, Lamongan
Attendance: 16,000
Referee: Musthofa Umarella

30 March 2019
15:30

Bhayangkara	0–4	Arema
	Report	Konaté 10', 78'; Hamka 40'; Kayame 90+4'

Patriot Candrabhaga Stadium, Bekasi
Attendance: 8,518
Referee: Oki Dwi Putra

28 March 2019
15:30

Persija	1–1	Kalteng Putra
Matos 77'	Report	P. Wanggai 56'
Penalties
Ismed (penalty scored); Fitra (penalty missed); Chand (penalty scored); Matos (penalty missed); Ryuji (penalty scored)	3–4	(penalty missed) Sukadana; (penalty scored) Pahabol; (penalty scored) John; (penalty scored) Rizky Dwi; (penalty scored) Campos

Patriot Candrabhaga Stadium, Bekasi
Attendance: 27,948
Referee: Thoriq Alkatiri

=== Semi-finals ===
3 April 2019
15:30

Persebaya	1–0	Madura United
Dzhalilov 64'	Report

Gelora Bung Tomo Stadium, Surabaya
Attendance: 50,000
Referee: Agus Fauzan Arifin
6 April 2019
19:00

Madura United	2–3	Persebaya
Rakić 54'; Beto 68'	Report	Dutra 61'; Baldé 82'; Hansamu 90+4'

Gelora Ratu Pamelingan Stadium, Pamekasan
Attendance: 12,860
Referee: Yudi Nurcahya

Persebaya won 4–2 on aggregate.

2 April 2019
19:00

Arema	3–0	Kalteng Putra
Kayame 28'; Hanif 61'; Dedik 67'	Report

Kanjuruhan Stadium, Malang
Attendance: 29,285
Referee: Fariq Hitaba
5 April 2019
19:00

Kalteng Putra	0–3	Arema
	Report	Dedik 10'; Alfarizi 20'; Kayame 40'

May 17th Stadium, Banjarmasin
Attendance: 7,987
Referee: Nusur Fadillah

Arema won 6–0 on aggregate.

=== Finals ===
9 April 2019
15:30

Persebaya	2–2	Arema
Irfan 7'; Lizio 72' (pen.)	Report	Hendro 33'; Konaté 79'

Gelora Bung Tomo Stadium, Surabaya
Attendance: 50,000
Referee: Oki Dwi Putra
12 April 2019
20:00

Arema	2–0	Persebaya
Hardianto 43'; Kayame 90+2'	Report

Kanjuruhan Stadium, Malang
Attendance: 42,000
Referee: Nusur Fadillah

Arema won 4–2 on aggregate.

== Statistics ==
=== Goalscorers ===
There were 124 goals scored in 40 matches, for an average of 3.1 goals per match.

5 goals

- (Brazil) Bruno Matos
- (Indonesia) Ricky Kayame
- (Tajikistan) Manuchekhr Dzhalilov

4 goals

- (Guinea-Bissau) Amido Baldé
- (Indonesia) Dedik Setiawan
- (Indonesia) Osas Saha
- (Mali) Makan Konaté
- (Netherlands) Melvin Platje
- (Serbia) Aleksandar Rakić

3 goals

- (Brazil) Anderson Salles
- (Brazil) Washington Brandão
- (Indonesia) Beto Gonçalves
- (Indonesia) Gavin Kwan
- (Indonesia) Patrich Wanggai

2 goals

- (Bolivia) Damián Lizio
- (Brazil) Claudir
- (Brazil) Victor Juffo
- (Indonesia) Ahmad Hardianto
- (Indonesia) Akbar Munir
- (Indonesia) Boaz Solossa
- (Indonesia) Dendy Sulistyawan
- (Indonesia) Erwin Ramdani
- (Indonesia) Frets Butuan
- (Indonesia) Hamka Hamzah
- (Indonesia) Hendro Siswanto
- (Indonesia) Irfan Jaya
- (Indonesia) Novri Setiawan

1 goal

- (Brazil) Arthur Cunha
- (Brazil) Artur Vieira
- (Brazil) Ciro Alves
- (Brazil) Luis Pilar
- (Brazil) Otávio Dutra
- (Chad) Ezechiel N'Douassel
- (France) Florent Zitte
- (France) Loris Arnaud
- (Indonesia) Achmad Faris
- (Indonesia) Alfath Fathier
- (Indonesia) Antony Nugroho
- (Indonesia) Chandra Waskito
- (Indonesia) David Laly
- (Indonesia) Dedi Hartono
- (Indonesia) Delvin Rumbino
- (Indonesia) Evan Dimas
- (Indonesia) Fadil Sausu
- (Indonesia) Hanif Sjahbandi
- (Indonesia) Hansamu Yama
- (Indonesia) Henhen Herdiana
- (Indonesia) Henry Rivaldi
- (Indonesia) Heri Susanto
- (Indonesia) Herman Dzumafo
- (Indonesia) Heru Setyawan
- (Indonesia) Ilham Armaiyn
- (Indonesia) Ilija Spasojević
- (Indonesia) Imanuel Wanggai
- (Indonesia) Irsyad Maulana
- (Indonesia) Johan Alfarizi
- (Indonesia) Kim Kurniawan
- (Indonesia) Kushedya Hari Yudo
- (Indonesia) Malik Risaldi
- (Indonesia) Michael Rumere
- (Indonesia) Muhammad Hargianto
- (Indonesia) Rachmad Hidayat
- (Indonesia) Ramdani Lestaluhu
- (Indonesia) Ricky Ohorella
- (Indonesia) Ryuji Utomo
- (Indonesia) Titus Bonai
- (Indonesia) Vendry Mofu
- (Indonesia) Yakob Sayuri
- (Iraq) Brian Ferreira
- (Japan) Kei Hirose
- (Mali) Seydou Diakité

=== Awards ===
- Best supporter was awarded to Persija's supporter, The Jak Mania.
- Best referee was awarded to Nusur Fadillah.
- Best young player was awarded to Irfan Jaya (Persebaya).
- Top scorer were awarded to Bruno Matos (Persija), Manuchekhr Dzhalilov (Persebaya), and Ricky Kayame (Arema) with five goals each.
- Fair play team was awarded to Persija.
- Best player was awarded to Hamka Hamzah (Arema).

=== Tournament team rankings ===
As per statistical convention in football, matches decided in extra time were counted as wins and losses, while matches decided by penalty shoot-outs were counted as draws.

Pos	Grp	Team	Pld	W	D	L	GF	GA	GD	Pts	Final result
1	E	Arema	8	6	1	1	23	6	+17	19	Champion
2	A	Persebaya	8	5	2	1	15	11	+4	17	Runner-up
3	D	Madura United	6	3	1	2	9	7	+2	10	Eliminated in the semi-finals
4	C	Kalteng Putra	6	2	1	3	5	9	−4	7	Eliminated in the semi-finals
5	B	Bhayangkara	4	3	0	1	10	8	+2	9	Eliminated in the quarter-finals
6	D	Persija	4	2	2	0	10	3	+7	8	Eliminated in the quarter-finals
7	E	Persela	4	2	1	1	5	3	+2	7	Eliminated in the quarter-finals
8	A	TIRA-Persikabo	4	2	1	1	6	6	0	7	Eliminated in the quarter-finals
9	B	Bali United	3	2	0	1	6	5	+1	6	Eliminated in the group stage
10	C	Persipura	3	2	0	1	5	4	+1	6	Eliminated in the group stage
11	C	PSIS	3	2	0	1	3	3	0	6	Eliminated in the group stage
12	E	Barito Putera	3	1	1	1	6	5	+1	4	Eliminated in the group stage
13	A	Persib	3	1	0	2	7	5	+2	3	Eliminated in the group stage
14	B	Semen Padang	3	1	0	2	5	6	−1	3	Eliminated in the group stage
15	D	PSS	3	1	0	2	2	4	−2	3	Eliminated in the group stage
16	C	PSM	3	0	0	3	0	3	−3	0	Eliminated in the group stage
17	A	Perseru	3	0	0	3	4	10	−6	0	Eliminated in the group stage
18	B	Mitra Kukar	3	0	0	3	1	7	−6	0	Eliminated in the group stage
19	D	Borneo	3	0	0	3	0	8	−8	0	Eliminated in the group stage
20	E	Persita	3	0	0	3	2	11	−9	0	Eliminated in the group stage

Source: Group stage, Knockout stage
