= 2014 Indonesian Inter Island Cup qualification =

2014 Inter Island Cup qualification
Tournament details
- Host country: Indonesia
- Dates: 10–16 January
- Teams: 22
- Venues: 7 (in 7 host cities)

Tournament statistics
- Matches played: 32
- Goals scored: 96 (3 per match)
- Top scorer(s): (Nigeria) Osas Saha (6 goals)

The 2014 Indonesian Inter Island Cup qualification tournament was the qualification process for the 2014 Inter Island Cup, the third edition of the Indonesian Inter Island Cup. It was held from 10 January to 16 January 2014, and involved the 22 teams in 2014 Indonesia Super League. The format was a single round-robin tournament.

The Kalimantan and Sulawesi-Papua zones were divided into two group each filled with four teams, with the top two teams in each zone qualifying for the tournament proper. For the Sumatra zone followed by Sriwijaya and Semen Padang, they played home-and-away system, with the winner qualifying for the tournament proper. For the Java zone, the 12 participating clubs were divided into three groups of four with the round robin system, and the winner from each group entered the tournament proper.

The draw for the tournament as well as the qualification tournament took place on 30 December 2013. PT Liga Indonesia officially announced Bandung Regency, Malang Regency, Surabaya, Banjar Regency and Jayapura as the hosts on 30 December 2013. PT Liga Indonesia decided to appoint Kediri replace Surabaya to host group 3 of the Java zone, because the police did not give permission to hold the match in Surabaya.

All times listed are local (UTC+07:00 (Western Indonesia Time), UTC+08:00 (Central Indonesia Time) and UTC+09:00 (East Indonesia Time)).

== Venues ==
Seven locations were presented as potential Inter Island Cup qualification host cities: Palembang, Padang, Bandung Regency, Malang Regency, Surabaya, Banjar Regency and Jayapura.

Padang, WS	Palembang, SS	Bandung Regency, WS	Kediri, EJ	Malang Regency, EJ	Banjar Regency, SK	Jayapura, PA
Haji Agus Salim Stadium	Gelora Sriwijaya Stadium	Si Jalak Harupat Stadium	Brawijaya Stadium	Kanjuruhan Stadium	Demang Lehman Stadium	Mandala Stadium
00°55′46″S 100°21′30″E	3°01′17″S 104°47′21″E	06°59′48″S 107°31′47″E	7.817041°S 112.028602°E	08°08′58″S 112°34′26″E	0.58617°S 117.13160°E	2°31′50″S 140°43′25″E
Capacity: 15,000	Capacity: 40,000	Capacity: 40,000	Capacity: 20,000	Capacity: 35,000	Capacity: 6,500	Capacity: 30,000
2014 Indonesian Inter Island Cup qualification is located in Indonesia

== Squads ==
Each team named a minimum of 18 players in their squads (three of whom were goalkeepers) by the deadline that Liga Indonesia determined was on 7 January 2014. Injury replacements were allowed until 24 hours before the team's first match.

== Tie-breaking criteria ==
Ranking in each group shall be determined as follows:

1. Greater number of points obtained in all group matches;
2. Result of the direct match between the teams in question;
3. Goal difference in all group matches;
4. Greater number of goals scored in all group matches.

If two or more teams are equal on the basis on the above four criteria, the place shall be determined as follows:

1. Kicks from the penalty mark if the teams in question are still on the field of play;
2. Drawing of lots by the Organising Committee.

== Sumatra ==
Sriwijaya and Semen Padang played home-and-away system, with the winner qualifying for the tournament proper. Matches were played on 10 and 14 January 2014.

Team 1	Agg.	Team 2	1st leg	2nd leg
Semen Padang	2 – 4	Sriwijaya	1 – 1	1 – 3

=== Result ===
First Leg

10 January 2014
16:00 UTC+7

Semen Padang	1 – 1	Sriwijaya
Ohorella 44'	Report	Radovanović 42'

Haji Agus Salim Stadium, Padang
Attendance: 9,872
Referee: Hadiyana

Second Leg

14 January 2014
15:30 UTC+7

Sriwijaya	3 – 1	Semen Padang
Koné 1'; Anis 40'; Siswanto 59'	Report	Airlangga 58'

Gelora Sriwijaya Stadium, Palembang
Attendance: 24,630
Referee: Handri Kristanto

== Java ==
In the Java zone, the 12 participating clubs were divided into three groups of four, and the winner from each group entered the tournament proper. This zone was played on 10 to 16 January 2014.

=== Group 1 ===
- All matches were played in Bandung Regency, on 13 to 16 January 2014.
- Times listed are UTC+7.

Pos	Team	Pld	W	D	L	GF	GA	GD	Pts	Qualification
1	Persib Bandung	3	3	0	0	10	1	+9	9	2014 Inter Island Cup
2	Pelita Bandung Raya	3	1	1	1	2	2	0	4	
3	Persita Tangerang	3	1	0	2	3	8	−5	3	
4	Persijap Jepara	3	0	1	2	1	5	−4	1	

13 January 2014
15:30

Persib Bandung	7 – 1	Persita Tangerang
Jufriyanto 19'; Coulibaly 41'; Utina 57'; Konaté 73'; Atep 76', 87', 99'	Report	Adachihara 53'

Jalak Harupat Stadium, Bandung Regency
Attendance: 15,643
13 January 2014
19:00

Pelita Bandung Raya	1 – 1	Persijap Jepara
Pellu 80'	Report	Evaldo Silva 28'

Jalak Harupat Stadium, Bandung Regency
Attendance: 756
Referee: P Hadi

14 January 2014
15:30

Persita Tangerang	0 – 1	Pelita Bandung Raya
	Report	Gaston 65'

Jalak Harupat Stadium, Bandung Regency
Attendance: 5,756
14 January 2014
19:00

Persijap Jepara	0 – 2	Persib Bandung
	Report	Ridwan 50'; Sinaga 78'

Jalak Harupat Stadium, Bandung Regency
Attendance: 22,876
Referee: E Sembiring

16 January 2014
15:30

Persita Tangerang	2 – 0	Persijap Jepara
Cristian Carrasco 13' (pen.), 70'	Report

Jalak Harupat Stadium, Bandung Regency
Attendance: 3,711
Referee: M Adung
16 January 2014
19:00

Persib Bandung	1 – 0	Pelita Bandung Raya
Jufriyanto 68'	Report

Jalak Harupat Stadium, Bandung Regency
Attendance: 22,457
Referee: P Hadi

=== Group 2 ===
- All matches were played in Malang Regency, on 10 to 13 January 2014.
- Times listed are UTC+7.

Pos	Team	Pld	W	D	L	GF	GA	GD	Pts	Qualification
1	Arema Cronous	3	3	0	0	7	1	+6	9	2014 Inter Island Cup
2	Persela Lamongan	3	1	1	1	3	3	0	4	
3	Persija Jakarta	3	0	2	1	2	4	−2	2	
4	Persepam Madura United	3	0	1	2	2	6	−4	1	

10 January 2014
15:30

Arema Cronous	3 – 1	Persepam Madura United
Maulana 4'; Beto 36'; Gustavo López 75' (pen.)	Report	Escobar 57'

Kanjuruhan Stadium, Malang Regency
Attendance: 7,354
Referee: Thoriq M. Alkatiri
10 January 2014
19:00

Persija Jakarta	1 – 1	Persela Lamongan
Mario Costas 84' (pen.)	Report	Addison 62'

Kanjuruhan Stadium, Malang Regency
Attendance: 1,376
Referee: Kusni

11 January 2014
15:30

Persepam Madura United	1 – 1	Persija Jakarta
Escobar 72'	Report	Mario Costas 60'

Kanjuruhan Stadium, Malang Regency
Attendance: 1,036
Referee: Ahmad Suparman
11 January 2014
19:00

Persela Lamongan	0 – 2	Arema Cronous
	Report	Gonzáles 7'; Ginarsa 31'

Kanjuruhan Stadium, Malang Regency
Attendance: 10,237
Referee: Jerry Elly

13 January 2014
15:30

Persepam Madura United	0 – 2	Persela Lamongan
	Report	Lopičić 12' (pen.); Addison 57'

Kanjuruhan Stadium, Malang Regency
Attendance: 3,421
Referee: Jerry Elly
13 January 2014
19:00

Arema Cronous	2 – 0	Persija Jakarta
Beto 32', 61'	Report

Kanjuruhan Stadium, Malang Regency
Attendance: 24,387
Referee: Kusni

=== Group 3 ===
- All matches were played in Kediri, on 12 to 15 January 2014.
- Times listed are UTC+7.

Pos	Team	Pld	W	D	L	GF	GA	GD	Pts	Qualification
1	Persik Kediri	3	3	0	0	5	2	+3	9	2014 Inter Island Cup
2	Persebaya ISL/Bhayangkara FC	3	2	0	1	5	2	+3	6	
3	Gresik United	3	0	1	2	5	8	−3	1	
4	Persiba Bantul	3	0	1	2	4	7	−3	1	

12 January 2014
15:30

Persebaya ISL/Bhayangkara FC	2 – 0	Persiba Bantul
Nwokolo 29', 68'	Report

Brawijaya Stadium, Kediri
Attendance: 3,523
Referee: Oki Dwi Putra Senjaya
12 January 2014
19:00

Persik Kediri	2 – 1	Gresik United
Rendy Irawan 15', 44'	Report	Elthon Maran 79'

Brawijaya Stadium, Kediri
Attendance: 13,167
Referee: Muslimin

13 January 2014
15:30

Gresik United	1 – 3	Persebaya ISL/Bhayangkara FC
Pasarella 68'	Report	Nwokolo 69'; Casmir 81', 86'

Brawijaya Stadium, Kediri
Attendance: 551
Referee: Hamsir
13 January 2014
19:00

Persiba Bantul	1 – 2	Persik Kediri
Solechudin 30'	Report	Firasat 47'; Santoso 90+3'

Brawijaya Stadium, Kediri
Attendance: 5,733
Referee: Muslimin

15 January 2014
15:30

Persik Kediri	1 – 0	Persebaya ISL/Bhayangkara FC
Aditama 75'	Report

Brawijaya Stadium, Kediri
Attendance: 12,915
Referee: Oki Dwi Putra Senjaya
15 January 2014
19:00

Gresik United	3 – 3	Persiba Bantul
Matsunaga 5'; N'Diaye 31'; Suparno 59'	Report	Jejen 43'; Raharjo 48' (o.g.); Isnaini 67'

Brawijaya Stadium, Kediri
Attendance: 237
Referee: Hamsir

== Kalimantan ==
- All matches were played in Banjar Regency, on 10 to 13 January 2014.
- Times listed are UTC+8.

Pos	Team	Pld	W	D	L	GF	GA	GD	Pts	Qualification
1	Barito Putera	3	2	1	0	5	3	+2	7	2014 Inter Island Cup
2	Mitra Kukar	3	1	2	0	3	1	+2	5	2014 Inter Island Cup
3	Persiba Balikpapan	3	1	0	2	3	5	−2	3	
4	Putra Samarinda	3	0	1	2	4	6	−2	1	

10 January 2014
16:30

Barito Putera	3 – 2	Putra Samarinda
Herman 42'; Pahabol 67'; Bangura 90+2'	Report	Sasongko 49'; Spasojević 77'

Demang Lehman Stadium, Banjar Regency
Attendance: 5,800
Referee: Dodi Setia Purmana
10 January 2014
20:00

Mitra Kukar	2 – 0	Persiba Balikpapan
Zulham Zamrun 42', 90+1'	Report

Demang Lehman Stadium, Banjar Regency
Attendance: 3,000
Referee: Novari Ikhsan Arilaha

11 January 2014
16:30

Putra Samarinda	0 – 0	Mitra Kukar
	Report

Demang Lehman Stadium, Banjar Regency
Attendance: 1,005
Referee: Nusur Fadillah
11 January 2014
20:00

Persiba Balikpapan	0 – 1	Barito Putera
	Report	Bangura 22'

Demang Lehman Stadium, Banjar Regency
Attendance: 5,890
Referee: Solikin Solikin

13 January 2014
16:30

Putra Samarinda	2 – 3	Persiba Balikpapan
Gatra 81'; Engelbert 90+4'	Report	Toure 19'; Bahtiar 41'; Ozuna 81'

Demang Lehman Stadium, Banjar Regency
Attendance: 3,000
Referee: Dodi Setia Purnama
13 January 2014
20:00

Barito Putera	0 – 0	Mitra Kukar
	Report

Demang Lehman Stadium, Banjar Regency
Attendance: 7,300
Referee: Novari Ikhsan Arilaha

== Sulawesi-Papua ==
- All matches were played in Jayapura, on 10 to 13 January 2014.
- Times listed are UTC+9.

Pos	Team	Pld	W	D	L	GF	GA	GD	Pts	Qualification
1	Persiram Raja Ampat	3	2	1	0	8	6	+2	7	2014 Inter Island Cup
2	Perseru Serui	3	1	1	1	8	8	0	4 (Note: Tiebreakers: Perseru is ranked ahead of Persipura based on their head-to-head record.)	2014 Inter Island Cup
3	Persipura Jayapura	3	1	1	1	7	5	+2	4	
4	PSM Makassar	3	0	1	2	3	7	−4	1	

Notes:

Tiebreakers

- Perseru is ranked ahead of Persipura based on their head-to-head record.
10 January 2014
15:30

Persipura Jayapura	2 – 3	Perseru Serui
Pahabol 5'; Kabes 63'	Report	Oboh 52'; Bonai 57'; E. Boakay 70' (o.g.)

Mandala Stadium, Jayapura
Attendance: 15,137
Referee: Iwan Sukoco
10 January 2014
19:00

Persiram Raja Ampat	2 – 1	PSM Makassar
Osas Saha 43'; Quaiyan 89'	Report	Astaman 51'

Mandala Stadium, Jayapura
Attendance: 13,214
Referee: Djumadi Effendi

11 January 2014
15:30

Perseru Serui	3 – 4	Persiram Raja Ampat
Seme 25'; Oboh 45+2' (pen.), 61'	Report	Osas Saha 15' (pen.), 56', 80' (pen.), 88'

Mandala Stadium, Jayapura
Attendance: 12,147
Referee: Bahrul Ulum
11 January 2014
19:00

PSM Makassar	0 – 3	Persipura Jayapura
	Report	E. Boakay 5'; Bonai 42'; Kayame 76'

Mandala Stadium, Jayapura
Attendance: 8,203
Referee: Tabrani

13 January 2014
15:30

Perseru Serui	2 – 2	PSM Makassar
Oboh 83'; Seme 89'	Report	Rahman 63'; Tamarah 88'

Mandala Stadium, Jayapura
Attendance: 1,123
Referee: Iwan Sukoco
13 January 2014
19:00

Persipura Jayapura	2 – 2	Persiram Raja Ampat
Kabes 43'; Alom 58'	Report	Osas Saha 20'; Banggo 22'

Mandala Stadium, Jayapura
Attendance: 18,132
Referee: Bahrul Ulum

== Qualified teams ==
Team	Island	Qualified as	Appearance	Last Appearance
Persib Bandung	Java	Winner of Java Zone Group 1	3rd	2012
Arema Cronous	Java	Winner of Java Zone Group 2	3rd	2012
Persik Kediri	Java	Winner of Java Zone Group 3	1st	none
Barito Putera	Kalimantan	Winner of Kalimantan Zone	2nd	2012
Mitra Kukar	Kalimantan	Runner-up of Kalimantan Zone	2nd	2012
Sriwijaya	Sumatra	Winner of Sumatra Zone	3rd	2012
Persiram Raja Ampat	Sulawesi-Papua	Winner of Sulawesi-Papua Zone	1st	none
Perseru Serui	Sulawesi-Papua	Runner-up of Sulawesi-Papua Zone	1st	none

== Goal scorers ==
=== Top Scorers ===
Rank	Scorer	Club	Goals
1	(Nigeria) Osas Saha	Persiram Raja Ampat	6
2	(Nigeria) Sunday Austin Oboh	Perseru Serui	4
3	(Indonesia) Atep	Persib Bandung	3
3	(Indonesia) Greg Nwokolo	Persebaya Surabaya	3
3	(Brazil) Beto	Arema Cronous	3
6	(Argentina) Mario Costas	Persija Jakarta	2
6	(Brazil) Addison	Persela Lamongan	2
6	(Chile) Cristian Carrasco	Persita Tangerang	2
6	(Cameroon) Seme Pattrick	Perseru Serui	2
6	(Indonesia) Achmad Jufriyanto	Persib Bandung	2
6	(Indonesia) Ian Kabes	Persipura Jayapura	2
6	(Indonesia) Rendy Irawan	Persik Kediri	2
6	(Indonesia) Zulham Zamrun	Mitra Kukar	2
6	(Paraguay) Silvio Escobar	Madura United	2
6	(Singapore) Agu Casmir	Persebaya Surabaya	2
6	(Sierra Leone) Shaka Bangura	PS Barito Putera	2

=== Own Goals ===
Player	For	Club
(Liberia) Boakay Eddie Foday	Perseru Serui	Persipura Jayapura
(Indonesia) Legimin Raharjo	Persiba Bantul	Gresik United
