= 2015 Arema Cronus F.C. season =

Pelita Arema Cronus
2015 season
- Chairman: Iwan Budianto
- Head Coach: Suharno
- Stadium: Kanjuruhan
- Indonesia Super League: TBD
Home colours	Away colours	Third colours

The 2015 Arema Cronus season is the 27th season in the club's football history, the 10th consecutive season in the top-flight Liga Indonesia season and the 7th season competing in the Indonesia Super League.

== Review and events ==
=== May ===
The 2015 Indonesia Super League was officially discontinued by PSSI on May 2, 2015 due to a ban by Imam Nahrawi, Minister of Youth and Sports Affairs, against PSSI to run any football competition.

== Matches ==
=== Legend ===
Win Draw Loss Postponed

=== Friendlies ===
Date	KO	Stadium	City	Opponent	Result^{4}	Attendance	Goalscorers		Source
Date	KO	Stadium	City	Opponent	Result^{4}	Attendance	Arema Cronus	Opponent	Source
17 December 2014		H	Malang	PS UMM	8 – 0		Abblode 4', 26', 64', 71'; Siswanto 6'; Sunarto 41'; Suyono 79'; Santoso 82'		
19 December 2014		H	Malang	Malang Selatan Selection	11 – 0		Abblode; Kennedy; Sunarto; Suyono; Santoso; Noviandani; Gonzáles		
26 December 2014		H	Malang	UiTM	3 – 1		Abblode 13'; Gonzáles 61', 67'	Bakary 63'	
26 December 2014		A	Bojonegoro	Bojonegoro Selection	8 – 0		Arif; Sunarto; Suyono; Abblode; Wahyudi		
4 Januari 2014		H	Batu	Putra Jaya	8 – 0		Sunarto; Arif; Siswanto; Abblode; Kennedy; Santoso		
14 June 2015		H	Malang	Bali United	0 – 1			Sukarja 82'	

=== Indonesia Super League ===
Date	KO	Stadium	City	Opponent	Result^{4}	Attendance	Goalscorers		Source
Date	KO	Stadium	City	Opponent	Result^{4}	Attendance	Arema Cronus	Opponent	Source
5 April 2015	18:50	H	Malang	Persija Jakarta	4 – 4	22,619	Gonzáles 10'; Samsul 30'; Beltrame 38', 90+4' (pen.)	Pamungkas 19' (pen.), 29', 75'; Nwokolo 82'	
7 April 2015	21:00	H	Malang	Barito Putera	1 – 0	4,151	Beltrame 69' (pen.)		

== Statistics ==
=== Squad ===
As of 7 April 2015.

No.	Pos	Nat	Player	Total		Indonesia Super League		Piala Indonesia	
No.	Pos	Nat	Player	Apps	Goals	Apps	Goals	Apps	Goals
1	GK	(Indonesia) IDN	Kurnia Meiga	2	0	2	0	0	0
2	DF	(Indonesia) IDN	Purwaka Yudhi	1	0	1	0	0	0
6	DF	(Indonesia) IDN	Suroso	0	0	0	0	0	0
7	DF	(Indonesia) IDN	Benny Wahyudi	1	0	1	0	0	0
9	FW	(Indonesia) IDN	Samsul Arif	2	1	2	1	0	0
10	FW	(Indonesia) IDN	Cristian Gonzáles	2	1	2	1	0	0
12	MF	(Indonesia) IDN	Hendro Siswanto	1	0	1	0	0	0
14	MF	(Indonesia) IDN	Arif Suyono	1	0	1	0	0	0
15	DF	(Brazil) BRA	Fabiano Beltrame	2	3	2	3	0	0
17	MF	(Indonesia) IDN	Ahmad Noviandani	2	0	2	0	0	0
18	FW	(Indonesia) IDN	Sunarto	0	0	0	0	0	0
19	MF	(Indonesia) IDN	Ahmad Bustomi	2	0	2	0	0	0
21	GK	(Indonesia) IDN	I Made Wardana	1	0	1	0	0	0
22	MF	(Liberia) LBR	Sengbah Kennedy	1	0	1	0	0	0
23	DF	(Indonesia) IDN	Gilang Ginarsa	0	0	0	0	0	0
31	GK	(Indonesia) IDN	Achmad Kurniawan	0	0	0	0	0	0
32	DF	(Indonesia) IDN	Victor Igbonefo	2	0	2	0	0	0
41	FW	(Indonesia) IDN	Dendi Santoso	1	0	1	0	0	0
44	MF	(Indonesia) IDN	I Gede Sukadana	1	0	1	0	0	0
45	FW	(Liberia) LBR	Yao Rudy Abblode	0	0	0	0	0	0
59	DF	(Indonesia) IDN	Hasyim Kipuw	2	0	2	0	0	0
77	MF	(Indonesia) IDN	Juan Revi	1	0	1	0	0	0
87	DF	(Indonesia) IDN	Johan Alfarizi	1	0	1	0	0	0
89	MF	(Indonesia) IDN	Oky Derry Andryan	0	0	0	0	0	0
93	GK	(Indonesia) IDN	Utam Rusdiana	0	0	0	0	0	0
94	MF	(Indonesia) IDN	Feri Aman Saragih	2	0	2	0	0	0

=== Clean sheets ===
As of 7 April 2015.

Rnk	Pos	No.	Player	Indonesia Super League	Piala Indonesia	Total
1	GK	21	(Indonesia) I Made Wardana	1	0	1
Total				1	0	1

=== Disciplinary record ===
As of 7 April 2015.

Rnk	Pos.	No.	Player	ISL			Piala Indonesia			Total		
Rnk	Pos.	No.	Player	Yellow card	(yellow card) (yellow-red card)	Red card	Yellow card	(yellow card) (yellow-red card)	Red card	Yellow card	(yellow card) (yellow-red card)	Red card
1	DF	20	(Indonesia) Johan Alfarizi	0	0	1	0	0	0	0	0	1
2	DF	15	(Brazil) Fabiano Beltrame	2	0	0	0	0	0	2	0	0
3	DF	7	(Indonesia) Benny Wahyudi	1	0	0	0	0	0	1	0	0
3	GK	21	(Indonesia) I Made Wardana	1	0	0	0	0	0	1	0	0
3	DF	59	(Indonesia) Hasyim Kipuw	1	0	0	0	0	0	1	0	0
3	MF	94	(Indonesia) Feri Aman Saragih	1	0	0	0	0	0	1	0	0
Total				6	0	1	0	0	0	6	0	1

== Transfers ==
=== In ===
No.	Pos.	Name	Moving from	Type	Sources
	MF	(Indonesia) Ahmad Noviandani	Persijap Jepara	Released	
	DF	(Indonesia) Hasyim Kipuw	Persebaya United (Bhayangkara)	Released	
	DF	(Brazil) Fabiano Beltrame	Persija Jakarta	Released	
	DF	(Indonesia) Suroso	Persela Lamongan	Released	
	MF	(Liberia) Sengbah Kennedy	Persiwa Wamena	Released	
	FW	(Liberia) Yao Rudy Abblode	Persiwa Wamena	Released	

=== Out ===
No.	Pos.	Name	Moving to	Type	Sources
	MF	(Indonesia) Irsyad Maulana	Semen Padang	Released	
	DF	(Indonesia) Munhar	Persebaya United (Bhayangkara)	Released	

== Notes ==
- 1.Arema Cronus's goals first.
