= Ohorella =

Ohorella is a Moluccan surname. Notable people with the surname include:

- Ricky Ohorella (born 1990), Indonesian footballer
