= Ahmad Nufiandani =

Indonesian association football player

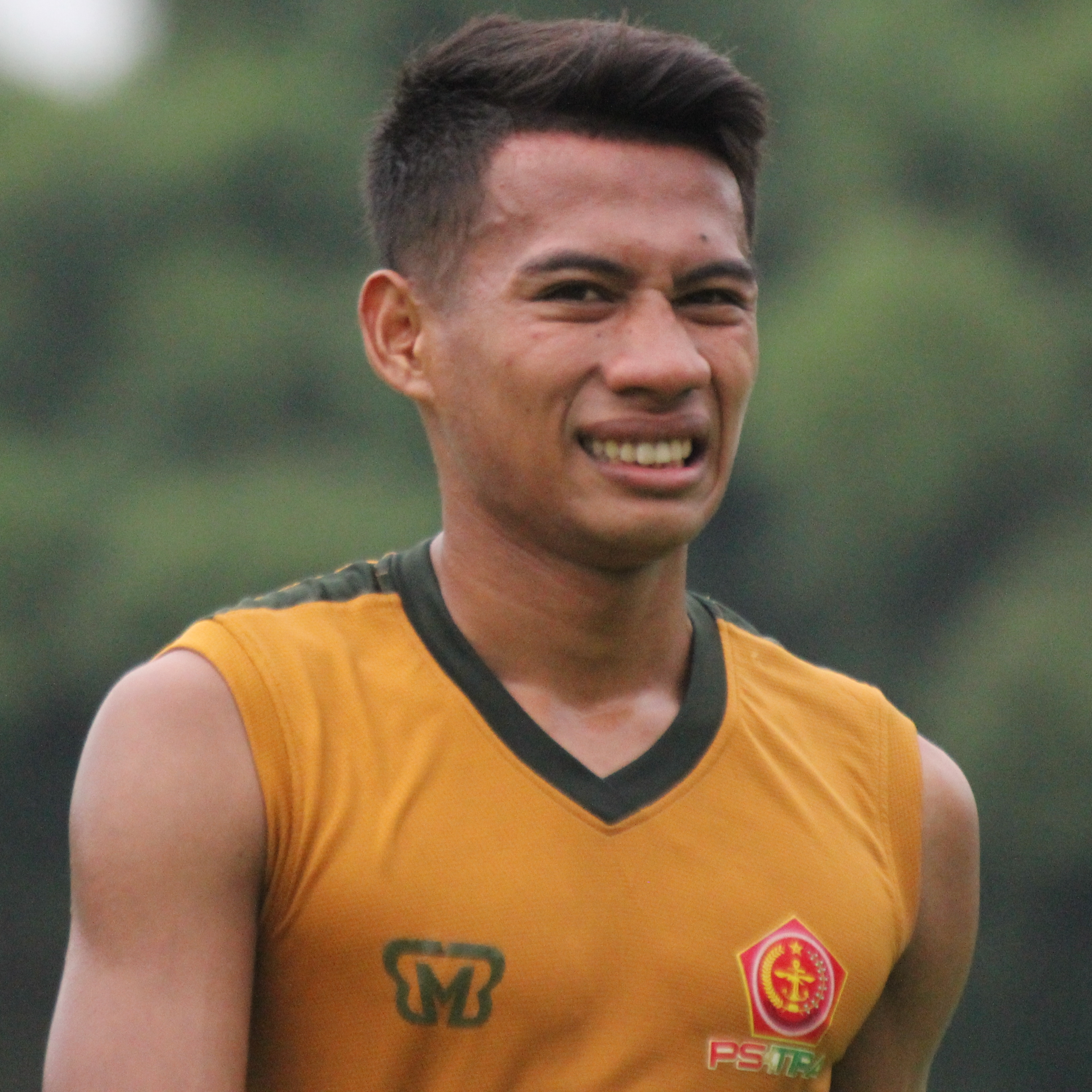
- Nufiandani with TIRA–Persikabo in 2019

Personal information
- Full name: Ahmad Nufiandani
- Date of birth: 20 November 1994 (age 31)
- Place of birth: Kediri, Indonesia
- Height: 1.68 m (5 ft 6 in)
- Position: Winger

Team information
- Current team: PSIS Semarang
- Number: 17

Youth career
- 2011–2012: Arema Indonesia
- 2012–2013: Persijap Jepara

Senior career*
Years	Team	Apps	(Gls)
2012–2013	Persatu Tuban	6	(0)
2013–2014	Persijap Jepara	12	(1)
2014	→ PSIS Semarang (loan)	14	(5)
2015–2016	Arema Cronus	7	(0)
2017–2022	Persikabo 1973	70	(6)
2022	→ Persik Kediri (loan)	6	(0)
2022–2023	Persebaya Surabaya	29	(3)
2023–2025	Dewa United	45	(4)
2025–2026	Madura United	15	(1)
2026–	PSIS Semarang	1	(0)

International career
2015	Indonesia U23	13	(3)
- * Club domestic league appearances and goals as of 9 October 2026

Ahmad Nufiandani (born 20 November 1994) is an Indonesian professional footballer who plays as a winger for Championship club PSIS Semarang. He is also a second sergeant in the Indonesian Army.

== Club career ==
He played until 2014 for Persijap Jepara. On 30 November 2014, he signed with Arema Cronus.

== Career statistics ==
=== Club ===
As of 9 October 2026

Club statistics
Club	Season	League		Piala Indonesia		Asian		Total	
Club	Season	Apps	Goals	Apps	Goals	Apps	Goals	Apps	Goals
Persijap Jepara	2014	12	1	—				12	1
PSIS Semarang (loan)	2014	14	5	—				14	5
Arema Cronus	2015	2	0	—				2	0
Arema Cronus	2016	5	0	—				5	0
Arema Cronus	Total	7	0	—				7	0
PS TNI	2017	30	1	—				30	1
PS TIRA	2018	29	5	2	2	—		31	7
TIRA–Persikabo	2019	0	0	0	0	—		0	0
TIRA–Persikabo	2020	1	0	—				1	0
Persikabo 1973	2021–22	10	0	—				10	0
Persikabo 1973	Total	70	6	2	2	—		72	8
Persik Kediri (loan)	2021–22	6	0	—				6	0
Persebaya Surabaya	2022–23	29	3	—				29	3
Dewa United	2023–24	22	4	—				22	4
Dewa United	2024–25	23	0	—				23	0
Dewa United	Total	45	4	—				45	4
Madura United	2025–26	15	1	—				15	1
PSIS Semarang	2026–27	1	0	—				1	0
Career total		199	20	2	2	0	0	201	22

== International goals ==
Scores and results list the Indonesia's goal tally first.

Indonesia U-23

#	Date	Venue	Opponent	Score	Result	Competition
1.	29 March 2015	Gelora Bung Karno Stadium, Jakarta, Indonesia	Brunei U-23	1–0	2–0	2016 AFC U-23 Championship qualification
2.	2 June 2015	Jalan Besar Stadium, Kallang, Singapore	Myanmar U-23	2–4	2–4	2015 SEA Games
3.	6 June 2015	Jalan Besar Stadium, Kallang, Singapore	Cambodia U-23	2–0	6–1	2015 SEA Games

== Honours ==
=== Clubs ===
Arema

- Indonesian Inter Island Cup: 2014/15
