= Yandi Sofyan =

Indonesian footballer

- Yandi with Persija in 2025

Personal information
- Full name: Yandi Sofyan Munawar
- Date of birth: 25 May 1992 (age 34)
- Place of birth: Garut, Indonesia
- Height: 1.76 m (5 ft 9 in)
- Position: Forward

Team information
- Current team: PSGC Ciamis
- Number: 9

Youth career
- 2001–2006: Persigar Garut
- 2006–2007: Persib Bandung
- 2008–2011: Deportivo Indonesia
- 2013–2014: Arema U21

Senior career*
Years	Team	Apps	(Gls)
2011–2013	Visé	21	(0)
2013–2014	Arema Cronus	0	(0)
2014	→ Brisbane Roar Youth (loan)	13	(2)
2015–2016	Persib Bandung	1	(0)
2017–2018	Bali United	21	(1)
2021	Persikota Tangerang	5	(1)
2022–2024	Persikabo 1973	58	(12)
2024–2025	Malut United	5	(0)
2025	→ Persija Jakarta	8	(0)
2025–2026	Persik Kediri	13	(0)
2026–	PSGC Ciamis	0	(0)

International career
2008–2009	Indonesia U16		
2009–2010	Indonesia U19	5	(0)
2013–2015	Indonesia U23	13	(3)
Medal record
Men's football
Representing Indonesia
Southeast Asian Games
Silver medal – second place	2013 Naypyidaw	Team
- * Club domestic league appearances and goals as of 23:51, 23 May 2026 (UTC)

Yandi Sofyan Munawar (born 25 May 1992) is an Indonesian professional footballer who plays as a forward for Championship club PSGC Ciamis.

== Club career ==
He used to be a part of the Brisbane Roar Youth team in the National Premier Leagues Queensland, on loan from Arema Cronus. During the loan period he played in 13 matches and scored two goals.

In December 2014, he was signed with Persib Bandung. Yandi Munawar made his professional debut on February 25, 2015, coming on as a substitute in Persib's 4–1 win over New Radiant in the 2015 AFC Cup and scoring one goal.

On 22 June 2025, Yandi officially signed Persik Kediri.

== International career ==
In 2013, Yandi Munawar represented the Indonesia U-23, in the 2013 Southeast Asian Games.

== Career statistics ==
=== Club ===
As of 23 May 2026.

Club statistics
Club	Season	League			National Cup (Note: Includes Piala Indonesia)		Continental (Note: Appearances in AFC Cup)		Other (Note: Appearances in Indonesia President's Cup)		Total	
Club	Season	Division	Apps	Goals	Apps	Goals	Apps	Goals	Apps	Goals	Apps	Goals
Visé	2011–12	Belgian Second Division	15	0	0	0	—		—		15	0
Visé	2012–13	Belgian Second Division	6	0	0	0	—		—		6	0
Visé	Total		21	0	0	0	—		—		21	0
Arema Cronus	2013	Indonesia Super League	0	0	—		—		—		0	0
Arema Cronus	2014	Indonesia Super League	0	0	—		—		—		0	0
Arema Cronus	Total		0	0	—		—		—		0	0
Persib Bandung	2015	Indonesia Super League	0	0	0	0	4	1	3	0	7	1
Persib Bandung	2016	ISC A	1	0	0	0	0	0	—		1	0
Persib Bandung	Total		1	0	0	0	4	1	—		5	1
Bali United	2017	Liga 1	11	0	0	0	0	0	—		11	0
Bali United	2018	Liga 1	10	1	1	1	3	0	—		14	2
Bali United	Total		21	1	1	1	3	0	—		25	2
Persikota Tangerang	2021	Liga 3	5	1	0	0	—		—		5	1
Persikabo 1973	2022–23	Liga 1	26	3	0	0	—		2	0	28	3
Persikabo 1973	2023–24	Liga 1	32	9	0	0	—		0	0	32	9
Persikabo 1973	Total		58	12	0	0	—		2	0	60	12
Malut United	2024–25	Liga 1	5	0	0	0	—		0	0	5	0
Persija Jakarta	2024–25	Liga 1	8	0	0	0	—		0	0	8	0
Persik Kediri	2025–26	Super League	13	0	0	0	—		0	0	13	0
Career total			132	14	1	1	7	1	5	0	145	16

=== International ===
==== International goals ====
International under-23 goals

Goal	Date	Venue	Opponent	Score	Result	Competition
1	22 November 2013	Gelora Bung Karno Stadium, Jakarta, Indonesia	Papua New Guinea U-23	2–0	6–0	2013 MNC Cup
2	22 November 2013	Gelora Bung Karno Stadium, Jakarta, Indonesia	Papua New Guinea U-23	4–0	6–0	2013 MNC Cup
3	9 December 2013	Thuwunna Stadium, Yangon, Myanmar	Cambodia U-23	1–0	1–0	2013 Southeast Asian Games

== Personal life ==
Born in Garut Regency, West Java, Yandi is the younger brother of former Persib Bandung and Indonesia national team player Zaenal Arif.

Yandi married Indonesia women's national volleyball team player Pungky Afriecia on 22 July 2018. She played in the 2018 Asian Games volleyball tournament, finishing seventh.

== Honours ==
Persib Bandung

- Indonesia President's Cup: 2015

Indonesia U-23

- SEA Games silver medal: 2013
