= Ricky Kayame =

Indonesian footballer

Personal information
- Full name: Ricky Kayame
- Date of birth: 21 September 1994 (age 32)
- Place of birth: Nabire, Indonesia
- Height: 1.62 m (5 ft 4 in)
- Position: Forward

Team information
- Current team: Persipani Paniai
- Number: 12

Youth career
- Koteka Putra

Senior career*
Years	Team	Apps	(Gls)
2013–2017	Persipura Jayapura	46	(8)
2016–2017	→ Persib Bandung (loan)	7	(2)
2017–2019	Persebaya Surabaya	28	(4)
2019–2020	Arema	33	(5)
2020–2021	Persita Tangerang	3	(0)
2021–2022	Persipura Jayapura	10	(2)
2022–2023	Persewar Waropen	0	(0)
2023–2024	Persipura Jayapura	6	(0)
2024–	Persipani Paniai	13	(4)

International career
2013	Indonesia U23	3	(1)
- * Club domestic league appearances and goals as of 3 February 2024

Ricky Kayame (born 21 September 1994) is an Indonesian professional footballer who plays as a forward for Liga Nusantara club Persipani Paniai.

== Club career ==
=== Persipura Jayapura ===
In October 2012, he signed a contract with Persipura Jayapura after being selected in a selection performed by the club to scout local talents. He made his debut on 3 July 2013 against Persidafon Dafonsoro and managed to score two goals in an 8–1 win. On 22 May 2014, he scored his third goal in a 2–0 win against Persiba Bantul.

== Honours ==
=== Club ===
Persipura Jayapura

- Indonesia Super League: 2013
- Indonesia Soccer Championship A: 2016

Persebaya Surabaya

- Liga 2: 2017

Arema

- Indonesia President's Cup: 2019

=== Individual ===
- Indonesia President's Cup Top Goalscorer: 2019 (shared)
