= Florent Zitte =

French footballer (born 1993)

Personal information
- Full name: Florent Zitte
- Date of birth: 17 May 1993 (age 33)
- Place of birth: Saint-Denis, France
- Height: 1.83 m (6 ft 0 in)
- Position: Striker

Youth career
- –2013: Nancy

Senior career*
Years	Team	Apps	(Gls)
2011–2015	Nancy B	67	(7)
2012–2015	Nancy	22	(1)
2015–2017	Union SG	29	(4)
2017–2018	JS Saint-Pierroise		
2018–2019	Luzenac AP	10	(3)
2019	Semen Padang	0	(0)
- * Club domestic league appearances and goals as of 14:59, 6 June 2018 (UTC)

Florent Zitte (born 17 May 1993) is a French former footballer who played as a striker. His last club was Semen Padang in the 2019 season.

== Career ==
Zitte was born in Saint-Denis, Réunion. He made his Ligue 1 debut for AS Nancy in the 2012–13 season. In 2013, the club was relegated to Ligue 2.

In February 2019, Zitte joined the Indonesian club Semen Padang. He played two games for the club in the Indonesia President's Cup and scored in both. However, it was announced on 4 March 2019 that he had left the club.
