= Heru Setyawan =

Indonesian footballer

Personal information
- Full name: Heru Setyawan
- Date of birth: 10 March 1993 (age 33)
- Place of birth: Semarang, Indonesia
- Height: 1.80 m (5 ft 11 in)
- Position: Midfielder

Team information
- Current team: Persebi Boyolali
- Number: 31

Youth career
- 2014–2015: Persita Tangerang

Senior career*
Years	Team	Apps	(Gls)
2015–2016	Kalteng Putra	0	(0)
2016–2017	Persita Tangerang	33	(4)
2018	Persis Solo	12	(0)
2018	Persita Tangerang	9	(0)
2019	PSIS Semarang	13	(1)
2020–2021	Persela Lamongan	2	(0)
2021	PSIM Yogyakarta	2	(0)
2022	Kalteng Putra	3	(0)
2023–2024	PSKC Cimahi	16	(0)
2025–	Persebi Boyolali	11	(1)
- * Club domestic league appearances and goals as of 3 May 2025

Heru Setyawan (born 10 March 1993) is an Indonesian professional footballer who plays as a midfielder for Liga 4 club Persebi Boyolali.

== Club career ==
=== PSIS Semarang ===
In 2019, Heru Setyawan signed a contract with Indonesian Liga 1 club PSIS Semarang. He made his debut on 6 July 2019 in a match against Persela Lamongan. On 11 September 2019, Heru scored his first goal for PSIS against PSM Makassar in the 63rd minute at the Andi Mattalatta Stadium, Makassar.

=== Persela Lamongan ===
He was signed for Persela Lamongan to play in Liga 1 in the 2020 season. Heru made his league debut on 1 March 2020 in a match against Persib Bandung at the Si Jalak Harupat Stadium, Soreang. This season was suspended on 27 March 2020 due to the COVID-19 pandemic. The season was abandoned and was declared void on 20 January 2021.

=== PSIM Yogyakarta ===
In 2021, Heru Setyawan signed a contract with Indonesian Liga 2 club PSIM Yogyakarta. He made his league debut on 12 October in a 0–0 draw against Persis Solo at the Manahan Stadium, Surakarta.

== Honours ==
Persebi Boyolali

- Liga 4 Central Java: 2024–25
