= Victor Juffo =

Brazilian footballer

Personal information
- Full name: Nildo Victor Juffo
- Date of birth: 24 January 1993 (age 33)
- Place of birth: Guaçuí, Brazil
- Height: 1.76 m (5 ft 9 in)
- Position: Midfielder

Team information
- Current team: Bylis

Youth career
- Rio Branco-ES
- 2012: → São Paulo (loan)
- Bahia

Senior career*
Years	Team	Apps	(Gls)
2015–2017	Shkëndija	36	(11)
2017–2018	Flamurtari	23	(3)
2018	Vardar	14	(1)
2019	Semen Padang	0	(0)
2020	Vitória-ES	1	(0)
2021	Koper	1	(0)
2021–2022	Pelister	15	(3)
2022	Afogados	13	(1)
2022	Jaguaré		
2023	Coruripe	4	(0)
2023	Jequié		
2023–2024	Anapolina		
2024–	Bylis	12	(0)
- * Club domestic league appearances and goals as of 4 May 2024

Nildo Victor Juffo (born 24 February 1993) is a Brazilian footballer who plays as a midfielder for Albanian club Bylis.

== Career ==
In 2012, Juffo was sent on loan to the youth academy of São Paulo, one of Brazil's most successful clubs.

Before the second half of 2014/15, he signed for Shkëndija in North Macedonia, where he suffered a ligament injury.

In 2017, Juffo signed for Albanian club Flamurtari, where he claimed the football was defensive, and did not receive his salary for 6 months, and made 26 appearances and scored 4 goals.

In 2018, Juffo signed for Vardar, the most successful team in Macedonia.

Before the 2019 season, he signed for Indonesian outfit Semen Padang, where he suffered an injury.

Before the 2020 season, Juffo signed for Vitória-ES in the Brazilian fourth division.

Before the second half of 2020–21, he signed for Slovenian side Koper.
