= Hendro Siswanto =

Indonesian footballer

Personal information
- Full name: Hendro Siswanto
- Date of birth: 12 March 1990 (age 36)
- Place of birth: Tuban, Indonesia
- Height: 1.72 m (5 ft 8 in)
- Position: Defensive midfielder

Team information
- Current team: Persela Lamongan
- Number: 12

Youth career
- 2006–2007: SSB Tuban

Senior career*
Years	Team	Apps	(Gls)
2007–2008	Persida Sidoarjo		
2008–2009	PSIS Semarang	11	(0)
2009–2010	Persiba Balikpapan	28	(4)
2010–2011	Persela Lamongan	19	(1)
2011–2021	Arema	164	(3)
2021–2025	Borneo Samarinda	101	(1)
2025–	Persela Lamongan	33	(1)

International career
2007	Indonesia U19	3	(1)
2008	Indonesia U21	0	(0)
2009–2013	Indonesia U23	13	(0)
2013–2019	Indonesia	6	(0)
Medal record
Men's football
Representing Indonesia
Southeast Asian Games
Silver medal – second place	2011 Jakarta-Palembang	Team
- * Club domestic league appearances and goals as of 8 November 2026

Hendro Siswanto (born 12 March 1990) is an Indonesian professional footballer who plays as a defensive midfielder for Championship club Persela Lamongan.

== International career ==
He made his debut with Indonesia on 7 June 2013 in a friendly against Netherlands as a substitute.

== Career statistics ==
=== International ===
As of 19 November 2019

Indonesia national team
Year	Apps	Goals
2013	1	0
2014	4	0
2019	1	0
Total	6	0

=== International goals ===
Scores and results list Indonesia's goal tally first.

No	Date	Venue	Opponent	Score	Result	Competition
1.	25 June 2014	Gajayana Stadium, Malang, Indonesia	Nepal	2–0	2–0	Unofficial Friendly

== Honours ==
Arema

- East Java Governor Cup: 2013
- Menpora Cup: 2013
- Indonesian Inter Island Cup: 2014/15
- Piala Presiden: 2017, 2019

Borneo Samarinda

- Piala Presiden runner-up: 2022, 2024

Indonesia U-23

- SEA Games silver medal: 2011
