= Sengbah Kennedy =

Liberian footballer

Personal information
- Full name: Sengbah Kennedy
- Date of birth: 8 April 1991 (age 35)
- Position: Midfielder

Youth career
- 2005–2006: Marcet Soccer Academy
- 2006–2007: Karketu Dili

Senior career*
Years	Team	Apps	(Gls)
2007–2010	Monrovia Black Star FC	58	(11)
2010–2012	LISCR FC	74	(8)
2012–2013	Sime Darby FC	50	(4)
2013–2014	LISCR FC	19	(1)
2014–2015	Persiwa Wamena	19	(9)
2015–2016	Arema	21	(1)
2016	Persipura Jayapura	19	(3)

International career
2014	Liberia	1	(0)
- * Club domestic league appearances and goals as of 00:22, 8 April 2015 (UTC)

Sengbah Kennedy (born 8 April 1991) is a Liberian former footballer who played as a midfielder.

== Honors ==
=== Clubs ===
Arema

- Indonesian Inter Island Cup: 2014/15

Persiwa Wamena

- Liga Indonesia Premier Division runner-up: 2014

Sime Darby

- FA Cup Malaysia runners-up: 2012

=== Individual ===
- Liga Indonesia Premier Division Best Players: 2014
