= Maycon Calijuri =

Brazilian footballer

Personal information
- Full name: Maycon Rogerio Silva Calijuri
- Date of birth: 6 June 1986 (age 40)
- Place of birth: Jaboticabal, Brazil
- Height: 1.79 m (5 ft 10 in)
- Position: Forward

Youth career
- 1999–2000: América-SP
- 2001: Esporte Clube Vitória
- 2002–2005: Santos
- 2005: Fluminense

Senior career*
Years	Team	Apps	(Gls)
2006	URT		
2007	Extrema FC		
2008–2009	Gomel	44	(18)
2010–2012	Jagiellonia Białystok	10	(0)
2010–2011	→ Piast Gliwice (loan)	25	(6)
2012	→ BATE Borisov (loan)	2	(0)
2013	Masafi Sports Club	13	(6)
2014	Inter de Limeira	5	(0)
2015	Persib Bandung	1	(0)
2015–2016	Chiangmai	6	(1)
2011	Lampang	8	(1)
2016	Persiba Balikpapan	9	(3)
2017–2018	Boeung Ket	33	(38)
2019	Shan United F.C.	11	(9)
2019	UiTM	7	(2)
- * Club domestic league appearances and goals

Maycon Rogério Silva Calijuri (born 6 June 1986) is a Brazilian former professional footballer who played as a forward.

== Career ==
While playing for Gomel, Maycon became the top scorer during the 2009 Belarusian Premier League season with 15 goals. He moved to Jagiellonia Białystok on a four-year contract deal in January 2010. In the summer 2010, he was loaned to Piast Gliwice. He returned to Jagiellonia one year later. Maycon Calijuri was loaned to BATE Borisov prior to the start of the 2012 Belarusian Premier League season. He made just two league appearances for the club, and was not registered for the group stages of the Champions League, before the loan expired.

== Honours ==
Jagiellonia Białystok

- Polish Cup: 2009–10

BATE Borisov

- Belarusian Premier League: 2012

Boeung Ket

- Cambodian League: 2017

Individual

- Belarusian Premier League top scorer: 2009
