= 2014 Indonesian Inter Island Cup =

2014 Inter Island Cup
Tournament details
- Host country: Indonesia
- Dates: 18 January 2014 – 1 February 2015
- Teams: 8 (final); 22 (qualifying)
- Venue(s): 2 (in 2 host cities)

Final positions
- Champions: Arema Cronous (1st title)
- Runners-up: Persib Bandung

Tournament statistics
- Matches played: 12
- Goals scored: 38 (3.17 per match)
- Attendance: 74,550 (6,213 per match)
- Top scorer(s): (Ivory Coast) Lancine Koné (Nigeria) Osas Saha (7 goals)

The 2014 Inter Island Cup was the final edition of the Indonesian Inter Island Cup, the football pre-season tournament of Indonesia. The date of the tournament was from 18 January 2014 to 1 February 2015. The final round was postponed to an unknown time because the police didn't give permission, concerning the vicious rivalries between the club's supporters.

== Venues ==
The venues for the 2014 Inter Island Cup were in Manahan Stadium, Surakarta and Kanjuruhan Stadium, Malang Regency. Gelora Sriwijaya Stadium, Palembang was the venue for the final.

| Surakarta, JT | Malang, JI | Palembang, SS |
|---|---|---|
| Manahan Stadium | Kanjuruhan Stadium | Gelora Sriwijaya Stadium |
| 7°33′20″S 110°48′23″E | 8.149333°S 112.573975°E | 3°01′17″S 104°47′21″E |
| Capacity: 35,000 | Capacity: 40,000 | Capacity: 36,000 |
2014 Indonesian Inter Island Cup is located in Indonesia

== Qualification ==
Qualification took place from 10 to 16 January 2014. It involved the 22 Indonesia Super League teams. The tournament was divided into four zones. All zones were played in a round-robin tournament format except for the Sumatra zone.

The Kalimantan and Sulawesi-Papua zones were divided into two group each filled with four teams, with the top two teams in each zone qualifying for the tournament proper. For the Sumatra zone followed by Sriwijaya and Semen Padang, they played home-and-away system, with the winner qualifying for the tournament proper. For the Java zone, the 12 participating clubs were divided into three groups of four with the round robin system, and the winner from each group entered the tournament proper.

=== Qualified teams ===
Location of teams of the 2014 Inter Island Cup

| Team | Island | Qualified as | Appearance | Last Appearance |
|---|---|---|---|---|
| Persib Bandung | Java | Winner of Java Zone Group 1 | 3rd | 2012 |
| Arema Cronous | Java | Winner of Java Zone Group 2 | 3rd | 2012 |
| Persik Kediri | Java | Winner of Java Zone Group 3 | 1st | none |
| Barito Putera | Kalimantan | Winner of Kalimantan Zone | 2nd | 2012 |
| Mitra Kukar | Kalimantan | Runner-up of Kalimantan Zone | 2nd | 2012 |
| Sriwijaya | Sumatra | Winner of Sumatra Zone | 3rd | 2012 |
| Persiram Raja Ampat | Sulawesi-Papua | Winner of Sulawesi-Papua Zone | 1st | none |
| Perseru Serui | Sulawesi-Papua | Runner-up of Sulawesi-Papua Zone | 1st | none |

== Draw ==
The draw for the final tournament as well as the qualification tournament took place on 30 December 2013.

== Squads ==
Each team named a minimum of 18 players in their squads (three of whom were goalkeepers) by the deadline that Liga Indonesia determined was on 7 January 2014. Injury replacements were allowed until 24 hours before the team's first match.

== Final tournament ==
Played from 18 to 22 January 2014.

=== Group stage ===
==== Tie-breaking criteria ====
Ranking in each group shall be determined as follows:

1. Greater number of points obtained in all group matches;
2. Result of the direct match between the teams in question;
3. Goal difference in all group matches;
4. Greater number of goals scored in all group matches.

If two or more teams are equal on the basis on the above four criteria, the place shall be determined as follows:

1. Kicks from the penalty mark if the teams in question are still on the field of play;
2. Drawing of lots by the Organising Committee.

==== Group A ====
- All matches were played in Malang Regency on 18 – 21 January 2014.
- Times listed are UTC+7.

| Pos | Team | Pld | W | D | L | GF | GA | GD | Pts | Qualification |
|---|---|---|---|---|---|---|---|---|---|---|
| 1 | Arema Cronous | 3 | 2 | 1 | 0 | 4 | 2 | +2 | 7 | Final |
| 2 | Barito Putera | 3 | 1 | 2 | 0 | 6 | 3 | +3 | 5 | |
| 3 | Sriwijaya | 3 | 1 | 0 | 2 | 9 | 5 | +4 | 3 | |
| 4 | Perseru Serui | 3 | 0 | 1 | 2 | 0 | 9 | −9 | 1 | |

Source: Soccerway
18 January 2014
15:30

| Sriwijaya | 1 – 4 | Barito Putera |
|---|---|---|
| Koné 4' | Report | Syahroni 7'; Bangura 28'; Lomell 56'; Maïga 65' (o.g.) |

Kanjuruhan, Malang
Attendance: 1,426
Referee: Muslimin
18 January 2014
19:00

| Arema Cronous | 1 – 0 | Perseru Serui |
|---|---|---|
| Gustavo López 56' (pen.) | Report |

Kanjuruhan, Malang
Attendance: 8,109
Referee: Oki Dwi Putra

19 January 2014
15:30

| Barito Putera | 2 – 2 | Arema Cronous |
|---|---|---|
| Bangura 31'; Syahroni 78' | Report | Gonzáles 23'; Irsyad 25' |

Kanjuruhan, Malang
Attendance: 25,732
Referee: Jerry Elly
19 January 2014
19:00

| Perseru Serui | 0 – 8 | Sriwijaya |
|---|---|---|
| | Report | Koné 2', 22', 37', 48' (pen.), 73'; Nabar 68', 76'; Diogo Santos 90' |

Kanjuruhan, Malang
Attendance: 213
Referee: Thoriq Alkatiri

21 January 2014
15:30

| Barito Putera | 0 – 0 | Perseru Serui |
|---|---|---|
| | Report |

Kanjuruhan, Malang
Attendance: 1,527
Referee: P Hadi
21 January 2014
19:00

| Sriwijaya | 0 – 1 | Arema Cronous |
|---|---|---|
| | Report | Gonzáles 45+1' |

Kanjuruhan, Malang
Attendance: 16,376
Referee: Muslimin

==== Group B ====
- All matches were played in Surakarta on 19 – 22 January 2014.
- Times listed are UTC+7.

| Pos | Team | Pld | W | D | L | GF | GA | GD | Pts | Qualification |
|---|---|---|---|---|---|---|---|---|---|---|
| 1 | Persib Bandung | 3 | 1 | 2 | 0 | 4 | 3 | +1 | 5 (Note: Tiebreakers: Persib is ranked ahead of Persiram based on their greater number of goals scored in all group matches.) | Final |
| 2 | Persiram Raja Ampat | 3 | 1 | 2 | 0 | 2 | 1 | +1 | 5 | |
| 3 | Mitra Kukar | 3 | 1 | 1 | 1 | 8 | 4 | +4 | 4 | |
| 4 | Persik Kediri | 3 | 0 | 1 | 2 | 5 | 11 | −6 | 1 | |

Source: Soccerway
Notes:
19 January 2014
15:30

| Persib Bandung | 0 – 0 | Persiram Raja Ampat |
|---|---|---|
| | Report |

Manahan, Surakarta
Attendance: 5,125
Referee: Handri Kristanto
19 January 2014
19:00

| Persik Kediri | 2 – 7 | Mitra Kukar |
|---|---|---|
| Firasat 5'; Irawan 67' | Report | Maitimo 7', 51', 62'; Zulham Zamrun 17', 39', 82'; Anindito 35' |

Manahan, Surakarta
Attendance: 115
Referee: Novari Ikhsan Arilaha

20 January 2014
15:30

| Persiram Raja Ampat | 1 – 1 | Persik Kediri |
|---|---|---|
| Osas Saha 80' | Report | Gumilang 89' |

Manahan, Surakarta
Attendance: 135
Referee: Suyanto
20 January 2014
19:00

| Mitra Kukar | 1 – 1 | Persib Bandung |
|---|---|---|
| Weeks 85' | Report | Fortune 76' |

Manahan, Surakarta
Attendance: 4,113
Referee: Iwan Sukoco

22 January 2014
15:30

| Persiram Raja Ampat | 1 – 0 | Mitra Kukar |
|---|---|---|
| Ronald 90' | Report |

Manahan, Surakarta
Attendance: 2,135
Referee: N Fadillah
22 January 2014
19:00

| Persib Bandung | 3 – 2 | Persik Kediri |
|---|---|---|
| Konaté 42' (pen.); Sinaga 53'; Ridwan 86' | Report | Gumilang 25'; Aditama 29' |

Manahan, Surakarta
Attendance: 2,015
Referee: Suyanto

=== Final ===
Final match was played in Palembang on 1 February 2015.

1 February 2015
18:45 UTC+7:00

| Arema Cronous | 2 – 1 (a.e.t.) | Persib Bandung |
|---|---|---|
| Fabiano 51' (pen.); Kennedy 116' | Report | Vujović 76' |

Gelora Sriwijaya Stadium, Palembang
Attendance: 7,529
Referee: Muslimin

== Broadcasters ==
2014 Indonesian Inter Island Cup Broadcasters
| Country | Broadcast network | Television station |
|---|---|---|
| Indonesia | Emtek | Indosiar |

== Goalscorers ==
=== Top Scorers ===
| Rank | Player | Team | Goals | |
| Rank | Player | Team | FG | TG |
|---|---|---|---|---|
| 1 | (Ivory Coast) Lancine Koné | Sriwijaya | 6 | 7 |
| 2 | (Indonesia) Zulham Zamrun | Mitra Kukar | 3 | 5 |
| 3 | (Indonesia) Raphael Maitimo | Mitra Kukar | 3 | 3 |
| 4 | (Sierra Leone) Shaka Bangura | Barito Putera | 2 | 4 |
| 5 | (Indonesia) Johanes Nabar | Sriwijaya | 2 | 3 |
| 5 | (Indonesia) Cristian Gonzáles | Arema Cronous | 2 | 3 |
| 7 | (Indonesia) Syahroni | Barito Putera | 2 | 2 |
| 7 | (Indonesia) Dimas Galih Gumilang | Persik Kediri | 2 | 2 |
| 9 | (Nigeria) Osas Saha | Persiram Raja Ampat | 1 | 7 |
| 10 | (Argentina) Gustavo López | Arema Cronous | 1 | 2 |
| 10 | (Indonesia) Irsyad Maulana | Arema Cronous | 1 | 2 |
| 10 | (Indonesia) Dicky Firasat | Persik Kediri | 1 | 2 |
| 10 | (Indonesia) Rendy Irawan | Persik Kediri | 1 | 2 |
| 10 | (Indonesia) Faris Aditama | Persik Kediri | 1 | 2 |
| 10 | (Mali) Makan Konaté | Persib Bandung | 1 | 2 |
| 10 | (Indonesia) Ferdinand Sinaga | Persib Bandung | 1 | 2 |
| 10 | (Indonesia) Muhammad Ridwan | Persib Bandung | 1 | 2 |

Notes

1. Finals Goals (FG) : Goals scored in the final tournament only.
2. Tournament Goals (TG) : Including goals scored in the qualification stage.

=== Own Goals ===
| Player | For | Club |
|---|---|---|
| (Mali) Abdoulaye Maïga | Barito Putera | Sriwijaya |
