= 2015 Piala Indonesia =

Tournament details
- Country: Indonesia
- Teams: 24

The 2015 Piala Indonesia was originally to be the seventh edition of Piala Indonesia, the nationwide football cup tournament in Indonesia, involving professional clubs from Indonesian Premier League and Premier Division. Persibo Bojonegoro would have been the tournament's defending champions. The competition was cancelled on 2 May 2015 when Imam Nahrawi, the Minister of Youth and Sports Affairs, banned the Football Association of Indonesia from running any football competition.

The cup winner would have qualified for the 2016 AFC Cup.

== Groups ==
Tournament cancelled.
