= Ricky Ohorella =

Indonesian footballer

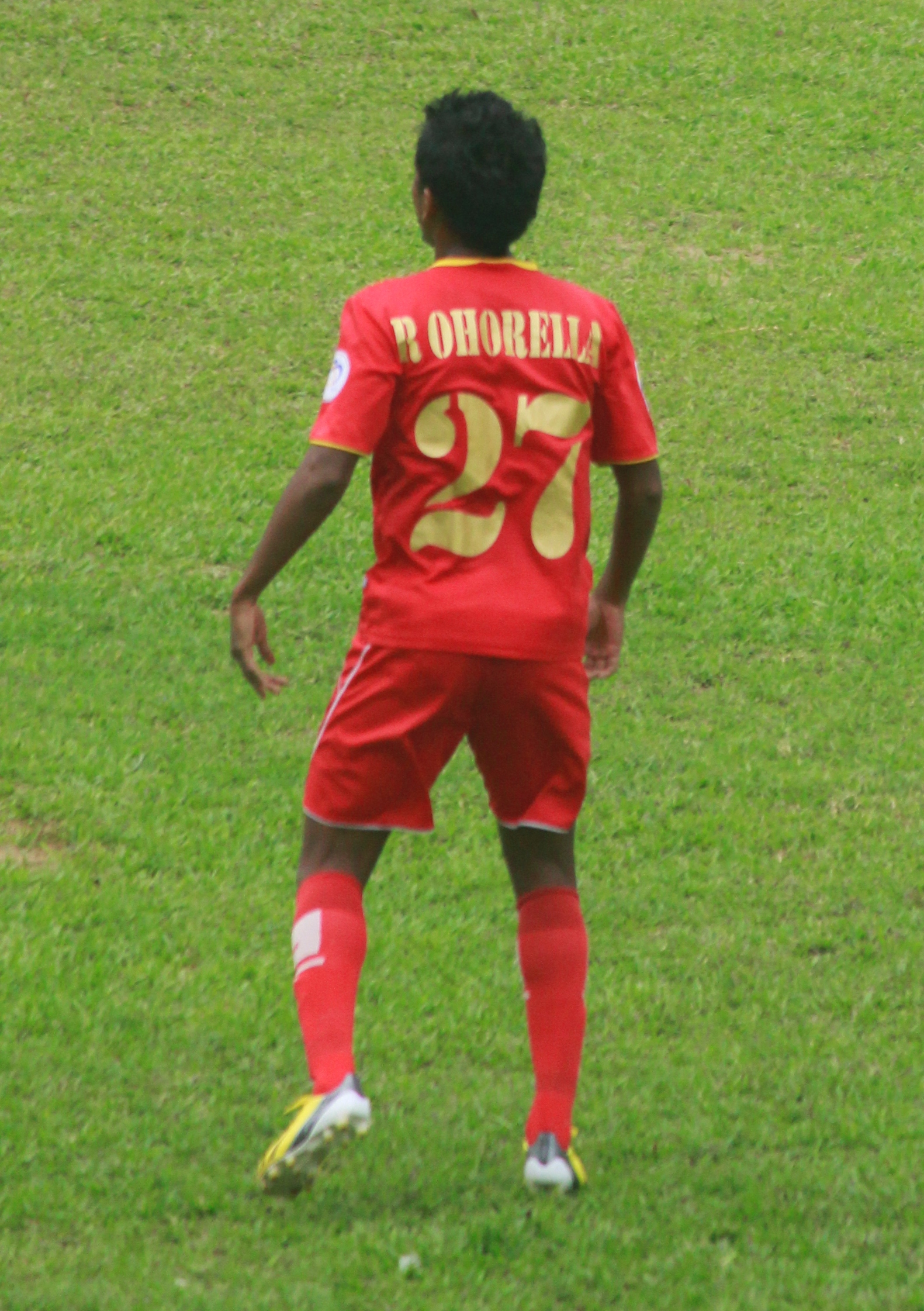
- Ohorella playing for Semen Padang in 2013

Personal information
- Full name: Ricky Akbar Ohorella
- Date of birth: 31 December 1990 (age 35)
- Place of birth: Tulehu, Indonesia
- Height: 1.67 m (5 ft 6 in)
- Position: Full-back

Youth career
- SSB Tulehu Maluku

Senior career*
Years	Team	Apps	(Gls)
2006–2007	Persikad Depok	12	(2)
2007–2009	Persibom	36	(2)
2009–2010	Persih Tembilahan	19	(1)
2011–2016	Semen Padang	35	(2)
2017	Borneo	12	(0)
2018–2019	Arema	24	(0)
2020–2021	Semen Padang	9	(0)
2022	Persela Lamongan	9	(0)
2022	PSIM Yogyakarta	6	(0)

International career
2005	Indonesia U17		
2007	Indonesia U19	4	(3)
2012	Indonesia	1	(0)
- * Club domestic league appearances and goals as of 27 September 2022

Ricky Akbar Ohorella (born 31 December 1990 in Indonesia) is an Indonesian professional footballer who plays as a full-back.

== International career ==
He made his debut for Indonesia in 2014 FIFA World Cup qualification against Bahrain on 29 February 2012.

== Honours ==
=== Club honours ===
Semen Padang

- Indonesia Premier League: 2011–12
- Indonesian Community Shield: 2013

Arema

- Indonesia President's Cup: 2019
