= Osas Saha =

Indonesian footballer (born 1986)

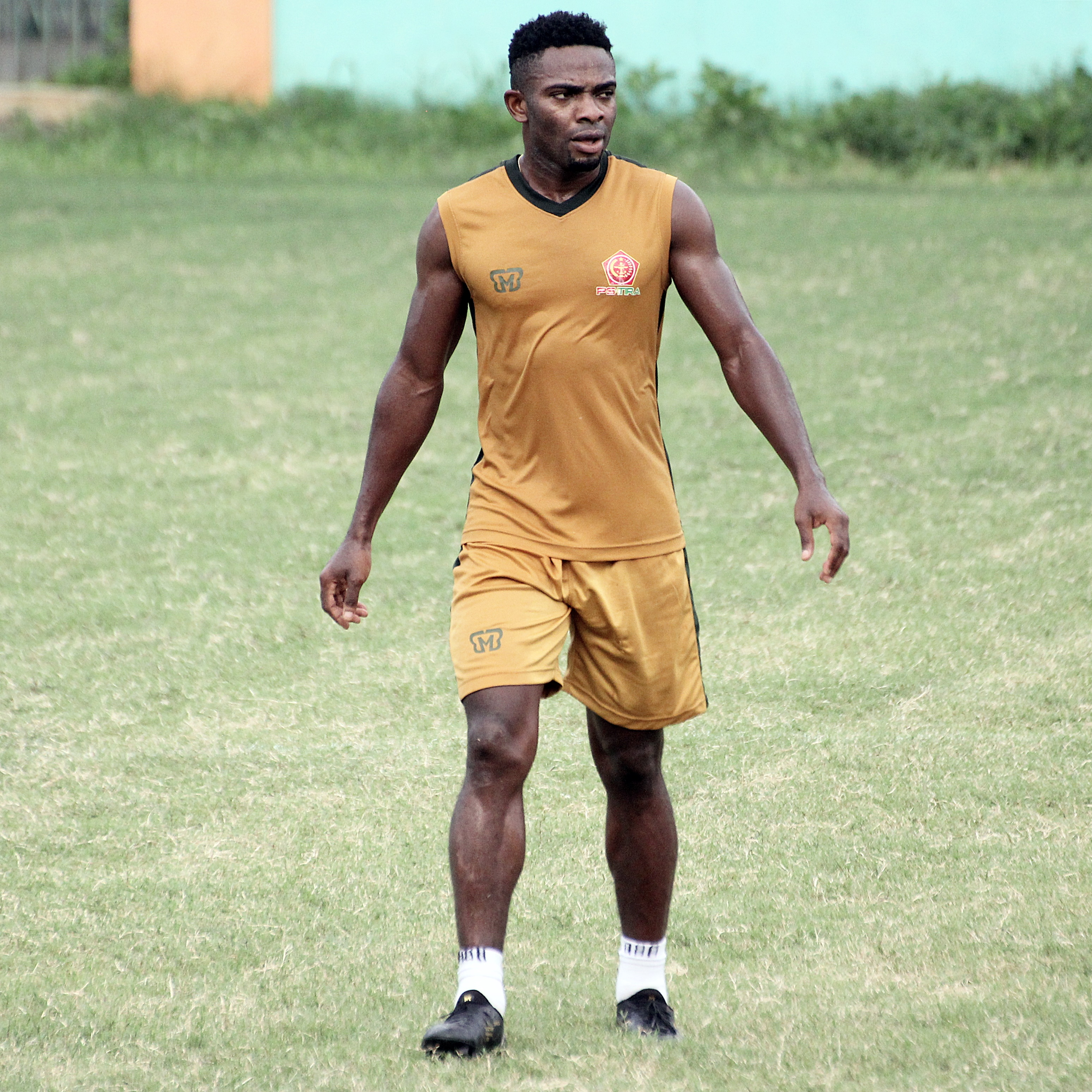
- Osas training with TIRA-Persikabo in 2019

Personal information
- Full name: Osas Marvelous Ikpefua
- Date of birth: 23 October 1986 (age 40)
- Place of birth: Lagos, Nigeria
- Height: 1.80 m (5 ft 11 in)
- Position: Forward

Senior career*
| Years | Team | Apps | (Gls) |
| 2003–2004 | Chykes Davies | 18 | (7) |
| 2004–2007 | Prime | 27 | (12) |
| 2007–2008 | PSDS Deli Serdang | 37 | (18) |
| 2008–2009 | KS Elbasani | 19 | (7) |
| 2009–2010 | PSMS Medan | 15 | (4) |
| 2010–2011 | PSAP Sigli | 26 | (29) |
| 2011–2012 | PSMS Medan | 32 | (19) |
| 2012–2013 | Persepam | 17 | (6) |
| 2013 | Persisam Putra | 14 | (10) |
| 2013–2014 | Persiram Raja Ampat | 6 | (1) |
| 2014 | Semen Padang | 15 | (8) |
| 2015–2016 | Perseru Serui | 18 | (10) |
| 2016 | Penang | 11 | (5) |
| 2018–2019 | Persija Jakarta | 13 | (2) |
| 2019–2020 | TIRA-Persikabo | 28 | (10) |
| 2020–2021 | PSM Makassar | 3 | (0) |
| 2021 | Bhayangkara | 1 | (0) |
| 2021 | PSG Pati | 3 | (1) |
| 2022–2023 | Persita Tangerang | 11 | (1) |
| 2023 | Kalteng Putra | 6 | (0) |
| 2023–2024 | PSBS Biak | 12 | (2) |
| 2024–2025 | Persibo Bojonegoro | 20 | (13) |
| 2026 | Persipura Jayapura | 5 | (0) |

International career
| 2019 | Indonesia | 2 | (0) |
- * Club domestic league appearances and goals as of 11 April 2026

Osas Marvelous Ikpefua (born 23 October 1986), better known as Osas Saha, is a footballer who plays as a forward. Born in Nigeria, he represented Indonesia at international level.

With his partner, Osas launched his venture, Global Sportainment Network, on 12 March 2022 in front of the South Jakarta Mayor in Indonesia and Foreign Ambassadors from Japan, Italy, Spain, Seychelles, Algeria, The United States and France. Although he has started his Sport business, he is still willing to continue his career as a professional footballer.

== Club career ==
=== Persija Jakarta ===
He was signed for Persija Jakarta to play in Liga 1 in 2018 season. Osas made his debut on 6 July 2018 in a match against PSM Makassar. On 6 July 2018, Osas scored his first goal in the 52nd minute at the Sultan Agung Stadium, Bantul.

=== TIRA-Persikabo ===
In 2019, Osas signed a year contract with TIRA-Persikabo. He made his league debut on 18 May 2019 in a match against Badak Lampung. On 29 June 2019, Osas scored his first goal for TIRA-Persikabo against Arema in the 26th minute at the Gajayana Stadium, Malang.

=== PSM Makassar ===
He was signed for PSM Makassar to play in Liga 1 in the 2020 season. Osas made his league debut on 1 March 2020 in a match against PSS Sleman. This season was suspended on 27 March 2020 due to the COVID-19 pandemic. The season was abandoned and was declared void on 20 January 2021.

=== Bhayangkara Solo ===
In 2021, Osas signed a contract with Indonesian Liga 1 club Bhayangkara Solo.

=== PSG Pati ===
In 2021, Osas signed a contract with Indonesian Liga 2 club PSG Pati. He made his league debut on 11 October against Persijap Jepara. On 25 October 2021, Osas scored his first goal for PSG Pati against Hizbul Wathan in the 61st minute at the Manahan Stadium, Surakarta.

=== Persita Tengerang ===
Osas was signed for Persita Tangerang to play in Liga 1 in the 2022–23 season. He made his league debut on 7 August 2022 in a match against Dewa United at the Indomilk Arena, Tangerang.

== International career ==
Saha was naturalized officially in August 2018 as he lived and played in Indonesia for more than ten years.

Saha made his debut for the Indonesia in the 2022 FIFA World Cup qualification against Thailand on 10 September 2019.

== Career statistics ==
=== Club ===
As of match played 11 April 2026

| Club | Season | League | | | Cup (Note: Includes Malaysia FA Cup) | | Continental (Note: Appearances in AFC Cup) | | Other (Note: Appearances in Indonesia President's Cup) | | Total | |
| Club | Season | Division | Apps | Goals | Apps | Goals | Apps | Goals | Apps | Goals | Apps | Goals |
|---|---|---|---|---|---|---|---|---|---|---|---|---|
| PSMS Medan | 2009–10 | Premier Division | 15 | 4 | 0 | 0 | 0 | 0 | 0 | 0 | 15 | 4 |
| PSAP Sigli | 2010–11 | Premier Division | 26 | 29 | 0 | 0 | 0 | 0 | 0 | 0 | 26 | 29 |
| PSMS Medan | 2011–12 | Indonesia Super League | 32 | 19 | 0 | 0 | 0 | 0 | 0 | 0 | 32 | 19 |
| Persepam Pamekasan | 2013 | Indonesia Super League | 17 | 6 | 0 | 0 | 0 | 0 | 0 | 0 | 17 | 6 |
| Putra Samarinda | 2013 | Indonesia Super League | 14 | 10 | 0 | 0 | 0 | 0 | 0 | 0 | 14 | 10 |
| Persiram Raja Ampat | 2014 | Indonesia Super League | 6 | 1 | 0 | 0 | 0 | 0 | 0 | 0 | 6 | 1 |
| Semen Padang | 2014 | Indonesia Super League | 15 | 8 | 0 | 0 | 0 | 0 | 0 | 0 | 15 | 8 |
| Perseru Serui | 2015 | Indonesia Super League | 2 | 2 | 0 | 0 | 0 | 0 | 0 | 0 | 2 | 2 |
| Penang | 2016 | Malaysia Super League | 11 | 5 | 1 | 0 | 0 | 0 | 0 | 0 | 11 | 5 |
| Persija Jakarta | 2018 | Liga 1 | 13 | 2 | 0 | 0 | 0 | 0 | 0 | 0 | 13 | 2 |
| TIRA-Persikabo | 2019 | Liga 1 | 28 | 10 | 0 | 0 | 0 | 0 | 3 | 4 | 31 | 14 |
| PSM Makassar | 2020 | Liga 1 | 3 | 0 | 0 | 0 | 5 | 1 | 0 | 0 | 8 | 1 |
| Bhayangkara | 2021 | Liga 1 | 0 | 0 | 0 | 0 | 0 | 0 | 1 (Note: Appearances in Menpora Cup) | 0 | 1 | 0 |
| PSG Pati | 2021 | Liga 2 | 3 | 1 | 0 | 0 | 0 | 0 | 0 | 0 | 3 | 1 |
| Persita Tangerang | 2022–23 | Liga 1 | 11 | 1 | 0 | 0 | – | | 0 | 0 | 11 | 1 |
| Kalteng Putra | 2023–24 | Liga 2 | 6 | 0 | 0 | 0 | – | | 0 | 0 | 6 | 0 |
| PSBS Biak | 2023–24 | Liga 2 | 12 | 2 | 0 | 0 | – | | 0 | 0 | 12 | 2 |
| Persibo Bojonegoro | 2024–25 | Liga 2 | 20 | 13 | 0 | 0 | – | | 0 | 0 | 20 | 13 |
| Persipura Jayapura | 2025–26 | Championship | 5 | 0 | 0 | 0 | – | | 0 | 0 | 5 | 0 |
| Career total | | | 240 | 113 | 1 | 0 | 5 | 1 | 4 | 4 | 252 | 118 |

=== International appearances ===
As of 19 November 2019

Appearances and goals by national team and year
| National team | Year | Apps | Goals |
|---|---|---|---|
| Indonesia | 2019 | 2 | 0 |
| Total | | 2 | 0 |

== Honours ==
Persija Jakarta

- Liga 1: 2018

PSBS Biak

- Liga 2: 2023–24

== See also ==
- List of Indonesia international footballers born outside Indonesia
