= Vladimir Vujović (footballer, born 1982) =

Montenegrin manager

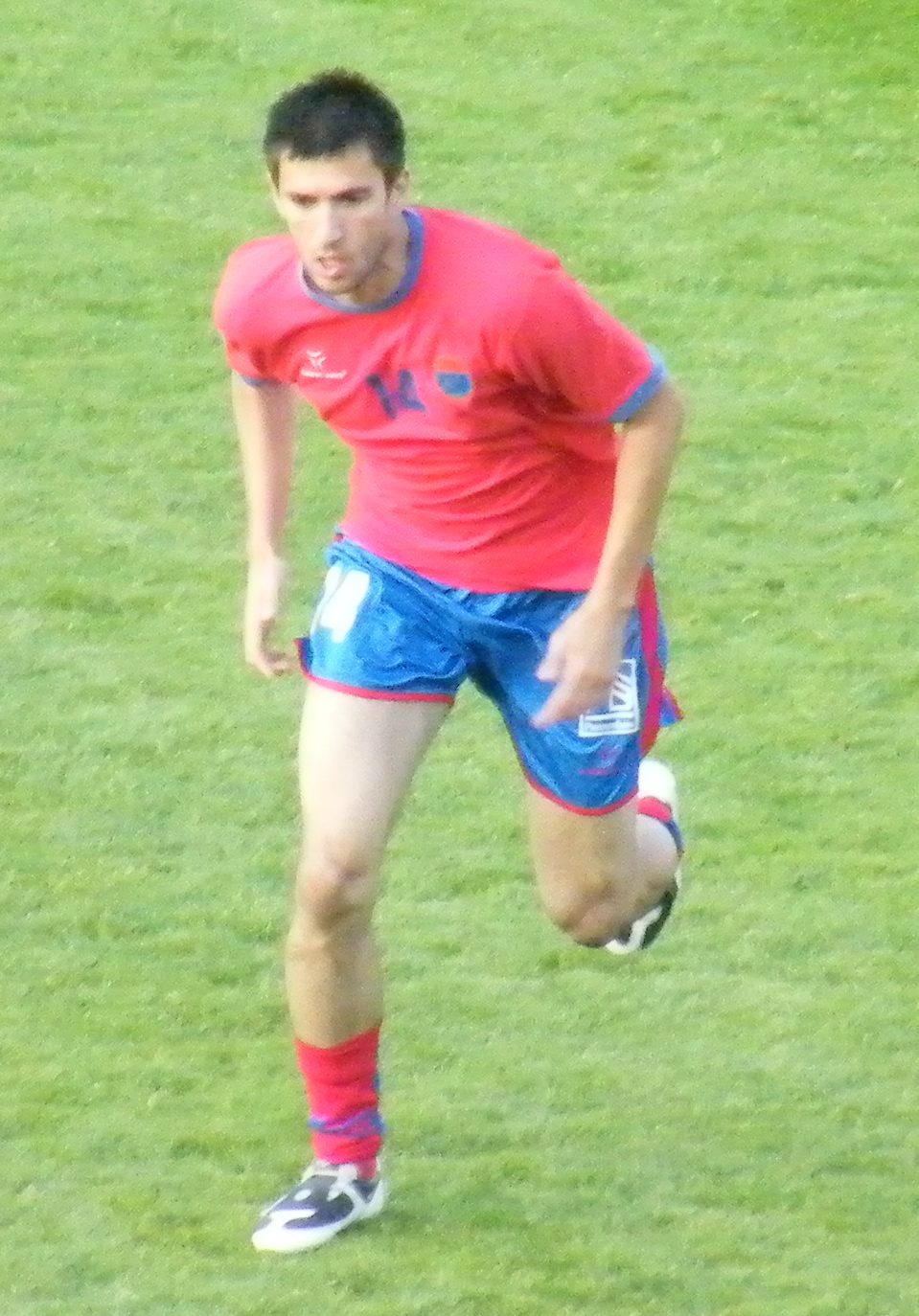
- Vujović 2009

Personal information
- Full name: Vladimir Vujović
- Date of birth: 23 July 1982 (age 44)
- Place of birth: Budva, SFR Yugoslavia
- Height: 1.90 m (6 ft 3 in)
- Position: Centre-back

Senior career*
Years	Team	Apps	(Gls)
1999–2001	Mogren	22	(3)
2001–2002	Beograd	39	(3)
2003	Petrovac	13	(2)
2003–2004	Sutjeska Nikšić	35	(3)
2005–2006	Pobeda	28	(7)
2006	Tavriya Simferopol	0	(0)
2006–2007	Al Wehda	28	(6)
2007	Mogren	12	(0)
2008	Luch Vladivostok	21	(0)
2009	Vasas	11	(1)
2009–2010	Mogren	14	(1)
2011	Vostok	13	(0)
2011–2012	Al Ahed	7	(0)
2012	Shenyang Shenbei	25	(2)
2013	Petrovac	11	(3)
2014–2017	Persib Bandung	61	(19)
2018	Bhayangkara	32	(2)
Total		438	(52)

International career
2007	Montenegro	3	(0)

Managerial career
- 2019: PSIM Yogyakarta
- 2021–2022: Salam Zgharta
- 2022–2023: Borneo Samarinda (technical director)
- 2023–2024: Racing Beirut
- 2025: Abdysh-Ata Khan
- 2025: BG Pathum United (assistant)
- 2025: BG Pathum United (interim)
- 2026: BG Pathum United
- * Club domestic league appearances and goals

Vladimir Vujović (Serbian Cyrillic: Владимир Вујовић, born 23 July 1982) is a Serbian and Montenegrin professional football coach and former player.

== Club career ==
=== Mogren ===
Vujović started playing in his home-town club FK Mogren. He made his debut as senior by making two appearances for Mogren in the 1999–2000 First League of FR Yugoslavia. Mogren ended the season 19th in the league and got relegated. That ended up opening way for Vujović to become a regular starter for Mogren in the following season when playing in the 2000–01 Second League of FR Yugoslavia (20 appearances). Mogren performed well and finished third, however it was not enough for promotion back to the national top-level.

=== Beograd ===
His regular exhibitions called the attention of the clubs from the capital, Belgrade, and that summer 2001 he moved to another club playing in the Second League, FK Beograd.

=== Petrovac ===
Vujović was a regular and after a year and a half he decided to leave the capital and return to Montenegro, this time signing with Second League side OFK Petrovac.

=== Sutjeska Nikšić ===
He was now closer to the eyes of the scouts of the strongest Montenegrin clubs playing in the First League, and half season at Petrovac was enough to earn him a move to FK Sutjeska Nikšić which had just ended the 2002–03 season of the FR Yugoslav First League at fourth place. It was summer 2003 and Vujović was now back to the First League of FR Yugoslavia but this time as more experienced player. Vujović was a regular starter in the squad of Sutjeska, however the club failed to repeat the great performance of the earlier season and finished eighth.

=== Pobeda ===
Sutjeska was performing even worse in 2004–05 and by the winter-break Vujović decided to move and signed with Macedonian side FK Pobeda. It ended being a right choice as Sutjeska ended the season in a relegation spot, while his new club, Pobeda, grabbed a European competition spot by finishing third in the 2004–05 Macedonian First League. Vujović contributed with 5 goals in the 14 games he played that half-season. By then Pobeda was a regular among the top Macedonian clubs, and next season they finished fourth.

=== Al Wehda ===
In summer 2006 he made his first move to Asia by signing with Saudi Arabian club Al-Wehda Mecca. Vujović scored 6 goals in 28 appearances helping the Mecca club to finish third in the 2006–07 Saudi Premier League. At that time Montenegro had become independent and formed its own national team. Vujović was among those who received the call up to the first Montenegro national team, and appeared in the beginning three matches for Montenegro.

=== Return to Mogren ===
In summer 2007 Vujović left Saudi Arabia and returned home. He joined FK Mogren and appeared with them in the second edition of the Montenegrin First League as national top-flight. His stay at home would be short when he left Mogren at the winter-break of the 2007–08 Montenegrin First League.

=== Luch Vladivostok ===
Back then Russia had its leagues taking place during calendar years, and at beginning of 2008 Vujović was target of FC Luch Vladivostok as their reinforcement for the 2008 Russian Premier League. The club from Vladivostok performed below expectations and ended the season relegated.

=== Vasas ===
It meant most of the best players were free to go, and so did Vujović, he left Russia and joined Hungarian side Vasas SC. He played with Vasas the second half of the 2008–09 Nemzeti Bajnokság I. Vasas finished 10th and failed to reach a European spot.

=== Second return to Mogren ===
Vujović left Budapest to return to FK Mogren. Following Mogren's third-place finish in the 2009–10 Montenegrin First League, Vujović played for several different clubs over the next few years.

=== Vostok ===
His experience in the Russian Premier League was a good recommendation for Kazakh side FC Vostok who were newly promoted in the 2011 Kazakhstan Premier League. However the team was not balanced enough to survive at Kazakh elite, and finished bottom and relegated.

=== Al Ahed ===
Vujović moved this time to Beirut, where he joined Al Ahed FC and finished third in the 2011–12 Lebanese Premier League.

=== Shenyang Shenbei ===
Already in Asia, Vujović next stop was to be China. He signed with Shenyang Shenbei and played with them the entire season of 2012 China League One. His club failed promotion to the Chinese top-league.

=== Petrovac ===
Vujović was back home where he played with OFK Petrovac the first half of the 2013–14 Montenegrin First League.

=== Persib Bandung ===
He was signed by Persib Bandung on 11 December 2013 and stayed the next 4 years. After 19 years, in his first season in the club, Persib Bandung became Champion of Indonesian Super League 2014 and Vladimir was chosen as a best defender in Indonesia. In October 2015, Vladimir with Persib Bandung achieved one more trophy, this time became Champion of President cup, first ever played in Indonesia. On 1 December 2017, Vujovic finished contract with Persib Bandung after 4 seasons.

=== Bhayangkara ===
On 8 December 2018, he officially announced his retirement from professional football after successful season with Bhayangkara Presisi Indonesia F.C. where he collected 32 matches and scored 2 goals.

== International career ==
Vujović made his debut for Montenegro in his country's first ever competitive match on 24 March 2007, a friendly against Hungary in Podgorica. He has earned a total of 3 caps, scoring no goals. His final international was a June 2007 Kirin Cup match against Colombia.

== Managerial career ==
=== PSIM ===
On 16 January 2019, one month after his retirement as a football player, Vladimir was appointed as a Head coach of Bogor FC in Liga 2, and after two months he leave Bogor with all 22 players to club PSIM Yogyakarta based on mutual consent. He resigned as a coach of PSIM on 9 July 2019.

=== Salam Zgharta ===
On 1 June 2021, Vujović signed a one-year deal as Head coach of Lebanese Second Division club Salam Zgharta. He helped them again promotion to the Lebanese Premier League.

=== Borneo Fc ===
After a successful season in Lebanon, where he promoted Salam Zgharta to the Lebanese Premier League, on 1 September 2022, Vladimir Vujovic returned to Indonesia, signing a three-year contract with Indonesian Liga 1 team Borneo FC as a Technical Director.

=== Racing Beirut ===
Coming back to Lebanon, on 1 June 2023, signed 2 years deal with new club Racing Beirut in Lebanese Premier League. In his first season in Lebanese Premier League as a Head coach, he successfully lead his team to Play-off stage in Top 6 teams in the country. Due to the war situation in Lebanon, Racing Beirut and Vladimir Vujovic after 1 year mutually terminated contract on 1 September 2024.

=== BG Pathum United ===
In Jun 2025, Vladimir Vujovic signed one year deal with Thai Premier League team BG Pathum United. He successfully led the team in the Thai Premier League and AFC Champions League Two until 1 November 2025, when he and the club mutually parted ways.” On the Februar 01 2026, Vladimir Vujovic came back and signed new, one and half year contract with his former club BG Pathum United and led team to the group stage of AFC Champions League Two for the season 2026/27 with impressive finishing of the season.

== Managerial statistics ==
As of 16 October 2026

Managerial record by team and tenure
Team	Nat.	From	To	Record								Ref.
Team	Nat.	From	To	G	W	D	L	GF	GA	GD	Win %	Ref.
PSIM Yogyakarta	(Indonesia)	1 April 2019	14 July 2019	4	2	0	2	3	3	+0	50.00	
Salam Zgharta	(Lebanon)	1 June 2021	31 March 2022	21	13	4	4	35	16	+19	61.90	
Racing Beirut	(Lebanon)	1 July 2023	30 June 2024	26	3	10	13	29	50	−21	11.54	
BG Pathum United (interim)	(Thailand)	2 October 2025	29 October 2025	5	3	1	1	10	5	+5	60.00	
BG Pathum United	(Thailand)	9 February 2026	16 October 2026	20	8	7	5	29	21	+8	40.00	
Career Total				76	29	22	25	106	95	+11	38.16	

== Honours ==
=== Player ===
Persib Bandung

- Indonesia Super League: 2014
- President's Cup: 2015

Mogren

- Montenegrin Cup: 2007–08

Al Ahed

- Lebanese Elite Cup: 2011
- Lebanese Super Cup: 2011

=== Manager ===
Salam Zgharta

- Lebanese Premier League Promoted / Runner up: 2021/22

BG Pathum United

- Thai League Cup runner-up: 2025–26
- Led BG Pathum United to the 2026–27 AFC Champions League Two group stage.
