= Football at the 2019 SEA Games – Men's team squads =

Below are the squads for the Football at the 2019 SEA Games - men's tournament, hosted by the Philippines, which took place from 25 November to 10 December 2019.

The men's tournament will be an under-22 international tournament (born on or after 1 January 1997), with a maximum of two overage players allowed. Each participating nation's squad are to be composed of maximum of 20 players.

== Group A ==
=== Philippines ===
Head coach: (Serbia) Goran Milojević

No.	Pos.	Player	Date of birth (age)	Club
1	GK	Anthony Pinthus	4 April 1998 (aged 21)	(Swiss Football Association) Kosova Zürich
2	DF	Elias Mordal	20 January 1998 (aged 21)	Unattached
3	DF	Marco Casambre	18 December 1998 (aged 20)	(Football Association of Thailand) Chainat Hornbill
4	DF	Jordan Jarvis	17 April 1998 (aged 21)	(Football Association of Hong Kong, China) Resources Capital
5	DF	Dennis Chung	24 January 2001 (aged 18)	(German Football Association) Hertha Zehlendorf
6	MF	Griffin McDaniel	30 March 2000 (aged 19)	(United States Soccer Federation) California Baptist University
7	MF	Troy Limbo	17 November 1998 (aged 21)	Unattached
8	MF	Dylan de Bruycker	5 December 1997 (aged 21)	(Philippine Football Federation) Ceres–Negros
9	FW	Chima Uzoka	12 June 1998 (aged 21)	Unattached
10	DF	Justin Baas	16 March 2000 (aged 19)	(Royal Dutch Football Association) Jong AZ
11	MF	Yrick Gallantes	14 January 2001 (aged 18)	(Scottish Football Association) Gala Fairydean Rovers
12	DF	Amani Aguinaldo^{OA}	24 April 1995 (aged 24)	(Football Association of Malaysia) PKNP
13	FW	Mariano Suba Jr.	2 January 2000 (aged 19)	(Philippine Football Federation) San Beda University
14	FW	Javier Gayoso	11 February 1997 (aged 22)	(Philippine Football Federation) Ateneo de Manila University
15	DF	Mar Diano	24 July 1997 (aged 22)	(Philippine Football Federation) Mendiola
16	MF	Pocholo Bugas	3 December 2001 (aged 17)	(Philippine Football Federation) Far Eastern University
17	MF	Stephan Schröck^{OA} (captain)	21 August 1986 (aged 33)	(Philippine Football Federation) Ceres–Negros
18	MF	Christian Rontini	20 July 1999 (aged 20)	(Italian Football Federation) Sangiovannese
19	MF	Jerome Marzan	12 June 1997 (aged 22)	(Philippine Football Federation) San Beda University
20	GK	Michael Asong	3 October 1998 (aged 21)	(Philippine Football Federation) San Beda University

=== Malaysia ===
Head coach: (Malaysia) Ong Kim Swee

No.	Pos.	Player	Date of birth (age)	Club
1	GK	Haziq Nadzli	6 January 1998 (aged 21)	(Football Association of Malaysia) Johor Darul Ta'zim
2	DF	Adam Nor Azlin^{OA} (captain)	5 January 1996 (aged 23)	(Football Association of Malaysia) Johor Darul Ta'zim
3	DF	Dominic Tan	12 March 1997 (aged 22)	(Football Association of Thailand) Police Tero
4	MF	Quentin Cheng	20 November 1999 (aged 20)	(Football Australia) Central Coast Mariners Academy
5	MF	Harith Haiqal	22 June 2002 (aged 17)	(Football Association of Malaysia) Mokhtar Dahari Academy
6	MF	Danial Haqim	29 August 1998 (aged 21)	(Football Association of Malaysia) Kelantan
7	FW	Faisal Halim	7 January 1998 (aged 21)	(Football Association of Malaysia) Pahang
8	DF	Shahrul Nizam	25 May 1998 (aged 21)	(Football Association of Malaysia) Kelantan
9	FW	Hadi Fayyadh	22 January 2000 (aged 19)	(Japan Football Association) Fagiano Okayama
10	FW	Kogileswaran Raj	21 September 1998 (aged 21)	(Football Association of Malaysia) Pahang
11	MF	Nik Akif	11 May 1999 (aged 20)	(Football Association of Malaysia) Kelantan
12	FW	Luqman Hakim Shamsudin	5 March 2002 (aged 17)	(Royal Belgian Football Association) Kortrijk
13	DF	Dinesh Rajasingam	13 February 1998 (aged 21)	(Football Association of Malaysia) Pahang
14	MF	Syamer Kutty Abba	1 October 1997 (aged 22)	(Football Association of Malaysia) Johor Darul Ta'zim
15	MF	Umar Hakeem	26 August 2002 (aged 17)	(Football Association of Malaysia) Mokhtar Dahari Academy
16	MF	Danial Amier Norhisham	27 March 1997 (aged 22)	(Football Association of Malaysia) FELDA United
17	DF	Irfan Zakaria^{OA}	4 June 1995 (aged 24)	(Football Association of Malaysia) Kuala Lumpur
18	GK	Damien Lim	15 February 1997 (aged 22)	(Football Association of Malaysia) PKNS
19	FW	Akhyar Rashid	1 May 1999 (aged 20)	(Football Association of Malaysia) Johor Darul Ta'zim
20	DF	Syahmi Safari	5 February 1998 (aged 21)	(Football Association of Malaysia) Selangor

=== Myanmar ===
Head coach: (Bulgaria) Velizar Popov

No.	Pos.	Player	Date of birth (age)	Club
1	GK	Soe Arkar	1 August 1997 (aged 22)	(Myanmar Football Federation) Magwe
2	DF	Win Moe Kyaw	1 February 1997 (aged 22)	(Myanmar Football Federation) Magwe
3	DF	Ye Min Thu	18 February 1998 (aged 21)	(Myanmar Football Federation) Shan United
4	DF	Soe Moe Kyaw	23 March 1999 (aged 19)	(Myanmar Football Federation) Ayeyawady United
5	DF	Ye Yint Aung	26 February 1998 (aged 21)	(Myanmar Football Federation) Yadanarbon
6	MF	Hlaing Bo Bo^{OA} (captain)	12 June 1996 (aged 23)	(Myanmar Football Federation) Yadanarbon
7	MF	Lwin Moe Aung	10 December 1999 (aged 19)	(Myanmar Football Federation) Ayeyawady United
8	MF	Myat Kaung Khant	15 July 2000 (aged 19)	(Myanmar Football Federation) Yadanarbon
9	MF	Sithu Aung^{OA}	16 November 1996 (aged 23)	(Myanmar Football Federation) Yadanarbon
10	FW	Win Naing Tun	3 May 2000 (aged 19)	(Myanmar Football Federation) Yadanarbon
11	MF	Zin Min Tun	5 May 1998 (aged 21)	(Myanmar Football Federation) Magwe
12	DF	Aung Wunna Soe	19 April 2000 (aged 19)	(Myanmar Football Federation) Zwegabin United
13	FW	Aung Kaung Mann	18 February 1998 (aged 21)	(Myanmar Football Federation) Ayeyawady United
14	DF	Thu Rein Soe	4 September 1998 (aged 21)	(Myanmar Football Federation) Yangon United
15	MF	Aung Naing Win	1 June 1997 (aged 22)	(Myanmar Football Federation) Yadanarbon
16	MF	Kaung Htet Soe	1 June 1997 (aged 22)	(Myanmar Football Federation) Yangon United
17	MF	Soe Lwin Lwin	13 August 1998 (aged 21)	(Myanmar Football Federation) Magwe
18	GK	Sann Satt Naing	4 November 1997 (aged 22)	(Myanmar Football Federation) Yangon United
19	FW	Htet Phyo Wai	21 January 2000 (aged 19)	(Myanmar Football Federation) Shan United
20	MF	Nay Moe Naing	28 November 1998 (aged 20)	(Myanmar Football Federation) Magwe

=== Cambodia ===
Head coach: (Argentina) Félix Dalmás

No.	Pos.	Player	Date of birth (age)	Club
2	DF	Ken Chansopheak	15 June 1998 (aged 21)	(Football Federation of Cambodia) Phnom Penh Crown
3	DF	Sath Rosib	7 July 1997 (aged 22)	(Football Federation of Cambodia) Boeung Ket Angkor
5	MF	Kan Pisal	9 August 1998 (aged 21)	(Football Federation of Cambodia) National Defense
6	MF	Tes Sambath	20 October 2000 (aged 19)	(Football Federation of Cambodia) Boeung Ket Angkor
7	FW	Mao Piset	17 February 2000 (aged 19)	(Football Federation of Cambodia) Phnom Penh Crown
8	MF	Orn Chanpolin (captain)	15 March 1998 (aged 21)	(Football Federation of Cambodia) Phnom Penh Crown
9	FW	Reung Bunheing^{OA}	25 September 1992 (aged 27)	(Football Federation of Cambodia) National Defense
11	MF	Sin Kakada	29 July 2000 (aged 19)	(Football Federation of Cambodia) Phnom Penh Crown
12	MF	In Sodavid	2 July 1998 (aged 21)	(Football Federation of Cambodia) Phnom Penh Crown
13	DF	Ouk Sovann	15 May 1998 (aged 21)	(Football Federation of Cambodia) Phnom Penh Crown
14	FW	Keo Sokpheng^{OA}	3 March 1992 (aged 27)	(Football Federation of Cambodia) Visakha
15	DF	Yue Safy	4 September 1998 (aged 21)	(Football Federation of Cambodia) Phnom Penh Crown
16	MF	Chea Vesley	5 November 1998 (aged 21)	(Football Federation of Cambodia) Boeung Ket Angkor
17	FW	Sieng Chanthea	9 September 2002 (aged 17)	(Football Federation of Cambodia) Bati Academy
18	DF	Seut Baraing	29 September 1999 (aged 20)	(Football Federation of Cambodia) Phnom Penh Crown
19	DF	Cheng Meng	7 February 1998 (aged 20)	(Football Federation of Cambodia) Nagaworld
20	MF	Yeu Muslim	25 December 1998 (aged 20)	(Football Federation of Cambodia) Phnom Penh Crown
21	GK	Hul Kimhuy	7 April 2000 (aged 19)	(Football Federation of Cambodia) Boeung Ket Angkor
22	GK	Keo Soksela	1 August 1997 (aged 22)	(Football Federation of Cambodia) Visakha
23	DF	Sin Sophanat	20 April 1997 (aged 21)	(Football Federation of Cambodia) Visakha

=== Timor-Leste ===
Head coach: (Portugal) Fabiano Flora

No.	Pos.	Player	Date of birth (age)	Club
1	GK	Aderito Raul Fernandes	15 May 1997 (aged 22)	(East Timor Football Federation) Ponta Leste
2	DF	Julião	2 July 1998 (aged 21)	(East Timor Football Federation) Boavista
3	DF	José Silva	24 April 1998 (aged 21)	(East Timor Football Federation) Boavista
4	DF	Candido	2 December 1997 (aged 21)	(East Timor Football Federation) Ponta Leste
5	DF	João Panji	29 October 2000 (aged 19)	(East Timor Football Federation) Assalam
6	MF	Nataniel Reis^{OA} (captain)	24 March 1995 (aged 24)	(East Timor Football Federation) Boavista
7	MF	Rufino Gama	20 June 1998 (aged 21)	(East Timor Football Federation) Karketu Dili
8	MF	João Pedro	24 June 1998 (aged 21)	(Football Association of Thailand) North Bangkok University
9	FW	Edit Savio^{OA}	28 August 1992 (aged 27)	(East Timor Football Federation) Boavista
10	MF	Henrique Cruz	6 December 1997 (aged 21)	(East Timor Football Federation) Boavista
15	DF	Armindo de Almeida	18 April 1998 (aged 21)	(East Timor Football Federation) Académica
17	MF	Elias Mesquita	27 March 2002 (aged 17)	(East Timor Football Federation) Lalenok United
18	MF	Filomeno Junior	5 August 2000 (aged 19)	(East Timor Football Federation) SLB Laulara
20	GK	Fagio Augusto	29 April 1997 (aged 22)	(East Timor Football Federation) Karketu Dili
21	FW	Frangcyatma Alves	27 January 1997 (aged 22)	(East Timor Football Federation) DIT
22	DF	Nelson Viegas	24 December 1999 (aged 19)	(East Timor Football Federation) Carsae
23	MF	Osvaldo Belo	18 October 2000 (aged 19)	(East Timor Football Federation) Karketu Dili

== Group B ==
=== Thailand ===
Head coach: (Japan) Akira Nishino

No.	Pos.	Player	Date of birth (age)	Club
1	GK	Korraphat Nareechan	7 October 1997 (aged 22)	(Football Association of Thailand) BG Pathum United
2	DF	Jaturapat Sattham	15 June 1999 (aged 20)	(Football Association of Thailand) Buriram United
3	DF	Thitathorn Aksornsri	8 November 1997 (aged 22)	(Football Association of Thailand) Police Tero
4	DF	Chatchai Saengdao	11 January 1997 (aged 22)	(Football Association of Thailand) Muangthong United
5	DF	Shinnaphat Leeaoh	2 February 1997 (aged 22)	(Football Association of Thailand) Chiangrai United
6	MF	Ratthanakorn Maikami	1 January 1998 (aged 21)	(Football Association of Thailand) Buriram United
7	MF	Wisarut Imura	18 October 1997 (aged 22)	(Football Association of Thailand) Bangkok United
8	MF	Worachit Kanitsribampen	24 August 1997 (aged 22)	(Football Association of Thailand) Chonburi
9	FW	Supachai Chaided	1 December 1998 (aged 20)	(Football Association of Thailand) Buriram United
10	MF	Supachok Sarachat	22 May 1998 (aged 21)	(Football Association of Thailand) Buriram United
11	MF	Anon Amornlerdsak	6 November 1997 (aged 22)	(Football Association of Thailand) Bangkok United
12	DF	Sarayut Sompim	23 March 1997 (aged 22)	(Football Association of Thailand) Buriram United
13	MF	Jaroensak Wonggorn	18 May 1997 (aged 22)	(Football Association of Thailand) Samut Prakan City
14	DF	Peerawat Akkatam	3 December 1998 (aged 20)	(Football Association of Thailand) Buriram United
15	DF	Saringkan Promsupa	29 March 1997 (aged 22)	(Football Association of Thailand) Muangthong United
16	MF	Chatmongkol Thongkiri	5 May 1997 (aged 22)	(Football Association of Thailand) Chainat Hornbill
17	FW	Suphanat Mueanta	2 August 2002 (aged 17)	(Football Association of Thailand) Buriram United
18	MF	Kritsada Kaman	18 March 1999 (aged 20)	(Football Association of Thailand) Chonburi
19	FW	Sittichok Paso	28 January 1999 (aged 20)	(Football Association of Thailand) Chonburi
20	GK	Nont Muangngam	20 April 1997 (aged 22)	(Football Association of Thailand) Chiangrai United

=== Indonesia ===
Head coach: (Indonesia) Indra Sjafri

No.	Pos.	Player	Date of birth (age)	Club
1	GK	Muhammad Riyandi	3 January 2000 (aged 19)	(Football Association of Indonesia) Barito Putera
2	DF	Andy Setyo (captain)	16 September 1997 (aged 22)	(Football Association of Indonesia) TIRA-Persikabo
3	DF	Dodi Alekvan Djin	31 December 1998 (aged 20)	(Football Association of Indonesia) Persik Kediri
4	DF	Nurhidayat	5 April 1999 (aged 20)	(Football Association of Indonesia) Bhayangkara
5	DF	Bagas Adi	8 March 1997 (aged 22)	(Football Association of Indonesia) Bhayangkara
6	MF	Evan Dimas^{OA}	15 March 1995 (aged 24)	(Football Association of Indonesia) Barito Putera
7	MF	Zulfiandi^{OA}	17 July 1995 (aged 24)	(Football Association of Indonesia) Madura United
8	MF	Witan Sulaeman	8 October 2001 (aged 18)	(Football Association of Indonesia) PSIM Yogyakarta
9	FW	Muhammad Rafli	24 November 1998 (aged 21)	(Football Association of Indonesia) Arema
10	FW	Egy Maulana	7 July 2000 (aged 19)	(Polish Football Association) Lechia Gdańsk
11	DF	Firza Andika	11 May 1999 (aged 20)	(Football Association of Indonesia) PSM Makassar
12	GK	Nadeo Argawinata	9 March 1997 (aged 22)	(Football Association of Indonesia) Borneo
13	DF	Rachmat Irianto	3 September 1999 (aged 20)	(Football Association of Indonesia) Persebaya Surabaya
14	DF	Asnawi Mangkualam	4 October 1999 (aged 20)	(Football Association of Indonesia) PSM Makassar
15	MF	Saddil Ramdani	2 January 1999 (aged 20)	(Football Association of Malaysia) Pahang
16	MF	Sani Rizki	7 January 1998 (aged 21)	(Football Association of Indonesia) Bhayangkara
17	MF	Syahrian Abimanyu	25 April 1999 (aged 20)	(Football Association of Indonesia) Madura United
18	MF	Irkham Milla	2 May 1998 (aged 21)	(Football Association of Indonesia) PS Sleman
19	MF	Feby Eka Putra	12 February 1999 (aged 20)	(Football Association of Indonesia) Persija Jakarta
20	FW	Osvaldo Haay	17 May 1998 (aged 21)	(Football Association of Indonesia) Persebaya Surabaya

=== Vietnam ===
Head coach: (South Korea) Park Hang-seo

No.	Pos.	Player	Date of birth (age)	Club
1	GK	Bùi Tiến Dũng	28 February 1997 (aged 22)	(Vietnam Football Federation) Hà Nội
2	DF	Đỗ Thanh Thịnh	18 August 1998 (aged 21)	(Vietnam Football Federation) SHB Đà Nẵng
3	DF	Huỳnh Tấn Sinh	6 April 1998 (aged 21)	(Vietnam Football Federation) Quảng Nam
4	DF	Hồ Tấn Tài	6 November 1997 (aged 22)	(Vietnam Football Federation) Becamex Bình Dương
5	DF	Đoàn Văn Hậu	19 April 1999 (aged 20)	(Royal Dutch Football Association) Heerenveen
6	DF	Lê Ngọc Bảo	27 March 1998 (aged 21)	(Vietnam Football Federation) Phố Hiến
7	MF	Triệu Việt Hưng	19 January 1997 (aged 22)	(Vietnam Football Federation) Hoàng Anh Gia Lai
8	MF	Nguyễn Trọng Hoàng^{OA}	14 April 1989 (aged 30)	(Vietnam Football Federation) Viettel
9	FW	Hà Đức Chinh	22 September 1997 (aged 22)	(Vietnam Football Federation) SHB Đà Nẵng
11	MF	Trần Thanh Sơn	30 December 1997 (aged 21)	(Vietnam Football Federation) Hòang Anh Gia Lai
12	MF	Trương Văn Thái Quý	20 August 1997 (aged 22)	(Vietnam Football Federation) Hà Nội
14	MF	Nguyễn Hoàng Đức	11 January 1998 (aged 21)	(Vietnam Football Federation) Viettel
16	MF	Đỗ Hùng Dũng^{OA} (vice-captain)	8 September 1993 (aged 26)	(Vietnam Football Federation) Hà Nội
18	DF	Nguyễn Thành Chung	8 September 1997 (aged 22)	(Vietnam Football Federation) Hà Nội
19	MF	Nguyễn Quang Hải (captain)	12 April 1997 (aged 22)	(Vietnam Football Federation) Hà Nội
20	MF	Nguyễn Trọng Hùng	3 October 1997 (aged 22)	(Vietnam Football Federation) Thanh Hóa
21	DF	Nguyễn Đức Chiến	24 August 1998 (aged 21)	(Vietnam Football Federation) Viettel
22	FW	Nguyễn Tiến Linh	20 October 1997 (aged 22)	(Vietnam Football Federation) Becamex Bình Dương
23	MF	Bùi Tiến Dụng	23 November 1998 (aged 21)	(Vietnam Football Federation) SHB Đà Nẵng
30	GK	Nguyễn Văn Toản	26 November 1999 (aged 19)	(Vietnam Football Federation) Hải Phòng

=== Laos ===
Head coach: (Singapore) V. Sundramoorthy

No.	Pos.	Player	Date of birth (age)	Club
1	GK	Solasak Thilavong	3 November 2003 (aged 16)	(Lao Football Federation) Young Elephants
2	DF	Bounphithak Chanthalangsy	10 September 1998 (aged 21)	(Lao Football Federation) Lao Toyota
3	DF	Anantaza Siphongphan	9 November 2004 (aged 15)	(Lao Football Federation) Ezra
4	DF	Xayasith Singsavang	17 December 2000 (aged 18)	(Lao Football Federation) Young Elephants
5	MF	Alounnay Lounlasy	8 July 2003 (aged 16)	(Lao Football Federation) Lao Toyota
6	DF	Kittisak Phomvongsa	27 July 1999 (aged 20)	(Lao Football Federation) Young Elephants
7	FW	Soukaphone Vongchiengkham^{OA} (captain)	9 March 1992 (aged 27)	(Football Association of Thailand) Prachuap
8	MF	Chanthachone Thinolath	5 February 1999 (aged 20)	(Lao Football Federation) Young Elephants
9	FW	Somxay Keohanam	27 July 1998 (aged 21)	(Lao Football Federation) Young Elephants
10	MF	Phithack Kongmathilath^{OA}	6 August 1996 (aged 23)	(Football Association of Thailand) Ayutthaya United
11	MF	Loungleuang Keophouvong	26 June 1997 (aged 22)	(Lao Football Federation) Young Elephants
12	FW	Vannasone Douangmaity	15 March 1997 (aged 22)	(Lao Football Federation) Young Elephants
13	MF	Thanouthong Kietnalonglop	5 March 2001 (aged 18)	(Lao Football Federation) Vientiane
14	MF	Somsavath Sophabmixay	25 May 1997 (aged 22)	(Lao Football Federation) Lao Toyota
15	DF	Aphixay Thanakhanty	15 July 1998 (aged 21)	(Lao Football Federation) Young Elephants
16	MF	Somlith Sengvanny	5 August 1999 (aged 20)	(Lao Football Federation) Young Elephants
17	FW	Bounphachan Bounkong	29 November 2000 (aged 18)	(Lao Football Federation) Young Elephants
18	GK	Xaysavath Souvanhnasok	3 September 1999 (aged 20)	(Lao Football Federation) Young Elephants
19	DF	Kaharn Phetsivilay	9 September 1998 (aged 21)	(Lao Football Federation) Young Elephants
20	DF	Vanna Bounlovongsa	21 November 1998 (aged 21)	(Lao Football Federation) Young Elephants

=== Singapore ===
Head coach: (Singapore) Fandi Ahmad

No.	Pos.	Player	Date of birth (age)	Club
3	DF	Irfan Najeeb	31 July 1999 (aged 20)	(Football Association of Singapore) Garena Young Lions
4	DF	Ryhan Stewart	15 February 2000 (aged 19)	(Football Association of Singapore) Warriors FC
5	DF	Lionel Tan	5 June 1997 (aged 22)	(Football Association of Singapore) Garena Young Lions
6	MF	Jacob Mahler	10 April 2000 (aged 19)	(Football Association of Singapore) Garena Young Lions
7	DF	Zulqarnaen Suzliman	29 March 1998 (aged 21)	(Football Association of Singapore) Garena Young Lions
8	MF	Joshua Pereira	10 October 1997 (aged 22)	(Football Association of Singapore) Garena Young Lions
9	FW	Ikhsan Fandi	9 April 1999 (aged 20)	(Norwegian Football Federation) Raufoss IL
10	FW	Faris Ramli^{OA}	24 August 1992 (aged 27)	(Football Association of Malaysia) Terengganu
11	FW	Haiqal Pashia	29 November 1998 (aged 20)	(Football Association of Singapore) Garena Young Lions
12	DF	Syahrul Sazali	3 June 1998 (aged 21)	(Football Association of Singapore) Garena Young Lions
13	DF	Jordan Vestering	25 September 2000 (aged 19)	(Football Association of Singapore) Hougang United
14	MF	Hami Syahin	16 December 1998 (aged 20)	(Football Association of Singapore) Home United
15	MF	Shah Shahiran	14 November 1999 (aged 20)	(Football Association of Singapore) Tampines Rovers
16	MF	Naqiuddin Eunos	12 January 1997 (aged 22)	(Football Association of Singapore) Garena Young Lions
17	DF	Irfan Fandi (captain)	13 August 1997 (aged 22)	(Football Association of Thailand) BG Pathum United
18	GK	Zharfan Rohaizad	21 February 1997 (aged 22)	(Football Association of Singapore) Garena Young Lions
20	MF	Saifullah Akbar	31 January 1999 (aged 20)	(Football Association of Singapore) Garena Young Lions
21	MF	Nur Luqman	20 June 1998 (aged 21)	(Football Association of Singapore) Garena Young Lions
23	GK	Kenji Rusydi	12 July 1998 (aged 21)	(Football Association of Singapore) Garena Young Lions
27	DF	Tajeli Salamat^{OA}	7 February 1994 (aged 25)	(Football Association of Singapore) Warriors FC

=== Brunei ===
Head coach: (Brunei) Aminuddin Jumat

No.	Pos.	Player	Date of birth (age)	Club
1	GK	Haimie Anak Nyaring	31 May 1998 (aged 21)	(Football Association of Brunei Darussalam) DPMM FC
2	DF	Alimuddin Jamaludin	9 August 1997 (aged 22)	(Football Association of Brunei Darussalam) Jerudong FC
3	DF	Abdul Syakir Basri	2 October 1997 (aged 22)	(Football Association of Brunei Darussalam) Wijaya FC
4	DF	Nazif Safwan Jaini	18 August 2000 (aged 19)	(Football Association of Brunei Darussalam) DPMM FC Academy
5	DF	Hafiz Suhardi	10 May 2001 (aged 18)	(Football Association of Brunei Darussalam) DPMM FC Academy
6	DF	Wafi Aminuddin	20 September 2000 (aged 19)	(Football Association of Brunei Darussalam) DPMM FC
7	MF	Nur Asyraffahmi Norsamri	4 May 2000 (aged 19)	(Football Association of Brunei Darussalam) Kota Ranger FC
8	MF	Nur Ikhmal Damit^{OA}	5 March 1993 (aged 26)	(Football Association of Brunei Darussalam) Indera SC
9	FW	Faiq Bolkiah (captain)	9 May 1998 (aged 21)	(The Football Association) Leicester City
10	MF	Nazirrudin Ismail	27 December 1998 (aged 20)	(Football Association of Brunei Darussalam) Indera SC
11	MF	Hanif Farhan Azman	2 November 2000 (aged 19)	(Football Association of Brunei Darussalam) DPMM FC Academy
12	FW	Hakeme Yazid Said	8 February 2003 (aged 16)	(Football Association of Brunei Darussalam) DPMM FC
13	DF	Ridhwan Nokman	10 May 2000 (aged 19)	(Football Association of Brunei Darussalam) Indera SC
14	MF	Haziq Kasyful Azim Hasimulabdillah	24 December 1998 (aged 20)	(Football Association of Brunei Darussalam) DPMM FC Academy
15	DF	Rahimin Abdul Ghani	31 May 1999 (aged 20)	(Football Association of Brunei Darussalam) Kasuka FC
16	MF	Abdul Hariz Herman	24 September 2000 (aged 19)	(Football Association of Brunei Darussalam) Kasuka FC
17	MF	Amin Sisa	2 January 1998 (aged 21)	(Football Association of Brunei Darussalam) Kasuka FC
18	GK	Ishyra Asmin Jabidi	9 July 1998 (aged 21)	(Football Association of Brunei Darussalam) DPMM FC
19	FW	Hanif Aiman Adanan	4 March 2000 (aged 19)	(Football Association of Brunei Darussalam) Kasuka FC
20	FW	Adi Said^{OA}	15 October 1990 (aged 29)	(Football Association of Brunei Darussalam) DPMM FC
