= Football at the 2019 SEA Games =

Football competition at the 30th SEA Games

- Venues: Rizal Memorial Stadium, Manila; Biñan Football Stadium, Biñan; City of Imus Grandstand, Imus
- Dates: November 25 – December 10
- Nations: 11

Medalists
| gold medal | Vietnam (men); Vietnam (women) |
| silver medal | Indonesia (men); Thailand (women) |
| bronze medal | Myanmar (men); Myanmar (women) |

Football at the 2019 SEA Games were held across three venues in the Philippines; the Rizal Memorial Stadium in Manila, Biñan Football Stadium in Biñan, Laguna, and the City of Imus Grandstand, Imus for the men's tournament. The women's tournament was held in Manila and Biñan.

Vietnam won gold in both men's and women's tournaments, beating Indonesia and Thailand respectively. The 2019 SEA Games also witnessed a fairy-tale run of Cambodia's Team, Finishing 4th

== Participating nations ==
A total of 336 athletes from 11 nations were scheduled to participate (the numbers of athletes are shown in parentheses). Teams from Indonesia, Malaysia, Myanmar, Thailand, Vietnam and hosts the Philippines entered both the men's and women's competition. All other teams played in men's tournament.

| Nation | Men's | Women's |
|---|---|---|
| Brunei | Yes (20) | No |
| Cambodia | Yes (20) | No |
| Indonesia | Yes (20) | Yes (20) |
| Laos | Yes (20) | No |
| Malaysia | Yes (20) | Yes (20) |
| Myanmar | Yes (20) | Yes (20) |
| Philippines | Yes (20) | Yes (20) |
| Singapore | Yes (19) | No |
| Thailand | Yes (20) | Yes (20) |
| Timor-Leste | Yes (18) | No |
| Vietnam | Yes (20) | Yes (20) |
| Total: 11 NOCs | 11 | 6 |

== Competition schedule ==
The men's tournament is being held from November 25 to December 10, 2019 while the women's tournament was held from November 26 to December 8, 2019.

| G | Group stage | ½ | Semifinals | B | 3rd place play-off | F | Final |

| Event | Mon 25 | Tue 26 | Wed 27 | Thu 28 | Fri 29 | Sat 30 | Sun 1 | Mon 2 | Tue 3 | Wed 4 | Thu 5 | Fri 6 | Sat 7 | Sun 8 | | Mon 9 | Tue 10 | |
|---|---|---|---|---|---|---|---|---|---|---|---|---|---|---|---|---|---|---|
| Men | G | G | G | G | G | | G | G | G | G | G | | ½ | | | | B | F |
| Women | | G | | | G | | | G | | | ½ | | | B | F | | | |

== Venues ==
The men's tournament is primarily held in the Rizal Memorial Stadium in Manila. Individual seats and roofing were installed in the spectator's area outside the main grandstand for the Manila stadium. The Biñan Football Stadium in Biñan, Laguna, which hosted select men's football group matches, was the main venue for the women's tournament's group stage, with the latter matches played at Manila as well.

Aside from the two venues, the University of Makati Stadium as well as the pitches at the University of the Philippines, Far Eastern University Diliman, and Carmona are also designated as practice venues for the participating teams.

All venues used artificial turfs which caused a lot of injuries for football players during the tournaments.

| Manila | Biñan | Imus | Football at the 2019 SEA Games (Luzon) |
| Rizal Memorial Stadium | Biñan Football Stadium | City of Imus Grandstand | Football at the 2019 SEA Games (Luzon) |
| Capacity: 12,873 | Capacity: 3,000 | Capacity: 4,800 | Football at the 2019 SEA Games (Luzon) |

== Men's competition ==
=== Group stage ===
- All times are Philippine Standard Time (UTC+8).

==== Group A ====
| Pos | Team | Pld | W | D | L | GF | GA | GD | Pts | Qualification |
|---|---|---|---|---|---|---|---|---|---|---|
| 1 | Myanmar | 4 | 3 | 1 | 0 | 8 | 4 | +4 | 10 | Semi-finals |
| 2 | Cambodia | 4 | 2 | 1 | 1 | 10 | 4 | +6 | 7 | Semi-finals |
| 3 | Philippines (H) | 4 | 2 | 1 | 1 | 9 | 4 | +5 | 7 | |
| 4 | Malaysia | 4 | 1 | 1 | 2 | 6 | 5 | +1 | 4 | |
| 5 | Timor-Leste | 4 | 0 | 0 | 4 | 2 | 18 | −16 | 0 | |

Source: 2019 SEAG (archived)
Rules for classification: 1) Points; 2) Goal difference; 3) Goals scored
(H) Hosts

==== Group B ====
| Pos | Team | Pld | W | D | L | GF | GA | GD | Pts | Qualification |
|---|---|---|---|---|---|---|---|---|---|---|
| 1 | Vietnam | 5 | 4 | 1 | 0 | 17 | 4 | +13 | 13 | Semi-finals |
| 2 | Indonesia | 5 | 4 | 0 | 1 | 17 | 2 | +15 | 12 | Semi-finals |
| 3 | Thailand | 5 | 3 | 1 | 1 | 14 | 4 | +10 | 10 | |
| 4 | Singapore | 5 | 1 | 1 | 3 | 7 | 6 | +1 | 4 | |
| 5 | Laos | 5 | 1 | 1 | 3 | 4 | 12 | −8 | 4 | |
| 6 | Brunei | 5 | 0 | 0 | 5 | 0 | 31 | −31 | 0 | |

Source: 2019 SEAG (archived)
Rules for classification: 1) Points; 2) Goal difference; 3) Goals scored

=== Knockout stage ===
Semi-finals
December 7
Myanmar | 2
Indonesia (a.e.t.) | 4
December 7
Vietnam | 4
Cambodia | 0

Gold medal match
December 10
Indonesia | 0
Vietnam | 3
Bronze medal match
December 10
Myanmar (p) | 2 (5)
Cambodia | 2 (4)

=== Winners ===
2019 SEA Games Men's Tournament
(Vietnam)
Vietnam
Second title

== Women's competition ==
=== Group stage ===
- All times are Philippine Standard Time (UTC+8).

==== Group A ====
| Pos | Team | Pld | W | D | L | GF | GA | GD | Pts | Qualification |
|---|---|---|---|---|---|---|---|---|---|---|
| 1 | Myanmar | 2 | 1 | 1 | 0 | 5 | 0 | +5 | 4 (Note: Fair play points: Myanmar −1, Philippines −3.) | Semi-finals |
| 2 | Philippines (H) | 2 | 1 | 1 | 0 | 5 | 0 | +5 | 4 | Semi-finals |
| 3 | Malaysia | 2 | 0 | 0 | 2 | 0 | 10 | −10 | 0 | |

Source: 2019 SEAG (archived)
Rules for classification: 1) Points; 2) Goal difference; 3) Goals scored; 4) Fair play points
(H) Hosts

==== Group B ====
| Pos | Team | Pld | W | D | L | GF | GA | GD | Pts | Qualification |
|---|---|---|---|---|---|---|---|---|---|---|
| 1 | Vietnam | 2 | 1 | 1 | 0 | 7 | 1 | +6 | 4 | Semi-finals |
| 2 | Thailand | 2 | 1 | 1 | 0 | 6 | 2 | +4 | 4 | Semi-finals |
| 3 | Indonesia | 2 | 0 | 0 | 2 | 1 | 11 | −10 | 0 | |

Source: 2019 SEAG (archived)
Rules for classification: 1) Points; 2) Goal difference; 3) Goals scored; 4) Fair play points

=== Knockout stage ===
Semi-finals
December 5 – Manila
Myanmar | 0
Thailand | 1
December 5 – Biñan
Vietnam | 2
Philippines | 0

Gold medal match
December 8 – Manila
Thailand | 0
Vietnam (a.e.t.) | 1
Bronze medal match
December 8 – Manila
Myanmar | 2
Philippines | 1

=== Winners ===
2019 SEA Games Women's Tournament
(Vietnam)
Vietnam
Sixth title

== Medal summary ==
=== Medal table ===
* Host nation (Philippines)

| Rank | Nation | Gold | Silver | Bronze | Total |
|---|---|---|---|---|---|
| 1 | Vietnam (VIE) | 2 | 0 | 0 | 2 |
| 2 | Indonesia (INA) | 0 | 1 | 0 | 1 |
| 2 | Thailand (THA) | 0 | 1 | 0 | 1 |
| 4 | Myanmar (MYA) | 0 | 0 | 2 | 2 |
| Totals (4 entries) | | 2 | 2 | 2 | 6 |

=== Medalists ===
| Event | Gold | Silver | Bronze |
|---|---|---|---|
| Men's tournament | Vietnam; Bùi Tiến Dũng; Đỗ Thanh Thịnh; Huỳnh Tấn Sinh; Hồ Tấn Tài; Đoàn Văn Hậu; Lê Ngọc Bảo; Triệu Việt Hưng; Nguyễn Trọng Hoàng; Hà Đức Chinh; Trần Thanh Sơn; Trương Văn Thái Quý; Nguyễn Hoàng Đức; Đỗ Hùng Dũng; Nguyễn Thành Chung; Nguyễn Quang Hải; Nguyễn Trọng Hùng; Nguyễn Đức Chiến; Nguyễn Tiến Linh; Bùi Tiến Dụng; Nguyễn Văn Toản | Indonesia; Muhammad Riyandi; Andy Setyo; Dodi Alekvan Djin; Nurhidayat; Bagas Adi; Evan Dimas; Zulfiandi; Witan Sulaeman; Muhammad Rafli; Egy Maulana; Firza Andika; Nadeo Argawinata; Rachmat Irianto; Asnawi Mangkualam; Saddil Ramdani; Sani Rizki; Syahrian Abimanyu; Irkham Milla; Feby Eka Putra; Osvaldo Haay | Myanmar; Soe Arkar; Win Moe Kyaw; Ye Min Thu; Soe Moe Kyaw; Ye Yint Aung; Hlaing Bo Bo; Lwin Moe Aung; Myat Kaung Khant; Sithu Aung; Win Naing Tun; Zin Min Tun; Aung Wunna Soe; Aung Kaung Mann; Thu Rein Soe; Aung Naing Win; Kaung Htet Soe; Soe Lwin Lwin; Sann Satt Naing; Htet Phyo Wai; Nay Moe Naing |
| Women's tournament | Vietnam; Huỳnh Như; Trần Thị Kim Thanh; Trần Thị Hồng Nhung; Phạm Thị Tươi; Chương Thị Kiều; Nguyễn Thị Xuyến; Nguyễn Thị Tuyết Dung; Nguyễn Thị Bích Thùy; Dương Thị Vân; Thái Thị Thảo; Trần Thị Phương Thảo; Phạm Hải Yến; Khổng Thị Hằng; Hoàng Thị Loan; Lê Thị Diễm My; Nguyễn Thị Liễu; Vũ Thị Nhung; Trần Nguyễn Bảo Châu; Vũ Thị Thúy; Nguyễn Thị Vạn | Thailand; Waraporn Boonsing; Warunee Phetwiset; Phonphirun Pilawan; Natthakarn Chinwong; Khwanrudi Saengchan; Wilaiporn Boothduang; Rattikan Thongsombut; Orapin Waenngoen; Jaruwan Chaiyarak; Kanyanat Chetthabutr; Taneekarn Dangda; Yada Sengyong; Suchawadee Nildhamrong; Saruda Konfay; Sunisa Srangthaisong; Ainon Phancha; Pitsamai Sornsai; Silawan Intamee; Pikul Khueanpet; Kanjana Sungngoen | Myanmar; Khin Marlar Tun; Mya Phu Ngon; Khin Than Wai; Khaing Thazin; Ei Yadanar Phyo; Chit Chit; Myat Noe Khin; Khin Mo Mo Tun; Win Theingi Tun; Khin Moe Wai; Yee Yee Oo; Wai Wai Aung; Nge Nge Htwe; July Kyaw; Aye Aye Moe; Nu Nu; May Zin Nwe; Phyu Phyu Win; Thin Thin Yu; San Thaw Thaw |
