= Osvaldo Haay =

Indonesian footballer (born 1997)

Personal information
- Full name: Osvaldo Ardiles Haay
- Date of birth: 1 May 1997 (age 29)
- Place of birth: Jayapura, Indonesia
- Height: 1.71 m (5 ft 7 in)
- Positions: Left winger; forward

Team information
- Current team: Persekabpas Pasuruan

Youth career
- 2015–2016: Persipura Jayapura

Senior career*
Years	Team	Apps	(Gls)
2016–2017	Persipura Jayapura	39	(11)
2018–2019	Persebaya Surabaya	41	(15)
2020–2023	Persija Jakarta	39	(3)
2023–2024	Bhayangkara	5	(0)
2025	Persela Lamongan	8	(1)
2026–	Persekabpas Pasuruan	0	(0)

International career
2017–2019	Indonesia U23	34	(11)
2017–2021	Indonesia	6	(0)
Medal record
Men's football
Representing Indonesia
Southeast Asian Games
Bronze medal – third place	2017 Kuala Lumpur	Team
Silver medal – second place	2019 Philippines	Team
AFF U-22 Youth Championship
Winner	2019 Cambodia	Team
- * Club domestic league appearances and goals as of 16 November 2025

Osvaldo Ardiles Haay (born 1 May 1997) is an Indonesian professional footballer who plays as a left winger or forward for Liga Nusantara club Persekabpas Pasuruan.

== Club career ==
=== Persipura Jayapura ===
Osvaldo Haay in 2016 at the age of 18 earned a spot in Persipura Jayapura's senior team that competed in the 2016 Indonesia Soccer Championship A. Starting in a match against Arema Cronus, Haay scored his first goal in a professional game on 24 October 2016.

=== Persebaya Surabaya ===
As a rising star, Haay received offers from several clubs for the 2018 Liga 1 competition. He chose to play for Persebaya in the East Java provincial capital of Surabaya where he made 41 league appearances and scored 16 goals in two consecutive seasons.

=== Persija Jakarta ===
Haay in 2020 signed a contract with affluent Liga 1 club Persija Jakarta for the 2020 Liga 1 season that only lasted for three matches due to the COVID-19 pandemic. He stayed with Persija for the 2021 Menpora Cup, a prelude tournament for Liga 1 teams ahead of the 2021 season. Persija won that tournament with Haay scoring a goal and delivering an assist in the final match.

== International career ==
Haay made his international senior debut for Indonesia on 21 March 2017, against Myanmar, where he came as a substitute. He scored his debut goal on 4 December 2017, against Mongolia. Haay was part of the Indonesia under-23 national team that won silver in the 2019 Southeast Asian Games in the Philippines, in which he was the top goalscorer with eight goals.

== Personal life ==
Haay's mother, Buanitawati, is a Javanese from the East Java region of Banyuwangi while his father, Edison Haay, is a Kayupulau from Papua, where the family resides. Haay was raised in Jayapura, but he understands some Javanese language from his mother that became handy when the footballer played in Surabaya, East Java's capital. Osvaldo is a devout Christian with tattoos of crosses to show. Haay has two brothers, Jefry Haay and Jeremiah Denilson Haay. Haay is married to Shella Pricilia. The couple had their wedding on 27 February 2021.

== Career statistics ==
=== Club ===
As of 16 November 2025

Club	Season	League		Cup (Note: Includes Piala Indonesia)		Continental		Other		Total	
Club	Season	Apps	Goals	Apps	Goals	Apps	Goals	Apps	Goals	Apps	Goals
Persipura Jayapura	2016	17	5	–		–		–		17	5
Persipura Jayapura	2017	22	6	–		–		3	0	22	6
Persipura Jayapura	Total	39	11	0	0	0	0	3	0	42	11
Persebaya Surabaya	2018	21	9	2	2	–		3	0	26	11
Persebaya Surabaya	2019	20	6	5	1	–		2 (Note: Appearances in Indonesia President's Cup)	1	27	8
Persebaya Surabaya	Total	41	15	7	2	0	0	5	1	53	19
Persija Jakarta	2020	2	1	–	–	–		–		2	1
Persija Jakarta	2021–22	26	1	–	–	–		8 (Note: Appearances in Menpora Cup)	3	34	4
Persija Jakarta	2022–23	11	1	–	–	–		0	0	11	1
Persija Jakarta	Total	39	3	0	0	0	0	8	3	47	6
Bhayangkara	2023–24	5	0	–	–	–		–		5	0
Persela Lamongan	2025–26	8	1	–	–	–		–		8	1
Career total		132	30	7	2	0	0	16	4	155	36

=== International ===
As of 11 June 2021

Indonesia
Year	Apps	Goals
2017	2	0
2018	1	0
2021	3	0
Total	6	0

International under-23 goals

Goal	Date	Venue	Opponent	Score	Result	Competition
1	21 July 2017	National Stadium, Bangkok, Thailand	Mongolia	5–0	7–0	2018 AFC U-23 Championship qualification
2	16 November 2017	Wibawa Mukti Stadium, Bekasi, Indonesia	Syria	2–2	2–3	Friendly Match
3	26 February 2019	Olympic Stadium, Phnom Penh, Cambodia	Thailand	2–1	2–1	2019 AFF U-22 Youth Championship Final
4	26 November 2019	Rizal Memorial Stadium, Manila, Philippines	Thailand	2–0	2–0	2019 Southeast Asian Games
5	28 November 2019	Rizal Memorial Stadium, Manila, Philippines	Singapore	1–0	2–0	2019 Southeast Asian Games
6	3 December 2019	Biñan Football Stadium, Biñan, Philippines	Brunei	1–0	8–0	2019 Southeast Asian Games
7	3 December 2019	Biñan Football Stadium, Biñan, Philippines	Brunei	3–0	8–0	2019 Southeast Asian Games
8	3 December 2019	Biñan Football Stadium, Biñan, Philippines	Brunei	6–0	8–0	2019 Southeast Asian Games
9	5 December 2019	City of Imus Grandstand, Imus, Philippines	Laos	2–0	4–0	2019 Southeast Asian Games
10	5 December 2019	City of Imus Grandstand, Imus, Philippines	Laos	4–0	4–0	2019 Southeast Asian Games
11	7 December 2019	Rizal Memorial Stadium, Manila, Philippines	Myanmar	3–2	4–2 (a.e.t.)	2019 Southeast Asian Games

== Honours ==
=== Club ===
Persipura Jayapura

- Indonesia Soccer Championship A: 2016

Persebaya Surabaya

- Indonesia President's Cup runner-up: 2019

Persija Jakarta

- Menpora Cup: 2021

=== International ===
Indonesia U-23

- SEA Games silver medal: 2019; bronze medal: 2017
- AFF U-22 Youth Championship: 2019

=== Individual ===
- Liga 1 Best Young Player: 2018
- Liga 1 Best XI: 2018
- Menpora Cup Best Eleven: 2021
- Southeast Asian Games Top scorer: 2019
