= Nguyen Van Toan =

Nguyen Van Toan may refer to:

- Nguyễn Văn Toàn (general) (1932-2005), Vietnamese lieutenant general
- Nguyễn Văn Toàn (footballer, born 1996), Vietnamese football winger for Thép Xanh Nam Định
- Nguyễn Văn Toản (footballer, born 1999), Vietnamese football goalkeeper for Hải Phòng
