= Football at the 2019 SEA Games – Men's tournament =

2019 SEA Games Men's Football Tournament
Tournament details
- Host country: Philippines
- Dates: November 25 – December 10
- Teams: 11 (from 11 associations)
- Venue: 3 (in 3 host cities)

Final positions
- Champions: Vietnam (2nd title)
- Runners-up: Indonesia
- Third place: Myanmar
- Fourth place: Cambodia

Tournament statistics
- Matches played: 29
- Goals scored: 111 (3.83 per match)
- Attendance: 52,039 (1,794 per match)
- Top scorer(s): (Indonesia) Osvaldo Haay (Vietnam) Hà Đức Chinh (8 goals each)

The men's football tournament at the 2019 SEA Games was held from November 25 to December 10, 2019 in the Philippines. All eleven Southeast Asian nations participated in the men's tournament. Matches were played in Manila, Biñan and Imus. Men's teams were restricted to under-22 players (born on or after January 1, 1997).

Thailand were the defending champions but were eliminated in the group stage. Vietnam won their first title as unified country, having won the gold medal in 1959 previously as South Vietnam.

== Competition schedule ==
The following was the competition schedule for the men's football competitions:

G	Group stage	½	Semifinals	B	Bronze medal match	F	Gold medal match

Mon 25	Tue 26	Wed 27	Thu 28	Fri 29	Sat 30	Sun 1	Mon 2	Tue 3	Wed 4	Thu 5	Fri 6	Sat 7	Sun 8	Mon 9	Tue 10	
G	G	G	G	G		G	G	G	G	G		½			B	F

== Venues ==
The matches were played across three venues. The renovated Rizal Memorial Stadium in Manila was the primary venue, while some matches in the group stage were held at the Biñan Football Stadium in Biñan, Laguna and the City of Imus Grandstand in Imus, Cavite.

Manila	Biñan	Imus	Football at the 2019 SEA Games – Men's tournament (Luzon)
Rizal Memorial Stadium	Biñan Football Stadium	City of Imus Grandstand	Football at the 2019 SEA Games – Men's tournament (Luzon)
Capacity: 12,873	Capacity: 3,000	Capacity: 4,800	Football at the 2019 SEA Games – Men's tournament (Luzon)

== Squads ==
The men's tournament was an under-22 international tournament (born on or after January 1, 1997), with a maximum of two overage players allowed. Each participating nation's squad were composed of maximum of 20 players.

== Summary ==
The men's tournament began with Malaysia meeting Myanmar. Soe Moe Kyaw's goal opened the scoring, later Hadi from Malaysia equalized. From there, the match would end as a draw, temporarily putting both teams on the top of the table. Also, Vietnam defeated Brunei 6–0 to start their campaign on a high, while Philippines held Cambodia to a shock draw, title holders Thailand suffered a shock defeat against Indonesia. Both Laos and Singapore were held by a goalless draw. Vietnam scored another six goals, but conceded one against Laos, with a dominant 6–1 victory. Myanmar edged past hosts Philippines thanks to a late goal by Win Naing Tun. Brunei also lost 7–0 to Thailand, conceding 13 in 2 games. Cambodia would ease past Timor-Leste, while Indonesia defeated Singapore 2–0. Goals from Aung Kaung Mann, Htet Phyo Wai and Hlaing Bo Bo, Myanmar earned a 3–1 win, with 7 points in three games. While Thailand and Laos earned wins over Singapore and Brunei respectively, Philippines defeated Malaysia 1–0, which was considered a shock, while Vietnam earned a late goal from Nguyễn Hoàng Đức put them on the top of the table. While Malaysia got their first win, the first team qualified to the knockout stage was Myanmar. A very late 86 minute goal by Aung Kaung Mann put him on 3 goals in 4 games. Thailand scored two late goals against Laos to potentially eliminate them, while Indonesia battered Brunei 8–0. Vietnam would get lucky with a late goal yet again, while Hà Đức Chinh scored a late winner against Singapore, putting them in the next round. The loss for Singapore meant that they were yet to score a goal. Cambodia earned a shock win against Malaysia, who earned only 4 points. Philippines defeated Timor-Leste, but nonetheless, they went out on goal difference. Singapore would get their first goals, all coming against Brunei. Indonesia would also beat Laos 4–0, while Vietnam were held by Thailand with two early goals by Supachai Chaided and Suphanat Mueanta. Myanmar, Indonesia, Vietnam and Cambodia earned spots in the semi-finals, while holders Thailand and runners-up of 2017 tournament Malaysia were eliminated early. Hosts Philippines showed signs of impressiveness, only failing to go past Cambodia by goal difference.

The first semi-final saw Indonesia win 4-2 after extra time against Myanmar, with Evan Dimas scoring a brace. Despite this, the bronze medal was still likely to be in Myanmar's hands. Hà Đức Chinh scored a hat-trick against Cambodia, while Nguyễn Tiến Linh scored one to earn Vietnam a final spot against Indonesia.

In the bronze medal match, Sieng Chanthea scored a shock early goal. But eight minutes later, Aung Kaung Mann scored his fifth goal of the tournament. Myat Kaung Khant scored in the 35th minute, but Keo Sokpheng scored in the 71st minute. The match went goalless for the final parts of regular time, and extra time. All of Myanmar's 5 penalty takers scored, while Keo Sokpheng's penalty hit the post, Myanmar won bronze, their first medal since 2015, when they failed to beat Thailand in the final. In the gold medal match, midfielder Đỗ Hùng Dũng scored a goal while 20-year old Đoàn Văn Hậu scored a brace, giving Vietnam their first gold medal as a unified country. They managed to retain their status as a gold medallist and won the 2021 tournament.

== Draw ==
The draw was held on October 15, 2019 at Sofitel Hotel in Manila, Philippines. The 11 teams in the men's tournament were drawn into two groups of five and six teams. Four pots will be used for the draw with teams seeded according to their previous performance in the 2017 Southeast Asian Games. Defending champions Thailand and hosts Philippines are seeded in Pot 1.

The Vietnam Football Federation filed a complaint regarding the seeding of the Vietnam national team in Pot 4 for the men's football tournament questioning the fact that their national team, who collected ten points in the group stage of the 2017 edition of the games, was seeded lower than the two teams who collected less points and were seeded Pot 3 (Myanmar with nine points and Singapore with six points). Vietnam was later elevated to Pot 3 and Singapore was relegated to Pot 4.

Pot 1	Pot 2	Pot 3	Pot 4
Philippines (H); Thailand (C)	Malaysia; Indonesia	Myanmar; Vietnam	Singapore; Laos; Cambodia; Brunei; Timor-Leste

== Officials ==
Referees

- Ismaeel Habib Ali (Bahrain)
- Chen Hsin-chuan (Chinese Taipei)
- C. R. Srikrishna (India)
- Yousif Hassan (Iraq)
- Ammar Ashkanani (Kuwait)
- Khash-Erdene Bold (Mongolia)
- Khaled Al-Shaqsi (Oman)
- Clifford Daypuyat (Philippines)
- Linjun Talaver (Philippines)
- Steve Supresencia (Philippines)
- Salman Falahi (Qatar)
- Majed Al-Shamrani (Saudi Arabia)
- Feras Taweel (Syria)

Assistant Referees

- Sayed Al-Alawi (Bahrain)
- Chen Hsiao-en (Chinese Taipei)
- So Kai Man (Hong Kong)
- Sumanta Dutta (India)
- Abdulhadi Alanezi (Kuwait)
- Nasser Ambusaidi (Oman)
- Francis Engalgado (Philippines)
- Kent Gobuyan (Philippines)
- Giovanni Lachica (Philippines)
- Krizmark Nañola (Philippines)
- Zahy Al-Shammari (Qatar)
- Yassir Al-Sultan (Saudi Arabia)
- Rami Taan (Syria)

== Group stage ==
- All times are Philippine Standard Time (UTC+8).

=== Group A ===
Pos	Team	Pld	W	D	L	GF	GA	GD	Pts	Qualification
1	Myanmar	4	3	1	0	8	4	+4	10	Semi-finals
2	Cambodia	4	2	1	1	10	4	+6	7	Semi-finals
3	Philippines (H)	4	2	1	1	9	4	+5	7	
4	Malaysia	4	1	1	2	6	5	+1	4	
5	Timor-Leste	4	0	0	4	2	18	−16	0	

Source: 2019 SEAG (archived)
Rules for classification: 1) Points; 2) Goal difference; 3) Goals scored
(H) Hosts
November 25, 2019
16:00

Malaysia	1–1	Myanmar
Hadi 24'	Report	Soe Moe Kyaw 13'

Rizal Memorial Stadium, Manila
Referee: Chen Hsin-chuan (Chinese Taipei)
November 25, 2019
20:00

Philippines	1–1	Cambodia
Chung 90+4'	Report	Sokpheng 41'

Rizal Memorial Stadium, Manila
Attendance: 2,980
Referee: C. R. Srikrishna (India)

November 27, 2019
16:00

Myanmar	2–1	Philippines
Aung Kaung Mann 17'; Win Naing Tun 79'	Report	Baas 45+1'

Rizal Memorial Stadium, Manila
Attendance: 3,000
Referee: Feras Taweel (Syria)
November 27, 2019
20:00

Cambodia	5–0	Timor-Leste
Kakada 8'; Bunheing 70', 90+2'; Chanthea 78'; Sokpheng 82'	Report

Rizal Memorial Stadium, Manila
Attendance: 1,600
Referee: Yousif Hassan (Iraq)

November 29, 2019
16:00

Timor-Leste	1–3	Myanmar
Mesquita 40'	Report	Aung Kaung Mann 10'; Htet Phyo Wai 36'; Hlaing Bo Bo 54'

Rizal Memorial Stadium, Manila
Attendance: 500
Referee: Khash-Erdene Bold (Mongolia)
November 29, 2019
20:00

Philippines	1–0	Malaysia
Schröck 74'	Report

Rizal Memorial Stadium, Manila
Attendance: 6,500
Referee: Salman Falahi (Qatar)

December 2, 2019
20:00

Malaysia	4–0	Timor-Leste
Filomeno 6' (o.g.); Hadi 34', 43'; Akhyar 81'	Report

Rizal Memorial Stadium, Manila
Attendance: 419
Referee: Khaled Al-Shaqsi (Oman)
December 2, 2019
20:00

Myanmar	2–1	Cambodia
Lwin Moe Aung 27'; Aung Kaung Mann 86'	Report	Sophanat 21'

Biñan Football Stadium, Biñan
Attendance: 387
Referee: Ismaeel Habib Ali (Bahrain)

December 4, 2019
16:00

Cambodia	3–1	Malaysia
Sodavid 56'; Chanthea 57'; Sokpheng 68'	Report	Quentin 89'

Rizal Memorial Stadium, Manila
Attendance: 240
Referee: C. R. Srikrishna (India)
December 4, 2019
16:00

Timor-Leste	1–6	Philippines
Reis 90+3'	Report	Schröck 4'; Aguinaldo 42', 85', 90'; Diano 54'; De Bruycker 75'

Biñan Football Stadium, Biñan
Attendance: 3,300
Referee: Khash-Erdene Bold (Mongolia)

=== Group B ===
Pos	Team	Pld	W	D	L	GF	GA	GD	Pts	Qualification
1	Vietnam	5	4	1	0	17	4	+13	13	Semi-finals
2	Indonesia	5	4	0	1	17	2	+15	12	Semi-finals
3	Thailand	5	3	1	1	14	4	+10	10	
4	Singapore	5	1	1	3	7	6	+1	4	
5	Laos	5	1	1	3	4	12	−8	4	
6	Brunei	5	0	0	5	0	31	−31	0	

Source: 2019 SEAG (archived)
Rules for classification: 1) Points; 2) Goal difference; 3) Goals scored
November 25, 2019
16:00

Vietnam	6–0	Brunei
Hà Đức Chinh 10', 23', 48', 66'; Triệu Việt Hưng 59'; Nguyễn Trọng Hùng 83'	Report

Biñan Football Stadium, Biñan (Note: Venue was changed to the Biñan Football Stadium from Imus Grandstand and Track Oval in Imus.)
Attendance: 550
Referee: Khalid Al-Shaqsi (Oman)

November 26, 2019
16:00

Thailand	0–2	Indonesia
	Report	Egy 4'; Osvaldo 87'

Rizal Memorial Stadium, Manila
Attendance: 520
Referee: Ismaeel Habib Ali (Bahrain)
November 26, 2019
20:00

Laos	0–0	Singapore
	Report

Rizal Memorial Stadium, Manila
Attendance: 200
Referee: Salman Falahi (Qatar)

November 28, 2019
16:00

Vietnam	6–1	Laos
Nguyễn Tiến Linh 3', 17', 57'; Đỗ Hùng Dũng 54'; Nguyễn Trọng Hoàng 83'; Nguyễn Quang Hải 90+3'	Report	Phetsivilay 60'

Biñan Football Stadium, Biñan
Referee: C. R. Srikrishna (India)
November 28, 2019
16:00

Brunei	0–7	Thailand
	Report	Supachai 43'; Jaroensak 44'; Anon 53', 87'; Sarayut 72'; Suphanat 74'; Supachok 89'

Rizal Memorial Stadium, Manila
Attendance: 140
Referee: Ammar Ashkanani (Kuwait)
November 28, 2019
20:00

Indonesia	2–0	Singapore
Osvaldo 64'; Asnawi 74'	Report

Rizal Memorial Stadium, Manila
Attendance: 840
Referee: Majed Al-Shamrani (Saudi Arabia)

December 1, 2019
16:00

Thailand	3–0	Singapore
Jaroensak 8'; Suphanat 19'; Peerawat 36'	Report

Biñan Football Stadium, Biñan
Attendance: 770
Referee: Chen Hsin-chuan (Chinese Taipei)
December 1, 2019
16:00

Laos	3–0	Brunei
Vongchiengkham 18'; Bounkong 52', 67'	Report

Rizal Memorial Stadium, Manila
Attendance: 458
Referee: Yousif Hassan (Iraq)
December 1, 2019
20:00

Vietnam	2–1	Indonesia
Nguyễn Thành Chung 64'; Nguyễn Hoàng Đức 90+1'	Report	Sani 23'

Rizal Memorial Stadium, Manila
Attendance: 4,610
Referee: Majed Al-Shamrani (Saudi Arabia)

December 3, 2019
16:00

Laos	0–2	Thailand
	Report	Suphanat 90', 90+4'

Rizal Memorial Stadium, Manila
Attendance: 94
Referee: Feras Taweel (Syria)
December 3, 2019
20:00

Indonesia	8–0	Brunei
Osvaldo 11', 45+2', 72'; Egy 40', 80'; Saddil 50'; Witan 68'; Andy 77'	Report

Biñan Football Stadium, Biñan
Attendance: 132
Referee: Clifford Daypuyat (Philippines)
December 3, 2019
20:00

Singapore	0–1	Vietnam
	Report	Hà Đức Chinh 85'

Rizal Memorial Stadium, Manila
Attendance: 2,508
Referee: Ammar Ashkanani (Kuwait)

December 5, 2019
16:00

Brunei	0–7	Singapore
	Report	Irfan 4'; Ikhsan 68', 90+2', 90+3'; Saifullah 72'; Faris 84', 87'

Rizal Memorial Stadium, Manila
Attendance: 220
Referee: Linjun Talaver (Philippines)
December 5, 2019
16:00

Indonesia	4–0	Laos
Saddil 5'; Osvaldo 47', 90+4'; Bagas 74'	Report

City of Imus Grandstand, Imus
Attendance: 550
Referee: Clifford Daypuyat (Philippines)
December 5, 2019
16:00

Vietnam	2–2	Thailand
Nguyễn Tiến Linh 15', 72' (pen.)	Report	Supachai 5'; Suphanat 10'

Biñan Football Stadium, Biñan
Attendance: 1,500
Referee: Ismaeel Habib Ali (Bahrain)

== Knockout stage ==
Semi-finals
December 7 – Manila
Myanmar	2
Indonesia (a.e.t.)	4
December 7 – Manila
Vietnam	4
Cambodia	0

Gold medal match
December 10 – Manila
Indonesia	0
Vietnam	3
Bronze medal match
December 10 – Manila
Myanmar (p)	2 (5)
Cambodia	2 (4)

=== Semi-finals ===
December 7, 2019
16:00

Myanmar	2–4 (a.e.t.)	Indonesia
Aung Kaung Mann 79'; Win Naing Tun 80'	Report	Evan 57', 113'; Egy 72'; Osvaldo 102'

Rizal Memorial Stadium, Manila
Attendance: 2,899
Referee: C. R. Srikrishna (India)
December 7, 2019
20:00

Vietnam	4–0	Cambodia
Nguyễn Tiến Linh 20'; Hà Đức Chinh 25', 45+2', 69'	Report

Rizal Memorial Stadium, Manila
Attendance: 5,100
Referee: Salman Falahi (Qatar)

=== Bronze medal match ===
December 10, 2019
16:00

Myanmar	2–2	Cambodia
Aung Kaung Mann 9'; Myat Kaung Khant 35'	Report	Chanthea 1'; Sokpheng 71'
Penalties
Htet Phyo Wai (penalty scored); Lwin Moe Aung (penalty scored); Nay Moe Naing (penalty scored); Ye Yint Aung (penalty scored); Win Naing Tun (penalty scored)	5–4	(penalty scored) Sodavid; (penalty scored) Muslim; (penalty scored) Piseth; (penalty scored) Rosib; (penalty missed) Sokpheng

Rizal Memorial Stadium, Manila
Attendance: 512
Referee: Chen Hsin-chuan (Chinese Taipei)

=== Gold medal match ===
December 10, 2019
20:00

Indonesia	0–3	Vietnam
	Report	Đoàn Văn Hậu 39', 73'; Đỗ Hùng Dũng 59'

Rizal Memorial Stadium, Manila
Attendance: 11,500
Referee: Majed Al-Shamrani (Saudi Arabia)

== Winners ==
2019 SEA Games Men's Tournament
(Vietnam)
Vietnam
Second title

== Goalscorers ==
There were 111 goals scored in 29 matches, for an average of 3.83 goals per match.

8 goals

- (Indonesia) Osvaldo Haay
- (Vietnam) Hà Đức Chinh

6 goals

- (Vietnam) Nguyễn Tiến Linh

5 goals

- (Myanmar) Aung Kaung Mann
- (Thailand) Suphanat Mueanta

4 goals

- (Cambodia) Keo Sokpheng
- (Indonesia) Egy Maulana

3 goals

- (Cambodia) Sieng Chanthea
- (Malaysia) Hadi Fayyadh
- (Philippines) Amani Aguinaldo
- (Singapore) Ikhsan Fandi

2 goals

- (Cambodia) Reung Bunheing
- (Indonesia) Evan Dimas
- (Indonesia) Saddil Ramdani
- (Laos) Bounphachan Bounkong
- (Myanmar) Win Naing Tun
- (Philippines) Stephan Schröck
- (Singapore) Faris Ramli
- (Thailand) Anon Amornlerdsak
- (Thailand) Jaroensak Wonggorn
- (Thailand) Supachai Jaided
- (Vietnam) Đoàn Văn Hậu
- (Vietnam) Đỗ Hùng Dũng

1 goal

- (Cambodia) In Sodavid
- (Cambodia) Sin Kakada
- (Cambodia) Sin Sophanat
- (Indonesia) Andy Setyo
- (Indonesia) Asnawi Bahar
- (Indonesia) Bagas Adi Nugroho
- (Indonesia) Sani Rizki
- (Indonesia) Witan Sulaeman
- (Laos) Kaharn Phetsivilay
- (Laos) Soukaphone Vongchiengkham
- (Malaysia) Akhyar Rashid
- (Malaysia) Quentin Cheng
- (Myanmar) Hlaing Bo Bo
- (Myanmar) Htet Phyo Wai
- (Myanmar) Lwin Moe Aung
- (Myanmar) Myat Kaung Khant
- (Myanmar) Soe Moe Kyaw
- (Philippines) Dennis Chung
- (Philippines) Dylan de Bruycker
- (Philippines) Justin Baas
- (Philippines) Mar Diano
- (Singapore) Irfan Fandi
- (Singapore) Saifullah Akbar
- (Thailand) Peerawat Akkatam
- (Thailand) Sarayut Sompim
- (Thailand) Supachok Sarachat
- (Timor-Leste) Elias Mesquita
- (Timor-Leste) Nataniel Reis
- (Vietnam) Nguyễn Hoàng Đức
- (Vietnam) Nguyễn Quang Hải
- (Vietnam) Nguyễn Thành Chung
- (Vietnam) Nguyễn Trọng Hoàng
- (Vietnam) Nguyễn Trọng Hùng
- (Vietnam) Triệu Việt Hưng

1 own goal

- (Timor-Leste) Filomeno Junior (against Malaysia)

== Final ranking ==
Pos	Team	Pld	W	D	L	GF	GA	GD	Pts	Final result
1	Vietnam	7	6	1	0	24	4	+20	19	Gold Medal
2	Indonesia	7	5	0	2	21	7	+14	15	Silver Medal
3	Myanmar	6	3	2	1	12	10	+2	11	Bronze Medal
4	Cambodia	6	2	2	2	12	10	+2	8	Fourth place
5	Thailand	5	3	1	1	17	4	+13	10	Eliminated in group stage
6	Philippines (H)	4	2	1	1	9	4	+5	7	Eliminated in group stage
7	Singapore	5	1	1	3	7	6	+1	4	Eliminated in group stage
8	Malaysia	4	1	1	2	6	5	+1	4	Eliminated in group stage
9	Laos	5	1	1	3	4	12	−8	4	Eliminated in group stage
10	Timor-Leste	4	0	0	4	2	18	−16	0	Eliminated in group stage
11	Brunei	5	0	0	5	0	31	−31	0	Eliminated in group stage

(H) Hosts

== See also ==
- 2019 SEA Games Women's Football tournament
