= Bagas Adi Nugroho =

Indonesian footballer

Bagas Adi
Personal information
- Full name: Bagas Adi Nugroho
- Date of birth: 8 March 1997 (age 29)
- Place of birth: Sleman, Indonesia
- Height: 1.76 m (5 ft 9 in)
- Positions: Centre-back; left-back

Team information
- Current team: Bali United
- Number: 5

Youth career
- 2009–2012: Villa 2000
- 2012–2013: Deportivo Indonesia
- 2013–2014: Sriwijaya
- 2014–2015: Semen Padang

Senior career*
Years	Team	Apps	(Gls)
2015	Persipasi Bandung Raya	1	(0)
2016	PSS Sleman	6	(0)
2017–2019	Arema	21	(0)
2019–2020	Bhayangkara	6	(0)
2020–2024	Arema	83	(0)
2024–	Bali United	23	(0)

International career
2011	Indonesia U16	12	(1)
2013–2016	Indonesia U19	24	(1)
2017–2019	Indonesia U23	29	(1)
2017	Indonesia	4	(0)
Medal record
Men's football
Representing Indonesia
AFF U-22 Youth Championship
Winner	2019 Cambodia	Team
Southeast Asian Games
Silver medal – second place	2019 Philippines	Team
- * Club domestic league appearances and goals as of 17 May 2026

Bagas Adi Nugroho (born 8 March 1997) is an Indonesian professional footballer who plays as a defender for Super League club Bali United.

== Club career ==
=== Persipasi Bandung Raya ===
On 2015, Bagas joined in the Persipasi Bandung Raya squad for 2015 Jenderal Sudirman Cup.

=== PSS Sleman ===
Bagas joined PSS Sleman in the round of 16 2016 Indonesia Soccer Championship B. Bagas made his debut for PSS on 16 October 2016 in a 1–0 win against Persita Tangerang. During his time for PSS Sleman, he played well with PSS Sleman for 3 months and managed to bring PSS as runner up in the 2016 ISC B tournament.

=== Arema ===
After from PSS Sleman, Bagas joined Arema along with Hanif Sjahbandi on 23 January 2017. And he immediately brought his new club to the champions 2017 Indonesia President's Cup. Bagas made his league debut on 15 April 2017 in a match against Persib Bandung in the Liga 1.

In January 2019, Arema's general manager Ruddy Widodo revealed that Bagas would be leaving the club, Bagas will definitely not join Arema FC in 2019 Liga 1.

=== Bhayangkara ===
He was signed for Bhayangkara to play in Liga 1 in the 2019 season. Bagas made his debut on 31 August 2019 in a match against Persebaya Surabaya. Bagas finished the season with only 6 appearances.

=== Return to Arema ===
On 2020, it was confirmed that Bagas Adi would re-join Arema, signing a year contract. He made his debut on 2 March 2020 in a match against TIRA-Persikabo. This season was suspended on 27 March 2020 due to the COVID-19 pandemic. The season was abandoned and was declared void on 20 January 2021.

On 5 September 2021, he started his match in the 2021–22 Liga 1 season for Arema after last season's league was suspended due to the covid pandemic, playing as a starter and played the full 90 minutes in a 1–1 draw over PSM Makassar. In a match against his former club Bhayangkara saw Bagas began playing in the centre–back position, where he continued to form a partnership with Sérgio Silva.

Bagas started in every match since the start of the season until he suffered a knee injury during a 1–1 draw against Persija Jakarta on 5 February 2022. On 15 February, Bagas returned to the starting lineup from injury, starting the whole game, in a 2–0 won against Persita Tangerang. He picked up his first red card for the club in a Super East Java derby league match against Persebaya Surabaya on 23 February. Despite this, Bagas returned to the first team and played the full 90 minutes for the side on 20 March, where he give one assist in a 2–2 draw over Borneo Samarinda. At the end of the 2021–22 season, Bagas went on to make 31 appearances in all competitions.

== International career ==
He made his international debut for senior team on 21 March 2017, against Myanmar.

== Career statistics ==
=== Club ===
As of match played 17 May 2026

Club	Season	League			Cup (Note: Includes Piala Indonesia)		Continental		Other (Note: Appearances in Piala Presiden)		Total	
Club	Season	Division	Apps	Goals	Apps	Goals	Apps	Goals	Apps	Goals	Apps	Goals
PSS Sleman	2016	ISC B	6	0	0	0	—		0	0	6	0
Arema	2017	Liga 1	9	0	0	0	—		6	0	15	0
Arema	2018	Liga 1	12	0	1	0	—		1	0	14	0
Arema	Total		21	0	1	0	—		7	0	29	0
Bhayangkara	2019	Liga 1	6	0	1	0	—		0	0	7	0
Arema	2020	Liga 1	2	0	0	0	—		0	0	2	0
Arema	2021–22	Liga 1	28	0	0	0	—		3 (Note: Appearances in Menpora Cup)	0	31	0
Arema	2022–23	Liga 1	28	0	0	0	—		7	0	35	0
Arema	2023–24	Liga 1	25	0	0	0	—		0	0	25	0
Arema	Total		83	0	0	0	—		10	0	93	0
Bali United	2024–25	Liga 1	7	0	0	0	—		0	0	7	0
Bali United	2025–26	Super League	16	0	0	0	—		0	0	16	0
Career total			139	0	2	0	0	0	17	0	158	0

=== International ===
As of match played 25 November 2017

Appearances and goals by national team and year
National team	Year	Apps	Goals
Indonesia	2017	4	0
Total		4	0

=== International under-19 goals ===
#	Date	Venue	Opponent	Score	Result	Competition
1.	16 September 2016	Vietnam Youth Training Centre, Hanoi, Vietnam	Australia	1–1	1–3	2016 AFF U-19 Youth Championship

=== International under-23 goals ===
#	Date	Venue	Opponent	Score	Result	Competition
1.	5 December 2019	City of Imus Grandstand, Imus, Philippines	Laos	3–0	4–0	2019 Southeast Asian Games

== Honours ==
Sriwijaya U-21

- Indonesia Super League U-21: 2012–13

Arema

- Piala Presiden: 2017, 2022

Indonesia U-23

- AFF U-22 Youth Championship: 2019
- SEA Games silver medal: 2019

Indonesia

- Aceh World Solidarity Cup runner-up: 2017
