= Andy Setyo =

Indonesian footballer

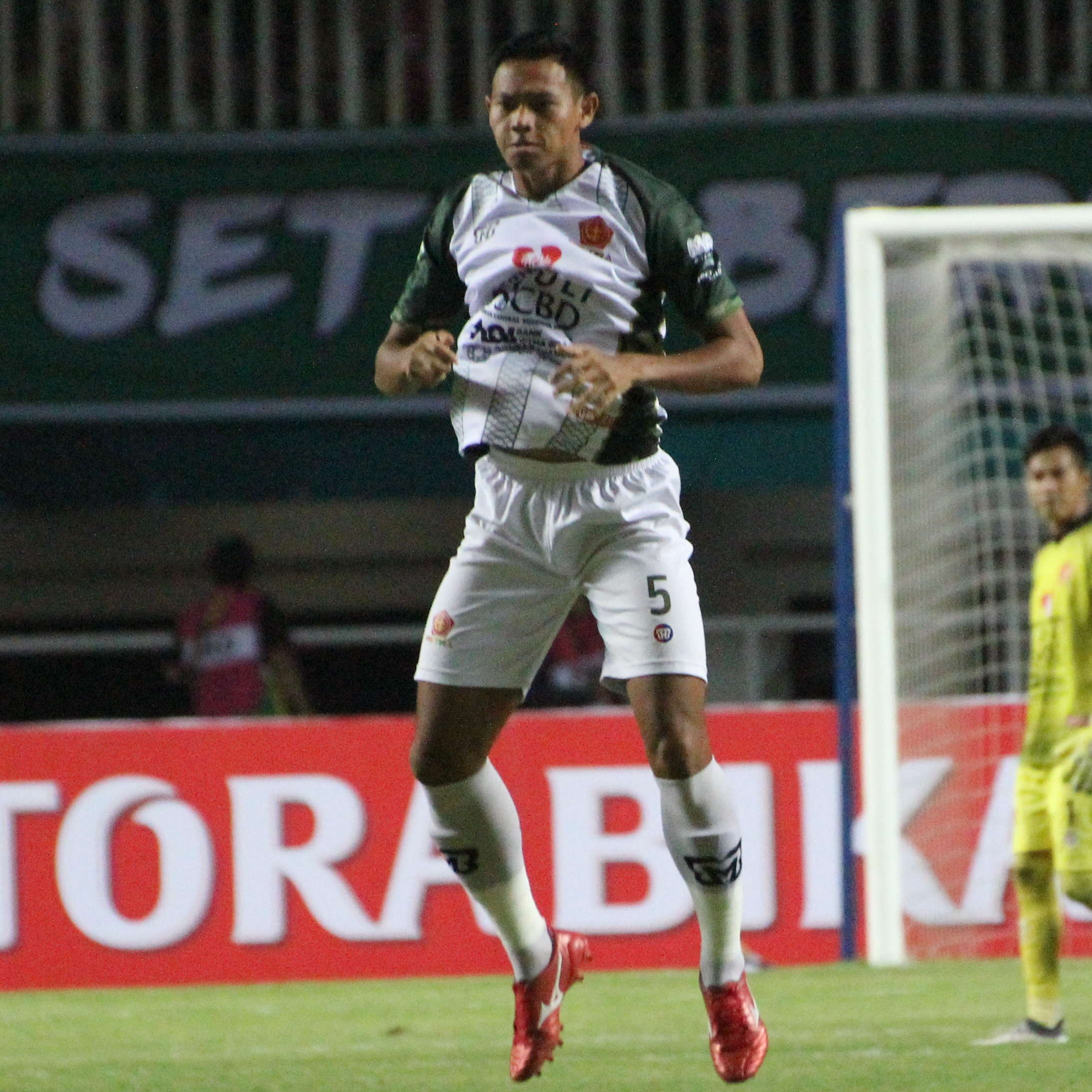
- Setyo playing for PS TIRA in 2018

Personal information
- Full name: Andy Setyo Nugroho
- Date of birth: 16 September 1997 (age 29)
- Place of birth: Pati, Indonesia
- Height: 1.80 m (5 ft 11 in)
- Position: Centre-back

Team information
- Current team: PSIS Semarang
- Number: 97

Youth career
- 2015: Borneo
- 2016: PS TNI

Senior career*
Years	Team	Apps	(Gls)
2016–2024	Persikabo 1973	126	(7)
2024–2025	Bhayangkara	17	(0)
2025–2026	PSIM Yogyakarta	7	(0)
2026–	PSIS Semarang	5	(0)

International career
2014–2016	Indonesia U19	2	(0)
2017–2023	Indonesia U23 (Note: Appearances as an overage player (three appearances in Asian Games))	24	(1)
2017–2023	Indonesia	3	(0)
Medal record
Men's football
Representing Indonesia
Southeast Asian Games
Bronze medal – third place	2017 Kuala Lumpur	Team
Silver medal – second place	2019 Philippines	Team
AFF U-22 Youth Championship
Winner	2019 Cambodia	Team
- * Club domestic league appearances and goals as of 21 November 2026

Andy Setyo Nugroho (born 16 September 1997) is an Indonesian professional footballer who plays as a centre-back for Championship club PSIS Semarang. He is also a first sergeant in the Indonesian Army.

== Club career ==
Andy Setyo was born in Pati, Central Java Province. He entered the Indonesian army before he played professional football. He trained with the military-owned team PS TNI before the team decided to participate in top-flight football in the 2016 Indonesia Soccer Championship A. He stayed with the club when it competed in the 2017 Liga 1 and 2018 Liga 1 seasons. He has remained a loyal part of the team throughout its dynamic journey that included name changes and a 2019 merger with Liga 3 club Persikabo Bogor. The merger led to a name change to TIRA-Persikabo and base relocation to Bogor Regency in West Java province. Since 2020, the team has been known as Persikabo 1973 to dilute the military association.

On 28 June 2025, he officially signed with Liga 1 club PSIM Yogyakarta.

== International career ==
He made his international debut for the Indonesia U23 team on 22 August 2017 in the 2017 Southeast Asian Games, against Vietnam U23. He captained the U23 team that won silver in the 2019 Southeast Asian Games in the Philippines.

He made his official debut for senior team on 25 November 2017 in a friendly match against Guyana, where he came as a substitute.

In November 2022, it was reported that Andy received a call-up from the Indonesia for a training camp, in preparation for the 2022 AFF Championship.

On 28 August 2023, Andy received a call-up to the national team for a friendly match against Turkmenistan. After last played for the senior team in almost 6 years, Andy played in the match as a substitute in a 2–0 win.

On 14 September 2023, Andy was named by Indra Sjafri for the U23 team as the only overage player in the squad, for the upcoming 2022 Asian Games.

== Career statistics ==
=== Club ===
As of match played 21 November 2026

Club	Season	League		Cup		Continental		Other (Note: Appearances in Indonesia President's Cup)		Total	
Club	Season	Apps	Goals	Apps	Goals	Apps	Goals	Apps	Goals	Apps	Goals
PS TNI	2017	15	0	0	0	–		3	0	18	0
PS TIRA	2018	12	1	0	0	–		2	0	14	1
TIRA–Persikabo	2019	22	2	0	0	–		0	0	22	2
TIRA–Persikabo	2020	2	0	0	0	–		0	0	2	0
Persikabo 1973	2021–22	29	2	0	0	–		3 (Note: Appearances in Menpora Cup)	1	32	3
Persikabo 1973	2022–23	25	1	0	0	–		3	0	28	1
Persikabo 1973	2023–24	21	1	0	0	–		0	0	21	1
Persikabo 1973	Total	126	7	0	0	0	0	11	1	137	8
Bhayangkara	2024–25	17	0	0	0	–		0	0	17	0
PSIM Yogyakarta	2025–26	7	0	0	0	–		0	0	7	0
PSIS Semarang	2026–27	5	0	0	0	–		0	0	5	0
Career total		155	7	0	0	0	0	11	1	166	8

=== International ===
As of 8 September 2023

Indonesia national team
Year	Apps	Goals
2017	1	0
2021	1	0
2023	1	0
Total	3	0

International under-23 goals

Goal	Date	Venue	Opponent	Score	Result	Competition
1	3 December 2019	Biñan Football Stadium, Biñan, Philippines	Brunei	7–0	8–0	2019 SEA Games

== Honours ==
PS TNI U-21

- Indonesia Soccer Championship U-21: 2016

Bhayangkara

- Liga 2 runner-up: 2024–25

Indonesia U-23

- SEA Games silver medal: 2019; bronze medal: 2017
- AFF U-22 Youth Championship: 2019

Indonesia

- Aceh World Solidarity Cup runner-up: 2017
