= Irkham Mila =

Indonesian association football player

Personal information
- Full name: Irkham Zahrul Mila
- Date of birth: 2 May 1998 (age 28)
- Place of birth: Tegal, Indonesia
- Height: 1.68 m (5 ft 6 in)
- Position: Winger

Team information
- Current team: Adhyaksa Bekasi
- Number: 26

Youth career
- SSB Binatama
- 2015: Persekat Tegal

Senior career*
| Years | Team | Apps | (Gls) |
| 2016 | Persip Pekalongan | 11 | (4) |
| 2017 | Persibas Banyumas | 7 | (2) |
| 2017 | Persis Solo | 11 | (5) |
| 2018–2024 | PSS Sleman | 110 | (12) |
| 2024–2025 | Semen Padang | 16 | (1) |
| 2025–2026 | Persik Kediri | 10 | (1) |
| 2026– | Adhyaksa Bekasi | 2 | (0) |

International career
| 2019 | Indonesia U23 | 6 | (2) |
Medal record
Men's football
Representing Indonesia
Southeast Asian Games
| Silver medal – second place | 2019 Philippines | Team |
- * Club domestic league appearances and goals as of 18 September 2026

Irkham Zahrul Mila (born 2 May 1998) is an Indonesian professional footballer who plays as a winger for Championship club Adhyaksa Bekasi.

== Club career ==
=== PSS Sleman ===
Mila explored footballing opportunities in the lower leagues before he joined PSS Sleman in 2018, when the club was striving to return to top-flight football after a decade in tier-two. He was part of the PSS team that won the 2018 Liga 2 and earned promotion to Liga 1 (Indonesia). His performance in PSS led to calls to the Indonesia U-23 team that eventually won silver in the 2019 Southeast Asian Games.

On 5 September 2021, Mila scored his first goal of the 2021–22 season, scoring in a 1–1 draw over Persija Jakarta in the 2021–22 Liga 1.

== Honours ==
=== Club ===
PSS Sleman

- Liga 2: 2018
- Menpora Cup third place: 2021

=== International ===
Indonesia U23

- SEA Games silver medal: 2019
