= Firza Andika =

Indonesian footballer (born 1999)

Personal information
- Full name: Firza Andika
- Date of birth: 11 May 1999 (age 27)
- Place of birth: Medan, Indonesia
- Height: 1.67 m (5 ft 6 in)
- Positions: Left-back; midfielder

Team information
- Current team: Bhayangkara Presisi
- Number: 11

Youth career
- 2008–2015: Tasbi Soccer School
- 2015–2017: Semen Padang

Senior career*
Years	Team	Apps	(Gls)
2018–2019	PSMS Medan	9	(0)
2019–2020	Tubize	0	(0)
2019	→ PSM Makassar (loan)	3	(0)
2020	→ PSM Makassar (loan)	0	(0)
2021–2022	Persikabo 1973	28	(1)
2022–2025	Persija Jakarta	88	(4)
2025–	Bhayangkara Presisi	13	(0)

International career
2017–2018	Indonesia U19	14	(3)
2019–2022	Indonesia U23	19	(0)
2021	Indonesia	1	(0)
Medal record
Men's football
Representing Indonesia
AFF U-19 Youth Championship
Third place	2017 Myanmar
Third place	2018 Indonesia	Team
AFF U-22 Youth Championship
Winner	2019 Cambodia	Team
Southeast Asian Games
Silver medal – second place	2019 Philippines	Team
Bronze medal – third place	2021 Vietnam	Team
- * Club domestic league appearances and goals as of 5 January 2026

Firza Andika (born 11 May 1999) is an Indonesian professional footballer who plays as a left-back and midfielder for Super League club Bhayangkara Presisi.

== Early career ==
Firza started his football training at the age of nine at the Tasbi soccer school in his hometown of Medan in North Sumatra province. Before he graduated from high school, he moved to West Sumatra province to train at Semen Padang F.C.'s academy when the club was still playing in the top-tier of Indonesian football. He received his first call to the Indonesia national under-19 football team selection while he was here.

== Club career ==
=== PSMS Medan ===
Firza chose to return to his hometown upon his entry to professional football and joined Liga 1 club PSMS Medan in January 2018.

He made his first-team debut for PSMS Medan when he was part of the starting lineup of a 2018 Liga 1 match against Persija Jakarta on 6 April 2018, in which PSMS won. However, he failed to help prevent his club from being relegated to Liga 2 at the end of the 2018 Liga 1 season.

=== AFC Tubize ===
In November 2018, Firza flew to Europe to trial with Belgian lower-league club AFC Tubize and Spanish Tercera Division club UD Alzira. In January 2019, Firza Andika signed a two-year contract for AFC Tubize with the condition he would join in March 2019 after the 2019 AFF U-22 Youth Championship. However, upon his return he was embroiled in a salary dispute there and failed to play a single game for the club. As a solution, he was loaned to Liga 1 PSM Makassar for the remainder of the 2019 Liga 1 season.

==== PSM Makassar (loan) ====
Firza extended his stay at PSM Makassar on loan for the 2020 Liga 1 season.

Firza made his debut on 1 September 2019 as a substitute in a match against Persela Lamongan. Despite the competition being canceled after three matchdays due to the COVID-19 pandemic, he did not return to Tubize.

=== Persikabo 1973 ===
At the end of his problematic contract with Tubize, Firza in early 2021 joined Liga 1 club Persikabo 1973, which is supported by the Indonesian military. At the same time, Firza enrolled himself into the Indonesian Air Force. Firza made his debut on 3 September 2021 as a substitute in a match against Madura United. On 17 October, Firza scored his first goal for Persikabo in a 3–0 victory over Borneo Samarinda at the Sultan Agung Stadium. He made 28 appearances, scoring one goal and making three assists while with Persikabo for one season in 1973.

=== Persija Jakarta ===
Firza was signed for Persija Jakarta to play in Liga 1 in the 2021–22 season. He made his league debut on 23 July 2022 in a match against Bali United at the Kapten I Wayan Dipta Stadium, Gianyar. On 6 December, Firza scored his first goal for Persija in a 1–0 victory over Borneo Samarinda at the Sultan Agung Stadium.

=== Bhayangkara Presisi ===
On 17 June 2025, Firza officially signed Bhayangkara Presisi.

== International career ==
On 31 May 2017, Firza debuted for the Indonesia U-19 team in a match against Brazil U20 in the 2017 Toulon Tournament in France. Firza was also one of the players who strengthened the Indonesia U19 team in the 2018 AFC U-19 Championship. He was part of the Indonesia team that won silver in the 2019 Southeast Asian Games in the Philippines.

Firza received his first call up to the senior Indonesia national football team in May 2021. He earned his first senior cap in a 25 May 2021 friendly match in Dubai against Afghanistan.

== Career statistics ==
=== Club ===
As of match played 5 January 2026

Club	Season	League			Cup		Continental		Other		Total	
Club	Season	Division	Apps	Goals	Apps	Goals	Apps	Goals	Apps	Goals	Apps	Goals
PSMS Medan	2018	Liga 1	9	0	0	0	—		0	0	9	0
Tubize	2018–19	Belgian First Division B	0	0	0	0	—		0	0	0	0
PSM Makassar (loan)	2019	Liga 1	3	0	0	0	—		0	0	3	0
PSM Makassar (loan)	2020	Liga 1	0	0	0	0	—		0	0	0	0
PSM Makassar (loan)	Total		3	0	0	0	—		0	0	3	0
Persikabo 1973	2021–22	Liga 1	28	1	0	0	—		3 (Note: Appearances in Menpora Cup)	1	31	2
Persija Jakarta	2022–23	Liga 1	32	1	0	0	—		2 (Note: Appearances in Indonesia President's Cup)	0	34	1
Persija Jakarta	2023–24	Liga 1	29	2	0	0	—		0	0	29	2
Persija Jakarta	2024–25	Liga 1	27	1	0	0	—		4	1	31	2
Persija Jakarta	Total		88	4	0	0	—		6	1	94	5
Bhayangkara Presisi	2025–26	Super League	13	0	0	0	—		0	0	13	0
Career total			141	5	0	0	—		9	1	150	6

=== International ===
As of match played 29 May 2021

Appearances and goals by national team and year
National team	Year	Apps	Goals
Indonesia	2021	1	0
Total		1	0

== Honours ==
=== International ===
Indonesia U-19

- AFF U-19 Youth Championship third place: 2017, 2018

Indonesia U-23

- AFF U-22 Youth Championship: 2019
- SEA Games silver medal: 2019; bronze medal: 2021
