= Muhammad Riyandi =

Indonesian footballer

Personal information
- Full name: Muhammad Riyandi
- Date of birth: 3 January 2000 (age 26)
- Place of birth: Bogor, Indonesia
- Height: 1.85 m (6 ft 1 in)
- Position: Goalkeeper

Team information
- Current team: Dewa United Banten
- Number: 1

Youth career
- 2008–2014: Pelita Jaya
- 2015: Bina Taruna
- 2016: Barito Putera

Senior career*
Years	Team	Apps	(Gls)
2016–2022	Barito Putera	36	(0)
2022–2026	Persis Solo	76	(0)
2026–	Dewa United Banten	0	(0)

International career
2016–2018	Indonesia U19	11	(0)
2019–2021	Indonesia U23	3	(0)
2021	Indonesia	5	(0)
Medal record
Men's football
Representing Indonesia
AFF U-19 Youth Championship
Third place	2017 Myanmar
Third place	2018 Indonesia	Team
Southeast Asian Games
Silver medal – second place	2019 Philippines	Team
AFF U-22 Youth Championship
Winner	2019 Cambodia	Team
AFF Championship
Runner-up	2020 Singapore	Team
- * Club domestic league appearances and goals as of 2 May 2026

Muhammad Riyandi (born 3 January 2000, in Bogor) is an Indonesian professional footballer who plays as a goalkeeper for Super League club Dewa United Banten. He has been described as a sweeper-keeper, due to his excellent ball control and distribution of the ball.

== Club career ==
=== Barito Putera ===
After only training a month in the club's youth team, Riyandi was selected to be part of the Barito Putera squad that played in the 2016 Indonesia Soccer Championship A. At the age of 16, he became the youngest player to play in the highest level of Indonesian football when coach Mundari Karya played him as a starting goalkeeper in a 13 August 2016 match against Persib Bandung, in which he conceded two goals but also managed to thwart a penalty kick attempt. Unfortunately, his performance in four matches in that tournament was insufficient for him to win any playtime in the 2017 Liga 1 season.

Riyandi was Barito's substitute goalkeeper in the 2018 Liga 1 and 2019 Liga 1 seasons, playing 15 games in two years. He earned the starting goalkeeper role in 2020 but only played twice because the 2020 Liga 1 season was canceled after three matches due to the COVID-19 pandemic. He resumed his starter status in the 2021 Menpora Cup, in which he was recognized again for stopping a penalty kick.

=== Persis Solo ===
Riyandi signed for Liga 1 club Persis Solo. He made his league debut on 25 July 2022 in a match against Dewa United at the Moch. Soebroto Stadium, Magelang.

== International career ==
Riyandi debuted in a youth national team when he was the starting goalkeeper of the Indonesia team in the 2017 AFF U-18 Youth Championship, which he had to suddenly leave mid-way in the third match after a serious injury. He also participated in the 2018 AFF U-19 Youth Championship and the 2019 AFF U-22 Youth Championship. He was part of the Indonesia team that won silver in the 2019 Southeast Asian Games in the Philippines. Riyandi received a call to join the senior Indonesia national football team in May 2021. He made his debut for that team in the 2022 FIFA World Cup qualification against United Arab Emirates on 11 June 2021. In November 2021, Indonesian coach, Shin Tae-yong sent Riyandi his first call up to the full national side, for the friendly matches in Turkey against Afghanistan and Myanmar. In November 2022, it was reported that Riyandi received a call-up from the Indonesia for a training camp, in preparation for the 2022 AFF Championship.

== Career statistics ==
=== Club ===
As of match played 2 May 2026

Club	Season	League			Cup		Continental		Other		Total	
Club	Season	Division	Apps	Goals	Apps	Goals	Apps	Goals	Apps	Goals	Apps	Goals
Barito Putera	2016	ISC A	4	0	0	0	—		0	0	4	0
Barito Putera	2017	Liga 1	0	0	0	0	—		0	0	0	0
Barito Putera	2018	Liga 1	6	0	0	0	—		0	0	6	0
Barito Putera	2019	Liga 1	9	0	0	0	—		0	0	9	0
Barito Putera	2020	Liga 1	2	0	0	0	—		0	0	2	0
Barito Putera	2021–22	Liga 1	15	0	0	0	—		3 (Note: Appearances in Menpora Cup)	0	18	0
Barito Putera	Total		36	0	0	0	—		3	0	39	0
Persis Solo	2022–23	Liga 1	14	0	0	0	—		3 (Note: Appearances in Indonesia President's Cup)	0	17	0
Persis Solo	2023–24	Liga 1	13	0	0	0	—		0	0	13	0
Persis Solo	2024–25	Liga 1	26	0	0	0	—		0	0	26	0
Persis Solo	2025–26	Super League	23	0	0	0	—		0	0	23	0
Persis Solo	Total		76	0	0	0	—		3	0	79	0
Career total			112	0	0	0	0	0	6	0	118	0

=== International ===
As of match played 25 November 2021

Appearances and goals by national team and year
National team	Year	Apps	Goals
Indonesia	2021	5	0
Total		5	0

== Honours ==
=== International ===
Indonesia U-19

- AFF U-19 Youth Championship third place: 2017, 2018

Indonesia U-23

- AFF U-22 Youth Championship: 2019
- SEA Games silver medal: 2019

Indonesia

- AFF Championship runner-up: 2020
