= Zulfiandi =

Indonesian footballer (born 1995)

Personal information
- Full name: Zulfiandi
- Date of birth: 17 July 1995 (age 31)
- Place of birth: Bireuën, Indonesia
- Height: 1.79 m (5 ft 10 in)
- Position: Defensive midfielder

Youth career
- SSB Barata

Senior career*
Years	Team	Apps	(Gls)
2013–2014	PSSB Bireun	28	(4)
2015–2017	Bhayangkara	18	(0)
2016	→ Bali United (loan)	0	(0)
2018	Sriwijaya	20	(0)
2019–2023	Madura United	52	(1)

International career
2013–2014	Indonesia U19	19	(0)
2015–2019	Indonesia U23	16	(0)
2018–2019	Indonesia	10	(1)
Medal record
Men's football
Representing Indonesia
AFF U-19 Youth Championship
Winner	2013 Indonesia
Southeast Asian Games
Silver medal – second place	2019 Philippines	Team
- * Club domestic league appearances and goals as of 31 March 2023

Zulfiandi (born 17 July 1995) is an Indonesian former footballer who plays as a defensive midfielder.

== Club career ==
=== Bhayangkara ===
On 11 November 2014, he signed a four-year contract with Persebaya Bhayangkara. He made his debut on 5 April 2015 as starting line-up, which ended 1–0 victory against Mitra Kukar at Gelora Bung Tomo Stadium.

=== Sriwijaya ===
In 2018, Zulfiandi signed a year contract with Liga 1 club Sriwijaya. He made his league debut on 25 March 2018 in a match against Borneo at the Segiri Stadium, Samarinda.

=== Madura United ===
He was signed for Madura United to play in Liga 1. Zulfiandi made his debut on 17 May 2019 in a match against Persela Lamongan. On 23 June 2019, Zulfiandi scored his first goal for Madura United against Persib Bandung in the 89th minute at the Si Jalak Harupat Stadium, Soreang.

== Personal life ==
On 12 September 2023, Zulfiandi announced a temporary break from professional football. He made the announcement directly through his personal Instagram. In his post, he said the reason for temporarily quitting football was to take care of his sick mother.

== International career ==
Zulfiandi made his first international caps for Indonesia in a match against Mauritius in the Friendly Match and Zulfiandi scored his first international goal for Indonesia in a match against Thailand in the 2018 AFF Championship.

== Career statistics ==
=== Club ===
As of match played 31 March 2023

Club	Season	League			Cup (Note: Includes Piala Indonesia)		Continental		Other (Note: Appearances in Indonesia President's Cup)		Total	
Club	Season	Division	Apps	Goals	Apps	Goals	Apps	Goals	Apps	Goals	Apps	Goals
Bhayangkara	2015	Indonesia Super League	2	0	0	0	–		0	0	2	0
Bhayangkara	2016	ISC A	14	0	0	0	–		0	0	14	0
Bhayangkara	2017	Liga 1	2	0	0	0	–		1	0	3	0
Bhayangkara	Total		18	0	0	0	–		1	0	19	0
Sriwijaya	2018	Liga 1	20	0	0	0	–		6	0	26	0
Madura United	2019	Liga 1	24	1	5	0	–		0	0	29	1
Madura United	2020	Liga 1	0	0	0	0	–		0	0	0	0
Madura United	2021–22	Liga 1	7	0	0	0	–		3 (Note: Appearances in Menpora Cup)	0	10	0
Madura United	2022–23	Liga 1	21	0	0	0	–		2	0	23	0
Career total			90	1	5	0	0	0	12	0	107	1

=== International ===
As of match played 10 October 2019

Appearances and goals by national team and year
National team	Year	Apps	Goals
Indonesia	2018	5	1
Indonesia	2019	5	0
Total		10	1

=== International goals ===
Scores and results list Indonesia's goal tally first.

#	Date	Venue	Opponent	Score	Result	Competition
1.	17 November 2018	Rajamangala Stadium, Bangkok, Thailand	Thailand	1–0	2–4	2018 AFF Championship

== Honours ==
=== Club ===
Bhayangkara

- Liga 1: 2017

Sriwijaya

- Indonesia President's Cup 3rd place: 2018
- East Kalimantan Governor Cup: 2018

=== International ===
Indonesia U19

- AFF U-19 Youth Championship: 2013

Indonesia U23

- SEA Games silver medal: 2019
