= Dodi Alekvan Djin =

Indonesian footballer

Alekvan Djin
Personal information
- Full name: Dodi Alekvan Djin
- Date of birth: 31 December 1998 (age 27)
- Place of birth: West Halmahera, Indonesia
- Height: 1.80 m (5 ft 11 in)
- Position: Defender

Team information
- Current team: Persis Solo
- Number: 13

Youth career
- 2016–2017: Persiter Ternate

Senior career*
Years	Team	Apps	(Gls)
2017–2018	Persema Malang		
2018	Persekat Tegal	10	(0)
2018–2020	Persik Kediri	13	(1)
2020–2024	Madura United	73	(0)
2024–2025	Semen Padang	31	(0)
2025	Persela Lamongan	7	(0)
2026–	Persis Solo	17	(0)

International career
2019	Indonesia U23	2	(0)
Medal record
Men's football
Representing Indonesia
Southeast Asian Games
Silver medal – second place	2019 Philippines	Team
- * Club domestic league appearances and goals as of 11 October 2026

Dodi Alekvan Djin (born 31 December 1998) is an Indonesian professional footballer who plays as a defender for Super League club Persis Solo.

== Club career ==
=== Persik Kediri ===
In 2019 Dodi Alekvan Djin joined Persik Kediri in the Liga 2. On 25 November 2019 Persik successfully won the 2019 Liga 2 Final and promoted to Liga 1, after defeated Persita Tangerang 3–2 at the Kapten I Wayan Dipta Stadium, Gianyar.

=== Madura United ===
He was signed for Madura United to play in Liga 1 in the 2020 season. This season was suspended on 27 March 2020 due to the COVID-19 pandemic. The season was abandoned and was declared void on 20 January 2021. Dodi made his debut on 12 September 2021 in a match against PSM Makassar at the Gelora Bung Karno Madya Stadium, Jakarta.

== Career statistics ==
=== Club ===
As of 11 October 2026.

Club	Season	League		Cup		Continental		Other		Total	
Club	Season	Apps	Goals	Apps	Goals	Apps	Goals	Apps	Goals	Apps	Goals
Persekat Tegal	2018	10	0	0	0	0	0	0	0	10	0
Persik Kediri	2019	13	1	0	0	0	0	0	0	13	1
Madura United	2021–22	25	0	0	0	0	0	0	0	25	0
Madura United	2022–23	24	0	0	0	0	0	4 (Note: Appearances in Indonesia President's Cup)	0	28	0
Madura United	2023–24	24	0	0	0	0	0	0	0	24	0
Semen Padang	2024–25	31	0	0	0	0	0	0	0	31	0
Persela Lamongan	2025–26	7	0	0	0	–		0	0	7	0
Persis Solo	2025–26	12	0	0	0	–		0	0	12	0
Persis Solo	2026–27	5	0	0	0	0	0	0	0	5	0
Career total		151	1	0	0	0	0	4	0	155	1

== Honours ==
=== International ===
Indonesia U23

- SEA Games silver medal: 2019
