= Đoàn Văn Hậu =

Vietnamese footballer (born 1999)

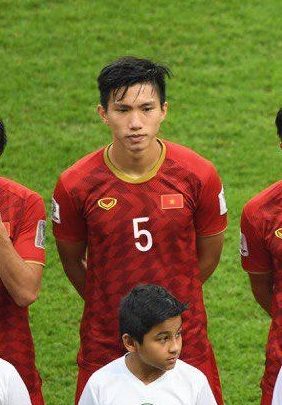
- Văn Hậu with Vietnam at the 2019 AFC Asian Cup

Personal information
- Full name: Đoàn Văn Hậu
- Date of birth: 19 April 1999 (age 27)
- Place of birth: Hưng Hà, Thái Bình, Vietnam
- Height: 1.85 m (6 ft 1 in)
- Positions: Left-back; center back

Team information
- Current team: Công An Hà Nội
- Number: 5

Youth career
- 2010–2017: Hà Nội

Senior career*
Years	Team	Apps	(Gls)
2015–2016	Hà Nội B	17	(2)
2017–2023	Hà Nội	70	(8)
2019–2020	→ Heerenveen (loan)	0	(0)
2023–	Công An Hà Nội	33	(1)

International career^{‡}
2016–2017	Vietnam U19	18	(2)
2017–2019	Vietnam U20	5	(0)
2017–2020	Vietnam U23	30	(5)
2017–	Vietnam	47	(2)
Medal record
Men's football
Representing Vietnam
AFC U-23 Championship
Runner-up	2018 China	Team
AFF Championship
Winner	ASEAN 2018	Team
Runner-up	ASEAN 2022	Team
Winner	ASEAN 2026	Team
Southeast Asian Games
Winner	Philippines 2019	Team
- * Club domestic league appearances and goals as of 7 November 2026 ‡ National team caps and goals as of 26 August 2026

Đoàn Văn Hậu (born 19 April 1999) is a Vietnamese professional footballer who plays as a left-back or center back for V.League 1 club Công An Hà Nội and the Vietnam national team.

== Club career ==
=== Hà Nội ===
Văn Hậu became a regular part of his club Hà Nội in 2017 when he was just 17, making him one of the youngest Vietnamese players to debut in the V.League 1. His performance was considered as one of the most impressive among youngsters in Vietnam. He won the 2018 V.League 1 and 2018 Vietnamese Super Cup with Hà Nội. Văn Hậu was also named in the 2018 V.League 1 Team of The Season.

==== SC Heerenveen (loan) ====
On 2 September 2019, Đoàn Văn Hậu joined Eredivisie side SC Heerenveen on a season-long loan. He made his first-team debut when coming from the bench at 89th minute on 2–0 win over Roda JC in KNVB Cup on 17 December 2019, making him the first Vietnamese player to play in the Netherlands. However, that was his only game for the first team. He was mostly used in the reserve team Jong SC Heerenveen in Beloften Eredivisie, making 10 appearances overall and got one assist before this reserve league was eventually cancelled due to COVID-19 pandemic.

In August 2020, Văn Hậu returned to Hà Nội from a year spell with SC Heerenveen after the Dutch club and the Vietnamese football club failed to reach an agreement to extend his loan contract in the Netherlands.

=== Công An Hà Nội ===
After 13 years at Hà Nội, on 18 December 2023, Văn Hậu joined 2022 V.League 2 league champions and newly promoted side, Công An Hà Nội.

He contributed in the team's 2023 V.League 1 title win before the injury recurred, forcing him to suspend playing for 2 years.

==== 2023–2025: Long-term injury ====
In September 2023, Văn Hậu suffered from inflammation of the Achilles tendon insertion. This injury caused him to miss important training camps and matches for the Vietnam national team, including the 2023 AFC Asian Cup and the 2026 World Cup qualifiers. Initially, he traveled to Singapore for treatment three times in late 2023 and early 2024; however, the recovery process was complex and did not yield the expected results. In September 2024, introduced by coach Kim Sang-sik, Văn Hậu went to South Korea for intensive physical therapy. However, as the injury was related to Haglund's syndrome (retrocalcaneal exostosis), he was forced to undergo definitive surgery in January 2025. This surgery caused him to continue missing the majority of the 2024–2025 season.

After more than two years (25 months) away from the pitch, on 3 December 2025, Văn Hậu officially made his comeback in a match against Buriram United in the ASEAN Club Championship, in a match that ended in a 1–1 draw.

== International career ==
=== Youth ===
==== U-19 and U-20 World Cup ====
Văn Hậu made his first international appearance for the Vietnam national under-20 football team in 2016 AFC U-19 Championship at the age of 16. In the match against North Korea, one of Asia's major youth giant and runners-up of previous 2014 AFC U-19 Championship, he scored in an astonishing goal from distance as Vietnam registered their historic 2–1 win over North Korea, set up the historic journey as Vietnam would eventually make their first major FIFA 11-men football debut, the 2017 FIFA U-20 World Cup. In the U-20 World Cup, he didn't score any goals as the team exited with only a point.

==== U-22, U23, and Olympics ====
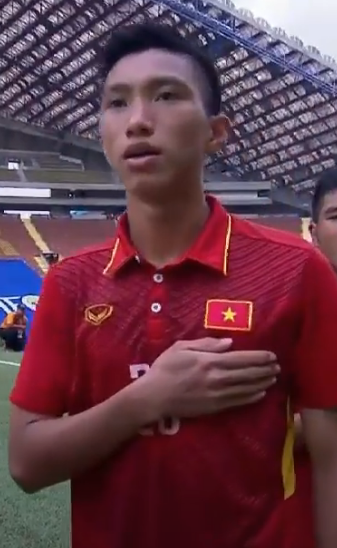
Văn Hậu with Vietnam U22 at the 2017 SEA Games

Văn Hậu's talents got himself promoted to the U-22, U23 and Olympic team in spite of his age. He made his debut on the U-22 team in the CFA friendly tournament in China, and scored a goal against Uzbekistan in a 1–3 defeat. He would later participate in the 2017 SEA Games, scored 2 goals but his Olympic team had to end up in poor note, being eliminated from the group stage.

However, his role became prominent in the 2018 AFC U-23 Championship. Although scoring no goal, he gave a magnificent performance, assisted for Nguyễn Quang Hải to score in the 1–2 defeat to South Korea and his tackles against Iraq as Vietnam advanced to their first final in any AFC tournament, which earned reputation by Dutch press as "Doan Van Bale".

In 2018 Vinaphone Cup, he scored a trivela goal that helped Vietnam beat Oman 1–0.

Văn Hậu played a vital role in Vietnam's 2019 SEA Games campaign, scoring two goals in a 3–0 victory against Olympic Indonesia in the Gold medal match.

=== Senior ===
Due to his good performances at youth teams, Văn Hậu was named on Park Hang-seo squad for the 2018 AFF Championship and played an instrumental role on helping Vietnam to gain the second title, assisting important goals for his teammates which made him one of eleven main players of the tournament.

However, it was the 2019 AFC Asian Cup, in which he was one of the youngest players in the tournament at the age of 19, that saw him earned reputation. His notable performance was against Jordan, where he prevented several of Jordanian attacks as Vietnam marched to the quarter-finals for the second consecutive time. He was later named as one of 10 best young players at the tournament.

Văn Hậu appeared in all 8 matches in the second round of 2022 FIFA World Cup qualification where he contributed significantly to the team success of reaching the final round of the qualifying process. However, his recurrence of torn meniscus injury forced him to miss the first 2 matches of third round against Saudi Arabia and Australia in early September 2021. On 13 September 2021, Hanoi FC confirmed Văn Hậu would undergo a comprehensive surgery in South Korea to completely treat the injury, which lasted several months. Therefore, he had miss all 10 matches of Vietnam in the third round.

== Playing style ==
Văn Hậu is well known for his work-rate and hard-tackling style of play thanks to his height. He is quick, aggressive, physically strong, and a tenacious defender. However, despite his defensive abilities, he has also drawn criticism in the media due to his tendency to pick up cards, as he has often shown unsportsmanlike behaviour. On several occasions, he displayed vicious actions on the pitch during the AFF Championship through his rough tackles, elbow strikes and blatant punches to the opponent player. These antics made him one of the most controversial and violent players in Southeast Asia, and often made him the target of retaliatory fouls from opponents.

== Career statistics ==
=== Club ===
As of match played 19 November 2026

Appearances and goals by club, season and competition
Club	Season	League			National cup (Note: Includes Includes Vietnamese Cup, KNVB Cup)		Continental		Other		Total	
Club	Season	Division	Apps	Goals	Apps	Goals	Apps	Goals	Apps	Goals	Apps	Goals
Hà Nội B	2015	Third Division	5	0	—		—		1 (Note: Appearance in Third Division promotion play-off)	0	6	0
Hà Nội B	2016	Second Division	12	2	—		—		—		12	2
Hà Nội B	Total		17	2	0	0	0	0	1	0	18	2
Hà Nội	2017	V.League 1	11	1	0	0	1 (Note: Appearances in AFC Cup / AFC Champions League Two)	0	—		12	1
Hà Nội	2018	V.League 1	20	5	2	0	—		—		22	5
Hà Nội	2019	V.League 1	21	0	1	0	11 (Note: Two appearances in AFC Champions League play-off round and nine appearances in AFC Cup)	0	1 (Note: Appearances in Vietnamese Super Cup)	0	34	0
Hà Nội	2020	V.League 1	2	0	0	0	—		—		2	0
Hà Nội	2021	V.League 1	0	0	0	0	—		—		0	0
Hà Nội	2022	V.League 1	16	2	2	1	—		—		18	3
Hà Nội	Total		70	8	5	1	12	0	1	0	88	9
Jong SC Heerenveen (loan)	2019–20	Beloften Eredivisie	10	0	0	0	—		—		10	0
Heerenveen (loan)	2019–20	Eredivisie	0	0	1	0	—		—		1	0
Công An Hà Nội	2023	V.League 1	18	0	2	1	—		—		20	1
Công An Hà Nội	2023–24	V.League 1	0	0	0	0	—		0	0	0	0
Công An Hà Nội	2024–25	V.League 1	0	0	0	0	—		—		0	0
Công An Hà Nội	2025–26	V.League 1	12	1	0	0	2	0	2 (Note: Appearances in ASEAN Club Championship)	0	16	1
Công An Hà Nội	2026–27	V.League 1	3	0	0	0	4 (Note: Appearances in AFC Champions League Elite)	0	3 (Note: One appearance in Vietnamese Super Cup, two appearances in ASEAN Club Championship)	0	10	0
Công An Hà Nội	Total		33	1	2	1	6	0	5	0	46	2
Career total			130	11	8	2	18	0	7	0	163	13

=== International ===
As of match played 3 August 2026

Appearances and goals by national team and year
National team	Year	Apps	Goals
Vietnam	2017	3	0
Vietnam	2018	8	1
Vietnam	2019	12	0
Vietnam	2021	3	0
Vietnam	2022	4	1
Vietnam	2023	7	0
Vietnam	2026	6	0
Total		43	2

Vietnam score listed first, score column indicates score after each Văn Hậu goal

List of international goals scored by Đoàn Văn Hậu
No.	Date	Venue	Opponent	Score	Result	Competition
1.	31 December 2018	Grand Hamad Stadium, Doha, Qatar	Philippines	3–2	4–2	Friendly
2.	21 December 2022	New Laos National Stadium, Vientiane, Laos	Laos	4–0	6–0	2022 AFF Championship

== Honours ==
Hà Nội

- V.League 1: 2018; 2022
- Vietnamese National Cup: 2020, 2022
- Vietnamese Super Cup: 2019, 2021

Công An Hà Nội

- V.League 1: 2023, 2025–26
- Vietnamese National Cup: 2024–25
- Vietnamese Super Cup: 2026

Vietnam U19

- AFF U-19 Youth Championship third place : 2016
- AFC U-19 Championship third place : 2016

Vietnam U23/Olympic

- AFC U-23 Championship runner-up: 2018
- Asian Games fourth place: 2018
- SEA Games gold medal: 2019
- VFF Cup: 2018

Vietnam

- AFF Championship: 2018, 2026; runner-up: 2022
- King's Cup runner-up: 2019
- VFF Cup: 2022

Individual

- AFF Youth Player of the Year: 2017
- Youth Vietnamese Player of the Year: 2017, 2018, 2019
- AFF Championship Best XI: 2018
- AFF Championship All-Star XI: 2022
- V.League 1 Team of the Season: 2023
