= Sani Rizki Fauzi =

Indonesian footballer

Sani Rizki
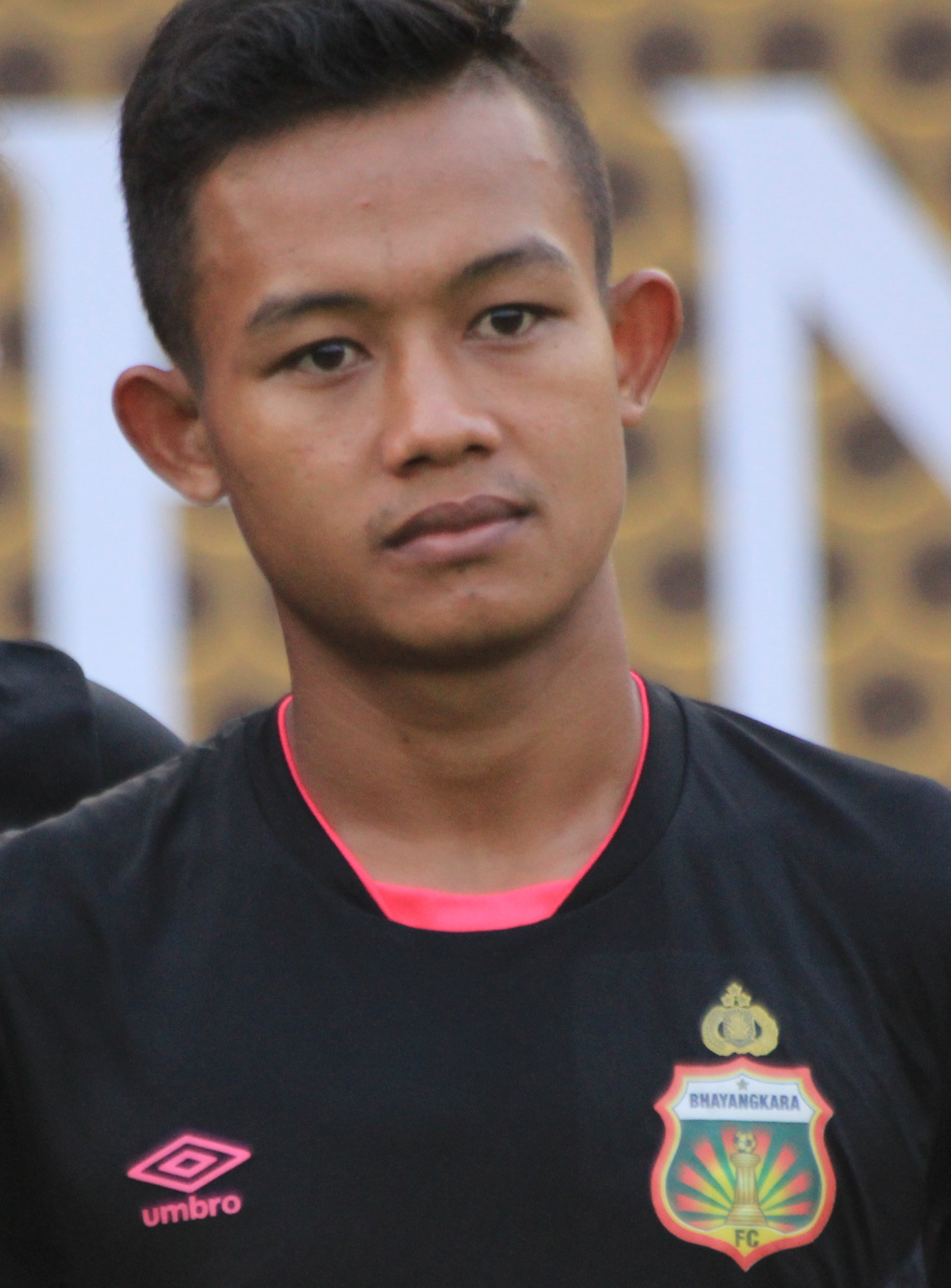
- Sani Rizki with Bhayangkara in 2018

Personal information
- Full name: Sani Rizki Fauzi
- Date of birth: 7 January 1998 (age 28)
- Place of birth: Sukabumi, Indonesia
- Height: 1.65 m (5 ft 5 in)
- Positions: Winger; full-back

Team information
- Current team: Bhayangkara
- Number: 21

Youth career
- 2017: Bhayangkara

Senior career*
| Years | Team | Apps | (Gls) |
| 2018– | Bhayangkara | 152 | (16) |

International career
| 2019 | Indonesia U23 | 14 | (2) |
| 2022 | Indonesia | 2 | (0) |
Medal record
Men's football
Representing Indonesia
Southeast Asian Games
| Silver medal – second place | 2019 Philippines | Team |
AFF U-22 Youth Championship
| Winner | 2019 Cambodia | Team |
- * Club domestic league appearances and goals as of 5 January 2026

Sani Rizki Fauzi (born 7 January 1998) is an Indonesian professional footballer who plays as a winger or full-back for Super League club Bhayangkara.

== Club career ==
=== Bhayangkara FC ===
In 2018, Sani Rizki is one of the young players promoted from the Bhayangkara youth team. Sani made his first-team debut on 23 March 2018 in a 0–0 draw against Persija Jakarta. On 3 August 2018, Sani Rizki scored his first goal for Bhayangkara against PSMS Medan in the 4th minute at the PTIK Stadium, Jakarta. Until the end of the 2018 season, Sani Rizki was often trusted by coach Simon McMenemy to fill Bhayangkara FC's first starting eleven, he contributed with 18 league appearances, scoring one goal for Bhayangkara.

On 21 May 2019, he started his match in the 2019 Liga 1 for Bhayangkara, playing as a substituted Flávio Beck Júnior in a 1–0 lose over Bali United. On 18 September, he was coming on as a substituted in a 1–4 away win over PS Barito Putera and assisting Bhayangkara's fourth goal, scored by Herman Dzumafo. On 21 December, Sani Rizki scored his first league goal of the season, scoring in the 41st minute and provided assists for Bruno Matos in Bhayangkara's 2–3 away win over PSIS Semarang. He made 15 league appearances and scored one goal and one assist over the season as the club finished in 3rd place.

Sani Rizki only played one times for the club in 2020 season because the league was officially discontinued due to the COVID-19 pandemic.

Sani Rizki give assists an opening goal by Adam Alis in Bhayangkara's 0–2 win over Persipura Jayapura on 2 December 2021. Sani Rizki scored his first goal of the 2021–22 season on 6 February 2022, in an 0–1 win game against Persib Bandung. He contributed with 26 league appearances, scored one goal and 2 assists during his 2021–22 season.

Sani Rizki spent pre-season with Bhayangkara in the 2022 Indonesia President's Cup Group Stage, scoring one goal in a 1–2 win against Bali United on 16 June 2022. Sani Rizki scored his first goal of the 2022–23 season on 24 July, in an 2–2 draw over Persib. The goal attracted the attention of Persib's supporters, after scoring a goal, he made a unique celebration, he made a respectful hand gesture after being approached by his teammates. He added his second goals of the season on 13 September with one goal against Borneo Samarinda in a 2–2 draw at Wibawa Mukti Stadium. On 19 January 2023, he scored equalizer in a 2–3 lose against Persik Kediri. His performances in February and March saw him provide one assist each in the win against Borneo Samarinda on 25 February, and win against PSIS Semarang on 1 March. On 11 March, Sani Rizki scored the opening goal for the club, scoring a long range in a 3–1 win over Bali United at Wibawa Mukti. On 30 March, he assisted a further two goals in Bhayangkara's 5–1 victory over RANS Nusantara. On 14 April, he scored one goal and assisted one in a 0–3 victory against Arema. Bhayangkara closed the season with 51 points, the same number as Madura United in sixth place. By the end of the 2022–23 season, he was a starter in all of the club's Liga 1 fixtures, only missed one match, contributed this season with the club by scoring five goals and six assists.

== International career ==
In January 2022, Sani was called up to the senior team in a friendly match in Bali by Shin Tae-yong. He earned his first cap in a 4–1 win friendly match against Timor Leste on 27 January 2022.

== Personal life ==
Sani's father is Edi Riadi and his mother is Ida Kusumawati. He is a First Police Brigadier in the Indonesian National Police.

== Career statistics ==
=== Club ===
As of match played 5 January 2026

| Club | Season | League | | | Cup (Note: Includes Piala Indonesia) | | Continental | | Other | | Total | |
| Club | Season | Division | Apps | Goals | Apps | Goals | Apps | Goals | Apps | Goals | Apps | Goals |
|---|---|---|---|---|---|---|---|---|---|---|---|---|
| Bhayangkara | 2018 | Liga 1 | 18 | 1 | 0 | 0 | – | | 2 (Note: Appearances in Indonesia President's Cup) | 0 | 20 | 1 |
| Bhayangkara | 2019 | Liga 1 | 15 | 1 | 1 | 0 | – | | 0 | 0 | 16 | 1 |
| Bhayangkara | 2020 | Liga 1 | 1 | 0 | 0 | 0 | – | | 0 | 0 | 1 | 0 |
| Bhayangkara | 2021–22 | Liga 1 | 26 | 1 | 0 | 0 | – | | 3 (Note: Appearances in Menpora Cup) | 1 | 29 | 2 |
| Bhayangkara | 2022–23 | Liga 1 | 33 | 5 | 0 | 0 | – | | 4 | 1 | 37 | 6 |
| Bhayangkara | 2023–24 | Liga 1 | 25 | 3 | 0 | 0 | – | | 0 | 0 | 25 | 3 |
| Bhayangkara | 2024–25 | Liga 2 | 21 | 4 | 0 | 0 | – | | 0 | 0 | 21 | 4 |
| Bhayangkara | 2025–26 | Super League | 13 | 1 | 0 | 0 | – | | 0 | 0 | 13 | 1 |
| Career total | | | 152 | 16 | 1 | 0 | 0 | 0 | 9 | 2 | 162 | 18 |

=== International ===
As of match played 30 January 2022

Appearances and goals by national team and year
| National team | Year | Apps | Goals |
|---|---|---|---|
| Indonesia | 2022 | 2 | 0 |
| Total | | 2 | 0 |

== Honours ==
Bhayangkara

- Liga 2 runner-up: 2024–25

Indonesia U-23

- AFF U-22 Youth Championship: 2019
- SEA Games silver medal: 2019
