= Nguyễn Đức Chiến =

Vietnamese footballer

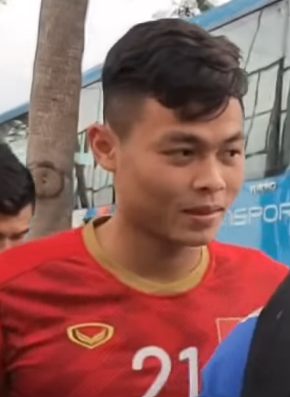
- Đức Chiến in 2019

Personal information
- Full name: Nguyễn Đức Chiến
- Date of birth: 24 August 1998 (age 28)
- Place of birth: Chí Linh, Hải Dương, Vietnam
- Height: 1.80 m (5 ft 11 in)
- Positions: Centre back; defensive midfielder

Team information
- Current team: Ninh Bình
- Number: 7

Youth career
- 2012–2019: Viettel

Senior career*
Years	Team	Apps	(Gls)
2019–2025	Viettel	120	(13)
2025–	Ninh Bình	31	(2)

International career^{‡}
2019–2020	Vietnam U23	3	(0)
2022–	Vietnam	7	(0)
- * Club domestic league appearances and goals as of 30 October 2026 ‡ National team caps and goals as of 14 October 2025

Nguyễn Đức Chiến (born 24 August 1998), is a Vietnamese professional footballer who plays as a centre back and defensive midfielder for V.League 1 side Ninh Bình.

== Career statistics ==
=== Club ===
As of 4 April 2024.

Club	Season	League			Cup		Continental		Other		Total	
Club	Season	Division	Apps	Goals	Apps	Goals	Apps	Goals	Apps	Goals	Apps	Goals
Viettel	2019	V.League 1	24	1	0	0	–		0	0	24	1
Viettel	2020	V.League 1	18	1	0	0	–		0	0	18	1
Viettel	2021	V.League 1	2	0	0	0	0	0	1 (Note: Appearances in the Vietnamese Super Cup)	0	3	0
Viettel	2022	V.League 1	14	0	0	0	–		0	0	14	0
Viettel	2023	V.League 1	16	7	0	0	–		0	0	16	7
Viettel	2023-24	V.League 1	14	1	0	0	–		0	0	14	1
Career total			88	10	0	0	0	0	1	0	89	10

== Honours ==
Viettel

- V.League 1: 2020

Vietnam U23/Olympic

- SEA Games gold medal: 2019
