= Nguyễn Trọng Hùng =

Vietnamese footballer

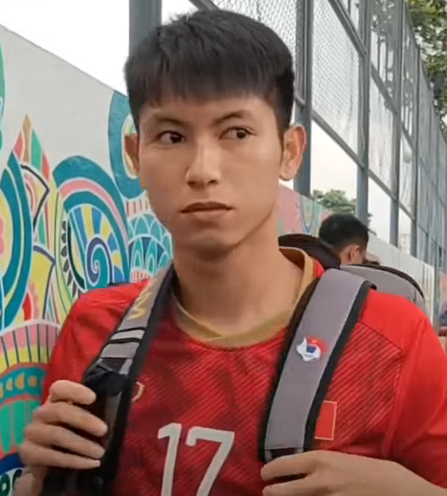
- Trọng Hùng in 2019

Personal information
- Full name: Nguyễn Trọng Hùng
- Date of birth: 3 October 1997 (age 29)
- Place of birth: Thanh Hóa, Vietnam
- Height: 1.72 m (5 ft 8 in)
- Position: Winger

Team information
- Current team: Becamex Hồ Chí Minh City
- Number: 20

Youth career
- 2009–2011: PVF
- 2011–2018: Thanh Hóa

Senior career*
Years	Team	Apps	(Gls)
2015–2018	→ Phù Đổng (loan)		
2019–2025	Thanh Hóa	77	(4)
2025–	Becamex Hồ Chí Minh City	8	(0)

International career
2018–2020	Vietnam U23	9	(1)
Medal record
Men's football
Representing Vietnam
SEA Games
Gold medal – first place	Manila 2019	Team
- * Club domestic league appearances and goals as of 7 June 2026

Nguyễn Trọng Hùng (born 3 October 1997) is a Vietnamese professional footballer who plays as a winger for V.League 1 club Becamex Hồ Chí Minh City.

== International career ==
=== Vietnam U-23 ===
#	Date	Venue	Opponent	Score	Result	Competition
1.	25 November 2019	Biñan, Philippines	Brunei	6–0	6–0	SEA Games 2019

== Honours ==
=== Club ===
Đông Á Thanh Hóa

- Vietnamese National Cup: 2023, 2023–24
- Vietnamese Super Cup: 2023

Vietnam U23

- SEA Games gold medal: 2019
