= Dennis Chung =

Filipino footballer (born 2001)

Personal information
- Full name: Dennis Salazar Chung
- Date of birth: 24 January 2001 (age 25)
- Place of birth: Berlin, Germany
- Height: 1.68 m (5 ft 6 in)
- Positions: Attacking midfielder; winger

Team information
- Current team: One Taguig
- Number: 7

Youth career
- Tennis Borussia Berlin
- MSV Normannia 08
- 1. FC Lübars
- –2019: Hertha BSC
- 2019–2020: Hertha Zehlendorf

College career
Years	Team	Apps	(Gls)
2020–2021	Harcum Bears	13	(7)

Senior career*
Years	Team	Apps	(Gls)
2021–2023	Azkals Development Team	8	(1)
2023	Azkals Development Academy		
2024–	One Taguig	2	(1)

International career
2019–2023	Philippines U23	18	(4)
2023–	Philippines	1	(0)
- * Club domestic league appearances and goals as of 14 April 2024

Dennis Salazar Chung (born 24 January 2001) is a professional footballer who plays as an attacking midfielder or winger for One Taguig. Born in Germany, he plays for the Philippines national team.

== Club career ==
=== Youth ===
As a youth player, he joined the youth academy of Hertha BSC in the German Bundesliga. In 2019, Chung signed for German fifth division side Hertha 03.

=== College ===
Before the 2021 season, he joined the Harcum Bears in the United States.

=== Azkals Development Team ===
In 2021, he signed for Filipino club ADT.

== International career ==
Chung is eligible to represent the Philippines internationally through his mother and is also eligible to represent China internationally through his father.

=== Philippines U23 ===
In 2019, Chung was included in the 20-man squad for the 30th Southeast Asian Games. He made his debut for the Philippines U-23 team in a 1–1 draw against Cambodia, scoring the equalizer in the 86th minute.

In 2021, Chung was included in the 23-man squad for the 2022 AFC U-23 Asian Cup qualification matches against South Korea, Singapore and Timor-Leste.

At the 2022 AFF U-23 Championship, Chung scored in a 2–1 win against Brunei.

In 2022, Chung was included in the 20-man squad for the 31st Southeast Asian Games held in Vietnam. He scored in the opening match against Timor-Leste, which the Philippines won 4–0.

=== Philippines ===
Chung was included in the Philippines' 24-man squad for the 2020 AFF Championship.
