= Lê Ngọc Bảo =

Vietnamese footballer (born 1998)

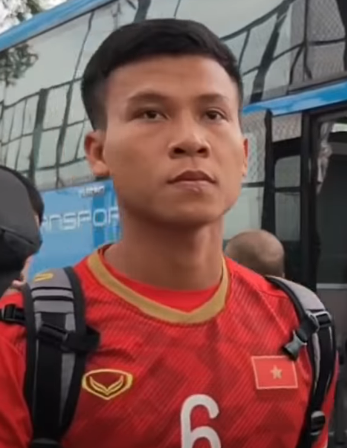
- Ngọc Bảo in 2019

Personal information
- Full name: Lê Ngọc Bảo
- Date of birth: 27 March 1998 (age 28)
- Place of birth: Tuy Hòa, Phú Yên, Vietnam
- Height: 1.78 m (5 ft 10 in)
- Position: Center back

Team information
- Current team: Ninh Bình
- Number: 17

Youth career
- 2010–2016: PVF

Senior career*
Years	Team	Apps	(Gls)
2016–2017	Than Quảng Ninh	0	(0)
2017–2018	Cần Thơ	25	(0)
2019–2021	Phố Hiến	28	(0)
2022–2024	Quy Nhơn Bình Định	40	(1)
2024	→ Thép Xanh Nam Định (loan)	9	(0)
2024–	Ninh Bình	20	(0)
2024–2025	→ PVF-CAND (loan)	14	(0)

International career^{‡}
2019–2020	Vietnam U23	8	(0)
2024–	Vietnam	7	(0)
Medal record
Men's football
Representing Vietnam
SEA Games
Gold medal – first place	Manila 2019	Team
- * Club domestic league appearances and goals as of 17 October 2026 ‡ National team caps and goals as of 5 October 2026

Lê Ngọc Bảo (born 27 March 1998) is a Vietnamese professional footballer who plays as a center back for V.League 1 club Ninh Bình and the Vietnam national team.

== Club career ==
Bảo joined V.League 1 side Than Quảng Ninh in 2016 after graduating from the PVF Football Academy. He was part of the V.League winning squad but did not make any appearance during the season. He was released after one season and joined Cần Thơ, where he had more game time but did not start regularly.

In 2019, Bảo joined V.League 2 team Phố Hiến, the first team of his former academy PVF. He quickly became the leader of the team's defense and lead the team finish as runner-up in the 2019 season. Bảo suffered from a anterior cruciate ligament injury in 2020 which made him unavailable for most of the 2021 season.

In 2022, Bảo signed for V.League 1 side Bình Định.

On 21 March 2024, Thép Xanh Nam Định announced the signing of Ngọc Bảo to the team on a loan deal until the end of the 2023–24 season.

In August 2024, Ngọc Bảo signed for V.League 2 club LPBank HCMC. However, the club later transferred all their players to Phù Đổng Ninh Bình, resulting in Ngọc Bảo to move club again. A month late, he was loaned to his former club PVF-CAND, also playing in the V.League 2.

== International career ==
In 2019, Bảo was named in Vietnam national under-23 team squad for the 2019 SEA Games. He featured in 5 matches during the tournament as the Vietnam's men side win their first SEA Games Gold Medal since the country's unification.

In December 2023, Bảo received his first call up to be Vietnam national team and was named in the preliminary squad for the 2023 AFC Asian Cup. On 9 January 2024, he made his international debut, playing 30 minutes in Vietnam's 1–2 defeat against Kyrgyzstan. Later, he featured in Vietnam's 26-men squad for the Asian Cup.

== Honours ==
Than Quảng Ninh

- V.League 1: 2016
- Vietnamese Super Cup: 2016

Quy Nhơn Bình Định

- Vietnamese National Cup runner-up: 2022

Thép Xanh Nam Định

- V.League 1: 2023–24

Vietnam U23

- SEA Games gold medal : 2019

Individual

- V.League 2 Team of the Season: 2024–25
