= Triệu Việt Hưng =

Vietnamese footballer

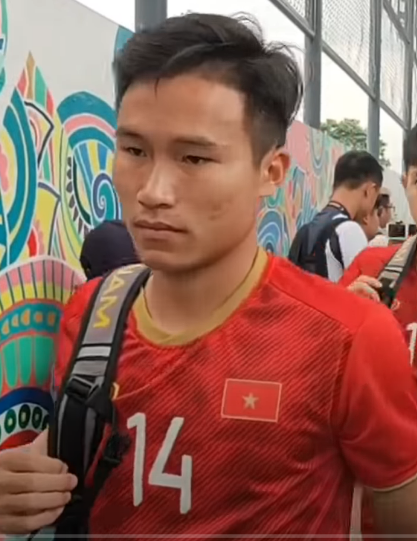
- Việt Hưng in 2019

Personal information
- Full name: Triệu Việt Hưng
- Date of birth: 19 January 1997 (age 29)
- Place of birth: Cẩm Giàng, Hải Dương, Vietnam
- Height: 1.71 m (5 ft 7 in)
- Positions: Winger; midfielder

Team information
- Current team: Thể Công–Viettel
- Number: 97

Youth career
- 2008–2015: Hoàng Anh Gia Lai

Senior career*
Years	Team	Apps	(Gls)
2014–2015	→ Phú Yên (loan)		
2016–2022	Hoàng Anh Gia Lai	73	(5)
2022	→ Hải Phòng (loan)	22	(3)
2023–2026	Hải Phòng	104	(12)
2026–	Thể Công–Viettel	2	(0)

International career^{‡}
2011–2014	Vietnam U16	13	(4)
2016–2018	Vietnam U19	13	(0)
2017–2018	Vietnam U21	5	(0)
2018–2020	Vietnam U23	8	(3)
2023–	Vietnam	4	(0)
- * Club domestic league appearances and goals as of 11 September 2026 ‡ National team caps and goals as of 19 March 2025

Triệu Việt Hưng (born 19 January 1997) is a Vietnamese professional footballer who plays as a winger or midfielder for V.League 1 club Thể Công–Viettel.

== Club career ==
After his contract with Hải Phòng expired, in July 2026, Việt Hưng joined league fellow Thể Công–Viettel.

== International career ==
=== Vietnam U-16 ===
#	Date	Venue	Opponent	Score	Result	Competition
1.	12 July 2011	New Laos National Stadium, Vientiane, Laos	Cambodia	1-0	4-1	2011 AFF U-16 Youth Championship
2.	12 July 2011	New Laos National Stadium, Vientiane, Laos	Cambodia	4-1	4-1	2011 AFF U-16 Youth Championship
3.	14 July 2011	New Laos National Stadium, Vientiane, Laos	Philippines	9-0	10-0	2011 AFF U-16 Youth Championship
4.	16 July 2011	New Laos National Stadium, Vientiane, Laos	Myanmar	1-2	1-3	2011 AFF U-16 Youth Championship

=== Vietnam U-23 ===
#	Date	Venue	Opponent	Score	Result	Competition
1	22 March 2019	Mỹ Đình National Stadium, Hanoi, Vietnam	Brunei	4–0	6–0	2020 AFC U-23 Championship qualification
2	24 March 2019	Mỹ Đình National Stadium, Hanoi, Vietnam	Indonesia	1–0	1–0	2020 AFC U-23 Championship qualification
3	7 June 2019	Việt Trì Stadium, Phú Thọ, Vietnam	Myanmar	1–0	2–0	Friendly
4	25 October 2019	Biñan Football Stadium, Biñan, Philippines	Brunei	4–0	6–0	Sea Games 2019

== Honours ==
Vietnam U21

- International U-21 Thanh Niên Newspaper Cup runner-up: 2017

Vietnam U23

- SEA Games gold medal: 2019
