= Hlaing Bo Bo =

Burmese footballer (born 1996)

Personal information
- Full name: Hlaing Bo Bo
- Date of birth: 8 July 1996 (age 30)
- Place of birth: Mandalay, Myanmar
- Height: 1.69 m (5 ft 6 1/2 in)
- Position: Midfielder

Team information
- Current team: Shan United
- Number: 22

Senior career*
| Years | Team | Apps | (Gls) |
| 2014–2023 | Yadanarbon | 167 | (14) |
| 2021 | → Sukhothai (loan) | 2 | (0) |
| 2023–2024 | Yangon United | 18 | (1) |
| 2025– | Shan United | | |

International career^{‡}
| 2014–2018 | Myanmar U23 | 21 | (4) |
| 2015– | Myanmar | 41 | (6) |
Medal record
Myanmar Under-23
Sea Games
| Silver medal – second place | Sea Games 2015 | Football |
Sea Games
| Bronze medal – third place | Sea Games 2019 | Football |
- * Club domestic league appearances and goals as of 1 November 2023 ‡ National team caps and goals as of 15 June 2023

Hlaing Bo Bo (born 8 July 1996) is a Burmese professional footballer who plays as a midfielder for Myanmar National League club Yangon United and the Myanmar national football team.

== Club career ==
Hlaing Bo Bo played with his club at the 2015 AFC Cup, where he scored twice as well as being yellow carded in a 4–7 loss to Pahang FA.

He joined Sukhothai on loan, failing to make a real impact during that time. He returned to Yadanarbon and eventually became captain for the rest of the 2022 Myanmar National League season; however, he has received two red cards due to unprofessional behavior towards referees.

After a disappointing 2022 season, Hlaing Bo Bo joined Yangon United. He stated that this may be his last club and might retire, focusing on a coaching career in the near future, after joining an interview with MNL.

== International career ==
=== U-23 career ===
Hlaing Bo Bo represented his country at the 2016 AFC U-23 Championship qualification, where in the first game against Chinese Taipei he scored twice in a 3–0 win. However, in the next match against Hong Kong Hlaing Bo Bo revived a red card and missed the rest of the qualifying games.

Hlaing Bo Bo also played at the 2015 Southeast Asian Games where he participated in every match as Myanmar made it to the final. He was also mentioned as one of Myanmar's top performers during the tournament.

=== Senior career ===
He made his senior debut on 7 September 2015 in an exhibition match against New Zealand.

=== International goals ===
Scores and results list Myanmar's goal tally first.

| No. | Date | Venue | Opponent | Score | Result | Competition |
|---|---|---|---|---|---|---|
| 1. | 12 November 2018 | Mandalarthiri Stadium, Mandalay, Myanmar | Cambodia | 1–1 | 4–1 | 2018 AFF Championship |
| 2. | 12 November 2018 | Mandalarthiri Stadium, Mandalay, Myanmar | Cambodia | 4–1 | 4–1 | 2018 AFF Championship |
| 3. | 30 August 2019 | NFTC Stadium, China | China | 1–4 | 1–4 | Friendly |
| 4. | 7 November 2019 | Mandalarthiri Stadium Mandalay | Nepal | 3–0 | 3–0 | Friendly |
| 5. | 19 November 2019 | Thuwunna Stadium Yangon | Mongolia | 1–0 | 1–0 | 2022 FIFA World Cup qualification |
| 6. | 11 June 2021 | Yanmar Stadium Nagai, Osaka, Japan | Kyrgyzstan | 1–7 | 1–8 | 2022 FIFA World Cup qualification |

== Honours ==
Myanmar U-23

- Southeast Asian Games (bronze) Bronze medal: 2019
- Southeast Asian Games (silver) Silver medal: 2015

Individual

- AFF Championship Best Eleven: 2018
