= Nguyễn Văn Toản (footballer, born 1999) =

Vietnamese footballer

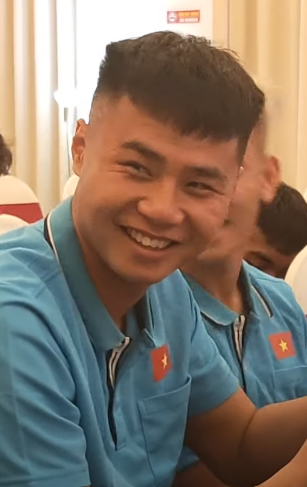
- Nguyễn Văn Toản in 2019

Personal information
- Full name: Nguyễn Văn Toản
- Date of birth: 26 November 1999 (age 26)
- Place of birth: Thủy Nguyên, Hải Phòng, Vietnam
- Height: 1.86 m (6 ft 1 in)
- Position: Goalkeeper

Team information
- Current team: Hải Phòng
- Number: 30

Youth career
- 2010–2018: Hải Phòng

Senior career*
Years	Team	Apps	(Gls)
2019–	Hải Phòng	47	(0)
2026	→ SHB Đà Nẵng (loan)	12	(0)

International career^{‡}
2019–2022	Vietnam U23	17	(0)
2021–2024	Vietnam	3	(0)
Medal record
Men's football
Representing Vietnam
AFF Championship
Runner-up	ASEAN 2022	Team
SEA Games
Gold medal – first place	Manila 2019	Team
Gold medal – first place	Hanoi 2021	Team
- * Club domestic league appearances and goals as of 7 June 2026 ‡ National team caps and goals as of 8 November 2022

Nguyễn Văn Toản (born 26 November 1999) is a Vietnamese professional footballer who plays as a goalkeeper for V.League 1 club Hải Phòng.

== Club career ==
Văn Toản made his debut for Hải Phòng in 2019.

In March 2026, Văn Toản was loaned to SHB Đà Nẵng for the second part of the 2025–26 season.

== International career ==
On 12 October 2021, Văn Toản made his international debut for Vietnam in a 1–3 defeat against Oman, as part of the 2022 FIFA World Cup qualifiers.

== Career statistics ==
=== International ===
As of 27 December 2022

Vietnam
Year	Apps	Goals
2021	1	0
2022	2	0
Total	3	0

== Honours ==
Vietnam U23

- SEA Games gold medal: 2019, 2021

Vietnam

- AFF Championship runners-up: 2022
- VFF Cup: 2022
