= Ye Yint Aung (footballer, born 1998) =

Burmese footballer

Personal information
- Full name: Ye Yint Aung
- Date of birth: 26 February 1998 (age 28)
- Place of birth: Indaw, Sagaing, Myanmar
- Height: 1.77 m (5 ft 9 1/2 in)
- Position: Center back

Team information
- Current team: Ayeyawady United
- Number: 5

Youth career
- 2010–2015: Myanmar Football Academy (Mandalay)

Senior career*
| Years | Team | Apps | (Gls) |
| 2015–2020 | Yadanarbon | 29 | (0) |
| 2021–2023 | Hanthawaddy United | | |
| 2024– | Ayeyawady United | | |

International career^{‡}
| 2014–2018 | Myanmar U19 | 6 | (0) |
| 2019– | Myanmar U22 | 11 | (0) |
| 2024– | Myanmar | 1 | (1) |
- * Club domestic league appearances and goals as of 20 July 2015 ‡ National team caps and goals as of 20 July 2015

Ye Yint Aung (Burmese: ရဲရင့်အောင်; born 26 February 1998) is a Burmese footballer who plays for Myanmar National League club Ayeyawady United.

== Club career ==
Ye was born in Indaw Township, Sagaing Division. He played football since he was 13. He also the Captain of Myanmar U-20 National Football Team played in 2017 World Cup U-20 Qualification. 17 October 2015, Yadanarbon signed Ye Yint Aung from Myanmar Football Academy (Mandalay) about 8,000,000 MMK.

== International career ==
Ye scored on his senior national team debut on 14 November 2024 during a friendly match against Singapore.

International goals

| # | Date | Venue | Opponent | Score | Result | Competition |
|---|---|---|---|---|---|---|
| 1. | 14 November 2024 | Singapore National Stadium, Singapore | Singapore | 1–1 | 3–2 | Friendly |
