= City of Imus Grandstand and Track Oval =

Stadium in Imus, Cavite, Philippines

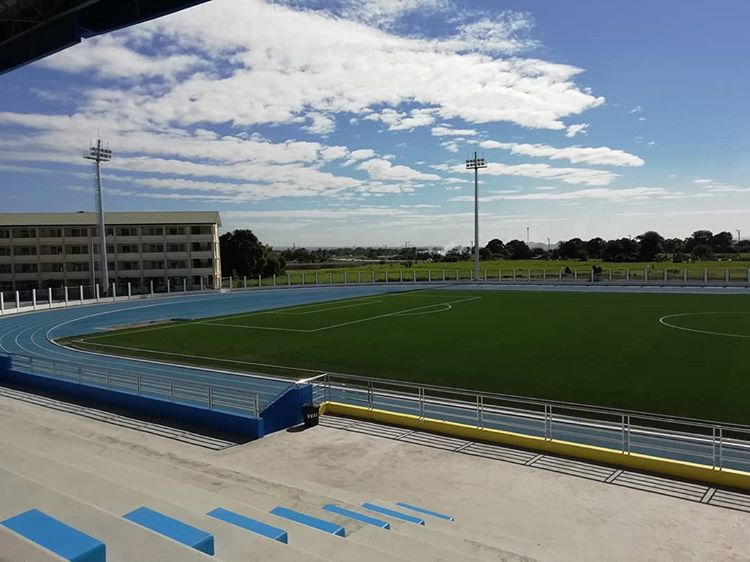
- The Imus Grandstand in February 2019
- Interactive map of City of Imus Grandstand and Track Oval
- Location: Imus, Cavite, Philippines
- Coordinates: 14°23′32.7″N 120°55′09.6″E
- Owner: Imus City Government
- Capacity: 4,800

Construction
- Opened: October 12, 2018

Tenant
- Mendiola 1991

The City of Imus Grandstand and Track Oval (CIGTO) is a multi-purpose stadium, used mostly for football and athletics, in Imus, Cavite, Philippines. It was inaugurated on October 12, 2018 and is situated beside the Ospital ng Imus.

The stadium was among the venues for men's football at the 2019 Southeast Asian Games. It was also used as one of the venues for the 2022 AFF Women's Championship. The venue was the home stadium of Mendiola 1991 for the 2022–23 Philippines Football League season.

It also served as the venue for Panfilo Lacson campaign for the 2022 Philippine presidential election.
