= Soe Moe Kyaw =

Burmese footballer (born 1999)

Personal information
- Full name: Soe Moe Kyaw
- Date of birth: 23 March 1999 (age 27)
- Place of birth: Mandalay, Myanmar
- Height: 1.86 m (6 ft 1 in)
- Position: Centre-back

Team information
- Current team: Uthai Thani
- Number: 6

Youth career
- –2018: IPSE

Senior career*
Years	Team	Apps	(Gls)
2018–2020	Ayeyawady United	74	(3)
2021–2022	Yangon United	0	(0)
2022	Kasetsart	18	(0)
2023–2024	Phnom Penh Crown	22	(4)
2024	Tiffy Army	13	(1)
2025–2026	Uthai Thani	17	(0)

International career^{‡}
	Myanmar U18	6	(0)
2018	Myanmar U20	36	(2)
2018–2022	Myanmar U23	29	(1)
2018–	Myanmar	60	(4)
Medal record
Men's football
Representing Myanmar
AFF U-19 Youth Championship
Silver medal – second place	2018 Indonesia
Sea Games
Bronze medal – third place	2019 philippines
- * Club domestic league appearances and goals as of 28 July 2026 ‡ National team caps and goals as of 4 August 2026

Soe Moe Kyaw (born 23 March 1999) is a Burmese professional footballer who plays as a centre-back for Thai League 1 club Uthai Thani and the Myanmar national team.

== Club career ==
=== Ayeyawady United ===
In 2018, Soe joined Ayeyawady United.

=== Yangon United ===
On 15 January 2021, Soe transferred to Yangon United.

=== Kasetsart ===
On 13 July 2022, Soe moved to Thailand to joined Thai League 2 side, Kasetsart.

=== Phnom Penh Crown ===
On 17 July 2023, Soe moved to Cambodia to joined Cambodia Premier League champions, Phnom Penh Crown.

== International career ==
On 12 October 2023, Soe scored his first international goal against Macau at the Thuwunna Stadium.

On 21 March 2024, he scored a goal during the 2026 FIFA World Cup qualification match against Syria which gave Myanmar a shock lead in their 1–1 draw.

== Style of play ==
Soe is a physically strong player who can score from powerful headers. However, he can get aggressive at times, noticeably in the Asian Cup Qualifiers, where he tackled a Tajikistan player inside the 18-yard box and gave his opponents a goal, and also saw him get a red card.

== Career statistics ==
Appearances and goals by club team and year
Club team	Year	Apps	Goals	Assists
Ayeyawady United	2018	25	0	0
Ayeyawady United	2019	24	1	0
Ayeyawady United	2020	25	2	0
Total		74	3	0

Appearances and goals by club team and year
Club team	Year	Apps	Goals	Assists
Yangon United	2021	0	0	0
Total		0	0	0

Appearances and goals by club team and year
Club team	Year	Apps	Goals	Assists
Kasetsart	2022	18	0	0
Total		18	0	0

Appearances and goals by club team and year
Club team	Year	Apps	Goals	Assists
Phnom Penh Crown	2023	18	3	2
Total		18	3	2

=== International ===
As of match played 4 August 2026

Appearances and goals by national team and year
National team	Year	Apps	Goals
Myanmar	2018	6	0
Myanmar	2019	5	0
Myanmar	2020	0	0
Myanmar	2021	9	0
Myanmar	2022	10	0
Myanmar	2023	9	1
Myanmar	2024	9	1
Myanmar	2025	5	1
Myanmar	2026	7	1
Total		60	4

==== International goals ====
No.	Date	Venue	Opponent	Score	Result	Competition
1.	13 October 2023	Thuwunna Stadium, Yangon, Myanmar	Macau	2–1	5–1	2026 FIFA World Cup qualification
2.	21 March 2024	Thuwunna Stadium, Yangon, Myanmar	Syria	1–0	1–1	2026 FIFA World Cup qualification
3.	10 June 2025	Thuwunna Stadium, Yangon, Myanmar	Syria	1–0	1–0	2027 AFC Asian Cup qualification
4.	6 June 2026	Rizal Memorial Stadium, Manila, Philippines	Guam	1–0	6–1	Friendly
