= 2018 AFF U-19 Youth Championship squads =

The 2018 AFF U-19 Youth Championship was an international football tournament that was held in Indonesia from 1 July to 14 July. The 11 national teams involved in the tournament were required to register a squad of 23 players; only players in these squads are eligible to take part in the tournament.

== Group A ==
=== Indonesia ===
Head Coach: (Indonesia) Indra Sjafri

No.	Pos.	Player	Date of birth (age)	Caps	Goals	Club
1	GK	Muhammad Riyandi	3 January 2000 (aged 18)	10	0	(Football Association of Indonesia) PS Barito Putera
23	GK	Aqil Savik	17 January 1999 (aged 19)	7	0	(Football Association of Indonesia) Persib Bandung
2	DF	Kadek Raditya	13 June 1999 (aged 19)	5	0	(Football Association of Indonesia) Persiba Balikpapan
3	DF	Julyano Pratama	10 July 2000 (aged 17)	4	0	(Football Association of Indonesia) PPLP Ragunan
4	DF	Samuel Christianson	31 July 1999 (aged 18)	7	0	(Football Association of Indonesia) Sriwijaya FC
5	DF	Nurhidayat	5 April 1999 (aged 19)	17	0	(Football Association of Indonesia) Bhayangkara FC
11	DF	Firza Andika	11 May 1999 (aged 19)	13	1	(Football Association of Indonesia) PSMS Medan
12	DF	Rifad Marasabessy	7 July 1999 (aged 18)	15	1	(Football Association of Indonesia) Madura United
18	DF	Muhamad Firly	16 July 1999 (aged 18)	2	0	(Football Association of Indonesia) Bogor FC
13	DF	David Rumakiek	18 July 1999 (aged 18)	4	0	(Football Association of Indonesia) Persipura Jayapura
6	MF	Raffi Syarahil	16 November 2000 (aged 17)	6	0	(Football Association of Indonesia) PS Barito Putera
7	MF	Luthfi Kamal	1 March 1999 (aged 19)	13	2	(Football Association of Indonesia) Mitra Kukar FC
8	MF	Witan Sulaeman	8 October 2001 (aged 16)	12	5	(Football Association of Indonesia) PPLP Ragunan
10	MF	Egy Maulana	7 July 2000 (aged 17)	16	14	(Polish Football Association) Lechia Gdańsk
14	MF	Feby Eka Putra	12 February 1999 (aged 19)	12	4	(Football Association of Indonesia) Bali United FC
15	MF	Saddil Ramdani	2 January 1999 (aged 19)	18	10	(Football Association of Indonesia) Persela Lamongan
16	MF	Resky Fandi	1 February 1999 (aged 19)	4	1	(Football Association of Indonesia) Martapura FC
17	MF	Syahrian Abimanyu	25 April 1999 (aged 19)	17	2	(Football Association of Indonesia) Sriwijaya FC
20	MF	Asnawi Mangkualam	4 October 1999 (aged 18)	15	0	(Football Association of Indonesia) PSM Makassar
22	MF	Todd Ferre	15 March 1999 (aged 19)	7	3	(Football Association of Indonesia) Persipura Jayapura
9	FW	Rafli Mursalim	5 March 1999 (aged 19)	14	11	(Football Association of Indonesia) Mitra Kukar FC
19	FW	Hanis Saghara	8 September 1999 (aged 18)	18	6	(Football Association of Indonesia) Bali United FC
21	FW	Aji Kusuma	30 January 1999 (aged 19)	3	1	(Football Association of Indonesia) Persika Karawang

=== Thailand ===
Head Coach: (Thailand) Issara Sritaro

No.	Pos.	Player	Date of birth (age)	Caps	Goals	Club
1	GK	Nopphon Lakhonphon	19 July 2000 (aged 17)			(Football Association of Thailand) Buriram United
13	GK	Kritsawat Kongkot	26 July 1999 (aged 18)			(Football Association of Thailand) Chainat Hornbill
23	GK	Varuth Wongsomsak	23 June 1999 (aged 19)			(Football Association of Thailand) Bangkok United
2	DF	Nakin Wisetchat	9 July 1999 (aged 18)			(Football Association of Thailand) Bangkok United
3	DF	Kittipong Sansanit	22 March 1999 (aged 19)			(Football Association of Thailand) Assumption United
4	DF	Theerapat Laohabut	23 February 1999 (aged 19)			(Football Association of Thailand) Bangkok
5	DF	Prasittichai Perm	3 March 1999 (aged 19)			(Football Association of Thailand) Pattaya United
6	DF	Kittitach Praniti	30 April 1999 (aged 19)			(Football Association of Thailand) Chonburi
14	DF	Sarawut Munjit	4 January 2000 (aged 18)			(Football Association of Thailand) Buriram United
15	DF	Sampan Kesi	3 July 1999 (aged 18)			(Football Association of Thailand) Nakhon Nayok
17	DF	Kritsana Daokrajai	13 March 2001 (aged 17)			(Football Association of Thailand) Buriram United
20	DF	Anusak Jaiphet	23 June 1999 (aged 19)			(Football Association of Thailand) Police Tero
7	MF	Nattawut Chootiwat	24 June 1999 (aged 19)			(Football Association of Thailand) Chonburi
11	MF	Sakunchai Saengthopho	7 June 1999 (aged 19)			(Football Association of Thailand) Bangkok
16	MF	Narakorn Noomchansakul	12 April 1999 (aged 19)			(Football Association of Thailand) Ratchaburi Mitr Phol
19	MF	Thirapak Prueangna	15 August 2001 (aged 16)			(Football Association of Thailand) Buriram United
21	MF	Panyawat Nisangram	23 February 1999 (aged 19)			(Football Association of Thailand) Buriram United
22	MF	Yutpichai Lertlam	21 April 1999 (aged 19)			(Football Association of Thailand) Buriram United
8	FW	Sittichok Paso (captain)	28 January 1999 (aged 19)			(Football Association of Thailand) Chonburi
9	FW	Mehti Sarakham	21 May 1999 (aged 19)			(Football Association of Thailand) Krabi
10	FW	Suphanat Mueanta	2 August 2002 (aged 15)			(Football Association of Thailand) Buriram United
12	FW	Korrawit Tasa	7 April 2000 (aged 18)			(Football Association of Thailand) Ubon UMT United
18	FW	Pithak Phaphirom	26 February 1999 (aged 19)			(Football Association of Thailand) Pattaya United

=== Vietnam ===
Head Coach: (Vietnam) Hoàng Anh Tuấn

No.	Pos.	Player	Date of birth (age)	Caps	Goals	Club
1	GK	Y Êli Niê	8 January 2001 (aged 17)			(Vietnam Football Federation) Đắk Lắk
13	GK	Nguyễn Nhật Trường				(Vietnam Football Federation) Đồng Tháp
25	GK	Dương Tùng Lâm	22 May 1999 (aged 19)			(Vietnam Football Federation) Hà Nội B
4	DF	Đặng Văn Tới	20 January 1999 (aged 19)			(Vietnam Football Federation) Hà Nội
5	DF	Bùi Hoàng Việt Anh				(Vietnam Football Federation) Hà Nội B
2	DF	Phạm Văn Nam				(Vietnam Football Federation) Hà Nội
20	DF	Liễu Quang Vinh				(Vietnam Football Federation) SHB Đà Nẵng
3	DF	Nguyễn Hùng Thiện Đức				(Vietnam Football Federation) Becamex Bình Dương
6	DF	Nguyễn Hoàng Duy	4 June 1999 (aged 19)			(Vietnam Football Federation) Đồng Tháp
23	DF	Nguyễn Duy Kiên				(Vietnam Football Federation) Hoàng Anh Gia Lai
15	MF	Nguyễn Hữu Thắng				(Vietnam Football Federation) Viettel
14	MF	Trần Văn Công				(Vietnam Football Federation) Hà Nội B
7	MF	Nguyễn Hồng Sơn				(Vietnam Football Federation) Hà Nội
8	MF	Lê Văn Xuân	27 February 1999 (aged 19)			(Vietnam Football Federation) Hà Nội B
12	MF	Cao Tấn Hoài				(Vietnam Football Federation) Đồng Tháp
18	MF	Lê Minh Bình	25 December 1999 (aged 18)			(Vietnam Football Federation) Hoàng Anh Gia Lai
10	MF	Trần Bảo Toàn				(Vietnam Football Federation) Hoàng Anh Gia Lai
21	MF	Dụng Quang Nho	1 January 2000 (aged 18)			(Vietnam Football Federation) Hoàng Anh Gia Lai
16	MF	Nguyễn Trọng Long				(Vietnam Football Federation) PVF
19	FW	Lê Văn Nam				(Vietnam Football Federation) Hà Nội B
9	FW	Lê Xuân Tú	6 September 1999 (aged 18)			(Vietnam Football Federation) Hà Nội B
11	FW	Nhâm Mạnh Dũng				(Vietnam Football Federation) Viettel
17	FW	Trần Danh Trung	3 October 2000 (aged 17)			(Vietnam Football Federation) Viettel

=== Singapore ===
Head Coach: (Netherlands) Rob Servais

No.	Pos.	Player	Date of birth (age)	Caps	Goals	Club
1	GK	Nurshafiq Zaini	26 March 1999 (aged 19)			(Football Association of Singapore) NFA B-18
12	GK	Muhammad Syahrul Nizam Rashid				(Football Association of Singapore) Balestier Khalsa
18	GK	Yeo Wen Bin				(Football Association of Singapore)
2	DF	Muhammad Nazhiim Harman				(Football Association of Singapore) NFA B-18
3	DF	Akmal Bin Azman	21 November 2000 (aged 17)			(Football Association of Singapore) NFA B-18
4	DF	Danish Irfan Azman (Captain (association football))	10 March 1999 (aged 19)			(Football Association of Singapore) NFA B-18
5	DF	Iskandar Radewaldt	7 April 2000 (aged 18)			(Football Association of Singapore)
6	DF	Muhammad Asraf Mohamad Zahid				(Football Association of Singapore) Hougang United
7	DF	Nur Adam Abdullah	13 April 2001 (aged 17)			(Football Association of Singapore) NFA B-18
8	DF	Mohamad Hamizan Mohamad Hisham				(Football Association of Singapore)
11	DF	Syed Akmal	28 April 2000 (aged 18)			(Football Association of Singapore)
16	DF	Muhamad Nabil Iman Mohamad Ismail				(Football Association of Singapore)
19	DF	Zakri Ee Kai Ren	20 November 2000 (aged 17)			(Football Association of Singapore)
21	DF	Qayyum Raishyan Rahmat	5 December 2000 (aged 17)			(Football Association of Singapore) NFA B-18
10	MF	Joel Chew Joon Herng	9 February 2000 (aged 18)			(Football Association of Singapore)
14	MF	Rezza Rezky Yacobjan	8 November 2000 (aged 17)			(Football Association of Singapore) NFA B-18
22	MF	Timothy Yeo	19 October 2000 (aged 17)			(Football Association of Singapore)
13	MF	Syafiq Asaraf	12 June 2000 (aged 18)			(Football Association of Singapore)
9	FW	Muhammad Danial Syafiq Bin Mustaffa				(Football Association of Singapore) NFA B-18
15	FW	Idraki Adnan	13 March 1999 (aged 19)			(Football Association of Singapore) NFA B-18
17	FW	Daniel Goh	13 August 1999 (aged 18)			(Football Association of Singapore)
20	FW	Syahadat Masnawi	7 November 2001 (aged 16)			(Football Association of Singapore) NFA B-18
23	FW	Shahib Masnawi	4 August 2000 (aged 17)			(Football Association of Singapore)

=== Philippines ===
Head Coach: (Japan) Reiji Hirata

No.	Pos.	Player	Date of birth (age)	Caps	Goals	Club
1	GK	Quincy Kammeraad	1 February 2001 (aged 17)			(Philippine Football Federation)
13	GK	Jason Edward Suarez Blanco				(Philippine Football Federation)
22	GK	Jessie Reil Aya-Ay Semblante	22 April 2000 (aged 18)			(Philippine Football Federation)
3	DF	Adam Christopher Bambroffe				(Philippine Football Federation)
5	DF	John Paul Josheb Tenorio Bengay				(Philippine Football Federation)
14	DF	Marc Jessar Paterno Tobias				(Philippine Football Federation)
21	DF	Pete Andrei Forrosuelo	6 July 1999 (aged 18)			(Philippine Football Federation)
11	DF	Redwin Griffith Ngo Monteverde				(Philippine Football Federation)
16	DF	Samuel Reuben Wilhelm Tatoy Chavez				(Philippine Football Federation)
17	DF	Viejay Talisic Frigillano				(Philippine Football Federation)
12	DF	Vince Eric Trembevilla Baito				(Philippine Football Federation)
4	MF	Geri Martini Veliganio Rey				(Philippine Football Federation)
9	MF	Jed Caligdong Bode				(Philippine Football Federation)
24	MF	Joshua Penachos Broce				(Philippine Football Federation)
10	MF	Shanden Tubigon Vergara				(Philippine Football Federation)
15	FW	Anton Prospero Guariña				(Philippine Football Federation)
7	FW	Chester Gio Angeles Pabualan				(Philippine Football Federation)
2	FW	Christopher Jr Amen Villanueva				(Philippine Football Federation)
23	FW	Ealhwine Jehoiakim Acebedo Dalam				(Philippine Football Federation)
19	FW	Fidel Victor Palogan Tacardon				(Philippine Football Federation)
6	FW	Keith Balandra Absalon				(Philippine Football Federation)
8	FW	Leo Gabriel Martin Maquiling				(Philippine Football Federation)
20	FW	Mariano Suba Jr.	2 January 2000 (aged 18)			(Philippine Football Federation)

=== Laos ===
Head Coach: (Thailand) Chusak Sriphum

No.	Pos.	Player	Date of birth (age)	Caps	Goals	Club
1	GK	Kitom Venvongsot	8 June 1999 (aged 19)		0	(Lao Football Federation)
18	GK	Thatsana Thatsana			0	(Lao Football Federation)
12	GK	Xaynakhone Dalasean	13 December 2001 (aged 16)		0	(Lao Football Federation) Lao Toyota FC
3	DF	Xayasith Singsavang	17 December 2000 (aged 17)		1	(Lao Football Federation) Young Elephant FC
4	DF	Chitpasong Latthachack	10 October 1999 (aged 18)		1	(Lao Football Federation) Young Elephant FC
5	DF	Phimmasone Champathong			0	(Lao Football Federation)
6	DF	Kittisak Phomvongsa	27 July 1999 (aged 18)		1	(Lao Football Federation)
14	DF	Mek Insoumang			0	(Lao Football Federation)
15	DF	Sithtee Sannikone			0	(Lao Football Federation) Young Elephant FC
23	MF	Phoutthasone Vongkosy			1	(Lao Football Federation) Lao Toyota FC
7	MF	Phasao Sinonalath			0	(Lao Football Federation)
8	MF	Chanthachone Thinolath			0	(Lao Football Federation)
11	MF	Kiengthavesak Xayxanapanya	14 March 1999 (aged 19)		0	(Lao Football Federation)
13	MF	Boualapha Chaleunsouk			0	(Lao Football Federation)
16	MF	Onkeo Khamsouliya			0	(Lao Football Federation)
17	MF	Phonepaseuth Lathxavong			0	(Lao Football Federation)
19	MF	Sitthikone Khanthavong			0	(Lao Football Federation)
21	MF	Bolik Bousa Ath			0	(Lao Football Federation)
2	FW	Kydavone Souvanny	21 December 1999 (aged 18)		1	(Lao Football Federation) Young Elephant FC
9	FW	Nilan			2	(Lao Football Federation)
10	FW	Bounphachan Bounkong	29 November 2000 (aged 17)		6	(Lao Football Federation) Young Elephant FC
20	FW	Thatsaphone Saysouk	13 September 2000 (aged 17)		0	(Lao Football Federation) Lao Toyota FC
22	FW	Lextoxa Thongsavath			0	(Lao Football Federation) Lao Toyota FC

== Group B ==
=== Malaysia ===
Head Coach: (Croatia) Bojan Hodak

No.	Pos.	Player	Date of birth (age)	Caps	Goals	Club
	GK	Azri Ghani	30 April 1999 (age 27)	11	0	(Football Association of Malaysia) Felda United U-19
	GK	Shafiq Afifi	6 August 1999 (aged 18)	4	0	(Football Association of Malaysia) PKNP
	GK	Firdaus Irman	6 July 2002 (aged 15)	1	0	(Football Association of Malaysia) SSTMI
	DF	Shivan Pillay	7 December 2000 (aged 17)	14	3	(Football Association of Malaysia) PKNS U-19
	DF	Tasnim Fitri	19 January 1999 (aged 19)	8	0	(Football Association of Malaysia) Felda United U-19
	DF	Anwar Ibrahim	10 June 1999 (aged 19)	11	0	(Football Association of Malaysia) Felda United
	DF	Nabil Hakim	9 February 1999 (aged 19)	9	0	(Football Association of Malaysia) Kuala Lumpur U-21
	DF	Izzuddin Roslan	8 December 1999 (aged 18)	7	0	(Football Association of Malaysia) Kuala Lumpur U-19
	DF	Gerald Gadit	16 May 1999 (aged 19)	2	0	(Football Association of Malaysia) Sabah U-19
	DF	Al Imran Halim	16 February 1999 (aged 19)	4	0	(Football Association of Malaysia) UiTM FC
	DF	Syaiful Alias (captain)	12 January 1999 (aged 19)	11	0	(Football Association of Malaysia) Kelantan
	DF	Feroz Baharudin	2 April 2000 (aged 18)	3	0	(Football Association of Malaysia) Johor Darul Ta'zim III
	MF	Zahril Azri	4 February 1999 (aged 19)	12	0	(Football Association of Malaysia) Felda United U-21
	MF	Nurfais Johari	27 March 1999 (aged 19)	12	1	(Football Association of Malaysia) Penang
	MF	Nik Akif	11 May 1999 (aged 19)	12	2	(Football Association of Malaysia) Kelantan
	MF	Nizarruddin Jazi	12 February 2000 (aged 18)	3	1	(Football Association of Malaysia) Melaka United U-19
	MF	Thivandaran Karnan	6 March 2000 (aged 18)	5	0	(Football Association of Malaysia) Penang
	MF	Ammar Akhmal	10 January 1999 (aged 19)	13	1	(Football Association of Malaysia) Felcra FC
	FW	Hadi Fayyadh	21 December 2000 (aged 17)	15	6	(Football Association of Malaysia) Johor Darul Ta'zim II
	FW	Akhyar Rashid	1 May 1999 (aged 19)	11	6	(Football Association of Malaysia) Kedah
	FW	Awang Mohd Faiz	6 March 1999 (aged 19)	7	0	(Football Association of Malaysia) Johor Darul Ta'zim III
	FW	Zafuan Azeman	10 June 1999 (aged 19)	10	2	(Football Association of Malaysia) Kedah
	FW	Syahmi Zamri	1 May 1999 (aged 19)	1	1	(Football Association of Malaysia) Felda United U-19

=== Myanmar ===
Head Coach: (Myanmar) Myo Hlaing Win

No.	Pos.	Player	Date of birth (age)	Caps	Goals	Club
1	GK	Thura Kyaw				(Myanmar Football Federation) Yangon United B-21
25	GK	Zin Nyi Nyi Aung				(Myanmar Football Federation) ISPE B-21
32	GK	Khant Kyaw Oo				(Myanmar Football Federation) Yangon United B-21
2	DF	Than Htike Zin	3 June 1999 (aged 19)			(Myanmar Football Federation) ISPE B-21
4	DF	Aung Wanna Soe				(Myanmar Football Federation) Yadanarbon B-21
5	DF	Hein Zeyar Lin				(Myanmar Football Federation) Myawady B-21
7	DF	Nyein Chan Aung				(Myanmar Football Federation) Yangon United B-19
8	DF	Tay Zaw Lin				(Myanmar Football Federation) Yangon United B-21
12	DF	Soe Moe Kyaw	23 March 1999 (aged 18)			(Myanmar Football Federation) ISPE B-21
17	DF	Si Thu Moe Khant				(Myanmar Football Federation) Hanthawaddy United B-21
19	DF	Ye Lin Htet				(Myanmar Football Federation) Yadanarbon B-21
27	DF	Thura San				(Myanmar Football Federation) Shan United B-21
6	MF	Myat Kaung Khant	15 June 2000 (aged 18)			(Myanmar Football Federation) Yadanarbon
11	MF	Pyae Sone Naing	3 July 2001 (aged 16)			(Myanmar Football Federation) Yadanarbon
20	MF	Lwin Moe Aung	10 December 1999 (aged 17)			(Myanmar Football Federation) ISPE B-21
21	MF	Ye Yint Aung				(Myanmar Football Federation) Yadanarbon B-21
24	MF	Naing Ko Ko				(Myanmar Football Federation) Yangon United B-21
28	MF	Nan Htike Zaw				(Myanmar Football Federation) ISPE U-21
34	MF	Hein Htet Aung	3 June 2000 (aged 18)			(Myanmar Football Federation) Hanthawaddy United
15	FW	Win Naing Tun	3 May 2000 (aged 17)			(Myanmar Football Federation) Yadanarbon
22	FW	Hlawn Moe Oo				(Myanmar Football Federation) Yangon United B-21
29	FW	Htet Phyo Wai				(Myanmar Football Federation) Shan United B-21
	FW	Khin Kyaw Win				(Myanmar Football Federation) ISPE B-21

=== Timor-Leste ===
Head Coach: (South Korea) Kim Shinh-Wan

No.	Pos.	Player	Date of birth (age)	Caps	Goals	Club
20	GK	Natalino Nunes Soares				(East Timor Football Federation)
3	GK	Gumario A. F. Moreira (captain)				(East Timor Football Federation)
1	GK	Fernando Da Costa				(East Timor Football Federation)
5	DF	Joao P. Dos S. Soares				(East Timor Football Federation)
8	DF	Filomeno J. Da Costa				(East Timor Football Federation)
13	DF	Jordao Da Silva				(East Timor Football Federation)
22	DF	Nelson Sarmento Viegas	24 December 1999 (aged 18)			(East Timor Football Federation)
2	DF	Antonio Da Costa Martins				(East Timor Football Federation)
18	DF	Salvador V. Da Silva				(East Timor Football Federation)
19	DF	Jeremias Baptista				(East Timor Football Federation)
7	MF	Yohannes Gusmão	10 January 2000 (aged 18)			(East Timor Football Federation)
9	MF	Rivaldo Franklin Soares Correia	13 March 2000 (aged 18)			(East Timor Football Federation)
11	MF	Mouzinho De Lima	26 February 2002 (aged 16)			(East Timor Football Federation)
14	MF	Kornelis Nahak	12 January 2001 (aged 17)			(East Timor Football Federation)
4	MF	Duarte De J. X. Tilman				(East Timor Football Federation)
6	MF	Jhon Frith Liu Ornai De Oliveira				(East Timor Football Federation)
15	MF	Celso Rebelo Garcia				(East Timor Football Federation)
16	FW	Jefri Da Cruz				(East Timor Football Federation)
21	FW	Expedito Soares	11 October 2002 (aged 15)			(East Timor Football Federation)
17	FW	Paulo Gali	31 December 2004 (aged 13)			(East Timor Football Federation)

=== Cambodia ===
Head Coach: (Japan) Musashi Mizushima

No.	Pos.	Player	Date of birth (age)	Caps	Goals	Club
1	GK	Hul Kimhuy	7 April 2000 (aged 18)			(Football Federation of Cambodia)
22	GK	Chea Vansak	1 June 1998 (aged 20)			(Football Federation of Cambodia) Nagaworld
30	GK	Tha Chan Rithy				(Football Federation of Cambodia)
8	DF	San Kimheng				(Football Federation of Cambodia)
10	DF	Narong Kakada	5 June 1999 (aged 19)			(Football Federation of Cambodia)
12	DF	Lorn Then				(Football Federation of Cambodia)
6	DF	Phach Sochea Vila				(Football Federation of Cambodia)
13	DF	San Bora				(Football Federation of Cambodia)
21	DF	Yet Chetra				(Football Federation of Cambodia)
5	MF	Nop David				(Football Federation of Cambodia)
7	MF	Long Meng Hav				(Football Federation of Cambodia)
9	MF	Khieng Menghour	1 June 2000 (aged 18)			(Football Federation of Cambodia)
19	MF	Khun Seng Thai				(Football Federation of Cambodia)
2	MF	Pich Sovannaroth				(Football Federation of Cambodia)
14	MF	Thunthean				(Football Federation of Cambodia)
15	MF	Heng Tina				(Football Federation of Cambodia)
3	FW	Soeuth Nava (Kapten)				(Football Federation of Cambodia)
11	FW	Our Phearun				(Football Federation of Cambodia)
16	FW	Tes Sambath	20 October 2000 (aged 17)			(Football Federation of Cambodia)
17	FW	Sieng Chanthea	9 September 2002 (aged 15)			(Football Federation of Cambodia) Bati Academy
18	FW	Tray Vicheth				(Football Federation of Cambodia)
20	FW	Sean Sopheaktra				(Football Federation of Cambodia)

=== Brunei ===
Head Coach: (Japan) Takao Fujiwara

No.	Pos.	Player	Date of birth (age)	Caps	Goals	Club
1	GK	AK Muhd Amirul Hakim PG Zulkarnain				(Football Association of Brunei Darussalam)
20	GK	Mohammad Haziq Hazwan Wahid				(Football Association of Brunei Darussalam)
2	DF	Muhammad Rahimin Abdul Ghani				(Football Association of Brunei Darussalam)
6	DF	Muhammad Wafi Aminuddin (Captain)				(Football Association of Brunei Darussalam)
21	DF	Muhammad Nazhan Zulkifle				(Football Association of Brunei Darussalam)
22	DF	Mohd Salleh @ Abdul Salam				(Football Association of Brunei Darussalam)
23	DF	Mohammad Hirzi Zulfaqar				(Football Association of Brunei Darussalam)
3	DF	Mohammad Azirul Asmadi				(Football Association of Brunei Darussalam)
4	DF	Muhammad Nazif Safwan Jaini				(Football Association of Brunei Darussalam)
5	DF	Muhammad Nur Aiman				(Football Association of Brunei Darussalam)
13	DF	Mohammad Azinur Rashiman				(Football Association of Brunei Darussalam)
8	MF	Muhd Firduas Fadzlullah Yahya				(Football Association of Brunei Darussalam)
12	MF	Mohamad Adi Shukry Salleh				(Football Association of Brunei Darussalam)
16	MF	Abdul Hariz Herman				(Football Association of Brunei Darussalam)
10	MF	Mohd Syami Fadhlillah				(Football Association of Brunei Darussalam)
14	MF	Muhammad Aqil Danish Aslam				(Football Association of Brunei Darussalam)
17	MF	Muhd Khairul Alimin Muhd Ali				(Football Association of Brunei Darussalam)
7	MF	Muhammad Hanif Farhan				(Football Association of Brunei Darussalam)
9	FW	Mohammad Hanif Aiman				(Football Association of Brunei Darussalam)
11	FW	Mohammad Alinur Rashimy Awang Jufri				(Football Association of Brunei Darussalam)
15	FW	Syazwan Hj Sahrin				(Football Association of Brunei Darussalam)
19	FW	Md Suhaily Syafiee Adullah Masrazni				(Football Association of Brunei Darussalam)
