= Julyano Pratama =

Indonesian footballer (born 2000)

Personal information
- Full name: Julyano Pratama Nono
- Date of birth: 10 July 2000 (age 26)
- Place of birth: Makassar, Indonesia
- Height: 1.84 m (6 ft 0 in)
- Position: Centre back

Youth career
- 2017–2018: SKO Ragunan
- 2019: Persela Lamongan

Senior career*
Years	Team	Apps	(Gls)
2020–2021	Persela Lamongan	0	(0)
2020	→ PSG Pati (loan)	0	(0)
2021	Persikabo 1973	2	(0)
2022	PSM Makassar	0	(0)
2022–2023	PSKC Cimahi	3	(0)
2023	Persikabo 1973	1	(0)
2023	Persekat Tegal	0	(0)
2023–2024	PSCS Cilacap	15	(0)
2024	Deltras	2	(0)
2025	Persikas Subang	9	(0)
2025–2026	Persikota Tangerang	10	(0)

International career^{‡}
2017–2018	Indonesia U19	1	(0)
Medal record
Men's football
Representing Indonesia
AFF U-19 Youth Championship
Third place	2017 Myanmar
Third place	2018 Indonesia	Team
- * Club domestic league appearances and goals as of 25 January 2026 ‡ National team caps and goals as of 19 August 2018

Julyano Pratama Nono (born 10 July 2000) is an Indonesian professional footballer who plays as a centre back.

== Club career ==
=== Persikabo 1973 ===
He was signed for Persikabo 1973 to play in Liga 1 in the 2021 season. Julyano made his first-team debut on 2 October 2021 as a substitute in a match against Bali United at the Gelora Bung Karno Madya Stadium, Jakarta.

== Career statistics ==
=== Club ===
As of 25 January 2026

Club	Season	League			Cup		Other		Total	
Club	Season	Division	Apps	Goals	Apps	Goals	Apps	Goals	Apps	Goals
Persela Lamongan	2020	Liga 1	0	0	0	0	0	0	0	0
PSG Pati (loan)	2020	Liga 2	0	0	0	0	0	0	0	0
Persikabo 1973	2021	Liga 1	2	0	0	0	1 (Note: Appearances in Menpora Cup)	0	3	0
PSM Makassar	2021	Liga 1	0	0	0	0	0	0	0	0
PSKC Cimahi	2022	Liga 2	3	0	0	0	0	0	3	0
Persikabo 1973	2022–23	Liga 1	1	0	0	0	0	0	1	0
Persekat Tegal	2023–24	Liga 2	0	0	0	0	0	0	0	0
PSCS Cilacap	2023–24	Liga 2	15	0	0	0	0	0	15	0
Deltras	2024–25	Liga 2	2	0	0	0	0	0	2	0
Persikas Subang	2024–25	Liga 2	9	0	0	0	0	0	9	0
Persikota Tangerang	2025–26	Liga Nusantara	10	0	0	0	0	0	10	0
Career total			42	0	0	0	1	0	43	0

== Honours ==
=== International ===
Indonesia U-19

- AFF U-19 Youth Championship third place: 2017, 2018
