= Resky Fandi =

Indonesian footballer

Personal information
- Full name: Resky Fandi Witriawan
- Date of birth: 6 September 1999 (age 27)
- Place of birth: Makassar, Indonesia
- Height: 1.73 m (5 ft 8 in)
- Position: Defensive midfielder

Team information
- Current team: PSM Makassar
- Number: 6

Youth career
- –2017: Asprov Sulawesi Barat
- 2019: Persija Jakarta

Senior career*
Years	Team	Apps	(Gls)
2018	Martapura	8	(0)
2019–2025	Persija Jakarta	74	(1)
2021	→ Dewa United (loan)	14	(0)
2022	→ PSIS Semarang (loan)	9	(0)
2025–	PSM Makassar	14	(0)

International career
2017–2018	Indonesia U19	7	(1)
Medal record
Men's football
Representing Indonesia
AFF U-19 Youth Championship
Third place	2017 Myanmar
Third place	2018 Indonesia	Team
- * Club domestic league appearances and goals as of 23 May 2026

Resky Fandi Witriawan (born 6 September 1999) is an Indonesian professional footballer who plays as a defensive midfielder for Super League club PSM Makassar.

== International career ==
On 31 May 2017, Resky made his debut against Brazil U20 as a substitute in the 2017 Toulon Tournament in France. And Resky is one of the players that strengthen Indonesia U19 in 2018 AFC U-19 Championship.

== Career statistics ==
=== Club ===
As of match played 23 May 2026

Club	Season	League			Cup		Other		Total	
Club	Season	Division	Apps	Goals	Apps	Goals	Apps	Goals	Apps	Goals
Martapura	2018	Liga 2	8	0	0	0	0	0	8	0
Persija Jakarta	2019	Liga 1	2	0	0	0	0	0	2	0
Persija Jakarta	2020	Liga 1	0	0	0	0	0	0	0	0
Persija Jakarta	2022–23	Liga 1	30	1	0	0	2 (Note: Appearances in Indonesia President's Cup)	0	32	1
Persija Jakarta	2023–24	Liga 1	32	0	0	0	0	0	32	0
Persija Jakarta	2024–25	Liga 1	10	0	0	0	2	0	12	0
Dewa United (loan)	2021	Liga 2	14	0	0	0	0	0	14	0
PSIS Semarang (loan)	2021–22	Liga 1	9	0	0	0	0	0	9	0
PSM Makassar	2025–26	Super League	12	0	0	0	0	0	12	0
Career total			117	1	0	0	4	0	121	1

== Honours ==
=== Club ===
Dewa United

- Liga 2 third place (play-offs): 2021

=== International ===
Indonesia U-19

- AFF U-19 Youth Championship third place: 2017, 2018
