= Witan Sulaeman =

Indonesian association football player

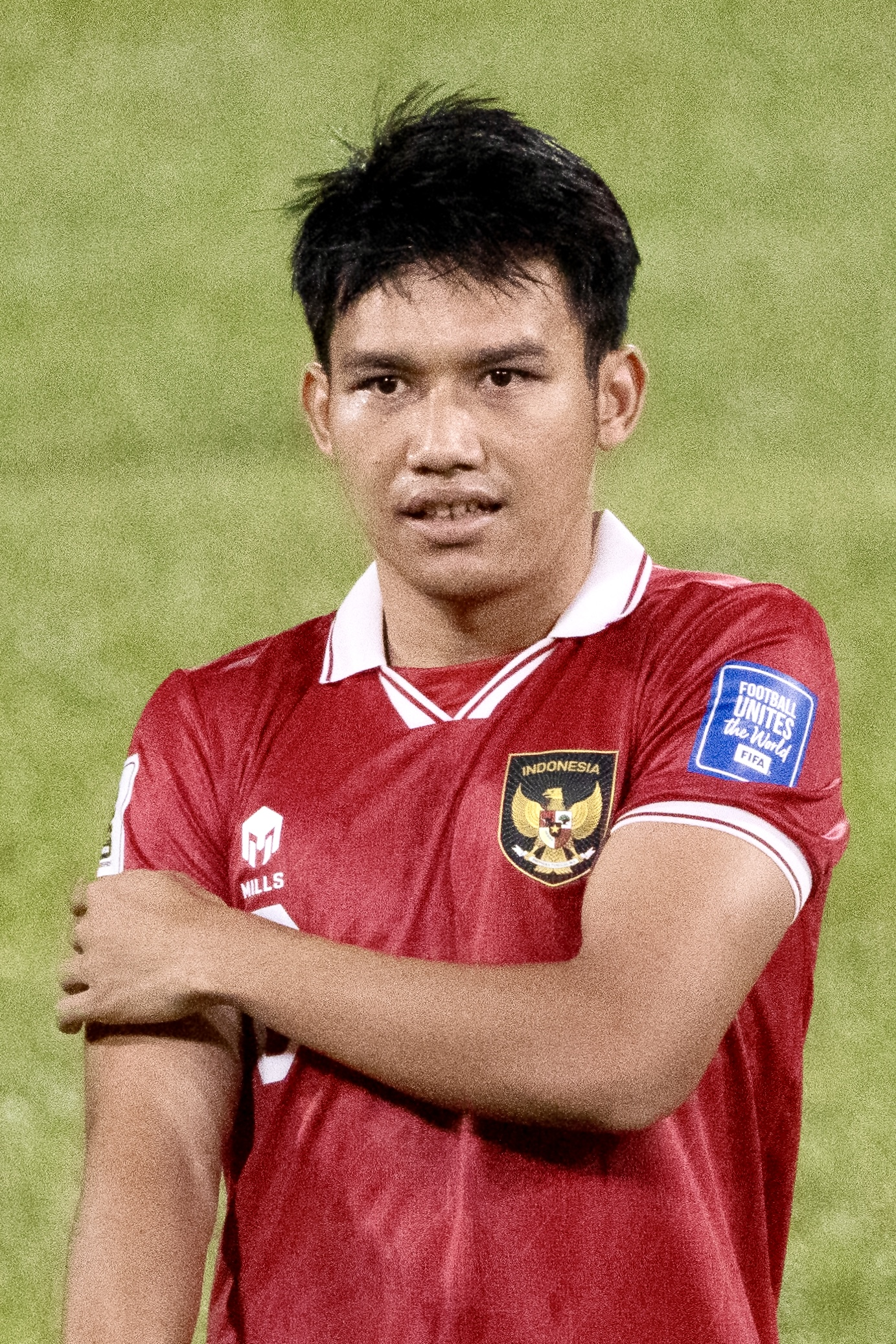
- Witan playing for Indonesia in 2023

Personal information
- Full name: Witan Sulaeman
- Date of birth: 8 October 2001 (age 25)
- Place of birth: Palu, Indonesia
- Height: 1.70 m (5 ft 7 in)
- Position: Winger

Team information
- Current team: Persija Jakarta
- Number: 8

Youth career
- 2013–2015: SSB Galara
- 2016–2019: SKO Ragunan

Senior career*
| Years | Team | Apps | (Gls) |
| 2019 | PSIM Yogyakarta | 7 | (0) |
| 2020–2021 | Radnik Surdulica | 5 | (0) |
| 2021–2022 | Lechia Gdańsk | 0 | (0) |
| 2022 | → Senica (loan) | 8 | (2) |
| 2022 | Trenčín | 10 | (1) |
| 2023– | Persija Jakarta | 82 | (7) |
| 2024 | → Bhayangkara (loan) | 10 | (1) |

International career^{‡}
| 2017–2020 | Indonesia U19 | 26 | (8) |
| 2019–2024 | Indonesia U23 | 39 | (10) |
| 2021– | Indonesia | 49 | (9) |
Medal record
Men's football
Representing Indonesia
AFF U-19 Youth Championship
| Third place | 2017 Myanmar |
| Third place | 2018 Indonesia | Team |
Southeast Asian Games
| Silver medal – second place | 2019 Philippines | Team |
| Bronze medal – third place | 2021 Vietnam | Team |
| Gold medal – first place | 2023 Cambodia | Team |
AFF U-22 Youth Championship
| Winner | 2019 Cambodia | Team |
AFF Championship
| Runner-up | 2020 Singapore | Team |
- * Club domestic league appearances and goals as of 8 November 2026 ‡ National team caps and goals as of 15 November 2024

Witan Sulaeman (born 8 October 2001) is an Indonesian professional footballer who plays as a winger for Indonesian Super League club Persija Jakarta and the Indonesia national team.

A youth product of Ragunan Sports School, Witan started his professional career with PSIM Yogyakarta. He joined Serbian club Radnik Surdulica in July 2020, becoming the first Indonesian to play in a Serbian league. In 2021 he moved to Polish side Lechia Gdansk before being loaned to Slovak side Senica in 2022. He moved to Trenčín in the same year. The following year, Witan returned to Indonesia by joining Persija Jakarta.

Witan has represented Indonesia since U19 level. He has represented his side at two Southeast Asian Games and led his side to the final of the 2020 AFF Championship. Witan took part in Indonesia's qualification for the 2023 Asian Cup by scoring two goals.

== Club career ==
=== PSIM Yogyakarta ===
On 17 August 2019, Witan signed his first professional contract at the age of 17 years old with Liga 2 side PSIM Yogyakarta. He made his first-team debut for PSIM Yogyakarta at age of 17 years old when he was part of the starting lineup of a 2019 Liga 2 match against Persiba Balikpapan on 22 August 2019, in which PSIM won.

=== Radnik Surdulica ===
At the age of 18, Witan joined Serbian SuperLiga club Radnik Surdulica in February 2020 on a three-and-a-half-year deal. However, the season was soon suspended as a result of the COVID-19 pandemic for a period of 2 1/2 months, during which he returned to Indonesia. He finally made his professional debut on 14 June 2020, coming on for Bogdan Stamenković during a 4–2 SuperLiga defeat to Radnički Niš.

=== Lechia Gdańsk ===
On 1 September 2021, Witan joined Polish club Lechia Gdańsk on a two-year contract. Witan joined shortly after his international teammate Egy Maulana departured to Senica in Slovakia. Three days later, Witan made his Lechia Gdańsk debut in a friendly match against Jeziorak Iława as a substitute for Kacper Sezonienko in the 73rd minute.

He made his league debut for Lechia Gdańsk. However, he did not strengthen the main team, but for the reserve team, Lechia Gdańsk II. when he was part of the starting lineup of a IV liga match against MKS Władysławowo on 11 September, in which Lechia won.

On 26 July 2022, it is announced that Witan and Lechia Gdańsk both agreed to mutually terminate his contract.

==== FK Senica (loan) ====
On 21 January 2022, Witan joined Slovak Super Liga club Senica on loan until the end of the season. On 12 February 2022, Witan made his league debut playing full 90-minutes against league giants Slovan Bratislava, as his team suffered 0–5 defeat.

Witan made his first goal for his club at Slovak Cup winning game against SV Sasona Arena. In the quarter final of Slovak Cup, against FK Pohronie, he gave one assist and one goal for the winning match.

=== Trenčín ===
On 9 August 2022, Slovak club AS Trenčín announced that they had signed Witan on a two-year contract. On 13 August 2022, Witan made his debut, coming on as a 73rd-minute substitute for Lucas Demitra in a goal-less league draw against Ružomberok.

On 24 August 2022, Witan scored his first and second goal for Trenčín during a record-setting 14–0 victory against Slovan Hlohovec in the Slovak Cup.

=== Persija Jakarta ===
On 31 January 2023, Witan joined Liga 1 side Persija on a three-and-a-half-year contract. Witan made his league debut on 12 February in a 2–0 home win against Arema at the Patriot Candrabhaga Stadium, Bekasi.

On 5 April, he scored his first league goal in a 0–1 away win against Persebaya Surabaya. He also continued his good form in April with give assists an opening goal by Michael Krmenčík, whilst also scored his second league goal for the club in a 5–0 win against PSS Sleman.

With this victory, Persija is assured to finish in runner-up in the final standings of the 2022–23 Liga 1. He contributed in 10 league appearances with 2 goals and 1 assist for the rest of 2022–23 season.

==== Bhayangkara (loan) ====
On 14 November 2023, Witan joined Bhayangkara FC on a loan until the end of the season.

== International career ==
At the age of 16, Witan made his international debut with Indonesia U19 in the 2017 Toulon Tournament on 31 May 2017 against Brazil U20 with a score of 1–0 defeat. Later that year he scored a brace in an 8–0 win over Brunei at the 2017 AFF U-18 Youth Championship. He also scored in the third-place match against Myanmar.

At the 2018 AFC U-19 Championship held in Indonesia, Witan scored two goals in a group stage win over Chinese Taipei before scoring the lone goal in a 1–0 victory over the United Arab Emirates to lead his team to the quarterfinals for the first time in 40 years. Witan was part of the Indonesia under-23 team that won silver in the 2019 Southeast Asian Games in the Philippines.

He received a call to join the senior Indonesia national football team in May 2021. He earned his first senior cap in a 25 May 2021 friendly match in Dubai against Afghanistan. On 11 October 2021, he made first international goal against Chinese Taipei in a 2023 AFC Asian Cup qualification – play-off round leg 2, in which Indonesia won 3–0.

On 12 December 2021, Witan scored a goal in a 2020 AFF Championship game against Laos. On 22 December 2021, Witan scored again against Singapore in the first leg of semi-final. On 14 June 2022, Witan scored a brace against Nepal in a 7–0 win in the 2023 AFC Asian Cup qualification. Witan was again called up for the Indonesia senior team for the 2022 AFF Championship. He scored a goal against Cambodia at the group stage on 23 December 2022.

== Personal life ==
In the midst of busy following the training camp with the Indonesia national team, On 29 May 2022, at the age of 20, Witan married his girlfriend, Rismahani. Witan officially married Rismahani in a wedding ceremony held in Palu, Central Sulawesi.

== Career statistics ==
=== Club ===
As of match played 15 March 2026

| Club | Season | League | | | Cup (Note: Includes Slovak Cup) | | Continental | | Other | | Total | |
| Club | Season | Division | Apps | Goals | Apps | Goals | Apps | Goals | Apps | Goals | Apps | Goals |
|---|---|---|---|---|---|---|---|---|---|---|---|---|
| PSIM Yogyakarta | 2019 | Liga 2 | 7 | 0 | — | | — | | — | | 7 | 0 |
| Radnik Surdulica | 2019–20 | Serbian SuperLiga | 2 | 0 | 0 | 0 | — | | — | | 2 | 0 |
| Radnik Surdulica | 2020–21 | Serbian SuperLiga | 3 | 0 | 0 | 0 | — | | — | | 3 | 0 |
| Radnik Surdulica | Total | | 5 | 0 | 0 | 0 | — | | — | | 5 | 0 |
| Lechia Gdańsk | 2021–22 | Ekstraklasa | 0 | 0 | 0 | 0 | — | | — | | 0 | 0 |
| Lechia Gdańsk II | 2021–22 | IV liga | 4 | 0 | 0 | 0 | — | | — | | 4 | 0 |
| Senica (loan) | 2021–22 | Fortuna liga | 8 | 2 | 4 | 2 | — | | — | | 12 | 4 |
| Trenčín | 2022–23 | Fortuna liga | 10 | 1 | 4 | 3 | — | | 3 (Note: Appearances in Tipsport liga) | 1 | 17 | 5 |
| Persija Jakarta | 2022–23 | Liga 1 | 10 | 2 | 0 | 0 | — | | 0 | 0 | 10 | 2 |
| Persija Jakarta | 2023–24 | Liga 1 | 18 | 3 | 0 | 0 | — | | 0 | 0 | 18 | 3 |
| Persija Jakarta | 2024–25 | Liga 1 | 28 | 1 | 0 | 0 | — | | 4 (Note: Appearances in Indonesia President's Cup.) | 0 | 32 | 1 |
| Persija Jakarta | 2025–26 | Super League | 16 | 1 | 0 | 0 | — | | 0 | 0 | 16 | 1 |
| Bhayangkara (loan) | 2023–24 | Liga 1 | 10 | 1 | 0 | 0 | — | | 0 | 0 | 10 | 1 |
| Career total | | | 116 | 11 | 8 | 5 | 0 | 0 | 7 | 1 | 131 | 17 |

=== International ===
As of match played 15 November 2024

Appearances and goals by national team and year
| National team | Year | Apps | Goals |
|---|---|---|---|
| Indonesia | 2021 | 15 | 4 |
| Indonesia | 2022 | 9 | 3 |
| Indonesia | 2023 | 11 | 2 |
| Indonesia | 2024 | 14 | 0 |
| Total | | 49 | 9 |

As of match played 10 September 2024
Scores and results list Indonesia's goal tally first, score column indicates score after each Witan goal.

List of international goals scored by Witan Sulaeman
| No. | Date | Venue | Cap | Opponent | Score | Result | Competition |
|---|---|---|---|---|---|---|---|
| 1 | 11 October 2021 | Buriram Stadium, Buriram, Thailand | 6 | Chinese Taipei | 3–0 | 3–0 | 2023 AFC Asian Cup qualification |
| 2 | 25 November 2021 | Emirhan Sports Complex, Antalya, Turkey | 8 | Myanmar | 3–0 | 4–1 | Friendly |
| 3 | 12 December 2021 | Bishan Stadium, Bishan, Singapore | 10 | Laos | 3–1 | 5–1 | 2020 AFF Championship |
| 4 | 22 December 2021 | National Stadium, Kallang, Singapore | 13 | Singapore | 1–0 | 1–1 | 2020 AFF Championship |
| 5 | 14 June 2022 | Jaber Al-Ahmad International Stadium, Kuwait City, Kuwait | 19 | Nepal | 2–0 | 7–0 | 2023 AFC Asian Cup qualification |
| 6 | 14 June 2022 | Jaber Al-Ahmad International Stadium, Kuwait City, Kuwait | 19 | Nepal | 6–0 | 7–0 | 2023 AFC Asian Cup qualification |
| 7 | 23 December 2022 | Gelora Bung Karno Stadium, Jakarta, Indonesia | 22 | Cambodia | 2–1 | 2–1 | 2022 AFF Championship |
| 8 | 28 March 2023 | Patriot Candrabhaga Stadium, Bekasi, Indonesia | 29 | Burundi | 1–0 | 2–2 | Friendly |
| 9 | 17 October 2023 | Hassanal Bolkiah National Stadium, Bandar Seri Begawan, Brunei | 33 | Brunei | 4–0 | 6–0 | 2026 FIFA World Cup qualification |

== Honours ==
Indonesia U19

- AFF U-19 Youth Championship third place: 2017, 2018

Indonesia U23

- AFF U-22 Youth Championship: 2019
- Southeast Asian Games (silver) Silver medal: 2019
- Southeast Asian Games (bronze) Bronze medal: 2021
- Southeast Asian Games (gold) Gold medal: 2023

Indonesia

- AFF Championship runner-up: 2020

Individual

- 2020 AFF Championship: Team of the Tournament
- Southeast Asian Games Top scorer: 2021
