= Rafli Mursalim =

Indonesian association football player

Personal information
- Full name: Muhammad Rafli Mursalim
- Date of birth: 5 March 1999 (age 27)
- Place of birth: Tangerang, Indonesia
- Height: 1.79 m (5 ft 10 in)
- Position: Striker

Youth career
- 2006–2013: Villa 2000
- 2016–2017: PP Al As' Ariyah

Senior career*
Years	Team	Apps	(Gls)
2018–2019	Mitra Kukar	22	(4)
2020–2022	Persija Jakarta	4	(0)
2020	→ Sulut United (loan)	0	(0)
2021	→ Dewa United (loan)	0	(0)
2021	→ PSG Pati (loan)	3	(0)
2022	Gresik United	3	(1)
2023–2024	Nagaworld	5	(1)
2024–2025	Persiku Kudus	3	(0)

International career^{‡}
2017–2018	Indonesia U19	15	(11)
2019	Indonesia U23	2	(0)
Medal record
Men's football
Representing Indonesia
AFF U-19 Youth Championship
Third place	2017 Myanmar
Third place	2018 Indonesia	Team
- * Club domestic league appearances and goals as of 9 February 2025 ‡ National team caps and goals as of 14 July 2019

Muhammad Rafli Mursalim (born 5 March 1999) is an Indonesian professional footballer who plays as a striker.

== Club career ==
=== Mitra Kukar ===
Was born in Tangerang, Rafli started his professional career with Mitra Kukar in 2018. He made his professional debut on 11 May 2018 in a match against Bali United at the Aji Imbut Stadium, Tenggarong. Rafli made 22 league appearances and scored 4 goals for Mitra Kukar.

=== Persija Jakarta ===
In 2020, Rafli signed a contract with Indonesian Liga 1 club Persija Jakarta.

==== Sulut United (loan) ====
He was signed for Sulut United to play in the Liga 2 in the 2020 season, on loan from Persija Jakarta. This season was suspended on 27 March 2020 due to the COVID-19 pandemic. The season was abandoned and was declared void on 20 January 2021.

==== Dewa United (loan) ====
He was signed for Dewa United to play in the Liga 2 in the 2021 season, on loan from Persija Jakarta.

==== PSG Pati (loan) ====
In 2021, Rafli signed a contract with Indonesian Liga 2 club PSG Pati on loan from Persija Jakarta. He made his league debut on 4 October against PSCS Cilacap at the Manahan Stadium, Surakarta. Rafli played three times for PSG Pati in 2021 Liga 2 without scoring a goal.

=== Gresik United ===
Ahead of 2022–23 season, Rafli signed a contract with Gresik United for a free transfer. Rafli made his league debut on 5 September 2022 in a 1–0 lose against Bekasi City. On 17 September 2022, Rafli scored his first league goal for Gresik United, with one goal in a 2–2 draw over Persela Lamongan. He picked up his first red card in a 0–0 draw against PSCS Cilacap on 23 September 2022. He made only three league appearances and scored one goal with Gresik United during the 2021–22 season, because Liga 2 was suspended due to a tragedy.

=== Nagaworld ===
On 19 July 2023, Rafli went abroad for the first time, and signed a contract with Cambodian Premier League club Nagaworld. Rafli chose 9 as his squad number. On 27 August 2023, he scored his debut goal against league champions, Phnom Penh Crown in a 2–3 lost.

== International career ==
He made his debut for Indonesia U-19 in the 2017 AFF U-19 Youth Championship on 7 September 2017 against Philippines U-19. Rafli success made his first international goals for Indonesia, where he scoring one goal in the 90+1 minute from a penalty kick.

== Career statistics ==
=== Club ===
As of 9 February 2025.

Club	Season	League			Cup (Note: Includes Piala Indonesia)		Continental		Other (Note: Appearances in Indonesia President's Cup)		Total	
Club	Season	Division	Apps	Goals	Apps	Goals	Apps	Goals	Apps	Goals	Apps	Goals
Mitra Kukar	2018	Liga 1	4	0	1	1	–		0	0	5	1
Mitra Kukar	2019	Liga 2	18	4	0	0	–		3	0	21	4
Mitra Kukar	Total		22	4	1	1	–		3	0	26	5
Persija Jakarta	2020	Liga 1	0	0	0	0	–		0	0	0	0
Persija Jakarta	2021–22	Liga 1	4	0	0	0	–		0	0	4	0
Persija Jakarta	2022–23	Liga 1	0	0	0	0	–		2	0	2	0
Persija Jakarta	Total		4	0	0	0	–		2	0	6	0
Sulut United (loan)	2020	Liga 2	0	0	0	0	–		0	0	0	0
Dewa United (loan)	2021	Liga 2	0	0	0	0	–		0	0	0	0
PSG Pati (loan)	2021	Liga 2	3	0	0	0	–		0	0	3	0
Gresik United	2022–23	Liga 2	3	1	0	0	–		0	0	3	1
Nagaworld	2023–24	Cambodian Premier League	5	1	0	0	–		0	0	5	1
Persiku Kudus	2024–25	Liga 2	3	0	0	0	–		0	0	3	0
Career total			40	6	1	1	0	0	5	0	46	7

== Honours ==
=== International ===
Indonesia U-19

- AFF U-19 Youth Championship third place: 2017, 2018
