= Muhammad Iqbal (footballer) =

Indonesian footballer

Personal information
- Full name: Muhammad Iqbal Batubara
- Date of birth: 27 October 2000 (age 26)
- Place of birth: Padang Pariaman, Indonesia
- Height: 1.69 m (5 ft 7 in)
- Position: Midfielder

Team information
- Current team: PSIM Yogyakarta
- Number: 6

Youth career
- 2015–2018: PPLP West Sumatra

Senior career*
Years	Team	Apps	(Gls)
2018	Persika Karawang	2	(0)
2019	PSMS Medan	6	(0)
2021	Cheongju	3	(0)
2022	Persita Tangerang	3	(0)
2023–2024	Persebaya Surabaya	25	(4)
2024–2025	Semen Padang	13	(0)
2025–	PSIM Yogyakarta	13	(1)

International career^{‡}
2017–2018	Indonesia U19	12	(3)
Medal record
Men's football
Representing Indonesia
AFF U-19 Youth Championship
Third place	2017 Myanmar
- * Club domestic league appearances and goals as of 22 May 2026 ‡ National team caps and goals as of 2 November 2017

Muhammad Iqbal Batubara (born 27 October 2000) is an Indonesian professional footballer who plays as a midfielder for Super League club PSIM Yogyakarta.

== Club career ==
=== Persika Karawang ===
Muhammad Iqbal joined Persika Karawang on 23 April 2018. He was brought in by Ricky Nelson to navigate 2018 Liga 2. He made 2 league appearances for Persika Karawang.

=== PSMS Medan ===
Iqbal joined PSMS Medan to add to the squad list of young players owned by the team nicknamed the "Ayam Kinantan" to navigate the 2019 Liga 2. He made 6 league appearances for PSMS Medan.

=== Cheongju FC ===
On 15 September 2021, Iqbal made his debut in a match against Gimpo Citizen, coming on as a substitute in the 84th minute for Kwon Seung-cheol. He made 3 league appearances for Cheongju.

=== Persita Tangerang ===
He was signed for Persita Tangerang to play in the Liga 1 in the 2021-22 middle season. Iqbal made his league debut on 7 January 2022 in a match against Persib Bandung at the Ngurah Rai Stadium, Denpasar. Lack of playing minutes, made him decide to leave the club. He contributed only 3 appearances for Persita.

=== Persebaya Surabaya ===
On 3 January 2023, Iqbal signed a contract with Liga 1 club Persebaya Surabaya from Persita Tangerang. Iqbal made his league debut for the club in a 5–0 win against his former club Persita Tangerang, coming on as a substituted Sho Yamamoto on 18 January 2023. Iqbal scored his first goal league for the club, scoring a brace and provided an assist for Altalariq Ballah in the 49th minute in a 3–3 draw over Persis Solo on 8 April. On 11 April, he scored the winning goal in a Super East Java derby against Arema in a 1–0 win.

=== PSIM Yogyakarta ===
On 28 June 2025, Iqbal officially signed with Liga 1 club PSIM Yogyakarta.

== International career ==
On 31 May 2017, Iqbal made his debut against Brazil U20 in the 2017 Toulon Tournament in France. And Iqbal is one of the players that strengthen Indonesia U19 in 2017 AFF U-18 Youth Championship. He scored his first International goal at 2017 AFF U-18 Youth Championship in a 9–0 win against Philippines U-19.

== Personal life ==
He is the older brother of Ikhsan Zikrak, who also a footballer and currently plays as a midfielder for Borneo Samarinda. Syamsuddin Batubara is his father as well as his first coach to start his career as a footballer. his father is the founder of the Soccer School of Football Association of Kudugantiang in Padang Pariaman.

== Career statistics ==
=== Club ===
As of match played 22 May 2026

Club	Season	League			Cup		Continental		Other		Total	
Club	Season	Division	Apps	Goals	Apps	Goals	Apps	Goals	Apps	Goals	Apps	Goals
Persika Karawang	2018	Liga 2	2	0	0	0	–		0	0	2	0
PSMS Medan	2019	Liga 2	6	0	0	0	–		0	0	6	0
Cheongju	2021	K3 League	3	0	0	0	–		0	0	3	0
Persita Tangerang	2021	Liga 1	3	0	0	0	–		0	0	3	0
Persebaya Surabaya	2022–23	Liga 1	9	3	0	0	–		0	0	9	3
Persebaya Surabaya	2023–24	Liga 1	16	1	0	0	–		0	0	16	1
Semen Padang	2024–25	Liga 1	13	0	0	0	–		0	0	13	0
PSIM Yogyakarta	2025–26	Super League	13	1	0	0	–		0	0	13	1
Career total			65	5	0	0	0	0	0	0	65	5

== Honours ==
=== International ===
Indonesia U-19

- AFF U-19 Youth Championship third place: 2017

Individual

- Super League Best Goal: 2025–26
