= Mohd Rafdi Abdul Rashid =

Malaysian footballer

Rafdi Rashid
Personal information
- Full name: Mohd Rafdi Abdul Rashid
- Date of birth: 21 January 1977 (age 49)
- Place of birth: Kedah, Malaysia
- Positions: Midfielder; striker

Senior career*
Years	Team	Apps	(Gls)
1998–2000	Kedah FA		(24)
2001–2002	Perak FA		(0)
2003–2004	Kedah FA		(0)
2005–2006	Perlis FA		(2)
2007–2008	Sarawak FA		
- * Club domestic league appearances and goals

Rafdi Rashid (born 21 January 1977) is a former Malaysian footballer.

The Kedah-born striker has been playing for several team in his career such Kedah, Perlis and Perak. He played for national Olympic 2000 team and had short stint with main national senior team.

He was considered a hero for Kedah and Perak fans, after getting their team to final match of Malaysia Cup and eventually becomes a hot prospect. After getting serious injury when playing with Perak, he has mutually terminate he contract and signed with Sarawak FA.

== Personal life ==
His younger sister Nurrashidah Rashid is currently a Malaysian national sepaktakraw player. His younger brother Akhyar is also a professional footballer.

== Honours ==
Perak

- Malaysia Cup runner-up: 2001

Kedah

- Malaysia Cup runner-up: 2004
