= Abdul Wadud Ramli =

Bruneian footballer

Abdul Wadud
Personal information
- Full name: Abdul Wadud bin Ramli
- Date of birth: 18 May 1999 (age 27)
- Place of birth: Brunei
- Position: Midfielder

Team information
- Current team: MS PPDB
- Number: 18

Senior career*
Years	Team	Apps	(Gls)
2017	Tabuan Muda 'A'		(0)
2018–	MS PPDB		(2)

International career^{‡}
2017	Brunei U19	8	(1)
2022	Brunei U23	3	(0)
2022–	Brunei	6	(0)
- * Club domestic league appearances and goals as of 13 March 2025 ‡ National team caps and goals as of 20 November 2025

Abdul Wadud bin Ramli (born 21 May 2002) is a Bruneian footballer who plays as a midfielder for the football team of the Royal Brunei Police Force playing in the Brunei Super League as well as the Brunei national football team.

== Club career ==
Wadud was part of the Brunei under-17s that played in the 2017–18 Brunei Super League as Tabuan Muda 'A'. After his Tabuan Muda age group disbanded, he moved to the football team of the Royal Brunei Police Force Sports Council, and has been playing there since the 2018–19 season.

Wadud and his team reached the final of the 2018–19 Brunei FA Cup where they were beaten 2–1 by Kota Ranger.

Wadud scored his first league goal for MS PPDB in a 6–0 win against IKLS-MB5 on 5 July 2023.

== International career ==
=== Youth ===
Wadud's first youth international tournament was at the 2017 AFF U-18 Youth Championship in September when in the first game against the Philippines, he scored the winner for the Young Wasps playing at left-back in a 3–2 victory. It was the only high point for Brunei as they were subsequently beaten by the likes of Vietnam, Myanmar and Indonesia by seven-goal margins or more. The following month, the same team arrived in Paju, South Korea for the 2018 AFC U-19 Championship qualification where they were grouped with the hosts as well as Indonesia, Malaysia and Timor-Leste. Wadud was ever-present at left-back as the Young Wasps managed to draw 2–2 with Timor-Leste after losing all of their previous matches.

It was not until February 2022 when Wadud was back in the Tabuan Muda fold, being selected for the 2022 AFF U-23 Championship that was held in Cambodia. He started all three matches in central midfield as Brunei suffered defeats against the hosts, Timor-Leste, and the Philippines.

=== Senior ===
Wadud's first involvement with the full national team was when he was selected for a friendly against Malaysia on 28 May 2022 as an unused substitute in a 4–0 loss to Harimau Malaya.

In November 2024, Wadud was selected for the national team to play at an away friendly against Russia in Krasnodar. He made his national team debut as a second half substitute, replacing Shafie Effendy in a 11–0 defeat.

Wadud was retained in the Wasps' squad to face Lebanon in Qatar for the first group game of the 2027 AFC Asian Cup qualifying on 25 March 2025. He replaced Hanif Farhan Azman at the hour mark but Brunei were beaten 5–0 at the end of the game.

Wadud made two further substitute appearances when the Wasps played Sri Lanka on 5 June in a 1–0 defeat in Bangkok, and also the 2027 Asian Cup qualifier against Bhutan at Hassanal Bolkiah National Stadium on 10 June, this time prevailing 2–1. Another substitute appearance came against Yemen when Brunei hosted them for a 2027 Asian Cup qualifying match on 9 October, in a 0–2 defeat. In a further Asian Cup qualification fixture the following November, Wadud took the field in the last few minutes against Lebanon on 18 November in a 0–3 loss.
