= Hanis Sagara Putra =

Indonesian footballer (born 1999)

Hanis Sagara
Personal information
- Full name: Hanis Sagara Putra
- Date of birth: 8 September 1999 (age 27)
- Place of birth: Bojonegoro, Indonesia
- Height: 1.75 m (5 ft 9 in)
- Position: Forward

Team information
- Current team: De Red
- Number: 22

Youth career
- 2005–2015: Indonesia Muda Soccer School
- 2015–2017: Persibo Bojonegoro

Senior career*
Years	Team	Apps	(Gls)
2017–2021	Bali United	5	(0)
2020	→ PSMS Medan (loan)	0	(0)
2021–2022	Persikabo 1973	14	(2)
2022	Arema	13	(0)
2023–2024	Persita Tangerang	26	(1)
2024–2025	Madura United	19	(0)
2026–	De Red	0	(0)

International career
2017–2018	Indonesia U19	18	(6)
2021	Indonesia U23	4	(2)
2021–2022	Indonesia	5	(0)
Medal record
Men's football
Representing Indonesia
AFF U-19 Youth Championship
Third place	2017 Myanmar
Third place	2018 Indonesia	Team
AFF Championship
Runner-up	2020 Singapore	Team
- * Club domestic league appearances and goals as of 10 May 2025

Hanis Sagara Putra (born 8 September 1999) is an Indonesian professional footballer who plays as a forward for Championship club De Red.

== Club career ==
=== Bali United ===
On 4 December 2017, Hanis signed a four-year contract with Bali United. He made his debut on 16 January 2018, against Tampines Rovers in the playoff AFC Champions League. He signed in during the 84th minute to substitute Irfan Bachdim. And Hanis made his first goal in his debut on added time second half.

==== PSMS Medan (loan) ====
He was signed for PSMS Medan to play in Liga 2 in the 2020 season, on loan from Bali United. This season was suspended on 27 March 2020 due to the COVID-19 pandemic. The season was abandoned and was declared void on 20 January 2021.

=== Persikabo 1973 ===
In 2021, Hanis Sagara signed a contract with Indonesian Liga 1 club Persikabo 1973. He made his professional debut for the club, in a 2–2 draw against Persik Kediri on 17 September 2021, he also scored his first goal for Persikabo, where he scored with a header in the 23rd minutes.

=== Arema ===
On 11 April 2022, Sagara is officially introduced as Arema player and signed a year contract. On 7 June 2022, Sagara made his debut and scored his first goal for Arema in a 4–0 friendly match win against RANS Nusantara. On 24 July 2022, he made his league debut in a 0–3 lost against Borneo Samarinda as a substitute in the early minutes of the second half.

=== Persita Tangerang ===
Hanis Sagara became Persita Tangerang in half of the 2022–23 Liga 1. Sagara made his debut on 18 January 2023 in a match against Persebaya Surabaya at the Indomilk Arena, Tangerang.

== International career ==
On 31 May 2017, Sagara made his debut against Brazil U20 in the 2017 Toulon Tournament in France. And on June 6, in a match 2017 Toulon Tournament against Scotland U20, Sagara made his first international goal. And Sagara is one of the players that strengthen Indonesia's U19 in the 2018 AFC U-19 Championship.

On 19 October 2021, Sagara made his debut in Indonesia U23 against Tajikistan U23 and he scored a goal to make it 1-1. Sagara made his international debut for the national team on 19 December 2021, in a 2020 AFF Championship game against Malaysia, coming on as a substitute for Kushedya Hari Yudo in the 90+3 minute.

== Career statistics ==
=== Club ===
As of 10 May 2025

Club	Season	League			Cup (Note: Includes Piala Indonesia)		Continental (Note: Appearances in AFC Cup) (Note: Appearances in AFC Champions League)		Other (Note: Appearances in Piala Presiden)		Total	
Club	Season	Division	Apps	Goals	Apps	Goals	Apps	Goals	Apps	Goals	Apps	Goals
Bali United	2018	Liga 1	5	0	1	0	3	1	0	0	9	1
Bali United	2019	Liga 1	0	0	0	0	—		0	0	0	0
Bali United	2020	Liga 1	0	0	0	0	—		0	0	0	0
Bali United	Total		5	0	1	0	3	1	0	0	9	1
PSMS Medan (loan)	2020	Liga 2	0	0	0	0	—		0	0	0	0
Persikabo 1973	2021–22	Liga 1	14	2	0	0	—		3 (Note: Appearances in Menpora Cup)	0	17	2
Arema	2022–23	Liga 1	13	0	0	0	—		6	0	19	0
Persita Tangerang	2022–23	Liga 1	9	0	0	0	—		0	0	9	0
Persita Tangerang	2023–24	Liga 1	17	1	0	0	—		0	0	17	1
Persita Tangerang	Total		26	1	0	0	—		0	0	26	1
Madura United	2024–25	Liga 1	19	0	0	0	3 (Note: Appearances in AFC Challenge League)	0	0	0	22	0
Career total			77	3	1	0	6	1	9	0	93	4

=== International ===
As of match played 27 January 2022

Appearances and goals by national team and year
National team	Year	Apps	Goals
Indonesia	2021	3	0
Indonesia	2022	2	0
Total		5	0

International under-23 goals

Goal	Date	Venue	Opponent	Score	Result	Competition
1	19 October 2021	Pamir Stadium, Dushanbe, Tajikistan	Tajikistan	1–1	2–1	Friendly
2	22 October 2021	Hisor Central Stadium, Hisor, Tajikistan	Nepal	1–0	2–0	Friendly

== Honours ==
=== Club ===
Arema

- Piala Presiden: 2022

=== International ===
Indonesia U-19

- AFF U-19 Youth Championship third place: 2017, 2018

Indonesia

- AFF Championship runner-up: 2020
