= Hadi Fayyadh =

Malaysian footballer (born 2000)

Personal information
- Full name: Muhammad Hadi Fayyadh bin Abdul Razak
- Date of birth: 22 January 2000 (age 26)
- Place of birth: Kuala Lumpur, Malaysia
- Height: 1.86 m (6 ft 1 in)
- Position: Forward

Team information
- Current team: Vencedor Mie United
- Number: 45

Youth career
- 2012–2014: Malaysia Pahang Sports School
- 2015: Frenz United
- 2016: Johor Darul Ta'zim III

Senior career*
Years	Team	Apps	(Gls)
2016–2018	Johor Darul Ta'zim II	27	(4)
2017	Johor Darul Ta'zim	1	(0)
2019–2022	Fagiano Okayama	0	(0)
2021–2022	→ Azul Claro Numazu (loan)	3	(0)
2023–2024	Perak	11	(0)
2023	→ PDRM (loan)	9	(0)
2024–2026	PDRM	21	(0)
2026–	Vencedor Mie United	6	(2)

International career^{‡}
2015–2016	Malaysia U17	3	(4)
2018	Malaysia U18	6	(4)
2017–2018	Malaysia U19	23	(8)
2018–2022	Malaysia U23	16	(3)
2026–	Malaysia	1	(0)
Medal record
Men's football
Representing Malaysia
AFF U-19 Youth Championship
First place	2018 Indonesia
Second place	2017 Myanmar
- * Club domestic league appearances and goals as of 28 September 2026 ‡ National team caps and goals as of 19 August 2026

Muhammad Hadi Fayyadh bin Abdul Razak (born 22 January 2000) is a Malaysian professional footballer who plays as a forward for Tōkai Soccer League club Vencedor Mie United and the Malaysia national team.

== Club career ==
=== Johor Darul Ta'zim ===
He made his first-team debut by coming on as a substitute on the 67th minute against T-Team (currently Terengganu II). He became the first player born after 2000 to make a competitive debut in Malaysian Super League. Hadi went to a one-week trial with Japanese J2 League club Roasso Kumamoto in early August 2018. On 2 September 2018, Johor DT confirmed that they have released Hadi Fayyadh because of his eagerness to go to Japan.

=== Fagiano Okayama ===
Hadi became the first Malaysian to play in the J2 League after he joined Fagiano Okayama on 21 December 2018. But he never made any appearances with the club.

==== Loan to Azul Claro Numazu ====
In December 2020, Hadi was sent on loan to J3 League side Azul Claro Numazu which was initially planned to end on 31 January 2022. He was injured during practice on 23 March 2021 and was diagnosed with anterior cruciate ligament on the right knee. On 23 July 2021, he returned to Azul Claro Numazu after undergoing medical treatment and rehabilitation with his original club, Fagiano Okayama. In December 2021, Azul Claro Numazu announced that Hadi's loan period will be extended until 1 January 2023.

On 21 April 2022, Hadi Fayyadh made his debut with J3 League side Azul Claro Numazu in a 2–0 win over Vanraure Hachinohe in the J3 League. Hadi Fayyadh made his team debut after got subs in 84th minute replacing Ryo Watanabe. He also officially became the first Malaysian to play in an official J League match.

==== Loan to PDRM FC ====
On 20 July 2023, Hadi Fayyadh joined PDRM on a 6 months loan from Perak FC.

=== PDRM FC ===
On 11 September 2024, Hadi Fayyadh joined PDRM on free transfer after leaving Perak.

On 21 September 2024, Hadi made his assists with PDRM in a 1–0 win against Sabah.

=== Vencedor Mie United ===
On 22 May 2026, Hadi Fayyadh joined Tōkai Soccer League club Vencedor Mie United after leaving PDRM.

== International career ==
=== Youth ===
Hadi is a Malaysian youth international. In July 2012, he made his first international debut for Malaysia U12 in International youth football tournament in Saitama, Japan. He was a member of the Malaysia U14 team in 2014 AFC U-14 Championship qualification that will take place in Myanmar in June 2013.

Hadi was part of the national team for the 2017 AFF U-18 Youth Championship that will take place in Yangon, Myanmar. He scored 3 goals in 7 appearances during the matches. He has played in the final against Thailand which Malaysia lost 2–0.

On 26 October 2017, Hadi was selected to play in 2018 AFC U-19 Championship qualification in Paju, South Korea. He scored 3 goals in 4 matches which confirmed Malaysia under-19s qualification to the 2018 AFC U-19 Championship for the first time in 11 years after finishing as one of the five best group runners-up.

Hadi was named in the Malaysia under 19 squad for 2018 AFF U-19 Youth Championship in the Indonesia. He played every minute of Malaysia's campaign at the tournament, which Malaysia won the AFF U-19 Youth Championship.

On 15 October 2018, he was named in the under-19 side for the 2018 AFC U-19 Championship. He played every minute of Malaysia's campaign at the tournament, which ended with them eliminated in last place in their group.

In November 2017, Hadi received his first call-up to the Malaysia U-23 for the centralised training camp as a preparation for 2018 AFC U-23 Championship. On 29 December 2017, he was selected to play in 2018 AFC U-23 Championship in China.On 20 January 2018, Hadi made his first appearance for the Malaysia U23 came from the bench in the 67th minute in a 1–2 defeat to South Korea at Changshu Stadium.

Hadi was named in the 20-man Malaysia Squad for the 2018 Asian Games, in the Jakarta-Palembang, Indonesia.

=== Senior ===
On 11 July 2026, Hadi was called up by Malaysia interim manager Tan Cheng Hoe for the 25-man final squad list for the 2026 ASEAN Championship. He made his international debut on 19 August against Vietnam at the Mỹ Đình National Stadium.

== Career statistics ==
=== Club ===
As of 9 June 2026.

Appearances and goals by club, season and competition.
Club performance			League		Cup		League Cup		Continental (Note: Includes cup competitions such as the AFC Champions Cup, and AFC Cup)		Total	
Club	Season	League	Apps	Goals	Apps	Goals	Apps	Goals	Apps	Goals	Apps	Goals
Johor Darul Ta'zim II	2016	Malaysia Premier League	7	0	1 (Note: Appearances in Malaysia FA Cup)	0	3 (Note: Appearances in Malaysia Cup)	1	–		11	1
Johor Darul Ta'zim II	2017	Malaysia Premier League	8	1	1	2	0	0	–		9	3
Johor Darul Ta'zim II	2018	Malaysia Premier League	12	3	0	0	0	0	–		12	3
Johor Darul Ta'zim II	Total		27	4	2	2	3	1	0	0	32	7
Johor Darul Ta'zim	2017	Malaysia Super League	1	0	0	0	0	0	–		1	0
Fagiano Okayama	2019	J2 League	0	0	0	0	0	0	–		0	0
Azul Claro Numazu (Loan)	2021	J3 League	0	0	0	0	0	0	-		0	0
Azul Claro Numazu (loan)	2022	J3 League	3	0	0	0	0	0	-		3	0
Perak	2023	Malaysia Super League	11	0	1	0	0	0	–		12	0
PDRM (loan)	2023	Malaysia Super League	9	0	0	0	2	1	0	0	11	1
PDRM	2024–25	Malaysia Super League	14	0	0	0	7 (Note: Appearances in MFL Challenge Cup)	2	-		21	2
PDRM	2025–26	Malaysia Super League	7	0	1	0	1	0	-		9	0
PDRM	Total		21	0	1	0	8	2	0	0	31	2
Vencedor Mie United	2026	Tōkai Soccer League	2	0	0	0	0	0	–		2	0
Career total			77	5	4	2	13	4	0	0	95	11

== Honours ==
=== Club ===
Johor Darul Ta'zim

- Malaysia Super League: 2017

PDRM

- MFL Challenge Cup: 2023

=== International ===
Malaysia U-19

- AFF U-19 Youth Championship: 2018
- AFF U-19 Youth Championship runners-up: 2017

=== Individual ===
- Southeast Asian Games Top scorer: 2021
