= Saddil Ramdani =

Indonesian footballer (born 1999)

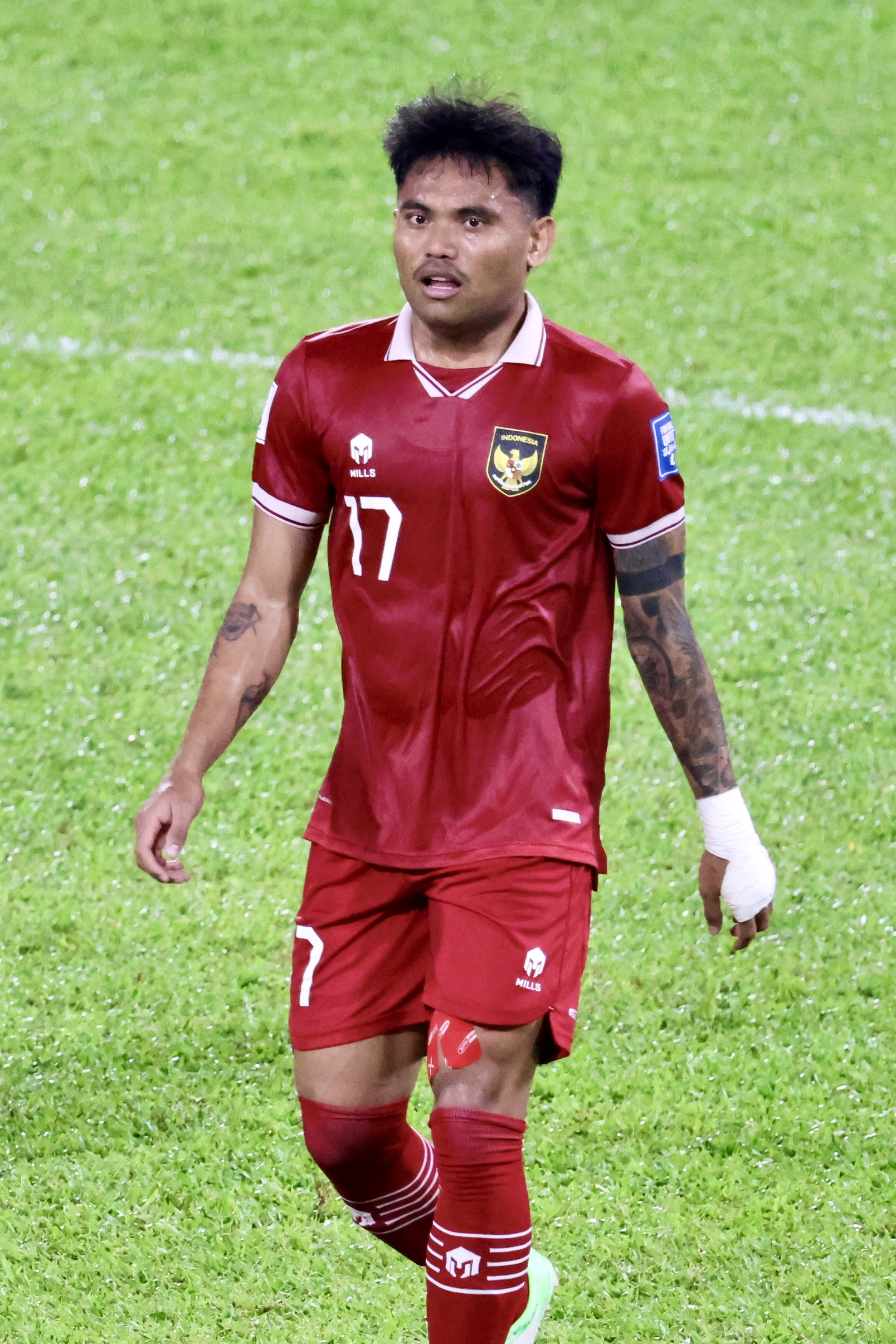
- Saddil playing for Indonesia in 2023

Personal information
- Full name: Saddil Ramdani
- Date of birth: 2 January 1999 (age 27)
- Place of birth: Raha, Indonesia
- Height: 1.72 m (5 ft 8 in)
- Positions: Winger; attacking midfielder

Team information
- Current team: Persebaya Surabaya (On loan from Persib Bandung)
- Number: 42

Youth career
- 2012–2015: ASIFA

Senior career*
Years	Team	Apps	(Gls)
2016–2018	Persela Lamongan	41	(5)
2019	Sri Pahang	21	(2)
2020	Bhayangkara	3	(0)
2021–2025	Sabah	67	(19)
2025–	Persib Bandung	25	(3)
2026–	→ Persebaya Surabaya (loan)	1	(0)

International career^{‡}
2013	Indonesia U16	3	(0)
2016–2018	Indonesia U19	19	(11)
2017–2022	Indonesia U23	26	(5)
2017–	Indonesia	31	(2)
Medal record
Men's football
Representing Indonesia
AFF U-19 Youth Championship
Third place	2017 Myanmar
Third place	2018 Indonesia	Team
Southeast Asian Games
Bronze medal – third place	2017 Kuala Lumpur	Team
Silver medal – second place	2019 Philippines	Team
Bronze medal – third place	2021 Vietnam	Team
- * Club domestic league appearances and goals as of 23 May 2026 ‡ National team caps and goals as of 7 August 2026

Saddil Ramdani (born 2 January 1999) is an Indonesian professional footballer who plays as a winger or attacking midfielder for Super League club Persebaya Surabaya on loan from Persib Bandung and the Indonesia national team.

== Early career ==
Saddil comes from the remote Muna Island in Southeast Sulawesi province in eastern Indonesia. He was born in Raha, the main port of Muna, but left his hometown after elementary school to find a way to develop his football hobby. First, he went to provincial capital Kendari where he trained at the Galasiswa soccer school. Impressing scouts from Indonesia's main island of Java, Saddil in 2012 ended up in the East Java city of Malang, where the Aji Santoso International Football Academy (ASIFA) is based.

Under the guidance of former Indonesia national team captain Aji Santoso, at the time coaching the Indonesia U-23 team, Saddil trained and lodged at ASIFA, which enrolled him into a local secondary school that collaborated with the academy.

Saddil developed into a goal-scoring winger at ASIFA, attracting calls from the national youth teams. In the 2016 AFF U-19 Youth Championship, Saddil on 20 September 2016 scored a hattrick against Cambodia that triggered a race among professional Indonesian clubs to be the first to employ his talents.

== Club career ==
=== Persela Lamongan ===
Before he graduated high school, Saddil signed for East Java club Persela Lamongan and played in the 2016 Indonesia Soccer Championship A. He scored his first goal for a professional club in October 2016 when Persela defeated Bali United 3–0. His 90th-minute goal sealed the upset victory. Persela frequently played the teenager in the 2017 Liga 1 and 2018 Liga 1 competitions. Schoolboy Saddil had to juggle between going to classes in Malang and playing for a professional club in Lamongan, three hours away, until he graduated in 2018.

=== Sri Pahang ===
Saddil performance in various international youth competitions in Southeast Asia in 2016 until 2018 made him one of the most exciting talents in the region. In January 2019, Saddil took a leap and signed with Malaysia Super League club Sri Pahang. He made a solid display of 21 appearances and two goals for his first season overseas.

=== Bhayangkara ===
After one year impressing in Malaysia, there was another race in Indonesia to recruit him. Saddil eventually signed for Bhayangkara, a high-paying club owned by the Indonesian Police, to play in the 2020 Liga 1 season. However, he could only play three matches without scoring a goal due to the suspension of the league amid the COVID-19 pandemic.

=== Sabah ===
After his one-year contract with Bhayangkara ended, Saddil decided to play in Malaysia again. He accepted the offer from Sabah coach Kurniawan Dwi Yulianto, a legendary Indonesian striker, to play in the 2021 Malaysia Super League season. On 13 March, Saddil made his debut during a 0–1 league defeat against Petaling Jaya City. Three-days later, Saddil scored his first goal for Sabah against his former club Sri Pahang but failed to make his new team avoid a 2–1 defeat. On 17 April, he scored and assisted twice in a 4–0 win against UiTM.

On 9 March 2022, Saddil scored his first goal of the season, converting a freekick in a 3–1 league win against Petaling Jaya City. On 13 May, Saddil scored a winning goal in the 111th minute after extra-time against Kelantan United in the second-round of the 2022 Malaysia FA Cup, sending his club to the quarter-finals with a 2–1 win. On 17 May, Saddil assisted two-goals in a 4–2 league victory against Penang.

During the 2023–24 AFC Cup match against Indonesian club PSM Makassar on 5 October 2023, Saddil recorded a hat-trick of assist in a 5–0 away win. He also recorded a brace of assist in a 4–1 win against Vietnamese club Hải Phòng.

== International career ==
He made his international debut for the Indonesia senior team on 21 March 2017, against Myanmar.

On 17 August 2017, during a Southeast Asian Games match against Philippines U-23, Saddil scored in the 58th minute from long-range.

On 14 June 2022, Saddil made his debut goal in the senior team against Nepal in a huge 7–0 win in the 2023 AFC Asian Cup qualification.

On 21 November 2023, Saddil scored his second goal for the national team for an equalizer in a 1–1 draw against Philippines in the 2026 FIFA World Cup qualification.

== Career statistics ==
=== Club ===
As of match played 2 March 2026

Club	Season	League			Cup (Note: Appearances in Malaysia FA Cup)		Continental (Note: Appearances in AFC Cup)		Other (Note: Appearances in Malaysia Cup)		Total	
Club	Season	Division	Apps	Goals	Apps	Goals	Apps	Goals	Apps	Goals	Apps	Goals
Persela Lamongan	2016	ISC A	11	1	0	0	–		0	0	11	1
Persela Lamongan	2017	Liga 1	16	2	0	0	–		0	0	16	2
Persela Lamongan	2018	Liga 1	14	2	0	0	–		0	0	14	2
Persela Lamongan	Total		41	5	0	0	–		0	0	41	5
Sri Pahang	2019	Malaysia Super League	21	2	5	0	–		0	0	26	2
Bhayangkara	2020	Liga 1	3	0	0	0	–		0	0	3	0
Sabah	2021	Malaysia Super League	18	3	0	0	–		1	0	18	3
Sabah	2022	Malaysia Super League	17	4	3	1	–		3	0	23	5
Sabah	2023	Malaysia Super League	18	7	1	0	6	0	0	0	25	7
Sabah	2024–25	Malaysia Super League	14	5	2	1	0	0	0	0	16	6
Sabah	Total		67	19	6	2	6	0	4	0	82	23
Persib Bandung	2025–26	Super League	25	3	0	0	7	1	0	0	32	4
Persebaya Surabaya (loan)	2026–27	Super League	0	0	0	0	0	0	0	0	0	0
Career total			157	29	10	2	13	1	4	0	184	32

=== International ===
As of match played 7 August 2026

Appearances and goals by national team and year
National team	Year	Apps	Goals
Indonesia	2017	3	0
Indonesia	2019	4	0
Indonesia	2022	9	1
Indonesia	2023	9	1
Indonesia	2024	3	0
Indonesia	2026	3	0
Total		31	2

As of match played 10 September 2024
Scores and results list Indonesia's goal tally first, score column indicates score after each Saddil goal.

List of international goals scored by Saddil Ramdani
No.	Date	Venue	Cap	Opponent	Score	Result	Competition
1	14 June 2022	Jaber Al-Ahmad International Stadium, Kuwait City, Kuwait	11	Nepal	4–0	7–0	2023 AFC Asian Cup Qualification
2	21 November 2023	Rizal Memorial Stadium, Manila, Philippines	25	Philippines	1–1	1–1	2026 FIFA World Cup qualification

== Honours ==
Persib Bandung

- Super League: 2025–26

Indonesia U19

- AFF U-19 Youth Championship third place: 2017, 2018

Indonesia U23

- SEA Games silver medal: 2019; bronze medal: 2017, 2021
