= 2017 AFF U-18 Youth Championship =

2017 AFF U-18 လူငယ်ပြိုင်ပွဲ

Tournament details
- Host country: Myanmar
- City: Yangon
- Dates: 4–17 September
- Teams: 11 (from 1 sub-confederation)
- Venues: 2 (in 1 host city)

Final positions
- Champions: Thailand (5th title)
- Runners-up: Malaysia
- Third place: Indonesia
- Fourth place: Myanmar

Tournament statistics
- Matches played: 29
- Goals scored: 121 (4.17 per match)
- Attendance: 16,304 (562 per match)
- Top scorer: (Indonesia) Egy Maulana (8 goals)
- Best player: (Indonesia) Egy Maulana

The 2017 AFF U-18 Youth Championship was the 15th edition of the AFF U-19 Youth Championship, organised by ASEAN Football Federation. It was hosted by Myanmar during September 2017. Eleven out of the twelve member associations of the ASEAN Football Federation took part in the tournament featuring two groups of five and six teams.

Thailand beat Malaysia 2–0 in the final to secure their fifth regional title.

== Participant teams ==
All of 12 teams from member associations of the ASEAN Football Federation are eligible for the tournament. The reigning ASEAN U-19 champions − Australia did not enter the tournament. At the 9th meeting of the AFF Council, New Zealand were interested to be an invited guest for the AFF U-18 Championship 2017. Official draw were also conducted to decide on the match-ups of the competitions and New Zealand were in Group B. However, New Zealand withdrew from the tournament, based on the latest schedule. A total of 11 teams from 11 member associations enter the tournament, listed below:

Team	Association	App	Previous best performance
Brunei	FA Brunei DS	7th	Group stage (6 times)
Cambodia	FF Cambodia	9th	Group stage (8 times)
Indonesia	FA Indonesia	8th	Winners (2013)
Laos	Lao FF	9th	Third place (2002, 2005, 2015)
Malaysia	FA Malaysia	11th	Runners-up (2003, 2005, 2006, 2007)
Myanmar	Myanmar FF	11th	Winners (2003, 2005)
Philippines	Philippine FF	7th	Group stage (6 times)
Singapore	FA Singapore	10th	Third place (2003)
Thailand	FA Thailand	13th	Winners (2002, 2009, 2011, 2015)
Timor-Leste	FF Timor-Leste	6th	Third place (2013)
Vietnam	Vietnam FF	13th	Winners (2007)

Did not enter

Australia

Withdrew

New Zealand^{1}

Notes
^{1} Non-AFF member.

== Venues ==
Yangon
Thuwunna Stadium	Aung San Stadium
Capacity: 32,000	Capacity: 40,000

== Group stage ==
- All matches were held in Yangon, Myanmar
- All times are local, AIFTA (UTC+6:30).

=== Group A ===
Pos	Team	Pld	W	D	L	GF	GA	GD	Pts	Qualification
1	Malaysia	5	4	1	0	13	3	+10	13	Knockout stage
2	Thailand	5	4	1	0	9	2	+7	13	Knockout stage
3	Timor-Leste	5	2	1	2	7	10	−3	7	
4	Singapore	5	2	0	3	10	11	−1	6	
5	Cambodia	5	1	1	3	8	10	−2	4	
6	Laos	5	0	0	5	5	16	−11	0	

Source: AFF
4 September 2017
15:00

Thailand	3–0	Timor-Leste
Ekanit 42'; Natthawut 83'; Chaiwat 90+1'	Report

Thuwunna Stadium, Yangon
Attendance: 300
Referee: Khaing Zaw (Myanmar)
4 September 2017
15:00

Malaysia	4–1	Laos
Hadi 28', 90+1'; Akhyar 45', 60'	Report	Bounkong 48'

Aung San Stadium, Yangon
Attendance: 100
Referee: Hoàng Ngọc Hà (Vietnam)
4 September 2017
18:00

Singapore	5–3	Cambodia
Hassim 11'; Mustaffa 17', 35', 45'; Mahler 63'	Report	Kakada 3'; Kimchay 20'; Chanthea 29'; Kimheng (red card) 90'

Thuwunna Stadium, Yangon
Attendance: 300
Referee: Wicaksana Adi (Indonesia)

6 September 2017
15:00

Malaysia	3–1	Singapore
Zafuan 58'; Ammar 69'; Hadi 90+1' (pen.)	Report	Ellison 90+1'

Aung San Stadium, Yangon
Attendance: 109
Referee: Clifford Daypuyat (Philippines)
6 September 2017
15:00

Cambodia	1–1	Timor-Leste
Visinu 27'	Report	Ximenes 58'

Thuwunna Stadium, Yangon
Attendance: 90
Referee: Thoriq Alkatiri (Indonesia)
6 September 2017
18:00

Laos	1–2	Thailand
Phommachai 90+2'	Report	Yuthpichai 10' (pen.), 26'

Thuwunna Stadium, Yangon
Attendance: 90
Referee: Soe Lin Aung (Myanmar)

8 September 2017
15:00

Laos	0–3	Singapore
	Report	Daniel 28'; Rafiqin 42'; Idraki 81'

Aung San Stadium, Yangon
Attendance: 105
Referee: Hoàng Ngọc Hà (Vietnam)
8 September 2017
15:00

Thailand	1–0	Cambodia
Danusorn 46'	Report

Thuwunna Stadium, Yangon
Attendance: 90
Referee: Wicaksana Adi (Indonesia)
8 September 2017
18:00

Timor-Leste	0–3	Malaysia
	Report	Akhyar 8'; Nurfais 56'; Saiful 90'

Thuwunna Stadium, Yangon
Attendance: 90
Referee: Khaing Zaw (Myanmar)

10 September 2017
15:00

Cambodia	0–2	Malaysia
	Report	Shafizi 22'; Syafiq 54'

Thuwunna Stadium, Yangon
Attendance: 100
Referee: Soe Lin Aung (Myanmar)
10 September 2017
15:00

Timor-Leste	3–2	Laos
Panji 30', 68'; Ximenes 41'	Report	Thinolath 15'; Thongsavath 16'

Aung San Stadium, Yangon
Attendance: 82
Referee: Thoriq Alkatiri (Indonesia)
10 September 2017
18:00

Singapore	0–2	Thailand
	Report	Yuthpichai 67'; Chokanan 75'

Thuwunna Stadium, Yangon
Attendance: 100
Referee: Clifford Daypuyat (Philippines)

12 September 2017
15:00

Thailand	1–1	Malaysia
Kaman 63'	Report	Akif 50'

Thuwunna Stadium, Yangon
Attendance: 70
Referee: Thant Zin Oo (Myanmar)
12 September 2017
15:00

Laos	1–4	Cambodia
Bounkong 20'	Report	Vicheth 16'; Kimheng 43'; Oy 75'; Chanthea 79'

Aung San Stadium, Yangon
Attendance: 77
Referee: Wicaksana Adi (Indonesia)
12 September 2017
18:00

Timor-Leste	3–1	Singapore
Ximenes 25'; Silva 39'; Conceicao 78'	Report	Mahler 34'

Thuwunna Stadium, Yangon
Attendance: 64
Referee: Soe Lin Aung (Myanmar)

=== Group B ===
Pos	Team	Pld	W	D	L	GF	GA	GD	Pts	Qualification
1	Indonesia	4	3	0	1	19	4	+15	9	Knockout stage
2	Myanmar (H)	4	3	0	1	17	3	+14	9	Knockout stage
3	Vietnam	4	3	0	1	17	3	+14	9	
4	Brunei	4	1	0	3	4	25	−21	3	
5	Philippines	4	0	0	4	2	24	−22	0	
6	New Zealand	0	0	0	0	0	0	0	0	Withdrew

Source: AFF
(H) Hosts
5 September 2017
15:00

Philippines	2–3	Brunei
Suba 31'; Tacardon 55'	Report	Mateen 32'; Asyraffahmi 49' (pen.); Wadud 65'

Thuwunna Stadium, Yangon
Attendance: 1,052
Referee: Xaypaseuth Phongsanit (Laos)
5 September 2017
18:00

Indonesia	2–1	Myanmar
Egy 72', 90+3'	Report	Myat Kaung Khant 28'

Thuwunna Stadium, Yangon
Attendance: 3,805
Referee: Mohammad Zamzaidi Katimin (Malaysia)

7 September 2017
15:00

Brunei	1–8	Vietnam
Asyraffahmi 43'	Report	Lê Xuân Tú 15', 74'; Nguyễn Hồng Sơn 26'; Trần Văn Công 45+1'; Đặng Văn Tới 77' (pen.); Nguyễn Khắc Khiêm 78', 90+1'; Mai Sỹ Hoàng 89'

Thuwunna Stadium, Yangon
Attendance: 200
Referee: Warintorn Sassadee (Thailand)
7 September 2017
18:00

Philippines	0–9	Indonesia
Kammeraad (red card) 89'	Report	Feby 7', 67', 87'; Egy 21', 37' (pen.); Iqbal 25', 39'; Rafli 90+1' (pen.); Resky 90+2'

Thuwunna Stadium, Yangon
Attendance: 300
Referee: Thant Zin Oo (Myanmar)

9 September 2017
15:00

Vietnam	5–0	Philippines
Trần Văn Công 21', 45+3'; Bùi Hoàng Việt Anh 45'; Trần Bảo Toàn 76'; Lê Minh Bình 90'	Report

Thuwunna Stadium, Yangon
Attendance: 180
Referee: Mohammad Zamzaidi Katimin (Malaysia)
9 September 2017
18:00

Myanmar	7–0	Brunei
Eant Maw Oo 9'; Naing Ko Ko 24', 65'; Win Naing Tun 45', 60', 62', 77'	Report

Thuwunna Stadium, Yangon
Attendance: 1,804
Referee: Xaypaseuth Phongsanit (Laos)

11 September 2017
15:00

Indonesia	0–3	Vietnam
	Report	Lê Văn Nam 41', 45'; Bùi Hoàng Việt Anh 86'

Thuwunna Stadium, Yangon
Attendance: 465
Referee: Warintorn Sassadee (Thailand)
11 September 2017
18:00

Philippines	0–7	Myanmar
	Report	Pyae Sone Naing 51', 74'; Win Naing Tun 56', 63', 85'; Myat Kaung Khant 76', 89'

Thuwunna Stadium, Yangon
Attendance: 1,260
Referee: Xaypaseuth Phongsanit (Laos)

13 September 2017
15:00

Brunei	0–8	Indonesia
	Report	Rafli 1', 42', 45'; Egy 18', 23'; Witan 41', 67'; Hanis 68'

Thuwunna Stadium, Yangon
Attendance: 365
Referee: Xaypaseuth Phongsanit (Laos)
13 September 2017
18:00

Myanmar	2–1	Vietnam
Myat Kaung Khant 74'; Lwin Moe Aung 86'	Report	Hồng Sơn 1'

Thuwunna Stadium, Yangon
Attendance: 5,106
Referee: Clifford Daypuyat (Philippines)

== Knockout stage ==
In the knockout stage, the penalty shoot-out is used to decide the winner if necessary.

=== Bracket ===
Semi-finals
15 September – Yangon
Indonesia	0 (2)
Thailand (p)	0 (3)
15 September – Yangon
Malaysia (p)	0 (5)
Myanmar	0 (4)

Final
17 September – Yangon
Thailand	2
Malaysia	0
Third Place
17 September – Yangon
Indonesia	7
Myanmar	1

=== Semi-finals ===
15 September 2017
15:00

Indonesia	0–0	Thailand
Saddil (red card) 44'
Penalties
Egy (penalty scored); Iqbal (penalty missed); Luthfi (penalty scored); Nurhidayat (penalty missed); Rifad (penalty missed)	2–3	(penalty missed) Kritsada; (penalty scored) Nattawut; (penalty scored) Chokanan; (penalty scored) Teerapat

Thuwunna Stadium, Yangon
Referee: Clifford Daypuyat (Philippines)
15 September 2017
18:00

Malaysia	0–0	Myanmar
Penalties
Hadi (penalty scored); Zafuan (penalty scored); Izzudin (penalty scored); Nurfais (penalty scored); Ammar (penalty missed); Syaiful (penalty scored)	5–4	(penalty scored) Pyae Sone Naing; (penalty missed) Than Htike Zin; (penalty scored) Myat Kaung Khant; (penalty scored) Naing Ko Ko; (penalty scored) Soe Moe Kyaw; (penalty missed) Aung Wunna Soe

Thuwunna Stadium, Yangon
Referee: Hoàng Ngọc Hà (Vietnam)

=== Third place match ===
17 September 2017
15:00

Indonesia	7–1	Myanmar
Rafli 14', 59'; Witan 27'; Egy 35', 86'; Hanis 72', 90+3'	Report	Pyae Sone Naing 90+2'

Thuwunna Stadium, Yangon
Referee: Xaypaseuth Phongsanit (Laos)

=== Final ===
17 September 2017
18:00

Thailand	2–0	Malaysia
Ekanit 48'; Kritsada 51'; Wudtichai (red card) 67'	Report

Thuwunna Stadium, Yangon
Referee: Clifford Daypuyat (Philippines)

== Winner ==
2017 AFF U-18 Youth Championship Winners
(Thailand)
Thailand
5th title

== Awards ==
Most Valuable Player	Top Scorer Award	Fair Play Award
(Indonesia) Egy Maulana	(Indonesia) Egy Maulana	Thailand

== Goalscorers ==
8 goals

- (Indonesia) Egy Maulana

7 goals

- (Myanmar) Win Naing Tun

6 goals

- (Indonesia) Rafli Mursalim
- (Myanmar) Myat Kaung Khant

3 goals

- (Indonesia) Feby Eka Putra
- (Indonesia) Hanis Saghara Putra
- (Indonesia) Witan Sulaeman
- (Malaysia) Akhyar Rashid
- (Malaysia) Hadi Fayyadh
- (Myanmar) Pyae Sone Naing
- (Singapore) Danial Mustaffa
- (Thailand) Yuthpichai Lertlum
- (Timor-Leste) Lourenco Ximenes
- (Vietnam) Trần Văn Công

2 goals

- (Brunei) Nur Asyraffahmi Norsamri
- (Cambodia) Sieng Chanthea
- (Indonesia) Muhammad Iqbal
- (Laos) Bounphachan Bounkong
- (Myanmar) Naing Ko Ko
- (Singapore) Jacob Mahler
- (Thailand) Kritsada Kaman
- (Timor-Leste) João Panji
- (Vietnam) Bùi Hoàng Việt Anh
- (Vietnam) Nguyễn Khắc Khiêm
- (Vietnam) Lê Văn Nam
- (Vietnam) Lê Xuân Tú
- (Vietnam) Nguyễn Hồng Sơn

1 goal

- (Cambodia) Sin Kakada
- (Cambodia) Touch Kimchay
- (Cambodia) Teat Kimheng
- (Cambodia) Phom Oy
- (Cambodia) Chhoeung Visinu
- (Cambodia) Tray Vicheth
- (Brunei) Abdul Mateen Said
- (Brunei) Abdul Wadud Ramli
- (Indonesia) Resky Fandi Witriawan
- (Laos) Chanthachone Thinolath
- (Laos) Lektoxa Thongsavath
- (Laos) Phoutthasit Phommachai
- (Malaysia) Ammar Alias
- (Malaysia) Muhammad Syafiq Danial
- (Malaysia) Muhd Zafuan Azeman
- (Malaysia) Nik Akif Syahiran Nik Mat
- (Malaysia) Nurfais Johari
- (Malaysia) Saiful Iskandar
- (Malaysia) Shafizi Iqmal
- (Myanmar) Eant Maw Oo
- (Myanmar) Lwin Moe Aung
- (Philippines) Mariano Suba
- (Philippines) Paludan Tacardon
- (Singapore) Daniel Goh
- (Singapore) Idraki Mohd Adnan
- (Singapore) Katz Ellison
- (Singapore) Mohammad Hassim
- (Singapore) Muhammad Rafiqin
- (Thailand) Chaiwat Weerakitpanit
- (Thailand) Chokanan Saima-in
- (Thailand) Danusorn Somcob
- (Thailand) Ekanit Panya
- (Thailand) Nattawut Chootiwat
- (Timor-Leste) Expedito da Conceicao
- (Timor-Leste) Orcelio da Silva
- (Vietnam) Đặng Văn Tới
- (Vietnam) Lê Minh Bình
- (Vietnam) Mai Sỹ Hoàng
- (Vietnam) Trần Bảo Toàn
