= Muhammad Syaiful Alias =

Malaysian association football player

Syaiful Alias
Personal information
- Full name: Muhammad Syaiful bin Alias
- Date of birth: 4 February 1999 (age 27)
- Place of birth: Kelantan, Malaysia
- Height: 1.74 m (5 ft 8 1/2 in)
- Position: Centre-back

Youth career
- 2016–2018: Kelantan

Senior career*
Years	Team	Apps	(Gls)
2018–2020	Kelantan	8	(0)

International career^{‡}
2017–2019	Malaysia U19	13	(1)
Medal record
AFF U-19 Youth Championship
First place	2018 Indonesia
Second place	2017 Myanmar
- * Club domestic league appearances and goals as of 23 July 2018 ‡ National team caps and goals as of 4 July 2018

Muhammad Syaiful bin Alias (born 4 February 1999) is a Malaysian professional footballer who plays as a centre-back.

== Honours ==
Malaysia U19

- AFF U-19 Youth Championship: 2018; runner-up: 2017
