= Akhyar Rashid =

Malaysian footballer

Personal information
- Date of birth: 1 May 1999 (age 27)
- Place of birth: Alor Star, Kedah, Malaysia
- Height: 1.69 m (5 ft 7 in)
- Position: Forward

Team information
- Current team: Negeri Sembilan (on loan from Terengganu)
- Number: 32

Youth career
- 2015–2017: Kedah

Senior career*
Years	Team	Apps	(Gls)
2017–2018	Kedah	20	(3)
2019–2024	Johor Darul Ta'zim	54	(9)
2024–2025	→ Terengganu (loan)	22	(2)
2025–	Terengganu	18	(2)
2026–	→ Negeri Sembilan (loan)	0	(0)

International career^{‡}
2015	Malaysia U17		
2017–2018	Malaysia U19	14	(6)
2017–2019	Malaysia U23	24	(6)
2018–	Malaysia	54	(10)
Medal record
Men's football
Representing Malaysia
AFF Championship
Runner-up	2018
King's Cup
Runner-up	2022
Merdeka Tournament
Winner	2024
Runner-up	2023
Sea Games
Silver medal – second place	2017 Kuala Lumpur	Football
AFF U-19 Youth Championship
First place	2018 Indonesia
Second place	2017 Myanmar
- * Club domestic league appearances and goals as of 24 May 2024 ‡ National team caps and goals as of 22 March 2024

Muhammad Akhyar bin Abdul Rashid (born 1 May 1999), better known as Akhyar Rashid, is a Malaysian professional footballer who plays either as a winger or striker for Malaysia Super League club Negeri Sembilan on loan from Terengganu and the Malaysia national team.

== Early life ==
Born in Jitra, Kedah, Malaysia, Akhyar grew up playing football from a young age, stating previously that his brothers' participation in the sport encouraged him to play. He is also known as Mat Yat by Kedah fans.

== Club career ==
=== Kedah ===
Akhyar first played and joined the Kedah youth academy when he was 15 years old. He was given another change at Kedah first youth eleven. He spent time in Youth Cup played for Kedah Under-19. On 16 October 2017, he helped Kedah U-19 to win the first ever cup. In January 2015, he even had a month-long training stint with Cardiff City Academy in the United Kingdom.

On 4 March 2017, Akhyar made his first-team debut for 2017 season coming on as a substitute for Syazwan Zainon in the 80th minute of 4–0 win at Darul Aman. He scored his senior goals on 27 July 2017 in a Malaysia Cup match against Melaka United in victory win 6–2.

On 11 February 2018, Akhyar has scored his first goals on his 7th appearance for Kedah FA in the Malaysia Super League match against PKNP in a 0–1 win at Penang State Stadium.

=== Johor Darul Ta'zim ===
On 29 December 2018, Akhyar signed a contract with Johor Darul Ta'zim. He made his debut for the club coming on as a substitute in a 1–0 win over Perak on 2 February 2019. Akhyar made his AFC Champions League debut in a 2–1 loss against Japanese club Kashima Antlers at the Kashima Soccer Stadium. He then scored his first goal for the club in which he also got an assist in a 3–1 win over FELDA United on 5 April.

During the 2023–24 AFC Champions League match on 7 November 2023, Akhyar scored in the 87th minute to secure a massive 3 points in a 2–1 win over Korean club Ulsan Hyundai.

==== Terengganu (loan) ====
On 12 February 2024, Akhyar joined Terengganu on loan alongside teammate, Safawi Rasid. On 30 July, he recorded a goal and an assist in a 3–2 win over Negeri Sembilan.

=== Terengganu ===
On 28 April 2025, Akhyar permanently signed a two-years contract until 2027 where he scored 10 goals and 4 assists in 22 appearances for the club in the 2024–25 season. Akhyar impressed throughout the season becoming a key player for the club.

== International career ==
=== Youth ===
Akhyar has represented Malaysia at all youth levels from the under 16 to the under-23 sides. He was a member of the Malaysia U17 in 2015 Asian Inter-School Championship held in China in August 2015.

Akhyar was part of the national team for the 2017 AFF U-18 Youth Championship that took place in Yangon, Myanmar. He scored 3 goals in 5 appearances during the matches. He has played in the final against Thailand which Malaysia lost 2–0. On 26 October 2017, Akhyar was selected to play in 2018 AFC U-19 Championship qualification in Paju, South Korea. Akhyar played a large role in the Malaysia under-19s during the qualification campaign. He scored 1 goals in 4 matches which confirmed Malaysia under-19s qualification to the 2018 AFC U-19 Championship for the first time in 11 years after finishing as one of the five best group runners-up. Akhyar was named in the Malaysia under 19 squad for 2018 AFF U-19 Youth Championship in the Indonesia. He has not played in the final against Myanmar which Malaysia win 4–3.

On 15 October 2018, he was named in the under-19 side for the 2018 AFC U-19 Championship.

Akhyar made 6 appearances in 2017 Southeast Asian Games for Malaysia U23. He has played in the final against Thailand which Malaysia lost 0–1 due to an own goal scored by Malaysian keeper Haziq Nadzli. On 23 November 2017, Akhyar has been enlisted in Malaysia U22's 30-man provisional squad for the 2018 AFC U-23 Championship and on 29 December 2017 he was selected to play at the tournament.

Akhyar was named in the 20-man Malaysia under-23 for the 2018 Asian Games. On 15 August, Akhyar scored a goal in a 3–1 win over Kyrgyzstan.

=== Senior ===
In March 2018, Akhyar was called up to the Malaysian national team for the friendly against Mongolia. On 22 March 2018, he earned his first international cap at the Bukit Jalil National Stadium, coming on as a substitute for Mahali Jasuli in the 45th minute. In just his first appearance for Malaysia, Akhyar scored his first international goal.

On 4 November 2018, he was named in the Malaysia national team for the 2018 AFF Championship.

In June 2019, Akhyar was named in the 23-man for the 2022 FIFA World Cup qualifier against Timor-Leste which Malaysia won 7–1 in the first leg and 5–1 in the second leg. Akhyar scored a goal in each match.

On 23 March 2022, in what was Malaysia's first match under the new head coach Kim Pan-gon, Akhyar scored a brace against Philippines in a friendly match, resulting in a 2–0 victory. Akhyar also represented the nation at the 2023 AFC Asian Cup where he played in all of the group stage matches.

== Personal life ==
Akhyar's elder brother Rafdi Rashid was a former striker for Kedah. His older sister Nurrashidah Rashid is currently a Malaysian national Sepak takraw player.

On 2 May 2024, Akhyar sustained injuries to his head and legs after being beaten with an iron rod during a robbery outside his residence in Terengganu.

In November 2024, he engaged with Eyka Farhana, an announcement made through her social media account.

== Career statistics ==
=== Club ===
As of 16 December 2023.

Appearances and goals by club, season and competition
Club	Season	League			Cup		League Cup		Continental		Total	
Club	Season	Division	Apps	Goals	Apps	Goals	Apps	Goals	Apps	Goals	Apps	Goals
Kedah	2017	Malaysia Super League	3	0	1 (Note: Appearances in Malaysia FA Cup)	0	2 (Note: Appearances in Malaysia Cup)	1	0	0	6	1
Kedah	2018	Malaysia Super League	17	3	1	0	2	1	—		20	4
Kedah	Total		20	3	2	0	4	2	0	0	26	5
Johor Darul Ta'zim	2019	Malaysia Super League	19	3	1	0	7	0	4 (Note: Appearances in AFC Champions League)	0	31	3
Johor Darul Ta'zim	2020	Malaysia Super League	5	1	0	0	0	0	1	0	6	1
Johor Darul Ta'zim	2021	Malaysia Super League	9	1	0	0	0	0	4	0	13	1
Johor Darul Ta'zim	2022	Malaysia Super League	7	1	1	0	3	2	1	0	12	3
Johor Darul Ta'zim	2023	Malaysia Super League	13	3	3	0	2	1	0	0	18	4
Johor Darul Ta'zim	Total		54	9	5	0	12	3	10	0	81	12
Career total			114	16	15	3	26	9	15	4	170	32

=== International ===
As of 22 March 2024

Appearances and goals by national team and year
National team	Year	Apps	Goals
Malaysia	2018	13	1
Malaysia	2019	10	3
Malaysia	2020	0	0
Malaysia	2021	5	1
Malaysia	2022	8	2
Malaysia	2023	9	3
Malaysia	2024	4	0
Total		49	10

==== International goals ====
As of match played 6 September 2023. Malaysia score listed first, score column indicates score after each Akhyar Rashid goal.

International goals by date, venue, cap, opponent, score, result and competition
No.	Date	Venue	Cap	Opponent	Score	Result	Competition
1	22 March 2018	Bukit Jalil National Stadium, Bukit Jalil, Malaysia	1	Mongolia	2–1	2–2	Friendly
2	7 June 2019	Bukit Jalil National Stadium, Bukit Jalil, Malaysia	15	Timor-Leste	7–1	7–1	2022 FIFA World Cup qualification
3	11 June 2019	Bukit Jalil National Stadium, Bukit Jalil, Malaysia	16	Timor-Leste	4–0	5–1	2022 FIFA World Cup qualification
4	5 October 2019	Bukit Jalil National Stadium, Bukit Jalil, Malaysia	19	Sri Lanka	4–0	6–0	Friendly
5	6 December 2021	Bishan Stadium, Bishan, Singapore	23	Cambodia	2–0	3–1	2020 AFF Championship
6	23 March 2022	Kallang Stadium, Kallang, Singapore	27	Philippines	1–0	2–0	2022 FAS Tri-Nations Series
7	23 March 2022	Kallang Stadium, Kallang, Singapore	27	Philippines	2–0	2–0	2022 FAS Tri-Nations Series
8	23 March 2023	Sultan Ibrahim Stadium, Johor, Malaysia	37	Turkmenistan	1–0	1–0	Friendly
9	28 March 2023	Sultan Ibrahim Stadium, Johor, Malaysia	38	Hong Kong	1–0	2–0	Friendly
10	6 September 2023	East Town Sports Park Stadium, Chengdu, China	41	Syria	1–2	2–2	Friendly

== Honours ==
Kedah

- Youth Cup: 2017
- Malaysia FA Cup: 2017
- Malaysia Cup runner-up: 2017
- Malaysia Charity Shield: runner-up:2018

Johor Darul Ta'zim

- Malaysia Charity Shield: 2019, 2020, 2021, 2022, 2023
- Malaysia Super League: 2019, 2020, 2021, 2022, 2023
- Malaysia Cup: 2019, 2022, 2023
- Malaysia FA Cup: 2022, 2023

Malaysia U-19

- AFF U-19 Youth Championship : 2018, runner-up: 2017

Malaysia U-23

- SEA Games : (silver) Silver 2017

Malaysia

- AFF Championship runner-up: 2018
- King's Cup runner-up: 2022
- Pestabola Merdeka: 2024; runner-up 2023

Individual

- FAM Football Awards – Best Striker: 2018
- FAM Football Awards – Best Young Player: 2019
- Malaysia Super League Team of the Season: 2018, 2019
