= Narakorn Noomchansakul =

Thai footballer (born 1999)

Personal information
- Date of birth: 12 April 1999 (age 27)
- Place of birth: Phichit, Thailand
- Height: 1.75 m (5 ft 9 in)
- Position: Midfielder

Team information
- Current team: Uthai Thani
- Number: 23

Senior career*
Years	Team	Apps	(Gls)
2017–2023	Ratchaburi Mitr Phol	24	(0)
2020	→ Muangkan United (loan)	10	(2)
2022	→ Uthai Thani (loan)	11	(0)
2023–2026	Uthai Thani	14	(0)
2023–2024	→ Customs United (loan)	15	(0)

International career^{‡}
2018–2019	Thailand U19	7	(1)
2021–2022	Thailand U23	4	(0)
Medal record
Thailand under-23
Southeast Asian Games
Silver medal – second place	Sea Games 2021	Football
- * Club domestic league appearances and goals as of 1 February 2025 ‡ National team caps and goals as of 22 May 2022

Narakorn Noomchansakul (Thai: นรากร นุ่มจันทร์สกุล; born April 12, 1999) is a Thai professional footballer who plays as a midfielder for Thai League 1 club Uthai Thani .

== International goals ==
=== under-19 ===
#	Date	Venue	Opponent	Score	Result	Competition
1.	7 July 2018	Sidoarjo, Indonesia	Philippines	0–4	0–4(W)	2018 AFF U-19 Youth Championship

== Honours ==
=== International ===
Thailand U23

- Southeast Asian Games (silver) Silver medal: 2021
