= Egy Maulana Vikri =

Indonesian footballer

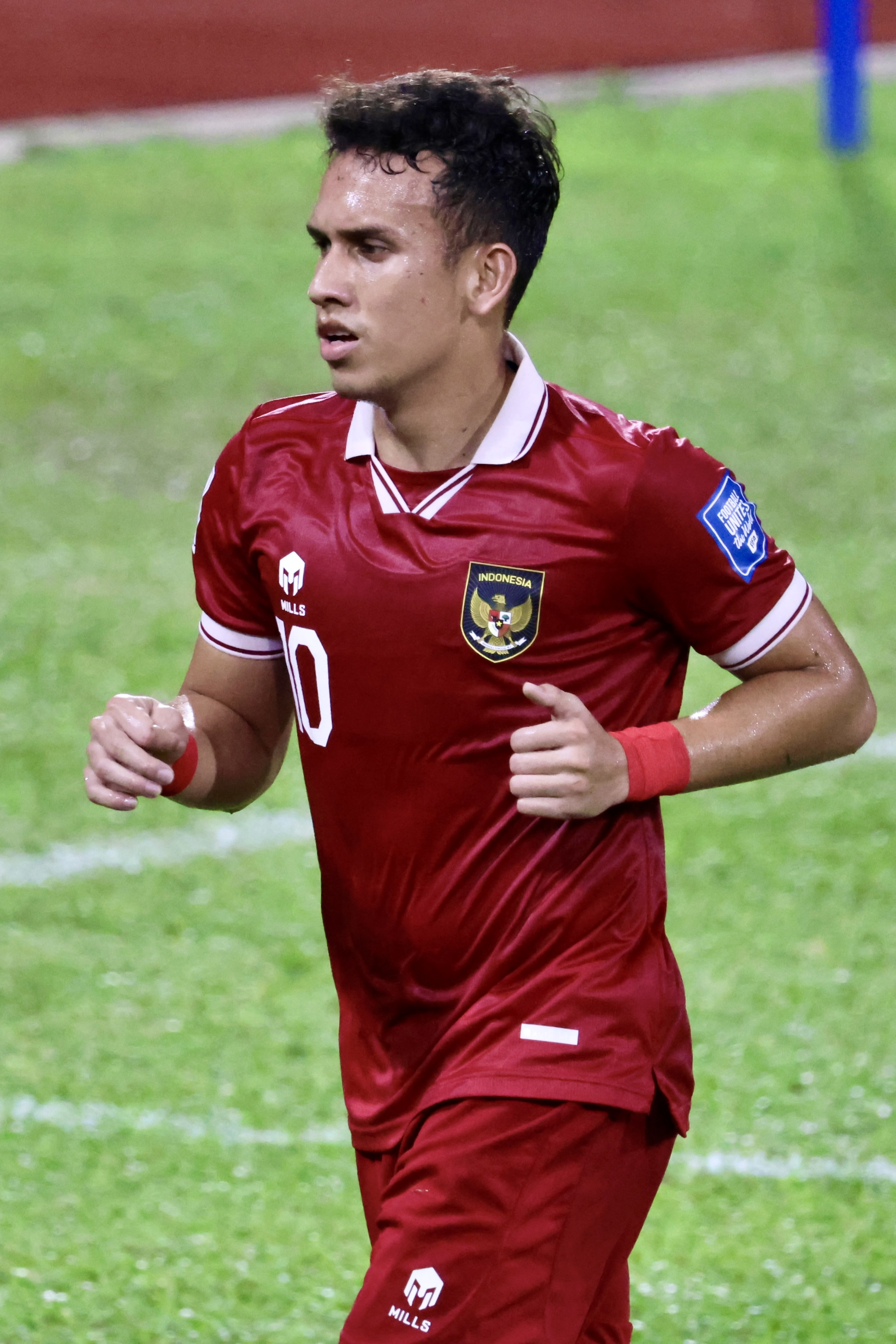
- Egy playing for Indonesia in 2023

Personal information
- Full name: Egy Maulana Vikri
- Date of birth: 7 July 2000 (age 26)
- Place of birth: Medan, Indonesia
- Height: 1.70 m (5 ft 7 in)
- Positions: Winger; attacking midfielder

Team information
- Current team: Dewa United Banten
- Number: 10

Youth career
- 2005–2012: TASBI Soccer School
- 2015–2016: ASIOP
- 2013–2018: SKO Ragunan

Senior career*
Years	Team	Apps	(Gls)
2018–2021	Lechia Gdańsk II	24	(18)
2018–2021	Lechia Gdańsk	10	(0)
2021–2022	Senica	20	(2)
2022–2023	ViOn Zlaté Moravce	10	(0)
2023–	Dewa United Banten	107	(22)

International career^{‡}
2014–2015	Indonesia U16	6	(4)
2017–2018	Indonesia U19	16	(14)
2017–2023	Indonesia U23	22	(8)
2018–	Indonesia	37	(9)
Medal record
Men's football
Representing Indonesia
FIFA ASEAN Cup
Winner	2026 Indonesia	Team
AFF Championship
Runner-up	2020 Singapore	Team
Southeast Asian Games
Silver medal – second place	2019 Philippines	Team
Bronze medal – third place	2021 Vietnam	Team
AFF U-19 Youth Championship
Third place	2017 Myanmar
Third place	2018 Indonesia	Team
- * Club domestic league appearances and goals as of 31 October 2026 ‡ National team caps and goals as of 5 October 2026

Egy Maulana Vikri (born 7 July 2000) is an Indonesian professional footballer who plays as a winger or an attacking midfielder for Super League club Dewa United Banten and the Indonesia national team. In 2017, he was named as one of the 60 most talented and promising players born in 2000 by The Guardian.

== Club career ==
=== Early career ===
Egy comes from a family of footballers. His father coached at TASBI Soccer School, a football school in Medan where Egy began to play, while his older brother Yusrizal Muzakki has played for lower league teams in Indonesia. At TASBI SS, Egy participated in the Grassroots Indonesian U-12 Tournament in 2012, when his talent was noticed by the Indonesian national talent scouts. At that time, Egy helped his team to become the champions of that tournament and also ended up as the top scorer. After finishing primary school, he attended Special Sports School, a government secondary school for talented athletes in the Ragunan area of South Jakarta. In 2016, Egy was part of an Indonesian youth team that became champions of the Gothia Cup in Sweden, with him being awarded the Best Player Award for scoring a total of 28 goals.

His talent attracted international media attention when he played for the Indonesia U-19 team that represented Asia in the Toulon Tournament for youth teams from 29 May to 10 June 2017. Although his team lost all of its group matches, Egy won the Jouer Revelation Trophée for being the breakout player in the tournament, an award previously won by Cristiano Ronaldo and Zinedine Zidane.

In September 2017, Egy became the top scorer of the 2017 AFF U-19 Youth Championship with eight goals for the Indonesia U-19 team.

=== Europe trials ===
Egy went on trial to European clubs in 2018 – including Benfica, Sporting CP, Getafe CF, Espanyol, Legia Warsaw, Saint-Étienne, Ajax Amsterdam, and some Italian clubs.

=== Lechia Gdańsk ===
On 11 March 2018, Egy officially joined Lechia Gdańsk on a three–year deal, joining the team on his 18th birthday. He was handed the number 10 shirt, triggering hype in Poland and Indonesia. The same year on 22 December, Egy made his senior debut as a substitute in a league match against Górnik Zabrze. He played in the 2019 Polish Super Cup final against Piast Gliwice, coming on as a substitute in a match that Lechia won 3–1. On 30 June 2021, Egy was announced to leave the club after three years following the expiration of his contract.

=== Senica ===
On 30 August 2021, Egy completed a move to Slovak club Senica on a six-month contract, with an option to extend further for one-and-a-half years. He made his league debut on 12 September at Štadión FK Senica, coming on as a substitute in the 59th minute with an assist in a 1–0 league victory against Pohronie. On 22 September, Egy made his first start in a league cup game against TJ Nafta Gbely, as Senica won 3–0, with Egy assisting the first goal. he scored his first goal on 27 November in a league match against MSK Zilina, which was postponed at half-time when the score was 1–1 due to heavy blizzard. Three days later, he scored another goal in the continuation match, as Senica drew 2–2. His performance led him to be awarded Fortuna Liga Team of The Week, and he was voted as the best AFC International Player of The Week.

In May 2022, Egy terminated his contract with Senica due to the club's financial crisis. It was also reported that Senica had not paid player salaries.

=== Zlaté Moravce ===
On 9 August 2022, Egy signed a one-year contract with another Slovak club Zlaté Moravce. On 13 August, he debuted as a substitute in a 1–0 league loss against Žilina. Despite coming on as a substitute, Egy was sent off at the 83rd minute. On 20 August, two minutes after coming on as a 60th-minute substitute, Egy set up Tomáš Horák's goal in an eventual 2–2 draw against Ružomberok.

=== Dewa United ===
On 30 January 2023, Egy returned to Indonesia, signing for Liga 1 club Dewa United permanently. Three days later, he made his league debut for the club while scoring his first league goal in a 1–1 draw against Madura United at the Indomilk Arena, Tangerang. Six days later, Egy came as a starter with the first assists a winning goal as a substitute at the 12th minute for Majed Osman in Dewa United's 1–0 victory against Borneo Samarinda.

== International career ==
=== Youth ===
"Egy is a special player. Not many players as great as Egy were born in Indonesia"

— Former Indonesia U19 coach, Indra Sjafri on Egy

In December 2014, Egy debuted with his first goal for Indonesia U-16 in a friendly match against Vietnam U-16 one year before Indonesia's FIFA suspension in 2015. Weeks before the suspension, Egy scored two goals in a friendly match against Japan U-16 in April 2015.

On 31 May 2017, Egy debuted for the Indonesia U-19 team in the 2017 Toulon Tournament against Brazil U20. His impressive performance at the tournament earned him the Breakthrough Player of the Tournament. He made his debut for the Indonesia U-23 in a friendly match against the Syria U-23 on 16 November 2017 where he came on as a substitute.

=== Senior ===
On 14 January 2018, Egy debuted for the Indonesia national team in a friendly match against Iceland. He appeared as a second-half substitute, replacing Osvaldo Haay. On 25 May 2021, Egy scored his first international goal in a friendly match in Dubai against Afghanistan.

On 11 October 2021, Egy scored his competitive international goal against Chinese Taipei during the second leg of 2023 AFC Asian Cup qualification – play-off round, which Indonesia won 3–0. On 25 December 2021, he made his debut in a 2020 AFF Championship and also scored against Singapore in the second leg of semi-final in a 4–2 victory after extra-time. He scored again against Thailand in the second leg of the final in a 2–2 draw, avoiding another loss to Thailand.

== Personal life ==
Egy has Dutch ancestry through his paternal grandfather who was born in the Dutch East Indies.

On 10 December 2023, Egy married to Adiba Khanza Az-Zahra, daughter of late Indonesian Islamic preacher Jefri Al Buchori which was held at Hallf Pati Unus, Kebayoran Baru, South Jakarta. Before carrying out their marriage, Adiba and Egy carried out Taaruf for 4 years.

== Career statistics ==
=== Club ===
As of 31 October 2026

Club	Season	League			National cup		Continental		Other		Total	
Club	Season	Division	Apps	Goals	Apps	Goals	Apps	Goals	Apps	Goals	Apps	Goals
Lechia Gdańsk II	2018–19	IV liga	16	13	—		—		—		16	13
Lechia Gdańsk II	2019–20	IV liga	5	2	—		—		—		5	2
Lechia Gdańsk II	2020–21	IV liga	2	2	—		—		—		2	2
Lechia Gdańsk II	Total		23	17	—		—		—		23	17
Lechia Gdańsk	2018–19	Ekstraklasa	2	0	0	0	—		—		2	0
Lechia Gdańsk	2019–20	Ekstraklasa	1	0	0	0	0	0	1 (Note: Appearance in Polish Super Cup)	0	2	0
Lechia Gdańsk	2020–21	Ekstraklasa	7	0	0	0	—		—		7	0
Lechia Gdańsk	Total		10	0	0	0	0	0	1	0	11	0
Senica	2021–22	Slovak Super Liga	20	2	6 (Note: Includes Slovak Cup)	0	—		—		26	2
ViOn Zlaté Moravce	2022–23	Slovak Super Liga	6	0	4	0	—		3 (Note: Appearances in Tipsport liga)	1	13	1
Dewa United Banten	2022–23	Liga 1	10	1	0	0	—		0	0	10	1
Dewa United Banten	2023–24	Liga 1	30	8	0	0	—		0	0	30	8
Dewa United Banten	2024–25	Liga 1	30	12	0	0	—		0	0	30	12
Dewa United Banten	2025–26	Super League	29	0	0	0	5 (Note: Appearances in AFC Challenge League)	3	0	0	34	3
Dewa United Banten	2026–27	Super League	8	1	0	0	0	0	0	0	8	1
Dewa United Banten	Total		107	22	0	0	5	3	0	0	112	25
Career total			166	41	10	0	5	3	4	1	185	45

=== International ===
As of match played 5 October 2026

Appearances and goals by national team and year
National team	Year	Apps	Goals
Indonesia	2018	1	0
Indonesia	2021	10	3
Indonesia	2022	6	3
Indonesia	2023	4	2
Indonesia	2024	10	1
Indonesia	2025	2	0
Indonesia	2026	4	0
Total		37	9

As of match played 5 September 2024
Scores and results list Indonesia's goal tally first, score column indicates score after each Egy goal.

List of international goals scored by Egy Maulana Vikri
No.	Date	Venue	Cap	Opponent	Score	Result	Competition
1	25 May 2021	Jebel Ali Centre of Excellent, Dubai, United Arab Emirates	2	Afghanistan	1–3	2–3	Friendly
2	11 October 2021	Buriram Stadium, Buriram, Thailand	8	Chinese Taipei	1–0	3–0	2023 AFC Asian Cup qualification
3	25 December 2021	National Stadium, Kallang, Singapore	10	Singapore	4–2	4–2 (a.e.t.)	2020 AFF Championship
4	1 January 2022	National Stadium, Kallang, Singapore	12	Thailand	2–2	2–2	2020 AFF Championship
5	23 December 2022	Gelora Bung Karno Stadium, Jakarta, Indonesia	15	Cambodia	1–0	2–1	2022 AFF Championship
6	26 December 2022	Kuala Lumpur Stadium, Kuala Lumpur, Malaysia	16	Brunei	3–0	7–0	2022 AFF Championship
7	8 September 2023	Gelora Bung Tomo Stadium, Surabaya, Indonesia	19	Turkmenistan	2–0	2–0	Friendly
8	17 October 2023	Hassanal Bolkiah National Stadium, Bandar Seri Begawan, Brunei	21	Brunei	2–0	6–0	2026 FIFA World Cup qualification
9	21 March 2024	Gelora Bung Karno Stadium, Jakarta, Indonesia	27	Vietnam	1–0	1–0	2026 FIFA World Cup qualification

== Honours ==
Lechia Gdańsk

- Polish Cup: 2018–19
- Polish Super Cup: 2019

Indonesia U19

- AFF U-19 Youth Championship third place: 2017, 2018

Indonesia U23

- SEA Games silver medal: 2019; bronze medal: 2021
- Aceh World Solidarity Cup runner-up: 2017

Indonesia

- FIFA ASEAN Cup: 2026
- AFF Championship runner-up: 2020

Individual

- AFF U-19 Youth Championship Best Player: 2017
- AFF U-19 Youth Championship top scorer: 2017
- Toulon Tournament Breakthrough Player: 2017
- Southeast Asian Games top scorer: 2021
- Fortuna liga Goal of the Month: November 2021
- Liga 1 Player of the Month: December 2024
- Liga 1 Goal of the Month: April 2025
- Liga 1 Team of the Season: 2024–25
- APPI Indonesian Football Award Best XI: 2024–25
