= Nattawut Chootiwat =

Thai footballer (born 1999)

Personal information
- Full name: Nattawut Chootiwat
- Date of birth: 24 June 1999 (age 27)
- Place of birth: Nong Khai, Thailand
- Height: 1.80 m (5 ft 11 in)
- Position: Midfielder

Youth career
- 2015–2017: Chonburi

Senior career*
Years	Team	Apps	(Gls)
2018–2022	Chonburi	2	(0)
2019	→ Phuket City (loan)		
2020	→ Muangnont Bankunmae (loan)		
2021	→ Songkhla (loan)	0	(0)
2021–2023	→ STK Muangnont (loan)	7	(0)

International career
2017–2018	Thailand U19	14	(3)
2019–	Thailand U23	1	(0)
- * Club domestic league appearances and goals

Nattawut Chootiwat (Thai: ณัฐวุฒิ ชูติวัตร, born June 24, 1999), simply known as Toey (Thai: เต้ย), is a Thai professional footballer who plays as a midfielder.

== International career ==
In September 2017, he won the 2017 AFF U-18 Youth Championship with Thailand U19.

== Honours ==
=== International ===
Thailand U-19

- AFF U-19 Youth Championship: 2017
