= 2018 AFF U-19 Youth Championship =

Kejuaraan Remaja U-19 AFF 2018

Tournament details
- Host country: Indonesia
- Dates: 1–14 July
- Teams: 11 (from 1 sub-confederation)
- Venues: 2 (in 2 host cities)

Final positions
- Champions: Malaysia (1st title)
- Runners-up: Myanmar
- Third place: Indonesia
- Fourth place: Thailand

Tournament statistics
- Matches played: 29
- Goals scored: 105 (3.62 per match)
- Top scorer(s): (Myanmar) Win Naing Tun (7 goals)

The 2018 AFF U-19 Youth Championship was the 16th edition of the AFF U-19 Youth Championship, organised by ASEAN Football Federation. It was hosted by Indonesia during July 2018. Eleven out of the twelve member associations of the ASEAN Football Federation took part in the tournament featuring two groups of five and six teams.

Malaysia beat Myanmar 4–3 in the final for their first title in the championship.

== Participant teams ==
All of 12 teams from member associations of the ASEAN Football Federation were eligible for the tournament. Only Australia did not enter the tournament. A total of 11 teams from 11 member associations entered the tournament, listed below:

| Team | Association | App | Previous best performance |
|---|---|---|---|
| Brunei | FA Brunei DS | 8th | Group stage (7 times) |
| Cambodia | FF Cambodia | 10th | Group stage (9 times) |
| Indonesia | FA Indonesia | 9th | Winners (2013) |
| Laos | Lao FF | 10th | Third place (2002, 2005, 2015) |
| Malaysia | FA Malaysia | 12th | Runners-up (2003, 2005, 2006, 2007, 2017) |
| Myanmar | Myanmar FF | 12th | Winners (2003, 2005) |
| Philippines | Philippine FF | 8th | Group stage (7 times) |
| Singapore | FA Singapore | 11th | Third place (2003) |
| Thailand | FA Thailand | 14th | Winners (2002, 2009, 2011, 2015, 2017) |
| Timor-Leste | FF Timor-Leste | 7th | Third place (2013) |
| Vietnam | Vietnam FF | 14th | Winners (2007) |

Did not enter

Australia

== Venues ==
| Gresik | Sidoarjo |
|---|---|
| Gelora Joko Samudro Stadium | Gelora Delta Stadium |
| Capacity: 40,000 | Capacity: 35,000 |
Location of stadiums of the 2018 AFF U-19 Youth Championship

== Group stage ==
- All times listed are Indonesia Western Standard Time (UTC+7).

=== Group A ===
| Pos | Team | Pld | W | D | L | GF | GA | GD | Pts | Qualification |
|---|---|---|---|---|---|---|---|---|---|---|
| 1 | Thailand | 5 | 4 | 1 | 0 | 16 | 1 | +15 | 13 | Knockout stage |
| 2 | Indonesia (H) | 5 | 4 | 0 | 1 | 11 | 3 | +8 | 12 | Knockout stage |
| 3 | Vietnam | 5 | 2 | 2 | 1 | 11 | 4 | +7 | 8 | |
| 4 | Laos | 5 | 2 | 0 | 3 | 13 | 10 | +3 | 6 | |
| 5 | Philippines | 5 | 1 | 0 | 4 | 5 | 22 | −17 | 3 | |
| 6 | Singapore | 5 | 0 | 1 | 4 | 3 | 19 | −16 | 1 | |

Source: drawing result
(H) Hosts
1 July 2018
15:30

| Vietnam | 0–0 | Thailand |
|---|---|---|
| | Report |

Gelora Joko Samudro Stadium, Gresik
Attendance: 100
Referee: Razlan Jeffri Ali (Malaysia)
1 July 2018
19:00

| Singapore | 1–2 | Philippines |
|---|---|---|
| Syahadat 78' | Report | Tacardon 19', 90+4' |

Gelora Joko Samudro Stadium, Gresik
Attendance: 100
Referee: Khoun Virak (Cambodia)
1 July 2018
19:00

| Indonesia | 1–0 | Laos |
|---|---|---|
| Witan 30' | Report | Phasao (red card) 90+2' |

Gelora Delta Stadium, Sidoarjo
Attendance: 13,774
Referee: Myat Thu (Myanmar)

3 July 2018
15:30

| Thailand | 3–0 | Laos |
|---|---|---|
| Suphanat 17'; Mehti 35' (pen.); Korrawit 87' | Report | Bounphachan (yellow card) 70' (yellow-red card) |

Gelora Joko Samudro Stadium, Gresik
Attendance: 107
Referee: Thoriq Alkatiri (Indonesia)
3 July 2018
15:30

| Vietnam | 5–0 | Philippines |
|---|---|---|
| Lê Văn Nam 29', 50'; Lê Minh Bình 54', 85'; Nguyễn Hữu Thắng 71' | Report |

Gelora Delta Stadium, Sidoarjo
Attendance: 300
Referee: Amdillah Zainuddin (Brunei)
3 July 2018
19:00

| Indonesia | 4–0 | Singapore |
|---|---|---|
| Rafli 21', 61'; Saddil 70'; Rivaldo 80' | Report |

Gelora Delta Stadium, Sidoarjo
Attendance: 17,000
Referee: Clifford Daypuyat (Philippines)

5 July 2018
15:30

| Laos | 1–4 | Vietnam |
|---|---|---|
| Kydavone 90' | Report | Trần Danh Trung 25'; Xayasith 38' (o.g.); Đặng Văn Tới 45+2'; Nguyễn Hữu Thắng 75' |

Gelora Joko Samudro Stadium, Gresik
Attendance: 50
Referee: Myat Thu (Myanmar)
5 July 2018
15:30

| Thailand | 6–0 | Singapore |
|---|---|---|
| Pithak 5'; Mehti 27', 48'; Sittichok 35'; Suphanat 73'; Korrawit 78' | Report |

Gelora Delta Stadium, Sidoarjo
Attendance: 2,000
Referee: Khoun Virak (Cambodia)
5 July 2018
19:00

| Philippines | 1–4 | Indonesia |
|---|---|---|
| Pabualan 33' | Report | Saddil 82', 86'; Firza 83'; Rivaldo 90' |

Gelora Delta Stadium, Sidoarjo
Attendance: 16,950
Referee: Razlan Jeffri Ali (Malaysia)

7 July 2018
15:30

| Singapore | 0–5 | Laos |
|---|---|---|
| | Report | Kittisak 6'; Lextoxa 21'; Chitpasong 30'; Bounphachan 38', 62' |

Gelora Joko Samudro Stadium, Gresik
Referee: Thoriq Alkatiri (Indonesia)
7 July 2018
15:30

| Philippines | 0–5 | Thailand |
|---|---|---|
| | Report | Korrawit 37', 55', 84'; Pithak 61'; Narakorn 63' |

Gelora Delta Stadium, Sidoarjo
Attendance: 3,000
Referee: Amdillah Zainuddin (Brunei)
7 July 2018
19:00

| Indonesia | 1–0 | Vietnam |
|---|---|---|
| Rafli 81' | Report |

Gelora Delta Stadium, Sidoarjo
Attendance: 25,000
Referee: Razlan Jeffri Ali (Malaysia)

9 July 2018
15:30

| Laos | 7–2 | Philippines |
|---|---|---|
| Phoutthasone 4'; Lextoxa (red card) 26'; Bounphachan 35', 40', 47', 54'; Nilan 79', 85' | Report | Tacardon 17', 77'; Vergara (red card) 26'; Rey (yellow card) 58' (yellow-red card) |

Gelora Joko Samudro Stadium, Gresik
Attendance: 100
Referee: Thoriq Alkatiri (Indonesia)
9 July 2018
19:00

| Vietnam | 2–2 | Singapore |
|---|---|---|
| Nguyễn Hữu Thắng 17'; Lê Văn Nam 77' | Report | Akmal 62'; Syahadat 86' |

Gelora Joko Samudro Stadium, Gresik
Referee: Myat Thu (Myanmar)
9 July 2018
19:00

| Thailand | 2–1 | Indonesia |
|---|---|---|
| Nattawut 41'; Mehti 50' | Report | Rifad 84' |

Gelora Delta Stadium, Sidoarjo
Attendance: 26,000
Referee: Clifford Daypuyat (Philippines)

=== Group B ===
| Pos | Team | Pld | W | D | L | GF | GA | GD | Pts | Qualification |
|---|---|---|---|---|---|---|---|---|---|---|
| 1 | Malaysia | 4 | 3 | 1 | 0 | 6 | 1 | +5 | 10 | Knockout stage |
| 2 | Myanmar | 4 | 2 | 1 | 1 | 13 | 5 | +8 | 7 | Knockout stage |
| 3 | Cambodia | 4 | 2 | 0 | 2 | 8 | 7 | +1 | 6 | |
| 4 | Timor-Leste | 4 | 1 | 2 | 1 | 5 | 5 | 0 | 5 | |
| 5 | Brunei | 4 | 0 | 0 | 4 | 1 | 15 | −14 | 0 | |

Source: drawing result
2 July 2018
15:30

| Timor-Leste | 2–2 | Myanmar |
|---|---|---|
| Freitas 45' de Lima 60' | Report | Ye Yint Aung 9'; Win Naing Tun 86' |

Gelora Joko Samudro Stadium, Gresik
Attendance: 178
Referee: Wiwat Jumpaoon (Thailand)
2 July 2018
19:00

| Brunei | 0–5 | Cambodia |
|---|---|---|
| | Report | Kakada 3', 90'; Menghour 51', 65', 66' |

Gelora Joko Samudro Stadium, Gresik
Attendance: 100
Referee: Nguyễn Hiền Triết (Vietnam)

4 July 2018
15:30

| Cambodia | 0–2 | Malaysia |
|---|---|---|
| | Report | Shivan 39'; Akhyar 71' |

Gelora Joko Samudro Stadium, Gresik
Attendance: 50
Referee: Xaypaseuth Phongsanit (Laos)
4 July 2018
19:00

| Brunei | 0–1 | Timor-Leste |
|---|---|---|
| | Report | Freitas 45+3' |

Gelora Joko Samudro Stadium, Gresik
Referee: Oki Dwi Putra (Indonesia)

6 July 2018
15:30

| Malaysia | 2–0 | Brunei |
|---|---|---|
| Syahmi 5'; Nizarruddin 12' | Report |

Gelora Joko Samudro Stadium, Gresik
Referee: Wiwat Jumpaoon (Thailand)
6 July 2018
19:00

| Myanmar | 4–1 | Cambodia |
|---|---|---|
| Win Naing Tun 24', 52'; Myat Kaung Khant 75', 88' | Report | David 61' |

Gelora Joko Samudro Stadium, Gresik
Referee: Nguyễn Hiền Triết (Vietnam)

8 July 2018
15:30

| Myanmar | 7–1 | Brunei |
|---|---|---|
| Myat Kaung Khant 13', 24'; Pyae Sone Naing 21', 40'; Win Naing Tun 42', 57'; Hlawn Moe Oo 81' | Report | Rahimin 87' |

Gelora Joko Samudro Stadium, Gresik
Attendance: 50
Referee: Xaypaseuth Phongsanit (Laos)
8 July 2018
19:00

| Timor-Leste | 1–1 | Malaysia |
|---|---|---|
| de Lima 13' | Report | Akhyar 30' |

Gelora Joko Samudro Stadium, Gresik
Referee: Oki Dwi Putra (Indonesia)

10 July 2018
15:30

| Malaysia | 1–0 | Myanmar |
|---|---|---|
| Shivan 17' | Report |

Gelora Delta Stadium, Sidoarjo
Attendance: 100
Referee: Wiwat Jumpaoon (Thailand)
10 July 2018
15:30

| Cambodia | 2–1 | Timor-Leste |
|---|---|---|
| David 32'; Menghour 79' | Report | Garcia 90' |

Gelora Joko Samudro Stadium, Gresik
Referee: Oki Dwi Putra (Indonesia)

== Knockout stage ==
In the knockout stage, the penalty shoot-out is used to decide the winner if necessary.

=== Bracket ===
Semi-finals
12 July – Sidoarjo
Thailand | 0
Myanmar | 1
12 July – Sidoarjo
Malaysia (p) | 1 (3)
Indonesia | 1 (2)

Final
14 July – Sidoarjo
Myanmar | 3
Malaysia | 4
Third Place
14 July – Sidoarjo
Thailand | 1
Indonesia | 2

=== Semi-finals ===
12 July 2018
15:30

| Thailand | 0–1 | Myanmar |
|---|---|---|
| | Report | Win Naing Tun 86' |

Gelora Delta Stadium, Sidoarjo
Attendance: 10,000
Referee: Khuon Virak (Cambodia)
12 July 2018
19:00

| Malaysia | 1–1 | Indonesia |
|---|---|---|
| Syaiful 15' | Report | Egy 1' (pen.) |
Penalties
| Shivan (penalty scored); Nabil (penalty scored); Akif (penalty scored); Zafuan (penalty missed) | 3–2 | (penalty scored) Luthfi; (penalty scored) Rivaldo; (penalty missed) Witan; (penalty missed) Firza; (penalty missed) Hanis |

Gelora Delta Stadium, Sidoarjo
Attendance: 26,233
Referee: Clifford Daypuyat (Philippines)

=== Third place match ===
14 July 2018
15:30

| Thailand | 1–2 | Indonesia |
|---|---|---|
| Mehti 85' | Report | Feby 34'; Abimanyu 83' |

Gelora Delta Stadium, Sidoarjo
Attendance: 3,123
Referee: Xaypaseuth Phongsanit (Laos)

=== Final ===
14 July 2018
19:00

| Myanmar | 3–4 | Malaysia |
|---|---|---|
| Win Naing Tun 23'; Myat Kaung Khant 27', 31' | Report | Awang 4'; Akif 19', 90+3'; Shivan 76' |

Gelora Delta Stadium, Sidoarjo
Attendance: 600
Referee: Nguyễn Hiền Triết (Vietnam)

== Winner ==
2018 AFF U-19 Youth Championship Winners
(Malaysia)
Malaysia
1st title

== Awards ==
Top Scorer Award
(Myanmar) Win Naing Tun

== Incident ==
At the end of semi-finals match between Indonesia and Malaysia during the preparation for penalty shoot-out, the stadium suddenly faced a power outage. The Perusahaan Listrik Negara (PLN) explained that it is not caused from their power distribution since the stadium management only use PLN distribution outside the stadium. When the match was resumed and the penalty shoot-out ended with a score 3–2 against the host, dissatisfied Indonesian supporters began to throw bottles and rocks at the Malaysian team after their team failed to qualify to the finals which caused the Malaysian team to run to their dressing room for safety. The Football Association of Indonesia (PSSI) then sent a letter of apology to the Football Association of Malaysia (FAM) and promised such incident will never recurred again in the future tournament they host. A meeting was then held between Indonesian Sports Minister Imam Nahrawi and Malaysian Sports Minister Syed Saddiq in response towards the incident.

== Goalscorers ==
7 goals

- (Myanmar) Win Naing Tun

6 goals

- (Laos) Bounphachan Bounkong
- (Myanmar) Myat Kaung Khant

5 goals

- (Thailand) Korrawit Tasa
- (Thailand) Mehti Sarakham

4 goals

- (Cambodia) Kheang Menghour
- (Philippines) Fidel Tacardon

3 goals

- (Indonesia) Rafli Mursalim
- (Indonesia) Saddil Ramdani
- (Malaysia) Shivan Pillay Asokan
- (Vietnam) Lê Văn Nam
- (Vietnam) Nguyễn Hữu Thắng

2 goals

- (Cambodia) Narong Kakada
- (Cambodia) Nop David
- (Indonesia) Todd Rivaldo Ferre
- (Laos) Nilan
- (Malaysia) Akhyar Rashid
- (Malaysia) Nik Akif
- (Myanmar) Pyae Sone Naing
- (Singapore) Muhammad Syahadat Masnawi
- (Thailand) Pithak Phaphirom
- (Thailand) Suphanat Mueanta
- (Timor-Leste) Mouzinho de Lima
- (Timor-Leste) Paulo Gali
- (Vietnam) Lê Minh Bình

1 goal

- (Brunei) Muhammad Rahimin
- (Indonesia) Egy Maulana Vikri
- (Indonesia) Feby Eka Putra
- (Indonesia) Firza Andika
- (Indonesia) Rifad Marasabessy
- (Indonesia) Syahrian Abimanyu
- (Indonesia) Witan Sulaeman
- (Laos) Chitpasong Latthachack
- (Laos) Kittisak Phomvongsa
- (Laos) Kydavone Souvanny
- (Laos) Lextoxa Thongsavath
- (Laos) Phoutthasone Vongkosy
- (Malaysia) Awang Muhammad Faiz
- (Malaysia) Nizarrudin Jazi
- (Malaysia) Syahmi Zambri
- (Malaysia) Syaiful Alias
- (Myanmar) Hlawn Moe Oo
- (Myanmar) Ye Yint Aung
- (Philippines) Chester Pabualan
- (Singapore) Akmal Azman
- (Thailand) Narakorn Noomchansakul
- (Thailand) Nattawut Chootiwat
- (Thailand) Sittichok Paso
- (Timor-Leste) Celso Rebelo Garcia
- (Vietnam) Đặng Văn Tới
- (Vietnam) Trần Danh Trung

1 own goal

- (Laos) Xayasith Singsavang (playing against Vietnam)
