= Lê Văn Nam =

Vietnamese footballer (born 1999)

Personal information
- Full name: Lê Văn Nam
- Date of birth: 30 October 1999 (age 27)
- Place of birth: Ngọc Lặc, Thanh Hóa, Vietnam
- Height: 1.71 m (5 ft 7 in)
- Position: Striker

Team information
- Current team: Quảng Nam
- Number: 9

Youth career
- 2011–2018: Hà Nội

Senior career*
Years	Team	Apps	(Gls)
2019–2021	Hồng Lĩnh Hà Tĩnh	8	(2)
2020	→ Đắk Lắk (loan)	8	(3)
2022–	Quảng Nam	40	(13)

International career
2017–2018	Vietnam U19	14	(6)
- * Club domestic league appearances and goals as of 3 March 2024

Lê Văn Nam (born 30 October 1999) is a Vietnamese professional footballer who plays as a striker for V.League 1 club Quảng Nam.

== Early career ==
Born in Thanh Hóa, Văn Nam joined the youth academy of Hà Nội FC in 2012. With Hà Nội under-19s, he won the Vietnamese National U-19 Championship in 2016 and 2017, being named as the best player of the tournament in 2017.

== Club career ==
In 2019, Văn Nam joined Hồng Lĩnh Hà Tĩnh, a partner club of Hà Nội. During the 2019 V.League 2 season, he scored 2 goals as Hồng Lĩnh Hà Tĩnh promote to the V.League as league title winners.

In the second half of the 2020 season, Văn Nam was loaned to V.League 2 side Đắk Lắk. He scored 3 goals after 3 appearances, helping the club avoid relegation.

In 2022, Văn Nam joined V.League 2 side Quảng Nam. On 15 August 2023, he scored the first hat-trick in his career in Quảng Nam's 7–1 V.League 2 win against Bình Thuận. He finished the 2023 season being the V.League 2 with 10 goals, thus also played an important role to help his team finish as league champions.

== International career ==
In October 2018, Văn Nam was named in Vietnam U19 squad for the 2018 AFC U-19 Championship. He scored one goal during the tournament against Australia as Vietnam was eliminated from in the group stage.

== Honours ==
Hồng Lĩnh Hà Tĩnh

- V.League 2: (gold) 2019

Quảng Nam

- V.League 2: (gold) 2023

Individual

- Vietnamese National U-19 Championship best player: 2017
- V.League 2 top scorer: 2023
