= 2019 AFF U-22 Youth Championship squads =

Below are the squads for the 2019 AFF U-22 Youth Championship, which took place between 17 and 26 February 2019.

== Group A ==
=== Thailand ===
Head coach: (Brazil) Alexandre Gama

The final squad was announced on 4 February 2019.

No.	Pos.	Player	Date of birth (age)	Club
1	GK	Korraphat Nareechan	7 October 1997 (aged 21)	(Football Association of Thailand) Khon Kaen
28	GK	Kritsawat Kongkot	26 July 1999 (aged 19)	(Football Association of Thailand) Chainat Hornbill
30	GK	Jack Krause	24 June 1997 (aged 21)	(Football Association of Thailand) Sukhothai
2	DF	Sampan Kesi	3 July 1999 (aged 19)	(Football Association of Thailand) Phuket City
3	DF	Kritsada Nontharat	1 February 2001 (aged 18)	(Football Association of Thailand) Bangkok United
4	DF	Chatchai Saengdao	11 January 1997 (aged 22)	(Football Association of Thailand) Muangthong United
5	DF	Sarayut Sompim	23 March 1997 (aged 21)	(Football Association of Thailand) PTT Rayong
6	DF	Kittitach Praniti	30 April 1999 (aged 19)	(Football Association of Thailand) Phuket City
12	DF	Kittipong Sansanit	22 March 1999 (aged 19)	(Football Association of Thailand) Muangthong United
15	DF	Saringkan Promsupa (captain)	29 March 1997 (aged 21)	(Football Association of Thailand) Muangthong United
22	DF	Marco Ballini	12 June 1998 (aged 20)	(Football Association of Thailand) Chainat Hornbill
11	MF	Jedsadakorn Kowngam	13 March 1997 (aged 21)	(Football Association of Thailand) Army United
13	MF	Jaroensak Wonggorn	18 May 1997 (aged 21)	(Football Association of Thailand) Samut Prakan City
16	MF	Anon Samakorn	13 July 1998 (aged 20)	(Football Association of Thailand) Port
17	MF	Sakunchai Saengthopho	7 June 1999 (aged 19)	(Football Association of Thailand) Muangthong United
21	MF	Techin Muktarakosa	18 April 1997 (aged 21)	(Football Association of Thailand) Bangkok United
23	MF	Narachai Intha-naka	27 July 1999 (aged 19)	(Football Association of Thailand) Chiangmai
24	MF	Tanpisit Kukalamo	23 August 1997 (aged 21)	(Football Association of Thailand) Ubon United
25	MF	Reungyos Janchaichit	20 July 1998 (aged 20)	(Football Association of Thailand) Muangthong United
26	MF	Patcharapol Intanee	12 October 1998 (aged 20)	(Football Association of Thailand) Muangthong United
9	FW	Ritthidet Phensawat	21 March 1997 (aged 21)	(Football Association of Thailand) Phuket City
10	FW	Korrawit Tasa	7 April 2000 (aged 18)	(Football Association of Thailand) Muangthong United
29	FW	Sihanart Suttisak	30 January 1998 (aged 21)	(Football Association of Thailand) Udon Thani

=== Philippines ===
Head coach: (Philippines) Salvador Salvación

The final squad was announced on 15 February 2019.

No.	Pos.	Player	Date of birth (age)	Club
1	GK	Alexandre Arcilla	2 April 1998 (aged 20)	(Philippine Football Federation) Ateneo de Manila University
3	GK	Michael Asong	3 October 1998 (aged 20)	(Philippine Football Federation) San Beda University
22	GK	Kenny Balobo	22 September 1998 (aged 20)	(Philippine Football Federation) San Beda University
2	DF	Jordan Jarvis	17 April 1998 (aged 20)	(Football Association of Hong Kong, China) Eastern
4	DF	Dean Ebarle	20 April 1998 (aged 20)	(Philippine Football Federation) Kaya F.C.–Iloilo
5	DF	James Mansueto	19 September 1998 (aged 20)	(Philippine Football Federation) Lyceum of the Philippines University
12	DF	José Clariño	1 February 1997 (aged 22)	(Philippine Football Federation) University of the Philippines
13	DF	Ray Sanciangco	22 January 1998 (aged 21)	(Philippine Football Federation) University of the Philippines
14	DF	Winces Balbino	11 February 1997 (aged 22)	(Philippine Football Federation) Lyceum of the Philippines University
15	DF	Lawrence Baguio	21 May 1998 (aged 20)	(Philippine Football Federation) De La Salle–College of Saint Benilde
16	DF	Banjo Mahinay	16 February 1997 (aged 22)	(Philippine Football Federation) Lyceum of the Philippines University
21	DF	William Grierson	27 April 1998 (aged 20)	(Philippine Football Federation) Ateneo de Manila University
7	MF	Troy Limbo (captain)	17 November 1997 (aged 21)	(The Football Association) Sunderland RCA
8	MF	Jeremiah Borlongan	8 December 1998 (aged 20)	(Philippine Football Federation) University of the Philippines
10	MF	Dylan de Bruycker	5 December 1997 (aged 21)	(Philippine Football Federation) Ceres–Negros
17	MF	Kyle Magdato	10 July 1998 (aged 20)	(Philippine Football Federation) University of the Philippines
23	MF	Earl Laguerta	23 March 1997 (aged 21)	(Philippine Football Federation) De La Salle–College of Saint Benilde
24	MF	Vincent Lovitos	22 August 1998 (aged 20)	(Philippine Football Federation) De La Salle–College of Saint Benilde
28	MF	Daniel Saavedra	26 July 1997 (aged 21)	(Philippine Football Federation) University of the Philippines
30	MF	Jumbel Guinabang	18 July 1996 (aged 22)	(Philippine Football Federation) Arellano University
9	FW	Christian Lapas	10 November 1998 (aged 20)	(Philippine Football Federation) University of the Philippines
11	FW	Mark Winhoffer	1 March 1999 (aged 19)	(United States Soccer Federation) Yale University
18	FW	Rico Andes	14 March 1998 (aged 20)	(Philippine Football Federation) National University

=== Timor-Leste ===
Head coach: (Japan) Norio Tsukitate

No.	Pos.	Player	Date of birth (age)	Club
1	GK	Aderito Fernandes	15 May 1997 (aged 21)	(East Timor Football Federation) Ponta Leste
12	GK	Fernando da Costa	18 June 2000 (aged 18)	(East Timor Football Federation)
20	GK	Georgino Mendonça	16 March 2002 (aged 16)	(East Timor Football Federation)
2	DF	Julião Mendonça	2 July 1998 (aged 20)	(East Timor Football Federation) Boavista
3	DF	José Guterres	24 April 1998 (aged 20)	(East Timor Football Federation) Boavista
4	DF	Candido Oliveira	2 December 1997 (aged 21)	(East Timor Football Federation) Ponta Leste
5	DF	João Panji	29 October 2000 (aged 18)	(East Timor Football Federation) Assalam
13	DF	Gumario Moreira	18 October 2001 (aged 17)	(East Timor Football Federation) Boavista
16	DF	Yohanes Gusmão	1 October 2000 (aged 18)	(East Timor Football Federation) SLB Laulara
18	DF	Filomeno Junior	5 August 2000 (aged 18)	(East Timor Football Federation)
22	DF	Nelson Viegas	24 December 1999 (aged 19)	(East Timor Football Federation)
6	MF	José Oliveira	28 October 1997 (aged 21)	(East Timor Football Federation) SLB Laulara
14	MF	Kornelis Nahak	12 January 2001 (aged 18)	(East Timor Football Federation)
17	MF	Expedito Soares	11 October 2002 (aged 16)	(East Timor Football Federation)
19	MF	Feliciano Gonçalves	11 February 1997 (aged 22)	(East Timor Football Federation)
23	MF	Osvaldo Belo	18 October 2000 (aged 18)	(East Timor Football Federation) Karketu Dili
7	FW	Rufino Gama (captain)	20 June 1998 (aged 20)	(East Timor Football Federation) Karketu Dili
8	FW	Mouzinho	26 June 2002 (aged 16)	(East Timor Football Federation)
9	FW	Rivaldo Correia	13 March 2000 (aged 18)	(East Timor Football Federation)
10	FW	Henrique Cruz	6 December 1997 (aged 21)	(East Timor Football Federation) Boavista
11	FW	Gelvánio Angelo	8 October 1998 (aged 20)	(East Timor Football Federation) Karketu Dili
21	FW	Frangcyatma Alves	27 January 1997 (aged 22)	(East Timor Football Federation)

=== Vietnam ===
Head coach: (Vietnam) Nguyễn Quốc Tuấn

The final squad was announced on 14 February 2019.

No.	Pos.	Player	Date of birth (age)	Club
1	GK	Y Êli Niê	8 January 2001 (aged 18)	(Vietnam Football Federation) HAGL
13	GK	Dương Tùng Lâm	22 May 1999 (aged 19)	(Vietnam Football Federation) Hanoi B
23	GK	Phan Văn Biểu	12 March 1998 (aged 20)	(Vietnam Football Federation) SHB Da Nang
2	DF	Ngô Tùng Quốc	27 January 1998 (aged 21)	(Vietnam Football Federation) Ho Chi Minh City
3	DF	Trương Dũ Đạt	25 July 1997 (aged 21)	(Vietnam Football Federation) Becamex Binh Duong
4	DF	Nguyễn Văn Đạt	22 May 1998 (aged 20)	(Vietnam Football Federation) Hanoi B
16	DF	Nguyễn Văn Hạnh	4 April 1998 (aged 20)	(Vietnam Football Federation) Haiphong
18	DF	Nguyễn Hoàng Duy	4 June 1999 (aged 19)	(Vietnam Football Federation) Dong Thap
20	DF	Bùi Hoàng Việt Anh	1 January 1999 (aged 20)	(Vietnam Football Federation) Hanoi B
21	DF	Nguyễn Hùng Thiện Đức	8 December 1999 (aged 19)	(Vietnam Football Federation) Becamex Binh Duong
22	DF	Lê Văn Xuân	27 February 1999 (aged 19)	(Vietnam Football Federation) Hanoi B
6	MF	Bùi Tiến Dụng	23 November 1998 (aged 20)	(Vietnam Football Federation) SHB Da Nang
10	MF	Trần Bảo Toàn	14 July 2000 (aged 18)	(Vietnam Football Federation) HAGL
11	MF	Tống Anh Tỷ	24 January 1997 (aged 22)	(Vietnam Football Federation) Becamex Binh Duong
12	MF	Lương Hoàng Nam	2 March 1997 (aged 21)	(Vietnam Football Federation) HAGL
14	MF	Dụng Quang Nho	1 January 2000 (aged 19)	(Vietnam Football Federation) HAGL
15	MF	Nguyễn Hữu Thắng	19 May 2000 (aged 18)	(Vietnam Football Federation) Hue
17	MF	Phan Thanh Hậu	12 January 1997 (aged 22)	(Vietnam Football Federation) HAGL
5	FW	Trần Đức Nam	12 November 1998 (aged 20)	(Vietnam Football Federation) Hanoi B
7	FW	Lê Minh Bình	25 December 1999 (aged 19)	(Vietnam Football Federation) HAGL
8	FW	Trần Thanh Sơn (captain)	30 December 1997 (aged 21)	(Vietnam Football Federation) HAGL
9	FW	Lê Xuân Tú	6 September 1999 (aged 19)	(Vietnam Football Federation) Hanoi B
19	FW	Trần Danh Trung	3 October 2000 (aged 18)	(Vietnam Football Federation) Hue

== Group B ==
=== Cambodia ===
Head coach: (Argentina) Félix Dalmás

No.	Pos.	Player	Date of birth (age)	Club
1	GK	Keo Soksela	1 August 1997 (aged 21)	(Football Federation of Cambodia) Visakha
22	GK	Hul Kimhuy	7 April 2000 (aged 18)	(Football Federation of Cambodia) Boeung Ket
25	GK	Saveng Samnang	15 October 2000 (aged 18)	(Football Federation of Cambodia) Phnom Penh Crown
2	DF	Ken Chansopheak	15 June 1998 (aged 20)	(Football Federation of Cambodia) Phnom Penh Crown
3	DF	Sath Rosib	7 July 1997 (aged 21)	(Football Federation of Cambodia) Boeung Ket
4	DF	Ly Vahed	26 December 1998 (aged 20)	(Football Federation of Cambodia) Boeung Ket
6	DF	Seut Baraing	29 September 1999 (aged 19)	(Football Federation of Cambodia) Phnom Penh Crown
14	DF	Tes Sambath	20 October 2000 (aged 18)	(Football Federation of Cambodia) Boeung Ket
15	DF	Yue Safy	8 November 2000 (aged 18)	(Football Federation of Cambodia) Phnom Penh Crown
19	DF	Cheng Meng	27 February 1998 (aged 20)	(Football Federation of Cambodia) Visakha
27	DF	Ouk Sovann	15 May 1998 (aged 20)	(Football Federation of Cambodia) Phnom Penh Crown
28	DF	Chhong Bunnath	28 November 1998 (aged 20)	(Football Federation of Cambodia) Angkor Tiger
33	DF	Sin Sophanat	20 April 1997 (aged 21)	(Football Federation of Cambodia) Visakha
8	MF	Orn Chanpolin (captain)	15 March 1998 (aged 20)	(Football Federation of Cambodia) Phnom Penh Crown
11	MF	Mat Sakrovy	5 November 1998 (aged 20)	(Football Federation of Cambodia) Visakha
12	MF	Teat Kimheng	1 May 2000 (aged 18)	(Football Federation of Cambodia) Visakha
18	MF	Brak Thiva	5 December 1998 (aged 20)	(Football Federation of Cambodia) Phnom Penh Crown
20	MF	Yeu Muslim	25 December 1998 (aged 20)	(Football Federation of Cambodia) Phnom Penh Crown
23	MF	In Sodavid	2 July 1998 (aged 20)	(Football Federation of Cambodia) Phnom Penh Crown
7	FW	Sin Kakada	29 July 2000 (aged 18)	(Football Federation of Cambodia) Visakha
9	FW	Narong Kakada	5 July 1999 (aged 19)	(Football Federation of Cambodia) National Defense
10	FW	Kheang Menghour	1 June 2000 (aged 18)	(Football Federation of Cambodia) Svay Rieng
17	FW	Sieng Chanthea	9 September 2002 (aged 16)	(Football Federation of Cambodia) Cambodia Academy Team

=== Myanmar ===
Head coach: (Bulgaria) Velizar Popov

The final squad was announced on 14 February 2019.

No.	Pos.	Player	Date of birth (age)	Club
1	GK	Soe Arkar	1 October 1997 (aged 21)	(Myanmar Football Federation) Magwe
18	GK	Phone Thit Sar Min (captain)	16 November 1998 (aged 20)	(Myanmar Football Federation) Shan United
23	GK	Sann Satt Naing	4 September 1998 (aged 20)	(Myanmar Football Federation) Yangon United
2	DF	Hein Phyo Win	19 September 1998 (aged 20)	(Myanmar Football Federation) Shan United
3	DF	Zin Ye Naung	12 August 1997 (aged 21)	(Myanmar Football Federation) ISPE
4	DF	Win Moe Kyaw	1 February 1997 (aged 22)	(Myanmar Football Federation) Magwe
5	DF	Ye Yint Aung	26 February 1998 (aged 20)	(Myanmar Football Federation) Yadanarbon
12	DF	Aung Wunna Soe	19 April 2000 (aged 18)	(Myanmar Football Federation) Yadanarbon
13	DF	Ye Min Thu	18 February 1998 (aged 20)	(Myanmar Football Federation) Shan United
15	DF	Soe Moe Kyaw	23 March 1999 (aged 19)	(Myanmar Football Federation) Ayeyawady United
16	DF	Zwe Htet Min	20 June 2000 (aged 18)	(Myanmar Football Federation) Shan United
6	MF	Nan Htike Zaw	3 June 1999 (aged 19)	(Myanmar Football Federation) Ayeyawady United
7	MF	Lwin Moe Aung	10 December 1999 (aged 19)	(Myanmar Football Federation) Ayeyawady United
8	MF	Myat Kaung Khant	15 July 2000 (aged 18)	(Myanmar Football Federation) Yadanarbon
11	MF	Hein Htet Aung	5 October 2001 (aged 17)	(Myanmar Football Federation) Hanthawaddy United
14	MF	Myat Htun Thit	3 September 2000 (aged 18)	(Myanmar Football Federation) Magwe
17	MF	Aung Naing Win	1 June 1997 (aged 21)	(Myanmar Football Federation) Yadanarbon
19	MF	Soe Lwin Lwin	13 August 1998 (aged 20)	(Myanmar Football Federation) Magwe
20	MF	Zayar Naing	28 August 1998 (aged 20)	(Myanmar Football Federation) Magwe
21	MF	Zwe Thet Paing	28 November 1998 (aged 20)	(Myanmar Football Federation) Shan United
9	FW	Htet Phyo Wai	21 January 2000 (aged 19)	(Myanmar Football Federation) Shan United
10	FW	Win Naing Tun	3 May 2000 (aged 18)	(Myanmar Football Federation) Yadanarbon
22	FW	Hlwan Moe Oo	4 March 2000 (aged 18)	(Myanmar Football Federation) Yangon United

=== Malaysia ===
Head coach: (Malaysia) Ong Kim Swee

The final squad was announced on 14 February 2019.

No.	Pos.	Player	Date of birth (age)	Club
1	GK	Azri Ghani	30 April 1999 (aged 19)	(Football Association of Malaysia) Felda United
22	GK	Damien Lim	15 February 1997 (aged 22)	(Football Association of Malaysia) Kelantan
23	GK	Haziq Nadzli	6 January 1998 (aged 21)	(Football Association of Malaysia) Johor Darul Ta'zim
2	DF	Amirul Ashraf	22 January 1998 (aged 21)	(Football Association of Malaysia) UiTM
3	DF	Dominic Tan	12 March 1997 (aged 21)	(Football Association of Malaysia) Johor Darul Ta'zim
4	DF	Ariff Ar-Rasyid	28 December 1998 (aged 20)	(Football Association of Malaysia) PKNS
5	DF	Evan Wensley	8 August 1998 (aged 20)	(Football Association of Malaysia) Sabah
8	DF	Shahrul Nizam	25 May 1998 (aged 20)	(Football Association of Malaysia) Kelantan
12	DF	Tasnim Fitri	19 January 1999 (aged 20)	(Football Association of Malaysia) Felda United
13	DF	Dinesh Rajasingam	13 February 1998 (aged 21)	(Football Association of Malaysia) Pahang
14	DF	Danish Haziq	12 September 1997 (aged 21)	(Football Association of Malaysia) Negeri Sembilan
15	DF	Hariz Kamaruddin	2 July 1997 (aged 21)	(Football Association of Malaysia) Johor Darul Ta'zim II
6	MF	Nabil Hakim	9 February 1999 (aged 20)	(Football Association of Malaysia) Kuala Lumpur
7	MF	Nik Akif	11 May 1999 (aged 19)	(Football Association of Malaysia) Kelantan
9	MF	Thivandaran Karnan	8 March 1999 (aged 19)	(Football Association of Malaysia) PJ City
19	MF	Danial Haqim	29 August 1998 (aged 20)	(Football Association of Malaysia) Kelantan
20	MF	Nazirul Afif	20 April 1997 (aged 21)	(Football Association of Malaysia) Perak
10	FW	Hadi Fayyadh	22 January 2000 (aged 19)	(Japan Football Association) Fagiano Okayama
11	FW	Jafri Chew	11 June 1997 (aged 21)	(Football Association of Malaysia) PKNS
16	FW	Ariusdius Jais	7 July 1998 (aged 20)	(Football Association of Malaysia) Sabah
17	FW	Nik Azli	26 January 1997 (aged 22)	(Football Association of Malaysia) Kelantan
18	FW	Izzan Syahmi	23 February 1997 (aged 21)	(Football Association of Malaysia) Terengganu
21	FW	Kogileswaran Raj	21 September 1998 (aged 20)	(Football Association of Malaysia) Pahang

=== Indonesia ===
Head coach: (Indonesia) Indra Sjafri

The final squad was announced on 13 February 2019.

No.	Pos.	Player	Date of birth (age)	Club
1	GK	Muhammad Riyandi	3 January 2000 (aged 19)	(Football Association of Indonesia) Barito Putera
2	DF	Andy Setyo (captain)	16 September 1997 (aged 21)	(Football Association of Indonesia) TIRA-Persikabo
3	FW	Marinus Wanewar	24 February 1997 (aged 21)	(Football Association of Indonesia) Persipura
4	DF	Nurhidayat	5 April 1999 (aged 19)	(Football Association of Indonesia) Bhayangkara
5	DF	Bagas Adi	8 March 1997 (aged 21)	(Football Association of Indonesia) Bhayangkara
6	MF	Rafi Syarahil	15 November 2000 (aged 18)	(Football Association of Indonesia) Barito Putera
7	MF	Luthfi Kamal	1 March 1999 (aged 19)	(Football Association of Indonesia) Mitra Kukar
8	FW	Witan Sulaeman	8 October 2001 (aged 17)	(Football Association of Indonesia) PPLP Ragunan
9	FW	Dimas Drajad	30 March 1997 (aged 21)	(Football Association of Indonesia) TIRA-Persikabo
10	FW	Osvaldo Haay	1 May 1997 (aged 21)	(Football Association of Indonesia) Persebaya
11	DF	Firza Andika	11 May 1999 (aged 19)	(Royal Belgian Football Association) Tubize
12	GK	Awan Setho	20 March 1997 (aged 21)	(Football Association of Indonesia) Bhayangkara
13	DF	Rachmat Irianto	3 September 1999 (aged 19)	(Football Association of Indonesia) Persebaya Surabaya
14	DF	Asnawi Mangkualam	4 October 1999 (aged 19)	(Football Association of Indonesia) PSM Makassar
15	DF	Fredyan Wahyu	11 April 1998 (aged 20)	(Football Association of Indonesia) PSMS Medan
16	DF	Samuel Christianson	31 July 1999 (aged 19)	(Football Association of Indonesia) Sriwijaya
17	FW	Billy Keraf	8 May 1997 (aged 21)	(Football Association of Indonesia) Persib
18	MF	Gian Zola	5 August 1998 (aged 20)	(Football Association of Indonesia) Persib
19	MF	Hanif Sjahbandi	7 April 1997 (aged 21)	(Football Association of Indonesia) Arema
20	GK	Satria Tama	23 January 1997 (aged 22)	(Football Association of Indonesia) Madura United
21	MF	Kadek Agung	25 June 1998 (aged 20)	(Football Association of Indonesia) Bali United
22	MF	Todd Rivaldo Ferre	15 March 1999 (aged 19)	(Football Association of Indonesia) Persipura
23	DF	Sani Rizki Fauzi	7 January 1998 (aged 21)	(Football Association of Indonesia) Bhayangkara
