= Fredyan Wahyu =

Indonesian footballer

Personal information
- Full name: Fredyan Wahyu Sugiantoro
- Date of birth: 11 April 1998 (age 28)
- Place of birth: Boyolali, Indonesia
- Height: 1.66 m (5 ft 5 in)
- Position: Right-back

Team information
- Current team: Kendal Tornado
- Number: 46

Youth career
- 2014–2015: Persis Solo
- 2016: PS TNI

Senior career*
Years	Team	Apps	(Gls)
2017–2019	PSMS Medan	50	(3)
2019–2024	PSIS Semarang	102	(8)
2024–2026	Malut United	11	(0)
2026–	Kendal Tornado	1	(0)

International career
2019	Indonesia U23	2	(0)
Medal record
Men's football
Representing Indonesia
AFF U-22 Youth Championship
Winner	2019 Cambodia	Team
- * Club domestic league appearances and goals as of 12 September 2026

Fredyan Wahyu Sugiantoro (born 11 April 1998), commonly known as Ucil, is an Indonesian professional footballer who plays as a right-back for Championship club Kendal Tornado.

== Club career ==
He started his football career with Persis Solo, and became captain Persis Youth in the 2014 Soeratin Cup.

In 2016, he joined the PS TNI U21 who won the 2016 Indonesia Soccer Championship U-21.

2017, Ucil play with PSMS Medan who competed in 2017 Liga 2. He with his club managed to become runner-up 2017 Liga 2 and got promotion to 2018 Liga 1.

=== PSIS Semarang ===
On 10 May 2019, he signed two-year contract with Liga 1 club PSIS Semarang to play in 2019 season. On 16 May, Fredyan made his league debut in a 1–2 lose over Kalteng Putra at Moch. Soebroto Stadium, Magelang. He scored his first goal for the club on 7 March 2020 in a 2–3 winning match against Persela Lamongan at Surajaya Stadium, Lamongan.

On 4 September 2021, Fredyan started his match in the 2021–22 Liga 1 season for PSIS Semarang in a 1–0 win over Persela, he played full 90 minutes. On 15 October 2021, he scored in a 3–0 win over Persik Kediri.

=== Malut United ===
On 12 June 2024, Malut United announced Fredyan Wahyu as Laskar Kie Raha's newest recruit ahead of 2024–25 Liga 1.

== Career statistics ==
=== Club ===
As of 12 September 2026

Club	Season	League			Cup		Continental		Other		Total	
Club	Season	Division	Apps	Goals	Apps	Goals	Apps	Goals	Apps	Goals	Apps	Goals
PSMS Medan	2017	Liga 2	21	2	0	0	–		0	0	21	2
PSMS Medan	2018	Liga 1	29	1	0	0	–		0	0	29	1
PSMS Medan	Total		50	3	0	0	0	0	0	0	50	3
PSIS Semarang	2019	Liga 1	28	0	0	0	–		0	0	28	0
PSIS Semarang	2020	Liga 1	2	1	0	0	–		0	0	2	1
PSIS Semarang	2021–22	Liga 1	16	1	0	0	–		4 (Note: Appearances in Menpora Cup.)	0	20	1
PSIS Semarang	2022–23	Liga 1	28	4	0	0	–		7 (Note: Appearances in Indonesia President's Cup.)	0	35	4
PSIS Semarang	2023–24	Liga 1	28	2	0	0	–		0	0	28	2
PSIS Semarang	Total		102	8	0	0	–		11	0	113	8
Malut United	2024–25	Liga 1	11	0	0	0	–		0	0	11	0
Malut United	2025–26	Super League	0	0	0	0	–		0	0	0	0
Kendal Tornado	2026–27	Championship	1	0	0	0	–		0	0	1	0
Career total			164	11	0	0	0	0	11	0	175	11

== Honours ==
=== Clubs ===
Persis Solo Junior

- Soeratin Cup runner-up: 2014

PS TNI U-21

- Indonesia Soccer Championship U-21: 2016

PSMS Medan

- Liga 2 runner-up: 2017
- Indonesia President's Cup 4th place: 2018

=== International ===
Indonesia U-22

- AFF U-22 Youth Championship: 2019
