= 2018 AFC U-19 Championship =

Piala Asia U-19 2018

Tournament details
- Host country: Indonesia
- Dates: 18 October – 4 November
- Teams: 16 (from 1 confederation)
- Venues: 3 (in 3 host cities)

Final positions
- Champions: Saudi Arabia (3rd title)
- Runners-up: South Korea

Tournament statistics
- Matches played: 31
- Goals scored: 117 (3.77 per match)
- Attendance: 175,034 (5,646 per match)
- Top scorer: (Qatar) Abdulrasheed Umaru (7 goals)
- Best player: (Saudi Arabia) Turki Al-Ammar
- Fair play award: Saudi Arabia

The 2018 AFC U-19 Championship was the 40th edition of the biennial international youth football championship organised by the Asian Football Confederation (AFC) for the men's under-19 national teams of Asia. It took place in Indonesia, which was appointed as the host by the AFC on 25 July 2017, between 18 October and 4 November 2018. A total of 16 teams played in the tournament.

The top four teams of the tournament qualified for the 2019 FIFA U-20 World Cup in Poland as the AFC representatives. Saudi Arabia won their third title, and qualified together with runners-up South Korea and semi-finalists Qatar and Japan, which were the defending champions but eliminated by Saudi Arabia.

== Qualification ==
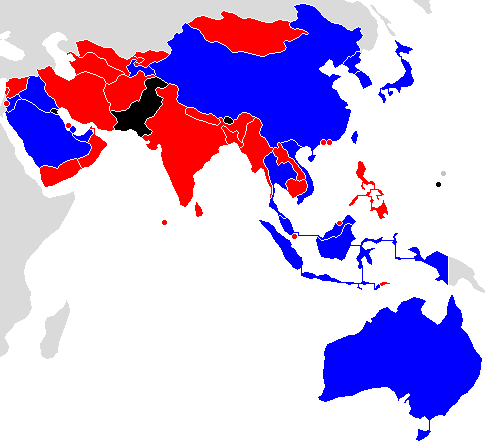
Qualified for 2018 AFC U-19 Championship Failed to qualify Disqualified or withdrew Not an AFC member

=== Qualification process ===
Qualification matches were played between 24 October and 8 November 2017.

Although Indonesia had already qualified automatically as hosts, they also participated in the qualifiers and finished third place after going down 0–3 and 1–4 loss to South Korea and Malaysia sides respectively.

Chinese Taipei returned to the tournament finals for the first time since 1974 as one of the best group runners-up.

The 2018 qualifiers also witnessed a unique situation where two teams had to go to penalties to determine the higher-position team. It happened in Group C after Qatar and Iraq were tied in all tie-breaking criteria and both of them played among each other in the last match. Qatar won the penalties and finished top of the group while Iraq finished second.

Twelve out of 2018 qualified sixteen teams played in the 2016 finals.

=== Qualified teams ===
The following 16 teams qualified for the final tournament.

Team	Qualified as	Appearance	Previous best performance
Indonesia	Hosts	17th	Champions (1961)
United Arab Emirates	Group A winners	14th	Champions (2008)
Tajikistan	Group B winners	4th	Quarter-finals (2016)
Qatar	Group C winners	14th	Champions (2014)
Saudi Arabia	Group D winners	14th	Champions (1986, 1992)
Jordan	Group E winners	7th	Fourth place (2006)
South Korea	Group F winners	38th	Champions (1959, 1960, 1963, 1978, 1980, 1982, 1990, 1996, 1998, 2002, 2004, 2012)
China	Group G winners	18th	Champions (1985)
Vietnam	Group H winners	19th (Note: Vietnam between 1959 and 1974 were to play at AFC tournaments as South Vietnam. A separate North Vietnam state did not join FIFA and they mostly played against other communist and communist-sympathising countries. The Vietnam's 19 appearances included 11 appearances as South Vietnam.)	Semi-finals (2016)
Japan	Group I winners	37th	Champions (2016)
Australia	Group J winners	7th	Runners-up (2010)
Iraq	Group C runners-up (Note: The five best runners-up qualified for the final tournament.)	17th	Champions (1975, 1977, 1978, 1988, 2000)
Thailand	Group I runners-up	33rd	Champions (1962, 1969)
North Korea	Group J runners-up	13th	Champions (1976, 2006, 2010)
Chinese Taipei	Group H runners-up	10th	Third place (1966)
Malaysia	Group F runners-up	23rd	Runners-up (1959, 1960, 1968)

== Venues ==
The matches were played in three venues around Greater Jakarta. The Gelora Bung Karno Stadium was also originally planned for the semi-finals and the final matches before it was changed to Pakansari Stadium due to several factors.

Jakarta	Cibinong	Bekasi
Gelora Bung Karno	Pakansari	Patriot Candrabhaga
Capacity: 77,200	Capacity: 30,000	Capacity: 30,000
2018 AFC U-19 Championship is located in West Java

== Draw ==
The draw was held on 18 May 2018, 15:00 WIB (UTC+7), at the Fairmont Hotel in Jakarta. The 16 teams were drawn into four groups of four teams. The teams were seeded according to their performance in the 2016 AFC U-19 Championship final tournament and qualification, with the hosts Indonesia automatically seeded and assigned to Position A1 in the draw.

Pot 1	Pot 2	Pot 3	Pot 4
1. Indonesia (hosts); 2. Japan; 3. Saudi Arabia; 4. Vietnam	5. Iraq; 6. Tajikistan; 7. South Korea; 8. United Arab Emirates	9. Australia; 10. Qatar; 11. China; 12. Thailand	13. North Korea; 14. Jordan; 15. Malaysia; 16. Chinese Taipei

== Squads ==
Players born on or after 1 January 1999 were eligible to compete in the tournament. Each team must register a squad of minimum 18 players and maximum 23 players, minimum three of whom must be goalkeepers.

== Group stage ==
The top two teams of each group advanced to the quarter-finals.

Tiebreakers

Teams were ranked according to points (3 points for a win, 1 point for a draw, 0 points for a loss), and if tied on points, the following tie-breaking criteria were applied, in the order given, to determine the rankings:

1. Points in head-to-head matches among tied teams;
2. Goal difference in head-to-head matches among tied teams;
3. Goals scored in head-to-head matches among tied teams;
4. If more than two teams are tied, and after applying all head-to-head criteria above, a subset of teams are still tied, all head-to-head criteria above are reapplied exclusively to this subset of teams;
5. Goal difference in all group matches;
6. Goals scored in all group matches;
7. Penalty shoot-out if only two teams were tied and they met in the last round of the group;
8. Disciplinary points (yellow card = 1 point, red card as a result of two yellow cards = 3 points, direct red card = 3 points, yellow card followed by direct red card = 4 points);
9. Drawing of lots.

All times are local, WIB (UTC+7).

=== Group A ===
Pos	Team	Pld	W	D	L	GF	GA	GD	Pts	Qualification
1	Qatar	3	2	0	1	11	7	+4	6 (Note: Head-to-head results: United Arab Emirates 2–1 Qatar, Qatar 6–5 Indonesia, Indonesia 1–0 United Arab Emirates. Head-to-head standings: Qatar: 3 pts, 0 GD, 7 GF; Indonesia: 3 pts, 0 GD, 6 GF; United Arab Emirates: 3 pts, 0 GD, 2 GF)	Knockout stage
2	Indonesia (H)	3	2	0	1	9	7	+2	6	Knockout stage
3	United Arab Emirates	3	2	0	1	10	3	+7	6	
4	Chinese Taipei	3	0	0	3	2	15	−13	0	

Source: AFC
Rules for classification: Group stage tiebreakers
(H) Hosts
Notes:
18 October 2018
16:00

United Arab Emirates	2–1	Qatar
Fawzi 16'; Al. Saleh 41'	Report	Umaru 36'

Gelora Bung Karno Stadium, Jakarta
Attendance: 2,124
Referee: Ahmed Al-Ali (Jordan)
18 October 2018
19:00

Indonesia	3–1	Chinese Taipei
Egy 50'; Witan 70', 89'	Report	Wang Chung-yu 53'

Gelora Bung Karno Stadium, Jakarta
Attendance: 17,320
Referee: Mooud Bonyadifard (Iran)

21 October 2018
16:00

Chinese Taipei	1–8	United Arab Emirates
Wu Yen-shu 74'	Report	Fawzi 10'; Al. Saleh 20', 67'; Rashed 35', 75'; Mubarak 51', 59'; Al-Naqbi 70'

Gelora Bung Karno Stadium, Jakarta
Attendance: 4,781
Referee: Sherzod Kasimov (Uzbekistan)
21 October 2018
19:00

Qatar	6–5	Indonesia
Ali 11', 51'; Umaru 14', 41', 56'; Waad 24'	Report	Luthfi 28'; Ferre 65', 73', 81'; Saddil 69'

Gelora Bung Karno Stadium, Jakarta
Attendance: 38,217
Referee: Sivakorn Pu-udom (Thailand)

24 October 2018
19:00

Indonesia	1–0	United Arab Emirates
Witan 23'	Report

Gelora Bung Karno Stadium, Jakarta
Attendance: 30,022
Referee: Kim Hee-gon (South Korea)
24 October 2018
19:00

Qatar	4–0	Chinese Taipei
Mansour 57'; Ali 61', 77'; Umaru 86' (pen.)	Report

Pakansari Stadium, Cibinong
Attendance: 35
Referee: Rowan Arumughan (India)

=== Group B ===
Pos	Team	Pld	W	D	L	GF	GA	GD	Pts	Qualification
1	Japan	3	3	0	0	13	3	+10	9	Knockout stage
2	Thailand	3	1	1	1	6	7	−1	4	Knockout stage
3	North Korea	3	1	0	2	4	7	−3	3	
4	Iraq	3	0	1	2	3	9	−6	1	

Source: AFC
Rules for classification: Group stage tiebreakers
19 October 2018
16:00

Iraq	3–3	Thailand
Abdulridha 37'; Ramadhan 42'; Abdulkareem 66'	Report	Kritsada 26'; Korawich 87'; Suphanat 90+4'

Pakansari Stadium, Cibinong
Attendance: 50
Referee: Rowan Arumughan (India)
19 October 2018
19:00

Japan	5–2	North Korea
K. Saito 8'; Ito 19'; Kubo 65'; Miyashiro 89'; Abe 90+3'	Report	Kye Tam 36'; Kang Kuk-chol 41' (pen.)

Pakansari Stadium, Cibinong
Attendance: 35
Referee: Khamis Al-Kuwari (Qatar)

22 October 2018
16:00

North Korea	1–0	Iraq
Pak Kwang-chon 55'	Report

Pakansari Stadium, Cibinong
Attendance: 52
Referee: Hussein Abo Yehia (Lebanon)
22 October 2018
19:00

Thailand	1–3	Japan
Suphanat 54'	Report	Miyashiro 27', 44'; K. Saito 42'

Pakansari Stadium, Cibinong
Attendance: 134
Referee: Mohammed Al-Hoish (Saudi Arabia)

25 October 2018
16:00

Japan	5–0	Iraq
Taki 10'; Tagawa 27'; Hara 34', 77'; K. Saito 85'	Report

Pakansari Stadium, Cibinong
Attendance: 138
Referee: Sherzod Kasimov (Uzbekistan)
25 October 2018
16:00

Thailand	2–1	North Korea
Sampan 38'; Korawich 78'	Report	Kang Kuk-chol 45'

Patriot Candrabhaga Stadium, Bekasi
Attendance: 70
Referee: Hanna Hattab (Syria)

=== Group C ===
Pos	Team	Pld	W	D	L	GF	GA	GD	Pts	Qualification
1	South Korea	3	2	1	0	7	3	+4	7	Knockout stage
2	Australia	3	1	2	0	4	3	+1	5	Knockout stage
3	Jordan	3	1	1	1	4	5	−1	4	
4	Vietnam	3	0	0	3	3	7	−4	0	

Source: AFC
Rules for classification: Group stage tiebreakers
19 October 2018
16:00

Vietnam	1–2	Jordan
Nhâm Mạnh Dũng 21'	Report	Bani Atieh 29'; Al-Zu'bi 89'

Patriot Candrabhaga Stadium, Bekasi
Attendance: 95
Referee: Yudai Yamamoto (Japan)
19 October 2018
19:00

South Korea	1–1	Australia
Jeon Se-jin 52'	Report	Najjarine 89'

Patriot Candrabhaga Stadium, Bekasi
Attendance: 151
Referee: Mohammed Al-Hoish (Saudi Arabia)

22 October 2018
16:00

Australia	2–1	Vietnam
Thurgate 37'; Folami 76'	Report	Lê Văn Nam 85'

Patriot Candrabhaga Stadium, Bekasi
Attendance: 44
Referee: Omar Al-Yaqoubi (Oman)
22 October 2018
19:00

Jordan	1–3	South Korea
Hani 77'	Report	Cho Young-wook 3'; Jeon Se-jin 79'; Choi Jun 90+2'

Patriot Candrabhaga Stadium, Bekasi
Attendance: 79
Referee: Mooud Bonyadifard (Iran)

25 October 2018
19:00

Vietnam	1–3	South Korea
Lê Xuân Tú 13'	Report	Cho Young-wook 45' (pen.), 90+4' (pen.); Kim Hyun-woo 77'

Patriot Candrabhaga Stadium, Bekasi
Attendance: 141
Referee: Hussein Abo Yehia (Lebanon)
25 October 2018
19:00

Australia	1–1	Jordan
Puflett 10'	Report	Hani 76'

Pakansari Stadium, Cibinong
Attendance: 42
Referee: Sivakorn Pu-udom (Thailand)

=== Group D ===
Pos	Team	Pld	W	D	L	GF	GA	GD	Pts	Qualification
1	Saudi Arabia	3	3	0	0	6	2	+4	9	Knockout stage
2	Tajikistan	3	1	1	1	4	5	−1	4	Knockout stage
3	China	3	1	0	2	2	2	0	3	
4	Malaysia	3	0	1	2	3	6	−3	1	

Source: AFC
Rules for classification: Group stage tiebreakers
20 October 2018
16:00

Saudi Arabia	2–1	Malaysia
Al-Ammar 24'; Al-Salem 78'	Report	Hadi 88'

Patriot Candrabhaga Stadium, Bekasi
Attendance: 181
Referee: Kim Hee-gon (South Korea)
20 October 2018
19:00

Tajikistan	1–0	China
Solehov 77'	Report

Patriot Candrabhaga Stadium, Bekasi
Attendance: 153
Referee: Hanna Hattab (Syria)

23 October 2018
16:00

China	0–1	Saudi Arabia
	Report	Al-Qahtani 81'

Patriot Candrabhaga Stadium, Bekasi
Attendance: 164
Referee: Yudai Yamamoto (Japan)
23 October 2018
19:00

Malaysia	2–2	Tajikistan
Hadi 11'; Hanonov 55' (o.g.)	Report	Panjshanbe 34' (pen.); Yodgorov 45+1'

Patriot Candrabhaga Stadium, Bekasi
Attendance: 109
Referee: Ahmed Al-Ali (Jordan)

26 October 2018
19:00

Saudi Arabia	3–1	Tajikistan
Al-Zaqarta 65', 70'; Al-Ghashayan 73'	Report	Boboev 29'

Patriot Candrabhaga Stadium, Bekasi
Attendance: 170
Referee: Omar Al-Yaqoubi (Oman)
26 October 2018
19:00

China	2–0	Malaysia
Tao Qianglong 44'; Xu Yue 58'	Report

Pakansari Stadium, Cibinong
Attendance: 102
Referee: Khamis Al-Kuwari (Qatar)

== Knockout stage ==
In the knockout stage, extra time and penalty shoot-out are used to decide the winner if necessary.

=== Bracket ===
Quarter-finals
28 October – Jakarta
Qatar (a.e.t.)	7
Thailand	3
29 October – Bekasi
South Korea	1
Tajikistan	0
28 October – Jakarta
Japan	2
Indonesia	0
29 October – Bekasi
Saudi Arabia	3
Australia	1

Semi-finals
1 November – Cibinong
Qatar	1
South Korea	3
1 November – Cibinong
Japan	0
Saudi Arabia	2

Final
4 November – Cibinong
South Korea	1
Saudi Arabia	2

=== Quarter-finals ===
Winners qualified for the 2019 FIFA U-20 World Cup.

28 October 2018
16:00

Qatar	7–3 (a.e.t.)	Thailand
Ali 13'; Al Yazidi 21'; Suhail 87'; Umaru 99', 117'; Mansour 106'; Ayman 120'	Report	Korawich 48'; Sakunchai 61'; Thirapak 80'

Gelora Bung Karno Stadium, Jakarta
Attendance: 16,758
Referee: Omar Al-Yaqoubi (Oman)

28 October 2018
19:30

Japan	2–0	Indonesia
Higashi 40'; Miyashiro 70'	Report

Gelora Bung Karno Stadium, Jakarta
Attendance: 60,154
Referee: Mooud Bonyadifard (Iran)

29 October 2018
16:00

South Korea	1–0	Tajikistan
Jeon Se-jin 44'	Report

Patriot Candrabhaga Stadium, Bekasi
Attendance: 58
Referee: Ahmed Al-Ali (Jordan)

29 October 2018
19:30

Saudi Arabia	3–1	Australia
Al-Ammar 7'; Al-Buraikan 50'; Abdulhamid 82'	Report	Atkinson 42'

Patriot Candrabhaga Stadium, Bekasi
Attendance: 110
Referee: Sherzod Kasimov (Uzbekistan)

=== Semi-finals ===
1 November 2018
16:00

Qatar	1–3	South Korea
Lee Jae-ik 52' (o.g.)	Report	Jeon Se-jin 23', 33'; Um Won-sang 45+2'

Pakansari Stadium, Cibinong
Attendance: 145
Referee: Mooud Bonyadifard (Iran)

1 November 2018
19:30

Japan	0–2	Saudi Arabia
	Report	Al-Ammar 29'; Al-Ghannam 45+1'

Pakansari Stadium, Cibinong
Attendance: 311
Referee: Ahmed Al-Ali (Jordan)

=== Final ===
4 November 2018
19:30

South Korea	1–2	Saudi Arabia
Cho Young-wook 64' (pen.)	Report	Al-Ammar 2'; Al-Ghannam 22'

Pakansari Stadium, Cibinong
Attendance: 3,089
Referee: Sivakorn Pu-udom (Thailand)

== Winners ==
2018 AFC U-19 Championship

Saudi Arabia
Third title

== Awards ==
The following awards were given at the conclusion of the tournament:

Top Goalscorer	Most Valuable Player	Fair Play award
(Qatar) Abdulrasheed Umaru	(Saudi Arabia) Turki Al-Ammar	Saudi Arabia

== Goalscorers ==
There were 117 goals scored in 31 matches, for an average of 3.77 goals per match.

7 goals

- (Qatar) Abdulrasheed Umaru

5 goals

- (Qatar) Hashim Ali
- (South Korea) Jeon Se-jin

4 goals

- (Japan) Taisei Miyashiro
- (Saudi Arabia) Turki Al-Ammar
- (South Korea) Cho Young-wook

3 goals

- (Indonesia) Todd Rivaldo Ferre
- (Indonesia) Witan Sulaeman
- (Japan) Koki Saito
- (Thailand) Korawich Tasa
- (United Arab Emirates) Ali Saleh

2 goals

- (Japan) Taichi Hara
- (Jordan) Omar Hani
- (Malaysia) Hadi Fayyadh
- (North Korea) Kang Kuk-chol
- (Qatar) Khaled Mansour
- (Saudi Arabia) Khalid Al-Ghannam
- (Saudi Arabia) Safi Al-Zaqarta
- (Thailand) Suphanat Mueanta
- (United Arab Emirates) Ahmad Fawzi
- (United Arab Emirates) Rashed Mubarak
- (United Arab Emirates) Majed Rashed

1 goal

- (Australia) Nathaniel Atkinson
- (Australia) Ben Folami
- (Australia) Ramy Najjarine
- (Australia) Oliver Puflett
- (Australia) Angus Thurgate
- (China) Tao Qianglong
- (China) Xu Yue
- (Chinese Taipei) Wang Chung-yu
- (Chinese Taipei) Wu Yen-shu
- (Indonesia) Egy Maulana Vikri
- (Indonesia) Luthfi Kamal
- (Indonesia) Saddil Ramdani
- (Iraq) Hasan Abdulkareem
- (Iraq) Moamel Abdulridha
- (Iraq) Wakaa Ramadhan
- (Japan) Hiroki Abe
- (Japan) Shunki Higashi
- (Japan) Hiroki Ito
- (Japan) Takefusa Kubo
- (Japan) Kyosuke Tagawa
- (Japan) Yuta Taki
- (Jordan) Mohammad Bani Atieh
- (Jordan) Mohammad Al-Zu'bi
- (North Korea) Pak Kwang-chon
- (North Korea) Kye Tam
- (Qatar) Yousef Ayman
- (Qatar) Ahmed Suhail
- (Qatar) Mohammed Waad
- (Qatar) Nasser Al Yazidi
- (Saudi Arabia) Saud Abdulhamid
- (Saudi Arabia) Firas Al-Buraikan
- (Saudi Arabia) Faraj Al-Ghashayan
- (Saudi Arabia) Abdulmohsen Al-Qahtani
- (Saudi Arabia) Salem Al-Salem
- (South Korea) Choi Jun
- (South Korea) Kim Hyun-woo
- (South Korea) Um Won-sang
- (Tajikistan) Sheriddin Boboev
- (Tajikistan) Ehson Panjshanbe
- (Tajikistan) Sharafdzhon Solehov
- (Tajikistan) Daler Yodgorov
- (Thailand) Kritsada Kaman
- (Thailand) Sampan Kesi
- (Thailand) Thirapak Prueangna
- (Thailand) Sakunchai Saengthopho
- (United Arab Emirates) Abdullah Al-Naqbi
- (Vietnam) Lê Văn Nam
- (Vietnam) Lê Xuân Tú
- (Vietnam) Nhâm Mạnh Dũng

1 own goal

- (South Korea) Lee Jae-ik (against Qatar)
- (Tajikistan) Vahdat Hanonov (against Malaysia)

== Qualified teams for FIFA U-20 World Cup ==
The following four teams from AFC qualified for the 2019 FIFA U-20 World Cup.

Team	Qualified on	Previous appearances in FIFA U-20 World Cup^{1}
Qatar	28 October 2018	3 (1981, 1995, 2015)
Japan	28 October 2018	9 (1979, 1995, 1997, 1999, 2001, 2003, 2005, 2007, 2017)
South Korea	29 October 2018	14 (1979, 1981, 1983, 1991, 1993, 1997, 1999, 2003, 2005, 2007, 2009, 2011, 2013, 2017)
Saudi Arabia	29 October 2018	8 (1985, 1987, 1989, 1993, 1999, 2003, 2011, 2017)

^{1} Bold indicates champions for that year. Italic indicates hosts for that year.

== Concerns and controversies ==
An error was made before the start of Jordan–South Korea Group C match on 22 October 2018, where the operator played North Korean national anthem instead of South Korean national anthem. The wrong anthem was stopped immediately and the operator has since been replaced.
