= Billy Keraf =

Indonesian association footballer

Personal information
- Full name: Fulgensius Billy Paji Keraf
- Date of birth: 8 May 1997 (age 29)
- Place of birth: Maumere, Indonesia
- Height: 1.58 m (5 ft 2 in)
- Position: Winger

Youth career
- ASIOP

Senior career*
Years	Team	Apps	(Gls)
2017–2019	Persib Bandung	25	(5)
2018	→ Borneo (loan)	9	(1)
2019	Badak Lampung	9	(0)
2020	Kalteng Putra	1	(1)
2021	Persita Tangerang	5	(0)
2022	PSDS Deli Serdang	3	(0)

International career
2014	Indonesia U19		
2019	Indonesia U23	2	(0)
Medal record
Men's football
Representing Indonesia
AFF U-22 Youth Championship
Winner	2019 Cambodia	Team
- * Club domestic league appearances and goals as of 18 September 2022

Fulgensius Billy Paji Keraf (born 8 May 1997) is an Indonesian professional footballer who plays as a winger.

== Club career ==
=== Persib Bandung ===
Keraf made his professional debut in Liga 1 on 22 April 2017, against PS TNI. He appeared during the first half as a substitute for Angga Febryanto in the 35th minute. Keraf provided one assist to Atep Rizal in the 53rd minute.

On 3 May 2017, he scored his first goal against Gresik United in stoppage time, securing a 1–0 win for Persib Bandung.

==== Borneo (loan) ====
Keraf was signed by Borneo to play in the Liga 1 in the 2018 season, on loan from Persib Bandung. Keraf made his debut on 20 July 2018 in a match against PS TIRA. On 10 November 2018, Keraf scored his first goal for Borneo against PSIS Semarang in the 14th minute at the Segiri Stadium in Samarinda.

=== Badak Lampung ===
He was signed by Badak Lampung to play in the Liga 1 in the 2019 season. Keraf made his debut on 21 June 2019 in a match against Semen Padang at the Haji Agus Salim Stadium in Padang.

=== Kalteng Putra ===
In 2020, Billy Keraf signed a one-year contract with Indonesian Liga 2 club Kalteng Putra. The season was suspended on 27 March 2020 due to the COVID-19 pandemic. The season was abandoned and was declared void on 20 January 2021.

=== Persita Tangerang ===
Keraf was signed by Persita Tangerang to play in the Liga 1 in the 2021 season. He made his league debut on 28 August 2021 in a match against Persipura Jayapura at the Pakansari Stadium in Cibinong.

== Honours ==
=== International ===
Indonesia U-23

- AFF U-22 Youth Championship: 2019
