= Nguyễn Hùng Thiện Đức =

Vietnamese footballer

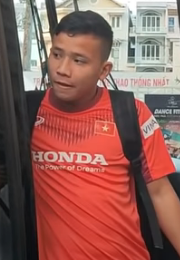
- Thiện Đức in 2019

Personal information
- Full name: Nguyễn Hùng Thiện Đức
- Date of birth: 8 December 1999 (age 26)
- Place of birth: Dĩ An, Bình Dương, Vietnam
- Height: 1.69 m (5 ft 7 in)
- Position: Left-back

Team information
- Current team: Becamex Hồ Chí Minh City
- Number: 28

Youth career
- 2017–2018: Becamex Bình Dương

Senior career*
Years	Team	Apps	(Gls)
2018–2025	Becamex Bình Dương	34	(0)
2024	→ Quy Nhơn Bình Định (loan)	6	(0)
2025–2026	Hồ Chí Minh City	12	(0)
2026–	Becamex Hồ Chí Minh City	0	(0)

International career
2018	Vietnam U19	2	(0)
2019–2020	Vietnam U23	3	(0)
- * Club domestic league appearances and goals as of 17 May 2026

Nguyễn Hùng Thiện Đức (born 8 December 1999) is a Vietnamese professional footballer who plays as a left-back for V.League 2 club Becamex Hồ Chí Minh City.

== Club career ==
Born in Bình Dương, Thiện Đức was a youth product of local team Becamex Bình Dương. He was promoted to the first team in 2018 and made his debut in the 2018 V.League 1.

On May 5, 2019, in the match V.League 1 against Hanoi, after a ball fight and a very strong collision with Pape Omar Faye, Thiện Đức collapsed on the field and lost consciousness. He was then hospitalized and managed to recover quickly because the injury was not life-threatening.

In March 2024, Thiện Đức joined V.League 1 side Quy Nhơn Bình Định on a six-month loan deal.

== International career ==
He was part of the Vietnam U19 squad that feature in the 2018 AFC U-19 Championship.

In February 2019, Thiện Đức participated in the 2019 AFF U-22 Youth Championship with Vietnam U22 and appeared in 3 games during the tournament as his finished at third place.
