= Dimas Drajad =

Indonesian footballer

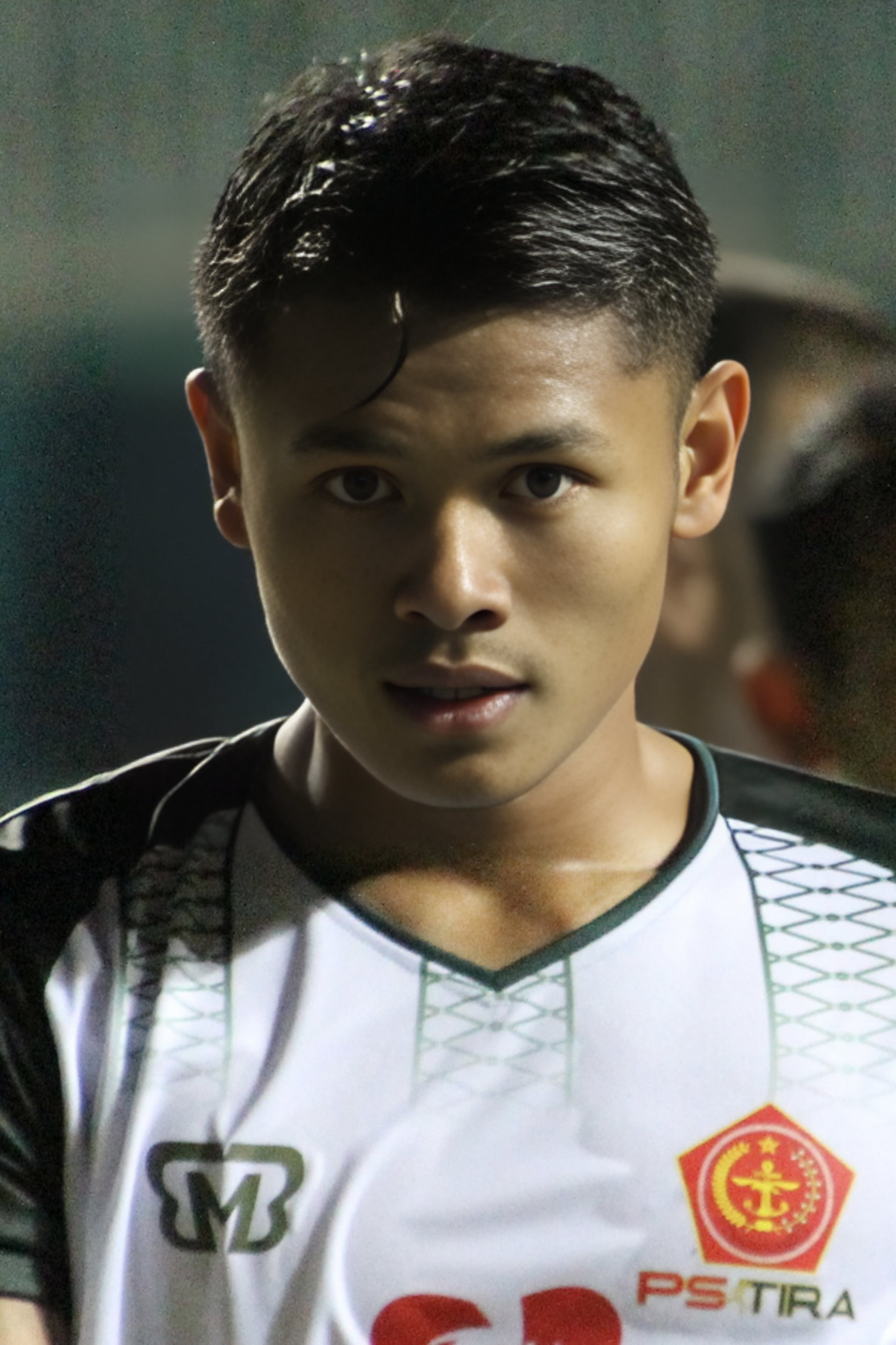
- Drajad playing for PS TIRA in 2018

Personal information
- Full name: Muhammad Dimas Drajad
- Date of birth: 30 March 1997 (age 29)
- Place of birth: Gresik, Indonesia
- Height: 1.77 m (5 ft 10 in)
- Position: Forward

Team information
- Current team: PSS Sleman
- Number: 97

Youth career
- 2012–2013: Deportivo Indonesia
- 2013–2014: Gresik United
- 2016: PS TNI

Senior career*
Years	Team	Apps	(Gls)
2015	Persegres Gresik United	0	(0)
2016–2024	Persikabo 1973	98	(28)
2017	→ PSMS Medan (loan)	17	(6)
2024–2026	Persib Bandung	15	(2)
2025–2026	→ Malut United (loan)	12	(0)
2026–	PSS Sleman	1	(0)

International career^{‡}
2013–2016	Indonesia U19	20	(12)
2019	Indonesia U23	5	(1)
2022–2024	Indonesia	15	(6)
Medal record
Men's football
Representing Indonesia
AFF U-19 Youth Championship
Winner	2013 Indonesia
AFF U-22 Youth Championship
Winner	2019 Cambodia	Team
- * Club domestic league appearances and goals as of 4 September 2026 ‡ National team caps and goals as of 11 June 2024

Muhammad Dimas Drajad (born 30 March 1997) is an Indonesian professional footballer who plays as a forward for Super League club PSS Sleman, and the Indonesia national team. He is also a Second Sergeant in the Indonesian Army. His younger brother Ahmad Wahyudi is also a footballer.

== International career ==
Dimas began his first career in the national team when trained by Indra Sjafri, then, Indonesia has become a champion in 2013 AFF U-19 Youth Championship. In 2014, Dimas represented the Indonesia U-19, in the 2014 AFC U-19 Championship.

On 1 June 2022, Dimas earned his first senior cap in a friendly match against Bangladesh that ended 0–0. On 14 March 2022, Dimas scored his first international goal for Indonesia, in a 7–0 win against Nepal in the third round of Asian Cup qualifiers.

On 24 September 2022, Dimas scored a goal in a friendly match against Curaçao in a 3–2 win. A few days later on 27 September 2022, Dimas scored the opening goal for the friendly match against Curaçao which resulted in a 2–1 win.

In November 2022, it was reported that Dimas received a call-up from the Indonesia for a training camp, in preparation for the 2022 AFF Championship.

On 12 October 2023, Dimas scored a hat-trick against Brunei in the 2026 FIFA World Cup qualifiers.

== Career statistics ==
=== Club ===
As of match played 4 September 2026

Club	Season	League			Cup		Other		Total	
Club	Season	Division	Apps	Goals	Apps	Goals	Apps	Goals	Apps	Goals
Gresik United	2015	ISL	0	0	0	0	0	0	0	0
Persikabo 1973	2016	ISC A	2	0	0	0	0	0	2	0
Persikabo 1973	2018	Liga 1	20	4	0	0	0	0	20	4
Persikabo 1973	2019	Liga 1	0	0	0	0	0	0	0	0
Persikabo 1973	2020	Liga 1	0	0	0	0	0	0	0	0
Persikabo 1973	2021–22	Liga 1	31	11	0	0	3 (Note: Appearances in Menpora Cup)	0	34	11
Persikabo 1973	2022–23	Liga 1	20	7	0	0	0	0	20	7
Persikabo 1973	2023–24	Liga 1	25	6	0	0	0	0	25	6
Persikabo 1973	Total		98	28	0	0	3	0	101	28
PSMS Medan (loan)	2017	Liga 2	17	6	0	0	0	0	17	6
Persib Bandung	2024–25	Liga 1	14	2	0	0	3 (Note: Appearances in AFC Champions League Two)	0	17	2
Persib Bandung	2025–26	Super League	1	0	0	0	0	0	1	0
Persib Bandung	Total		15	2	0	0	3	0	18	2
Malut United (loan)	2025–26	Super League	12	0	0	0	0	0	12	0
PSS Sleman	2026–27	Super League	1	0	0	0	0	0	1	0
Career total			143	36	0	0	6	0	149	36

=== International ===
As of match played 11 June 2024

Appearances and goals by national team and year
National team	Year	Apps	Goals
Indonesia	2022	6	3
Indonesia	2023	5	3
Indonesia	2024	4	0
Total		15	6

As of match played 11 June 2024
Scores and results list Indonesia's goal tally first, score column indicates score after each Drajad goal.

List of international goals scored by Dimas Drajad
No.	Date	Venue	Cap	Opponent	Score	Result	Competition
1	14 June 2022	Jaber Al-Ahmad International Stadium, Kuwait City, Kuwait	4	Nepal	1–0	7–0	2023 AFC Asian Cup qualification
2	24 September 2022	Gelora Bandung Lautan Api Stadium, Bandung, Indonesia	5	Curaçao	3–2	3–2	Friendly
3	27 September 2022	Pakansari Stadium, Bogor, Indonesia	6	Curaçao	1–0	2–1	Friendly
4	12 October 2023	Gelora Bung Karno Stadium, Jakarta, Indonesia	10	Brunei	1–0	6–0	2026 FIFA World Cup qualification
5	12 October 2023	Gelora Bung Karno Stadium, Jakarta, Indonesia	10	Brunei	5–0	6–0	2026 FIFA World Cup qualification
6	12 October 2023	Gelora Bung Karno Stadium, Jakarta, Indonesia	10	Brunei	6–0	6–0	2026 FIFA World Cup qualification

== Honours ==
PS TNI U21

- Indonesia Soccer Championship U-21: 2016

PSMS Medan

- Liga 2 runner-up: 2017

Persib Bandung

- Liga 1: 2024–25

Indonesia U19

- AFF U-19 Youth Championship: 2013

Indonesia U22

- AFF U-22 Youth Championship: 2019

Individual

- Indonesia Soccer Championship U-21 Best Player: 2016
- Liga 1 Goal of the Month: September 2022
