= Satria Tama =

Indonesian footballer

Personal information
- Full name: Satria Tama Hardiyanto
- Date of birth: 23 January 1997 (age 29)
- Place of birth: Sidoarjo, Indonesia
- Height: 1.83 m (6 ft 0 in)
- Position: Goalkeeper

Team information
- Current team: Barito Putera
- Number: 86

Youth career
- 2012–2015: Gresik United

Senior career*
| Years | Team | Apps | (Gls) |
| 2016–2017 | Gresik United | 14 | (0) |
| 2017–2021 | Madura United | 30 | (0) |
| 2021–2023 | Persebaya Surabaya | 9 | (0) |
| 2023–2024 | Madura United | 8 | (0) |
| 2024– | Barito Putera | 33 | (0) |

International career
| 2014–2016 | Indonesia U19 | 3 | (0) |
| 2017–2019 | Indonesia U23 | 9 | (0) |
| 2017 | Indonesia | 1 | (0) |
Medal record
Men's football
Representing Indonesia
Southeast Asian Games
| Bronze medal – third place | 2017 Malaysia | Team |
AFF U-22 Youth Championship
| Winner | 2019 Cambodia | Team |
- * Club domestic league appearances and goals as of 24 January 2026

Satria Tama Hardiyanto (born in Sidoarjo, 23 January 1997) is an Indonesian professional footballer who plays as a goalkeeper for Liga 2 club Barito Putera.

== International career ==
In 2016, Satria Tama represented the Indonesia U-19, in the 2016 AFF U-19 Youth Championship. He made his international debut for senior team on 13 June 2017, against Puerto Rico replacing Kurnia Meiga at a half time.

== Career statistics ==
=== Club ===
As of match played 24 January 2026

| Club | Season | League | | | Cup | | Other | | Total | |
| Club | Season | Division | Apps | Goals | Apps | Goals | Apps | Goals | Apps | Goals |
|---|---|---|---|---|---|---|---|---|---|---|
| Persegres Gresik | 2016 | ISC A | 5 | 0 | 0 | 0 | 0 | 0 | 5 | 0 |
| Persegres Gresik | 2017 | Liga 1 | 9 | 0 | 0 | 0 | 0 | 0 | 9 | 0 |
| Persegres Gresik | Total | | 14 | 0 | 0 | 0 | 0 | 0 | 14 | 0 |
| Madura United | 2018 | Liga 1 | 24 | 0 | 0 | 0 | 0 | 0 | 24 | 0 |
| Madura United | 2019 | Liga 1 | 6 | 0 | 0 | 0 | 0 | 0 | 6 | 0 |
| Madura United | 2020 | Liga 1 | 0 | 0 | 0 | 0 | 0 | 0 | 0 | 0 |
| Madura United | Total | | 30 | 0 | 0 | 0 | 0 | 0 | 30 | 0 |
| Persebaya Surabaya | 2021–22 | Liga 1 | 0 | 0 | 0 | 0 | 4 (Note: Appearances in Menpora Cup) | 0 | 4 | 0 |
| Persebaya Surabaya | 2022–23 | Liga 1 | 9 | 0 | 0 | 0 | 1 (Note: Appearances in Indonesia President's Cup) | 0 | 10 | 0 |
| Persebaya Surabaya | Total | | 9 | 0 | 0 | 0 | 5 | 0 | 14 | 0 |
| Madura United | 2023–24 | Liga 1 | 8 | 0 | 0 | 0 | 0 | 0 | 8 | 0 |
| Barito Putera | 2024–25 | Liga 1 | 23 | 0 | 0 | 0 | 0 | 0 | 23 | 0 |
| Barito Putera | 2025–26 | Liga 2 | 10 | 0 | 0 | 0 | 0 | 0 | 10 | 0 |
| Career total | | | 94 | 0 | 0 | 0 | 5 | 0 | 99 | 0 |

=== International ===
As of match played 13 June 2017

Appearances and goals by national team and year
| National team | Year | Apps | Goals |
|---|---|---|---|
| Indonesia | 2017 | 1 | 0 |
| Total | | 1 | 0 |

== Honours ==
=== International ===
Indonesia U-23

- SEA Games bronze medal: 2017
- AFF U-22 Youth Championship: 2019

Indonesia

- Aceh World Solidarity Cup runner-up: 2017
