= Abdulrasheed Umaru =

Qatari footballer (born 1999)

Personal information
- Full name: Abdulrasheed Umaru Ibrahim
- Date of birth: 12 August 1999 (age 27)
- Place of birth: Qatar
- Height: 1.73 m (5 ft 8 in)
- Position: Forward

Team information
- Current team: Qatar
- Number: 19

Youth career
- 2011-2016: Al Ahli
- 2016–2018: Aspire Academy
- 2018–2019: K.A.S. Eupen

Senior career*
Years	Team	Apps	(Gls)
2019–2025	Al Ahli	84	(12)
2025–	Qatar	0	(0)

International career^{‡}
2016–2018	Qatar U19	9	(8)
2019	Qatar U20	3	(0)
2021	Qatar U23	1	(0)
- * Club domestic league appearances and goals as of 4 May 2023 (UTC) ‡ National team caps and goals as of 20:21, 20 May 2023 (UTC)

Abdulrasheed Umaru Ibrahim (Arabic: عبد الرشيد عمرو; born 12 August 1999) is a Qatari professional footballer who plays as a forward for Qatar Stars League side Qatar.

== Career statistics ==
=== Club ===
As of 4 May 2023.

Club	Season	League		Cup		Continental		Other		Total	
Club	Season	Apps	Goals	Apps	Goals	Apps	Goals	Apps	Goals	Apps	Goals
Al Ahli	2018–19	3	1	0	0	0	0	0	0	3	1
Al Ahli	2019–20	16	1	0	0	0	0	0	0	16	1
Al Ahli	2020–21	21	3	3	0	0	0	0	0	24	3
Al Ahli	2021–22	16	4	0	0	0	0	0	0	16	4
Al Ahli	2022–23	17	1	0	0	0	0	0	0	17	1
Career total		73	10	3	0	0	0	0	0	76	10

== Honours ==
Individual

- AFC U-19 Championship Top Goalscorer: 2018 (7 goals)
