= 2014 Soeratin Cup U-17 =

Soeratin Cup
- Season: 2014
- Champions: Jember United

2014 Soeratin Cup is a football competition which is intended for footballers born before 1 January 1997. The competition is scheduled to begin in August 2014 and ends in December 2014.

PSDS Deli Serdang is the defending champion. Charis Yulianto was chosen to be the ambassador for this tournament.

Jember United U-17 won the championship after beating Persis Solo U-17 3–1 in the final. Gian Zola became top scorer with nine goals and Faisol Yunus got the Best Player award.

== Competition format ==
It will consists of three rounds, which are the province, regional and national round. The national round will have a group phase and after that semi-finals and final.

== Province round ==
=== North Sumatra Zone ===
PS Bintang Jaya U-17 became champion and qualifies for the regional round.

Team 1	Score	Team 2
PS Bintang Jaya U-17	5–0	Poslab Labuhan Batu U-17

=== West Sumatra Zone ===
The final was played in Haji Agus Salim Stadium on 9 September 2014. PSP Padang U-17 became the champion and qualify to the regional round.

Team 1	Score	Team 2
PSP Padang U-17	5–0	Cahaya Baru Taruna Mandiri U-17

=== Bengkulu Zone ===
Twelve teams will participate and matches will start on 7 October 2014. Matches will be played in Stadion Semarak. Bengkulu Tengah U-17 became champion.

=== Jambi Zone ===
Eleven teams will participate and matches will start on 27 September 2014. Matches will be played in Stadion Karya Bhakti. Batang Hari FC became champion.

=== Riau Zone ===
Rumbai FC U-17 became the champion.

=== Bangka–Belitung Islands Zone ===
Persibel Belitung U-17 became the champion.

=== South Sumatra Zone ===
The final was played in Stadion Serasan Sekate on 30 August 2014. Persimuba U-17 became the champion and qualify to the regional round.

Team 1	Score	Team 2
Persimuba U-17	4–2	PS Pali U-17

=== Lampung Zone ===
The matches will be played in Stadion Tejosari in Metro from 20 September until 30 September 2014. Persilat Lampung Tengah U-17 became the champion.

=== Banten Zone ===
Four team will participate in this zone. Persikota U-17 became champion of this zone.

=== DKI Jakarta Zone ===
Urakan FC U-17 became champion of this zone.

=== West Java Zone ===
This zone consists of 25 clubs divided into 5 groups. The top three from each group will go through to the second round and also the top ranked fourth-placed team. Matches will start on 1 September 2014.

==== First round ====
===== Group A =====
PSB Bogor U-17, Persikasi Bekasi U-17 and Maisa FC U-17 qualified from this group. Sukabumi FC U-17 qualifies as best fourth-placed team.

===== Group B =====
Persikabo Bogor U-17, Kabomania U-17 and Blaster FC U-17 qualified from this group.

===== Group C =====
Persika Karawang U-17, Persipo Purwakarta U-17 and Benpica U-17 qualified from this group.

===== Group D =====
Bina Putra Sentra Cirebon U-17, Pesik Kuningan U-17 and Persikas Subang U-17 qualified from this group.

===== Group E =====
Bandung Legend U-17, Persib Bandung U-17 and Persima Majalengka U-17 qualified from this group.

==== Second round ====
Matches starting this round until the semi-finals will be played in Stadion Galuh, Ciamis.

20 September 2014
PSB Bogor U-17	0–0 (1–4 pen.)	Benpica U-17
Persikabo Bogor U-17	2–0	Pesik Kuningan U-17
21 September 2014
Persika Karawang U-17	1–0	Persikas Subang U-17
Persib Bandung U-17	3–2	Maisa FC U-17
22 September 2014
Kabomania U-17	4–3	Persima Majalengka U-17
Sukabumi FC U-17	2–2 (6–7 pen.)	Persipo Purwakarta U-17
23 September 2014
Bina Putra Sentra Cirebon U-17	8–0	Blaster FC U-17
Bandung Legend U-17	7–0	Persikasi Bekasi U-17

==== Quarter-finals ====
24 September 2014
Persika Karawang U-17	1–2	Persib Bandung U-17
Persikabo Bogor U-17	4–2	Benpica U-17
25 September 2014
Bandung Legend U-17	1–0	Bina Putra Sentra Cirebon U-17
Kabomania U-17	3–1	Persipo Purwakarta U-17

==== Semi-finals ====
26 September 2014
Persikabo Bogor U-17	0–7	Persib Bandung U-17
27 September 2014
Kabomania U-17	2–1	Bandung Legend U-17

==== Third-placed ====
8 October 2014
Persikabo Bogor U-17	1–9	Bandung Legend U-17

==== Final ====
Final and third-placed matches will be played in Singaperbangsa Stadium, Karawang. Persib Bandung U-17 became champion.

8 October 2014
Persib Bandung U-17	2–1	Kabomania U-17

=== Central Java Zone ===
Persis Solo U-17 was the champion of the zone and qualified for the national round.

Team 1	Score	Team 2
Persis Solo U-17	4–1	Persiku Kudus U-17

=== Yogyakarta Zone ===
PSS Sleman U-17 became the champion.

=== East Java Zone ===
Matches for group A will be played at Stadion Diponegoro and Stadion Maron in Banyuwangi. Matches for group D will be played at Stadion Gelora Supriyadi in Blitar.

The second round will consists of 12 teams, in which group winners and the best runner-up from all groups will qualify for the knockout stage.

==== First round ====
===== Group A =====
Jember United U-17 and PSIL Lumajang U-17 qualified from this group.

===== Group B =====
Persekap Pasuruan U-17 and Persebaya Surabaya U-17 qualified from this group.

===== Group C =====
Persema 1953 Malang U-17 and Persid Jember U-17 qualified from this group.

===== Group D =====
Triple S Kediri U-17 and PSBK Blitar U-17 qualified from this group.

===== Group E =====
Persik Kediri U-17 and Akademi Arema Ngunut Tulungagung U-17 qualified from this group.

===== Group F =====
Persekam Metro FC U-17 and Persela Lamongan U-17 qualified from this group.

==== Second round ====
This round will be played from 29 September until 3 October 2014.

===== Group G =====
Team	Pld	W	D	L	GF	GA	GD	Pts
Jember United U-17 (A)	3	2	0	1	5	1	+4	6
Persekap Pasuruan U-17	3	1	2	0	3	2	+1	5
Persebaya Surabaya U-17	3	1	1	1	2	3	−1	4
Triple S Kediri U-17	3	0	1	2	1	4	−3	1

(A) Advance to a further round

===== Group H =====
Team	Pld	W	D	L	GF	GA	GD	Pts
PSBK Blitar U-17 (A)	3	3	0	0	12	1	+11	9
Akademi Arema Ngunut Tulungagung U-17	3	2	0	1	9	7	+2	6
Persekam Metro FC U-17	3	1	0	2	3	9	−6	3
Persid Jember U-17	3	0	0	3	2	11	−9	0

(A) Advance to a further round

===== Group I =====
Team	Pld	W	D	L	GF	GA	GD	Pts
Persik Kediri U-17 (A)	3	2	1	0	2	0	+2	7
Persela Lamongan U-17	3	2	0	1	4	3	+1	6
Persema 1953 Malang U-17	3	1	1	1	0	1	−1	4
PSIL Lumajang U-17	3	0	0	3	2	4	−2	0

(A) Advance to a further round

===== Ranking of second-placed teams =====
Team	Pld	W	D	L	GF	GA	GD	Pts
Akademi Arema Ngunut Tulungagung U-17 (A)	3	2	0	1	9	7	+2	6
Persela Lamongan U-17	3	2	0	1	4	3	+1	6
Persekap Pasuruan U-17	3	1	2	0	3	2	+1	5

(A) Advance to a further round

==== Semi-finals ====
Team 1	Agg.	Team 2	1st leg	2nd leg
Persik Kediri U-17	2–3	Akademi Arema Ngunut Tulungagung U-17	2–1	0–2
PSBK Blitar U-17	1–2	Jember United U-17	1–0	0–2

==== Final ====
The final will be played in Madiun on October 14, 2014. Jember United U-17 became champion.

Team 1	Score	Team 2
Jember United U-17	2–2 (3–2 pen.)	Akademi Arema Ngunut Tulungagung U-17

=== East Kalimantan Zone ===
Group A will be played in Tenggarong and the other group in Sangatta. Winners and runners-up from both groups will qualify to the knockout stage.

==== Group stage ====
===== Group A =====
Team	Pld	W	D	L	GF	GA	GD	Pts
Kukar U-17 (A)	4	4	0	0	13	2	+11	12
Paser U-17 (A)	4	3	0	1	11	5	+6	9
Penajam Paser Utara U-17	4	1	1	2	5	3	+2	4
Balikpapan U-17	4	1	1	2	8	7	+1	4
Kutai Barat Paser U-17	4	0	0	4	0	20	−20	0

(A) Advance to a further round

===== Group B =====
Both Kutim U-17 (group winner) and Bontang U-17 (group runner-up) qualified to the semifinals.

==== Final ====
Bontang U-17 qualifies to the regional round after beating Paser U-17 in the semi-final and Kutim U-17 in the final.

Team 1	Score	Team 2
Bontang U-17	2–1	Kutim U-17

=== South Kalimantan Zone ===
Persepan Pagatan U-17 became champion.

=== South Sulawesi Zone ===
Matches will start on 25 September 2014. Semi-finals and final will be played on 6–7 October 2014. Makassar U-17 became champion.

==== Semi-finals ====
Team 1	Score	Team 2
Maros U-17	3–3 (4–2 p)	Bantaeng U-17
Makassar U-17	0–0 (3–1 p)	Wajo U-17

==== Final ====
Team 1	Score	Team 2
Maros U-17	0–2	Makassar U-17

=== Bali Zone ===
Five teams participated in this zone. PS Badung U-17 became the champion and qualifies from this zone.

=== East Nusa Tenggara Zone ===
PS Kota Kupang U-17 won the zone and qualifies for the next round.

=== North Maluku Zone ===
Seven teams will participate in this zone and all the matches will be played in Gelora Kieraha Stadium. Persiter U-17 qualified from this zone.

==== Final ====
Team 1	Score	Team 2
Persiter U-17	1–0	Persihalbar U-17

=== Maluku Zone ===
Nusa Ina U-17 was the champion of this zone. They finished first in the group that consists of two other teams with eight points but having more goal difference than Persenal U-17.

== Regional round ==
=== Regional I ===
Team	Pld	W	D	L	GF	GA	GD	Pts
PSSB U-17 (A)	3	2	1	0	5	1	+4	7
PS Bintang Jaya U-17 (A)	3	2	0	1	4	1	+3	6
Batang Hari FC U-17	3	1	1	1	4	4	0	4
Rumbai FC U-17	3	0	0	3	2	8	−6	0

(A) Advance to a further round

=== Regional II ===
Team	Pld	W	D	L	GF	GA	GD	Pts
PSP Padang U-17 (A)	3	3	0	0	13	3	+10	9
Persimuba U-17 (A)	3	2	0	1	6	3	+3	6
Bengkulu Tengah U-17	3	1	0	2	5	12	−7	3
Persibel Belitung U-17	3	0	0	3	4	10	−6	0

(A) Advance to a further round

=== Regional III ===
Team	Pld	W	D	L	GF	GA	GD	Pts
Persib Bandung U-17 (A)	3	3	0	0	14	1	+13	9
Persikota U-17 (A)	3	1	1	1	5	4	+1	4
Urakan FC U-17	3	1	1	1	4	7	−3	4
Persilat Lampung Tengah U-17	3	0	0	3	0	14	−14	0

(A) Advance to a further round

=== Regional IV ===
Team	Pld	W	D	L	GF	GA	GD	Pts
Persis Solo U-17 (A)	2	1	1	0	5	1	+4	4
Jember United U-17 (A)	2	1	1	0	6	3	+3	4
Persista Sintang U-17	2	0	0	2	2	9	−7	0

(A) Advance to a further round

=== Regional V ===
PS Kota Kupang U-17 and PS Badung U-17 qualified to the next round as winner and runner-up respectively.

=== Regional VI ===
PSM Makassar U-17 and Persigo Gorontalo U-17 qualified to the next round as winner and runner-up respectively.

=== Regional VII ===
Bontang FC U-17 and Persepan Pagatan U-17 qualified from this region.

=== Regional VIII ===
Persiter U-17 and Nusa Ina U-17 both qualified from the region as winner and runner-up respectively.

== National round ==
16 teams from the regional round will compete in two stages before the semi-finals and final using home tournament format. Matches for the first stage will be played from 14–19 November 2014, the second stage and knockout stage will be played from 22 November 2014.

=== First stage ===
==== Group 1 ====
Team	Pld	W	D	L	GF	GA	GD	Pts
PS Bintang Jaya U-17 (A)	3	1	2	0	9	5	+4	5
Persis Solo U-17 (A)	3	1	2	0	7	4	+3	5
Persikota U-17	3	1	2	0	8	7	+1	5
PSP Padang U-17	3	0	0	3	4	12	−8	0

(A) Advance to a further round

==== Group 2 ====
Team	Pld	W	D	L	GF	GA	GD	Pts
Persib Bandung U-17 (A)	3	2	1	0	14	2	+12	7
Jember United U-17 (A)	3	2	1	0	6	2	+4	7
Persimuba U-17	3	1	0	2	2	5	−3	3
PSSB U-17	3	0	0	3	3	14	−11	0

(A) Advance to a further round

==== Group 3 ====
Bontang FC U-17 and Nusa Ina U-17 qualified from this region.

==== Group 4 ====
Persiter U-17 and Persigo Gorontalo U-17 qualified from this region.

=== Knockout stage ===
Quarterfinal matches will be played in Bandung and Malang. Sidoarjo will host semifinal and final matches.

==== Quarter-finals ====
22 November 2014
Persib Bandung U-17	2–2 (3–4 (p))	Persis Solo U-17
PS Bintang Jaya U-17	0–0 (4–5 (p))	Jember United U-17
Bontang FC U-17	1–0	Persiter U-17
Persigo Gorontalo U-17	2–4 (a.e.t.)	Nusa Ina U-17

==== Semi-finals ====
30 November 2014
Persis Solo U-17	1–1 (4–1 (p))	Nusa Ina U-17
Jember United U-17	3–2	Bontang FC U-17

==== Third-placed ====
2 December 2014
Bontang FC U-17	1-3	Nusa Ina U-17

==== Final ====
2 December 2014
Persis Solo U-17	1–3	Jember United U-17
