= Marinus Wanewar =

Indonesian footballer

Personal information
- Full name: Marinus Maryanto Wanewar
- Date of birth: 24 February 1997 (age 29)
- Place of birth: Sarmi, Indonesia
- Height: 1.81 m (5 ft 11 in)
- Position: Forward

Team information
- Current team: Persiku Kudus
- Number: 24

Youth career
- 2015: Reliv Christa
- 2015: → Den Bosch (trial)
- 2016: Persipura Jayapura

Senior career*
Years	Team	Apps	(Gls)
2016–2021	Persipura Jayapura	37	(6)
2018	→ Bhayangkara (loan)	18	(3)
2021	Muba Babel United	0	(0)
2021–2022	Persis Solo	1	(0)
2022–2023	Persela Lamongan	0	(0)
2023–2025	Persipura Jayapura	41	(3)
2026–	Persiku Kudus	0	(0)

International career
2017–2019	Indonesia U23	8	(5)
2017	Indonesia	2	(0)
Medal record
Men's football
Representing Indonesia
Southeast Asian Games
Bronze medal – third place	2017 Kuala Lumpur	Team
AFF U-22 Youth Championship
Winner	2019 Cambodia	Team
- * Club domestic league appearances and goals as of 1 November 2025

Marinus Maryanto Wanewar (born 24 February 1997 in Sarmi) is an Indonesian professional footballer who plays as a forward for Championship club Persiku Kudus.

== Club career ==
=== Persipura Jayapura ===
Marinus made his debut with Persipura Jayapura, when Persipura Jayapura played against Bhayangkara. He scored his first goal in the 52nd minute and was shown a second yellow for his excessive celebration. Marinus claimed to be too excited after scoring the goal after receiving a nice pass from his boyhood idol Boaz Solossa. He said, "when I did the celebration, I did not remember if I already had a yellow card, I never expected to get a red card. I'm too happy to receive the ball from Boaz to score the goal".

==== Bhayangkara (loan) ====
He was signed for Bhayangkara to play in the Liga 1 in the 2018 season, on loan from Persipura Jayapura. Wanewar made his debut on 14 April 2018 in a match against Perseru Serui. On 27 May 2018, Wanewar scored his first goal for Bhayangkara against Borneo in the 63rd minute at the PTIK Stadium, Jakarta. He made 18 league appearances and scored 3 goals for Bhayangkara.

=== Muba Babel United ===
In 2021, Marinus signed a contract with Indonesian Liga 2 club Muba Babel United.

=== Persis Solo ===
In 2021, Marinus Wanewar signed a contract with Indonesian Liga 2 club Persis Solo. He made his league debut on 9 November 2021 in a match against Persijap Jepara at the Manahan Stadium, Surakarta.

=== PSM Makassar ===
After helping Persis win the 2021 Liga 2 title and earn promotion to the top flight, Wanewar played for Liga 1 club PSM Makassar on loan until the end of the 2021–22 season.

== International career ==
He made his international debut for senior team on 8 June 2017, against Cambodia.

== Career statistics ==
=== Club ===
As of match played 1 November 2025

Club	Season	League			Cup		Continental		Other (Note: Appearances in Indonesia President's Cup)		Total	
Club	Season	Division	Apps	Goals	Apps	Goals	Apps	Goals	Apps	Goals	Apps	Goals
Persipura Jayapura	2016	ISC A	13	2	0	0	0	0	0	0	13	2
Persipura Jayapura	2017	Liga 1	19	4	0	0	0	0	2	1	21	5
Persipura Jayapura	2018	Liga 1	0	0	0	0	0	0	0	0	0	0
Persipura Jayapura	2019	Liga 1	5	0	0	0	0	0	0	0	5	0
Persipura Jayapura	2020	Liga 1	0	0	0	0	0	0	0	0	0	0
Persipura Jayapura	Total		37	6	0	0	0	0	2	1	39	7
Bhayangkara (loan)	2018	Liga 1	18	3	0	0	0	0	1	0	19	3
Muba Babel United	2021	Liga 2	0	0	0	0	0	0	0	0	0	0
Persis Solo	2021	Liga 2	1	0	0	0	0	0	0	0	1	0
Persela Lamongan	2022–23	Liga 2	0	0	0	0	–		0	0	0	0
Persipura Jayapura	2023–24	Liga 2	15	1	0	0	–		0	0	15	1
Persipura Jayapura	2024–25	Liga 2	22	1	0	0	–		0	0	22	1
Persipura Jayapura	2025–26	Championship	4	1	0	0	–		0	0	4	1
Persiku Kudus	2026–27	Championship	0	0	0	0	–		0	0	0	0
Career total			97	12	0	0	0	0	3	1	100	13

=== International ===
As of match played 13 June 2017

Appearances and goals by national team and year
National team	Year	Apps	Goals
Indonesia	2017	2	0
Total		2	0

=== International goals ===
International under-23 goals

Goal	Date	Venue	Opponent	Score	Result	Competition
1	21 July 2017	National Stadium, Bangkok, Thailand	Mongolia	2–0	7–0	2018 AFC U-23 Championship qualification
2	20 August 2017	MP Selayang Stadium, Selangor, Malaysia	Timor-Leste	0–1	0–1	2017 Southeast Asian Games
3	20 February 2019	Phnom Penh Olympic Stadium, Phnom Penh, Cambodia	Malaysia	1–0	2–2	2019 AFF U-22 GS
4	22 February 2019	Phnom Penh Olympic Stadium, Phnom Penh, Cambodia	Cambodia	1–0	2–0	2019 AFF U-22 GS
5	22 February 2019	Phnom Penh Olympic Stadium, Phnom Penh, Cambodia	Cambodia	2–0	2–0	2019 AFF U-22 GS

== Honours ==
=== International ===
Indonesia U-23

- AFF U-22 Youth Championship: 2019
- SEA Games bronze medal: 2017

=== Club ===
Persipura Jayapura

- Indonesia Soccer Championship A: 2016

Persis Solo

- Liga 2: 2021

=== Individual ===
- AFF U-22 Youth Championship Top Goalscorer: 2019 (Shared)
