= Lê Xuân Tú =

Vietnamese footballer (born 1999)

Personal information
- Full name: Lê Xuân Tú
- Date of birth: 6 September 1999 (age 27)
- Place of birth: Thọ Xuân, Thanh Hóa, Vietnam
- Height: 1.80 m (5 ft 11 in)
- Position: Forward

Team information
- Current team: Hà Nội
- Number: 25

Youth career
- 2012–2017: PVF Football Academy

Senior career*
Years	Team	Apps	(Gls)
2018–2020	Hồng Lĩnh Hà Tĩnh	14	(2)
2020–	Hà Nội	59	(8)
2023–2024	→ Quảng Nam (loan)	21	(3)

International career^{‡}
2017–2018	Vietnam U19	11	(3)
2019–2022	Vietnam U23	15	(3)
- * Club domestic league appearances and goals as of 7 June 2026 ‡ National team caps and goals as of 26 March 2022

Lê Xuân Tú (born 6 September 1999) is a Vietnamese professional footballer who plays as a forward for V.League 1 club Hà Nội.

== International career ==
=== International goals ===
==== U-19 ====
#	Date	Venue	Opponent	Score	Result	Competition
1.	7 September 2017	Yangon, Myanmar	Brunei	1–0	8–1	2017 AFF U-18 Youth Championship
2.	7 September 2017	Yangon, Myanmar	Brunei	4-1	8–1	2017 AFF U-18 Youth Championship
3.	25 October 2018	Bekasi, Indonesia	South Korea	1–0	1–3	2018 AFC U-19 Championship

==== U-23 ====
#	Date	Venue	Opponent	Score	Result	Competition
1.	19 February 2019	Phnom Penh, Cambodia	Timor-Leste	4–0	4–0	2019 AFF U-22 Youth Championship
2.	26 February 2019	Phnom Penh, Cambodia	Cambodia	1–0	1–0	2019 AFF U-22 Youth Championship
3.	11 October 2021	Dubai, UAE	Tajikistan	1–0	1–1	Friendly

== Honours ==
Hồng Lĩnh Hà Tĩnh

- V.League 2: 2019

Hà Nội

- V.League 1: 2022
- Vietnamese National Cup: 2020, 2022
- Vietnamese Super Cup: 2020, 2022
