= Ahmad Wahyudi =

Indonesian footballer

Personal information
- Full name: Ahmad Wahyudi
- Date of birth: 24 August 2001 (age 25)
- Place of birth: Gresik, Indonesia
- Height: 1.75 m (5 ft 9 in)
- Position: Defender

Youth career
- 2017–2019: Gresik United
- 2020–2021: Persita Tangerang

Senior career*
Years	Team	Apps	(Gls)
2021–2024	Persela Lamongan	8	(0)
2024–2025	Persikabo 1973	12	(0)
2025–2026	Deltras	1	(0)
- * Club domestic league appearances and goals as of 16 November 2025

Ahmad Wahyudi (born 24 August 2001) is an Indonesian professional footballer who plays as a defender. He is the youngest brother of Dimas Drajad.

== Club career ==
=== Persela Lamongan ===
He was signed for Persela Lamongan to play in Liga 1 in the 2021 season. Wahyudi made his professional debut on 2 December 2021 in a match against PSM Makassar at the Moch. Soebroto Stadium, Magelang.

== Career statistics ==
=== Club ===
As of 16 November 2025

Club	Season	League			Cup		Other		Total	
Club	Season	Division	Apps	Goals	Apps	Goals	Apps	Goals	Apps	Goals
Persela Lamongan	2021	Liga 1	4	0	0	0	0	0	4	0
Persela Lamongan	2022	Liga 2	4	0	0	0	0	0	4	0
Persikabo 1973	2024–25	Liga 2	12	0	0	0	0	0	12	0
Deltras	2025–26	Championship	1	0	0	0	0	0	1	0
Career total			21	0	0	0	0	0	21	0
