= Techin Muktarakosa =

Thai footballer

Personal information
- Full name: Techin Muktarakosa
- Date of birth: 18 April 1997 (age 29)
- Place of birth: Thailand
- Height: 1.72 m (5 ft 7 1/2 in)
- Position: Defensive midfielder

Team information
- Current team: Burapha United
- Number: 33

Youth career
- –2016: Bangkok United

Senior career*
| Years | Team | Apps | (Gls) |
| 2015 | TOT | 6 | (1) |
| 2016 | Port | | |
| 2017–2020 | Bangkok United | | |
| 2020–2022 | Krabi | 80 | (3) |
| 2023–2024 | Samut Sakhon City | 17 | (1) |
| 2024–2025 | Navy | 19 | (1) |
| 2025– | Burapha United | 0 | (0) |

International career
| 2019 | Thailand U23 | | |
- * Club domestic league appearances and goals as of 20 April 2025

Techin Muktarakosa (Thai: เตชินท์ มุขธระโกษา; born April 18, 1997) is a Thai professional footballer who plays as a defensive midfielder for Burapha United in the Thai League 3.

== Honours ==
=== Club ===
Krabi

- Thai League 3 runners-up: 2021–22
- Thai League 3 Southern Region: 2021–22

=== International ===
Thailand U-23

- AFF U-22 Youth Championship runner up: 2019
