= Narachai Intha-naka =

Thai footballer (born 1999)

Personal information
- Full name: Narachai Intha-naka
- Date of birth: 27 July 1999 (age 27)
- Place of birth: Thailand
- Height: 1.81 m (5 ft 11 1/2 in)
- Position: Midfielder

Senior career*
Years	Team	Apps	(Gls)
2017–2020	Chiangrai United	1	(0)
2019	→ JL Chiangmai United (loan)		
2020	→ Chiangrai City (loan)		

International career
2019	Thailand U23		
- * Club domestic league appearances and goals

Narachai Intha-naka (Thai: นราชัย อินทนาคา, born February 20, 1999) is a retired Thai professional footballer who plays as a midfielder.

== Honours ==
=== International ===
Thailand U-23

- 2019 AFF U-22 Youth Championship: Runner up
