= Kritsawat Kongkot =

Thai professional footballer

Personal information
- Date of birth: 26 July 1999 (age 27)
- Place of birth: Surat Thani, Thailand
- Height: 1.81 m (5 ft 11 1/2 in)
- Position: Goalkeeper

Senior career*
Years	Team	Apps	(Gls)
2018–2022	Chainat Hornbill	9	(0)
2019	→ Chainat United (loan)	12	(0)
2022–2023	Krabi	0	(0)

International career
- Thailand U19
2019	Thailand U23		
- * Club domestic league appearances and goals as of 30 April 2023

Kritsawat Kongkot (Thai: กฤษน์วัต คงคต, born July 26, 1999) is a Thai professional footballer who plays as a goalkeeper.

== Honours ==
=== International ===
Thailand U-23

- 2019 AFF U-22 Youth Championship: Runner up
