= Luthfi Kamal =

Indonesian footballer (born 1999)

Personal information
- Full name: Muhammad Luthfi Kamal Baharsyah
- Date of birth: 1 March 1999 (age 27)
- Place of birth: Jakarta, Indonesia
- Height: 1.71 m (5 ft 7 in)
- Position: Defensive midfielder

Team information
- Current team: Persis Solo
- Number: 71

Youth career
- 2015: ASIOP Apacinti
- 2016–2017: SSB Bina Taruna

Senior career*
Years	Team	Apps	(Gls)
2018–2020	Mitra Kukar	12	(0)
2020–2021	PSS Sleman	0	(0)
2021–2022	Barito Putera	39	(3)
2023	PSIS Semarang	23	(0)
2023–2025	Bali United	30	(0)
2025–2026	Persikad Depok	23	(1)
2026–	Persis Solo	0	(0)

International career
2017–2018	Indonesia U19	14	(3)
2019–2021	Indonesia U23	12	(1)
Medal record
Men's football
Representing Indonesia
AFF U-19 Youth Championship
Third place	2017 Myanmar
Third place	2018 Indonesia	Team
AFF U-22 Youth Championship
Winner	2019 Cambodia	Team
- * Club domestic league appearances and goals as of 2 May 2026

Muhammad Luthfi Kamal Baharsyah (born 1 March 1999) is an Indonesian professional footballer who plays as a defensive midfielder for Championship club Persis Solo.

== Club career ==
=== PS Mitra Kukar ===
Was born in Jakarta, Luthfi started his professional career with Mitra Kukar in 2018. He made his professional debut on 27 July 2018 in a match against Arema at the Aji Imbut Stadium, Tenggarong

=== PSS Sleman ===
He was signed for PSS Sleman to play in Liga 1 in the 2020 season. This season was suspended on 27 March 2020 due to the COVID-19 pandemic. The season was abandoned and was declared void on 20 January 2021.

=== PS Barito Putera ===
In 2021, Lutfi Kamal signed a contract with Indonesian Liga 1 club Barito Putera. Luthfi made his debut on 4 September 2021 in a match against Persib Bandung. On 17 September, he scored his first goal for Barito Putera in a 1–1 draw over Borneo Samarinda at the Wibawa Mukti Stadium.

=== PSIS Semarang ===
Luthfi Kamal became PSIS Semarang's second recruit in the first half of the 2022–23 Liga 1. PSIS CEO, Yoyok Sukawi explained that Luthfi Kamal was recruited to complete the players in the middle position. Luthfi made his professional debut on 16 January 2023 in a match against RANS Nusantara at the Pakansari Stadium, Bogor.

== International career ==
On 31 May 2017, Luthfi made his debut against Brazil U20 in the 2017 Toulon Tournament in France. And Luthfi is one of the players that strengthen Indonesia U19 in 2018 AFC U-19 Championship.

== Career statistics ==
=== Club ===
As of 2 May 2026

Club	Season	League			Cup		Continental		Other		Total	
Club	Season	Division	Apps	Goals	Apps	Goals	Apps	Goals	Apps	Goals	Apps	Goals
Mitra Kukar	2018	Liga 1	6	0	0	0	–		0	0	6	0
Mitra Kukar	2019	Liga 2	6	0	0	0	–		0	0	6	0
Mitra Kukar	Total		12	0	0	0	–		0	0	12	0
PSS Sleman	2020	Liga 1	0	0	0	0	–		0	0	0	0
Barito Putera	2021–22	Liga 1	28	3	0	0	–		4 (Note: Appearances in Menpora Cup)	0	32	3
Barito Putera	2022–23	Liga 1	11	0	0	0	–		4 (Note: Appearances in Indonesia President's Cup)	0	15	0
Barito Putera	Total		39	3	0	0	–		8	0	47	3
PSIS Semarang	2022–23	Liga 1	13	0	0	0	–		0	0	13	0
PSIS Semarang	2023–24	Liga 1	10	0	0	0	–		0	0	10	0
PSIS Semarang	Total		23	0	0	0	–		0	0	23	0
Bali United	2023–24	Liga 1	12	0	0	0	–		0	0	12	0
Bali United	2024–25	Liga 1	18	0	0	0	–		0	0	18	0
Bali United	Total		30	0	0	0	–		0	0	30	0
Persikad Depok	2025–26	Championship	23	1	0	0	–		0	0	23	1
Career total			127	4	0	0	0	0	8	0	135	4

=== International goals ===
International under-23 goals

Goal	Date	Venue	Opponent	Score	Result	Competition
1	24 February 2019	Phnom Penh Olympic Stadium, Phnom Penh, Cambodia	Vietnam	1–0	1–0	2019 AFF U-22 Youth Championship

== Honours ==
=== International ===
Indonesia U-19

- AFF U-19 Youth Championship third place: 2017, 2018

Indonesia U-22

- AFF U-22 Youth Championship: 2019
