= Saringkan Promsupa =

Thai footballer (born 1997)

Personal information
- Full name: Saringkan Promsupa
- Date of birth: 29 March 1997 (age 29)
- Place of birth: Sisaket, Thailand
- Height: 1.75 m (5 ft 9 in)
- Position: Centre-back

Team information
- Current team: Sukhothai
- Number: 15

Youth career
- 2010–2015: Pluakdaeng Pittayakom School
- 2015: Rayong

Senior career*
Years	Team	Apps	(Gls)
2015–2018	Rayong	41	(3)
2018–2022	Muangthong United	44	(0)
2021–2022	→ Suphanburi (loan)	12	(0)
2022–	Sukhothai	73	(1)

International career^{‡}
2015–2016	Thailand U19	8	(0)
2018–2021	Thailand U23	24	(4)
2024–	Thailand	8	(0)
Medal record
Thailand under-23
Sea Games
Gold medal – first place	Sea Games 2017	Football
Thailand
ASEAN Championship
Runner-up	ASEAN 2024	Team
- * Club domestic league appearances and goals ‡ National team caps and goals as of 18 November 2025

Saringkan Promsupa (Thai: ศฤงคาร พรมสุภะ, born 29 March 1997) is a Thai professional footballer who plays as a centre-back for Thai League 1 club Sukhothai.

== Club career ==
=== Rayong ===
Born in Sisaket, Thailand, Saringkan joined Rayong's youth setup in 2015 by the club's trial, after impressing in the COCA-COLA Cup 2015, he signed a new deal with the club.

In 2015, without any minute in professional level, Saringkan made his professional debut, starting in a 2–3 lost against Ratchaburi in the 2015 Thai League Cup.

=== Muangthong United ===
On 29 June 2018, Saringkan signed for Thai League 1 club, Muangthong United.

== International career ==
=== Youth ===
Saringkarn earned his first cap for the Thailand under-19 squad on 24 August 2015, starting in the 1–1 draw against Laos in 2015 AFF U-19 Youth Championship game. He was part of the victorious under-19 side at the AFF U-19 Youth Championship in Laos under Anurak Srikerd.

Selected for the Thailand under-23 squad in the 2017 Southeast Asian Games by manager Worrawoot Srimaka, Saringkarn played all seven times for the champions.

Saringkarn scored his first international goal on 9 December 2017, netting in a 2–1 win against Japan U23 squad. In the M-150 Cup tournament he was called up by manager Zoran Janković and squad for the 2018 AFC U-23 Championship in China.

=== Senior ===
In November 2024, Saringkarn earned a called up to the Thailand national team squad for a friendly match. On 14 November 2024, he make his international debut playing the full 90th minute against Lebanon. Saringkarn was selected in the Thailand squad for the 2024 ASEAN Championship.

== Honours ==
Thailand U23

- SEA Games gold medal: 2017
- AFF U-22 Youth Championship runner-up: 2019

Thailand U19

- AFF U-19 Youth Championship: 2015

Individual

- AFF U-22 Youth Championship top scorer: 2019 (shared)
