= Nasser Al Yazidi =

Qatari footballer (born 2000)

Personal information
- Full name: Nasser Saleh Nasser Al Yazidi
- Date of birth: 2 February 2000 (age 26)
- Place of birth: Doha, Qatar
- Position: Winger

Team information
- Current team: Al-Wakrah
- Number: 20

Youth career
- Lekhwiya

Senior career*
Years	Team	Apps	(Gls)
2017–2021	Al-Duhail	7	(0)
2020	→ Al Ahli (loan)	2	(0)
2020–2021	→ Umm Salal (loan)	9	(0)
2021–	Al-Wakrah	33	(2)
2022	→ Al-Duhail (loan)	7	(2)

International career^{‡}
2018–	Qatar U20	3	(0)
Medal record
Al-Duhail
Winner	Qatar Stars League	2016–17
Winner	Qatar Stars League	2017–18
- * Club domestic league appearances and goals as of 17 January 2026 ‡ National team caps and goals as of 11:26, 18 July 2018 (UTC)

Nasser Saleh Nasser Al Yazidi (Arabic: ناصر اليزيدي; born 2 February 2000), is a Qatari professional footballer who plays as a winger for Qatar Stars League side Al-Wakrah.

== Club career ==
Al Yazidi made his debut in a 2–2 draw with Al-Shahania, replacing Almoez Ali at half time.

== Career statistics ==
=== Club ===
As of 18 June 2018.

Club	Season	League			Cup		Continental		Other		Total	
Club	Season	Division	Apps	Goals	Apps	Goals	Apps	Goals	Apps	Goals	Apps	Goals
Al-Duhail	2016–17	Qatar Stars League	1	0	0	0	–		0	0	1	0
Al-Duhail	2017–18	Qatar Stars League	1	0	2 (Note: Appearances in the Qatari Stars Cup)	0	1 (Note: Appearances in the AFC Champions League)	0	0	0	4	0
Career total			2	0	2	0	1	0	0	0	5	0
