= Trần Danh Trung =

Vietnamese footballer

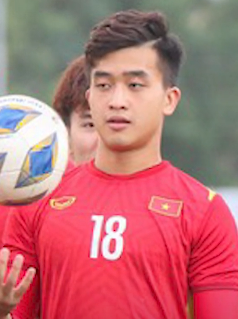
- Danh Trung in 2022

Personal information
- Birth name: Trần Danh Trung
- Date of birth: 3 October 2000 (age 26)
- Place of birth: Hương Trà, Thừa Thiên Huế, Vietnam
- Height: 1.76 m (5 ft 9 in)
- Position: Forward

Team information
- Current team: Thể Công–Viettel
- Number: 6

Youth career
- 2011–2019: Viettel

Senior career*
Years	Team	Apps	(Gls)
2019	→ Huế (loan)	11	(8)
2020–	Thể Công–Viettel	86	(3)

International career^{‡}
2018–2019	Vietnam U19	1	(0)
2019–2021	Vietnam U22	4	(3)
2019–2022	Vietnam U23	2	(0)
- * Club domestic league appearances and goals as of 7 June 2026 ‡ National team caps and goals as of 26 February 2022

Trần Danh Trung (born 3 October 2000) is a Vietnamese professional footballer who plays for V.League 1 club Thể Công–Viettel.

== Honours ==
Viettel

- V.League 1: 2020
- Vietnamese National Cup: Runner-up: 2020
- Vietnamese Super Cup: Runner-up: 2020

=== Individual ===
- AFF U-22 Youth Championship: 2019: Top scorer (Shared)
