= Thọ Xuân =

- Commune
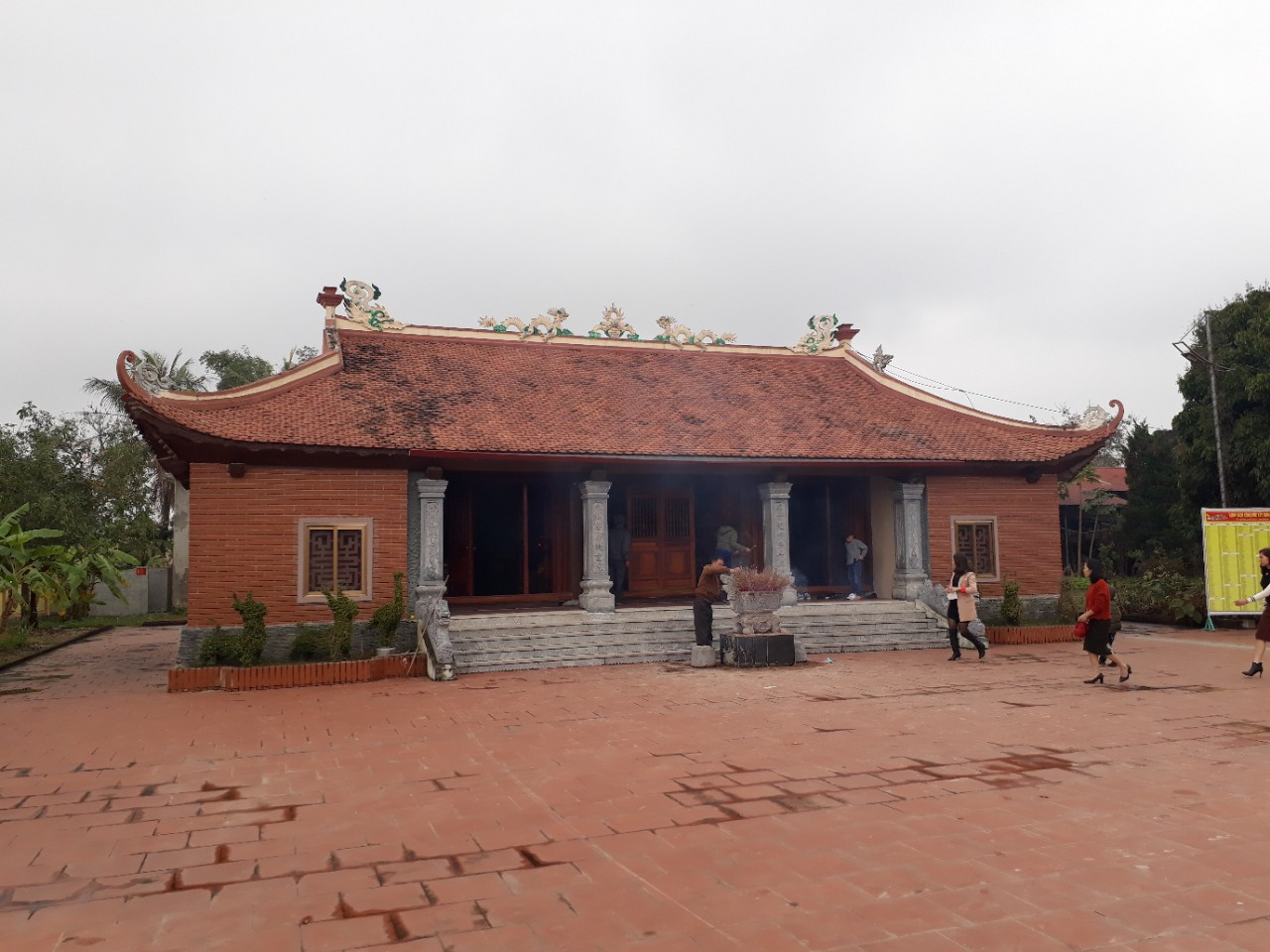
- Xuân Phả Nghè
- Interactive map of Thọ Xuân
- Coordinates: 19°56′18″N 105°32′01″E
- Country: Vietnam
- Region: North Central Coast
- Province: Thanh Hóa
- Established: 16 June 2025
- Administrative headquarters: Thọ Khang 1 Hamlet

Area
  - Total: 27.40 km^{2} (10.58 sq mi)

Population (2024)
  - Total: 34,346
  - Density: 1,253/km^{2} (3,250/sq mi)
- Postal code: 41606
- Website: thoxuan.thanhhoa.gov.vn

Thọ Xuân is a commune in Thanh Hóa province, Vietnam.

On 16 June 2025, Thọ Xuân district was dissolved as part of the 2025 Vietnamese administrative reform, which abolished the district-level administrative system. Thọ Xuân Commune was established under Resolution No. 1686/NQ-UBTVQH15 of the Standing Committee of the National Assembly of Vietnam, through the merger of the entire area and population of Thọ Xuân township and Xuân Hồng, Xuân Trường, and Xuân Giang communes.
