= Khaled Waleed =

Qatari footballer (born 1999)

Personal information
- Full name: Khaled Waleed Mansour
- Date of birth: 25 December 1999 (age 26)
- Place of birth: Qatar
- Height: 1.69 m (5 ft 7 in)
- Position: Midfielder

Team information
- Current team: Umm Salal
- Number: 7

Senior career*
Years	Team	Apps	(Gls)
2016–2017	El Jaish	1	(0)
2017–2020	Al-Duhail	1	(0)
2020–2023	Qatar	36	(0)
2023–	Umm Salal	38	(0)
- * Club domestic league appearances and goals as of 17 January 2026

Khaled Waleed (Arabic:خالد وليد; born 25 December 1999) is a Qatari professional footballer who plays as a midfielder for Umm Salal.
