= Phan Thanh Hậu =

Vietnamese footballer

Personal information
- Full name: Phan Thanh Hậu
- Date of birth: 12 January 1997 (age 29)
- Place of birth: Mộ Đức, Quảng Ngãi, Vietnam
- Height: 1.70 m (5 ft 7 in)
- Position: Central midfielder

Team information
- Current team: Becamex Hồ Chí Minh City
- Number: 8

Youth career
- 2009–2016: Hoàng Anh Gia Lai

Senior career*
Years	Team	Apps	(Gls)
2015–2022	Hoàng Anh Gia Lai	45	(1)
2021	→ Hồ Chí Minh City (loan)	7	(0)
2022	→ Bà Rịa-Vũng Tàu (loan)	18	(0)
2023	Phù Đổng	3	(0)
2023–2025	Quảng Nam	35	(0)
2025–	Becamex Hồ Chí Minh City	21	(0)

International career^{‡}
2014–2016	Vietnam U19	4	(0)
2017–2018	Vietnam U20	2	(0)
- * Club domestic league appearances and goals as of 7 June 2026 ‡ National team caps and goals as of 22 May 2017

Phan Thanh Hậu (born 12 January 1997) is a Vietnamese professional footballer who plays as a central midfielder for V.League 1 club Becamex Hồ Chí Minh City.

He is a product of the Hoang Anh Gia Lai – Arsenal JMG Academy, a joint football academy built by English club Arsenal, JMG Academy, and the Vietnamese cooperation Hoang Anh Gia Lai Group. In 2014, after his performance as a member of the Vietnam U-19 national team at 2014 AFC U-19 Championship, Thanh Hậu was listed by The Guardian as one of the 40 best young football talents in the world.

== International goals ==
=== U23 ===
No.	Date	Venue	Opponent	Score	Result	Competition
1.	19 February 2019	Phnom Penh Olympic Stadium, Phnom Penh, Cambodia	Timor-Leste	3–0	4–0	2019 AFF U-22 Youth Championship

== Honours ==
Vietnam U21

- International U-21 Thanh Niên Newspaper Cup: Runner-up 2017

Vietnam U19

- AFF U-19 Youth Championship: Runner-up 2013, 2014
- Hassanal Bolkiah Trophy: Runner-up 2014
