= Faisol Yunus =

Indonesian association footballer

Personal information
- Full name: Muhammad Faisol Yunus
- Date of birth: 2 February 1997 (age 29)
- Place of birth: Jember, Indonesia
- Height: 1.65 m (5 ft 5 in)
- Positions: Winger; forward

Youth career
- 2014: Jember United
- 2020–2021: PON East Java

Senior career*
Years	Team	Apps	(Gls)
2019–2020	Semeru	15	(8)
2021–2022	Persikab Bandung	24	(16)
2023–2024	Gresik United	18	(0)
2024–2025	Adhyaksa	7	(1)
- * Club domestic league appearances and goals as of 15 February 2025

Muhammad Faisol Yunus (born 2 February 1997) is an Indonesian professional footballer who plays as a winger or forward.

== Club career ==
Born in Jember Regency, at the age of 16, he began his career by joined Jember United that appeared in the Soeratin Cup in 2014 season, and in this season, he also won the title as the best player with Gian Zola. In 2019, he joined Semeru to play in Liga 3. He had a good season in this season with Semeru, while helping the club promotion to Liga 2 for next season after finish in third place in the third round of the eastern group of Liga 3 national zone. His success with the club in the 2019 season led him to join the East Java team to participate in the National Sports Week in 2021.

=== Persikab Bandung ===
In October 2021, Faisol signed a contract with Persikab Bandung. He made his club debut in a match against Persigar Garut on 4 December 2021, scored his first goal with scored a hat-trick in a 9–1 win in the 2021 Liga 3 West Java. He successfully brought his team to the final round of the 2021 Liga 3 West Java zone, and successfully became a champion. He also won the title as the best player. In the Liga 3 National Round, he helped bring the club promoted to the Liga 2 next season after finish runner-up in Group BB in the Round of 16. Faisol contributed this season with the club by scoring 10 goals in Liga 3 Provincial round and 5 goals in Liga 3 National round.

==== 2022–23 season: First time in Liga 2 with Persikab Bandung ====
On 28 August 2022, he started his match in the 2022–23 Liga 2 season for Persikab, playing as a starter in a 1–1 draw over PSIM Yogyakarta. On 4 September 2022, Faisol scored his first goal for Persikab in a 2–3 away win against Persela Lamongan. In his second season with Persikab, Faisol only went on to make 6 appearances and scored one goal, because Liga 2 was suspended due to a tragedy.

=== Gresik United ===
In April 2023, Faisol signed a contract with Gresik United. Faisol made his league debut in a 2–0 win against Persekat Tegal on 10 September 2023, he was also shown a red card in the match in the 89th minute. Faisol was forced to miss two important matches.

== Career statistics ==
=== Club ===
As of 15 February 2025

Club	Season	League			Cup		Continental		Other		Total	
Club	Season	Division	Apps	Goals	Apps	Goals	Apps	Goals	Apps	Goals	Apps	Goals
Semeru	2019	Liga 3	15	8	0	0	–		0	0	15	8
Persikab Bandung	2021–22	Liga 3	18	15	0	0	–		0	0	18	15
Persikab Bandung	2022–23	Liga 2	6	1	0	0	–		0	0	6	1
Gresik United	2023–24	Liga 2	14	0	0	0	–		0	0	14	0
Gresik United	2024–25	Liga 2	4	0	0	0	–		0	0	4	0
Adhyaksa	2024–25	Liga 2	7	1	0	0	–		0	0	7	1
Career total			64	25	0	0	0	0	0	0	64	25
