= Sin Sophanat =

Cambodian footballer

Sin Sophanat ស៊ិន សុផាណាត
Personal information
- Full name: Sin Sophanat
- Date of birth: 20 April 1997 (age 29)
- Place of birth: Phnom Penh, Cambodia
- Height: 1.86 m (6 ft 1 in)
- Position: Centre-back

Team information
- Current team: Visakha
- Number: 20

Senior career*
| Years | Team | Apps | (Gls) |
| 2017– | Visakha | | |

International career
| 2019 | Cambodia U-23 | 5 | (1) |
| 2019– | Cambodia | 11 | (1) |
- * Club domestic league appearances and goals

Sin Sophanat (born 20 April 1997) is a Cambodian footballer who plays for Visakha Cambodian League.

== Club career ==
Sin Sophanat made his senior debut in Cambodia League on 16 March 2019 against Soltilo Angkor.

== International career ==
Sophanat made his debut in 2020 AFC U-23 Championship qualification against Australia national under-23 soccer team on 22 March 2019.

Sophanat scored his first senior international goal on 7 September 2023 in a friendly match against Hong Kong at the Olympic Stadium.

International goals

| List | Date | Venue | Opponent | Score | Result | Competition |
|---|---|---|---|---|---|---|
| 1. | 7 September 2023 | National Olympic Stadium, Phnom Penh, Cambodia | Hong Kong | 1–1 | 1–1 | Friendly |
