= 2019 AFF U-22 Youth Championship =

2019 AFF U-22 Championship
AFF U-22 Youth Championship Cambodia 2019

Tournament details
- Host country: Cambodia
- Dates: 17–26 February
- Teams: 8 (from 1 sub-confederation)
- Venue: 1 (in 1 host city)

Final positions
- Champions: Indonesia (1st title)
- Runners-up: Thailand
- Third place: Vietnam
- Fourth place: Cambodia

Tournament statistics
- Matches played: 16
- Goals scored: 34 (2.13 per match)
- Attendance: 68,659 (4,291 per match)
- Top scorer(s): (Indonesia) Marinus Wanewar (Thailand) Saringkan Promsupa (Vietnam) Trần Danh Trung (3 goals each)
- Fair play award: Cambodia

The 2019 AFF U-22 Youth Championship or AFF U-22 LG Cup 2019 was the 2nd edition of the AFF U-22 Youth Championship organised by the ASEAN Football Federation (AFF). Indonesia won the tournament after defeating Thailand 2–1 in the final. The tournament was held from 17 to 26 February in Phnom Penh, Cambodia. This was its first as an under-22 tournament, with the previous edition being an under-23 tournament. 2005 AFF U-23 Youth Championship winners Thailand were the defending champions, as there was no competition from 2006 to 2018 and the 2011 edition was cancelled.

== Qualified teams ==
There was no qualification. All entrants advanced to the final tournament. The following teams from member associations of the AFF entered the tournament (excluding Australia). Singapore withdrew from the tournament in order to focus on the 2020 AFC U-23 Championship qualification tournament in March. Brunei and Laos also withdrew from the tournament.

Team	Association	Appearance	Previous best performance
Cambodia	FF Cambodia	2nd	Group stage (2005)
Indonesia	FA Indonesia	1st	Debut
Malaysia	FA Malaysia	2nd	Fourth place (2005)
Myanmar	Myanmar FF	2nd	Third place (2005)
Philippines	Philippine FF	2nd	Group stage (2005)
Thailand	FA Thailand	2nd	Champions (2005)
Timor-Leste	FF Timor-Leste	2nd	Group stage (2005)
Vietnam	Vietnam FF	1st	Debut

Did not enter
Australia

Withdrew
Brunei
Laos
Singapore

== Draw ==
The top six teams from the 2005 AFF U-22 Championship were seeded in Pot 1, the remaining teams were in Pot 2. Cambodia were assigned to position B1 as hosts.

Position	2005 top six finishers	Unseeded teams
1	**Thailand**	Cambodia (assigned to B1)
2	Singapore **(W)**	Timor-Leste
3	Myanmar	Australia **(P)**
4	Malaysia	Brunei **(W)**
5	Laos **(W)**	Indonesia
6	Philippines	Vietnam

Notes

- Team in **bold** is the defending champion.
- Team in italic is the host.
- (P): Did not enter.
- (W): Withdrew after draw.

=== Result ===
Group A
Pos	Team
A1	Thailand
A3	Philippines
A4	Timor-Leste
A6	Vietnam

Group B
Pos	Team
B1	Cambodia
B3	Myanmar
B4	Malaysia
B5	Indonesia

== Squads ==
A final squad of 23 players (three of whom must be goalkeepers) must be registered one day before the first match of the tournament.

== Venues ==
Phnom Penh
Olympic Stadium
Capacity: **50,000**
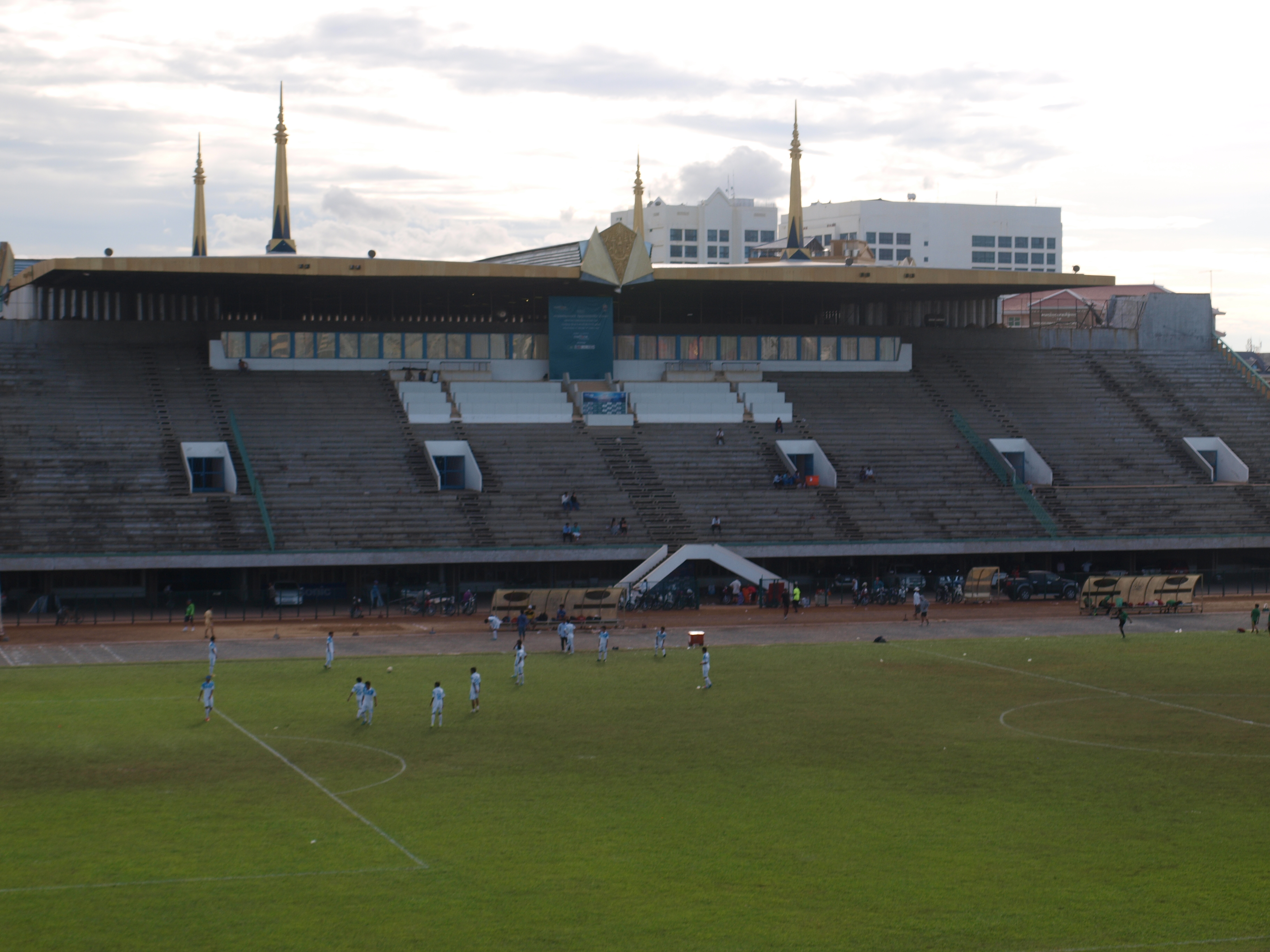

== Group stage ==
All times are local, ICT (UTC+7).

=== Group A ===
Pos	Team	Pld	W	D	L	GF	GA	GD	Pts	Qualification
1	Vietnam	3	2	1	0	6	1	+5	**7**	Knockout stage
2	Thailand	3	2	1	0	4	0	+4	**7**	Knockout stage
3	Timor-Leste	3	1	0	2	1	5	−4	**3**	
4	Philippines	3	0	0	3	1	6	−5	**0**	

Source: AFF
17 February 2019
15:30

Vietnam	2–1	Philippines
Trần Danh Trung 74'; Lê Minh Bình 78'	Report	Borlongan 51'

Olympic Stadium, Phnom Penh
Attendance: 2,223
Referee: Khoun Virak (Cambodia)
17 February 2019
18:30

Thailand	1–0	Timor-Leste
Saringkan 47'	Report

Olympic Stadium, Phnom Penh
Attendance: 847
Referee: Thant Zin Oo (Myanmar)

19 February 2019
15:30

Philippines	0–3	Thailand
	Report	Jaroensak 3'; Jedsadakorn 13'; Saringkan 83'

Olympic Stadium, Phnom Penh
Attendance: 225
Referee: Thoriq Alkatiri (Indonesia)
19 February 2019
18:30

Timor-Leste	0–4	Vietnam
	Report	Trần Danh Trung 40', 62'; Phan Thanh Hậu 82'; Lê Xuân Tú 90+3'

Olympic Stadium, Phnom Penh
Attendance: 2,256
Referee: Abdul Hakim Mohd Haidi (Brunei)

21 February 2019
15:30

Vietnam	0–0	Thailand
	Report

Olympic Stadium, Phnom Penh
Attendance: 2,718
Referee: Khoun Virak (Cambodia)
21 February 2019
18:30

Timor-Leste	1–0	Philippines
Lima 64'	Report

Olympic Stadium, Phnom Penh
Attendance: 50
Referee: Thant Zin Oo (Myanmar)

=== Group B ===
Pos	Team	Pld	W	D	L	GF	GA	GD	Pts	Qualification
1	Cambodia (H)	3	2	0	1	3	2	+1	**6**	Knockout stage
2	Indonesia	3	1	2	0	5	3	+2	**5**	Knockout stage
3	Malaysia	3	1	1	1	3	3	0	**4**	
4	Myanmar	3	0	1	2	1	4	−3	**1**	

Source: AFF
(H) Hosts
18 February 2019
15:30

Myanmar	1–1	Indonesia
Myat Kaung Khant 13'	Report	Rachmat 38'

Olympic Stadium, Phnom Penh
Attendance: 633
Referee: Sivakorn Pu-udom (Thailand)
18 February 2019
18:30

Malaysia	0–1	Cambodia
	Report	Rosib 62'

Olympic Stadium, Phnom Penh
Attendance: 3,875
Referee: Nguyễn Hiền Triết (Vietnam)

20 February 2019
15:30

Indonesia	2–2	Malaysia
Marinus 52'; Witan 77'	Report	Nik Akif 62'; Hadi 86'

Olympic Stadium, Phnom Penh
Attendance: 600
Referee: Steve Supresencia (Philippines)
20 February 2019
18:30

Cambodia	2–0	Myanmar
Safy 26'; Sophanat 50'	Report

Olympic Stadium, Phnom Penh
Attendance: 8,128
Referee: Xaypaseuth Phongsanit (Laos)

22 February 2019
18:30

Malaysia	1–0	Myanmar
Hadi 45'	Report

RSN Stadium, Phnom Penh
Attendance: 115
Referee: Sivakorn Pu-udom (Thailand)
22 February 2019
18:30

Indonesia	2–0	Cambodia
Marinus 19', 83'	Report

Olympic Stadium, Phnom Penh
Attendance: 8,318
Referee: Steve Supresencia (Philippines)

== Knockout stage ==
In the knockout stage, penalty shoot-outs were used to decide the winner if necessary.

=== Bracket ===
Semi-finals
24 February – Phnom Penh
Vietnam	0
**Indonesia**	**1**
24 February – Phnom Penh
Cambodia	0 (3)
**Thailand (p)**	**0 (5)**

Final
26 February – Phnom Penh
**Indonesia**	**2**
Thailand	1
Third Place
26 February – Phnom Penh
**Vietnam**	**1**
Cambodia	0

=== Semi-finals ===
24 February 2019
15:30

Vietnam	0–1	Indonesia
	Report	Luthfi 70'

Olympic Stadium, Phnom Penh
Attendance: 5,150
Referee: Thant Zin Oo (Myanmar)
24 February 2019
18:30

Cambodia	0–0 (a.e.t.)	Thailand
	Report
Penalties
Kimheng (penalty scored); S. Kakada (penalty missed); N. Kakada (penalty scored); Sodavid (penalty scored)	3–5	(penalty scored) Saringkan; (penalty scored) Ritthidet; (penalty scored) Jedsadakorn; (penalty scored) Korawich; (penalty scored) Ballini

Olympic Stadium, Phnom Penh
Attendance: 28,168
Referee: Abdul Hakim Mohd Haidi (Brunei)

=== Third place match ===
26 February 2019
15:30

Vietnam	1–0	Cambodia
Lê Xuân Tú 86'	Report

Olympic Stadium, Phnom Penh
Attendance: 3,234
Referee: Steve Supresencia (Philippines)

=== Final ===
26 February 2019
18:30

Indonesia	2–1	Thailand
Sani 59'; Osvaldo 64'	Report	Saringkan 57'

Olympic Stadium, Phnom Penh
Attendance: 2,119
Referee: Nguyễn Hiền Triết (Vietnam)

== Winners ==
2019 AFF U-22 Youth Championship
(Indonesia)
Indonesia
First title

== Awards ==
Top Scorer Award	Fair Play Award
(Indonesia) Marinus Wanewar (Thailand) Saringkan Promsupa (Vietnam) Trần Danh Trung	Cambodia

== Goalscorers ==
3 goals

- (Indonesia) Marinus Wanewar
- (Thailand) Saringkan Promsupa
- (Vietnam) Trần Danh Trung

2 goals

- (Malaysia) Hadi Fayyadh Razak
- (Vietnam) Lê Xuân Tú

1 goal

- (Cambodia) Sath Rosib
- (Cambodia) Yue Safy
- (Cambodia) Sin Sophanat
- (Indonesia) Luthfi Kamal
- (Indonesia) Osvaldo Haay
- (Indonesia) Rachmat Irianto
- (Indonesia) Sani Rizki Fauzi
- (Indonesia) Witan Sulaeman
- (Malaysia) Nik Akif Syahiran Nik Mat
- (Myanmar) Myat Kaung Khant
- (Philippines) Jeremiah Borlongan
- (Thailand) Jaroensak Wonggorn
- (Thailand) Jedsadakorn Kowngam
- (Timor-Leste) Mouzinho Barreto de Lima
- (Vietnam) Lê Minh Bình
- (Vietnam) Phan Thanh Hậu

== Final ranking ==
Pos	Team	Pld	W	D	L	GF	GA	GD	Pts	Final result
1	Indonesia	5	3	2	0	8	4	+4	11	Champions
2	Thailand	5	2	2	1	5	2	+3	8	Runner up
3	Vietnam	5	3	1	1	7	2	+5	10	Third place
4	Cambodia	5	2	1	2	3	3	0	7	Fourth place
5	Malaysia	3	1	1	1	3	3	0	4	Eliminated in group stage
6	Timor-Leste	3	1	0	2	1	5	−4	3	Eliminated in group stage
7	Myanmar	3	0	1	2	1	4	−3	1	Eliminated in group stage
8	Philippines	3	0	0	3	1	6	−5	0	Eliminated in group stage

Source: Group stage, Knockout stage

== Broadcasters ==
All 16 matches were broadcast live and free to access in Cambodia, some ASEAN countries and internationally via the Football Federation of Cambodia (FFC)'s official Facebook page, although in the Khmer language.

=== ASEAN ===
Country	Broadcaster	Summary	Ref
Cambodia	CBS	All 16 matches live respectively, 15 on MYTV and one on CTN.	
Indonesia	MNC Media	5 Indonesia matches only. Live on RCTI.	
Malaysia	Astro	All 16 matches live in Malay and English on Astro Arena.	
Myanmar	MNTV	3 Myanmar matches only.	
Myanmar	My Sports	3 Myanmar matches only.	
Thailand	PPTV	7 matches (three of Thailand's group stage matches, both semi-finals, the 3rd-place match and the final).	
Vietnam	VTV	All 16 matches live, simulcast on VTV5 and VTV6.	

Host nation
