= 2018 AFC U-19 Championship squads =

Player names marked in bold went on to earn full international caps.

== Group A ==
=== Indonesia ===
Indonesia named their squad on 10 October 2018.

Manager: Indra Sjafri

No.	Pos.	Player	Date of birth (age)	Caps	Goals	Club
1	GK	**Muhammad Riyandi**	3 January 2000 (aged 18)	10	0	(Football Association of Indonesia) Barito Putera
21	GK	Gianluca Rossy	25 July 1999 (aged 19)			(Football Association of Indonesia) Persija Jakarta
23	GK	Aqil Savik	17 January 1999 (aged 19)	7	0	(Football Association of Indonesia) Persib Bandung
2	DF	Kadek Raditya	13 June 1999 (aged 19)	5	0	(Football Association of Indonesia) Persiba Balikpapan
3	DF	**Asnawi Mangkualam**	4 October 1999 (aged 19)	15	0	(Football Association of Indonesia) PSM Makassar
4	DF	David Rumakiek	18 July 1999 (aged 19)			(Football Association of Indonesia) Persipura Jayapura
5	DF	**Nurhidayat**	5 April 1999 (aged 19)	17	0	(Football Association of Indonesia) Bhayangkara
11	DF	**Firza Andika**	12 November 1999 (aged 18)	13	1	(Football Association of Indonesia) PSMS Medan
12	DF	**Rifad Marasabessy**	7 July 1999 (aged 19)	15	1	(Football Association of Indonesia) Madura United
13	DF	**Rachmat Irianto**	3 September 1999 (aged 19)	3	0	(Football Association of Indonesia) Persebaya Surabaya
18	DF	Indra Mustafa	28 June 1999 (aged 19)			(Football Association of Indonesia) Persib Bandung
6	MF	Raffi Syarahil	15 November 2000 (aged 17)	6	0	(Football Association of Indonesia) Barito Putera
7	MF	Luthfi Kamal	1 May 1999 (aged 19)	13	2	(Football Association of Indonesia) Mitra Kukar
8	MF	**Witan Sulaeman**	8 October 2001 (aged 17)	12	5	(Football Association of Indonesia) SKO Ragunan
10	MF	**Egy Maulana Vikri**	7 July 2000 (aged 18)	16	14	(Polish Football Association) Lechia Gdańsk
15	MF	**Saddil Ramdani**	2 January 1999 (aged 19)	18	10	(Football Association of Indonesia) Persela Lamongan
16	MF	Resky Fandi	6 September 1999 (aged 19)	4	1	(Football Association of Indonesia) Martapura
17	MF	**Syahrian Abimanyu**	25 April 1999 (aged 19)	17	2	(Football Association of Indonesia) Sriwijaya
22	MF	Todd Rivaldo	15 March 1999 (aged 19)	7	3	(Football Association of Indonesia) Persipura Jayapura
9	FW	Rafli Mursalim	5 March 1999 (aged 19)	14	11	(Football Association of Indonesia) Mitra Kukar
14	FW	Feby Eka Putra	12 February 1999 (aged 19)	12	4	(Football Association of Indonesia) Bali United
19	FW	**Hanis Saghara Putra**	4 April 1999 (aged 19)	18	6	(Football Association of Indonesia) Bali United
20	FW	Aulia Hidayat	2 May 1999 (aged 19)			(Football Association of Indonesia) Borneo

=== United Arab Emirates ===
United Arab Emirates named their squad on 4 October 2018.

Manager: (France) Ludovic Batelli

No.	Pos.	Player	Date of birth (age)	Club
1	GK	Salem Khairi	22 July 1999 (aged 19)	(United Arab Emirates Football Association) Al-Jazira
17	GK	Suhail Abdulla	26 August 1999 (aged 19)	(United Arab Emirates Football Association) Al-Wasl
22	GK	Rayed Reda	2 April 1999 (aged 19)	(United Arab Emirates Football Association) Al-Ahli
2	DF	Omar Saeed	29 January 1999 (aged 19)	(United Arab Emirates Football Association) Hatta Club
3	DF	Yousif Al-Mheiri	30 November 1999 (aged 18)	(United Arab Emirates Football Association) Al-Wasl
4	DF	Saoud Al-Mahri	18 July 2000 (aged 18)	(United Arab Emirates Football Association) Al-Ain
5	DF	Ahmed Abdulla	16 January 1999 (aged 19)	(United Arab Emirates Football Association) Al-Ahli
6	DF	Omar Ahmad Saleh	1 January 1999 (aged 19)	(United Arab Emirates Football Association) Al-Ahli
12	DF	Abdulrahman Saleh	3 June 1999 (aged 19)	(United Arab Emirates Football Association) Al-Wasl
13	DF	Faris Khalil	8 October 2000 (aged 18)	(United Arab Emirates Football Association) Al-Wasl
14	DF	Sultan Saeed	18 December 2000 (aged 17)	(United Arab Emirates Football Association) Sharjah
21	DF	Fahad Al-Hammadi	21 March 1999 (aged 19)	(United Arab Emirates Football Association) Al-Wahda
7	MF	Khalid Al-Bloushi	22 March 1999 (aged 19)	(United Arab Emirates Football Association) Al-Ain
10	MF	Tahnoon Al-Zaabi	10 April 1999 (aged 19)	(United Arab Emirates Football Association) Al-Wahda
15	MF	Mansor Al-Harbi	14 July 1999 (aged 19)	(United Arab Emirates Football Association) Al-Wahda
18	MF	Eid Khamis	20 May 1999 (aged 19)	(United Arab Emirates Football Association) Al-Ahli
19	MF	Majed Rashed	16 May 2000 (aged 18)	(United Arab Emirates Football Association) Al-Ittihad
8	FW	Ali Saleh	22 January 2000 (aged 18)	(United Arab Emirates Football Association) Al-Wasl
9	FW	Hamdan Al-Mansoori	28 April 1999 (aged 19)	(United Arab Emirates Football Association) Sharjah
11	FW	Rashed Mubarak	8 March 1999 (aged 19)	(United Arab Emirates Football Association) Hatta Club
16	FW	Ahmad Fawzi	26 November 2001 (aged 16)	(United Arab Emirates Football Association) Al-Jazira
20	FW	Fahad Batout	17 October 1999 (aged 19)	(United Arab Emirates Football Association) Al-Ittihad
23	FW	Abdullah Al-Naqbi	25 January 2000 (aged 18)	(United Arab Emirates Football Association) Al-Ahli

=== Qatar ===
Qatar named their squad on 10 October 2018.

Manager: (Portugal) Bruno Pinheiro

No.	Pos.	Player	Date of birth (age)	Club
1	GK	Marwan Badreldin	17 April 1999 (aged 19)	(Qatar Football Association) Al-Ahli
22	GK	**Shehab Ellethy**	18 April 2000 (aged 18)	(Qatar Football Association) Al-Duhail
23	GK	**Salah Zakaria**	24 April 1999 (aged 19)	(Qatar Football Association) Al-Wakrah
2	DF	Nasir Peer	27 January 1999 (aged 19)	(Qatar Football Association) Qatar SC
3	DF	Ahmed Al-Minhali	5 May 1999 (aged 19)	(Qatar Football Association) Al-Sailiya
5	DF	**Yousef Aymen**	21 March 1999 (aged 19)	(Royal Belgian Football Association) Eupen
12	DF	**Homam Ahmed**	25 August 1999 (aged 19)	(Royal Belgian Football Association) Eupen
13	DF	Mohamed Al-Naemi	25 March 2000 (aged 18)	(Qatar Football Association) Al-Duhail
15	DF	**Bahaa Ellethy**	18 April 1999 (aged 19)	(Qatar Football Association) Al-Sadd
19	DF	**Ahmed Suhail**	8 February 1999 (aged 19)	(Qatar Football Association) Al-Sadd
21	DF	Ali Malolah	26 February 1999 (aged 19)	(Royal Spanish Football Federation) Cultural Leonesa
4	MF	Abdullah Ali Saei	17 March 1999 (aged 19)	(Royal Belgian Football Association) Eupen
6	MF	Nasser Al Yazidi	2 February 2000 (aged 18)	(Qatar Football Association) Al-Duhail
8	MF	Nasser Al Ahrak	5 January 1999 (aged 19)	(Royal Spanish Football Federation) Cultural Leonesa
10	MF	**Khaled Mohammed**	7 June 2000 (aged 18)	(Royal Spanish Football Federation) Cultural Leonesa
17	MF	**Mohammed Waad**	18 September 1999 (aged 19)	(Royal Spanish Football Federation) Cultural Leonesa
18	MF	Khaled Waleed	25 December 1999 (aged 18)	(Qatar Football Association) Al-Duhail
20	MF	Ahmed Al-Sibai	6 January 1999 (aged 19)	(Qatar Football Association) Al-Duhail
7	FW	Abdulrasheed Umaru	12 August 1999 (aged 19)	(Royal Belgian Football Association) Eupen
9	FW	**Ahmed Al-Ganehi**	22 September 2000 (aged 18)	(Qatar Football Association) Al-Gharafa
11	FW	Abdullah Murisi	24 August 1999 (aged 19)	(Qatar Football Association) Al-Khor
14	FW	Eisa Palangi	21 February 1999 (aged 19)	(Qatar Football Association) Qatar SC
16	FW	**Hashim Ali**	17 August 2000 (aged 18)	(Royal Spanish Football Federation) Cultural Leonesa

=== Chinese Taipei ===
Chinese Taipei named their squad on 7 October 2018.

Manager: Vom Ca-nhum

No.	Pos.	Player	Date of birth (age)	Club
1	GK	Li Guan-pei	7 May 2000 (aged 18)	(Chinese Taipei Football Association) University of Taipei
18	GK	Lee Bing-han	6 April 2000 (aged 18)	(Chinese Taipei Football Association) National Sports Training Center
22	GK	Lai Po-lun	25 June 1999 (aged 19)	(Chinese Taipei Football Association) Hang Yuen
2	DF	Hou Pin-i	6 May 1999 (aged 19)	(Chinese Taipei Football Association) Kaohsiung Medical University
3	DF	Wang Yi-you	29 November 1999 (aged 18)	(Chinese Taipei Football Association) University of Taipei
4	DF	Fong Shao-Chi	15 February 2000 (aged 18)	(Chinese Taipei Football Association) University of Taipei
5	DF	Kenneth Huang	2 May 1999 (aged 19)	(Chinese Taipei Football Association) Tatung
6	DF	Chin Wen-yen	30 May 2000 (aged 18)	(Chinese Taipei Football Association) University of Taipei
16	DF	Karl Hu-Josefsson	11 May 2001 (aged 17)	(Swedish Football Association) Djurgården
7	MF	Lan Hao-yu	13 January 1999 (aged 19)	(Chinese Taipei Football Association) Ming Chuan University
8	MF	Wu Yen-shu	21 October 1999 (aged 18)	(Chinese Taipei Football Association) National Hualien Senior High School
9	MF	Huang Jyun-wun	8 March 1999 (aged 19)	(Chinese Taipei Football Association) University of Taipei
10	MF	Will Donkin	26 December 2000 (aged 17)	(The Football Association) Crystal Palace
12	MF	Wang Sheng-han	9 March 1999 (aged 19)	(Chinese Taipei Football Association) Ming Chuan University
13	MF	Chiu Po-jui	3 August 1999 (aged 19)	(Chinese Taipei Football Association) Ming Chuan University
17	MF	Miguel Sandberg	5 August 2002 (aged 16)	(Swedish Football Association) Djurgården
19	MF	Tu Shao-chieh	2 January 1999 (aged 19)	(Chinese Taipei Football Association) Ming Chuan University
21	MF	Huang Tzu-ming	18 November 2000 (aged 17)	(Chinese Taipei Football Association) Hualien High School of Agriculture
23	MF	Huang Sheng-chieh	22 February 1999 (aged 19)	(Chinese Taipei Football Association) Ming Chuan University
11	FW	Wang Chung-yu	29 May 1999 (aged 19)	(Chinese Taipei Football Association) Ming Chuan University
14	FW	Lin Wei-chieh	9 October 1999 (aged 19)	(Chinese Taipei Football Association) New Taipei Hsinchuang High School
15	FW	Lin Ming-wei	20 May 2001 (aged 17)	(Chinese Taipei Football Association) New Taipei Hsinchuang High School
20	FW	Chen Po-yu	29 February 2000 (aged 18)	(Chinese Taipei Football Association) National Sports Training Center

== Group B ==
=== Japan ===
Japan named their squad on 2 October 2018.

Manager: Masanaga Kageyama

No.	Pos.	Player	Date of birth (age)	Club
1	GK	Tomoya Wakahara	28 December 1999 (aged 18)	(Japan Football Association) Kyoto Sanga
12	GK	**Kosei Tani**	22 November 2000 (aged 17)	(Japan Football Association) Gamba Osaka
23	GK	**Keisuke Osako**	28 July 1999 (aged 19)	(Japan Football Association) Sanfrecce Hiroshima
2	DF	Shunki Higashi	28 July 2000 (aged 18)	(Japan Football Association) Sanfrecce Hiroshima
3	DF	Yuki Kobayashi	18 July 2000 (aged 18)	(Japan Football Association) Vissel Kobe
4	DF	**Daiki Hashioka**	17 May 1999 (aged 19)	(Japan Football Association) Urawa Red Diamonds
5	DF	**Yukinari Sugawara**	28 June 2000 (aged 18)	(Japan Football Association) Nagoya Grampus
7	DF	**Hiroki Itō**	12 May 1999 (aged 19)	(Japan Football Association) Júbilo Iwata
15	DF	**Ayumu Seko**	7 June 2000 (aged 18)	(Japan Football Association) Cerezo Osaka
17	DF	Hirokazu Ishihara	26 February 1999 (aged 19)	(Japan Football Association) Shonan Bellmare
21	DF	Takuya Ogiwara	23 November 1999 (aged 18)	(Japan Football Association) Urawa Red Diamonds
22	DF	Kennedy Mikuni	23 June 2000 (aged 18)	(Japan Football Association) Aomori Yamada High School
6	MF	Mitsuki Saito	10 January 1999 (aged 19)	(Japan Football Association) Shonan Bellmare
8	MF	Kanya Fujimoto	1 July 1999 (aged 19)	(Japan Football Association) Tokyo Verdy
10	MF	**Hiroki Abe**	28 January 1999 (aged 19)	(Japan Football Association) Kashima Antlers
14	MF	Yuta Goke	10 June 1999 (aged 19)	(Japan Football Association) Vissel Kobe
16	MF	Yuta Taki	29 August 1999 (aged 19)	(Japan Football Association) Shimizu S-Pulse
19	MF	Kota Yamada	10 July 1999 (aged 19)	(Japan Football Association) Yokohama F. Marinos
9	FW	**Takefusa Kubo**	4 June 2001 (aged 17)	(Japan Football Association) FC Tokyo
11	FW	**Kyosuke Tagawa**	11 February 1999 (aged 19)	(Japan Football Association) Sagan Tosu
13	FW	**Taichi Hara**	5 May 1999 (aged 19)	(Japan Football Association) FC Tokyo
18	FW	Koki Saito	10 August 2001 (aged 17)	(Japan Football Association) Yokohama FC
20	FW	**Taisei Miyashiro**	26 May 2000 (aged 18)	(Japan Football Association) Kawasaki Frontale

=== Iraq ===
Manager: Qahtan Chathir Drain

No.	Pos.	Player	Date of birth (age)	Club
1	GK	Haval Bahaalddin	21 December 1999 (aged 18)	(Iraq Football Association)
2	DF	Mohammed Al-Baqer	14 May 2000 (aged 18)	(Iraq Football Association) Al-Sinaa
3	DF	Layth Najm	28 July 2001 (aged 17)	(Iraq Football Association)
4	DF	Hussein Hasan	20 July 1999 (aged 19)	(Iraq Football Association)
5	MF	Ali Mohsin	31 January 2000 (aged 18)	(Iraq Football Association) Al-Zawra'a
6	DF	Abbas Badeea	9 January 2000 (aged 18)	(Iraq Football Association) Al-Minaa
7	FW	Wakaa Ramadhan	17 April 1999 (aged 19)	(Iraq Football Association) Al-Naft
8	MF	Mahdi Hameed	29 October 2000 (aged 17)	(Iraq Football Association) Al-Karkh
9	FW	**Hasan Abdulkareem**	1 January 1999 (aged 19)	(Iraq Football Association) Al-Shorta
10	MF	Ahmed Sartip	20 February 2000 (aged 18)	(Iraq Football Association) Ghaz Al-Shamal
11	MF	**Moamel Abdulridha**	28 March 2000 (aged 18)	(Iraq Football Association) Al-Zawra'a
12	DF	**Hassan Raed**	23 September 2000 (aged 18)	(Iraq Football Association) Al-Karkh
13	MF	Abbas Jassim	2 March 1999 (aged 19)	(Iraq Football Association) Al-Karkh
14	MF	Muntadher Abdul-Amir	6 October 2001 (aged 17)	(Iraq Football Association) Al-Karkh
15	DF	Ali Safaa	20 August 2000 (aged 18)	(Iraq Football Association)
16	MF	Abdul-Sattar Majeed	6 June 1999 (aged 19)	(Iraq Football Association)
17	MF	Zainalabideen Al-Rubaye	2 April 2001 (aged 17)	(Iraq Football Association)
18	DF	Ali Raad	28 April 2000 (aged 18)	(Iraq Football Association) Al-Hudood
19	FW	Ameer Kinani	20 April 2001 (aged 17)	(Iraq Football Association)
20	GK	Moamel Mohammed	27 August 1999 (aged 19)	(Iraq Football Association)
21	GK	Waleed Attiya	4 February 1999 (aged 19)	(Iraq Football Association) Al-Diwaniya
22	DF	Hussein Jasim	13 April 2000 (aged 18)	(Iraq Football Association) Naft Maysan
23	DF	Ali Qasim	23 December 1999 (aged 18)	(Iraq Football Association) Al-Minaa

=== Thailand ===
Thailand named their squad on 15 October 2018.

Manager: Issara Sritaro

No.	Pos.	Player	Date of birth (age)	Club
1	GK	Nopphon Lakhonphon	19 July 2000 (aged 18)	(Football Association of Thailand) Buriram United
13	GK	Kritsawat Kongkot	26 July 1999 (aged 19)	(Football Association of Thailand) Chainat Hornbill
23	GK	Supawat Yokakul	10 February 2000 (aged 18)	(Football Association of Thailand) Pattaya United
3	DF	Kittipong Sansanit	22 March 1999 (aged 19)	(Football Association of Thailand) Assumption United
4	DF	Kritsada Nontharat	16 February 2001 (aged 17)	(Football Association of Thailand) Bangkok United
5	DF	Kritsada Kaman	18 March 1999 (aged 19)	(Football Association of Thailand) Chonburi
6	DF	Kittitach Praniti	30 April 1999 (aged 19)	(Football Association of Thailand) Chonburi
14	DF	Sarawut Munjit	4 January 2000 (aged 18)	(Football Association of Thailand) Buriram United
15	DF	Sampan Kesi	3 July 1999 (aged 19)	(Football Association of Thailand) Chonburi
17	DF	Saranyu Plangwan	28 May 1999 (aged 19)	(Football Association of Thailand) Udon Thani
21	DF	Anusak Jaiphet	23 June 1999 (aged 19)	(Football Association of Thailand) Police Tero
2	MF	Sakunchai Saengthopho	7 June 1999 (aged 19)	(Football Association of Thailand) Muangthong United
7	MF	Nattawut Chootiwat	24 June 1999 (aged 19)	(Football Association of Thailand) Chonburi
10	MF	Ekanit Panya	21 October 1999 (aged 18)	(Football Association of Thailand) Chiangmai
16	MF	Peerapat Kaminthong	22 March 2000 (aged 18)	(Football Association of Thailand) Buriram United
18	MF	Hassawat Nopnate	17 February 2000 (aged 18)	(Football Association of Thailand) Assumption United
19	MF	Thirapak Prueangna	15 August 2001 (aged 17)	(Football Association of Thailand) Buriram United
20	MF	Airfan Doloh	26 January 2001 (aged 17)	(Football Association of Thailand) Buriram United
8	FW	Sittichok Paso	28 January 1999 (aged 19)	(Football Association of Thailand) Chonburi
9	FW	Mehti Sarakham	21 May 1999 (aged 19)	(Football Association of Thailand) Buriram United
11	FW	Suphanat Mueanta	2 August 2002 (aged 16)	(Football Association of Thailand) Buriram United
12	FW	Korrawit Tasa	7 April 2000 (aged 18)	(Football Association of Thailand) Muangthong United
22	FW	Yutpichai Lertlam	21 April 1999 (aged 19)	(Football Association of Thailand) Buriram United

=== North Korea ===
Manager: Ri Chol

No.	Pos.	Player	Date of birth (age)	Club
1	GK	Kim Ju-song	13 November 1999 (aged 18)	(DPR Korea Football Association)
2	DF	Jang Un-gwang	28 December 2000 (aged 17)	(DPR Korea Football Association)
3	DF	Pak Kwang-chon	12 January 1999 (aged 19)	(DPR Korea Football Association) Ryomyong
4	DF	Ri Hyon-mu	2 February 2000 (aged 18)	(DPR Korea Football Association)
5	DF	Kim Kyong-sok	19 February 2000 (aged 18)	(DPR Korea Football Association) Sonbong
6	MF	Kang Song-jin	5 October 1999 (aged 19)	(DPR Korea Football Association) Amrokkang
7	FW	Kim Hwi-hwang	25 January 2000 (aged 18)	(DPR Korea Football Association) Pyongyang City
8	MF	Kye Tam	6 October 2000 (aged 18)	(DPR Korea Football Association) Pyongyang City
9	FW	Kim Kuk-jin	11 October 2000 (aged 18)	(DPR Korea Football Association)
10	MF	Kim Pom-hyok	15 April 2000 (aged 18)	(DPR Korea Football Association) Pyongyang City
11	FW	Ri Kang-guk	10 January 2001 (aged 17)	(DPR Korea Football Association) Ryomyong
12	MF	Jong In-sok	25 March 2000 (aged 18)	(DPR Korea Football Association) April 25
13	MF	Sin Kwang-sok	3 December 2000 (aged 17)	(DPR Korea Football Association) Ryomyong
14	DF	Jon Yong-song	7 January 1999 (aged 19)	(DPR Korea Football Association) Ryomyong
15	MF	Kang Kuk-chol	29 September 1999 (aged 19)	(DPR Korea Football Association) Rimyongsu
16	MF	Kim Ji-song	19 February 1999 (aged 19)	(DPR Korea Football Association) Chobyong
17	DF	Yun Min	3 July 2000 (aged 18)	(DPR Korea Football Association) Ryomyong
18	GK	Sin Tae-song	30 May 2000 (aged 18)	(DPR Korea Football Association) Pyongyang City
19	FW	Kim Kwang-chong	19 February 2002 (aged 16)	(DPR Korea Football Association)
20	MF	Kim Ju-Il	2 January 2001 (aged 17)	(DPR Korea Football Association)
21	GK	Sin Kwang-guk	23 June 2001 (aged 17)	(DPR Korea Football Association)

== Group C ==
=== Vietnam ===
Vietnam named their squad on 11 October 2018.

Manager: Hoàng Anh Tuấn

No.	Pos.	Player	Date of birth (age)	Club
1	GK	Y Êli Niê	8 January 2001 (aged 17)	(Vietnam Football Federation) Đắk Lắk
13	GK	Huỳnh Hữu Tuấn	2 February 2000 (aged 18)	(Vietnam Football Federation) Phố Hiến
22	GK	Dương Tùng Lâm	22 May 1999 (aged 19)	(Vietnam Football Federation) Hà Nội
2	DF	Nguyễn Lý Nam Cung	15 February 2000 (aged 18)	(Vietnam Football Federation) Phố Hiến
3	DF	Thái Bá Sang	21 May 1999 (aged 19)	(Vietnam Football Federation) Sông Lam Nghệ An
4	DF	Đặng Văn Tới	12 January 1999 (aged 19)	(Vietnam Football Federation) Hà Nội
5	DF	**Bùi Hoàng Việt Anh**	1 January 1999 (aged 19)	(Vietnam Football Federation) Hà Nội
6	DF	**Đoàn Văn Hậu**	19 April 1999 (aged 19)	(Vietnam Football Federation) Hà Nội
12	DF	Nguyễn Cảnh Anh	12 January 2000 (aged 18)	(Vietnam Football Federation) Hoàng Anh Gia Lai
20	DF	Dụng Quang Nho	1 January 2000 (aged 18)	(Vietnam Football Federation) Hoàng Anh Gia Lai
23	DF	Nguyễn Hùng Thiện Đức	8 December 1999 (aged 18)	(Vietnam Football Federation) Becamex Bình Dương
7	MF	**Lê Văn Xuân**	27 February 1999 (aged 19)	(Vietnam Football Federation) Hà Nội
8	MF	**Trương Tiến Anh**	25 April 1999 (aged 19)	(Vietnam Football Federation) Viettel
9	MF	Lê Xuân Tú	6 September 1999 (aged 19)	(Vietnam Football Federation) PVF
10	MF	Trần Bảo Toàn	14 July 2000 (aged 18)	(Vietnam Football Federation) Hoàng Anh Gia Lai
14	MF	Trần Văn Công	15 February 1999 (aged 19)	(Vietnam Football Federation) Hà Nội
16	MF	Nguyễn Văn Văn	19 May 2000 (aged 18)	(Vietnam Football Federation) Hoàng Anh Gia Lai
21	MF	Mai Sỹ Hoàng	1 January 1999 (aged 19)	(Vietnam Football Federation) Sông Lam Nghệ An
11	FW	**Nhâm Mạnh Dũng**	12 April 2000 (aged 18)	(Vietnam Football Federation) Viettel
15	FW	Nguyễn Hữu Thắng	19 May 2000 (aged 18)	(Vietnam Football Federation) Viettel
17	FW	Trần Danh Trung	3 October 2000 (aged 18)	(Vietnam Football Federation) Viettel
18	FW	Lê Minh Bình	25 December 1999 (aged 18)	(Vietnam Football Federation) Hoàng Anh Gia Lai
19	FW	Lê Văn Nam	30 October 1999 (aged 18)	(Vietnam Football Federation) Hà Nội

=== South Korea ===
South Korea named their squad on 12 October 2018.

Manager: Chung Jung-yong

No.	Pos.	Player	Date of birth (age)	Club
1	GK	Min Seong-jun	22 July 1999 (aged 19)	(Korea Football Association) Korea University
21	GK	Lee Gwang-yeon	11 September 1999 (aged 19)	(Korea Football Association) Incheon National University
23	GK	Choi Min-soo	26 February 2000 (aged 18)	(German Football Association) Hamburger SV
2	DF	Hwang Tae-hyeon	29 January 1999 (aged 19)	(Korea Football Association) Ansan Greeners
3	DF	Lee Jae-ik	21 May 1999 (aged 19)	(Korea Football Association) Gangwon
4	DF	Lee Ji-sol	9 July 1999 (aged 19)	(Korea Football Association) Daejeon Citizen
5	DF	Kim Hyun-woo	7 March 1999 (aged 19)	(Croatian Football Federation) Dinamo Zagreb
12	DF	Choi Jun	17 April 1999 (aged 19)	(Korea Football Association) Yonsei University
13	DF	Lee Kyu-hyuk	4 May 1999 (aged 19)	(Korea Football Association) Dongguk University
15	DF	Choe Hee-won	11 May 1999 (aged 19)	(Korea Football Association) Chung-Ang University
17	DF	Lee Sang-jun	14 October 1999 (aged 19)	(Korea Football Association) Busan IPark
22	DF	Kim Jae-sung	15 July 1999 (aged 19)	(Korea Football Association) Dongguk University
6	MF	Jeong Ho-jin	6 August 1999 (aged 19)	(Korea Football Association) Korea University
8	MF	Go Jae-hyun	5 March 1999 (aged 19)	(Korea Football Association) Daegu FC
14	MF	Park Tae-jun	19 January 1999 (aged 19)	(Korea Football Association) Seongnam FC
16	MF	Goo Boon-cheul	11 October 1999 (aged 19)	(Korea Football Association) Dankook University
19	MF	Kim Se-yun	29 April 1999 (aged 19)	(Korea Football Association) Daejeon Citizen
20	MF	Kim Kang-yeon	26 May 2000 (aged 18)	(Korea Football Association) Yongdungpo Technical High School
7	FW	Jeon Se-jin	9 September 1999 (aged 19)	(Korea Football Association) Suwon Samsung Bluewings
9	FW	**Oh Se-hun**	15 January 1999 (aged 19)	(Korea Football Association) Ulsan Hyundai
10	FW	Cho Young-wook	5 February 1999 (aged 19)	(Korea Football Association) FC Seoul
11	FW	**Um Won-sang**	6 January 1999 (aged 19)	(Korea Football Association) Ajou University
18	FW	Lim Jae-hyeok	6 February 1999 (aged 19)	(Korea Football Association) Daegu FC

=== Australia ===
Australia named their squad on 6 October 2018.

Manager: Ante Milicic

No.	Pos.	Player	Date of birth (age)	Club
1	GK	James Delianov	20 October 1999 (aged 18)	(Football Australia) Melbourne City
12	GK	Macklin Freke	6 January 1999 (aged 19)	(Football Australia) Brisbane Roar
18	GK	Đuro Dragićević	7 July 1999 (aged 19)	(Football Australia) Sydney FC
2	DF	**Nathaniel Atkinson**	13 June 1999 (aged 19)	(Football Australia) Melbourne City
3	DF	Tass Mourdoukoutas	3 March 1999 (aged 19)	(Football Australia) Western Sydney Wanderers
4	DF	Con Ouzounidis	8 October 1999 (aged 19)	(The Football Association) Everton
5	DF	Dylan Pierias	20 February 2000 (aged 18)	(Football Australia) Melbourne City
13	DF	Walter Scott	2 October 1999 (aged 19)	(Football Australia) Perth Glory
15	DF	Dylan Ryan	10 June 2000 (aged 18)	(Royal Dutch Football Association) Willem II
19	DF	Mathieu Cordier	8 March 1999 (aged 19)	(Football Australia) Western Sydney Wanderers
20	DF	Tate Russell	24 August 1999 (aged 19)	(Football Australia) Western Sydney Wanderers
6	MF	Sebastian Pasquali	7 November 1999 (aged 18)	(Royal Dutch Football Association) AFC Ajax
8	MF	Ramy Najjarine	23 April 2000 (aged 18)	(Football Australia) Melbourne City
10	MF	**Connor Metcalfe**	5 November 1999 (aged 18)	(Football Australia) Melbourne City
14	MF	Christian Theoharous	6 December 1999 (aged 18)	(German Football Association) Borussia Mönchengladbach
16	MF	Angus Thurgate	8 February 2000 (aged 18)	(Football Australia) Newcastle Jets
17	MF	Joshua Cavallo	13 November 1999 (aged 18)	(Football Australia) Melbourne City
7	FW	Moudi Najjar	26 June 2000 (aged 18)	(Football Australia) Melbourne City
9	FW	**John Iredale**	1 July 1999 (aged 19)	(Royal Dutch Football Association) SC Heerenveen
11	FW	**Ben Folami**	8 June 1999 (aged 19)	(The Football Association) Ipswich Town
21	FW	Oliver Puflett	26 July 1999 (aged 19)	(Football Australia) Western Sydney Wanderers
22	FW	**Apostolos Stamatelopoulos**	9 April 1999 (aged 19)	(Football Australia) Adelaide United
23	FW	John Roberts	20 January 2001 (aged 17)	(Football Australia) Western Sydney Wanderers

=== Jordan ===
Jordan named their squad on 4 October 2018.

Manager: Ahmed Abdel-Qader

No.	Pos.	Player	Date of birth (age)	Club
1	GK	**Abdallah Al-Fakhouri**	22 January 2000 (aged 18)	(Jordan Football Association) Al-Wehdat
12	GK	Waleed Ibrahim	16 February 1999 (aged 19)	(Jordan Football Association) Al-Jazeera
22	GK	**Ahmad Juaidi**	9 April 2001 (aged 17)	(Jordan Football Association) Shabab Al-Ordon
2	DF	**Danial Afaneh**	24 March 2001 (aged 17)	(Jordan Football Association) Al-Wehdat
3	DF	Yazan Afaneh	7 January 1999 (aged 19)	
5	DF	Hadi Omar Ahmed	14 March 2000 (aged 18)	(Jordan Football Association) Al-Ramtha
13	DF	Shoqi Al-Quz'a	14 January 1999 (aged 19)	(Jordan Football Association) Shabab Al-Ordon
14	DF	Bassam Daldoom	13 October 1999 (aged 19)	
23	DF	**Yousef Abualjazar**	25 October 1999 (aged 18)	(Jordan Football Association) Al-Ramtha
4	MF	Saif Al-Sheibat	14 March 1999 (aged 19)	
6	MF	**Nizar Al-Rashdan**	23 March 1999 (aged 19)	(Jordan Football Association) Al-Hussein
7	MF	Omar Al-Zebdieh	27 June 1999 (aged 19)	(Jordan Football Association) Al-Faisaly
8	MF	Ibrahim Sami	27 April 2000 (aged 18)	
9	MF	Mohammad Bani Atieh	13 February 1999 (aged 19)	(Jordan Football Association) Al-Faisaly
11	MF	Hamza Al-Saifi	3 February 1999 (aged 19)	(Jordan Football Association) Al-Jazeera
16	MF	Ahmad Al-Awawdeh	28 April 2000 (aged 18)	
19	MF	Mo'ath Al-Ammouri	29 August 1999 (aged 19)	(Jordan Football Association) Al-Wehdat
10	FW	Khaled Kourdi	5 June 2000 (aged 18)	(Jordan Football Association) Al-Arabi
15	FW	**Yazan Al-Naimat**	4 June 1999 (aged 19)	(Jordan Football Association) Sahab
17	FW	**Mohammad Aburiziq**	1 February 1999 (aged 19)	(Jordan Football Association) Al-Baqa'a
18	FW	**Ali Olwan**	26 March 2000 (aged 18)	(Jordan Football Association) Al-Jazeera
20	FW	Mohammad Al-Zu'bi	15 April 1999 (aged 19)	(Jordan Football Association) Al-Ramtha
21	FW	Khaled Zakaria Eid	8 September 2000 (aged 18)	

== Group D ==
=== Saudi Arabia ===
Manager: Khaled Al-Atwi

No.	Pos.	Player	Date of birth (age)	Club
1	GK	Nawaf Al-Ghamdi	21 January 1999 (aged 19)	(Saudi Arabian Football Federation) Al-Hilal
21	GK	Mohammed Al-Dawsari	2 October 1999 (aged 19)	(Saudi Arabian Football Federation) Al-Shabab
22	GK	Abdulrahman Al-Shammari	9 July 2000 (aged 18)	(Saudi Arabian Football Federation) Al-Nassr
2	DF	**Saud Abdulhamid**	18 July 1999 (aged 19)	(Saudi Arabian Football Federation) Al-Ittihad
3	DF	Khalifah Al-Dawsari	2 January 1999 (aged 19)	(Saudi Arabian Football Federation) Al-Qadsiah
4	DF	Naif Almas	18 January 2000 (aged 18)	(Saudi Arabian Football Federation) Al-Nassr
5	DF	**Hassan Tambakti**	9 February 1999 (aged 19)	(Saudi Arabian Football Federation) Al-Shabab
6	DF	Mukhair Al-Rashidi	20 May 1999 (aged 19)	(Saudi Arabian Football Federation) Al-Fayha
12	DF	Mohammed Al-Shanqiti	15 May 1999 (aged 19)	(Saudi Arabian Football Federation) Al-Nassr
13	DF	Muhannad Al-Shanqeeti	12 March 1999 (aged 19)	(Saudi Arabian Football Federation) Ohod
16	DF	Hazim Al-Zahrani	23 April 1999 (aged 19)	(Saudi Arabian Football Federation) Al-Ittihad
8	MF	Hamed Al-Ghamdi	2 April 1999 (aged 19)	(Saudi Arabian Football Federation) Al-Ettifaq
10	MF	**Turki Al-Ammar**	24 September 1999 (aged 19)	(Saudi Arabian Football Federation) Al-Shabab
14	MF	Mansor Al Beshe	24 April 2000 (aged 18)	(Saudi Arabian Football Federation) Al-Hilal
15	MF	Faraj Al-Ghashayan	29 April 2000 (aged 18)	(Saudi Arabian Football Federation) Al-Nassr
17	MF	Ibrahim Mahnashi	18 November 1999 (aged 18)	(Saudi Arabian Football Federation) Al-Ettifaq
18	MF	Abdulaziz Al-Dhuwayhi	3 May 2000 (aged 18)	(Saudi Arabian Football Federation) Al-Najma
23	MF	**Abdulmohsen Al-Qahtani**	5 June 1999 (aged 19)	(Saudi Arabian Football Federation) Al-Qadsiah
7	FW	Salem Al-Salem	14 March 1999 (aged 19)	(Saudi Arabian Football Federation) Al-Hilal
9	FW	**Firas Al-Buraikan**	14 May 2000 (aged 18)	(Saudi Arabian Football Federation) Al-Nassr
11	FW	Khalid Al-Ghannam	8 November 2000 (aged 17)	(Saudi Arabian Football Federation) Al-Qadsiah
19	FW	Safi Al-Zaqrati	19 April 1999 (aged 19)	(Saudi Arabian Football Federation) Al-Ahli
20	FW	**Abdullah Al-Hamdan**	13 September 1999 (aged 19)	(Saudi Arabian Football Federation) Al-Shabab

=== Tajikistan ===
Tajikistan named their squad on 9 October 2018.

Manager: Mubin Ergashev

No.	Pos.	Player	Date of birth (age)	Club
1	GK	Khomidzhon Isokov	8 February 2000 (aged 18)	(Tajikistan Football Federation) Barkchi
16	GK	Shohrukh Qirghizboev	1 May 2002 (aged 16)	(Tajikistan Football Federation) Barkchi
23	GK	Mehvar Sulaymonov	29 October 2000 (aged 17)	Unattached
2	DF	Khuseyn Nurmatov	18 September 2000 (aged 18)	(Tajikistan Football Federation) Barkchi
3	DF	Vahdat Hanonov	25 July 2000 (aged 18)	(Tajikistan Football Federation) Barkchi
4	DF	Sultonshoh Mirzoev	4 September 2000 (aged 18)	(Tajikistan Football Federation) Barkchi
5	DF	Manucher Safarov	31 May 2001 (aged 17)	(Tajikistan Football Federation) Barkchi
6	DF	Mahmadzarifi Abdurahim	29 January 2001 (aged 17)	(Tajikistan Football Federation) Barkchi
12	DF	Oyatullo Safarov	19 December 2000 (aged 17)	(Tajikistan Football Federation) Barkchi
13	DF	Alisher Barotov	10 September 1999 (aged 19)	(Tajikistan Football Federation) Vaksh Khatlon
19	DF	Huvaidoi Gulmurod	5 October 2000 (aged 18)	(Tajikistan Football Federation) Barkchi
22	DF	Naimdzhon Ibrogimzoda	11 July 1999 (aged 19)	(Tajikistan Football Federation) Vaksh Khatlon
7	MF	Karomatullo Saidov	12 October 1999 (aged 19)	(Tajikistan Football Federation) Vaksh Khatlon
8	MF	Saidmukhtor Azimov	9 June 2000 (aged 18)	(Tajikistan Football Federation) Barkchi
9	MF	Sharafdzhon Solehov	14 December 1999 (aged 18)	(Tajikistan Football Federation) Barkchi
15	MF	Shervoni Mabatshoev	4 December 2000 (aged 17)	(Tajikistan Football Federation) Barkchi
17	MF	Ehson Panjshanbe	12 May 1999 (aged 19)	(Tajikistan Football Federation) Istiklol
18	MF	Daler Yodgorov	1 May 2000 (aged 18)	(Tajikistan Football Federation) Barkchi
20	MF	Ziyovuddin Fuzaylov	7 March 2000 (aged 18)	(Tajikistan Football Federation) Barkchi
21	MF	Abdulmumin Zabirov	4 August 2001 (aged 17)	(Tajikistan Football Federation) Barkchi
10	FW	Sheriddin Boboev	21 April 1999 (aged 19)	(Tajikistan Football Federation) Istiklol
11	FW	Nuriddin Khamrokulov	19 April 1999 (aged 19)	(Tajikistan Football Federation) Barkchi
14	FW	Tokhir Maladustov	12 September 2000 (aged 18)	(Tajikistan Football Federation) Barkchi

=== China PR ===
China named their squad on 15 October 2018.

Manager: Cheng Yaodong

No.	Pos.	Player	Date of birth (age)	Club
1	GK	Peng Peng	24 November 2000 (aged 17)	(Chinese Football Association) Shanghai Shenhua
12	GK	Yan Bingliang	3 April 2000 (aged 18)	(Royal Spanish Football Federation) Villarreal
23	GK	Qi Yuxi	21 November 2000 (aged 17)	(Chinese Football Association) Jiangsu Suning
2	DF	**Wu Shaocong**	20 March 2000 (aged 18)	(Japan Football Association) Kyoto Sanga
3	DF	Chen Guoliang	2 February 1999 (aged 19)	(Royal Spanish Football Federation) Jumilla
4	DF	Wang Xianjun	1 June 2000 (aged 18)	(Chinese Football Association) Dalian Yifang
5	DF	**Zhu Chenjie**	23 August 2000 (aged 18)	(Chinese Football Association) Shanghai Shenhua
6	DF	**Jiang Shenglong**	24 December 2000 (aged 17)	(Chinese Football Association) Shanghai Shenhua
13	DF	Sun Qinhan	21 March 2000 (aged 18)	(Chinese Football Association) Shanghai Shenhua
18	DF	**Xu Haofeng**	27 January 1999 (aged 19)	(Chinese Football Association) Tianjin Quanjian
21	DF	**He Yupeng**	5 December 1999 (aged 18)	(Chinese Football Association) Dalian Yifang
22	DF	**Wen Jiabao**	2 January 1999 (aged 19)	(Chinese Football Association) Guangzhou Evergrande
8	MF	Xu Lei	11 January 2000 (aged 18)	(Chinese Football Association) Shanghai Shenhua
14	MF	Yang Yilin	23 February 1999 (aged 19)	(Royal Spanish Football Federation) Jumilla
15	MF	Liu Chaoyang	9 June 1999 (aged 19)	(Chinese Football Association) Shandong Luneng Taishan
16	MF	Xu Yue	10 November 1999 (aged 18)	(Chinese Football Association) Shanghai Shenhua
17	MF	**Xu Haoyang**	15 January 1999 (aged 19)	(Chinese Football Association) Shanghai Shenhua
20	MF	Chen Ao	17 July 2000 (aged 18)	(Chinese Football Association) Hebei China Fortune
7	FW	**Tao Qianglong**	20 November 2001 (aged 16)	(Chinese Football Association) Hebei China Fortune
9	FW	Guo Tianyu	5 March 1999 (aged 19)	(Chinese Football Association) Shandong Luneng Taishan
10	FW	Liu Ruofan	28 January 1999 (aged 19)	(Chinese Football Association) Shanghai Shenhua
11	FW	Liu Guobo	27 November 1999 (aged 18)	(Chinese Football Association) Beijing Guoan
19	FW	Wang Jinze	15 March 1999 (aged 19)	(Chinese Football Association) Guangzhou Evergrande

=== Malaysia ===
Malaysia named their squad on 15 October 2018.

Manager: (Croatia) Bojan Hodak

No.	Pos.	Player	Date of birth (age)	Club
1	GK	Syakir Danial	30 March 2000 (aged 18)	(Football Association of Malaysia) Perak TBG
22	GK	Azri Ghani	30 April 1999 (aged 19)	(Football Association of Malaysia) FELDA United
23	GK	Shafiq Afifi	6 August 1999 (aged 19)	(Football Association of Malaysia) PKNP
2	DF	Shivan Pillay	7 December 2000 (aged 17)	(Football Association of Malaysia) PKNS
3	DF	Ahmad Tasnim Fitri	19 January 1999 (aged 19)	(Football Association of Malaysia) FELDA United
5	DF	Anwar Ibrahim	10 June 1999 (aged 19)	(Football Association of Malaysia) FELDA United
6	DF	Nabil Hakim Bokhari	9 February 1999 (aged 19)	(Football Association of Malaysia) Kuala Lumpur FA
14	DF	Azhar Apandi	16 May 1999 (aged 19)	(Football Association of Malaysia) Kuala Lumpur FA
15	DF	Feroz Baharudin	2 April 2000 (aged 18)	(Football Association of Malaysia) Johor Darul Ta'zim III
16	DF	Al-Imran Halim	16 February 1999 (aged 19)	(Football Association of Malaysia) UiTM
18	DF	Syaiful Alias	12 January 1999 (aged 19)	(Football Association of Malaysia) Kelantan FA
4	MF	Zahril Azri	4 February 1999 (aged 19)	(Football Association of Malaysia) FELDA United
8	MF	Nik Akif	11 May 1999 (aged 19)	(Football Association of Malaysia) Kelantan FA
12	MF	Izreen Izwandy	16 July 2000 (aged 18)	(Football Association of Malaysia) Melaka United
13	MF	Izzuddin Roslan	8 December 1999 (aged 18)	(Football Association of Malaysia) Kuala Lumpur FA
17	MF	Thivandaran Karanan	8 March 1999 (aged 19)	(Football Association of Malaysia) Penang FA
20	MF	Ammar Akhmall Alias	12 January 1999 (aged 19)	(Football Association of Malaysia) Felcra
21	MF	Ramadhan Saifullah	9 December 2000 (aged 17)	(Football Association of Malaysia) Johor Darul Ta'zim III
7	FW	Nurfais Johari	27 March 1999 (aged 19)	(Football Association of Malaysia) Penang FA
9	FW	Arif Shaqirin	13 March 2000 (aged 18)	(Football Association of Malaysia) PKNP
10	FW	Hadi Fayyadh	22 January 2000 (aged 18)	Unattached
11	FW	Akhyar Rashid	1 May 1999 (aged 19)	(Football Association of Malaysia) Kedah FA
19	FW	Zafuan Azeman	10 June 1999 (aged 19)	(Football Association of Malaysia) Kedah FA
