= Sam Li =

Sam Li may refer to:

- Li Sirong (born 2003), Chinese footballer
- Samathur Li (born 1973), Hong Kong businessman
