= Tianjin Jinmen Tiger F.C. =

Chinese professional football club

Tianjin Jinmen Tiger 天津津门虎
- Full name: Tianjin Jinmen Tiger Football Club 天津津门虎足球俱乐部
- Nickname: 津门虎 (Jinmen Tigers)
- Founded: 1951; 75 years ago (as North China); 1956; 70 years ago (as Tianjin F.C.); 16 February 1998; 28 years ago (as Tianjin TEDA)
- Ground: TEDA Soccer Stadium, Tianjin
- Capacity: 36,390
- Owner: Tianjin Sports Bureau
- Head coach: Yu Genwei
- League: Chinese Super League
- 2026: Chinese Super League, 12th of 16
- Website: jmtfc.com.cn
Home colours	Away colours

Tianjin Jinmen Tiger Football Club (Chinese: 天津津门虎足球俱乐部; pinyin: Tiānjīn Jīnmén Hǔ Zúqiú Jùlèbù) is a Chinese professional football club based in Tianjin, that competes in the Chinese Super League, the top tier of Chinese football. Tianjin Jinmen Tiger plays its home matches at the TEDA Soccer Stadium, located within Binhai. The founding owners of the team were TEDA Holding (the sponsorship name was derived from the initials of Tianjin Economic-Technological Development Area), a state-owned conglomerate of China. Tianjin Jinmen Tiger is one of the four clubs to have never been relegated from the Chinese top-flight since the Chinese Super League's foundation in 2004.

The club's predecessor was called Tianjin Football Club and they predominantly played in the top tier, where they won several domestic league and cup titles. In 1993, the club was reorganized to become a completely professional football club. In 1998, they were reformed as Tianjin TEDA Football Club (Chinese: 天津泰达足球俱乐部; pinyin: Tiānjīn Tàidá Zúqiú Jùlèbù). Since then, they have won the 2011 Chinese FA Cup and were runners-up in the 2010 Chinese Super League season. In 2021, they changed their name to Tianjin Jinmen Tiger Football Club.

According to Forbes, Tianjin is the 8th most valuable football team in China, with a team value of $84 million, and an estimated revenue of $15 million in 2015.

== History ==
=== Tianjin Football Club ===
The club's first incarnation came in 1951 when the local government sports body decided to take part in China's first fully nationalized football league tournament and decided to merge the best players from Beijing and Tianjin to create the North China Football Team. The team name was taken from the football team in the 1910 multi-sport event Chinese National Games that also represented the same regions. The team ended up finishing fourth in their debut season and with the football league gradually expanding, the team was allowed to separate themselves from Beijing and the local government sports body were allowed to reformed the club as Tianjin Football Team in 1956. The players were mainly from the United White team that lost to the United Red team in the finals of the 1956 Chinese National Olympic Football Trial. The club took part in the expanding 1957 Chinese national football league tournament where they ended the campaign as runners-up at the end of the season. By 1959, the club would hire from within and promoted former team captain Zeng Xuelin as their manager, who would return this good faith by winning the 1960 league title as well as the Chinese FA Cup. For the next several seasons, Tianjin would now become regular title contenders. However, the Cultural Revolution halted football within the country and when it returned, Zeng Xuelin had already left to join the Beijing Football Team.

Tianjin Football Club logo used between 1995-1998

The club brought in Sun Xiafeng to manage the team and he would make sure Tianjin was still a force within the league when he guided the club to the runners-up spot at the end of the 1974 league season, where they narrowly lost the league title to Bayi Football Team on goal difference. His reign at the club was, however, short-lived, and it wasn't until Tianjin brought in Yan Dejun in 1977 that the club would taste any further success. While his first few seasons were not particularly eventful, he would go on to assemble a team built-up of young local players such as Lü Hongxiang, Zuo Shusheng, and Chen Jingang. The players he assembled would go on to mature in the 1980 league season, when Tianjin won the league title at the end of the campaign after a twenty-year wait. With Tianjin allowed to field a B team within the second tier, the club would now have a steady supply of youngsters coming into the team to fight for places, which made sure the 1980 title win wasn't a one-off, when the club won the 1983 North League title. This would, however, be Yan Dejun's last piece of silverware with the club and despite coming close on several occasions, he would leave the team in 1987. It was also during this period that the Chinese Football Association was demanding more professionalism from all the Chinese teams. Unfortunately for the club, this was a transitional period for the team and they were relegated to the second tier at the end of the 1991 league season. Strangely enough, the club's management decided to miss the 1992 league season and spent the whole year in the Netherlands preparing the squad for full professionalism, which the club converted to in 1993.

=== Professionalism ===
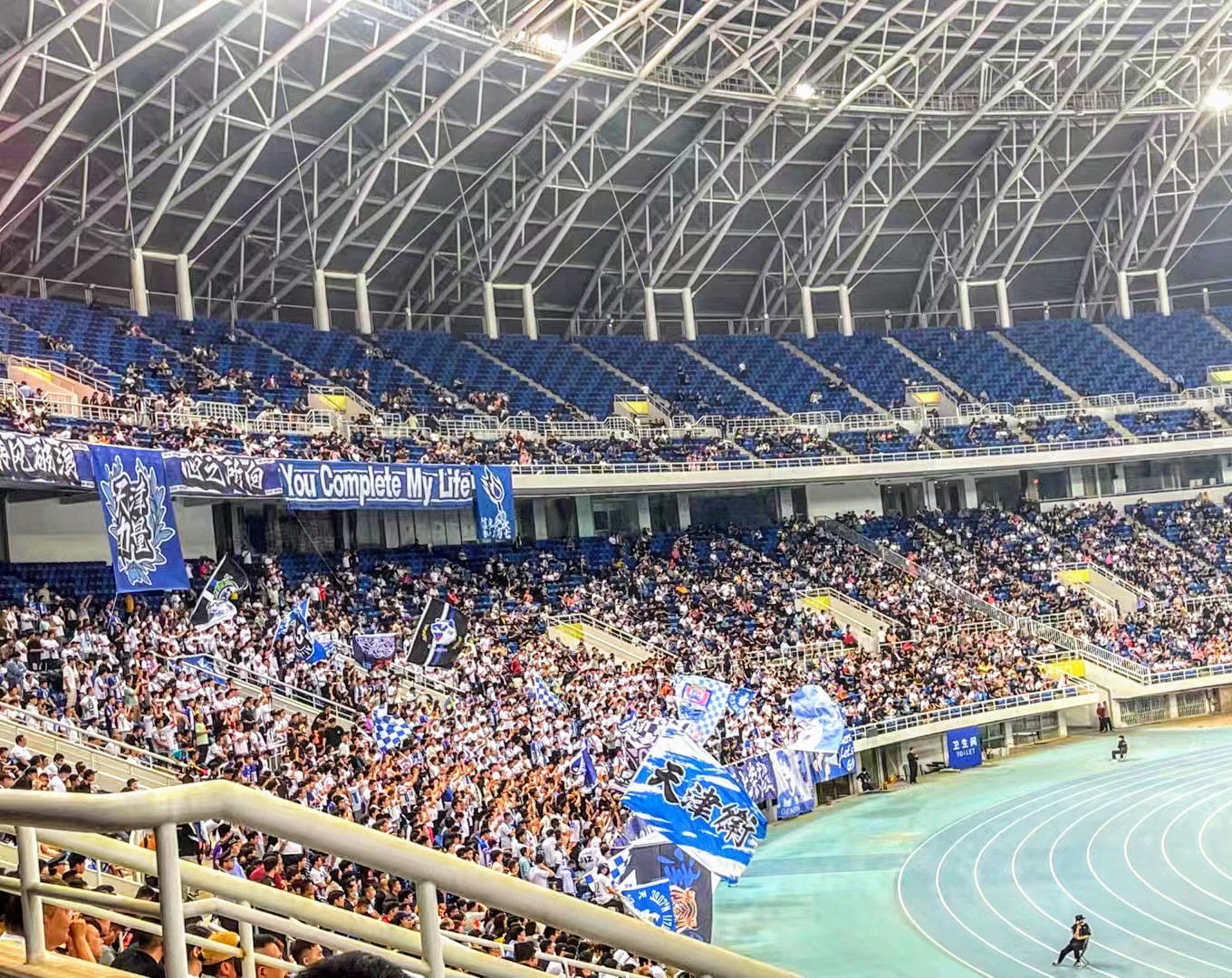
Jinmen Tigers fans

Tianjin TEDA F.C. logo used between1998-2010

With the Chinese football leagues fully professional by 1994, Tianjin brought in Lin Xinjiang to manage the club, where he guided them to a runners-up position and promotion back into the top tier at the end of the season. With the club back in the top tier, they soon gained their first sponsorship deal with Samsung in 1995. On the field, they achieved enough to remain within the league until Lin Xinjiang left the club, and they were soon relegated to the second tier once again at the end of the 1997 league season. On February 16, 1998, the TEDA Group (derived from the initials of Tianjin Economic – Technological Development Area) took over the club for 50 million yuan, along with lower league local rivals Tianjin Vanke, to form Tianjin TEDA F.C. for the start of the 1998 Chinese league season. The club would bring in their first-ever foreign coach and immediately win promotion back to the top tier by winning the division title. The club struggled to remain within the top division and often found themselves in the lower half of the league. While this may have been enough to avoid relegation for the previous seasons, the Chinese Football Association decided to employ an averaging system for the 2003 league campaign, which would also take into account the 2002 league results. It seemed like the club would be relegated once again unless they beat title chasers Shanghai COSCO Sanlin on the final league game of the season, which they unexpectedly did, winning the game 2–1. It was discovered that the result was too good to be true and that the general manager Yang Yifeng bribed the Shanghai COSCO Sanlin players Shen Si, Qi Hong, Jiang Jin, and Li Ming to forfeit the game. With the Chinese FA attempting to clean up its image over match-fixing, they decided that despite the incidents taking place over 10 years ago, it would retroactively punish the club on February 18, 2013, with a 1 million Yuan fine and a 6-point deduction at the beginning of the 2013 Chinese Super League season.

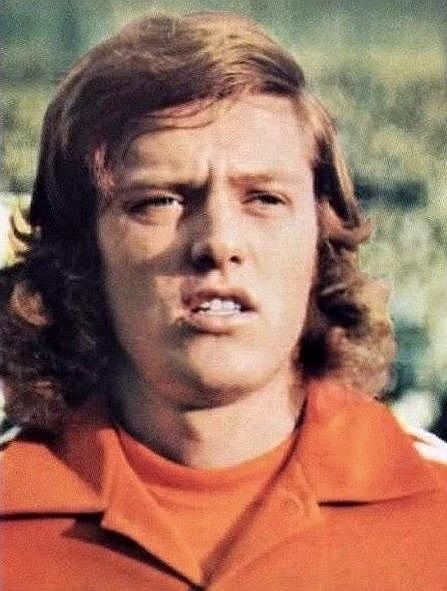
Arie Haan guided the club to a runners-up spot at the end of the 2010 CSL season

Tianjin remained in the Chinese top tier while it re-branded itself as the Chinese Super League. They also affiliated themselves with Australian A-League Club Melbourne Victory in 2007. They achieved little until the club brought in former player Zuo Shusheng to manage the team during the 2008 league season, when he revitalised the team and guided the club to their first-ever entry to the AFC Champions League. At the beginning of the 2009 league season, the club brought in Li Guangyi as their new general manager. However, on August 18, the players went on strike during a training session after it was discovered he wanted to change the club's pay system, which would have shrunken the players' wages, and it was not until the club's owner, Liu Huiwen, heard the players' representatives that the strike ended. After the strike, its leaders, such as Chinese internationals Yang Jun and Han Yanming and Chinese U-23 player Tan Wangsong, would be frozen out of the team and eventually released, while back on the field the club's results declined as they were unable to replicate the previous season's achievements. By the following season, the club would bring in former Chinese international manager Arie Haan, where he guided the club to a runners-up spot at the end of the 2010 league season. He would then guide the club to a last 16 position within the 2011 AFC Champions League and then lead the club to win their first piece of professional silverware when they won the 2011 Chinese FA Cup.

In subsequent seasons, they struggled and declined in league positions.

In late 2017, the club brought in German Uli Stielike who was the former Germany national football team assistant manager and South Korea national football team manager. The club did not improve during the 2018 Chinese Super League and finished the season just above the relegation spots. In the 2019 season, the club fought back and managed to place 7th.

During the 2020 season, Stielike was fired halfway through the season with Wang Baoshan hired to revive the team. TEDA was placed last at the end of the regular season. It had a winless league season with three draws. TEDA also became the first team in CSL history to suffer a winless season. Additionally, this season was the worst season in terms of points for both TEDA and any team in CSL history. As an outcome, TEDA sparked the public anger of many of its fans. Plenty of them went on social media such as Weibo to criticize the team and expressed their deep dissatisfaction towards the players, the coach, as well as the club officials. The team managed to win two of six relegation playoffs matches, which eventually placed them at tenth at the end of the season.

=== Dramatic revival ===
Since the end of the 2020 season, a series of reports revealed the fact that the team would be discontinued by the TEDA group. The team did not regroup for winter training, while players began to terminate their contracts and moved to other teams. Many claimed that their salaries were unpaid. On 28 February 2021, Tianjin Jinmen Tiger failed to submit entrance files for the 2021 season, when it came to a consensus that the team would possibly not participate in the 2021 CSL, although the team remained silent about the issue. On 23 March, the day when the CFA was supposed to publish the entry list for the 2021 season, sources claimed that Tianjin Jinmen Tiger would re-submit necessary files for participation, while the publication was actually postponed. A few days later, Tianjin Tigers was officially listed among other 2021 CSL teams.

In 2026, Tianjin Jinmen Tiger started the 2026 Chinese Super League season with 10 points deducted for violation of sports ethics and loss of sportsmanship, engaging in improper transactions to seek illegitimate benefits.

== Name history ==
- 1956–1992: Tianjin (天津市足球队)
- 1993–1997: Tianjin F.C. (天津足球俱乐部)
- 1998–2020: Tianjin TEDA (天津泰达)
- 2021–: Tianjin Jinmen Tiger (天津津门虎)

== Grounds ==
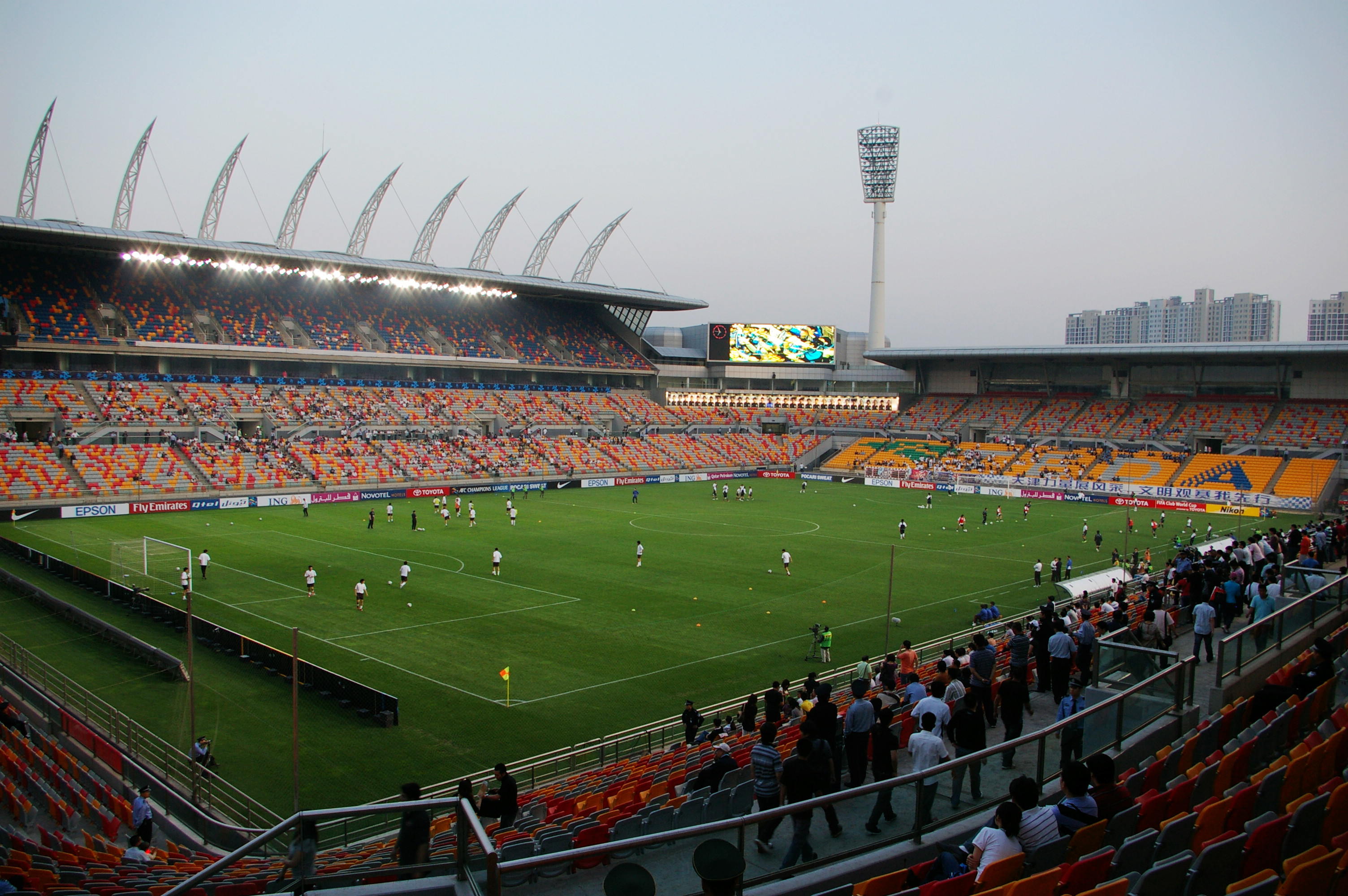
TEDA Football Stadium

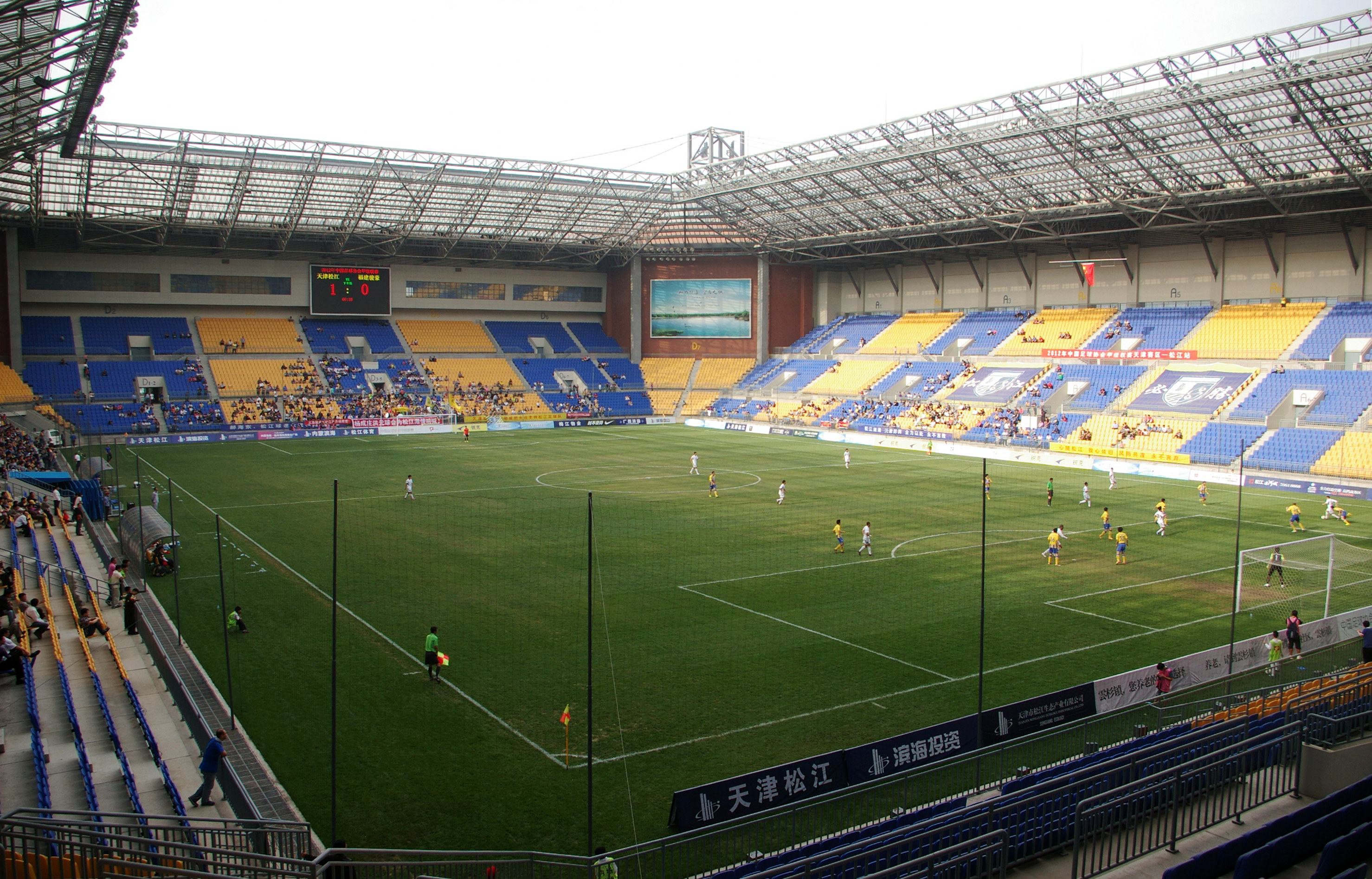
Tianjin Tuanbo Soccer Stadium in 2012

The TEDA Football Stadium (Chinese: 泰达足球场), with a capacity of 36,390 people, is a football stadium in Tianjin, China. It is the current home of Tianjin Jinmen Tiger and was built in 2004. The stadium is located in the Tianjin Economic-Technological Development Area (TEDA), and was designed by Peddle Thorp, an Australian architecture firm.

== Rivalries ==
The Jing-Jin derby is a local rivalry between Tianjin Jinmen Tiger and neighboring Beijing Guoan. Both teams can trace their histories to the North China Football Team before it split to form Tianjin and Beijing. Since then, both clubs have predominantly remained within the top tier of Chinese football, providing a constant rivalry fixture which has led to intense matches that have spilled out away from the stadiums and onto the streets that have led to property destruction as well as further intensifying their relationship. Also, Tianjin Tianhai was considered their rival and developed during recent years due to the separation of some Tianjinese fans. The two teams used the same ground in the 2019 season. Nevertheless, this rivalry came to an end following the dissolution of Tianhai in 2020.

== Current squad ==
=== First-team squad ===
As of July 2026

Note: Flags indicate national team as defined under FIFA eligibility rules; some limited exceptions apply. Players may hold more than one non-FIFA nationality.

No.	Pos.	Nation	Player
3	DF	CHN	Wang Zhenghao
4	DF	CHN	Yang Fan
6	DF	CHN	Wang Xianjun
7	FW	BRA	Guilherme Schettine
8	MF	POR	Xadas
9	FW	ESP	Alberto Quiles
10	FW	ESP	Cristian Salvador
11	FW	CHN	Xie Weijun
14	MF	CHN	Huang Jiahui
16	MF	CHN	Liu Shuai
17	MF	CHN	Wu Xinghan (on loan from Shandong Taishan)
18	DF	ESP	Aitor Córdoba
19	FW	CHN	Liu Junxian
20	FW	CHN	Ji Shengpan

No.	Pos.	Nation	Player
21	GK	CHN	Qi Yuxi
22	MF	CHN	Li Yongjia
24	DF	CHN	Chen Zhexuan
25	GK	CHN	Yan Bingliang
26	GK	CHN	Zhang Haoran
28	MF	CHN	Guo Hao
29	FW	CHN	Ba Dun
30	MF	CHN	Wang Qiuming (captain)
31	MF	HKG	Sun Ming Him
33	MF	CHN	Naibo Ninglin
38	DF	CHN	Li Shuaiqi
39	DF	CHN	Cai Chengjun
40	MF	CHN	Shi Yan

=== Reserve squad ===
Note: Flags indicate national team as defined under FIFA eligibility rules; some limited exceptions apply. Players may hold more than one non-FIFA nationality.

No.	Pos.	Nation	Player

=== Out on loan ===
Note: Flags indicate national team as defined under FIFA eligibility rules; some limited exceptions apply. Players may hold more than one non-FIFA nationality.

No.	Pos.	Nation	Player
—	GK	CHN	Li Yuefeng (at Xiamen Feilu until 31 December 2026)
—	DF	ESP	Jaume Grau (at Shanghai Port until 31 December 2026)
—	DF	CHN	Li Sirong (at Qingdao Hainiu until 31 December 2026)

=== Retired numbers ===
12 – Club Supporters (the 12th Man) The number was retired in January 2016.

== Coaching staff ==
Position	Staff
Head coach	(China) Yu Genwei
General Coordinator	(China) Wang Jun
Assistant Coach	(China) Zhang Chaosong
Assistant Coach	(China) Sun Jianjun
Assistant Coach	(Spain) Alejandro Esteve
Goalkeeping Coach	(China) Wang Lüe
Fitness Coach	(Spain) Ignacio Gonzalo
Assistant Coach	(China) Tan Wangsong

=== Managerial history ===
Semi-pro seasons:

- (China) Liu Shifan (caretaker) (1951)
- (China) Li Chaogui (first official head coach) (1956)
- (China) Shao Xiankai (1957–59)
- (China) Zeng Xuelin (1959–72)
- (China) Sun Xiafeng (1973–75)
- (China) Shen Furu (1975–77)
- (China) Yan Dejun (1977–87)
- (China) Shen Furu (1988–90)
- (China) Zhang Yanan (1991)
- (China) Zuo Shusheng (Jan 1, 1992 – Dec 31, 1992)
- (China) Shen Furu (1993)

Professional seasons:

- (China) Lin Xinjiang (1994–96)
- (China) Zuo Shusheng (1996–1997)
- (China) Chen Jingang (1997)
- (China) Lin Xinjiang (1998)
- (Uruguay) Osvaldo Giménez (1998)
- (China) Jin Zhiyang (1999–00)
- (China) Liu Junhong (caretaker) (2000)
- (Uruguay) Nelson Agresta (2000–02)
- (Italy) Giuseppe Materazzi (2003)
- (China) Liu Junhong (caretaker) (2003)
- (China) Qi Wusheng (2004)
- (China) Liu Chunming (2004–06)
- (Czech Republic) Jozef Jarabinský (2007–08)
- (China) Zuo Shusheng (May 14, 2008 – Dec 1, 2009)
- (Netherlands) Arie Haan (Dec 1, 2009 – Dec 31, 2011)
- (Croatia) Josip Kuže (Jan 1, 2012 – May 27, 2012)
- (Costa Rica) Alexandre Guimarães (June 1, 2012 – Dec 31, 2013)
- (Netherlands) Arie Haan (Jan 12, 2014 – Dec 18, 2015)
- (Serbia) Dragan Okuka (Dec 18, 2015 – Aug 1, 2016)
- (Portugal) Jaime Pacheco (Aug 2, 2016 – May 30, 2017)
- (South Korea) Lee Lim-saeng (May 30, 2017 – August 14, 2017)
- (China) Chi Rongliang (caretaker) (August 14, 2017 – September 10, 2017)
- (Germany) Uli Stielike (September 11, 2017 – August 19, 2020)
- (China) Wang Baoshan (August 19, 2020 – 2021)
- (China) Yu Genwei (April 2021 – Present)

== Honours ==
All-time honours list, including semi-professional Tianjin Football Club period.

=== League ===
- Chinese Jia-A League
  - Winners (3): 1960, 1980, 1983 (Shared)
- Chinese Jia-B League
  - Winners (1): 1998

=== Cup ===
- Chinese FA Cup
  - Winners (2): 1960, 2011
  - Runners-up (1): 1956

=== Reserve team ===
- Coca-Cola Olympic League Champions: 1996
- Reserve League Champions: 2007

=== Youth ===
U-19 Team

- U19 FA Cup Winners: 2005

U-15 Team

- U15 Winners Cup Winners: 2006

=== Minor trophies ===
- Lord Mayor's Cup:
  - Winners (1): 2009

== Results ==
All-time league rankings

As of the end of 2023 season.

Year	Div	Pld	W	D	L	GF	GA	GD	Pts	Pos.	FA Cup	Super Cup	League Cup	AFC	Other	Att./G	Stadium
1956	–	–	–	–	–	–	–	–	–	–	RU	–	–				
1957	1	20	15	3	2	48	18	30	53	RU	NH	–	–				
1958	1	21	8	7	6	34	20	14	44	3	NH	–	–				
1960	1	13	9	3	1	25	10	15	9^{1}	W	W	–	–				
1961	1	17	7	9	1	23	11	12	10^{1}	3	NH	–	–				
1962	1	19	9	8	2	31	16	15	12^{1}	4	NH	–	–				
1963	1	10	3	2	5	16	18	−2	3^{1}	3	NH	–	–				
1964	1	22	8	8	6	15	17	−2	24	5	NH	–	–				
1965	1	11	3	4	4	10	9	1	10	7	NH	–	–				
1973	1	24	14	4	6	35	18	17	16^{1}	5	NH	–	–				
1974	1	18	13	4	1	39	13	26	15^{1}	RU	NH	–	–				
1976	1	8	6	1	1	16	4	12	13	1^{2}	NH	–	–				
1977	1	13	10	1	2	24	10	14		6	NH	–	–				
1978	1	30	13	11	6	39	29	10	37	4	NH	–	–				
1979	1	30	13	8	9	36	24	12	34	6	NH	–	–				
1980	1	29	16	9	4	34	14	20	41	W	NH	–	–				
1981	1	30	17	–	13				34	7	NH	–	–				
1982	1	30	–	19	11	47	27	20	38	3	NH	–	–				
1983	1	16	12	–	4	24	11	13	24	W^{3}	NH	–	–				
1984	1	30	21	–	9	47	28	19	42	RU	4	–	–				
1985	1	15	8	–	7			11	16	8	5	–	–				
1986	1	14	7	5	2	20	11	9	19	4	6	–	–				
1987	1	14	6	6	2	19	13	6	24	RU	NH	–	–				
1988	1	25	11	9	5	29	14	15	48.5	3	NH	–	–				
1989	1	14	5	3	6	13	13	0	19	5	NH	–	–				
1990	1	14	5	6	3	17	11	6	22	5	Group	–	–				
1991	1	14	2	2	10	8	22	−14	6	8	Group	–	–				
1992	1	–	–	–	–	–	–	–	–	–	R2	–	–				
1993	2	9	5	1/0	3	13	10	3	4^{1}	3	NH	–	–				
1994	2	20	9	10	1	32	22	10	28	RU	NH	–	–	DNE			Minyuan Stadium
1995	1	22	7	3	12	20	40	−20	24	8	R1	DNQ	–			19,173	Minyuan Stadium
1996	1	22	6	8	8	20	30	−10	26	8	R2	DNQ	–			20,345	Minyuan Stadium
1997	1	22	5	8	9	20	28	−8	23	11	R2	DNQ	–			17,091	Minyuan Stadium
1998	2	22	11	11	0	42	20	22	44	W	R2	DNQ	–				Minyuan Stadium
1999	1	26	8	11	7	32	28	4	35	7	R1	DNQ	–			13,692	Minyuan Stadium
2000	1	26	7	10	9	28	37	−9	31	10	R2	DNQ	–			13,692	Minyuan Stadium
2001	1	26	10	6	10	38	31	7	36	7	QF	DNQ	–			10,154	Minyuan Stadium
2002	1	28	9	7	12	37	36	1	34	10	QF	DNQ	–			9,250	Minyuan Stadium
2003	1	28	8	12	8	32	33	−1	36	10	R16	DNQ	–			13,000	Minyuan Stadium
2004	1	22	7	8	7	28	29	−1	29	6	R2	NH	SF			13,182	Minyuan Stadium; TEDA Soccer Stadium
2005	1	26	14	7	5	48	26	22	49	4	R1	NH	R1			16,462	Minyuan Stadium; TEDA Soccer Stadium
2006	1	28	10	10	8	40	38	2	40	6	QF	NH	NH			18,071	Minyuan Stadium; TEDA Soccer Stadium
2007	1	28	12	8	8	31	22	9	44	6	NH	NH	NH			15,429	TEDA Soccer Stadium
2008	1	30	16	9	5	54	29	25	57	4	NH	NH	NH			14,007	TEDA Soccer Stadium
2009	1	30	12	9	9	36	29	7	45	6	NH	NH	NH	Group		14,554	TEDA Soccer Stadium
2010	1	30	13	11	6	37	29	8	50	RU	NH	NH	NH			14,757	TEDA Soccer Stadium
2011	1	30	8	13	9	37	41	−4	37	10	W	NH	NH	R16		18,242	TEDA Soccer Stadium; Tianjin Olympic Center Stadium
2012	1	30	10	10	10	29	30	−1	40	8	R4	RU	NH	Group		14,175	TEDA Soccer Stadium
2013	1	30	11	7	12	35	39	−4	34^{4}	11	R4	DNQ	NH			16,577	Tianjin Olympic Center Stadium; TEDA Soccer Stadium
2014	1	30	10	9	11	41	44	−3	39	7	R3	DNQ	NH			17,190	Tianjin Olympic Center Stadium; TEDA Soccer Stadium
2015	1	30	7	10	13	39	46	−7	31	13	R4	DNQ	NH			19,661	Tianjin Olympic Center Stadium
2016	1	30	9	9	12	38	50	−12	36	10	R4	DNQ	NH			22,081	Tianjin Olympic Center Stadium
2017	1	30	8	7	15	30	49	−19	31	13	R4	DNQ	NH			14,531	Tianjin Tuanbo Football Stadium
2018	1	30	8	8	14	41	54	−13	32	14	R16	DNQ	NH			18,487	Tianjin Olympic Center Stadium
2019	1	30	12	5	13	43	45	−2	41	7	QF	DNQ	NH			19,037	Tianjin Olympic Center Stadium
2020	1	20	2	5	13	15	35	−20	3	10	SF	DNQ	NH				Suzhou and Dalian
2021	1	22	5	6	11	18	35	-17	21	12	R16	DNQ	NH				Suzhou
2022	1	34	14	7	13	45	42	3	49	8	R3	DNQ	NH				Haikou
2023	1	30	11	15	4	40	29	11	48	8	QF	DNQ	NH			30,395	Tianjin Olympic Center Stadium; TEDA Soccer Stadium

- No league games in 1959, 1966–72, and 1975; Tianjin didn't compete in 1992 Jia B but had kept their spot in the league.
- ^1: In final group stage. ^2: In the group stage. ^3: In the north league. ^4: Deducted 6 points.

Key

	China top division
	China second division
	China third division
W	Winners
RU	Runners-up
3	Third place
	Relegated

- Pld = Played
- W = Games won
- D = Games drawn
- L = Games lost
- F = Goals for
- A = Goals against
- Pts = Points
- Pos = Final position
- DNQ = Did not qualify
- DNE = Did not enter
- NH = Not Held
- – = Does Not Exist
- R1 = Round 1
- R2 = Round 2
- R3 = Round 3
- R4 = Round 4
- F = Final
- SF = Semi-finals
- QF = Quarter-finals
- R16 = Round of 16
- Group = Group stage
- GS2 = Second Group stage
- QR1 = First Qualifying Round
- QR2 = Second Qualifying Round
- QR3 = Third Qualifying Round

=== Continental results ===
Season	Competition	Round	Opposition	Home	Away	Rank /Agg.
2009	AFC Champions League	Group stage	(Japan) Kawasaki Frontale	3–1	0–1	3rd
2009	AFC Champions League	Group stage	(Australia) Central Coast Mariners	2–2	1–0	3rd
2009	AFC Champions League	Group stage	(South Korea) Pohang Steelers	0–0	0–1	3rd
2011	AFC Champions League	Group stage	(South Korea) Jeju United	3–0	1–0	2nd
2011	AFC Champions League	Group stage	(Japan) Gamba Osaka	2–1	0–2	2nd
2011	AFC Champions League	Group stage	(Australia) Melbourne Victory	1–1	1–2	2nd
2011	AFC Champions League	Round of 16	(South Korea) Jeonbuk Hyundai Motors	—N/a	0–3	—N/a
2012	AFC Champions League	Group stage	(Australia) Central Coast Mariners	0–0	1–5	4th
2012	AFC Champions League	Group stage	(South Korea) Seongnam Ilhwa Chunma	0–3	1–1	4th
2012	AFC Champions League	Group stage	(Japan) Nagoya Grampus	0–3	0–0	4th
