= Minyuan Stadium =

Football stadium in Tianjin, China

Coordinates: 39°06′40″N 117°11′56″E

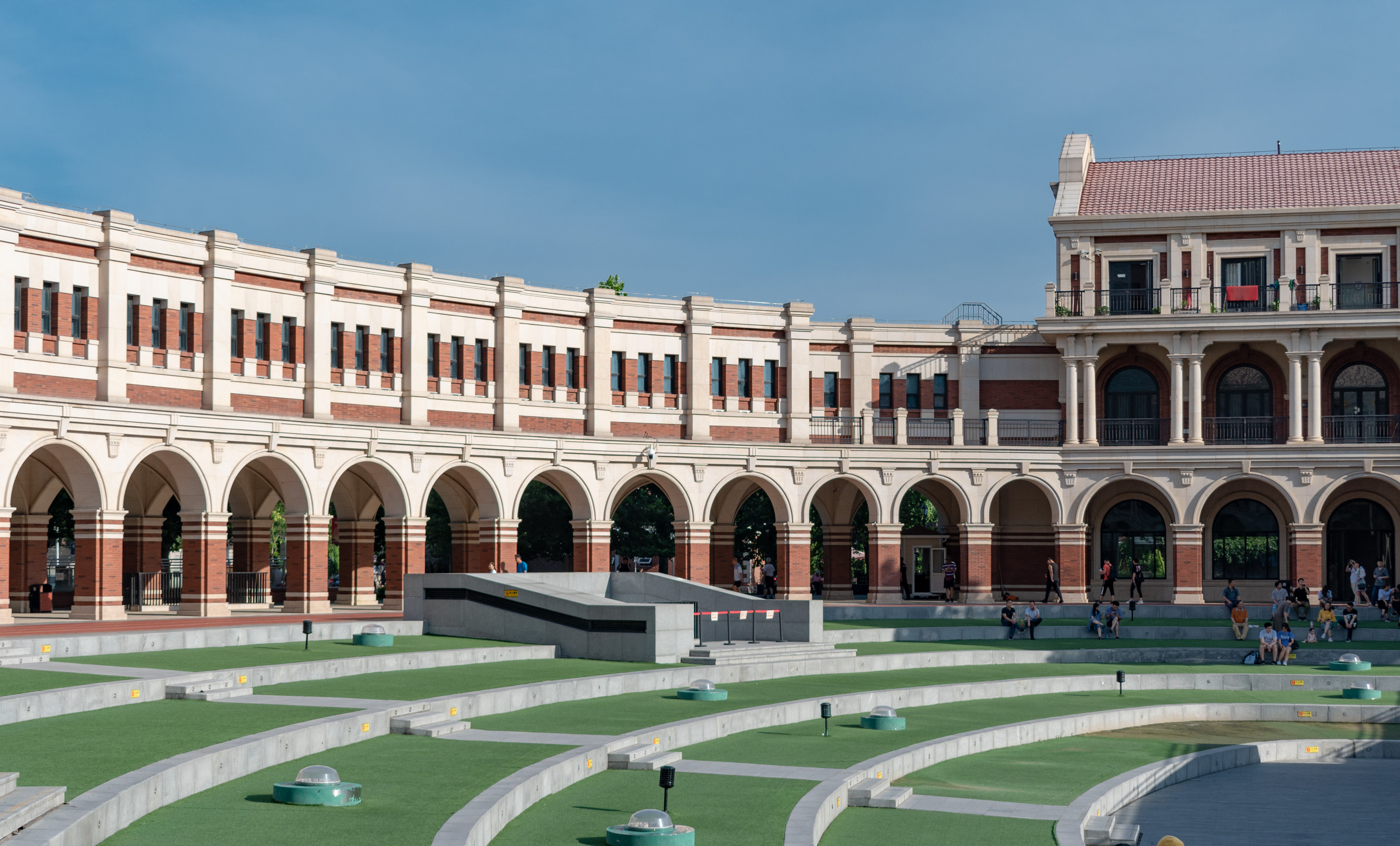
- Interactive map of Minyuan Stadium
- Location: Tianjin, China PR
- Capacity: 18,000

Construction
- Opened: 6 October 1926
- Closed: 23 June 2012

Tenant
- Tianjin TEDA (1994–2004)

Minyuan Stadium, in Tianjin, China, was used mostly for football matches and hosted the home matches of Tianjin Teda F.C. until the TEDA Football Stadium opened in 2004. The stadium held 18,000 spectators. Eric Liddell helped build the stadium when he was a missionary in Tianjin in 1926, modelling it on Stamford Bridge of London, which was Liddell's favourite athletics venue.

Minyuan Stadium was closed and remodelled over a two-year period starting in 2012. It re-opened as a public square in 2014.
