= Con Ouzounidis =

Australian soccer player

Personal information
- Date of birth: 8 October 1999 (age 27)
- Place of birth: Sydney, Australia
- Height: 1.93 m (6 ft 4 in)
- Position: Defender

Team information
- Current team: Esbjerg
- Number: 30

Youth career
- 2015-2017: Sutherland Sharks
- 2017–2021: Everton

Senior career*
Years	Team	Apps	(Gls)
2021–	Esbjerg	30	(2)

International career
2017–2018	Australia U19	4	(0)
2019–2021	Australia U23	2	(0)
- * Club domestic league appearances and goals

Con Ouzounidis (Greek: Κων Ουζουνίδης) (born 8 October 1999) is an Australian soccer player who plays as a defender most recently for Esbjerg, however is currently a free agent.

Ouzounidis was born in Sydney and played youth football with Sutherland Sharks and Everton before making his professional debut with Esbjerg.

== Career ==
As a youth player, Ouzounidis joined the youth academy of English Premier League side Everton. In 2021, he signed for Esbjerg in Denmark.
