= Abdulmumin Zabirov =

Tajikistani professional football player

Abdulmumin Alisherovich Zabirov
Personal information
- Full name: Abdulmumin Alisherovich Zabirov
- Date of birth: 4 August 2001 (age 25)
- Place of birth: Tajikistan
- Position: Midfielder

Team information
- Current team: Khujand
- Number: 9

Senior career*
Years	Team	Apps	(Gls)
2017–2018	Barkchi		
2019	CSKA Pamir Dushanbe	5	(0)
2019	Regar-TadAZ	0	(0)
2020–2021	Khujand		
2022	Eskhata Khujand		
2023–	Khujand		

International career^{‡}
2018	Tajikistan U19		
2020–	Tajikistan	5	(0)
- * Club domestic league appearances and goals as of 10:48, 8 November 2020 (UTC) ‡ National team caps and goals as of 07:01, 25 May 2021 (UTC)

Abdulmumin Zabirov (Russian: Абдулмумин Забиров born 4 August 2001) is a Tajikistani professional football player who currently plays for FK Khujand.

== Career ==
=== Club ===
On 18 February 2020, FK Khujand announced the signing of Zabirov from Regar-TadAZ.

=== International ===
Zabirov made his senior team debut on 7 November 2020 against Bahrain.

== Career statistics ==
=== International ===
Tajikistan national team
Year	Apps	Goals
2020	1	0
2021	4	0
Total	5	0

Statistics accurate as of match played 24 May 2021
