= Nguyễn Cảnh Anh =

Vietnamese footballer (born 2000)

Personal information
- Birth name: Nguyễn Cảnh Anh
- Date of birth: 12 January 2000 (age 26)
- Place of birth: Tân Kỳ, Nghệ An, Vietnam
- Height: 1.80 m (5 ft 11 in)
- Position: Center back

Team information
- Current team: Đồng Tháp
- Number: 6

Youth career
- 2011–2012: Viettel
- 2013–2019: Hoàng Anh Gia Lai

Senior career*
Years	Team	Apps	(Gls)
2019–	Hoàng Anh Gia Lai	1	(0)
2019	→ Bình Định (loan)	12	(2)
2020	→ Đồng Tháp (loan)	7	(1)
2021	→ Công An Nhân Dân (loan)	4	(0)
2022	→ Hải Phòng (loan)	1	(0)
2023	→ Cheonan City (loan)	0	(0)
2024	→ LPBank Ho Chi Minh City (loan)		
2025	→ Long An (loan)	9	(0)
2025–	→ Đồng Tháp (loan)	4	(0)

International career
2017–2018	Vietnam U19	4	(0)
- * Club domestic league appearances and goals as of 6 June 2026

Nguyễn Cảnh Anh (born 12 January 2000) is a Vietnamese professional footballer who plays as a centre back for V.League 2 club Đồng Tháp, on loan from Hoàng Anh Gia Lai.

== Early career ==
Born in Nghệ An, Cảnh Anh started playing football at a young age, representing Tân Kỳ district in local and national junior competitions. In 2011, he was recruited to the Viettel youth academy but he quit the team in the following year. In 2013, he was admitted to the Hoàng Anh Gia Lai Academy after a youth trial.

== Club career ==
In 2019, Cảnh Anh was loaned to V.League 2 side Bình Định and made his professional debut in the 2019 V.League 2.

In September 2020, Cảnh Anh joined V.League 2 team Đồng Tháp on a six-months loan deal. He appeared in 7 games in the second half of the season and scored a goal, but failed to save his team from relegation.

In March 2021, Cảnh Anh remained V.League 2, joining Công An Nhân Dân on loan.

In January 2022, Cảnh Anh signed for V.League 1 team Hải Phòng. He only made one appearance for the club during the 2022 season.

On 31 January 2023, Cảnh Anh joined K League 2 side Cheonan City on loan but didn't appear in any match.

In March 2024, Cảnh Anh was loaned to Vietnamese third tier club LPBank Ho Chi Minh City.

== International career ==
Cảnh Anh took part in the 2018 AFC U-19 Championship with Vietnam under-19s.
