= New Taipei Municipal Hsinchuang Senior High School =

High school in Xinzhuang, New Taipei, Taiwan

New Taipei Municipal Hsinchuang High School

Location
- No.135, Zhongping Rd., Xinzhuang Dist., New Taipei City 242, Taiwan (R.O.C.)

Information
- Other name: 新北市立新莊高級中學
- Type: New Taipei City senior high school
- Established: 1992
- School district: New Taipei City Hsinchuang District (Chinese: 新莊區)
- Principal: Mrs. Yi-Jun, Chen (陳怡君)
- Website: http://www.hcsh.ntpc.edu.tw/

New Taipei Municipal Hsinchuang Senior High School is a high school in the Xinzhuang District of New Taipei, Taiwan. It was founded in 1992.

== History ==
The Taiwan Provincial Government founded the preparatory department of the school on October 18, 1990 and it was officially established and named “Taiwan Provincial Xinchuang Senior High School” on July 1, 1992.

This school was the first public senior high school in Xinzhuang District to be equipped with the co-ed system and experimental art class. In the first year of the foundation, the school borrowed space from Xintai Elementary School nearby for teaching, and also recruited six new classes. With the school returning to where the school is currently located on August 1, 1993, the number of the classes increased to fifteen. In 1994, there were twenty-five classes and thirty-six in 1995. In 1997, the number of classes amounted to fifty-one. Currently, there are fifty-seven classes in total, including three art classes.

The school was nationalized and renamed “National Xinchuang Senior High School” as of February 1, 2000.

== Campus ==
The school covers an area of 3.7 hectares. The school buildings encompass an administrative building, general classrooms, a sciences teaching building, home-economic classrooms, computer labs, a teaching building, playgrounds, basketball and volleyball courts and track and field, school gardens, library, and a student activity center.

It neighbors Xinzhuang Culture and Arts Center.
