= Li Sirong =

Chinese footballer (born 2003)

Sam Li
Personal information
- Full name: Li Sirong
- Date of birth: 4 May 2003 (age 23)
- Place of birth: Dalian, Liaoning, China
- Height: 1.78 m (5 ft 10 in)
- Position: Right-back

Team information
- Current team: Qingdao Hainiu
- Number: 39

Youth career
- 2016–2023: ADO Den Haag

Senior career*
Years	Team	Apps	(Gls)
2023	ADO Den Haag	0	(0)
2023	→ Vejle (loan)	1	(0)
2023	Vejle	0	(0)
2023–2024	Dubrava	8	(0)
2024–2025	Orijent	16	(0)
2025–	Tianjin Jinmen Tiger	2	(1)
2026–	→ Qingdao Hainiu (loan)	0	(0)
- * Club domestic league appearances and goals as of 3:44, 21 August 2026 (UTC)

Li Sirong (Chinese: 李嗣镕; born 4 May 2003), sometimes known in Europe as Sam Li, is a Chinese footballer who plays as a right-back for Chinese Super League club Qingdao Hainiu, on loan from Tianjin Jinmen Tiger.

== Club career ==
Born in Dalian, Liaoning, Li started playing football at the age of eight. His mother took him to Spain, Germany, and France, before deciding that the Netherlands would be the best place for her son to pursue a career in football. He moved to the Netherlands at the age of twelve, training with an amateur side for over a year before passing a trial with professional side ADO Den Haag.

In February 2020, he suffered a serious injury to his knee, keeping him out for almost a year. Despite this, he recovered to sign his first professional contract with ADO Den Haag in January 2021, a three-and-a-half-year deal.

In January 2023, he was loaned to Danish side Vejle. He made his debut for Vejle in June 2023 and at the end of the season, the Li made a permanent move to Vejle. On 13 September 2023, Vejle confirmed that Li had been sold to an unnamed Croatian club. The club was later revealed as NK Dubrava.

In July 2025, Li returned to China and joined Chinese Super League club Tianjin Jinmen Tiger.

== Personal life ==
Li is the son of former Chinese international footballer, and current general manager of Beijing Guoan, Li Ming.

As well as professional football, Li also works as a model, and has worked with French personal care brand L'Oréal. He has also modelled Italian fashion house Bottega Veneta and German brand Puma clothing, both for American men's magazine GQ.

== Career statistics ==
=== Club ===
As of 7 January 2024.

Appearances and goals by club, season and competition
Club	Season	League			Cup		Continental		Other		Total	
Club	Season	Division	Apps	Goals	Apps	Goals	Apps	Goals	Apps	Goals	Apps	Goals
ADO Den Haag	2022–23	Eerste Divisie	0	0	0	0	–		0	0	0	0
Vejle (loan)	2022–23	Danish 1st Division	1	0	0	0	–		0	0	1	0
Vejle	2023–24	Danish Superliga	0	0	0	0	–		0	0	0	0
Dubrava	2023–24	Prva NL	1	0	2 (Note: Appearances in the Croatian Cup)	0	–		0	0	3	0
Career total			2	0	0	0	0	0	0	0	2	0

== Honours ==
Vejle

- Danish 1st Division: 2022–23
