= Abdulrahman Saleh (footballer, born 1999) =

Emirati footballer (born 1999)

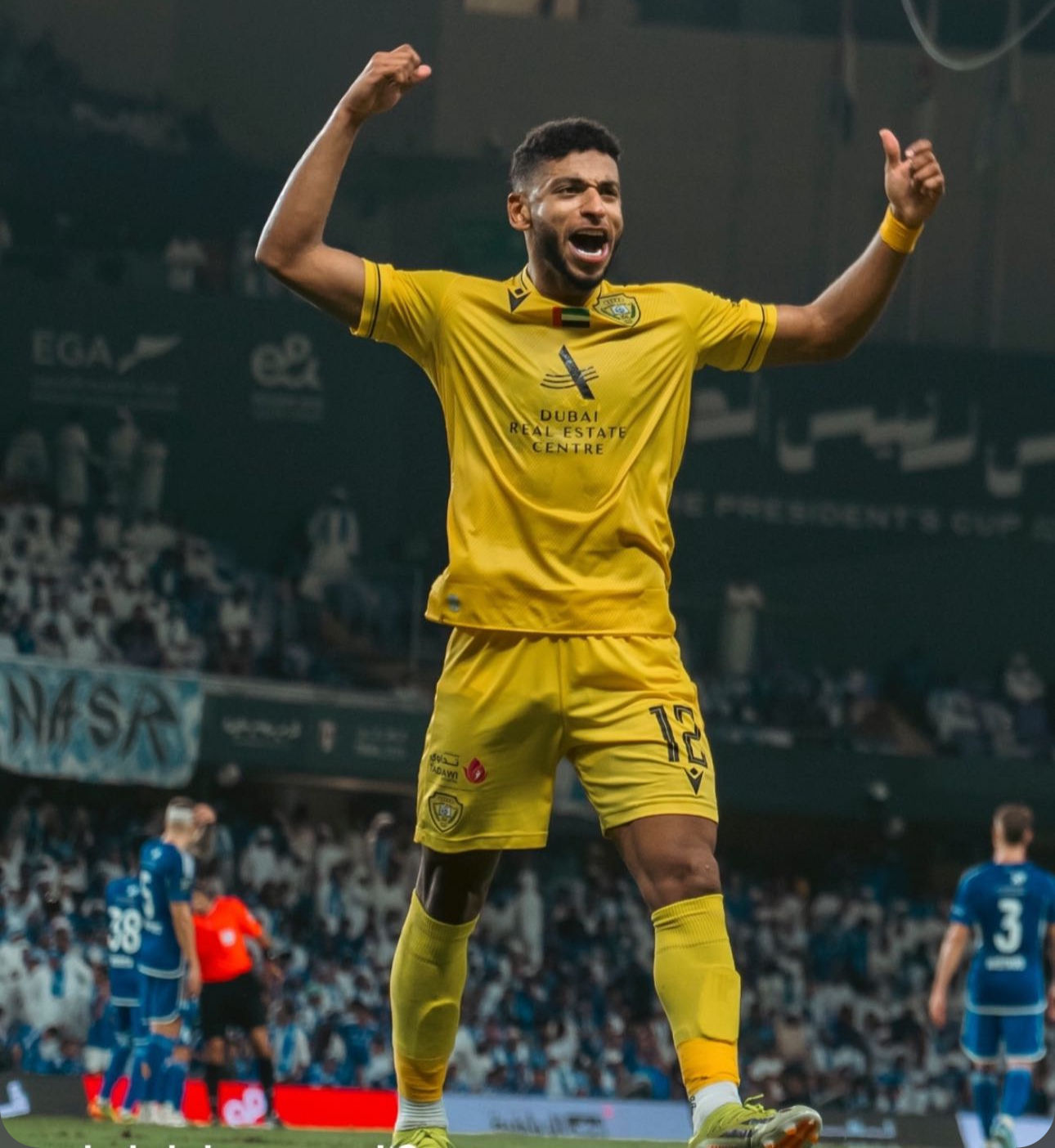
- Saleh with Al-Wasl in 2024

Personal information
- Full name: Abdelrahman Saleh Radi Rida Khamis
- Date of birth: 3 June 1999 (age 27)
- Place of birth: Dubai, United Arab Emirates
- Height: 1.73 m (5 ft 8 in)
- Position: Left-back

Team information
- Current team: Al-Wasl
- Number: 12

Youth career
- -2018: Al Wasl

Senior career*
Years	Team	Apps	(Gls)
2018–	Al Wasl	98	(2)

International career^{‡}
2018	United Arab Emirates U19	2	(0)
2023–	United Arab Emirates	2	(0)
- * Club domestic league appearances and goals as of 14:24, 2 January 2024 (UTC) ‡ National team caps and goals as of 14:24, 2 January 2024 (UTC)

Abdelrahman Saleh Khamis (Arabic: عَبْد الرَّحْمٰن صَالِح رَاضِي رِضَا خَمِيس; born 3 June 1999) is an Emirati professional footballer who plays as a left back for Al-Wasl and the United Arab Emirates national football team.

== International career ==
On 4 January 2024, Saleh was named in the UAE's squad for the 2023 AFC Asian Cup.
