= Yan Bingliang (footballer) =

Chinese association football player

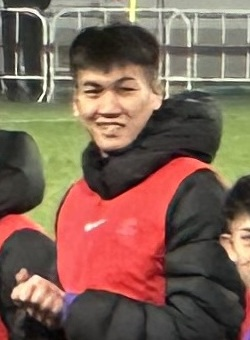
- Yan Bingliang in April 2025

Personal information
- Date of birth: 3 April 2000 (age 26)
- Place of birth: Dunhua, Jilin, China
- Height: 1.97 m (6 ft 6 in)
- Position: Goalkeeper

Team information
- Current team: Tianjin Jinmen Tiger
- Number: 25

Youth career
- Dali Ruilong
- 2013–2015: Villarreal
- 2016–2017: Atlético Madrid
- 2018: Shandong Luneng Taishan
- 2018–2019: Villarreal

Senior career*
Years	Team	Apps	(Gls)
2019–2020	CD Roda	0	(0)
2022–	Tianjin Jinmen Tiger	51	(0)

International career^{‡}
2026–	China	1	(0)
- * Club domestic league appearances and goals as of 22 November 2026 ‡ National team caps and goals as of 2 October 2026

Yan Bingliang (Chinese: 闫炳良; born 3 April 2000) is a Chinese professional footballer who plays as a goalkeeper for Chinese Super League club Tianjin Jinmen Tiger and the China national team.

== Club career ==
=== Youth ===
Yan was invited to join the academy of Villarreal in 2013 from Dali Ruilong, as part of the Wanda Group initiative to bring young Chinese players to Spanish clubs. While in Spain, he also played for the academy of Atlético Madrid.

Yan returned briefly to China, helping Shandong Luneng Taishan win the Weifang Cup in 2018. By the end of 2018, he was back with Villarreal.

=== CD Roda ===
In July 2019, Yan signed his first professional contract with fourth tier Tercera División side, CD Roda.

=== Tianjin Jinmen Tiger ===
In April 2022, Yan signed with Chinese Super League side Tianjin Jinmen Tiger. He would make his debut in a league game on 7 November 2022 against Hebei F.C. in a 5–0 victory.

== International career ==
On 24 September 2026, Yan made his debut for the senior China national team in a friendly against the Maldives.

== Career statistics ==
As of 22 November 2026.

Appearances and goals by club, season and competition
Club	Season	League			Cup		Continental		Other		Total	
Club	Season	Division	Apps	Goals	Apps	Goals	Apps	Goals	Apps	Goals	Apps	Goals
CD Roda	2019–20	Tercera División	0	0	0	0	–		–		0	0
Tianjin Jinmen Tiger	2022	Chinese Super League	1	0	1	0	–		–		2	0
Tianjin Jinmen Tiger	2023	Chinese Super League	1	0	1	0	–		–		2	0
Tianjin Jinmen Tiger	2024	Chinese Super League	1	0	3	0	–		–		4	0
Tianjin Jinmen Tiger	2025	Chinese Super League	21	0	1	0	–		–		22	0
Tianjin Jinmen Tiger	2026	Chinese Super League	27	0	0	0	–		–		27	0
Tianjin Jinmen Tiger	Total		51	0	6	0	0	0	0	0	57	0
Career total			51	0	6	0	0	0	0	0	57	0
