= Eisa Palangi =

Qatari footballer (born 1999)

Personal information
- Full name: Eisa Ahmad Palangi
- Date of birth: 21 February 1999 (age 27)
- Place of birth: Asaluyeh, Iran
- Height: 1.77 m (5 ft 10 in)
- Positions: Winger; left back

Team information
- Current team: Qatar
- Number: 20

Senior career*
Years	Team	Apps	(Gls)
2018–	Qatar	124	(3)

International career^{‡}
2018	Qatar U19	4	(0)
2018	Qatar U20	2	(0)
2021	Qatar U23	6	(0)
- * Club domestic league appearances and goals as of 3 September 2026 ‡ National team caps and goals as of 11 June 2021

Eisa Palangi (born 21 February 1999) is a professional footballer who plays as a winger or a left back for Qatar. Born in Iran, he has represented Qatar at youth level.
