= Suhail Abdulla =

Emirati association football player (born 1999)

Suhail Abdulla سهيل عبد الله
Personal information
- Full name: Suhail Abdulla Ibrahim Al-Mutawaa
- Date of birth: 26 August 1999 (age 27)
- Place of birth: Emirates
- Height: 1.83 m (6 ft 0 in)
- Position: Goalkeeper

Team information
- Current team: Al-Wasl
- Number: 17

Youth career
- –2018: Al-Wasl

Senior career*
Years	Team	Apps	(Gls)
2018–	Al-Wasl	1	(0)
2021–2022	→ Emirates (loan)	13	(0)
2023–2024	→ Emirates (loan)	22	(0)
2024–2025	→ Dibba Al-Hisn (loan)	21	(0)
- * Club domestic league appearances and goals

Suhail Abdulla (Arabic:سهيل عبد الله) (born 26 August 1999) is an Emirati footballer. He currently plays as a goalkeeper for Al-Wasl.

== Career ==
Suhail Abdulla started his career at Al-Wasl and is a product of the Al-Wasl's youth system. On 15 May 2015, he made his professional debut for Al-Wasl against Al-Ain in the Pro League.
