= Wang Xianjun =

Chinese association football player

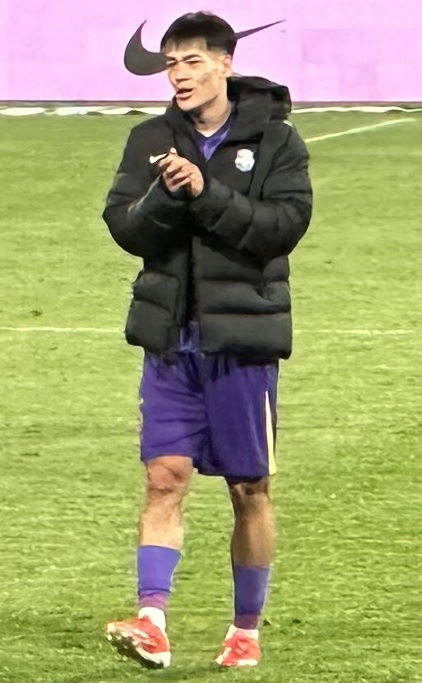
- Wang Xianjun in April 2025

Personal information
- Date of birth: 1 June 2000 (age 26)
- Place of birth: Dalian, Liaoning, China
- Height: 1.85 m (6 ft 1 in)
- Positions: Centre-back; left-back

Team information
- Current team: Tianjin Jinmen Tiger
- Number: 6

Youth career
- –2020: Dalian Pro

Senior career*
Years	Team	Apps	(Gls)
2020–2023	Dalian Pro	37	(0)
2024–	Tianjin Jinmen Tiger	64	(1)

International career^{‡}
2018	China U19	1	(0)
- * Club domestic league appearances and goals as of 22 November 2026 ‡ National team caps and goals as of 14:01, 31 December 2020 (UTC)

Wang Xianjun (Chinese: 王献钧; born 1 June 2000) is a Chinese professional footballer who plays as a centre-back or left-back for Tianjin Jinmen Tiger.

== Club career ==
Wang Xianjun was promoted to the senior team of Dalian Professional within the 2020 Chinese Super League season and would make his debut in a Chinese FA Cup game on 18 September 2020 against Shandong Luneng Taishan F.C. in a 4-0 defeat. He would go on to make his debut in a league game on 27 September 2020 against Guangzhou Evergrande Taobao, where he came on as a substitute in a match that ended in a 1-0 defeat.

== Career statistics ==
As of 27 May 2026.

Club	Season	League			Cup		Continental		Other		Total	
Club	Season	Division	Apps	Goals	Apps	Goals	Apps	Goals	Apps	Goals	Apps	Goals
Dalian Pro	2020	Chinese Super League	1	0	1	0	–		–		2	0
Dalian Pro	2021	Chinese Super League	5	0	3	0	–		0 (Note: Appearance(s) in Promotion/Relegation Play-offs)	0	8	0
Dalian Pro	2022	Chinese Super League	15	0	1	0	–		–		16	0
Dalian Pro	2023	Chinese Super League	16	0	2	0	–		–		18	0
Dalian Pro	Total		37	0	7	0	0	0	0	0	44	0
Tianjin Jinmen Tiger	2024	Chinese Super League	15	0	3	0	–		–		18	0
Tianjin Jinmen Tiger	2025	Chinese Super League	24	0	2	0	–		–		26	0
Tianjin Jinmen Tiger	2026	Chinese Super League	12	1	0	0	–		–		12	1
Tianjin Jinmen Tiger	Total		51	1	5	0	0	0	0	0	56	1
Career total			88	1	12	0	0	0	0	0	100	1
