= Marwan Badreldin =

Qatari footballer (born 1999)

Personal information
- Full name: Marwan Sherif Badreldin
- Date of birth: 17 April 1999 (age 27)
- Place of birth: Qatar
- Position: Goalkeeper

Team information
- Current team: Al Ahli
- Number: 35

Senior career*
Years	Team	Apps	(Gls)
2018–	Al Ahli	43	(0)
2020	→ Al-Rayyan (loan)	0	(0)
2020–2021	→ Al-Shahania (loan)	-	(-)
2021–2022	→ Al-Shamal (loan)	17	(0)

International career^{‡}
2018–	Qatar U20	2	(0)
2018–	Qatar U23	3	(0)
- * Club domestic league appearances and goals as of 17 January 2026 ‡ National team caps and goals as of 20:26, 20 August 2018 (UTC)

Marwan Sherif Badreldin (Arabic: مَرْوَان شَرِيف بَدْر الدِّين; born 17 April 1999) is a Qatari footballer who plays as a goalkeeper for Al Ahli Doha.

== Career statistics ==
=== Club ===
As of 26 May 2018.

Club	Season	League			Cup		Continental		Other		Total	
Club	Season	Division	Apps	Goals	Apps	Goals	Apps	Goals	Apps	Goals	Apps	Goals
Al Ahli	2017–18	Qatar Stars League	1	0	0	0	–		0	0	1	0
Career total			1	0	0	0	0	0	0	0	1	0
