= Qi Yuxi =

Chinese footballer (born 2000)

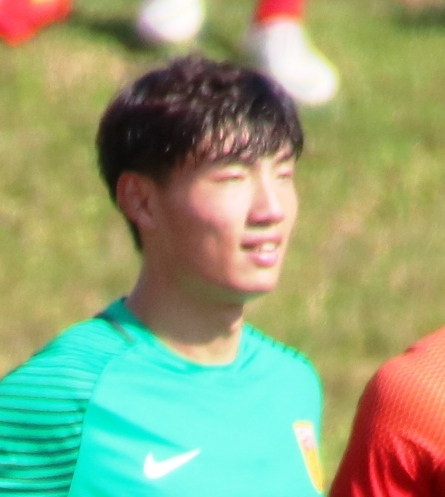
- Qi Yuxi in 2018

Personal information
- Date of birth: 21 November 2000 (age 26)
- Place of birth: Xuzhou, Jiangsu, China
- Height: 1.87 m (6 ft 2 in)
- Position: Goalkeeper

Team information
- Current team: Tianjin Jinmen Tiger
- Number: 21

Youth career
- –2019: Jiangsu Suning

Senior career*
Years	Team	Apps	(Gls)
2019–2020	Jiangsu Suning	0	(0)
2021–2022	Heilongjiang Ice City	17	(0)
2023–2025	Nanjing City	53	(0)
2026–	Tianjin Jinmen Tiger	4	(0)

International career
2016	China U17	3	(0)
2017–2019	China U19	6	(0)
- * Club domestic league appearances and goals as of 22 November 2026

Qi Yuxi (Chinese: 齐雨熙; born 21 November 2000) is a Chinese footballer currently playing as a goalkeeper for Tianjin Jinmen Tiger.

== Club career ==
=== Heilongjiang Ice City ===
Having begun his career in the academy of Jiangsu Suning, Qi was named on the bench on a handful of occasions in the 2019 and 2020 seasons, but would not debut for the club. On the dissolution of Jiangsu in early 2021, he joined China League One club Heilongjiang Ice City. At Ice City he studied under the tutelage of Li Wei, a former goalkeeper-turned-coach, who had been responsible for the development of China League One Golden Glove winners Mu Pengfei and Xu Jiamin. On his arrival at the club, Li stated that Qi would have to compete with current goalkeeper Lu Ning, who was named in the 2020 China League One Team of the Season, for a spot in the team.

Qi's debut would come in the second round of the 2021 season, as Ice City lost 4–0 to eventual league champions Wuhan Three Towns on 30 April 2021. He would go on to make a further sixteen league appearances, keeping clean sheets in seven games, with Qi credited for good performances. On 12 September 2021 he was shown a yellow card for unsporting behaviour in a 1–0 win against Kunshan FC by referee Jia Zhiliang; after making a routine save, Qi fell to the ground complaining of an injury, taking off his boots and gloves in an attempt to waste time.

On 13 April 2022, Qi filed an arbitration application with the Chinese Football Association (CFA), claiming that Ice City had failed to pay him eight months worth of wages, and under FIFA's rulings, this entitled him to leave the club on a free transfer, similar to the Bosman ruling. However, Ice City argued that they had been informed of the unpaid wages by Qi on 3 April, and had paid him within the grace period, specifically on 22 April. Having failed to reach an agreement between the three parties before the transfer deadline day on 29 April, Qi was forced to remain with Ice City for the remainder of the 2022 season, being relegated to the club's reserve team. It was reported that, had the CFA forced Ice City to allow Qi to leave on a free transfer, the club would have withdrawn from the Chinese football league system.

=== Nanjing City ===
After a season without playing professional football, Qi left Ice City to join fellow-China League One club Nanjing City ahead of the 2023 season. He established himself in the first team in his first season, crediting goalkeeping coach Li Rui, whom he had worked with at Jiangsu, for his help in training after a year out. In a 2–1 Chinese FA Cup loss to Chengdu Rongcheng on 21 August 2024, Qi saved a penalty from Chengdu forward Wei Shihao, drawing national attention. In a 2–1 China League One win against Guangzhou FC, Qi was shown a yellow card for a foul on Guangzhou's Lithuanian defender Rimvydas Sadauskas in the centre-circle, with many believing he should have instead been shown a red card for denying a goal-scoring opportunity. On 27 January 2026, the club announced his departure after the 2025 season.

=== Tianjin Jinmen Tiger ===
On 13 February 2026, Qi joined Chinese Super League club Tianjin Jinmen Tiger.

== International career ==
Qi was called up to the China national under-23 football team in June 2021 ahead of preparation for the 2022 Asian Games and the 2022 AFC U-23 Asian Cup. He was called up again for the Dubai Cup in 2022.

== Career statistics ==
=== Club ===
As of 19 June 2025.

Appearances and goals by club, season and competition
Club	Season	League			Cup (Note: Includes Chinese FA Cup)		Other		Total	
Club	Season	Division	Apps	Goals	Apps	Goals	Apps	Goals	Apps	Goals
Jiangsu Suning	2019	Chinese Super League	0	0	0	0	0	0	0	0
Jiangsu Suning	2020	Chinese Super League	0	0	0	0	0	0	0	0
Jiangsu Suning	Total		0	0	0	0	0	0	0	0
Heilongjiang Ice City	2021	China League One	17	0	1	0	0	0	18	0
Heilongjiang Ice City	2022	China League One	0	0	0	0	0	0	0	0
Heilongjiang Ice City	Total		17	0	1	0	0	0	18	0
Nanjing City	2023	China League One	12	0	2	0	0	0	14	0
Nanjing City	2024	China League One	25	0	3	0	0	0	28	0
Nanjing City	2025	China League One	1	0	1	0	0	0	2	0
Nanjing City	Total		38	0	6	0	0	0	44	0
Career total			55	0	7	0	0	0	62	0
