= 2026–27 Dewa United Banten F.C. season =

Indonesian football club season

Dewa United Banten F.C.
2026–27 season
- President: Tommy Hermawan Lo
- Coach: (Brazil) Osmar Loss
- Stadium: Banten International Stadium
| Home colours | Away colours | Third colours |

The 2026–27 season is Dewa United's 5th consecutive season in top-flight following its success in promoted from the 2021–22 Liga 2. This is Dewa United's first season under Brazilian coach Osmar Loss, who replaced the previous coach, Jan Olde Riekerink.

== Squad ==
As of September 2026

| No. | Player | Nationality | Date of birth (age) | Previous club | Notes |
Goalkeepers
| 1 | Muhammad Riyandi | (Indonesia) | 3 January 2000 (age 26) | (Indonesia) Persis Solo | |
| 20 | Fais Iqbal | (Indonesia) | 14 March 2007 (age 19) | (Indonesia) Dewa United U20 | |
| 92 | Sonny Stevens | (Netherlands) | 22 June 1992 (age 34) | (Greece) OFI Crete F.C. | |
Defenders
| 2 | Nick Kuipers | (Netherlands) | 8 October 1992 (age 34) | (Indonesia) Persib Bandung | |
| 4 | Johnathan Pereira | (Brazil) | 4 April 1995 (age 31) | (Bulgaria) CSKA Sofia II | |
| 14 | Brian Fatari | (Indonesia) | 20 December 1999 (age 26) | (Indonesia) Persipura Jayapura | |
| 17 | Damion Lowe | (Jamaica) | 5 May 1993 (age 33) | (United States) Houston Dynamo | |
| 22 | Ko Myeong-seok | (South Korea) | 27 September 1995 (age 31) | (Thailand) Buriram | |
| 23 | Ady Setiawan | (Indonesia) | 10 September 1994 (age 32) | (Indonesia) RANS Nusantara | |
| 25 | Alfharezzi Buffon | (Indonesia) | 28 April 2006 (age 20) | (Indonesia) Garudayaksa F.C. | On loan from Garudayaksa F.C. |
| 30 | Surya Yudha | (Indonesia) | 22 April 2008 (age 18) | (Indonesia) Dewa United U20 | |
| 37 | Altalariq Ballah | (Indonesia) | 30 December 2000 (age 25) | (Indonesia) Persebaya Surabaya | |
| 50 | Jagat Gumelar | (Indonesia) | 11 April 2007 (age 19) | (Indonesia) Dewa United U20 | |
| 97 | Edo Febriansah | (Indonesia) | 25 July 1997 (age 29) | (Indonesia) Persib Bandung | |
Midfielders
| 5 | Jean Mangabeira | (Brazil) | 10 March 1997 (age 29) | (Brazil) Figueirense FC | |
| 6 | Ivar Jenner | (Indonesia) | 10 January 2004 (age 22) | (Netherlands) FC Utrecht | |
| 11 | Taisei Marukawa | (Japan) | 30 January 1997 (age 29) | (Indonesia) PSIS Semarang | |
| 15 | Rangga Muslim | (Indonesia) | 3 May 1994 (age 32) | (Indonesia) Bhayangkara Presisi | |
| 19 | Ricky Kambuaya | (Indonesia) | 5 May 1996 (age 30) | (Indonesia) Persib Bandung | |
| 26 | Farhan Saviola | (Indonesia) | 5 May 2006 (age 20) | (Indonesia) Dewa United U20 | |
| 28 | Alexis Messidoro | (Argentina) | 13 May 1997 (age 29) | (Indonesia) Persis Solo | |
| 38 | Fajar Pratama | (Indonesia) | 31 May 2007 (age 19) | (Indonesia) Dewa United U20 | |
| 63 | Ripal Wahyudi | (Indonesia) | 10 October 2000 (age 26) | (Indonesia) Semen Padang | |
| 79 | Kafiatur Rizky | (Indonesia) | 17 July 2006 (age 20) | (Indonesia) Borneo Samarinda | |
| 88 | Lotra Widiyanto | (Indonesia) | 26 April 2006 (age 20) | (Indonesia) Dewa United U20 | |
Forwards
| 7 | Denílson Jr. | (Brazil) | 18 July 1995 (age 31) | (Thailand) Ratchaburi F.C. | |
| 9 | Pedro Augusto | (Brazil) | 26 March 1999 (age 27) | (Bolivia) Guabirá | |
| 10 | Egy Maulana Vikri | (Indonesia) | 7 July 2000 (age 26) | (Slovakia) ViOn Zlaté Moravce | |
| 27 | Rafael Struick | (Indonesia) | 27 March 2003 (age 23) | (Australia) Brisbane Roar | |
| 77 | Noah Sadaoui | (Morocco) | 14 September 1993 (age 33) | (India) Kerala Blasters | |
| 90 | Nofalio Ardanan | (Indonesia) | 15 January 2007 (age 19) | (Indonesia) Dewa United U20 | |

== Coaching staff ==
| Position | Name |
|---|---|
| Team manager | (Indonesia) Judo Iswantoro |
| Head coach | (Brazil) Osmar Loss |
| Assistant coach | (Brazil) Rafael Goncalves |
| Assistant coach | (Indonesia) Bayu Eka Sari |
| Assistant coach | (Indonesia) Firman Utina |
| Goalkeeper coach | (Netherlands) Frank Kooiman |
| Physical coach | (Brazil) Marcio Faria Correa |
| Assistant physical coach | (Indonesia) Hendra Pratama |
| Video Analyst | (Brazil) Uendell Macedo Silva |
| Video Analyst | (Indonesia) Arya Luthfy |

== Transfers ==
=== In ===
| Date | Position | Player | From | Fee | Ref |
Pre-Season
| 29 July 2026 | DF | (South Korea) Ko Myeong-seok | (Thailand) Buriram | | |
| 1 August 2026 | GK | (Indonesia) Muhammad Riyandi | (Indonesia) Persis Solo | | |
| 4 August 2026 | FW | (Brazil) Carlos Iury | (Thailand) Chiangrai United | | |
| 6 August 2026 | FW | (Brazil) Denílson Jr. | (Thailand) Ratchaburi F.C. | | |
| 9 August 2026 | MF | (Indonesia) Ripal Wahyudi | (Indonesia) Semen Padang | | |
| 15 August 2026 | MF | (Brazil) Jean Mangabeira | (Brazil) Figueirense FC | | |

=== Loaned In ===
| Date | Position | No | Player | From | Until | Ref |
Pre-Season
| 27 August 2026 | DF | 25 | (Indonesia) Alfharezzi Buffon | (Indonesia) Garudayaksa F.C. | End of season | |
Mid-Season

=== Out ===
| Date | Position | Player | To | Fee | Ref |
Pre-Season
| 4 July 2026 | GK | (Indonesia) Deden Natshir | (Indonesia) PSMS Medan | | |
| 4 July 2026 | MF | (Indonesia) Rangga Muslim | (Indonesia) PSMS Medan | | |
| 7 July 2026 | FW | (Indonesia) Stefano Lilipaly | (Indonesia) Borneo Samarinda | End of loan | |
| 7 July 2026 | DF | (Indonesia) Rizdjar Nurviat | (Indonesia) Borneo Samarinda | End of loan | |
| 7 July 2026 | DF | (Japan) Kodai Tanaka | (Indonesia) Persis Solo | End of loan | |

=== Loaned Out ===
| Date | Position | No | Player | To | Until | Ref |
Pre-Season
| 25 September 2026 | DF | 70 | (Brazil) Carlos Iury | (Indonesia) Garudayaksa F.C. | End of season | |
Mid-Season

== Pre-season ==
=== Friendly matches ===
Win Draw Loss

| 3 August 2026 1 | Dewa United | 1–3 | Persis Solo | Tangerang |
| 15:30 UTC+7 | | | | Stadium: Dewa United Arena; Attendance: 0 |

| 27 August 2026 2 | Dewa United | 4–0 | Brisbane Roar | Serang |
| 15:30 UTC+7 | | | | Stadium: Banten International Stadium; Attendance: 0 |

== Competitions ==
=== Overview ===
| Competition | First match | Last match | Starting round | Record | | | | | | | |
| Competition | First match | Last match | Starting round | Pld | W | D | L | GF | GA | GD | Win % |
|---|---|---|---|---|---|---|---|---|---|---|---|
| Indonesia Super League | 5 September 2026 | | Matchday 1 | 9 | 6 | 2 | 1 | 16 | 12 | +4 | 66.67 |
| Indonesia League Cup | 3 November 2026 | | Group stage | 1 | 1 | 0 | 0 | 3 | 1 | +2 | 100.00 |
| Total | | | | 10 | 7 | 2 | 1 | 19 | 13 | +6 | 70.00 |

Last updated: 6 November 2026
Source: Competitions

=== League table ===
| Pos | Team | Pld | W | D | L | GF | GA | GD | Pts | Qualification or relegation |
|---|---|---|---|---|---|---|---|---|---|---|
| 1 | Persija | 9 | 7 | 0 | 2 | 19 | 8 | +11 | 21 | Qualification for the 2027–28 AFC Champions League Two group stage |
| 2 | Dewa United Banten | 9 | 6 | 2 | 1 | 16 | 12 | +4 | 20 | Qualification for the 2027–28 AFC Champions League Two play-offs |
| 3 | Bali United | 9 | 6 | 1 | 2 | 26 | 9 | +17 | 19 | |
| 4 | Madura United | 9 | 6 | 1 | 2 | 16 | 10 | +6 | 19 | |
| 5 | Persib | 9 | 5 | 1 | 3 | 16 | 10 | +6 | 16 | |

Updated to match(es) played on 8 November 2026. Source: Super League 2026–27
Rules for classification: 1) Points; 2) Head-to-head points; 3) Head-to-head goal difference; 4) Head-to-head goals scored; 5) Goal difference; 6) Goals scored; 7) Fair-play points; 8) Draw.

=== Matches ===
Win Draw Loss

| 05 September 2026 1 | Persik Kediri | 0–1 | Dewa United | Kediri |
| 15:30 UTC+7 | Enrique (yellow card) 90+3' | Summary; Report | Struick 15'; Ady (yellow card) 69'; Jenner (yellow card) 78' | Stadium: Brawijaya Stadium; Attendance: 5,662; Referee: Candra |

| 11 September 2026 2 | Dewa United | 2–2 | Bhayangkara Presisi | Serang |
| 19:00 UTC+7 | Denílson Jr. 33' 86'; Kuipers (yellow card) 45+3'; Alta (yellow card) 57'; Jenner (yellow card) 86' | Summary; Report | Ristovski 29'; Jefferson 45+4'; Putu Gede (yellow card) 59'; Allano (yellow card) 88' | Stadium: Banten International Stadium; Attendance: 987; Referee: Yoko Suprianto |

| 16 September 2026 3 | Borneo Samarinda | 1–3 | Dewa United | Samarinda |
| 15:30 UTC+7 | Ikhsan 49'; Oliveira (yellow card) 80'; Kadú (yellow card) 89' | Summmary; Report | Denílson Jr. 3' 90+1' (pen.) (yellow card) 55'; Johnathan 14'; Mangabeira (yellow card) 81' | Stadium: Segiri Stadium |

| 20 September 2026 4 | Dewa United | 2–1 | PSS Sleman | Serang |
| 15:30 UTC+7 | Lowe (yellow card) 27'; Struick (yellow card) 40'; Marukawa 49'; Iury 57' | Summmary; Report | Fornazari (yellow card) 27'; Nduwarugira 72'; Lorenzen (yellow card) 90'; Riko (yellow card) 90+4' | Stadium: Banten International Stadium; Attendance: 1,494; Referee: Aprisman Aranda |

| 11 October 2026 5 | Persib Bandung | 2–2 | Dewa United | Soreang |
| 19:00 UTC+7 | Sekulić 51'; Klok 54' | Summmary; Report | Egy 23'; Sadaoui 45+1'; Messidoro (yellow card) 87' | Stadium: Si Jalak Harupat Stadium; Attendance: 20,146; Referee: Candra |

| 20 October 2026 6 | Dewa United | 2–0 | Persijap Jepara | Serang |
| 19:00 UTC+7 | Jenner (yellow card) 33'; Mangabeira (yellow card) 38'; Kuipers 79'; Pedro 90+2' | Summary; Report | Kalezić (yellow card) 29' | Stadium: Banten International Stadium; Attendance: 774; Referee: Rio Permana Putra |

| 25 October 2026 7 | Arema Malang | 4–0 | Dewa United | Kepanjen |
| 15:30 UTC+7 | Careca 30' 52'; Achmad (yellow card) 45+3'; Otusanya 65'; Landis (yellow card) 66'; Syahrul (yellow card) 84'; Guevara 90+5' | Summmary; Report | Kuipers (yellow card) 90+1' | Stadium: Kanjuruhan Stadium; Attendance: 1,106; Referee: Asep Yandis |

| 31 October 2026 8 | Dewa United Banten F.C. | 2–1 | Persija Jakarta | Serang |
| 19:00 UTC+7 | Denílson 42'; Kuipers (yellow card) 74'; Fatari (yellow card) 78'; Jenner (yellow card) 82'; Marukawa 85' | Summary; Report | Rayhan 4' (yellow card) 66'; Ridho (yellow card) 9'; Dony Tri (yellow card) 41' (yellow-red card) 66'; Rio (yellow card) 72' | Stadium: Banten International Stadium; Attendance: 993; Referee: M. Erfan Efendi |

| 6 November 2026 9 | PSIM Yogyakarta | 1–2 | Dewa United | Bantul |
| 15:30 UTC+7 | Ramos (yellow card) 6'; Iqbal (yellow card) 56'; Vidal 66' (yellow card) 68'; Sheva (yellow card) 90+8' | Summmary; Report | Denílson 11' (pen.) (yellow card) 12'; Kambuaya (yellow card) 20'; Edo (yellow card) 77'; Marukawa 90+4' | Stadium: Sultan Agung Stadium; Attendance: 3,025; Referee: Gedion Dapaherang |

=== Group C ===
| Pos | Team | Pld | W | D | L | GF | GA | GD | Pts | Qualification |
|---|---|---|---|---|---|---|---|---|---|---|
| 1 | Dewa United Banten (1) | 1 | 1 | 0 | 0 | 3 | 1 | +2 | 3 | Advance to round of 12 |
| 2 | Persiraja (2) | 0 | 0 | 0 | 0 | 0 | 0 | 0 | 0 | |
| 3 | Persita (1) | 1 | 0 | 0 | 1 | 1 | 3 | −2 | 0 | |

Updated to match(es) played on 3 November 2026. Source: 2026–27 I.League Cup
Rules for classification: 1) Points; 2) Head-to-head points; 3) Head-to-head goal difference; 4) Head-to-head goals scored; 5) Goal difference; 6) Goals scored; 7) Fair-play points; 8) Draw.

| 3 November 2026 | Dewa United Banten (1) | 3–1 | Persita (1) | Serang |
| 19:00 | Denílson 7' 85'; Struick 43' | Report | Bessa 56' | Stadium: Banten International Stadium; Attendance: 510; Referee: Axel Febrian Sinaga |

| 24 November 2026 | Persiraja (2) | v | Dewa United Banten (1) | Banda Aceh |
| 20:30 | | Report | | Stadium: H. Dimurthala Stadium |

== Statistics ==
=== Appearances and goals ===
Last updated on 5 September 2026

Players with no appearances are not included on the list.

| No. | Pos | Nat | Player | Total | | Super League | | Piala Indonesia | |
| No. | Pos | Nat | Player | Apps | Goals | Apps | Goals | Apps | Goals |
Goalkeepers
| 1 | GK | (Indonesia) IDN | Muhammad Riyandi | 1 | 0 | 0 | 0 | 1 | 0 |
| 92 | GK | (Netherlands) NED | Sonny Stevens | 9 | 0 | 9 | 0 | 0 | 0 |
Defenders
| 2 | DF | (Netherlands) NED | Nick Kuipers | 8 | 1 | 7+1 | 1 | 0 | 0 |
| 4 | DF | (Brazil) BRA | Johnathan Pereira | 3 | 1 | 2+1 | 1 | 0 | 0 |
| 14 | DF | (Indonesia) IDN | Brian Fatari | 3 | 0 | 0+2 | 0 | 1 | 0 |
| 17 | DF | (Jamaica) JAM | Damion Lowe | 5 | 0 | 2+2 | 0 | 1 | 0 |
| 22 | DF | (South Korea) KOR | Ko Myeong-seok | 9 | 0 | 9 | 0 | 0 | 0 |
| 23 | DF | (Indonesia) IDN | Ady Setiawan | 7 | 0 | 3+3 | 0 | 1 | 0 |
| 25 | DF | (Indonesia) IDN | Alfharezzi Buffon | 10 | 0 | 4+5 | 0 | 0+1 | 0 |
| 37 | DF | (Indonesia) IDN | Alta Ballah | 10 | 0 | 8+1 | 0 | 1 | 0 |
| 97 | DF | (Indonesia) IDN | Edo Febriansah | 8 | 0 | 2+5 | 0 | 0+1 | 0 |
Midfielders
| 5 | MF | (Brazil) BRA | Jean Mangabeira | 9 | 0 | 9 | 0 | 0 | 0 |
| 6 | MF | (Indonesia) IDN | Ivar Jenner | 9 | 0 | 8 | 0 | 1 | 0 |
| 11 | MF | (Japan) JPN | Taisei Marukawa | 9 | 3 | 5+3 | 3 | 1 | 0 |
| 19 | MF | (Indonesia) IDN | Ricky Kambuaya | 3 | 0 | 1+1 | 0 | 0+1 | 0 |
| 26 | MF | (Indonesia) IDN | Farhan Saviola | 3 | 0 | 0+2 | 0 | 0+1 | 0 |
| 28 | MF | (Argentina) ARG | Alexis Messidoro | 5 | 0 | 1+4 | 0 | 0 | 0 |
| 63 | MF | (Indonesia) IDN | Ripal Wahyudi | 2 | 0 | 0+1 | 0 | 1 | 0 |
| 88 | MF | (Indonesia) IDN | Lotra Widiyanto | 1 | 0 | 0 | 0 | 0+1 | 0 |
Forwards
| 7 | FW | (Brazil) BRA | Denílson Jr. | 10 | 8 | 9 | 6 | 1 | 2 |
| 9 | FW | (Brazil) BRA | Pedro | 4 | 1 | 0+4 | 1 | 0 | 0 |
| 10 | FW | (Indonesia) IDN | Egy Maulana Vikri | 10 | 1 | 7+2 | 1 | 1 | 0 |
| 27 | FW | (Indonesia) IDN | Rafael Struick | 10 | 2 | 7+2 | 1 | 1 | 1 |
| 70 | FW | (Brazil) BRA | Carlos Iury | 4 | 1 | 3+1 | 1 | 0 | 0 |
| 77 | FW | (Morocco) MAR | Noah Sadaoui | 5 | 1 | 5 | 1 | 0 | 0 |

Last updated: 5 September 2026.
Source: Soccerway
