= 2025–26 Dewa United Banten F.C. season =

Indonesian football club season

Dewa United Banten F.C.
2025–26 season
- President: Tommy Hermawan Lo
- Coach: (Netherlands) Jan Olde Riekerink
- Stadium: Banten International Stadium
- Super League: 7th
- AFC Challenge League: Quarter final
- Top goalscorer: League: Alex Martins (20); All: Alex Martins (20)
- Biggest win: PSBS Biak 0-5 Dewa United; Super League, 8 May 2026
- Biggest defeat: Borneo Samarinda 4-0 Dewa United; Super League, 5 November 2025
Home colours	Away colours	Third colours

The 2025–26 season is Dewa United's 4th consecutive season in top-flight following its success in promoted from the 2021–22 Liga 2. This is Dewa United's third season under Dutch coach Jan Olde Riekerink, having successfully brought the team to runner up position in the previous 2024–25 Liga 1 (Indonesia). In addition to the domestic league, the club also participate in the 2025–26 AFC Challenge League.

== Squad ==
As of 12 February 2026

No.	Player	Nationality	Date of birth (age)	Previous club	Notes
Goalkeepers
1	Muhammad Natshir	(Indonesia)	13 February 1993 (age 33)	(Indonesia) Persib Bandung	
31	Dafa Setiawarman	(Indonesia)	12 February 2008 (age 18)	(Indonesia) Dewa United U20	
60	Yofandani Pranata	(Indonesia)	9 April 2001 (age 25)	(Indonesia) PSIS Semarang	
92	Sonny Stevens	(Netherlands)	22 June 1992 (age 34)	(Greece) OFI Crete F.C.	
Defenders
2	Nick Kuipers	(Netherlands)	8 October 1992 (age 33)	(Indonesia) Persib Bandung	
3	Wahyu Prasetyo	(Indonesia)	21 March 1998 (age 28)	(Indonesia) Malut United	
4	Johnathan Pereira	(Brazil)	4 April 1995 (age 31)	(Bulgaria) CSKA Sofia II	
12	Rizdjar Nurviat	(Indonesia)	2 January 2006 (age 20)	(Indonesia) Borneo Samarinda	On loan from Borneo Samarinda
14	Brian Fatari	(Indonesia)	20 December 1999 (age 26)	(Indonesia) Persipura Jayapura	
17	Damion Lowe	(Jamaica)	5 May 1993 (age 33)	(United States) Houston Dynamo	
23	Ady Setiawan	(Indonesia)	10 September 1994 (age 32)	(Indonesia) RANS Nusantara	
37	Altalariq Ballah	(Indonesia)	30 December 2000 (age 25)	(Indonesia) Persebaya Surabaya	
97	Edo Febriansah	(Indonesia)	25 July 1997 (age 29)	(Indonesia) Persib Bandung	
Midfielders
5	Stefano Lilipaly	(Indonesia)	10 January 1990 (age 36)	(Indonesia) Borneo Samarinda	On loan from Borneo Samarinda
6	Theo Numberi	(Indonesia)	1 September 2001 (age 25)	(Indonesia) Persipura Jayapura	
7	Vico Duarte	(Brazil)	3 December 1996 (age 29)	(Indonesia) Malut United	On loan from Malut United
8	Hugo Gomes	(Brazil)	18 March 1995 (age 31)	(Indonesia) Madura United	
11	Taisei Marukawa	(Japan)	30 January 1997 (age 29)	(Indonesia) PSIS Semarang	
15	Rangga Muslim	(Indonesia)	3 May 1994 (age 32)	(Indonesia) Bhayangkara Presisi	
16	Kafiatur Rizky	(Indonesia)	17 July 2006 (age 20)	(Indonesia) Borneo Samarinda	
18	Ivar Jenner	(Indonesia)	10 January 2004 (age 22)	(Netherlands) FC Utrecht	
19	Ricky Kambuaya	(Indonesia)	5 May 1996 (age 30)	(Indonesia) Persib Bandung	
28	Alexis Messidoro	(Argentina)	13 May 1997 (age 29)	(Indonesia) Persis Solo	
33	Tristan Raissa	(Indonesia)	24 January 2008 (age 18)	(Indonesia) Dewa United U20	
Forwards
10	Egy Maulana Vikri	(Indonesia)	7 July 2000 (age 26)	(Slovakia) ViOn Zlaté Moravce	
27	Rafael Struick	(Indonesia)	27 March 2003 (age 23)	(Australia) Brisbane Roar	
39	Alex Martins	(Brazil)	8 June 1993 (age 33)	(Indonesia) Bhayangkara Presisi	
77	Noah Sadaoui	(Morocco)	14 September 1993 (age 33)	(India) Kerala Blasters	On loan from Kerala Blasters
99	Kodai Tanaka	(Japan)	23 December 1999 (age 26)	(Indonesia) Persis Solo	On loan from Persis Solo

== Coaching staff ==
Position	Name
Team manager	(Indonesia) Judo Iswantoro
Head coach	(Netherlands) Jan Olde Riekerink
Assistant head coach	(Netherlands) Roy Hendriksen
Assistant coach	(Indonesia) Bayu Eka Sari
Assistant coach	(Indonesia) Firman Utina
Goalkeeper coach	(Netherlands) Frank Kooiman
Physical coach	(Netherlands) Jan Kluitenberg
Assistant physical coach	(Indonesia) Hendra Pratama
Video Analyst	(Netherlands) Jordy Kluitenberg
Video Analyst	(Indonesia) Arya Luthfy

== Transfers ==
=== In ===
Date	Position	Player	From	Ref
Pre-Season
26 June 2025	DF	(Netherlands) Nick Kuipers	(Indonesia) Persib Bandung	
29 June 2025	DF	(Indonesia) Edo Febriansah	(Indonesia) Persib Bandung	
1 July 2025	DF	(Indonesia) Wahyu Prasetyo	(Indonesia) Malut United	
3 July 2025	DF	(Indonesia) Akbar Arjunsyah	(Indonesia) Persija Jakarta	
5 July 2025	DF	(Brazil) Cassio Scheid	(Vietnam) SHB Da Nang	
8 July 2025	FW	(Cameroon) Privat Mbarga	(Indonesia) Bali United	
16 July 2025	FW	(Indonesia) Rafael Struick	(Australia) Brisbane Roar	
16 September 2025	DF	(Brazil) Johnathan Pereira	(Bulgaria) CSKA Sofia II	
Mid-Season
6 February 2026	MF	(Indonesia) Ivar Jenner	(Netherlands) FC Utrecht	
12 February 2026	DF	(Jamaica) Damion Lowe	(United States) Houston Dynamo	

=== Loan in ===
Date	Position	Player	Loaned From	Ref
Pre-Season
6 July 2025	FW	(Indonesia) Stefano Lilipaly	(Indonesia) Borneo Samarinda	
28 August 2025	DF	(Indonesia) Rizdjar Nurviat	(Indonesia) Borneo Samarinda	
Mid-Season
14 January 2026	MF	(Brazil) Vico Duarte	(Indonesia) Malut United	
22 January 2026	FW	(Morocco) Noah Sadaoui	(India) Kerala Blasters	
20 February 2026	FW	(Japan) Kodai Tanaka	(Indonesia) Persis Solo	

=== Out ===
Date	Position	Player	To	Ref
Pre-Season
28 May 2025	DF	(Indonesia) Reva Adi Utama	(Indonesia) PSIM Yogyakarta	
3 June 2025	DF	(Portugal) Ângelo Meneses	(Indonesia) Semen Padang	
3 June 2025	DF	(North Macedonia) Risto Mitrevski	(Indonesia) Persebaya Surabaya	
12 June 2025	FW	(Indonesia) Ahmad Nufiandani	(Indonesia) Madura United	
Mid-Season
11 February 2026	DF	(Brazil) Cássio Scheid	-	

=== Loan out ===
Date	Position	Player	Loaned To	Ref
Mid-Season
7 January 2026	DF	(Indonesia) Akbar Arjunsyah	(Indonesia) Persijap Jepara	
7 January 2026	MF	(Indonesia) Dani Saputra	(Indonesia) PSMS Medan	
8 January 2026	FW	(Indonesia) Feby Eka Putra	(Indonesia) Garudayaksa F.C.	
16 January 2026	FW	(Cameroon) Privat Mbarga	(Indonesia) Bhayangkara Presisi	
5 February 2026	FW	(Indonesia) Septian Bagaskara	(Indonesia) Persis Solo	

== Pre-season ==
=== Piala Presiden ===
==== Group B ====
Pos	Team	Pld	W	D	L	GF	GA	GD	Pts	Qualification
1	(Thailand) Port	2	2	0	0	4	1	+3	6	Advance to the Final
2	(Indonesia) Dewa United	2	0	1	1	2	3	−1	1	Advance to the Third place play-off
3	(Indonesia) Persib (H)	2	0	1	1	1	3	−2	1	

Source: Piala Presiden 2025
Rules for classification: Tiebreakers
(H) Hosts

8 July 2025
19:30

Persib	1–1	Dewa United
Wiliam Marcílio 65'	Report	Egy MV 90+2' (pen.)

Jalak Harupat Stadium, Bandung
Attendance: 19,652
Referee: Asker Najafaliev (Uzbekistan)

10 July 2025
15:30

Dewa United	1–2	Port
S.Lilipaly 10'	Report	Pato 45+2'; I. Fandi 90+4'

Jalak Harupat Stadium, Bandung
Attendance: 4,573
Referee: Razlan Joffri Ali (Malaysia)

==== Third place play-off ====
12 July 2025
19:30

Liga Indonesia All-Stars	0–2	(Indonesia) Dewa United
	Report	Marukawa 60'; Alex M. 68'

Jalak Harupat Stadium, Bandung
Attendance: 4,553
Referee: Yudi Nurcahya (Indonesia)

=== Friendly matches ===
Win Draw Loss

19 July 2025 1	Dewa United	2–1	Visakha FC	Tangerang
15:30 UTC+7				Stadium: Dewa United Training Ground; Attendance: 0

22 July 2025 2	Dewa United	2–2	Kuching City F.C.	Tangerang
15:30 UTC+7				Stadium: Dewa United Training Ground; Attendance: 0

== Competitions ==
=== Overview ===
Competition	First match	Last match	Starting round	Final position	Record							
Competition	First match	Last match	Starting round	Final position	Pld	W	D	L	GF	GA	GD	Win %
Indonesia Super League	9 August 2025	22 May 2026	Matchday 1		34	16	5	13	44	37	+7	47.06
AFC Challenge League	26 October 2025	12 March 2026	Group stage	Quarter-finals	5	2	2	1	11	5	+6	40.00
Total					39	18	7	14	55	42	+13	46.15

Source: Competitions

=== Indonesia Super League ===
==== Matches ====
Win Draw Loss

09 August 2025 1	Dewa United	1–3	Malut United	Serang
19:00 UTC+7		(LIB)		Stadium: Banten International Stadium

15 August 2025 2	Semen Padang	2–0	Dewa United	Padang
15:30 UTC+7		(LIB)		Stadium: Gelora Haji Agus Salim Stadium

22 August 2025 3	Dewa United	3–1	Persik Kediri	Serang
19:00 UTC+7		(LIB)		Stadium: Banten International Stadium

29 August 2025 4	Dewa United	1–3	Persija Jakarta	Serang
19:00 UTC+7		(LIB)		Stadium: Banten International Stadium

13 September 2025 5	Arema Malang	1–2	Dewa United	Kepanjen
15:30 UTC+7		(LIB)		Stadium: Kanjuruhan Stadium

20 September 2025 6	Dewa United	3–1	PSBS Biak	Serang
15:30 UTC+7		(LIB)		Stadium: Banten International Stadium

26 September 2025 7	Dewa United	1–1	Persebaya Surabaya	Serang
19:00 UTC+7		(LIB)		Stadium: Banten International Stadium

16 October 2025 9	Dewa United	0–2	Madura United	Serang
19:00 UTC+7		(LIB)		Stadium: Banten International Stadium

22 October 2025 10	PSIM Yogyakarta	2–0	Dewa United	Bantul
15:30 UTC+7		(LIB)		Stadium: Sultan Agung Stadium

5 November 2025 11	Borneo Samarinda	4–0	Dewa United	Samarinda
19:00 UTC+7		(LIB)		Stadium: Segiri Stadium

9 November 2025 12	Dewa United	0–1	PSM Makassar	Serang
15:30 UTC+7		(LIB)		Stadium: Banten International Stadium

21 November 2025 13	Persib Bandung	1–0	Dewa United	Bandung
19:00 UTC+7		(LIB)		Stadium: Gelora Bandung Lautan Api Stadium

29 November 2025 14	Dewa United	1–0	Persita Tangerang	Serang
15:30 UTC+7		(LIB)		Stadium: Banten International Stadium

20 December 2025 15	Dewa United	5–1	Persis Solo	Serang
15:30 UTC+7		(LIB)		Stadium: Banten International Stadium

29 December 2025 8 (Note: The match was originally scheduled for 5 October 2025, postponed due to preparation for the Indonesia national football team in fourth round of the 2026 FIFA World Cup qualification.)	Bali United	0–0	Dewa United	Gianyar
15:30 UTC+7		(LIB)		Stadium: Kapten I Wayan Dipta Stadium

5 January 2026 16	Bhayangkara Presisi	1–0	Dewa United	Bandar Lampung
15:30 UTC+7		(LIB)		Stadium: Sumpah Pemuda Stadium

12 January 2026 17	Persijap Jepara	0–3	Dewa United	Jepara
19:00 UTC+7		(LIB)		Stadium: Gelora Bumi Kartini Stadium

26 January 2026 18	Dewa United	2–0	Arema Malang	Serang
19:00 UTC+7		(LIB)		Stadium: Banten International Stadium

1 February 2026 19	Persebaya Surabaya	1–1	Dewa United	Surabaya
19:00 UTC+7		(LIB)		Stadium: Gelora Bung Tomo Stadium

7 February 2026 20	Persik Kediri	2–1	Dewa United	Kediri
15:30 UTC+7		(LIB)		Stadium: Brawijaya Stadium

14 February 2026 21	PSM Makassar	0–2	Dewa United	Parepare
15:30 UTC+7		(LIB)		Stadium: Gelora B.J. Habibie Stadium

22 February 2026 22	Dewa United	2–1	Borneo Samarinda	Serang
20:30 UTC+7		(LIB)		Stadium: Banten International Stadium

26 February 2026 23	Persita Tangerang	0–1	Dewa United	Tangerang
20:30 UTC+7		(LIB)		Stadium: Indomilk Arena

1 March 2026 24	Dewa United	0–2	Bhayangkara Presisi	Tangerang
20:30 UTC+7		(LIB)		Stadium: Indomilk Arena

15 March 2026 25	Persija Jakarta	1–1	Dewa United	Jakarta
20:30 UTC+7	Emaxwell (yellow card) 21' (goal) 45+4'; Bruno Tubarão (yellow card) 26'	(LIB) (LIBMS)	Damion Lowe (yellow card) 21'; Alexis Messidoro 55'; Jajá (yellow card) 56'; Ricky Kambuaya (yellow card) 87'	Stadium: Jakarta International Stadium; Attendance: 19,555; Referee: Naufal Adya Fairuski

3 April 2026 26	Dewa United	1–0	PSIM Yogyakarta	Serang
19:00 UTC+7		(LIB)		Stadium: Banten International Stadium

12 April 2026 27	Malut United	1–2	Dewa United	Ternate
19:00 UTC+7	Yance Sayuri (yellow card) 25'; David da Silva 45+2' (pen.); Wbeymar Angulo (yellow card) 45+6'	(LIB)	Alex Martins 22' 90+7' (yellow card) 90+7'; Damion Lowe (yellow card) 47'; Ivar Jenner (yellow card) 89'	Stadium: Gelora Kie Raha Stadium; Attendance: 2112; Referee: Muhammad Tri Santoso

20 April 2026 28	Dewa United	2–2	Persib Bandung	Serang
19:00 UTC+7	Alex Martins 24' (yellow card) 57' (yellow-red card) 64'; Johnathan Pereira (yellow card) 31'; Ricky Kambuaya (yellow card) 45+2' (goal) 61'	(LIB)	Beckham Putra (yellow card) 18'; Thom Haye 77' (pen.); Andrew Jung 86'; Marc Klok (yellow card) 87'	Stadium: Banten International Stadium; Attendance: 0 Referee: Yoko Soprianto

25 April 2026 29	Madura United	1–2	Dewa United	Bangkalan
15:30 UTC+7	Júnior Brandão 7'; Riquelme Sousa (yellow card) 47'	(LIB)	Ricky Kambuaya (yellow card) 32' (goal) 49' 53'; Ivar Jenner (yellow card) HT; Egy Maulana (yellow card) 58'; Noah Sadaoui (yellow card) 85'; Johnathan Pereira (yellow card) 87'; Damion Lowe (yellow card) 90+7'	Stadium: Gelora Bangkalan Stadium; Attendance: 866; Referee: Yudi Nurcahya

29 April 2026 30	Dewa United	1–0	Persijap Jepara	Serang
19:00 UTC+7	Ricky Kambuaya (yellow card) 43'; Alex Martins 54' (pen.); Ivar Jenner (yellow card) 62'; Nick Kuipers (yellow card) 80'	(LIB)	França (yellow card) 2'; Borja Herrera (yellow card) 58'; Iker Guarrotxena (yellow card) 90+3'	Stadium: Banten International Stadium; Attendance: 989; Referee: Rio Permana Putra

3 May 2026 31	Dewa United	1–0	Semen Padang	Serang
19:00 UTC+7	Noah Sadaoui 31'; Alexis Messidoro (yellow card) 61'; Edo Febriansah (yellow card) 69'	(LIB)	Ade Kristiano (yellow card) 42'; Boubakary Diarra (yellow card) 90+8'	Stadium: Banten International Stadium; Attendance: 792; Referee: Muhammad Iqbaluddin

8 May 2026 32	PSBS Biak	0–5	Dewa United	Bantul
19:00 UTC+7	Heri Susanto (yellow card) 57'; Luquinhas (yellow card) 90'; Nurhidayat (yellow card) 90+2'	(LIB)	Alex Martins 4' 56' 90+1' 90+6'; Brian Fatari (yellow card) 6'; Taisei Marukawa 51'; Damion Lowe (yellow card) 90+7'	Stadium: Sultan Agung Stadium; Attendance: 0 Referee: Rio Permana Putra

16 May 2026 33	Persis Solo	1-0	Dewa United	Surakarta
19:00 UTC+7	Luka Dumančić 76'; Ikhwan Tanamal (yellow card) 90'; Jefferson Carioca (yellow card) 90+2'	(LIB) (LIBMS)	Damion Lowe (yellow card) 40'; Ricky Kambuaya (yellow card) 57'; Alta Ballah (yellow card) 57'; Nick Kuipers (yellow card) 65'	Stadium: Manahan Stadium; Attendance: 9939; Referee: Thoriq Alkatiri

22 May 2026 34	Dewa United	0–1	Bali United	Serang
19:00 UTC+7	Noah Sadaoui (yellow card) 55'; Ricky Kambuaya (yellow card) 69'; Damion Lowe (yellow card) 78'	(LIB) (LIBMS)	Kadek Agung 42'; Brandon Wilson (yellow card) 69'; Mike Hauptmeijer (yellow card) 76'; Yusuf Meilana (yellow card) 84'	Stadium: Banten International Stadium; Attendance: 993; Referee: Muhammad Tri Satoso

==== League standing ====
Pos	Team	Pld	W	D	L	GF	GA	GD	Pts
5	Bhayangkara Presisi	34	16	5	13	53	45	+8	53 (Note: Head-to-head points: Bhayangkara Presisi 9, Malut United 6, Dewa United Banten 3.)
6	Malut United	34	15	8	11	68	53	+15	53
7	Dewa United Banten	34	16	5	13	44	37	+7	53
8	Bali United	34	14	9	11	57	48	+9	51
9	Arema	34	13	9	12	53	47	+6	48

Source: Super League 2025–26
Rules for classification: 1) Points; 2) Head-to-head points; 3) Head-to-head goal difference; 4) Head-to-head goals scored; 5) Goal difference; 6) Goals scored; 7) Fair-play points; 8) Draw.

=== AFC Challenge League ===
==== Group Stage ====
Pos	Team	Pld	W	D	L	GF	GA	GD	Pts	Qualification	DUB	PPC	TNC	SNU
1	(Indonesia) Dewa United Banten (H)	3	2	1	0	9	2	+7	7	Advance to Quarter-finals		1–1	4–0	4–1
2	(Cambodia) Phnom Penh Crown	3	2	1	0	7	4	+3	7	Advance to Quarter-finals			3–2	3–1
3	(Chinese Taipei) Tainan City	3	1	0	2	4	8	−4	3					2–1
4	(Myanmar) Shan United	3	0	0	3	3	9	−6	0					

Source: AFC
Rules for classification: Tiebreakers
(H) Hosts
26 October 2025
19:00 UTC+7

Dewa United (Indonesia)	1–1	(Cambodia) Phnom Penh Crown
Egy 70'	Report	Dyer 75'

Sports Centre Kelapa Dua, Tangerang
Attendance: 871
Referee: Clarence Leow (Singapore)

29 October 2025
19:00 UTC+7

Tainan City (Chinese Taipei)	0–4	(Indonesia) Dewa United
	Report	Messidoro 7', 28'; Egy 38'; Mbarga 57'

Sports Centre Kelapa Dua, Tangerang
Attendance: 447
Referee: Ali Al Ashkar (Lebanon)

1 November 2025
19:00 UTC+7

Dewa United (Indonesia)	4–1	(Myanmar) Shan United
Egy 10'; Jajá 20'; Messidoro 58' (pen.); Struick 61'	Report	M. Souza 42'

Sports Centre Kelapa Dua, Tangerang
Attendance: 676
Referee: Ali Al Ashkar (Lebanon)

==== Knockout stage ( Quarter finals) ====
5 March 2026
20:30 UTC+8

Manila Digger (Philippines)	1–0	(Indonesia) Dewa United Banten
Nishioka 21'	Report

Rizal Memorial Stadium, Manila
Attendance: 1,471
Referee: Du Jianxin (China)
12 March 2026
20:30 UTC+7

Dewa United Banten (Indonesia)	2–2	(Philippines) Manila Digger
Lowe 66', 81'	Report	Gai 35'; Joof 52'

Sports Centre Kelapa Dua, Tangerang
Attendance: 1,231
Referee: Daniel Elder (Australia)

Manila Digger won 3–2 on aggregate.

== Statistics ==
=== Appearances and goals ===
Players with no appearances are not included on the list.

No.	Pos	Nat	Player	Total		Super League		AFC Challenge League	
No.	Pos	Nat	Player	Apps	Goals	Apps	Goals	Apps	Goals
2	DF	(Netherlands) NED	Nick Kuipers	33	0	25+3	0	4+1	0
3	DF	(Indonesia) IDN	Wahyu Prasetyo	27	0	9+15	0	2+1	0
4	DF	(Brazil) BRA	Johnathan Pereira	20	0	14+3	0	2+1	0
5	MF	(Indonesia) IDN	Stefano Lilipaly	31	2	11+16	2	4	0
6	MF	(Indonesia) IDN	Theo Numberi	16	0	9+6	0	0+1	0
7	MF	(Brazil) BRA	Vico Duarte	9	2	3+4	2	1+1	0
8	MF	(Brazil) BRA	Jajá	27	2	19+3	1	5	1
10	FW	(Indonesia) IDN	Egy Maulana Vikri	33	3	13+15	0	3+2	3
11	FW	(Japan) JPN	Taisei Marukawa	30	3	23+5	3	2	0
12	DF	(Indonesia) IDN	Rizdjar Nurviat	13	0	11	0	1+1	0
14	DF	(Indonesia) IDN	Brian Fatari	32	0	24+4	0	2+2	0
15	MF	(Indonesia) IDN	Rangga Muslim	2	0	0+1	0	0+1	0
16	MF	(Indonesia) IDN	Kafiatur Rizky	6	1	6	1	0	0
17	DF	(Jamaica) JAM	Damion Lowe	12	2	10	0	2	2
18	MF	(Indonesia) IDN	Ivar Jenner	14	0	11+2	0	1	0
19	MF	(Indonesia) IDN	Ricky Kambuaya	32	4	26+1	4	5	0
23	DF	(Indonesia) IDN	Ady Setiawan	8	0	0+5	0	0+3	0
27	FW	(Indonesia) IDN	Rafael Struick	23	1	6+14	0	0+3	1
28	MF	(Argentina) ARG	Alexis Messidoro	35	10	29+1	7	5	3
37	DF	(Indonesia) IDN	Altalariq Ballah	26	0	14+9	0	2+1	0
39	FW	(Brazil) BRA	Alex Martins	33	20	31	20	1+1	0
77	FW	(Morocco) MAR	Noah Sadaoui	14	1	8+4	1	0+2	0
92	GK	(Netherlands) NED	Sonny Stevens	38	0	33	0	5	0
97	DF	(Indonesia) IDN	Edo Febriansah	29	0	21+3	0	4+1	0
99	FW	(Japan) JPN	Kodai Tanaka	2	0	0+2	0	0	0
Player who featured but departed the club during the season:
9	FW	(Cameroon) CMR	Privat Mbarga	13	1	2+8	0	3	1
13	MF	(Indonesia) IDN	Dani Saputra	1	0	1	0	0	0
20	FW	(Indonesia) IDN	Septian Bagaskara	9	1	0+8	1	0+1	0
41	DF	(Brazil) BRA	Cássio Scheid	12	0	4+7	0	1	0
