= 2023–24 Liga 1 (Indonesia) =

Liga 1
- Season: 2023–24
- Dates: Regular Series: 1 July 2023 – 30 April 2024; Championship Series: 14 – 31 May 2024
- Champions: Persib; 2nd Liga 1 title 8th Indonesian title
- Relegated: Bhayangkara; Persikabo 1973; RANS Nusantara
- AFC Champions League Two: Persib
- AFC Challenge League: Madura United
- ASEAN Club Championship: Borneo Samarinda; PSM
- Matches: 314
- Goals: 904 (2.88 per match)
- Top goalscorer: David da Silva (30 goals)
- Biggest home win: Bhayangkara 7–0 Persik (16 April 2024)
- Biggest away win: Arema 0–4 Barito Putera (5 August 2023); Dewa United 1–5 Persib (26 November 2023); RANS Nusantara 0–4 Persib (3 March 2024); Borneo Samarinda 0–4 Madura United (17 April 2024); Barito Putera 1–5 Bhayangkara (25 April 2024)
- Highest scoring: Persik 4–4 PSS (24 April 2024)
- Longest winning run: 8 matches Borneo Samarinda
- Longest unbeaten run: 19 matches Borneo Samarinda
- Longest winless run: 18 matches RANS Nusantara
- Longest losing run: 6 matches Persita; Persikabo 1973
- Highest attendance: 55,103; Persija 1–0 Persebaya (30 July 2023)
- Lowest attendance: 0 RANS Nusantara 2–1 Persikabo 1973 (3 July 2023); RANS Nusantara 1–1 Bhayangkara (9 November 2023); RANS Nusantara 0–0 Persebaya (1 December 2023); RANS Nusantara 0–1 Borneo Samarinda (16 December 2023) (excluding matches played behind closed doors)
- Total attendance: 1,643,917
- Average attendance: 5,126

The 2023–24 Liga 1 (also known as the 2023–24 BRI Liga 1 for sponsorship reasons) was the 7th season of Liga 1 under its current name and the 14th season of the association football, the top Indonesian football league since its establishment in 2008. The season started on 1 July 2023 and ended on 31 May 2024.

PSM Makassar were the reigning champions after outpacing their closest rivals, Persija Jakarta and Persib Bandung in the 2022–23 Liga 1 season.

== Overview ==
No teams were relegated last season due to the impact of the Kanjuruhan Stadium disaster which lead to the cancellation of 2022–23 Liga 2. Therefore, the 18 teams competing in the league remained the same as the preceding season.

Following the decision from the AFC Competitions Committee to increase the foreign players quota for AFC club competitions from the existing 3+1 quota to 5+1 (five players of any nationality and one from an AFC member association) that will take effect from the 2023–24 season onwards, PSSI increased the number of foreign players in Liga 1 clubs from four per team (with one of them coming from a member association of the AFC) to six per team with one of them coming from an ASEAN country.

=== Stadiums and locations ===
Locations of non-Java-based 2023–24 Liga 1 teams
Locations of Java-based 2023–24 Liga 1 teams

Team	Home city	Stadium	Capacity
Arema	Malang	Gajayana Stadium (Note: Arema will play their first few home games at Kapten I Wayan Dipta in Gianyar due to renovation works at Gajayana.)	25,000
Bali United	Gianyar	Kapten I Wayan Dipta Stadium	18,000
Barito Putera	Banjarmasin	Demang Lehman Stadium, at Banjarbaru (Note: Barito Putera played their home matches at Sultan Agung in Bantul since week 25 due to their stadium being renovated.)	15,000
Bhayangkara	Bekasi	Patriot Candrabhaga Stadium	30,000
Borneo Samarinda	Samarinda	Segiri Stadium (Note: Borneo Samarinda and PSM are playing their home matches at Batakan in Balikpapan since week 24 due to their stadium being renovated.)	13,000
Dewa United	South Tangerang	Indomilk Arena	30,000
Madura United	Pamekasan	Gelora Ratu Pamelingan Stadium (Note: Madura United also registered Gelora Bangkalan in Bangkalan as their home stadium.)	13,500
Persebaya	Surabaya	Gelora Bung Tomo Stadium	46,806
Persib	Bandung	Gelora Bandung Lautan Api Stadium	38,000
Persija	Jakarta	Gelora Bung Karno Stadium (Note: Persija also registered the Patriot Candrabhaga in Bekasi as their home stadium.)	77,193
Persik	Kediri	Brawijaya Stadium	20,000
Persikabo 1973	Bogor	Pakansari Stadium (Note: Persikabo will play majority of their home games during the first half of the season at Wibawa Mukti in Cikarang, Bekasi due to renovation works at Pakansari.)	30,000
Persis	Surakarta	Manahan Stadium	20,000
Persita	Tangerang	Indomilk Arena	15,000
PSIS	Semarang	Jatidiri Stadium	25,000
PSM	Makassar	Gelora B.J. Habibie Stadium, at Parepare	20,000
PSS	Sleman	Maguwoharjo Stadium	31,700
RANS Nusantara	Sleman	Maguwoharjo Stadium	31,700

=== Personnel and kits ===
Team	Head coach	Captain	Kit manufacturer	Shirt sponsor(s)
Arema	(Indonesia) Widodo Cahyono Putro	(Indonesia) Johan Alfarizi	(Indonesia) SEA^{5}	Indomie^{1}, Vidio^{1}, Mitra Bukalapak^{1}, PStore^{1}, Extra Joss^{2}, Pertamina^{2}
Bali United	(Brazil) Stefano Cugurra	(Indonesia) Fadil Sausu	(Indonesia) SPECS	Indofood^{1}, Bank Ina^{1}, Mandiri Coal^{1}, Mandiri Tranship^{1}, Mandiri Contractor^{1}, Mandiri Services^{1}, Nusadana^{1}, Riung^{1}, Alderon^{1}, KukuBima^{1}, Gojek^{1}, Tokopedia^{1}, CBN Fiber^{2}, Indomie^{2}, Intersport Filtered by Pria Punya Selera^{2}, YCAB Foundation^{3}, Vidio^{3}
Barito Putera	(Indonesia) Rahmad Darmawan	(Indonesia) Rizky Pora	(Indonesia) H^{5}	Hasnur Group^{1}
Bhayangkara	(Indonesia) Emral Abus (caretaker)	(Indonesia) Dendy Sulistyawan	(Indonesia) Mills	BNI^{1}, Envi^{1}, Jasa Raharja^{3}, Gojek^{3}
Borneo Samarinda	(Netherlands) Pieter Huistra	(Indonesia) Diego Michiels	(Indonesia) Etams	Ansaf^{1}, Pupuk Kaltim^{1}, Ghani Raya Mandiri^{3}
Dewa United	(Netherlands) Jan Olde Riekerink	(Indonesia) Rangga Muslim	(Indonesia) DRX	Gudang Kripto^{1}, Nusapay^{1}, Carstensz Residence and Mall BSD^{2}, JHL Solitaire^{3}
Madura United	(Brazil) Mauricio Souza	(Indonesia) Fachruddin Aryanto	(Indonesia) XTen	KANA^{1}, POJUR^{1}, Oxygen.id^{2}
Persebaya	(Northern Ireland) Paul Munster	(Indonesia) Reva Adi Utama	(Indonesia) AZA	Kapal Api^{1}, Extra Joss^{1}, Citicon^{1}, Teh Bonteh^{1}, MPM Honda Distributor^{2}, Antangin^{2}
Persib	(Croatia) Bojan Hodak	(Indonesia) Marc Klok	(Indonesia) Sportama	Indofood^{1}, Aladin Bank^{1}, Pria Punya Selera^{1}, Intersoccer^{1}, Greenfields^{1}, Kopi ABC^{2}, ID Express^{3}, Indomie^{3}
Persija	(Germany) Thomas Doll	(Indonesia) Andritany Ardhiyasa	(Indonesia) Juaraga	KukuBima^{1}, Indomie^{1}, PStore^{1}, Amman Mineral^{1}, BSM Lines^{1}, Bluebird^{2}, PSJTV^{2}, Ithaca Resources^{3}
Persik	(Brazil) Marcelo Rospide	(Indonesia) Arthur Irawan	(Spain) Kelme	Athletes For Good^{1}, Extra Joss^{2}
Persikabo 1973	(Indonesia) Djadjang Nurdjaman	(Indonesia) Manahati Lestusen	(Indonesia) Mar10	SBOTOP^{1} (round 1-2); Artha Graha Peduli^{1} (round 3 onwards)^{6}
Persis	(Bosnia and Herzegovina) Milomir Šešlija	(Indonesia) Eky Taufik	(Indonesia) Made by club	Free Fire^{1}, Aladin Bank^{1}, Gurih^{1}, Smartfren^{1}, Vidio^{2}, ID Express^{2}, Hyundai^{3}
Persita	(Chile) Luis Durán	(Indonesia) Muhammad Toha	(Indonesia) Mills	Indomilk^{1}, Moya^{1}, Matrix Broadband^{1}, Aetra Tangerang^{1}, Extra Joss^{2}, Indomie^{2}, Palang Merah Indonesia^{2}, SOS Children's Villages Indonesia^{2}
PSIS	(Malta) Gilbert Agius	(Indonesia) Septian David Maulana	(Indonesia) RIORS	nexa^{1}, KukuBima^{1}, Indomie^{1}, Yamaha Mataram Sakti^{2}, Anargya Aset Manajemen^{3}
PSM	(Portugal) Bernardo Tavares	(Indonesia) Muhammad Arfan	(Indonesia) Rewako^{5}	Honda^{1}, Astra Motor^{1}
PSS	(Serbia) Risto Vidaković	(Indonesia) Kim Kurniawan	(Indonesia) SMBD	MedcoEnergi^{1}, Amman Mineral^{1}, Indomie^{1}, Ithaca Resources^{1}, Extra Joss^{2}
RANS Nusantara	(Argentina) Angel Alfredo Vera	(Indonesia) Erwin Ramdani	(Singapore) HUNDRED	Shopee^{1}, Sukun^{1}, Lemonilo^{2}, ARTOTEL Wanderlust^{3}

Notes:

1. On the front of shirt.
2. On the back of shirt.
3. On the sleeves.
4. On the shorts.
5. Apparel made by club.
6. Persikabo changed their main sponsor from SBOTOP to Artha Graha Peduli due to Indonesian law prohibiting the usage of gambling websites as sponsorship

=== Coaching changes ===
Team	Outgoing head coach	Manner of departure	Date of vacancy	Week	Table	Replaced by	Date of appointment
Persik	(Portugal) Divaldo Alves	Resigned	14 April 2023	Pre-season		(Brazil) Marcelo Rospide	1 May 2023
PSS	(Indonesia) Seto Nurdiantoro	Sacked	24 April 2023	Pre-season		(Romania) Marian Mihail	27 April 2023
RANS Nusantara	(Brazil) Rodrigo Santana	Sacked	28 April 2023	Pre-season		(Portugal) Eduardo Almeida	15 May 2023
Madura United	(Brazil) Osvaldo Lessa	End of caretaker role	30 April 2023	Pre-season		(Brazil) Mauricio Souza	1 May 2023
Bhayangkara	(Indonesia) Agus Sugeng Riyanto	Did not have AFC Pro license	30 June 2023	Pre-season		(Indonesia) Emral Abus	30 June 2023
Persib	(Spain) Luis Milla	Resigned	15 July 2023	3	9th	(Indonesia) Yaya Sunarya (caretaker)	15 July 2023
Persikabo 1973	(Singapore) Aidil Sharin Sahak	Resigned	23 July 2023	4	13th	(Mexico) Salvador Rodriguez	2 August 2023
Persib	(Indonesia) Yaya Sunarya	End of caretaker role	26 July 2023	4	16th	(Croatia) Bojan Hodak	26 July 2023
Persebaya	(Indonesia) Aji Santoso	Sacked	4 August 2023	6	16th	(Indonesia) Uston Nawawi (caretaker)	4 August 2023
Arema	(Indonesia) Joko Susilo	Became academy technical director	10 August 2023	7	18th	(Indonesia) Kuncoro (caretaker)	10 August 2023
Persikabo 1973	(Mexico) Salvador Rodriguez	Became technical director	15 August 2023	8	15th	(Indonesia) Aji Santoso	15 August 2023
Arema	(Indonesia) Kuncoro	End of caretaker role	23 August 2023	9	18th	(Portugal) Fernando Valente	23 August 2023
Persita	(Chile) Luis Durán	Sacked	7 September 2023	11	15th	(Indonesia) Ilham Jaya Kesuma (caretaker)	7 September 2023
Persita	(Indonesia) Ilham Jaya Kesuma	End of caretaker role	12 September 2023	11	15th	(Portugal) Divaldo Alves	12 September 2023
Persebaya	(Indonesia) Uston Nawawi	End of caretaker role	14 September 2023	11	6th	(Spain) Josep Gombau	14 September 2023
Bhayangkara	(Indonesia) Emral Abus	Sacked	3 October 2023	14	18th	(Argentina) Mario Gómez	3 October 2023
PSS	(Romania) Marian Mihail	Sacked	9 October 2023	15	14th	(Belgium) Bertrand Crasson (caretaker)	9 October 2023
Persebaya	(Spain) Josep Gombau	Sacked	28 October 2023	17	11th	(Indonesia) Uston Nawawi (caretaker)	28 October 2023
PSS	(Belgium) Bertrand Crasson	End of caretaker role	17 November 2023	17	11th	(Serbia) Risto Vidaković	17 November 2023
Persis	(Mexico) Leonardo Medina	Sacked	13 December 2023	22	15th	(Indonesia) Tithan Wulung Suryata (caretaker)	13 December 2023
Persebaya	(Indonesia) Uston Nawawi	End of caretaker role	4 January 2024	22	13th	(Northern Ireland) Paul Munster	4 January 2024
Persis	(Indonesia) Tithan Wulung Suryata	End of caretaker role	9 January 2024	22	15th	(Bosnia and Herzegovina) Milomir Seslija	9 January 2024
Arema	(Portugal) Fernando Valente	Sacked	9 February 2024	24	16th	(Indonesia) Widodo Cahyono Putro	9 February 2024
Bhayangkara	(Argentina) Mario Gómez	Sacked	29 February 2024	26	18th	(Indonesia) Emral Abus (caretaker)	29 February 2024
RANS Nusantara	(Portugal) Eduardo Almeida	Sacked	29 February 2024	26	10th	(Indonesia) Francis Wewengkang (caretaker)	1 March 2024
Persikabo 1973	(Indonesia) Aji Santoso	Sacked	9 March 2024	28	18th	(Indonesia) Djadjang Nurdjaman	12 March 2024
RANS Nusantara	(Indonesia) Francis Wewengkang	End of caretaker role	24 March 2024	29	13th	(Argentina) Angel Alfredo Vera	24 March 2024
Persita	(Portugal) Divaldo Alves	Sacked	30 March 2024	30	15th	(Chile) Luis Durán	30 March 2024

== Foreign players ==
Following the decision from the AFC Competitions Committee to increase the foreign players quota for AFC club competitions from the existing 3+1 quota to 5+1 (five players of any nationality and one from an AFC member association) that will take effect from the 2023–24 season onwards, PSSI increased the number of foreign players in Liga 1 clubs from four per team (with one of them coming from a member association of the AFC) to six per team with one of them coming from an ASEAN country.

- Players named in **bold** indicates the player was registered during the mid-season transfer window.
- Former players named in italics are players that were out of squad or left the club within the season, after the pre-season transfer window, or in the mid-season transfer window, and at least had one appearance.

Team	Player 1	Player 2	Player 3	Player 4	Player 5	ASEAN player	Former players
Arema	(Argentina) Ariel Lucero	(Australia) Charles Lokolingoy	(Brazil) Charles Almeida	(Colombia) **Julián Guevara**		(Philippines) Julian Schwarzer	(Bolivia) Gilbert Álvarez (Brazil) Gustavo (Mali) Ichaka Diarra
Bali United	(Brazil) Adilson Maringá	(Brazil) Éber Bessa	(Brazil) Jefferson Assis	(Cameroon) Privat Mbarga	(Palestine) Mohammed Rashid	(Thailand) Elias Dolah	(Iraq) Brwa Nouri
Barito Putera	(Brazil) **Devid**	(Brazil) Gustavo Tocantins	(Brazil) Murilo	(Brazil) Renan Alves	(Philippines) Carli de Murga	(Philippines) Mike Ott	(Mali) Makan Konaté
Bhayangkara	(Argentina) **Marcelo Herrera**	(Belgium) **Radja Nainggolan**	(Brazil) Anderson Salles	(Brazil) **Júnior Brandão**	(Uruguay) Matías Mier	(Singapore) **Zulfahmi Arifin**	(Afghanistan) Adam Najem (Australia) **George Blackwood** (Brazil) Alef (Brazil) Crislan (Philippines) Dylan De Bruycker
Borneo Samarinda	(Argentina) Felipe Cadenazzi	(Brazil) Léo Lelis	(Japan) Kei Hirose	(Netherlands) **Wiljan Pluim**	(Portugal) Silvério	(Myanmar) Win Naing Tun	(Brazil) Matheus Pato (Netherlands) Jelle Goselink
Dewa United	(Brazil) Alex Martins	(Greece) Dimitris Kolovos	(Lebanon) Majed Osman	(Netherlands) Sonny Stevens	(North Macedonia) Risto Mitrevski	(Philippines) **OJ Porteria**	(Malaysia) Junior Eldstål
Madura United	(Brazil) Cleberson	(Brazil) **Dalberto**	(Brazil) Hugo Gomes	(Brazil) **Lucas Frigeri**	(Mexico) Francisco Rivera	(Singapore) Jacob Mahler	(Brazil) Júnior Brandão (Brazil) Lulinha
Persebaya	(Brazil) Bruno Moreira	(Brazil) **Paulo Henrique**	(Brazil) **Róbson Duarte**	(Brazil) **Yan Victor**	(Serbia) Dušan Stevanović		(Brazil) Paulo Victor (Japan) Sho Yamamoto (Portugal) Zé Valente (Singapore) Song Ui-young
Persib	(Brazil) Ciro Alves	(Brazil) David da Silva	(Italy) **Stefano Beltrame**	(Netherlands) Nick Kuipers	(Spain) Alberto Rodríguez	(Philippines) **Kevin Ray Mendoza**	(Gabon) Lévy Madinda (Philippines) Daisuke Sato (Spain) Tyronne del Pino
Persija	(Brazil) **Gustavo**	(Croatia) Marko Šimić	(Czech Republic) Ondřej Kúdela	(Japan) Ryo Matsumura	(Poland) Maciej Gajos	(Philippines) Oliver Bias	
Persik	(Brazil) Anderson Nascimento	(Brazil) Renan Silva	(Nepal) Rohit Chand	(Portugal) Flávio Silva	(Portugal) **Zé Valente**	(Philippines) Simen Lyngbø	(Brazil) Jefinho
Persikabo 1973	(Brazil) **Cacá Basilio**	(Brazil) **Eduardo Kau**	(Brazil) Pedrinho	(Brazil) **Pedro**	(Canada) **Keven Alemán**	(Myanmar) **Myat Kaung Khant**	(Brazil) Rafael Conrado (Cape Verde) José Varela (France) **Messemo Bakayoko** (Japan) Kaishu Yamazaki (Philippines) Kainoa Bailey (Serbia) Nikola Kovačević
Persis	(Argentina) Alexis Messidoro	(Brazil) Jaimerson	(Japan) **Sho Yamamoto**	(Mali) Moussa Sidibé	(Spain) Roni	(Philippines) Diego Bardanca	(Spain) Fernando Rodríguez
Persita	(Argentina) Ezequiel Vidal	(Argentina) Ramiro Fergonzi	(South Korea) Bae Sin-yeong	(Portugal) **Mohcine Nader**	(Uzbekistan) Javlon Guseynov	(Philippines) Christian Rontini	(Argentina) Mateo Bustos
PSIS	(Brazil) Lucão	(Brazil) Vitinho	(France) Boubakary Diarra	(Japan) Taisei Marukawa		(Timor-Leste) Gali Freitas	(Cape Verde) Carlos Fortes
PSM	(Brazil) **Zé Paulo**	(Cape Verde) Yuran Fernandes	(Japan) Kenzo Nambu	(Portugal) Adilson Silva	(United States) **Victor Mansaray**	(Timor-Leste) **João Pedro**	(Brazil) Everton (Netherlands) Wiljan Pluim (Philippines) Kike Linares
PSS	(Argentina) Jonathan Bustos	(Brazil) Thales Lira	(Burundi) **Elvis Kamsoba**	(Lebanon) Jihad Ayoub	(South Sudan) **Ajak Riak**	(Philippines) Anthony Pinthus	(Japan) Kei Sano (Ukraine) Yevhen Bokhashvili
RANS Nusantara	(Angola) Evandro Brandão	(Japan) Mitsuru Maruoka	(Portugal) Ângelo Meneses	(Portugal) Kiko	(Portugal) Tavinho	(Philippines) Kenshiro Daniels	

== Regular series ==
=== League table ===
Pos	Team	Pld	W	D	L	GF	GA	GD	Pts	Qualification or relegation
1	Borneo Samarinda	34	21	7	6	52	31	+21	70	Qualification to the 2024–25 ASEAN Club Championship group stage and Championship Series (Note: Persija, the 2022–23 Liga 1 runners-up, qualified but declined to participate. Thus, their spot was given to Borneo Samarinda, the 2023–24 Liga 1 regular series premiers.)
2	Persib (C)	34	16	14	4	65	38	+27	62	Qualification to the 2024–25 AFC Champions League Two group stage and Championship Series
3	Bali United	34	17	7	10	55	43	+12	58	Qualification to the Championship Series
4	Madura United	34	15	10	9	58	45	+13	55	Qualification to the 2024–25 AFC Challenge League group stage and Championship Series
5	Dewa United	34	14	12	8	59	48	+11	54	
6	PSIS	34	15	8	11	49	41	+8	53	
7	Persis	34	14	8	12	50	47	+3	50	
8	Persija	34	12	12	10	49	41	+8	48 (Note: Ranked on head-to-head points: Persija 6, Persik 0.)	
9	Persik	34	13	9	12	58	55	+3	48	
10	Barito Putera	34	11	13	10	51	48	+3	46	
11	PSM	34	11	11	12	44	39	+5	44	Qualification to the 2024–25 ASEAN Club Championship group stage (Note: Qualified as 2022–23 Liga 1 champions.)
12	Persebaya	34	10	12	12	33	46	−13	42	
13	PSS	34	9	12	13	49	53	−4	39 (Note: Ranked on head-to-head points: PSS 4, Persita 1.)	
14	Persita	34	10	9	15	44	63	−19	39	
15	Arema	34	10	8	16	42	60	−18	38	
16	RANS Nusantara (R)	34	8	11	15	36	52	−16	35	Relegation to 2024–25 Liga 2
17	Bhayangkara (R)	34	5	11	18	42	56	−14	26	Relegation to 2024–25 Liga 2
18	Persikabo 1973 (R)	34	4	8	22	44	74	−30	20	Relegation to 2024–25 Liga 2

Source: BRI Liga 1 2023–24
Rules for classification: 1) Points; 2) Head-to-head points; 3) Head-to-head goal difference; 4) Head-to-head goals scored; 5) Goal difference; 6) Goals scored; 7) Fair-play points; 8) Draw.
(C) Champions; (R) Relegated

=== Position by round ===
Team ╲ Round	1	2	3	4	5	6	7	8	9	10	11	12	13	14	15	16	17	18	19	20	21	22	23	24	25	26	27	28	29	30	31	32	33	34
Arema	15	13	17	17	17	18	18	18	18	17	16	16	16	16	16	16	16	16	16	16	16	16	16	16	16	16	15	14	15	16	16	15	13	15
Bali United	16	18	15	9	4	5	7	5	7	3	8	11	11	7	6	6	6	3	4	3	3	2	2	4	4	3	4	3	3	3	3	3	3	3
Barito Putera	2	4	1	3	10	4	2	3	2	4	2	4	7	8	7	8	7	7	7	8	8	9	8	7	7	9	7	10	9	9	9	9	10	10
Bhayangkara	17	17	18	18	18	17	17	17	17	18	18	18	18	18	18	18	18	18	18	18	18	18	18	18	18	18	17	17	17	17	17	17	17	17
Borneo Samarinda	7	3	8	4	6	7	9	6	3	2	3	2	2	1	1	1	1	1	1	1	1	1	1	1	1	1	1	1	1	1	1	1	1	1
Dewa United	5	2	2	1	1	3	6	11	11	8	9	10	13	13	9	7	8	8	10	11	11	11	10	11	11	7	9	7	7	7	6	5	6	5
Madura United	9	5	10	7	2	1	1	1	1	1	1	1	1	2	2	2	3	4	6	6	6	5	5	6	5	5	5	5	4	4	4	4	4	4
Persebaya	3	6	12	11	15	16	15	12	8	9	6	8	6	6	8	9	11	12	13	14	14	14	13	12	13	13	10	12	12	10	12	12	12	12
Persib	8	10	14	16	11	12	16	16	14	11	11	7	5	3	3	4	2	2	2	2	2	3	3	3	3	2	2	2	2	2	2	2	2	2
Persija	10	11	6	10	5	2	3	7	9	12	12	9	8	9	10	11	13	9	8	9	9	8	9	9	10	11	8	11	10	11	10	10	9	8
Persik	12	14	7	15	16	13	14	9	13	13	13	14	14	12	12	12	9	10	9	7	7	6	6	5	6	6	6	6	6	6	7	7	7	9
Persikabo 1973	14	16	16	13	13	9	13	15	16	16	17	17	17	17	17	17	17	17	17	17	17	17	17	17	17	17	18	18	18	18	18	18	18	18
Persis	13	12	9	14	14	14	11	14	10	14	14	13	10	10	11	13	10	11	11	12	12	15	15	13	12	12	11	8	8	8	8	8	8	7
Persita	18	8	5	2	3	6	10	13	15	15	15	15	15	15	15	15	15	15	15	15	15	13	14	15	15	15	16	16	16	15	15	16	15	14
PSIS	1	9	3	5	7	11	5	4	6	7	5	5	4	4	5	5	5	5	3	4	4	4	4	2	2	4	3	4	5	5	5	6	5	6
PSM	11	15	11	6	8	10	8	10	12	10	10	6	9	11	13	10	12	13	12	10	10	10	11	10	8	8	12	9	11	12	11	11	11	11
PSS	6	7	13	12	12	15	12	8	5	6	7	12	12	14	14	14	14	14	14	13	13	12	12	14	14	14	14	15	14	14	13	13	14	13
RANS Nusantara	4	1	4	8	9	8	4	2	4	5	4	3	3	5	4	3	4	6	5	5	5	7	7	8	9	10	13	13	13	13	14	14	16	16

Qualification to the Championship Series
Relegation to 2024–25 Liga 2

Source: BRI Liga 1 2023–24

== Results ==
=== Fixtures & results ===
Home \ Away	ARE	BAL	BRT	BHA	BOR	DEW	MDR	PBY	PSB	PSJ	KDR	KBO	SOL	PTA	SMG	PSM	PSS	RNS
Arema	—	1–3	0–4	0–0	0–1	2–1	1–1	0–1	3–3	3–2	0–1	1–0	3–1	0–0	1–4	3–2	2–1	0–1
Bali United	3–2	—	2–1	2–1	1–2	3–1	2–1	3–1	0–0	1–0	1–1	2–0	3–2	3–0	2–0	3–2	0–1	1–2
Barito Putera	1–0	4–3	—	1–5	0–0	2–1	1–2	2–0	1–1	2–2	2–0	1–1	2–0	2–0	0–0	3–1	3–1	1–1
Bhayangkara	0–2	1–2	1–1	—	0–2	2–3	3–2	1–2	1–2	2–2	7–0	1–3	0–1	3–0	1–1	0–0	1–4	1–2
Borneo Samarinda	1–2	3–1	2–1	4–0	—	3–1	0–4	2–1	1–1	3–1	3–0	3–2	1–0	2–1	2–0	1–0	1–0	1–1
Dewa United	1–0	1–1	2–2	2–2	2–1	—	2–2	1–1	1–5	2–0	3–0	2–1	0–0	4–1	1–4	1–1	3–1	5–0
Madura United	0–0	1–2	4–1	0–0	1–2	1–4	—	3–0	0–1	2–0	3–2	3–2	4–3	3–2	1–0	2–0	0–0	2–2
Persebaya	3–1	0–2	1–1	1–0	2–1	0–3	0–0	—	2–3	1–1	2–1	1–2	1–1	1–0	1–1	1–0	2–1	2–2
Persib	2–2	0–0	1–1	0–0	2–1	2–2	1–1	3–1	—	2–1	0–2	2–0	2–2	5–0	3–0	0–0	4–1	2–1
Persija	2–2	1–1	1–1	4–1	1–1	4–1	0–1	1–0	1–1	—	2–0	4–0	1–0	1–1	2–1	1–1	1–0	1–2
Persik	5–2	1–0	3–1	2–0	1–1	0–0	4–0	4–0	1–2	1–2	—	5–2	2–0	1–1	1–1	1–1	4–4	4–3
Persikabo 1973	0–1	3–2	3–4	2–2	2–3	1–1	0–3	1–1	1–3	0–0	2–3	—	2–2	2–2	2–3	0–1	2–3	2–1
Persis	1–1	3–1	2–1	2–1	2–1	1–2	3–2	2–3	2–1	2–2	2–1	2–1	—	1–2	2–0	1–0	1–1	2–0
Persita	4–3	4–2	2–2	0–1	0–1	1–0	1–3	1–1	3–3	1–0	2–2	2–1	2–1	—	2–0	0–1	2–3	3–0
PSIS	2–0	2–1	1–0	3–1	0–0	1–1	2–2	2–0	1–2	2–1	2–1	3–0	0–2	4–0	—	2–1	1–0	2–1
PSM	3–0	0–0	2–0	1–1	1–1	1–2	0–2	0–0	4–2	2–3	1–2	3–1	1–0	4–0	3–1	—	2–1	3–2
PSS	4–1	0–1	2–1	3–1	0–1	2–3	1–1	0–0	1–0	1–3	2–2	2–2	2–2	3–3	2–2	1–1	—	1–0
RANS Nusantara	2–3	1–1	1–1	1–1	0–1	0–0	3–1	0–0	0–4	0–1	1–0	2–1	1–2	0–1	2–1	1–1	0–0	—

Source: BRI Liga 1 2023–24
Legend: Blue = home team win; Yellow = draw; Red = away team win.
For upcoming matches, an "a" indicates there is an article about the rivalry between the two participants.

== Championship Series ==
The first-through-fourth ranked teams in the regular series will play in a two-legged knockout format.

=== Bracket ===
Semi-finals
1	Borneo Samarinda	0	2	2
4	Madura United	1	3	4
2	Persib	1	3	4
3	Bali United	1	0	1

Finals
Madura United	0	1	1
Persib	3	3	6
Third place play-off
Borneo Samarinda	0	4	4
Bali United	0	2	2

=== Semi-finals ===
Summary

The first legs were played on 14–15 May and the second legs were played on 18–19 May 2024.

Team 1	Agg.	Team 2	1st leg	2nd leg
Borneo Samarinda	2–4	Madura United	0–1	2–3
Persib	4–1	Bali United	1–1	3–0

Matches

15 May 2024
19:00 WIB (UTC+7)

Madura United	1–0	Borneo Samarinda
Hugo Gomes 77' (pen.)	Report

Gelora Bangkalan Stadium, Bangkalan
Attendance: 5,634
Referee: Thoriq Munir Alkatiri (Bandung)
19 May 2024
20:00 WITA (UTC+8)

Borneo Samarinda	2–3	Madura United
Alfharezzi 12'; Cadenazzi 45+2' (pen.)	Report	Dalberto 19'; Malik Risaldi 58', 67'

Batakan Stadium, Balikpapan
Attendance: 10,567
Referee: Naufal Adya Fairuski (Bandung)

Madura United won 4–2 on aggregate.

14 May 2024
20:00 WITA (UTC+8)

Bali United	1–1	Persib
Jefferson 83'	Report	David da Silva 90+9'

Bali United Training Center, Gianyar
Attendance: 500
Referee: Heru Cahyono (South Jakarta)
18 May 2024
19:00 WIB (UTC+7)

Persib	3–0	Bali United
Ciro 31'; Febri 39'; Edo 71'	Report

Jalak Harupat Stadium, Bandung
Attendance: 21,593
Referee: Rio Permana Putra (Pekanbaru)

Persib won 4–1 on aggregate.

=== Third place play-off ===
Summary

The first leg was played on 25 May and the second leg was played on 30 May 2024.

Team 1	Agg.	Team 2	1st leg	2nd leg
Borneo Samarinda	4–2	Bali United	0–0	4–2

Matches

25 May 2024
20:00 WITA (UTC+8)

Bali United	0–0	Borneo Samarinda
	Report

Kapten I Wayan Dipta Stadium, Gianyar
Attendance: 7,577
Referee: Yudi Nurcahya (Bandung)
30 May 2024
20:00 WITA (UTC+8)

Borneo Samarinda	4–2	Bali United
Pluim 3', 22'; Cadenazzi 8', 70'	Report	Elias Dolah 30'; Irfan Jaya 39'

Batakan Stadium, Balikpapan
Attendance: 2,448
Referee: Sance Lawita (Manado)

Borneo Samarinda won 4–2 on aggregate.

=== Finals ===
Summary

The first leg was played on 26 May and the second leg was played on 31 May 2024.

Team 1	Agg.	Team 2	1st leg	2nd leg
Madura United	1–6	Persib	0–3	1–3

Matches

26 May 2024
19:00 WIB (UTC+7)

Persib	3–0	Madura United
Ciro Alves 70'; David da Silva 90+4', 90+12'	Report

Jalak Harupat Stadium, Bandung
Attendance: 20,655
Referee: Tommi Manggopa (Bolaang Mongondow)
31 May 2024
19:00 WIB (UTC+7)

Madura United	1–3	Persib
Slamet Nurcahyono 90+7' (pen.)	Report	David da Silva 60'; Marc Klok 86'; Beckham Putra 90+2'

Gelora Bangkalan Stadium, Bangkalan
Attendance: 6,449
Referee: Aidil Azmi (Banda Aceh)

Persib won 6–1 on aggregate and qualified to 2024–25 AFC Champions League Two group stage. Madura United qualified to 2024–25 AFC Challenge League group stage.

== Qualification for the 2024–25 AFF & AFC Clubs Competitions ==
Team	Method of qualification	Date of qualification	Qualified to
Persib	2023–24 Liga 1 championship series champions	31 May 2024	2024–25 AFC Champions League 2 group stage
Madura United	2023–24 Liga 1 championship series runners-up	31 May 2024	2024–25 AFC Challenge League group stage
PSM	2022–23 Liga 1 champions	8 May 2024	2024–25 ASEAN Club Championship group stage
Borneo Samarinda	2023–24 Liga 1 regular series premiers and championship series third place	8 May 2024	2024–25 ASEAN Club Championship group stage

Notes

1. PSM (PSM): PSM, the previous season's champions, qualified for the 2024–25 ASEAN Club Championship based on that result.
2. Borneo Samarinda (BOR): Persija, the 2022–23 Liga 1 runners-up, qualified but declined to participate. Thus, their spot was given to Borneo Samarinda, the 2023–24 Liga 1 regular series premiers.

== Season statistics ==
=== Top scorers ===
Rank	Player	Team	Goals
1	(Brazil) David da Silva	Persib	30
2	(Portugal) Flávio Silva	Persik	23
3	(Brazil) Alex Martins	Dewa United	21
4	(Brazil) Gustavo	Arema (14)/Persija (2)	16
4	(Brazil) Júnior Brandão	Bhayangkara (7)/Madura United (9)	16
4	(Brazil) Ciro Alves	Persib	16
7	(Argentina) Felipe Cadenazzi	Borneo Samarinda	15
8	(Japan) Kenzo Nambu	PSM	14
9	(Brazil) Gustavo Tocantins	Barito Putera	13
9	(Uruguay) Matías Mier	Bhayangkara	13
9	(Indonesia) Malik Risaldi	Madura United	13

=== Hat-tricks ===
Player	For	Against	Result	Date
(Brazil) Gustavo	Arema	Persib	3–3 (H)	7 July 2023
(Brazil) David da Silva	Persib	Persita	5–0 (H)	1 October 2023
(Indonesia) Stefano Lilipaly	Borneo Samarinda	Dewa United	3–1 (H)	28 October 2023
(Argentina) Felipe Cadenazzi	Borneo Samarinda	Persik	3–0 (H)	2 November 2023
(Portugal) Flávio Silva	Persik	Madura United	4–0 (H)	8 November 2023
(Brazil) Ciro Alves	Persib	Dewa United	1–5 (A)	26 November 2023
(Mali) Moussa Sidibé	Persis	Madura United	3–2 (H)	30 January 2024
(Brazil) Alex Martins	Dewa United	RANS Nusantara	5–0 (H)	27 February 2024
(Portugal) Flávio Silva^{5}	Persik	Persikabo 1973	5–2 (H)	28 March 2024
(Uruguay) Matías Mier	Bhayangkara	Persik	7–0 (H)	16 April 2024
(Brazil) David da Silva	Persib	Persebaya	3–1 (H)	20 April 2024
(Portugal) Flávio Silva	Persik	PSS	4–4 (H)	24 April 2024
(Uruguay) Matías Mier	Bhayangkara	Barito Putera	1–5 (A)	25 April 2024

Note: ^{5} – player scored 5 goals

=== Top assists ===
Rank	Player	Club	Assist
1	(Indonesia) Stefano Lilipaly	Borneo Samarinda	17
2	(Mexico) Francisco Rivera	Madura United	15
3	(Brazil) Ciro Alves	Persib	12
3	(Argentina) Alexis Messidoro	Persis	12
5	(Uruguay) Matías Mier	Bhayangkara	10
5	(Japan) Taisei Marukawa	PSIS	10
7	(Brazil) Éber Bessa	Bali United	9
7	(Japan) Ryo Matsumura	Persija	9
7	(Argentina) Ezequiel Vidal	Persita	9

=== Clean sheets ===
Rank	Player	Club	Clean sheets
1	(Indonesia) Nadeo Argawinata	Borneo Samarinda	13
2	(Brazil) Adilson Maringá	Bali United	10
2	(Indonesia) Reza Arya Pratama	PSM	10
4	(Indonesia) Dikri Yusron	Persik	8
5	(Indonesia) Ega Rizky	Barito Putera	7
5	(Netherlands) Sonny Stevens	Dewa United	7
5	(Brazil) Lucas Frigeri	Madura United	7
5	(Indonesia) Andritany Ardhiyasa	Persija	7
9	(Indonesia) Wawan Hendrawan	Madura United	6
9	(Indonesia) Andhika Ramadhani	Persebaya	6

=== Discipline ===
==== Player ====
- Most yellow cards: 13
  - (Indonesia) Jayus Hariono (Arema)
  - (Indonesia) Ricky Kambuaya (Dewa United)
- Most red cards: 3
  - (Indonesia) Jajang Mulyana (Bali United)

==== Club ====
- Most yellow cards: 113
  - Bali United
- Fewest yellow cards: 68
  - PSM
- Most red cards: 8
  - Bali United
- Fewest red cards: 0
  - Persita

== Attendances ==
Pos	Team	Total	High	Low	Average	Change
1	Persija	295,125	55,103	170	17,360	−2.6%
2	Persib	239,233	24,925	6,207	12,591	+67.9%
3	Persis	165,298	17,899	4,915	9,723	+101.0%
4	Persebaya	151,617	27,000	1,601	8,919	+42.1%
5	PSS	151,196	15,857	4,374	8,894	+10.1%
6	Borneo Samarinda	140,943	11,997	2,406	7,418	+44.8%
7	Bali United	102,868	10,167	500	5,414	+84.7%
8	PSIS	99,368	18,785	546	5,845	+34.3%
9	Persik	59,073	5,968	1,023	3,475	−0.4%
10	PSM	58,595	7,781	966	3,447	−54.2%
11	Barito Putera	55,375	7,666	3,154	3,257	−6.3%
12	Madura United	49,653	6,449	423	2,613	+10.3%
13	Persita	44,758	10,017	544	2,633	−10.2%
14	Persikabo 1973	11,874	6,467	177	698	−70.6%
15	Dewa United	10,310	1,871	267	607	−60.7%
16	Bhayangkara	5,486	1,026	136	323	−86.0%
17	Arema	2,224	349	34	131	−98.3%
18	RANS Nusantara	921	200	0	58	−96.7%
	League total	1,643,917	55,103	0	5,235	+1.9%

Source: BRI Liga 1 2023–24

== Awards ==
=== Monthly awards ===
Month	Coach of the Month		Player of the Month		Young Player of the Month		Goal of the Month	
Month	Coach	Club	Player	Club	Player	Club	Player	Club
July	(Germany) Thomas Doll	Persija	(Indonesia) Stefano Lilipaly	Borneo Samarinda	(Indonesia) Rizky Ridho	Persija	(Indonesia) Ezra Walian	Persib
August	(Brazil) Mauricio Souza	Madura United	(Mexico) Francisco Rivera	Madura United	(Indonesia) Husna Al Malik	Persikabo 1973	(Brazil) Ciro Alves	Persib
September	(Netherlands) Pieter Huistra	Borneo Samarinda	(Indonesia) Stefano Lilipaly	Borneo Samarinda	(Indonesia) Ramadhan Sananta	Persis	(Portugal) Zé Valente	Persebaya
October	(Croatia) Bojan Hodak	Persib	(Brazil) David da Silva	Persib	(Indonesia) Fajar Fathur Rahman	Borneo Samarinda	(Japan) Kenzo Nambu	PSM
November	(Brazil) Stefano Cugurra	Bali United	(Argentina) Felipe Cadenazzi	Borneo Samarinda	(Indonesia) Daffa Salman	PSM	(Canada) Keven Alemán	Persikabo 1973
December	(Brazil) Marcelo Rospide	Persik	(Brazil) Júnior Brandão	Bhayangkara	(Indonesia) Bagus Kahfi	Barito Putera	(Mexico) Francisco Rivera	Madura United
February	(Netherlands) Pieter Huistra	Borneo Samarinda	(Indonesia) Stefano Lilipaly	Borneo Samarinda	(Indonesia) Althaf Indie	Persis	(Indonesia) Lucky Oktavianto	Persikabo 1973

=== Annual awards ===
Award	Winner	Club	Ref.
Best Player	(Mexico) Francisco Rivera	Madura United	
Best Coach	(Croatia) Bojan Hodak	Persib	
Best Young Player	(Indonesia) Fajar Fathur Rahman	Borneo Samarinda	
Fair Play Team	Borneo Samarinda		
Best Referee	Nendi Rohaendi		

=== Team of the season ===
Pos.	Player	Team
GK	(Brazil) Adilson Maringá	Bali United
DF	(Indonesia) Fajar Fathur Rahman	Borneo Samarinda
DF	(Brazil) Cleberson	Madura United
DF	(Spain) Alberto Rodríguez	Persib
DF	(Indonesia) Ricky Fajrin	Bali United
MF	(Indonesia) Marc Klok	Persib
MF	(Brazil) Hugo Gomes	Madura United
MF	(Mexico) Francisco Rivera	Madura United
FW	(Indonesia) Stefano Lilipaly	Borneo Samarinda
FW	(Brazil) Ciro Alves	Persib
FW	(Brazil) David Da Silva	Persib

== See also ==
- 2023–24 Liga 2
- 2023–24 Liga 3
