= Ripal Wahyudi =

Indonesian footballer

Personal information
- Full name: Ripal Wahyudi
- Date of birth: 10 October 2000 (age 26)
- Place of birth: Garut, Indonesia
- Height: 1.68 m (5 ft 6 in)
- Position: Defensive midfielder

Team information
- Current team: Dewa United Banten
- Number: 63

Youth career
- 2018: Super Progresif Majalengka
- 2018–2019: Persip Pekalongan
- 2019–2020: Sukabumi

Senior career*
Years	Team	Apps	(Gls)
2021	Persip Pekalongan	7	(3)
2021–2022	Persipa Pati	15	(1)
2022–2023	Bhayangkara	11	(0)
2023–2024	Persebaya Surabaya	27	(1)
2024–2025	Persis Solo	21	(0)
2025–2026	Semen Padang	30	(1)
2026–	Dewa United Banten	1	(0)
- * Club domestic league appearances and goals as of 20 October 2026

Ripal Wahyudi (born 10 October 2000) is an Indonesian professional footballer who plays as a defensive midfielder for Super League club Dewa United Banten.

== Club career ==
=== Persip Pekalongan ===
Ripal is one of the young players promoted to main team Persip Pekalongan. On 31 October 2021, Ripal made his debut for Persip Pekalongan in the 2021 Liga 3 Central Java, also scored his first goal in a 1–1 draw over Persab Brebes at Hoegeng Stadium. He added his second goals of the season on 8 November 2021 with one goal against Slawi United in a 1–2 win, and confirmed to qualify for the second round of 2021 Liga 3 Central Java zone. And added his third goals of the season on 28 November 2021 with one goal against Persebi Boyolali, scored equalizer in a 2–4 lose, at the same time, it is certain that it doesn't qualify or only finishes in the top 10, even though it still has one more match left. He contributed with 7 league appearances, scored 3 goals during his 2021 season.

=== Persipa Pati ===
On 28 December 2021, Ripal signed a contract with another Liga 3 club Persipa Pati, he became an additional player in preparation for the 2021–22 Liga 3 National zone. On 6 February 2022, Ripal made his league debut for Persipa Pati, also scored his first goal in a 3–0 win over UMS 1905. He had a good season in this season with 8 appearances and scored one goal, while helping Persipa Pati finish to round of 16 Liga 3 this season, as well as promotion to the Liga 2 next season.

On 30 August 2022, Ripal made his Liga 2 debut for Persipa in a 1–2 win over Nusantara United. In his second season with Persipa Pati, Ripal only went on to make 7 appearances, because Liga 2 was suspended due to a tragedy.

=== Bhayangkara ===
Ahead of second round of 2022–23 Liga 1, he was signed by Bhayangkara. On 28 January 2023, Ripal made his debut for Bhayangkara in a 1–1 draw over Dewa United. He contributed with 11 league appearances, during his 2022–23 season.

=== Persebaya Surabaya ===
He was signed for Persebaya Surabaya alongside Yohanes Kandaimu to play in Liga 1 in the 2023–24 season. On 28 May 2023, Ripal made his club debut for in a pre-season friendly match against Bali United in a 3–1 win.

=== Persis Solo ===
In July 2024, Persis Solo signed Ripal to play in Liga 1 in the 2024–25 season.

== Career statistics ==
=== Club ===
As of 20 October 2026

Club	Season	League			Cup		Continental		Other		Total	
Club	Season	Division	Apps	Goals	Apps	Goals	Apps	Goals	Apps	Goals	Apps	Goals
Persip Pekalongan	2021	Liga 3	7	3	0	0	–		0	0	7	3
Persipa Pati	2021–22	Liga 3	8	1	0	0	–		0	0	8	1
Persipa Pati	2022–23	Liga 2	7	0	0	0	–		0	0	7	0
Bhayangkara	2022–23	Liga 1	11	0	0	0	–		0	0	11	0
Persebaya Surabaya	2023–24	Liga 1	27	1	0	0	–		0	0	27	1
Persis Solo	2024–25	Liga 1	21	0	0	0	–		0	0	21	0
Semen Padang	2025–26	Super League	30	1	0	0	–		0	0	30	1
Dewa United Banten	2026–27	Super League	1	0	0	0	–		0	0	1	0
Career total			112	6	0	0	0	0	0	0	112	6
