= Jean Mangabeira =

Brazilian footballer (born 1997)

Personal information
- Full name: Jean Mangabeira da Silva
- Date of birth: 10 March 1997 (age 29)
- Place of birth: Rondonópolis, Brazil
- Height: 1.85 m (6 ft 1 in)
- Position: Defensive midfielder

Team information
- Current team: Dewa United Banten
- Number: 5

Youth career
- Criciúma

Senior career*
| Years | Team | Apps | (Gls) |
| 2016–2019 | Criciúma | 67 | (0) |
| 2020–2022 | Capivariano | 0 | (0) |
| 2020–2021 | → Karviná (loan) | 42 | (0) |
| 2023 | Náutico | 37 | (3) |
| 2024 | Tacuary | 17 | (0) |
| 2025 | Botafogo-SP | 7 | (0) |
| 2025–2026 | Brusque | 24 | (1) |
| 2026 | Figueirense | 23 | (0) |
| 2026– | Dewa United Banten | 8 | (0) |
- * Club domestic league appearances and goals as of 31 October 2026

Jean Mangabeira da Silva (born 10 March 1997) is a Brazilian professional footballer who plays as a defensive midfielder for Super League club Dewa United Banten.

== Club career ==
Born in Rondonópolis, Brazil, Mangabeira began his professional career within the youth academy of Criciúma.

Mangabeira subsequently joined club Capivariano before moved abroad to Europe to join Czech First League club Karviná on loan in 2020, he made his league debut on 10 June 2020, coming on as a starter in a 0–1 lose over Jablonec. During his time with the club, Mangabeira made 42 league appearances and without scoring.

=== Náutico ===
In 2023, Mangabeira signed a contract with Náutico. On 2 May 2023, he scored his first league goal in his debut match against Manaus despite losing 1–2 in the 2023 Campeonato Brasileiro Série C. He added his second goals of the season on 16 July 2023 with one goal against Figueirense in a 2–1 home win.

=== Tacuary ===
In July 2024, he moved abroad, signed a contract with Tacuary in Paraguay. He made his league debut on 27 July 2024, coming on as a starter in a 0–0 draw against Sportivo Ameliano. On 18 August 2024, he picked up his first win with Tacuary in his third appearances in a 1–2 away win over Sol de América.

=== Figuerense ===
Mangabeira subsequently return to Brazil, joined Botafogo-SP, and Série C side Brusque. before signed a contract with another Série C club Figueirense in January 2026. He made his club debut on 13 April 2026, coming on as a substituted in a 1–3 home lose against Maringá. During the 2026 season with Figueirense, he made 26 league appearances and without scoring in all competitions.

=== Dewa United Banten ===
In mid-August 2026, Mangabeira officially completed a transfer to Indonesian Super League club Dewa United Banten, marking his first venture into Asian football following his extensive career in Brazil, the Czech Republic, and Paraguay. Mangabeira made his league debut for Dewa United Banten on 5 September 2026, coming on as a starter in a 0–1 away win against Persik Kediri at the Brawijaya Stadium.
