= Denílson (footballer, born 1995) =

Brazilian Brazilian footballer (born 1995)

Denílson Júnior
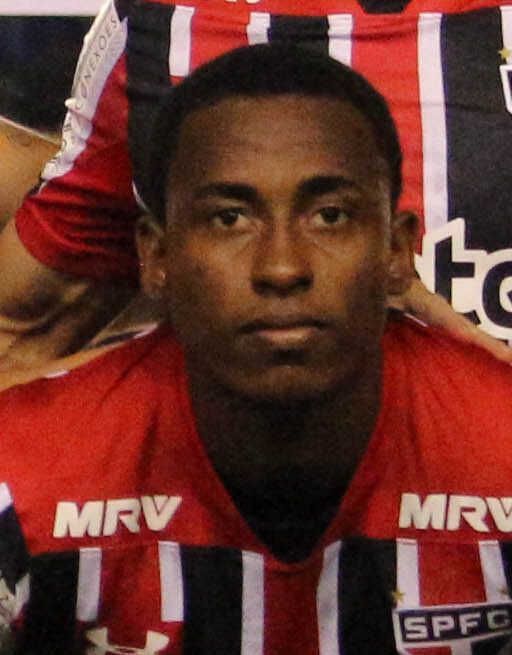
- Dení Jr with São Paulo in 2017

Personal information
- Full name: Denílson Pereira Júnior
- Date of birth: 18 July 1995 (age 31)
- Place of birth: Rio de Janeiro, Brazil
- Height: 1.85 m (6 ft 1 in)
- Position: Forward

Team information
- Current team: Dewa United Banten
- Number: 7

Youth career
- Fluminense

Senior career*
Years	Team	Apps	(Gls)
2013–2015	Fluminense	2	(1)
2015–2018	Granada B	38	(10)
2016	→ Neftçi (loan)	9	(1)
2017	→ Avaí (loan)	3	(0)
2017	→ São Paulo (loan)	12	(1)
2018	→ Vitória (loan)	6	(2)
2018–2021	Atlético Mineiro	8	(0)
2019	→ Al-Faisaly (loan)	10	(6)
2019–2020	→ Tondela (loan)	12	(3)
2020	→ Paços de Ferreira (loan)	13	(3)
2020–2021	→ Al Dhafra (loan)	12	(3)
2021–2022	Paços de Ferreira	30	(6)
2022–2023	Hatta		
2023	Famalicão	11	(0)
2023	Avaí	9	(4)
2023–2024	Hanoi	18	(6)
2024	Vila Nova	10	(0)
2025	Guarani	18	(3)
2025–2026	Ratchaburi	26	(15)
2026–	Dewa United Banten	8	(5)
- * Club domestic league appearances and goals as of 31 October 2026

Denílson Pereira Júnior (born 18 July 1995), commonly known as Denílson Júnior, is a Brazilian footballer who plays as a forward for Super League club Dewa United Banten.

== Club career ==
Born in Rio de Janeiro, Denílson graduated with Fluminense's youth setup. He made his first team – and Série A – debut on 9 June 2013, coming on as a second half substitute for Biro-Biro and scoring the winner in a 2–1 home success over Goiás.

Denílson appeared in only one more match before returning to the youth setup. On 31 January 2015 he joined Granada, being assigned to the reserves in Segunda División B.

On 9 August 2016, Denílson signed a season-long loan deal with Neftchi Baku, scoring once in nine appearances before having his loan deal terminated by Neftchi Baku on 18 November 2016. He then returned to Brazil and had a series of loan spells at Avaí, São Paulo and Vitória between 2017 and 2018.

On 20 June 2018, Denílson joined Atlético Mineiro on a five-year deal.

On 3 January 2019, Denílson joined Saudi club Al-Faisaly on a six-month loan deal from Atlético.

On 30 January 2023, Denílson returned to Portugal and signed a year-and-a-half contract with Famalicão.

=== Hanoi ===
On 2 November 2023, Denílson joined Vietnamese club Hanoi, signing a contract that expires in the end of the 2023–24 season. He was due to appear in a match against Becamex Binh Duong on 24 November 2023, but had to serve a two-match ban incurred while he was still at Avai for receiving a red card in a 0–2 home loss against Atlético Goianiense in September 2023.

On 10 December, Denílson made his debut for Hanoi, scoring a goal in a 2–0 league victory against Song Lam Nghe An. He scored again in Hanoi's next league match, a 2–0 away win to local rivals Viettel on 17 December. The next week, he scored for a third successive league game to equalise the score at Hong Linh Ha Tinh.
