= Ady Setiawan =

Indonesian footballer

Personal information
- Full name: Ady Setiawan
- Date of birth: 10 September 1994 (age 32)
- Place of birth: Bima, Indonesia
- Height: 1.75 m (5 ft 9 in)
- Positions: Right-back; defensive midfielder

Team information
- Current team: Dewa United Banten
- Number: 23

Youth career
- SSB Bangau Putra
- 2016: PON Sulsel

Senior career*
Years	Team	Apps	(Gls)
2015–2017	Martapura	42	(12)
2018–2019	Barito Putera	35	(3)
2020–2021	Persela Lamongan	3	(1)
2021–2022	Persebaya Surabaya	32	(0)
2022–2023	RANS Nusantara	34	(0)
2023–	Dewa United Banten	52	(0)
- * Club domestic league appearances and goals as of 11 October 2026

Ady Setiawan (born 10 September 1994) is an Indonesian professional footballer who plays for Super League club Dewa United Banten. A versatile player, Can has also played as a right-back, defensive midfielder and centre-back.

== Club career ==
=== Martapura FC ===
Setiawan started his professional career in 2015 with Liga 2 club Martapura, which was renamed in 2021 to Dewa United after an acquisition. At Martapura, which was based in South Kalimantan province, Setiawan played in 42 matches and scored 12 goals.

=== Barito Putera ===
Setiawan in 2018 signed a one-year contract with Liga 1 club Barito Putera, which is based in the same province as Martapura. Setiawan scored three goals in 35 matches in the 2018 Liga 1 season.

=== Persela Lamongan ===
Setiawan in 2020 moved to Persela Lamongan for the 2020 Liga 1 season that only lasted for three matches. Cash-strapped Persela failed to extend his contract after one year.

=== Persebaya Surabaya ===
Setiawan only became known nationally after he signed a contract in 2021 with Liga 1 club Persebaya Surabaya and participated in the 2021 Menpora Cup, the prelude to the 2021 Liga 1 season. His no-nonsense determination as a defensive midfielder earned him a call to train with the Indonesia national football team for the first time in his career.

=== RANS Nusantara ===
Ady was signed for RANS Nusantara to play in Liga 1 in the 2022–23 season. He made his league debut on 23 July 2022 in a match against PSIS Semarang at the Jatidiri Stadium, Semarang.

=== Dewa United ===
Ady was signed for Dewa United to play in Liga 1 in the 2023–24 season. He made his debut on 2 July 2023 in a match against Arema at the Indomilk Arena, Tangerang.

== International career ==
He earned his first cap in a 25 May 2021 friendly match in Dubai against Afghanistan, which was a warm-up ahead of the 2022 FIFA World Cup qualification matches in the United Arab Emirates.

== Career statistics ==
=== Club ===
As of 11 October 2026

Club	Season	League			Cup (Note: Includes Piala Indonesia)		Continental		Other (Note: Appearances in Indonesia President's Cup)		Total	
Club	Season	Division	Apps	Goals	Apps	Goals	Apps	Goals	Apps	Goals	Apps	Goals
Martapura	2016	ISC B	18	4	0	0	–		0	0	18	4
Martapura	2017	Liga 2	24	8	0	0	–		0	0	24	8
Martapura	Total		42	12	0	0	–		0	0	42	12
Barito Putera	2018	Liga 1	23	2	0	0	–		3	1	26	3
Barito Putera	2019	Liga 1	12	1	0	0	–		0	0	12	1
Barito Putera	Total		35	3	0	0	–		3	1	38	4
Persela Lamongan	2020	Liga 1	3	1	0	0	–		0	0	3	1
Persebaya Surabaya	2021–22	Liga 1	32	0	0	0	–		5 (Note: Appearances in Menpora Cup)	1	37	1
RANS Nusantara	2022–23	Liga 1	34	0	0	0	–		4	0	38	0
Dewa United	2023–24	Liga 1	24	0	0	0	–		0	0	24	0
Dewa United	2024–25	Liga 1	18	0	0	0	–		0	0	18	0
Dewa United	2025–26	Super League	5	0	0	0	3 (Note: Appearances in AFC Challenge League)	0	0	0	8	0
Dewa United	2026–27	Super League	5	0	0	0	–		0	0	5	0
Career total			197	16	0	0	3	0	12	2	212	18
