= Lotra Widiyanto =

Indonesian footballer (born 2006)

Personal information
- Full name: Givary Lotra Widiyanto
- Date of birth: 26 April 2006 (age 20)
- Place of birth: Lumajang, Indonesia
- Height: 1.67 m (5 ft 6 in)
- Positions: Attacking midfielder; winger

Team information
- Current team: Dewa United Banten
- Number: 88

Youth career
- Dewa United U20

Senior career*
Years	Team	Apps	(Gls)
2024–	Dewa United Banten	0	(0)
2025–2026	→ MOI Kompong Dewa (loan)	13	(0)

International career^{‡}
2023	Indonesia U17	1	(0)
- * Club domestic league appearances and goals as of 12 April 2026 ‡ National team caps and goals as of 30 August 2023

Givary Lotra Widiyanto (born 26 April 2006), is an Indonesian professional footballer who plays as an attacking midfielder or winger for Super League club Dewa United Banten.

== Youth career ==
Widiyanto developed his early football capabilities in his home country, representing domestic youth development structures before joining the Dewa United youth academy. In early 2023, his performances earned him selection for the fifth season of the Garuda Select development squad trained in Europe, where he notably scored a goal against the youth team of Inter Milan during their overseas tour. During his time with the Dewa United U20 squad, he became one of the primary offensive contributors, registering 6 goals over the course of the U20 domestic campaign prior to mid-2025.

== Club career ==
In August 2025, Dewa United officially agreed to a single-season loan deal sending Widiyanto to the Cambodian top-flight league system to play for the newly restructured MOI Kompong Dewa for the 2025–26 Cambodian Premier League campaign. He moved alongside several Indonesian prospects, establishing his position under the foreign player quota regulations administered by the Football Federation of Cambodia. He made his professional debut for the club on 10 August 2025, in a 3–6 home lose over Angkor Tiger at the Visakha Stadium.

== International career ==
Widiyanto has represented Indonesia at the youth international level. He was called up to the Indonesia under-17 national team training camps ahead of their regional assignments and preparatory cycles.
