= Osmar Loss =

Brazilian professional football manager (born 1975)

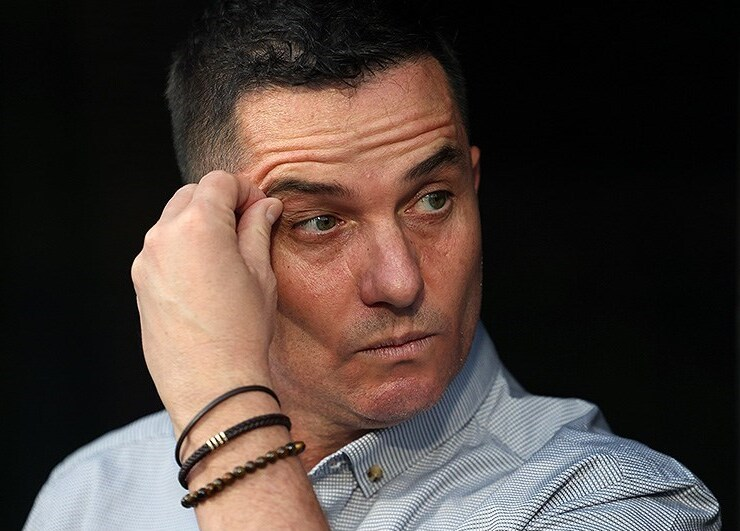
- Osmar with Persepolis in 2024

Personal information
- Full name: Osmar Loss Vieira
- Date of birth: 3 July 1975 (age 51)
- Place of birth: Passo Fundo, Brazil

Team information
- Current team: Dewa United Banten (head coach)

Managerial career
- Years: Team
- 1994–2009: Internacional (youth)
- 2010: Juventude
- 2010–2011: Internacional (youth)
- 2011: Fluminense (youth)
- 2011–2013: Internacional (youth)
- 2011: Internacional (interim)
- 2012: Internacional (interim)
- 2013–2015: Corinthians U20
- 2015: Bragantino
- 2015–2017: Corinthians U20
- 2017–2018: Corinthians (assistant)
- 2018: Corinthians
- 2019: Guarani
- 2019: Vitória
- 2020–2021: Internacional (assistant)
- 2021: Internacional (interim)
- 2022: Cianorte
- 2022–2024: Persepolis (assistant)
- 2024: Persepolis
- 2024–2025: Buriram United
- 2025–2026: Persepolis
- 2026–: Dewa United Banten

Osmar Loss Vieira (born 3 July 1975), or simply Osmar, is a Brazilian professional football manager. He is currently the head coach of the Indonesia Super League club, Dewa United Banten.

== Managerial career ==
Born in Passo Fundo, Rio Grande do Sul, Loss began his career with Internacional's youth setup in 1994. On 6 July 2009, he was appointed manager of the B-side.

On 23 December 2009, Loss was appointed manager of Juventude, being sacked the following 16 August. After another spell back at Inter and Fluminense's youth setups, he was named at the helm of the former's reserves for the second time.

On 18 July 2011, Loss was appointed interim manager of the main squad, replacing sacked Paulo Roberto Falcão; his reign lasted until 12 August 2011, and he returned to the B-team. On 20 November of the following year, he was again interim, in the place of dismissed Fernandão. He returned to his previous duties on 12 December, after the appointment of Dunga.

On 17 September 2013, after being demoted to the under-20 squad by Dunga, Loss joined Corinthians and was named manager of the under-20 side. On 17 April 2015, he was appointed at the helm of Bragantino, after a partnership with Corinthians was established; his reign lasted nearly three months, and he subsequently returned to Corinthians and its under-20 squad.

On 30 January 2017, after winning the year's Copa São Paulo de Futebol Júnior, Loss was appointed Fábio Carille's assistant at the main squad. On 22 May 2018, he replaced Carille as a first team manager.

On 5 September 2018, after a 2–1 defeat to Ceará, Loss was demoted back to his previous role as an assistant. On 28 November, he was named manager of Série B side Guarani for the upcoming season.

=== Persepolis ===
On 22 July 2022, Loss joined Persepolis as assistant coach. On 27 January 2024, Loss was named Persepolis head coach, replacing Iranian Yahya Golmohammadi.

== Managerial statistics ==
As of match played 20 November 2026

Managerial record by team and tenure
Team	Nat.	From	To	Record					Ref.
Team	Nat.	From	To	G	W	D	L	Win %	Ref.
Juventude	(Brazil)	23 December 2009	16 August 2010	22	2	9	11	9.09	
Internacional	(Brazil)	18 July 2011	12 August 2011	12	3	6	3	25.00	
Bragantino	(Brazil)	20 April 2015	9 July 2015	12	4	1	7	33.33	
Corinthians	(Brazil)	23 May 2018	5 September 2018	25	10	5	10	40.00	
Guarani	(Brazil)	28 November 2018	21 March 2019	13	4	2	7	30.77	
Vitoria	(Brazil)	21 May 2019	4 August 2019	10	2	2	6	20.00	
Internacional (caretaker)	(Brazil)	11 June 2021	22 June 2021	2	1	0	1	50.00	
Cianorte	(Brazil)	9 June 2022	25 July 2022	6	2	1	3	33.33	
Persepolis	(Iran)	27 January 2024	12 June 2024	17	13	3	1	76.47	
Buriram United	(Thailand)	26 June 2024	7 October 2025	72	48	15	9	66.67	
Persepolis	(Iran)	31 October 2025	30 June 2026	15	7	2	6	46.67	
Dewa United Banten	(Indonesia)	25 July 2026	Present	11	7	2	2	63.64	
Career Total				217	103	48	66	47.47	

== Honours ==
=== Manager ===
Persepolis

- Persian Gulf Pro League: 2023–24

Buriram United

- Thai League 1: 2024–25
- Thai FA Cup: 2024–25
- Thai League Cup: 2024–25
- ASEAN Club Championship: 2024–25

Individual

- Thai League 1 Coach of the Month: August 2024
- Thai League 1 Coach of the Year: 2024–25

==== Assistant Manager ====
Persepolis

- Persian Gulf Pro League: 2022–23
- Hazfi Cup: 2022–23
