= Brian Fatari =

Indonesian footballer

Personal information
- Full name: Brian Fatari
- Date of birth: 20 December 1999 (age 26)
- Place of birth: Sorong, Indonesia
- Height: 1.87 m (6 ft 2 in)
- Positions: Centre-back; defensive midfielder

Team information
- Current team: Dewa United
- Number: 14

Youth career
- 2018: Persipura Jayapura
- 2019: Persija Jakarta
- 2020: Persipura Jayapura

Senior career*
Years	Team	Apps	(Gls)
2020–2022	Persipura Jayapura	30	(2)
2023–	Dewa United	74	(1)

International career^{‡}
2026–	Indonesia	2	(0)
- * Club domestic league appearances and goals as of 31 October 2026 ‡ National team caps and goals as of 31 July 2026

Brian Fatari (born 20 December 1999) is an Indonesian professional footballer who plays as a centre-back or defensive midfielder for Super League club Dewa United and the Indonesia national team.

== Club career ==
=== Persipura Jayapura ===
He was signed for Persipura Jayapura to play in Liga 1 in the 2020 season. Brian Fatari made his first-team debut on 28 August 2021 as a substitute in a match against Persita Tangerang at the Pakansari Stadium, Cibinong.

=== Dewa United ===
Brian Fatari was signed for Dewa United to play in Liga 1 in the 2022–23 season. Brian made his debut on 14 January 2023 in a match against Persis Solo at the Indomilk Arena, Tangerang.

== Career statistics ==
=== Club ===
As of 31 October 2026

Club	Season	League			Cup		Continental		Other		Total	
Club	Season	Division	Apps	Goals	Apps	Goals	Apps	Goals	Apps	Goals	Apps	Goals
Persipura Jayapura	2020	Liga 1	0	0	0	0	–		0	0	0	0
Persipura Jayapura	2021–22	Liga 1	24	1	0	0	–		0	0	24	1
Persipura Jayapura	2022–23	Liga 2	6	1	0	0	–		0	0	6	1
Persipura Jayapura	Total		30	2	0	0	–		0	0	30	2
Dewa United	2022–23	Liga 1	12	0	0	0	–		0	0	12	0
Dewa United	2023–24	Liga 1	11	1	0	0	–		0	0	11	1
Dewa United	2024–25	Liga 1	20	0	0	0	–		0	0	20	0
Dewa United	2025–26	Super League	29	0	0	0	2 (Note: Appearances in AFC Challenge League)	0	0	0	31	0
Dewa United	2026–27	Super League	2	0	0	0	0	0	0	0	2	0
Career total			104	3	0	0	2	0	0	0	106	3

=== International ===
As of match played 31 July 2026

Appearances and goals by national team and year
National team	Year	Apps	Goals
Indonesia	2026	2	0
Total		2	0
