= Ko Myeong-seok =

South Korean footballer (born 1995)

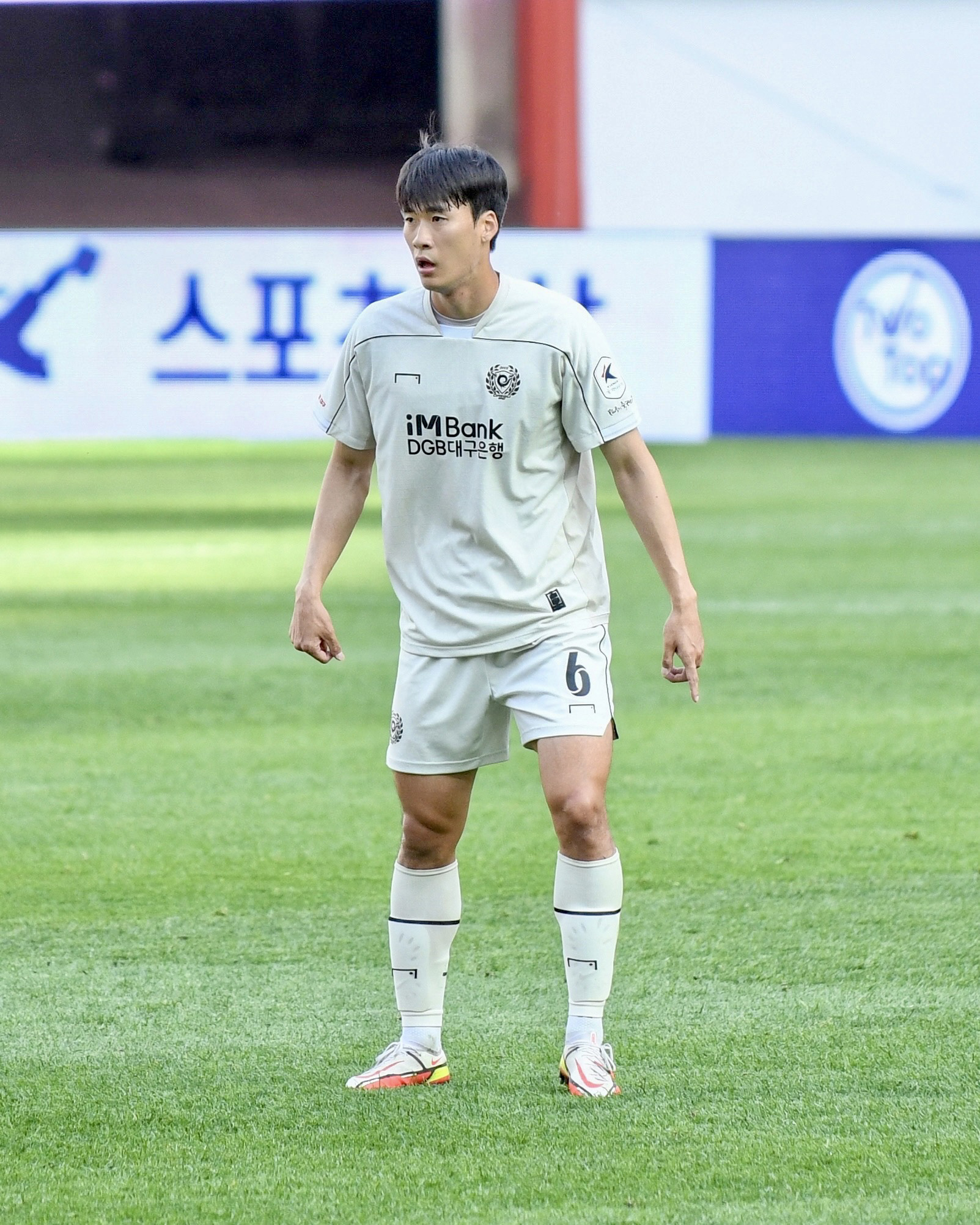
- Ko in 2024

Personal information
- Date of birth: 27 September 1995 (age 31)
- Place of birth: Seoul, South Korea
- Height: 1.89 m (6 ft 2 in)
- Position: Centre-back

Team information
- Current team: Dewa United Banten
- Number: 22

Senior career*
Years	Team	Apps	(Gls)
2017	Bucheon 1995	28	(2)
2018	Daejeon Hana Citizen	34	(1)
2019–2024	Suwon Samsung Bluewings	74	(4)
2020–2021	→ Gimcheon Sangmu (loan)	17	(0)
2024–2025	Daegu FC	33	(0)
2025–2026	Buriram United	22	(0)
2026–	Dewa United Banten	8	(0)

International career^{‡}
2014	South Korea U-20	0	(0)
2017–2018	South Korea U-23	3	(0)
- * Club domestic league appearances and goals as of 31 October 2026 ‡ National team caps and goals as of 11 December 2019

- Ko Myeong-seok
- Hangul: 고명석
- Hanja: 高明錫
- RR: Go Myeongseok
- MR: Ko Myŏngsŏk

Ko Myeong-seok (Korean: 고명석; born 27 September 1995) is a South Korean professional footballer who plays as a centre-back for Super League club Dewa United Banten.

== Career ==
For the 2018 season, Ko signed for South Korean second division side Daejeon Hana Citizen due to their head coach, South Korea international Ko Jong-soo.

Before the 2019 season, he signed for Suwon Samsung Bluewings in the South Korean top flight.

Before the 2024 season, he signed for Daegu FC in the South Korean top flight.

== Honours ==
Buriram United

- Thai League 1: 2024–25
- Thai FA Cup: 2024–25
- Thai League Cup: 2024–25
- ASEAN Club Championship: 2024–25
