= Alta Ballah =

Indonesian footballer (born 2000)

Personal information
- Full name: Altalariq Erfa Aqsal Ballah
- Date of birth: 30 December 2000 (age 25)
- Place of birth: Tangerang, Indonesia
- Height: 1.75 m (5 ft 9 in)
- Position: Left-back

Team information
- Current team: Dewa United Banten
- Number: 37

Youth career
- 2018: Borneo
- 2019: Persib Bandung
- 2020: Persita Tangerang

Senior career*
Years	Team	Apps	(Gls)
2021–2022	Persita Tangerang	20	(0)
2022–2023	Persebaya Surabaya	31	(2)
2023–	Dewa United Banten	93	(1)
- * Club domestic league appearances and goals as of 6 November 2026

Altalariq Erfa Aqsal Ballah (born 30 December 2000) is an Indonesian professional footballer who plays as a left-back for Super League club Dewa United Banten.

== Club career ==
=== Persita Tangerang ===
He was signed for Persita Tangerang to play in Liga 1 in the 2021 season. Ballah made his first-team debut on 28 August 2021 as a substitute in a match against Persipura Jayapura at the Pakansari Stadium, Cibinong.

=== Persebaya Surabaya ===
Ballah was signed for Persebaya Surabaya to play in Liga 1 in the 2022–23 season. He made his league debut on 7 August 2022 in a match against Bhayangkara at the Wibawa Mukti Stadium, Cikarang. In a match against PSS Sleman on 27 August 2022, he played 90 minutes for the first time in a 1–0 away win in gameweek 4, although pulled-out replaced by Arief Catur in extra time.

On 3 February 2023, he scored his first goal for Persebaya, as they won 3–2 against Borneo Samarinda. On 8 April, Ballah scored his second league goal for the club, scoring in the 49th minute in Persebaya's 3–3 draw over Persis Solo.

== Career statistics ==
=== Club ===
As of 6 November 2026

Club	Season	League			Cup		Continental		Other		Total	
Club	Season	Division	Apps	Goals	Apps	Goals	Apps	Goals	Apps	Goals	Apps	Goals
Persita Tangerang	2021–22	Liga 1	20	0	0	0	–		3 (Note: Appearances in Menpora Cup)	0	23	0
Persebaya Surabaya	2022–23	Liga 1	31	2	0	0	–		3 (Note: Appearances in Indonesia President's Cup)	0	34	2
Dewa United	2023–24	Liga 1	29	0	0	0	–		0	0	29	0
Dewa United	2024–25	Liga 1	32	1	0	0	–		0	0	32	1
Dewa United	2025–26	Super League	23	0	0	0	4 (Note: Appearances in AFC Challenge League)	0	0	0	27	0
Dewa United	2026–27	Super League	9	0	0	0	–		0	0	9	0
Career total			144	3	0	0	4	0	6	0	154	3

== Personal life ==
Altalariq is the son of Liberian former footballer Anthony Jomah Ballah and an Indonesian Mother.
