= Banten International Stadium =

Indonesian international stadium

Coordinates: 6.1992°S 106.1319°E

- Stadion Internasional Banten
- Interactive map of Banten International Stadium
- Location: Serang Regency, Banten, Indonesia
- Owner: Government of Banten
- Capacity: 30,000
- Surface: Zoysia matrella grass

Construction
- Groundbreaking: July 2020; 6 years ago
- Built: July 2020 – May 2022
- Opened: 9 May 2022; 4 years ago
- Cost: Rp 874,317 Billion ($59 million)
- Architect: PDW Architects
- Main contractor: PT PP.Tbk

Tenants
- Dewa United (2025–); Adhyaksa (2025–2026); Persita Tangerang (September–November 2026)

Banten International Stadium (Indonesian: Stadion Internasional Banten) is a multi-purpose stadium with a capacity of 30,000 seats in Pabuaran, Serang Regency, Banten, Indonesia, which was inaugurated on 9 May 2022. The stadium uses a unique design that features designs of Baduy, batik and bamboo motives. This stadium is part of the Banten Sports Center.
