= Pedro (footballer, born 1999) =

Brazilian footballer

Personal information
- Full name: Pedro Augusto Cabral Carvalho
- Date of birth: 26 March 1999 (age 27)
- Place of birth: Itabuna, Brazil
- Height: 1.85 m (6 ft 1 in)
- Position: Forward

Team information
- Current team: Dewa United Banten
- Number: 9

Youth career
- 2018–2019: América Mineiro

Senior career*
Years	Team	Apps	(Gls)
2019	América Mineiro	2	(0)
2020	Passo Fundo	2	(0)
2021	América-RJ	5	(3)
2021	Serra Macaense	0	(0)
2021	→ Paraná (loan)	8	(0)
2021–2022	Egnatia	27	(10)
2022	Serra Macaense	0	(0)
2023	Flamurtari	14	(3)
2023	Persikabo 1973	12	(3)
2024	Guabirá	20	(10)
2025–2026	Navbahor	23	(6)
2026	Guabirá	11	(6)
2026–	Dewa United Banten	3	(1)
- * Club domestic league appearances and goals as of 25 October 2026

Pedro Augusto Cabral Carvalho (born 26 March 1999), simply known as Pedro, is a Brazilian footballer who plays as a forward for Super League club Dewa United Banten.

== Career ==
Pedro came through the youth system at América Mineiro, featuring in the 2019 Copa São Paulo de Futebol Júnior, where he scored a hattrick in his second game. He made his senior club debut as a late substitute against Boa Esporte in Campeonato Mineiro on 24 February 2019. His debut in the domestic national league came on 1 May 2019 in Campeonato Brasileiro Série B as a late substitute against Botafogo-SP.
