= Nick Kuipers (footballer, born 1992) =

Dutch footballer

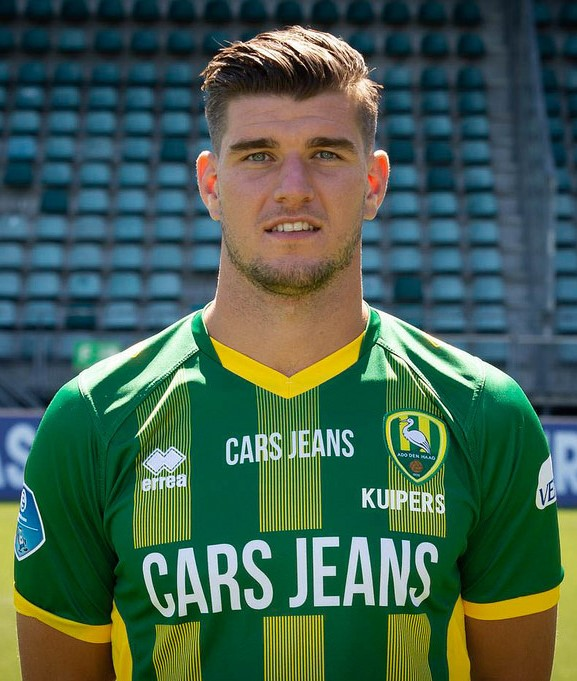
- Kuipers with ADO Den Haag

Personal information
- Full name: Nick Anna Maria Francois Kuipers
- Date of birth: 8 October 1992 (age 34)
- Place of birth: Maastricht, Netherlands
- Height: 1.93 m (6 ft 4 in)
- Position: Centre-back

Team information
- Current team: Dewa United
- Number: 2

Youth career
- RKVVL
- MVV Maastricht

Senior career*
Years	Team	Apps	(Gls)
2009–2017	MVV Maastricht	162	(5)
2017–2019	ADO Den Haag	18	(1)
2019	→ Emmen (loan)	10	(0)
2019–2025	Persib Bandung	141	(7)
2025–	Dewa United	36	(1)
- * Club domestic league appearances and goals as of 31 October 2026

Nick Anna Maria Francois Kuipers (born 8 October 1992) is a Dutch professional footballer who plays as a centre-back for Super League club Dewa United.

He has also played for Dutch clubs MVV Maastricht, Emmen and ADO Den Haag as well as Persib Bandung in Indonesia.

== Career ==
A defender, Kuipers started his career in his hometown with RKVVL before joining the youth team of MVV Maastricht. He was promoted to the first team ahead of the 2010–11 Eerste Divisie season and made his senior debut in a 2–2 league draw against Volendam on 13 August 2010.

== Honours ==
Persib Bandung

- Liga 1: 2023–24, 2024–25

Individual

- APPI Indonesian Football Award Best 11: 2021–22
