= Johnathan (footballer, born 1995) =

Brazilian footballer

Personal information
- Full name: Johnathan Carlos Pereira Souza
- Date of birth: 4 April 1995 (age 31)
- Place of birth: Goiânia, Brazil
- Height: 1.77 m (5 ft 10 in)
- Position: Right-back

Team information
- Current team: Dewa United
- Number: 4

Youth career
- 20??–2016: Goiás

Senior career*
Years	Team	Apps	(Gls)
2016–2017	Goiás	14	(0)
2017	→ Tupi (loan)	7	(0)
2018	Stal Kamianske	13	(1)
2018–2021	Botev Plovdiv	61	(2)
2021–2022	Beroe	19	(2)
2022–2025	CSKA 1948	53	(2)
2024–2025	CSKA 1948 II	5	(0)
2025–	Dewa United	21	(1)
- * Club domestic league appearances and goals as of 25 October 2026

Johnathan Carlos Pereira Souza (born 4 April 1995), or simply Johnathan, is a Brazilian professional footballer who plays as a right-back for Super League club Dewa United.

== Career ==
Johnathan is a product of the Goiás youth sportive system. After that, he played for some Brazilian football clubs, until in February 2018 signed a two and half years contract with the Ukrainian Premier League club Stal Kamianske. He joined Bulgarian club Botev Plovdiv in August 2018.
