= Edo Febriansah =

Indonesian footballer

Personal information
- Full name: Mohammad Edo Febriansah
- Date of birth: 25 July 1997 (age 29)
- Place of birth: Kediri, Indonesia
- Height: 1.78 m (5 ft 10 in)
- Positions: Left back; left winger

Team information
- Current team: Dewa United Banten
- Number: 97

Youth career
- 2014: Persis Solo
- 2015: PPLP Jateng
- 2016: PPLM Jateng

Senior career*
Years	Team	Apps	(Gls)
2017	PS Bengkulu	14	(1)
2018	Persiwa Wamena	20	(6)
2019	Persik Kediri	20	(1)
2020–2022	Persita Tangerang	25	(4)
2022–2023	RANS Nusantara	25	(5)
2023–2025	Persib Bandung	63	(3)
2025–	Dewa United Banten	31	(0)

International career
2016	Indonesia U19	3	(1)
2021–2024	Indonesia	16	(0)
Medal record
Men's football
Representing Indonesia
AFF Championship
Runner-up	2020 Singapore	Team
- * Club domestic league appearances and goals as of 22:30, 31 October 2026 (UTC)

Mohammad Edo Febriansah (born 25 July 1997) is an Indonesian professional footballer who plays for Super League club Dewa United Banten and the Indonesia national team. He plays mainly as a left back, but can also operate as a left winger.

== Club career ==
=== PS Bengkulu ===
He was signed for PS Bengkulu to play in Liga 2 in the 2017 season.

=== Persiwa Wamena ===
In 2018, Edo Febriansah signed a one-year contract with Indonesian Liga 2 club Persiwa Wamena. He made 20 league appearances and scored 6 goals for Persiwa Wamena.

=== Persik Kediri ===
In 2019, Edo signed a one-year contract with Indonesian Liga 2 club Persik Kediri. On 25 November 2019 Persik successfully won the 2019 Liga 2 Final and promoted to Liga 1, after defeated Persita Tangerang 3–2 at the Kapten I Wayan Dipta Stadium, Gianyar. He made 20 league appearances and scored 1 goal for Persik Kediri.

=== Persita Tangerang ===
He was signed for Persita Tangerang to play in Liga 1 in the 2020 season. Edo made his debut on 1 March 2020 in a match against Bali United. On 6 March 2020, Edo scored his first goal for Persita against PSM Makassar in the 59th minute at the Indomilk Arena, Tangerang. This season was suspended on 27 March 2020 due to the COVID-19 pandemic. The season was abandoned and was declared void on 20 January 2021.

On 24 September 2021, Edo scored his first goal of the season, scoring in the 84th minute, final result, Persita lose 1–2 over Bali United in the 2021–22 Liga 1. On 27 October 2021, he scored in a 2–2 draw over Arema.

=== RANS Nusantara ===
Edo was signed for RANS Nusantara to play in Liga 1 in the 2022–23 season. He made his league debut on 23 July 2022 in a match against PSIS Semarang at the Jatidiri Stadium, Semarang which ended in a 1–1 draw, also give assists a goal by Makan Konaté. Edo give another assists in a 3–3 draw over PSS Sleman six days later at Pakansari Stadium, Edo's low pass was finished by David Laly with a hard kick in the opponent's defense area. Edo scored his first league goals in a 1–2 win over Persebaya Surabaya, scoring a brace, on 15 September.

On 25 January 2023, Edo scored in a 4–4 draw over Bali United. He added his fourth goals of the season on 28 February against Persebaya in a 2–2 draw, he was also selected as man of the match in that match. And continued scored his fifth goal of the season in a 2–3 lose against Persis Solo on 10 March.

=== Persib Bandung ===
Edo was signed for Persib Bandung to play in Liga 1 in the 2023–24 season. He made his debut on 2 July 2023 in a match against Madura United at the Gelora Bandung Lautan Api Stadium, Bandung. On 6 June 2025, Edo officially left Persib Bandung.

=== Dewa United ===
On 29 June 2025, Edo officially signed with Dewa United.

== International career ==
In 2016, Edo represented the Indonesia U-19, in the 2016 AFF U-19 Youth Championship.

In November 2021, Indonesian coach, Shin Tae-yong sent Edo his first call up to the full national side, for the friendly matches in Turkey against Afghanistan and Myanmar. He made his official international debut for Indonesia national team on 25 November 2021, against Myanmar in a friendly match in Antalya, Turkey.

In November 2022, it was reported that Edo received a call-up from the Indonesia for a training camp, in preparation for the 2022 AFF Championship. He played the full 90 minutes in a 7–0 away win against Brunei on 26 December, give two assists to goal by Egy Maulana Vikri (59th minutes) and Yakob Sayuri (92nd minutes).

== Career statistics ==
=== Club ===
As of match played 31 October 2026

Club	Season	League			Cup		Continental		Other		Total	
Club	Season	Division	Apps	Goals	Apps	Goals	Apps	Goals	Apps	Goals	Apps	Goals
PS Bengkulu	2017	Liga 2	14	1	0	0	–		0	0	14	1
Persiwa Wamena	2018	Liga 2	20	6	0	0	–		0	0	20	6
Persik Kediri	2019	Liga 2	20	1	0	0	–		0	0	20	1
Persita Tangerang	2020	Liga 1	3	1	0	0	–		0	0	3	1
Persita Tangerang	2021–22	Liga 1	22	3	0	0	–		3 (Note: Appearances in Menpora Cup.)	0	25	3
RANS Nusantara	2022–23	Liga 1	25	5	0	0	–		3 (Note: Appearances in Indonesia President's Cup)	1	28	6
Persib Bandung	2023–24	Liga 1	32	2	0	0	–		0	0	32	2
Persib Bandung	2024–25	Liga 1	31	1	0	0	5 (Note: Appearances in AFC Champions League Two)	0	0	0	36	1
Dewa United	2025–26	Super League	25	0	0	0	3 (Note: Appearances in AFC Challenge League)	0	0	0	28	0
Dewa United	2026–27	Super League	6	0	0	0	0	0	0	0	6	0
Career total			197	20	0	0	8	0	6	1	211	21

=== International ===
As of match played 9 January 2024

Appearances and goals by national team and year
National team	Year	Apps	Goals
Indonesia	2021	4	0
Indonesia	2022	5	0
Indonesia	2023	4	0
Indonesia	2024	3	0
Total		16	0

== Honours ==
Persik Kediri

- Liga 3: 2018

Persik Kediri

- Liga 2: 2019

Persib Bandung

- Liga 1: 2023–24, 2024–25

Indonesia

- AFF Championship runner-up: 2020

Individual

- Liga 1 Goal of the Month: October/November 2024
