= Rangga Muslim =

Indonesian footballer

Personal information
- Full name: Rangga Muslim Perkasa
- Date of birth: 3 May 1994 (age 32)
- Place of birth: Bima, Indonesia
- Height: 1.66 m (5 ft 5 in)
- Position: Midfielder

Team information
- Current team: PSMS Medan
- Number: 15

Youth career
- 2013: Tunas Yogya

Senior career*
Years	Team	Apps	(Gls)
2014–2017	PSIM Yogyakarta	36	(8)
2017	Persebaya Surabaya	4	(0)
2018–2019	PSS Sleman	50	(4)
2020–2021	Bhayangkara	0	(0)
2021–2026	Dewa United	69	(3)
2026–	PSMS Medan	2	(0)
- * Club domestic league appearances and goals as of 11 October 2026

Rangga Muslim Perkasa (born 3 May 1994) is an Indonesian professional footballer who plays as a midfielder for Championship club PSMS Medan.

== Club career ==
=== Bhayangkara ===
He was signed for Bhayangkara to play in Liga 1 in the 2020 season. This season was suspended on 27 March 2020 due to the COVID-19 pandemic. The season was abandoned and was declared void on 20 January 2021.

=== Dewa United ===
In 2021, Rangga Muslim signed a contract with Indonesian Liga 2 club Dewa United. He made his league debut on 5 October against Perserang Serang at the Gelora Bung Karno Madya Stadium, Jakarta.

== Honours ==
=== Club ===
PSS Sleman

- Liga 2: 2018

Dewa United

- Liga 2 third place (play-offs): 2021
