= Alexis Messidoro =

Argentine footballer

Personal information
- Full name: Alexis Nahuel Messidoro
- Date of birth: 13 May 1997 (age 29)
- Place of birth: Buenos Aires, Argentina
- Height: 1.70 m (5 ft 7 in)
- Position: Midfielder

Team information
- Current team: Dewa United Banten
- Number: 28

Youth career
- Almagro
- 2010–2015: Boca Juniors

Senior career*
Years	Team	Apps	(Gls)
2015–2019	Boca Juniors	5	(1)
2017	→ Sport Boys (loan)	0	(0)
2017–2018	→ Cruzeiro (loan)	3	(0)
2018–2019	→ Talleres (loan)	2	(0)
2019	→ Cerro Largo (loan)	4	(1)
2020	Estudiantes de Mérida	5	(1)
2020–2021	Platense	3	(1)
2021–2022	Ierapetra	28	(10)
2022–2024	Persis Solo	65	(14)
2024–	Dewa United Banten	65	(13)
- * Club domestic league appearances and goals as of 31 October 2026

Alexis Nahuel Messidoro (born 13 May 1997) is an Argentine professional footballer who plays as a midfielder for Super League club Dewa United Banten.

== Career ==
Messidoro is a youth exponent from the Boca Juniors. On 12 April 2016, he made his first team debut in a league game against Aldosivi in a 4–1 home win. He started in the first eleven and scored his first goal after 54 minutes.

== Honours ==
=== Individual ===
- APPI Indonesian Football Award Best Midfielder: 2023–24
- APPI Indonesian Football Award Best XI: 2023–24, 2024–25
- Liga 1 Team of the Season: 2024–25
