= Dewa United Banten F.C. =

Association football team in Indonesia

Dewa United Banten
- Full name: Dewa United Banten Football Club
- Nickname: Banten Warriors
- Short name: DEW
- Founded: 11 March 2009; 17 years ago, as Martapura; 22 February 2021; 5 years ago, as Dewa United
- Ground: Banten International Stadium
- Capacity: 30,000; 15,000
- President: Tommy Hermawan Lo
- CEO: Ardian Satya Negara
- Head coach: Osmar Loss
- League: Super League
- 2025–26: Liga 1, 7th of 18
- Website: dewaunited.com
Home colours	Away colours	Third colours

Dewa United Banten Football Club is an Indonesian professional football club based in Banten, Serang. The club currently compete in the Super League, the top-flight of Indonesian football. They were promoted from Liga 2 after placing third in the 2021 season.

== History ==
=== Martapura (2009–2021) ===
The club was founded as Martapura Football Club in 2009. They became an official member of the Football Association of Indonesia on 11 March of the same year. Their first participation in Indonesian competitions was in the 2009–10 Liga Indonesia Third Division. They were promoted to the Liga Indonesia Second Division in 2011 after finishing in fifth place in the 2010–11 Liga Indonesia Third Division. Because of the dualism at the time, they started next season in 2012. They contested in the 2012 Liga Indonesia Second Division and were promoted to the Liga Indonesia First Division. Martapura, with mostly local players, was promoted in their first season after finishing second in the final round of the 2013 Liga Indonesia First Division.

Since the 2014 Liga Indonesia Premier Division, they used Demang Lehman Stadium to comply with PT Liga regulations.

=== Dewa United (2021–present) ===
On 22 February 2021, Martapura officially changed ownership after being acquired by Garibaldi Thohir, Rendra Soedjono and Kevin Hardiman who subsequently rebranded the club as Martapura Dewa United and relocated it to South Tangerang, Banten.

On 28 September 2021, Dewa United made their debut under its new identity 2021–22 Liga 2 in a 3–1 win against RANS Cilegon at the Gelora Bung Karno Madya Stadium. A weeks later, they had their second match in a 2–0 win against Perserang Serang. On 30 November 2021, they closed the match in the group stage of the 2021–22 Liga 2 in a 0–1 loss to Persekat Tegal, and qualified for the second round as Group B winner. On 23 December 2021, they qualified for the semi-finals of the 2021–22 Liga 2 as Group Y winners after their 0–1 win over PSMS Medan. Four days later in the semi final they lost 1–2 to Persis Solo. In the third place match on 30 December 2021, they defeated PSIM Yogyakarta 0–1, with a goal created in the last minute of the second half by Gufroni Al Maruf's goal. They promoted to Liga 1 in 2022 season.

Following an action at the PSSI Congress on 30 May 2022, the club officially removed Martapura from its name and became known as Dewa United. The club subsequently made its debut in Liga 1 during the 2022–23 season. Its first campaign in the top division proved difficult, as Dewa United finished 17th in the standings. Nevertheless, the club retained its place in the competition and continued to strengthen its squad ahead of subsequent seasons.

Dewa United improved during the 2023–24 Liga 1 season, finishing fifth with 54 points from 34 matches. The club recorded 14 wins, 12 draws and eight defeats, representing a significant improvement on its debut campaign. Its progress continued in the following season, when Dewa United emerged as one of the leading teams in the competition under Dutch head coach Jan Olde Riekerink. The club finished as runners-up in the 2024–25 Liga 1 season, collecting 61 points from 34 matches with 17 wins, 10 draws and seven defeats. Dewa United scored 65 goals and conceded 33, recording one of the strongest attacking and defensive records in the league. The second-place finish represented the club's best league result since its establishment under the Dewa United identity and qualified it for the 2025–26 AFC Challenge League, marking its first appearance in an Asian club competition. Brazilian forward Alex Martins went on to win the league top scorer award scoring 26 goals in 25 appearances.

Dewa United also strengthened its association with Banten during this period adding Banten in its club official name as Dewa United Banten. On 23 February 2025, the club held an event titled Banten Warriors at Banten International Stadium in Serang, declaring its intention to represent Banten in Indonesia's top division. The event was attended by local supporters and marked a further step in the club's efforts to establish a regional identity beyond its base in South Tangerang. In August 2025, an agreement between the provincial government and the club formally established Banten International Stadium as its home ground for the 2025–26 season, strengthening its connection with the province.

In the 2025–26 season, Dewa United made its continental debut in the AFC Challenge League. The club hosted its group-stage matches in Indonesia, competing against Cambodian club Phnom Penh Crown, Taiwanese club Tainan City and Myamnar club Shan United. Dewa United advanced from the group stage and reached the quarter-finals, where it faced Philippines club Manila Digger. After losing the first leg 1–0 away from home, Dewa United drew 2–2 in the return leg, resulting in a 3–2 aggregate defeat and elimination from the competition. In the domestic league, the club finished seventh in the 2025–26 season, continuing its presence in the upper half of the Indonesian top division.

== Team image ==
=== Mascot ===
Golden horn unicorn is the mascot of Dewa United, a mythological animal that lives in Banten. Marco Polo had stopped to the islands of Sumatra and Java. He claimed to have seen a unicorn or a mythological creature in the form of a one-horned horse. The philosophy of the unicorn is that the animal represents purity, healing, joy, courage, and unmatched strength. Dewa United's nickname is Deluxe Unicorn. Anak Dewa are the club's main supporters.

== Stadium ==
Dewa United play their home matches at Banten International Stadium located in Serang, Banten. Owned by the provincial government of Banten, the stadium has a seating capacity of approximately 30,000 spectators and was officially inaugurated on 9 May 2022. It was constructed to provide a major sporting venue for the province and features a football pitch surrounded by spectator stands and an athletics track. The stadium's design incorporates elements inspired by local cultural traditions, including Baduy motifs, batik patterns and bamboo-inspired architecture.

Dewa United first usage of the stadium was in February 2025 as part of the club's efforts to establish a stronger connection with the province of Banten. On 23 February 2025, the club held the Banten Warriors declaration event at the stadium, expressing its intention to represent the province in Indonesian football. In August 2025, Dewa United reached an agreement with the Banten provincial government to use the venue as its home ground, beginning with the 2025–26 season. The move marked a significant change in the club's home-ground arrangements and established Banten International Stadium as its principal venue for domestic league matches.

== Kit suppliers and shirt sponsors ==
Period	Kit manufacturer
2021–2023	(Indonesia) Mills
2023–present	(Indonesia) DRX Wear

== Players ==
=== Current squad ===
As of September 2026

Note: Flags indicate national team as defined under FIFA eligibility rules; some limited exceptions apply. Players may hold more than one non-FIFA nationality.

No.	Pos.	Nation	Player
1	GK	IDN	Muhammad Riyandi
2	DF	NED	Nick Kuipers
4	DF	BRA	Johnathan
5	MF	BRA	Jean Mangabeira
6	MF	IDN	Ivar Jenner
7	FW	BRA	Denílson
9	FW	BRA	Pedro Augusto
10	FW	IDN	Egy Maulana Vikri (vice-captain)
11	MF	IDN	Taisei Marukawa
14	DF	IDN	Brian Fatari
17	DF	JAM	Damion Lowe
19	MF	IDN	Ricky Kambuaya (captain)
20	GK	IDN	Fais Iqbal
21	DF	IDN	Reyvan Rezqi
22	DF	KOR	Ko Myeong-seok
23	DF	IDN	Ady Setiawan

No.	Pos.	Nation	Player
25	DF	IDN	Alfharezzi Buffon (on loan from Garudayaksa)
26	MF	IDN	Farhan Saviola
27	FW	IDN	Rafael Struick
28	MF	ARG	Alexis Messidoro
30	DF	IDN	Surya Yudha
37	DF	IDN	Alta Ballah (3rd captain)
38	MF	IDN	Fajar Pratama
50	DF	IDN	Jagat Gumelar
63	MF	IDN	Ripal Wahyudi
77	FW	MAR	Noah Sadaoui
79	MF	IDN	Syafiruddin Rasya
88	MF	IDN	Lotra Widiyanto
90	FW	IDN	Nofalio Ardanan
92	GK	NED	Sonny Stevens
97	DF	IDN	Edo Febriansah
99	GK	IDN	Sheva Sanggasi

=== Out on loan ===
Note: Flags indicate national team as defined under FIFA eligibility rules; some limited exceptions apply. Players may hold more than one non-FIFA nationality.

No.	Pos.	Nation	Player
—	GK	IDN	Dafa Al Gasemi (at Persikad Depok)
—	FW	BRA	Carlos Iury (at Garudayaksa)

== Management and staff ==
Position	Name
President	(Indonesia) Tommy Hermawan Lo
CEO	(Indonesia) Ardian Satya Negara
Team manager	(Indonesia) Judo Iswantoro
Head coach	(Brazil) Osmar Loss
Assistant head coach	(Brazil) Rafael Goncalves
Assistant coach	(Indonesia) Bayu Eka Sari
Assistant coach	(Indonesia) Firman Utina
Goalkeeper coach	(Netherlands) Frank Kooiman
Physical coach	(Brazil) Marcio Faria Correa
Assistant physical coach	(Indonesia) Hendra Pratama
Video Analyst	(Brazil) Uendell Macedo Silva
Video Analyst	(Indonesia) Arya Luthfy

== Honours ==
- Liga 1
  - Runners-up (1): 2024–25
- Indonesia Soccer Championship B/Liga 2
  - Third place (1): 2021
  - Fourth place (2): 2016, 2017

== Award winners ==
=== Domestic ===
- League Golden Boot
  - (Brazil) Alex Martins (2024–25)
- Team of the Season
  - (Indonesia) Egy Maulana Vikri (2024–25)
  - (Argentina) Alexis Messidoro (2024–25)
  - (Brazil) Alex Martins (2024–25)

== Notable players ==
=== International capped players ===
As of 2026–27 season.

AFC/OFC.: (Lebanon) Majed Osman; (Malaysia) Junior Eldstål; (Philippines) OJ Porteria; (South Korea) Ko Myeong-seok	CAF.: (Morocco) Noah Sadaoui	UEFA.: (Greece) Dimitris Kolovos; (Netherlands) Sonny Stevens; (North Macedonia) Risto Mitrevski	CONMEBOL/ CONCACAF.: (Brazil) Jajá; (Jamaica) Damion Lowe

== Managerial history ==
Manager	Period	Achievements
(Indonesia) Frans Sinatra Huwae	2014–2021	
(Indonesia) Kas Hartadi	2021–2022	
(Indonesia) Nil Maizar	2022	
(Netherlands) Jan Olde Riekerink	2023–2026	
(Brazil) Osmar Loss	2026–present	

== Season by season record ==
=== As Martapura ===
Season	League/Division	Tms.	Pos.	Piala Indonesia	ACLE	ACL 2	ACGL	ACC
2009–10	Third Division			–	–	–	–	–
2010–11	Third Division		2 in Group C (Fourth round)	–	–	–	–	–
2012	Second Division	100		–	–	–	–	–
2013	First Division	77	2 in Group XVIII (Third round)	–	–	–	–	–
2014	Premier Division	60	Semi-finalist	–	–	–	–	–
2015	Premier Division	55	did not finish	–	–	–	–	–
2016	ISC B	50	4	–	–	–	–	–
2017	Liga 2	61	4	–	–	–	–	–
2018	Liga 2	24	5 in East region	Second round	–	–	–	–
2019	Liga 2	23	4 in Group Y (Second round)	Second round	–	–	–	–
2020	Liga 2	24	did not finish	–	–	–	–	–

=== As Dewa United ===
Season	League/Division	Tms.	Pos.	Piala Indonesia	I-League Cup	ACLE	ACL 2	ACGL	ACC
2021–22	Liga 2	24	3	–	–	–	–	–	–
2022–23	Liga 1	18	17	–	–	–	–	–	–
2023–24	Liga 1	18	5	–	–	–	–	–	–
2024–25	Liga 1	18	2	–	–	–	–	–	–
2025–26	Super League	18	7	–	–	–	–	Quarter-finals	–
2026–27	Super League	18	TBD	–	TBD	–	–	–	–

== Performance in AFC competitions ==
Season	Competition	Round	Nat	Club	Home	Away	Aggregate
2025–26	AFC Challenge League	Group stage	(Cambodia)	Phnom Penh Crown	1–1		
2025–26	AFC Challenge League	Group stage	(Chinese Taipei)	Tainan City	4–0		
2025–26	AFC Challenge League	Group stage	(Myanmar)	Shan United	4–1		
2025–26	AFC Challenge League	Quarter-finals	(Philippines)	Manila Digger	2–2	0–1	2–3

== See also ==
- Dewa United Banten BC, the club's basketball division
- Dewa United Banten Women, the club's football women division
