= Taisei Marukawa =

Japanese footballer

Personal information
- Full name: Taisei Marukawa
- Date of birth: 30 January 1997 (age 29)
- Place of birth: Higashihiroshima, Japan
- Height: 1.69 m (5 ft 7 in)
- Position: Winger

Team information
- Current team: Dewa United Banten
- Number: 11

Youth career
- KELT FC
- 2012–2014: Hiroshima Minami High School

College career
Years	Team	Apps	(Gls)
2015–2018	Chuo University		

Senior career*
Years	Team	Apps	(Gls)
2019–2020	Senglea Athletic	26	(3)
2020	Valletta	8	(2)
2021	Noah Jurmala	0	(0)
2021–2022	Persebaya Surabaya	32	(17)
2022–2024	PSIS Semarang	63	(11)
2024–	Dewa United Banten	70	(10)
- * Club domestic league appearances and goals as of 6 November 2026

Taisei Marukawa (丸川 太誠, Marukawa Taisei; born 30 January 1997) is a Japanese professional footballer who plays as a winger for Super League club Dewa United Banten.

== Club career ==
=== Early career ===
Marukawa started his career when he was in high school by joining Hiroshima Minami High School. Then he joined Chuo University from 2016 to 2019.

=== Senglea Athletic ===
Before the second half of 2019–20, Marukawa moved to Malta. He signed one-year contract with Maltese Premier League club Senglea Athletic. He made his debut on 1 February, as a starter in a 1–2 win to Balzan. On 6 April, Marukawa scored his first goal for Senglea Athletic in a 2–2 draw over Ħamrun Spartans at the Hibernians Stadium.

=== Valletta ===
On 26 August 2020, Marukawa signed with Valletta. He made his league debut for Valletta on 21 September 2020 in a 4–2 league win against Birkirkara. and scored his first goal for Valletta in a 1–1 draw over Hibernians at the National Stadium, Ta' Qali.

=== Noah Jurmala ===
On 29 January 2021, Marukawa moved to Latvia. He signed one-year contract with Latvian Higher League club Noah Jurmala.

=== Persebaya Surabaya ===
In 2021, he signed for Indonesian club Persebaya. On 11 September 2021, Marukawa debuted for Persebaya during a 3–1 win over Persikabo 1973.

On 29 September 2021, Marukawa scored his first league goal for Persebaya with scored a brace in 2021-22 Liga 1, earning them a 1–3 victory over PSS Sleman. On 26 October 2021, Marukawa scored his goal for Persebaya in a match against Persija Jakarta in the 25th minute, playing at the Manahan Stadium, Persebaya was able to steal the full three points after beating Persija with a score of 1–0. This goal became Persebaya's only winning goal and managed to rank 5th in the standings.

=== PSIS Semarang ===
On 1 April 2022, Taisei Marukawa moved to PSIS Semarang for the 2022–23 Liga 1. In August 2023, with a market value of 6.08 billion rupiah, he's the most expensive player at PSIS Semarang.

Marukawa made his PSIS Semarang debut in a pre-season friendly against PSM Makassar on 28 May 2022. On 23 July 2022, Marukawa made his league debut by starting in a 1–1 draw against RANS Nusantara. And he also scored his first goal for the team, he scored in the 75th minute from the penalty at the Jatidiri Stadium, Semarang.

On 23 March 2023, Taisei Marukawa's contract was extended by PSIS management for the next two seasons.

== Honours ==
Individual

- Liga 1 Player of the Month: October 2021, December 2021
- Liga 1 Best Player: 2021–22
- Liga 1 Team of the Season: 2021–22
- APPI Indonesian Football Award Best 11: 2021–22
- APPI Indonesian Football Award Best Forward: 2021–22
- APPI Indonesian Football Award Best Footballer: 2021–22
