= 2026–27 Persib Bandung season =

Persib Bandung
2026–27 season
- Owner: PT Persib Bandung Bermartabat
- CEO: Glenn Sugita
- Head coach: Igor Tolić
- Stadium: Gelora Bandung Lautan Api Stadium
- Super League: 4th
- AFC Champions League Two: Group stage
- League Cup: Quarterfinals
- ASEAN Club Championship: Group stage
Home colours	Away colours	Third colours

The 2026–27 season is the 67th season in the history of Persib Bandung, and the club's 30th consecutive season in the top-flight of Indonesian football since it became fully professional. In addition to the domestic league, Persib are also participating in the AFC Champions League Two, the League Cup, and the ASEAN Club Championship.

This is Persib's first season under Igor Tolić as the head coach, after Bojan Hodak stepped down from the position at the end of the 2025–26 season.

The season covers the period from 1 July 2026 to 30 June 2027.

== Squad ==
As of 8 September 2026

Squad No.	Name	Nationality	Date of birth (age)	Previous club	Contract since	Contract end
Goalkeepers
14	Teja Paku Alam	(Indonesia)	14 September 1994 (age 32)	(Indonesia) Semen Padang	2020	2027
60	Rhaka Syafaka	(Indonesia)	11 February 2008 (age 18)	Youth Team	2025	
81	Fitrah Maulana	(Indonesia)	24 May 2006 (age 20)	Youth Team	2025	
Defenders
3	Gabriel Mutombo	(France)	19 January 1996 (age 30)	(Thailand) Ratchaburi	2026	2027
4	Júlio César	(Brazil)	21 March 1995 (age 31)	(Thailand) Chiangrai United	2025	2027
5	Kakang Rudianto	(Indonesia)	2 February 2003 (age 23)	Youth Team	2020	2029
6	Sandy Walsh	(Indonesia)	14 March 1995 (age 31)	(Thailand) Buriram United	2026	2029
22	Danijel Lončar	(Croatia)	26 June 1997 (age 29)	(Poland) Pogoń Szczecin	2026	2028
48	Patricio Matricardi	(Argentina)	7 January 1994 (age 32)	(Romania) Botoșani	2025	2028
66	Kevin Pasha	(Indonesia)	15 January 2007 (age 19)	Youth Team	2025	
Midfielders
2	Eliano Reijnders	(Indonesia)	23 October 2000 (age 26)	(Netherlands) PEC Zwolle	2025	2027
7	Beckham Putra	(Indonesia)	29 October 2001 (age 25)	Youth Team	2019	2028
8	Luciano Guaycochea	(Argentina)	24 April 1992 (age 34)	(Malaysia) Perak	2025	2027
11	Dedi Kusnandar	(Indonesia)	23 July 1991 (age 35)	(Indonesia) Bhayangkara Presisi	2017	2027
13	Febri Hariyadi	(Indonesia)	19 February 1996 (age 30)	(Indonesia) Persis Solo	2016	2026
17	Gakuto Notsuda	(Japan)	6 June 1994 (age 32)	(Thailand) BG Pathum United	2026	2027
18	Adam Alis	(Indonesia)	19 December 1993 (age 32)	(Indonesia) Borneo Samarinda	2024	2027
19	Nazriel Alfaro	(Indonesia)	1 February 2008 (age 18)	Youth Team	2025	
23	Marc Klok	(Indonesia)	20 April 1993 (age 33)	(Indonesia) Persija Jakarta	2021	2027
30	Rafi Rasyiq	(Indonesia)	30 November 2008 (age 17)	Youth Team	2026	2029
33	Thom Haye	(Indonesia)	9 February 1995 (age 31)	(Netherlands) Almere City	2025	2027
36	Athaya Zahran	(Indonesia)	22 January 2006 (age 20)	Youth Team	2025	
40	Ikhwan Tanamal	(Indonesia)	28 December 2003 (age 22)	(Indonesia) Persis Solo	2025	2028
97	Berguinho	(Brazil)	18 February 1997 (age 29)	(Indonesia) Borneo Samarinda	2025	2027
Forwards
9	Luka Menalo	(Bosnia and Herzegovina)	22 July 1996 (age 30)	(Bosnia and Herzegovina) Sarajevo	2026	2027
10	Mariano Peralta	(Argentina)	20 February 1998 (age 28)	(Indonesia) Borneo Samarinda	2026	2028
77	Ragnar Oratmangoen	(Indonesia)	21 January 1998 (age 28)	(Belgium) Dender	2026	2029
94	Uilliam Barros	(Brazil)	11 October 1994 (age 32)	(Kuwait) Al-Fahaheel	2025	2028
99	Balša Sekulić	(Montenegro)	10 June 1998 (age 28)	(Montenegro) Mornar	2026	2028
Players loaned out during season
29	Al Hamra Hehanussa	(Indonesia)	1 July 1999 (age 27)	(Indonesia) Persik Kediri	2025	2027
12	Henhen Herdiana	(Indonesia)	10 September 1995 (age 31)	(Indonesia) Persik Kediri	2017	2027
71	Adzikry Fadlillah	(Indonesia)	26 February 2003 (age 23)	(Indonesia) Persijap Jepara	2024	
44	Dion Markx	(Indonesia)	29 June 2005 (age 21)	(Netherlands) TOP Oss	2026	2028
98	Ramon Tanque	(Brazil)	10 October 1998 (age 28)	(Cambodia) Visakha	2025	2028
21	Faris Abdul Hafizh	(Indonesia)	21 July 2003 (age 23)	(Indonesia) Persikad Depok		
67	Saddil Ramdani	(Indonesia)	2 January 1999 (age 27)	(Malaysia) Sabah	2025	2028
Players transferred out during season

== Coaching staff ==
As of 25 August 2026

At the end of May 2026, following the conclusion of the 2025-26 Persib Bandung season, Bojan Hodak stepped down as head coach of Persib Bandung and transitioned into an executive advisory role as Shareholder Group Technical Advisor. In this strategic capacity, Hodak will oversee long-term sporting strategy, player recruitment policy, and overall football development across the club's board level.

To ensure continuity and build upon the established tactical foundation, assistant coach Igor Tolić was promoted to head coach of Persib Bandung on 25 May 2026.

Position	Name
Technical advisor	(Croatia) Bojan Hodak
Head of scouting	(Egypt) Ahmed El Wardani
Head coach	(Croatia) Igor Tolić
Assistant coach	(Croatia) Zlatko Runje (Indonesia) Achmad Jufriyanto
Goalkeeping coach	(Croatia) Mario Jozić (Indonesia) I Made Wirawan
Fitness coach	(Croatia) Karlo Reinholz (Indonesia) Yaya Sunarya
Team operation	(Indonesia) Irfan Suryadireja
Doctor	(Indonesia) Wira Prasetya
Physioterapist	(Indonesia) Benidektus Adi Prianto (Brazil) Geraldo Santos
Masseur	(Indonesia) Tatang Sutisna (Indonesia) Iyang Maulana
General secretary	(Indonesia) Yudiana
Analyst	(Indonesia) Pandu Satiagraha Effendi (Indonesia) Atreeyu Andrey Pamungkas (Indonesia) Gunawan Mochamad Natsir
Kit man	(Indonesia) Ujang Suparman (Indonesia) Heri Rudiana (Indonesia) Fikri Apriansyah
Team bus driver	(Indonesia) Wawan Gunawan
Technical liaison	(Indonesia) Aunurrahman
Media	(Indonesia) Muhammad Jatnika Sadili (Indonesia) Fajar Rahman
Team secretary	(Indonesia) Mayang Alya Putri Rizkiazahra

== Transfers and contracts ==
Starting from 29 May 2026, Persib were handed a player registration ban by FIFA for an indefinite period of time due to a contract dispute with former player Daisuke Sato. The CAS ruled Persib should pay Rp2.7 billion plus a five percent interest to Sato to lift the sanction. On 22 July 2026, the ban was officially lifted.

On 10 August 2026, Persib were handed a player registration ban by FIFA for 3 registration periods due to a contract dispute with former manager Robert Alberts. The following day, on 11 August 2026, the ban was lifted permanently.

=== In ===
Pre-season

Date	Position	Player	From	Fee	Ref
Permanent transfer
31 May 2026	DF	(Indonesia) Zalnando	(Indonesia) Persita Tangerang	End of loan	
31 May 2026	DF	(Indonesia) Henhen Herdiana	(Indonesia) Persik Kediri	End of loan	
31 May 2026	DF	(Indonesia) Al Hamra Hehanussa	(Indonesia) Persik Kediri	End of loan	
31 May 2026	DF	(Indonesia) Rezaldi Hehanussa	(Indonesia) Persik Kediri	End of loan	
31 May 2026	MF	(Indonesia) Febri Hariyadi	(Indonesia) Persis Solo	End of loan	
31 May 2026	MF	(Indonesia) Adzikry Fadlillah	(Indonesia) Persijap Jepara	End of loan	
31 May 2026	MF	(Indonesia) Ikhwan Tanamal	(Indonesia) Persis Solo	End of loan	
31 May 2026	FW	(Indonesia) Dimas Drajad	(Indonesia) Malut United	End of loan	
31 May 2026	FW	(Indonesia) Ferdiansyah Cecep	(Indonesia) Semen Padang	End of loan	
29 June 2026	DF	(France) Gabriel Mutombo	(Thailand) Ratchaburi	Free transfer	
2 July 2026	DF	(Bosnia and Herzegovina) Luka Menalo	(Bosnia and Herzegovina) Sarajevo	Free transfer	
2 July 2026	DF	(Indonesia) Sandy Walsh	(Thailand) Buriram United	Undisclosed	
4 July 2026	MF	(Japan) Gakuto Notsuda	(Thailand) BG Pathum United	Free transfer	
4 July 2026	FW	(Indonesia) Ragnar Oratmangoen	(Belgium) Dender	Free transfer	
7 July 2026	FW	(Montenegro) Balša Sekulić	(Montenegro) Mornar	Free transfer	
19 July 2026	FW	(Argentina) Mariano Peralta	(Indonesia) Borneo Samarinda	Free transfer	
8 August 2026	DF	(Croatia) Danijel Lončar	(Poland) Pogoń Szczecin	Free transfer	

=== Out ===
Pre-season

Date	Position	Player	To	Fee	Ref
Permanent transfer
3 June 2026	DF	(France) Layvin Kurzawa	Free agent	Free	
19 June 2026	DF	(Italy) Federico Barba	(Italy) Palermo	Free	
22 June 2026	FW	(Spain) Sergio Castel	(Indonesia) Persik Kediri	Free	
23 June 2026	DF	(Indonesia) Alfeandra Dewangga	(Indonesia) Arema	Undisclosed	
24 June 2026	GK	(Wales) Adam Przybek	(Cambodia) Kirivong Sok Sen Chey	Free	
25 June 2026	DF	(Indonesia) Robi Darwis	(Indonesia) Arema	Free	
28 June 2026	DF	(Indonesia) Rezaldi Hehanussa	(Indonesia) Semen Padang	Free	
28 June 2026	DF	(Indonesia) Zalnando	(Indonesia) Persita Tangerang	Free	
6 July 2026	FW	(France) Andrew Jung	(Vietnam) Hanoi	Undisclosed	
15 July 2026	FW	(Indonesia) Dimas Drajad	(Indonesia) PSS Sleman	Free	
16 July 2026	DF	(Iraq) Frans Putros	(Vietnam) Cong An Hanoi	Free	
22 July 2026	FW	(Indonesia) Ferdiansyah Cecep	(Indonesia) PSGC Ciamis	Free	
Loan transfer
27 June 2026	DF	(Indonesia) Zulkifli Lukmansyah	(Indonesia) Semen Padang	Season loan	
11 August 2026	DF	(Indonesia) Al Hamra Hehanussa	(Indonesia) Garudayaksa	Season loan	
13 August 2026	DF	(Indonesia) Henhen Herdiana	(Indonesia) PSM Makassar	Season loan	
13 August 2026	MF	(Indonesia) Adzikry Fadlillah	(Indonesia) Persijap Jepara	Season loan	
30 August 2026	DF	(Indonesia) Dion Markx	(Indonesia) Persita Tangerang	Season loan	
31 August 2026	FW	(Brazil) Ramon Tanque	(India) Chennaiyin	Season loan	
3 September 2026	DF	(Indonesia) Faris Abdul Hafizh	(Indonesia) PSGC Ciamis	Season loan	
8 September 2026	MF	(Indonesia) Saddil Ramdani	(Indonesia) Persebaya Surabaya	Season loan	
25 September 2026	DF	(Indonesia) Kevin Pasha	(Indonesia) PSGC Ciamis	Season loan	
25 September 2026	MF	(Indonesia) Athaya Zahran	(Indonesia) PSGC Ciamis	Season loan	

=== New contracts ===
Date	Position	Player	Until	Ref
16 July 2026	DF	(Brazil) Júlio César	June 2027	
17 July 2026	DF	(Argentina) Patricio Matricardi	June 2028	
17 July 2026	FW	(Brazil) Uilliam Barros	June 2028	
17 July 2026	FW	(Brazil) Ramon Tanque	June 2028	
18 July 2026	DF	(Indonesia) Kakang Rudianto	June 2029	
24 July 2026	MF	(Indonesia) Ikhwan Tanamal	June 2028	
26 July 2026	MF	(Indonesia) Rafi Rasyiq	June 2029	

== Pre-season and friendlies ==
On 7 July 2026, it was announced that Persib would take part in the pre-season tournament 2026 Piala Presiden. The group stage took place on Si Jalak Harupat Stadium in Bandung and Gelora Bung Tomo Stadium in Surabaya.

Persib were drawn in Group A for the tournament, along with Arema, DPMM, and Tampines Rovers. The tournament opened with Persib Bandung facing Arema on 25 July 2026 in Bandung.

Pos	Team	Pld	W	D	L	GF	GA	GD	Pts	Qualification
1	(Indonesia) Persib (H)	3	3	0	0	3	0	+3	9	Advance to the Semi-Final
2	(Indonesia) Arema	3	2	0	1	4	2	+2	6	Advance to the Semi-Final
3	(Singapore) Tampines Rovers	3	0	1	2	3	5	−2	1	
4	(Brunei) DPMM	3	0	1	2	2	5	−3	1	

Source: 2026 Piala Presiden
Rules for classification: Tiebreakers
(H) Hosts

Win Draw Loss Fixtures

25 July 2026 1	Persib	1–0	Arema	Bandung, Indonesia
19:30 UTC+7	Barros 24'; Mutombo (yellow card) 42'	Report	Careca (yellow card) 49'	Stadium: Si Jalak Harupat Stadium; Attendance: 23,756; Referee: Yudai Yamamoto (Japan)

28 July 2026 2	DPMM	0–1	Persib	Bandung, Indonesia
19:30 UTC+7		Report	Sekulić 74'	Stadium: Si Jalak Harupat Stadium; Attendance: 20,358; Referee: Candra (West Sumatra)

31 July 2026 3	Persib	1–0	Tampines Rovers	Bandung, Indonesia
19:30 UTC+7	Sekulić 81'	Report		Stadium: Si Jalak Harupat Stadium; Attendance: 21,438; Referee: Muhammad Tri Santoso (D.I. Yogyakarta)

After finishing first in the group stage, Persib faced Persija in the semi-final of the competition. The semi-final took place on neutral ground, Kapten I Wayan Dipta Stadium in Bali. Persib faced against Persebaya in the final. Persib would lose the final of the pre-season tournament 5–6 on penalties.

4 August 2026 Semi-finals	Persib	2–1	Persija	Gianyar, Indonesia
16:30 UTC+8	Barros 21'; Sekulić 27'	Report	Kwon 85'	Stadium: Kapten I Wayan Dipta Stadium; Attendance: 0 Referee: Yudai Yamamoto (Japan)

6 August 2026 Final	Persib	1–1 (a.e.t.) (5–6 p)	Persebaya	Gianyar, Indonesia
21:00 UTC+8	Matricardi 24'; Peralta (red card) 112'	Report	Sananta 20'	Stadium: Kapten I Wayan Dipta Stadium; Attendance: 0 Referee: Rio Permana Putra (Riau)
	Penalties
	Barros (penalty missed); Matricardi (penalty scored); Tanque (penalty scored); Kakang (penalty scored); Júlio César (penalty scored); Dedi (penalty scored); Hehanussa (penalty missed)		(penalty scored) Pereira; (penalty scored) Mitrevski; (penalty scored) Mabella; (penalty scored) Ramalho; (penalty missed) Fernandes; (penalty scored) Mota; (penalty scored) Paixão

Following the conclusion of Piala Presiden, Persib will hold a training camp in Bali from 11 August to 19 August and will participate in the upcoming Dewata Challenge Series 2026 on 13–18 August 2026, alongside Bali United and Sabah.

15 August 2026	Sabah	0–3	Persib	Gianyar, Indonesia
20:30 UTC+8		Report	Peralta 28' (pen.); Menalo 76'; Putra 89'	Stadium: Kapten I Wayan Dipta Stadium; Attendance: N/A; Referee: Eristo Chesa Rinenggo (Central Java)

18 August 2026	Persib	3–2	Bali United	Gianyar, Indonesia
19:30 UTC+8	Klok 57' (pen.); Sekulić 88'; Mutombo (yellow card) 67' (yellow-red card) 90+2', (goal) 90+1'	Report	Wilson 51'; Lam (red card) 54'; Ferrari 57'	Stadium: Kapten I Wayan Dipta Stadium

== Competitions ==
=== Overview ===
Competition	First match	Last match	Starting round	Final position	Record							
Competition	First match	Last match	Starting round	Final position	Pld	W	D	L	GF	GA	GD	Win %
Super League	4 September 2026	5 June 2027	Matchday 1	TBD	10	6	1	3	18	11	+7	60.00
AFC Champions League Two	31 August 2026	TBD	Preliminary stage	TBD	5	5	0	0	7	1	+6	100.00
League Cup	30–31 January 2027	TBD	Quarter-finals	TBD	0	0	0	0	0	0	+0	—
ASEAN Club Championship	8 October 2026	TBD	Group stage	TBD	2	2	0	0	9	1	+8	100.00
Total					17	13	1	3	34	13	+21	76.47

Last updated: 22 November 2026
Source: Competitions

=== Super League ===
==== League table ====
Pos	Team	Pld	W	D	L	GF	GA	GD	Pts	Qualification or relegation
2	Dewa United Banten	10	6	2	2	16	13	+3	20	Qualification for the 2027–28 AFC Champions League Two play-offs
3	Bali United	10	6	1	3	27	11	+16	19	
4	Persib	10	6	1	3	18	11	+7	19	
5	Madura United	10	6	1	3	16	11	+5	19	
6	Persita	9	5	3	1	18	11	+7	18	

Updated to match(es) played on 22 November 2026. Source: Super League 2026–27
Rules for classification: 1) Points; 2) Head-to-head points; 3) Head-to-head goal difference; 4) Head-to-head goals scored; 5) Goal difference; 6) Goals scored; 7) Fair-play points; 8) Draw.

==== Matches ====
6 September 2026 1	Persib	3–1	PSM	Bandung, West Java
19:00 WIB	Matricardi 48'; Sekulić 51'; Peralta (yellow card) 56'; Barros 82'	Report	Tanaka 6'; Jevtoski (yellow card) 55'; Akbar (yellow card) 80'	Stadium: Gelora Bandung Lautan Api Stadium; Attendance: 24,923; Referee: Muhammad Tri Santoso

12 September 2026 2	Persija	2–1	Persib	Central Jakarta, Jakarta
15:30 WIB	Jeremejeff 41'; Kolinger (yellow card) 66'; Mamut 90+5'; Loncar (yellow card) 90+7'	Report	Menalo (yellow card) 66'; Sekulić 81'	Stadium: Gelora Bung Karno Stadium; Attendance: 58,961; Referee: Yudai Yamamoto

20 September 2026 3	Persijap	1–2	Persib	Jepara, Central Java
19:00 WIB	Pirulo (pen.), 13'; Yakubu (yellow card) 16'	Report	Haye 21' (yellow card) 39'; Beckham (yellow card) 42'; Barros 55'; Matricardi (yellow card) 76'	Stadium: Gelora Bumi Kartini Stadium; Attendance: 8,500; Referee: Erfan Effendi

11 October 2026 4	Persib	2–2	Dewa United	Soreang, West Java
19:00 WIB	Sekulić 50'; Klok 54'	Report	Vikri 23'; Sadaoui 45+1'; Messidoro (yellow card) 87'	Stadium: Si Jalak Harupat Stadium; Attendance: 20,146; Referee: Hendrik Candra R.

18 October 2026 5	Persib	1–0	Persik	Soreang, West Java
19:00 WIB	Júlio César 79'; Sekulić (yellow card) 90+8'	Report	Kiko (yellow card) 43'; Djaló (yellow card) 73'; Enrique (yellow card) 90+11'	Stadium: Si Jalak Harupat Stadium; Attendance: 19,739; Referee: Muhammad Iqballuddin

22 October 2026 6	Madura United	1–0	Persib	Pamekasan, Madura
19:00 WIB	Mitkov 89'		Guaycochea (yellow card) 74'; Barros (yellow card) 90+6'	Stadium: Gelora Ratu Pamelingan Stadium; Attendance: 5,370; Referee: Dika Rahmat Hidayat

26 October 2026 7	Garudayaksa	1–2	Persib	Bogor, West Java
15:30 WIB	Jayro 65'; Busnić (red card) 85'	Report	Peralta 15'; Alis 90+1'; Guaycochea (yellow card) 90+3'; Haye (yellow card) 90+6'	Stadium: Pakansari Stadium; Attendance: 16,512; Referee: Irfan Wijanarko

1 November 2026 8	Persib	4–0	Isenmulang Kalteng	Soreang, West Java
15:30 WIB	Peralta 14'; Menalo 35', 43'; Júlio César (yellow card) 66'; Klok 86'	Report	Ramdani (yellow card) 16'; Cruz 48'; Vinícius Baiano (yellow card) 69'	Stadium: Si Jalak Harupat Stadium; Attendance: 16,443; Referee: Rio Permana Putra

8 November 2026 9	Java United	2–1	Persib	Semarang, Central Java
19:00 WIB	Ciro Alves 5'; Gustavo (yellow card) 3' (goal) 19'; Ardiansyah (yellow card) 61'; França (yellow card) 85'	Report	Sekulić 70'	Stadium: Jatidiri Stadium; Attendance: 14,172; Referee: Yudai Yamamoto

22 November 2026 10	Persib	2–1	Bali United	Bandung, West Java
19:00 WIB	Barros (yellow card) 43'; Júlio César (yellow card) 75'; Peralta 70' (red card) 88'; Menalo 81'; Teja (yellow card) 90+5'	Report	Dugandžić 66'	Stadium: Gelora Bandung Lautan Api Stadium; Attendance: 24,917; Referee: Mustafa Kamal

29 November 2026 11	Persita	v	Persib	Tangerang, Banten
19:00 WIB				Stadium: Indomilk Arena

6 December 2026 12	Persebaya	v	Persib	Surabaya, East Java
15:30 WIB				Stadium: Gelora Bung Tomo Stadium

14 December 2026 14	Persib	v	PSS	Bandung, West Java
19:00 WIB				Stadium: Gelora Bandung Lautan Api Stadium

20 December 2026 15	Arema	v	Persib	Malang, East Java
19:00 WIB				Stadium: Kanjuruhan Stadium

23 December 2026 16	Persib	v	Bhayangkara Presisi	Bandung, West Java
19:00 WIB				Stadium: Gelora Bandung Lautan Api Stadium

27 December 2026 17	Persib	v	PSIM	Bandung, West Java
19:00 WIB				Stadium: Gelora Bandung Lautan Api Stadium

3 February 2027 13	Persib	v	Borneo Samarinda	Bandung, West Java
19:00 WIB				Stadium: Gelora Bandung Lautan Api Stadium

7 February 2027 18	Dewa United	v	Persib	Serang, Banten
20:30 WIB				Stadium: Banten International Stadium

14 February 2027 19	Persib	v	Madura United	Bandung, West Java
20:30 WIB				Stadium: Gelora Bandung Lautan Api Stadium

21 February 2027 20	Isenmulang Kalteng	v	Persib	Palangkaraya, Central Kalimantan
20:30 WIB				Stadium: Tuah Pahoe Stadium

28 February 2027 21	Persib	v	Persijap	Bandung, West Java
20:30 WIB				Stadium: Gelora Bandung Lautan Api Stadium

14 March 2027 22	Persib	v	Java United	Bandung, West Java
19:00 WIB				Stadium: Gelora Bandung Lautan Api Stadium

21 March 2027 23	PSS	v	Persib	Sleman, Yogyakarta
19:00 WIB				Stadium: Maguwoharjo Stadium

3 April 2027 24	PSIM	v	Persib	Bantul, Yogyakarta
19:00 WIB				Stadium: Sultan Agung Stadium

10 April 2027 25	Persib	v	Arema	Bandung, West Java
19:00 WIB				Stadium: Gelora Bandung Lautan Api Stadium

17 April 2027 26	Bali United	v	Persib	Gianyar, Bali
19:00 WIB				Stadium: Kapten I Wayan Dipta Stadium

24 April 2027 27	Persib	v	Persija	Bandung, West Java
15:30 WIB				Stadium: Gelora Bandung Lautan Api Stadium

30 April 2027 28	Borneo Samarinda	v	Persib	Samarinda, East Kalimantan
19:00 WIB				Stadium: Segiri Stadium

4 May 2027 29	Persib	v	Garudayaksa	Bandung, West Java
19:00 WIB				Stadium: Gelora Bandung Lautan Api Stadium

8 May 2027 30	PSM	v	Persib	Parepare, South Sulawesi
15:30 WIB				Stadium: Gelora BJ Habibie Stadium

13 May 2027 31	Persib	v	Persebaya	Bandung, West Java
15:30 WIB				Stadium: Gelora Bandung Lautan Api Stadium

23 May 2027 32	Persik	v	Persib	Kediri, East Java
19:00 WIB				Stadium: Brawijaya Stadium

29 May 2027 33	Bhayangkara Presisi	v	Persib	Bandar Lampung, Lampung
19:00 WIB

TBD 34	Persib	v	Persita	Bandung, West Java
				Stadium: Gelora Bandung Lautan Api Stadium

=== AFC Champions League Two ===
==== Preliminary stage ====
31 August 2026 Preliminary stage	Persib (Indonesia)	1–0	(Philippines) Manila Digger	Soreang, West Java
19:00 UTC+7	Adam (yellow card) 45+1'; Peralta 89'	Report	Njie (yellow card) 83'	Stadium: Si Jalak Harupat Stadium; Attendance: 0 (Note: Behind closed doors due to AFC sanction.); Referee: Alex King (Australia)

==== Group stage ====
After overcoming Manila Digger in the preliminary stage, Persib is drawn to Group E in the East Region group stage along with FC Seoul, Melbourne Victory, and Thể Công–Viettel FC.

Pos	Team	Pld	W	D	L	GF	GA	GD	Pts	Qualification	SIB	SEO	MVC	TCV
1	(Indonesia) Persib (A)	4	4	0	0	6	1	+5	12	Advance to round of 16	—	–	2–0	1–0
2	(South Korea) FC Seoul	4	2	0	2	8	4	+4	6	Advance to round of 16	0–1	—	–	3–0
3	(Australia) Melbourne Victory	4	1	1	2	5	5	0	4		1–2	3–0	—	–
4	(Vietnam) Thể Công–Viettel	4	0	1	3	1	10	−9	1		–	0–5	1–1	—

Updated to match(es) played on 4 November 2026. Source: ACL2
Rules for classification: Tiebreakers
(A) Advance to a further round

16 September 2026 1	FC Seoul (South Korea)	0–1	(Indonesia) Persib	Seoul, South Korea
17:00 UTC+7	Jeong Ha-won (yellow card) 62'; Son Jeong-beom (yellow card) 78'	Report	Júlio César 5'; Adam (yellow card) 35'; Kakang (yellow card) 78'	Stadium: Seoul World Cup Stadium; Attendance: 5,385; Referee: Faisal Al-Balawi (Saudi Arabia)

14 October 2026 2	Persib (Indonesia)	1–0	(Vietnam) Thể Công–Viettel	Soreang, Indonesia
19:00 UTC+7	Haye (yellow card) 44'; Peralta 45' (pen.); Klok (yellow card) 59' (yellow-red card) 74'	Report	Rimario (yellow card) 44'; Paulinho (yellow card) 48' (yellow-red card) 67'; Nguyễn Văn Tú (yellow card) 55'	Stadium: Si Jalak Harupat Stadium; Attendance: 12,739; Referee: Ahmed Eisa Darwish (United Arab Emirates)

28 October 2026 3	Persib (Indonesia)	2–0	(Australia) Melbourne Victory	Bandung, Indonesia
19:15 UTC+7	Sekulić 47', 67'	Report		Stadium: Si Jalak Harupat Stadium; Attendance: 15,496; Referee: Mohammed Sami Al Ismail

4 November 2026 4	Melbourne Victory (Australia)	1–2	(Indonesia) Persib	Melbourne, Australia
14:45 UTC+7	Ghossaini (yellow card) 46'; Júlio César 71' (o.g.); Santos (yellow card) 90+3'	Report	Júlio César (yellow card) 34'; Menalo 85'; Sekulić 90'	Stadium: Melbourne Rectangular Stadium; Attendance: 3,500; Referee: Clifford Postanes Daypuyat

25 November 2026 5	Persib (Indonesia)	–	(South Korea) FC Seoul	Bandung, Indonesia
				Stadium: Gelora Bandung Lautan Api Stadium

2 December 2026 6	Thể Công–Viettel (Vietnam)	–	(Indonesia) Persib	Hanoi, Vietnam
17:00 UTC+7				Stadium: Hang Day Stadium

=== League Cup ===
As one of the two Super League clubs participating in Asian competitions, Persib will enter the League Cup at the quarter-final stage.

Win Draw Loss Fixtures

30–31 January 2027 Quarter-finals	TBD	v	TBD	TBD
				Stadium: TBD

=== ASEAN Club Championship ===
==== Group stage ====
Pos	Team	Pld	W	D	L	GF	GA	GD	Pts	Qualification	JDT	SIB	CAH	PKR	LCS	POR	SUN
1	(Malaysia) Johor Darul Ta'zim	2	2	0	0	9	1	+8	6	Advance to knockout stage	—	—	—	6–0	1 Apr	—	10 Dec
2	(Indonesia) Persib	2	2	0	0	9	1	+8	6	Advance to knockout stage	17 Dec	—	4 Mar	—	—	—	6–0
3	(Vietnam) Công An Hà Nội	2	1	0	1	2	3	−1	3	Advance to knockout stage	1–3	—	—	10 Dec	—	—	25 Feb
4	(Cambodia) PKR Svay Rieng	2	1	0	1	4	7	−3	3	Advance to knockout stage	—	25 Feb	—	—	17 Dec	4–1	—
5	(Singapore) Lion City Sailors	1	0	0	1	0	1	−1	0		—	10 Dec	0–1	—	—	25 Feb	—
6	(Thailand) Port	2	0	0	2	2	7	−5	0		4 Mar	1–3	1 Apr	—	—	—	—
7	(Myanmar) Shan United	1	0	0	1	0	6	−6	0		—	—	—	1 Apr	4 Mar	17 Dec	—

Updated to match(es) played on 19 November 2026. Source: ASEAN United
Rules for classification: Tiebreakers

8 October 2026 1	Port (Thailand)	1–3	(Indonesia) Persib	Pathum Thani, Thailand
19:00 UTC+7	Soonsup-Bell (yellow card) 61' (goal) 66' (pen.); Bihr (yellow card) 86'; Scalese (yellow card) 90+1'	Report	Matricardi (yellow card) 41'; Mutombo (yellow card) 44'; Adam (yellow card) 56'; Peralta 86'; Berguinho 90+3'; Menalo 90+5'	Stadium: Thammasat Stadium; Referee: Nazmi Nasaruddin (Malaysia)

19 November 2026 2	Persib (Indonesia)	6–0	(Myanmar) Shan United	Bandung, Indonesia
19:00 UTC+7	Sekulić 12', 66'; Peralta 17' (pen.); Menalo 52'; Adam 81'; Barros 89'	Report	Nanitelamio (yellow card) 24'; Sa Aung Pyae Ko (yellow card) 27'	Stadium: Gelora Bandung Lautan Api Stadium; Referee: Kim Woo-sung (South Korea)

10 December 2026 3	Lion City Sailors (Singapore)	–	(Indonesia) Persib	Bishan, Singapore
				Stadium: Bishan Stadium

17 December 2026 4	Persib (Indonesia)	–	(Malaysia) Johor Darul Ta'zim	Bandung, Indonesia
				Stadium: Gelora Bandung Lautan Api Stadium

25 February 2027 5	Svay Rieng (Cambodia)	–	(Indonesia) Persib	Phnom Penh, Cambodia
				Stadium: Morodok Techo National Stadium

4 March 2027 6	Persib (Indonesia)	–	(Vietnam) Công An Hà Nội	Bandung, Indonesia
				Stadium: Gelora Bandung Lautan Api Stadium

== Team statistics ==
=== Appearances and goals ===
As of 22 November 2026

No.	Pos	Nat	Player	Total		Super League		AFC Champions League Two		League Cup		ASEAN Club Championship	
No.	Pos	Nat	Player	Apps	Goals	Apps	Goals	Apps	Goals	Apps	Goals	Apps	Goals
2	DF	(Indonesia) IDN	Eliano Reijnders	15	0	7+1	0	5+0	0	0+0	0	2+0	0
3	DF	(France) FRA	Gabriel Mutombo	7	0	4+0	0	2+0	0	0+0	0	1+0	0
4	DF	(Brazil) BRA	Júlio César	14	2	3+4	1	4+1	1	0+0	0	2+0	0
5	DF	(Indonesia) IDN	Kakang Rudianto	9	0	3+1	0	3+0	0	0+0	0	1+1	0
6	DF	(Indonesia) IDN	Sandy Walsh	9	0	4+2	0	3+0	0	0+0	0	0+0	0
7	MF	(Indonesia) IDN	Beckham Putra	10	0	4+3	0	0+2	0	0+0	0	0+1	0
8	MF	(Argentina) ARG	Luciano Guaycochea	4	0	2+1	0	1+0	0	0+0	0	0+0	0
9	FW	(Bosnia and Herzegovina) BIH	Luka Menalo	16	6	4+6	3	2+2	1	0+0	0	2+0	2
10	FW	(Argentina) ARG	Mariano Peralta	17	7	8+2	3	3+2	2	0+0	0	1+1	2
11	MF	(Indonesia) IDN	Dedi Kusnandar	10	0	3+3	0	1+1	0	0+0	0	0+2	0
13	MF	(Indonesia) IDN	Febri Hariyadi	0	0	0+0	0	0+0	0	0+0	0	0+0	0
14	GK	(Indonesia) IDN	Teja Paku Alam	11	0	6+0	0	3+0	0	0+0	0	2+0	0
17	MF	(Japan) JPN	Gakuto Notsuda	5	0	2+0	0	2+0	0	0+0	0	0+1	0
18	MF	(Indonesia) IDN	Adam Alis	16	2	5+4	1	4+1	0	0+0	0	2+0	1
19	MF	(Indonesia) IDN	Nazriel Alfaro	2	0	0+1	0	1+0	0	0+0	0	0+0	0
22	DF	(Croatia) CRO	Danijel Lončar	12	0	6+1	0	2+2	0	0+0	0	1+0	0
23	MF	(Indonesia) IDN	Marc Klok	14	2	7+1	2	3+1	0	0+0	0	2+0	0
30	MF	(Indonesia) IDN	Rafi Rasyiq	0	0	0+0	0	0+0	0	0+0	0	0+0	0
33	MF	(Indonesia) IDN	Thom Haye	16	1	6+3	1	3+2	0	0+0	0	1+1	0
36	MF	(Indonesia) IDN	Athaya Zahran	0	0	0+0	0	0+0	0	0+0	0	0+0	0
40	MF	(Indonesia) IDN	Ikhwan Tanamal	9	0	4+2	0	1+1	0	0+0	0	1+0	0
48	DF	(Argentina) ARG	Patricio Matricardi	16	1	10+0	1	4+1	0	0+0	0	1+0	0
66	DF	(Indonesia) IDN	Kevin Pasha	0	0	0+0	0	0+0	0	0+0	0	0+0	0
77	FW	(Indonesia) IDN	Ragnar Oratmangoen	10	0	2+4	0	2+1	0	0+0	0	0+1	0
81	GK	(Indonesia) IDN	Fitrah Maulana	6	0	4+0	0	2+0	0	0+0	0	0+0	0
94	FW	(Brazil) BRA	Uilliam Barros	13	3	7+2	2	2+0	0	0+0	0	1+1	1
97	FW	(Brazil) BRA	Berguinho	13	1	4+4	0	2+2	0	0+0	0	1+0	1
99	FW	(Montenegro) MNE	Balša Sekulić	16	9	4+5	4	4+1	3	0+0	0	1+1	2
