= 2025–26 Persib Bandung season =

Indonesian football club season

Persib Bandung
2025–26 season
- Owner: PT Persib Bandung Bermartabat
- CEO: Glenn Sugita
- Head coach: Bojan Hodak
- Stadium: Gelora Bandung Lautan Api Stadium
- Super League: 1st
- AFC Champions League Two: Round of 16
- Top goalscorer: League: Andrew Jung (13); All: Andrew Jung (18)
- Highest home attendance: 30,510 vs. Persijap; Super League, 23 May 2026
- Lowest home attendance: 5,844 vs. Manila Digger; ACL Two, 13 August 2025
- Average home league attendance: 21,342
- Biggest win: 5–0 vs. Madura United (H); Super League, 26 February 2026
- Biggest defeat: 0–3 vs. Ratchaburi (A); ACL Two, 11 February 2026
Home colours	Away colours	Third colours

The 2025–26 season was the 66th season in the history of Persib Bandung, and the club's 29th consecutive season in the top-flight of Indonesian football since it became fully professional. In addition to the domestic league, Persib also participated in the AFC Champions League Two. The season covers the period from 1 July 2025 to 30 June 2026.

Persib clinched their third consecutive league title on the last match of the season, a goalless draw with Persijap on 23 May 2026. They ended the season level on points with runners-up Borneo Samarinda but finished ahead of them via head-to-head points. They also qualified for the knockout stage of AFC Champions League Two for the first time since 2015.

This was Persib's last season under Bojan Hodak who stepped down as head coach on 25 May 2026 to become technical advisor for the club.

== Squad information ==
Note: Age and contract details as of 30 June 2026

No.	Name	Nat.	Date of birth (age)	Signed from	Year signed	Contract ends	Ref.
Goalkeepers
1	Adam Przybek	(Wales)	2 April 2000 (age 26)	(Wales) Penybont	2025	2027	
14	Teja Paku Alam	(Indonesia)	14 September 1994 (age 31)	(Indonesia) Semen Padang	2020	2027	
60	Rhaka Bilhuda	(Indonesia)	11 February 2008 (age 18)	Youth academy	2025	2028	
78	I Made Wirawan	(Indonesia)	1 December 1981 (age 44)	Coaching staff	2026	2026	
81	Fitrah Maulana	(Indonesia)	24 May 2006 (age 20)	Youth academy	2024		
Defenders
2	Eliano Reijnders	(Indonesia)	23 October 2000 (age 26)	(Netherlands) PEC Zwolle	2025	2027	
3	Layvin Kurzawa	(France)	4 September 1992 (age 34)	Free agent	2026	2026	
4	Júlio César	(Brazil)	21 March 1995 (age 31)	(Thailand) Chiangrai United	2025	2027	
5	Kakang Rudianto	(Indonesia)	2 February 2003 (age 23)	Youth academy	2020	2026	
16	Achmad Jufriyanto	(Indonesia)	7 February 1987 (age 39)	(Indonesia) Bhayangkara	2019	2026	
19	Alfeandra Dewangga	(Indonesia)	28 June 2001 (age 25)	(Indonesia) PSIS	2025	2027	
27	Zalnando	(Indonesia)	25 December 1996 (age 29)	(Indonesia) PSIS	2019	2026	
44	Dion Markx	(Indonesia)	29 June 2005 (age 21)	(Netherlands) TOP Oss	2026	2028	
48	Patricio Matricardi	(Argentina)	7 January 1994 (age 32)	(Romania) Botoșani	2025	2027	
55	Frans Putros	(Iraq)	14 July 1993 (age 33)	(Thailand) Port	2025	2026	
73	Zulkifli Lukmansyah	(Indonesia)	8 September 2006 (age 20)	Youth academy	2025		
93	Federico Barba	(Italy)	1 September 1993 (age 33)	(Switzerland) FC Sion	2025	2026	
	Faris Abdul Hafizh	(Indonesia)	21 July 2003 (age 23)	Youth academy	2024		
Midfielders
6	Robi Darwis	(Indonesia)	22 August 2003 (age 23)	Youth academy	2021	2026	
7	Beckham Putra	(Indonesia)	29 October 2001 (age 25)	Youth academy	2018	2028	
8	Luciano Guaycochea	(Argentina)	24 April 1992 (age 34)	(Malaysia) Perak	2025	2027	
11	Dedi Kusnandar	(Indonesia)	23 July 1991 (age 35)	(Indonesia) Bhayangkara	2017	2027	
18	Adam Alis	(Indonesia)	19 December 1993 (age 32)	(Indonesia) Borneo Samarinda	2024 (loan); 2025	2027	
23	Marc Klok	(Indonesia)	20 April 1993 (age 33)	(Indonesia) Persija	2021	2027	
33	Thom Haye	(Indonesia)	9 February 1995 (age 31)	(Netherlands) Almere City	2025	2027	
85	Nazriel Alfaro	(Indonesia)	1 February 2008 (age 18)	Youth academy	2025		
97	Berguinho	(Brazil)	18 February 1997 (age 29)	(Indonesia) Borneo Samarinda	2025	2027	
	Abdul Aziz	(Indonesia)	14 February 1994 (age 32)	(Indonesia) Persis	2019	2026	
Forwards
17	Sergio Castel	(Spain)	22 February 1995 (age 31)	(Cyprus) Apollon Limassol	2026	2026	
36	Athaya Zahran	(Indonesia)	22 January 2006 (age 20)	Youth academy	2025	2028	
67	Saddil Ramdani	(Indonesia)	2 January 1999 (age 27)	(Malaysia) Sabah	2025	2028	
90	Andrew Jung	(France)	8 October 1997 (age 29)	(Greece) OFI	2025	2027	
94	Uilliam Barros	(Brazil)	11 October 1994 (age 32)	(Kuwait) Al-Fahaheel	2025	2027	
98	Ramon Tanque	(Brazil)	10 October 1998 (age 28)	(Cambodia) Visakha	2025	2027	
Out on loan
9	Dimas Drajad	(Indonesia)	30 March 1997 (age 29)	(Indonesia) Persikabo 1973	2024	2027	
12	Henhen Herdiana	(Indonesia)	10 September 1995 (age 31)	Youth academy	2017	2027	
13	Febri Hariyadi	(Indonesia)	19 February 1996 (age 30)	Youth academy	2015	2026	
29	Al Hamra Hehanussa	(Indonesia)	1 July 1999 (age 27)	(Indonesia) Persik	2025	2027	
37	Ferdiansyah Cecep	(Indonesia)	15 July 2003 (age 23)	Youth academy	2021	2026	
56	Rezaldi Hehanussa	(Indonesia)	7 November 1995 (age 31)	(Indonesia) Persija	2023	2026	
71	Adzikry Fadlillah	(Indonesia)	26 February 2003 (age 23)	Youth academy	2024		
Player(s) transferred out during this season
10	Wiliam Marcílio	(Brazil)	31 August 1996 (age 30)	(Indonesia) Arema	2025	2027	

== Coaching staff ==
Position	Staff
Head coach	(Croatia) Bojan Hodak
Assistant coach	(Croatia) Igor Tolić
Goalkeeping coach	(Croatia) Mario Jozić
Assistant goalkeeping coach and interpreter	(Indonesia) I Made Wirawan
Fitness coaches	(Croatia) Miro Petric (Indonesia) Yaya Sunarya
Club doctor	(Indonesia) Wira Prasetya
Physiotherapist	(Indonesia) Benidektus Adi Prianto
Masseurs	(Brazil) Geraldo Santos (Indonesia) Iyang Mulyana (Indonesia) Tatang Sutisna
Kitmen	(Indonesia) Fikri Apriansyah (Indonesia) Heri Rudiana (Indonesia) Ujang Suparman
Video analysts	(Indonesia) Atreeyu Andrey Pamungkas (Indonesia) Gunawan Mochammad Natsir (Indonesia) Pandu Satiagraha Effendi

Last updated: 23 May 2026
Source: I-League Persib

== Management and officials ==
Position	Staff
Club manager	(Indonesia) Umuh Muchtar
Club secretary	(Indonesia) Irfan Suryadireja
Media officer	(Indonesia) Muhammad Jatnika Sadili
Technical director	(Indonesia) Djadjang Nurdjaman

Last updated: 23 May 2026
Source: I-League

== Contracts and transfers ==
=== Transfers in ===
Date	Pos.	Player	From	Fee	Ref.
11 June 2025	FW	(Indonesia) Saddil Ramdani	(Malaysia) Sabah	Free transfer	
22 June 2025	DF	(Indonesia) Al Hamra Hehanussa	(Indonesia) Persik	Free transfer	
25 June 2025	MF	(Argentina) Luciano Guaycochea	(Malaysia) Perak	Free transfer	
25 June 2025	MF	(Brazil) Wiliam Marcílio	(Indonesia) Arema	Free transfer	
26 June 2025	DF	(Indonesia) Alfeandra Dewangga	(Indonesia) PSIS	Free transfer	
26 June 2025	DF	(Brazil) Júlio César	(Thailand) Chiangrai United	Free transfer	
27 June 2025	FW	(Brazil) Berguinho	(Indonesia) Borneo Samarinda	Free transfer	
27 June 2025	FW	(Brazil) Uilliam Barros	(Kuwait) Al-Fahaheel	Free transfer	
28 June 2025	GK	(Wales) Adam Przybek	(Wales) Penybont	Free transfer	
28 June 2025	FW	(Brazil) Ramon Tanque	(Cambodia) Visakha	Free transfer	
2 July 2025	DF	(Argentina) Patricio Matricardi	(Romania) Botoșani	Free transfer	
5 July 2025	MF	(Indonesia) Ikhwan Tanamal	(Indonesia) Persita	Free transfer	
16 July 2025	DF	(Iraq) Frans Putros	(Thailand) Port	Free transfer	
27 August 2025	DF	(Italy) Federico Barba	(Switzerland) Sion	Free transfer	
27 August 2025	MF	(Indonesia) Thom Haye	(Netherlands) Almere City	Free transfer	
31 August 2025	DF	(Indonesia) Eliano Reijnders	(Netherlands) PEC Zwolle	Undisclosed	
31 August 2025	FW	(France) Andrew Jung	(Greece) OFI	Undisclosed	
25 January 2026	DF	(France) Layvin Kurzawa	Free agent (Note: Previous club: Boavista)	Free transfer	
25 January 2026	DF	(Indonesia) Dion Markx	(Netherlands) TOP Oss	Free transfer	
5 February 2026	FW	(Spain) Sergio Castel	(Cyprus) Apollon Limassol	Free transfer	
6 February 2026	GK	(Indonesia) I Made Wirawan	Coaching staff	Free transfer	

=== Transfers out ===
Date	Pos.	Player	To	Fee	Ref.
27 May 2025	FW	(Brazil) Ciro Alves	(Indonesia) Malut United	Free transfer	
29 May 2025	DF	(Netherlands) Nick Kuipers	(Indonesia) Dewa United	Free transfer	
29 May 2025	MF	(Croatia) Mateo Kocijan	(Croatia) Tehničar	Free transfer	
1 June 2025	GK	(Philippines) Kevin Ray Mendoza	(Thailand) Chonburi	Free transfer	
3 June 2025	DF	(Indonesia) Victor Igbonefo	Retired		
5 June 2025	FW	(Spain) Tyronne del Pino	(Indonesia) Malut United	Free transfer	
6 June 2025	FW	(Netherlands) Gervane Kastaneer	(Indonesia) Persis	Free transfer	
8 June 2025	DF	(Indonesia) Edo Febriansah	(Indonesia) Dewa United	Free transfer	
9 June 2025	FW	(Indonesia) Ryan Kurnia	(Indonesia) Bhayangkara	Free transfer	
10 June 2025	DF	(Brazil) Gustavo França	(Indonesia) Malut United	Free transfer	
12 June 2025	DF	(Indonesia) Rachmat Irianto	(Indonesia) Persebaya	Free transfer	
13 June 2025	FW	(Brazil) David da Silva	(Indonesia) Malut United	Free transfer	
29 June 2025	GK	(Indonesia) Sheva Sanggasi	(Indonesia) Persijap	Free transfer	
16 December 2025	MF	(Brazil) Wiliam Marcílio	(South Korea) Chungnam Asan	Free transfer	

=== Loans out ===
Start date	Pos.	Name	To	End date	Ref.
5 June 2025	FW	(Indonesia) Ferdiansyah Cecep	(Indonesia) Semen Padang	30 June 2026	
6 June 2025	MF	(Indonesia) Adzikry Fadlillah	(Indonesia) Persijap	30 June 2026	
6 July 2025	MF	(Indonesia) Ikhwan Tanamal	(Indonesia) Persis	30 June 2026	
29 August 2025	DF	(Indonesia) Zalnando	(Indonesia) Persita	30 June 2026	
31 August 2025	MF	(Indonesia) Dedi Kusnandar	(Indonesia) Bhayangkara	30 January 2026	
31 August 2025	DF	(Indonesia) Henhen Herdiana	(Indonesia) Persik	30 June 2026	
31 August 2025	FW	(Indonesia) Dimas Drajad	(Indonesia) Malut United	30 June 2026	
16 January 2026	DF	(Indonesia) Al Hamra Hehanussa	(Indonesia) Persik	30 June 2026	
16 January 2026	DF	(Indonesia) Rezaldi Hehanussa	(Indonesia) Persik	30 June 2026	
8 February 2026	MF	(Indonesia) Febri Hariyadi	(Indonesia) Persis	30 June 2026	

=== New contracts ===
Date	Pos.	Player	Contract type	Ref.
4 June 2025	MF	(Indonesia) Beckham Putra	Contract extension until 2028	
7 June 2025	MF	(Indonesia) Marc Klok	Contract extension until 2027	

== Pre-season ==
=== Piala Presiden ===
==== Group stage ====
Persib were drawn into Group B, along with Port and Dewa United Banten. Si Jalak Harupat Stadium served as the host venue for the tournament.

Pos	Team	Pld	W	D	L	GF	GA	GD	Pts	Qualification
1	(Thailand) Port	2	2	0	0	4	1	+3	6	Advance to the final
2	(Indonesia) Dewa United Banten	2	0	1	1	2	3	−1	1	Advance to the third place play-off
3	(Indonesia) Persib (H)	2	0	1	1	1	3	−2	1	

Source: Tempo
Rules for classification: Tiebreakers
(H) Hosts

6 July 2025 1	Persib (Indonesia)	0–2	(Thailand) Port	Bandung, Indonesia
		Report	Bordin 45'; Peeradol 68'	Stadium: Si Jalak Harupat Stadium; Attendance: 19,711; Referee: Firdavs Norsafarov (Uzbekistan)

8 July 2025 2	Persib (Indonesia)	1–1	(Indonesia) Dewa United Banten	Bandung, Indonesia
	Marcílio 65'	Report	Scheid (red card) 20'; Egy 90+2' (pen.)	Stadium: Si Jalak Harupat Stadium; Attendance: 19,652; Referee: Asker Nadjfaliev (Uzbekistan)

=== Friendlies ===
21 July 2025 Thailand Tour	Kasem Bundit University (Thailand)	0–2	(Indonesia) Persib	Bangkok, Thailand
				Stadium: Kasem Bundit University Stadium

23 July 2025 Thailand Tour	Ratchaburi (Thailand)	2–2	(Indonesia) Persib	Ratchaburi, Thailand
			Beckham	Stadium: Dragon Solar Park

26 July 2025 Thailand Tour	Police Tero (Thailand)	1–3	(Indonesia) Persib	Bangkok, Thailand
			Tanque; Berguinho	Stadium: Boonyachinda Stadium; Attendance: 3,550

2 August 2025 Friendly	Persib (Indonesia)	1–0	(Australia) Western Sydney Wanderers	Bandung, Indonesia
19:00 WIB	Marcílio 60'	Report		Stadium: Gelora Bandung Lautan Api Stadium; Attendance: 14,633; Referee: Thoriq Alkatiri

== Competitions ==
=== Overview ===
Competition	First match	Last match	Starting round	Final position	Record							
Competition	First match	Last match	Starting round	Final position	Pld	W	D	L	GF	GA	GD	Win %
Super League	9 August 2025	23 May 2026	Matchday 1	Winners	34	24	7	3	59	22	+37	70.59
AFC Champions League Two	13 August 2025	18 February 2026	Preliminary stage	Round of 16	9	6	1	2	14	10	+4	66.67
Total					43	30	8	5	73	32	+41	69.77

Last updated: 23 May 2026
Source: Competitions

=== Super League ===
==== League table ====
Pos	Team	Pld	W	D	L	GF	GA	GD	Pts	Qualification or relegation
1	Persib (C)	34	24	7	3	59	22	+37	79 (Note: Head-to-head points: Persib 4, Borneo Samarinda 1.)	Qualification for the 2026–27 AFC Champions League Two play-offs and 2026–27 ASEAN Club Championship group stage
2	Borneo Samarinda	34	25	4	5	74	31	+43	79	Qualification for the 2026–27 AFC Challenge League and 2026–27 ASEAN Club Championship group stage
3	Persija	34	22	5	7	65	29	+36	71	
4	Persebaya	34	16	10	8	61	35	+26	58	
5	Bhayangkara Presisi	34	16	5	13	53	45	+8	53 (Note: Head-to-head points: Bhayangkara Presisi 9, Malut United 6, Dewa United Banten 3.)	

Source: Super League 2025–26
Rules for classification: 1) Points; 2) Head-to-head points; 3) Head-to-head goal difference; 4) Head-to-head goals scored; 5) Goal difference; 6) Goals scored; 7) Fair-play points; 8) Draw.
(C) Champions

==== Matches ====
9 August 2025 1	Persib	2–0	Semen Padang	Bandung, West Java
15:30 WIB	Barros 40'; Berguinho (yellow card) 45+4'; Febri 90'	Report	Chaby (yellow card) 22'; Herwin (yellow card) 27'; Zidane (yellow card) 42'	Stadium: Gelora Bandung Lautan Api Stadium; Attendance: 14,853; Referee: Muhammad Iqballuddin (Jakarta)

18 August 2025 2	Persijap	2–1	Persib	Jepara, Central Java
18:30 WIB	Hamisi (yellow card) 26'; França 68', (yellow card) 70'; Rosalvo (yellow card) 80'; Moura (yellow card) 90'; Abdallah 90+3'	Report	Kakang (yellow card) 44'; Klok (yellow card) 56'; Barros 90+2' (pen.)	Stadium: Gelora Bumi Kartini Stadium; Attendance: 8,212; Referee: Yudai Yamamoto (Japan)

24 August 2025 3	PSIM	1–1	Persib	Sleman, Yogyakarta
15:30 WIB	Zé Valente (yellow card) 42', (goal) 64' (pen.)	Report	Saddil (yellow card) 19'; Júlio César (yellow card) 62'; Barros (penalty missed) 71'; Matricardi 90+6'; Klok (penalty missed) 90+17'	Stadium: Maguwoharjo Stadium; Attendance: 8,725; Referee: Axel Febrian Sinaga {Jakarta)

12 September 2025 5	Persib	1–0	Persebaya	Bandung, West Java
15:30 WIB	Klok (yellow card) 41'; Putros (yellow card) 52'; Barros 53'; Guaycochea (yellow card) 73' (yellow-red card) 90+1'	Report	Toni (yellow card) 26'; Mitrevski (yellow card) 31'; Irianto (yellow card) 84'; Rivera (red card) 90+1'	Stadium: Gelora Bandung Lautan Api Stadium; Attendance: 22,642; Referee: Candra (West Sumatra)

22 September 2025 6	Arema	1–2	Persib	Malang, East Java
15:30 WIB	Blade 12'; Luiz Gustavo (yellow card) 84'	Report	Barros 59'; Putros (red card) 63'; Barba 90+4'	Stadium: Kanjuruhan Stadium; Attendance: 5,400; Referee: Asker Nadjfaliev (Uzbekistan)

27 September 2025 7	Persita	2–1	Persib	Gianyar, Bali
20:00 WITA	Guseynov 42'; Esal 90+2', (yellow card) 90+7'; Ryuji (yellow card) 45'; Hokky (yellow card) 57'	Report	Guaycochea (penalty missed) 7'; Tanque (yellow card) 16'; Przybek (yellow card) 39'; Júlio César (yellow card) 88'; Beckham 90+9'	Stadium: Kapten I Wayan Dipta Stadium; Attendance: 0 Referee: Eko Saputra (West Sumatra)
Note: Match was originally going to be played at Indomilk Arena but was moved to Kapten I Wayan Dipta Stadium and played behind closed doors for safety reasons.

17 October 2025 9	PSBS	0–3	Persib	Sleman, Yogyakarta
19:00 WIB	Sakho (yellow card) 45+2'	Report	Barba (yellow card) 22'; Jung 45+3' (pen.); Barros 59'; Guaycochea 77'; Matricardi (yellow card) 90'; Marcílio (yellow card) 90+4'	Stadium: Maguwoharjo Stadium; Attendance: 0 Referee: Muhammad Iqballuddin (Jakarta)
Note: Match was played behind closed doors for safety reasons.

27 October 2025 10	Persib	2–0	Persis	Bandung, West Java
19:00 WIB	Guaycochea 12', (red card) 28'; Barros 48'	Report	Tanaka (yellow card) 45+2'; Saimima (yellow card) 86'	Stadium: Gelora Bandung Lautan Api Stadium; Attendance: 13,540; Referee: Rio Permana Putra (Riau)

1 November 2025 11	Bali United	0–1	Persib	Gianyar, Bali
20:00 WITA	R. Arjuna (yellow card) 21'; Rizky Dwi (yellow card) 45+2'; Mustafić (red card) 69'	Report	Reijnders (yellow card) 33'; Haye (yellow card) 35'; Jung 84'; Putros (yellow card) 90+5'	Stadium: Kapten I Wayan Dipta Stadium; Attendance: 14,514; Referee: Irfan Wahyu Wijanarko (Yogyakarta)

21 November 2025 13	Persib	1–0	Dewa United Banten	Bandung, West Java
19:00 WIB	Jung 63' (pen.); Beckham (yellow card) 79' (yellow-red card) 87'; Reijnders (yellow card) 83'	Report	Kuipers (yellow card) 16'; Edo (yellow card) 30'	Stadium: Gelora Bandung Lautan Api Stadium; Attendance: 24,745; Referee: Gedion Dapaherang (Jakarta)

30 November 2025 14	Madura United	1–4	Persib	Pamekasan, East Java
19:00 WIB	Balotelli 69' (pen.); Novan (yellow card) 52'; Monteiro (yellow card) 90+3'	Report	Guaycochea 26'; Barba 40'; Reijnders (yellow card) 45+2'; Barros 70'; Haye 75'; Nazriel (yellow card) 82'; Putros (yellow card) 90'	Stadium: Gelora Ratu Pamelingan Stadium; Attendance: 4,153; Referee: Irfan Wahyu Wijanarko (Yogyakarta)

5 December 2025 4	Persib	3–1	Borneo Samarinda	Bandung, West Java
19:00 WIB	Tanque 42'; Putros (yellow card) 43'; Barba 50'; Saddil 90+6'	Report	Vinícius 18'	Stadium: Gelora Bandung Lautan Api Stadium; Attendance: 26,610; Referee: Candra (West Sumatra)
Note: The match was originally scheduled for 31 August 2025 but was postponed due to safety concerns around the August 2025 Indonesian protests.

14 December 2025 12	Malut United	2–0	Persib	Ternate, North Maluku
15:30 WIT	França (yellow card) 26'; Taufik (yellow card) 33'; Inocêncio 40'; Ciro 45+2'	Report	Putros (yellow card) 43'; Klok (yellow card) 45+5'; Júlio César (yellow card) 82'	Stadium: Gelora Kie Raha Stadium; Attendance: 4,947; Referee: Steven Yubel Poli (North Sulawesi)
Note: The match was originally scheduled for 9 November 2025 but was postponed due to Persib's participation in the AFC Champions League Two group stage.

21 December 2025 15	Persib	2–0	Bhayangkara Presisi	Bandung, West Java
19:00 WIB	Tanque 11', 63'	Report	Dendy (yellow card) 21'	Stadium: Gelora Bandung Lautan Api Stadium; Attendance: 24,730; Referee: Eko Saputra (West Sumatra)

27 December 2025 8	Persib	1–0	PSM	Bandung, West Java
19:00 WIB	Jung 27'; Klok (yellow card) 63'	Report	Akbar (yellow card) 35'; Sakai (yellow card) 51'; Sávio (yellow card) 78'; Syahrul (yellow card) 89'; Resky (yellow card) 90'	Stadium: Gelora Bandung Lautan Api Stadium; Attendance: 29,288; Referee: Yudai Yamamoto (Japan)
Note: The match was originally scheduled for 5 October 2025 but was postponed due to Indonesia's participation in the AFC fourth round of 2026 FIFA World Cup qualification.

5 January 2026 16	Persik	1–1	Persib	Kediri, East Java
19:00 WIB	Yusuf (yellow card) 60'; Firly 90+7'; Walian (yellow card) 90+15'	Report	Barros (yellow card) 22'; Saddil (yellow card) 68' (yellow-red card) 82', (goal) 69'; Guaycochea (yellow card) 68'	Stadium: Brawijaya Stadium; Attendance: 3,571; Referee: Muhammad Tri Santoso (Yogyakarta)

11 January 2026 17	Persib	1–0	Persija	Bandung, West Java
15:30 WIB	Beckham 5'; Haye (yellow card) 34'; Reijnders (yellow card) 74'; Klok (yellow card) 79'; Berguinho (yellow card) 89'	Report	Allano (yellow card) 29'; Tubarão (red card) 54'; Witan (yellow card) 82'	Stadium: Gelora Bandung Lautan Api Stadium; Attendance: 29,616; Referee: Ko Hyung-jin (South Korea)

25 January 2026 18	Persib	1–0	PSBS	Bandung, West Java
19:00 WIB	Beckham (yellow card) 45+1'; Barros (yellow card) 51'; Berguinho (yellow card) 86', (goal) 87'	Report	Luquinhas (yellow card) 28'; Susanto (yellow card) 41' (yellow-red card) 57'; Blanco (yellow card) 79'	Stadium: Gelora Bandung Lautan Api Stadium; Attendance: 28,682; Referee: Axel Febrian Sinaga (Jakarta)

31 January 2026 19	Persis	0–1	Persib	Surakarta, Central Java
15:30 WIB		Report	Jung 41'; Matricardi (yellow card) 45+4'; Haye (yellow card) 60'; Febri (yellow card) 79'	Stadium: Manahan Stadium; Attendance: 11,769; Referee: Muhammad Iqballuddin (Jakarta)

6 February 2026 20	Persib	2–0	Malut United	Bandung, West Java
19:00 WIB	Haye (yellow card) 24', (goal) 36' (pen.); Barba (yellow card) 27'; Saddil 88'	Report	Lestusen (yellow card) 15'; Tyronne (yellow card) 65'; Inocêncio (yellow card) 65'; Frets (yellow card) 90+7'	Stadium: Gelora Bandung Lautan Api Stadium; Attendance: 29,374; Referee: Yudai Yamamoto (Japan)

22 February 2026 22	Persib	1–0	Persita	Bandung, West Java
20:30 WIB	Jung 51'; Putros (yellow card) 90+16'	Report	Rodrigues (red card) 90+10'	Stadium: Gelora Bandung Lautan Api Stadium; Attendance: 17,558; Referee: Candra (West Sumatra)

26 February 2026 23	Persib	5–0	Madura United	Bandung, West Java
20:30 WIB	Tanque 14', 33'; Barros 45+2'; Barba (yellow card) 78'; Jung 80'; Matricardi (yellow card) 87'; Putros 89'	Report	Monteiro (yellow card) 45+2'; Souza (yellow card) 53'	Stadium: Gelora Bandung Lautan Api Stadium; Attendance: 12,123; Referee: Yoko Suprianto (West Sumatra)

2 March 2026 24	Persebaya	2–2	Persib	Surabaya, East Java
20:30 WIB	Bruno 45' (pen.); Rivera 83'; Catur (yellow card) 64'	Report	Barros (yellow card) 45+2'; Guaycochea 52', (yellow card) 76'; Jung 74', (yellow card) 85'; Adam (yellow card) 80'	Stadium: Gelora Bung Tomo Stadium; Attendance: 30,000; Referee: Eko Saputra (West Sumatra)

9 March 2026 25	Persib	3–0	Persik	Bandung, West Java
20:30 WIB	Haye 24' (pen.); Jung 40' (pen.), 53'; Matricardi (yellow card) 55'	Report	Toral (yellow card) 52'; Luna (yellow card) 54'; Novri (yellow card) 85'; Vava (yellow card) 90+3'	Stadium: Gelora Bandung Lautan Api Stadium; Attendance: 19,330; Referee: Rio Permana Putra (Riau)

15 March 2026 21	Borneo Samarinda	1–1	Persib	Samarinda, East Kalimantan
21:30 WITA	Caxambu (yellow card) 54'; Peralta 84' (pen.)	Report	Adam 14'; Kakang (yellow card) 44'; Jung (yellow card) 45+1'; Putros (yellow card) 49'; Beckham (yellow card) 72'	Stadium: Segiri Stadium; Attendance: 11,554; Referee: Razlan Joffri Ali (Malaysia)
Note: The match was originally scheduled for 16 February 2026 but was postponed due to Persib's participation in the AFC Champions League Two round of 16.

5 April 2026 26	Semen Padang	0–2	Persib	Padang, West Sumatera
19:00 WIB	Ripal (yellow card) 16'	Report	Júlio César (yellow card) 15'; Tanque 32', 70'	Stadium: Gelora Haji Agus Salim Stadium; Attendance: 10,800; Referee: Muhammad Tri Santoso (Yogyakarta)

12 April 2026 27	Persib	3–2	Bali United	Bandung, West Java
19:00 WIB	Matricardi (yellow card) 18' (yellow-red card) 65'; Tanque 29'; Haye (yellow card) 45+2'; Guaycochea 55'; Barba 87'; Castel (yellow card) 90+1'; Kakang (yellow card) 90+4'	Report	Yachida 81'; Receveur (yellow card) 83'; Brujin 90+3'	Stadium: Gelora Bandung Lautan Api Stadium; Attendance: 28,932; Referee: Erfan Efendi (East Java)

20 April 2026 28	Dewa United Banten	2–2	Persib	Serang, Banten
19:00 WIB	Martins 24', (yellow card) 57' (yellow-red card) 64'; Johnathan (yellow card) 31'; Kambuaya (yellow card) 45+2', (goal) 61'	Report	Beckham (yellow card) 19'; Haye 77' (pen.); Jung 86'; Klok (yellow card) 87'	Stadium: Banten International Stadium; Attendance: 0 Referee: Yoko Suprianto (West Sumatra)

24 April 2026 29	Persib	0–0	Arema	Bandung, West Java
19:00 WIB		Report	Dalberto (yellow card) 67'	Stadium: Gelora Bandung Lautan Api Stadium; Attendance: 29,814; Referee: Candra (West Sumatra)

30 April 2026 30	Bhayangkara Presisi	2–4	Persib	Bandar Lampung, Lampung
19:00 WIB	Doumbia 6'; Sidibé 26', (yellow card) 79'; Missa (yellow card) 50'; Firza (yellow card) 65'	Report	Barba 45+2'; Berguinho 49'; Beckham 60'; Barros (yellow card) 69'; Adam 89'	Stadium: Sumpah Pemuda Stadium; Attendance: 7,013; Referee: Nazmi Nasaruddin (Malaysia)

4 May 2026 31	Persib	1–0	PSIM	Bandung, West Java
15:30 WIB	Matricardi 2'; Guaycochea (yellow card) 45+3'	Report	Vidal (yellow card) 16'; Ghulam (yellow card) 76'	Stadium: Gelora Bandung Lautan Api Stadium; Attendance: 29,933; Referee: Yudai Yamamoto (Japan)

10 May 2026 32	Persija	1–2	Persib	Samarinda, East Kalimantan
16:30 WITA	Ajaraie 20', (yellow card) 41'; Allano (yellow card) 45+1'	Report	Adam 27', 38'; Guaycochea (yellow card) 51'; Barba (yellow card) 65'	Stadium: Segiri Stadium; Attendance: 5,925; Referee: Firdavs Norsafarov (Uzbekistan)

17 May 2026 33	PSM	1–2	Persib	Parepare, South Sulawesi
20:00 WITA	Lagator (yellow card) 28'; Fernandes 54'; Čumić (yellow card) 74'; Hilmansyah (yellow card) 83'	Report	Haye 33'; Tanque (yellow card) 41'; Klok (yellow card) 65'; Júlio César 90+7'	Stadium: Gelora B.J. Habibie Stadium; Attendance: 8,250; Referee: Asker Nadjfaliev (Uzbekistan)

23 May 2026 34	Persib	0–0	Persijap	Bandung, West Java
16:00 WIB	Teja (yellow card) 90+4'	Report	Tiri (yellow card) 52'; Lessy (yellow card) 87'	Stadium: Gelora Bandung Lautan Api Stadium; Attendance: 30,510; Referee: Ko Hyung-jin (South Korea)

=== AFC Champions League Two ===
==== Preliminary stage ====
13 August 2025 Preliminary stage	Persib (Indonesia)	2–1	(Philippines) Manila Digger	Bandung, Indonesia
19:00 UTC+7	Beckham (yellow card) 35'; Asong 38' (o.g.); Barros 73'; Matricardi (yellow card) 77'	GSA Report	Sambou (yellow card) 42'; Joof 66'; Manneh (yellow card) 81'; Clarino (yellow card) 88'	Stadium: Gelora Bandung Lautan Api Stadium; Attendance: 5,844; Referee: Omar Al-Yaqoubi (Oman)
Note: Match originally scheduled in Philippines changed to neutral ground at Bandung due to lack of ground available to Manila.

==== Group stage ====
Pos	Team	Pld	W	D	L	GF	GA	GD	Pts	Qualification	PSB	BKU	LCS	SEL
1	(Indonesia) Persib	6	4	1	1	11	6	+5	13	Advance to round of 16	—	1–0	1–1	2–0
2	(Thailand) Bangkok United	6	3	1	2	8	7	+1	10 (Note: Head-to-head points: Bangkok United 6, Lion City Sailors 0.)	Advance to round of 16	0–2	—	1–0	1–1
3	(Singapore) Lion City Sailors	6	3	1	2	10	8	+2	10		3–2	1–2	—	4–2
4	(Malaysia) Selangor	6	0	1	5	7	15	−8	1		2–3	2–4	0–1	—

Source: ACL2
Rules for classification: Tiebreakers
Notes:

18 September 2025 1	Persib (Indonesia)	1–1	(Singapore) Lion City Sailors	Bandung, Indonesia
19:15 UTC+7	Saddil 46'; Barba (yellow card) 84'	Report	L. Thy 90+2'	Stadium: Gelora Bandung Lautan Api Stadium; Attendance: 13,566; Referee: Hanna Hattab (Syria)

1 October 2025 2	Bangkok United (Thailand)	0–2	(Indonesia) Persib	Pathum Thani, Thailand
19:15 UTC+7	Arhan (yellow card) 40'	Report	Jung 42'; Barros 71'; Marcílio (yellow card) 85'	Stadium: True BG Stadium; Attendance: 1,427; Referee: Omar Al-Yaqoubi (Oman)

23 October 2025 3	Persib (Indonesia)	2–0	(Malaysia) Selangor	Bandung, Indonesia
19:15 UTC+7	Jung 66' (pen.); Adam 18'	Report	Haiqal (yellow card) 76'	Stadium: Gelora Bandung Lautan Api Stadium; Attendance: 19,679; Referee: Rustam Lutfullin (Uzbekistan)

6 November 2025 4	Selangor (Malaysia)	2–3	(Indonesia) Persib	Petaling Jaya, Malaysia
20:15 UTC+8	Clough 3', (yellow card) 45+4'; Matricardi 17' (o.g.); Chrigor (yellow card) 43'; Abualnadi (yellow card) 58'; Izhan (yellow card) 79'	Report	Jung 49'; Adam 80', 90+7'; Tanque (yellow card) 90+3'; Haye (yellow card) 90+5'	Stadium: Petaling Jaya Stadium; Attendance: 5,505; Referee: Payam Heydari (Iran)

26 November 2025 5	Lion City Sailors (Singapore)	3–2	(Indonesia) Persib	Bishan, Singapore
20:15 UTC+8	L. Thy 9'; Anuar 62'; A. Lopes 71', (yellow card) 82'; L. Tan (yellow card) 14'; Pires (yellow card) 20'; Lestienne (yellow card) 90+6'	Report	Putros 11'; Jung 56'; Matricardi (yellow card) 51'	Stadium: Bishan Stadium; Attendance: 2,578; Referee: Ammar Mahfoodh (Bahrain)

10 December 2025 6	Persib (Indonesia)	1–0	(Thailand) Bangkok United	Bandung, Indonesia
19:15 UTC+7	Barros (penalty missed) 5' (pen.); Tanque 45+1'; Teja (yellow card) 90+4'	Report	Maia (yellow card) 60'; Kosović (yellow card) 60'	Stadium: Gelora Bandung Lautan Api Stadium; Attendance: 28,216; Referee: Ahmed Faisal Al-Ali (Jordan)

==== Knockout stage ====
===== Round of 16 =====
11 February 2026 First leg	Ratchaburi (Thailand)	3–0	(Indonesia) Persib	Ratchaburi, Thailand
19:00 UTC+7	Tana 5', 53'; Mutombo 84', (yellow card) 89'	Report	Reijnders (yellow card) 7'	Stadium: Dragon Solar Park; Attendance: 5.844; Referee: Ahmed Eisa Darwish (United Arab Emirates)

18 February 2026 Second leg	Persib (Indonesia)	1–0	(Thailand) Ratchaburi	Bandung, Indonesia
19:00 UTC+7	Jung 40'	Report		Stadium: Gelora Bandung Lautan Api Stadium; Attendance: 26,406; Referee: Majed Al-Shamrani (Saudi Arabia)

== Team statistics ==
=== Appearances and goals ===
No.	Pos.	Player	Super League		AFC Champions League Two		Total	
No.	Pos.	Player	Apps.	Goals	Apps.	Goals	Apps.	Goals
1	GK	(Wales) Adam Przybek	1	0	0	0	1	0
2	DF	(Indonesia) Eliano Reijnders	25+3	0	8	0	36	0
3	DF	(France) Layvin Kurzawa	0+7	0	0+2	0	9	0
4	DF	(Brazil) Júlio César	16+10	1	5+2	0	33	1
5	DF	(Indonesia) Kakang Rudianto	28	0	1+2	0	31	0
6	DF	(Indonesia) Robi Darwis	2+14	0	0+2	0	18	0
7	MF	(Indonesia) Beckham Putra	18+13	3	3+5	0	39	3
8	MF	(Argentina) Luciano Guaycochea	19+6	5	7+2	0	34	5
11	MF	(Indonesia) Dedi Kusnandar	0+2	0	0	0	2	0
14	GK	(Indonesia) Teja Paku Alam	31	0	9	0	40	0
16	DF	(Indonesia) Achmad Jufriyanto	0	0	0	0	0	0
17	FW	(Spain) Sergio Castel	0+6	0	0+2	0	8	0
18	MF	(Indonesia) Adam Alis	15+13	4	3+3	3	34	7
19	DF	(Indonesia) Alfeandra Dewangga	6+3	0	2+1	0	12	0
23	MF	(Indonesia) Marc Klok	18+7	0	7	0	32	0
33	MF	(Indonesia) Thom Haye	24+4	6	5+1	0	34	6
44	DF	(Indonesia) Dion Markx	0+1	0	0	0	1	0
48	DF	(Argentina) Patricio Matricardi	29+2	2	9	0	40	2
55	DF	(Iraq) Frans Putros	23+5	2	8	1	36	3
67	FW	(Indonesia) Saddil Ramdani	12+13	3	1+4	1	30	4
78	GK	(Indonesia) I Made Wirawan	0	0	0	0	0	0
81	GK	(Indonesia) Fitrah Maulana	2	0	0	0	2	0
85	MF	(Indonesia) Nazriel Alfaro	0+3	0	0	0	3	0
90	FW	(France) Andrew Jung	13+12	13	5+3	5	33	18
93	DF	(Italy) Federico Barba	23+4	5	6+1	0	34	5
94	FW	(Brazil) Uilliam Barros	26+6	8	9	2	41	10
97	MF	(Brazil) Berguinho	25+5	4	7+1	0	38	4
98	FW	(Brazil) Ramon Tanque	14+13	8	2+6	1	35	9
	MF	(Indonesia) Abdul Aziz	0	0	0	0	0	0
Players who have contracts but have left on loan to other clubs
9	FW	(Indonesia) Dimas Drajad	0+1	0	0	0	1	0
12	DF	(Indonesia) Henhen Herdiana	0+1	0	0	0	1	0
13	FW	(Indonesia) Febri Hariyadi	1+7	1	0+1	0	9	1
27	DF	(Indonesia) Zalnando	0	0	0	0	0	0
40	DF	(Indonesia) Al Hamra Hehanussa	0	0	0	0	0	0
56	DF	(Indonesia) Rezaldi Hehanussa	0+1	0	0+2	0	3	0
Players who have contracts but have left permanently to other clubs
10	MF	(Brazil) Wiliam Marcílio	2+5	0	1+2	0	10	0

Source: Competitions

=== Disciplinary record ===
No.	Pos.	Player	Super League			AFC Champions League Two			Total		
No.	Pos.	Player	Yellow card	Second yellow card	Red card	Yellow card	Second yellow card	Red card	Yellow card	Second yellow card	Red card
1	GK	(Wales) Adam Przybek	1	0	0	0	0	0	1	0	0
2	DF	(Indonesia) Eliano Reijnders	4	0	0	1	0	0	5	0	0
3	DF	(France) Layvin Kurzawa	0	0	0	0	0	0	0	0	0
4	DF	(Brazil) Júlio César	4	0	0	0	0	0	4	0	0
5	DF	(Indonesia) Kakang Rudianto	3	0	0	0	0	0	3	0	0
6	DF	(Indonesia) Robi Darwis	0	0	0	0	0	0	0	0	0
7	MF	(Indonesia) Beckham Putra	3	1	0	1	0	0	4	1	0
8	MF	(Argentina) Luciano Guaycochea	4	1	1	0	0	0	4	1	1
11	MF	(Indonesia) Dedi Kusnandar	0	0	0	0	0	0	0	0	0
14	GK	(Indonesia) Teja Paku Alam	1	0	0	1	0	0	2	0	0
16	DF	(Indonesia) Achmad Jufriyanto	0	0	0	0	0	0	0	0	0
17	FW	(Spain) Sergio Castel	1	0	0	0	0	0	1	0	0
18	MF	(Indonesia) Adam Alis	1	0	0	1	0	0	2	0	0
19	DF	(Indonesia) Alfeandra Dewangga	0	0	0	0	0	0	0	0	0
23	MF	(Indonesia) Marc Klok	7	0	0	0	0	0	7	0	0
33	MF	(Indonesia) Thom Haye	5	0	0	1	0	0	6	0	0
44	DF	(Indonesia) Dion Markx	0	0	0	0	0	0	0	0	0
48	DF	(Argentina) Patricio Matricardi	4	1	0	2	0	0	6	1	0
55	DF	(Iraq) Frans Putros	7	0	1	0	0	0	7	0	1
67	FW	(Indonesia) Saddil Ramdani	1	1	0	0	0	0	1	1	0
78	GK	(Indonesia) I Made Wirawan	0	0	0	0	0	0	0	0	0
81	GK	(Indonesia) Fitrah Maulana	0	0	0	0	0	0	0	0	0
85	MF	(Indonesia) Nazriel Alfaro	1	0	0	0	0	0	1	0	0
90	FW	(France) Andrew Jung	2	0	0	1	0	0	3	0	0
93	DF	(Italy) Federico Barba	4	0	0	0	0	0	4	0	0
94	FW	(Brazil) Uilliam Barros	4	0	0	0	0	1	4	0	1
97	MF	(Brazil) Berguinho	3	0	0	0	0	0	3	0	0
98	FW	(Brazil) Ramon Tanque	2	0	0	1	0	0	3	0	0
	MF	(Indonesia) Abdul Aziz	0	0	0	0	0	0	0	0	0
Players who have contracts but have left on loan to other clubs
9	FW	(Indonesia) Dimas Drajad	0	0	0	0	0	0	0	0	0
12	DF	(Indonesia) Henhen Herdiana	0	0	0	0	0	0	0	0	0
13	FW	(Indonesia) Febri Hariyadi	1	0	0	0	0	0	1	0	0
27	DF	(Indonesia) Zalnando	0	0	0	0	0	0	0	0	0
40	DF	(Indonesia) Al Hamra Hehanussa	0	0	0	0	0	0	0	0	0
56	DF	(Indonesia) Rezaldi Hehanussa	0	0	0	0	0	0	0	0	0
Players who have contracts but have left permanently to other clubs
10	MF	(Brazil) Wiliam Marcílio	1	0	0	1	0	0	2	0	0

Source: Competitions
