= 2025–26 AFC Champions League Two group stage =

Asia secondary club football tournament

The 2025–26 AFC Champions League Two group stage was played from 16 September to 24 December 2025. The top two teams from each group qualified for the knockout stage.

== Draw ==
The draw for the group stage took place on 15 August in Kuala Lumpur, Malaysia. The 32 teams were drawn into eight groups of four: four groups each in the West Region (Groups A–D) and the East Region (Groups E–H). For each region, teams were seeded into four pots and drawn into the relevant positions within each group, based on their association ranking and their seeding within their association. Teams from the same association could not be drawn into the same group.

The following 32 teams entered the group-stage draw, which included the 27 direct entrants, two losers from the AFC Champions League Elite qualifying play-offs and the three winners of the preliminary stage.

Region	Groups	Pot 1	Pot 2	Pot 3	Pot 4
West Region	A–D	(Iran) Sepahan^{ACLE}	(Iran) Esteghlal	(Bahrain) Al-Muharraq	(Jordan) Al-Wehdat
West Region	A–D	(Saudi Arabia) Al-Nassr	(Uzbekistan) Andijon	(India) Mohun Bagan SG	(Bahrain) Al Khaldiya
West Region	A–D	(United Arab Emirates) Al Wasl	(Iraq) Al-Zawraa	(Tajikistan) Istiklol	(India) Goa^{PS}
West Region	A–D	(Qatar) Al Ahli	(Jordan) Al-Hussein	(Turkmenistan) Arkadag	(Turkmenistan) Ahal^{PS}
East Region	E–H	(Thailand) Bangkok United^{ACLE}	(Thailand) BG Pathum United	(Hong Kong) Tai Po	(Vietnam) Công An Hà Nội
East Region	E–H	(Japan) Gamba Osaka	(Australia) Macarthur	(Singapore) Lion City Sailors	(Hong Kong) Eastern
East Region	E–H	(South Korea) Pohang Steelers	(Malaysia) Selangor	(Philippines) Kaya–Iloilo	(Singapore) Tampines Rovers
East Region	E–H	(China) Beijing Guoan	(Vietnam) Nam Định	(Thailand) Ratchaburi	(Indonesia) Persib^{PS}

Legend

- ACLE: AFC Champions League Elite qualifying play-off losers
- PS: Preliminary stage winners

== Format ==
In the group stage, each group was played in a double round-robin format on home and away basis. The winners and runners-up of each group advanced to the round of 16 of the knockout stage.

=== Tiebreakers ===
The teams were ranked according to points (3 points for a win, 1 point for a draw, 0 points for a loss). If tied on points, tiebreakers were applied in the following order (Regulations Article 8.3):

1. Points in head-to-head matches among tied teams;
2. Goal difference in head-to-head matches among tied teams;
3. Goals scored in head-to-head matches among tied teams;
4. If more than two teams were tied, and after applying all head-to-head criteria above, a subset of teams were still tied, all head-to-head criteria above were reapplied exclusively to this subset of teams;
5. Goal difference in all group matches;
6. Goals scored in all group matches;
7. Penalty shoot-out if only two teams playing each other in the last round of the group are tied;
8. Disciplinary points (yellow card = 1 point, red card as a result of two yellow cards = 3 points, direct red card = 3 points, yellow card followed by direct red card = 4 points);
9. Drawing of lots.

== Schedule ==
The schedule of the group stage was as follows.

Round	Dates (West region)	Dates (East region)
Matchday 1	16–17 September 2025	17–18 September 2025
Matchday 2	30 September – 1 October 2025	1–2 October 2025
Matchday 3	21–22 October 2025	22–23 October 2025
Matchday 4	4–5 November 2025	5–6 November 2025
Matchday 5	29 October 2025; 25–26 November 2025	26–27 November 2025
Matchday 6	23–24 December 2025	10–11 December 2025

== Groups ==
The detailed schedule was announced after the draw ceremony.

=== West Region ===
==== Group A ====
Pos	Team	Pld	W	D	L	GF	GA	GD	Pts	Qualification	WAS	EST	MUH	ALW
1	(United Arab Emirates) Al Wasl	6	4	2	0	15	6	+9	14	Advance to round of 16	—	7–1	2–2	2–1
2	(Iran) Esteghlal	6	2	2	2	8	10	−2	8	Advance to round of 16	1–1	—	0–1	2–0
3	(Bahrain) Al-Muharraq	6	2	1	3	8	8	0	7		0–1	0–3	—	4–0
4	(Jordan) Al-Wehdat	6	1	1	4	5	12	−7	4		1–2	1–1	2–1	—

Source: ACL2
Rules for classification: Tiebreakers
17 September 2025
20:00 UTC+4

Al Wasl (United Arab Emirates)	7–1	(Iran) Esteghlal
Lima 7', 57' (pen.); Giménez 12'; Malheiro 41'; R. Júnior 71', 90+1'; Bouftini 84'	Report	Cheshmi 45'

Zabeel Stadium, Dubai
Attendance: 3,912
Referee: Nivon Robesh Gamini (Sri Lanka)
17 September 2025
21:15 UTC+3

Al-Muharraq (Bahrain)	4–0	(Jordan) Al-Wehdat
Simões 18'; Rezende 25'; Morelatto 86'; Haikal 90+6' (o.g.)	Report

Al Muharraq Stadium, Arad
Attendance: 4,865
Referee: Nasrullo Kabirov (Tajikistan)

1 October 2025
19:30 UTC+3:30

Esteghlal (Iran)	0–1	(Bahrain) Al-Muharraq
	Report	Juninho 60'

Shahr-e Qods Stadium, Shahr-e Qods
Attendance: 8,251
Referee: Hussein Abo Yehia (Lebanon)
1 October 2025
19:00 UTC+3

Al-Wehdat (Jordan)	1–2	(United Arab Emirates) Al Wasl
Oluwafemi 90+4'	Report	Lima 38'; Saldanha 63'

King Abdullah II Stadium, Amman
Attendance: 1,865
Referee: Sivakorn Pu-Udom (Thailand)

22 October 2025
19:30 UTC+3:30

Esteghlal (Iran)	2–0	(Jordan) Al-Wehdat
El Haddadi 8'; Asani 44'	Report

Shahr-e Qods Stadium, Shahr-e Qods
Attendance: 7,143
Referee: Khaled Al-Hoish (Saudi Arabia)
22 October 2025
21:15 UTC+3

Al-Muharraq (Bahrain)	0–1	(United Arab Emirates) Al Wasl
	Report	Diallo 87'

Al Muharraq Stadium, Arad
Attendance: 5,743
Referee: Yūsuke Araki (Japan)

29 October 2025
21:15 UTC+3

Al-Wehdat (Jordan)	2–1	(Bahrain) Al-Muharraq
Moawad 45+1'; Jamous 58'	Report	Juninho 33'

King Abdullah II Stadium, Amman
Attendance: 1,000
Referee: Mohanad Qasim Sarray (Iraq)

5 November 2025
17:45 UTC+4

Al Wasl (United Arab Emirates)	2–2	(Bahrain) Al-Muharraq
Giménez 45+3' (pen.); Adryelson 84'	Report	Juninho 2'; Simões 49'

Zabeel Stadium, Dubai
Attendance: 1,180
Referee: Thoriq Alkatiri (Indonesia)
5 November 2025
21:15 UTC+3

Al-Wehdat (Jordan)	1–1	(Iran) Esteghlal
Nabhan 19'	Report	Ahmadi 38'

King Abdullah II Stadium, Amman
Attendance: 3,130
Referee: Ahmad A'Qashah (Singapore)

26 November 2025
19:30 UTC+3:30

Esteghlal (Iran)	1–1	(United Arab Emirates) Al Wasl
Saharkhizan 6'	Report	Hugo 63'

Shahr-e Qods Stadium, Shahr-e Qods
Attendance: 9,890
Referee: Kim Hee-gon (South Korea)

24 December 2025
20:00 UTC+4

Al Wasl (United Arab Emirates)	2–1	(Jordan) Al-Wehdat
Adryelson 19'; Lima 79'	Report	Moawad 71'

Zabeel Stadium, Dubai
Attendance: 1,501
Referee: Sadullo Gulmurodi (Tajikistan)
24 December 2025
19:00 UTC+3

Al-Muharraq (Bahrain)	0–3	(Iran) Esteghlal
	Report	Gholizadeh 15'; Nazon 82'; Asani 87'

Al Muharraq Stadium, Arad
Attendance: 5,103
Referee: Rustam Lutfullin (Uzbekistan)

==== Group B ====
Pos	Team	Pld	W	D	L	GF	GA	GD	Pts	Qualification	AHL	ARK	KHA	AND
1	(Qatar) Al Ahli	6	2	4	0	7	4	+3	10	Advance to round of 16	—	2–2	0–0	2–0
2	(Turkmenistan) Arkadag	6	1	4	1	5	6	−1	7	Advance to round of 16	1–1	—	1–0	0–0
3	(Bahrain) Al Khaldiya	6	1	3	2	3	3	0	6		1–2	2–0	—	0–0
4	(Uzbekistan) Andijon	6	0	5	1	1	3	−2	5		0–0	1–1	0–0	—

Source: ACL2
Rules for classification: Tiebreakers
17 September 2025
18:45 UTC+5

Arkadag (Turkmenistan)	0–0	(Uzbekistan) Andijon
	Report

Arkadag Stadium, Arkadag
Attendance: 10,000
Referee: Ahmad A'Qashah (Singapore)
17 September 2025
19:00 UTC+3

Al Ahli (Qatar)	0–0	(Bahrain) Al Khaldiya
	Report

Al Thumama Stadium, Doha
Attendance: 1,103
Referee: Tuan Yaasin (Malaysia)

1 October 2025
19:00 UTC+5

Andijon (Uzbekistan)	0–0	(Qatar) Al Ahli
	Report

Bobur Arena, Andijan
Attendance: 12,850
Referee: Daniel Elder (Australia)
1 October 2025
19:00 UTC+3

Al Khaldiya (Bahrain)	2–0	(Turkmenistan) Arkadag
Beya 10'; Gleison 39'	Report

Bahrain National Stadium, Riffa
Attendance: 250
Referee: Kim Hee-gon (South Korea)

22 October 2025
19:00 UTC+5

Andijon (Uzbekistan)	0–0	(Bahrain) Al Khaldiya
	Report

Bobur Arena, Andijan
Attendance: 6,940
Referee: Ahmad Ibrahim (Jordan)
22 October 2025
19:00 UTC+3

Al Ahli (Qatar)	2–2	(Turkmenistan) Arkadag
Mitrović 41'; Vlap 56'	Report	Atayev 79'; Saparov 90+1'

Al Thumama Stadium, Doha
Attendance: 277
Referee: Wiwat Jumpao-on (Thailand)

29 October 2025
19:00 UTC+3

Al Khaldiya (Bahrain)	1–2	(Qatar) Al Ahli
Al-Romaihi 74'	Report	Fettouhi 65'; S. Yansane 90'

Al Muharraq Stadium, Arad
Attendance: 288
Referee: Alex King (Australia)

5 November 2025
18:45 UTC+5

Arkadag (Turkmenistan)	1–1	(Qatar) Al Ahli
Mitrović 26' (o.g.)	Report	Vlap 23'

Arkadag Stadium, Arkadag
Attendance: 10,000
Referee: Sadullo Gulmurodi (Tajikistan)
5 November 2025
19:00 UTC+3

Al Khaldiya (Bahrain)	0–0	(Uzbekistan) Andijon
	Report

Al Muharraq Stadium, Arad
Attendance: 244
Referee: Chae Sang-hyeop (South Korea)

26 November 2025
19:00 UTC+5

Andijon (Uzbekistan)	1–1	(Turkmenistan) Arkadag
Akinade 63'	Report	Durdyýew 68'

Bobur Arena, Andijan
Attendance: 15,000
Referee: Abdullah Jamali (Kuwait)

24 December 2025
21:00 UTC+5

Arkadag (Turkmenistan)	1–0	(Bahrain) Al Khaldiya
Gurbanow 45'	Report

Arkadag Stadium, Arkadag
Attendance: 10,000
Referee: Ahmad Yacoub Ibrahim (Jordan)
24 December 2025
19:00 UTC+3

Al Ahli (Qatar)	2–0	(Uzbekistan) Andijon
Vlap 26', 65'	Report

Al Thumama Stadium, Doha
Attendance: 361
Referee: Zaid Thamer Mohammed (Iraq)

==== Group C ====
Pos	Team	Pld	W	D	L	GF	GA	GD	Pts	Qualification	ALH	SEP	AHA	MBG
1	(Jordan) Al-Hussein	4	3	0	1	8	4	+4	9	Advance to round of 16	—	1–0	3–1	~~21 Oct~~
2	(Iran) Sepahan	4	2	1	1	5	3	+2	7	Advance to round of 16	2–0	—	2–2	~~30 Sep~~
3	(Turkmenistan) Ahal	4	0	1	3	4	10	−6	1		1–4	0–1	—	~~25 Nov~~
4	(India) Mohun Bagan	0	0	0	0	0	0	0	0	Withdrew (Note: On 27 September 2025, AFC announced that Mohun Bagan SG were considered to have withdrawn from the AFC Champions League Two after they failed to travel to Iran to play their fixture against Sepahan in Isfahan, citing security concerns. Their single match played, a 1–0 defeat to Ahal, was annulled and all their remaining matches were cancelled. This was the second year in a row that Mohun Bagan had been withdrawn from the competition for refusing to fulfill a fixture in Iran. In December 2025 the AFC banned them from entering the following season's AFC competitions, meaning they will not be eligible to re-enter the Champions League until the 2027–28 season)	~~4 Nov~~	~~23 Dec~~	~~0–1~~	—

Source: ACL2
Rules for classification: Tiebreakers
Notes:
16 September 2025
19:15 UTC+5:30

Mohun Bagan (India)	Voided (0–1)	(Turkmenistan) Ahal
	Report	Annayev 83'

Vivekananda Yuba Bharati Krirangan, Kolkata
Attendance: 41,003
Referee: Clifford Daypuyat (Philippines)
16 September 2025
21:15 UTC+3

Al-Hussein (Jordan)	1–0	(Iran) Sepahan
Deeb 28'	Report

Amman International Stadium, Amman (Note: Al-Hussein played their home matches at Amman International Stadium, Amman, instead of their regular home stadium Al-Hassan Stadium, Irbid, which did not meet AFC requirements.)
Attendance: 1,542
Referee: Sultan Mohamed Yousif (United Arab Emirates)

30 September 2025
18:45 UTC+5

Ahal (Turkmenistan)	1–4	(Jordan) Al-Hussein
Tagaýew 21' (pen.)	Report	Bani Mustafa 16'; Kaçorri 33', 45+4'; Fall 38'

Arkadag Stadium, Arkadag (Note: Ahal played their home matches at Arkadag Stadium, Arkadag (first home match) and Naghsh-e-Jahan Stadium, Isfahan (Iran) (remaining home matches), instead of their regular home stadium Köpetdag Stadium, Ashgabat, which did not meet AFC requirements.)
Attendance: 10,000
Referee: Shen Yinhao (China)
30 September 2025
19:30 UTC+3:30

Sepahan (Iran)	Cancelled (Note: On 27 September 2025, AFC announced that Mohun Bagan SG were considered to have withdrawn from the AFC Champions League Two after they failed to appear for their away fixture against Sepahan, due to the safety purpose of after war reactions of Iran War 2025. Their single match was voided.)	(India) Mohun Bagan
	Report

Naghsh-e-Jahan Stadium, Isfahan
Referee: Fu Ming (China)

21 October 2025
17:15 UTC+3:30

Ahal (Turkmenistan)	0–1	(Iran) Sepahan
	Report	Rezaei 82'

Naghsh-e-Jahan Stadium, Isfahan (Iran)
Attendance: 7,200
Referee: Ammar Mahfoodh (Bahrain)
21 October 2025
21:15 UTC+3

Al-Hussein (Jordan)	Cancelled	(India) Mohun Bagan
	Report

Amman International Stadium, Amman
Referee: Tuan Yaasin (Malaysia)

4 November 2025
19:15 UTC+5:30

Mohun Bagan (India)	Cancelled	(Jordan) Al-Hussein
	Report

Vivekananda Yuba Bharati Krirangan, Kolkata
4 November 2025
19:30 UTC+3:30

Sepahan (Iran)	2–2	(Turkmenistan) Ahal
Rezavand 9'; Askari 90+6'	Report	Mirzoyew 27'; Gurgenov 62'

Naghsh-e-Jahan Stadium, Isfahan
Attendance: 8,050
Referee: Razlan Joffri Ali (Malaysia)

25 November 2025
18:45 UTC+5

Ahal (Turkmenistan)	Cancelled	(India) Mohun Bagan
	Report

Naghsh-e-Jahan Stadium, Isfahan (Iran)
25 November 2025
19:30 UTC+3:30

Sepahan (Iran)	2–0	(Jordan) Al-Hussein
Yousefi 73'; Askari 90+4'	Report

Naghsh-e-Jahan Stadium, Isfahan
Attendance: 8,109
Referee: Thoriq Alkatiri (Indonesia)

23 December 2025
19:15 UTC+5:30

Mohun Bagan (India)	Cancelled	(Iran) Sepahan
	Report

Vivekananda Yuba Bharati Krirangan, Kolkata
23 December 2025
16:45 UTC+3

Al-Hussein (Jordan)	3–1	(Turkmenistan) Ahal
Abu Jalboush 65'; Al-Fakhouri 74', 80'	Report	Tagaýew 53'

Amman International Stadium, Amman
Attendance: 704
Referee: Meder Tayçiev (Kyrgyzstan)

==== Group D ====
Pos	Team	Pld	W	D	L	GF	GA	GD	Pts	Qualification	NSR	ZWR	IST	GOA
1	(Saudi Arabia) Al-Nassr	6	6	0	0	22	2	+20	18	Advance to round of 16	—	5–1	5–0	4–0
2	(Iraq) Al-Zawraa	6	3	0	3	8	11	−3	9	Advance to round of 16	0–2	—	2–1	2–1
3	(Tajikistan) Istiklol	6	3	0	3	7	13	−6	9		0–4	2–1	—	2–0
4	(India) Goa	6	0	0	6	3	14	−11	0		1–2	0–2	1–2	—

Source: ACL2
Rules for classification: Tiebreakers
17 September 2025
19:30 UTC+5:30

Goa (India)	0–2	(Iraq) Al-Zawraa
	Report	Bani Hani 44'; Al-Rashdan 90+5'

Jawaharlal Nehru Stadium, Margao
Attendance: 8,756
Referee: Baraa Aisha (Palestine)
17 September 2025
21:15 UTC+3

Al-Nassr (Saudi Arabia)	5–0	(Tajikistan) Istiklol
Ghareeb 14'; Ângelo 17'; Wesley 59'; Coman 89'; Mané 90+3'	Report

Al-Awwal Park, Riyadh
Attendance: 6,038
Referee: Ko Hyung-jin (South Korea)

1 October 2025
18:45 UTC+5

Istiklol (Tajikistan)	2–0	(India) Goa
Soirov 46'; Dehghani 74'	Report

Hisor Central Stadium, Hisor
Attendance: 5,750
Referee: Thoriq Alkatiri (Indonesia)
1 October 2025
21:15 UTC+3

Al-Zawraa (Iraq)	0–2	(Saudi Arabia) Al-Nassr
	Report	Al-Khaibari 52'; João Félix 81'

Al Zawraa Stadium, Baghdad
Attendance: 14,125
Referee: Salman Falahi (Qatar)

22 October 2025
18:45 UTC+5

Istiklol (Tajikistan)	2–1	(Iraq) Al-Zawraa
Juraboev 20'; Komolafe 84'	Report	Gbadamosi 4'

Hisor Central Stadium, Hisor
Attendance: 6,420
Referee: Ahmed Al-Ali (Kuwait)
22 October 2025
19:30 UTC+5:30

Goa (India)	1–2	(Saudi Arabia) Al-Nassr
Fernandes 41'	Report	Ângelo 10'; H. Camara 27'

Jawaharlal Nehru Stadium, Margao
Attendance: 14,389
Referee: Adel Al-Naqbi (United Arab Emirates)

5 November 2025
19:00 UTC+3

Al-Zawraa (Iraq)	2–1	(Tajikistan) Istiklol
Abdulkareem 7'; Gbadamosi 53' (pen.)	Report	Juraboev 64' (pen.)

Al Zawraa Stadium, Baghdad
Attendance: 11,700
Referee: Ahmed Eisa Darwish (United Arab Emirates)
5 November 2025
21:15 UTC+3

Al-Nassr (Saudi Arabia)	4–0	(India) Goa
Ghareeb 35', 53'; Maran 65'; João Félix 84'	Report

Al-Awwal Park, Riyadh
Attendance: 6,736
Referee: Kim Hee-gon (South Korea)

26 November 2025
18:45 UTC+5

Istiklol (Tajikistan)	0–4	(Saudi Arabia) Al-Nassr
	Report	João Félix 12' (pen.); Simakan 40'; Mané 84'; Yahya 90+2'

Hisor Central Stadium, Hisor
Attendance: 15,150
Referee: Alex King (Australia)
26 November 2025
19:00 UTC+3

Al-Zawraa (Iraq)	2–1	(India) Goa
Raad 38'; Abdulkareem 65'	Report	Ismail 51' (o.g.)

Al Zawraa Stadium, Baghdad
Attendance: 8,322
Referee: Firdavs Norsafarov (Uzbekistan)

24 December 2025
21:30 UTC+5:30

Goa (India)	1–2	(Tajikistan) Istiklol
Dražić 8'	Report	Komolafe 53'; Juraboev 56' (pen.)

Jawaharlal Nehru Stadium, Margao
Attendance: 1,083
Referee: Ammar Mahfoodh (Bahrain)
24 December 2025
19:00 UTC+3

Al-Nassr (Saudi Arabia)	5–1	(Iraq) Al-Zawraa
Coman 12', 56'; Wesley 19'; Al-Amri 29'; João Félix 44'	Report	Gbadamosi 50'

Al-Awwal Park, Riyadh
Attendance: 8,575
Referee: Fu Ming (China)

=== East Region ===
==== Group E ====
Pos	Team	Pld	W	D	L	GF	GA	GD	Pts	Qualification	MAC	HNP	TPF	BJG
1	(Australia) Macarthur FC	6	4	1	1	11	6	+5	13	Advance to round of 16	—	2–1	2–1	3–0
2	(Vietnam) Công An Hà Nội	6	2	2	2	9	7	+2	8	Advance to round of 16	1–1	—	3–0	2–1
3	(Hong Kong) Tai Po	6	2	1	3	7	12	−5	7		2–1	1–0	—	3–3
4	(China) Beijing Guoan	6	1	2	3	10	12	−2	5		1–2	2–2	3–0	—

Source: ACL2
Rules for classification: Tiebreakers
18 September 2025
18:00 UTC+8

Tai Po (Hong Kong)	2–1	(Australia) Macarthur
Cividini 3'; Renner 66'	Report	Temelkovski 70' (o.g.)

Mong Kok Stadium, Hong Kong
Attendance: 1,875
Referee: Ahmad Alaeddin (Lebanon)
18 September 2025
20:15 UTC+8

Beijing Guoan (China)	2–2	(Vietnam) Công An Hà Nội
Chi Zhongguo 49'; Zhang Yuan 65'	Report	Vitão 15'; China 73'

Workers' Stadium, Beijing
Attendance: 20,071
Referee: Wiwat Jumpao-on (Thailand)

2 October 2025
17:45 UTC+10

Macarthur (Australia)	3–0	(China) Beijing Guoan
Ikonomidis 4'; Uskok 59'; Gržan 89'	Report

Campbelltown Sports Stadium, Sydney
Attendance: 2,960
Referee: Mohammed Al-Shammari (Qatar)
2 October 2025
19:15 UTC+7

Công An Hà Nội (Vietnam)	3–0	(Hong Kong) Tai Po
China 27', 33'; Phan Văn Đức 88'	Report

Hàng Đẫy Stadium, Hanoi
Attendance: 5,179
Referee: Mohamed Khaled (Bahrain)

23 October 2025
18:00 UTC+8

Tai Po (Hong Kong)	3–3	(China) Beijing Guoan
Renner 17', 90'; Temelkovski 29'	Report	Bai Yang 36'; Ngadeu-Ngadjui 53'; Abreu 83'

Mong Kok Stadium, Hong Kong
Attendance: 3,324
Referee: Sashanka Madushanka (Sri Lanka)
23 October 2025
19:15 UTC+7

Công An Hà Nội (Vietnam)	1–1	(Australia) Macarthur
Lê Văn Đô 30'	Report	Uskok 77'

Hàng Đẫy Stadium, Hanoi
Attendance: 4,169
Referee: Hanna Hattab (Syria)

6 November 2025
18:45 UTC+11

Macarthur (Australia)	2–1	(Vietnam) Công An Hà Nội
Gržan 20'; Caceres 75'	Report	Adou 30'

Campbelltown Sports Stadium, Sydney
Attendance: 2,889
Referee: Clifford Daypuyat (Philippines)
6 November 2025
20:15 UTC+8

Beijing Guoan (China)	3–0	(Hong Kong) Tai Po
Zhang Yuning 46'; Serginho 85', 90+6'	Report

Workers' Stadium, Beijing
Attendance: 21,371
Referee: Mahmood Al-Majarafi (Oman)

27 November 2025
18:45 UTC+11

Macarthur (Australia)	2–1	(Hong Kong) Tai Po
Vickery 50', 70'	Report	Sartori 24'

Campbelltown Sports Stadium, Sydney (Note: Players of Tai Po FC wore black armbands and a moment of silence was observed as a remembrance of victims of a major fire the day before.)
Attendance: 1,544
Referee: Oh Hyeon-jeong (South Korea)
27 November 2025
19:15 UTC+7

Công An Hà Nội (Vietnam)	2–1	(China) Beijing Guoan
Mauk 76'; Nguyễn Đình Bắc 90'	Report	Lin Liangming 11'

Hàng Đẫy Stadium, Hanoi
Attendance: 4,739
Referee: Ahmed Khalil (Bahrain)

11 December 2025
20:15 UTC+8

Tai Po (Hong Kong)	1–0	(Vietnam) Công An Hà Nội
Temelkovski 13' (pen.)	Report

Mong Kok Stadium, Hong Kong
Attendance: 2,544
Referee: Hanna Hattab (Syria)
11 December 2025
20:15 UTC+8

Beijing Guoan (China)	1–2	(Australia) Macarthur
Serginho 59'	Report	Popovic 56'; Sawyer 71' (pen.)

Workers' Stadium, Beijing
Attendance: 20,759
Referee: Ahmad Alaeddin (Lebanon)

==== Group F ====
Pos	Team	Pld	W	D	L	GF	GA	GD	Pts	Qualification	GOS	RPM	TND	EAS
1	(Japan) Gamba Osaka	6	6	0	0	16	2	+14	18	Advance to round of 16	—	2–0	3–1	3–1
2	(Thailand) Ratchaburi	6	3	0	3	15	8	+7	9	Advance to round of 16	0–2	—	2–0	5–1
3	(Vietnam) Nam Định	6	3	0	3	14	7	+7	9		0–1	3–1	—	9–0
4	(Hong Kong) Eastern	6	0	0	6	2	30	−28	0		0–5	0–7	0–1	—

Source: ACL2
Rules for classification: Tiebreakers
17 September 2025
19:00 UTC+9

Gamba Osaka (Japan)	3–1	(Hong Kong) Eastern
Welton 28'; Usami 70'; Hümmet 75'	Report	Gil 29'

Suita City Football Stadium, Suita
Attendance: 6,640
Referee: Meder Tayçiev (Kyrgyzstan)
17 September 2025
19:15 UTC+7

Nam Định (Vietnam)	3–1	(Thailand) Ratchaburi
Caio 35'; Brenner 52', 57'	Report	Tana 60'

Thiên Trường Stadium, Ninh Bình
Attendance: 8,618
Referee: Kim Yu-jeong (South Korea)

2 October 2025
18:00 UTC+8

Eastern (Hong Kong)	0–1	(Vietnam) Nam Định
	Report	Hansen 54'

Mong Kok Stadium, Hong Kong
Attendance: 1,511
Referee: Hasan Akrami (Iran)
2 October 2025
19:15 UTC+7

Ratchaburi (Thailand)	0–2	(Japan) Gamba Osaka
	Report	Abe 64'; Meshino 90+4'

Dragon Solar Park, Ratchaburi
Attendance: 6,769
Referee: Yahya Al-Mulla (United Arab Emirates)

22 October 2025
19:00 UTC+9

Gamba Osaka (Japan)	3–1	(Vietnam) Nam Định
Mito 16'; Jebali 52'; Wálber 89' (o.g.)	Report	Hudlin 90+4'

Suita City Football Stadium, Suita
Attendance: 9,231
Referee: Ahmed Khalil (Bahrain)
22 October 2025
19:15 UTC+7

Ratchaburi (Thailand)	5–1	(Hong Kong) Eastern
Tana 2'; Denílson 39', 49', 56'; Ikhsan 89'	Report	Okubo 74'

Dragon Solar Park, Ratchaburi
Attendance: 3,775
Referee: Baraa Aisha (Palestine)

5 November 2025
20:15 UTC+8

Eastern (Hong Kong)	0–7	(Thailand) Ratchaburi
	Report	Allardice 52'; Tana 56', 72'; Denílson 65', 83'; Ikhsan 89', 90+5'

Mong Kok Stadium, Hong Kong
Attendance: 1,137
Referee: Venkatesh Ramachandran (India)
5 November 2025
19:15 UTC+7

Nam Định (Vietnam)	0–1	(Japan) Gamba Osaka
	Report	Mito 8'

Thiên Trường Stadium, Ninh Bình
Attendance: 4,518
Referee: Baraa Aisha (Palestine)

27 November 2025
18:00 UTC+8

Eastern (Hong Kong)	0–5	(Japan) Gamba Osaka
	Report	R. Yamashita 4'; Fukuoka 19'; Abe 33'; Hümmet 59'; Nawata 75'

Mong Kok Stadium, Hong Kong
Attendance: 1,881
Referee: Ahmad A'Qashah (Singapore)
27 November 2025
17:00 UTC+7

Ratchaburi (Thailand)	2–0	(Vietnam) Nam Định
Sidcley 90+2'; Ikhsan 90+5'	Report

Dragon Solar Park, Ratchaburi
Attendance: 3,779
Referee: Nasrullo Kabirov (Tajikistan)

11 December 2025
19:00 UTC+9

Gamba Osaka (Japan)	2–0	(Thailand) Ratchaburi
Nawata 53'; R. Yamashita 78'	Report

Suita City Football Stadium, Suita
Attendance: 9,569
Referee: Dong Fangyu (China)
11 December 2025
17:00 UTC+7

Nam Định (Vietnam)	9–0	(Hong Kong) Eastern
Caio 2'; Pham-Ba 4'; Hoàng Anh 10'; Rômulo 17', 19'; Brenner 42', 59' (pen.), 64'; Leung Chun Pong 90+2' (o.g.)	Report

Thiên Trường Stadium, Ninh Bình
Attendance: 2,988
Referee: Kim Dae-yong (South Korea)

==== Group G ====
Pos	Team	Pld	W	D	L	GF	GA	GD	Pts	Qualification	PSB	BKU	LCS	SEL
1	(Indonesia) Persib	6	4	1	1	11	6	+5	13	Advance to round of 16	—	1–0	1–1	2–0
2	(Thailand) Bangkok United	6	3	1	2	8	7	+1	10 (Note: Head-to-head points: Bangkok United 6, Lion City Sailors 0.)	Advance to round of 16	0–2	—	1–0	1–1
3	(Singapore) Lion City Sailors	6	3	1	2	10	8	+2	10		3–2	1–2	—	4–2
4	(Malaysia) Selangor	6	0	1	5	7	15	−8	1		2–3	2–4	0–1	—

Source: ACL2
Rules for classification: Tiebreakers
Notes:
18 September 2025
18:00 UTC+8

Selangor (Malaysia)	2–4	(Thailand) Bangkok United
Chrigor 23'; Izwan 73'	Report	Alhaft 11', 24'; Al-Ghassani 15'; Maia 84'

Petaling Jaya Stadium, Petaling Jaya
Attendance: 3,497
Referee: Mooud Bonyadifard (Iran)
18 September 2025
19:15 UTC+7

Persib (Indonesia)	1–1	(Singapore) Lion City Sailors
Ramdani 47'	Report	L. Thy 90+2'

Gelora Bandung Lautan Api Stadium, Bandung
Attendance: 13,566
Referee: Hanna Hattab (Syria)

1 October 2025
18:00 UTC+8

Lion City Sailors (Singapore)	4–2	(Malaysia) Selangor
Lopes 7', 13', 45+4', 54'	Report	Chrigor 37' (pen.); Halim 73'

Bishan Stadium, Singapore
Attendance: 1,745
Referee: Chae Sang-hyeop (South Korea)
1 October 2025
19:15 UTC+7

Bangkok United (Thailand)	0–2	(Indonesia) Persib
	Report	Jung 42'; Barros 71'

Pathum Thani Stadium, Pathum Thani
Attendance: 1,427
Referee: Omar Al-Yaqoubi (Oman)

23 October 2025
19:15 UTC+7

Bangkok United (Thailand)	1–0	(Singapore) Lion City Sailors
Al-Ghassani 63' (pen.)	Report

Pathum Thani Stadium, Pathum Thani
Attendance: 1,006
Referee: Casey Reibelt (Australia)
23 October 2025
19:15 UTC+7

Persib (Indonesia)	2–0	(Malaysia) Selangor
Alis 29'; Jung 66' (pen.)	Report

Gelora Bandung Lautan Api Stadium, Bandung
Attendance: 19,679
Referee: Rustam Lutfullin (Uzbekistan)

6 November 2025
18:00 UTC+8

Lion City Sailors (Singapore)	1–2	(Thailand) Bangkok United
L. Thy 90+1'	Report	Al-Ghassani 45+1'; Adžić 83'

Bishan Stadium, Singapore
Attendance: 2,049
Referee: Ahmad Alaeddin (Lebanon)
6 November 2025
20:15 UTC+8

Selangor (Malaysia)	2–3	(Indonesia) Persib
Chrigor 3'; Matricardi 17' (o.g.)	Report	Jung 48'; Alis 81', 90+7'

Petaling Jaya Stadium, Petaling Jaya
Attendance: 5,505
Referee: Payam Heidari (Iran)

26 November 2025
19:15 UTC+7

Bangkok United (Thailand)	1–1	(Malaysia) Selangor
Rungrath 51'	Report	Chrigor 90+4'

Pathum Thani Stadium, Pathum Thani
Attendance: 1,091
Referee: Zhang Lei (China)
26 November 2025
20:15 UTC+8

Lion City Sailors (Singapore)	3–2	(Indonesia) Persib
L. Thy 9'; Anuar 62'; Lopes 71'	Report	Putros 11'; Jung 56'

Bishan Stadium, Singapore
Attendance: 2,578
Referee: Ammar Mahfoodh (Bahrain)

10 December 2025
19:15 UTC+7

Persib (Indonesia)	1–0	(Thailand) Bangkok United
R. Tanque 45+1'	Report

Gelora Bandung Lautan Api Stadium, Bandung
Attendance: 28,216
Referee: Ahmed Faisal Al-Ali (Jordan)
10 December 2025
20:15 UTC+8

Selangor (Malaysia)	0–1	(Singapore) Lion City Sailors
	Report	Ndenge 50'

Petaling Jaya Stadium, Petaling Jaya
Attendance: 2,354
Referee: Hiroki Kasahara (Japan)

==== Group H ====
Pos	Team	Pld	W	D	L	GF	GA	GD	Pts	Qualification	BGT	PHS	BGP	KAY
1	(Singapore) Tampines Rovers	6	5	1	0	14	5	+9	16	Advance to round of 16	—	1–0	2–1	5–3
2	(South Korea) Pohang Steelers	6	4	1	1	7	2	+5	13	Advance to round of 16	1–1	—	2–0	2–0
3	(Thailand) BG Pathum United	6	2	0	4	5	8	−3	6		0–2	0–1	—	2–1
4	(Philippines) Kaya–Iloilo	6	0	0	6	4	15	−11	0		0–3	0–1	0–2	—

Source: ACL2
Rules for classification: Tiebreakers
18 September 2025
18:00 UTC+8

Kaya–Iloilo (Philippines)	0–3	(Singapore) Tampines Rovers
	Report	Buhagiar 46', 72'; Yoshimoto 52'

New Clark City Athletics Stadium, Capas
Attendance: 120
Referee: Ahmed Faisal Al-Ali (Jordan)
18 September 2025
19:15 UTC+7

BG Pathum United (Thailand)	0–1	(South Korea) Pohang Steelers
	Report	Lee Dong-hyeop 41'

Pathum Thani Stadium, Pathum Thani
Attendance: 5,185
Referee: Ahmed Eisa Darwish (United Arab Emirates)

2 October 2025
19:00 UTC+9

Pohang Steelers (South Korea)	2–0	(Philippines) Kaya–Iloilo
Yamakazi 82' (o.g.); Hwang Seo-woong 90+3'	Report

Pohang Steel Yard, Pohang
Attendance: 4,781
Referee: Wang Di (China)
2 October 2025
18:00 UTC+8

Tampines Rovers (Singapore)	2–1	(Thailand) BG Pathum United
Buhagiar 42'; Higashikawa 57'	Report	Chanathip 86'

Bishan Stadium, Singapore
Attendance: 699
Referee: Bijan Heydari (Iran)

23 October 2025
18:00 UTC+8

Tampines Rovers (Singapore)	1–0	(South Korea) Pohang Steelers
Higashikawa 1'	Report

Bishan Stadium, Singapore
Attendance: 887
Referee: Thoriq Alkatiri (Indonesia)
23 October 2025
18:00 UTC+8

Kaya–Iloilo (Philippines)	0–2	(Thailand) BG Pathum United
	Report	Emaviwe 10'; Doi 69'

New Clark City Athletics Stadium, Capas
Attendance: 422
Referee: Zaid Thamer Mohammed (Iraq)

6 November 2025
19:00 UTC+9

Pohang Steelers (South Korea)	1–1	(Singapore) Tampines Rovers
Cho Sang-hyeok 87'	Report	Glenn Kweh 56'

Pohang Steel Yard, Pohang
Attendance: 2,523
Referee: Nasrullo Kabirov (Tajikistan)
6 November 2025
19:15 UTC+7

BG Pathum United (Thailand)	2–1	(Philippines) Kaya–Iloilo
Fornazari 9', 34'	Report	Daniels 15'

Pathum Thani Stadium, Pathum Thani
Attendance: 5,162
Referee: Mohamed Khaled (Bahrain)

27 November 2025
19:00 UTC+9

Pohang Steelers (South Korea)	2–0	(Thailand) BG Pathum United
Lee Ho-jae 43', 54'	Report

Pohang Steel Yard, Pohang
Attendance: 3,027
Referee: Payam Heydari (Iran)
27 November 2025
20:15 UTC+8

Tampines Rovers (Singapore)	5–3	(Philippines) Kaya–Iloilo
Higashikawa 7', 56'; Yoshimoto 37'; Buhagiar 47'; Ramli 86'	Report	Mike Ott 66'; Bugas 74'; Adli 85' (o.g.)

Bishan Stadium, Singapore
Attendance: 1,069
Referee: Ahmad Yacoub Ibrahim (Jordan)

11 December 2025
19:15 UTC+7

BG Pathum United (Thailand)	0–2	(Singapore) Tampines Rovers
	Report	Kazama 78'; Buhagiar 85'

Pathum Thani Stadium, Pathum Thani
Attendance: 4,606
Referee: Yahya Al-Mulla (United Arab Emirates)
11 December 2025
20:15 UTC+8

Kaya–Iloilo (Philippines)	0–1	(South Korea) Pohang Steelers
	Report	An Jae-jun 18'

New Clark City Athletics Stadium, Capas
Attendance: 659
Referee: Abdulla Al-Marri (Qatar)

== See also ==
- 2025–26 AFC Champions League Elite league stage
- 2025–26 AFC Challenge League group stage
