= Zulkifli Lukmansyah =

Indonesian footballer (born 2006)

Personal information
- Full name: Zulkifli Lukmansyah
- Date of birth: 8 September 2006 (age 20)
- Place of birth: Bandung, Indonesia
- Height: 1.66 m (5 ft 5 in)
- Positions: Right-back; winger

Team information
- Current team: Semen Padang (on loan from Persib Bandung)
- Number: 73

Youth career
- 2021–2024: Persib Bandung

Senior career*
Years	Team	Apps	(Gls)
2024–	Persib Bandung	0	(0)
2026–	→ Semen Padang (loan)	2	(0)

International career
2022	Indonesia U16		
- * Club domestic league appearances and goals as of 20 September 2026

Zulkifli Lukmansyah (born 8 September 2006) is an Indonesian professional footballer who plays as a right-back or winger for Championship club Semen Padang, on loan from Persib Bandung.

== Club career ==
=== Persib Bandung ===
Zulkifli developed through the Persib Bandung youth system, playing for the club's youth academy in the Elite Pro Academy (EPA) Liga 1 tournament. Following his strong performances for both the U18 and U20 teams, he was officially promoted to the senior squad on 27 December 2024 after signing a three-year contract.

He caught public attention after appearing in the 2025 Piala Presiden pre-season tournament. However, an ankle injury sustained before the 2025–26 season significantly limited his playing time for the senior squad, forcing him to spend most of the campaign recovering and maintaining match fitness with the U20 team.

==== Semen Padang (loan) ====
On 30 June 2026, Persib announced that Zulkifli would be loaned to fellow Championship side Semen Padang for the 2026–27 season. The loan move was designed to provide the young defender with crucial top-flight playing time and aid his strategic long-term development. Zulkifli made his professional debut for Semen Padang on 13 September 2026, in a 0–1 away win over Persiraja Banda Aceh at the H. Dimurthala Stadium.

== Career statistics ==
=== Club ===
As of 20 September 2026.

Club	Season	League			Cup		Continental		Other		Total	
Club	Season	Division	Apps	Goals	Apps	Goals	Apps	Goals	Apps	Goals	Apps	Goals
Persib Bandung	2024–25	Liga 1	0	0	0	0	–		0	0	0	0
Persib Bandung	2025–26	Super League	0	0	0	0	–		2 (Note: Appearances in Piala Presiden)	0	2	0
Persib Bandung	2026–27	Super League	0	0	0	0	–		0	0	0	0
Semen Padang (loan)	2026–27	Championship	2	0	0	0	–		0	0	2	0
Career total			2	0	0	0	0	0	2	0	4	0

== Honours ==
=== Club ===
Persib Bandung

- Super League: 2024–25, 2025–26
