= Dion Markx =

Indonesian footballer

Personal information
- Full name: Dion Wilhelmus Eddy Markx
- Date of birth: 29 June 2005 (age 21)
- Place of birth: Nijmegen, Netherlands
- Height: 1.87 m (6 ft 2 in)
- Position: Centre-back

Team information
- Current team: Persita Tangerang (on loan from Persib Bandung)
- Number: 44

Youth career
- –2014: Spero
- 2014–2021: Vitesse
- 2021–2026: NEC

Senior career*
Years	Team	Apps	(Gls)
2025–2026	TOP Oss	2	(0)
2026–	Persib Bandung	1	(0)
2026–	→ Persita Tangerang (loan)	7	(0)

International career^{‡}
2024	Indonesia U20	2	(0)
2025–	Indonesia U23	5	(0)
Medal record
Men's football
Representing Indonesia
FIFA ASEAN Cup
Winner	2026 Indonesia	Team
- * Club domestic league appearances and goals as of 31 October 2026 ‡ National team caps and goals as of 8 December 2025

Dion Wilhelmus Eddy Markx (born 29 June 2005) is a professional footballer who plays as a centre-back for Super League club Persita Tangerang, on loan from Persib Bandung. Born in the Netherlands, he represents Indonesia at youth level.

== Club career ==
=== Youth career ===
He started his career with local academy Spero before joining Vitesse and NEC's academies.

=== TOP Oss ===
In February 2025, he signed with TOP Oss in the Eerste Divisie. He made his professional debut on 1 April in a 1–1 draw against Jong AZ.

=== Persib Bandung ===
On 25 January 2026, Markx officially joined Super League club Persib Bandung on a two and a half-year contract.

==== Loan to Persita Tangerang ====
On 30 August 2026, Markx was loaned to fellow Super League club, Persita Tangerang for the 2026–27 season.

== International career ==
In November 2024, Markx confirmed that he had decided to represent Indonesia at international level. He was called by coach Indra Sjafri to the Indonesia under-20 team to participate at the 2024 Maurice Revello Tournament.

On 26 August 2025, Markx received a called up to the Indonesia under-23 team for the 2026 AFC U-23 Asian Cup qualification. On 6 September, he made his debut for the under-23 team against Macau in a 5–0 win.

== Personal life ==
Born in the Netherlands, Markx is of Indonesian descent.

On 8 February 2025, Markx officially obtained Indonesian citizenship.

== Career statistics ==
=== Club ===
As of match played 31 October 2026

Appearances and goals by club, season and competition
Club	Season	League			National cup		Continental		Other		Total	
Club	Season	Division	Apps	Goals	Apps	Goals	Apps	Goals	Apps	Goals	Apps	Goals
TOP Oss	2024–25	Eerste Divisie	2	0	0	0	—		—		2	0
Persib Bandung	2025–26	Super League	1	0	—		0	0	—		1	0
Persita Tangerang (loan)	2026–27	Super League	7	0	—		0	0	—		7	0
Career total			10	0	0	0	0	0	0	0	10	0

== Honours ==
Persib Bandung

- Super League: 2025–26
- Piala Presiden runner-up: 2026

Indonesia

- FIFA ASEAN Cup: 2026

== See also ==
- List of Indonesia international footballers born outside Indonesia
