= Al Hamra Hehanussa =

Indonesian footballer (born 1999)

Hamra Hehanussa
Personal information
- Full name: Al Hamra Hehanussa
- Date of birth: 1 July 1999 (age 27)
- Place of birth: Tangerang, Indonesia
- Height: 1.78 m (5 ft 10 in)
- Positions: Centre-back; left-back

Team information
- Current team: Garudayaksa (on loan from Persib Bandung)
- Number: 16

Youth career
- 2017–2019: Persija Jakarta

Senior career*
Years	Team	Apps	(Gls)
2019–2022	Persija Jakarta	4	(0)
2021	→ Dewa United (loan)	1	(0)
2023–2025	Persik Kediri	68	(5)
2025–	Persib Bandung	0	(0)
2026	→ Persik Kediri (loan)	15	(0)
2026–	→ Garudayaksa (loan)	1	(0)
- * Club domestic league appearances and goals as of 6 September 2026

Al Hamra Hehanussa (born 1 July 1999) is an Indonesian professional footballer who plays as a defender for Super League club Garudayaksa, on loan from Persib Bandung. He is the younger brother of Rezaldi Hehanusa.

== Club career ==
=== Persija Jakarta ===
Hamra made his first-team debut on 22 June 2019 as a starting in a match against Persela Lamongan at the Surajaya Stadium, Lamongan.

==== Dewa United (loan) ====
He signed for Dewa United on 2021 season, on loan from Persija Jakarta. Hamra made his league debut on 23 November 2021 against PSKC Cimahi at the Gelora Bung Karno Madya Stadium, Jakarta.

=== Persik Kediri ===
On 13 January 2023, Hamra signed a contract with Liga 1 club Persik Kediri from Persija Jakarta. Hamra made his league debut for the club in a 2–0 win against Madura United on 24 January, coming on as a substituted Krisna Bayu Otto. On 4 March, he scored his first league goal for the club, scored from header in a 2–0 home win against PS Barito Putera at Brawijaya Stadium. Four days later, he scored the opening goal, scoring a header in the 35th minute in a 0–2 away win against Persib Bandung. He also continued his good form in March with scored for the club against his former club, Persija Jakarta, process the same goal through a header. The game ended in a 2–0 victory for Persik Kediri. On 11 April, Hamra extended his contract with the club for one season. On 12 June 2025, Hamra officially left Persik Kediri.

=== Persib Bandung ===
On 22 June 2025, Hamra officially signed Persib Bandung.

== Career statistics ==
=== Club ===
As of 6 September 2026.

Club	Season	League			Cup		Continental		Other		Total	
Club	Season	Division	Apps	Goals	Apps	Goals	Apps	Goals	Apps	Goals	Apps	Goals
Persija Jakarta	2019	Liga 1	1	0	0	0	–		0	0	1	0
Persija Jakarta	2020	Liga 1	0	0	0	0	–		0	0	0	0
Persija Jakarta	2022–23	Liga 1	3	0	0	0	–		0	0	3	0
Persija Jakarta	Total		4	0	0	0	–		0	0	4	0
Dewa United (loan)	2021	Liga 2	1	0	0	0	–		0	0	1	0
Persik Kediri	2022–23	Liga 1	10	3	0	0	–		0	0	10	3
Persik Kediri	2023–24	Liga 1	29	1	0	0	–		0	0	29	1
Persik Kediri	2024–25	Liga 1	29	1	0	0	–		0	0	29	1
Persik Kediri	Total		68	5	0	0	–		0	0	68	5
Persib Bandung	2025–26	Super League	0	0	0	0	–		0	0	0	0
Persik Kediri (loan)	2025–26	Super League	15	0	0	0	–		0	0	15	0
Garudayaksa (loan)	2026–27	Super League	1	0	0	0	–		0	0	1	0
Career total			79	5	0	0	0	0	0	0	79	5

== Honours ==
=== Club ===
Persib Bandung

- Piala Presiden runner-up: 2026

Dewa United

- Liga 2 third place (play-offs): 2021
