= Berguinho =

Brazilian footballer

Personal information
- Full name: Rosembergne da Silva
- Date of birth: 18 February 1997 (age 29)
- Place of birth: Natal, Brazil
- Height: 1.85 m (6 ft 1 in)
- Positions: Attacking midfielder; winger

Team information
- Current team: Persib Bandung
- Number: 97

Senior career*
| Years | Team | Apps | (Gls) |
| 2017 | ABC | 15 | (0) |
| 2017–2018 | Linense | 5 | (0) |
| 2019–2021 | Oeste | | |
| 2019 | → Boa Esporte (loan) | 4 | (1) |
| 2019 | → Novorizontino (loan) | 2 | (0) |
| 2019–2021 | → ABC (loan) | 10 | (1) |
| 2021–2022 | Ferroviária | 14 | (0) |
| 2022–2023 | Azuriz | 15 | (0) |
| 2023–2024 | Volta Redonda | 4 | (0) |
| 2023 | → Náutico (loan) | 9 | (3) |
| 2024–2025 | Borneo Samarinda | 29 | (4) |
| 2025– | Persib Bandung | 37 | (2) |
- * Club domestic league appearances and goals as of 1 November 2026

Rosembergne da Silva (born 18 February 1997), commonly known as Berguinho or Berg, is a Brazilian professional footballer who plays as an attacking midfielder or winger for Super League club Persib Bandung.

== Club career ==
Born in Natal, Rio Grande do Norte, Brazil, he joined several local Brazilian clubs. And decided to go abroad for the first time to Indonesia and joined Liga 1 club Borneo for 2024–25 season.

=== Borneo Samarinda ===
In June 2024, he signed a contract with Indonesian Liga 1 club Borneo Samarinda to play in 2024–25 Liga 1. On 12 August 2024, Berguinho made his league debut as a starter in a 1–3 away win against Semen Padang. And also scored his first goal for the team, he scored in the 40th minute at PTIK Stadium. On 22 August 2024, he made his 2024–25 ASEAN Club Championship debut for Borneo, and scoring in a 3–0 win against Singapore Premier League club Lion City Sailors. On 2 November 2024, Berguinho scored the winning goal in a 1–0 win over Dewa United, the latter result saw Borneo Samarinda move to 1st position in the league table.

On 24 April 2025, he was involved in Borneo's 2–5 away win over PSIS Semarang, scoring a goal in the 19th minute. Until the season ended, he appeared in 29 matches, 4 assists and scored 4 goals, he became one of the nine players who left the club.

=== Persib Bandung ===
On 27 June 2025, he signed two-years contract with Liga 1 club Persib Bandung.

== Honours ==
Borneo Samarinda

- Piala Presiden runner-up: 2024

Persib Bandung

- Super League: 2025–26
- Piala Presiden runner-up: 2026
