= Adzikry Fadlillah =

Indonesian footballer (born 2003)

Personal information
- Full name: Muhammad Adzikry Fadlillah
- Date of birth: 26 February 2003 (age 23)
- Place of birth: Bandung, Indonesia
- Height: 1.61 m (5 ft 3 in)
- Position: Attacking midfielder

Team information
- Current team: Persijap Jepara (on loan from Persib Bandung)
- Number: 71

Youth career
- 2019–2020: Persib Bandung U16
- 2021–2023: Persib Bandung U18
- 2023–2024: Persib Bandung U20

Senior career*
Years	Team	Apps	(Gls)
2024–	Persib Bandung	8	(0)
2025–2026	→ Persijap Jepara (loan)	20	(1)
2026–	→ Persijap Jepara (loan)	6	(0)
- * Club domestic league appearances and goals as of 7 November 2026

Muhammad Adzikry Fadlillah (born 26 February 2003) is an Indonesian footballer who plays as attacking midfielder for Super League club Persib Bandung.

Adzikry was promoted to the main club in the middle of the season 2023–24 Liga 1.

== Club career ==
=== Persib Bandung ===
Adzikry is a graduate of the Persib Bandung training program who was promoted to the main club in the middle of the 2023–24 Liga 1 season.

Since 2022, Adzikry has been training with the senior team. However, he had to join the Persib U-20 team competing in Elite Pro Academy 2023–24 Liga 1. With the U-20 team, Adzikry appeared in 17 matches and scored 4 goals. However, Persib U-20's journey in the EPA had to be stopped in the preliminary round even though they had two remaining matches. Maung Ngora only has 17 points and is in fifth place, 7 points behind PSS Sleman U-20 in third place.

Receiving these results, Adzikry was disappointed. However, the opportunity to train with the main squad under the direction of Bojan Hodak has slowly restored his confidence. Moreover, the players in the main squad also received it well.

In the match against Persis Solo 2nd round of 2023–24 Liga 1, Adzikry entered the line-up list for the first time at the main club.

== Honours ==
Persib Bandung

- Liga 1: 2023–24, 2024–25
- Piala Presiden runner-up: 2026
