= Fitrah Maulana =

Indonesian footballer (born 2006)

Personal information
- Full name: Fitrah Maulana Ridwan
- Date of birth: 24 May 2006 (age 20)
- Place of birth: Bandung, Indonesia
- Height: 1.86 m (6 ft 1 in)
- Position: Goalkeeper

Team information
- Current team: Persib Bandung
- Number: 81

Youth career
- Persib Bandung

Senior career*
Years	Team	Apps	(Gls)
2025–	Persib Bandung	6	(0)

International career
2024–2025	Indonesia U20	2	(0)
- * Club domestic league appearances and goals as of 1 November 2026

Fitrah Maulana Ridwan (born 24 May 2006) is an Indonesian professional footballer who plays as a goalkeeper for Super League club Persib Bandung.

== Club career ==
Fitrah Maulana was promoted to Persib Bandung's senior team ahead of the 2025–26 Liga 1 season after progressing through the club's youth system. He was initially registered as a backup goalkeeper before earning an opportunity to start in an official league match.

On 5 December 2025, Fitrah made his professional debut for Persib Bandung in a Super League match against Borneo Samarinda. He started the match and played the full 90 minutes as Persib won the match 3–1.

Following the match, Persib head coach Bojan Hodak stated that Fitrah was selected based on his performances in training and his readiness to compete at senior level.

== Honours ==
Persib Bandung

- Super League: 2025–26
- Piala Presiden runner-up: 2026
