= Luciano Guaycochea =

Argentine footballer

Personal information
- Date of birth: 24 April 1992 (age 34)
- Place of birth: Santa Rosa, La Pampa, Argentina
- Height: 1.78 m (5 ft 10 in)
- Position: Midfielder

Team information
- Current team: Persib Bandung
- Number: 8

Youth career
- Boca Juniors

Senior career*
Years	Team	Apps	(Gls)
2013–2014	Akhisarspor	0	(0)
2014	→ Tavşanlı Linyitspor (loan)	15	(1)
2014–2015	Belgrano Santa Rosa	24	(7)
2016–2017	Zulia	51	(11)
2017–2018	Cúcuta Deportivo	31	(6)
2019–2020	Alianza Petrolera	22	(2)
2020–2021	Deportivo Morón	37	(5)
2022	Oriente Petrolero	13	(2)
2022–2025	Perak	39	(15)
2025–	Persib Bandung	29	(5)
- * Club domestic league appearances and goals as of 25 October 2026

Luciano Guaycochea (born 24 April 1992), commonly known as Lucho, is an Argentine professional footballer who plays as a midfielder for Super League club Persib Bandung.

== Career ==
=== Career in Turkey ===
Guaycochea has scored his first professional goal while playing in Turkey for Akhisar Belediyespor, against TKİ Tavşanlı Linyitspor in the 2013–14 Turkish Cup.

=== Perak ===
On 22 June 2022, Guaycochea signed a contract with Malaysia Premier League club Perak. He was made the club captain from the 2023 season onwards.

=== Persib Bandung ===
On 25 June 2025, Guaycochea signed a two-year contract with Liga 1 Indonesia club Persib Bandung.

== Personal life ==
Guaycochea is the cousin of Argentine international and 2022 FIFA World Cup winner Alexis Mac Allister and his brothers Francis and Kevin.

== Honours ==
Persib Bandung

- Super League: 2025–26
- Piala Presiden runner-up: 2026
