= Mario Jozić =

Croatian footballer (born 1972)

Personal information
- Full name: Mario Jozić
- Date of birth: 21 June 1972 (age 54)
- Place of birth: Slavonski Brod, SR Croatia, SFR Yugoslavia
- Height: 1.82 m (6 ft 0 in)
- Position: Goalkeeper

Senior career*
Years	Team	Apps	(Gls)
1994–1998	Marsonia	31	(0)
1998–1999	Slaven Belupo	11	(0)
1999-2001	Marsonia	18+	(0)
2002–2005	Dinamo Zagreb	1	(0)
2006–2008	Lokomotiva Zagreb		

Managerial career
- 2008–2025: Dinamo Zagreb (goalkeeper coach)
- 2025–: Persib Bandung (goalkeeper coach)
- * Club domestic league appearances and goals

Mario Jozić (born 21 June 1972) is a Croatian retired footballer who played as a goalkeeper.

== Club career ==
Mario Jozic started his career in NK Marsonia from Slavonski Brod. In 2002, he came to NK Dinamo. He ended his career in November 2008.
