= Ramon Tanque =

Brazilian professional football player

Personal information
- Full name: Ramon de Andrade Souza
- Date of birth: 10 September 1998 (age 28)
- Place of birth: Belém, Brazil
- Height: 1.88 m (6 ft 2 in)
- Position: Forward

Team information
- Current team: Chennaiyin (on loan from Persib Bandung)
- Number: 7

Senior career*
Years	Team	Apps	(Gls)
2018–2020	Americano	21	(8)
2020–2021	CRB	6	(0)
2021	Botafogo	15	(6)
2022	Democrata	8	(5)
2022	São Raimundo	4	(6)
2022	Porto Velho	2	(3)
2022	Porto de Caruaru	9	(5)
2022	Manauara	10	(5)
2022–2023	Porto de Caruaru	4	(3)
2023	Bagé	1	(1)
2023–2024	Dornbirn 1913	20	(6)
2024–2025	Visakha	28	(21)
2025–	Persib Bandung	28	(8)
2026–	→ Chennaiyin (loan)	3	(0)
- * Club domestic league appearances and goals as of 26 October 2026

Ramon de Andrade Souza (born 10 September 1998) commonly known as Ramon Tanque, is a Brazilian professional footballer who plays as a forward for Indian Super League club Chennaiyin on loan from Super League club Persib Bandung.

== Career ==
Born in Belém, Brazil, he joined several local Brazilian clubs. He decided to go abroad for the first time to Austria and joined 2. Liga club Dornbirn 1913 for 2023 season. He made his League debut on 19 August 2023 in a match against Admira Wacker, coming as a starter and played full 90 minutes. On 7 October 2023, Tanque scored his first league for Dornbirn in a 2–3 loss against Sturm Graz II. He contributed with 20 appearances and 6 goals in 2023–24 Austrian Football Second League.

=== Visakha ===
Ahead of 2024–25 season, Tanque moved to Asia signed a contract with Cambodian club Visakha in the Cambodian Premier League. On 10 August 2024, he scored his first league goal in his debut match against Phnom Penh Crown despite losing 4–2. On 24 August 2024, he scored a brace for the club in a 3–1 home win against Life Sihanoukville. On 18 September 2024, Tanque scored another brace in a 9–0 big win over Ministry of Interior. On 11 November 2024, he scored the opening goal in a 3–3 draw over Phnom Penh Crown.

On 6 April 2025, Tanque scored in a 0–2 away win against Angkor Tiger, the goal he scored gave him the leads the Cambodian Premier League (CPL) in goals scored with 18 and also assisted three times. Tanque finish the season with 21 goals and 5 assists in 28 league appearances, and he managed to win one individual award in the league as “Top Scorer”.

=== Persib Bandung ===
On 28 June 2025, Tanque signed two-years contract with Super League club Persib Bandung.

== Honours ==
Persib Bandung

- Super League: 2025–26
- Piala Presiden runner-up: 2026

Individual

- Cambodian Premier League Golden Boot: 2024–25
- Cambodian Premier League Team of The Season: 2024–25
