= Andrew Jung =

French footballer (born 1997)

Personal information
- Full name: Andrew Patrick Jung
- Date of birth: 8 October 1997 (age 29)
- Place of birth: Remiremont, France
- Height: 1.92 m (6 ft 4 in)
- Position: Forward

Team information
- Current team: Hanoi FC
- Number: 90

Senior career*
Years	Team	Apps	(Gls)
2014–2019	Reims B	45	(18)
2016–2017	Reims	3	(0)
2018–2019	→ Concarneau (loan)	26	(7)
2019–2021	Châteauroux	9	(0)
2019–2021	Châteauroux B	4	(2)
2020	→ Concarneau (loan)	7	(3)
2020–2021	→ Quevilly-Rouen (loan)	30	(21)
2021–2024	Oostende	3	(0)
2021–2022	→ Nancy (loan)	31	(3)
2022–2023	→ Quevilly-Rouen (loan)	27	(2)
2023–2024	→ Valenciennes (loan)	25	(6)
2024–2025	OFI Crete	28	(5)
2025–2026	Persib Bandung	23	(11)
2026–	Hanoi FC	3	(2)
- * Club domestic league appearances and goals as of 21 July 2026

Andrew Patrick Jung (born 8 October 1997) is a French professional footballer who plays as a forward for V.League 1 club Hanoi FC.

== Career ==
Jung made his professional debut with Reims in a 3–0 Ligue 2 loss to Nîmes on 25 November 2016. On 15 January 2019, he signed a professional contract with Reims while on loan with Concarneau.

On 17 June 2019, Jung signed for Châteauroux on a two-year contract. He made his debut as a second-half substitute in a 0–0 draw against Rodez in Ligue 2 on 2 August 2019.

Jung returned to Concarneau for a second loan spell in January 2020. In June 2020 he signed a contract extension with Châteauroux until 2022, and joined Quevilly-Rouen on loan for the 2020–21 season. After heading the scoring chart with 21 goals, he was named Championnat National player of the season.

On 27 July 2021, Jung signed for Belgian club Oostende on a four-year contract. The transfer fee paid to Châteauroux was reportedly of €900,000. He was immediately loaned out to affiliate club Nancy.

On 31 August 2022, Jung returned to Quevilly-Rouen on a new loan. For the 2023–24 season, Jung joined Valenciennes on loan.

On 29 July 2024, Jung was officially announced as a new signing for OFI Crete for two years.

On 31 August 2025, Jung signed for Indonesian side Persib Bandung with a 2-year contract.

On 21 July 2026, Jung moved to Vietnam, signing for V.League 1 club Hanoi FC.

== Honours ==
Persib Bandung

- Super League: 2025–26

Individual

- Championnat National Top Goal Scorer: 2020–21
