= Patricio Matricardi =

Argentine footballer (born 1994)

Personal information
- Full name: Patricio Martín Matricardi
- Date of birth: 7 January 1994 (age 32)
- Place of birth: Florencio Varela, Buenos Aires, Argentina
- Height: 1.90 m (6 ft 3 in)
- Position: Centre-back

Team information
- Current team: Persib Bandung
- Number: 48

Youth career
- –2013: Argentinos Juniors

Senior career*
Years	Team	Apps	(Gls)
2013–2018	Argentinos Juniors	34	(0)
2017	→ San Martín (loan)	8	(0)
2017–2018	→ Gimnasia y Esgrima (loan)	17	(2)
2018–2020	Asteras Tripolis	18	(0)
2020	Rotor Volgograd	2	(0)
2021	Hermannstadt	14	(1)
2021–2022	Gaz Metan Mediaș	27	(3)
2022–2024	Voluntari	71	(2)
2024–2025	Botoșani	28	(0)
2025–	Persib Bandung	39	(3)
- * Club domestic league appearances and goals as of 1 November 2026

Patricio Martín Matricardi (born 7 January 1994) is an Argentine professional footballer who plays as a centre-back for Super League club Persib Bandung.

== Career ==
Matricardi began his career with Argentinos Juniors, moving into the first-team proper for the 2013–14 Argentine Primera División season and subsequently making three appearances as the club were relegated to Primera B Nacional; he had previously made his senior debut in the Copa Argentina in 2013 versus Sportivo Belgrano. He went on to feature in thirty-two more matches for Argentinos Juniors over the next three campaigns, all in the Argentine Primera División after instant promotion back in 2014. On 10 January 2017, San Martín loaned Matricardi. His first appearance was on 11 March against Huracán.

He returned to his parent club the following June before leaving again on loan to Primera B Nacional's Gimnasia y Esgrima. Matricardi scored twice in seventeen games, including his career first in November in an away draw with Los Andes. In July 2018, Matricardi signed with Super League Greece side Asteras Tripolis. He remained for two seasons and made twenty appearances in all competitions. On 14 August 2020, Matricardi signed with Russian Premier League club Rotor Volgograd. He made his debut in a home loss to Rubin Kazan on 27 September. Two more games followed.

Matricardi terminated his contract with Rotor Volgograd on 19 January 2021. On 25 January, Matricardi headed to Romania with Hermannstadt of Liga I. His debut appearance came on 28 January, as he featured for the full duration of a 1–1 draw at home to Chindia Târgoviște.

== Career statistics ==
As of 1 November 2026

Club statistics
Club	Season	League			Cup		League Cup		Continental		Other		Total	
Club	Season	Division	Apps	Goals	Apps	Goals	Apps	Goals	Apps	Goals	Apps	Goals	Apps	Goals
Argentinos Juniors	2012–13	Primera División	0	0	1	0	—		—		0	0	1	0
Argentinos Juniors	2013–14	Primera División	3	0	0	0	—		—		0	0	3	0
Argentinos Juniors	2014	Primera B Nacional	0	0	0	0	—		—		0	0	0	0
Argentinos Juniors	2015	Primera División	26	0	2	0	—		—		1 (Note: Appearance(s) in the Primera División play-offs)	0	29	0
Argentinos Juniors	2016	Primera División	5	0	0	0	—		—		0	0	5	0
Argentinos Juniors	2016–17	Primera B Nacional	0	0	0	0	—		—		0	0	0	0
Argentinos Juniors	2017–18	Primera División	0	0	0	0	—		—		0	0	0	0
Argentinos Juniors	Total		34	0	3	0	—		—		1	0	38	0
San Martín (loan)	2016–17	Primera División	8	0	0	0	—		—		0	0	8	0
Gimnasia y Esgrima (loan)	2017–18	Primera B Nacional	17	2	0	0	—		—		0	0	17	2
Asteras Tripolis	2018–19	Super League	3	0	1	0	—		0	0	0	0	4	0
Asteras Tripolis	2019–20	Super League	15	0	1	0	—		0	0	0	0	16	0
Asteras Tripolis	Total		18	0	2	0	—		—		0	0	20	0
Rotor Volgograd	2020–21	Russian Premier League	2	0	1	0	—		0	0	0	0	3	0
Hermannstadt	2020–21	Liga I	14	1	0	0	—		—		0	0	14	1
Gaz Metan Mediaș	2021–22	Liga I	27	3	1	0	—		—		—		21	3
Voluntari	2022–23	Liga I	35	1	2	0	—		—		1 (Note: Appearance in Liga I European play-offs)	0	38	1
Voluntari	2023–24	Liga I	36	1	3	1	—		—		—		39	2
Voluntari	Total		71	2	5	1	—		—		1	0	77	3
Botoșani	2024–25	Liga I	28	0	2	0	—		—		—		30	0
Persib Bandung	2025–26	Super League	31	2	0	0	0	0	9 (Note: Appearance in AFC Champions League Two)	0	—		40	2
Persib Bandung	2026–27	Super League	8	1	0	0	0	0	3	0	1 (Note: Appearance in ASEAN Club Championship)	0	12	1
Career total			258	11	14	1	—		12	0	3	0	287	12

== Honours ==
Persib Bandung

- Super League: 2025–26
- Piala Presiden runner-up: 2026
