= Uilliam Barros =

Brazilian footballer

Personal information
- Full name: Uilliam Barros Pereira
- Date of birth: 11 October 1994 (age 32)
- Place of birth: Bonito, Bahia, Brazil
- Height: 1.82 m (6 ft 0 in)
- Position: Forward

Team information
- Current team: Persib Bandung
- Number: 94

Youth career
- 2012–2013: Fortaleza U20

Senior career*
Years	Team	Apps	(Gls)
2014–2015	Fortaleza	28	(1)
2016	Altos	11	(3)
2017–2018	Sampaio Corrêa	33	(7)
2019	Ferroviária	10	(0)
2019	→ Operário Ferroviário	18	(2)
2020–2021	Paysandu	18	(4)
2021	Criciúma	6	(0)
2021–2022	Al-Sahel	19	(4)
2022–2023	Al-Hazem	11	(0)
2023	Al-Kholood	8	(6)
2024–2025	Al-Fahaheel	19	(22)
2026–	Persib Bandung	41	(10)
- * Club domestic league appearances and goals as of 1 November 2026

Uilliam Barros Pereira (born 11 October 1994) is a Brazilian professional footballer who plays as a forward for Super League club Persib Bandung.

== Club career ==
Born in Bonito, Mato Grosso do Sul, Brazil, Uilliam is a youth product from Fortaleza. He joined Altos in 2016 season. In March 2017, Uilliam signed for Sampaio Corrêa on a contract until the end of the 2018 season. He had his good season with Sampaio Corrêa in 2017-18, contributing with 13 goals in 56 games across all competitions.

Paysandu announced the signing of Uilliam on 23 January 2020, Paysandu will be the sixth club in his career, which also includes spells at Fortaleza, Altos, Sampaio Corrêa, Ferroviária and, lastly, Operário Ferroviário, for whom he played in the 2019 Campeonato Brasileiro Série B.

On 23 February 2021, Uilliam signed a contract with Criciúma. Criciúma have announced the termination of their contract with Uilliam, he was a starter in eight matches between the Campeonato Catarinense, where Criciúma ended up relegated, and the Copa do Brasil, but lost his place after Paulo Baier took over. In the Brazilian Série C, he played 77 minutes in six games.

=== Persib Bandung ===
Persib Bandung announced the signing of Uilliam on 27 June 2025 with two-years contract. Previously, he had moved to Saudi Arabia, joined Al-Sahel, Al-Hazem, and Al-Kholood since 2022 to 2023, until finally leaving for the Kuwait Premier League to join Al-Fahaheel until the 2024–25 season ends.

== Honours ==
Fortaleza

- Campeonato Cearense: 2015, 2016

Altos

- Campeonato Piauiense: 2017

Corrêa

- Campeonato Maranhense: 2017–18
- Copa do Nordeste: 2018

Pasyandu

- Campeonato Paraense: 2020

Persib Bandung

- Super League: 2025–26
- Piala Presiden runner-up: 2026
