= 2022–23 Persib Bandung season =

Indonesian football club season

Persib Bandung
2022–23 season
- Owner: PT Persib Bandung Bermartabat
- CEO: Glenn Sugita
- Head coach: Robert Alberts (until 11 August); Budiman Yunus (caretaker, until 20 August); Luis Milla (since 20 August)
- Stadium: Gelora Bandung Lautan Api Stadium
- Liga 1: 3rd
- Piala Indonesia: Cancelled
- Top goalscorer: David da Silva (24)
- Highest home attendance: 23,579 vs. Persikabo 1973; 15 April 2023
- Lowest home attendance: 988 vs. Bhayangkara; 24 March 2023 (excluding matches played behind closed doors)
- Average home league attendance: 7,498
- Biggest win: 5–2 vs. Barito Putera (H); 16 September 2022; 3–0 vs. Persik (H); 7 December 2022
- Biggest defeat: 1–5 vs. PSM (A); 29 August 2022; 0–4 vs. Persita (A); 9 April 2023
Home colours	Away colours	Third colours

The 2022–23 season was the 63rd season in the history of Persib Bandung, and the club's 26th consecutive season in the top-flight of Indonesian football since it became fully professional.

== Squad information ==
Note: Age and contract details as of 30 April 2023

No.	Name	Nat.	Date of birth (age)	Height	Signed from	Year signed	Contract ends	Ref.
Goalkeepers
1	Fitrul Dwi Rustapa	(Indonesia)	5 June 1995 (age 27)	1.77 m	(Indonesia) Persipura	2022	2024	
14	Teja Paku Alam	(Indonesia)	14 September 1994 (age 28)	1.77 m	(Indonesia) Semen Padang	2020	2027	
15	I Made Wirawan	(Indonesia)	1 December 1981 (age 41)	1.80 m	(Indonesia) Persiba	2012	2023	
26	Satrio Azhar	(Indonesia)	16 May 2001 (age 21)	1.77 m	(Indonesia) Bandung United	2022	2024	
34	Reky Rahayu	(Indonesia)	8 May 1993 (age 29)	1.76 m	(Indonesia) Kalteng Putra	2022	2023	
97	Mario Londok	(Indonesia)	14 November 1997 (age 25)	1.80 m	(Indonesia) Persipura	2023	2025	
Defenders
2	Nick Kuipers	(Netherlands)	8 October 1992 (age 30)	1.93 m	(Netherlands) ADO Den Haag	2019	2024	
3	Eriyanto	(Indonesia)	12 March 1996 (age 27)	1.68 m	(Indonesia) Persis	2022	2024	
5	Kakang Rudianto	(Indonesia)	2 February 2003 (age 20)	1.85 m	Youth academy	2020	2023	
12	Henhen Herdiana	(Indonesia)	10 September 1995 (age 27)	1.69 m	Youth academy	2017	2027	
16	Achmad Jufriyanto (captain)	(Indonesia)	7 February 1987 (age 36)	1.80 m	(Malaysia) Kuala Lumpur	2019	2024	
18	David Rumakiek	(Indonesia)	18 July 1999 (age 23)	1.70 m	(Indonesia) Persipura	2022	2023+1	
27	Zalnando	(Indonesia)	25 December 1996 (age 26)	1.76 m	(Indonesia) Sriwijaya	2019	2023	
32	Victor Igbonefo	(Indonesia)	10 October 1985 (age 37)	1.83 m	(Thailand) PTT Rayong	2020	2024	
56	Rezaldi Hehanussa	(Indonesia)	7 November 1995 (age 27)	1.78 m	(Indonesia) Persija	2023	2025	
66	Daisuke Sato	(Philippines)	20 September 1994 (age 28)	1.70 m	(Thailand) Ratchaburi Mitr Phol	2022	2025	
Midfielders
6	Robi Darwis	(Indonesia)	22 August 2003 (age 19)	1.70 m	Youth academy	2021	2023	
7	Beckham Putra	(Indonesia)	29 October 2001 (age 21)	1.64 m	Youth academy	2018	2025	
8	Abdul Aziz	(Indonesia)	14 February 1994 (age 29)	1.72 m	(Indonesia) PSMS	2019	2023	
10	Marc Klok	(Indonesia)	20 April 1993 (age 30)	1.77 m	(Indonesia) Persija	2021	2025	
11	Dedi Kusnandar	(Indonesia)	23 July 1991 (age 31)	1.75 m	(Malaysia) Sabah	2017	2025	
13	Febri Hariyadi	(Indonesia)	19 February 1996 (age 27)	1.68 m	Youth academy	2015	2026	
17	Ferdiansyah Cecep	(Indonesia)	15 July 2003 (age 19)	1.72 m	Youth academy	2021	2023	
53	Rachmat Irianto	(Indonesia)	3 September 1999 (age 23)	1.73 m	(Indonesia) Persebaya	2022	2025	
55	Ricky Kambuaya	(Indonesia)	5 May 1996 (age 26)	1.74 m	(Indonesia) Persebaya	2022	2024	
70	Arsan Makarin	(Indonesia)	8 February 2001 (age 22)	1.66 m	(Indonesia) Bandung United	2022	2024	
93	Erwin Ramdani	(Indonesia)	3 November 1993 (age 29)	1.69 m	(Indonesia) PSMS	2019	2023	
Forwards
19	David da Silva	(Brazil)	12 November 1989 (age 33)	1.83 m	(Malaysia) Terengganu	2021	2023	
21	Frets Butuan	(Indonesia)	4 June 1996 (age 26)	1.67 m	(Indonesia) PSMS	2019	2023	
30	Ezra Walian	(Indonesia)	22 October 1997 (age 25)	1.82 m	(Indonesia) PSM	2021	2024	
77	Ciro Alves	(Brazil)	18 April 1989 (age 34)	1.75 m	(Indonesia) Persikabo 1973	2022	2025	
99	Ridwan Ansori	(Indonesia)	13 February 2004 (age 19)	1.74 m	Youth academy	2022	2023	
Out on loan
4	Bayu Fiqri	(Indonesia)	10 August 2001 (age 21)	1.76 m	Free agent	2020	2023	

== Coaching staff ==
Position	Staff
Head coach	(Spain) Luis Milla
Assistant coach	(Spain) Manuel Cascallana
Goalkeeping coach	(Brazil) Luizinho Passos
Fitness coaches	(Spain) Carlos Rodriguez (Indonesia) Yaya Sunarya
Club doctor	(Indonesia) Mohammad Raffi Ghani
Physiotherapist	(Indonesia) Benidektus Adi Prianto
Masseurs	(Indonesia) Iyang Mulyana (Indonesia) Tatang Sutisna
Kitman	(Indonesia) Fikri Apriansyah
Video analysts	(Indonesia) Atreeyu Andrey Pamungkas (Indonesia) Pandu Satiagraha Effendi

Last updated: 15 April 2023
Source: Liga Indonesia Baru

== Management and officials ==
Position	Staff
Club manager	(Indonesia) Umuh Muchtar
Club secretary	(Indonesia) Irfan Suryadireja
Media officer	(Indonesia) Rivan Mandala Putera

Last updated: 15 April 2023
Source: Liga Indonesia Baru

== Transfers ==
=== Transfers in ===
Date	Pos.	Name	From	Fee	Ref.
5 April 2022	DF	(Indonesia) Rachmat Irianto	(Indonesia) Persebaya	Free transfer	
5 April 2022	MF	(Indonesia) Ricky Kambuaya	(Indonesia) Persebaya	Free transfer	
13 April 2022	FW	(Brazil) Ciro Alves	(Indonesia) Persikabo	Free transfer	
16 April 2022	DF	(Indonesia) David Rumakiek	(Indonesia) Persipura	Free transfer	
17 April 2022	GK	(Indonesia) Fitrul Dwi Rustapa	(Indonesia) Persipura	Free transfer	
26 April 2022	DF	(Indonesia) Eriyanto	(Indonesia) Persis	Free transfer	
28 May 2022	GK	(Indonesia) Reky Rahayu	(Indonesia) Kalteng Putra	Free transfer	
11 June 2022	DF	(Philippines) Daisuke Sato	(Thailand) Ratchaburi Mitr Phol	Free transfer	
26 January 2023	DF	(Indonesia) Rezaldi Hehanussa	(Indonesia) Persija	Undisclosed	
31 January 2023	GK	(Indonesia) Mario Londok	(Indonesia) Persipura	Free transfer	

=== Transfers out ===
Date	Pos.	Name	To	Fee	Ref.
2 April 2022	MF	(Indonesia) Esteban Vizcarra	(Indonesia) Madura United (Note: Joined on 28 April 2022.)	Free transfer	
3 April 2022	DF	(Indonesia) Indra Mustafa	(Indonesia) Borneo Samarinda (Note: Joined on 5 April 2022.)	Free transfer	
4 April 2022	MF	(Indonesia) Gian Zola	(Indonesia) Arema (Note: Joined on 5 April 2022.)	Free transfer	
4 April 2022	MF	(Indonesia) Agung Mulyadi	(Indonesia) Persikabo 1973 (Note: Joined on 8 June 2022.)	Free transfer	
6 April 2022	DF	(Indonesia) Supardi Nasir	(Indonesia) PSMS (Note: Joined on 30 May 2022.)	Free transfer	
6 April 2022	DF	(Indonesia) Mario Jardel	(Indonesia) Persita (Note: Joined on 10 May 2022.)	Free transfer	
6 April 2022	FW	(Brazil) Bruno Cantanhede	(Qatar) Al-Mesaimeer	Free transfer	
9 April 2022	MF	(Indonesia) Puja Abdillah	(Indonesia) Persikab	Free transfer	
11 April 2022	GK	(Indonesia) Dhika Bayangkara	(Indonesia) Persita (Note: Joined on 25 April 2022.)	Free transfer	
12 April 2022	DF	(Indonesia) Ardi Idrus	(Indonesia) Bali United (Note: Joined on 10 May 2022.)	Free transfer	
14 April 2022	MF	(Palestine) Mohammed Rashid	(Egypt) Smouha	Free transfer	
16 April 2022	GK	(Indonesia) Muhammad Natshir	(Indonesia) Dewa United (Note: Joined on 25 April 2022.)	Free transfer	
19 April 2022	GK	(Indonesia) Aqil Savik	(Indonesia) Bhayangkara	Free transfer	
12 May 2022	MF	(Indonesia) Syafril Lestaluhu	(Indonesia) Persikabo 1973 (Note: Joined on 27 May 2022.)	Free transfer	

=== Loans out ===
Start date	Pos.	Name	From	End date	Ref.
11 January 2023	DF	(Indonesia) Bayu Fiqri	(Indonesia) PSIS	30 April 2023	

== Pre-season and friendlies ==
=== Piala Presiden ===
==== Group stage ====
Persib were drawn into Group C, along with Bali United, Bhayangkara, and Persebaya.

Pos	Team	Pld	W	D	L	GF	GA	GD	Pts	Qualification
1	Persib (H)	3	2	1	0	5	2	+3	7	Advance to knockout stage
2	Bhayangkara	3	1	1	1	3	3	0	4 (Note: Head-to-head points: Bhayangkara 3, Bali United 0.)	Advance to knockout stage
3	Bali United	3	1	1	1	3	3	0	4	
4	Persebaya	3	0	1	2	2	5	−3	1	

Source: Piala Presiden
Rules for classification: 1) Points; 2) Head-to-head; 3) Goal difference; 4) Goals scored; 5) Fair play; 6) Drawing.
(H) Hosts
Notes:

12 June 2022 1	Persib	1–1	Bali United	Bandung, West Java
20:30 WIB	da Silva 80'	Report	Novri 3'; Bessa (red card) 20'	Stadium: Gelora Bandung Lautan Api Stadium; Attendance: 15,652; Referee: Fariq Hitaba (Yogyakarta)

17 June 2022 2	Persebaya	1–3	Persib	Bandung, West Java
20:30 WIB	Lelis 17' (pen.)	Report	Igbonefo 25'; Kuipers 35'; Ciro 90+3'	Stadium: Gelora Bandung Lautan Api Stadium; Attendance: 37,872; Referee: Armyn Dwi Suryathin (South Sumatra)

21 June 2022 3	Bhayangkara	0–1	Persib	Bandung, West Java
20:30 WIB		Report	da Silva 35'	Stadium: Si Jalak Harupat Stadium; Attendance: 0 Referee: Dwi Purba (Central Java)

==== Knockout stage ====
After finishing top of Group C, Persib faced Group A runners-up PSS in the quarter-finals.

1 July 2022 Quarter-finals	Persib	1–1 (a.e.t.) (2–4 p)	PSS	Bandung, West Java
20:30 WIB	Klok 85' (pen.)	Report	Boaz 53'	Stadium: Si Jalak Harupat Stadium; Attendance: 0 Referee: Yeni Krisdianto (East Java)
	Penalties
	Klok (penalty scored); Erwin (penalty missed); Irianto (penalty scored); Jufriyanto (penalty missed)		(penalty scored) Zé Valente; (penalty scored) Nirwanto; (penalty scored) Hambali Tolib; (penalty scored) Rifky

=== Friendlies ===
5 June 2022 Friendly	Persib (Indonesia)	6–1	(Singapore) Tanjong Pagar United	Batam, Riau Islands
15:15 WIB	Walian 16', 36'; Ciro 63'; da Silva 69', 72'; Febri 90+2' (pen.)	Report	Nizam 40'	Stadium: Gelora Citramas Stadium

== Competitions ==
=== Overall record ===
Competition	First match	Last match	Starting round	Final position	Record							
Competition	First match	Last match	Starting round	Final position	Pld	W	D	L	GF	GA	GD	Win %
Liga 1	24 July 2022	15 April 2023	Matchday 1	3rd	34	19	5	10	54	50	+4	55.88
Total					34	19	5	10	54	50	+4	55.88

Source: Competitions

=== Liga 1 ===
==== League table ====
Pos	Team	Pld	W	D	L	GF	GA	GD	Pts	Qualification or relegation
1	PSM (C)	34	22	9	3	63	28	+35	75	Qualification for the additional play-offs for AFC Club Competition and Qualification for the 2023–24 AFC Cup Play-Offs
2	Persija	34	20	6	8	47	27	+20	66	
3	Persib	34	19	5	10	54	50	+4	62	
4	Borneo Samarinda	34	16	9	9	64	40	+24	57	
5	Bali United	34	16	6	12	67	53	+14	54	Qualification for the additional play-offs for AFC Club Competition and Qualification for the 2023–24 AFC Champions League Preliminary Round 1

Source: BRI Liga 1 2022–23
Rules for classification: 1) Points; 2) Head-to-head points; 3) Head-to-head goal difference; 4) Head-to-head goals scored; 5) Head-to-head away goals scored; 6) Goal difference; 7) Goals scored; 8) Fair-play points; 9) Draw.
(C) Champions

==== Matches ====
24 July 2022 1	Bhayangkara	2–2	Persib	Bekasi, West Java
20:45 WIB	Ezzejjari 38'; Indra Kahfi (yellow card) 62'; Sani 85'; Hargianto (yellow card) 86'	Report	Irianto 42'; Frets 48'; Sato (yellow card) 84'	Stadium: Wibawa Mukti Stadium; Attendance: 21,400; Referee: Armyn Dwi Suryathin (South Sumatra)

30 July 2022 2	Persib	1–3	Madura United	Bandung, West Java
15:30 WIB	Erwin (yellow card) 14'; da Silva 17'	Report	Vizcarra (yellow card) 11'; Lulinha 60', (yellow card) 71'; Pedro Henrique 69', (yellow card) 69'; Jajá (yellow card) 81', (goal) 83'	Stadium: Gelora Bandung Lautan Api Stadium; Attendance: 5,410; Referee: Abdullah (Aceh)

7 August 2022 3	Borneo Samarinda	4–1	Persib	Samarinda, East Kalimantan
17:00 WITA	Fajar 17'; Hardianto (yellow card) 22'; Terens 23'; Lilipaly 64'; Pato 87'	Report	da Silva 9', (yellow card) 74'; Robi (yellow card) 32'; Kuipers (yellow card) 45'	Stadium: Segiri Stadium; Attendance: 4,952; Referee: Steven Yubel Poli (North Sulawesi)

13 August 2022 4	Persib	2–1	PSIS	Bandung, West Java
16:00 WIB	da Silva 24' (pen.), 65'; Sato (yellow card) 62'; Ciro (yellow card) 86'; Kambuaya (yellow card) 90+2'	Report	Cantillana (yellow card) 17'; Marukawa 30'; Rumbino (yellow card) 60'	Stadium: Gelora Bandung Lautan Api Stadium; Attendance: 5,358; Referee: Totok Firtrianto (North Sulawesi)

19 August 2022 5	PSS	0–1	Persib	Sleman, Yogyakarta
20:30 WIB	Duarte (yellow card) 60'; Ayoub (yellow card) 81'	Report	da Silva 7'; Kuipers (yellow card) 40'; Kambuaya (yellow card) 66'	Stadium: Maguwoharjo Stadium; Attendance: 27,638; Referee: Adi Riyanto (Central Java)

23 August 2022 6	Persib	2–3	Bali United	Bandung, West Java
15:30 WIB	Jufriyanto (yellow card) 39'; Kambuaya (yellow card) 45+4'; Kuipers (yellow card) 48'; da Silva 62' (pen.); Erwin 89'	Report	Yabes (yellow card) 14'; Mbarga 25'; Nadeo (yellow card) 43' (yellow-red card) 45'; Spasojević 44'; Bessa (yellow card) 68'; Rahmat 80'	Stadium: Gelora Bandung Lautan Api Stadium; Attendance: 7,927; Referee: M. Erfan Efendi (East Java)

29 August 2022 7	PSM	5–1	Persib	Parepare, South Sulawesi
21:00 WITA	Yk. Sayuri 2', 50', (yellow card) 51'; Sananta 18', 44'; Arfan (yellow card) 43'; Pluim 64'	Report	Klok 31'; Bayu (yellow card) 39'; Wirawan (yellow card) 62'	Stadium: Gelora B.J. Habibie Stadium; Attendance: 15,743; Referee: Moch Adung (Jakarta)

4 September 2022 8	Persib	2–1	RANS Nusantara	Bandung, West Java
15:30 WIB	da Silva 26', (yellow card) 45'; Ciro (yellow card) 32', (goal) 45' (pen.); Jufriyanto (yellow card) 66'; Bayu (yellow card) 84'	Report	Wander Luiz 82'	Stadium: Gelora Bandung Lautan Api Stadium; Attendance: 13,592; Referee: David Son Sasube (North Sulawesi)

11 September 2022 9	Arema	1–2	Persib	Malang, East Java
15:30 WIB	Dedik 45'; Jayus (yellow card) 48'; Figo (yellow card) 80'; Yamaguchi (yellow card) 86'	Report	Sato (yellow card) 16'; Beckham 49'; Klok (yellow card) 66'; da Silva (yellow card) 68', (goal) 88'; Zalnando (yellow card) 79'; Dedi (yellow card) 85'	Stadium: Kanjuruhan Stadium; Attendance: 21,931; Referee: Muhammad Khisfan (Bengkulu)

16 September 2022 10	Persib	5–2	Barito Putera	Bandung, West Java
15:30 WIB	da Silva 5'; Ciro 31', 44'; Kuipers 45'; Beckham (yellow card) 57'; Henhen 68', (yellow card) 82'	Report	Ott (yellow card) 25'; Kahar (yellow card) 52', (goal) 60'; Buyung Ismu 55', (yellow card) 65'; Bagas Kaffa (yellow card) 86'	Stadium: Gelora Bandung Lautan Api Stadium; Attendance: 11,621; Referee: Tommi Manggopa (North Sulawesi)

7 December 2022 12	Persik	0–3	Persib	Surakarta, Central Java
18:15 WIB		Report	da Silva 12', 19'; Febri 69'; Zalnando (yellow card) 76'	Stadium: Manahan Stadium; Attendance: 0 Referee: Steven Yubel Poli (North Sulawesi)

10 December 2022 13	Persib	2–1	Persebaya	Semarang, Central Java
15:15 WIB	Kuipers (yellow card) 15'; Ciro 64'; da Silva 75'	Report	Lelis 44'; Vidal (yellow card) 72'	Stadium: Jatidiri Stadium; Attendance: 0 Referee: Armyn Dwi Suryathin (South Sumatra)

14 December 2022 14	Dewa United	1–1	Persib	Surakarta, Central Java
20:15 WIB	Bhudiar (yellow card) 40'; Jufriyanto 43' (o.g.); Rangga (yellow card) 61'; Ichsan (yellow card) 69'; Ramos (yellow card) 90+5'	Report	Robi (yellow card) 35'; da Silva 49'; Jufriyanto (yellow card) 90'; Dedi (yellow card) 90'	Stadium: Manahan Stadium; Attendance: 0 Referee: Fariq Hitaba (Yogyakarta)

18 December 2022 15	Persis	1–2	Persib	Bantul, Yogyakarta
16:15 WIB	Bachdim 55'; Sutanto (yellow card) 79'	Report	Sato (yellow card) 34'; Ciro 68'; Robi (yellow card) 73'; da Silva (yellow card) 75'; Walian 90'	Stadium: Sultan Agung Stadium; Attendance: 0 Referee: Tabrani (East Java)

21 December 2022 16	Persib	1–0	Persita	Bantul, Yogyakarta
18:00 WIB	Robi (yellow card) 8'; Arif 45' (o.g.); Arsan (yellow card) 50'	Report	Fergonzi (yellow card) 78'; Wildan (yellow card) 90'	Stadium: Sultan Agung Stadium; Attendance: 0 Referee: Sance Lawita (North Sulawesi)

24 December 2022 17	Persikabo 1973	1–1	Persib	Surakarta, Central Java
18:00 WIB	Roni (yellow card) 45'; Tocantins 61'	Report	Kuipers (yellow card) 42'; Sato 90'	Stadium: Manahan Stadium; Attendance: 0 Referee: Heru Cahyono (Jakarta)

11 January 2023 11	Persib	1–0	Persija	Bandung, West Java
15:30 WIB	Dedi (yellow card) 5'; Sato (yellow card) 54'; Ciro 63', (yellow card) 90+3'	Report	Abimanyu (yellow card) 5'; Rio (yellow card) 42'; Ferarri (yellow card) 74'; Resky (yellow card) 90'	Stadium: Gelora Bandung Lautan Api Stadium; Attendance: 21,257; Referee: Steven Yubel Poli (North Sulawesi)

20 January 2023 19	Madura United	0–1	Persib	Pamekasan, East Java
18:30 WIB		Report	Kuipers (yellow card) 48' (yellow-red card) 86'; da Silva 79'; Igbonefo (yellow card) 87'	Stadium: Gelora Ratu Pamelingan Stadium; Attendance: 5,453; Referee: Dwi Purba (Central Java)

26 January 2023 20	Persib	1–0	Borneo Samarinda	Bogor, West Java
15:30 WIB	da Silva 7'; Kambuaya (yellow card) 8' (yellow-red card) 45'; Sato (yellow card) 19'; Beckham (yellow card) 45'; Kakang (yellow card) 66'	Report	Hirose (yellow card) 32' (yellow-red card) 69'	Stadium: Pakansari Stadium; Attendance: 0 Referee: Yeni Krisdianto (East Java)

31 January 2023 21	PSIS	1–3	Persib	Semarang, Central Java
16:30 WIB	Marukawa 65'	Report	Klok 18'; Ciro 36'; Kakang (yellow card) 54'; da Silva 80'	Stadium: Jatidiri Stadium; Attendance: 11,928; Referee: Armyn Dwi Suryathin (South Sumatra)

5 February 2023 22	Persib	2–0	PSS	Bandung, West Java
15:00 WIB	Ciro 27', 40'	Report	Ayoub (yellow card) 20'; Cantillana (yellow card) 20'; Tuharea (yellow card) 44'; Gomes (yellow card) 54'; Nurdiansyah (yellow card) 90'	Stadium: Gelora Bandung Lautan Api Stadium; Attendance: 18,868; Referee: Faulur Rosy (Aceh)

10 February 2023 23	Bali United	1–1	Persib	Sleman, Yogyakarta
17:00 WIB	Bessa (yellow card) 23'; Novri (yellow card) 48'; Ricky (yellow card) 74'; Mbarga 79', (yellow card) 88'; Tupamahu (yellow card) 90'	Report	Kuipers (yellow card) 24'; da Silva (yellow card) 29', (goal) 89'; Klok (yellow card) 49'; Sato (yellow card) 90'	Stadium: Maguwoharjo Stadium; Attendance: 0 Referee: Fariq Hitaba (Yogyakarta)

14 February 2023 24	Persib	1–2	PSM	Bogor, West Java
15:00 WIB	Walian (yellow card) 35'; Jufriyanto 45'	Report	Sananta 54'; Yn. Sayuri 66'	Stadium: Pakansari Stadium; Attendance: 10,546; Referee: Dwi Purba (Central Java)

19 February 2023 25	RANS Nusantara	1–3	Persib	Bogor, West Java
15:00 WIB	Fadilla (yellow card) 38'; Mbombo 60'	Report	da Silva 7' (pen.); Ciro 35'; Pasamba 54' (o.g.); Dedi (yellow card) 61'; Teja (yellow card) 90'	Stadium: Pakansari Stadium; Attendance: 8,238; Referee: Ruli

23 February 2023 26	Persib	1–0	Arema	Bogor, West Java
15:00 WIB	Kambuaya (yellow card) 16'; Kuipers (yellow card) 43'; Beckham (yellow card) 44'; Klok 66'; Ciro (yellow card) 67'	Report	Joko (yellow card) 19'; Rizky Dwi (yellow card) 39'; Camará (yellow card) 59'	Stadium: Pakansari Stadium; Attendance: 0 Referee: Faulur Rosy (Aceh)

27 February 2023 27	Barito Putera	2–1	Persib	Banjar, South Kalimantan
16:00 WITA	Noma (yellow card) 33'; Alves 65'; Tocantins 79'	Report	da Silva 20'; Teja (red card) 44'; Jufriyanto (yellow card) 86'	Stadium: Demang Lehman Stadium; Attendance: 3,917; Referee: Sance Lawita (North Sulawesi)

8 March 2023 29	Persib	0–2	Persik	Bogor, West Java
15:00 WIB	Kuipers (yellow card) 27'; Beckham (yellow card) 53'; da Silva (yellow card) 67'; Sato (yellow card) 69'; Irianto (yellow card) 84'	Report	Silva (yellow card) 20'; H. Hehanussa 34'; Vava (yellow card) 45'; Pahabol (yellow card) 76'; Khanafi 88'	Stadium: Pakansari Stadium; Attendance: 0 Referee: Steven Yubel Poli (North Sulawesi)

13 March 2023 30	Persebaya	2–2	Persib	Gresik, East Java
15:00 WIB	Supriadi 23'; Zé Valente 32'; Lauhin (yellow card) 65'	Report	Lauhin 77' (o.g.); da Silva 83'; Sato (yellow card) 89'; Walian (yellow card) 90'	Stadium: Gelora Joko Samudro Stadium; Attendance: 5,500; Referee: Fariq Hitaba (Yogyakarta)

20 March 2023 31	Persib	2–1	Dewa United	Bogor, West Java
15:00 WIB	Klok 12'; Robi (yellow card) 73', (goal) 75'; R. Hehanussa (yellow card) 80'	Report	Frendi (yellow card) 6' (yellow-red card) 46'; Mitrevski 35'; Miftah (yellow card) 56'	Stadium: Pakansari Stadium; Attendance: 1,963; Referee: Pipin Indra Pratama (East Java)

24 March 2023 18	Persib	2–1	Bhayangkara	Bogor, West Java
20:30 WIB	Sato 37'; Kakang (yellow card) 58'; da Silva 66'	Report	Fatchurohman (yellow card) 17'; Mier (yellow card) 68'; Martins 73'; Andik (yellow card) 85'	Stadium: Pakansari Stadium; Attendance: 988; Referee: Aprisman Aranda (West Sumatra)

31 March 2023 28	Persija	2–0	Persib	Bekasi, West Java
20:30 WIB	Simanjuntak 45', (yellow card) 75'; Abimanyu (yellow card) 45+3'; Ferarri (yellow card) 50'; Krmenčík 72', (yellow card) 81'; Nico (yellow card) 89'; Sjahbandi (yellow card) 90+6'	Report	Dedi (yellow card) 27'; Sato (yellow card) 35'; Kuipers (yellow card) 45'; Igbonefo (yellow card) 48'; Kambuaya (yellow card) 64'; Walian (yellow card) 79'	Stadium: Patriot Candrabhaga Stadium; Attendance: 24,961; Referee: Iwan Sukoco (East Java)

4 April 2023 32	Persib	3–1	Persis	Bogor, West Java
20:30 WIB	da Silva 45' (pen.), 62'; Klok (yellow card) 59'; Frets 79'; Kakang (yellow card) 85'	Report	Jaime 26', (yellow card) 44'; Rian (yellow card) 45'; Eky (yellow card) 52'; Sutanto (yellow card) 69'	Stadium: Pakansari Stadium; Attendance: 2,377; Referee: Hamim Tohari (East Java)

9 April 2023 33	Persita	4–0	Persib	Tangerang, Banten
20:30 WIB	Irsyad 11', 73'; Fergonzi 24'; Andrean (yellow card) 37'; Toha (yellow card) 58'; Vidal 79', (yellow card) 80'	Report	Kuipers (yellow card) 71'; Sato (yellow card) 78'; Robi (yellow card) 81'	Stadium: Indomilk Arena; Attendance: 5,223; Referee: Fariq Hitaba (Yogyakarta)

15 April 2023 34	Persib	1–4	Persikabo 1973	Bandung, West Java
20:30 WIB	Kakang (yellow card) 68'; da Silva 70', (yellow card) 73'; Klok (yellow card) 90+3'	Report	Lucão 40'; Lucky 59'; Sílvio 61'; Pedro Henrique 85', (yellow card) 86'	Stadium: Gelora Bandung Lautan Api Stadium; Attendance: 23,579; Referee: Agung Setiawan (Central Java)

== Team statistics ==
=== Appearances and goals ===
No.	Pos.	Player	Liga 1		Total	
No.	Pos.	Player	Apps.	Goals	Apps.	Goals
1	GK	(Indonesia) Fitrul Dwi Rustapa	2	0	2	0
2	DF	(Netherlands) Nick Kuipers	29	1	29	1
3	DF	(Indonesia) Eriyanto	0	0	0	0
4	DF	(Indonesia) Bayu Fiqri	2+1	0	2+1	0
5	DF	(Indonesia) Kakang Rudianto	7+4	0	7+4	0
6	MF	(Indonesia) Robi Darwis	12+5	1	12+5	1
7	MF	(Indonesia) Beckham Putra	17+8	1	17+8	1
8	FW	(Indonesia) Abdul Aziz	5+15	0	5+15	0
10	FW	(Indonesia) Marc Klok	25	4	25	4
11	MF	(Indonesia) Dedi Kusnandar	22+10	0	22+10	0
12	DF	(Indonesia) Henhen Herdiana	17+3	1	17+3	1
13	MF	(Indonesia) Febri Hariyadi	8+11	1	8+11	1
14	GK	(Indonesia) Teja Paku Alam	21	0	21	0
15	GK	(Indonesia) I Made Wirawan	4+2	0	4+2	0
16	DF	(Indonesia) Achmad Jufriyanto	16+8	1	16+8	1
17	MF	(Indonesia) Ferdiansyah Cecep	0+5	0	0+5	0
18	DF	(Indonesia) David Rumakiek	0+1	0	0+1	0
19	FW	(Brazil) David da Silva	33	24	33	24
21	FW	(Indonesia) Frets Butuan	17+8	2	17+8	2
26	GK	(Indonesia) Satrio Azhar	0	0	0	0
27	DF	(Indonesia) Zalnando	5+4	0	5+4	0
30	FW	(Indonesia) Ezra Walian	9+13	1	9+13	1
32	DF	(Indonesia) Victor Igbonefo	13+2	0	13+2	0
34	GK	(Indonesia) Reky Rahayu	7+2	0	7+2	0
53	MF	(Indonesia) Rachmat Irianto	24+1	1	24+1	1
55	MF	(Indonesia) Ricky Kambuaya	13+9	0	13+9	0
56	DF	(Indonesia) Rezaldi Hehanussa	5+7	0	5+7	0
66	DF	(Philippines) Daisuke Sato	31	2	31	2
70	MF	(Indonesia) Arsan Makarin	1+4	0	1+4	0
77	FW	(Brazil) Ciro Alves	29+2	10	29+2	10
93	MF	(Indonesia) Erwin Ramdani	2+12	1	2+12	1
99	FW	(Indonesia) Ridwan Ansori	0	0	0	0

Source: Competitions

=== Disciplinary record ===
No.	Pos.	Player	Liga 1			Total		
No.	Pos.	Player	Yellow card	Second yellow card	Red card	Yellow card	Second yellow card	Red card
1	GK	(Indonesia) Fitrul Dwi Rustapa	0	0	0	0	0	0
2	DF	(Netherlands) Nick Kuipers	10	1	0	10	1	0
3	DF	(Indonesia) Eriyanto	0	0	0	0	0	0
4	DF	(Indonesia) Bayu Fiqri	2	0	0	2	0	0
5	DF	(Indonesia) Kakang Rudianto	5	0	0	5	0	0
6	MF	(Indonesia) Robi Darwis	6	0	0	6	0	0
7	MF	(Indonesia) Beckham Putra	4	0	0	4	0	0
8	FW	(Indonesia) Abdul Aziz	0	0	0	0	0	0
10	FW	(Indonesia) Marc Klok	4	0	0	4	0	0
11	MF	(Indonesia) Dedi Kusnandar	5	0	0	5	0	0
12	DF	(Indonesia) Henhen Herdiana	1	0	0	1	0	0
13	MF	(Indonesia) Febri Hariyadi	0	0	0	0	0	0
14	GK	(Indonesia) Teja Paku Alam	1	0	1	1	0	1
15	GK	(Indonesia) I Made Wirawan	1	0	0	1	0	0
16	DF	(Indonesia) Achmad Jufriyanto	4	0	0	4	0	0
17	MF	(Indonesia) Ferdiansyah Cecep	0	0	0	0	0	0
18	DF	(Indonesia) David Rumakiek	0	0	0	0	0	0
19	FW	(Brazil) David da Silva	7	0	0	7	0	0
21	FW	(Indonesia) Frets Butuan	0	0	0	0	0	0
26	GK	(Indonesia) Satrio Azhar	0	0	0	0	0	0
27	DF	(Indonesia) Zalnando	2	0	0	2	0	0
30	FW	(Indonesia) Ezra Walian	3	0	0	3	0	0
32	DF	(Indonesia) Victor Igbonefo	2	0	0	2	0	0
34	GK	(Indonesia) Reky Rahayu	0	0	0	0	0	0
53	MF	(Indonesia) Rachmat Irianto	1	0	0	1	0	0
55	MF	(Indonesia) Ricky Kambuaya	5	1	0	5	1	0
56	DF	(Indonesia) Rezaldi Hehanussa	1	0	0	1	0	0
66	DF	(Philippines) Daisuke Sato	11	0	0	11	0	0
70	MF	(Indonesia) Arsan Makarin	1	0	0	1	0	0
77	FW	(Brazil) Ciro Alves	4	0	0	4	0	0
93	MF	(Indonesia) Erwin Ramdani	1	0	0	1	0	0
99	FW	(Indonesia) Ridwan Ansori	0	0	0	0	0	0

Source: Competitions
