= 2023–24 Persib Bandung season =

Indonesian football club season

Persib Bandung
2023–24 season
- Owner: PT Persib Bandung Bermartabat
- CEO: Glenn Sugita
- Head coach: Luis Milla (until 14 July); Yaya Sunarya (caretaker, until 26 July); Bojan Hodak (since 26 July)
- Stadium: Gelora Bandung Lautan Api Stadium (until February); Si Jalak Harupat Stadium (from February)
- Liga 1: 2nd
- Liga 1 Championship Series: 1st
- Top goalscorer: David da Silva (30)
- Highest home attendance: 24,925 vs. Persik; 10 December 2023
- Lowest home attendance: 6,207 vs. Bhayangkara; 28 March 2024
- Average home league attendance: 12,591
- Biggest win: 5–0 vs. Persita (H); 1 October 2023
- Biggest defeat: 2–4 vs. PSM (A); 22 July 2023; 0–2 vs. Persik (H); 10 December 2023
Home colours	Away colours	Third colours

The 2023–24 season was the 64th season in the history of Persib Bandung, and the club's 27th consecutive season in the top-flight of Indonesian football since it became fully professional.

Persib finished second in the regular series before winning their third professional league title and the first in a decade after defeating Madura United 6–1 on aggregate in the championship series finals.

== Squad information ==
Note: Age and contract details as of 30 June 2024

No.	Name	Nat.	Date of birth (age)	Height	Signed from	Year signed	Contract ends	Ref.
Goalkeepers
1	Fitrul Dwi Rustapa	(Indonesia)	5 June 1995 (age 29)	1.77 m	(Indonesia) Persipura	2022	2024	
14	Teja Paku Alam	(Indonesia)	14 September 1994 (age 29)	1.77 m	(Indonesia) Semen Padang	2020	2027	
17	Sheva Sanggasi	(Indonesia)	1 May 2004 (age 20)	1.82 m	Youth academy	2023		
29	Kevin Ray Mendoza	(Philippines)	29 September 1994 (age 29)	1.87 m	(Malaysia) Kuala Lumpur City	2023	2025	
34	Reky Rahayu	(Indonesia)	8 May 1993 (age 31)	1.76 m	(Indonesia) Kalteng Putra	2022	2026	
Defenders
2	Nick Kuipers	(Netherlands)	8 October 1992 (age 31)	1.93 m	(Netherlands) ADO Den Haag	2019	2025	
5	Kakang Rudianto	(Indonesia)	2 February 2003 (age 21)	1.85 m	Youth academy	2020	2026	
12	Henhen Herdiana	(Indonesia)	10 September 1995 (age 28)	1.69 m	Youth academy	2017	2027	
16	Achmad Jufriyanto	(Indonesia)	7 February 1987 (age 37)	1.80 m	(Malaysia) Kuala Lumpur	2019	2024	
22	Alberto Rodríguez	(Spain)	31 December 1992 (age 31)	1.91 m	(Spain) Lugo	2023	2024+1	
27	Zalnando	(Indonesia)	25 December 1996 (age 27)	1.76 m	(Indonesia) Sriwijaya	2019	2026	
32	Victor Igbonefo	(Indonesia)	10 October 1985 (age 38)	1.83 m	(Thailand) PTT Rayong	2020	2024	
56	Rezaldi Hehanussa	(Indonesia)	7 November 1995 (age 28)	1.78 m	(Indonesia) Persija	2023	2026	
97	Edo Febriansah	(Indonesia)	25 July 1997 (age 26)	1.78 m	(Indonesia) RANS Nusantara	2023	2025	
Midfielders
7	Beckham Putra	(Indonesia)	29 October 2001 (age 22)	1.64 m	Youth academy	2018	2025	
8	Abdul Aziz	(Indonesia)	14 February 1994 (age 30)	1.72 m	(Indonesia) PSMS	2019	2026	
11	Dedi Kusnandar	(Indonesia)	23 July 1991 (age 32)	1.75 m	(Malaysia) Sabah	2017	2025	
13	Febri Hariyadi	(Indonesia)	19 February 1996 (age 29)	1.68 m	Youth academy	2015	2026	
18	Ferdiansyah Cecep	(Indonesia)	15 July 2003 (age 20)	1.72 m	Youth academy	2021	2026	
23	Marc Klok (captain)	(Indonesia)	20 April 1993 (age 31)	1.77 m	(Indonesia) Persija	2021	2025	
53	Rachmat Irianto	(Indonesia)	3 September 1999 (age 24)	1.73 m	(Indonesia) Persebaya	2022	2025	
70	Arsan Makarin	(Indonesia)	8 February 2001 (age 23)	1.66 m	(Indonesia) Bandung United	2022	2024	
93	Stefano Beltrame	(Italy)	8 February 1993 (age 31)	1.83 m	(Portugal) Marítimo	2023	2024	
96	Ryan Kurnia	(Indonesia)	26 August 1996 (age 27)	1.80 m	(Indonesia) Persikabo 1973	2023	2025	
Forwards
19	David da Silva	(Brazil)	12 November 1989 (age 35)	1.83 m	(Malaysia) Terengganu	2021	2024	
30	Ezra Walian	(Indonesia)	22 October 1997 (age 26)	1.82 m	(Indonesia) PSM	2021	2024	
77	Ciro Alves	(Brazil)	18 April 1989 (age 35)	1.75 m	(Indonesia) Persikabo 1973	2022	2025	
Out on loan
6	Robi Darwis	(Indonesia)	22 August 2003 (age 20)	1.70 m	Youth academy	2021	2026	
10	Tyronne del Pino	(Spain)	27 January 1991 (age 33)	1.82 m	(Thailand) Nakhon Ratchasima	2023	2025	
20	Eriyanto	(Indonesia)	12 March 1996 (age 28)	1.68 m	(Indonesia) Persis	2022	2024	
26	Satrio Azhar	(Indonesia)	16 May 2001 (age 23)	1.77 m	(Indonesia) Bandung United	2022	2024	
Player(s) transferred out during this season
4	Putu Gede	(Indonesia)	7 June 1995 (age 29)	1.76 m	(Indonesia) Bhayangkara	2023	2025	
15	Lévy Madinda	(Gabon)	22 June 1992 (age 32)	1.82 m	(Malaysia) Johor Darul Ta'zim	2023 (loan)	2023	
21	Frets Butuan	(Indonesia)	4 June 1996 (age 28)	1.67 m	(Indonesia) PSMS	2019	2026	
66	Daisuke Sato	(Philippines)	20 September 1994 (age 29)	1.70 m	(Thailand) Ratchaburi Mitr Phol	2022	2025	

== Coaching staff ==
Position	Staff
Head coach	(Croatia) Bojan Hodak
Assistant coach	(Croatia) Goran Paulić
Interpreter	(Indonesia) I Made Wirawan
Goalkeeping coach	(Brazil) Luizinho Passos
Fitness coaches	(Croatia) Miro Petric (Indonesia) Yaya Sunarya
Club doctor	(Indonesia) Mohammad Raffi Ghani
Physiotherapist	(Indonesia) Benidektus Adi Prianto
Masseurs	(Indonesia) Iyang Mulyana (Indonesia) Tatang Sutisna
Kitman	(Indonesia) Fikri Apriansyah

Last updated: 31 May 2024
Source: Liga Indonesia Baru

== Management and officials ==
Position	Staff
Club manager	(Indonesia) Umuh Muchtar
Club secretary	(Indonesia) Irfan Suryadireja
Media officer	(Indonesia) Muhammad Jatnika Sadili
Video technical analyst	(Indonesia) Atreeyu Andrey Pamungkas

Last updated: 31 May 2024
Source: Liga Indonesia Baru

== Transfers ==
=== Transfers in ===
Date	Pos.	Name	From	Fee	Ref.
3 May 2023	MF	(Indonesia) Ryan Kurnia	(Indonesia) Persikabo 1973	Free transfer	
8 May 2023	DF	(Indonesia) Edo Febriansah	(Indonesia) RANS Nusantara	Free transfer	
13 May 2023	DF	(Indonesia) Putu Gede	(Indonesia) Bhayangkara	Free transfer	
28 May 2023	MF	(Spain) Tyronne del Pino	(Thailand) Nakhon Ratchasima	Free transfer	
11 June 2023	DF	(Spain) Alberto Rodríguez	(Spain) Lugo	Free transfer	
28 November 2023	GK	(Philippines) Kevin Ray Mendoza	(Malaysia) Kuala Lumpur City	Free transfer	
28 November 2023	MF	(Italy) Stefano Beltrame	(Portugal) Marítimo	Free transfer	

=== Transfers out ===
Date	Pos.	Name	To	Fee	Ref.
28 April 2023	DF	(Indonesia) Bayu Fiqri	(Indonesia) PSIS	Free transfer	
10 May 2023	MF	(Indonesia) Erwin Ramdani	(Indonesia) RANS Nusantara	Free transfer	
16 May 2023	GK	(Indonesia) Mario Londok	(Indonesia) Barito Putera	Free transfer	
24 May 2023	DF	(Indonesia) David Rumakiek	(Indonesia) PSIS	Free transfer	
6 July 2023	MF	(Indonesia) Ricky Kambuaya	(Indonesia) Dewa United	Undisclosed	
9 November 2023	DF	(Indonesia) Putu Gede	(Indonesia) Bhayangkara	Free transfer	
28 November 2023	FW	(Indonesia) Frets Butuan	(Indonesia) Malut United	Free transfer	
30 January 2024	DF	(Philippines) Daisuke Sato	(Philippines) Davao Aguilas	Free transfer	

=== Loans in ===
Start date	Pos.	Name	From	End date	Ref.
20 July 2023	MF	(Gabon) Lévy Madinda	(Malaysia) Johor Darul Ta'zim	31 December 2023	

=== Loans out ===
Start date	Pos.	Name	To	End date	Ref.
3 June 2023	DF	(Indonesia) Henhen Herdiana	(Indonesia) Dewa United	28 November 2023	
21 August 2023	GK	(Indonesia) Satrio Azhar	(Indonesia) Sada Sumut	30 June 2024	
2 November 2023	DF	(Indonesia) Eriyanto	(Indonesia) PSPS	31 March 2024	
28 November 2023	MF	(Indonesia) Robi Darwis	(Indonesia) Dewa United	30 June 2024	
13 January 2024	MF	(Spain) Tyronne del Pino	(Thailand) Ratchaburi	30 June 2024	

== Competitions ==
=== Overall record ===
Competition	First match	Last match	Starting round	Final position	Record							
Competition	First match	Last match	Starting round	Final position	Pld	W	D	L	GF	GA	GD	Win %
Liga 1 Regular Series	2 July 2023	30 April 2024	Matchday 1	2nd	34	16	14	4	65	38	+27	47.06
Liga 1 Championship Series	14 May 2024	31 May 2024	Semi-finals	Winners	4	3	1	0	10	2	+8	75.00
Total					38	19	15	4	75	40	+35	50.00

Source: Competitions

=== Liga 1 ===
==== Regular series ====
===== League table =====
Pos	Team	Pld	W	D	L	GF	GA	GD	Pts	Qualification or relegation
1	Borneo Samarinda	34	21	7	6	52	31	+21	70	Qualification to the 2024–25 ASEAN Club Championship group stage and Championship Series (Note: Persija, the 2022–23 Liga 1 runners-up, qualified but declined to participate. Thus, their spot was given to Borneo Samarinda, the 2023–24 Liga 1 regular series premiers.)
2	Persib (C)	34	16	14	4	65	38	+27	62	Qualification to the 2024–25 AFC Champions League Two group stage and Championship Series
3	Bali United	34	17	7	10	55	43	+12	58	Qualification to the Championship Series
4	Madura United	34	15	10	9	58	45	+13	55	Qualification to the 2024–25 AFC Challenge League group stage and Championship Series
5	Dewa United	34	14	12	8	59	48	+11	54	

Source: BRI Liga 1 2023–24
Rules for classification: 1) Points; 2) Head-to-head points; 3) Head-to-head goal difference; 4) Head-to-head goals scored; 5) Goal difference; 6) Goals scored; 7) Fair-play points; 8) Draw.
(C) Champions

===== Matches =====
2 July 2023 1	Persib	1–1	Madura United	Bandung, West Java
15:00 WIB	Robi (yellow card) 66'; Rodríguez (yellow card) 74'; da Silva 79' (pen.)	Report	Jajá 5', (yellow card) 67'; Novan (yellow card) 31'; Malik (yellow card) 61'	Stadium: Gelora Bandung Lautan Api Stadium; Attendance: 14,769; Referee: Gedion Dapaherang (Jakarta)

7 July 2023 2	Arema	3–3	Persib	Gianyar, Bali
20:00 WITA	Gustavo 6', 17' (pen.), 88' (pen.); Jayus (yellow card) 59'; Almeida (yellow card) 64'; Tata (yellow card) 82'	Report	Klok (yellow card) 9'; Ciro 10', 54'; Rodríguez (yellow card) 15'; da Silva 38'; Kuipers (yellow card) 85'; Teja (yellow card) 86'	Stadium: Kapten I Wayan Dipta Stadium; Attendance: 305; Referee: Aidil Azmi (Aceh)

14 July 2023 3	Persib	2–2	Dewa United	Bandung, West Java
19:00 WIB	Febri (yellow card) 44' (yellow-red card) 68'; Irianto 62'; Beckham (yellow card) 65'; Walian 90'	Report	Kambuaya (yellow card) 15'; Rusadi 35'; Martins 58', (yellow card) 80'; Berlian (yellow card) 79'	Stadium: Gelora Bandung Lautan Api Stadium; Attendance: 6,489; Referee: Bangkit Sanjaya (Lampung)

22 July 2023 4	PSM	4–2	Persib	Parepare, South Sulawesi
20:00 WITA	Nambu 10', (yellow card) 45+2'; Dethan 28'; Everton 40'; Akbar (yellow card) 70'; Pluim (yellow card) 75'; Andy 90'	Report	Ciro (yellow card) 22'; Rodríguez (yellow card) 33'; Sato (yellow card) 43'; Putu Gede (yellow card) 67'; Fernandes 86' (o.g.); Klok 89'	Stadium: Gelora B. J. Habibie Stadium; Attendance: 4,876; Referee: Armyn Dwi Suryathin (South Sumatra)

28 July 2023 5	Persik	1–2	Persib	Kediri, East Java
19:00 WIB	Renan (yellow card) 3' (yellow-red card) 35'; Silva 4'; Supriadi (yellow card) 45+1'	Report	Igbonefo (yellow card) 30'; Walian (yellow card) 44'; Ciro 83'; Ryan 87'; Edo (yellow card) 90'	Stadium: Brawijaya Stadium; Attendance: 4,703; Referee: Agus Fauzan Arifin (Yogyakarta)

3 August 2023 6	Persib	0–0	Bali United	Bandung, West Java
19:00 WIB	Klok (yellow card) 13'; Putu Gede (yellow card) 28'; Rodríguez (yellow card) 79'	Report	Novri (yellow card) 16'	Stadium: Gelora Bandung Lautan Api Stadium; Attendance: 8,975; Referee: Gedion Dapaherang (Jakarta)

8 August 2023 7	Persis	2–1	Persib	Surakarta, Central Java
19:00 WIB	Pancar (yellow card) 21'; Sananta 33', 45'; Sutanto (yellow card) 38'; Jaime (yellow card) 42'; Bhagascara (yellow card) 75'; Kanu Helmiawan (yellow card) 90+4'	Report	Klok (yellow card) 23'; Irianto (yellow card) 27'; Ciro 32'; Edo (yellow card) 36'; Dedi (yellow card) 58'; Putu Gede (yellow card) 82' (yellow-red card) 90'	Stadium: Manahan Stadium; Attendance: 15,167; Referee: M. Erfan Efendi (East Java)

13 August 2023 8	Persib	1–1	Barito Putera	Bandung, West Java
15:00 WIB	Madinda 41'; Beckham (yellow card) 75'	Report	Murilo (yellow card) 28', (goal) 61'; Bayu (yellow card) 63'; Buyung Ismu (yellow card) 72'; Tocantins (yellow card) 88'	Stadium: Gelora Bandung Lautan Api Stadium; Attendance: 7,536; Referee: Heru Cahyono (Jakarta)

20 August 2023 9	PSIS	1–2	Persib	Semarang, Central Java
19:00 WIB	Luthfi (yellow card) 8' (yellow-red card) 42'; Freitas (yellow card) 22', (goal) 56'; Diarra (yellow card) 68'; Adi Satryo (red card) 77'; Fredyan (yellow card) 90'	Report	Kuipers (yellow card) 5'; Klok 24' (pen.), 90+2' (pen.); Sato (yellow card) 31'; Rodríguez (yellow card) 72'	Stadium: Jatidiri Stadium; Attendance: 18,785; Referee: Aidil Azmi (Aceh)

26 August 2023 10	Persib	2–1	RANS Nusantara	Bandung, West Java
19:00 WIB	Irianto (yellow card) 12'; Frets 15'; Rodríguez (yellow card) 35'; Klok 63'; Ferdiansyah (yellow card) 90+3'	Report	Erwin (yellow card) 4'; Sitanggang (yellow card) 34'; Marckho (yellow card) 44'; Tavinho 67'	Stadium: Gelora Bandung Lautan Api Stadium; Attendance: 7,212; Referee: Armyn Dwi Suryathin (South Sumatra)

2 September 2023 11	Persija	1–1	Persib	Bekasi, West Java
15:00 WIB	Hannan (yellow card) 5'; Šimić 14'; Abimanyu (yellow card) 49'; Sjahbandi (red card) 74'	Report	Irianto (yellow card) 56'; da Silva 85', (yellow card) 85'	Stadium: Patriot Chandrabhaga Stadium; Attendance: 27,920; Referee: M. Erfan Effendi (East Java)

16 September 2023 12	Persib	2–0	Persikabo 1973	Bandung, West Java
15:00 WIB	Dedi (yellow card) 24'; da Silva 49' (pen.); Sato (yellow card) 65'; Arsan (yellow card) 84'; Walian 89'; Edo (yellow card) 90+3'	Report	Varela (yellow card) 3'; Syahrul (yellow card) 5'; Yandi (yellow card) 12'; Lucky (yellow card) 84'	Stadium: Gelora Bandung Lautan Api Stadium; Attendance: 7,976; Referee: Bangkit Sanjaya (Lampung)

23 September 2023 13	Bhayangkara	1–2	Persib	Bekasi, West Java
19:00 WIB	David (yellow card) 9'; Reza (yellow card) 13'; Mier 35'; Ragil (yellow card) 90+1'	Report	da Silva 26'; Kuipers (yellow card) 87'; Ciro 90'	Stadium: Patriot Chandrabhaga Stadium; Attendance: 423; Referee: Bangkit Sanjaya (Lampung)

1 October 2023 14	Persib	5–0	Persita	Bandung, West Java
19:00 WIB	da Silva 9', 47', 51'; Edo 44'; Sato (yellow card) 62'; Frets 90'	Report		Stadium: Gelora Bandung Lautan Api Stadium; Attendance: 7,244; Referee: Armyn Dwi Suryathin (South Sumatra)

7 October 2023 15	Persebaya	2–3	Persib	Surabaya, East Java
15:00 WIB	Bruno 10', 32' (pen.)	Report	Ciro 3'; Teja (yellow card) 29'; Irianto (yellow card) 42'; da Silva 52', 70'; Walian (yellow card) 83'; Hehanussa (yellow card) 83'	Stadium: Gelora Bung Tomo Stadium; Attendance: 21,107; Referee: Rio Permana Putra (Riau)

21 October 2023 16	Borneo Samarinda	1–1	Persib	Samarinda, East Kalimantan
20:00 WITA	Leo Guntara 15'; Hirose (yellow card) 56'; Lelis (yellow card) 74'	Report	Kuipers (yellow card) 82'; Agung 87' (o.g.)	Stadium: Segiri Stadium; Attendance: 11,997; Referee: Zetman Pangaribuan (Jakarta)

28 October 2023 17	Persib	4–1	PSS	Bandung, West Java
19:00 WIB	Thales 3' (o.g.); da Silva 21'; Teja (yellow card) 54'; Frets 70'; Beckham 76'; Klok (yellow card) 83'	Report	Ayoub (yellow card) 35'; Kurniawan 37', (yellow card) 75'	Stadium: Gelora Bandung Lautan Api Stadium; Attendance: 16,100; Referee: Armyn Dwi Suryathin (South Sumatra)

1 November 2023 18	Madura United	0–1	Persib	Bangkalan, East Java
19:00 WIB	Fachruddin (yellow card) 24'; Tuharea (yellow card) 39'; Rivera (yellow card) 45'; Lulinha (yellow card) 45+2'; Jajá (yellow card) 84'	Report	Robi (yellow card) 45+1'; Kuipers (yellow card) 73', (goal) 85'	Stadium: Gelora Bangkalan Stadium; Attendance: 4,503; Referee: Candra (West Sumatra)

8 November 2023 19	Persib	2–2	Arema	Bandung, West Java
15:00 WIB	da Silva 9' (pen.); Ciro 26'; Frets (yellow card) 86'	Report	Ginanjar (yellow card) 5'; Dedik 15'; Gustavo 55'; Lokolingoy (yellow card) 63'; Figo (yellow card) 79'; Lucero (yellow card) 86'	Stadium: Gelora Bandung Lautan Api Stadium; Attendance: 24,106; Referee: Sance Lawita (North Sulawesi)

26 November 2023 20	Dewa United	1–5	Persib	Tangerang, Banten
19:00 WIB	Kambuaya (yellow card) 59'; Feby (yellow card) 65'; Zaenuri (yellow card) 74'; Berlian (yellow card) 80'; Mitrevski 88' (pen.)	Report	Ciro 5', 31', 62' (pen.); da Silva 48', 68'; Dedi (yellow card) 54'; Rodríguez (yellow card) 76'; Kakang (yellow card) 84'; Walian (yellow card) 90+5'	Stadium: Indomilk Arena; Attendance: 280; Referee: Candra (West Sumatra)

4 December 2023 21	Persib	0–0	PSM	Bandung, West Java
19:00 WIB	Dedi (yellow card) 11'; Kuipers (yellow card) 90'	Report	Yk. Sayuri (yellow card) 9'; Arfan (yellow card) 38'; Safrudin (yellow card) 44'; Salman (yellow card) 64'; Mansaray (yellow card) 84'; Ananda (yellow card) 90+1'	Stadium: Gelora Bandung Lautan Api Stadium; Attendance: 14,060; Referee: Gedion Dapaherang (Jakarta)

10 December 2023 22	Persib	0–2	Persik	Bandung, West Java
19:00 WIB	Henhen (yellow card) 24'	Report	Lyngbø (yellow card) 10'; Anderson (yellow card) 20', (goal) 59'; Renan 48' (pen.)	Stadium: Gelora Bandung Lautan Api Stadium; Attendance: 24,925; Referee: Futoshi Nakamura (Japan)

18 December 2023 23	Bali United	0–0	Persib	Gianyar, Bali
20:00 WITA	Dolah (yellow card) 3'; Kadek Agung (yellow card) 28'; Jajang (yellow card) 28' (yellow-red card) 89'; Ricky (yellow card) 45+2'; Idrus (yellow card) 90+5'	Report	Kuipers (yellow card) 28'; Hehanussa (yellow card) 45+1'; Ryan (yellow card) 86'; da Silva (yellow card) 90+1'	Stadium: Kapten I Wayan Dipta Stadium; Attendance: 10,167; Referee: Aidil Azmi (Aceh)

4 February 2024 24	Persib	2–2	Persis	Bandung, West Java
15:00 WIB	Beltrame 16'; Ciro 60'; Edo (yellow card) 75'; Arsan (yellow card) 81'	Report	Taufiq (yellow card) 56'; Messidoro (yellow card) 61', (goal) 67'; González 87'	Stadium: Gelora Bandung Lautan Api Stadium; Attendance: 20,260; Referee: Rio Permana Putra (Riau)

23 February 2024 25	Barito Putera	1–1	Persib	Bantul, Yogyakarta
19:00 WIB	Devid (yellow card) 49'; Bayu (yellow card) 66'; Yuswanto 90', (yellow card) 90'	Report	da Silva 11'; Klok (yellow card) 39'; Kuipers (yellow card) 45' (red card) 70'; Igbonefo (yellow card) 73'	Stadium: Sultan Agung Stadium; Attendance: 0 Referee: M. Erfan Efendi (East Java)

27 February 2024 26	Persib	3–0	PSIS	Bandung, West Java
19:00 WIB	Lucão 15' (o.g.); Kakang (yellow card) 23'; Beltrame 38'; da Silva 65'	Report	Zola (yellow card) 5'; Freitas (yellow card) 44'; Wahyu (yellow card) 60'	Stadium: Si Jalak Harupat Stadium; Attendance: 8,146; Referee: Heru Cahyono (Jakarta)

3 March 2024 27	RANS Nusantara	0–4	Persib	Bantul, Yogyakarta
19:00 WIB	Try (yellow card) 55'; Maruoka (yellow card) 60'; Dandi (yellow card) 90+4'	Report	Ciro 10'; da Silva 56' (pen.); Beltrame 61'; Erwin 90+4' (o.g.)	Stadium: Sultan Agung Stadium; Attendance: 0 Referee: Aprisman Aranda (West Sumatra)

9 March 2024 28	Persib	2–1	Persija	Bandung, West Java
15:00 WIB	da Silva 24', 69' (pen.); Hehanussa (yellow card) 27'; Dedi (yellow card) 45+2'; Klok (yellow card) 60'	Report	Sjahbandi (yellow card) 20'; Gajos 28'; Abimanyu (yellow card) 62'; Ridho (yellow card) 67'; Resky (yellow card) 74'	Stadium: Si Jalak Harupat Stadium; Attendance: 0 Referee: Candra (West Sumatra)

15 March 2024 29	Persikabo 1973	1–3	Persib	Gianyar, Bali
21:30 WITA	Yandi 86'	Report	da Silva 3' (pen.), 65'; Dedi (yellow card) 14' (yellow-red card) 36'; Ryan (yellow card) 15'; Klok (yellow card) 27'; Beltrame 58'	Stadium: Kapten I Wayan Dipta Stadium; Attendance: 925; Referee: Gedion Dapaherang (Jakarta)

28 March 2024 30	Persib	0–0	Bhayangkara	Bandung, West Java
20:30 WIB		Report	Salles (yellow card) 3'; Zulfahmi (yellow card) 6'; Putu Gede (yellow card) 37'	Stadium: Si Jalak Harupat Stadium; Attendance: 6,207; Referee: Aidil Azmi (Aceh)

15 April 2024 31	Persita	3–3	Persib	Gianyar, Bali
16:00 WITA	Bae (yellow card) 26'; Guseynov (yellow card) 46'; Irsyad 49'; Fergonzi 58' (pen.); Vidal (yellow card) 74'; Rontini (yellow card) 86'; Fahreza 90+5'	Report	Febri 5'; Ciro 24'; Irianto (yellow card) 57'; Hehanussa (yellow card) 63'; da Silva 90'; Adzikry (yellow card) 90+4'	Stadium: Kapten I Wayan Dipta Stadium; Attendance: 0 Referee: Tommi Manggopa (North Sulawesi)

20 April 2024 32	Persib	3–1	Persebaya	Bandung, West Java
15:00 WIB	Zalnando (yellow card) 3'; da Silva 43', 67', 87'	Report	Henrique (yellow card) 30'; Andre (yellow card) 46' (yellow-red card) 52'; Stevanović 57'; Reva Adi (yellow card) 63'	Stadium: Si Jalak Harupat Stadium; Attendance: 11,321; Referee: Sance Lawita (North Sulawesi)

25 April 2024 33	Persib	2–1	Borneo Samarinda	Bandung, West Java
19:00 WIB	Kuipers (yellow card) 7'; da Silva 21'; Ciro 70'	Report	Cadenazzi (yellow card) 10'; Dandy (yellow card) 34'; Rizky (yellow card) 53', (goal) 90'	Stadium: Si Jalak Harupat Stadium; Attendance: 11,659; Referee: Rio Permana Putra (Riau)

30 April 2024 34	PSS	1–0	Persib	Surakarta, Central Java
15:00 WIB	Ayoub (yellow card) 44' (yellow-red card) 55'; Vizcarra (yellow card) 45'; Gomes (yellow card) 71'; Riak 90+2' (pen.), (yellow card) 90+3'	Report	Beckham (yellow card) 23'; Igbonefo (yellow card) 53'; Walian (yellow card) 58'	Stadium: Manahan Stadium; Attendance: 13,549; Referee: Gedion Dapaherang (Jakarta)

==== Championship series ====
===== Semi-finals =====
14 May 2024 First leg	Bali United	1–1	Persib	Gianyar, Bali
20:00 WITA	Jefferson 82'; Jajang (yellow card) 59' (yellow-red card) 90+14'	Report	Dedi (yellow card) 45+4'; da Silva (yellow card) 61', (goal) 90+9'	Stadium: Bali United Training Center; Attendance: 500; Referee: Heru Cahyono (Jakarta)

18 May 2024 Second leg	Persib	3–0	Bali United	Bandung, West Java
19:00 WIB	Febri (yellow card) 12', (goal) 39'; Ciro 31'; Edo 70'; Hehanussa (yellow card) 75'	Report	Haudi (yellow card) 45+1'; Éber Bessa (yellow card) 82'; Lestaluhu (yellow card) 90+2'	Stadium: Si Jalak Harupat Stadium; Attendance: 21,593; Referee: Rio Permana Putra (Riau)

===== Finals =====
Having beaten Bali United, Persib reached the Liga 1 finals facing Madura United who defeated premiers Borneo Samarinda 4–2 on aggregate in the other semi-final.

26 May 2024 First leg	Persib	3–0	Madura United	Bandung, West Java
19:00 WIB	Dedi (yellow card) 43'; Ciro 70'; Beltrame (yellow card) 90+8'; Hehanussa (yellow card) 90+9'; da Silva 90+4', 90+12'	Report	Mahler (yellow card) 39'; Malik (yellow card) 45+2'; Rivera (yellow card) 55'	Stadium: Si Jalak Harupat Stadium; Attendance: 20,655; Referee: Tommi Manggopa (North Sulawesi)

31 May 2024 Second leg	Madura United	1–3	Persib	Bangkalan, East Java
19:00 WIB	Nurcahyono 90+7' (pen.)	Report	Henhen (yellow card) 58'; da Silva 60'; Klok 86'; Beckham 90+2', (yellow card) 90+3'	Stadium: Gelora Bangkalan Stadium; Attendance: 6,449; Referee: Aidil Azmi (Aceh)

== Team statistics ==
=== Appearances and goals ===
No.	Pos.	Player	Liga 1				Total	
No.	Pos.	Player	Regular series		Championship series		Total	
No.	Pos.	Player	Apps.	Goals	Apps.	Goals	Apps.	Goals
1	GK	(Indonesia) Fitrul Dwi Rustapa	7	0	0	0	7	0
2	DF	(Netherlands) Nick Kuipers	27+1	1	4	0	32	1
4	DF	(Indonesia) Putu Gede	13+1	0	0	0	14	0
5	DF	(Indonesia) Kakang Rudianto	10+3	0	0	0	13	0
6	MF	(Indonesia) Robi Darwis	2+5	0	0	0	7	0
7	MF	(Indonesia) Beckham Putra	17+11	1	0+3	1	31	2
8	MF	(Indonesia) Abdul Aziz	0+3	0	0	0	3	0
9	FW	(Indonesia) Ezra Walian	11+21	2	0+4	0	36	2
10	MF	(Spain) Tyronne del Pino	0+1	0	0	0	1	0
11	MF	(Indonesia) Dedi Kusnandar	22+4	0	4	0	30	0
12	DF	(Indonesia) Henhen Herdiana	12+1	0	4	0	17	0
13	MF	(Indonesia) Febri Hariyadi	7+3	1	4	1	14	2
14	GK	(Indonesia) Teja Paku Alam	17	0	0+1	0	18	0
15	MF	(Gabon) Lévy Madinda	13+2	1	0	0	15	1
16	DF	(Indonesia) Achmad Jufriyanto	1+1	0	0	0	2	0
18	MF	(Indonesia) Ferdiansyah Cecep	1+6	0	0+2	0	10	0
19	FW	(Brazil) David da Silva	29+1	26	4	4	34	30
21	FW	(Indonesia) Frets Butuan	7+7	3	0	0	14	3
22	DF	(Spain) Alberto Rodríguez	27+2	0	4	0	33	0
23	MF	(Indonesia) Marc Klok	28+3	4	2+1	1	34	5
27	DF	(Indonesia) Zalnando	2+2	0	0+1	0	5	0
29	GK	(Philippines) Kevin Ray Mendoza	10	0	4	0	14	0
32	DF	(Indonesia) Victor Igbonefo	7+7	0	0	0	14	0
53	MF	(Indonesia) Rachmat Irianto	17+8	1	2+2	0	29	1
56	DF	(Indonesia) Rezaldi Hehanussa	14+7	0	4	0	25	0
66	DF	(Philippines) Daisuke Sato	11+2	0	0	0	13	0
70	MF	(Indonesia) Arsan Makarin	0+13	0	0	0	13	0
71	MF	(Indonesia) Adzikry Fadlillah	1+2	0	0+1	0	4	0
77	FW	(Brazil) Ciro Alves	28+3	14	4	2	35	16
93	MF	(Italy) Stefano Beltrame	9+3	4	4	0	16	4
96	MF	(Indonesia) Ryan Kurnia	8+14	1	0+1	0	23	1
97	DF	(Indonesia) Edo Febriansah	16+13	1	0+3	1	32	2

Source: Competitions

=== Disciplinary record ===
No.	Pos.	Player	Liga 1						Total		
No.	Pos.	Player	Regular series			Championship series			Total		
No.	Pos.	Player	Yellow card	Second yellow card	Red card	Yellow card	Second yellow card	Red card	Yellow card	Second yellow card	Red card
1	GK	(Indonesia) Fitrul Dwi Rustapa	0	0	0	0	0	0	0	0	0
2	DF	(Netherlands) Nick Kuipers	9	0	1	0	0	0	9	0	1
4	DF	(Indonesia) Putu Gede	3	1	0	0	0	0	3	1	0
5	DF	(Indonesia) Kakang Rudianto	2	0	0	0	0	0	2	0	0
6	MF	(Indonesia) Robi Darwis	2	0	0	0	0	0	2	0	0
7	MF	(Indonesia) Beckham Putra	3	0	0	1	0	0	4	0	0
8	MF	(Indonesia) Abdul Aziz	0	0	0	0	0	0	0	0	0
9	FW	(Indonesia) Ezra Walian	4	0	0	0	0	0	4	0	0
10	MF	(Spain) Tyronne del Pino	0	0	0	0	0	0	0	0	0
11	MF	(Indonesia) Dedi Kusnandar	5	1	0	2	0	0	7	1	0
12	DF	(Indonesia) Henhen Herdiana	1	0	0	1	0	0	2	0	0
13	MF	(Indonesia) Febri Hariyadi	0	1	0	1	0	0	1	1	0
14	GK	(Indonesia) Teja Paku Alam	3	0	0	0	0	0	3	0	0
15	MF	(Gabon) Lévy Madinda	0	0	0	0	0	0	0	0	0
16	DF	(Indonesia) Achmad Jufriyanto	0	0	0	0	0	0	0	0	0
18	MF	(Indonesia) Ferdiansyah Cecep	1	0	0	0	0	0	1	0	0
19	FW	(Brazil) David da Silva	2	0	0	1	0	0	3	0	0
21	FW	(Indonesia) Frets Butuan	1	0	0	0	0	0	1	0	0
22	DF	(Spain) Alberto Rodríguez	7	0	0	0	0	0	7	0	0
23	MF	(Indonesia) Marc Klok	7	0	0	0	0	0	7	0	0
27	DF	(Indonesia) Zalnando	1	0	0	0	0	0	1	0	0
29	GK	(Philippines) Kevin Ray Mendoza	0	0	0	0	0	0	0	0	0
32	DF	(Indonesia) Victor Igbonefo	3	0	0	0	0	0	3	0	0
53	MF	(Indonesia) Rachmat Irianto	5	0	0	0	0	0	5	0	0
56	DF	(Indonesia) Rezaldi Hehanussa	4	0	0	2	0	0	6	0	0
66	DF	(Philippines) Daisuke Sato	4	0	0	0	0	0	4	0	0
70	MF	(Indonesia) Arsan Makarin	2	0	0	0	0	0	2	0	0
71	MF	(Indonesia) Adzikry Fadlillah	1	0	0	0	0	0	1	0	0
77	FW	(Brazil) Ciro Alves	1	0	0	0	0	0	1	0	0
93	MF	(Italy) Stefano Beltrame	0	0	0	1	0	0	1	0	0
96	MF	(Indonesia) Ryan Kurnia	2	0	0	0	0	0	2	0	0
97	DF	(Indonesia) Edo Febriansah	4	0	0	0	0	0	4	0	0

Source: Competitions
