= Rumakiek =

Rumakiek is a Papuan surname. Notable people with the surname include:

- David Rumakiek (born 1999), Indonesian professional footballer
- Ramai Rumakiek (born 2002), Indonesian professional footballer
