= Roni Sugeng =

Indonesian footballer

Personal information
- Full name: Roni Sugeng Ariyanto
- Date of birth: 18 April 1998 (age 28)
- Place of birth: Sragen, Indonesia
- Height: 1.70 m (5 ft 7 in)
- Position: Midfielder

Team information
- Current team: Persika Karanganyar

Youth career
- SSB IM Sragen
- PPLP Jateng
- 2015: Persis Solo
- 2016: PS TNI

Senior career*
Years	Team	Apps	(Gls)
2017–2024	Persikabo 1973	158	(6)
2024–2025	PSMS Medan	10	(0)
2025	Bekasi City	6	(0)
2026	Barito Putera	2	(0)
2026–	Persika Karanganyar	0	(0)
- * Club domestic league appearances and goals as of 23:11, 1 March 2026 (UTC)

Roni Sugeng Ariyanto (born 18 April 1998) is an Indonesian professional footballer who plays as a midfielder for Liga Nusantara club Persika Karanganyar.

== Club career ==
=== Persikabo 1973 / PS TNI ===
In 2017, Sugeng joined Liga 1 club PS TNI. He made his debut on 5 May 2017 in a match against Persiba Balikpapan. On 14 July 2017, Sugeng scored his first goal for PS TNI in the 74th minute against Sriwijaya at the Gelora Sriwijaya Stadium, Palembang.

== Career statistics ==
As of 1 March 2026

Club	Season	League		Cup		Continental		Other (Note: Appearances in Indonesia President's Cup)		Total	
Club	Season	Apps	Goals	Apps	Goals	Apps	Goals	Apps	Goals	Apps	Goals
TIRA-Persikabo	2017	22	1	0	0	–		3	0	25	1
TIRA-Persikabo	2018	24	0	0	0	–		1	0	25	0
TIRA-Persikabo	2019	27	0	0	0	–		0	0	27	0
TIRA-Persikabo	2020	2	0	0	0	–		0	0	2	0
TIRA-Persikabo	2021–22	23	1	0	0	–		3 (Note: Appearances in Menpora Cup)	0	26	1
TIRA-Persikabo	2022–23	29	0	0	0	–		3	0	32	0
TIRA-Persikabo	2023–24	31	4	0	0	–		0	0	31	4
PSMS Medan	2024–25	10	0	0	0	–		0	0	10	0
Bekasi City	2025–26	6	0	0	0	–		0	0	6	0
Barito Putera	2025–26	2	0	0	0	–		0	0	2	0
Career total		176	6	0	0	0	0	10	0	186	6

== Honours ==
=== Club ===
PS TNI U-21

- Indonesia Soccer Championship U-21: 2016
