= Mohammad Khanafi =

Indonesian footballer

Personal information
- Full name: Mohammad Khanafi
- Date of birth: 30 November 1997 (age 28)
- Place of birth: Kediri, Indonesia
- Height: 1.71 m (5 ft 7 in)
- Position: Forward

Team information
- Current team: Persik Kediri
- Number: 97

Youth career
- Persedikab Kediri

Senior career*
Years	Team	Apps	(Gls)
2017	Blitar United		
2018–2022	Persedikab Kediri	37	(16)
2023–	Persik Kediri	67	(14)
2026	→ Borneo Samarinda (loan)	4	(0)
- * Club domestic league appearances and goals as of 5 September 2026

Mohammad Khanafi (born 30 November 1997) is an Indonesian professional footballer who plays as a forward for Super League club Persik Kediri.

== Club career ==
=== Persedikab Kediri ===
He made 37 league appearances and scored 16 goals for Persedikab Kediri in the Liga 3 (Indonesia).

=== Persik Kediri ===
He was signed for Persik Kediri to play in Liga 1 in the 2022–23 season. Khanafi made his league debut on 4 February 2023 in a match against PSIS Semarang at the Brawijaya Stadium, Kediri. He scored his first league goal for the club on 23 February 2023, scored 2 goals in a 5–1 against RANS Nusantara.

== Honours ==
=== Club ===
Blitar United

- Liga 3 East Java: 2017

Persedikab Kediri

- Liga 3 East Java runner-up: 2021
