= Bhudiar Riza =

Indonesian footballer

Personal information
- Full name: Bhudiar Muhammad Riza
- Date of birth: 23 May 1995 (age 31)
- Place of birth: Wonogiri, Indonesia
- Height: 1.77 m (5 ft 10 in)
- Position: Full-back

Youth career
- 2016: Persinga Ngawi

Senior career*
| Years | Team | Apps | (Gls) |
| 2017–2019 | Kalteng Putra | 55 | (0) |
| 2020 | Persijap Jepara | 1 | (0) |
| 2021–2023 | Dewa United | 26 | (0) |
| 2023–2024 | PSIM Yogyakarta | 14 | (0) |
| 2024–2025 | PSKC Cimahi | 20 | (0) |
| 2025–2026 | PSMS Medan | 19 | (0) |
- * Club domestic league appearances and goals as of 2 May 2026

Bhudiar Muhammad Riza (born 23 May 1995) is an Indonesian professional footballer who plays as a full-back.

== Club career ==
=== Persijap Jepara ===
Riza signed with Persijap Jepara to play in the Indonesian Liga 2 for the 2020 season. This season was suspended on 27 March 2020 due to the COVID-19 pandemic. The season was abandoned and was declared void on 20 January 2021.

=== Dewa United ===
In 2021, Riza signed a contract with Indonesian Liga 2 club Dewa United. He made his league debut on 28 September against RANS Cilegon at the Gelora Bung Karno Madya Stadium, Jakarta.

== Career statistics ==
=== Club ===
As of 2 May 2026

| Club | Season | League | | | Cup | | Continental | | Other | | Total | |
| Club | Season | Division | Apps | Goals | Apps | Goals | Apps | Goals | Apps | Goals | Apps | Goals |
|---|---|---|---|---|---|---|---|---|---|---|---|---|
| Kalteng Putra | 2017 | Liga 2 | 16 | 0 | 0 | 0 | – | | 0 | 0 | 16 | 0 |
| Kalteng Putra | 2018 | Liga 2 | 29 | 0 | 0 | 0 | – | | 0 | 0 | 29 | 0 |
| Kalteng Putra | 2019 | Liga 1 | 10 | 0 | 0 | 0 | – | | 1 (Note: Appearances in Indonesia President's Cup) | 0 | 11 | 0 |
| Kalteng Putra | total | | 55 | 0 | 0 | 0 | – | | 1 | 0 | 56 | 0 |
| Persijap Jepara | 2020 | Liga 2 | 1 | 0 | 0 | 0 | – | | 0 | 0 | 1 | 0 |
| Dewa United | 2021 | Liga 2 | 13 | 0 | 0 | 0 | – | | 0 | 0 | 13 | 0 |
| Dewa United | 2022–23 | Liga 1 | 13 | 0 | 0 | 0 | – | | 1 | 0 | 14 | 0 |
| Dewa United | total | | 26 | 0 | 0 | 0 | – | | 1 | 0 | 27 | 0 |
| PSIM Yogyakarta | 2023–24 | Liga 2 | 14 | 0 | 0 | 0 | – | | 0 | 0 | 14 | 0 |
| PSKC Cimahi | 2024–25 | Liga 2 | 20 | 0 | 0 | 0 | – | | 0 | 0 | 20 | 0 |
| PSMS Medan | 2025–26 | Championship | 19 | 0 | 0 | 0 | – | | 0 | 0 | 19 | 0 |
| Career total | | | 135 | 0 | 0 | 0 | 0 | 0 | 2 | 0 | 137 | 0 |

== Honours ==
=== Club ===
Kalteng Putra

- Liga 2 third place (play-offs): 2018
