= Zalnando =

Indonesian footballer (born 1996)

Personal information
- Full name: Zalnando
- Date of birth: 25 December 1996 (age 29)
- Place of birth: Cimahi, Indonesia
- Height: 1.76 m (5 ft 9 in)
- Position: Left-back

Team information
- Current team: Persita Tangerang
- Number: 27

Youth career
- 2012–2013: Deportivo Indonesia
- 2013–2016: Sriwijaya

Senior career*
| Years | Team | Apps | (Gls) |
| 2016–2018 | Sriwijaya | 50 | (0) |
| 2019–2026 | Persib Bandung | 54 | (2) |
| 2024 | → PSIS Semarang (loan) | 13 | (0) |
| 2025–2026 | → Persita Tangerang (loan) | 20 | (0) |
| 2026– | Persita Tangerang | 1 | (0) |

International career
| 2011 | Indonesia U16 | 4 | (1) |
| 2014 | Indonesia U21 | 2 | (0) |
| 2015–2017 | Indonesia U23 | 2 | (0) |
| 2017 | Indonesia | 1 | (0) |
- * Club domestic league appearances and goals as of 5 September 2026

Zalnando (born 25 December 1996) is an Indonesian professional footballer who plays as a left-back for Super League club Persita Tangerang

== Club career ==
=== Sriwijaya ===
Zalnando was born in Cimahi. He was included in the squad of Sriwijaya for 2016 Indonesia Soccer Championship A. Zalnando make his debut against Persiba Balikpapan in the second week ISC A.

=== Persib Bandung ===
In 2019, Zalnando signed a contract with Indonesian Liga 1 club Persib Bandung. He made his league debut on 28 October 2019 in a match against Persija Jakarta at the Kapten I Wayan Dipta Stadium, Gianyar. He finished the season with 7 appearances.

On 26 February 2021, Zalnando extended his contract for another two years with Persib. He played the full 90 minutes in the won to PSS Sleman on 22 October 2021, where he registered one assist. Eight days later, Zalnando give another assists a goal by Wander Luiz in Persib's 3–0 win over Persipura Jayapura.

On 22 February 2022, Zalnando scored his first league goal for the club in a 0–2 win against PSM Makassar and scored second league goal in a 3–2 win against Madura United on 13 March 2022. Zalnando had his best performance in the 2021–22 season where he scored 2 goals and 21 league appearances.

Zalnando started the new 2022–23 season with Persib in a 2–2 draw over Bhayangkara on 24 July 2022, and give one assists a goal by Rachmat Irianto in 42nd minute.

On 14 December 2022, Zalnando suffered a serious injury while competing against Dewa United in the continued match of Liga 1. He broke his ankle due to the wrong footing during a tackle on Dewa United's player, Karim Rossi when the match entered the 80th minute, he had to undergo intensive and also be absent for the next few matches.

==== Loan to PSIS Semarang ====
On 4 August 2024, Zalnando was loaned to PSIS Semarang for a duration of 6 months. Zalnando made his debut on 17 August 2024 in a match against Persis Solo at the Manahan Stadium, Surakarta.

== International career ==
Zalnando made his first appearance in the national team while playing for Indonesia U-16 in 2011 AFF U-16 Youth Championship. He took part in the U23 national team selection for the 2015 SEA Games and was selected to the final squad.

He made his international debut for Indonesia senior team on 21 March 2017, against Myanmar, where he coming as a substitute.

== Career statistics ==
=== Club ===
As of 5 September 2026

| Club | Season | League | | | Cup (Note: Includes Piala Indonesia) | | Continental | | Other (Note: Appearances in Indonesia President's Cup) | | Total | |
| Club | Season | Division | Apps | Goals | Apps | Goals | Apps | Goals | Apps | Goals | Apps | Goals |
|---|---|---|---|---|---|---|---|---|---|---|---|---|
| Sriwijaya | 2016 | ISC A | 21 | 0 | 0 | 0 | – | | 0 | 0 | 21 | 0 |
| Sriwijaya | 2017 | Liga 1 | 11 | 0 | 0 | 0 | – | | 4 | 0 | 15 | 0 |
| Sriwijaya | 2018 | Liga 1 | 18 | 0 | 0 | 0 | – | | 4 | 0 | 22 | 0 |
| Sriwijaya | Total | | 50 | 0 | 0 | 0 | – | | 8 | 0 | 58 | 0 |
| Persib Bandung | 2019 | Liga 1 | 7 | 0 | 1 | 0 | – | | 1 | 0 | 9 | 0 |
| Persib Bandung | 2020 | Liga 1 | 0 | 0 | 0 | 0 | – | | 0 | 0 | 0 | 0 |
| Persib Bandung | 2021–22 | Liga 1 | 21 | 2 | 0 | 0 | – | | 2 (Note: Appearances in Menpora Cup) | 0 | 23 | 2 |
| Persib Bandung | 2022–23 | Liga 1 | 9 | 0 | 0 | 0 | – | | 4 | 0 | 13 | 0 |
| Persib Bandung | 2023–24 | Liga 1 | 4 | 0 | 0 | 0 | – | | 0 | 0 | 4 | 0 |
| Persib Bandung | 2024–25 | Liga 1 | 13 | 0 | 0 | 0 | – | | 0 | 0 | 13 | 0 |
| Persib Bandung | 2025–26 | Super League | 0 | 0 | 0 | 0 | 0 | 0 | 0 | 0 | 0 | 0 |
| Persib Bandung | Total | | 54 | 2 | 1 | 0 | – | | 7 | 0 | 62 | 2 |
| PSIS Semarang (loan) | 2024–25 | Liga 1 | 13 | 0 | 0 | 0 | – | | 0 | 0 | 13 | 0 |
| Persita Tangerang (loan) | 2025–26 | Super League | 20 | 0 | 0 | 0 | – | | 0 | 0 | 20 | 0 |
| Persita Tangerang | 2026–27 | Super League | 1 | 0 | 0 | 0 | – | | 0 | 0 | 1 | 0 |
| Career total | | | 138 | 2 | 1 | 0 | 0 | 0 | 15 | 0 | 154 | 2 |

=== International ===
As of match played 21 March 2017

Appearances and goals by national team and year
| National team | Year | Apps | Goals |
|---|---|---|---|
| Indonesia | 2017 | 1 | 0 |
| Total | | 1 | 0 |

== Honours ==
=== Club ===
Sriwijaya U-21

- Indonesia Super League U-21: 2012–13

Sriwijaya

- East Kalimantan Governor Cup: 2018

Persib Bandung

- Liga 1: 2023–24, 2024–25
