= Daffa Salman =

Indonesian footballer

Personal information
- Full name: Muhammad Daffa Salman Zahran Sidik
- Date of birth: 30 April 2002 (age 24)
- Place of birth: Tasikmalaya, Indonesia
- Height: 1.80 m (5 ft 11 in)
- Position: Centre-back

Team information
- Current team: Persik Kediri
- Number: 68

Youth career
- 2017: Askot Cimahi
- 2020: Porprov Tasikmalaya
- 2021: Persikotas Tasikmalaya

Senior career*
Years	Team	Apps	(Gls)
2022	R2B Legend	3	(0)
2022–2023	Persela Lamongan	6	(0)
2023–2026	PSM Makassar	42	(0)
2026–	Persik Kediri	6	(0)
- * Club domestic league appearances and goals as of 31 October 2026 (UTC)

Muhammad Daffa Salman Zahran Sidik (born 30 April 2002) commonly known as Daffa Salman, is an Indonesian professional footballer who plays as a centre-back for Super League club Persik Kediri.

== Club career ==
Daffa started his career by joining Liga 3 club Persikotas Tasikmalaya in 2021 season and joined R2B Legend in 2022 season.

=== Persela Lamongan ===
On 10 June 2022, Daffa signed a contract with Liga 2 club Persela Lamongan to play in 2022–23 season. On 4 September 2022, Daffa made his debut for the club in a 2–3 lose over Persikab Bandung. On 22 September 2022, He marked his first win with Persela in a 2–1 home win over Persipa Pati. In his first season at Persela Lamongan, he only went on to make 6 appearances, because Liga 2 was suspended due to a tragedy.

=== PSM Makassar ===
On 20 July 2023, Daffa signed one-year contract with Liga 1 club PSM Makassar with option to extend. He made his league debut on 16 September 2023 as a substituted in a 2–0 home win Barito Putera at Gelora B.J. Habibie Stadium. He received an individual award as the best young player in week 16 of 2023–24 Liga 1 after impressing in a 3–0 win against Arema.

== Career statistics ==
=== Club ===
As of 31 October 2026

Club	Season	League			Cup		Continental		Other		Total	
Club	Season	Division	Apps	Goals	Apps	Goals	Apps	Goals	Apps	Goals	Apps	Goals
R2B Legend	2022–23	Liga 3	3	0	0	0	–		0	0	3	0
Persela Lamongan	2022–23	Liga 2	6	0	0	0	–		0	0	6	0
PSM Makassar	2023–24	Liga 1	20	0	0	0	4 (Note: Appearances in AFC Cup)	0	0	0	24	0
PSM Makassar	2024–25	Liga 1	16	0	0	0	–		5 (Note: Appearances in ASEAN Club Championship)	0	21	0
PSM Makassar	2025–26	Super League	6	0	0	0	–		0	0	6	0
Persik Kediri	2026–27	Super League	6	0	0	0	–		0	0	6	0
Career total			57	0	0	0	4	0	5	0	66	0

== Honours ==
Individual

- Liga 1 Young Player of the Month: November 2023
