= Mario Londok =

Indonesian footballer

Personal information
- Full name: Mario Fabio Londok
- Date of birth: 14 November 1997 (age 28)
- Place of birth: Kotamobagu, Indonesia
- Height: 1.80 m (5 ft 11 in)
- Position: Goalkeeper

Senior career*
Years	Team	Apps	(Gls)
2016	Celebest	2	(0)
2017	Martapura	2	(0)
2018	Persidago Gorontalo	6	(0)
2019–2022	Persipura Jayapura	7	(0)
2023	Persib Bandung	0	(0)
2023–2024	Barito Putera	0	(0)
2023–2024	→ PSBS Biak (loan)	12	(0)
2024	PSBS Biak	2	(0)
2025	Persiraja Banda Aceh	3	(0)
2025	Persela Lamongan	11	(0)
2026	PSIS Semarang	8	(0)
2026	Persis Solo	0	(0)
- * Club domestic league appearances and goals as of 11 April 2026

Mario Fabio Londok (born 14 November 1997) is an Indonesian professional footballer who plays as a goalkeeper.

== Club career ==
=== Persipura Jayapura ===
He was signed for Persipura Jayapura to play in Liga 1 in the 2019 season. Mario made his league debut on 22 May 2019 in a match against Persela Lamongan at the Surajaya Stadium, Lamongan.

== Career statistics ==
=== Club ===
As of match played 11 April 2026

Club	Season	League			Cup (Note: Includes Piala Indonesia.)		Other		Total	
Club	Season	Division	Apps	Goals	Apps	Goals	Apps	Goals	Apps	Goals
Celebest	2016	ISC B	2	0	0	0	0	0	2	0
Martapura	2017	Liga 2	2	0	0	0	0	0	2	0
Persidago Gorontalo	2018	Liga 3	6	0	2	0	0	0	8	0
Persipura Jayapura	2019	Liga 1	4	0	0	0	0	0	4	0
Persipura Jayapura	2020–21	Liga 1	0	0	0	0	0	0	0	0
Persipura Jayapura	2021	Liga 1	0	0	0	0	0	0	0	0
Persipura Jayapura	2022–23	Liga 2	3	0	0	0	0	0	3	0
Persipura Jayapura	Total		7	0	0	0	0	0	7	0
Persib Bandung	2022–23	Liga 1	0	0	0	0	0	0	0	0
Barito Putera	2023–24	Liga 1	0	0	0	0	0	0	0	0
PSBS Biak (loan)	2023–24	Liga 2	12	0	0	0	0	0	12	0
PSBS Biak	2024–25	Liga 1	2	0	0	0	0	0	2	0
Persiraja Banda Aceh	2024–25	Liga 2	3	0	0	0	0	0	3	0
Persela Lamongan	2025–26	Championship	11	0	0	0	0	0	11	0
PSIS Semarang	2025–26	Championship	8	0	0	0	0	0	8	0
Career total			53	0	2	0	0	0	55	0

== Honours ==
PSBS Biak

- Liga 2: 2023–24

Individual

- Liga 2 Team of the Season: 2023–24
