= Reky Rahayu =

Indonesian footballer (born 1993)

Personal information
- Full name: Reky Rahayu
- Date of birth: 8 May 1993 (age 33)
- Place of birth: Tangerang, Indonesia
- Height: 1.76 m (5 ft 9 in)
- Position: Goalkeeper

Team information
- Current team: PSIS Semarang
- Number: 1

Youth career
- 2011–2013: Persita Tangerang

Senior career*
| Years | Team | Apps | (Gls) |
| 2012–2014 | Persita Tangerang | 11 | (0) |
| 2015–2016 | Persija Jakarta | 4 | (0) |
| 2017 | Persita Tangerang | 5 | (0) |
| 2018 | Persika Karawang | 7 | (0) |
| 2019 | Bandung United | 12 | (0) |
| 2019 | Kalteng Putra | 17 | (0) |
| 2020–2021 | Persela Lamongan | 2 | (0) |
| 2021 | PSG Pati | 0 | (0) |
| 2022 | Kalteng Putra | 1 | (0) |
| 2022–2024 | Persib Bandung | 9 | (0) |
| 2025–2026 | PSMS Medan | 24 | (0) |
| 2026– | PSIS Semarang | 3 | (0) |
- * Club domestic league appearances and goals as of 21 November 2026

Reky Rahayu (born 8 May 1993) is an Indonesian professional footballer who plays as a goalkeeper for Championship club PSIS Semarang.

== Club career ==
=== Persita Tangerang ===
In 2013, Reky signed a contract with Persita Tangerang. Reky made his debut after he promotion to senior team of Persita Tangerang against Persib Bandung in 2013 Indonesia Super League. and in 2017 season, he returned to joined Persita Tangerang.

=== Persija Jakarta ===
In February 2016, Reky signed one-year contract with Persija Jakarta for plays in the 2016 Indonesia Soccer Championship A.

== Honours ==
Persib Bandung

- Liga 1: 2023–24
