= Fitrul Dwi Rustapa =

Indonesian association footballer

Personal information
- Full name: Fitrul Dwi Rustapa
- Date of birth: 5 June 1995 (age 31)
- Place of birth: Garut, Indonesia
- Height: 1.77 m (5 ft 10 in)
- Position: Goalkeeper

Team information
- Current team: Bali United
- Number: 56

Senior career*
Years	Team	Apps	(Gls)
2016–2017	Persegres Gresik	15	(0)
2018–2022	Persipura Jayapura	26	(0)
2022–2024	Persib Bandung	9	(0)
2024–	Bali United	5	(0)
- * Club domestic league appearances and goals as of 18 April 2025

Fitrul Dwi Rustapa (born 5 June 1995) is an Indonesian professional footballer who plays as a goalkeeper for Super League club Bali United.

== Club career ==
=== Persegres Gresik United ===
In 2016, Fitrul signed a year contract with Persegres Gresik United. He made his league debut on 29 April 2017 in a match against Borneo at the Segiri Stadium, Samarinda.

=== Persipura Jayapura ===
He was signed for Persipura Jayapura to play in Liga 1 in the 2018 season. Fitrul made his debut on 10 September 2021 in a match against Persela Lamongan at the Wibawa Mukti Stadium, Cikarang.

=== Persib Bandung ===
Fitrul was signed for Persib Bandung to play in Liga 1 in the 2022–23 season. He made his league debut on 24 July 2022 in a match against Bhayangkara at the Wibawa Mukti Stadium, Cikarang.

== Career statistics ==
=== Club ===
As of match played 18 April 2025

Club	Season	League			Cup		Continental		Other		Total	
Club	Season	Division	Apps	Goals	Apps	Goals	Apps	Goals	Apps	Goals	Apps	Goals
Persegres Gresik	2016	ISC A	0	0	0	0	0	0	0	0	0	0
Persegres Gresik	2017	Liga 1	15	0	0	0	0	0	0	0	15	0
Persegres Gresik	Total		15	0	0	0	0	0	0	0	15	0
Persipura Jayapura	2018	Liga 1	0	0	0	0	0	0	0	0	0	0
Persipura Jayapura	2019	Liga 1	0	0	0	0	0	0	0	0	0	0
Persipura Jayapura	2020	Liga 1	0	0	0	0	0	0	0	0	0	0
Persipura Jayapura	2021–22	Liga 1	26	0	0	0	0	0	0	0	26	0
Persipura Jayapura	Total		26	0	0	0	0	0	0	0	26	0
Persib Bandung	2022–23	Liga 1	2	0	0	0	0	0	3 (Note: Appearances in Indonesia President's Cup)	0	5	0
Persib Bandung	2023–24	Liga 1	7	0	0	0	–		0	0	7	0
Persib Bandung	Total		9	0	0	0	–		0	0	9	0
Bali United	2024–25	Liga 1	5	0	0	0	—		0	0	5	0
Career total			55	0	0	0	0	0	3	0	58	0

== Honours ==
Persib Bandung

- Liga 1: 2023–24
