= Ciro Alves =

Brazilian-born Indonesian professional footballer (born 1989)

Ciro
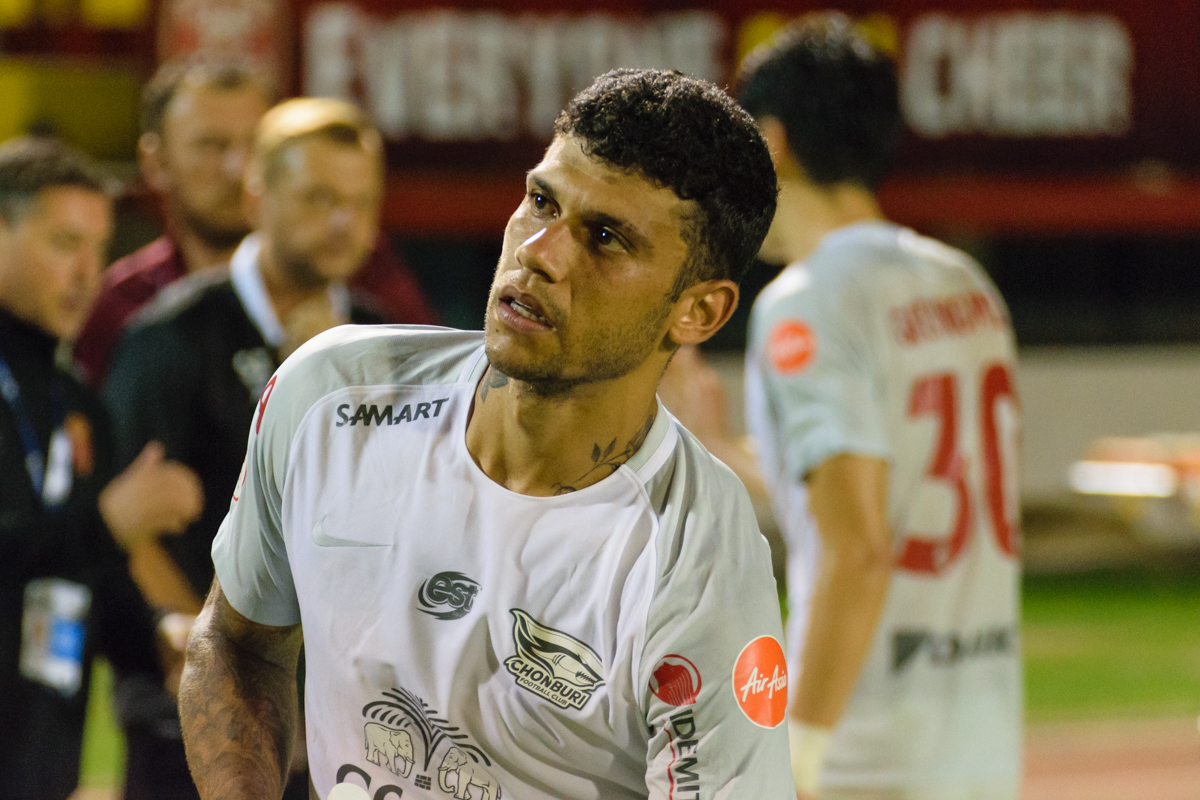
- Ciro playing for Chonburi in 2018

Personal information
- Full name: Ciro Henrique Alves Ferreira e Silva
- Date of birth: 18 April 1989 (age 37)
- Place of birth: Salgueiro, Brazil
- Height: 1.75 m (5 ft 9 in)
- Position: Winger

Team information
- Current team: Java United
- Number: 7

Youth career
- 2004–2005: Salgueiro
- 2006–2008: Sport Recife

Senior career*
Years	Team	Apps	(Gls)
2008–2011	Sport Recife	70	(23)
2011	Fluminense	14	(2)
2012	Bahia	14	(0)
2013	Atlético Paranaense	9	(0)
2014	Figueirense	1	(0)
2015	Luverdense	13	(3)
2015	Jeju United	7	(0)
2016	Remo	12	(0)
2017	Joinville	9	(0)
2018	Chonburi	36	(7)
2019–2022	Persikabo 1973	74	(37)
2022–2025	Persib Bandung	96	(32)
2025–	Java United	35	(12)

International career
2009	Brazil U20	7	(5)
Medal record
Men's football
Representing Brazil
FIFA U-20 World Cup
Runner-up	2009 Egypt	Team
- * Club domestic league appearances and goals as of 30 October 2026

Ciro Henrique Alves Ferreira e Silva (born 18 April 1989), commonly known as Ciro Alves or simply Ciro, is a Brazilian professional footballer who plays as a winger for Super League club Java United.

== Club career ==
=== Sport Recife ===
Ciro started his career in Sport Recife with a lot of promise. In 2008, Ciro played a few matches for the main team, scoring four goals (one against Ipatinga, one against Vasco and two against Atlético Mineiro) in eight games, three as a starter. In 2009, he started the year as a starter, scoring seven goals in ten matches in the Campeonato Pernambucano. He also played in the 2009 Copa Libertadores, the most prestigious club tournament in South America, in which he a goal and an assist in a match against Colo-Colo at the latter's base in Santiago, Chile. Legendary Pelé, commented after seeing the young Brazilian play, stating that Ciro would be one of the best players in the world within the next five years.

=== Difficult years ===
Pelé's prophecy did not come true. On 20 May 2011, Ciro left Recife and signed a two-year loan deal with Brazilian Série A side Fluminense in an attempt to pursue national recognition in Brazil. After playing more than a dozen games, he could not secure a solid spot on the roster in the famed club. He faced the same fate in the subsequent Brazilian clubs that he joined, leading to a decision to find opportunities in Asia. On 22 July 2015, he joined Korean club Jeju United but the experiment also failed after a few months. Afterward, he went through several Brazilian teams without making a lasting mark.

=== Chonburi F.C. ===
At the age of 28 in 2018, when his promising talent was unfulfilled, Ciro gave Asia a second try with a move to top-flight Thailand club Chonburi, which resurrected his career. He played in 31 matches, a lot more playing time than in any other of his post-Recife clubs, and scored five goals.

=== Indonesia ===
His success in Thailand attracted offers from Indonesia, including the army-owned Persikabo 1973 where he played for three years - the longest spell after his promising start with Recife. He scored 35 goals in 67 matches for Persikabo, proving that he was a prolific striker who can carry his team. His performance led Persib Bandung, the club with the largest fanbase in Liga 1, to secure his service for the 2022–23 season of Liga 1 and the club's participation in the 2023 AFC Cup.

Ciro scored one goal in the 2024 Liga 1 (Indonesia) finals as Persib Bandung won the first leg 3-0. He provided two assist in the second leg as Persib won 3-1 in the second leg and 6-1 in aggregate to win the 2024 Liga 1.

== International career ==
Ciro was a member of the Brazil national under-20 football team in 2009 when he played in the 2009 FIFA U-20 World Cup, in which Brazil came second. He scored a goal against Australia in the tournament.

== Honours ==
Sport Recife

- Campeonato Pernambucano: 2009, 2010

Bahia

- Campeonato Baiano: 2012

Persib Bandung

- Liga 1: 2023–24, 2024–25

Brazil U20

- FIFA U-20 World Cup runner-up: 2009

Individual

- Campeonato Pernambucano top scorer: 2010
- Liga 1 Goal of the Month: January 2022, August 2023, December 2024
- Liga 1 Team of the Season: 2021–22, 2023–24
- APPI Indonesian Football Award Best Midfielder: 2021–22
- APPI Indonesian Football Award Best 11: 2021–22, 2023–2024, 2024–25
