= Lucky Oktavianto =

Indonesian association footballer

Personal information
- Full name: Lucky Oktavianto
- Date of birth: 5 October 1993 (age 33)
- Place of birth: Jepara, Indonesia
- Height: 1.65 m (5 ft 5 in)
- Position: Right-back

Team information
- Current team: Persiku Kudus
- Number: 93

Senior career*
Years	Team	Apps	(Gls)
2017–2018	Cilegon United	19	(2)
2018–2019	Persijap Jepara	21	(1)
2019–2020	Persibat Batang	22	(0)
2020–2021	Mitra Kukar	10	(1)
2022–2024	Persikabo 1973	62	(2)
2024–2025	PSIM Yogyakarta	16	(0)
2025–2026	PSBS Biak	9	(0)
2026–	Persiku Kudus	0	(0)
- * Club domestic league appearances and goals as of 2 May 2026

Lucky Oktavianto (born 5 October 1993) is an Indonesian professional footballer who plays as a right-back for Championship club Persiku Kudus.

== Club career ==
=== Mitra Kukar ===
In 2020, Lucky signed one-year contract with Mitra Kukar. This season was suspended on 27 March 2020 due to the COVID-19 pandemic. The season was abandoned and was declared void on 20 January 2021.

He made his league debut in the new season on 7 October 2021 in a 1–1 draw against PSBS Biak. On 19 October 2021, He marked his first win with Mitra Kukar in 2021–22 Liga 2 in a 2–0 win over Kalteng Putra. On 10 November 2021, Lucky scored his first goal for the club, opening the scoring in a 2–2 draw against Sulut United. He made 10 league appearances for Mitra Kukar during the 2021–22 season, scoring one goal.

=== Persikabo 1973 ===
Ahead of the second round of 2021–22 season, Lucky signed a contract with Liga 1 club Persikabo 1973. He made his Liga 1 debut on 3 February 2022, coming on as a starter in a 0–3 lost against Bali United. By the end of the second round of 2021–22 season, he was a starter in 7 appearances and 3 from substituted of the club's Liga 1 fixtures, as Persikabo 1973 finished in tenth place on the Liga 1 table.

On 25 July 2022, he started his match in the 2022–23 Liga 1 season for Persikabo 1973, playing as a starter in a 1–0 win over Persebaya Surabaya. Lucky scored his first goal on 15 April 2023, in an 1–4 away win against Persib Bandung.

== Honours ==
PSIM Yogyakarta

- Liga 2: 2024–25

Individual

- Liga 1 Goal of the Month: February 2024
