= Ramiro Fergonzi =

Argentine footballer

Personal information
- Full name: Ramiro Ezequiel Fergonzi
- Date of birth: 14 May 1989 (age 37)
- Place of birth: Buenos Aires, Argentina
- Height: 1.78 m (5 ft 10 in)
- Position: Forward

Youth career
- Colegiales

Senior career*
Years	Team	Apps	(Gls)
2008–2011	Colegiales	69	(14)
2011	→ Unión San Felipe (loan)	6	(0)
2014–2015	Deportivo Español	52	(5)
2016	Almirante Brown	18	(4)
2016–2017	Flandria	44	(6)
2017–2018	Atlético Mitre	22	(4)
2018	Patriotas Boyacá	17	(2)
2018–2019	Atlético Zacatepec	10	(1)
2019	Bhayangkara	15	(4)
2020–2021	Chacarita Juniors	22	(4)
2021	Alianza Atlético	14	(2)
2022	Persipura Jayapura	14	(3)
2022–2024	Persita Tangerang	64	(21)
2024–2025	Persik Kediri	29	(9)
2025	Deportivo Morón	16	(0)
2026	Adhyaksa Banten	11	(7)
- * Club domestic league appearances and goals as of 8 May 2026

Ramiro Ezequiel Fergonzi (born 14 May 1989) is an Argentine professional footballer who plays as a forward.

== Club career ==
He made his professional debut with Colegiales in 2008, he was then loaned to Unión San Felipe for one season in 2011, where he played alongside his compatriot, Omar Merlo. Despite having a contract with Colegiales, he decided to terminate it.

In 2014, he moved to Deportivo Español and two years later he played for Almirante Brown and Flandria.

In August 2017, Atlético Mitre announced the signing of Fergonzi. In mid-2018, he joined Patriotas Boyacá, becoming one of the regular players and putting in impressive performances.

In December 2018, he moved to Mexican club Zacatepec. Fergonzi finished the season with only one goal in 10 games with Zacatepec.

In May 2019, he move to Indonesia and signed with Bhayangkara.
