= Kakang Rudianto =

Indonesian footballer

Personal information
- Full name: Kakang Rudianto
- Date of birth: 2 February 2003 (age 23)
- Place of birth: Cianjur, Indonesia
- Height: 1.85 m (6 ft 1 in)
- Positions: Centre-back; right-back

Team information
- Current team: Persib Bandung
- Number: 5

Youth career
- SSB Atep Sevent
- 2018–2021: Persib Bandung
- 2019–2020: Garuda Select

Senior career*
Years	Team	Apps	(Gls)
2020–	Persib Bandung	84	(1)
2021	→ Bandung United (loan)	0	(0)

International career^{‡}
2022–2023	Indonesia U20	18	(1)
2025	Indonesia U23	11	(0)
2024–	Indonesia	1	(0)
Medal record
Men's football
Representing Indonesia
ASEAN U-23 Championship
Runner-up	2025 Indonesia	Team
- * Club domestic league appearances and goals as of 1 November 2026 ‡ National team caps and goals as of 12 December 2025

Kakang Rudianto (born 2 February 2003) is an Indonesian professional footballer who plays as a defender for Super League club Persib Bandung and the Indonesia national team.

== Club career ==
=== Persib Bandung ===
He was signed for Persib Bandung to play in Liga 1 in the 2021 season. Kakang made his first-team debut on 29 January 2022 in a match against Persikabo 1973 at the Ngurah Rai Stadium, Denpasar. He also scored his first goal for the team in 22nd minute.

== International career ==
On 30 May 2022, Kakang made his debut for an Indonesian youth team against a Venezuela U-20 squad in the 2022 Maurice Revello Tournament in France. In October 2022, it was reported that Kakang received a call-up from the Indonesia U-20 for a training camp, in Turkey and Spain.

On 25 November 2024, Kakang received a called up to the preliminary squad to the Indonesia national team for the 2024 ASEAN Championship.

== Career statistics ==
=== Club ===
As of 1 November 2026

Appearances and goals by club, season and competition
Club	Season	League			Cup		Continental		Other		Total	
Club	Season	Division	Apps	Goals	Apps	Goals	Apps	Goals	Apps	Goals	Apps	Goals
Persib Bandung	2020	Liga 1	0	0	0	0	0	0	0	0	0	0
Persib Bandung	2021–22	Liga 1	3	1	0	0	0	0	0	0	3	1
Persib Bandung	2022–23	Liga 1	11	0	0	0	0	0	0	0	11	0
Persib Bandung	2023–24	Liga 1	13	0	0	0	0	0	0	0	13	0
Persib Bandung	2024–25	Liga 1	25	0	0	0	3 (Note: Appearances in AFC Champions League Two)	0	3 (Note: Appearances in Piala Presiden)	0	31	0
Persib Bandung	2025–26	Super League	28	0	0	0	3	0	0	0	31	0
Persib Bandung	2026–27	Super League	4	0	0	0	3	0	1 (Note: Appearances in ASEAN Club Championship)	0	8	0
Bandung United (loan)	2021	Liga 3	0	0	0	0	0	0	0	0	0	0
Career total			84	1	0	0	9	0	4	0	97	1

=== International ===
As of match played 12 December 2024

Appearances and goals by national team and year
National team	Year	Apps	Goals
Indonesia	2024	1	0
Total		1	0

== Honours ==
Persib Bandung

- Liga 1/Super League: 2023–24, 2024–25, 2025–26
- Piala Presiden runner-up: 2026

ASEAN All-Stars

- Maybank Challenge Cup: 2025

Indonesia U-23

- ASEAN U-23 Championship runner-up: 2025

Individual

- Persib Bandung Breakthrough Player of the Year 2021–22
