= Eriyanto =

Indonesian professional footballer

Personal information
- Date of birth: 12 March 1996 (age 30)
- Place of birth: Sukabumi, Indonesia
- Height: 1.68 m (5 ft 6 in)
- Position: Full-back

Youth career
- 2014–2015: Persib Bandung

Senior career*
Years	Team	Apps	(Gls)
2016	PSIR Rembang	3	(0)
2016	Persibangga Purbalingga	6	(0)
2017	Madura United	8	(0)
2018–2019	PSPS Riau	29	(0)
2019–2021	Persiraja Banda Aceh	15	(1)
2021–2022	Persis Solo	5	(0)
2022	→ Persiraja Banda Aceh (loan)	10	(0)
2022–2024	Persib Bandung	0	(0)
2023	→ PSPS Riau (loan)	7	(0)
2024	Persiraja Banda Aceh	0	(0)

International career^{‡}
2013–2014	Indonesia U19	5	(0)
2014	Indonesia U21	2	(0)
- * Club domestic league appearances and goals as of 6 February 2024 ‡ National team caps and goals as of 7 February 2014

Eriyanto (born 12 March 1996) is an Indonesian professional footballer who plays as a full-back.

== Club career ==
=== Early career ===
He is a young Indonesian footballer who joined in The All Star Team Milan Junior Camp who coached by Yeyen Tumena. They made history by winning the Milan Junior Camp Day Tournament, in San Siro, Milan, Italy. On October 17, 2010. Eriyanto was selected as the best captain.

=== PSIR Rembang ===
PSIR Rembang is his first professional club, where he played as a right back.

=== Madura United ===
In January 2017, Eriyanto signed a contract with Madura United to commence ahead of the 2017 Liga 1. He made his league debut on 16 April 2017 in a match against Bali United at the Gelora Ratu Pamelingan Stadium, Pamekasan.

=== PSPS Riau ===
In 2018 Eriyanto signed with PSPS Riau for the 2018 Liga 2. He made 29 league appearances for PSPS, before being released on a free transfer during the mid-season transfer window.

=== Persiraja Banda Aceh ===
After being released by PSPS, Persiraja Banda Aceh immediately signed Eriyanto on a free transfer during the mid-season transfer window. He made his league debut on 29 February 2020 by starting in a 0–0 draw against Bhayangkara.

=== Persis Solo ===
On 1 May 2021, Eriyanto officially joined Persis Solo from Persiraja Banda Aceh. Eriyanto made his first 2021–22 Liga 2 debut on 26 September 2021, coming on as a substitute in a 2–0 win against PSG Pati at the Manahan Stadium, Surakarta.

==== Persiraja Banda Aceh (loan) ====
He was signed for Persiraja Banda Aceh to play in Liga 1 in the 2021 season, on loan from Persis Solo. Eriyanto made his league debut on 30 January 2022 in a match against Persija Jakarta at the Ngurah Rai Stadium, Denpasar.

== Honours ==
=== Club ===
Persiraja Banda Aceh

- Liga 2 third place (play-offs): 2019

Persis Solo

- Liga 2: 2021
