= Ferdiansyah Cecep =

Indonesian footballer

Personal information
- Full name: Ferdiansyah Cecep Surya
- Date of birth: 15 July 2003 (age 23)
- Place of birth: Bandung, Indonesia
- Height: 1.72 m (5 ft 8 in)
- Positions: Winger; attacking midfielder

Team information
- Current team: PSGC Ciamis
- Number: 7

Youth career
- SSB UNI Bandung
- 2019–2020: Persib Bandung
- 2019–2020: Garuda Select

Senior career*
Years	Team	Apps	(Gls)
2021–2026	Persib Bandung	21	(0)
2025–2026	→ Semen Padang (loan)	6	(0)
2026–	PSGC Ciamis	0	(0)

International career^{‡}
2022–2023	Indonesia U20	11	(0)
- * Club domestic league appearances and goals as of 20 November 2025 ‡ National team caps and goals as of 4 March 2023

Ferdiansyah Cecep Surya (born 15 July 2003) is an Indonesian professional footballer who plays as a winger or attacking midfielder for Championship club PSGC Ciamis.

== Club career ==
=== Persib Bandung ===
He was signed for Persib Bandung to play in Liga 1 in the 2021 season. Ferdiansyah made his first-team debut on 14 December 2022 in a match against Dewa United at the Manahan Stadium, Surakarta.

== International career ==
On 30 May 2022, Ferdiansyah made his debut for an Indonesian youth team against a Venezuela U-20 squad in the 2022 Maurice Revello Tournament in France. In October 2022, it was reported that Ferdi received a call-up from the Indonesia U-20 for a training camp, in Turkey and Spain.

== Career statistics ==
=== Club ===
As of 20 November 2025

Club	Season	League		Cup		Continental		Other		Total	
Club	Season	Apps	Goals	Apps	Goals	Apps	Goals	Apps	Goals	Apps	Goals
Persib Bandung	2021–22	0	0	0	0	0	0	0	0	0	0
Persib Bandung	2022–23	5	0	0	0	0	0	0	0	5	0
Persib Bandung	2023–24	9	0	0	0	0	0	0	0	9	0
Persib Bandung	2024–25	7	0	0	0	1 (Note: Appearances in AFC Champions League Two)	0	0	0	8	0
Semen Padang (loan)	2025–26	6	0	0	0	–		0	0	6	0
Career total		27	0	0	0	1	0	0	0	28	0

== Honours ==
Persib Bandung

- Liga 1: 2023–24, 2024–25
