= Arsan Makarin =

Indonesian footballer

Personal information
- Full name: Arsan Makarin Al Haq
- Date of birth: 8 February 2001 (age 25)
- Place of birth: Sumedang, Indonesia
- Height: 1.66 m (5 ft 5 in)
- Position: Winger

Youth career
- 2011: SSB SSI Arsenal
- 2012: SSB Tiki Taka
- 2015: SSB Super Progressif
- 2017–2018: Persip Pekalongan

Senior career*
Years	Team	Apps	(Gls)
2020–2022	Bandung United	11	(1)
2022–2024	Persib Bandung	18	(0)
2024–2025	PSPS Pekanbaru	8	(2)
2025–2026	Madura United	0	(0)
- * Club domestic league appearances and goals as of 1 December 2024

Arsan Makarin Al Haq (born 8 February 2001) is an Indonesian professional footballer who plays as a winger.

== Club career ==
=== Bandung United ===
On 2021, Makarin signed a one-year contract with Liga 3 club Bandung United. He made 11 league appearances and scored 1 goal for Bandung United in the 2021 Liga 3 (Indonesia).

=== Persib Bandung ===
He was signed for Persib Bandung and played in Liga 1 in 2022–2023 season . Arsan made his league debut on 24 July 2022 in a match against Bhayangkara at the Wibawa Mukti Stadium, Cikarang.

== Honours ==
Persib Bandung

- Liga 1: 2023–24
