= Teja Paku Alam =

Indonesian footballer

Personal information
- Full name: Teja Paku Alam
- Date of birth: 14 September 1994 (age 32)
- Place of birth: Painan, Indonesia
- Height: 1.78 m (5 ft 10 in)
- Position: Goalkeeper

Team information
- Current team: Persib Bandung
- Number: 14

Youth career
- 2011–2012: Deportivo Indonesia
- 2012–2013: Sriwijaya

Senior career*
Years	Team	Apps	(Gls)
2013–2018	Sriwijaya	83	(0)
2019	Semen Padang	25	(0)
2020–	Persib Bandung	109	(0)
Medal record
Men's football
Representing Indonesia
AFF Championship
Runner-up	2016 Myanmar & Philippines	Team
- * Club domestic league appearances and goals as of 22:30, 22 November 2026 (UTC)

Teja Paku Alam (born 14 September 1994) is an Indonesian professional footballer who plays as a goalkeeper for Super League club Persib Bandung.

== Career statistics ==
=== Club ===
As of match played 22 October 2026

Club	Season	League		Cup (Note: Includes Piala Indonesia)		League Cup		Continental		Other (Note: Appearances in Indonesia President's Cup)		Total	
Club	Season	Apps	Goals	Apps	Goals	Apps	Goals	Apps	Goals	Apps	Goals	Apps	Goals
Sriwijaya	2013	2	0	0	0	–		–		0	0	2	0
Sriwijaya	2014	0	0	0	0	–		–		0	0	0	0
Sriwijaya	2015	0	0	0	0	–		–		0	0	0	0
Sriwijaya	2016	23	0	0	0	–		–		0	0	23	0
Sriwijaya	2017	26	0	0	0	–		–		4	0	30	0
Sriwijaya	2018	32	0	0	0	–		–		7	0	39	0
Sriwijaya	Total	83	0	0	0	–		–		11	0	94	0
Semen Padang	2019	25	0	0	0	–		–		1	0	26	0
Persib Bandung	2020	2	0	0	0	–		–		0	0	2	0
Persib Bandung	2021–22	24	0	0	0	–		–		2 (Note: Appearances in Menpora Cup)	0	26	0
Persib Bandung	2022–23	21	0	0	0	–		–		0	0	21	0
Persib Bandung	2023–24	18	0	0	0	–		–		0	0	18	0
Persib Bandung	2024–25	7	0	0	0	–		–		0	0	7	0
Persib Bandung	2025–26	31	0	0	0	–		9 (Note: Appearance(s) in AFC Champions League Two)	0	0	0	40	0
Persib Bandung	2026–27	6	0	0	0	0	0	3	0	2 (Note: Appearance(s) in ASEAN Club Championship)	0	11	0
Career total		217	0	0	0	0	0	12	0	16	0	245	0

== Honours ==
=== Club ===
Sriwijaya U-21

- Indonesia Super League U-21: 2012–13

Sriwijaya FC

- Indonesia President's Cup 3rd place: 2018
- East Kalimantan Governor Cup: 2018

Persib Bandung

- Liga 1/Super League: 2023–24, 2024–25, 2025–26
- Piala Presiden runner-up: 2026

=== International ===
Indonesia

- AFF Championship runner-up: 2016

=== Individual ===
- Super League Player of the Month: January 2022
- Super League Team of the Season: 2021–22
- APPI Indonesian Football Award Best Goalkepper: 2021–22
- APPI Indonesian Football Award Best 11: 2021–22
- Persib Bandung Player of the Year 2021–22
- Super League Save of the Month: August 2024, January 2026

Records

- Most Clean sheets in a single season in Indonesian Super League history
