= Abdul Aziz (footballer, born 1994) =

Indonesian footballer

Personal information
- Full name: Abdul Aziz Lutfi Akbar
- Date of birth: 14 February 1994 (age 32)
- Place of birth: Bandung, Indonesia
- Height: 1.72 m (5 ft 8 in)
- Position: Central midfielder

Team information
- Current team: De Red
- Number: 88

Youth career
- 2011–2014: Persib Bandung
- 2014–2015: Semen Padang

Senior career*
Years	Team	Apps	(Gls)
2016–2017	Persiba Balikpapan	31	(1)
2017	Borneo	9	(0)
2018	PSMS Medan	33	(0)
2019–2026	Persib Bandung	57	(0)
2024	→ Persis Solo (loan)	10	(0)
2026–	De Red	0	(0)
- * Club domestic league appearances and goals as of 24 May 2025

Abdul Aziz Lutfi Akbar (born 14 February 1994) is an Indonesian professional footballer who plays as a central midfielder for Championship club De Red.

== Club career ==
=== Early career ===
In January 2015, Abdul Aziz joined the Futsal Super League team Libido FC Bandung. Abdul also played for in FKB (Futsal Kota Bandung) in 2013.

=== Persiba Balikpapan ===
He made his debut against Arema Cronus in the first week of the 2016 season and made his first goal against Persegres Gresik United in the ninth week.

=== Borneo ===
In 2017, Abdul Aziz signed a contract with Indonesian Liga 1 club Borneo. He made his league debut on 22 July 2017 in a match against Perseru Serui at the Segiri Stadium, Samarinda.

=== PSMS Medan ===
He was signed for PSMS Medan to play in Liga 1 in the 2018 season. Abdul Aziz made his debut on 24 March 2018 in a match against Bali United at the Kapten I Wayan Dipta Stadium, Gianyar.

=== Persib Bandung ===
In 2019, Abdul Aziz signed a one-year contract with Indonesian Liga 1 club Persib Bandung. He made his debut on 23 June 2019 in a match against Madura United at the Si Jalak Harupat Stadium, Soreang.

=== Persis Solo ===
On 14 August 2024, Abdul Aziz Lutfi Akbar joined Persis Solo on a one‑year loan from Persib Bandung for the 2024–25 Liga 1 season.

== Career statistics ==
=== Club ===
As of match played 24 May 2025

Club	Season	League			Cup (Note: Includes Piala Indonesia)		Continental		Other (Note: Appearances in Indonesia President's Cup)		Total	
Club	Season	Division	Apps	Goals	Apps	Goals	Apps	Goals	Apps	Goals	Apps	Goals
Persiba Balikpapan	2016	ISC A	31	1	0	0	0	0	0	0	31	1
Borneo	2017	Liga 1	9	0	0	0	0	0	7	0	16	0
PSMS Medan	2018	Liga 1	33	0	0	0	0	0	6	0	39	0
Persib Bandung	2019	Liga 1	25	0	1	0	0	0	2	0	28	0
Persib Bandung	2020	Liga 1	0	0	0	0	0	0	0	0	0	0
Persib Bandung	2021–22	Liga 1	9	0	0	0	0	0	5 (Note: Appearances in Menpora Cup)	0	14	0
Persib Bandung	2022–23	Liga 1	20	0	0	0	0	0	4	0	24	0
Persib Bandung	2023–24	Liga 1	3	0	0	0	–		0	0	3	0
Persib Bandung	2025–26	Liga 1	0	0	0	0	0	0	0	0	0	0
Persis Solo (loan)	2024–25	Liga 1	10	0	0	0	0	0	0	0	10	0
De Red	2026–27	Championship	0	0	0	0	0	0	6	0	0	0
Career total			140	1	1	0	0	0	24	0	165	1

== Honours ==
Persib Bandung

- Liga 1: 2023–24
