= Bayu Fiqri =

Indonesian footballer

Personal information
- Full name: Bayu Mohamad Fiqri
- Date of birth: 10 August 2001 (age 25)
- Place of birth: Banyuwangi, Indonesia
- Height: 1.76 m (5 ft 9 in)
- Position: Right-back

Team information
- Current team: PSIS Semarang
- Number: 13

Youth career
- PON Jatim
- Barurejo Putra
- 2018–2019: ASIFA

Senior career*
Years	Team	Apps	(Gls)
2019	Semeru	5	(0)
2020–2023	Persib Bandung	16	(0)
2023	→ PSIS Semarang (loan)	16	(1)
2023–2024	PSIS Semarang	13	(0)
2024–2025	Bhayangkara	1	(0)
2025–2026	Kendal Tornado	26	(0)
2026–	PSIS Semarang	1	(0)

International career
2019–2020	Indonesia U19	5	(0)
2021	Indonesia U23	2	(0)
2022	Indonesia	1	(0)
- * Club domestic league appearances and goals as of 25 October 2026

Bayu Mohamad Fiqri (born 10 August 2001) is an Indonesian professional footballer who plays as a right-back for Championship club PSIS Semarang.

== Club career ==
=== Persib Bandung ===
He was signed for Persib Bandung to play in Liga 1 in the 2021 season. Bayu made his first-team debut on 4 September 2021 in a match against Barito Putera at the Indomilk Arena, Tangerang.

==== PSIS Semarang (loan) ====
Persib's versatile defender, Bayu Fiqri, is on loan from Laskar Mahesa Jenar until the end of the 2022–23 Liga 1 season. Bayu made his professional debut on 16 January 2023 in a match against RANS Nusantara at the Pakansari Stadium, Bogor. On 6 April 2023, he scored his first league goal for the club, scoring a free header in a 4–0 victory against PSM Makassar.

== International career ==
In August 2020, Fiqri was included on Indonesia national under-19 football team 30-man list for Training Center in Croatia. He earned his first under-19 cap on 8 September 2020 in 1–7 loss against Croatia U19.

In October 2021, Fiqri was called up to the Indonesia U23 in a friendly match against Tajikistan and Nepal and also prepared for 2022 AFC U-23 Asian Cup qualification in Tajikistan by Shin Tae-yong. On 22 October 2021, Fiqri debuted in the under-23 team when he coming as a starter in a 2–0 win against Nepal U23.

In January 2022, Fiqri was called up to the senior team in a friendly match in Bali by Shin Tae-yong. He earned his first cap in a 3–0 win friendly match against Timor Leste on 30 January 2022.

== Career statistics ==
=== Club ===
As of 25 October 2026

Club	Season	League			Cup		Other		Total	
Club	Season	Division	Apps	Goals	Apps	Goals	Apps	Goals	Apps	Goals
Semeru	2019	Liga 3	5	0	0	0	0	0	5	0
Persib Bandung	2021–22	Liga 1	13	0	0	0	5 (Note: Appearances in Menpora Cup)	0	18	0
Persib Bandung	2022–23	Liga 1	3	0	0	0	0	0	3	0
PSIS Semarang (loan)	2022–23	Liga 1	16	1	0	0	0	0	16	1
PSIS Semarang	2023–24	Liga 1	13	0	0	0	0	0	13	0
Bhayangkara	2024–25	Liga 2	1	0	0	0	0	0	1	0
Kendal Tornado	2025–26	Championship	26	0	0	0	0	0	26	0
PSIS Semarang	2026–27	Championship	1	0	0	0	0	0	1	0
Career total			78	1	0	0	5	0	83	1

=== International ===
As of match played 30 January 2022

Appearances and goals by national team and year
National team	Year	Apps	Goals
Indonesia	2022	1	0
Total		1	0

== Honours ==
Bhayangkara

- Liga 2 runner-up: 2024–25
