= Erwin Ramdani =

Indonesian footballer (born 1993)

Personal information
- Full name: Erwin Ramdani
- Date of birth: 3 November 1993 (age 33)
- Place of birth: Bandung, Indonesia
- Height: 1.69 m (5 ft 7 in)
- Position: Winger

Youth career
- SSB UNI Bandung
- 2010–2012: Persib Bandung

Senior career*
Years	Team	Apps	(Gls)
2014–2015	PSGC Ciamis	16	(6)
2015	PSMS Medan	7	(2)
2015–2017	PS TNI	55	(12)
2018	PSMS Medan	21	(1)
2019–2023	Persib Bandung	53	(5)
2023–2024	RANS Nusantara	16	(0)
2025	Nusantara United	6	(2)
- * Club domestic league appearances and goals as of 15 February 2025

Erwin Ramdani (born 3 November 1993, in Bandung) is an Indonesian professional footballer who plays as a winger. He is also an active Indonesian Army soldier.

== Club career ==
Ramdani was born in Bandung Regency, in Bojongsoang sub-district. He first joined local football academy in Bandung, SSB UNI, and later Persib Bandung U-21. In 2014, Ramdani was signed by PSGC Ciamis for Liga Indonesia Premier Division that year.

Ramdani later joined PS TNI in 2016 for two seasons, and PSMS Medan for 2018 season.

=== PSMS Medan ===
He signed a contract with another Indonesian club PSMS Medan to play in 2018 Liga 1. Ramdani made his league debut on 31 March 2018 in a match against Bhayangkara. On 16 September 2018, Ramdani scored his first goal for the club, scoring in a 1–1 draw over Badak Lampung in the Liga 1.

=== Persib Bandung ===
He would return to his hometown club Persib Bandung in 2019 where he used to play for their U21 squad, he made his league debut for Persib Bandung on 18 May 2019 in a win 3–0 against Persipura Jayapura, he coming as a substitute for Febri Hariyadi in the 76th minute. He scored his first goal for Persib in a match against PSS Sleman during injury time on 30 August 2019.
On 4 November 2021, he scored his first league goals of the season in a 1–3 win over Persela Lamongan.

=== RANS Nusantara ===
Erwin was signed for RANS Nusantara to play in Liga 1 in the 2023–24 season. He made his debut on 3 July 2023 in a match against Persikabo 1973 at the Maguwoharjo Stadium, Sleman.

== Career statistics ==
15 February 2025

Season	Club	League	League		Cup (Note: Includes Piala Indonesia)		Continental		Others (Note: Appearances in Indonesia President's Cup)		Total	
Season	Club	League	Apps	Goals	Apps	Goals	Apps	Goals	Apps	Goals	Apps	Goals
2014	PSGC Ciamis	Premier Division	16	6	-	-	-	-	-	-	16	6
2016	PS TNI	ISC A	28	7	-	-	-	-	-	-	28	7
2017	PS TNI	Liga 1	27	5	-	-	-	-	2	0	29	5
2018	PSMS Medan	Liga 1	21	1	2	1	-	-	4	0	27	2
2019	Persib Bandung	Liga 1	17	1	4	1	-	-	3	2	24	4
2020	Persib Bandung	Liga 1	0	0	-	-	-	-	-	-	0	0
2021	Persib Bandung	Liga 1	22	3	-	-	-	-	5 (Note: Appearances in Menpora Cup)	0	27	3
2022	Persib Bandung	Liga 1	14	1	0	0	-	-	4	0	18	1
2023	RANS Nusantara	Liga 1	16	0	-	-	-	-	0	0	16	0
2025	Nusantara United	Liga 2	6	2	-	-	-	-	0	0	6	2
Career Total			167	26	6	2	0	0	18	2	184	30
