= Robi Darwis =

Indonesian footballer

Personal information
- Full name: Robi Darwis
- Date of birth: 2 August 2003 (age 23)
- Place of birth: Cianjur, Indonesia
- Height: 1.70 m (5 ft 7 in)
- Positions: Defensive midfielder; right-back

Team information
- Current team: Arema
- Number: 24

Youth career
- 2019–2022: Persib Bandung

Senior career*
Years	Team	Apps	(Gls)
2021–2026	Persib Bandung	53	(1)
2021–2022	→ Bandung United (loan)	14	(0)
2023–2024	→ Dewa United (loan)	7	(0)
2026–	Arema	3	(0)

International career^{‡}
2022–2023	Indonesia U20	11	(0)
2023–2025	Indonesia U23	19	(0)
2024–	Indonesia	4	(0)
Medal record
Men's football
Representing Indonesia
ASEAN U-23 Championship
Runner-up	2023 Thailand	Team
Runner-up	2025 Indonesia	Team
- * Club domestic league appearances and goals as of 21 October 2026 ‡ National team caps and goals as of 12 December 2025

Robi Darwis (born 2 August 2003) is an Indonesian professional footballer who plays as a defensive midfielder or right-back for Super League club Arema and the Indonesia national team.

== Club career ==
=== Persib Bandung ===
He was signed for Persib Bandung and played in Liga 1 in 2022–2023 season. Darwis made his league debut on 24 July 2022 in a match against Bhayangkara at the Wibawa Mukti Stadium, Cikarang.

== International career ==
On 14 September 2022, Robi made his debut for Indonesia U-20 national team against Timor-Leste U-20, in which he made two assists, in a 4–0 win in the 2023 AFC U-20 Asian Cup qualification. In October 2022, it was reported that Robi received a call-up from the Indonesia U-20 for a training camp, in Turkey and Spain.

On 25 November 2024, Robi received a called up to the preliminary squad to the Indonesia national team for the 2024 ASEAN Championship. He made his debut against Myanmar, coming on as a substitute in a 1–0 victory.

== Career statistics ==
=== Club ===
As of 3 November 2026

Club	Season	League			Cup		League cup		Continental		Other (Note: Appearances in Piala Presiden)		Total	
Club	Season	Division	Apps	Goals	Apps	Goals	Apps	Goals	Apps	Goals	Apps	Goals	Apps	Goals
Persib Bandung	2022–23	Liga 1	17	1	0	0	0	0	–		0	0	17	1
Persib Bandung	2023–24	Liga 1	7	0	0	0	0	0	–		0	0	7	0
Persib Bandung	2024–25	Liga 1	17	0	0	0	0	0	4 (Note: Appearances in AFC Champions League Two)	0	2	0	23	0
Persib Bandung	2025–26	Super League	12	0	0	0	0	0	2	0	0	0	14	0
Bandung United (loan)	2021–22	Liga 3	14	0	0	0	0	0	–		0	0	14	0
Dewa United (loan)	2023–24	Liga 1	7	0	0	0	0	0	–		0	0	7	0
Arema	2026–27	Super League	3	0	0	0	1	0	–		5	0	9	0
Career total			77	1	0	0	1	0	6	0	7	0	91	1

=== International ===
As of match played 21 December 2024

Appearances and goals by national team and year
National team	Year	Apps	Goals
Indonesia	2024	4	0
Total		4	0

== Honours ==
Persib Bandung

- Liga 1/Super League: 2024–25, 2025–26

Indonesia U23

- AFF U-23 Championship runner-up: 2023, 2025

Individual

- AFF U-23 Championship Team of the Tournament: 2023
