= Frets Butuan =

Indonesian professional footballer

Personal information
- Full name: Frets Listanto Butuan
- Date of birth: 4 June 1996 (age 30)
- Place of birth: Ternate, Indonesia
- Height: 1.67 m (5 ft 6 in)
- Position: Winger

Team information
- Current team: Java United
- Number: 21

Youth career
- SSB Adidas Halbar

Senior career*
Years	Team	Apps	(Gls)
2015–2016	PS TNI	6	(1)
2017–2019	PSMS Medan	50	(9)
2019–2023	Persib Bandung	91	(11)
2023–	Java United	68	(6)
- * Club domestic league appearances and goals as of 19 September 2026

Frets Listanto Butuan (born 4 June 1996) is an Indonesian professional footballer who plays as a winger for Super League club Java United.

== Early career ==
Frets liked football since elementary school, He joined the Adidas Halbar Soccer School to develop himself. Frets came out of Ternate in 2015 while attending the Indonesian National Armed Forces education in Ambon until 2016. After that he first got his service in Kostrad Jakarta. Since entering the army he began the adventure as a migrant.

After that alone pulled PS TNI and joined 2016 Torabika Soccer Championship (TSC). Incidentally the headquarters of PS TNI in Bogor so not far from location serve. But in 2017 when drawn to PSMS Medan to play in Liga 2 until now, because in PSMS many players from PS TNI and also the army.

== Career statistics ==
=== Club ===
As of 19 September 2026

Club	Season	League			Cup (Note: Includes Piala Indonesia)		Continental		Other (Note: Appearances in Indonesia President's Cup)		Total	
Club	Season	Division	Apps	Goals	Apps	Goals	Apps	Goals	Apps	Goals	Apps	Goals
PS TNI	2016	ISC A	6	1	0	0	0	0	0	0	6	1
PSMS Medan	2017	Liga 2	23	3	0	0	0	0	0	0	23	3
PSMS Medan	2018	Liga 1	27	6	0	0	0	0	7	1	34	7
PSMS Medan	Total		50	9	0	0	0	0	7	1	57	10
Persib Bandung	2019	Liga 1	16	3	3	0	0	0	3	2	22	5
Persib Bandung	2020	Liga 1	3	0	0	0	0	0	0	0	3	0
Persib Bandung	2021–22	Liga 1	33	3	0	0	0	0	8 (Note: Appearances in Menpora Cup)	3	41	6
Persib Bandung	2022–23	Liga 1	25	2	0	0	–		4	0	29	2
Persib Bandung	2023–24	Liga 1	14	3	0	0	–		0	0	14	3
Java United	2023–24	Liga 2	14	2	0	0	–		0	0	14	2
Java United	2024–25	Liga 1	26	1	0	0	–		0	0	26	1
Java United	2025–26	Super League	25	3	0	0	–		0	0	25	3
Java United	2026–27	Super League	3	0	0	0	–		0	0	3	0
Career total			215	26	3	0	0	0	22	5	240	31

== Honours ==
=== Club ===
PSMS Medan

- Liga 2 runner-up: 2017
- Indonesia President's Cup 4th place: 2018

Malut United

- Liga 2 third place (play-offs): 2023–24

Individual

- FWP Award 2019: Goal Of The Year
- Persib Bandung Favorite Player of the Year 2021–22
- Liga 2 Team of the Season: 2023–24
