= David Rumakiek =

Indonesian footballer

Personal information
- Full name: David Kevin Wato Rumakiek
- Date of birth: 18 July 1999 (age 27)
- Place of birth: Jayapura, Indonesia
- Height: 1.70 m (5 ft 7 in)
- Position: Left-back

Team information
- Current team: Persekabpas Pasuruan
- Number: 18

Youth career
- 2015–2017: Persipura Jayapura

Senior career*
Years	Team	Apps	(Gls)
2017–2022	Persipura Jayapura	31	(0)
2022–2023	Persib Bandung	1	(0)
2023–2024	Persewar Waropen	11	(0)
2024	Persipura Jayapura	3	(0)
2025–	Persekabpas Pasuruan	0	(0)

International career
2018	Indonesia U19	4	(0)
2019–2020	Indonesia U23	2	(0)
Medal record
Men's football
Representing Indonesia
AFF U-19 Youth Championship
Third place	2018 Indonesia	Team
- * Club domestic league appearances and goals as of 25 September 2024

David Kevin Wato Rumakiek (born 18 July 1999) is an Indonesian professional footballer who plays as a left-back who plays for Liga Nusantara club Persekabpas Pasuruan.

== Club career ==
=== Persipura Jayapura ===
He was signed for Persipura Jayapura to play in Liga 1 in the 2017 season. Rumakiek made his professional league debut on 24 March 2018 in a match against Persela Lamongan at the Mandala Stadium, Jayapura.

=== Persib Bandung ===
Rumakiek was signed for Persib Bandung to play in Liga 1 in the 2022–23 season. He made his league debut on 16 September 2022 in a match against Barito Putera at the Gelora Bandung Lautan Api Stadium, Bandung.

== International career ==
In 2018, Rumakiek represented the Indonesia U-19, in the 2018 AFC U-19 Championship.

== Personal life ==
He is the older brother of Ramai Rumakiek, who is also a footballer.

== Career statistics ==
=== Club ===
As of match played 25 September 2024

Club	Season	League			Cup		Continental		Other		Total	
Club	Season	Division	Apps	Goals	Apps	Goals	Apps	Goals	Apps	Goals	Apps	Goals
Persipura Jayapura	2017	Liga 1	0	0	0	0	0	0	0	0	0	0
Persipura Jayapura	2018	Liga 1	6	0	0	0	0	0	0	0	6	0
Persipura Jayapura	2019	Liga 1	4	0	0	0	0	0	0	0	4	0
Persipura Jayapura	2020	Liga 1	3	0	0	0	0	0	0	0	3	0
Persipura Jayapura	2021–22	Liga 1	18	0	0	0	0	0	0	0	18	0
Persipura Jayapura	Total		31	0	0	0	0	0	0	0	31	0
Persib Bandung	2022–23	Liga 1	1	0	0	0	0	0	2 (Note: Appearances in Indonesia President's Cup)	0	3	0
Persewar Waropen	2023–24	Liga 2	11	0	0	0	0	0	0	0	11	0
Persipura Jayapura	2024–25	Liga 2	3	0	0	0	0	0	0	0	3	0
Persekabpas Pasuruan	2025–26	Liga Nusantara	0	0	0	0	0	0	0	0	0	0
Career total			46	0	0	0	0	0	2	0	48	0

== Honours ==
=== International ===
Indonesia U-19

- AFF U-19 Youth Championship third place: 2018
