= Rachmat Irianto =

Indonesian footballer (born 1999)

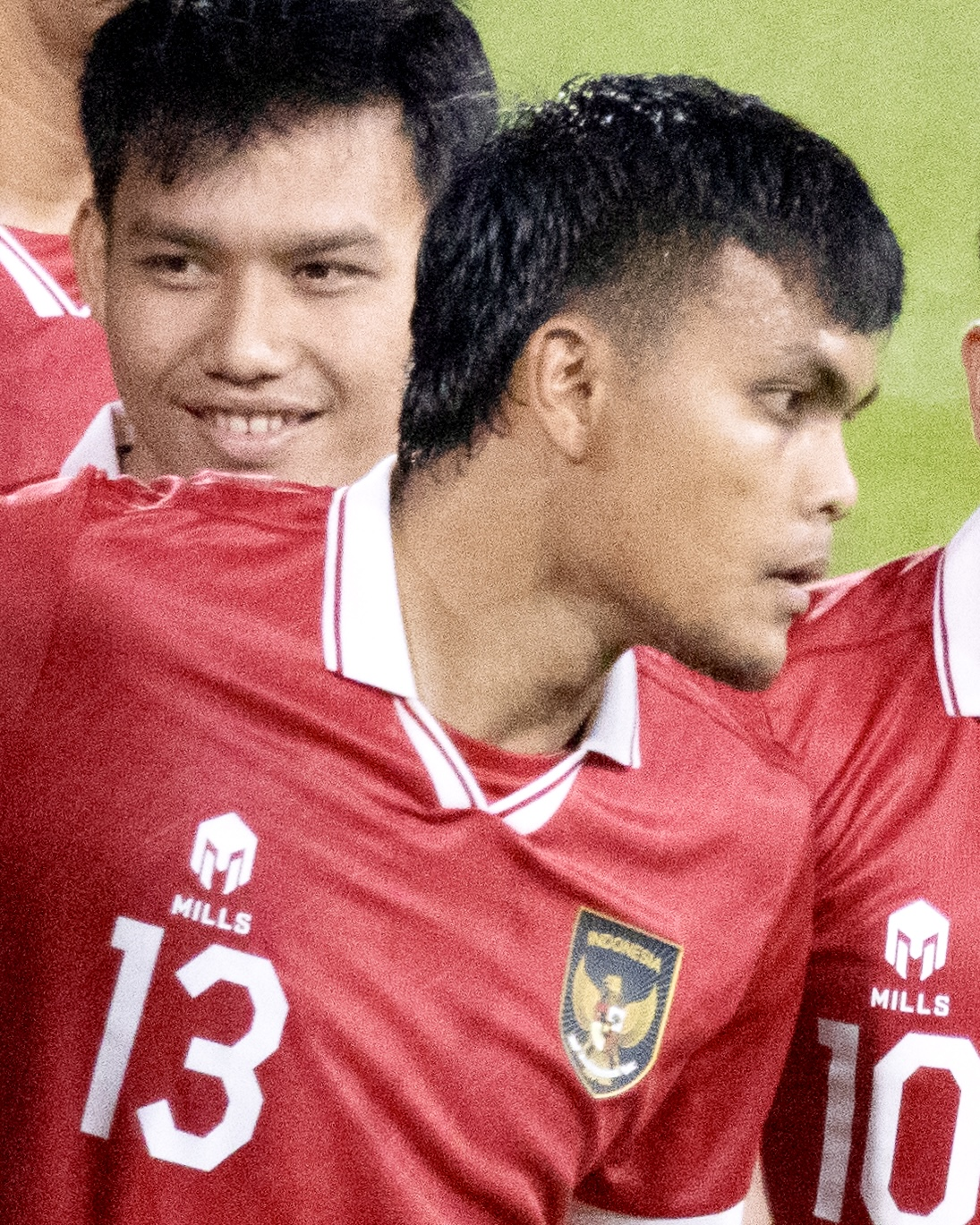
- Irianto playing for Indonesia in 2023

Personal information
- Full name: Rachmat Irianto
- Date of birth: 3 September 1999 (age 27)
- Place of birth: Surabaya, Indonesia
- Height: 1.73 m (5 ft 8 in)
- Positions: Defensive midfielder; defender

Team information
- Current team: Persebaya Surabaya
- Number: 53

Youth career
- 2014–2016: Frenz United
- 2016: Indonesia Muda

Senior career*
Years	Team	Apps	(Gls)
2017–2022	Persebaya Surabaya	46	(1)
2022–2025	Persib Bandung	66	(2)
2025–	Persebaya Surabaya	27	(1)

International career^{‡}
2017–2018	Indonesia U19	16	(0)
2019–2023	Indonesia U23	25	(1)
2021–	Indonesia	31	(3)
Medal record
Men's football
Representing Indonesia
AFF U-19 Youth Championship
Third place	2017 Myanmar
AFF U-22 Youth Championship
Winner	2019 Cambodia	Team
Southeast Asian Games
Silver medal – second place	2019 Philippines	Team
Bronze medal – third place	2021 Vietnam	Team
AFF Championship
Runner-up	2020 Singapore	Team
- * Club domestic league appearances and goals as of 23:15, 22 November 2026 (UTC) ‡ National team caps and goals as of 21:39, 21 November 2023 (UTC+7)

Rachmat Irianto (born 3 September 1999) is an Indonesian professional footballer who plays for Super League club Persebaya Surabaya and the Indonesia national team. Mainly a defensive midfielder, he can also play as a centre-back or a full-back. He is the son of former footballer, Bejo Sugiantoro and was named as a tribute to Bejo's compatriot at Persebaya, Eri Irianto.

== Club career ==
=== Persebaya Surabaya ===
Irianto in 2017, at the age of 17, joined his hometown club Persebaya Surabaya, where his father works as an assistant coach, and helped the club to win a promotion from Liga 2. He made his Indonesian Liga 1 first-team debut for Persebaya Surabaya when he was part of the starting lineup of a 2018 Liga 1 match against Barito Putera on 8 April 2018, in which Persebaya lost.

On 21 July 2019, Irianto scored his first league goal in the 2019 Liga 1 for Persebaya in a 1–1 draw over TIRA-Persikabo at the Gelora Bung Tomo Stadium. He became a regular feature at the backline in the 2019 Liga 1 season. In less than four years since his entry and after the departure of several senior players in 2021, he became the captain of the senior team at the young age of 21.

=== Persib Bandung ===
Irianto was signed for Persib Bandung to play in Liga 1 in the 2022–23 season. On 24 July 2022, Irianto made his league debut by starting in a 2–2 draw against Bhayangkara and he also scored his first goal for the team, he scored in the 42nd minute at Wibawa Mukti Stadium.

== International career ==
On 31 May 2017, Irianto made his debut against Brazil U20 in the 2017 Toulon Tournament in France. Irianto is also one of the players who strengthened the Indonesia U19 team that won third place in the 2018 AFC U-19 Championship.

Irianto was in the Indonesia team that won a silver medal at the 2019 Southeast Asian Games. He received a call up to the senior Indonesia national football team in May 2021 and was projected to captain the team in official matches. He earned his first senior cap in a 25 May 2021 friendly match in Dubai against Afghanistan. On 9 December 2021, he scored his first goal for Indonesia with scored a brace in the team's opening 2020 AFF Championship against Cambodia.

On 8 June 2022, Irianto scored a goal in a 2023 AFC Asian Cup qualification match against Kuwait, in a 2–1 win.

== Career statistics ==
=== Club ===
As of 11 April 2026

Club	Season	League			Cup (Note: Includes Piala Indonesia)		League Cup		Continental		Other (Note: Appearances in Indonesia President's Cup)		Total	
Club	Season	Division	Apps	Goals	Apps	Goals	Apps	Goals	Apps	Goals	Apps	Goals	Apps	Goals
Persebaya Surabaya	2017	Liga 2	3	0	0	0			–		0	0	3	0
Persebaya Surabaya	2018	Liga 1	4	0	0	0			–		0	0	4	0
Persebaya Surabaya	2019	Liga 1	17	1	2	0			–		0	0	19	1
Persebaya Surabaya	2020	Liga 1	1	0	0	0			–		0	0	1	0
Persebaya Surabaya	2021–22	Liga 1	21	0	0	0			–		4 (Note: Appearances in Menpora Cup)	0	25	0
Persebaya Surabaya	Total		46	1	2	0			–		4	0	52	1
Persib Bandung	2022–23	Liga 1	25	1	0	0			0	0	1	0	26	1
Persib Bandung	2023–24	Liga 1	29	1	0	0			–		0	0	29	1
Persib Bandung	2024–25	Liga 1	12	0	0	0			4 (Note: Appearances in AFC Champions League Two)	0	0	0	16	0
Persib Bandung	Total		66	2	0	0			4	0	1	0	71	2
Persebaya Surabaya	2025–26	Super League	20	1	0	0			–		0	0	20	1
Persebaya Surabaya	2026-27	Super League	7	0	0	0	1	0	–		0	0	8	0
Persebaya Surabaya	Total		27	1	0	0	1	0	–		0	0	28	1
Career total			139	4	2	0	1	0	4	0	5	0	151	4

=== International ===
As of match played 21 November 2023

Appearances and goals by national team and year
National team	Year	Apps	Goals
Indonesia	2021	15	2
Indonesia	2022	10	1
Indonesia	2023	5	0
Total		30	3

As of match played 21 November 2023
Scores and results list Indonesia's goal tally first, score column indicates score after each Irianto goal.

List of international goals scored by Rachmat Irianto
No.	Date	Venue	Cap	Opponent	Score	Result	Competition
1	9 December 2021	Bishan Stadium, Bishan, Singapore	9	Cambodia	1–0	4–2	2020 AFF Championship
2	9 December 2021	Bishan Stadium, Bishan, Singapore	9	Cambodia	3–0	4–2	2020 AFF Championship
3	8 June 2022	Jaber Al-Ahmad International Stadium, Kuwait City, Kuwait	20	Kuwait	2–1	2–1	2023 AFC Asian Cup qualification

== Honours ==
Persebaya Surabaya

- Liga 2: 2017
- Piala Presiden: 2026; runner-up: 2019
- East Java Governor Cup: 2020

Persib Bandung

- Liga 1: 2023–24, 2024–25

Indonesia U-19

- AFF U-19 Youth Championship third place: 2017

Indonesia U-23

- AFF U-22 Youth Championship: 2019
- SEA Games silver medal: 2019; bronze medal: 2021

Indonesia

- AFF Championship runner-up: 2020

Individual

- Super League Goal of the Month: January 2026
