= 2024–25 Persib Bandung season =

Indonesian football club season

Persib Bandung
2024–25 season
- Owner: PT Persib Bandung Bermartabat
- CEO: Glenn Sugita
- Coach: Bojan Hodak
- Stadium: Si Jalak Harupat Stadium (until 1 November and for ACL Two matches); Gelora Bandung Lautan Api Stadium
- Liga 1: 1st
- AFC Champions League Two: Group stage
- Top goalscorer: League: Tyronne del Pino (18); All: Tyronne del Pino (21)
- Highest home attendance: 28,335 vs. Persis; Liga 1, 24 May 2025
- Lowest home attendance: 2,111 vs. Lion City Sailors; ACL Two, 24 October 2024 (excluding matches played behind closed doors)
- Average home league attendance: 14,739
- Biggest win: 4–1 vs. PSBS (H); Liga 1, 9 August 2024; 4–1 vs. Persik (H); Liga 1, 5 March 2025; 4–1 vs. Semen Padang (A); Liga 1, 10 March 2025; 3–0 vs. PSS (H); Liga 1, 26 April 2025
- Biggest defeat: 1–4 vs. Persebaya (A); Liga 1, 1 March 2025
Home colours	Away colours	Third colours

The 2024–25 season was the 65th season in the history of Persib Bandung, and the club's 28th consecutive season in the top-flight of Indonesian football since it became fully professional. In addition to the domestic league, Persib also participated in the AFC Champions League Two, returning to Asian competition after a nine-year absence. The season covers the period from 1 July 2024 to 30 June 2025.

On 5 May 2025, Persib successfully defended their Liga 1 title with three games to spare after title rivals Persebaya drew 3–3 away at Persik. It was also the club's first league title through a double round-robin format.

== Review ==
=== Background ===
The 2023–24 season saw the introduction of a championship series postseason for Liga 1 to determine its champion which would be contested by the top four teams in the regular series. Three matches into the season, head coach Luis Milla resigned from his role due to family matters. After a brief stint under caretaker Yaya Sunarya, Bojan Hodak resigned from Kuala Lumpur City to join the club and fill in the vacant head coach post. Under his leadership, Maung Bandung would end up finishing the regular series in second place, qualifying them for the championship series. After beating Bali United in the semifinals, Persib defeated Madura United 6–1 on aggregate in the Liga 1 finals to secure their first league title in a decade. It also gave the club entry into the AFC Champions League Two group stage for their first Asian campaign in nine years.

=== Pre-season ===
Persib would begin the season with Si Jalak Harupat Stadium serving as their homebase due to renovations continuing at Gelora Bandung Lautan Api Stadium. On transfers, goalkeeper Fitrul Dwi Rustapa was the first player to be departing the club during pre-season on 25 June as he left to join Bali United. A week later, winger Arsan Makarin also departed to join Liga 2 side PSPS. The first signing came the following day with Mateo Kocijan joining from Albanian club Partizani. On 5 July, defender Alberto Rodríguez transferred to Indian Super League side Mohun Bagan. After a training session on 9 July, head coach Bojan Hodak confirmed that Italian midfielder Stefano Beltrame will not be retained by the club. Three more signings were made before Persib participates in the Piala Presiden preseason tournament, defender Gustavo França joined from Tondela on 10 July, striker Dimas Drajad moved from Persikabo 1973 on 14 July, and midfielder Adam Alis joined on 18 July for a six-month loan from Borneo Samarinda with an option to make a permanent transfer to the club.

As hosts in Group A, Persib began their Piala Presiden involvement on 19 July with a 2–0 win over PSM with Ciro Alves scoring first followed by a Nermin Haljeta own goal. Following that, they faced Borneo Samarinda on 22 July where a late Berguinho goal saw them lose 0–1. On 25 July, forward Ezra Walian completed a transfer to Persik. Persib's involvement in the tournament ended on 26 July after losing 0–1 to Persis in their final group stage match. The next day, Persib signed free agent Mailson Lima who last played for Kazakhstani club FC Aksu.

=== August ===
On 4 August, Zalnaldo secured a six-month loan move to PSIS as goalkeeper Reky Rahayu was left out of the club's plans and released. Persib began their title defense on 9 August with a 4–1 home win over newly promoted PSBS with David da Silva scoring a brace. On 13 August, full-back Eriyanto completed his move to Persiraja in Liga 2. The following day on 14 August, midfielder Abdul Aziz completed a season-long loan move to Persis. Five days later, Maung Bandung were held to a 2–2 draw against Dewa United at Gianyar on despite a Tyronne del Pino brace. On 22 August, goalkeeper Satrio Azhar completed his move to Persiku. The month concluded with a 1–1 draw at home to Arema where Dimas Drajad scored his first goal for the club.

=== September ===
After the first international break of the season, Persib returned to action on 11 September with a goalless draw against PSM at Batakan Stadium before taking their second win of the season, 2–1 at home to 10-men PSIS four days later. Their AFC Champions League Two campaign began with a late 0–1 defeat to Thailand's Port courtesy of a late Willen winner. Persib would return to winning ways in the first Indonesian El Clásico of the season, beating Persija 2–0 at home in a match where both sides had a player sent off. However, the club would later receive sanctions from the PSSI Disciplinary Committee including having to host two matches behind closed doors and three matches on partial stadium closure along with a fine of Rp295 million after crowd troubles occurred when the match ended. Persib would conclude the month with a 2–2 draw away to Madura United as they ended the month fourth in the league on 13 points.

=== October ===
Persib began the month with an away trip to Zhejiang in the AFC Champions League Two. An attempted clearance header by Victor Igbonefo fell into the path of Jean Evrard Kouassi for the game's only goal as the Chinese club won 1–0, leaving Maung Bandung still without a point in the competition as the international break came. Persib returned to action on October 18 in their first of two behind closed doors matches, beating Persebaya 2–0 to end their opponents unbeaten start to the season. The AFC Champions League Two campaign resumed against Lion City Sailors at Si Jalak Harupat Stadium where Tyronne del Pino's opener late in the first half was cancelled out by Bailey Wright's header early in the second half. Both sides finished the match with 10 men each in a 1–1 draw, giving Persib their first point in the group stage. The club would end October by getting their first away win of the season, courtesy of a 2–0 victory over Persik at Kediri. The result leaves Persib second in the league on 19 points, only one point behind leaders Bali United.

=== November ===
The next month began with Persib's second home match without supporters against Semen Padang who held them out to a 1–1 draw, extending their unbeaten start in the league to 10 matches. The reverse fixture against Lion City Sailors was next on 7 November in the AFC Champions League Two at Jalan Besar Stadium. After going two goals down after 23 minutes, Maung Bandung staged a late comeback with two goals scored during added time to win the match 3–2 and secure their first win in Asian competition this season. Persib's next match came after the final international break of the year against Borneo Samarinda with the club returning to Gelora Bandung Lautan Api Stadium after it went through eight months of renovation work. A Ciro Alves goal in the 36th minute gave Maung Bandung a 1–0 win, overtaking Borneo Samarinda in the standings and keeping them one point off Persebaya at the top. November concluded with a trip to the BG Stadium to face off against Port again in the AFC Champions League Two. David da Silva headed late to rescue a point for Persib in a 2–2 draw, leaving them bottom of the group ahead of the final matchday of the group stage.

=== December ===
The final month of 2024 started with the last matchday of the AFC Champions League Two group stage on 5 December. Persib needed to win at home against Zhejiang while hoping Port win away against Lion City Sailors. Maung Bandung lost their final match 3–4 to the Chinese side, eliminating them from the competition with Port losing 5–2 to the Sailors on the other match sending Zhejiang out as well. The club returned to league action away against PSS, coming back from a goal down to win 2–1 at Manahan Stadium. They followed this result up with a 2–0 home win over Malut United and a 2–1 win away against 10-men Barito Putera at Bantul, though Dedi Kusnandar suffered a season-ending injury in the latter match. Persib would take two more wins to close out the year, a 3–1 home triumph over Persita and a 1–0 away victory against Persis. Both matches saw the opposition have a player sent off as Maung Bandung ended the year top of the league on 38 points after Persebaya lost their match against Bali United.

=== January ===
On 1 January, Persib made the transfer of Adam Alis permanent on a two-and-a-half-year contract while Faris Abdul Hafizh moved on loan to Gresik United for three months. The club's first match in 2025 was an away trip against Bali United, the fixture had been postponed from 1 December to 7 January due to Persib's participation in the AFC Champions League Two. The match saw 13 yellow cards given out including one for each head coach. Rahmat Arjuna headed the opening goal early in the second half to give the Bali United the lead. Maung Bandung needed a late Gustavo França goal deep into added time after the hosts had Yabes Roni sent off for a second yellow to draw the match 1–1 and keep their unbeaten record in the league. The next day, Persib signed forward Gervane Kastaneer from Spanish club Castellón. Their next match was a trip to Jayapura to take on PSBS at Jayapura. After Nick Kuipers was shown second yellow and sent off, Abel Argañaraz scored for the hosts to give them the lead. It would take a Tyronne del Pino free kick on the 85th minute for Persib to secure another 1–1 draw. On 14 January, Ahmad Agung joined the club on loan from Persik for six months to strengthen Persib's midfield options after the injuries to Rachmat Irianto and Dedi Kusnandar. Maung Bandung host Dewa United at Gelora Bandung Lautan Api Stadium for the next fixture. The club would have its first defeat in the league this season with former Persib player Ricky Kambuaya assisting Alex Martins and Septian Bagaskara scoring goals for the visitors in a 0–2 home loss. Persib would end the month back in winning ways and remain top of the league with a 3–1 away win against Arema in Blitar where new signing Kastaneer scored his first goal for the club.

=== February ===
Persib began February with a home match against PSM, Ciro Alves scored on the 74th minute to give them a 1–0 win. The next match was a trip to Jatidiri Stadium against PSIS. Nick Kuipers headed in the only goal of the game after 35 minutes for another 1–0 win where Maung Bandung had to play most of the match with 10 men after Mateo Kocijan received a second yellow in the 41st minute. On 16 February, the second Indonesian El Clásico took place against Persija at Patriot Stadium. Persib fell two goals behind in the first half but scored two in the second half to secure a 2–2 draw. The final match of the month saw the club being held to a goalless home draw against Madura United as Maung Bandung remain in first on 51 points, eight points ahead of Dewa United in second place.

=== March ===
The next month began with an away trip to Gelora Bung Tomo Stadium for a match against Persebaya on 1 March. After a goalless first half, Persib would have their first away league defeat of the season as the hosts won 4–1. In their next match, a home fixture against Persik, Maung Bandung ended their three-match winless run with a 4–1 victory over the visitors who went down to 10 men for the last 18 minutes. On 8 March, winger Mailson Lima was released by the club having not scored a goal during his time with Persib. A visit to Padang was next to face Semen Padang. After going behind through a Bruno Gomes penalty on the 37th minute, Persib staged a second half comeback with goals from Tyronne del Pino, Adam Alis, and a Beckham Putra brace for another 4–1 win. The club remained at the summit of Liga 1 on 57 points, maintaining their eight-point advantage over Dewa United heading into the March international break.

=== April ===
After the international break, Persib returned to action against Borneo Samarinda at Segiri Stadium on 11 April. Mariano Peralta and Tyronne del Pino scored braces for each side in a 2–2 draw. The following match was a home fixture against Bali United on 18 April. After going behind from an Irfan Jaya goal in the 23rd minute, Beckham Putra and Gustavo França scored as Maung Bandung completed the comeback to win 2–1. PSS came next on 26 April, another brace from Tyronne and a goal from França secured a 3–0 win for Persib. Results from the rest of the week saw the club 11 points ahead of Dewa United and Persebaya in the Liga 1 title race with only four matches left.

=== May ===
Persib entered May with a chance to secure the Liga 1 title if they win their away trip to Malut United on 2 May. No goals were scored in the first half before Wahyu Prasetyo headed the hosts in front. Ciro Alves later received a red card as the score remained at 1–0, delaying the title clinch for Maung Bandung. Dewa United had already ceded their title challenge after being held earlier to a 1–1 draw away at Barito Putera, leaving Persebaya as the only club left able to overtake Persib. On 5 May, Persib were crowned Liga 1 champions again after Persebaya were held to a 3–3 draw away at Persik. After their title defence was secured, the club narrowly avoided defeat at home to Barito Putera after going a goal and a man down courtesy of a late own goal in a 1–1 draw. Another draw came away at Persita as both sides traded goals with the match ending 2–2 at Indomilk Arena. On 24 May, Persib defeated Persis 3–2 in their final home match of the season as they lifted the Liga 1 trophy, the first time they did so at their home stadium.

== Squad information ==
Note: Age and contract details as of 30 June 2025

No.	Name	Nat.	Date of birth (age)	Height	Signed from	Year signed	Contract ends	Ref.
Goalkeepers
1	Kevin Ray Mendoza	(Philippines)	29 September 1994 (age 30)	1.87 m	(Malaysia) Kuala Lumpur City	2023	2025	
14	Teja Paku Alam	(Indonesia)	14 September 1994 (age 30)	1.77 m	(Indonesia) Semen Padang	2020	2027	
50	Fitrah Maulana	(Indonesia)	24 May 2006 (age 19)	1.86 m	Youth academy	2024		
99	Sheva Sanggasi	(Indonesia)	1 May 2004 (age 21)	1.82 m	Youth academy	2023	2025	
Defenders
2	Nick Kuipers	(Netherlands)	8 October 1992 (age 32)	1.93 m	(Netherlands) ADO Den Haag	2019	2025	
4	Gustavo França	(Brazil)	20 July 1996 (age 28)	1.88 m	(Portugal) Tondela	2024	2025	
5	Kakang Rudianto	(Indonesia)	2 February 2003 (age 22)	1.85 m	Youth academy	2020	2026	
12	Henhen Herdiana	(Indonesia)	10 September 1995 (age 29)	1.69 m	Youth academy	2017	2027	
16	Achmad Jufriyanto	(Indonesia)	7 February 1987 (age 38)	1.80 m	(Malaysia) Kuala Lumpur	2019	2025	
27	Zalnando	(Indonesia)	25 December 1996 (age 28)	1.76 m	(Indonesia) Sriwijaya	2019	2026	
30	Faris Abdul Hafizh	(Indonesia)	21 July 2003 (age 21)	1.72 m	Youth academy	2024	2025	
32	Victor Igbonefo	(Indonesia)	10 October 1985 (age 39)	1.83 m	(Thailand) PTT Rayong	2020	2025	
56	Rezaldi Hehanussa	(Indonesia)	7 November 1995 (age 29)	1.78 m	(Indonesia) Persija	2023	2026	
97	Edo Febriansah	(Indonesia)	25 July 1997 (age 27)	1.78 m	(Indonesia) RANS Nusantara	2023	2025	
Midfielders
6	Robi Darwis	(Indonesia)	22 August 2003 (age 21)	1.70 m	Youth academy	2021	2026	
7	Beckham Putra	(Indonesia)	29 October 2001 (age 23)	1.64 m	Youth academy	2018	2028	
10	Tyronne del Pino	(Spain)	27 January 1991 (age 34)	1.82 m	(Thailand) Nakhon Ratchasima	2023	2025	
11	Dedi Kusnandar	(Indonesia)	23 July 1991 (age 33)	1.75 m	(Malaysia) Sabah	2017	2027	
13	Febri Hariyadi	(Indonesia)	19 February 1996 (age 29)	1.68 m	Youth academy	2015	2026	
17	Mateo Kocijan	(Croatia)	27 March 1995 (age 30)	1.89 m	(Albania) Partizani	2024	2025	
18	Adam Alis	(Indonesia)	19 December 1993 (age 31)	1.72 m	(Indonesia) Borneo Samarinda	2024 (loan); 2025	2027	
23	Marc Klok	(Indonesia)	20 April 1993 (age 32)	1.77 m	(Indonesia) Persija	2021	2027	
37	Ferdiansyah Cecep	(Indonesia)	15 July 2003 (age 21)	1.72 m	Youth academy	2021	2026	
53	Rachmat Irianto	(Indonesia)	3 September 1999 (age 25)	1.73 m	(Indonesia) Persebaya	2022	2025	
71	Adzikry Fadlillah	(Indonesia)	26 February 2003 (age 22)	1.61 m	Youth academy	2024		
88	Ahmad Agung	(Indonesia)	9 March 1996 (age 29)	1.80 m	(Indonesia) Persik	2025 (loan)	2025	
Forwards
8	Gervane Kastaneer	(Curaçao)	9 June 1996 (age 29)	1.85 m	(Spain) Castellón	2025	2026	
9	Dimas Drajad	(Indonesia)	30 March 1997 (age 28)	1.77 m	(Indonesia) Persikabo 1973	2024	2027	
19	David da Silva	(Brazil)	12 November 1989 (age 35)	1.83 m	(Malaysia) Terengganu	2021	2025	
77	Ciro Alves	(Brazil)	18 April 1989 (age 36)	1.75 m	(Indonesia) Persikabo 1973	2022	2025	
96	Ryan Kurnia	(Indonesia)	26 June 1996 (age 28)	1.80 m	(Indonesia) Persikabo 1973	2023	2025	
Out on loan
–	Abdul Aziz	(Indonesia)	14 February 1994 (age 31)	1.72 m	(Indonesia) PSMS	2019	2026	
Player(s) transferred out during this season
94	Mailson Lima	(Cape Verde)	29 May 1994 (age 31)	1.78 m	Free agent	2024	2025	

== Coaching staff ==
Position	Staff
Head coach	(Croatia) Bojan Hodak
Assistant coach	(Croatia) Igor Tolić
Goalkeeping coach	(Brazil) Luizinho Passos
Assistant goalkeeping coach	(Indonesia) I Made Wirawan
Fitness coaches	(Croatia) Miro Petric (Indonesia) Yaya Sunarya
Club doctor	(Indonesia) Wira Prasetya
Physiotherapist	(Indonesia) Benidektus Adi Prianto
Masseurs	(Brazil) Geraldo Santos (Indonesia) Iyang Mulyana (Indonesia) Tatang Sutisna
Kitman	(Indonesia) Fikri Apriansyah

Last updated: 24 May 2025
Source: Liga Indonesia Baru Persib detik.com

== Management and officials ==
Position	Staff
Club manager	(Indonesia) Umuh Muchtar
Club secretary	(Indonesia) Irfan Suryadireja
Media officer	(Indonesia) Muhammad Jatnika Sadili
Photographers	(Indonesia) Atreeyu Andrey Pamungkas (Indonesia) Pandu Satiagraha Effendi

Last updated: 24 May 2025
Source: Liga Indonesia Baru

== Transfers ==
=== Transfers in ===
Date	Pos.	Name	From	Fee	Ref.
3 July 2024	MF	(Croatia) Mateo Kocijan	(Albania) Partizani	Free transfer	
10 July 2024	DF	(Brazil) Gustavo França	(Portugal) Tondela	Free transfer	
14 July 2024	FW	(Indonesia) Dimas Drajad	(Indonesia) Persikabo 1973	Free transfer	
27 July 2024	FW	(Cape Verde) Mailson Lima	Free agent (Note: Previous club: FC Aksu)	Free transfer	
1 January 2025	MF	(Indonesia) Adam Alis	(Indonesia) Borneo Samarinda	Undisclosed	
8 January 2025	FW	(Curaçao) Gervane Kastaneer	(Spain) Castellón	Undisclosed	

=== Transfers out ===
Date	Pos.	Name	To	Fee	Ref.
25 June 2024	GK	(Indonesia) Fitrul Dwi Rustapa	(Indonesia) Bali United	Free transfer	
2 July 2024	MF	(Indonesia) Arsan Makarin	(Indonesia) PSPS	Free transfer	
5 July 2024	DF	(Spain) Alberto Rodríguez	(India) Mohun Bagan	Free transfer	
9 July 2024	MF	(Italy) Stefano Beltrame	Released (Note: Joined Masfout Club on 14 February 2025)		
25 July 2024	FW	(Indonesia) Ezra Walian	(Indonesia) Persik	Free transfer	
4 August 2024	GK	(Indonesia) Reky Rahayu	Released (Note: Joined PSMS on 10 August 2025)		
13 August 2024	DF	(Indonesia) Eriyanto	(Indonesia) Persiraja	Free transfer	
22 August 2024	GK	(Indonesia) Satrio Azhar	(Indonesia) Persiku	Free transfer	
8 March 2025	FW	(Cape Verde) Mailson Lima	Released (Note: Joined Hibernians on 12 September 2025)		

=== Loans in ===
Start date	Pos.	Name	From	End date	Ref.
18 July 2024	MF	(Indonesia) Adam Alis	(Indonesia) Borneo Samarinda	31 December 2024	
14 January 2025	MF	(Indonesia) Ahmad Agung	(Indonesia) Persik	30 June 2025	

=== Loans out ===
Start date	Pos.	Name	To	End date	Ref.
4 August 2024	DF	(Indonesia) Zalnaldo	(Indonesia) PSIS	31 December 2024	
14 August 2024	MF	(Indonesia) Abdul Aziz	(Indonesia) Persis	30 June 2025	
1 January 2025	DF	(Indonesia) Faris Abdul Hafizh	(Indonesia) Gresik United	30 March 2025	

== Pre-season and friendlies ==
=== Piala Presiden ===
==== Group stage ====
Persib were drawn in Group A for the tournament, along with Persis, PSM, and Borneo Samarinda.

Pos	Team	Pld	W	D	L	GF	GA	GD	Pts	Qualification
1	Borneo Samarinda	3	2	1	0	3	0	+3	7	Advance to the semi-finals
2	Persis	3	1	1	1	4	2	+2	4	Advance to the semi-finals
3	Persib (H)	3	1	0	2	2	5	−3	3	
4	PSM	3	0	2	1	3	5	−2	2	

Source: detik.com
Rules for classification: 1) Points; 2) Head-to-head points; 3) Head-to-head goal difference; 4) Head-to-head goals scored; 5) Goal difference; 6) Goals scored; 7) Fair-play points; 8) Draw.
(H) Hosts

19 July 2024 Piala Presiden	Persib	2–0	PSM	Bandung, West Java
15:30 WIB	Ciro 15'; Haljeta 42' (o.g.)	Report		Stadium: Si Jalak Harupat Stadium; Attendance: 9,557; Referee: Rio Permana Putra (Riau)

22 July 2024 Piala Presiden	Persib	0–1	Borneo Samarinda	Bandung, West Java
19:30 WIB		Report	Berguinho 90+2'	Stadium: Si Jalak Harupat Stadium; Attendance: 5,496; Referee: Erfan Efendi (East Java)

25 July 2024 Piala Presiden	Persib	0–1	Persis	Bandung, West Java
19:30 WIB		Report	Sananta 20'	Stadium: Si Jalak Harupat Stadium; Attendance: 9,174; Referee: Candra (West Sumatra)

== Competitions ==
=== Overall record ===
Competition	First match	Last match	Starting round	Final position	Record							
Competition	First match	Last match	Starting round	Final position	Pld	W	D	L	GF	GA	GD	Win %
Liga 1	9 August 2024	24 May 2025	Matchday 1	Winners	34	19	12	3	60	33	+27	55.88
AFC Champions League Two	19 September 2024	5 December 2024	Group stage	Group stage	6	1	2	3	9	11	−2	16.67
Total					40	20	14	6	69	44	+25	50.00

Source: Competitions

=== Liga 1 ===
==== League table ====
Pos	Team	Pld	W	D	L	GF	GA	GD	Pts	Qualification or relegation
1	Persib (C)	34	19	12	3	60	33	+27	69	Qualification for the 2025–26 AFC Champions League Two qualifying play-offs
2	Dewa United	34	17	10	7	65	33	+32	61	Qualification for the 2025–26 AFC Challenge League group stage
3	Malut United	34	15	12	7	48	33	+15	57	
4	Persebaya	34	15	11	8	41	38	+3	56 (Note: Ranked on head-to-head points: Persebaya 4, Borneo Samarinda 1.)	
5	Borneo Samarinda	34	16	8	10	50	38	+12	56	

Source: Liga 1 2024–25
Rules for classification: 1) Points; 2) Head-to-head points; 3) Head-to-head goal difference; 4) Head-to-head goals scored; 5) Goal difference; 6) Goals scored; 7) Fair-play points; 8) Drawing of lots.
(C) Champions

==== Matches ====
9 August 2024 1	Persib	4–1	PSBS	Bandung, West Java
19:00 WIB	da Silva 18', 85'; Beckham 65'; Ciro 77'	Report	Alexsandro 52'	Stadium: Si Jalak Harupat Stadium; Attendance: 10,949; Referee: Rio Permana Putra (Riau)

19 August 2024 2	Dewa United	2–2	Persib	Gianyar, Bali
20:00 WITA	Bagaskara 32'; Ferian (yellow card) 45+2'; Egy 74'; Kambuaya (yellow card) 88'	Report	Tyronne 21', 48'; Kocijan (yellow card) 55'	Stadium: Kapten I Wayan Dipta; Attendance: 0 Referee: Heru Cahyono (Jakarta)

25 August 2024 3	Persib	1–1	Arema	Bandung, West Java
19:00 WIB	Tyronne (yellow card) 25'; Adam Alis (yellow card) 32'; Edo (yellow card) 38'; Kuipers (yellow card) 40'; Dimas 45+7'	Report	Bayu (yellow card) 27'; Oliveira (yellow card) 38'; Dalberto 39', (yellow card) 59'; Alfarizi (yellow card) 55'; Arkhan (yellow card) 77'	Stadium: Si Jalak Harupat Stadium; Attendance: 17,337; Referee: Adham Makhadmeh (Jordan)

11 September 2024 4	PSM	0–0	Persib	Balikpapan, East Kalimantan
16:30 WITA	Adilson (yellow card) 62'; Syahrul (yellow card) 66'; Dzaky (yellow card) 90+5'	Report	Henhen (yellow card) 24'; Ryan (yellow card) 75'	Stadium: Batakan Stadium; Attendance: 2,478; Referee: Fibay Rahmatullah (Banten)

15 September 2024 5	Persib	2–1	PSIS	Bandung, West Java
19:00 WIB	Tyronne 17'; França 40'; Edo (yellow card) 47'; Irianto (yellow card) 67'; Ryan (yellow card) 85'; Dedi (yellow card) 90+5'	Report	Riyan 36'; Ferrari (yellow card) 75'; Diarra (yellow card) 77'; Fernandinho (red card) 89'	Stadium: Si Jalak Harupat Stadium; Attendance: 9,670; Referee: Steven Yubel Poli (North Sulawesi)

23 September 2024 6	Persib	2–0	Persija	Bandung, West Java
15:30 WIB	Dimas 38'; Beckham (yellow card) 59'; Klok (red card) 60'; Kocijan (yellow card) 75'; Ryan 83'; França (yellow card) 90'	Report	Firza (yellow card) 24' (yellow-red card) 28'; Simanjuntak (yellow card) 42'; Šimić (yellow card) 77'	Stadium: Si Jalak Harupat Stadium; Attendance: 16,078; Referee: Nazmi Nasaruddin (Malaysia)

28 September 2024 7	Madura United	2–2	Persib	Pamekasan, East Java
19:00 WIB	Lulinha 7', 61', (yellow card) 45'; Wehrmann (yellow card) 11'; Rusadi (yellow card) 45'; Dida (yellow card) 90'	Report	França (yellow card) 10'; Tyronne 30'; Adam Alis 31'	Stadium: Gelora Ratu Pamelingan Stadium; Attendance: 839; Referee: Muhammad Tri Santoso (Yogyakarta)

18 October 2024 8	Persib	2–0	Persebaya	Bandung, West Java
15:30 WIB	Edo 22'; Ciro 71'; Dedi (yellow card) 90+3'	Report	Bruno (yellow card) 18'	Stadium: Si Jalak Harupat Stadium; Attendance: 0 Referee: Irfan Wahyu Wijanarko (Yogyakarta)

28 October 2024 9	Persik	0–2	Persib	Kediri, East Java
19:00 WIB	Walian (yellow card) 21'	Report	Dede 48' (o.g.); Tyronne 79'; Kocijan (yellow card) 90+5'	Stadium: Brawijaya Stadium; Attendance: 4,558; Referee: Sance Lawita (North Sulawesi)

1 November 2024 10	Persib	1–1	Semen Padang	Bandung, West Java
19:00 WIB	Ciro 6'; Beckham (yellow card) 54'; Dedi (yellow card) 62'	Report	Djin (yellow card) 48'; Gala 52'; Frendi (yellow card) 50'	Stadium: Si Jalak Harupat Stadium; Attendance: 0 Referee: Rio Permana Putra (Riau)

22 November 2024 11	Persib	1–0	Borneo Samarinda	Bandung, West Java
19:00 WIB	Ciro 36'; Kocijan (yellow card) 53'; Kakang (yellow card) 54'; Kuipers (yellow card) 60'	Report	Peralta (yellow card) 21'; Léo Gaúcho (yellow card) 34'; Furtado (yellow card) 45+1'; Leo Guntara (yellow card) 90+7'	Stadium: Gelora Bandung Lautan Api Stadium; Attendance: 3,980; Referee: Candra (West Sumatra)

9 December 2024 13	PSS	1–2	Persib	Surakarta, Central Java
19:00 WIB	Dumitru 19', (yellow card) 44'; Sitanggang (yellow card) 52'; Betinho (yellow card) 58'	Report	Beckham (yellow card) 15'; da Silva 20'; Tyronne 80'; Irianto (yellow card) 90'	Stadium: Manahan Stadium; Attendance: 6,080; Referee: Muhammad Iqballuddin (Jakarta)

13 December 2024 14	Persib	2–0	Malut United	Bandung, West Java
19:00 WIB	Ciro 53'; da Silva 65'	Report	Baasith (yellow card) 56'	Stadium: Gelora Bandung Lautan Api Stadium; Attendance: 4,824; Referee: Heru Cahyono (Jakarta)

18 December 2024 15	Barito Putera	1–2	Persib	Bantul, Yogyakarta
19:00 WIB	Bayu (yellow card) 28'; França 34' (o.g.); Firly (yellow card) 77'; Nor Halid (red card) 82'	Report	França 11', (yellow card) 41'; Klok 89' (pen.)	Stadium: Sultan Agung Stadium; Attendance: 0 Referee: Muhammad Tri Santoso (Yogyakarta)

22 December 2024 16	Persib	3–1	Persita	Bandung, West Java
19:00 WIB	Beckham 9'; da Silva 38'; Tyronne 51'	Report	Ryuji 16'; Hardianto (yellow card) 65'; Fathoni (red card) 72'	Stadium: Gelora Bandung Lautan Api Stadium; Attendance: 9,465; Referee: Amri Nurhadi (Jambi)

29 December 2024 17	Persis	0–1	Persib	Surakarta, Central Java
19:00 WIB	Aranda (yellow card) 1'; Rizky (yellow card) 18'; Sutanto (yellow card) 90+2' (yellow-red card) 90+3'	Report	Kuipers (yellow card) 38'; Kocijan (yellow card) 45+1'; França (yellow card) 52'; Tyronne 55'; Beckham (yellow card) 81'; Ciro (yellow card) 90+2'	Stadium: Manahan Stadium; Attendance: 4,524; Referee: Steven Yubel Poli (North Sulawesi)

7 January 2025 12	Bali United	1–1	Persib	Gianyar, Bali
20:00 WITA	Novri (yellow card) 4'; Irfan Jaya (yellow card) 25'; Dolah (yellow card) 44'; Mbarga (yellow card) 45+4'; R. Arjuna 47'; Yabes (yellow card) 64' (yellow-red card) 90'; Kadek Agung (yellow card) 72'; Kadek Arel (yellow card) 90+7'	Report	Klok (yellow card) 4'; França (yellow card) 31', (goal) 90+3'; da Silva (yellow card) 62'	Stadium: Kapten I Wayan Dipta; Attendance: 10,085; Referee: Erfan Efendi (East Java)
Note: Match was rescheduled due to Persib's participation in the AFC Champions League Two

11 January 2025 18	PSBS	1–1	Persib	Jayapura, Papua
15:30 WIT	Febrianto (yellow card) 58'; Argañaraz 65'; Marckho (yellow card) 71'; Beltrame (yellow card) 82'	Report	Kuipers (yellow card) 51' (yellow-red card) 52'; Adam Alis (yellow card) 59'; Tyronne 85'; Klok (yellow card) 90+2'	Stadium: Lukas Enembe Stadium; Attendance: 7,561; Referee: Tommi Manggopa (North Sulawesi)

17 January 2025 19	Persib	0–2	Dewa United	Bandung, West Java
19:00 WIB	Kakang (yellow card) 45+2'; França (yellow card) 47'; Robi (yellow card) 75'; Tyronne (yellow card) 87'	Report	Martins 30'; Reva Adi (yellow card) 36'; Alta Ballah (yellow card) 50'; Stevens (yellow card) 78'; Bagaskara 90+3'	Stadium: Gelora Bandung Lautan Api Stadium; Attendance: 15,383; Referee: Candra (West Sumatra)

24 January 2025 20	Arema	1–3	Persib	Blitar, East Java
15:30 WIB	Lokolingoy 45+1'; Thales (yellow card) 64'	Report	Tyronne 33', 67'; Kastaneer 83'; Ryan (yellow card) 90+4'	Stadium: Gelora Supriyadi Stadium; Attendance: 1,164; Referee: Armyn Dwi Suryathin (South Sumatra)

1 February 2025 21	Persib	1–0	PSM	Bandung, West Java
19:00 WIB	Ciro 74', (yellow card) 74'; Kastaneer (yellow card) 90+6'	Report	Victor Luiz (yellow card) 52'	Stadium: Gelora Bandung Lautan Api Stadium; Attendance: 21,359; Referee: Amri Nurhadi (Jambi)

9 February 2025 22	PSIS	0–1	Persib	Semarang, Central Java
19:00 WIB	Faqih (yellow card) 90+5'	Report	Kocijan (yellow card) 25' (yellow-red card) 41'; Kuipers 35'	Stadium: Jatidiri Stadium; Attendance: 126; Referee: Eko Saputra (West Sumatra)

16 February 2025 23	Persija	2–2	Persib	Bekasi, West Java
15:30 WIB	Šimić (yellow card) 17'; Gustavo 33'; Firza 38'; Rizky Ridho (yellow card) 50'; Gajos (yellow card) 61'	Report	Kuipers 51'; da Silva 70'; Klok (yellow card) 77'; Mendoza (yellow card) 84'; França (yellow card) 90'	Stadium: Patriot Chandrabhaga Stadium; Attendance: 27,760; Referee: Muhammad Tri Santoso (Yogyakarta)

22 February 2025 24	Persib	0–0	Madura United	Bandung, West Java
19:00 WIB	Kakang (yellow card) 48'; Henhen (yellow card) 53'	Report	Afrisal (yellow card) 20'; Koko Ari (yellow card) 32'; Iran Júnior (yellow card) 83'	Stadium: Gelora Bandung Lautan Api Stadium; Attendance: 23,339; Referee: Rio Permana Putra (Riau)

1 March 2025 25	Persebaya	4–1	Persib	Surabaya, East Java
20:30 WIB	Tumbas (yellow card) 9'; Toni (yellow card) 31'; Klok 61' (o.g.); Bruno (yellow card) 68', (goal) 82'; Rizky Dwi 79'; Rivera 90+2'	Report	Edo (yellow card) 50'; da Silva (yellow card) 70'; Ryan 89'	Stadium: Gelora Bung Tomo Stadium; Attendance: 24,301; Referee: Candra (West Sumatra)

5 March 2025 26	Persib	4–1	Persik	Bandung, West Java
20:30 WIB	Kuipers (yellow card) 12', (goal) 29'; Ryan (yellow card) 20', (goal) 45+6'; Robi (yellow card) 70'; da Silva 77'; Beckham 90'	Report	Fané (yellow card) 39'; Kiko (yellow card) 45+3' (yellow-red card) 72'; Osman 63' (pen.)	Stadium: Gelora Bandung Lautan Api Stadium; Attendance: 10,304; Referee: Axel Febrian Sinaga (Jakarta)

10 March 2025 27	Semen Padang	1–4	Persib	Padang, West Sumatera
21:00 WIB	Stewart (yellow card) 9'; Gomes 37' (pen.); Gilang (yellow card) 90+6'	Report	Edo (yellow card) 51'; Tyronne 64'; Adam Alis 65'; Beckham 75', 86'; Klok (yellow card) 84'	Stadium: Gelora Haji Agus Salim Stadium; Attendance: 9,650; Referee: Heru Cahyono (Jakarta)

11 April 2025 28	Borneo Samarinda	2–2	Persib	Samarinda, East Kalimantan
20:00 WITA	Rivaldo (yellow card) 6'; Peralta 28', 86', (yellow card) 62'; Nambu (yellow card) 72'; Nduwarugira (yellow card) 90+5'	Report	Kuipers (yellow card) 34'; Tyronne 44' (pen.), 51', (yellow card) 66'; Adam Alis (yellow card) 64'; Ahmad Agung (yellow card) 90+6'	Stadium: Segiri Stadium; Attendance: 9,426; Referee: Muhammad Taqi (Singapore)

18 April 2025 29	Persib	2–1	Bali United	Bandung, West Java
19:00 WIB	Kocijan (yellow card) 32'; Beckham (yellow card) 45+8', (goal) 69'; França (yellow card) 45+8', (goal) 81'; Kastaneer (yellow card) 90+5'	Report	Mbarga (yellow card) 10'; Irfan Jaya 23'; Kadek Arel (yellow card) 45'	Stadium: Gelora Bandung Lautan Api Stadium; Attendance: 24,466; Referee: Candra (West Sumatra)

26 April 2025 30	Persib	3–0	PSS	Bandung, West Java
19:00 WIB	França 20'; Tyronne 49', 56'; Kuipers (yellow card) 71'	Report	Jayus (yellow card) 28'	Stadium: Gelora Bandung Lautan Api Stadium; Attendance: 25,512; Referee: Erfan Efendi (East Java)

2 May 2025 31	Malut United	1–0	Persib	Ternate, North Maluku
21:00 WIT	Wahyu 65'; Frets (yellow card) 90+4'	Report	Klok (yellow card) 50'; Ciro (red card) 73'	Stadium: Gelora Kie Raha Stadium; Attendance: 7,418; Referee: Agung Setiyawan (East Java)

9 May 2025 32	Persib	1–1	Barito Putera	Bandung, West Java
19:00 WIB	Kakang (yellow card) 18'; Kuipers (yellow card) 61'; Edo (yellow card) 77' (yellow-red card) 83'; Henhen (yellow card) 90+3'; Nor Halid 90+7' (o.g.)	Report	Ferdiansyah (yellow card) 20'; Novan (yellow card) 32'; Moreno 45+3'; Aimar (yellow card) 79'; Murilo (yellow card) 90+2'	Stadium: Gelora Bandung Lautan Api Stadium; Attendance: 29,569; Referee: Gedion Dapaherang (Jakarta)

16 May 2025 33	Persita	2–2	Persib	Tangerang, Banten
15:30 WIB	Yardan (yellow card) 34'; Éber Bessa 45+1' (pen.); Ryuji 90+1'	Report	Ryuji 4' (o.g.); Tyronne 47'	Stadium: Indomilk Arena; Attendance: 8,675; Referee: Eko Saputra (West Sumatra)

24 May 2025 34	Persib	3–2	Persis	Bandung, West Java
16:00 WIB	França (yellow card) 19', (goal) 45+2'; Tyronne 57'; da Silva 80'	Report	Zanadin (yellow card) 44'; Belleggia 88' (pen.); Yamamoto 90+1'	Stadium: Gelora Bandung Lautan Api Stadium; Attendance: 28,335; Referee: Rio Permana Putra (Riau)

=== AFC Champions League Two ===
==== Group stage ====
Persib were in Pot 4 of the East Region for the group stage draw which was held on 16 August 2024. They were drawn with Zhejiang, Port, and Lion City Sailors in Group F.

Pos	Team	Pld	W	D	L	GF	GA	GD	Pts	Qualification	LCS	POR	ZHP	PSB
1	(Singapore) Lion City Sailors	6	3	1	2	15	11	+4	10	Advance to round of 16	—	5–2	2–0	2–3
2	(Thailand) Port	6	3	1	2	9	11	−2	10	Advance to round of 16	1–3	—	1–0	2–2
3	(China) Zhejiang	6	3	0	3	10	10	0	9		4–2	1–2	—	1–0
4	(Indonesia) Persib	6	1	2	3	9	11	−2	5		1–1	0–1	3–4	—

Source: AFC
Rules for classification: Tiebreakers

19 September 2024 1	Persib (Indonesia)	0–1	(Thailand) Port	Soreang, Indonesia
19:00 WIB		Report	Sittha (yellow card) 34'; Asnawi (yellow card) 45+2'; Willen 89'	Stadium: Si Jalak Harupat Stadium; Attendance: 4,204; Referee: Ammar Ashkanani (Kuwait)

3 October 2024 2	Zhejiang (China)	1–0	(Indonesia) Persib	Hangzhou, China
20:00 CST	Li (yellow card) 28'; Kouassi 71'	Report	Kakang (yellow card) 61'	Stadium: Huanglong Sports Center; Attendance: 23,931; Referee: Sultan Al-Hammadi (Saudi Arabia)

24 October 2024 3	Persib (Indonesia)	1–1	(Singapore) Lion City Sailors	Soreang, Indonesia
19:00 WIB	Tyronne 43'; Dimas (red card) 51'	Report	Pires (yellow card) 16'; Wright 49'; Datković (yellow card) 77'; Ramselaar (red card) 90+5'	Stadium: Si Jalak Harupat Stadium; Attendance: 2,111; Referee: Bijan Heydari (Iran)

7 November 2024 4	Lion City Sailors (Singapore)	2–3	(Indonesia) Persib	Jalan Besar, Singapore
20:00 SST	Shawal 8', (yellow card) 41'; Hami (yellow card) 11'; Lestienne 23'	Report	Beckham (yellow card) 54'; da Silva 83'; Kocijan 90+3'; Tyronne 90+4'	Stadium: Jalan Besar Stadium; Attendance: 3,152; Referee: Gamini Nivon Robesh (Sri Lanka)

28 November 2024 5	Port (Thailand)	2–2	(Indonesia) Persib	Pathum Thani, Thailand
21:00 ICT	Putros (yellow card) 13'; Doumbouya 18', 31'; Asnawi (yellow card) 67'; Teerasak (yellow card) 90+1'; Suphanan (yellow card) 90+4'	Report	Ciro 17' (pen.); da Silva 90+5'	Stadium: BG Stadium; Attendance: 1,451; Referee: Ammar Mahfoodh (Bahrain)

5 December 2024 6	Persib (Indonesia)	3–4	(China) Zhejiang	Soreang, Indonesia
19:00 WIB	Kuipers (yellow card) 21'; Beckham 31'; Edo (yellow card) 55'; França (yellow card) 61'; da Silva 70'; Tyronne 90+5' (pen.)	Report	Andrijašević 15', 39'; Kouassi 22', 58'; Wang (yellow card) 81'	Stadium: Si Jalak Harupat Stadium; Attendance: 5,707; Referee: Asker Nadjafaliev (Uzbekistan)

== Team statistics ==
=== Appearances and goals ===
No.	Pos.	Player	Liga 1		AFC Champions League Two		Total	
No.	Pos.	Player	Apps.	Goals	Apps.	Goals	Apps.	Goals
1	GK	(Philippines) Kevin Ray Mendoza	27	0	6	0	33	0
2	DF	(Netherlands) Nick Kuipers	29+1	3	6	0	36	3
4	DF	(Brazil) Gustavo França	29+1	5	5	0	35	5
5	DF	(Indonesia) Kakang Rudianto	24+1	0	2+1	0	28	0
6	DF	(Indonesia) Robi Darwis	7+10	0	1+3	0	21	0
7	MF	(Indonesia) Beckham Putra	22+7	3	3+2	1	34	4
8	FW	(Curaçao) Gervane Kastaneer	6+8	2	0	0	14	2
9	FW	(Indonesia) Dimas Drajad	8+6	2	3	0	17	2
10	FW	(Spain) Tyronne del Pino	29+2	18	4+2	3	37	21
11	MF	(Indonesia) Dedi Kusnandar	11+3	0	4+2	0	20	0
12	DF	(Indonesia) Henhen Herdiana	10+11	0	4	0	25	0
13	FW	(Indonesia) Febri Hariyadi	0+4	0	0	0	4	0
14	GK	(Indonesia) Teja Paku Alam	7	0	0	0	7	0
16	DF	(Indonesia) Achmad Jufriyanto	0+3	0	0	0	3	0
17	MF	(Croatia) Mateo Kocijan	19+7	0	5	1	31	1
18	MF	(Indonesia) Adam Alis	19+14	2	3+2	0	38	2
19	FW	(Brazil) David da Silva	13+8	8	0+4	3	25	11
23	MF	(Indonesia) Marc Klok	26+2	1	5+1	0	34	1
27	DF	(Indonesia) Zalnando	3+10	0	0	0	13	0
32	DF	(Indonesia) Victor Igbonefo	2+5	0	0+1	0	8	0
37	DF	(Indonesia) Ferdiansyah Cecep	1+6	0	0	0	7	0
53	MF	(Indonesia) Rachmat Irianto	7+5	0	2+2	0	16	0
56	DF	(Indonesia) Rezaldi Hehanussa	1	0	0	0	1	0
71	MF	(Indonesia) Adzikry Fadlillah	0+4	0	0	0	4	0
77	FW	(Brazil) Ciro Alves	30	6	5+1	1	36	6
88	MF	(Indonesia) Ahmad Agung	0+9	0	0	0	9	0
94	FW	(Cape Verde) Mailson Lima	5+8	0	2+4	0	19	0
96	FW	(Indonesia) Ryan Kurnia	8+18	3	1+2	0	29	3
97	DF	(Indonesia) Edo Febriansah	29+2	1	5	0	36	2
99	GK	(Indonesia) Sheva Sanggasi	0+1	0	0	0	1	0

Source: Competitions

=== Disciplinary record ===
No.	Pos.	Player	Liga 1			AFC Champions League Two			Total		
No.	Pos.	Player	Yellow card	Second yellow card	Red card	Yellow card	Second yellow card	Red card	Yellow card	Second yellow card	Red card
1	GK	(Philippines) Kevin Ray Mendoza	1	0	0	0	0	0	1	0	0
2	DF	(Netherlands) Nick Kuipers	7	1	0	1	0	0	8	1	0
4	DF	(Brazil) Gustavo França	9	0	0	1	0	0	10	0	0
5	DF	(Indonesia) Kakang Rudianto	4	0	0	1	0	0	5	0	0
6	DF	(Indonesia) Robi Darwis	2	0	0	0	0	0	2	0	0
7	MF	(Indonesia) Beckham Putra	5	0	0	1	0	0	6	0	0
8	FW	(Curaçao) Gervane Kastaneer	2	0	0	0	0	0	2	0	0
9	FW	(Indonesia) Dimas Drajad	0	0	0	0	0	1	0	0	1
10	FW	(Spain) Tyronne del Pino	4	0	0	0	0	0	4	0	0
11	MF	(Indonesia) Dedi Kusnandar	3	0	0	0	0	0	3	0	0
12	DF	(Indonesia) Henhen Herdiana	3	0	0	0	0	0	3	0	0
13	FW	(Indonesia) Febri Hariyadi	0	0	0	0	0	0	0	0	0
14	GK	(Indonesia) Teja Paku Alam	0	0	0	0	0	0	0	0	0
16	DF	(Indonesia) Achmad Jufriyanto	0	0	0	0	0	0	0	0	0
17	MF	(Croatia) Mateo Kocijan	6	1	0	0	0	0	6	1	0
18	MF	(Indonesia) Adam Alis	3	0	0	0	0	0	3	0	0
19	FW	(Brazil) David da Silva	2	0	0	0	0	0	2	0	0
23	MF	(Indonesia) Marc Klok	5	0	1	0	0	0	5	0	1
27	DF	(Indonesia) Zalnando	1	0	0	0	0	0	1	0	0
32	DF	(Indonesia) Victor Igbonefo	0	0	0	0	0	0	0	0	0
37	DF	(Indonesia) Ferdiansyah Cecep	0	0	0	0	0	0	0	0	0
53	MF	(Indonesia) Rachmat Irianto	2	0	0	0	0	0	2	0	0
56	DF	(Indonesia) Rezaldi Hehanussa	0	0	0	0	0	0	0	0	0
71	MF	(Indonesia) Adzikry Fadlillah	0	0	0	0	0	0	0	0	0
77	FW	(Brazil) Ciro Alves	2	0	1	0	0	0	2	0	1
88	MF	(Indonesia) Ahmad Agung	1	0	0	0	0	0	1	0	0
94	FW	(Cape Verde) Mailson Lima	0	0	0	0	0	0	0	0	0
96	FW	(Indonesia) Ryan Kurnia	4	0	0	0	0	0	4	0	0
97	DF	(Indonesia) Edo Febriansah	4	1	0	1	0	0	5	1	0
99	GK	(Indonesia) Sheva Sanggasi	0	0	0	0	0	0	0	0	0

Source: Competitions
