= Sapari =

Sapari may refer to:

== People ==
- Dede Sapari (born 2004), Indonesian footballer
- Yaakob Sapari (born 1961), Malaysian politician
- Zainal Sapari (born 1965), Singaporean politician

== Other uses ==
- SAPARi, an online 3D virtual world
- "Sapari", a song by Orphaned Land from The Never Ending Way of ORWarriOR
