= Marek Śledzianowski =

Polish association football player

Personal information
- Full name: Marek Andrzej Śledzianowski
- Place of birth: Poland

Managerial career
- Years: Team
- 2003: Persib Bandung

Marek Śledzianowski (born in Poland) is a Polish retired football manager.
