= Mateo Kocijan =

Croatian footballer

Personal information
- Date of birth: 27 March 1995 (age 31)
- Place of birth: Koprivnica, Croatia
- Height: 1.89 m (6 ft 2 in)
- Positions: Defensive midfielder; centre-back

Team information
- Current team: Radnik Križevci

Senior career*
Years	Team	Apps	(Gls)
–2013	Mladost Sigetec		
2013–2016	Borac Imbriovec		
2016	Mladost Sigetec		
2016–2021	Tehničar 1974		
2021–2023	Slaven Belupo	35	(2)
2023	Partizani Tirana	8	(0)
2024–2025	Persib Bandung	28	(0)
2025	Persis Solo	0	(0)
2025–2026	Tehničar 1974	0	(0)
2026–	Radnik Križevci	0	(0)
- * Club domestic league appearances and goals as of 20 March 2026

Mateo Kocijan (born 27 March 1995) is a Croatian professional footballer who plays as a defensive midfielder or centre-back for Croatian Second League club Radnik Križevci.

== Club career ==
He started his career in the lower division of the Croatian league. In 2021, he officially joined Slaven Belupo, he made his Prva HNL debut on 18 September 2021 in a 1–1 draw against Istra 1961. He scored his first league goal on 17 July 2022 in a 0–1 win against Varaždin.

=== Partizani Tirana ===
He was signed for Albanian club Partizani Tirana and played in Kategoria Superiore in 2023–24 season. Kocijan made his league debut on 9 September 2023 as a substitute in a 1–0 win over Laçi. He contributed with 8 league appearances and 6 appearances in 2023–24 UEFA Europa Conference League qualification, without scoring.

=== Persib Bandung ===
On 3 July 2024, Kocijan decided to Asia and signed a one-year contract with Liga 1 club Persib Bandung. He made his unofficial debut on 19 July 2024 in a pre-season tournament 2024 President's Cup match, during the opening match against PSM Makassar at Si Jalak Harupat Stadium, Bandung.

== Honours ==
Persib Bandung

- Liga 1: 2024–25
