= Bambang Sukowiyono =

Indonesian footballer

Personal information
- Full name: Bambang Sukowiyono
- Date of birth: 7 February 1961
- Place of birth: Surakarta, Indonesia
- Date of death: 1 August 2013 (aged 52)
- Place of death: Bandung, Indonesia
- Height: 1.70 m (5 ft 7 in)
- Position: Midfielder

Senior career*
Years	Team	Apps	(Gls)
1979–1988	Persib Bandung	128	(11)

Managerial career
- 2003: Persib Bandung (Assistant coach)
- * Club domestic league appearances and goals as of 11 July 2012

Bambang Sukowiyono (7 February 1961 – 1 August 2013) is an Indonesian football manager and former footballer.

== Career ==
Wen managed Indonesian side Persib Bandung.
