= Adeng Hudaya =

Indonesian association football player

Personal information
- Date of birth: 30 June 1957 (age 69)
- Place of birth: Indonesia
- Position: Defender

Senior career*
Years	Team	Apps	(Gls)
- Persib Bandung

International career
- Indonesia
- * Club domestic league appearances and goals

Adeng Hudaya (born 30 June 1957) is an Indonesian former footballer who last played as a defender for Persib Bandung.

== Early life ==
Hudaya is a native of Cikajang, Indonesia.

== Career ==
Hudaya started his career with Indonesian side Persib Bandung. He never scored a competitive goal during his career.

== Style of play ==
Hudaya mainly operated as a defensive player.
