= Nandar Iskandar =

Indonesian football manager (born 1950)

Personal information
- Date of birth: 3 June 1950 (age 76)
- Place of birth: Indonesia

Senior career*
| Years | Team | Apps | (Gls) |
- Persib Bandung

Managerial career
- Persib Bandung
- 1999–2000: Indonesia
- 2000–2001: Bontang FC
- 2001–2002: Perseden Denpasar
- 2002–2003: PSPS Pekanbaru
- 2007–2011: Persiba Bantul
- 2011: Bandung FC
- * Club domestic league appearances and goals

Nandar Iskandar (born 3 June 1950) is an Indonesian former football manager and player.

== Playing career ==
Iskandar played for Indonesian side Persib Bandung.

== Managerial career ==
Iskandar managed Indonesian side Persib Bandung.
