= Risnandar Soendoro =

Indonesian footballer and coach

Personal information
- Full name: Risnandar Soendoro
- Date of birth: 31 January 1948
- Place of birth: Bandung, Indonesia
- Date of death: 3 March 2016 (aged 68)
- Place of death: Bandung, Indonesia
- Position: Defender

Youth career
- 1966–1968: UNI Bandung

Senior career*
Years	Team	Apps	(Gls)
1968–1978	Persib Bandung		

International career
1970–1978	Indonesia		

Managerial career
- 1980–1983: Persib Bandung
- ????: PSGC Ciamis
- ????: Persiba Balikpapan
- 1987–1989: Bandung Raya
- 1995–1996: Persib Bandung
- 1999–2000: Persikab Bandung
- 2005–2006: Persib Bandung
- * Club domestic league appearances and goals

Risnandar Soendoro (31 January 1948 – 3 March 2016) was an Indonesian football player and coach. He was best known for his time in Persib Bandung where he spent ten years in the senior squad and three coaching stints. Nicknamed the "Asian Franz Beckenbauer", his skills as a player drew praise from his colleagues. He also had stints coaching Bandung Raya, PSGC Ciamis, Persikab Bandung, and Persiba Balikpapan.

== Early life ==
Soendoro was born on 31 January 1948 in Bandung. He was the 11th child of 14 siblings. His father R. Soendoro was a footballer who once played for VIJ Jakarta and would become chairman of Persib Bandung in 1950. Soendoro started playing football in the garden in front of his house located in the Jalan Malabar, Bandung. In this park, the Soendoro family often played against their opponents. Four of his brothers would also become Persib players, they were Soenarto, Soenaryono, Giantoro, and Hari.

== Club career ==
=== UNI Bandung ===
Soendoro started his footballing career by playing for UNI Bandung, a member and feeder club of Persib Bandung, in 1966.

=== Persib Bandung ===
At the age of 20, Soendoro was promoted to Persib's senior squad in 1968. In the 1973 Perserikatan, despite Persib's poor performance, Soendoro won the competition's best player award. In the 1978 Perserikatan, Persib were relegated after losing their fifth-place play-off to Persiraja Banda Aceh. At the end of the season, aged 30, Soendoro retired.

== International career ==
Soendoro was first called up to the Indonesia national team in 1970.

== Coaching career ==
=== Persib Bandung ===
Shortly after retiring from the playing field, Soendoro became Persib head coach with the task of getting the club promoted back to the Perserikatan Premier Division. Their first season in the First Division, Persib failed to progress through the second stage. In the following season, Persib finally gained promotion after winning third-place in the 1983 First Division. Despite this, ahead of the 1983 Premier Division, Persib decided to replace Soendoro with Omo Suratmo.

=== Bandung Raya ===
In 1987, Soendoro became a part of Bandung Raya, a new Bandung-based Galatama club formed UNI Bandung players and staff. In its first season, the club finish bottom of the league.

=== Second Persib stint ===
In 1995, Soendoro was appointed Persib head coach once more to replace the outgoing Indra Thohir. In the 1995–96 Liga Indonesia Premier Division managed to finish third in the West Division only to be eliminated in the second stage.

=== Persikab Bandung ===
In 1999, Soendoro became head coach of Persib's neighbours, Persikab Bandung. On 11 November 1999, he led Persikab to a 1–0 win over Persib in the Bandung derby.

=== Last stint with Persib ===
On 16 October 2005, Soendoro was appointed as Persib head coach once more for the 2006 Premier Division However, a poor start to the 2006 season saw his reign end very early.

== Personal life ==
Soendoro was married and had five children. After retiring from coaching, he continues to run the UNI footballing school

== Death ==
On 3 March 2016, Soendoro died in a hospital in Bandung due to a chronic stomach ulcer. He was buried in TPU Nagrog.

== Honours ==
=== Player ===
==== Individual ====
- Perserikatan Best Player: 1973

=== Coach ===
==== Persib Bandung ====
- Perserikatan First Division third place: 1983
