= Ryan Kurnia =

Indonesian footballer (born 1996)

Personal information
- Full name: Ryan Kurnia
- Date of birth: 28 June 1996 (age 30)
- Place of birth: Bogor, Indonesia
- Height: 1.80 m (5 ft 11 in)
- Position: Winger

Team information
- Current team: Bhayangkara Presisi
- Number: 96

Youth career
- SSB Gelora Muda
- SSB Cikeas

Senior career*
Years	Team	Apps	(Gls)
2015–2017	Persikabo Bogor	8	(1)
2017	PSGC Ciamis	10	(2)
2018	Martapura	13	(1)
2018	Persita Tangerang	9	(4)
2019	TIRA-Persikabo	4	(0)
2020–2021	Sulut United	10	(0)
2022	Arema	14	(0)
2022–2023	Persikabo 1973	30	(4)
2023–2025	Persib Bandung	49	(4)
2025–	Bhayangkara Presisi	16	(1)
- * Club domestic league appearances and goals as of 23 May 2026

Ryan Kurnia (born 28 June 1996) is an Indonesian professional footballer who plays as a winger for Super League club Bhayangkara Presisi.

== Early life ==
Ryan was born in Bogor Regency, West Java. He is a native of Wanaherang in the district of Gunung Putri of the regency.

== Club career ==
=== TIRA-Persikabo ===
Ryan was signed for TIRA-Persikabo to play in Liga 1 in the 2019 season. He made his league debut on 18 May 2019 as a substitute in a match against Badak Lampung at the Pakansari Stadium, Cibinong.

=== Sulut United ===
He was signed for Sulut United to play in Liga 2 in the 2020 season. This season was suspended on 27 March 2020 due to the COVID-19 pandemic. The season was abandoned and declared void on 20 January 2021.

=== Arema ===
Ryan was signed by Arema to play in Liga 1 in the 2021–22 season. He made his league debut on 13 January 2022 as a substitute in a 2–0 match against PSS Sleman at Kapten I Wayan Dipta Stadium.

=== Persikabo 1973 ===
In May 2022, Liga 1 club Persikabo 1973 announced that Kurnia would be join the club for 2022–23 season. He made his league debut on 31 July 2022 in a match against Dewa United at the Indomilk Arena, Tangerang. On 3 September 2022, Kurnia made his first goal for the club in Liga 1, earning them a 3–2 win over Borneo Samarinda. He played the full 90 minutes in a 2–0 win against PSS Sleman on 15 September. On 9 December 2022, Kurnia give one assists to Bruno Dybal in Persikabo's 1–1 draw over RANS Nusantara. He scored his league goal for the club, opening the scoring in a 1–1 draw against PS Barito Putera on 17 December.

=== Persib Bandung ===
Kurnia was signed for Persib Bandung to play in Liga 1 in the 2023–24 season. He made his debut on 2 July 2023 in a match against Madura United at the Gelora Bandung Lautan Api Stadium, Bandung. He scored his first goal for Persib Bandung against Persik Kediri on 28 July 2023. On 9 June 2025, Kurnia officially left Persib Bandung.

=== Bhayangkara Presisi ===
On 19 June 2025, Kurnia officially signed Bhayangkara Presisi.

== International career ==
On 29 August 2023, Ryan received a call-up to the Indonesia national team for a friendly match against Turkmenistan at the Gelora Bung Tomo Stadium, Surabaya.

== Honours ==
Persib Bandung

- Liga 1: 2023–24, 2024–25

Individual

- Super League Assist of the Month: November 2025
