= Igor Tolić =

Bosnian football manager (born 1977)

Personal information
- Full name: Igor Tolić
- Date of birth: 25 September 1977 (age 49)
- Place of birth: Gradačac, SFR Yugoslavia
- Position: Defender

Team information
- Current team: Persib Bandung (head coach)

Senior career*
Years	Team	Apps	(Gls)
2011–2013	NK HAŠK		

Managerial career
- 2019: Hajduk Split U19
- 2019–2021: Osijek II
- 2021: Kustošija
- 2022–2024: Wadi Degla
- 2024–2026: Persib Bandung (assistant)
- 2026–: Persib Bandung
- * Club domestic league appearances and goals

Igor Tolić (born 25 September 1977) is a Bosnian-born Croatian football manager and former professional player. During his playing career, he played as a defender in the Croatian domestic football system before retiring at NK HAŠK in 2013.He is currently the head coach of the Indonesia Super League club, Persib Bandung.

== Managerial career ==
Tolić began his coaching career managing various youth and senior development teams. He served as the manager for the Hajduk Split U19 squad in 2019, before taking charge of Osijek II from 2019 until 2021. Following a brief stint with Kustošija in late 2021, he moved abroad to manage the Egyptian side Wadi Degla between 2022 and 2024.

In July 2024, Tolić moved to Indonesian football to join Persib Bandung as an assistant coach under Bojan Hodak. He was subsequently appointed as the head coach of Persib Bandung on 26 May 2026, succeeding Hodak. In August 2026, he prepared the squad for their crucial single-match playoff tie in the AFC Champions League Two against Manila Digger.

== Managerial statistics ==
As of match played 22 November 2026

Managerial record by team and tenure
Team	Nat.	From	To	Record					Ref.
Team	Nat.	From	To	G	W	D	L	Win %	Ref.
Osijek II	(Croatia)	17 July 2019	30 June 2021	53	18	14	21	33.96	
Kustošija	(Croatia)	1 July 2021	17 October 2021	9	0	5	4	0.00	
Wadi Degla	(Egypt)	21 February 2022	11 May 2024	69	32	21	16	46.38	
Persib Bandung	(Indonesia)	26 May 2026	Present	17	13	1	3	76.47	
Career Total				148	63	41	44	42.57	

== Honours ==
Persib Bandung (as manager)

- Piala Presiden runner-up: 2026

Persib Bandung (as assistant manager)

- Liga 1/Super League: 2023–24, 2024–25, 2025–26
