= Indra Thohir =

Indonesian football coach

Personal information
- Full name: Indra Mohammad Thohir
- Date of birth: 7 July 1941 (age 85)
- Place of birth: Bandung, Dutch East Indies

Managerial career
- Years: Team
- 1989–1990: Indonesia U16
- 1993–1995: Persib Bandung
- 1996–1997: Persikabo Bogor
- 2000–2001: Persib Bandung
- 2005: Persib Bandung
- 2016: PON Bangka Belitung

Indra Mohammad Thohir (born 7 July 1941) is an Indonesian former football coach who is best known for guiding Persib Bandung to two consecutive national titles, the 1993–94 Perserikatan and 1994–95 Liga Indonesia Premier Division. He is considered one of Persib's greatest coaches of all time. Aside from Persib, he has also coached Persikabo Bogor and the Indonesia national under-16 football team.

== Early life ==
Indra Thohir was born in the Cigereleng area of Bandung on 7 July 1941, the son of Asik and Omas. He completed his elementary and junior high school in Bandung, then continued his studies in the Academy of Physical Education, which was under the jurisdiction of the University of Indonesia. After graduating, he became a lecturer for his alma mater, which would eventually become the Indonesian University of Education's Faculty of Sports and Health Education (FPOK UPI).

== Coaching career ==
=== Early years ===
Aside from being a lecturer for UPI, Thohir also coached the university's football team. Under his guidance, the team reached the national finals twice. They also represented Indonesia in the ASEAN University Games twice, in 1981 and 1982. In 1984, Thohir was hired by Persib Bandung to become the club's new fitness coach. As a member of the coaching staff, Thohir became part of the club's Perserikatan triumph in 1986.

=== Indonesia national under-16 team ===
In 1989, Thohir was called by PSSI to become head coach of the Indonesia national under-16 team in preparation for the 1990 AFC U-16 Championship held in the United Arab Emirates. Draws with South Korea and Qatar were enough to see the team progress as runners-up of Group B. The team went on to finish in fourth place after losing their semifinal to the hosts and the third place match 0–5 to China, just missing out on qualification for the 1991 FIFA U-17 World Championship.

=== Persib Bandung ===
Thohir returned to Persib following the AFC U-16 Championship as assistant coach, during which he witnessed the club win another Perserikatan title in 1990. In 1993, Thohir was appointed as Persib Bandung's new head coach to guide through the last edition of Perserikatan. To do so, Thohir had the likes of Roy Darwis, Robby Darwis, Yusuf Bachtiar, Yudi Guntara, Asep Sumantri, and Dede Iskandar in his squad. Under his coaching, Persib won the title after beating PSM 2–0 in the final on 17 April 1994.

Ahead of the inaugural season of the Liga Indonesia Premier Division, Thohir was again trusted as the head coach by Persib. Despite being allowed to sign foreign players, the club kept trust on its local players. Persib started the competition with a loss, losing 1–0 to Pelita Jaya with the only goal scored by Yugoslav striker Dejan Gluščević. As the season went on, Persib advanced to the second stage as runners-up of the West Division. In the second stage, Persib started with a goalless draw with Petrokimia Putra before wins against Medan Jaya and Assyabaab SGS saw Persib through to the semifinals as Group B winners. They would win their semifinal match against Barito Putera with the only goal scored by Kekey Zakaria. In the final, the club had another meeting with Petrokimia Putra. With the Bobotoh supporting them, Persib won the title with a goal from Sutiono Lamso in the 76th minute. It was a proud moment for Thohir as he managed to win two titles in a row with local talents.

As champions of the Premier Division, Persib gained entry to the 1995 Asian Club Championship. They managed to reach the quarterfinals after beating Bangkok Bank and Pasay. Their campaign ended when they failed to qualify out of their quarterfinal group, finishing last behind Ilhwa Chunwa, Thai Farmers Bank, and Júbilo Iwata. Along the way, Thohir was named AFC Coach of the Month for September 1995. At the end of Persib's Asian campaign, Thohir resigned as head coach. He would spend a year teaching at SKO Ragunan, a sports school in Jakarta.

=== Persikabo Bogor ===
In 1996, Thohir became head coach of First Division side Persikabo Bogor. During his tenure, the club managed to gain promotion to the Premier Division after winning the third place match against Perseden 4–0 on 24 July 1997.

=== Return to Persib ===
In early 2000, Persib hired Thohir back as head coach to steer the club away from relegation trouble. Under Thohir, Persib's results slowly began to climb. Nevertheless, throughout the competition, fears of relegation kept haunting Persib. The team only secured safety in the last four matches by taking 10 points out of a possible 12, securing their place in next season's Premier Division. For steering the club to safety, Thohir was retained as the club's head coach.

For the 2001 season, Thohir strengthened his squad with new arrivals such as Abdus Shobur, Luis Simoes, and Nana Setia. He also signed Yusuf Bachtiar back to the club. Despite doubts from his own supporters, Thohir managed to bring Persib back to the second stage. In the second stage, Persib were in Group A with PSMS, Persebaya, and Barito Putera. They started the second stage with a 2–1 win over Barito Putera. However, defeat to PSMS in their following match left them with a must-win match against Persebaya. In a fierce match, the teams were not able to score within 90 minutes, leading the match to extra time due to Persib and Persebaya being level points and goal differential. Persib campaign came to an end when Reinald Pieters found the net for Persebaya in the 115th minute to seal the match. At the end of the season, Thohir left the club once again.

=== Second Persib return ===
In 2005, Persib once again called Thohir back to his head coach role amidst disappointment with his predecessor Juan Páez's performance. The club would have a slow start to the season but they slowly improved their form. Hopes of reaching the second stage came to end in the closing phase of the season, with a 1–1 draw with PSMS, a 1–0 defeat to Arema, and a loss to Persija sealing their fate. Thohir left his role and retired from coaching with his position being filled by Risnandar Soendoro on 16 October 2005.

=== PON Bangka Belitung ===
In 2016, Thohir made a brief return to coaching as he took charge of the Bangka Belitung football team for the 2016 Pekan Olahraga Nasional held in Bandung. The team would progress to the second round as the best third-placed team in the first round.

== Style of coaching ==
As a coach, Thohir is known to have great authority among players. In training, Thohir does not privilege star players and is against favoritism. As a consequence of his seriousness in carrying out his responsibilities as a coach, Thohir could not leave training. In tactics, Thohir overhauled Persib's formation from 4–3–3 to 3–5–2. It was the first time that the 3–5–2 was introduced to Indonesian football. "At first it was an obstacle. But, it was just a matter of habit," said Thohir, quoted from the book Persib Juara by Endan Suhendra.

== Personal life ==
Thohir is married to Aat Ratnawati, with whom he has two sons and a daughter. According to his wife, Thohir's hobbies include singing, dancing, and playing golf. He said in an interview that his golf skills were pretty good for an amateur. After retiring, he founded a golf club named Golf Spirit Club with his friends. Although he no longer runs the club, Thohir still makes frequent visits. He also continued lecturing in UPI and several other state universities in West Java.

On 8 March 2015, Thohir was hospitalized after having a low level of platelets in his blood due to a virus.

== Honours ==
=== Persib Bandung ===
- Perserikatan: 1993–94
- Liga Indonesia Premier Division: 1994–95

=== Persikabo Bogor ===
- Liga Indonesia First Division third place: 1996–97

=== Individual ===
- AFC Coach of the Month: September 1995
- Persib Reporters Forum's Lifetime Achievement Award: 2020
