= Gustavo França (footballer, born 1996) =

Brazilian footballer

Personal information
- Full name: Gustavo Moreno de França
- Date of birth: 20 July 1996 (age 30)
- Place of birth: Minas Gerais, Brazil
- Height: 1.88 m (6 ft 2 in)
- Position: Centre-back

Team information
- Current team: Java United
- Number: 4

Senior career*
Years	Team	Apps	(Gls)
2020–2021	Tupynambás	11	(0)
2021	Nacional	0	(0)
2021–2022	Leixões	20	(0)
2022–2023	Sabail	26	(0)
2023–2024	Vilaverdense	12	(0)
2024	Tondela	8	(0)
2024–2025	Persib Bandung	30	(6)
2025–	Java United	31	(5)
- * Club domestic league appearances and goals as of 19 September 2026

Gustavo Moreno de França (born 20 July 1996), is a Brazilian professional footballer who plays as a centre-back for Super League club Java United.

== Club career ==
Born in Minas Gerais, Brazil, Gustavo started off senior career in the Brazilian club Tupynambás in 2020 and Nacional (SP) in 2021. He decided to go abroad for the first time to Portugal with joined Leixões.

Ahead of 2022–23 season, Gustavo signed for Azerbaijan Premier League club Sabail. He made his debut for Sabail on 6 August 2022, in 3–1 away lose over Qarabağ. After one season in Azerbaijan, he returned to Portugal to join Vilaverdense. Then, he joined Tondela. During his career with Tondela, he made 8 appearances in 2023–24 season.

=== Persib Bandung ===
On 10 July 2024, Liga 1 club Persib Bandung signed Gustavo from Tondela. Gustavo chose 4 as his squad number. On 22 July 2024, Gustavo made his debut for Persib in pre-season 2024 Piala Presiden in a 0–1 lose against Borneo Samarinda. Subsequently on 9 August 2024, Gustavo made his Liga 1 debut for Persib Bandung in a home match against PSBS Biak in a 4–1 win, he was starter and playing full 90 minutes. On 15 September 2024, he scored his first goal for Persib in the 40th minute of a 2–1 home win against PSIS Semarang. Two days later, Gustavo started and played the whole 90 minutes in the opening 2024–25 AFC Champions League Two group stage, with Persib losing 1–0 to Thai club Port. On 18 December 2024, he scored the opening goal in a 1–2 away win over Barito Putera at Sultan Agung Stadium.

On 7 January 2025, Gustavo scored equalizer in the 90+3 minute of a 1–1 draw against Bali United. On 18 April 2025, Gustavo scored the winning goal for Persib Bandung in a 2–1 home win against Bali United.

== Honours ==
=== Club ===
Persib Bandung

- Liga 1: 2024–25

Individual

- Liga 1 Team of the Season: 2024–25
