= Bojan Hodak =

Croatian football manager (born 1971)

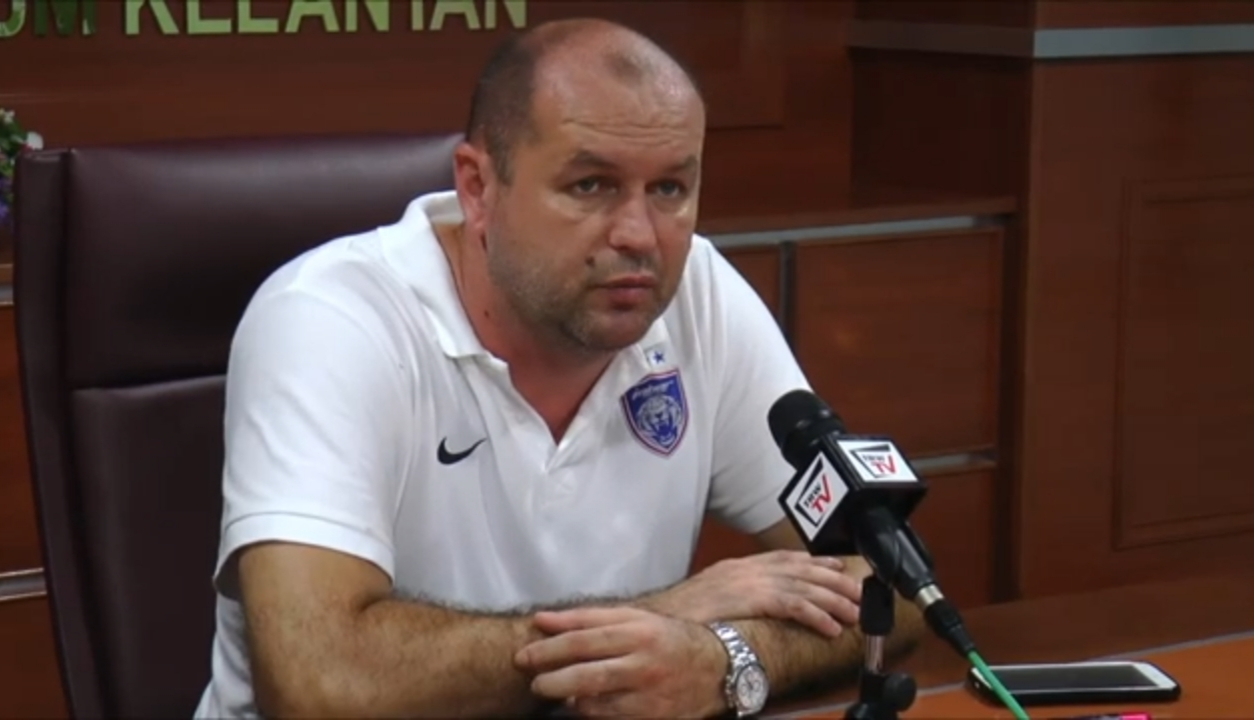

Personal information
- Full name: Bojan Hodak
- Date of birth: 4 May 1971 (age 55)
- Place of birth: Zagreb, SR Croatia, SFR Yugoslavia
- Position: Centre-back

Youth career
- 1984–1990: Trnje

Senior career*
Years	Team	Apps	(Gls)
1990–1994	Vrapče		
1995	Hrvatski Dragovoljac		
1996	Ponikve		
1997	Balestier Central		
1998–1999	Jurong		
1999	Hong Kong Rangers		
2000–2001	Jurong		
2002	Trnje		

Managerial career
- 2006–2009: UPB-MyTeam
- 2010–2011: Phnom Penh Crown
- 2012–2013: Kelantan
- 2014–2015: Johor Darul Ta'zim
- 2017–2019: Malaysia U19
- 2020: PSM Makassar
- 2021–2023: Kuala Lumpur City
- 2023–2026: Persib Bandung
- * Club domestic league appearances and goals

Bojan Hodak (born 4 May 1971) is a Croatian professional football coach and former player who was most recently the technical advisor of Super League club Persib Bandung.

== Early life ==
Hodak was born and raised in Zagreb as the second child in a family with a strong military background. His father and brother were both army officers. In his early years, he spent most time playing basketball and football, not preferring one over the other as he excelled in both. There was neither a prominent figure that encouraged him, nor was there any history of sportsmen in his family, but Hodak carried on for fun, joining his friends. However at the age of 16, his local club NK Trnje began paying him for his services and he duly gave up basketball to focus his time and energy in football.

== Managerial career ==
=== UPB-MyTeam ===
Hodak's coaching career began in Malaysia in 2006 with the now-defunct UPB-MyTeam, where he guided them to promotion into the Malaysian Super League. There he was responsible for the development of UPB-MyTeam's very young squad, which produced many Malaysian national players, including Norshahrul Idlan Talaha, Shakir Shaari, Bunyamin Umar, Syed Adney Syed Hussein, Stanley Samuel, Azmi Muslim, Nazrin Nawi and Azamuddin Akil.

=== Phnom Penh Crown ===
With Phnom Penh Crown, he won the Cambodian League and qualified for the AFC President's Cup Final Round for the first time in Cambodian football history.

=== Shandong Taishan ===
With Shandong Taishan, he won the Reserve CSL and he was assistant coach in the First team that lost the Chinese FA Cup final 2–1 to Tianjin Teda.

=== Kelantan ===
Hodak was appointed manager and head coach of Kelantan in February 2012. He made Kelantan history during his debut season, guiding them to a historic treble of the Malaysian FA Cup, Malaysian Super League and Malaysia Cup. The team also qualified for the 2012 AFC Cup quarter-finals where they lost to Arbil FC of Iraq, 3–6 on aggregate. In his second season with Kelantan, despite losing six key players, the team managed to retain the FA Cup, but lost the league championship to LionsXII and Malaysia Cup final to Sri Pahang. He left the team after the conclusion of the 2013 season.

=== Johor Darul Takzim ===
With Johor Darul Ta'zim, he won the 2014 Malaysia Super League and qualified for the AFC Cup. The team collected 44 points from 22 matches and beat Sarawak 1–0 at Stadium Negeri Sarawak, Kuching. In January 2015, he guided JDT to the Charity Shield after JDT beat Pahang 2–0.

=== Penang ===
Hodak was appointed CEO of Penang in May 2016 with the target to save Penang from relegation. Penang were bottom of the Malaysian Super League with only 6 points from 11 matches. He signed Nenad Baćina as head coach, changed three players and the team started improving. In the second half of the season, Penang was one of the best teams, winning 16 points, with only Johor Darul Ta'zim and Kedah Darul Aman winning more points in these 11 matches.

The team managed to stay in Malaysian Super League in 2016. After Hodak left at the end of the 2016 season, Penang was relegated the next season, after collecting only 12 points From 22 matches.

=== Malaysia U19 National Team ===
With Malaysia U-19, Hodak achieved best results in the history by winning AFF U-19 Championship in 2018. Before that, in 2017 he was runner Up in same age group and manage to qualify for AFC U-19 Championship 2017.

=== PSM Makassar ===
On the last day of 2019 (31 December 2019), PSM Makassar officially announced Bojan Hodak as their new coach for the upcoming 2020 season.

=== Kuala Lumpur City ===
Bojan helped the City Boys reached their first cup final after 22 years (since 1999 Malaysia FA Cup).

On top of that, Kuala Lumpur City put an end to the 32-year drought of Malaysia Cup (last won in 1989) by winning the 2021 Malaysia Cup final by beating the overwhelming favourites JDT 2–0 at the Bukit Jalil National Stadium.

As title holders of the Malaysia Cup, Kuala Lumpur City qualified to play in the 2022 AFC Cup campaign via cup competition after Malaysia FA Cup was abandoned due to COVID-19 pandemic. Bojan led the team to the final, where they have to finish as the runner-up after losing 0–2 to Omani club Al-Seeb.

Bojan's last match for the team was the final of the 2023 Malaysia FA Cup against Johor Darul Ta'zim which ended in their loss of 0–2. On 26 July 2023, four days after the match, Bojan announced his resignation.

=== Persib Bandung ===
In the same day of Bojan's resignation announcement from Kuala Lumpur City, Persib Bandung introduced him as the new head coach to replace Luis Milla. At the moment of his arrival, Maung Bandung was struggling in their 2023–24 Liga 1 campaign. They were down in the relegation zone, positioned 16th out of 18 teams.

Under Bojan, Persib had managed to breach out of the bottom and managed to qualify for the championship series after finishing second in the regular series standings.

Persib was finally able to emerge as champions after winning 6–1 in aggregate against Madura United in the finals. Bojan made club history as the first foreign head coach to win a league title. In addition, he was awarded as the season's Best Coach.

Bojan made another history in the 2024–25 season as he led Persib to a back-to-back championship. The team sealed the title in Matchday 31 after both contenders Dewa United and Persebaya Surabaya failed to secure a win in their fixtures, leaving them ten points behind Persib with only three matches left to be played. This achievement had placed Bojan in par with Indra Thohir as the only other Persib head coach to win consecutive league titles by winning the 1993–94 Perserikatan and the 1994–95 Liga Indonesia.

In the 2025–26 season, Bojan made yet another record as he led Persib to a championship title for a third time in a row. The team sealed the title in Matchday 34, the final matchday of the season, after Persib secured a draw against Persijap Jepara. That draw allowed Persib to be champions as they were the better in head-to-head comparisons against Borneo Samarinda even though the latter won 7–1 and even managed to reach the same amount of points as the former. For his achievements, he was bestowed the title of Best Coach.

On 25 May 2026, Hodak decided to stepped down as the head coach and switch to a new role as the club's technical advisor. He was replaced by his assistant, Igor Tolic.

== Managerial statistics ==
As of 25 May 2026

Managerial record by team and tenure
Team	Nat.	From	To	Record					Ref.
Team	Nat.	From	To	G	W	D	L	Win %	Ref.
UPB-MyTeam	(Malaysia)	1 November 2006	21 June 2009	81	37	15	29	45.68	
Phnom Penh Crown	(Cambodia)	1 October 2010	31 May 2011	14	10	3	1	71.43	
Kelantan	(Malaysia)	27 February 2012	31 December 2013	90	53	21	16	58.89	
Johor Darul Ta'zim	(Malaysia)	26 February 2014	1 May 2015	38	23	9	6	60.53	
Malaysia U19	(Malaysia)	1 August 2017	31 July 2019	17	11	4	2	64.71	
PSM Makassar	(Indonesia)	1 January 2020	1 April 2020	8	4	3	1	50.00	
Kuala Lumpur City	(Malaysia)	7 January 2021	26 July 2023	90	37	29	24	41.11	
Persib Bandung	(Indonesia)	26 July 2023	25 May 2026	119	69	34	16	57.98	
Career Total				457	244	118	95	53.39	

== Honours ==
UPB MyTeam

- Malaysia Premier League runner-up: 2007

Phnom Penh Crown

- Cambodian League: 2011

Kelantan

- Malaysia Super League: 2012
- Malaysia FA Cup: 2012, 2013
- Malaysia Cup: 2012; runner-up: 2013
- Malaysia Charity Shield runner-up: 2013

Johor Darul Ta'zim

- Malaysia Super League: 2014
- Malaysia Charity Shield: 2015
- Malaysia Cup runner-up: 2014

Malaysia U19

- AFF U-19 Youth Championship: 2018; runner-up: 2017

Kuala Lumpur City

- Malaysia Cup: 2021
- AFC Cup runner-up: 2022
- Malaysia FA Cup runner-up: 2023

Persib Bandung

- Super League: 2023–24, 2024–25, 2025–26

Individual

- Malaysia Super League 2021 Best Coach Award
- Super League Coach of the Month: October 2023, October/November 2024, December 2024, December 2025, February 2026
- Super League Best Coach: 2023–24, 2024–25, 2025–26
