= Tyronne del Pino =

Spanish footballer

Tyronne
Personal information
- Full name: Tyronne Gustavo del Pino Ramos
- Date of birth: 27 January 1991 (age 35)
- Place of birth: Las Palmas, Spain
- Height: 1.82 m (6 ft 0 in)
- Positions: Attacking midfielder; winger

Team information
- Current team: Persita Tangerang
- Number: 77

Youth career
- Las Palmas

Senior career*
Years	Team	Apps	(Gls)
2010–2014	Las Palmas B	66	(12)
2010–2017	Las Palmas	8	(0)
2013	→ Barakaldo (loan)	14	(1)
2014–2016	→ Huesca (loan)	65	(16)
2017	→ Tenerife (loan)	16	(1)
2017–2019	Tenerife	37	(1)
2019–2020	Lamia	17	(0)
2021–2022	Lamia	40	(1)
2022	Nakhon Ratchasima	27	(7)
2023–2025	Persib Bandung	32	(18)
2024	→ Ratchaburi (loan)	15	(5)
2025–2026	Malut United	32	(10)
2026–	Persita Tangerang	6	(1)
- * Club domestic league appearances and goals as of 31 October 2026

Tyronne Gustavo del Pino Ramos (born 27 January 1991), simply known as Tyronne, is a Spanish professional footballer who plays as an attacking midfielder or winger for Super League club Persita Tangerang.

== Club career ==
Born in Las Palmas, Canary Islands, Tyronne graduated from UD Las Palmas' youth academy, and made his senior debut with their reserves in the 2010–11 season, in the Tercera División. On 11 December 2010, he appeared in his first match as a professional with the former, playing the last 12 minutes in a 0–3 Segunda División home loss against Xerez CD.

On 31 January 2013, Tyronne was loaned to Barakaldo CF of Segunda División B. He returned in June, and was definitely promoted to the main squad in July of the following year, but moved on loan to fellow third-division club SD Huesca on 1 September 2014. He scored 12 goals in his debut campaign, including two in both legs of the play-off final which granted his team promotion.

Tyronne signed a new three-year contract with Las Palmas on 21 July 2015, and immediately returned to Huesca in a one-year loan deal. He scored his first goal in division two on 20 September, but in a 1–3 home loss against Elche CF.

In July 2016, after returning from loan, Tyronne was granted a place in the first team by manager Quique Setién. He made his debut in La Liga on 28 August of that year, replacing scorer Nabil El Zhar in a 5–1 home rout of Granada CF.

On 21 January 2017, Tyronne was loaned to neighbouring second-tier club CD Tenerife until the end of the season. On 15 July he cut ties with Las Palmas, and agreed to a permanent three-year deal with Tenerife just hours later.

Tyronne subsequently competed abroad, with PAS Lamia 1964 in the Super League Greece and Nakhon Ratchasima F.C. in the Thai League 1. In 2023, he moved to the Indonesian Liga 1 with Persib Bandung, winning the national championship in 2024–25 while being voted the competition's Most Valuable Player, scoring 21 goals in all competitions; he suffered a serious injury shortly after arriving, being loaned to Thai side Ratchaburi F.C. during this timeframe.

== Honours ==
Persib Bandung

- Liga 1: 2024–25

Individual

- Liga 1 Best Player: 2024–25
- Liga 1 Team of the Season: 2024–25
- Professional Footballers Association of Indonesia Best Footballer: 2024–25
- Professional Footballers Association of Indonesia Best Midfielder: 2024–25
- Professional Footballers Association of Indonesia Best 11: 2024–25
- Professional Footballers Association of Indonesia Fan Favourite Award: 2024–25
- Super League Player of the Month: January 2026
