= Dede Sapari =

Indonesian footballer (born 2004)

Personal information
- Full name: Dede Sapari
- Date of birth: 8 April 2004 (age 22)
- Place of birth: Sumedang, Indonesia
- Height: 1.76 m (5 ft 9 in)
- Position: Left-back

Team information
- Current team: Madura United (on loan from PSIM Yogyakarta)
- Number: 29

Youth career
- 2017: Persib Academy Cimahi
- 2018–2019: Persib U16
- 2020–2021: Bhayangkara U18
- 2022: Persib U20

Senior career*
Years	Team	Apps	(Gls)
2023–2024	Persela Lamongan	14	(0)
2024–2025	Persik Kediri	20	(0)
2025–	PSIM Yogyakarta	8	(0)
2026–	→ Madura United (loan)	0	(0)
- * Club domestic league appearances and goals as of 10 January 2026 (UTC)

Dede Sapari (born 8 April 2004) is an Indonesian professional footballer who plays as a left-back for Super League club Madura United, on loan from PSIM Yogyakarta.

== Club career ==
Born in Sumedang, West Java, Indonesia, Sapari started his early career by playing for the Persib Academy Cimahi and Persib U16, a season later he moved to Bhayangkara U18. A year later, he returned to Persib, becoming part of Persib U20 that competed in the Elite Pro Academy.

=== Persela Lamongan ===
He was signed for Persela Lamongan to play in Liga 2 in the 2023–24 season. Sapari made his first-team debut on 16 September 2023 in a 0–1 win against PSCS Cilacap at the Wijayakusuma Stadium, Cilacap. He had a good season in this first season with statistics of 1,130 minutes played in 14 matches in 2023–24 Liga 2.

=== Persik Kediri ===
In July 2024, he signed a contract with Liga 1 club Persik Kediri to play in 2024–25 season. Sapari made his Liga 1 debut for Persik Kediri on 18 September 2024 in a 1–0 win against Persita Tangerang at the Brawijaya Stadium. Sapari became a regular starter for Persik, and he recorded eight tackles and seven interceptions in his third game with the club.

=== PSIM Yogyakarta ===
On 10 July 2025, he signed a contract with PSIM Yogyakarta. He made his debut for PSIM on 8 August 2025 in a 0–1 away win over Persebaya Surabaya at the Gelora Bung Tomo Stadium, also give assists a winning goal by Ezequiel Vidal.

== Career statistics ==
=== Club ===
As of 10 January 2026.

Club	Season	League			Cup		Continental		Other		Total	
Club	Season	Division	Apps	Goals	Apps	Goals	Apps	Goals	Apps	Goals	Apps	Goals
Persela Lamongan	2023–24	Liga 2	14	0	0	0	–		0	0	14	0
Persik Kediri	2024–25	Liga 1	20	0	0	0	–		0	0	20	0
PSIM Yogyakarta	2025–26	Super League	8	0	0	0	–		0	0	8	0
Career total			42	0	0	0	0	0	0	0	42	0
