= Persib Bandung =

Association football team in Indonesia

- Full name: Persatuan Sepakbola Indonesia Bandung
- Nicknames: Pangeran Biru (Blue Prince); Maung Bandung (Bandung Tigers)
- Short name: SIB
- Founded: 5 January 1919; 107 years ago as Bandoeng Inlandsche Voetbal Bond (BIVB); 18 March 1933; 93 years ago as Persatuan Sepakbola Indonesia Bandung (Persib)
- Ground: Gelora Bandung Lautan Api Stadium
- Capacity: 38,000
- Owner: PT Persib Bandung Bermartabat
- CEO: Glenn Sugita
- Head coach: Igor Tolić
- League: Super League
- 2025–26: Super League, 1st of 18 (champions)
- Website: persib.co.id
Home colours	Away colours	Third colours

Persatuan Sepakbola Indonesia Bandung (lit. 'Indonesian Football Association of Bandung') or simply Persib (Indonesian pronunciation: [pɛrsib]) and commonly known as Persib Bandung, is an Indonesian professional football club based in Bandung, West Java. The club competes in the Indonesia Super League, the top tier of Indonesian football. Founded in 1919 as Bandoeng Inlandsche Voetbal Bond (BIVB), before adopting its current name in 1934. They are considered one of the most successful clubs in Indonesian football. In their history, Persib has won 5 Indonesia Super League titles and 1 Piala Presiden cup.

The club has won three Super League titles back to back, in the 2023–24, 2024–25, and 2025–26 season. Before the current league format, Persib won the 2014 Indonesia Super League, 1994–95 Liga Indonesia Premier Division title, and five Perserikatan titles. Persib's first eight top-flight league titles were achieved from a tournament format, and in the 2024–25 season they clinched their first full-season league format championship. Persib has also reached the quarter-finals of the Asian Club Championship in 1995.

The club's main rivalry with Persija Jakarta is known as Indonesian El Clásico with the best match atmosphere in the history of Indonesian football.

== History ==
=== Founding years (1933–1940) ===
The roots of Persib can be traced back to Bandoeng Inlandsche Voetbal Bond (BIVB) (Dutch for 'Bandung Domestic Football Federation'), formed on 5 January 1919 in accordance to the findings of a thorough research conducted by historians which were announced in 2023. BIVB was a fusion of local clubs in Bandung such as KBS, BB (Bintang Bandoeng), STER (Steeds trappen en rennen), Diana (Doe is alles niet achteruit), Zwaluw, BIVC, BVC, KVC, VVC, Visser, NVC, Brom and Pasar Ketjil to form BIVB. On October 22, 1928, the club changed its name to Bandoeng Indonesische Voetball Bond (BIVB) following the Decision of the Congress of Indonesian Youth and later became one of the founding clubs of the Football Association of Indonesia (PSSI) in 1930.

On 13 May 1932, BIVB merged with the National Voetbal Bond (NVB) and was renamed Persatoean Sepakraga Kebangsaan Bandoeng (PSKB), but the merger was short-lived and ended due to internal conflict. On 4 September 1932, former BIVB officials held another meeting and renamed it Persatoean Sepakraga Indonesia Bandoeng (PSIB). On 17 December 1933, a second merger initiative was carried out between PSIB and NVB, which led to the formation of Persib on 18 March 1934.

Persib won the 1937 Dutch Indies football tournament and reached the finals in the 1933, 1934 and 1936 editions before Indonesia's 1945 independence.

=== Perserikatan era (1940–1994) ===
After Indonesia's independence, Persib was reformed in Bandung in 1948, during the Indonesian National Revolution. In the 1950s, Persib players Aang Witarsa and Anas appeared for the Indonesia national football team.

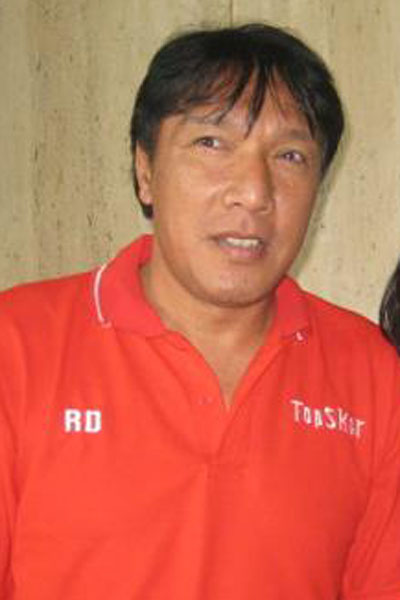
Robby Darwis, one of Persib's legends and former centre-back.

In the Perserikatan era, when Indonesian football clubs were amateur outfits funded by local governments, Persib won their second national title in 1961 and competed in that year's Aga Khan Gold Cup. The club's next significant achievement was as runner-up in the 1966 season. Persib's success declined in the 1970s culminating with their relegation to the First Division in the 1978–79 season. In response, the club hired Polish coach Marek Janota to lead the youth squad and Risnandar Soendoro to manage the senior team. Under their guidance, Persib earned a promotion to the Premier Division, with players including Robby Darwis, Adéng Hudaya, Adjat Sudrajat and Suryamin. The team finished as runners-up in the 1982–83 and 1984–85 seasons.

The club won the league in 1986 by beating Perseman Manokwari by a goal from Djadjang Nurdjaman at the Senayan Stadium. They became champions again in 1990, beating Persebaya Surabaya 2–0. Among the players of this golden era were Samai Setiadi, Adé Mulyono, Asép Sumantri and Djadjang Nurdjaman who would become the only person to win a national title for Persib as a player and coach.

Persib became champions in the final season of the Perserikatan era before it was merged with the fledgling, semi-professional Galatama league to become the Liga Indonesia Premier Division and so earned the right to keep the President Cup in perpetuity.

=== Early professional league era and resurgence (1994–2014) ===
Persib entered the professional era of Indonesian football by becoming the champions of the inaugural 1994–95 Liga Indonesia Premier Division, defeating Petrokimia Putra 1–0 in the final. This achievement qualified Persib for the 1995 Asian Club Championship, where they reached the quarter-finals before being eliminated. Coach Indra Thohir was named AFC Coach of the Year.

The following years were marked by mixed results. The club struggled to match its early success and went through multiple coaching changes. In 2003, Persib finished in the bottom two of the Premier Division and only avoided relegation due to a restructuring of the league system, followed by frequent managerial changes and inconsistent results. By the late 2000s, performances improved, with Persib finishing 3rd in the 2008–09 Indonesia Super League under Jaya Hartono.

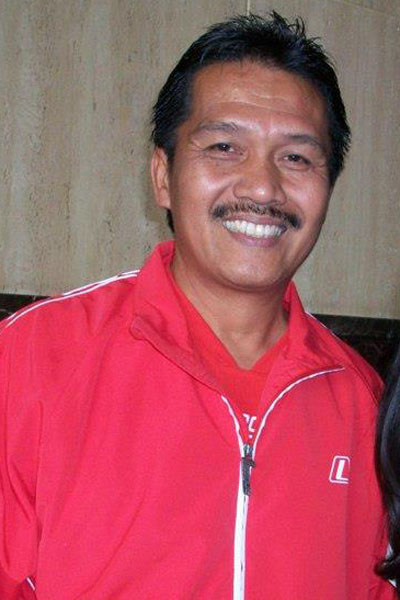
Jaya Hartono, Persib's head coach in the 2008–09 Indonesia Super League.

In 2009, the club's management structure changed significantly with the establishment of PT Persib Bandung Bermartabat, separating the team from municipal government funding in response to national regulations on state budgets for football clubs.

Between 2012 and 2014, constant changes were made to the team. In 2012, Persib hired former player Djadjang Nurdjaman as head coach, and under his leadership the club steadily regained competitiveness. In 2013, Persib also changed its home base from Siliwangi Stadium to Si Jalak Harupat Stadium, due to stadium standard requirements. In 2014, Persib obtained a professional club license from the government of Indonesia. The changes came to fruition, culminated in Persib winning the 2014 Indonesia Super League, their first national title in nearly two decades, by defeating Persipura Jayapura in the final. Striker Ferdinand Sinaga was named the Best Player of the season.

As 2014 champions, Persib qualified for the 2015 AFC Champions League play-offs under interim coach Emral Abus, who replaced Djadjang Nurdjaman on the bench due to licensing requirements. After being eliminated by Hà Nội T&T, the club entered the 2015 AFC Cup, reaching the Round of 16, before losing to Kitchee SC. With the 2015 Indonesia Super League cancelled due to conflict between the government and the PSSI, Persib instead competed in the inaugural President's Cup, which they won.

=== Consistency and recent success (2016–2022) ===
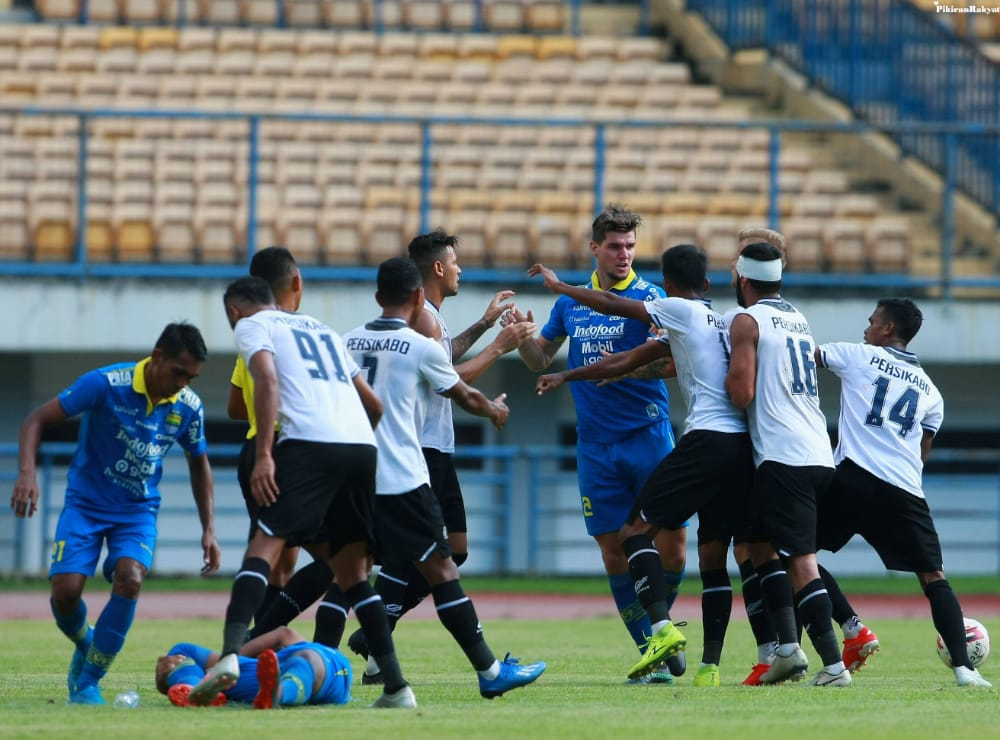
Persib Bandung in a league match against Persikabo 1973 in 2020

In 2016, Persib competed in the Indonesia Soccer Championship A, finishing fifth. The following year saw a significant dip, with the club ending the 2017 Liga 1 season in 13th place despite high-profile signings including Michael Essien and Carlton Cole.

From 2018 onwards, Persib consistently finished in the top six of Liga 1. Under coaches such as Mario Gómez and Robert Alberts, the team placed 4th in 2018 and 6th in 2019, which marked the final season for club veteran Hariono, who had spent 11 years with the club. After the cancellation of the 2020 Liga 1 season due to the COVID-19 pandemic, Persib returned to competitive action in 2021 and finished as runners-up in the 2021–22 Liga 1 season.

During the 2022–23 Liga 1 season, Persib Bandung began the campaign under head coach Robert Alberts, before he resigned in August 2022 following a poor start to the season. The club subsequently appointed Spanish coach Luis Milla, who helped improve the team's performances and establish a more consistent run of results. Under Milla, Persib climbed the league standings and finished third with 62 points from 34 matches, securing qualification for the following season's AFC club competition. Striker David da Silva was a key contributor, scoring 24 league goals to finish as the league's top scorer. Despite their improvement, Persib finished behind champions PSM Makassar and runners-up Persija Jakarta.

=== Three-peat champions under Bojan Hodak (2023–2026) ===
Luis Milla resigned in July 2023 following an inconsistent start to the following campaign, and Persib appointed Croatian head coach, Bojan Hodak as his replacement. Hodak's appointment proved pivotal to the club's subsequent success, as he helped improve the team's performances and guide them towards the top of the league standings. This momentum continued to the 2023–2024 season, where Persib secured the 2023–24 Liga 1 championship round and won the title by defeating Madura United in the finals with a 6–1 aggregate score. Striker David da Silva finishing as top scorer and head coach Bojan Hodak winning the season 'Best Coach' award.

Persib entered the 2024–25 Liga 1 season as defending champions. They maintained their position among the leading teams throughout the campaign and secured a second consecutive league title in May 2025. The achievement made Persib the first club to win back-to-back championships in the Liga 1 era, strengthening their position among Indonesia's most successful clubs. Their domestic success also secured qualification for the 2025–26 AFC Champions League Two, providing another opportunity to compete against clubs from across Asia. The club first back-to-back league triumph since the 1994 and 1995 seasons.

Persib continued their domestic dominance in the 2025–26 Indonesian Super League season. On 23 May 2026, they secured the championship after drawing 0–0 with Persijap Jepara in their final match. Persib finished level on 79 points with Borneo Samarinda but claimed the title through their superior head-to-head record. The championship marked their third consecutive league title, following their victories in 2023–24 and 2024–25, and their fifth Indonesian top-flight title in the professional league era. They also finished the campaign with the league's strongest defensive record, conceding just 22 goals in 34 matches.

In continental competition, Persib participated in the 2024–25 AFC Champions League Two, but were eliminated during the group stage. They returned to the competition in 2025–26 and were drawn in Group G alongside Thailand club Bangkok United, Malaysian club Selangor and Singaporean club Lion City Sailors. Persib secured qualification for the knockout stage after defeating Bangkok United 1–0 in their final group match on 10 December 2025. The result left them top of the group with 13 points as group leaders. In the round of 16, Persib faced off against another Thailand club Ratchaburi. However, Persib suffered a 3–1 defeat on aggregate thus knocking out from the competition.

=== Squad rebuilding and continental ambitions (2027–present) ===
Following their third consecutive Indonesian league championship, Persib Bandung entered the 2026–27 season under new head coach Igor Tolić, who succeeded Bojan Hodak who became the club technical advisor. The club strengthened its squad with the arrivals of Gabriel Mutombo, Danijel Lončar, Gakuto Notsuda, Balsa Sekulić, Luka Menalo, Mariano Peralta, Sandy Walsh and Ragnar Oratmangoen ahead of their title defence. Persib also prepared to compete in the Indonesian Super League, AFC Champions League Two, ASEAN Club Championship and League Cup.

Persib successfully won their first four matches of the 2026–27 AFC Champions League Two group stage, securing qualification for the knockout stage with two matches remaining.

== Team image ==
=== Crest and colours ===
Persib adopted the iconic blue and white jersey from adidas in 1994–95 as champions.

Persib's traditional kit consists of a blue and white shirt with white shorts and socks. Their original kit was red and black with white shorts and socks. Another alternative kit used in the mid-1920s was black and white with white shorts and socks, before the club adopted the blue and white shirt with white shorts and socks in 1936—a combination that remains in use today. During the 1978–1979 season, Persib wore blue and white vertical stripes; this design was a rare variation in the history of the club's kits.

The club's badge is similar to the seal of Bandung. The logo was used because during the early years of Perserikatan, Persib was seen as the representative of the Sundanese people. The overall template of the logo is taken from the logo of the city of Bandung, including the wavy water pattern and the black fortress pattern. The only difference is the addition of the writing "PERSIB" and "1933", with the latter recently being omitted after the decision to change the club's establishment year to 1919. The logo is a heart-shaped shield, and is divided into two parts, outlined with black horizontal girders in four part of the shield.

On top of a golden yellow background with a green colour painting of a mountain that rests on the girder. At the bottom, with a white background by painting four areas wavy lines in blue. At the bottom of the shield there is a golden yellow colour band waved at both ends. On the ribbon was written in black Latin letters that read 'Gemah Ripah Wibawa Mukti', meaning 'Land of the People Subur Makmur'. The sentence was taken from the Kawi language.

The logo's shield symbolises the struggle to achieve goals that should be protected. In addition, the shield has the meaning that Persib needs to be able to endure all sorts of dangers and difficulties.

The colours in the logo represents, yellow: Wealth and nobleness, black: Sturdy, upright and strong, green: Prosperity and cool, white: Purity and faithfulness, and blue: Meaningful. Currently, on top of the logo stands five stars, which represents the five Indonesian league titles that Persib has achieved, each in 1995, 2014, 2024, 2025 and 2026.

The club colours are officially blue and white according to its statute and is used by the fans, the combination Bulao-bodas (blue and white), in their songs and chants. These were the colours of Siliwangi Kingdom. The club original badge was implemented in 1996 consisting of the team's name, Persib, above the logo of Bandung government.

In accordance to PSSI statute, the logo of the club is now protected as an effort to preserve its heritage and appreciation for the club as one of the founding members of PSSI in 1930. It is also not allowed to be altered and replaced in any forms. Additionally, this rule includes prohibition of changing the name, home base and history of the club.

On 25 August 2026, Persib officially unveiled the club's crest featured a fifth star in recognition of its latest league championship, while a special blue-and-white kit was introduced for its 2026–27 season continental campaign.

=== Supporters ===
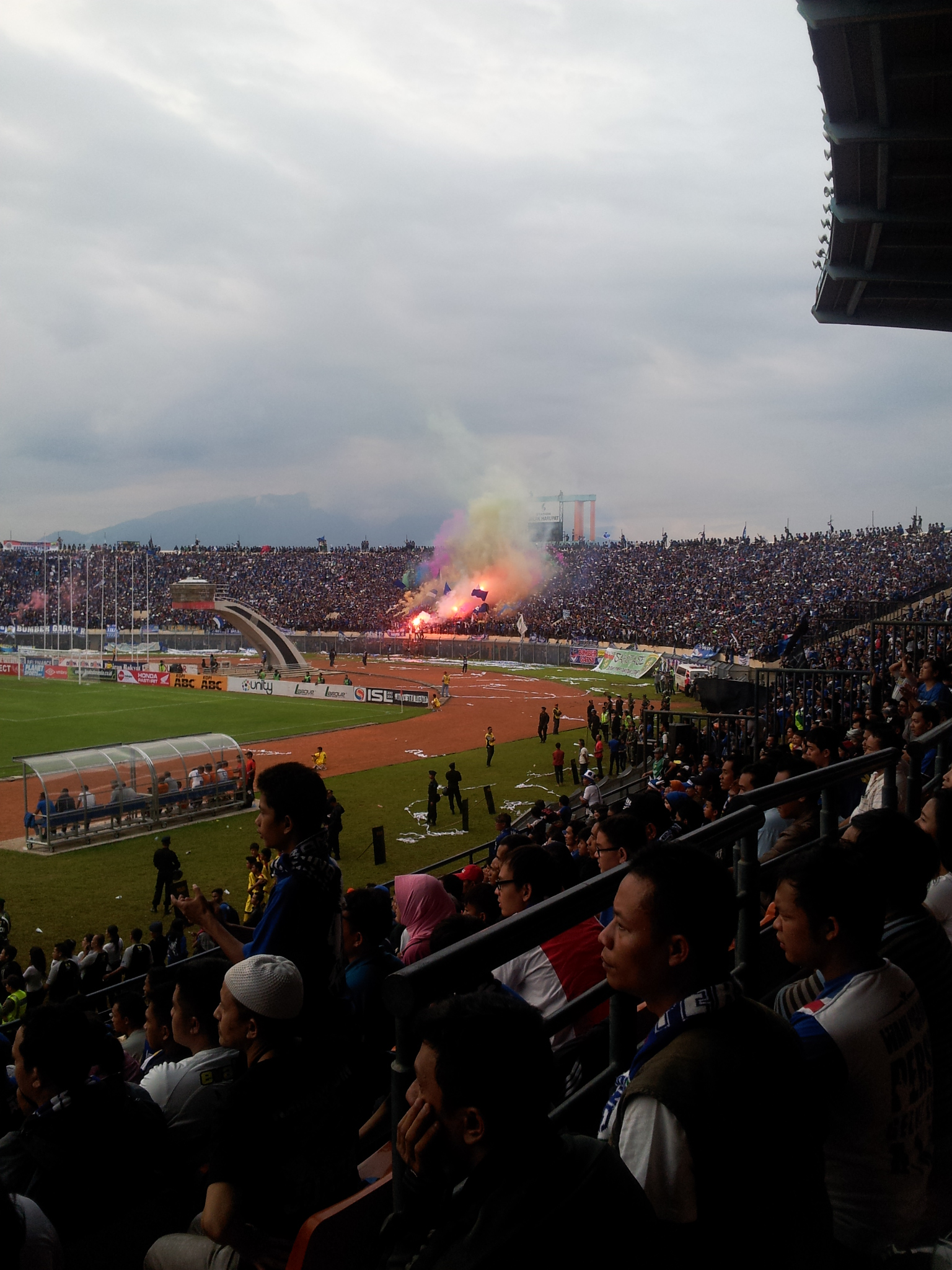
Supporters display a celebration during a match in Si Jalak Harupat Stadium.

Persib supporters have a fan base that has grown significantly since the club's founding. They are spread throughout the country, particularly in West Java and the Indonesian diaspora, representing the Sundanese people. The supporters often refer to themselves as "Bobotoh", a Sundanese term meaning 'people who raise the spirits of those about to fight (or animals about to fight)'. The use of the term was documented in the local newspaper Sipatahoenan in 1938.

The first organized supporters' group was the Viking Persib Club (VPC), founded in 1993, considered the first formal football supporters' organization in Indonesia. This group also played a role in the rise of hooliganism in Indonesian football around 2000. Other prominent organized groups include Northern Wall and Southside Terrace.

Greatest In The Land - Persib football anthem

We are the greatest in the land,
Forever, still until the end,
Remember just god can stop us,
We are the greatest in the land.

We have shown you our supremacy,
Cause this is more than just a victory,
Remember just god can stop us,
We are the greatest in the land.

We'll follow you over the land and sea,
We're masters all of history,
So, let the world understand,
We are the greatest in the land.

Once it enters on your veins,
Flows in your blood, it'll never come out again,
Remember just god can stop us,
We are the greatest in the land.

We'll follow you over the land and sea,
We're masters all of history,
So, let the world understand,
We are the greatest in the land.

— "Greatest In The Land" lyrics, Goodbye Weekend

Halo, Halo Bandung is a national song by Ismail Marzuki which describes the spirit of struggle of the people of Bandung city during the Bandung Sea of Fire incident in 1946. In the first seconds of the match, the fans will sing this song as a symbol of struggle and resistance against opposing players.

Notable fans include Oto Iskandar di Nata (Indonesian politician), Try Sutrisno (6th Vice President of the Republic of Indonesia), Kamidia Radisti (Miss Indonesia 2007), Arina Ephipania (lead vocalist of Mocca), Melody Nurramdhani Laksani (former JKT48 member), Bastian Steel (former Coboy Junior member), Ariel (lead vocalist from Noah), Conchita Caroline (Sportcaster), Ananda Omesh (Indonesian presenter), and Yolla Yuliana (volleyball player).

=== Rivalries ===
The rivalry with Persija Jakarta is known as the Indonesian El Clásico or Indonesian Derbies, which is one of the biggest rivalries in football in Indonesia. This rivalry started from a national amateur competition that was not too intense, but it increased after the Indonesian professional football league system was implemented in 1994–95 season. Before the match, players will be secured using Pindad Komodo to enter the stadium. Supporters of them may not be present at away matches, because of restrictions from the Indonesia national security otorition to avoid clashes. Including competition with PSMS Medan, PSM Makassar, and Persebaya Surabaya, but player security is as usual and away supporters are allowed.

== Finances and ownership ==
Persib was the richest club on Southeast Asia in 2015 with total wealth of IDR 11.2 trillion according to Goal.com (Indonesian edition) website.

Persib's success on becoming one of the most powerful financial club is certainly not without means. Director of Marketing Persib, M. Farhan said that the club's success was not separated from the marketing team's performance.

Persib was previously owned by the city government and its budget was allocated from the city budget. In accordance with the regulations of Permendagri No. 13/2006 which was revised to Permendagri No. 59/2007, professional clubs are no longer allowed to use government budget. This condition forced 36 Football Union, the stakeholder of Persib, to agree giving a mandate to former Bandung Mayor Dada Rosada to save Persib so it can still enter the competition. PT. Persib Bandung Bermartabat (PT. PBB) was then founded on 20 August 2009 as the legal basis of the club.

Erick Thohir, the owner of Mahaka Media, Viva Media, Satria Muda BritAma Jakarta, and former owner or part-owner of D.C. United, Inter Milan, and Philadelphia 76ers was one of the commissioners in PT. Persib Bandung Bermartabat.

=== Media coverage ===
Persib TV is the official YouTube channel that is owned by Persib and contains club activities such as exclusive interviews with players and staff, club information and match highlights.

== Stadium ==
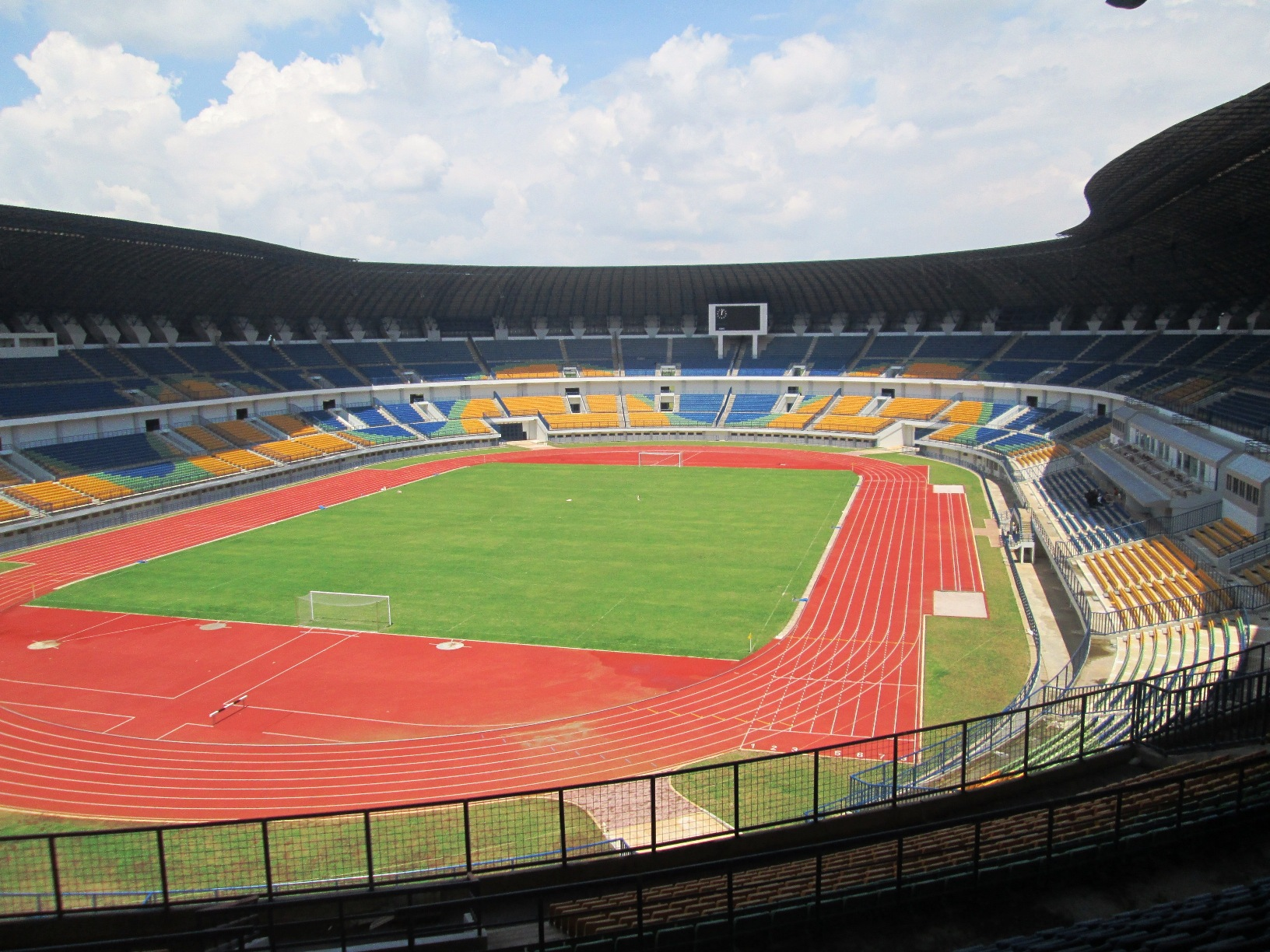
Gelora Bandung Lautan Api Stadium under construction in 2013.

Persib plays their home matches at Gelora Bandung Lautan Api Stadium, after moving from Si Jalak Harupat Stadium in 2016. Gelora Bandung Lautan Api Stadium's design adheres to the international standards for stadium design. It has 38,000 individual seats. The grass used is Zoysia matrella (Linn) Merr which is of FIFA standard class. The stadium is equipped with football pitch, athletic track, helipad, four storey with an area of 72,000 square meters, combined with other supporting facilities with total of 40 hectares.

In 2022, Persib secured a deal with Bandung government to lease the stadium for 30 years.

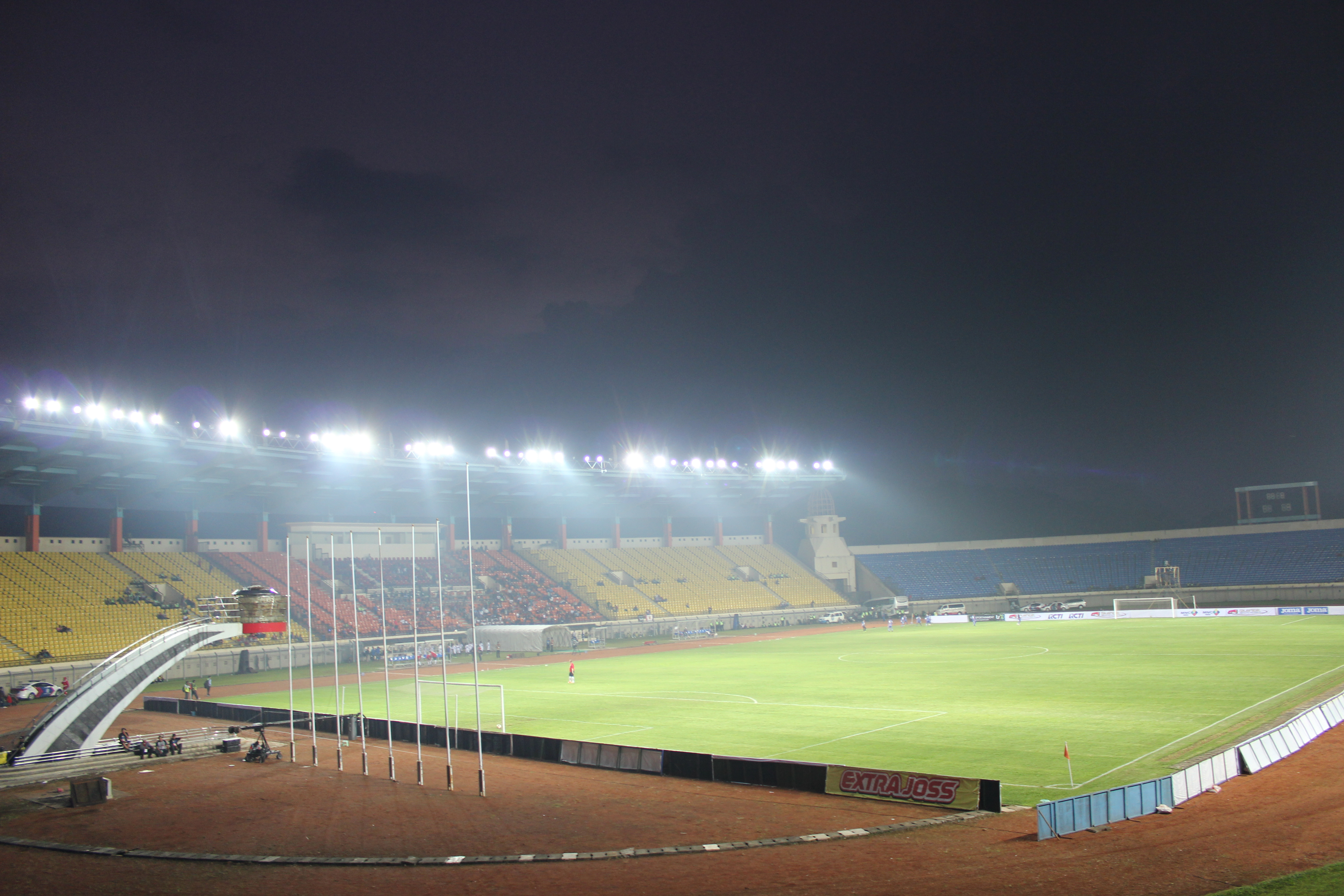
Si Jalak Harupat Stadium in 2014.

However in October 2026, Persib temporarily relocated a few selected home matches to the Si Jalak Harupat Stadium while a maintenance work was carried out on Gelora Bandung Lautan Api Stadium playing surface.

=== Training ground ===
For the primary training ground and flat for players, Persib used to utilise Persib Stadium at Jalan Ahmad Yani, which was formerly known as Sidolig Stadium. In addition to this, Persib also used Arcamanik Stadium for their training. As of 2025, Persib uses the secondary field in the Gelora Bandung Lautan Api Stadium area. It is expected that Persib will build a dedicated training ground called "Kampoeng Persib" as the expansion of the current training field in GBLA.

== Academy development ==
=== Persib Academy ===
Persib launched Persib Academy, directly affiliated with Inter Milan. The inauguration of Persib Academy was held at Siliwangi Stadium on 13 February 2018. In the launching Persib bring then president and vice-president of Inter Milan, Erick Thohir and Javier Zanetti. In addition, there were also Director and senior officials of Persib and also Director of Global Youth Business Inter Academy, Barbara Biggi and Inter Academy Head Coach, Andrea Ratti and his staff. For the academy cooperation, Inter Milan specifically brought in Inter Academy coach, Claudio Brambilla. The plan he will be in Bandung for two months ahead. He will provide direct treatment and share his knowledge to learners and coaches Persib Academy. Persib Academy is a form of collaboration with Inter Academy, not only presenting Inter Academy coaches, Persib Academy will use the academy curriculum based in Centro Sportivo Giacinto Facchetti, Milan, Italy.

=== Bandung United ===
Bandung United competes in Liga 4, the fourth tier of Indonesian football. The club was founded in 2019 after the takeover of Blitar United by PT. Persib Bandung Bermartabat and its subsequent relocation to Bandung. It is the feeder club of Persib and holds its home matches at Siliwangi Stadium.

=== Prawira Bandung and Satria Muda ===
Through PT. PBB, Persib was related to Indonesian Basketball League club Prawira Bandung, having acquired and renamed the club from Garuda Bandung in 2018. The club was said to be "the basketball branch of Persib". However, PT. PBB acquired Satria Muda, and disbanded Prawira in 2025.

=== PSGC Ciamis ===
On 7 June 2026, Persib officially announced a partnership with PSGC Ciamis. According to Persib's manager, Umuh Muchtar, PSGC Ciamis can be considered as Persib's B-Team as part of the collaboration. Other than player development, PSGC could also benefit from learning how to manage a club professionally from Persib. In July, Persib confirmed that PSGC would be their satellite team.

== Kit suppliers and shirt sponsors ==
The club has been outfitted by Kelme since 2025. Their previous kit manufacturers were Adidas, Reebok, Nike, Vilour, Diadora, Joma, Mitre, League, and Sportama.

The following is a list of kit manufacturers by year:

Period	Kit manufacturer
1994–1996	(Germany) Adidas
1999–2000	(England) Reebok
2000–2003	(United States) Nike
2003–2009	(Indonesia) Vilour
2009–2010	(Italy) Diadora
2010–2011	(Spain) Joma
2011–2012	(England) Mitre
2012–2015	(Indonesia) League
2016–2025	(Indonesia) Sportama
2025–present	(Spain) Kelme

=== Sponsorship ===
Persib is sponsored by:

- Kelme
- Indofood
- Kopi ABC
- Bank BJB
- Combiphar
- Insto
- Greenfields
- Trima+
- FOOM Unity
- Semen Kujang
- Le Minerale
- Teh Pucuk Harum
- Se'Indonesia
- Panther Energy
- Rinso
- Sunlight

== Affiliated clubs ==
- (Italy) Inter Milan
- (Australia) Adelaide United
- (Germany) Borussia Dortmund
- (Indonesia) Bandung United
- (Indonesia) PSGC Ciamis

== Players ==
=== First-team squad ===
As of 8 August 2026

Note: Flags indicate national team as defined under FIFA eligibility rules; some limited exceptions apply. Players may hold more than one non-FIFA nationality.

No.	Pos.	Nation	Player
2	MF	IDN	Eliano Reijnders
3	DF	FRA	Gabriel Mutombo
4	DF	BRA	Júlio César
5	DF	IDN	Kakang Rudianto
6	DF	IDN	Sandy Walsh
7	MF	IDN	Beckham Putra (3rd captain)
8	MF	ARG	Luciano Guaycochea
9	FW	BIH	Luka Menalo
10	FW	ARG	Mariano Peralta
11	MF	IDN	Dedi Kusnandar (vice-captain)
13	MF	IDN	Febri Hariyadi
14	GK	IDN	Teja Paku Alam

No.	Pos.	Nation	Player
17	MF	JPN	Gakuto Notsuda
18	MF	IDN	Adam Alis (4th captain)
22	DF	CRO	Danijel Lončar
23	MF	IDN	Marc Klok (captain)
33	MF	IDN	Thom Haye
40	MF	IDN	Ikhwan Tanamal
48	DF	ARG	Patricio Matricardi (5th captain)
77	FW	IDN	Ragnar Oratmangoen
81	GK	IDN	Fitrah Maulana
94	FW	BRA	Uilliam Barros
97	MF	BRA	Berguinho
99	FW	MNE	Balša Sekulić

=== Under-23s ===
Note: Flags indicate national team as defined under FIFA eligibility rules; some limited exceptions apply. Players may hold more than one non-FIFA nationality.

No.	Pos.	Nation	Player
19	MF	IDN	Nazriel Alfaro
30	FW	IDN	Rafi Rasyiq

No.	Pos.	Nation	Player
60	GK	IDN	Rhaka Syafaka

=== Out on loan ===
Note: Flags indicate national team as defined under FIFA eligibility rules; some limited exceptions apply. Players may hold more than one non-FIFA nationality.

No.	Pos.	Nation	Player
12	DF	IDN	Henhen Herdiana (at PSM Makassar)
21	DF	IDN	Faris Abdul Hafizh (at PSGC Ciamis)
29	DF	IDN	Al Hamra Hehanussa (at Garudayaksa)
36	MF	IDN	Athaya Zahran (at PSGC Ciamis)
44	DF	IDN	Dion Markx (at Persita Tangerang)

No.	Pos.	Nation	Player
66	DF	IDN	Kevin Pasha (at PSGC Ciamis)
67	FW	IDN	Saddil Ramdani (at Persebaya Surabaya)
71	MF	IDN	Adzikry Fadlillah (at Persijap Jepara)
73	DF	IDN	Zulkifli Lukmansyah (at Semen Padang)
98	FW	BRA	Ramon Tanque (at Chennaiyin)

=== Retired numbers ===
- 24 – Hariono

== Management and staff ==
=== Official and coaching staff ===
As of June 2026

Position	Name
CEO	(Indonesia) Glenn Sugita
Deputy CEO	(Indonesia) Adhitia Putra Herawan
Manager	(Indonesia) Umuh Muchtar
Sporting director	(Malaysia) Stanley Bernard
Secretary	(Indonesia) Irfan Suryadireja
Technical advisor	(Croatia) Bojan Hodak
Head of scouting	(Egypt) Ahmed El Wardani
Head coach	(Croatia) Igor Tolić
Assistant coach	(Croatia) Zlatko Runje (Indonesia) Achmad Jufriyanto
Goalkeeping coach	(Croatia) Mario Jozić (Indonesia) I Made Wirawan
Fitness coach	(Croatia) Karlo Reinholz (Indonesia) Yaya Sunarya
Doctor	(Indonesia) Wira Prasetya
Physiotherapist	(Indonesia) Benidektus Adi Prianto (Brazil) Geraldo Santos
Masseur	(Indonesia) Tatang Sutisna
Masseur	(Indonesia) Iyang Maulana
Kit man	(Indonesia) Ujang Suparman
Kit man	(Indonesia) Heri Rudiana
Kit man	(Indonesia) Fikri Apriansyah
Video analyst	(Indonesia) Atreeyu Andrey Pamungkas
Video analyst	(Indonesia) Gunawan Mochamad Natsir
Video analyst	(Indonesia) Pandu Satiagraha Effendi
First team technical liaison	(Indonesia) Aun Rahman

== Honours ==
Type	Honours	Titles	Seasons
League	Liga Indonesia Premier Division/Super League	5	1994–95, 2014, 2023–24, 2024–25, 2025–26
League	Perserikatan	5	1937, 1959–61, 1986, 1989–90, 1993–94,
Cup	Piala Presiden	1	2015
Others	Brunei Pesta Sukan Cup	1	1986
Others	Dewata Challenge Series	1	2026

Bold is for those competition that are currently active.

=== Persib Bandung squad during their championship season ===
The usual starting line-up
1994–95 season	2014 season	2023–24 season	2024–25 season	2025–26 season

== Award winners ==
=== Domestic ===
- Player of the Season
  - (Indonesia) Ferdinand Sinaga (2014)
  - (Spain) Tyronne del Pino (2024–25)
- League Golden Boot
  - (Indonesia) Cristian Gonzáles (2007–08)
  - (Brazil) David da Silva (2023–24)
- Coach of the Season
  - (Croatia) Bojan Hodak (2023–24, 2024–25, 2025–26)
- Team of the Season
  - (Indonesia) Ardi Idrus (2018)
  - (Indonesia) Teja Paku Alam (2021–22)
  - (Brazil) David Da Silva (2022–23, 2023–24)
  - (Indonesia) Marc Klok (2023–24)
  - (Brazil) Ciro Alves (2023–24)
  - (Spain) Alberto Rodríguez (2023–24)
  - (Spain) Tyronne del Pino (2024–25)
  - (Brazil) Gustavo França (2024–25)
  - (Indonesia) Beckham Putra (2025–26)
  - (Indonesia) Thom Haye (2025–26)
  - (Italy) Federico Barba (2025–26)

== Records and statistics ==
As of 10 October 2026.

Top 10 all-time appearances
Rank	Player	Years	Club appeareances
1	(Indonesia) Hariono	2008–2019	239
2	(Indonesia) Robby Darwis	1983–1988	228
3	(Indonesia) Atep Rizal	2008–2018	227
4	(Indonesia) Dedi Kusnandar	2014–2015, 2017–present	198
5	(Indonesia) Febri Hariyadi	2016–present	185
6	(Indonesia) Beckham Putra	2018–present	179
7	(Indonesia) Supardi Nasir	2013–2016, 2017–2022	174
8	(Indonesia) Tony Sucipto	2011−2018	173
9	(Indonesia) Marc Klok	2021–present	160
10	(Indonesia) Nick Kuipers	2019–2025	158

Top 10 all-time scorers
Rank	Player	Club appeareances	Total goals
1	(Brazil) David da Silva	113	74
2	(Chad) Ezechiel N'Douassel	70	40
3	(Brazil) Ciro Alves	107	35
4	(Spain) Tyronne del Pino	40	21
5	(Indonesia) Sergio van Dijk	38	20
5	(Indonesia) Febri Hariyadi	185	20
7	(Indonesia) Atep Rizal	227	19
8	(Indonesia) Beckham Putra	179	18
10	(France) Andrew Jung	33	16
10	(Indonesia) Frets Butuan	109	16

- Biggest wins: 7–0 vs Persiwa Wamena (On 11 February 2019)
- Heaviest defeats:
  - 5–1 vs Arema (On 30 July 2019)
  - 5–1 vs PSM Makassar (On 29 August 2022)
- Youngest ever debutant: Beckham Putra ~ 17 years 4 months 1 days old (On 2 March 2019 vs Persikabo 1973)
- Oldest ever player: I Made Wirawan ~ 41 years 4 months 15 days old (On 15 April 2023 vs Persikabo 1973)
- Youngest goal scorers: Gian Zola ~ 18 years 9 months 15 days old (On 20 May 2017 vs Borneo Samarinda)
- Oldest goal scorers: (Montenegro) Miljan Radović ~ 36 years 8 months 8 days old (On 26 June 2012 vs Deltras)

== Notable players ==
=== International capped players ===
As of 2026–27 season.

AFC/OFC.: (Iraq) Frans Putros; (Japan) Gakuto Notsuda; (Palestine) Mohammed Rashid; (Philippines) Daisuke Sato; (Philippines) Kevin Ray Mendoza; (Philippines) Omid Nazari; (Philippines) Satoshi Ōtomo; (Singapore) Baihakki Khaizan; (Singapore) Noh Alam Shah; (Singapore) Shahril Ishak; (Syria) Naser Al Sebai; (Turkmenistan) Artur Gevorkýan; (Afghanistan) Farshad Noor; (Thailand) Pradit Taweechai; (Thailand) Suchao Nuchnum; (Thailand) Sinthaweechai Hathairattanakool	CAF.: (Burkina Faso) Brahima Traoré; (Cape Verde) Mailson Lima; (Cameroon) Christian Bekamenga; (Chad) Ezechiel N'Douassel; (Gabon) Lévy Madinda; (Ghana) Michael Essien; (Ghana) Moses Sakyi; (Morocco) Redouane Barkaoui; (Mali) Djibril Coulibaly	UEFA.: (Bosnia and Herzegovina) Luka Menalo; (England) Carlton Cole; (France) Layvin Kurzawa; (Netherlands) Geoffrey Castillion; (Italy) Federico Barba; (Italy) Stefano Beltrame; (Montenegro) Balša Sekulić; (Montenegro) Vladimir Vujović; (Montenegro) Zdravko Dragićević; (Slovenia) Rene Mihelič; (Wales) Adam Przybek	CONMEBOL/ CONCACAF.: (Brazil) Ciro Alves; (Argentina) Jonatan Bauman; (Curaçao) Gervane Kastaneer; (Chile) Claudio Lizama

== Managerial history ==
Head coaches by years (1980–present)

Manager	Period	Achievements
(Indonesia) Risnandar Soendoro	1980–83	
(Indonesia) Omo Suratmo	1983–84	
(Indonesia) Ade Dana	1984–85	
(Indonesia) Nandar Iskandar	1985–88	
(Indonesia) Ade Dana	1989–93	– 1989–90 Perserikatan
(Indonesia) **Indra Thohir**	1993–95	– 1993–94 Perserikatan – 1994–95 Liga Indonesia Premier Division
(Indonesia) Risnandar Soendoro	1995–96	
(Indonesia) Nandar Iskandar	1996–98	
(Indonesia) M. Suryamin	1998–00	
(Indonesia) Indra Thohir (2)	2000–01	
(Indonesia) Deny Syamsudin	2001–02	
(Poland) Marek Śledzianowski	2002–03	
(Indonesia) Bambang Sukowiyono (Indonesia) Iwan Sunarya	2003	
(Chile) Juan Páez	2003–05	
(Indonesia) Indra Thohir (3)	2005	
(Indonesia) Risnandar Soendoro	2005–06	
(Moldova) Iurie Arcan	1 April 2006–28 November 2007	
(Indonesia) Djadjang Nurdjaman (Indonesia) Robby Darwis	28 November 2007– 10 February 2008	
(Indonesia) Jaya Hartono	19 February 2008–23 April 2010	
(Indonesia) Robby Darwis (caretaker) (2)	17 April 2010–20 September 2010	
(France) Darko Janacković	20 September 2010–20 November 2010	
(Indonesia) Daniel Roekito	20 November 2010–31 August 2011	
(Croatia) Drago Mamić	1 September 2011–28 March 2012	
(Indonesia) Robby Darwis	28 March 2012–1 July 2012	
(Indonesia) **Djadjang Nurdjaman**	13 August 2012–8 January 2016	– 2014 Indonesia Super League – 2015 Piala Presiden
(Serbia) Dejan Antonić	20 January 2016–11 June 2016	
(Indonesia) Herrie Setyawan (caretaker)	11 June 2016–28 June 2016	
(Indonesia) Djadjang Nurdjaman (2)	29 June 2016–16 July 2017	
(Indonesia) Herrie Setyawan (caretaker) (2)	2 September 2017–15 November 2017	
(Argentina) Mario Gómez	28 November 2017–12 December 2018	
(Montenegro) Miljan Radović	9 January 2019–3 May 2019	
(Netherlands) Robert Alberts	3 May 2019–10 August 2022	
(Indonesia) Budiman Yunus (caretaker)	10 August 2022–24 August 2022	
(Spain) Luis Milla	22 August 2022–15 July 2023	
(Indonesia) Yaya Sunarya (caretaker)	15 July 2023–26 July 2023	
(Croatia) **Bojan Hodak**	26 July 2023–25 May 2026	– 2023–24 Liga 1 – 2024–25 Liga 1 – 2025–26 Super League
(Croatia) Igor Tolić	26 May 2026–present	

Notes:

1. Coaches in italic indicate the caretaker position.
2. Coaches in **bold** indicate those who led the team to a championship.

== Club captains ==
The following is a list of Persib Bandung captains in official competitions (records available from the 1970s onwards)

Years	Player	Nationality	Position	Ref
1970–1980	Encas Tonif	(Indonesia)	DF	
1980–1990	Adeng Hudaya	(Indonesia)	DF	
1990–1997	Robby Darwis	(Indonesia)	DF	
1997–2005	Dadang Hidayat	(Indonesia)	DF/MF	
2006–2009	Suwita Pata	(Indonesia)	DF/MF	
2009–2011	Eka Ramdani	(Indonesia)	MF	
2011–2013	Maman Abdurahman	(Indonesia)	DF	
2013–2018	Atep Rizal	(Indonesia)	MF	
2018–2020	Supardi Nasir	(Indonesia)	DF	
2020–2022	Victor Igbonefo	(Indonesia)	DF	
2022–2023	Achmad Jufriyanto	(Indonesia)	DF	
2023–present	Marc Klok	(Indonesia)	MF	

== Season by season record ==
Season(s)	League/Division	Tms.	Pos.	Piala Indonesia	I-League Cup	AFC competition(s)		ASEAN Club Championship
1994–95	Premier Division	34	1st	–	–	–	–	–
1995–96	Premier Division	31	Second round	–	–	Asian Club Championship	Quarter-finals	–
1996–97	Premier Division	33	Second round	–	–	–	–	–
1997–98	Premier Division	31	did not finish	–	–	–	–	–
1998–99	Premier Division	28	3rd group B, West Division	–	–	–	–	–
1999–00	Premier Division	28	8th, West Division	–	–	–	–	–
2001	Premier Division	28	Second round	–	–	–	–	–
2002	Premier Division	24	8th, West Division	–	–	–	–	–
2003	Premier Division	20	16th	–	–	–	–	–
2004	Premier Division	18	6th	–	–	–	–	–
2005	Premier Division	28	5th, West Division	Second round	–	–	–	–
2006	Premier Division	28	12th, West Division	First round	–	–	–	–
2007–08	Premier Division	36	5th, West Division	Second round	–	–	–	–
2008–09	Indonesia Super League	18	3rd	Third round	–	–	–	–
2009–10	Indonesia Super League	18	4th	Quarter-finals	–	–	–	–
2010–11	Indonesia Super League	18	7th	–	–	–	–	–
2011–12	Indonesia Super League	18	8th	did not participated	–	–	–	–
2013	Indonesia Super League	18	4th	–	–	–	–	–
2014	Indonesia Super League	22	1st	–	–	–	–	–
2015	Indonesia Super League	18	did not finish	–	–	AFC Champions League	Preliminary round 2	–
2015	Indonesia Super League	18	did not finish	–	–	AFC Cup	Round of 16	–
2016	Indonesia Soccer Championship A	18	5th	–	–	–	–	–
2017	Liga 1	18	13th	–	–	–	–	–
2018	Liga 1	18	4th	Quarter-finals	–	–	–	–
2019	Liga 1	18	6th	–	–	–	–	–
2020	Liga 1	18	did not finish	–	–	–	–	–
2021–22	Liga 1	18	2nd	–	–	–	–	–
2022–23	Liga 1	18	3rd	–	–	–	–	–
2023–24	Liga 1	18	1st	–	–	–	–	–
2024–25	Liga 1	18	1st	–	–	AFC Champions League Two	Group stage	–
2025–26	Super League	18	1st	–	–	AFC Champions League Two	Round of 16	–
2026–27	Super League	18	TBD	–	TBD	AFC Champions League Two	TBD	–

Key

- Tms. = Number of teams
- Pos. = Position in league

== AFC club ranking ==
As of 26 May 2026

Current Rank	Country	Team	Points
32	(Uzbekistan)	Pakhtakor Tashkent	14.57
33	(Indonesia)	Persib Bandung	14.56
34	(Japan)	Urawa Red Diamonds	14.54
35	(Japan)	FC Tokyo	14.49

== Performance in AFC competitions ==
Season	Competition	Round	Nat	Club	Home	Away
1995	Asian Club Championship	First round	(Thailand)	Bangkok Bank	2–0	0–1
1995	Asian Club Championship	Second round	(Philippines)	Pasay	3–1	2–1
1995	Asian Club Championship	Quarter-finals	(Japan)	Verdy Kawasaki	2–3	—
1995	Asian Club Championship	Quarter-finals	(South Korea)	Ilhwa Chunma	2–5	—
1995	Asian Club Championship	Quarter-finals	(Thailand)	Thai Farmers Bank	1–2	—
2015	AFC Champions League	Preliminary round 2	(Vietnam)	Hanoi T&T	—	0–4
2015	AFC Cup	Group H	(Maldives)	New Radiant	4–1	1–0
2015	AFC Cup	Group H	(Myanmar)	Ayeyawady United	3–3	1–1
2015	AFC Cup	Group H	(Laos)	Lao Toyota	1–0	0–0
2015	AFC Cup	Round of 16	(Hong Kong)	Kitchee SC	0–2	—
2024–25	AFC Champions League Two	Group F	(Thailand)	Port	0–1	2–2
2024–25	AFC Champions League Two	Group F	(China)	Zhejiang Professional	3–4	0–1
2024–25	AFC Champions League Two	Group F	(Singapore)	Lion City Sailors	1–1	3–2
2025–26	AFC Champions League Two	Play-off round	(Philippines)	Manila Digger	2–1	—
2025–26	AFC Champions League Two	Group G	(Singapore)	Lion City Sailors	1–1	2–3
2025–26	AFC Champions League Two	Group G	(Thailand)	Bangkok United	1–0	2–0
2025–26	AFC Champions League Two	Group G	(Malaysia)	Selangor	2–0	3–2
2025–26	AFC Champions League Two	Round of 16	(Thailand)	Ratchaburi	1–0	0–3
2026–27	AFC Champions League Two	Play-off round	(Philippines)	Manila Digger	1–0	—
2026–27	AFC Champions League Two	Group E	(South Korea)	FC Seoul	25 Nov '26	1–0
2026–27	AFC Champions League Two	Group E	(Vietnam)	Thể Công–Viettel	1–0	2 Dec '26
2026–27	AFC Champions League Two	Group E	(Australia)	Melbourne Victory	2–0	2–1

== Performance in AFF competitions ==
Season	Competition	Round	Nat	Club	Home	Away
2026–27	ASEAN Club Championship	Group B	(Thailand)	Port	—	3–1
2026–27	ASEAN Club Championship	Group B	(Myanmar)	Shan United	6–0	—
2026–27	ASEAN Club Championship	Group B	(Singapore)	Lion City Sailors	—	10 Dec '26
2026–27	ASEAN Club Championship	Group B	(Malaysia)	Johor Darul Ta'zim	17 Dec '26	—
2026–27	ASEAN Club Championship	Group B	(Cambodia)	PKR Svay Rieng	—	25 Feb '27
2026–27	ASEAN Club Championship	Group B	(Vietnam)	Cong An Hanoi	4 Mar '27	—

== See also ==
- List of football clubs in Indonesia
- Persib Putri
- Persib Bandung U-21
- Persib Bandung U-19
