= 2025–26 Persija Jakarta season =

Persija Jakarta
2025–26 season
- Owner: PT Persija Jaya Jakarta
- Director: Mohamad Prapanca
- Head Coach: (Brazil) Maurício Ferreira de Souza
- Stadium: Jakarta International Stadium; Gelora Bung Karno Main Stadium; Segiri Stadium (only on 10 May 2026)
- Super League: 3rd
- Top goalscorer: League: Emaxwell Souza (16); All: Emaxwell Souza (16)
- Highest home attendance: 56,989 v Arema Malang (8 Feb 2026)
- Lowest home attendance: 5,126 v Persik Kediri (20 Nov 2025)
- Average home league attendance: 23,592
- Biggest win: 4–0 v Persita Tangerang (H); 10 August 2025; 4–0 v Persis Solo (H); 27 April 2026
- Biggest defeat: 1–3 v Borneo F.C. Samarinda (A); 28 September 2025
Home colours	Away colours	Third colours

The 2025–26 season is Persija's 92nd competitive season. They have not been relegated since the Perserikatan competition started in 1933. This season is Persija's 31st consecutive seasons in top-flight since professional competition formed on 1994. The season covers the period from 1 July 2025 to 30 June 2026. This season Persija passes club license granted with sanction for AFC Champions League 2, granted for AFC Challenge League and Super League for season 2025–26.

== Coaching staff ==
Position	Staff
Manager	(Indonesia) Marsda TNI (Purn) Ardhi Tjahjoko
Head Coach	(Brazil) Maurício Ferreira de Souza
Assistant Head Coach	(Brazil) Italo Bartole Resende (Indonesia) Ricky Nelson Gideon Ndun
Goalkeeper Coach	(Brazil) Gerson Rodrigues Rios
Fitness Coach	(Brazil) Vitor Branco Da Cruz (Indonesia) Ilham Ralibi, S.Pd.
Individual Development Coach	(Indonesia) Ferdiansyah
Video Analyst	(Brazil) Caio Vito Jordao de Araujo (Indonesia) Dzykry Lazuardi Zammurudan Soeharno
Statistician	(Indonesia) Dani Budi Rayoga
Opposition/Player Scouting	(Indonesia) Petrick Sinuraya
Team Doctor	(Indonesia) Muhammad Adeansyah
Nutritionist	(Indonesia) Emilia Achmadi, MS RDN
Physiotherapist	(Indonesia) Muhamad Yanizar Lubis (Indonesia) Jeremiah Halomoan Simamora
Masseur	(Indonesia) Akhmad Aditya Subkhi (Indonesia) Aditya Yulistyawan
Kitman	(Indonesia) Aries Tri Kurniawan (Indonesia) Candra Darmawan
Interpreter	(Brazil) Claudio Daniel de Oliveira Luzardi

=== Management ===
Director	(Indonesia) Mohammad Prapanca
Financial Director	(Indonesia) Koko Afiat
Sporting Director	(Indonesia) Bambang Pamungkas
Business Director	(Indonesia) Ivi Sumarna Suryana
Chief Development Youth	(Indonesia) Ricky Nelson
Commercial & Marketing Director	(France) Sébastien Leclerc
Match Organizing Committee	(Indonesia) Arief Perdana Kusuma
Club Secretary	(Indonesia) Regi Hariansyah
Media Officer	(Indonesia) Kukuh Wahyudi
Photographer	(Indonesia) Khairul Imam (Indonesia) Faizal Maulana Akbar
Videographer	(Indonesia) Yudhistira Achmad Nugroho
Ground (capacity and dimensions)	Jakarta International Stadium (80,000 / 105x68 metres); Gelora Bung Karno (77,193 / 105x68 metres)
Training Ground	Persija Training Center, Sawangan

== New contracts ==
No.	Pos	Player/Staff	Contract length	Contract end	Date	Source
2	RB	(Indonesia) Ilham Rio Fahmi	3 Years	28 May 2028	28 May 2025	
36	MF	(Indonesia) Aditya Warman	3 Years	28 May 2028	28 May 2025	
77	LW	(Indonesia) Dony Tri Pamungkas	3 Years	28 May 2028	28 May 2025	
70	FW	(Brazil) Gustavo Almeida dos Santos	2 Years	3 June 2027	3 June 2025	
1	GK	(Brazil) Carlos Eduardo Soares Mota	1 Year	21 June 2026	21 June 2025	
19	MF	(Indonesia) Hanif Abdurrauf Sjahbandi	2 Years	24 June 2027	24 June 2025	
23	DF	(Indonesia) Hansamu Yama Pranata	1 Year	28 June 2026	28 June 2025	

== Transfers ==
=== In ===
==== First round ====
No.	Pos	Name	Transferred From	Fee	Date	Source
56	FW	(Indonesia) Alfriyanto Nico Saputro	(Indonesia) Dewa United Banten F.C.	End of Loan	12 June 2025	
98	CF	(Indonesia) Eksel Timothy Joseph Runtukahu	(Indonesia) PS Barito Putera	Free Transfer	25 June 2025	
15	MF	(Brazil) Van Basty Sousa e Silva	(Brazil) Clube Náutico Capibaribe	Free Transfer	1 July 2025	
73	FW	(Indonesia) Sandi Arta Samosir	(Indonesia) Madura United F.C.	End of Loan	1 July 2025	
18	FW	(Indonesia) Jehan Pahlevi	(Indonesia) Persiku Kudus	End of Loan	1 July 2025	
11	MF	(Indonesia) Arlyansyah Abdulmanan	(Indonesia) PSIM Yogyakarta	End of Loan	1 July 2025	
28	MF	(Indonesia) Figo Dennis Saputrananto	(Indonesia) PSIM Yogyakarta	End of Loan	1 July 2025	
32	DF	(Indonesia) Dia Syayid Alhawari	(Indonesia) PSS Sleman	End of Loan	1 July 2025	
3	DF	(Indonesia) Muhammad Alwi Fadilah	(Indonesia) F.C. Bekasi City	End of Loan	1 July 2025	
29	DF	(Indonesia) Muhamamd Baihaqi Rifai	(Indonesia) Persikab Bandung	End of Loan	1 July 2025	
21	DF	(Indonesia) Jordi Amat Maas	(Malaysia) Johor Darul Ta'zim F.C.	Free Transfer	5 July 2025	
97	MF	(Brazil) Fábio Da Silva Calonego	(Brazil) Associação Desportiva Confiança	Undisclosed	9 July 2025	
10	MF	(Brazil) Gustavo França Amadio	(Brazil) Londrina Esporte Clube	Free Transfer	21 July 2025	
17	FW	(Brazil) Allano Brendon de Souza Lima	(Brazil) Operário Ferroviário Esporte Clube	TBA	26 July 2025	
16	LB	(Brazil) Alan Cardoso de Andrade	(Brazil) Associação Desportiva Confiança	TBA	26 July 2025	
99	LW	(Brazil) Emaxwell Souza de Lima	(Brazil) Clube do Remo	TBA	5 August 2025	
88	LW	(Brazil) Bruno Nunes de Barros	(Brazil) Ceará Sporting Club	TBA	18 August 2025	

==== Second round ====
No.	Pos	Player	Transferred From	Fee	Date	Source
4	DF	(Indonesia) Muhammad Fajar Fathur Rahman	(Indonesia) Borneo Samarinda	Undisclosed	15 January 2026	
3	DF	(Brazil) Paulo Ricardo Ferreira	(Finland) KuPS	Undisclosed	21 January 2026	
25	DF	(Indonesia) Shayne Elian Jay Pattynama	(Thailand) Buriram United	Undisclosed	23 January 2026	
9	FW	(Indonesia) Mauro Nils Zijlstra	(Netherlands) FC Volendam	Undisclosed	4 February 2026	
10	MF	(Brazil) Jean Mota Oliveira de Sousa	(Brazil) Vila Nova	Undisclosed	6 February 2026	
93	GK	(Indonesia) Cyrus Ashkon Margono	(Kosovo) KF Dukagjini	Undisclosed	6 February 2026	

=== Out ===
==== First round ====
No.	Pos	Player	Transferred To	Fee	Date	Source
11	LB	(Indonesia) Firza Andika	(Indonesia) Bhayangkara Presisi Lampung F.C.	End of Contract	10 May 2025	
9	CF	(Croatia) Marko Šimić	Free Agent	End of Contract	23 May 2025	
15	CB	(Czech Republic) Ondřej Kúdela	(Czech Republic) FK Viktoria Žižkov	End of Contract	23 May 2025	
10	AMF	(Poland) Maciej Jacek Gajos	(Poland) Wieczysta Kraków	End of Contract	23 May 2025	
6	CMF	(Spain) Ramón Bueno Gonzalbo	Free Agent	End of Contract	23 May 2025	
55	LB	(Brazil) Pablo Andrade	Free Agent	End of Contract	23 May 2025	
8	MF	(Indonesia) Syahrian Abimanyu	(Indonesia) Persik Kediri	End of Contract	23 May 2025	
41	CB	(Indonesia) Muhammad Ferarri	(Indonesia) Bhayangkara Presisi Lampung F.C.	End of Contract	23 May 2025	
24	MF	(Indonesia) Resky Fandi Witriawan	(Indonesia) PSM Makassar	End of Contract	23 May 2025	
15	RB	(Indonesia) Raka Cahyana Rizky	(Indonesia) PSIM Yogyakarta	End of Contract	5 June 2025	
33	CB	(Indonesia) Muhammad Akbar Arjunsyah	(Indonesia) Dewa United Banten F.C.	End of Contract	17 June 2025	
69	FW	(Indonesia) Yandi Sofyan Munawar	(Indonesia) Malut United F.C.	End of Loan	1 July 2025	
73	FW	(Indonesia) Sandi Arta Samosir	(Indonesia) Persiba Bantul	End of Contract	1 July 2025	
	DF	(Indonesia) Rayhan Utina	(Indonesia) Borneo Samarinda	End of Contract	1 July 2025	
	MF	(Indonesia) Ibnu Yazid	(Indonesia) Sriwijaya F.C.	End of Contract	1 July 2025	
	RW	(Indonesia) Risky Padilah	(Indonesia) Free Agent	End of Contract	1 July 2025	
	RW	(Indonesia) Qaqa Basham	(Indonesia) RANS Nusantara	End of Contract	1 July 2025	
	MF	(Indonesia) Fajar Firdaus	(Indonesia) Persiraja Banda Aceh	End of Contract	23 July 2025	
	MF	(Indonesia) Resa Aditya	(Indonesia) Pekanbaru F.C.	End of Contract	2 August 2025	

==== Second round ====
No.	Pos	Player	Transferred To	Fee	Date	Source
	MF	(Indonesia) Alwi Fadilah	(Indonesia) PSIS Semarang	End of Contract	2 January 2026	
10	MF	(Brazil) Gustavo França	(Indonesia) Arema FC	Contract Termination	18 January 2026	
16	DF	(Brazil) Alan Cardoso	(Indonesia) Bhayangkara Lampung	Contract Termination	27 January 2026	

=== Loan In ===
==== First Round ====
No.	Pos	Player	Loaned From	Start	End	Source
6	DF	(Brazil) Thales Natanael Lira de Matos	(Indonesia) Arema F.C.	27 July 2025	26 July 2026	

==== Second Round ====
No.	Pos	Player	Loaned From	Start	End	Source
41	FW	(Morocco) Alaaeddine Ajaraie	(India) NorthEast United FC	16 January 2026	End of Season	

=== Loan Out ===
==== First round ====
No.	Pos	Name	Loaned to	Start	End	Source
25	RW	(Indonesia) Riko Simanjuntak	(Indonesia) PSS Sleman	9 January 2025	30 June 2026	
	DF	(Indonesia) Meshaal Hamzah	(Indonesia) Deltras F.C.	12 September 2025	30 June 2026	
90	DF	(Indonesia) Fava Sheva	(Indonesia) Persiraja Banda Aceh	28 July 2025	30 June 2026	
	DF	(Indonesia) Ihsan Kusuma	(Indonesia) Persiraja Banda Aceh	23 July 2025	30 June 2026	
	DF	(Indonesia) Amirul Fisabilillah	(Indonesia) Deltras Sidoarjo	01 July 2025	30 June 2026	
80	GK	(Indonesia) Adre Arido	(Indonesia) Persibo Bojonegoro	1 September 2025	30 June 2026	
	DF	(Indonesia) Dani Ibrohim	(Indonesia) PSIS Semarang	11 September 2025	30 June 2026	
	MF	(Indonesia) Raditya Rahardjo	(Indonesia) Persikutim United	25 September 2025	30 June 2026	
	DF	(Indonesia) Farhan Sopiulloh	(Indonesia) Persikutim United	25 September 2025	30 June 2026	
	MF	(Indonesia) Refan Nadhif	(Indonesia) RANS Nusantara	5 October 2025	30 June 2026	

==== Second round ====
No.	Pos	Name	Loaned to	Start	End	Source
	DF	(Indonesia) Alfriyanto Nico Saputro	(Indonesia) Persis Solo	9 January 2026	30 June 2026	
	MF	(Indonesia) Figo Dennis	(Indonesia) PSS Sleman	9 January 2026	30 June 2026	
	FW	(Indonesia) Jehan Pahlevi	(Indonesia) PSS Sleman	9 January 2026	30 June 2026	
2	DF	(Indonesia) Ilham Rio Fahmi	(Indonesia) Arema Malang	31 January 2026	30 June 2026	
23	DF	(Indonesia) Hansamu Yama Pranata	(Indonesia) Arema Malang	31 January 2026	30 June 2026	
7	MF	(Japan) Ryo Matsumura	(Indonesia) Bhayangkara Presisi	10 February 2026	30 June 2026	

== Squad information ==
=== First team squad ===
No.	Name	Nat.	Date of Birth (Age)	Signed in	Contract until	Signed from	Transfer Fee	Notes
Goalkeepers
1	Carlos Eduardo Soares Mota	(Brazil)	24 February 1992 (age 34)	2024	21 June 2026	(Brazil) ABC Futebol Clube	TBA	Foreign Player
22	Muhamad Hafizh Rizkianur	(Indonesia)	8 August 2006 (age 20)	2024		(Indonesia) Persija Jakarta U-21	Free	Under-23 Player; Originally from Youth system
26	Andritany Ardhiyasa	(Indonesia)	26 December 1991 (age 34)	2010	30 June 2026	(Indonesia) Sriwijaya		Vice Captain
27	Irham Nadzofa Al Farih	(Indonesia)	11 February 2007 (age 19)	2025	TBA	(Indonesia) Persija Jakarta U-21	Promoted From Youth Team	Under-23 Player; Originally from Youth system
93	Cyrus Margono	(Indonesia)	9 November 2001 (age 25)	2026	TBA	(Kosovo) KF Dukagjini	TBA	Mid-season Transfer
Defenders
3	Paulo Ricardo	(Brazil)	13 June 1994 (age 32)	2026	31 May2026	(Finland) KuPS	Free	Foreign Player
4	Fajar Fathur Rahman	(Indonesia)	29 May 2002 (age 24)	2026	30 June 2029	(Indonesia) Borneo Samarinda	TBA	Mid-season Transfer
5	Rizky Ridho Ramadhani	(Indonesia)	21 November 2001 (age 24)	2023	30 June 2026	(Indonesia) Persebaya Surabaya	Free	Captain
6	Thales Natanael Lira de Matos	(Brazil)	6 April 1993 (age 33)	2025	30 June 2026	(Indonesia) Arema F.C.	On Loan	Foreign Player
21	Jordi Amat Maas	(Indonesia)	21 March 1992 (age 34)	2025	31 May 2027	(Malaysia) Johor Darul Ta'zim F.C.	Free	Naturalized Player
25	Shayne Pattynama	(Indonesia)	11 August 1998 (age 28)	2026	30 June 2028	(Thailand) Buriram United	TBA	Naturalized Player
29	Muhammad Baihaqi Rifai	(Indonesia)	29 July 2006 (age 20)	2025	TBA	(Indonesia) Persija Jakarta U-21	Promoted From Youth Team	Under-23 player Originally from Youth system
32	Dia Syayid Alhawari	(Indonesia)	12 December 2004 (age 21)	2024	TBA	(Indonesia) Persija Jakarta U-21	End of loan 2025	Under-23 player Originally from Youth system
Midfielders
8	Witan Sulaeman	(Indonesia)	8 October 2001 (age 25)	2023	31 May 2026	(Indonesia) Bhayangkara F.C.	End of loan 2024	
10	Jean Mota	(Brazil)	15 October 1993 (age 33)	2026	31 May 2026	(Brazil) Vila Nova		Foreign Player
11	Arlyansyah Abdulmanan	(Indonesia)	20 December 2005 (age 20)	2025	TBA	(Indonesia) Persija Jakarta U-21	Promoted from youth team	Under-23 player Originally from Youth system
15	Van Basty Sousa e Silva	(Brazil)	27 November 1994 (age 31)	2025	30 June 2026	(Brazil) Clube Náutico Capibaribe		Foreign Player
19	Hanif Abdurrauf Sjahbandi	(Indonesia)	7 April 1997 (age 29)	2022	24 June 2027	(Indonesia) Arema F.C.	Free	
36	Aditya Warman	(Indonesia)	6 March 2004 (age 22)	2021	28 May 2028	(Indonesia) Sriwijaya F.C.	Free	Under-23 player Originally from Youth system
58	Muhammad Rayhan Hannan	(Indonesia)	2 April 2004 (age 22)	2023	30 June 2026	(Indonesia) Persija Jakarta U-21	Free	Under-23 Player; Originally from Youth system
77	Dony Tri Pamungkas	(Indonesia)	11 January 2005 (age 21)	2021	28 May 2028	(Indonesia) Persija Jakarta U-21	Free	Under-23 Player; Originally from Youth system
97	Fábio da Silva Calonego	(Brazil)	24 July 1997 (age 29)	2025	30 June 2026	(Brazil) Associação Desportiva Confiança		Foreign Player
Forwards
9	Mauro Zijlstra	(Indonesia)	9 November 2004 (age 22)	2026		(Netherlands) FC Volendam		Mid-season Transfer
17	Allano Brendon de Souza Lima	(Brazil)	24 April 1995 (age 31)	2025		(Brazil) Operário Ferroviário Esporte Clube		Foreign Player
41	Alaaeddine Ajaraie	(Morocco)	5 January 1993 (age 33)	2026	30 June 2026	(India) NorthEast United FC	On Loan	Foreign Player
66	Muhamad Zahaby Gholy	(Indonesia)	5 December 2008 (age 17)	2024		(Indonesia) Persija Jakarta U-21	Free	Under-23 Player; Originally from Youth system
70	Gustavo Almeida dos Santos	(Brazil)	25 July 1996 (age 30)	2023	3 June 2027	(Indonesia) Arema F.C.		Foreign Player
88	Bruno Nunes de Barros	(Brazil)	5 March 1995 (age 31)	2025		(Brazil) Ceará Sporting Club		Foreign Player
98	Eksel Timothy Joseph Runtukahu	(Indonesia)	2 September 1998 (age 28)	2025	30 June 2026	(Indonesia) PS Barito Putera	Free	
99	Emaxwell Souza de Lima	(Brazil)	11 February 1995 (age 31)	2025		(Brazil) Clube do Remo		Foreign Player

== Pre-season ==
Win Draw Loss

=== Friendly Matches ===
12 July 2025 Friendly Match	Persija Jakarta	1–0	Persiku Kudus	North Jakarta, Jakarta
15:30 UTC+7	R. Padilah 2'			Stadium: Jakarta International Stadium Training Field; Attendance: 0

19 July 2025 Friendly Match	Persija Jakarta	0–0	Adhyaksa F.C. Banten
15:30 UTC+7				Attendance: 0

26 July 2025 Persija Matchday 2025	Persija Jakarta	3–0	Arema F.C.	North Jakarta, Jakarta
19:50 UTC+7	Eksel Jr 31', 58'; G. França 62'	Report		Stadium: Jakarta International Stadium; Referee: Gideon F. Dapaherang (East Jakarta)

== Competitions ==
=== Overview ===
Competition	First match	Last match	Starting round	Final position	Record							
Competition	First match	Last match	Starting round	Final position	Pld	W	D	L	GF	GA	GD	Win %
Indonesia Super League	10 August 2025	23 May 2026	Matchday 1	3rd	34	22	5	7	65	29	+36	64.71
Total					34	22	5	7	65	29	+36	64.71

Source: Competitions

=== Indonesia Super League ===

Persija XI BRI Super League 2025–26

==== League table ====
Pos	Team	Pld	W	D	L	GF	GA	GD	Pts	Qualification or relegation
1	Persib (C)	34	24	7	3	59	22	+37	79 (Note: Head-to-head points: Persib 4, Borneo Samarinda 1.)	Qualification for the 2026–27 AFC Champions League Two play-offs and 2026–27 ASEAN Club Championship group stage
2	Borneo Samarinda	34	25	4	5	74	31	+43	79	Qualification for the 2026–27 AFC Challenge League and 2026–27 ASEAN Club Championship group stage
3	Persija	34	22	5	7	65	29	+36	71	
4	Persebaya	34	16	10	8	61	35	+26	58	
5	Bhayangkara Presisi	34	16	5	13	53	45	+8	53 (Note: Head-to-head points: Bhayangkara Presisi 9, Malut United 6, Dewa United Banten 3.)	

Source: Super League 2025–26
Rules for classification: 1) Points; 2) Head-to-head points; 3) Head-to-head goal difference; 4) Head-to-head goals scored; 5) Goal difference; 6) Goals scored; 7) Fair-play points; 8) Draw.
(C) Champions

==== Results summary ====
Overall								Home						Away					
Pld	W	D	L	GF	GA	GD	Pts	W	D	L	GF	GA	GD	W	D	L	GF	GA	GD
34	22	5	7	65	29	+36	71	11	4	2	37	12	+25	11	1	5	28	17	+11

Last updated: 27 May 2026.
Source: Competitive matches

==== Results by matchday ====
Matchday	1	2	3	4	5	6	7	8	9	10	11	12	13	14	15	16	17	18	19	20	21	22	23	24	25	26	27	28	29	30	31	32	33	34
Ground	H	A	H	A	H	A	A	H	A	A	H	A	H	H	A	H	A	H	A	H	A	H	A	H	H	A	H	A	A	H	A	H	A	H
Result	W	W	D	W	D	L	L	W	W	W	W	W	W	W	L	W	L	W	W	L	W	W	W	D	D	L	W	W	D	W	W	L	W	W
Position	1	1	2	1	2	2	3	3	3	2	2	2	2	3	3	2	3	3	3	3	3	2	2	2	3	3	3	3	3	3	3	3	3	3

Updated to match(es) played on 22 November 2025. Source: Matches
A = Away; H = Home; W = Win; D = Draw; L = Loss; P = Postponed

==== Score overview ====
Win Draw Loss

Opposition	Home score	Away score	Aggregate score	Double
Arema F.C.	0–2	2–1	2–3	No
Bali United F.C.	1–1	1–0	2–1	Yes
Bhayangkara Presisi Lampung F.C.	3–0	2–3	5–3	Yes
Borneo F.C. Samarinda	2–2	1–3	3–5	No
Dewa United F.C.	1–1	3–1	4–2	Yes
Madura United F.C.	2–0	1–0	3–0	Yes
Malut United F.C.	1–1	3–2	4–3	Yes
Persebaya Surabaya	3–0	3–1	6–1	Yes
Persib Bandung	1–2	0–1	1–3	No
Persijap Jepara	2–0	2–0	4–0	Yes
Persik Kediri	3–1	3–1	6–2	Yes
Persis Solo	4–0	3–0	7–0	Yes
Persita Tangerang	4–0	2–0	6–0	Yes
PSBS Biak	3–1	1–0	4–1	Yes
PSIM Yogyakarta	2–0	1–1	3–1	Yes
PSM Makassar	2–1	0–2	2–3	No
Semen Padang F.C.	3–0	0–1	3–1	Yes

==== Matches ====
Win Draw Loss

===== First round =====
10 August 2025 1	Persija Jakarta	4–0	Persita Tangerang	North Jakarta, Jakarta
19:00 UTC+7	R. Ridho 31'; Allano 70', 90+1'; Emaxwell 72'	Report (LIB); Report (ILMS)		Stadium: Jakarta International Stadium; Attendance: 29,153; Referee: Candra (Padang)

16 August 2025 2	Persis Solo	0–3	Persija Jakarta	Surakarta, Central Java
19:00 UTC+7		Report (LIB); Report (LIBMS)	G. França 45+1'; Emaxwell 62'; Eksel Jr. 90+3'	Stadium: Manahan Stadium; Attendance: 13,980; Referee: Asep Yandis (Karawang)

23 August 2025 3	Persija Jakarta	1–1	Malut United F.C.	North Jakarta, Jakarta
15:30 UTC+7	Emaxwell 82'	Report (LIB); Report (LIBMS)	Yance S. 72'	Stadium: Jakarta International Stadium; Attendance: 22,195; Referee: Rio Permana Putra (Pekanbaru)

29 August 2025 4	Dewa United Banten F.C.	1–3	Persija Jakarta	Pabuaran, Serang Regency, Banten
19:00 UTC+7	Messidoro 50'	Report (LIB); Report (LIBMS)	Emaxwell 30'; Van Basty 63'; Allano 90+4'	Stadium: Banten International Stadium; Attendance: 0 Referee: Thoriq Munir Alkatiri (Bandung)

14 September 2025 5	Persija Jakarta	1–1	Bali United F.C.	North Jakarta, Jakarta
19:00 UTC+7	Tubarão 56'	Report (LIB); Report (LIBMS)	Mustafić 18'	Stadium: Jakarta International Stadium; Attendance: 29,389; Referee: Yudi Nurcahya (Bandung)

21 September 2025 6	PSM Makassar	2–0	Persija Jakarta	Parepare, South Sulawesi
20:00 UTC+8	Sávio 56'; Kamara 79'	Report (LIB); Report (LIBMS)		Stadium: Gelora B.J. Habibie Stadium; Attendance: 6,116; Referee: Sance Lawita (Manado)

28 September 2025 7	Borneo F.C. Samarinda	3–1	Persija Jakarta	Samarinda, East Kalimantan
20:00 UTC+8	Vinícius 45'; Kei 55'; Coutinho 90'	Report (LIB); Report (LIBMS)	G. Almeida 90+8'	Stadium: Segiri Stadium; Attendance: 9,996; Referee: Nendi Rohaendi (Bandung)

2 October 2025 8	Persija Jakarta	P–P	Bhayangkara Presisi Lampung F.C.	Bekasi, West Java
19:00 UTC+7		[Report (LIB)] [Report (LIBMS)]		Stadium: Patriot Chandrabhaga Stadium
Note: Persija Jakarta hosted Bhayangkara Presisi Lampung F.C. at Patriot Chandrabhaga Stadium on October 2nd for preparing Indonesia national football team for 2026 FIFA World Cup Qualification 4th Round Asian Zone.

18 October 2025 9	Persebaya Surabaya	1–3	Persija Jakarta	Surabaya, East Java
19:00 UTC+7	Lelis 77'	Report (LIB) (LIBMS)	Dony 21'; Jordi 45+3'; Allano (yellow card) 27' (goal) 74' (pen.)	Stadium: Gelora Bung Tomo Stadium; Referee: Irfan Wahyu Wijanarko (Kulon Progo)

24 October 2025 10	Madura United F.C.	0–1	Persija Jakarta	Tlanakan, Pamekasan Regency, East Java
19:00 UTC+7		Report (LIB); Report (LIBMS)	Emaxwell 37'	Stadium: Gelora Ratu Pamelingan Stadium; Attendance: 3,197; Referee: Sance Lawita (Manado)

31 October 2025 11	Persija Jakarta	3–1	PSBS Biak	Surakarta, Central Java
19:00 UTC+7	Emaxwell 17' (pen.), 61', 90+2'	Report (LIB); Report (LIBMS)	Andrade 40'	Stadium: Manahan Stadium; Attendance: 0 Referee: Thoriq Munir Alkatiri (Bandung)

8 November 2025 12	Arema F.C.	1–2	Persija Jakarta	Kepanjen, Malang Regency, East Java
15:30 UTC+7	Valdeci 12'	Report (LIB); Report (LIBMS)	Eksel JR 48', 50'	Stadium: Kanjuruhan Stadium; Attendance: 10,314; Referee: Yudi Nurcahya (Bandung)

20 November 2025 13	Persija Jakarta	3–1	Persik Kediri	Surakarta, Central Java
19:00 UTC+7	Eksel JR 60'; Emaxwell 71'; Witan 78'	Report (LIB); Report (LIBMS)	Ezra 42'	Stadium: Manahan Stadium; Attendance: 5,126; Referee: Ginanjar Rahman Latief (Soreang)

28 November 2025 14	Persija Jakarta	2–0	PSIM Yogyakarta	Central Jakarta, Jakarta
19:00 UTC+7	Van Basty (yellow card) 10'; Emaxwell 77' (yellow card) 90+6'; Allano 90+5'; Arlyansyah (yellow card) 90+6'	Report (LIB); Report (LIBMS)	Reva Adi (yellow card) 36'; Anton Fase (yellow card) 64'	Stadium: Gelora Bung Karno Stadium; Attendance: 56,150; Referee: Candra (Padang)

22 December 2025 15	Semen Padang F.C.	1–0	Persija Jakarta	Padang, West Sumatera
19:00 UTC+7	Jordi 83' (o.g.)	Report (LIB); Report (LIBMS)		Stadium: Gelora Haji Agus Salim Stadium; Attendance: 6,214; Referee: Steven Yubel Poli (Manado)

29 December 2025 8 (Replacement Match)	Persija Jakarta	3–0	Bhayangkara Presisi Lampung F.C.	Central Jakarta, Jakarta
19:00 UTC+7	Allano 45+1' (pen.); Putu Gede 62' (o.g.); Jordi 78'	Report (LIB); Report (LIBMS)		Stadium: Gelora Bung Karno Stadium; Attendance: 15,317; Referee: Thoriq Munir Alkatiri (Bandung)

3 January 2026 16	Persija Jakarta	2–0	Persijap Jepara	Central Jakarta, Jakarta
15:30 UTC+7	Arlyansyah 61'; Warman 79'	Report (LIB); Report (LIBMS)		Stadium: Gelora Bung Karno Stadium; Attendance: 26,113; Referee: Rio Permana Putra (Pekanbaru)

11 January 2026 17	Persib Bandung	1–0	Persija Jakarta	Bandung, West Java
15:30 UTC+7	Beckham 5'; Haye (yellow card) 34'; Eliano (yellow card) 74'; Klok (yellow card) 79'; Berguinho (yellow card) 87'	Report (LIB) (LIBMS)	Allano (yellow card) 29'; Tubarão (red card); Witan (yellow card) 82'	Stadium: Gelora Bandung Lautan Api Stadium; Attendance: 29,616; Referee: Ko Hyung-jin (Seoul, South Korea)

===== Second round =====
23 January 2026 18	Persija Jakarta	2–0	Madura United F.C.	Central Jakarta, Jakarta
19:00 UTC+7	Gustavo 44' (pen.); Hannan (yellow card) 74'; Arlyansyah (yellow card) 90+6'; Emaxwell 90+15' (pen.)	(LIB) (LIBMS)	Palić (yellow card) 43'; Ilhamsyah (yellow card) 56'; Ruxi (yellow card) 67'; Diky (yellow card) 90+9'	Stadium: Gelora Bung Karno Stadium; Attendance: 9,237; Referee: Yudai Yamamoto (Japan)

30 January 2026 19	Persita Tangerang	0–2	Persija Jakarta	Kelapa Dua, Tangerang Regency, Banten
15:30 UTC+7	Eber (yellow card) 13'; Matheus (yellow card) 45'; Javlon (yellow card) 84'; Zalnando (yellow card) 90'	(LIB) (LIBMS)	Rio Fahmi (yellow card) 17'; Gustavo 33'; Amat (yellow card) 41'; Aditya (yellow card) 45+4'; Emaxwell 50'; Allano (yellow card) 90'	Stadium: Indomilk Arena; Attendance: 8,735; Referee: Steven Yubel Poli

8 February 2026 20	Persija Jakarta	0–2	Arema F.C.	Central Jakarta, Jakarta
19:00 UTC+7	Ridho (yellow card) 41'	(LIB) (LIBMS)	Vinícius (yellow card) 63'; Adi Satryo (yellow card) 70'; Gabriel 82', 90+11'; Jayus (yellow card) 89'; Rio Fahmi (yellow card) 90+2'	Stadium: Gelora Bung Karno Stadium; Attendance: 56,989; Referee: Thoriq Alkatiri

15 February 2026 21	Bali United F.C.	0–1	Persija Jakarta	Blahbatuh, Gianyar Regency, Bali
20:00 UTC+8	Rizky Dwi (yellow card) 43'	(LIB) (LIBMS)	Gustavo 8'; Dony Tri (yellow card) 28'; Ridho (yellow card) 71'; Thales (yellow card) 90+6'	Stadium: Kapten I Wayan Dipta Stadium; Attendance: 9,811; Referee: Rio Permana Putra

20 February 2026 22	Persija Jakarta	2–1	PSM Makassar	North Jakarta, Jakarta
20:30 UTC+7	Alaaeddine 30'; Allano (yellow card) 63'; Emaxwell 67'; Van Basty (yellow card) 87'	(LIB) (LIBMS)	Sheriddin 37'; Rizky (yellow card) 42'; Gledson (yellow card) 45'; Neto (yellow card) 60'	Stadium: Jakarta International Stadium; Attendance: 8,940; Referee: Agung Setiawan

25 February 2026 23	Malut United F.C.	2–3	Persija Jakarta	Ternate, North Maluku
21:00 UTC+9	Wbeymar (yellow card) 49'; Igor (yellow card) 50'; Ciro 78'; da Silva 82'	(LIB) (LIBMS)	Alaaeddine 8'; Amat 29' (yellow card) 55'; Allano (yellow card) 57'; Aditya (yellow card) 70' (yellow-red card) 90'; Fábio 80'	Stadium: Gelora Kie Raha Stadium; Attendance: 4,332; Referee: Sance Lawita

3 March 2026 24	Persija Jakarta	2–2	Borneo F.C. Samarinda	North Jakarta, Jakarta
20:30 UTC+7	Donny Tri (yellow card) 38'; Amat (yellow card) 45+1'; Gustavo 47'; Ridho (yellow card) 48'; Thales (yellow card) 57'; Fábio (yellow card) 58' (goal) 75'; Allano (yellow card) 87'	(LIB) (LIBMS)	Peralta (yellow card) 43'; Villa 62'; Buffon (yellow card) 43'; Ikhsan (yellow card) 90+3' (goal) 90+4'	Stadium: Jakarta International Stadium; Attendance: 19,709; Referee: Agung Setiawan

15 March 2026 25	Persija Jakarta	1–1	Dewa United Banten F.C.	North Jakarta, Jakarta
20:30 UTC+7	Emaxwell (yellow card) 21' (goal) 45+4'; Tubarão (yellow card) 26'	(LIB) (LIBMS)	Lowe (yellow card) 21'; Messidoro 55'; Jajá (yellow card) 56'; Kambuaya (yellow card) 87'	Stadium: Jakarta International Stadium; Attendance: 19,555; Referee: Naufal Adya Fairuski

5 April 2026 26	Bhayangkara Presisi Lampung F.C.	3–2	Persija Jakarta	Bandar Lampung, Lampung
15:30 UTC+7	Sidibé 28' 90+3'; Missa (yellow card) 44'; Yamamoto (yellow card) 69'; Sadiki (yellow card) 74'; Dendy 86'	(LIB) (LIBMS)	Hannan 1'; Amat (yellow card) 45+2' (yellow-red card) 48'; Thales (yellow card) 56'; Fábio 63'; Alaaeddine (yellow card) 90+2'	Stadium: Sumpah Pemuda Stadium; Attendance: 6,907; Referee: Nendi Rohaendy

11 April 2026 27	Persija Jakarta	3–0	Persebaya Surabaya	Central Jakarta, Jakarta
19:00 UTC+7	Allano 17' (pen.) (yellow card) 57'; Emaxwell (yellow card) 37'; Eksel 54' (yellow card) 54' (goal) 76'	(LIB) (LIBMS)	Catur (yellow card) 34'; Jefferson (yellow card) 90+4'	Stadium: Gelora Bung Karno Stadium; Attendance: 39,443; Referee: Candra

18 April 2026 28	PSBS Biak	0–1	Persija Jakarta	Sleman Regency, Special Region of Yogyakarta
19:00 UTC+7		[Report (LIB)] [Report (LIBMS)]		Stadium: Maguwoharjo Stadium

22 April 2026 29	PSIM Yogyakarta	1–1	Persija Jakarta	Gianyar, Bali
15:30 UTC+7	Vidal 4' (yellow card) 61'; Warmerdam (yellow card) 18'; Yamadera (yellow card) 40'; Iqbal (yellow card) 62'; Raka (yellow card) 86'; Abiyoso (yellow card) 90+3'	(LIB) (LIBMS)	Allano 20' (pen.); Dony (yellow card) 65'	Stadium: Kapten I Wayan Dipta Stadium

27 April 2026 30	Persija Jakarta	4–0	Persis Solo	Central Jakarta, Jakarta
19:00 UTC+7	Ricardo (yellow card) 51' (goal) 81'; Allano 52'; Mota 63'; Gustavo 90+1'	(LIB) (LIBMS)		Stadium: Gelora Bung Karno Stadium; Attendance: 12,827; Referee: Candra

3 May 2026 31	Persijap Jepara	0–2	Persija Jakarta	Jepara, Central Java
19:00 UTC+7	Borja (yellow card) 56'; Guarrotxena (yellow card) 60'; Ndom (yellow card) 80'; Tiri (yellow card) 90+11'	(LIB) (LIBMS)	Eksel (yellow card) 8'; Pattynama (yellow card) 56'; Alaaeddine (yellow card) 61'; Hannan 64'; Cyrus (yellow card) 90+4'; Gustavo 90+8'	Stadium: Gelora Bumi Kartini Stadium; Attendance: 1988; Referee: Agung Setyawan

10 May 2026 32	Persija Jakarta	1–2	Persib Bandung	Samarinda, East Kalimantan
19:00 UTC+7		[Report (LIB)] [Report (LIBMS)]		Stadium: Segiri Stadium (Note: Persija did not receive a security permit from the police to hold the match against Persib in Java.)

16 May 2026 33	Persik Kediri	1–3	Persija Jakarta	Kediri, East Java
19:00 UTC+7		[Report (LIB)] [Report (LIBMS)]		Stadium: Brawijaya Stadium

23 May 2026 34	Persija Jakarta	3–0	Semen Padang F.C.	North Jakarta, Jakarta
TBA		[Report (LIB)] [Report (LIBMS)]		Stadium: Jakarta International Stadium

== Statistics ==
=== Squad appearances and goals ===
Last updated on 21 February 2026

No.	Pos	Nat	Player	Total		Super League		Piala Indonesia	
No.	Pos	Nat	Player	Apps	Goals	Apps	Goals	Apps	Goals
Goalkeepers
1	GK	(Brazil) BRA	Carlos Eduardo Soares Mota	20	0	20	0	0	0
22	GK	(Indonesia) IDN	Muhamad Hafizh Rizkianur	0	0	0	0	0	0
26	GK	(Indonesia) IDN	Andritany Ardhiyasa	9	0	9	0	0	0
27	GK	(Indonesia) IDN	Irham Nadzofa Al Farih	0	0	0	0	0	0
93	GK	(Indonesia) IDN	Cyrus Margono	1	0	1	0	0	0
Defenders
3	DF	(Brazil) BRA	Paulo Ricardo Ferreira	7	1	5+2	1	0	0
4	DF	(Indonesia) IDN	Fajar Fathur Rahman	11	0	1+10	0	0	0
5	DF	(Indonesia) IDN	Rizky Ridho Ramadhani	28	1	28	1	0	0
6	DF	(Brazil) BRA	Thales Natanael Lira de Matos	20	0	15+5	0	0	0
21	DF	(Indonesia) IDN	Jordi Amat Maas	26	3	24+2	3	0	0
25	DF	(Indonesia) IDN	Shayne Elian Jay Pattynama	7	0	0+7	0	0	0
29	DF	(Indonesia) IDN	Muhammad Baihaqi Rifai	0	0	0	0	0	0
32	DF	(Indonesia) IDN	Dia Syayid Alhawari	1	0	0+1	0	0	0
77	DF	(Indonesia) IDN	Dony Tri Pamungkas	23	1	21+2	1	0	0
Midfielders
8	MF	(Indonesia) IDN	Witan Sulaeman	15	1	7+8	1	0	0
10	MF	(Brazil) BRA	Jean Mota	1	0	0+1	0	0	0
11	MF	(Indonesia) IDN	Arlyansyah Abdulmanan	10	1	4+6	1	0	0
15	MF	(Brazil) BRA	Van Basty Sousa e Silva	18	1	16+2	1	0	0
19	MF	(Indonesia) IDN	Hanif Abdurrauf Sjahbandi	11	0	4+7	0	0	0
24	MF	(Indonesia) IDN	Raditya Yugie Rahardjo	0	0	0	0	0	0
36	MF	(Indonesia) IDN	Aditya Warman	9	1	4+5	1	0	0
58	MF	(Indonesia) IDN	Muhammad Rayhan Hannan	7	0	3+4	0	0	0
97	MF	(Brazil) BRA	Fábio Da Silva Calonego	19	0	19	0	0	0
Forwards
9	FW	(Indonesia) IDN	Mauro Zijlstra	2	0	0+2	0	0	0
17	FW	(Brazil) BRA	Allano Brendon de Souza Lima	19	6	19	6	0	0
41	FW	(Morocco) MAR	Alaaeddine Ajaraie	5	1	3+2	1	0	0
66	FW	(Indonesia) IDN	Muhamad Zahaby Gholy	0	0	0	0	0	0
70	FW	(Brazil) BRA	Gustavo Almeida dos Santos	10	4	8+2	4	0	0
88	FW	(Brazil) BRA	Bruno Nunes de Barros	16	1	13+3	1	0	0
98	FW	(Indonesia) IDN	Eksel Timothy Joseph Runtukahu	15	4	9+6	4	0	0
99	FW	(Brazil) BRA	Emaxwell Souza de Lima	21	13	19+2	13	0	0
Players departed during the season
2	DF	(Indonesia) IDN	Ilham Rio Fahmi	16	0	10+6	0	0	0
3	DF	(Indonesia) IDN	Muhamad Alwi Fadillah	1	0	0+1	0	0	0
7	MF	(Japan) JPN	Ryo Matsumura	1	0	0+1	0	0	0
10	MF	(Brazil) BRA	Gustavo França Amadio	13	1	7+6	1	0	0
13	DF	(Indonesia) IDN	Muhammad Dani Ibrohim	0	0	0	0	0	0
16	DF	(Brazil) BRA	Alan Cardoso de Andrade	18	0	9+9	0	0	0
18	FW	(Indonesia) IDN	Jehan Pahlevi	1	0	0+1	0	0	0
23	DF	(Indonesia) IDN	Hansamu Yama Pranata	4	0	0+4	0	0	0
28	MF	(Indonesia) IDN	Figo Dennis Saputrananto	2	0	1+1	0	0	0
56	MF	(Indonesia) IDN	Alfriyanto Nico Saputro	5	0	2+3	0	0	0

Last updated: 21 February 2026.
Source: Soccerway

=== Top scorers ===
The list is sorted by shirt number when total goals are equal.

Rnk	Pos	No.	Player	Super League	Piala Indonesia	Total
1	FW	99	(Brazil) Emaxwell Souza de Lima	11	0	10
2	FW	17	(Brazil) Allano Brendon de Souza Lima	6	0	6
3	FW	98	(Indonesia) Eksel Timothy Joseph Runtukahu	4	0	4
4	DF	21	(Indonesia) Jordi Amat Maas	2	0	2
5	FW	70	(Brazil) Gustavo Almeida dos Santos	2	0	2
6	DF	5	(Indonesia) Rizky Ridho Ramadhani	1	0	1
6	MF	8	(Indonesia) Witan Sulaeman	1	0	1
6	MF	11	(Indonesia) Arlyansyah Abdulmanan	1	0	1
6	MF	10	(Brazil) Gustavo França Amadio	1	0	1
6	MF	15	(Brazil) Van Basty Sousa e Silva	1	0	1
6	MF	36	(Indonesia) Aditya Warman	1	0	1
6	DF	77	(Indonesia) Dony Tri Pamungkas	1	0	1
6	FW	88	(Brazil) Bruno Nunes de Barros	1	0	1
Total				31	0	31

Last updated: 11 January 2026.
Source: Soccerway

=== Top assist ===
The list is sorted by shirt number when total assists are equal.

Rnk	Pos	No.	Player	Super League	Piala Indonesia	Total
1	MF	19	(Indonesia) Hanif Abdurrauf Sjahbandi	2	0	2
1	MF	15	(Brazil) Van Basty Sousa e Silva	2	0	2
2	MF	10	(Brazil) Gustavo França Amadio	1	0	1
2	MF	11	(Indonesia) Arlyansyah Abdulmanan	1	0	1
2	MF	8	(Indonesia) Witan Sulaeman	1	0	1
2	MF	56	(Indonesia) Alfriyanto Nico Saputro	1	0	1
2	FW	17	(Brazil) Allano Brendon de Souza Lima	1	0	1
Total				9	0	9

Last updated: 17 October 2025.

=== Clean sheets ===
The list is sorted by shirt number when total clean sheets are equal.

Rnk	No.	Player	Super League	Piala Indonesia	Total
1	1	(Brazil) Carlos Eduardo Soares Mota	2	0	2
Total			2	0	2

Last updated: 17 October 2025.
Source: Soccerway

=== Disciplinary record ===
Includes all competitive matches. Players listed below made at least one appearance for Persija Jakarta first squad during the season.

Rnk	Pos.	No.	Nat.	Name	Super League			Piala Indonesia			Total			Disciplinary Points	Notes
Rnk	Pos.	No.	Nat.	Name	Yellow card	Second yellow card	Red card	Yellow card	Second yellow card	Red card	Yellow card	Second yellow card	Red card	Disciplinary Points	Notes
1	FW	17	(Brazil)	Allano Brendon de Souza Lima	1	1	0	0	0	0	1	1	0	4	
2	DF	2	(Indonesia)	Ilham Rio Fahmi	0	1	0	0	0	0	0	1	0	3	
2	DF	16	(Brazil)	Alan Cardoso de Andrade	3	0	0	0	0	0	3	0	0	3	
2	DF	5	(Indonesia)	Rizky Ridho Ramadhani	3	0	0	0	0	0	3	0	0	3	
3	MF	15	(Brazil)	Van Basty Sousa e Silva	2	0	0	0	0	0	2	0	0	2	
3	MF	97	(Brazil)	Fábio da Silva Calonego	2	0	0	0	0	0	2	0	0	2	
4	Head Coach	–	(Brazil)	Maurício Ferreira de Souza	1	0	0	0	0	0	1	0	0	1	
4	DF	21	(Indonesia)	Jordi Amat Maas	1	0	0	0	0	0	1	0	0	1	
4	FW	70	(Brazil)	Gustavo Almeida dos Santos	1	0	0	0	0	0	1	0	0	1	

Last updated: 17 October 2025
Source: Competitions
Only competitive matches
(yellow card) = Number of bookings; (second yellow card) = Number of sending offs after a second yellow card; (red card) = Number of sending offs by a direct red card.
