= 2026–27 Persija Jakarta season =

Persija Jakarta
2026–27 season
- Owner: PT Persija Jaya Jakarta
- Director: Mohamad Prapanca
- Head Coach: (South Korea) Shin Tae-yong
- Stadium: Jakarta International Stadium; Gelora Bung Karno Main Stadium
Home colours	Away colours	Third colours

The 2026–27 season is Persija Jakarta's 93rd competitive season. They have not been relegated since the Perserikatan competition started in 1933. This season is Persija's 32nd consecutive seasons in top-flight since professional competition formed on 1994.

This is Persija's first season under new head coach Shin Tae-yong, who was named as Maurício Souza's successor on 8 June 2026.

== Coaching staff ==
Position	Staff
Manager	(Indonesia) Ardhi Tjahjoko
Head Coach	(South Korea) Shin Tae-yong
Assistant Head Coach	(South Korea) Cho Byung-kuk
Assistant Head Coach	(South Korea) Choi In-chul
Assistant Head Coach	(Indonesia) Maman Abdurahman
Assistant Head Coach	(Indonesia) Taji Prashetio
Assistant Head Coach	(Indonesia) Francis Wewengkang
Goalkeeper Coach	(South Korea) Yoo Jae-hoon
Fitness Coach	(South Korea) Huh Ji-sub
Fitness Coach	(South Korea) Hwang Ji-hwan
Head of Scouting	(South Korea) Kim Dong-ki
Video Analyst	(South Korea) Kim Jong-jin
Video Analyst	(Indonesia) Muhammad Fayyadh
Team Doctor	(Indonesia) Muhammad Andeansah
Masseur	(Indonesia) Aditya Julistiawan
Kitman	(Indonesia) Candra Darmawan
Kitman	(Indonesia) Aries Tri Kurniawan
Interpreter	(South Korea) Jeong Seok-seo

== Kits ==
Home	Away	Third	Goalkeeper 1	Goalkeeper 2	Goalkeeper 3	Goalkeeper 4 (Prematch)

== New contracts ==
No.	Pos	Player/Staff	Contract length	Contract end	Date	Source
58	MF	(Indonesia) Muhammad Rayhan Hannan	3 years	19 June 2029	19 June 2026	
32	DF	(Indonesia) Dia Syayid Alhawari	2 years	29 June 2028	29 June 2026	
98	FW	(Indonesia) Eksel Timothy Joseph Runtukahu	2 years	29 June 2028	29 June 2026	
8	MF	(Indonesia) Witan Sulaeman	3 years	4 July 2029	4 July 2026	
97	MF	(Brazil) Fábio da Silva Calonego	2 years	16 July 2028	16 July 2026	
22	GK	(Indonesia) Muhamad Hafizh Rizkianur	3 years	18 July 2029	18 July 2026	
26	GK	(Indonesia) Andritany Ardhiyasa	1 year	21 July 2027	21 July 2026	

== Transfers ==
Date	Position	No	Player	From	Fee	Ref
Pre-Season
27 June 2026	FW	7	(Indonesia) Victor Dethan	(Indonesia) PSM Makassar	Free Agent	
30 June 2026	GK	1	(Indonesia) Aqil Savik	(Indonesia) Bhayangkara Presisi	Free Agent	
6 July 2026	DF	18	(Indonesia) Pratama Arhan	(Thailand) Bangkok United	Free Agent	
9 July 2026	DF	50	(Bosnia and Herzegovina) Kerim Memija	(Bosnia and Herzegovina) HŠK Zrinjski Mostar	Undisclosed	
10 July 2026	DF	30	(Croatia) Denis Kolinger	(Croatia) Lokomotiva Zagreb	Free Agent	
14 July 2026	DF	6	(Serbia) Radovan Pankov	(Poland) Legia Warsaw	Free Agent	
14 July 2026	MF	44	(Japan) Kyohei Yoshino	(Japan) Cerezo Osaka	Undisclosed	
17 July 2026	MF	13	(South Korea) Kwon Chang-hoon	(South Korea) Jeju SK FC	Undisclosed	
18 July 2026	MF	33	(Bosnia and Herzegovina) Stjepan Lončar	(Croatia) NK Istra 1961	Undisclosed	
22 July 2026	GK	23	(Indonesia) Nadeo Argawinata	(Indonesia) Borneo Samarinda	Undisclosed	
21 August 2026	FW	9	(Sweden) Alexander Jeremejeff	(Greece) PAOK	Undisclosed	
10 September 2026	FW	17	(Croatia) Ivan Mamut	(Croatia) NK Varaždin	Undisclosed	
23 September 2026	MF	10	(Indonesia) Marselino Ferdinan	(England) Oxford United	Free Agent	
Mid-Season

=== Out ===
Date	Position	No	Player	To	Fee	Ref
Pre-Season
4 June 2026	GK	1	(Brazil) Carlos Eduardo	(Brazil) Grêmio Esportivo Brasil	End of Contract	
4 June 2026	MF	10	(Brazil) Jean Mota	(United States) Sporting JAX	End of Contract	
4 June 2026	FW	17	(Brazil) Allano Lima	(Indonesia) Bhayangkara Presisi	End of Contract	
4 June 2026	DF	88	(Brazil) Bruno Tubarão	(Brazil) Associação Chapecoense de Futebol	End of Contract	
4 June 2026	FW	99	(Brazil) Emaxwell Souza	(Brazil) Operário PR	End of Contract	
4 June 2026	DF	6	(Brazil) Thales Lira	(Indonesia) Arema F.C.	End of Loan	
4 June 2026	FW	41	(Morocco) Alaaeddine Ajaraie	(India) NorthEast United FC	End of Loan	
17 June 2026	MF	19	(Indonesia) Hanif Sjahbandi	(Indonesia) PSS Sleman	Mutual Termination	
17 June 2026	FW	25	(Indonesia) Riko Simanjuntak	(Indonesia) PSS Sleman	End of Contract	
17 June 2026	DF	23	(Indonesia) Hansamu Yama Pranata	(Indonesia) Arema F.C.	End of Contract	
17 June 2026	DF	56	(Indonesia) Alfriyanto Nico	(Indonesia) Garudayaksa F.C.	End of Contract	
11 July 2026	FW	7	(Japan) Ryo Matsumura	(Indonesia) Garudayaksa F.C.	End of Contract	
22 July 2026	MF	36	(Indonesia) Aditya Warman	(Indonesia) Borneo Samarinda	-	
24 August 2026	FW	70	(Brazil) Gustavo Almeida	(Indonesia) Java United F.C.	Mutual Termination	
Mid-Season

=== Loaned In ===
Date	Position	No	Player	From	Until	Ref
Pre-Season
Mid-Season

=== Loaned Out ===
Date	Position	No	Player	To	Until	Ref
Pre-Season
12 July 2026	MF		(Indonesia) Gabrieltus Alkevin	(Indonesia) Persis Solo	End of season	
12 July 2026	FW		(Indonesia) Ahmad Mujadid	(Indonesia) Persis Solo	End of season	
12 July 2026	FW		(Indonesia) Theodore Leeming	(Indonesia) Persis Solo	End of season	
12 July 2026	DF		(Indonesia) Oliver Leeming	(Indonesia) Persis Solo	End of season	
12 July 2026	MF		(Indonesia) Fandi Ahmad Muzaki	(Indonesia) Persis Solo	End of season	
23 July 2026	GK		(Indonesia) Cyrus Margono	(Indonesia) Java United	End of season	
22 August 2026	FW		(Indonesia) Mauro Zijlstra	(Indonesia) Arema Malang	End of season	
2 September 2026	MF		(Brazil) Van Basty Sousa	(Indonesia) Borneo Samarinda	End of season	
Mid-Season

== Squad information ==
=== First team squad ===
No.	Name	Nat.	Date of Birth (Age)	Signed in	Contract until	Signed from	Transfer Fee	Notes
Goalkeepers
1	Muchamad Aqil Savik	(Indonesia)	17 January 1999 (age 27)	2026	30 June 2027	(Indonesia) Bhayangkara F.C.		
22	Muhamad Hafizh Rizkianur	(Indonesia)	8 August 2006 (age 20)	2024	30 June 2029	(Indonesia) Persija Jakarta U-21		
23	Nadeo Argawinata	(Indonesia)	9 March 1997 (age 29)	2026	30 June 2031	(Indonesia) Borneo Samarinda		
26	Andritany Ardhiyasa	(Indonesia)	26 December 1991 (age 34)	2010	30 June 2027	(Indonesia) Sriwijaya		
Defenders
4	Fajar Fathur Rahman	(Indonesia)	29 May 2002 (age 24)	2026	30 June 2029	(Indonesia) Borneo Samarinda		
5	Rizky Ridho Ramadhani	(Indonesia)	21 November 2001 (age 25)	2023	30 June 2028	(Indonesia) Persebaya Surabaya		Captain
6	Radovan Pankov	(Serbia)	5 August 1995 (age 31)	2026	30 June 2028	(Poland) Legia Warsaw		
18	Patama Arhan Alif Rifai	(Indonesia)	21 December 2001 (age 24)	2026	30 June 2029	(Thailand) Bangkok United F.C.		
21	Jordi Amat Maas	(Indonesia)	21 March 1992 (age 34)	2025	31 May 2027	(Malaysia) Johor Darul Ta'zim F.C.		
25	Shayne Pattynama	(Indonesia)	11 August 1998 (age 28)	2026	30 June 2028	(Thailand) Buriram United		
30	Denis Kolinger	(Croatia)	14 January 1994 (age 32)	2026	30 June 2028	(Croatia) Lokomotiva Zagreb		
32	Dia Syayid Alhawari	(Indonesia)	12 December 2004 (age 21)	2024	TBA	(Indonesia) Persija Jakarta U-21		
50	Kerim Memija	(Bosnia and Herzegovina)	6 January 1996 (age 30)	2026	30 June 2028	(Bosnia and Herzegovina) Zrinjski Mostar		
77	Dony Tri Pamungkas	(Indonesia)	11 January 2005 (age 21)	2021	28 May 2028	(Indonesia) Persija Jakarta U-21		
Midfielders
8	Witan Sulaeman	(Indonesia)	8 October 2001 (age 25)	2023	31 May 2026	(Indonesia) Bhayangkara F.C.		
33	Stjepan Lončar	(Bosnia and Herzegovina)	10 November 1996 (age 30)	2026	30 June 2028	(Croatia) NK Istra 1961		
44	Kyohei Yoshino	(Japan)	8 November 1994 (age 32)	2026	30 June 2028	(Japan) Cerezo Osaka		
58	Muhammad Rayhan Hannan	(Indonesia)	2 April 2004 (age 22)	2023	30 June 2026	(Indonesia) Persija Jakarta U-21		
97	Fábio da Silva Calonego	(Brazil)	24 July 1997 (age 29)	2025	30 June 2026	(Brazil) Associação Desportiva Confiança		
Forwards
7	Victor Dethan	(Indonesia)	11 July 2004 (age 22)	2026	30 June 2028	(Indonesia) PSM Makassar		
9	Alexander Jeremejeff	(Sweden)	12 October 1993 (age 33)	2026	30 June 2028	(Greece) PAOK FC		
11	Arlyansyah Abdulmanan	(Indonesia)	20 December 2005 (age 20)	2025	TBA	(Indonesia) Persija Jakarta U-21		
13	Kwon Chang-hoon	(South Korea)	30 June 1994 (age 32)	2026	30 June 2028	(South Korea) Jeju SK FC		
17	Ivan Mamut	(Croatia)	30 April 1997 (age 29)	2026	30 June 2028	(Croatia) NK Varaždin		
98	Eksel Timothy Joseph Runtukahu	(Indonesia)	2 September 1998 (age 28)	2025	30 June 2026	(Indonesia) PS Barito Putera		

== Pre-season and friendlies ==
Win Draw Loss

=== 2026 Piala Presiden ===
==== Group B ====
Pos	Team	Pld	W	D	L	GF	GA	GD	Pts	Qualification
1	(Indonesia) Persebaya (H)	3	3	0	0	2	1	+1	9	Advance to the Semi-Final
2	(Indonesia) Persija	3	1	1	1	6	4	+2	4	Advance to the Semi-Final
3	(Thailand) Port	3	1	1	1	5	4	+1	4	
4	(Indonesia) PSMS	3	0	0	3	1	7	−6	0	

First match(es) will be played: 26 July 2026. Source: Piala Presiden 2026
Rules for classification: Tiebreakers
(H) Hosts

26 July 2026	Persebaya	1–0	Persija	Surabaya, East Java
19:30 UTC+7	Pankov 63' (o.g.)			Stadium: Gelora Bung Tomo Stadium; Attendance: 45,000; Referee: Thoriq Munir Alkatiri (Bandung)

29 July 2026	Port	2–2	Persija	Surabaya, East Java
15:30 UTC+7	Peeradol 18'; Al Sabhi 40'		Arlyansyah 42'; Lončar 52'	Stadium: Gelora Bung Tomo Stadium; Referee: Muhammad Nazmi Bin Nasaruddin (Penang, Malaysia)

1 August 2026	Persija	4–1	PSMS	Surabaya, East Java
15:30 UTC+7	Arlyansyah 22'; Dethan 80'; Calonego 84'; Gustavo 88'		Ikhsan Chan 58'	Stadium: Gelora Bung Tomo Stadium; Referee: Rio Permana Putra (Pekanbaru)

==== Semifinals ====
4 August 2026	Persib Bandung	2–1	Persija Jakarta	Gianyar, Bali
15:30 UTC+7			Kwon 86'	Stadium: Kapten I Wayan Dipta Stadium

==== Third place play-off ====
6 August 2026	Persija Jakarta	3–1	Arema F.C.	Gianyar, Bali
15:30 UTC+7	Witan 7'; Arlyansyah 73'; Dethan 87'			Stadium: Kapten I Wayan Dipta Stadium

=== Friendlies ===
19 August 2026	Police Tero F.C.	1–2	Persija Jakarta	Bangkok, Thailand
15:30 UTC+7			Hannan	Stadium: Alpine Football Camp

22 August 2026	Chiangrai United F.C.	1–2	Persija Jakarta	Bangkok, Thailand
15:30 UTC+7			Arlyansyah; Ridho	Stadium: Alpine Football Camp

29 August 2026	Persija Jakarta	4–0	Brisbane Roar FC	North Jakarta, Jakarta
15:30 UTC+7	Jeremejeff; Memija; Bility (o.g.)			Stadium: Jakarta International Stadium

== Competitions ==
=== Overview ===
Competition	First match	Last match	Starting round	Final position	Record							
Competition	First match	Last match	Starting round	Final position	Pld	W	D	L	GF	GA	GD	Win %
Indonesia Super League	4 September 2026	June 2027	Matchday 1	TBD	10	7	1	2	20	9	+11	70.00
Indonesia League Cup	3 November 2026	19 May 2027	Group stage	TBD	1	0	1	0	1	1	+0	0.00
Total					11	7	2	2	21	10	+11	63.64

Source: Competitions

=== Indonesia Super League ===
==== League table ====
Pos	Team	Pld	W	D	L	GF	GA	GD	Pts	Qualification or relegation
1	Persija	10	7	1	2	20	9	+11	22	Qualification for the 2027–28 AFC Champions League Two group stage
2	Dewa United Banten	10	6	2	2	16	13	+3	20	Qualification for the 2027–28 AFC Champions League Two play-offs
3	Bali United	9	6	1	2	26	9	+17	19	
4	Madura United	10	6	1	3	16	11	+5	19	
5	Persita	9	5	3	1	18	11	+7	18	

Updated to match(es) played on 21 November 2026. Source: Super League 2026–27
Rules for classification: 1) Points; 2) Head-to-head points; 3) Head-to-head goal difference; 4) Head-to-head goals scored; 5) Goal difference; 6) Goals scored; 7) Fair-play points; 8) Draw.

==== Results summary ====
Overall								Home						Away					
Pld	W	D	L	GF	GA	GD	Pts	W	D	L	GF	GA	GD	W	D	L	GF	GA	GD
10	7	1	2	20	9	+11	22	5	0	0	11	3	+8	2	1	2	9	6	+3

Last updated: 21 November 2026.
Source: Competitive matches

==== Results by matchday ====
Matchday	1	2	3	4	5	6	7	8	9	10	11
Ground	A	H	H	A	A	H	H	A	H	A	
Result	W	W	W	W	L	W	W	L	W	D	
Position	6	3	3	1	1	1	1	1	1		

Updated to match(es) played on 7 November 2026. Source: Matches
A = Away; H = Home; W = Win; D = Draw; L = Loss; P = Postponed

==== Score overview ====
Win Draw Loss

Opposition	Home score	Away score	Aggregate score	Double
Arema F.C.	5–1			
Bali United F.C.				
Bhayangkara Presisi Lampung F.C.				
Borneo F.C. Samarinda		0–1		
Dewa United Banten F.C.		2–1		
Isenmulang Kalteng F.C.				
Garudayaksa F.C.				
Java United F.C.	1–0			
Madura United F.C.				
Persebaya Surabaya	1–0			
Persib Bandung	2–1			
Persijap Jepara				
Persik Kediri	2–1			
Persita Tangerang		3–2		
PSIM Yogyakarta		0–4		
PSM Makassar		1–1		
PSS Sleman				

==== Matches ====
Win Draw Loss

===== First round =====
5 September 2026 1	Borneo Samarinda	0–1	Persija Jakarta	Samarinda, East Kalimantan
19:00 UTC+7	Reva (yellow card) 45'	Summary; Report	Calonego (yellow card) 27'; Jeremejeff 45+1'; Kolinger (yellow card) 57'	Stadium: Segiri; Attendance: 6,161; Referee: M. Erfan Efendi S.Pd. (Surabaya)

12 September 2026 2	Persija Jakarta	2–1	Persib Bandung	Central Jakarta, Jakarta
15:30 UTC+7	Jeremejeff 42'; Kolinger (yellow card) 66'; Mamut 90+5'; Lončar (yellow card) 90+7'	Summary; Report	Menalo (yellow card) 69'; Sekulić 82'	Stadium: Gelora Bung Karno; Attendance: 58,961; Referee: Yudai Yamamoto (Indonesia)

19 September 2026 3	Persija Jakarta	1–0	Java United F.C.	Gianyar, Bali
19:00 UTC+7	Arly 13'; Pankov (yellow card) 28'; Kyohei (yellow card) 50'; Ridho (yellow card) 87'	Summary; Report	Setiawan (yellow card) 51'; França (yellow card) 52'	Stadium: Kapten I Wayan Dipta; Attendance: 0 Referee: Candra (Padang)

10 October 2026 4	PSIM Yogyakarta	0–4	Persija Jakarta	Bantul, Yogyakarta
15:30 UTC+7		Summary; Report	Jeremejeff 77'; Lončar (yellow card) 67' (goal) 81' 90+3'; Pankov (yellow card) 70'; Mamut (yellow card) 83'; Kwon 87'	Stadium: Sultan Agung Stadium; Attendance: 8,992; Referee: Nendi Rohaendy (Bandung)

17 October 2026 5	Persita Tangerang	3–2	Persija Jakarta	Pabuaran, Serang Regency, Banten
19:00 UTC+7	Luquinhas 5' (yellow card) 46'; Hokky (yellow card) 56'; Rayco 61' (yellow card) 68'; Dion (yellow card) 73'; Andrejić 90+6'	Summary; Report	Calonego 18'; Kolinger (yellow card) 30'; Jeremejeff (pen.), 74' (yellow card) 77'; Lončar (yellow card) 90+8'	Stadium: Banten International Stadium; Attendance: 5,225; Referee: Rio Permana Putra (Pekanbaru)

21 October 2026 6	Persija Jakarta	5–1	Arema F.C.	Bekasi
19:00 UTC+7	Jeremejeff 10' 45'; Lončar 76'; Dethan 80'; Mamut 90+2'	Summary; Report	Vinicius (yellow card) 79'; Gabi 87'	Stadium: Patriot Candrabhaga Stadium; Attendance: 22,269; Referee: Thoriq Munir Alkatiri (Bandung)

26 October 2026 7	Persija Jakarta	2–1	Persik Kediri	North Jakarta, Jakarta
19:00 UTC+7	Kolinger 64' (yellow card) 90+13'; Ridho 69'; Jeremejeff (yellow card) 88'; Pankov (yellow card) 90+15'	Summary; Report	Imanol 10'; Barbosa (yellow card) 37'; Bayu Otto (yellow card) 58'; Djaló (yellow card) 65'	Stadium: Jakarta International Stadium; Attendance: 15,872; Referee: Steven Yubel Poli (Manado)

31 October 2026 8	Dewa United Banten F.C.	2–1	Persija Jakarta	Pabuaran, Serang Regency, Banten
19:00 UTC+7	Denílson 42'; Kuipers (yellow card) 74'; Fatari (yellow card) 78'; Jenner (yellow card) 82'	Summary; Report	Rayhan 4' (yellow card) 66'; Ridho (yellow card) 9'; Dony Tri (yellow card) 41' (yellow-red card) 66'; Rio (yellow card) 72'	Stadium: Banten International Stadium; Attendance: 993; Referee: M. Erfan Efendi S.Pd. (Surabaya)

7 November 2026 9	Persija Jakarta	1–0	Persebaya Surabaya	North Jakarta, Jakarta
19:00 UTC+7	Hannan (yellow card) 15'; Kolinger (yellow card) 31'; Mamut 89'	Summary; Report	Mota (yellow card) 33'; Catur (yellow card) 44'	Stadium: Jakarta International Stadium; Attendance: 38,774; Referee: Yoko Suprianto (Lima Puluh Kota)

21 November 2026 10	PSM Makassar	1–1	Persija Jakarta	Parepare, South Sulawesi
19:00 UTC+7				Stadium: Gelora B.J. Habibie Stadium

28 November 2026 11	Persija Jakarta	v	Garudayaksa F.C.	Central Jakarta, Jakarta
19:00 UTC+7				Stadium: Gelora Bung Karno Main Stadium

4 December 2026 12	Bhayangkara Presisi Lampung F.C.	v	Persija Jakarta	Bandar Lampung, Lampung
19:00 UTC+7				Stadium: PKOR Sumpah Pemuda Stadium

8 December 2026 13	Isenmulang Kalteng F.C.	v	Persija Jakarta	Palangkaraya, Central Kalimantan
19:00 UTC+7				Stadium: Tuah Pahoe Stadium

12 December 2026 14	Persija Jakarta	v	Bali United F.C.	Central Jakarta, Jakarta
19:00 UTC+7				Stadium: Gelora Bung Karno Main Stadium

16 December 2026 15	Persija Jakarta	v	Madura United F.C.	Central Jakarta, Jakarta
15:30 UTC+7				Stadium: Gelora Bung Karno Main Stadium

22 December 2026 16	Persijap Jepara	v	Persija Jakarta	Jepara, Central Java
19:00 UTC+7				Stadium: Gelora Bumi Kartini Stadium

26 December 2026 17	PSS Sleman	v	Persija Jakarta	Depok, Sleman Regency, Central Java
19:00 UTC+7				Stadium: Maguwoharjo Stadium

===== Second round =====
	v
19:00 UTC+7	[Report (LIB)] [Report (LIBMS)]

=== Indonesia League Cup ===
==== Group A ====
Pos	Team	Pld	W	D	L	GF	GA	GD	Pts	Qualification
1	PSMS (2)	1	0	1	0	1	1	0	1 (Note: Ranked on fair-play points: PSMS –1, Persija –2.)	Advance to round of 12
2	Persija (1)	1	0	1	0	1	1	0	1	
3	Sumsel United (2)	0	0	0	0	0	0	0	0	

First match(es) will be played: 3 November 2026. Source: 2026–27 League Cup
Rules for classification: 1) Points; 2) Head-to-head points; 3) Head-to-head goal difference; 4) Head-to-head goals scored; 5) Goal difference; 6) Goals scored; 7) Fair-play points; 8) Draw.
Notes:

3 November 2026 1	PSMS (2)	1–1	Persija (1)	Deli Serdang
19:00	Samuel S. (yellow card) 73'; Phillerson 80'	Summary; Report	Yoshino (yellow card) 28'; Arhan (yellow card) 36'; Dennis 42'	Stadium: North Sumatra Stadium; Attendance: 22,158; Referee: Yudi Nurcahya (Bandung)

24 November 2026 2	Persija (1)	v	Sumsel United (2)	Central Jakarta
19:00		Report		Stadium: Gelora Bung Karno Stadium

== Statistics ==
=== Squad appearances and goals ===
Last updated on 21 November 2026

Players with no appearances are not included on the list.

No.	Pos	Nat	Player	Total		Super League		League Cup	
No.	Pos	Nat	Player	Apps	Goals	Apps	Goals	Apps	Goals
Goalkeepers
1	GK	(Indonesia) IDN	Aqil Savik	1	0	0	0	1	0
22	GK	(Indonesia) IDN	Nadeo Argawinata	10	0	10	0	0	0
Defenders
2	DF	(Indonesia) IDN	Ilham Rio Fahmi	4	0	2+2	0	0	0
5	DF	(Indonesia) IDN	Rizky Ridho	8	1	6+2	1	0	0
6	DF	(Serbia) SRB	Radovan Pankov	10	0	9+1	0	0	0
18	DF	(Indonesia) IDN	Pratama Arhan	7	0	1+5	0	1	0
21	DF	(Indonesia) IDN	Jordi Amat	4	0	0+3	0	1	0
30	DF	(Croatia) CRO	Denis Kolinger	9	1	9	1	0	0
50	DF	(Bosnia and Herzegovina) BIH	Kerim Memija	11	0	8+2	0	1	0
56	DF	(Indonesia) IDN	Fajar Fathur Rahman	1	0	0	0	0+1	0
59	DF	(Indonesia) IDN	Dia Syayid	1	0	0	0	1	0
77	DF	(Indonesia) IDN	Dony Tri Pamungkas	7	0	6	0	0+1	0
Midfielders
8	MF	(Indonesia) IDN	Witan Sulaeman	9	0	6+2	0	0+1	0
27	MF	(Indonesia) IDN	Nathan Fariel	1	0	0	0	0+1	0
33	MF	(Bosnia and Herzegovina) BIH	Stjepan Lončar	10	3	10	3	0	0
44	MF	(Japan) JPN	Kyohei Yoshino	8	0	4+3	0	1	0
47	MF	(Indonesia) IDN	Figo Dennis	2	1	0+1	0	1	1
58	MF	(Indonesia) IDN	Rayhan Hannan	10	1	8+2	1	0	0
97	MF	(Brazil) BRA	Fábio Da Silva Calonego	10	1	9+1	1	0	0
Forwards
7	FW	(Indonesia) IDN	Victor Dethan	8	1	0+7	1	1	0
9	FW	(Sweden) SWE	Alexander Jeremejeff	9	7	9	7	0	0
11	FW	(Indonesia) IDN	Arlyansyah Abdulmanan	10	1	9	1	0+1	0
13	FW	(South Korea) KOR	Kwon Chang-hoon	8	1	5+2	1	1	0
17	FW	(Croatia) CRO	Ivan Mamut	8	3	2+6	3	0	0
19	FW	(Indonesia) IDN	Agi Firmansyah	1	0	0	0	1	0
98	FW	(Indonesia) IDN	Eksel Runtukahu	1	0	0	0	1	0

Last updated: 21 November 2026.
Source: Soccerway
