= Aditya Warman =

Indonesian footballer (born 2005)

Personal information
- Full name: Aditya Warman
- Date of birth: 2 February 2005 (age 21)
- Place of birth: Jakarta, Indonesia
- Height: 1.77 m (5 ft 10 in)
- Position: Midfielder

Team information
- Current team: Borneo Samarinda
- Number: 36

Youth career
- Imran Soccer Academy
- 2023–2024: Persija Jakarta

Senior career*
Years	Team	Apps	(Gls)
2024–2026	Persija Jakarta	15	(1)
2026–	Borneo Samarinda	1	(0)

International career^{‡}
2024–2025	Indonesia U20	8	(1)
- * Club domestic league appearances and goals as of 5 September 2026 ‡ National team caps and goals as of 13 October 2025

Aditya Warman (born 2 February 2005) is an Indonesian professional footballer who plays as a Midfielder for Super League club Borneo Samarinda.

== Club career ==
Aditya is a youth product of Imran Soccer Academy, before moving to Persija Jakarta academy in 2023. He was promoted to senior team in 2024.

Aditya made his senior Persija debut in the 2024 Piala Presiden against Madura United on 21 July 2024. He came on in the 86th minute, replacing Riko Simanjuntak.

Aditya made his 2024 Liga 1 debut on 6 December 2024, coming on as a second-half substitute for Syahrian Abimanyu in a 1–0 win over Semen Padang.

He scored his first league goal for the club on 3 January 2025. Coming on as a substitute in a 2–0 win over Persijap Jepara, Aditya unleashed a curling long-range shot from outside the penalty box after receiving a pass from Gustavo Franca.

Aditya extended his contract with Persija on 28 May 2025.

== International career ==
Aditya was called up to the Indonesia U20 team in August 2024 for Seoul EOU Cup 2024 in Seoul, South Korea. He made his tournament debut during a 0–2 loss to the Thailand U20 at Mokdong Stadium on 30 August 2024.

On 25 September 2024, Aditya scored his debut goal for the Indonesia U20 during a 4–0 win against Maldives U20 in 2025 AFC U-20 Asian Cup qualification.

== Career statistics ==
=== Club ===
As of match played 23 May 2026

Appearances and goals by club, season and competition
Club	Season	League			Cup		Continental		Other		Total	
Club	Season	Division	Apps	Goals	Apps	Goals	Apps	Goals	Apps	Goals	Apps	Goals
Persija Jakarta	2024–25	Liga 1	4	0	–		–		3 (Note: Appearances in Piala Presiden)	0	7	0
Persija Jakarta	2025–26	Super League	11	1	–		–		0	0	11	1
Career Total			15	1	0	0	0	0	3	0	18	1

=== International ===
As of match played January 2026

Appearances and goals by national team and year
National team	Year	Apps (Note: including appearances in friendly match)	Goals
Indonesia U20	2024	5	1
Indonesia U20	2025	3	0
Total		8	1
