= Gustavo França =

Brazilian footballer (born 1998)

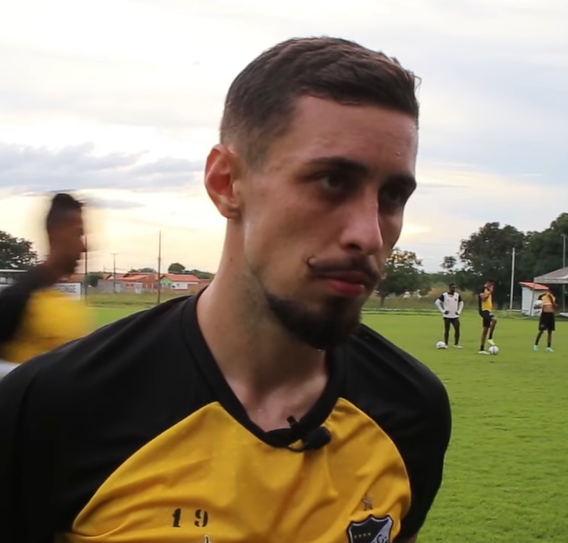
- Gustavo França with ABC in 2022

Personal information
- Full name: Gustavo França Amadio
- Date of birth: 24 April 1998 (age 28)
- Place of birth: São Paulo, Brazil
- Height: 1.76 m (5 ft 9 in)
- Position: Attacking midfielder

Team information
- Current team: Arema
- Number: 10

Youth career
- 2013–2015: Corinthians
- 2015: Nacional
- 2017–2019: Juventus da Mooca
- 2019: Internacional

Senior career*
| Years | Team | Apps | (Gls) |
| 2016–2017 | Floriana | 6 | (0) |
| 2017 | → Kerċem Ajax (loan) | | |
| 2018 | Juventus da Mooca | 0 | (0) |
| 2020 | Metropolitano | 8 | (5) |
| 2021 | America-RJ | 8 | (3) |
| 2021 | Metropolitano | 9 | (1) |
| 2021 | Paraná | 24 | (2) |
| 2022 | Portuguesa | 20 | (4) |
| 2022 | → ABC (loan) | 22 | (2) |
| 2023 | Figueirense | 18 | (5) |
| 2023–2024 | Guarani | 11 | (0) |
| 2024–2025 | Londrina | 23 | (3) |
| 2025–2026 | Persija Jakarta | 12 | (1) |
| 2026– | Arema | 26 | (4) |
- * Club domestic league appearances and goals as of 20 November 2026

Gustavo França Amadio (born 24 April 1998) is a Brazilian professional footballer who plays as an attacking midfielder for Super League club Arema.

== Club career ==
Born in São Paulo, Gustavo França played for Corinthians and Nacional-SP as a youth, before moving to Malta in 2016 with Floriana. After featuring sparingly, he was loaned to Kerċem Ajax in January 2017, until June.

Gustavo França returned to his home country shortly after, joining Juventus-SP and returning to the youth setup. He appeared with the first team in the 2018 Copa Paulista, but moved to Internacional in January 2019, being initially assigned to the under-23 team.

In October 2020, Gustavo França was included in Metropolitano's squad for the year's Campeonato Catarinense Série B. On 26 December, he moved to America-RJ for the upcoming season, but returned to Metropolitano shortly after.

On 2 May 2021, Gustavo França was announced at Série C side Paraná. On 6 December, he agreed to a deal with Portuguesa.

On 28 April 2022, after helping Lusa in their Campeonato Paulista Série A2 winning campaign, Gustavo França was loaned to ABC in the third division. On 22 December, he moved to fellow league team Figueirense on a two-year contract.

On 21 July 2025, Gustavo França joined Persija Jakarta of the Indonesian Super League. Gustavo França made his Persija debut in a pre-season friendly against Arema on 26 July 2025, also scored his first goal for the club in a 3–0 win at Jakarta International Stadium.

On 20 January 2026, Gustavo França officially joined Arema.

== Career statistics ==
As of 20 November 2026

| Club | Season | League | | | State League | | Cup | | Continental | | Other | | Total | |
| Club | Season | Division | Apps | Goals | Apps | Goals | Apps | Goals | Apps | Goals | Apps | Goals | Apps | Goals |
|---|---|---|---|---|---|---|---|---|---|---|---|---|---|---|
| Floriana | 2016–17 | Maltese Premier League | 6 | 0 | — | | 1 | 0 | — | | — | | 7 | 0 |
| Juventus-SP | 2018 | Paulista A2 | — | | 0 | 0 | — | | — | | 6 (Note: Appearance(s) in Copa Paulista) | 0 | 6 | 0 |
| Metropolitano | 2020 | Catarinense Série B | — | | 8 | 5 | — | | — | | — | | 8 | 5 |
| America-RJ | 2021 | Carioca | — | | 8 | 3 | — | | — | | — | | 8 | 3 |
| Metropolitano | 2021 | Catarinense | — | | 9 | 1 | — | | — | | — | | 9 | 1 |
| Paraná | 2021 | Série C | 17 | 2 | 7 | 0 | — | | — | | — | | 8 | 0 |
| Portuguesa | 2022 | Paulista A2 | — | | 20 | 4 | — | | — | | — | | 20 | 4 |
| ABC (loan) | 2022 | Série C | 22 | 2 | — | | — | | — | | — | | 22 | 2 |
| Figueirense | 2023 | Série C | 18 | 5 | 13 (Note: Appearances in Campeonato Catarinense) | 2 | — | | — | | — | | 31 | 7 |
| Guarani | 2023 | Série B | 7 | 0 | 0 | 0 | 0 | 0 | 0 | 0 | 0 | 0 | 7 | 0 |
| Guarani | 2024 | Série B | 4 | 0 | 5 (Note: Appearances in Campeonato Paulista) | 0 | 0 | 0 | 0 | 0 | 0 | 0 | 9 | 0 |
| Londrina | 2024 | Série C | 13 | 2 | 0 | 0 | 0 | 0 | 0 | 0 | 0 | 0 | 13 | 2 |
| Londrina | 2025 | Série C | 10 | 1 | 15 (Note: Appearances in Campeonato Paranaense) | 3 | 0 | 0 | 0 | 0 | 0 | 0 | 25 | 4 |
| Persija Jakarta | 2025–26 | Super League | 12 | 1 | — | | — | | — | | — | | 12 | 1 |
| Arema | 2025–26 | Super League | 17 | 3 | — | | — | | — | | — | | 17 | 3 |
| Arema | 2026–27 | Super League | 9 | 1 | — | | 1 | 0 | — | | 5 (Note: Appearances in Piala Presiden) | 0 | 15 | 1 |
| Career total | | | 135 | 17 | 85 | 18 | 2 | 0 | 0 | 0 | 11 | 0 | 217 | 33 |

== Honours ==
Floriana

- Maltese FA Trophy: 2016–17

Portuguesa

- Campeonato Paulista Série A2: 2022
