= Eksel Runtukahu =

Indonesian footballer

- Eksel with Persija in 2026

Personal information
- Full name: Eksel Timothy Joseph Runtukahu
- Date of birth: 2 September 1998 (age 28)
- Place of birth: Tondano, Indonesia
- Height: 1.76 m (5 ft 9 in)
- Position: Forward

Team information
- Current team: Persija Jakarta
- Number: 98

Youth career
- SSB Tumou Tou

Senior career*
Years	Team	Apps	(Gls)
2014–2016	Persmin Minahasa	32	(12)
2017–2018	Kalteng Putra	32	(4)
2019–2023	Sulut United	28	(8)
2023	→ Barito Putera (loan)	12	(2)
2023–2025	Barito Putera	42	(10)
2025–	Persija Jakarta	23	(6)
- * Club domestic league appearances and goals as of 10 May 2026

Eksel Timothy Joseph Runtukahu (born 2 September 1998) is an Indonesian professional footballer who plays as a forward for Super League club Persija Jakarta.

== Early life ==
Runtukahu is from Tondano, Indonesia.

== Club career ==
=== Youth career ===
Runtukahu started his career at SSB Timou Tou when he was 13 years old, before starting his professional career with Persmin Minahasa, who at that time played in Liga 3.

=== Kalteng Putera ===
After that, Runtukahu made a career outside his hometown by playing for Kalteng Putra in Liga 2 competition. In the 2018 season, he took part in bringing Kalteng Putra to promotion to Liga 1 after winning over Persita Tangerang in the 3rd place match.

=== Sulut United ===
In 2019, Runtukahu returned to North Sulawesi to play for Sulut United in the League 2 competition.

==== Loan to Barito Putera ====
He was signed for Barito Putera to play in Liga 1 in the 2023 season, on loan from Sulut United. Runtukahu made his professional debut on 14 February 2023 in a match against RANS Nusantara at the Demang Lehman Stadium, Martapura. He had scored five goals in four games for before the 2022–23 Liga 2 was suspended.

=== Persija Jakarta ===
On 25 June 2025, Runtukahu officially signed Persija Jakarta. Runtukahu made his Persija debut in a pre-season friendly against Arema on 26 July 2025, also scored his first goal with score a brace for the club in a 3–0 win at Jakarta International Stadium.

== Others ==
Runtukahu was called up by Rahmad Darmawan to played for the Liga Indonesia All-Stars in the 2025 Piala Presiden where he scored in a 6–3 lost to EFL Championship club Oxford United on 6 July 2025.

== Style of play ==
Runtuhaku mainly operates as a striker.

== Honours ==
=== Club ===
Kalteng Putra

- Liga 2 third place (play-offs): 2018
