= Jehan Pahlevi =

Indonesian footballer (born 2006)

Personal information
- Full name: Jehan Pahlevi
- Date of birth: 18 March 2006 (age 20)
- Place of birth: Jakarta, Indonesia
- Height: 1.76 m (5 ft 9 in)
- Position: Winger

Team information
- Current team: PSS Sleman (on loan from Persija Jakarta)
- Number: 15

Youth career
- SSB Bionsa
- 2016–2018: SSB Putra Sejati
- RMD FC
- POPB DKI Jakarta
- 2021–2024: Persija Jakarta

Senior career*
Years	Team	Apps	(Gls)
2024–	Persija Jakarta	0	(0)
2024–2025	→ Persiku Kudus (loan)	9	(0)
2026–	→ PSS Sleman (loan)	5	(0)

International career^{‡}
2022	Indonesia U17	7	(1)
2024–2025	Indonesia U20	6	(0)
- * Club domestic league appearances and goals as of 9 May 2026 ‡ National team caps and goals as of 19 February 2025

Jehan Pahlevi (born 18 March 2006 in Jakarta) is an Indonesian professional footballer who plays as a winger for Championship club PSS Sleman, on loan from Persija Jakarta.

== Club career ==
=== Persija Jakarta ===
Jehan started playing football since the age of 6, because of the influence of his father who was a football fanatic. He started joining Persija U-16 in 2021. Coincidentally, Jehan and his family like Persija, and you could say they have been Jakmania since childhood.

==== Loan to Persiku Kudus ====
On 11 August 2024, Persiku Kudus announced that Jehan had joined the Liga 2 club on loan from Persija Jakarta for the 2024–25 season. He made his professional debut on 7 September 2024 in a 0–0 draw over Nusantara United. Jehan has always been the first team for Persiku Kudus in Group B of Liga 2 this season. His role in midfield is irreplaceable and he even became a midfield partner with Renshi Yamaguchi. He had a good of the season for Persiku with 9 league appearances.

== International career ==
In October 2022, Jehan was named in Indonesia U17's team for the 2023 AFC U-17 Asian Cup qualification. On 3 October 2022, he made his debut and scored a goal in a 14–0 win against Guam U17. Four days later, he made his starter debut in the qualification campaign at a 2–0 win against Palestine U17.

In November 2023, Jehan also was named in Indonesia U17's team for the 2023 FIFA U-17 World Cup, hosted in his home country Indonesia. He started in all three group stage matches and helped Indonesia drew two games but the team failed to advance to the next stage.

== Honours ==
PSS Sleman

- Championship runner up: 2025–26
