= Ilhamsyah =

Indonesian footballer

Personal information
- Full name: Muhammad Ilhamsyah
- Date of birth: 2 July 1999 (age 27)
- Place of birth: Balikpapan, Indonesia
- Height: 1.69 m (5 ft 7 in)
- Position: Defensive midfielder

Team information
- Current team: Madura United
- Number: 36

Youth career
- 2018–2019: Persiba Balikpapan
- 2019: Borneo Samarinda

Senior career*
Years	Team	Apps	(Gls)
2019–2023	Borneo	9	(0)
2021	→ RANS Cilegon (loan)	6	(0)
2022	→ Bekasi City (loan)	5	(0)
2023–2024	RANS Nusantara	25	(0)
2024–	Madura United	31	(0)
- * Club domestic league appearances and goals as of 6 September 2026

Muhammad Ilhamsyah (born 2 July 1999), simply known as Ilhamsyah, is an Indonesian professional footballer who plays as a defensive midfielder for Indonesian club Madura United.

== Club career ==
=== Borneo ===
Ilhamsyah signed with Borneo to play in the Indonesian Liga 1 for the 2019 season. He made his league debut on 5 November 2019 in a match against Badak Lampung at the Segiri Stadium, Samarinda.

==== RANS Cilegon (loan) ====
In 2021, Ilhamsyah signed a contract with Indonesian Liga 2 club RANS Cilegon. He made his league debut on 2 November 2021 in a match against Dewa United at the Gelora Bung Karno Madya Stadium, Jakarta.

== Career statistics ==
=== Club ===
As of 6 September 2026

Club	Season	League			Cup		Continental		Other		Total	
Club	Season	Division	Apps	Goals	Apps	Goals	Apps	Goals	Apps	Goals	Apps	Goals
Borneo	2019	Liga 1	6	0	0	0	–		0	0	6	0
Borneo	2020	Liga 1	0	0	0	0	–		0	0	0	0
Borneo	2021	Liga 1	3	0	0	0	–		0	0	3	0
RANS Cilegon (loan)	2021	Liga 2	6	0	0	0	–		0	0	6	0
Bekasi City (loan)	2022–23	Liga 2	5	0	0	0	–		0	0	5	0
RANS Nusantara	2023–24	Liga 1	25	0	0	0	–		0	0	25	0
Madura United	2024–25	Liga 1	20	0	0	0	4 (Note: Appearances in AFC Challenge League)	0	0	0	24	0
Madura United	2025–26	Super League	10	0	0	0	–		0	0	10	0
Madura United	2026–27	Super League	1	0	0	0	–		0	0	1	0
Career total			76	0	0	0	4	0	0	0	80	0
