= Cyrus Margono =

American soccer player

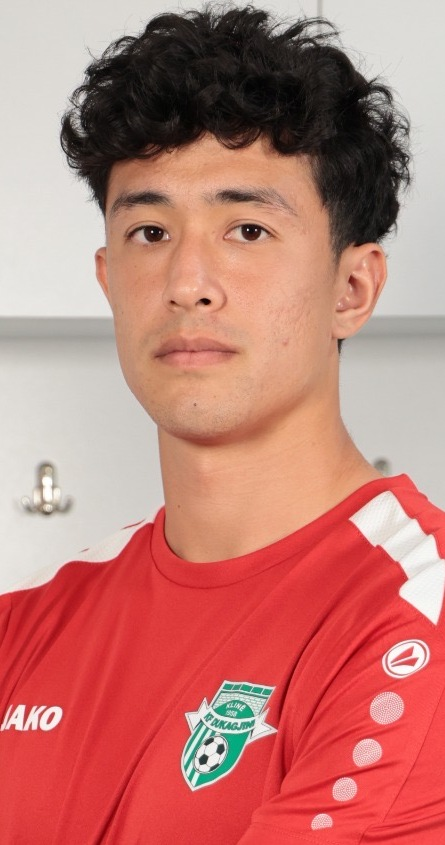
- Margono with Dukagjini in 2025

Personal information
- Full name: Cyrus Ashkon Margono
- Date of birth: November 9, 2001 (age 24)
- Place of birth: Mount Kisco, New York, United States
- Height: 1.90 m (6 ft 3 in)
- Position: Goalkeeper

Team information
- Current team: Java United (on loan from Persija Jakarta)
- Number: 93

Youth career
- 2015–2019: New York Soccer Club
- 2019–2020: Met Oval Academy

College career
Years	Team	Apps	(Gls)
2020	Denver Pioneers	0	(0)
2020–2021	Kentucky Wildcats	3	(0)

Senior career*
Years	Team	Apps	(Gls)
2021–2024	Panathinaikos B	17	(0)
2025	Dukagjini	29	(0)
2026–	Persija Jakarta	2	(0)
2026–	→ Java United (loan)	1	(0)
- * Club domestic league appearances and goals as of 6 September 2026

Cyrus Ashkon Margono (born November 9, 2001) is an American professional soccer player who plays as a goalkeeper for Super League club Java United, on loan from Persija Jakarta.

== Early life ==
Margono was born in Mount Kisco, New York, United States, on November 9, 2001. His father was born in Bali and raised in Surabaya, East Java. His mother is from Iran.

Margono attended Sleepy Hollow High School in Sleepy Hollow, New York. After graduation in 2019, he continued his education at University of Denver, where he played college soccer for a year. He then moved to University of Kentucky.

== Club career ==
=== Panathinaikos B ===
In 2015, Margono trained with the youth academy of Italian Serie A side Inter Milan. In 2021, he signed for Panathinaikos B in Greece. On April 16, 2022, he debuted for Panathinaikos B during a 3–0 loss to Levadiakos.

=== Dukagjini ===
Margono was officially introduced as a player for Dukagjini in Kosovo on February 5, 2025. He made his debut in the Kosovo Superleague in a 1–0 defeat to FC Ballkani on February 7. He achieved his first win with Dukagjini in a 2–1 victory over Suhareka on February 15.

On November 30, 2025, Margono left Dukagjini and became a free agent.

=== Persija Jakarta ===
On February 6, 2026, Margono officially joined Persija Jakarta on a two and a half-year contract.

==== Loan to Java United ====
In August 2026, he was sent out on loan to Java United for the 2026–27 season to gain regular playing time.

== International career ==
Margono is eligible to represent the Indonesia, United States, and Iran internationally through his birth and his parents.

== Personal life ==
On March 21, 2024, Margono officially reaffirmed his Indonesian citizenship. Born in the United States to an Indonesian father and an Iranian mother, he initially held limited dual nationality of both the United States and Indonesia. His Indonesian citizenship was revoked when he turned 21, as he failed to declare it within the required time limit. He later obtained an affidavit from the Indonesian Ministry of Law and Human Rights and Ministry of the State Secretariat to re-declare his Indonesian citizenship.

== Career statistics ==
=== Club ===
As of the match played April 5, 2026

Club	Season	League			Cup		Continental		Other		Total	
Club	Season	Division	Apps	Goals	Apps	Goals	Apps	Goals	Apps	Goals	Apps	Goals
Panathinaikos B	2021–22	Super League 2	1	0	0	0	—		0	0	1	0
Panathinaikos B	2022–23	Super League 2	8	0	0	0	—		0	0	8	0
Panathinaikos B	2023–24	Super League 2	8	0	0	0	—		0	0	8	0
Panathinaikos B	Total		17	0	0	0	0	0	0	0	17	0
Dukagjini	2024–25	Kosovo Superleague	17	0	1	0	—		0	0	18	0
Dukagjini	2025–26	Kosovo Superleague	12	0	0	0	—		0	0	12	0
Dukagjini	Total		29	0	1	0	0	0	0	0	30	0
Persija Jakarta	2025–26	Super League	2	0	—		—		0	0	2	0
Career total			48	0	1	0	0	0	0	0	49	0

== See also ==
- List of Indonesia footballers born outside Indonesia
