= Arlyansyah Abdulmanan =

Indonesian footballer (born 2005)

- Arlyansyah with Persija in 2026

Personal information
- Full name: Arlyansyah Abdulmanan
- Date of birth: 20 December 2005 (age 20)
- Place of birth: Jakarta, Indonesia
- Height: 1.68 m (5 ft 6 in)
- Positions: Winger; attacking midfielder

Team information
- Current team: Persija Jakarta
- Number: 11

Youth career
- 2021: ASIOP Apacinti
- 2021–2022: PSJS South Jakarta U17
- 2022: Persib Bandung
- 2022: PPOP DKI Jakarta
- 2023–2024: Persija Jakarta

Senior career*
Years	Team	Apps	(Gls)
2024–	Persija Jakarta	24	(2)
2024–2025	→ PSIM Yogyakarta (loan)	12	(4)

International career^{‡}
2024–2025	Indonesia U20	21	(3)
2025–	Indonesia U23	1	(0)
Medal record
Men's football
Representing Indonesia
ASEAN U-19 Boys Championship
Winner	2024 Indonesia	Team
- * Club domestic league appearances and goals as of 8 November 2026 ‡ National team caps and goals as of 13 October 2025

Arlyansyah Abdulmanan (born 20 December 2005) is an Indonesian professional footballer who plays as a winger or attacking midfielder for Super League club Persija Jakarta.

== Club career ==
=== PSIM Yogyakarta ===
PSIM Yogyakarta announced the loan of two young players, Figo Dennis and Abdulmanan, from Persija Jakarta to compete in the 2024–25 Liga 2 season. Abdulmanan made his debut against Nusantara United.

== International career ==
He scored two goals in the first match of the AFF U19 2024 against Philippines U20.

== Honours ==
=== Club ===
PSIM Yogyakarta

- Liga 2: 2024–25

=== International ===
Indonesia U-19

- ASEAN U-19 Boys Championship: 2024

=== Individual ===
- Piala Presiden Best Young Player: 2026
