= Carlos Eduardo (footballer, born 1992) =

Brazilian footballer (born 1992)

Personal information
- Full name: Carlos Eduardo Soares Mota
- Date of birth: 24 February 1992 (age 34)
- Place of birth: Porto Alegre, Brazil
- Height: 1.92 m (6 ft 4 in)
- Position: Goalkeeper

Team information
- Current team: Brasil de Pelotas
- Number: 1

Senior career*
| Years | Team | Apps | (Gls) |
| 2012–2013 | Concórdia | 0 | (0) |
| 2014 | Brasil de Farroupilha | 0 | (0) |
| 2015–2019 | Brasil de Pelotas | 53 | (0) |
| 2020–2022 | Sport Recife | 11 | (0) |
| 2023 | Santo André | 2 | (0) |
| 2023 | Retrô | 0 | (0) |
| 2023 | → Chapecoense (loan) | 0 | (0) |
| 2024 | ABC | 22 | (0) |
| 2024–2026 | Persija Jakarta | 39 | (0) |
| 2026– | Brasil de Pelotas | 0 | (0) |
- * Club domestic league appearances and goals as of 10 May 2026

Carlos Eduardo Soares Mota (born 24 February 1992), commonly known as Seco, is a Brazilian professional footballer who plays as a goalkeeper for Brazilian club Brasil de Pelotas.

== Club career ==
He made his national league debut for Brasil de Pelotas as a substitute for the injured Marcelo Pitol, against Paysandu in the 35 round of 2017 Campeonato Brasileiro Série B on 11 November 2017. He became first choice goalkeeper when Marcelo left the club at the end of 2018.

== Honours ==
Individual

- Liga 1 Save of the Month: December 2024
