= Maxwell (footballer, born 1995) =

Brazilian footballer

- Maxwell with Persija in 2026

Personal information
- Full name: Emaxwell Souza de Lima
- Date of birth: 11 February 1995 (age 31)
- Place of birth: Maceió, Brazil
- Height: 1.78 m (5 ft 10 in)
- Position: Winger

Team information
- Current team: Operário Ferroviário

Senior career*
Years	Team	Apps	(Gls)
2015	CRB	36	(5)
2016–2018	Comercial-SP	0	(0)
2016	→ Red Bull Brasil (loan)	4	(0)
2016	→ Tupi (loan)	1	(0)
2017	→ CRB (loan)	17	(2)
2018	→ ABC (loan)	15	(1)
2018–2019	Resende	14	(7)
2019–2021	Kalmar FF	14	(0)
2020–2021	→ Cuiabá (loan)	32	(6)
2021	→ Sport Recife (loan)	18	(0)
2021	→ Guarani (loan)	12	(0)
2022	Guarani	20	(0)
2023	Chapecoense	23	(5)
2023–2024	Náutico	2	(1)
2024–2025	Operário Ferroviário	41	(10)
2025	Remo	12	(3)
2025–2026	Persija Jakarta	31	(16)
2026–	Operário Ferroviário	14	(1)
- * Club domestic league appearances and goals as of 18 November 2026

Emaxwell Souza de Lima (born 11 February 1995), commonly known as Maxwell, is a Brazilian professional footballer who plays as a winger for Operário Ferroviário.

== Career ==
On 11 March 2019, Maxwell joined Allsvenskan side Kalmar FF on a four-and-a-half-year deal.

== Career statistics ==
=== Club ===
As of 23 May 2026

Club	Season	League			State League		Cup		Other		Total	
Club	Season	Division	Apps	Goals	Apps	Goals	Apps	Goals	Apps	Goals	Apps	Goals
CRB	2015	Série B	36	5	–	–	–	–	–	–	36	5
Red Bull Brasil	2016	–	4	0	–	–	–	–	–	–	4	0
Tupi (loan)	2016	Série B	1	0	–	–	–	–	–	–	1	0
CRB (loan)	2017	Série B	17	2	–	–	–	–	–	–	17	2
ABC (loan)	2018	Série C	15	1	–	–	–	–	–	–	15	1
Resende	2018–2019	–	14	7	–	–	–	–	–	–	14	7
Kalmar	2019–2021	Allsvenskan	14	0	–	–	–	–	–	–	14	0
Cuiabá (loan)	2020–2021	Série A	32	6	–	–	–	–	–	–	32	6
Sport Recife (loan)	2021	Série B	18	0	–	–	–	–	–	–	18	0
Guarani (loan & permanent)	2021–2022	Série B	32	0	–	–	–	–	–	–	32	0
Chapecoense	2023	Série B	23	5	–	–	–	–	–	–	23	5
Náutico	2023–2024	Série B	2	1	–	–	–	–	–	–	2	1
Operário	2024–2025	Série B	41	10	–	–	–	–	–	–	41	10
Remo	2025	Série B	12	3	–	–	–	–	–	–	12	3
Persija Jakarta	2025–2026	Super League	31	16	–	–	–	–	–	–	31	16
Career total			278	66	0	0	0	0	0	0	278	66

== Honours ==
Remo

- Campeonato Paraense: 2025

Individual

- Super League Goal of the Month: August 2025
