= Figo Dennis =

Indonesian footballer (born 2006)

- Figo with Persija in 2026

Personal information
- Full name: Figo Dennis Saputrananto
- Date of birth: 28 April 2006 (age 20)
- Place of birth: Probolinggo, Indonesia
- Height: 1.72 m (5 ft 8 in)
- Position: Defensive midfielder

Team information
- Current team: Persija Jakarta

Youth career
- 2017–2018: Imran Soccer Academy
- 2020–2021: Ricky Nelson Academy
- 2021–2024: Persija Jakarta

Senior career*
| Years | Team | Apps | (Gls) |
| 2024– | Persija Jakarta | 3 | (0) |
| 2024–2025 | → PSIM Yogyakarta (loan) | 8 | (0) |
| 2026 | → PSS Sleman (loan) | 12 | (0) |

International career
| 2022–2023 | Indonesia U17 | 11 | (1) |
| 2024–2025 | Indonesia U20 | 18 | (2) |
Medal record
Men's football
Representing Indonesia
ASEAN U-16 Boys Championship
| Winner | 2022 Indonesia |
ASEAN U-19 Boys Championship
| Winner | 2024 Indonesia | Team |
- * Club domestic league appearances and goals as of 22 October 2026

Figo Dennis Saputrananto (born 28 April 2006) is an Indonesian professional footballer who plays as a defensive midfielder for Indonesian Super League Persija Jakarta.

== Club career ==
=== PSIM Yogyakarta ===
PSIM Yogyakarta announced the loan of two young players, Dennis and Arlyansyah Abdulmanan, from Persija Jakarta to compete in the 2024–25 Liga 2 season. Dennis made his debut against Persiku Kudus.

== Honours ==
=== Club ===
PSIM Yogyakarta

- Liga 2: 2024–25

PSS Sleman

- Championship runner up: 2025–26

=== International ===
Indonesia U16

- ASEAN U-16 Boys Championship: 2022

Indonesia U-19

- ASEAN U-19 Boys Championship: 2024
