= Fábio Calonego =

Brazilian footballer

- Calonego with Persija in 2026

Personal information
- Full name: Fábio da Silva Calonego
- Date of birth: 24 July 1997 (age 29)
- Place of birth: Novo Hamburgo, Brazil
- Height: 1.80 m (5 ft 11 in)
- Position: Defensive midfielder

Team information
- Current team: Persija Jakarta
- Number: 97

Youth career
- 2014–2016: Aimoré
- 2016–2017: Criciúma

Senior career*
Years	Team	Apps	(Gls)
2017–2019	Ypiranga	16	(0)
2019–2021	Operário Ferroviário	0	(0)
2021–2022	Azuriz	15	(0)
2022–2023	Aimoré	0	(0)
2023–2025	Confiança	37	(0)
2025–	Persija Jakarta	39	(4)
- * Club domestic league appearances and goals as of 8 November 2026

Fábio da Silva Calonego (born 24 July 1997), commonly known as Fábio Silva or Fábio Calonego, is a Brazilian professional footballer who plays as a defensive midfielder for Super League club Persija Jakarta.

== Club career ==
Born in Novo Hamburgo, Brazil, Fábio is a youth product from Aimoré and Criciúma. In 2017, he started off senior career in the Brazilian club Ypiranga. He was signed to Operário Ferroviário in 2019 season. He made his club debut on 19 January 2020, in a 1–0 home win against Cascavel in the 2020 Campeonato Paranaense.

=== Confiança ===
On 28 February 2023, Fábio signed a contract with Confiança. He made his league debut on 5 March 2023, in a 2–2 draw against Lagarto.

On 8 October 2024, Fábio extended his contract with the club until 2025. In the 2024 season, he played a total of 28 matches and scored one goal for Confiança. He scored in the Copa do Nordeste pre-match against Retrô.

In 2025, Fábio was linked with a move to Santa Cruz, but the deal eventually fell through. During his three seasons with Confiança, he played a total of 78 games and scored six goals, he was also the second most played of the season, with 2.426 minutes played.

=== Persija Jakarta ===
On 10 July 2025, Super League club Persija Jakarta announced the signing of Fábio on a year contract. He was contracted by the club on a fee transfer.

== Honours ==
Ypiranga

- Campeonato Gaúcho Série A2: 2019

Confiança

- Campeonato Sergipano: 2024, 2025
