= Bruno Tubarão =

Brazilian footballer (born 1995)

- Tubarão with Persija in 2025

Personal information
- Full name: Bruno Nunes de Barros
- Date of birth: 5 March 1995 (age 31)
- Place of birth: Rio de Janeiro, Brazil
- Height: 1.80 m (5 ft 11 in)
- Position: Right-back

Team information
- Current team: Chapecoense
- Number: 20

Youth career
- 2014: Cabofriense

Senior career*
Years	Team	Apps	(Gls)
2015–2018	Cabofriense	22	(2)
2016	→ Madureira (loan)	0	(0)
2017	→ Sampaio Corrêa (loan)	14	(2)
2018	→ Boa Esporte (loan)	32	(2)
2019	Red Bull Brasil	12	(2)
2019–2022	Red Bull Bragantino	84	(6)
2022	→ Vasco da Gama (loan)	10	(2)
2023–2024	Atlético Goianiense	86	(4)
2025	Ceará	8	(0)
2025–2026	Persija Jakarta	27	(1)
2026–	Chapecoense	3	(0)
- * Club domestic league appearances and goals as of 20 October 2026

Bruno Nunes de Barros (born 5 March 1995), commonly known as Bruno Tubarão, is a Brazilian professional footballer who plays as a right-back for Campeonato Brasileiro Série A club Chapecoense.

== Club career ==
Bruno Tubarão started his career at Cabofriense, representing the club in the Campeonato Carioca between 2016 and 2018. He also spent time on loan at clubs in the lower divisions of the championship, before making a breakthrough loan move to Boa Esporte to be part of their 2018 Campeonato Brasileiro Série B squad.

Despite Boa Esporte's relegation, Bruno Tubarão was singled out and earned a move to Red Bull Brasil for 2019. He became part of the Red Bull Bragantino squad when Red Bull Brasil merged with Clube Atlético Bragantino in April 2019.
