= Allano =

Brazilian footballer (born 1995)

- Allano with Persija in 2026

Personal information
- Full name: Allano Brendon de Souza Lima
- Date of birth: 24 April 1995 (age 31)
- Place of birth: Rio de Janeiro, Brazil
- Height: 1.82 m (6 ft 0 in)
- Position: Winger

Team information
- Current team: Bhayangkara Presisi
- Number: 10

Youth career
- Corinthians
- –2014: Botafogo

Senior career*
Years	Team	Apps	(Gls)
2014	Botafogo	2	(0)
2015–2017	Cruzeiro	29	(1)
2016	→ Bahia (loan)	14	(2)
2017	→ Estoril (loan)	10	(1)
2017–2021	Estoril	29	(5)
2018–2019	→ Bursaspor (loan)	31	(1)
2019	→ Ventforet Kofu (loan)	13	(1)
2020–2021	→ CSA (loan)	19	(2)
2021–2023	Santa Clara	57	(5)
2023–2024	Goiás	19	(1)
2024	→ Criciúma (loan)	24	(1)
2025	Operário Ferroviário	12	(1)
2025–2026	Persija Jakarta	29	(9)
2026–	Bhayangkara Presisi	7	(2)
- * Club domestic league appearances and goals as of 21 October 2026

Allano Brendon de Souza Lima (born 24 April 1995), simply known as Allano, is a Brazilian professional footballer who plays as a winger for Super League club Bhayangkara Presisi.

== Club career ==
Allano was born in Rio de Janeiro and finished his formation with Botafogo. He made his senior debut on 8 February 2014, starting in a 0–1 home loss against Friburguense for the Campeonato Carioca championship.

On 28 October 2014, Allano moved to Cruzeiro after having indiscipline problems at Fogão, and returned to youth football. Previously a left back, he was converted to an attacking midfielder at his new club.

Promoted to the main squad, Allano made his Série A debut on 3 June 2015, coming on as a second-half substitute for Willian in a 1–0 home win against Flamengo.

== Career statistics ==
As of match played 5 September 2026

Appearances and goals by club, season and competition
Club	Season	League			State league		National cup (Note: Includes Copa do Brasil, Taça de Portugal, Turkish Cup, Emperor's Cup)		Continental		Other		Total	
Club	Season	Division	Apps	Goals	Apps	Goals	Apps	Goals	Apps	Goals	Apps	Goals	Apps	Goals
Botafogo	2014	Série A	0	0	2 (Note: Appearance(s) in Campeonato Carioca)	0	0	0	0	0	—		2	0
Cruzeiro	2015	Série A	16	0	0	0	1	0	0	0	—		17	0
Cruzeiro	2016	Série A	9	0	4 (Note: Appearance(s) in Campeonato Mineiro)	1	4	1	—		2 (Note: Appearance(s) in Primeira Liga)	0	19	2
Cruzeiro	2017	Série A	0	0	0	0	0	0	0	0	0	0	0	0
Cruzeiro	Total		25	0	4	1	5	1	0	0	2	0	36	2
Bahia (loan)	2016	Série B	14	2	0	0	0	0	—		0	0	14	2
Estoril (loan)	2016-17	Primeira Liga	10	1	—		1	0	—		0	0	11	1
Estoril	2017-18	Primeira Liga	29	5	—		0	0	—		1 (Note: Appearance(s) in Taça da Liga)	0	30	5
Estoril	2018-19	LigaPro	0	0	—		0	0	—		0	0	0	0
Estoril	2019-20	LigaPro	0	0	—		0	0	—		0	0	0	0
Estoril	2020-21	Liga Portugal 2	0	0	—		0	0	—		0	0	0	0
Estoril	Total		29	5	—		0	0	0	0	1	0	30	5
Bursaspor (loan)	2018-19	Süper Lig	31	1	—		1	0	—		—		32	1
Ventforet Kofu (loan)	2019	J2 League	13	1	—		0	0	—		0	0	13	1
CSA (loan)	2020	Série B	12	0	7 (Note: Appearance(s) in Campeonato Alagoano)	2	1	1	—		7 (Note: Appearance(s) in Copa do Nordeste)	2	27	5
Santa Clara	2020-21	Primeira Liga	18	2	—		0	0	—		0	0	18	2
Santa Clara	2021-22	Primeira Liga	19	2	—		1	0	3 (Note: Appearance(s) in UEFA Europa Conference League)	0	2	0	25	2
Santa Clara	2022-23	Primeira Liga	20	1	—		1	0	—		2	0	23	1
Santa Clara	Total		57	5	—		2	0	3	0	4	0	66	5
Goiás	2023	Série A	19	1	0	0	0	0	2 (Note: Appearance(s) in Copa Sudamericana)	0	0	0	21	1
Goiás	2024	Série B	0	0	13 (Note: Appearance(s) in Campeonato Goiano)	2	0	0	—		1 (Note: Appearance(s) in Copa Verde)	0	14	2
Goiás	Total		19	1	13	2	0	0	2	0	1	0	35	3
Criciúma (loan)	2024	Série A	24	1	0	0	1	0	—		—		25	1
Operário Ferroviário	2025	Série B	12	1	6 (Note: Appearance(s) in Campeonato Paranaense)	0	4	0	—		—		22	1
Persija Jakarta	2025–26	Super League	29	9	0	0	0	0	—		—		29	9
Bhayangkara Presisi	2026–27	Super League	1	1	0	0	0	0	—		—		1	1
Career total			276	28	32	5	15	2	5	0	15	2	343	37

== Honours ==
=== Club ===
Operário Ferroviário

- Campeonato Paranaense: 2025
