= Jakarta International Stadium =

Stadium in North Jakarta, Indonesia

- Stadion Internasional Jakarta

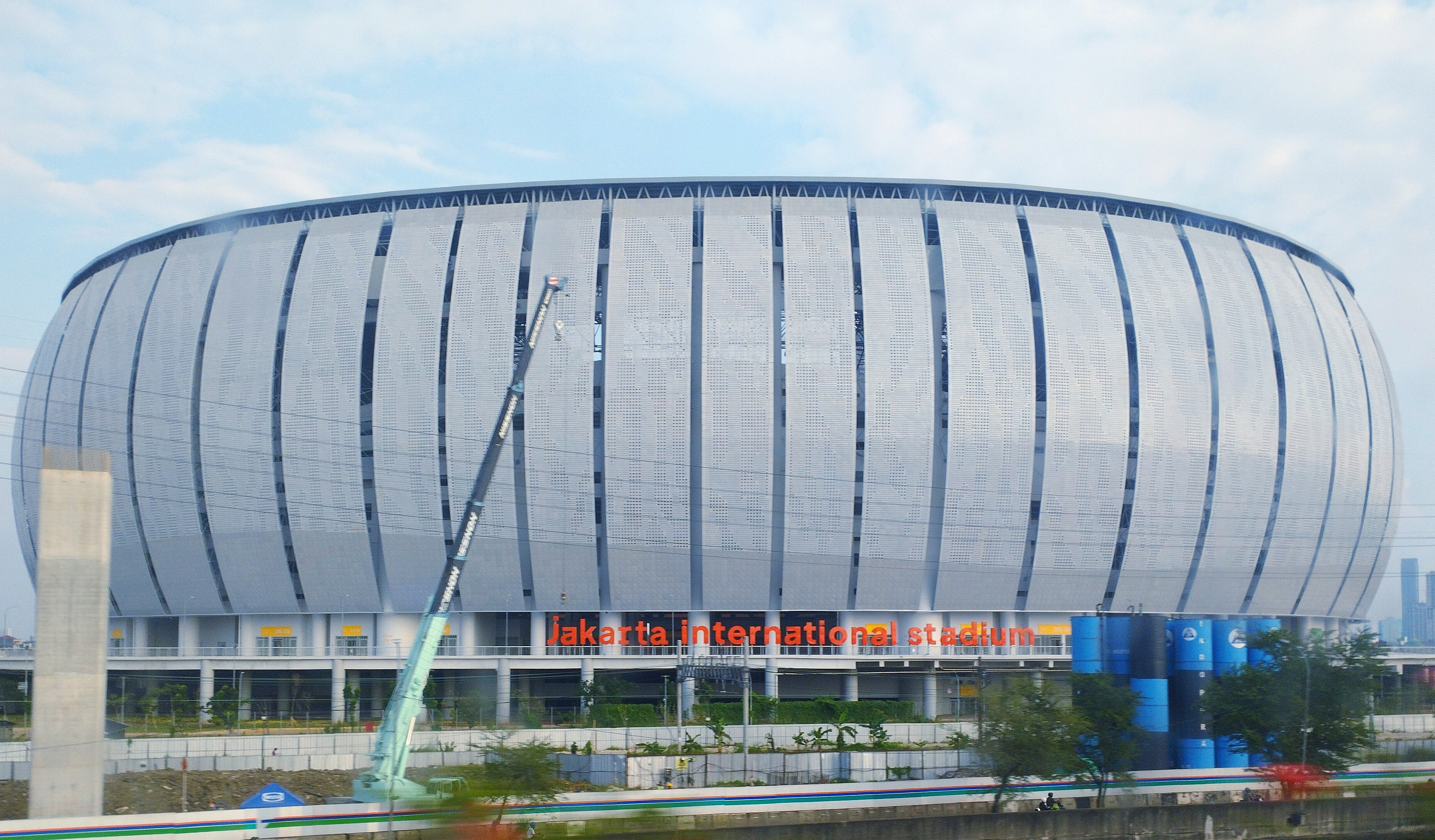
- JIS in 2023
- Interactive map of Jakarta International Stadium
- Former names: Jakarta BMW Stadium (planning phase)
- Location: Tanjung Priok, North Jakarta, Indonesia
- Coordinates: 6°7′28″S 106°51′37″E
- Owner: Government of Jakarta
- Operator: PT Jakarta Propertindo (JAKPRO)
- Capacity: 82,000
- Roof: Retractable
- Surface: GrassMaster
- Acreage: 221,000 m² (54.6 acres / 22.1 hectares)
- Public transit: Jakarta International Stadium; Jakarta International Stadium

Construction
- Groundbreaking: 14 March 2019; 7 years ago
- Built: September 2019 – April 2022
- Opened: 13 April 2022; 4 years ago (soft opening); 24 July 2022; 4 years ago (grand opening)
- Cost: Rp 4.5 trillion ($312 million)
- Architect: Pandega Desain Weharima (PDW)
- Main contractors: Joint operation by PT WIKA Gedung, PT PP (Pembangunan Perumahan) and PT Jaya Konstruksi

Tenants
- Persija Jakarta (2022–present); Indonesia national football team (selected matches)

Website
- jakartainternationalstadium.va.id

Jakarta International Stadium (JIS; Indonesian: Stadion Internasional Jakarta) is a retractable roof football stadium in Tanjung Priok, Jakarta, Indonesia. It is the home ground of Persija Jakarta after moving from their previous stadium, Gelora Bung Karno Stadium, and the occasional home of the Indonesia national football team, after an agreement between PSSI and PT JAKPRO to use the facility. The stadium has a seating capacity of 82,000 spectators, making it the largest stadium in Indonesia and largest football-specific stadium in Asia.

Construction of the stadium was delayed due to land disputes and class-action lawsuits by former squatters whose homes were demolished to make way for the stadium. Construction of the stadium started in September 2019 and completed in April 2022. After numerous delays and preparations, the stadium opened for its grand opening on 24 July 2022.

The stadium complex is built on 22 hectares of land and the stadium building itself is built on 375.7 m^{2} (4,044 sq ft). This stadium is the largest retractable roof stadium in the world by capacity.

== History ==
=== Pre-construction and planning ===
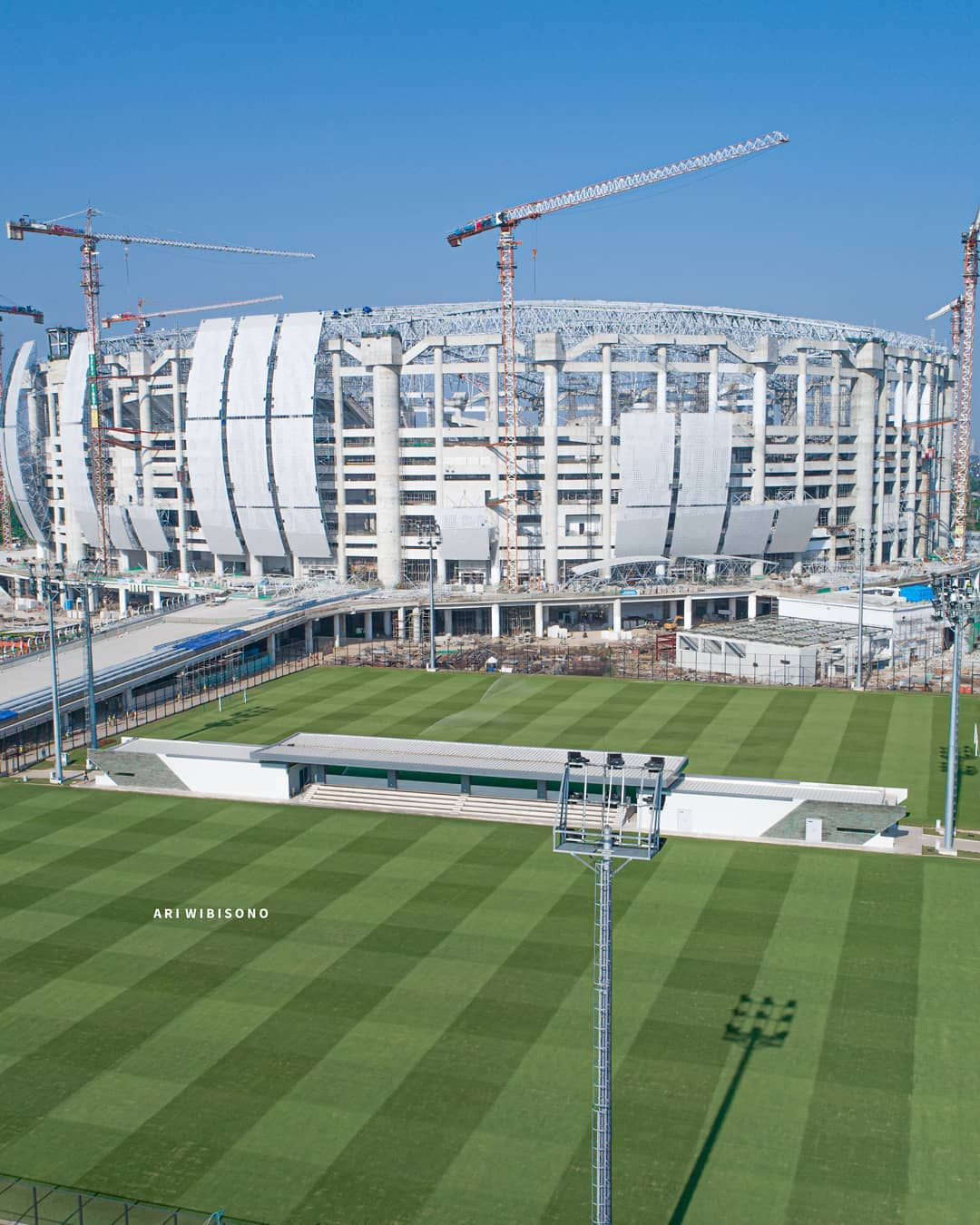
The stadium aerial view in 2021.

In the late 2000s to early 2010s, plans had emerged that a new home stadium for Persija Jakarta would be built in 26.5 hectares of land near the BMW Park (Indonesian: Taman BMW, stands for Bersih, Manusiawi dan Berwibawa) in Tanjung Priok, North Jakarta, where squatters had been illegally building homes for the last few years. The stadium was to be named 'BMW Stadium' after the aforementioned neighbouring park and was scheduled to be built by 2013 and completed by 2015. The stadium had a planned capacity of 50,000 and was originally planned to feature a running track. This stadium was to be a replacement of Lebak Bulus Stadium which was demolished for the Jakarta MRT train depot.

By 2014, the stadium's construction hadn't commenced since the owner of the land is still disputed by the former squatters and the city government. New plans had been discussed to build the stadium with a brand new design with 80,000 capacity for the 2018 Asian Games, but later the plans were cancelled and the government opted to renovate the Gelora Bung Karno Stadium later in 2016. It was during this time Secretary General of the PSSI DKI Jakarta Province Muchlas Rowi proposed the idea of DKI Jakarta having a new internationally capable stadium, which was realized in the era of DKI Jakarta Governor Anies Baswedan as the Jakarta International Stadium.

After multiple series of failed planning and construction, the land dispute was over and it was ready to be cleared for construction in 2017, and buildings of former squatters was later demolished. Two years after the land was cleared, an official plan was released for a stadium of 82,000 capacity with a retractable roof and without a running track, unlike the previous project designs over the years. The newly designed project was given the name 'Jakarta International Stadium' and broke ground on 14 March 2019 with Jakarta Governor Anies Baswedan kicking off the construction. Since the construction has started, the affected neighbouring residents of Kampung Bayam has asked for compensation for damages and most residents has moved out of the area.

=== Construction ===
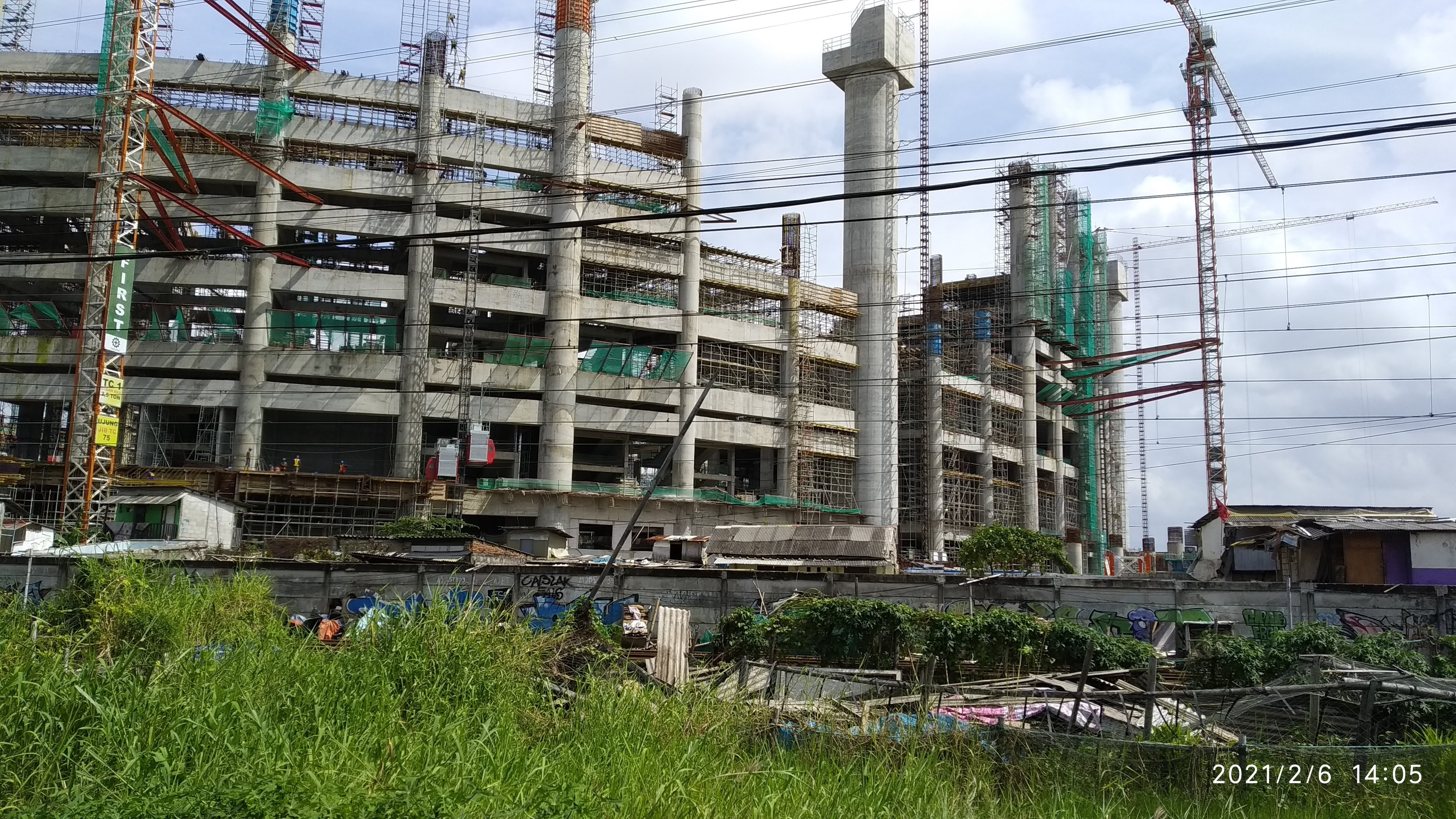
The construction of the stadium seen from RE Martadinata Street in February 2021.

The stadium construction started in September 2019. The construction of the stadium hasn't been halted amid the COVID-19 pandemic, albeit safety precautions and medical check-ups for workers has been implemented. Due to the pandemic, the construction progress slowed down caused by the decrease of construction workers and delay of construction materials being shipped and transported for the project. This problem has pushed the estimated opening date from October 2021 to April 2022.

On 4 June 2021, the lifting of the steel roof truss began. The three-phased lifting was completed on 17 June 2021, just under 2 weeks after it was started. The main truss has a total mass of 3,900 tons and has a length of 70 metres (230 ft). Jakarta Governor Anies Baswedan claimed that the lifting was the biggest and heaviest ever done on a stadium roof in the world, and earned a MURI record for the Heaviest Lifting of Stadium Roof Structure on 28 July 2021. The stadium also earned two other records for the First Retractable Roof Stadium in Indonesia and the First Stadium to be a Platinum Green Building in Indonesia certified using GREENSHIP Rating Tool of Green Building Council Indonesia (GBC Indonesia).

On 10 December 2021, the construction of the sheet metal roof has been completed, while the stadium has reached 87,85% completion. The next day, the sound system, floodlights, and hybrid grass was tested, with Fadly, the vocalist of rock band Padi, performing for the construction workers in the stadium.

=== Opening ===
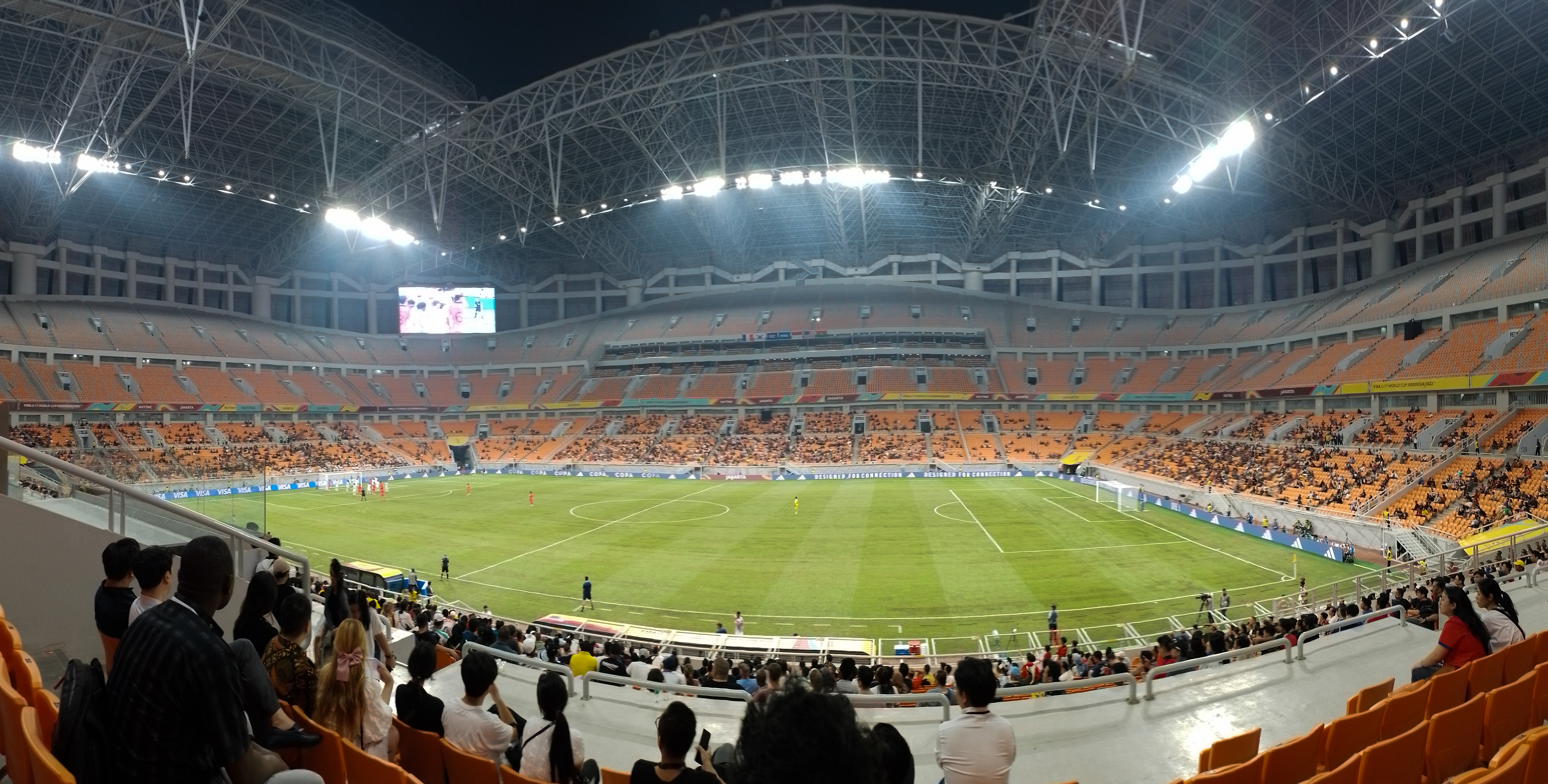
The Jakarta International Stadium during the 2023 FIFA U-17 World Cup group stage match between South Korea and the United States.

The stadium was planned to have a soft opening on 11 December 2021, but a week before the opening, the government decided to postpone it due to the Omicron variant outbreak. The soft opening date was delayed to 6 February 2022, but was later delayed again due to rising COVID-19 cases.

The stadium finally had its soft opening on 13 April 2022, to coincide with the first matchday of the 2021 International Youth Championship, a friendly cup participated by the youth teams of Indonesia, Barcelona, Bali United, and Atlético Madrid. It was held from 13 to 19 April 2022. The group stage matches of the championship was scheduled to be held in the newly renovated Kapten I Wayan Dipta Stadium in Bali, but the stadium was withdrawn due to COVID-19 restrictions. The competition was hosted in the stadium to "show the world that European-quality stadiums will be an icon of Indonesia" said Gede Widiade, the chairman of Pancoran Soccer Field, the organizer of the event. On 19 April, Barcelona U-18 won the competition after winning 1–0 in the final match against Atlético Madrid U-18.

The stadium hosted the closing ceremony event for the 495th anniversary of Jakarta on 25 June 2022. On 24 July 2022, the stadium had its grand opening, with the main event being a pre-season friendly match between Persija Jakarta against Chonburi F.C.

== Facilities ==
Jakarta International Stadium is built to FIFA standards and is also able to accommodate various non-sporting uses, such as music concerts and art events. The stadium complex also has outdoor training fields and is planned to include additional developments. The wide pedestrian ramp connects the stadium complex to the nearby BMW Park, a planned agritourist development connecting the stadium complex with the neighbouring Cincin reservoir and urban forest.

The stadium has three-tiered stands with a total capacity of 82,000 spectators. The total height of the stadium is 73 metres (240 ft) tall, making it one of the tallest stadiums in the world. The stadium façade features a tiger-striped-styled pattern that references Persija's color and mascot, while the stadium shape itself is inspired by traditional Betawi clothing.

The stadium's playing field is 105 m × 68 m (344 ft × 223 ft) per FIFA regulations, and uses a hybrid grass surface. The hybrid grass is a combination of zoysia matrella grass and Limonta Mixto artificial turf imported from Italy that is also used in the outdoor training fields. However, while preparing for the 2023 FIFA U-17 World Cup, FIFA released an inspection report which revealed that the grass is not up to the FIFA Standard. This prompts the Government to re-evaluate and consolidate in order to improve access and infrastructure to the stadium. It is the first football stadium in Indonesia to have a semi-artificial surface. Both training pitches and the main pitch were all constructed by PT. In an unorthodox approach to field maintenance, pied stilt birds are let out daily to eat pests, avoiding the need for pesticides.

The retractable roof is made of an ETFE membrane and is 100 metres (330 ft) long. It is also the first football stadium to have a retractable roof in Indonesia and the second football stadium in Southeast Asia to feature a retractable roof after Singapore National Stadium.

=== JIS Sky View Deck ===
Jakarta International Stadium features a sky-viewing observation deck on the side of the retractable roof, the first stadium to have one in Southeast Asia. The deck is 70 metres (230 ft) or 20 stories high above the ground that offers a 180-degree view of the Ancol complex and the rest of the North Jakarta area. The deck can be used for jogging and climbing.

== Association football ==
=== 2023 FIFA U-17 World Cup ===
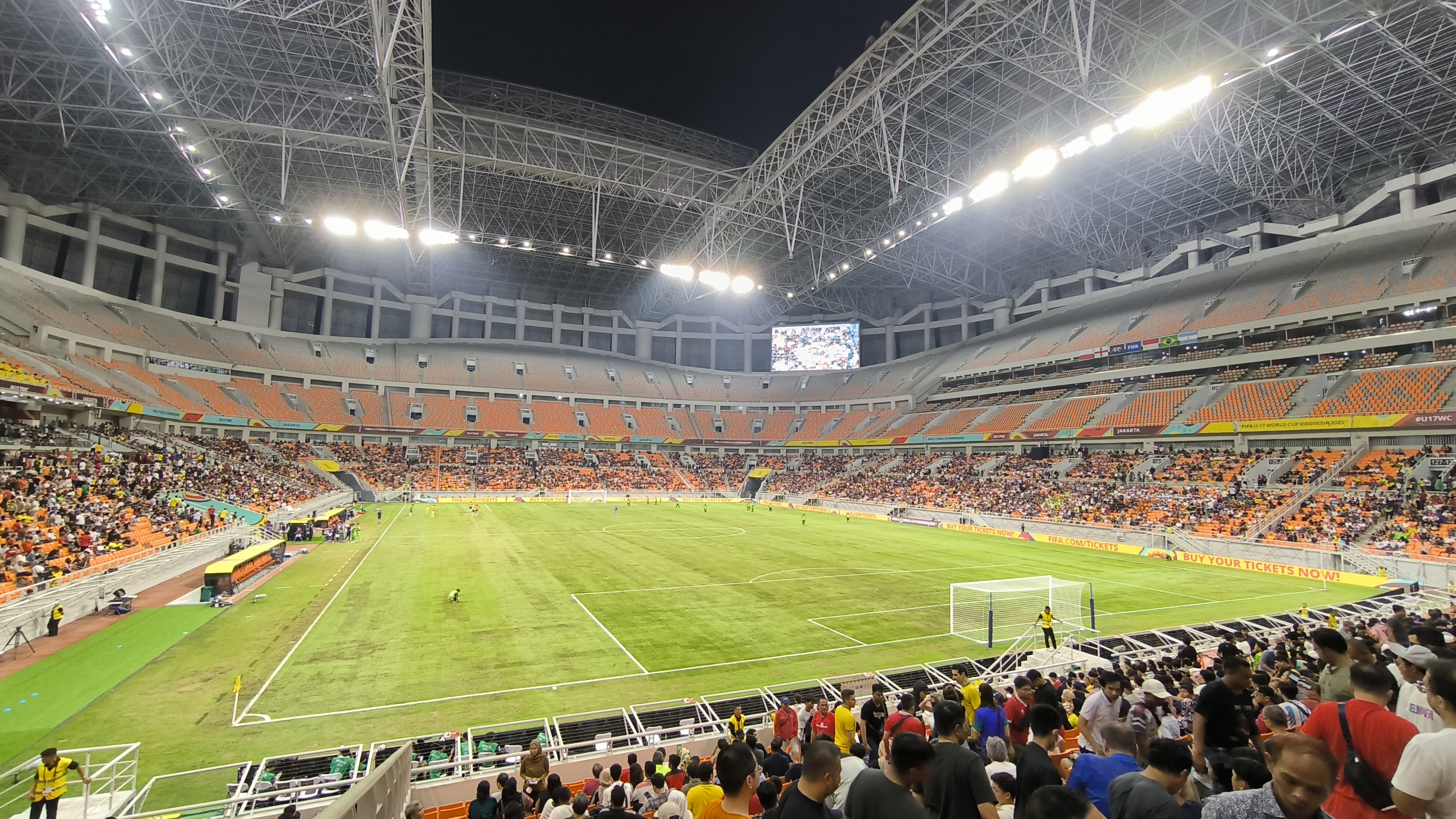
The stadium during 2023 FIFA U-17 World Cup match between Brazil and England.

Jakarta International Stadium hosted 16 matches during the 2023 FIFA U-17 World Cup, more than any other stadiums selected to host the tournament. The stadium capacity for the tournament was reduced to 23,422 seats as only the lowest tier of the stadium was utilized.

| Date | Time (UTC+7) | Team No. 1 | Result | Team No. 2 | Round | Attendance |
|---|---|---|---|---|---|---|
| 11 November 2023 | 16:00 | New Caledonia | 0–10 | England | Group C | 6,684 |
| 11 November 2023 | 19:00 | Brazil | 2–3 | Iran | Group C | 9,283 |
| 12 November 2023 | 16:00 | France | 3–0 | Burkina Faso | Group E | 7,033 |
| 12 November 2023 | 19:00 | South Korea | 1–3 | United States | Group E | 4,317 |
| 14 November 2023 | 16:00 | Brazil | 9–0 | New Caledonia | Group C | 4,529 |
| 14 November 2023 | 19:00 | England | 2–1 | Iran | Group C | 7,698 |
| 15 November 2023 | 16:00 | United States | 2–1 | Burkina Faso | Group E | 3,235 |
| 15 November 2023 | 19:00 | France | 1–0 | South Korea | Group E | 7,476 |
| 17 November 2023 | 16:00 | Poland | 0–4 | Argentina | Group D | 7,663 |
| 17 November 2023 | 19:00 | England | 1–2 | Brazil | Group C | 15,171 |
| 18 November 2023 | 16:00 | Germany | 3–0 | Venezuela | Group F | 11,265 |
| 18 November 2023 | 19:00 | United States | 0–3 | France | Group E | 14,436 |
| 22 November 2023 | 15:30 | England | 1–2 | Uzbekistan | Round of 16 | 7,014 |
| 22 November 2023 | 19:00 | France | 0–0 (5–3 p) | Senegal | Round of 16 | 12,238 |
| 24 November 2023 | 15:30 | Spain | 0–1 | Germany | Quarter-final | 8,379 |
| 24 November 2023 | 19:30 | Brazil | 0–3 | Argentina | Quarter-final | 14,597 |

== Entertainment events ==
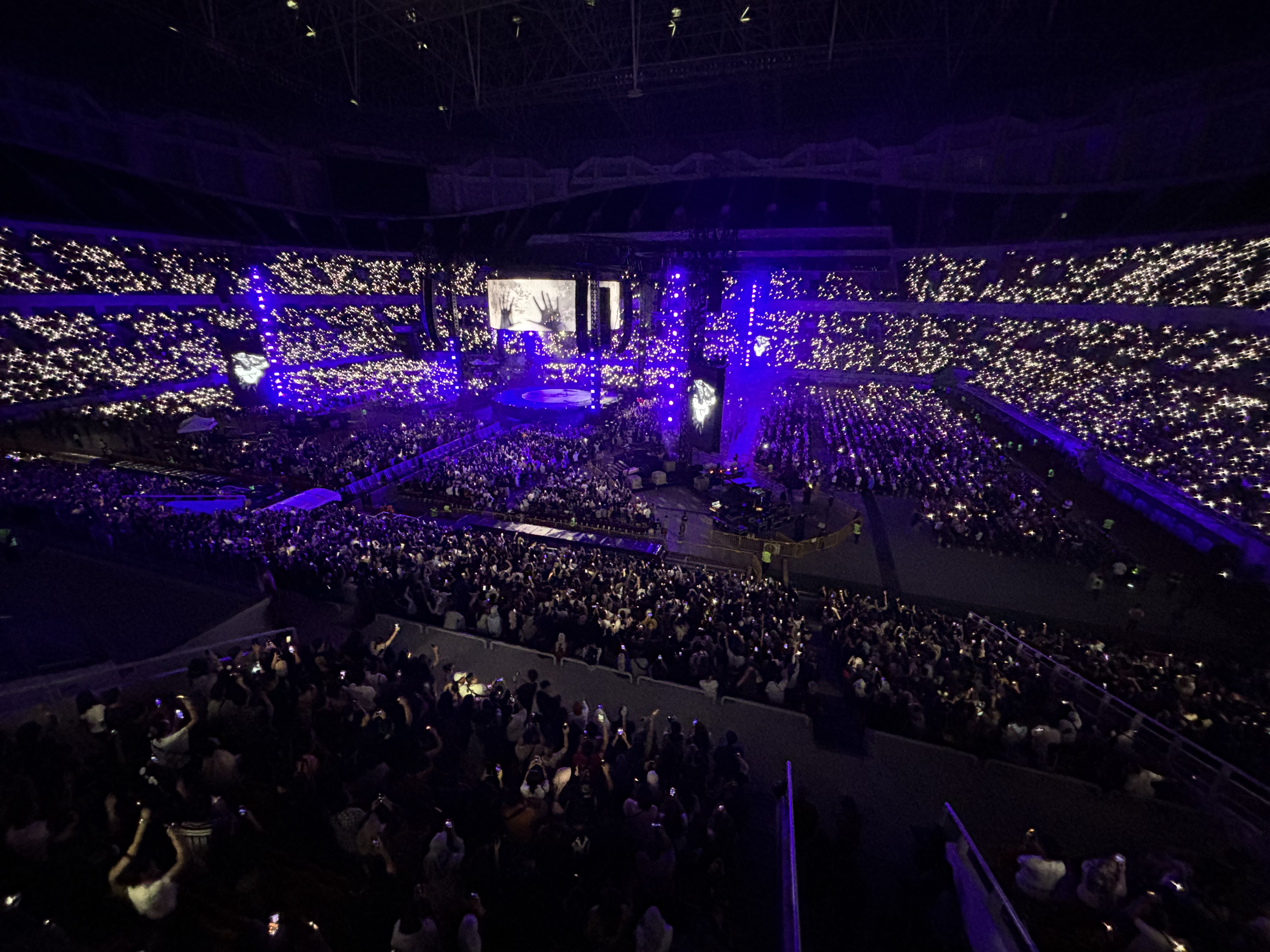
Ed Sheeran concert in 2024, as part of his +−=÷× Tour.

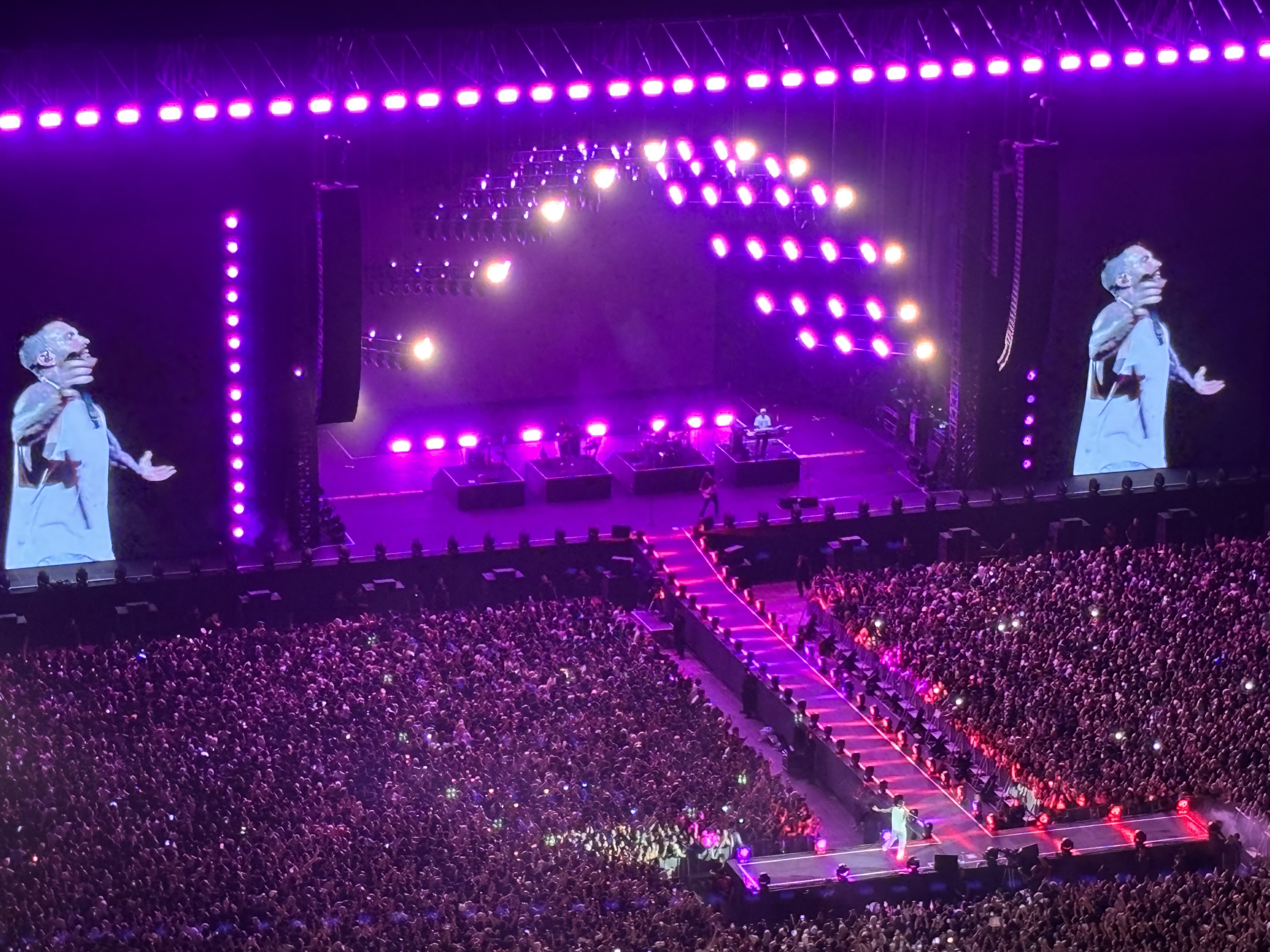
Maroon 5 concert in 2025.

| Date | Artist(s) | Event | Attendance | Revenue | Ref. |
2023
| 4 February | Dewa 19 | Pesta Rakyat 30 Tahun Berkarya Dewa 19 | 75,000 | — | |
| 23 December | Twice | Ready to Be World Tour | 21,954 / 28,290 | $3,544,506 | |
2024
| 6 January | Enhypen; NewJeans; STAYC; Stray Kids; Zerobaseone; Seventeen; BoyNextDoor; Fifty Fifty; Ive; Le Sserafim; YB; La Poem; Parc Jae Jung; Tomorrow X Together; Psick Univ | 38th Golden Disc Awards | — | — | |
| 2 March | Ed Sheeran | +–=÷× Tour | 45,136 / 50,766 | $5,796,589 | |
| 11 September | Bruno Mars | Bruno Mars Live | 142,000 / 142,000 | $21,500,000 | |
| 13 September | Bruno Mars | Bruno Mars Live | 142,000 / 142,000 | $21,500,000 | |
| 14 September | Bruno Mars | Bruno Mars Live | 142,000 / 142,000 | $21,500,000 | |
2025
| 1 February | Maroon 5 | Asia Tour: Live in Jakarta | 10,000 / 10,000 | — | |
| 8 February | Seventeen | Right Here World Tour | — | — | |
| 9 February | Seventeen | Right Here World Tour | — | — | |
| 27 September | NCT Dream | The Dream Show 4: Dream the Future | — | — | |
| 28 September | NCT Dream | The Dream Show 4: Dream the Future | — | — | |
2026
| 26 September | The Weeknd | After Hours til Dawn Tour | — | — | |
| 27 September | The Weeknd | After Hours til Dawn Tour | — | — | |
| 10 October | Avenged Sevenfold | 2026 Asia Tour | — | — | |
| 22 November | My Chemical Romance | Long Live The Black Parade | — | — | |
2027
| 16 January | BigBang | XX: Cosmos World Tour | — | — | |
| 23 January | Enhypen | Blood Saga Tour | — | — | |
| 5 February | Maroon 5 | Maroon 5 Asia 2027 Tour | — | — | |

=== Cancelled entertainment events ===
| Date | Artist | Concert | Reason | Ref |
|---|---|---|---|---|
| 3 May 2025 | Day6 | Forever Young World Tour | Scheduling conflict with Persija Jakarta matches, concert relocated to Gelora Bung Karno Madya Stadium | |

== Transport ==
The stadium is connected with a KRL Commuterline Pink Line infill station with the same name as the stadium is located next into the line. A Jakarta LRT station is also planned to enhance connectivity. Three Transjakarta BRT routes from JIS to Senen, Monumen Nasional and Tanjung Priok are currently operational. The Jakarta Inner Ring Road passes next to the stadium.
