= 2025–26 Persebaya Surabaya season =

Persebaya Surabaya
2025–26 season
- Owner: Koperasi Surya Abadi Persebaya (30%); PT DBL Indonesia (70%)
- President: Azrul Ananda
- Head coach: (Spain) Eduardo Pérez (until 22 November 2025) (Indonesia) Uston Nawawi (caretaker) (Portugal) Bernardo Tavares (from 22 December 2025)
- Stadium: Gelora Bung Tomo
- Super League: 5th
- Top goalscorer: Francisco Rivera (12)
- Highest home attendance: 33,432 vs Persija Jakarta (18 October 2025)
- Lowest home attendance: 7,527 vs PSM Makassar (25 February 2026)
- Average home league attendance: 22,709
- Biggest win: 4–0 (three times) (Note: Match against Persijap Jepara (28 December 2025), Arema (28 April 2026) and PSBS Biak (2 May 2026).)
- Biggest defeat: 1–5 vs Borneo Samarinda (7 March 2026)
Home colours	Away colours	Third colours
- All statistics correct as of 2 May 2026.

The 2025–26 season was Persebaya Surabaya's 98th season in existence and its 8th consecutive seasons in top-flight following its success in getting promoted from the 2017 Liga 2. This was Persebaya Surabaya's first season under new head coach Eduardo Pérez.

Eduardo Pérez was dismissed in November following a draw to Arema. The club was 8th on the league table, having already suffered 3 loss, 4 draws and only 4 wins from 11 games. Former Persebaya player and assistant coach, Uston Nawawi, took over as interim head coach during the vacancy.

On 22 December 2025, Persebaya announced Bernardo Tavares as their new head coach, following his departure from PSM Makassar.

== Squad ==
As of 15 August 2025

No.	Player	Nationality	Date of birth (age)	Previous club	Notes
Goalkeepers
21	Ernando Ari	(Indonesia)	27 February 2002 (age 24)	(Indonesia) Persebaya U-20	
39	Ilham Al-Arif	(Indonesia)	7 May 2007 (age 19)	(Indonesia) Persebaya U-20	
52	Andhika Ramadhani	(Indonesia)	5 January 1999 (age 27)	(Indonesia) Persebaya U-20	
Defenders
2	Arief Catur	(Indonesia)	25 July 1999 (age 26)	(Indonesia) Persikab Bandung	
5	Risto Mitrevski	(North Macedonia)	5 October 1991 (age 34)	(Indonesia) Dewa United	
17	Jefferson Silva	(Brazil)	3 January 1997 (age 29)	(Brazil) Operário PR	Midseason transfer
18	Randy May	(Indonesia)	21 September 2000 (age 25)	(Indonesia) Persiba Balikpapan	
24	Léo Lelis	(Brazil)	15 November 1993 (age 32)	(Indonesia) Persijap Jepara	
25	Mikael Tata	(Indonesia)	10 May 2004 (age 22)	(Indonesia) Arema Malang	
33	Koko Ari	(Indonesia)	9 January 2000 (age 26)	(Indonesia) Dewa United	
44	Gustavo Fernandes	(Brazil)	5 July 1999 (age 26)	(Portugal) F.C. Penafiel	Midseason transfer
66	Sheva Kardanu	(Indonesia)	24 January 2005 (age 21)	(Indonesia) Persebaya U-20	
Midfielders
7	Francisco Rivera	(Mexico)	23 September 1994 (age 31)	(Indonesia) Madura United	
12	Alfan Suaib	(Indonesia)	24 March 2004 (age 22)	(Indonesia) Persebaya U-20	
16	Pedro Matos	(Portugal)	11 May 1998 (age 28)	(Indonesia) Semen Padang	Loaned from Semen Padang
26	Dimas Wicaksono	(Indonesia)	16 July 2007 (age 18)	(Indonesia) Persebaya U-20	
53	Rachmat Irianto	(Indonesia)	3 September 1999 (age 26)	(Indonesia) Persib Bandung	
55	Sadida Nugraha	(Indonesia)	26 April 2005 (age 21)	(Indonesia) Persebaya U-20	
68	Toni Firmansyah	(Indonesia)	14 January 2005 (age 21)	(Indonesia) Persebaya U-20	
81	Ichsas Baihaqi	(Indonesia)	17 March 2007 (age 19)	(Indonesia) Persebaya U-20	
88	Miloš Raičković	(Montenegro)	2 December 1993 (age 32)	(Montenegro) Otrant Olympic	
Forwards
8	Oktafianus Fernando	(Indonesia)	4 October 1993 (age 32)	(Indonesia) Persipal Palu	
10	Bruno Moreira	(Brazil)	8 April 1999 (age 27)	(Greece) Niki Volos	
11	Mihailo Perović	(Montenegro)	23 January 1997 (age 29)	(Montenegro) FK Jezero	
22	Gali Freitas	(Timor-Leste)	31 December 2004 (age 21)	(Indonesia) PSIS Semarang	
77	Malik Risaldi	(Indonesia)	23 October 1996 (age 29)	(Indonesia) Madura United	
83	Bruno Paraíba	(Brazil)	20 July 1994 (age 31)	(South Korea) Cheonan City FC	Midseason transfer
Left during the season
27	Rendy Oscario	(Indonesia)	7 October 1998 (age 27)	(Indonesia) Persita Tangerang	Loaned to Semen Padang
23	Kadek Raditya	(Indonesia)	13 June 1999 (age 27)	(Indonesia) Madura United	Loaned to Persis Solo
9	Rizky Dwi Pangestu	(Indonesia)	9 April 1999 (age 27)	(Indonesia) PSIS Semarang	Loaned to Garudayaksa
4	Dime Dimov	(North Macedonia)	25 July 1994 (age 31)	(Bulgaria) Lokomotiv Sofia	Released
91	Dejan Tumbas	(Serbia)	5 August 1999 (age 26)	(Tajikistan) FK Khujand	Released
99	Diego Maurício	(Brazil)	25 June 1991 (age 35)	(India) Odisha FC	Released

== Coaching staff ==
Position	Name
Head coach	(Portugal) Bernardo Tavares
Assistant coach	(Portugal) Paulo Renato Gonçalves Duarte
Assistant coach	(Indonesia) Uston Nawawi
Goalkeeper Coach	(Brazil) Felipe Americo Martins
Fitness coach	(South Korea) Shin Sang-gyu
Team Doctor	(Indonesia) Ahmad Ridhoi
Team Physiotherapist	(Indonesia) Dominggus Ruku Yudit (Indonesia) Samudra Anggara
Under-20's Head coach	(Indonesia) Sony Setiawan
Under-18's Head coach	(Indonesia) Mat Halil
Under-16's Head coach	(Indonesia) Khabib Syukron
Under-13's Head coach	(Indonesia) Dani Cantona

== Transfers ==
=== In ===
Date	Pos.	Player	From	Notes	Ref.
Pre-season
1 June 2025	GK	(Indonesia) Miftakhul Yunan	(Indonesia) Persipasi Kota Bekasi	Loans returned	
1 June 2025	MF	(Indonesia) Risky Dwiyan	(Indonesia) Persikab Bandung	Loans returned	
1 June 2025	MF	(Portugal) Zé Valente	(Indonesia) Persik Kediri	Loans returned	
3 June 2025	DF	(Indonesia) Koko Ari	(Indonesia) Madura United	Transfer	
3 June 2025	DF	(North Macedonia) Risto Mitrevski	(Indonesia) Dewa United Banten	Transfer	
3 June 2025	FW	(Timor-Leste) Gali Freitas	(Indonesia) PSIS Semarang	Transfer	
18 June 2025	DF	(Indonesia) Rachmat Irianto	(Indonesia) Persib Bandung	Transfer	
23 June 2025	MF	(Montenegro) Miloš Raičković	(Montenegro) Otrant-Olympic	Transfer	
1 July 2025	GK	(Indonesia) Ilham Al-Arif	(Indonesia) Persebaya U-20	Promoted	
1 July 2025	DF	(Indonesia) Sheva Kardanu	(Indonesia) Persebaya U-20	Promoted	
1 July 2025	MF	(Indonesia) Dimas Wicaksono	(Indonesia) Persebaya U-20	Promoted	
1 July 2025	MF	(Indonesia) Ichsas Baihaqi	(Indonesia) Persebaya U-20	Promoted	
1 July 2025	MF	(Indonesia) Sadida Nugraha	(Indonesia) Persebaya U-20	Promoted	
15 July 2025	FW	(Montenegro) Mihailo Perović	(Montenegro) FK Jezero	Transfer	
15 July 2025	GK	(Indonesia) Rendy Oscario	(Indonesia) Persita Tangerang	Transfer	
19 July 2025	DF	(Indonesia) Fedly Damara	(Indonesia) Persebaya U-20	Promoted	
19 July 2025	MF	(Indonesia) Alfredo Nararya	(Indonesia) Persebaya U-20	Promoted	
19 July 2025	FW	(Indonesia) Jay Amru	(Indonesia) Persebaya U-20	Promoted	
5 August 2025	FW	(Brazil) Léo Lelis	(Indonesia) Persijap Jepara	Transfer	
22 August 2025	FW	(Brazil) Diego Maurício	(India) Odisha	Transfer	
Mid-season				Transfer	
7 January 2026	FW	(Brazil) Bruno Paraíba	(South Korea) Cheonan City	Transfer	
7 January 2026	DF	(Brazil) Jefferson Silva	(Brazil) Operário PR	Transfer	
10 January 2026	DF	(Brazil) Gustavo Fernandes	(Portugal) Penafiel	Transfer	
23 January 2026	MF	(Portugal) Pedro Matos	(Indonesia) Semen Padang	Loan in	
5 February 2026	GK	(Indonesia) Adre Arido	(Indonesia) Persija Jakarta	Transfer	
5 February 2026	FW	(Indonesia) Riyan Ardiansyah	(Indonesia) Malut United	Loan in	
6 February 2026	DF	(Indonesia) Ilham Akbar	(Indonesia) Persebaya U-20	Promoted	

=== Out ===
Date	Pos.	Player	To	Notes	Ref.
Pre-season
1 June 2025	GK	(Indonesia) Aditya Arya	(Indonesia) PSPS Pekanbaru	Released	
1 June 2025	GK	(Indonesia) Lalu Rizki	(Indonesia) PSIS Semarang	Released	
1 June 2025	DF	(Montenegro) Slavko Damjanović	(Indonesia) Bhayangkara Presisi Lampung	Released	
1 June 2025	DF	(Indonesia) Riswan Lauhin	(Indonesia) Malut United	Released	
1 June 2025	MF	(Indonesia) Andre Oktaviansyah	(Indonesia) PSBS Biak	Released	
1 June 2025	MF	(Portugal) Gilson Costa	Free agent	Released	
1 June 2025	MF	(Indonesia) Muhammad Hidayat	(Indonesia) PSMS Medan	Released	
1 June 2025	FW	(Indonesia) Kasim Botan	(Indonesia) PSIM Yogyakarta	Released	
1 June 2025	FW	(Palestine) Mohammed Rashid	(India) East Bengal	Released	
1 June 2025	MF	(Indonesia) Ardi Idrus	(Indonesia) Bali United	End of loan	
27 June 2025	MF	(Portugal) Zé Valente	(Indonesia) PSIM Yogyakarta	Released	
1 July 2025	FW	(Guinea-Bissau) Flávio Silva	(South Africa) Kaizer Chiefs	Released	
1 July 2025	GK	(Indonesia) Miftakhul Yunan	Free agent	Released	
1 July 2025	MF	(Indonesia) Risky Dwiyan	Free agent	Released	
1 August 2025	FW	(Indonesia) Widi Syarief	(Indonesia) PSIS Semarang	Released	
1 August 2025	FW	(Indonesia) Jay Amru	(Indonesia) Persipal Palu	Released	
11 September 2025	DF	(Indonesia) Fedly Damara	(Indonesia) Persekat Tegal	Loaned out	
Mid-season
13 January 2026	FW	(Indonesia) Rizky Dwi Pangestu	(Indonesia) Garudayaksa	Loaned out	
15 January 2026	GK	(Indonesia) Rendy Oscario	(Indonesia) Semen Padang	Loaned out	
21 January 2026	DF	(Indonesia) Kadek Raditya	(Indonesia) Persis Solo	Loaned out	
22 January 2026	FW	(Brazil) Diego Maurício	Free agent	Released	
22 January 2026	FW	(Serbia) Dejan Tumbas	Free agent	Released	
22 January 2026	DF	(North Macedonia) Dime Dimov	Free agent	Released	

== Pre-season ==
Win Draw Loss

=== Friendly matches ===
9 July 2025 Friendly	Football West All Star	0–2	Persebaya Surabaya	Perth, Australia
20:00 UTC+8 (19:00 UTC+7)		Report	Rivera 61'; Rizky Dwi 90+3'	Stadium: Sam Kerr Football Centre

15 July 2025 Friendly	Persebaya Surabaya	1–0	Persik Kediri	Surabaya
		Report		Stadium: Gelora 10 November; Attendance: 0 (Note: The match was played behind closed doors.)

19 July 2025 Friendly	Persebaya Surabaya	1–0	PSS Sleman	Surabaya
19:00 UTC+7	Bruno 72'	Report		Stadium: Gelora Bung Tomo

== Competitions ==
=== Overview ===
Competition	First match	Last match	Starting round	Final position	Record							
Competition	First match	Last match	Starting round	Final position	Pld	W	D	L	GF	GA	GD	Win %
Indonesia Super League	8 August 2025	23 May 2026	Matchday 1	4th	34	16	10	8	61	35	+26	47.06
Total					34	16	10	8	61	35	+26	47.06

Source: Competitions

=== League table ===
Pos	Team	Pld	W	D	L	GF	GA	GD	Pts	Qualification or relegation
2	Borneo Samarinda	34	25	4	5	74	31	+43	79 (Note: Head-to-head points: Persib 4, Borneo Samarinda 1.)	Qualification for the AFC Challenge League and ASEAN Club Championship group stage
3	Persija	34	22	5	7	65	29	+36	71	
4	Persebaya	34	16	10	8	61	35	+26	58	
5	Bhayangkara Presisi	34	16	5	13	53	45	+8	53 (Note: Head-to-head points: Bhayangkara Presisi 9, Malut United 6, Dewa United Banten 3.)	
6	Malut United	34	15	8	11	68	53	+15	53	

Source: Super League 2025–26
Rules for classification: 1) Points; 2) Head-to-head points; 3) Head-to-head goal difference; 4) Head-to-head goals scored; 5) Goal difference; 6) Goals scored; 7) Fair-play points; 8) Draw.

=== Results summary ===
Overall								Home						Away					
Pld	W	D	L	GF	GA	GD	Pts	W	D	L	GF	GA	GD	W	D	L	GF	GA	GD
31	14	9	8	49	35	+14	51	8	4	4	29	18	+11	6	5	4	20	17	+3

=== Results by matchday ===
Matchday	1	2	3	5	6	7	9	10	11	12	13	14	4 (Note: The match was postponed due to the August 2025 Indonesian protests.)	15	8 (Note: The match was originally scheduled for 2 October 2025, but was postponed as a form of full support for the Indonesia national football team in the fourth round of the 2026 FIFA World Cup qualification.)	16	17	18	19	20	21	22	23	24	25	26	27	28	29	30	31
Ground	H	A	H	A	H	A	H	A	H	A	H	A	A	H	H	A	H	A	H	A	H	A	A	H	A	H	A	H	A	A	H
Result	L	W	W	L	W	D	L	D	W	D	D	D	D	D	W	W	W	W	D	W	L	L	W	D	L	W	L	L	W	W	W
Position	13	10	4	5	8	5	5	10	10	9	8	8	9	9	7	7	7	6	5	5	5	5	5	5	7	6	6	6	6	5	5
Points	0	3	6	6	9	10	10	11	14	15	16	17	18	19	22	25	28	31	32	35	35	35	38	39	39	42	42	42	45	48	51

Updated to match(es) played on 2 May 2026. Source: All matches
A = Away; H = Home; W = Win; D = Draw; L = Loss

=== Matches ===
Win Draw Loss Rescheduled

==== First round ====
8 August 2025 1	Persebaya Surabaya	0–1	PSIM Yogyakarta	Surabaya
19:00 UTC+7	Toni (yellow card) 10'	(LIB) (ILMS)	Reva (yellow card) 53'; Vidal 90+2'; Haljeta (yellow card) 90+6'	Stadium: Gelora Bung Tomo; Attendance: 17,456; Referee: Rio Permana Putra

16 August 2025 2	Persita Tangerang	0–1	Persebaya Surabaya	Tangerang
15:30 UTC+7	Ganet (yellow card) 43'; Bessa (yellow card) 43'; Guseynov (yellow card) 61'	(LIB) (LIBMS)	Rivera 23'; Catur (yellow card) 70'	Stadium: Indomilk Arena; Attendance: 2,831; Referee: Yudi Nurcahya

23 August 2025 3	Persebaya Surabaya	5–2	Bali United	Surabaya
19:00 UTC+7	Catur (yellow card) 11'; Rivera 38'; Mitrevski 44'; Perović 53'; Bruno 61' (pen.); Toni (yellow card) 81'; Freitas 82'	(LIB) (LIBMS)	Wilson (yellow card) 32'; Kopitović 45'; Irfan Jaya 54'; Fajrin (yellow card) 58'; Goppel (yellow card) 73'	Stadium: Gelora Bung Tomo; Attendance: 10,200; Referee: Yudai Yamamoto (Japan)

12 September 2025 5	Persib Bandung	1–0	Persebaya Surabaya	Bandung
15:30 UTC+7	Klok (yellow card) 41'; Putros (yellow card) 52'; Barros 53'; Luciano (yellow card) 73' (yellow-red card) 90+1'	(LIB) (LIBMS)	Mitrevski (yellow card) 5'; Toni (yellow card) 26'; Irianto (yellow card) 84'; Rivera (red card) 90+1'	Stadium: Gelora Bandung Lautan Api; Attendance: 10,691; Referee: Muhammad Tri Santoso

19 September 2025 6	Persebaya Surabaya	1–0	Semen Padang	Surabaya
19:00 UTC+7	Bruno 78'	(LIB) (ILMS)	Rui Pedro (yellow card) 58'; Samuel S. (yellow card) 64'	Stadium: Gelora Bung Tomo; Attendance: 9,321; Referee: Thoriq Alkatiri

26 September 2025 7	Dewa United Banten	1–1	Persebaya Surabaya	Serang
19:00 UTC+7	Wahyu (yellow card) 44'; Septian 71'	(LIB) (LIBMS)	Tumbas (red card) 37'; Bruno 90+10' (pen.)	Stadium: Banten International Stadium; Attendance: 2,021; Referee: Yudi Nurcahya

18 October 2025 9	Persebaya Surabaya	1–3	Persija Jakarta	Surabaya
19:00 UTC+7	Bruno (yellow card) 19'; Lelis 77'; Irianto (yellow card) 45+10'	(LIB) (ILMS)	Dony Tri 21'; Rio Fahmi (yellow card) 40'; Eduardo (yellow card) 45'; Amat 45+3', (yellow card) 45+9'; Allano (yellow card) 27', (goal) 74' (pen.)	Stadium: Gelora Bung Tomo; Attendance: 33,432; Referee: Irfan Wahyu Wijanarko

24 October 2025 10	PSBS Biak	0–0	Persebaya Surabaya	Sleman
15:30 UTC+7	Alom (yellow card) 46'; Barbosa (yellow card) 50'; Nurhidayat (yellow card) 66' (yellow-red card) 76'; Andre (yellow card) 90+4'	(LIB) (ILMS)	Lelis (red card) 32'; Tata (yellow card) 39' (yellow-red card) 45'; Dimov (yellow card) 90+3'; Rivera (yellow card) 90+4'	Stadium: Maguwoharjo; Attendance: 0 Referee: Axel Febrian Sinaga

2 November 2025 11	Persebaya Surabaya	2–1	Persis Solo	Surabaya
19:00 UTC+7	Mihailo Perović 45'; Francisco Rivera 51'	Report	Kodai Tanaka 15'; Arapenta (yellow card) 76'	Stadium: Gelora Bung Tomo; Attendance: 9,428; Referee: Naufal Adya Fairuski

7 November 2025 12	Persik Kediri	1–1	Persebaya Surabaya	Gresik
19:00 UTC+7	Bayu Otto (yellow card) 16'; Kiko (yellow card) 27'; José Enrique 63'; Mukhtorov (yellow card) 67'; P. Matos (yellow card) 84'	(LIB) (ILMS)	Bruno (yellow card) 43'; Catur 54'; Rivera (red card) 76'	Stadium: Gelora Joko Samudro; Attendance: 1,554; Referee: Nendi Rohaendi

22 November 2025 13	Persebaya Surabaya	1–1	Arema	Surabaya
15:30 UTC+7	Freitas (yellow card) 56'; Raičković (yellow card) 71'; Bruno 73' (yellow card) 80'	(LIB) (ILMS)	Frigeri (yellow card) 26'; Dalberto (yellow card) 37'; Rifad (yellow card) 45+5'; Salim (yellow card) 61'; Dimov 63' (o.g.); Blade (yellow card) 13' (yellow-red card) 65'; Betinho (yellow card) 81'; Rifai (yellow card) 90+1'; Paulinho (yellow card) 90+7'	Stadium: Gelora Bung Tomo; Attendance: 29,476; Referee: Rio Permana Putra

28 November 2025 14	Bhayangkara Presisi Lampung	1–1	Persebaya Surabaya	Bandar Lampung
15:30 UTC+7	Belleggia (yellow card) 14'; Damjanović (yellow card) 33'; Spasojević (yellow card) 34'; Sadat (yellow card) 54'; Dendy 90+8'	(LIB) (ILMS)	Perović (yellow card) 36'; Sadida (yellow card) 37'; Ichsas (yellow card) 79'; Savik 82' (o.g.); Bruno (yellow card) 90+8'	Stadium: Sumpah Pemuda; Attendance: 4,026; Referee: Totok Fitrianto

6 December 2025 4 (Rescheduled)	PSM Makassar	1–1	Persebaya Surabaya	Parepare
19:00 UTC+7 (20:00 UTC+8)	Sávio 8', (yellow card) 28'; Neto (yellow card) 45+1'; Akbar (yellow card) 90' (yellow-red card) 90+6'	(LIB) (LIBMS)	Bruno 12'; Perović (yellow card) 45+1'; Raičković (yellow card) 88'	Stadium: Gelora B.J. Habibie; Attendance: 6,434; Referee: Naufal Adya Fairuski

20 December 2025 15	Persebaya Surabaya	2–2	Borneo Samarinda	Surabaya
19:00 UTC+7	Freitas 24'; Toni (yellow card) 36'; Risaldi 89'; Randy (yellow card) 90+4'	(LIB) (ILMS)	Villa 22'; Lelis 71' (o.g.); Buffon (yellow card) 88'	Stadium: Gelora Bung Tomo; Attendance: 9,432; Referee: Nazmi Nasaruddin (Malaysia)
Note: Fabio Araujo Lefundes (Borneo Samarinda head coach) given a yellow card in the 36 minute.

28 December 2025 8 (Rescheduled)	Persebaya Surabaya	4–0	Persijap Jepara	Surabaya
15:30 UTC+7	Toni (yellow card) 7'; Bruno 26' (pen.); Lelis 38'; Rivera (yellow card) 50', (goal) 81'; Perović 85'; Raičković (yellow card) 89'	(LIB) (ILMS)	A. Gómez (yellow card) 25'; Sakyi (yellow card) 50'	Stadium: Gelora Bung Tomo; Attendance: 12,376; Referee: Yudi Nurcahya

3 January 2026 16	Madura United	0–1	Persebaya Surabaya	Pamekasan
19:00 UTC+7	Mendonça (yellow card) 42' (yellow-red card) 66'	(LIB) (ILMS)	Bruno (yellow card) 57', (goal) 73'; Perović (yellow card) 90+6' (yellow-red card) 90+6'	Stadium: Gelora Ratu Pamelingan; Attendance: 0 Referee: Eko Saputra
Note: Felipe Martins Goncalves (Persebaya Surabaya official) given a yellow card in the 90+2 minute.

10 January 2026 17	Persebaya Surabaya	2–1	Malut United	Surabaya
15:30 UTC+7	Freitas 14' 37'; Bruno (yellow card) 70'	(LIB) (ILMS)	Nilson (yellow card) 31'; Ciro 61'; Yan Sayuri (yellow card) 69'; Rustam (yellow card) 90+3'	Stadium: Gelora Bung Tomo; Attendance: 12,978; Referee: Naufal Adya Fairuski

==== Second round ====
25 January 2026 18	PSIM Yogyakarta	0–3	Persebaya Surabaya	Bantul
15:30 UTC+7	Reva (yellow card) 77'	(LIB) (ILMS)	Lelis (yellow card) 29'; Freitas 35'; B. Paraíba 74'; Irianto 84'	Stadium: Sultan Agung; Attendance: 7,405; Referee: Thoriq Alkatiri

1 February 2026 19	Persebaya Surabaya	1–1	Dewa United Banten	Surabaya
19:00 UTC+7	Toni (yellow card) 9'; Rivera 23'; Raičković (yellow card) 45+6'; Bruno (yellow card) 86'	(LIB) (ILMS)	Theo (yellow card) 6'; Kafiatur 30'; Kuipers (red card) 37'; Stevens (yellow card) 90+6'	Stadium: Gelora Bung Tomo; Attendance: 23,431; Referee: Nendi Rohaendi

7 February 2026 20	Bali United	1–3	Persebaya Surabaya	Gianyar
19:00 UTC+7 (20:00 UTC+8)	Arel (yellow card) 50'; J. Ferrari (yellow card) 61'; Bruijn 88'	(LIB) (ILMS)	Pedro (yellow card) 18'; Perović 26'; Suaib 69'; Mitrevski 74'	Stadium: Kapten I Wayan Dipta; Attendance: 12,163; Referee: Asep Yandis

14 February 2026 21	Persebaya Surabaya	1–2	Bhayangkara Presisi Lampung	Surabaya
19:00 UTC+7	Freitas (yellow card) 58'; Perović 64'	(LIB) (ILMS)	Doumbia 27', (yellow card) 70'; Ichsan (yellow card) 28'; Sadiki (yellow card) 30'; Sidibe 45+2'; Damjanović (yellow card) 86'; Savik (yellow card) 88'; Sani (yellow card) 89'	Stadium: Gelora Bung Tomo; Attendance: 15,425; Referee: Yudai Yamamoto (Japan)

21 February 2026 22	Persijap Jepara	3–1	Persebaya Surabaya	Jepara
20:30 UTC+7	Guarrotxena 32', 90+12'; Hidayat (yellow card) 38'; Alexis 71'; Brito (yellow card) 83'; Firman (yellow card) 90+11'	(LIB) (ILMS)	Toni (yellow card) 15'; Irianto (red card) 86'; Freitas (yellow card) 90+1'; Bruno 90+4' (pen.)	Stadium: Gelora Bumi Kartini; Attendance: 8,193; Referee: Yoko Suprianto

25 February 2026 23	Persebaya Surabaya	1–0	PSM Makassar	Surabaya
20:30 UTC+7	Rivera (yellow card) 13'; Freitas 27'; Sadida (yellow card) 53'	(LIB) (ILMS)	Sávio (yellow card) 29'; Lagator (yellow card) 36'; Arfan (yellow card) 95'	Stadium: Gelora Bung Tomo; Attendance: 7,527; Referee: Aprisman Aranda

2 March 2026 24	Persebaya Surabaya	2–2	Persib Bandung	Surabaya
20:30 UTC+7	Bruno 44' (pen.); Catur (yellow card) 63'; Rivera 83'	(LIB) (ILMS)	Barros (yellow card) 45+2'; Luciano 51', (yellow card) 75'; Jung 73', (yellow card) 85'; Adam (yellow card) 79'	Stadium: Gelora Bung Tomo; Attendance: 30,000; Referee: Eko Saputra
Note: Bojan Hodak (Persib Bandung head coach) given a yellow card in the 21 minute. Bernardo Tavares (Persebaya Surabaya head coach) given a yellow card in the 90+2 minute.

7 March 2026 25	Borneo Samarinda	5–1	Persebaya Surabaya	Samarinda
20:30 UTC+7 (21:30 UTC+8)	Villa 51', 59'; Anez (yellow card) 54'; Peralta 63'; Obieta 68'; Astina 90+2'	(LIB) (ILMS)	Sadida (yellow card) 27'; Koko (yellow card) 31'; Lelis 73'; Andhika (yellow card) 75'; Riyan (yellow card) 78'	Stadium: Segiri; Attendance: 8,881; Referee: Yudi Nurcahya

4 April 2026 26	Persebaya Surabaya	1–0	Persita Tangerang	Surabaya
19:00 UTC+7	Perović (yellow card) 55'; Rivera 61'	(LIB) (ILMS)	Ganet (yellow card) 12'; Hardianto (yellow card) 44'; Kozubayev (yellow card) 72'; Guseynov (yellow card) 90+1'	Stadium: Gelora Bung Tomo; Attendance: 12,444; Referee: Sance Lawita

11 April 2026 27	Persija Jakarta	3–0	Persebaya Surabaya	Central Jakarta
19:00 UTC+7	Allano 17', (yellow card) 57'; Maxwell (yellow card) 37'; Eksel 54', 76', (yellow card) 54'	(LIB) (ILMS)	Catur (yellow card) 34'; Jefferson (yellow card) 90+4'	Stadium: Gelora Bung Karno; Attendance: 39,443; Referee: Candra

17 April 2026 28	Persebaya Surabaya	1–2	Madura United	Surabaya
19:00 UTC+7	Freitas (yellow card) 27'; Riyan 82'	(LIB) (ILMS)	Lulinha 12'; Numberi (yellow card) 36'; Riquelme 64'; Wehrmann (yellow card) 87'; Diky (yellow card) 90+8'	Stadium: Gelora Bung Tomo; Attendance: 10,390; Referee: Yoko Suprianto

23 April 2026 29	Malut United	0–2	Persebaya Surabaya	Ternate
19:00 UTC+9 (21:00 UTC+7)	França (yellow card) 34'	(LIB) (ILMS)	Matos (yellow card) 47'; Catur (yellow card) 59'; Koko (yellow card) 64'; Toni (yellow card) 70'; Raičković 73'; Rivera 90+1'	Stadium: Gelora Kie Raha; Attendance: 2,043; Referee: Axel Febrian Sinaga

28 April 2026 30	Arema	0–4	Persebaya Surabaya	Gianyar (Note: The match was held at neutral venue.)
16:30 UTC+8 (15:30 UTC+7)	Hansamu (yellow card) 38'; Betinho (yellow card) 67'	(LIB) (ILMS)	Toni (yellow card) 40'; Rivera 49' 82'; Riyan (yellow card) 53'; Jefferson 76'; Tata 86'	Stadium: Kapten I Wayan Dipta; Attendance: 0 Referee: Thoriq Alkatiri

2 May 2026 31	Persebaya Surabaya	4–0	PSBS Biak	Surabaya
15:30 UTC+7	Catur (yellow card) 29'; Raičković 53' 66'; Rivera 75' 81'; Riyan (yellow card) 90'	(LIB) (ILMS)	Nader (yellow card) 27'; Alom (yellow card) 90+1'	Stadium: Gelora Bung Tomo; Attendance: 8,027; Referee: Muhammad Tri Santoso

9 May 2026 32	Persis Solo	0–0	Persebaya Surabaya	Surakarta
19:00 UTC+7	Zanadin (yellow card) 25'; Tumbas (yellow card) 30'	(LIB) (LIBMS)	Tata (yellow card) 90+4'	Stadium: Manahan Stadium; Attendance: 7,941; Referee: Yudi Nurcahya

15 May 2026 33	Semen Padang	0–7	Persebaya Surabaya	Padang
15:30 UTC+7	Ade (yellow card) 45+3' (yellow-red card) 61'; Asyraq (yellow card) 66'	(LIB) (ILMS)	Rivera 16'; Catur 21'; Bruno 50'; Perović 63'; Paraíba 68' (pen.) 74' 90+3'	Stadium: Gelora H. Agus Salim; Attendance: 1,516; Referee: Mustafa Kamal

23 May 2026 34	Persebaya Surabaya	5–0	Persik Kediri	Surabaya
16:00 UTC+7	Malik 13'; Gustavo (yellow card) 16' (goal) 65'; Bruno 45' 89'; Freitas (yellow card) 62'; Paraíba 80'; Koko (yellow card) 90'	(LIB) (ILMS)	Novri (yellow card) 51'; Toral (yellow card) 53'; Navacchio (yellow card) 57'; Luna (yellow card) 61'; Yandi (yellow card) 78'	Stadium: Gelora Bung Tomo; Attendance: 26,870; Referee: Gedion Dapaherang

== Statistics ==
As of 11 April 2026.

=== Appearances and goals ===
No.	Pos.	Nat.	Player	Total		Super League	
No.	Pos.	Nat.	Player	Apps	Goals	Apps	Goals
Goalkeepers
21	GK	(Indonesia) IDN	Ernando Ari	24	0	24	0
39	GK	(Indonesia) IDN	Ilham Al-Arif	0	0	0	0
52	GK	(Indonesia) IDN	Andhika Ramadhani	11	0	10+1	0
82	GK	(Indonesia) IDN	Adre Arido	0	0	0	0
Defenders
2	DF	(Indonesia) IDN	Arief Catur	32	2	30+2	2
5	DF	(North Macedonia) MKD	Risto Mitrevski	24	2	24	2
15	DF	(Indonesia) IDN	Mikael Tata	10	0	2+8	0
17	DF	(Brazil) BRA	Jefferson Silva	10	0	10	0
18	DF	(Indonesia) IDN	Randy May	6	0	0+6	0
24	DF	(Brazil) BRA	Léo Lelis	22	3	18+4	3
33	DF	(Indonesia) IDN	Koko Ari	10	0	3+7	0
44	DF	(Brazil) BRA	Gustavo Fernandes	4	0	1+3	0
66	DF	(Indonesia) IDN	Sheva Kardanu	0	0	0	0
78	DF	(Indonesia) IDN	Ilham Akbar	0	0	0	0
Midfielders
7	MF	(Mexico) MEX	Francisco Rivera	22	7	22	7
12	MF	(Indonesia) IDN	Alfan Suaib	5	1	2+3	1
16	MF	(Portugal) POR	Pedro Matos	12	0	5+7	0
26	MF	(Indonesia) IDN	Dimas Wicaksono	10	0	2+8	0
53	MF	(Indonesia) IDN	Rachmat Irianto	20	1	13+7	1
55	MF	(Indonesia) IDN	Sadida Nugraha	13	0	6+7	0
68	MF	(Indonesia) IDN	Toni Firmansyah	21	0	18+3	0
72	MF	(Indonesia) IDN	Aleandro Maulana	2	0	0+2	0
81	MF	(Indonesia) IDN	Ichsas Baihaqi	5	0	0+5	0
88	MF	(Montenegro) MNE	Miloš Raičković	26	0	26	0
Forwards
8	FW	(Indonesia) IDN	Oktafianus Fernando	1	0	0+1	0
10	FW	(Brazil) BRA	Bruno Moreira	23	10	23	10
11	FW	(Montenegro) MNE	Mihailo Perović	21	5	17+4	5
14	FW	(Indonesia) IDN	Riyan Ardiansyah	11	1	6+5	1
22	FW	(Indonesia) IDN	Gali Freitas	26	6	18+8	6
77	FW	(Indonesia) IDN	Malik Risaldi	23	1	14+9	1
83	FW	(Brazil) BRA	Bruno Paraíba	4	1	0+4	1
Loaned out during the season
9	FW	(Indonesia) IDN	Rizky Dwi Pangestu	8	0	0+8	0
23	DF	(Indonesia) IDN	Kadek Raditya	3	0	0+3	0
27	GK	(Indonesia) IDN	Rendy Oscario	0	0	0	0
Released during the season
4	DF	(North Macedonia) MKD	Dime Dimov	12	0	11+1	0
91	FW	(Serbia) SRB	Dejan Tumbas	14	0	14	0
99	FW	(Brazil) BRA	Diego Maurício	7	0	3+4	0

- Source: All matches

=== Goalscorers ===
Rank	No.	Pos.	Nat.	Player	Super League
1	10	FW	(Brazil)	Bruno Moreira	10
2	7	MF	(Mexico)	Francisco Rivera	7
3	22	FW	(Timor-Leste)	Gali Freitas	6
4	11	FW	(Montenegro)	Mihailo Perović	5
5	24	DF	(Brazil)	Léo Lelis	3
6	5	DF	(North Macedonia)	Risto Mitrevski	2
7	2	DF	(Indonesia)	Arief Catur	1
7	12	MF	(Indonesia)	Rachmat Irianto	1
7	53	MF	(Indonesia)	Rachmat Irianto	1
7	77	FW	(Indonesia)	Malik Risaldi	1
Own goal					1
Total					38

=== Top assist ===
Rank	No.	Pos.	Nat.	Player	Super League
1	7	MF	(Mexico)	Francisco Rivera	4
1	10	FW	(Brazil)	Bruno Moreira	4
1	22	FW	(Timor-Leste)	Gali Freitas	4
4	2	DF	(Indonesia)	Arief Catur	2
4	77	FW	(Indonesia)	Malik Risaldi	2
6	17	DF	(Brazil)	Jefferson Silva	1
6	68	MF	(Indonesia)	Toni Firmansyah	1
Total					18

=== Clean sheets ===
Rank	No.	Nat.	Player	Super League
1	21	(Indonesia)	Ernando Ari	7
2	52	(Indonesia)	Andhika Ramadhani	1
Total				8

=== Disciplinary record ===
No.	Pos.	Nat.	Player	Super League		
No.	Pos.	Nat.	Player	Yellow card	Second yellow card	Red card
7	MF	(Mexico)	Francisco Rivera	3	0	2
53	MF	(Indonesia)	Rachmat Irianto	2	0	1
24	DF	(Brazil)	Léo Lelis	1	0	1
91	FW	(Serbia)	Dejan Tumbas	0	0	1
11	FW	(Montenegro)	Mihailo Perović	3	1	0
15	DF	(Indonesia)	Mikael Tata	0	1	0
10	FW	(Brazil)	Bruno Moreira	7	0	0
68	MF	(Indonesia)	Toni Firmansyah	7	0	0
2	DF	(Indonesia)	Arief Catur	4	0	0
88	MF	(Montenegro)	Miloš Raičković	4	0	0
22	FW	(Timor-Leste)	Gali Freitas	3	0	0
55	MF	(Indonesia)	Sadida Nugraha	3	0	0
4	DF	(North Macedonia)	Dime Dimov	1	0	0
5	DF	(North Macedonia)	Risto Mitrevski	1	0	0
14	DF	(Indonesia)	Riyan Ardiansyah	1	0	0
16	MF	(Portugal)	Pedro Matos	1	0	0
17	DF	(Brazil)	Jefferson Silva	1	0	0
18	DF	(Indonesia)	Randy May	1	0	0
33	DF	(Indonesia)	Koko Ari	1	0	0
52	GK	(Indonesia)	Andhika Ramadhani	1	0	0
81	MF	(Indonesia)	Ichsas Baihaqi	1	0	0
Total				45	2	4
