= 2025–26 Super League (Indonesia) foreign players =

The 2025–26 Super League (Indonesia) foreign players refers to non-Indonesian footballers registered to compete in the 2025–26 season of the Super League, the top-tier professional football league in Indonesia. This article lists foreign players who are officially registered with Super League clubs for the season, in accordance with regulations set by the Football Association of Indonesia (PSSI) and I-League, as the league organizer.

== Quota rules ==
Starting from this season, I-League announced an increase in the foreign player quota to a maximum of 11 players per club. However, only 9 foreign players are allowed to be registered in the matchday squad, with a maximum of 7 in the starting eleven and 2 on the bench.

== Foreign players ==
- Players named in **bold** indicates the player was registered during the mid-season transfer window.
- Former players named in italics are players that were out of squad or left the club within the season, after the pre-season transfer window, or in the mid-season transfer window, and at least had one appearance.

Note: Flags indicate national team as has been defined under FIFA eligibility rules. Players may hold more than one non-FIFA nationality.

| Team | Players | | | | | |
|---|---|---|---|---|---|---|
| Arema | Player 1 | Player 2 | Player 3 | Player 4 | Player 5 | Player 6 |
| Arema | (Brazil) Betinho | (Brazil) Dalberto | (Brazil) **Gabriel Silva** | (Brazil) **Gustavo França** | (Brazil) **Joel Vinícius** | (Brazil) Lucas Frigeri |
| Arema | Player 7 | Player 8 | Player 9 | Player 10 | Player 11 | Former players |
| Arema | (Brazil) Matheus Blade | (Brazil) **Pablo Oliveira** | (Brazil) Valdeci | (Brazil) **Walisson Maia** | (Colombia) Julián Guevara | (Brazil) Luiz Gustavo (Brazil) Odivan Koerich (Brazil) Paulinho Moccelin (Brazil) Yann Motta (Argentina) Ian Puleio |
| Bali United | Player 1 | Player 2 | Player 3 | Player 4 | Player 5 | Player 6 |
| Bali United | (Australia) Brandon Wilson | (Brazil) João Ferrari | (Costa Rica) **Diego Campos** | (Japan) **Teppei Yachida** | (Luxembourg) Mirza Mustafić | (Montenegro) Boris Kopitović |
| Bali United | Player 7 | Player 8 | Player 9 | Player 10 | Player 11 | Former players |
| Bali United | (Netherlands) Jordy Bruijn | (Netherlands) Mike Hauptmeijer | (Netherlands) Thijmen Goppel | (Netherlands) Tim Receveur | | |
| Bhayangkara Presisi | Player 1 | Player 2 | Player 3 | Player 4 | Player 5 | Player 6 |
| Bhayangkara Presisi | (Islamic Republic of Afghanistan) Fareed Sadat | (Argentina) Lautaro Belleggia | (Brazil) **Alan Cardoso** | (Brazil) Léo Silva | (Brazil) Moisés Gaúcho | (Cameroon) **Privat Mbarga** |
| Bhayangkara Presisi | Player 7 | Player 8 | Player 9 | Player 10 | Player 11 | Former players |
| Bhayangkara Presisi | (Ivory Coast) **Bernard Doumbia** | (Japan) **Sho Yamamoto** | (Mali) **Moussa Sidibé** | (Montenegro) Slavko Damjanović | (North Macedonia) Nehar Sadiki | (Croatia) Christian Ilić (Croatia) Stjepan Plazonja (Cambodia) Andrés Nieto (Haiti) Shanyder Borgelin (Montenegro) Dejan Račić |
| Borneo Samarinda | Player 1 | Player 2 | Player 3 | Player 4 | Player 5 | Player 6 |
| Borneo Samarinda | (Argentina) **Marcos Astina** | (Argentina) Mariano Peralta | (Brazil) Caxambu | (Brazil) **Cleylton** | (Brazil) **Kaio Nunes** | (Burundi) Christophe Nduwarugira |
| Borneo Samarinda | Player 7 | Player 8 | Player 9 | Player 10 | Player 11 | Former players |
| Borneo Samarinda | (Colombia) Juan Villa | (Japan) Kei Hirose | (Lebanon) Mohamad Baker El Housseini | (Spain) **Koldo Obieta** | (Syria) **Mohammad Anez** | (Brazil) Douglas Coutinho (Brazil) Joel Vinícius (Brazil) Maicon (Colombia) Aldair Simanca |
| Dewa United Banten | Player 1 | Player 2 | Player 3 | Player 4 | Player 5 | Player 6 |
| Dewa United Banten | (Argentina) Alexis Messidoro | (Brazil) Alex Martins | (Brazil) Jajá | (Brazil) Johnathan | (Brazil) **Vico** | (Jamaica) **Damion Lowe** |
| Dewa United Banten | Player 7 | Player 8 | Player 9 | Player 10 | Player 11 | Former players |
| Dewa United Banten | (Japan) **Kodai Tanaka** | (Japan) Taisei Marukawa | (Morocco) **Noah Sadaoui** | (Netherlands) Nick Kuipers | (Netherlands) Sonny Stevens | (Brazil) Cássio Scheid (Cameroon) Privat Mbarga |
| Madura United | Player 1 | Player 2 | Player 3 | Player 4 | Player 5 | Player 6 |
| Madura United | (Bosnia and Herzegovina) Kerim Palić | (Brazil) **Emerson Souza** | (Brazil) Iran Júnior | (Brazil) **Júnior Brandão** | (Brazil) Lulinha | (Brazil) Mendonça |
| Madura United | Player 7 | Player 8 | Player 9 | Player 10 | Player 11 | Former players |
| Madura United | (Brazil) **Riquelme Sousa** | (Netherlands) Jasey Wehrmann | (Netherlands) Jordy Wehrmann | (Portugal) Pedro Monteiro | (Spain) Ruxi | (Guinea-Bissau) João Pereira (Ukraine) Valeriy Hryshyn |
| Malut United | Player 1 | Player 2 | Player 3 | Player 4 | Player 5 | Player 6 |
| Malut United | (Armenia) Wbeymar Angulo | (Brazil) Alan Bernardon | (Brazil) Ciro Alves | (Brazil) David da Silva | (Brazil) Gustavo França | (Brazil) Igor Inocêncio |
| Malut United | Player 7 | Player 8 | Player 9 | Player 10 | Player 11 | Former players |
| Malut United | (Brazil) **Lucas Cardoso** | (Brazil) Nilson Júnior | (Spain) Tyronne del Pino | | | (Brazil) Vico (Spain) Chechu Meneses |
| Persebaya | Player 1 | Player 2 | Player 3 | Player 4 | Player 5 | Player 6 |
| Persebaya | (Brazil) Bruno Moreira | (Brazil) **Bruno Paraíba** | (Brazil) **Gustavo Fernandes** | (Brazil) **Jefferson** | (Brazil) Léo Lelis | (Mexico) Francisco Rivera |
| Persebaya | Player 7 | Player 8 | Player 9 | Player 10 | Player 11 | Former players |
| Persebaya | (Montenegro) Mihailo Perović | (Montenegro) Miloš Raičković | (North Macedonia) Risto Mitrevski | (Portugal) **Pedro Matos** | (Timor-Leste) Gali Freitas | (Brazil) Diego Maurício (North Macedonia) Dime Dimov (Serbia) Dejan Tumbas |
| Persib | Player 1 | Player 2 | Player 3 | Player 4 | Player 5 | Player 6 |
| Persib | (Argentina) Luciano Guaycochea | (Argentina) Patricio Matricardi | (Brazil) Berguinho | (Brazil) Júlio César | (Brazil) Ramon Tanque | (Brazil) Uilliam Barros |
| Persib | Player 7 | Player 8 | Player 9 | Player 10 | Player 11 | Former players |
| Persib | (France) Andrew Jung | (France) **Layvin Kurzawa** | (Iraq) Frans Putros | (Italy) Federico Barba | (Spain) **Sergio Castel** | (Brazil) Wiliam Marcílio (Wales) Adam Przybek |
| Persija | Player 1 | Player 2 | Player 3 | Player 4 | Player 5 | Player 6 |
| Persija | (Brazil) Allano | (Brazil) Bruno Tubarão | (Brazil) Carlos Eduardo | (Brazil) Fábio Calonego | (Brazil) Gustavo Almeida | (Brazil) **Jean Mota** |
| Persija | Player 7 | Player 8 | Player 9 | Player 10 | Player 11 | Former players |
| Persija | (Brazil) Maxwell | (Brazil) **Paulo Ricardo** | (Brazil) Sousa | (Brazil) Thales Lira | (Morocco) **Alaaeddine Ajaraie** | (Brazil) Alan Cardoso (Brazil) Gustavo França (Japan) Ryo Matsumura |
| Persijap | Player 1 | Player 2 | Player 3 | Player 4 | Player 5 | Player 6 |
| Persijap | (Argentina) Alexis Gómez | (Brazil) França | (Brazil) **Lucas Morelatto** | (Burundi) Sudi Abdallah | (France) **Aly Ndom** | (Niger) Najeeb Yakubu |
| Persijap | Player 7 | Player 8 | Player 9 | Player 10 | Player 11 | Former players |
| Persijap | (Portugal) Diogo Brito | (Spain) **Borja Herrera** | (Spain) **Borja Martínez** | (Spain) **Iker Guarrotxena** | (Spain) **Tiri** | (Brazil) Douglas Cruz (Brazil) Rosalvo (Brazil) Rodrigo Moura (Ghana) Elvis Sakyi |
| Persik | Player 1 | Player 2 | Player 3 | Player 4 | Player 5 | Player 6 |
| Persik | (Brazil) Léo Navacchio | (Brazil) **Rodrigo Dias** | (Portugal) Kiko | (Portugal) Telmo Castanheira | (Spain) **Chechu Meneses** | (Spain) **Ernesto Gómez** |
| Persik | Player 7 | Player 8 | Player 9 | Player 10 | Player 11 | Former players |
| Persik | (Spain) Imanol García | (Spain) **Jon Toral** | (Spain) José Enrique | (Uruguay) **Adrián Luna** | | (Brazil) Lucão (France) Sylvain Atieda (Portugal) Pedro Matos (Uzbekistan) Khurshidbek Mukhtorov (Venezuela) Williams Lugo |
| Persis | Player 1 | Player 2 | Player 3 | Player 4 | Player 5 | Player 6 |
| Persis | (Brazil) **Andrei Alba** | (Brazil) **Dimitri** | (Brazil) **Jefferson Carioca** | (Croatia) **Luka Dumančić** | (Serbia) **Dušan Mijić** | (Serbia) **Miroslav Maričić** |
| Persis | Player 7 | Player 8 | Player 9 | Player 10 | Player 11 | Former players |
| Persis | (Serbia) **Vukašin Vraneš** | (Ukraine) **Roman Paparyha** | | | | (Brazil) **Clayton** (Brazil) Cleylton (Curaçao) Gervane Kastaneer (Croatia) Mateo Kocijan (Republic of Ireland) Fuad Sule (Japan) Kodai Tanaka (Japan) Sho Yamamoto (Netherlands) Jordy Tutuarima (Netherlands) Xandro Schenk (Portugal) Adriano Castanheira (Singapore) Zulfahmi Arifin |
| Persita | Player 1 | Player 2 | Player 3 | Player 4 | Player 5 | Player 6 |
| Persita | (Brazil) Éber Bessa | (Brazil) Matheus Alves | (Equatorial Guinea) Pablo Ganet | (Kyrgyzstan) Tamirlan Kozubayev | (Montenegro) Dejan Račić | (Portugal) Igor Rodrigues |
| Persita | Player 7 | Player 8 | Player 9 | Player 10 | Player 11 | Former players |
| Persita | (Serbia) Aleksa Andrejić | (South Korea) Bae Sin-yeong | (Spain) **Ramón Bueno** | (Spain) Rayco Rodríguez | (Uzbekistan) Javlon Guseynov | |
| PSBS | Player 1 | Player 2 | Player 3 | Player 4 | Player 5 | Player 6 |
| PSBS | (Angola) Kadú | (Brazil) Luquinhas | (Brazil) Pablo Andrade | (Colombia) Kevin Lopez | (Colombia) Ruyery Blanco | (Portugal) Eduardo Barbosa |
| PSBS | Player 7 | Player 8 | Player 9 | Player 10 | Player 11 | Former players |
| PSBS | (Portugal) Mohcine Nader | (Portugal) Sandro Sakho | (South Korea) Hwang Myung-hyun | | | |
| PSIM | Player 1 | Player 2 | Player 3 | Player 4 | Player 5 | Player 6 |
| PSIM | (Argentina) Ezequiel Vidal | (Argentina) Franco Ramos Mingo | (England) Deri Corfe | (Japan) Yusaku Yamadera | (Netherlands) Anton Fase | (Netherlands) Donny Warmerdam |
| PSIM | Player 7 | Player 8 | Player 9 | Player 10 | Player 11 | Former players |
| PSIM | (Netherlands) **Jop van der Avert** | (Portugal) Zé Valente | (Slovenia) Nermin Haljeta | (Tajikistan) Rakhmatsho Rakhmatzoda | | (Brazil) Rafinha |
| PSM | Player 1 | Player 2 | Player 3 | Player 4 | Player 5 | Player 6 |
| PSM | (Brazil) Alex Tanque | (Brazil) Aloísio Neto | (Brazil) Gledson Paixão | (Brazil) Sávio Roberto | (Brazil) Victor Luiz | (Cape Verde) Yuran Fernandes |
| PSM | Player 7 | Player 8 | Player 9 | Player 10 | Player 11 | Former players |
| PSM | (Republic of the Congo) Jacques Thémopelé | (Japan) Daisuke Sakai | (Montenegro) **Dušan Lagator** | (Serbia) **Luka Cumić** | (Tajikistan) **Sheriddin Boboev** | (Brazil) Lucas Dias (Liberia) Abu Kamara |
| Semen Padang | Player 1 | Player 2 | Player 3 | Player 4 | Player 5 | Player 6 |
| Semen Padang | (Brazil) Arthur | (Brazil) **Maicon** | (Canada) **Kianz Froese** | (Colombia) **Jaime Giraldo** | (Republic of the Congo) **Ravy Tsouka** | (France) **Boubakary Diarra** |
| Semen Padang | Player 7 | Player 8 | Player 9 | Player 10 | Player 11 | Former players |
| Semen Padang | (Ghana) Alhassan Wakaso | (Japan) **Kazaki Nakagawa** | (Portugal) Ângelo Meneses | (Portugal) Rui Rampa | (Spain) **Guillermo Fernández** | (Brazil) Bruno Gomes (Portugal) Filipe Chaby (Portugal) Pedro Matos (Saint Vincent and the Grenadines) Cornelius Stewart |

=== Foreign players according to confederations ===
Foreign players according to confederations
| AFC | Afghanistan (1), Australia (1), Iraq (1), Japan (8), Kyrgyzstan (1), South Korea (2), Lebanon (1), Syria (1), Tajikistan (1), Timor-Leste (1), Uzbekistan (1) |
| CAF | Angola (1), Burundi (2), Ghana (1), Equatorial Guinea (1), Cameroon (1), Congo (2), Liberia (1), Mali (1), Niger (1), Ivory Coast (1), Cape Verde (1) |
| CONCACAF | Canada (1), Costa Rica (1), Mexico (1) |
| CONMEBOL | Argentina (9), Brazil (68), Colombia (5), Uruguay (1) |
| OFC | |
| UEFA | Armenia (1), Bosnia & Herzegovina (1), England (1), France (4), Republic of Ireland (1), Italy (1), Croatia (1), Luxembourg (1), North Macedonia (1), Netherlands (11), Montenegro (3), Portugal (13), Serbia (5), Slovenia (1), Spain (15), Ukraine (1), Wales (1) |

== Naturalized/heritage players ==
The following players are footballers who are either has a mixed heritage lineage or naturalized players that are formerly holds the citizenship of their original citizenship. Therefore being considered as local players and not part of the foreign quotas.

- Player's name in **bold** indicates the player was registered after the start of the season.
- Player's name in italics indicates Overseas Indonesian players who have obtained an Indonesian passport and citizenship, therefore being considered as local players.

| Team | Player 1 | Player 2 | Player 3 | Player 4 |
|---|---|---|---|---|
| Arema | | | | |
| Bali United | (France) (Indonesia) Maouri Simon ^{2} ^{3} | (Netherlands) (Indonesia) Jens Raven^{2} ^{3} | | |
| Bhayangkara Presisi | (Montenegro) (Indonesia) Ilija Spasojević^{1} | (South Korea) (Indonesia) Ji Da-bin^{2} ^{3} | | |
| Borneo Samarinda | (Guinea) (Indonesia) Ousmane Maiket ^{2} ^{3} | (Netherlands) (Indonesia) Diego Michiels^{1} ^{2} ^{3} | | |
| Dewa United Banten | (Liberia) (Indonesia) Altalariq Ballah ^{3} | (Netherlands) (Indonesia) Rafael Struick^{1} ^{2} ^{3} | (Netherlands) (Indonesia) Stefano Lilipaly^{1} ^{2} ^{3} | (Netherlands) (Indonesia) **Ivar Jenner**^{1} ^{2} ^{3} |
| Madura United | | | | |
| Malut United | | | | |
| Persebaya | | | | |
| Persib | (Netherlands) (Indonesia) Eliano Reijnders^{1} ^{3} | (Netherlands) (Indonesia) Marc Klok^{1} ^{2} | (Netherlands) (Indonesia) Thom Haye^{1} ^{3} | (Netherlands) (Indonesia) **Dion Markx**^{2} ^{3} |
| Persija | (Spain) (Indonesia) Jordi Amat^{1} ^{3} | (Netherlands) (Indonesia) **Shayne Pattynama**^{1} ^{3} | (Netherlands) (Indonesia) **Mauro Zijlstra**^{1} ^{2} ^{3} | |
| Persijap | (Sierra Leone) (Indonesia) Prince Kallon ^{3} | | | |
| Persik | (Brazil) (Indonesia) Hugo Samir^{2} ^{3} | (Netherlands) (Indonesia) Ezra Walian^{1} ^{2} ^{3} | (United States) (Indonesia) Gavin Kwan Adsit^{1} ^{2} ^{3} | |
| Persis | (China) (Indonesia) Sutanto Tan^{2} ^{3} | | | |
| Persita | (England) (Indonesia) Jack Alan Brown^{2} ^{3} | (Japan) (Indonesia) Ryuji Utomo^{1} ^{2} ^{3} | | |
| PSBS | (England) (Indonesia) George Brown^{3} | | | |
| PSIM | | | | |
| PSM | (Canada) (Indonesia) Victor Dethan^{1} ^{2} ^{3} | | | |
| Semen Padang | (Liberia) (Indonesia) Ronaldo Kwateh^{1} ^{2} ^{3} | | | |

Notes:

^1 Capped for Indonesia national team.
^2 Capped for Indonesia national football team age groups (U-17, U-20, and U-23)
^3 Carrying Indonesia heritage.
