= Suramadu derby =

Match between two Indonesian football clubs

- Native name: Derbi Suramadu
- Other names: East Java Brotherhood derby
- Location: East Java, Indonesia
- Teams: Persebaya Surabaya; Madura United
- First meeting: 28 January 2018; Indonesia President's Cup; Persebaya 1–0 Madura United
- Latest meeting: 20 April 2025; Liga 1 Persebaya 1–0 Madura United
- Next meeting: 31 January 2026; Super League; Madura United vs Persebaya
- Stadiums: Gelora Bung Tomo Stadium (Persebaya); Gelora Ratu Pamelingan Stadium (Madura United)

Statistics
- Total meetings: 20
- Top scorer: Beto Gonçalves (8 goals)
- All-time series: Persebaya: 12; Draw: 6 Madura United: 3
- Largest victory: 25 October 2018; Liga 1 Persebaya 4–0 Madura United
- Largest goal scoring: 14 February 2020; East Java Governor Cup; Madura United 2–4 Persebaya (6 goals)
- Longest win streak: 5 matches Persebaya (2019–2022)
- Longest unbeaten streak: 8 matches Persebaya (2019–2023)

Suramadu derby or East Java Brotherhood derby is the name given in football rivalries to any match between two Indonesian football clubs Persebaya Surabaya and Madura United in Super League, the name of this derby is taken from the Suramadu Bridge which is the dividing bridge between the two teams. The fierce competition between both teams began in 2018 when Persebaya Surabaya and Madura United were grouped together in the 2018 Indonesia President's Cup.

== History ==
Suramadu derby had already emerged before the match was held. In mid-April 2017, it was reported that both teams would play a trial match, but it was canceled. The poster was spread on social media with the words "Suramadu derby" as the title. The public of Surabaya and Madura were excited, so this term was attached.

This term could be a breakthrough for clubs who want to describe a fierce duel with other clubs. A special term must be given to make it easier for the public to carelessly call the meeting of all East Java clubs the East Java derby. It is also called the "East Java Brotherhood derby", because the two clubs and their supporters are not involved in clashes and their relationship is friendly.

The first meeting between the two teams took place on 28 January 2018 at the Indonesia President's Cup pre-season tournament.

== Statistics ==
As of 24 April 2025

Competition	Played	PBY	Draw	MDR	PBY goals	MDR goals
Super League (Indonesia)	12	7	4	1	21	13
Piala Indonesia	2	0	1	1	2	3
Indonesia President's Cup	3	3	0	0	5	2
Friendly match/Menpora Cup/East Java Governor Cup/East Kalimantan Governor Cup	3	2	1	0	7	4
Total	20	12	6	2	35	22

=== Top goalscorers ===
Bold denote players still currently at either Persebaya or Madura United.

As of 24 April 2025

Player	Club	Super League	Piala Indonesia	Indonesia President's Cup	Friendly match/Menpora Cup/Governor Cup	Total
(Indonesia) Beto Gonçalves	Madura United	4	2	1	1	8
(Indonesia) Osvaldo Haay	Persebaya	3	1	0	0	4
(Brazil) David da Silva	Persebaya	3	0	0	1	4
(Indonesia) Irfan Jaya	Persebaya	3	0	0	0	3
(Brazil) Aleksandar Rakić	Madura United	1	1	1	0	3
(Palestine) **Mohammed Rashid**	Persebaya	2	0	0	0	2
(Brazil) **Lulinha**	Madura United	2	0	0	0	2
(Brazil) Otávio Dutra	Persebaya	1	0	1	0	2
(Guinea-Bissau) Amido Baldé	Persebaya	1	0	1	0	2
(Mali) Makan Konaté	Persebaya	0	0	0	2	2

== Results ==
=== All match results ===
The record counts all competitions (league, official tournament and pre-season tournament).

Competition	Date	Home team	Result	Away team	Venue	City/Regency
2018 Indonesia President's Cup	28 January 2018	Persebaya	1–0	Madura United	Gelora Bung Tomo Stadium	Surabaya
2018 East Kalimantan Governor Cup	24 February 2018	Madura United	1–1 (4–5 pen.)	Persebaya	Batakan Stadium	Balikpapan
2018 Liga 1	25 May 2018	Madura United	2–2	Persebaya	Gelora Ratu Pamelingan Stadium	Pamekasan
2018 Liga 1	25 October 2018	Persebaya	4–0	Madura United	Gelora Bung Tomo Stadium	Surabaya
2019 Indonesia President's Cup	3 April 2019	Persebaya	1–0	Madura United	Gelora Bung Tomo Stadium	Surabaya
2019 Indonesia President's Cup	3 April 2019	Madura United	2–3	Persebaya	Gelora Ratu Pamelingan Stadium	Pamekasan
2018–19 Piala Indonesia	19 June 2019	Persebaya	1–1	Madura United	Gelora Bung Tomo Stadium	Surabaya
2018–19 Piala Indonesia	27 June 2019	Madura United	2–1	Persebaya	Gelora Ratu Pamelingan Stadium	Pamekasan
2019 Liga 1	10 August 2019	Persebaya	2–2	Madura United	Gelora Bung Tomo Stadium	Surabaya
2019 Liga 1	2 December 2019	Madura United	2–3	Persebaya	Gelora Bangkalan Stadium	Bangkalan
2020 East Java Governor Cup	14 February 2020	Madura United	2–4	Persebaya	Gelora Bangkalan Stadium	Bangkalan
2021 Menpora Cup	28 March 2021	Madura United	1–2	Persebaya	Si Jalak Harupat Stadium	Bandung
2021–22 Liga 1	20 November 2021	Persebaya	1–0	Madura United	Maguwoharjo Stadium	Sleman
2021–22 Liga 1	28 February 2022	Madura United	1–2	Persebaya	Ngurah Rai Stadium	Denpasar
2022–23 Liga 1	14 August 2022	Persebaya	2–2	Madura United	Gelora Bung Tomo Stadium	Surabaya
2022–23 Liga 1	29 January 2023	Madura United	0–2	Persebaya	Gelora Ratu Pamelingan Stadium	Pamekasan
2023–24 Liga 1	17 September 2023	Madura United	3–0	Persebaya	Gelora Bangkalan Stadium	Bangkalan
2023–24 Liga 1	13 March 2024	Persebaya	0–0	Madura United	Gelora Bung Tomo Stadium	Surabaya
2024–25 Liga 1	2 December 2024	Madura United	1–2	Persebaya	Gelora Bangkalan Stadium	Bangkalan
2024–25 Liga 1	20 April 2025	Persebaya	1–0	Madura United	Gelora Bung Tomo Stadium	Surabaya
2025–26 Super League	3 January 2026	Madura United	0–1	Persebaya	Gelora Ratu Pamelingan Stadium	Pamekasan
2025–26 Super League	17 April 2026	Persebaya	1–2	Madura United	Gelora Bung Tomo Stadium	Surabaya
2026–27 Super League	26 October 2026	Persebaya	3–1	Madura United	Gelora Bung Tomo Stadium	Surabaya
2026–27 Super League	21 February 2027	Madura United		Persebaya	Gelora Ratu Pamelingan Stadium	Pamekasan

== Players in both teams ==
Note:

- Players in **bold** are still active

=== Moving from Persebaya to Madura United ===
Player	Persebaya	Madura United
(Indonesia) **Koko Ari Araya**	2019–2023	2023–
(Indonesia) Miswar Saputra	2017–2019	2022–2023, 2025–2026
(Indonesia) Muhammad Kemaluddin	2020–2021	2024–2026
(Indonesia) Frank Sokoy	2021–2022	2024
(Indonesia) Slamet Nurcahyono	2004–2006	2016–2024
(Indonesia) Satria Tama	2021–2023	2023–2024
(Indonesia) Rivaldi Bawuo	2021	2020–2021, 2022–2023
(Indonesia) Andik Rendika Rama	2009–2012 (U21 team)	2023–2024
(Indonesia) Novan Sasongko	2019	2021–2024
(Indonesia) Reva Adi Utama	2021–2022, 2023–2024	2022–2023
(Indonesia) Fandry Imbiri	2017–2018	2019–2021, 2022
(Indonesia) Nelson Alom	2018–2020	2020–2021
(Indonesia) Misbakus Solikin	2017–2019	2020
(Indonesia) Andik Vermansah	2008–2013	2019
(Indonesia) Lucky Wahyu	2007–2012	2018
(Indonesia) Guy Junior Ondoua	2008	2016–2017

=== Moving from Madura United to Persebaya ===
Player	Madura United	Persebaya
(Mexico) **Francisco Rivera**	2023–2024	2024–
(Indonesia) **Malik Risaldi**	2022–2024	2024–
(Indonesia) **Kadek Raditya**	2019–2023	2023–
(Indonesia) Angga Saputro	2016–2018	2020–2021
(Indonesia) Fandi Eko Utomo	2017	2018–2019
(Indonesia) Raphael Maitimo	2018–2019	2018
(Indonesia) O.K. John	2018–2019	2018
(Indonesia) Rishadi Fauzi	2016–2017	2017–2018

== Honours ==
Persebaya	Competition	Madura United
Domestic
6	League competitions (1st tier)	-
3	Liga Indonesia First Division/Liga 2 (Indonesia) (2nd tier)	-
-	Piala Indonesia	-
1	Piala Presiden	-
-	Menpora Cup	-
-	Piala Utama/Indonesian Community Shield (defunct)	-
10	Aggregate	0

== See also ==
- List of association football club rivalries in Indonesia
