= Gustavo Fernandes (Brazilian footballer) =

Brazilian professional footballer (born 1999)

Personal information
- Full name: Gustavo Fernandes Henrique Querino
- Date of birth: 5 July 1999 (age 27)
- Place of birth: Osasco, Brazil
- Height: 1.95 m (6 ft 5 in)
- Position: Centre-back

Team information
- Current team: Paredes

Youth career
- 2017: Grêmio
- 2018–2020: Santos
- 2021: Inter Bebedouro

Senior career*
| Years | Team | Apps | (Gls) |
| 2022 | Anadia | 3 | (0) |
| 2022–2023 | Valadares Gaia | 19 | (2) |
| 2023–2024 | Sanjoanense | 26 | (3) |
| 2024–2025 | Penafiel | 26 | (0) |
| 2026 | Persebaya Surabaya | 11 | (1) |
| 2026– | Paredes | 0 | (0) |
- * Club domestic league appearances and goals as of 23 May 2026

Gustavo Fernandes Henrique Querino (born 5 July 1999) commonly known as Gustavo Fernandes, is a Brazilian professional footballer who plays as a centre-back for Liga 3 club Paredes.

== Club career ==
Born in Osasco, Brazil, Gustavo represented Grêmio, Santos and Inter Bebedouro as a youth, and he moved abroad for the first time in his career, after agreeing to a year contract with Liga 3 Portugal club Anadia. He made his club debut on 6 February 2022, in a 1–2 away win over Montalegre.

In July 2023, Gustavo was signed another Liga 3 club Sanjoanense. Previously, he plays for Valadares Gaia. He made his league debut for the club on 9 August 2023, playing as a starter in the 1–0 away loss to Trofense. On 29 October 2023, he captained his team for the first time and playing the full 90 minute in a 1–1 draw against Lusitânia. On 3 December 2023, he scored his first league goal against his former club Anadia in a 2–1 home win. He has played 28 matches in all competitions and provided 3 assists and 3 goals for Sanjoanense.

In July 2024, Gustavo signed a contract with Liga Portugal 2 club Penafiel. He made 29 appearances for Penafiel, with one assist, collecting three yellow cards. In total, he played 1,736 minutes, showing that he was a regular player in the team.

On 10 January 2026, he went to Indonesia and joined the Super League club Persebaya Surabaya. He was introduced at the Gelora Bung Tomo Stadium alongside other foreign recruits from the same country, Bruno Paraíba and Jefferson.
