= Rendy Oscario =

Indonesian footballer (born 1998)

Personal information
- Full name: Rendy Oscario Sroyer
- Date of birth: 7 October 1998 (age 28)
- Place of birth: Jakarta, Indonesia
- Height: 1.78 m (5 ft 10 in)
- Position: Goalkeeper

Team information
- Current team: Persipura Jayapura
- Number: 27

Senior career*
Years	Team	Apps	(Gls)
2016–2021	Semen Padang	49	(0)
2022	Persita Tangerang	10	(0)
2022–2023	Madura United	19	(0)
2023–2025	Persita Tangerang	9	(0)
2025–2026	Persebaya Surabaya	0	(0)
2026	→ Semen Padang (loan)	13	(0)
2026–	Persipura Jayapura	3	(0)
- * Club domestic league appearances and goals as of 2 October 2026

Rendy Oscario Sroyer (born 7 October 1998) is an Indonesian professional footballer who plays as a goalkeeper.

== Club career ==
=== Semen Padang ===
He was signed for Semen Padang to play in Indonesia Soccer Championship in 2016.

=== Persita Tangerang ===
In 2022, Oscario signed a contract with Indonesian Liga 1 club Persita Tangerang. He made his league debut on 7 January 2022 in a match against Persib Bandung at the Ngurah Rai Stadium, Denpasar.

=== Madura United ===
Oscario was signed for Madura United to play in Liga 1 in the 2022–23 season. He made his league debut on 23 July 2022 in a match against Barito Putera at the Gelora Ratu Pamelingan Stadium, Pamekasan.

=== Return to Persita Tangerang ===
Ahead of the 2023–24 season, Oscario signed a one-year contract with Persita Tangerang.

== Honours ==
Semen Padang

- Liga 2 runner-up: 2018
