= Pedro Matos (footballer, born 1998) =

Portuguese professional footballer (born 1998)

Personal information
- Full name: Pedro Ricardo Rodrigues de Matos
- Date of birth: 11 May 1998 (age 28)
- Place of birth: Vila Nova de Gaia, Portugal
- Height: 1.75 m (5 ft 9 in)
- Position: Attacking midfielder

Youth career
- 2010–2011: Salgueiros
- 2012–2015: Gondomar
- 2016: Sousense

Senior career*
Years	Team	Apps	(Gls)
2017–2021	Sousense	84	(3)
2021–2023	Praiense	45	(1)
2023–2024	Valadares Gaia	17	(4)
2024–2025	Sanjoanense	18	(2)
2025–2026	Semen Padang	15	(1)
2026	→ Persebaya Surabaya (loan)	12	(0)
- * Club domestic league appearances and goals as of 23 April 2026

Pedro Ricardo Rodrigues de Matos (born 11 May 1998) is a Portuguese professional footballer who plays as an attacking midfielder.

== Club career ==
Born in Vila Nova de Gaia, Portugal, Matos began his professional career in Sousense. After four seasons with Sousense, he played for Praiense and Valadares Gaia.

In June 2024, he signed a contract with Sanjoanense for 2024–25 season. He made his club debut on 9 November 2024, in the 1–0 home win against Vilaverdense. On 9 March 2025, he scored his first league goal for Sanjoanense against Braga B, opening the scoring in a 1–1 draw. He added his second goals of the season on 26 April 2025 with one goal against Trofense in a 3–1 home win. During his time with Sanjoanense, he established himself as a attacking midfielder, making 18 appearances and contributing 2 goals and 4 assists in all competitions.

=== Semen Padang ===
In July 2025, Matos moved abroad for the first time to Indonesia in his career, after agreeing to a year contract with the newly promoted side Semen Padang for the 2025–26 season. He made his league debut as a starter on 15 August 2025, in the 2–0 home win against Dewa United. On 20 November, he scored his first league goal for Kabau Sirah in a 1–2 away win over Persijap Jepara at Gelora Bumi Kartini Stadium. During the first half of the season, he made 15 appearances, scoring one goal and providing four assists, totaling 1,144 minutes of play.

==== Loan to Persebaya Surabaya ====
On 22 January 2026, Matos joined Persebaya Surabaya, on a loan deal from Semen Padang. He made his club debut three days later, replacing Miloš Raičković, in a 0–3 away win against PSIM Yogyakarta at Sultan Agung Stadium.
