= Risky Dwiyan =

Indonesian footballer (born 1999)

Personal information
- Full name: Risky Dwiyan Apriliyanto
- Date of birth: 1 April 1999 (age 27)
- Place of birth: Kediri, Indonesia
- Height: 1.70 m (5 ft 7 in)
- Position: Midfielder

Youth career
- ASSBI Jatim
- 2017–2019: Persebaya Surabaya

Senior career*
Years	Team	Apps	(Gls)
2019	Semeru	7	(0)
2021	Persikab Bandung	13	(1)
2022–2024	Persebaya Surabaya	23	(0)
2023–2024	→ Persiba Balikpapan (loan)	6	(0)
2024–2025	Persikab Bandung	13	(0)
2025–2026	Persiba Bantul	16	(1)
- * Club domestic league appearances and goals as of 7 February 2026

Risky Dwiyan Apriliyanto (born 1 April 1999) is an Indonesian professional footballer who plays as a midfielder.

== Club career ==
=== Persikab Bandung ===
On 2021, Risky Dwiyan signed a one-year contract with Liga 3 club Persikab Bandung. He made 13 league appearances and scored one goal for Persikab Bandung in the 2021 Liga 3 (Indonesia).

=== Persebaya Surabaya ===
Dwiyan was signed for Persebaya Surabaya and played in Liga 1 in the 2022–23 season. He made his league debut on 25 July 2022 in a match against Persita Tangerang at the Gelora Bung Tomo Stadium, Surabaya.

== Career statistics ==
=== Club ===
As of 9 January 2026

Appearances and goals by club, season and competition
Club	Season	League			Cup		Continental		Other		Total	
Club	Season	Division	Apps	Goals	Apps	Goals	Apps	Goals	Apps	Goals	Apps	Goals
Semeru	2019	Liga 3	7	0	0	0	–		0	0	7	0
Persikab Bandung	2021	Liga 3	13	1	0	0	–		0	0	13	1
Persebaya Surabaya	2022–23	Liga 1	22	0	0	0	–		1 (Note: Appearances in Indonesia President's Cup)	0	23	0
Persebaya Surabaya	2023–24	Liga 1	1	0	0	0	–		0	0	1	0
Persebaya Surabaya	2024–25	Liga 1	0	0	0	0	–		0	0	0	0
Persiba Balikpapan (loan)	2023–24	Liga 2	6	0	0	0	–		0	0	6	0
Persikab Bandung	2024–25	Liga Nusantara	13	0	0	0	–		0	0	13	0
Persiba Bantul	2025–26	Liga Nusantara	9	0	0	0	–		0	0	9	0
Career total			71	1	0	0	0	0	1	0	72	1

== Honours ==
Persebaya Surabaya U20

- Elite Pro Academy U-20: 2019

Persikab Bandung

- Liga 3 West Java: 2021
