= Reva Adi Utama =

Indonesian footballer

Personal information
- Full name: Reva Adi Utama
- Date of birth: 1 September 1996 (age 30)
- Place of birth: Makassar, Indonesia
- Height: 1.72 m (5 ft 8 in)
- Position: Left-back

Team information
- Current team: Borneo Samarinda (on loan from PSIM Yogyakarta)

Youth career
- 2011–2015: Frenz United

Senior career*
Years	Team	Apps	(Gls)
2016–2019	PSM Makassar	54	(1)
2019	Badak Lampung	14	(0)
2020–2021	Barito Putera	3	(0)
2021–2022	Persebaya Surabaya	25	(0)
2022–2023	Madura United	29	(0)
2023–2024	Persebaya Surabaya	28	(0)
2024–2025	Dewa United	24	(0)
2025–	PSIM Yogyakarta	19	(0)
2026–	→ Borneo Samarinda (loan)	0	(0)

International career
2013	Indonesia U19	3	(0)
- * Club domestic league appearances and goals as of 17 May 2026

Reva Adi Utama (born 1 September 1996) is an Indonesian professional footballer who plays as a left-back for Super League club Borneo Samarinda, on loan from PSIM Yogyakarta.

== Club career ==
=== Badak Lampung ===
In 2019, Reva Adi signed a contract with Indonesian Liga 1 club Badak Lampung. He made his debut on 1 September 2019 in a match against Persija Jakarta at the Patriot Candrabaga Stadium, Bekasi.

=== PS Barito Putera ===
He was signed for Barito Putera to play in the Liga 1 in the 2020 season. This season was suspended on 27 March 2020 due to the COVID-19 pandemic. The season was abandoned and was declared void on 20 January 2021.

=== Persebaya Surabaya ===
In 2021, Reva Adi signed a contract with Indonesian Liga 1 club Persebaya Surabaya. He made his debut on 24 September 2021 in a match against Bhayangkara at the Si Jalak Harupat Stadium, Soreang.

=== Madura United ===
Reva was signed for Madura United to play in Liga 1 in the 2022–23 season. He made his league debut on 23 July 2022 in a match against Barito Putera at the Gelora Ratu Pamelingan Stadium, Pamekasan.

== Career statistics ==
=== Club ===
As of match played 17 May 2026

Club	Season	League			Cup (Note: Includes Piala Indonesia)		Continental		Other (Note: Appearances in Indonesia President's Cup)		Total	
Club	Season	Division	Apps	Goals	Apps	Goals	Apps	Goals	Apps	Goals	Apps	Goals
PSM Makassar	2016	ISC A	9	0	0	0	–		0	0	9	0
PSM Makassar	2017	Liga 1	24	0	0	0	–		2	0	26	0
PSM Makassar	2018	Liga 1	21	1	0	0	–		2	0	23	1
PSM Makassar	2019	Liga 1	0	0	0	0	2 (Note: Appearances in AFC Cup)	0	2	0	4	0
PSM Makassar	Total		54	1	0	0	2	0	6	0	62	1
Badak Lampung	2019	Liga 1	14	0	0	0	–		0	0	14	0
Barito Putera	2020	Liga 1	1	0	0	0	–		0	0	1	0
Persebaya Surabaya	2021–22	Liga 1	25	0	0	0	–		1 (Note: Appearances in Menpora Cup)	0	26	0
Madura United	2022–23	Liga 1	29	0	0	0	–		4	0	33	0
Persebaya Surabaya	2023–24	Liga 1	28	0	0	0	—		0	0	28	0
Dewa United	2024–25	Liga 1	24	0	0	0	—		0	0	24	0
PSIM Yogyakarta	2025–26	Super League	19	0	0	0	–		0	0	19	0
Career total			196	1	0	0	2	0	11	0	209	1
