= Randy May =

Indonesian footballer (born 2000)

Personal information
- Full name: Randy Hanson Christian May
- Date of birth: 21 September 2000 (age 26)
- Place of birth: Sentani, Indonesia
- Height: 1.80 m (5 ft 11 in)
- Position: Full-back

Team information
- Current team: Persebaya Surabaya
- Number: 18

Youth career
- 2019-2021: PON Papua

Senior career*
Years	Team	Apps	(Gls)
2021	Persimer Merauke		
2022	Toli		
2022	Dewa United	0	(0)
2022	→ Karo United (loan)	4	(0)
2023–2024	Persiba Balikpapan	11	(0)
2024–	Persebaya Surabaya	14	(0)
- * Club domestic league appearances and goals as of 10 January 2026

Randy May (born 21 September 2000) is an Indonesian professional footballer who plays as a full-back for Super League club Persebaya Surabaya.

== Club career ==
=== Dewa United ===
May was announced as Dewa United's new recruit on 12 June 2022. Previously, May played for Pekan Olahraga Nasional.

=== Karo United (loan) ===
Dewa United announced that May had signed a loan deal with the Liga 2 club Karo United.

=== Persiba Balikpapan ===
Persiba Balikpapan announced that it had brought in May.

=== Persebaya Surabaya ===
May joined Persebaya Surabaya to compete in the 2024–25 Liga 1 season.

== Honours ==
Persebaya Surabaya

- Piala Presiden: 2026
