= Rizky Dwi Pangestu =

Indonesian footballer

Personal information
- Full name: Rizky Dwi Pangestu
- Date of birth: 9 April 1999 (age 27)
- Place of birth: Banyuwangi, Indonesia
- Height: 1.84 m (6 ft 0 in)
- Position: Striker

Team information
- Current team: Kendal Tornado
- Number: 12

Youth career
- –2017: Persip Pesanggaran
- 2018: Persikoba Batu
- 2021: PON East Java

Senior career*
Years	Team	Apps	(Gls)
2019–2020	Semeru	14	(8)
2021–2022	Serpong City	18	(18)
2022	Sulut United	4	(1)
2023–2024	PSIS Semarang	11	(2)
2023–2024	→ Bekasi City (loan)	6	(0)
2024–2026	Persebaya Surabaya	22	(1)
2026	→ Garudayaksa (loan)	3	(0)
2026–	Kendal Tornado	1	(0)
- * Club domestic league appearances and goals as of 26 September 2026

Rizky Dwi Pangestu (born 9 April 1999) is an Indonesian professional footballer who plays as a striker for Championship club Kendal Tornado.

== Early life ==
He was born in Banyuwangi, East Java.

== Club career ==
=== Youth ===
He played for PON Jatim in 2021.

=== Semeru F.C. ===
In 2019, he signed for Semeru.

=== Serpong City F.C. ===
In 2021, he signed for Serpong City. He contributed with Serpong City in the 2021–22 Liga 3 with 18 appearances, and scored 18 goals.

=== Sulut United F.C. ===
In 2022, he signed for Sulut United.

=== PSIS Semarang ===
He was signed for PSIS Semarang to play in second round of 2022-23 Liga 1. Rizky made his professional debut on 31 January 2023 in a match against Persib Bandung at the Jatidiri Stadium, Semarang.

== Career statistics ==
=== Club ===
As of 26 September 2026

Club	Season	League			Cup		Continental		Other		Total	
Club	Season	Division	Apps	Goals	Apps	Goals	Apps	Goals	Apps	Goals	Apps	Goals
Semeru	2019	Liga 3	14	8	0	0	–		0	0	14	8
Serpong City	2021–22	Liga 3	18	18	0	0	–		0	0	18	18
Sulut United	2022–23	Liga 2	4	1	0	0	–		0	0	4	1
PSIS Semarang	2022–23	Liga 1	7	2	0	0	–		0	0	7	2
PSIS Semarang	2023–24	Liga 1	4	0	0	0	–		0	0	4	0
Bekasi City (loan)	2023–24	Liga 2	6	0	0	0	–		0	0	6	0
Persebaya Surabaya	2024–25	Liga 1	14	1	0	0	–		0	0	14	1
Persebaya Surabaya	2025–26	Super League	8	0	0	0	–		0	0	8	0
Garudayaksa	2025–26	Championship	3	0	0	0	–		0	0	3	0
Kendal Tornado	2026–27	Championship	1	0	0	0	–		0	0	1	0
Career total			79	30	0	0	0	0	0	0	79	30

== Honours ==
Garudayaksa

- Championship: 2025–26
