= Dime Dimov =

Macedonian footballer

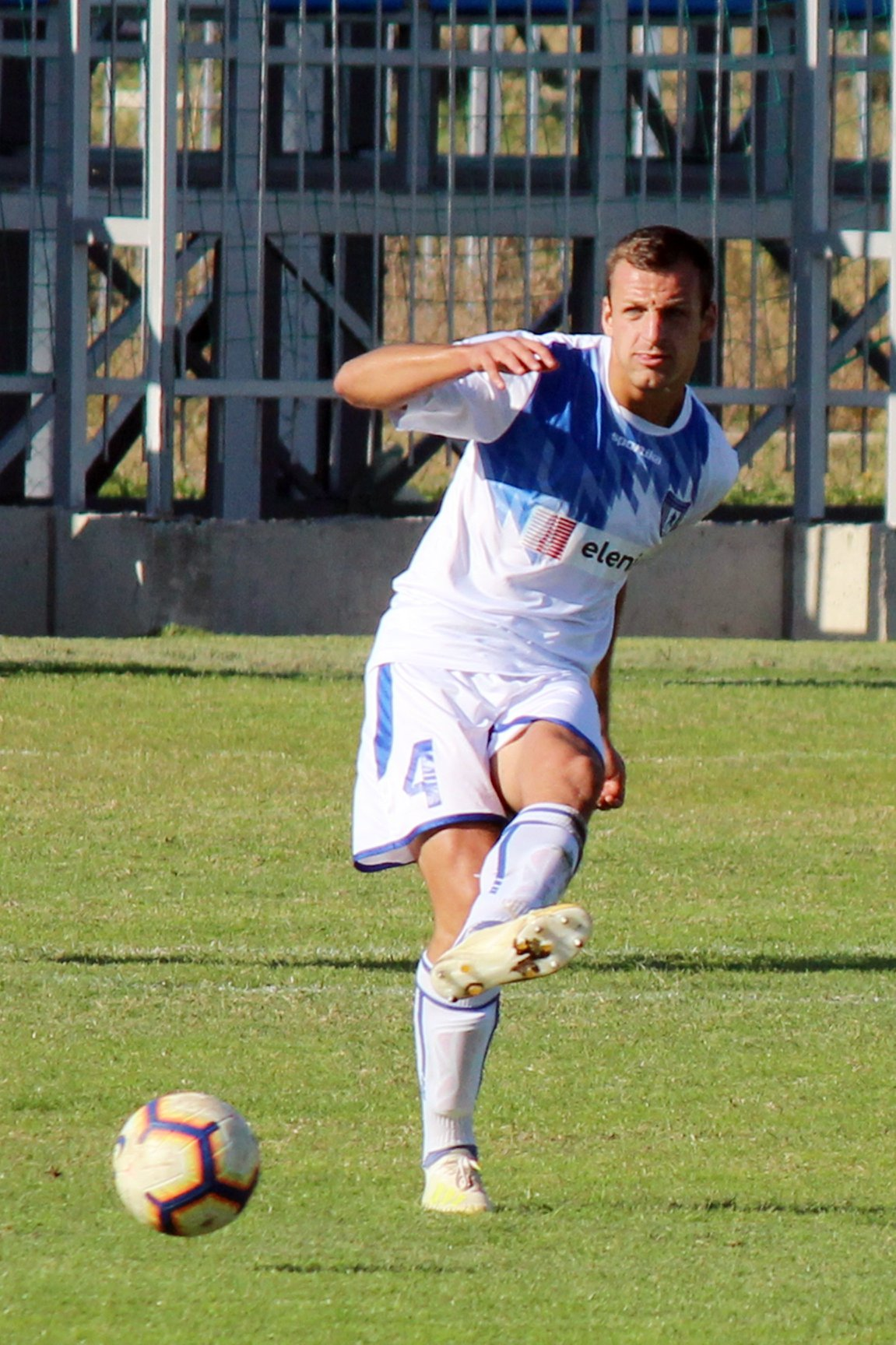
- Dino playing for Gostivari in 2015

Personal information
- Full name: Dime Dimov
- Date of birth: 25 July 1994 (age 32)
- Place of birth: Skopje, North Macedonia
- Height: 1.84 m (6 ft 0 in)
- Position: Centre-back

Team information
- Current team: Bylis
- Number: 19

Senior career*
Years	Team	Apps	(Gls)
2013	Metalurg Skopje	15	(0)
2014	Kozuf Miravci	21	(0)
2015	Gostivari	18	(0)
2016	Horizont Turnovo	15	(0)
2016–2023	Brera Strumica	141	(2)
2023–2024	Lokomotiv Sofia	53	(0)
2025	Persebaya Surabaya	29	(0)
2026–	Bylis	13	(0)
- * Club domestic league appearances and goals as of 13 May 2026

Dime Dimov (Macedonian: Диме Димов, born 25 July 1994) is a Macedonian professional footballer who plays as a centre-back for Albanian club Bylis.

== Club career ==
Born in Skopje, he played for numerous clubs in the Macedonian First League between 2013 until 2023. Ahead of the 2023–24 season, he signed with Bulgarian First League club Lokomotiv Sofia. He made his debut in the 2023–24 season on 17 July 2023, in a 1–0 win against Botev Vratsa. In his two seasons with Lokomotiv Sofia, Dimov not only played as a centre-back, but was also able to adapt as a midfielder. His position is quite flexible, adjusting to the needs of the coach. He contributed with a total of 4,404 minutes.

=== Persebaya Surabaya ===
On 5 January 2025, Dimov move to Asia and signed a contract for Indonesian Liga 1 club Persebaya Surabaya. Dimov's presence adds to the strength of Persebaya's back line. He will play alongside Slavko Damjanović. On 11 January 2025, Dimov made his league debut for the club in a 3–1 lose over PSS Sleman, coming on as a substitute for Kadek Raditya in the 79th minute. On 15 February 2025, he picked up his first win with Persebaya in his sixth appearances in a 1–0 home win over PSBS Biak. On 15 June 2025, Dimov extended his contract with the club until May 2026.

== Honours ==
AP Brera Strumica

- Macedonian Football Cup: 2018–19
