= Khabib Syukron =

Indonesian footballer

Personal information
- Full name: Khabib Syukron
- Date of birth: 15 February 1988 (age 38)
- Place of birth: Jakarta, Indonesia
- Height: 1.70 m (5 ft 7 in)
- Positions: Defender; midfielder

Senior career*
Years	Team	Apps	(Gls)
2011–2012	Bhayangkara F.C.		
2012–2015	Gresik United	26	(0)
2016–2017	PSBI Blitar	18	(0)
2017–2019	Persibo Bojonegoro	27	(0)
- * Club domestic league appearances and goals as of 11 September 2013

Khabib Syukron (born on February 15, 1988) is an Indonesian former footballer.
