= Andhika Ramadhani =

Indonesian footballer (born 1999)

Personal information
- Full name: Andhika Ramadhani
- Date of birth: 5 January 1999 (age 27)
- Place of birth: Surabaya, Indonesia
- Height: 1.85 m (6 ft 1 in)
- Position: Goalkeeper

Team information
- Current team: Persik Kediri
- Number: 52

Youth career
- 2017–2020: Persebaya Surabaya

Senior career*
Years	Team	Apps	(Gls)
2021–2026	Persebaya Surabaya	69	(0)
2026–	Persik Kediri	1	(0)
- * Club domestic league appearances and goals as of 18 September 2026

Andhika Ramadhani (born 5 January 1999) is an Indonesian professional footballer who plays as a goalkeeper for Super League club Persik Kediri.

== Club career ==
=== Persebaya Surabaya ===
He was signed for Persebaya Surabaya to play in Liga 1 in the 2021 season. Andhika made his professional debut on 3 October 2021 in a match against PSIS Semarang at the Wibawa Mukti Stadium, Cikarang.

== Honours ==
=== Club ===
Persebaya Surabaya U-20

- Elite Pro Academy U-20: 2019
