= Riyan Ardiansyah =

Indonesian footballer

Personal information
- Full name: Riyan Ardiansyah
- Date of birth: 14 May 1996 (age 30)
- Place of birth: Pati, Indonesia
- Height: 1.74 m (5 ft 9 in)
- Position: Winger

Team information
- Current team: Java United
- Number: 14

Youth career
- 2011–2013: PPLP Jateng
- 2013–2014: Persab Brebes
- 2015–2016: Persipa Pati

Senior career*
Years	Team	Apps	(Gls)
2017	PS Bengkulu	14	(0)
2018	Persiwa Wamena	13	(1)
2019–2025	PSIS Semarang	115	(11)
2025–	Java United	8	(0)
2025–2026	→ Persebaya Surabaya (loan)	11	(1)
- * Club domestic league appearances and goals as of 19 September 2026

Riyan Ardiansyah (born 14 May 1996) is an Indonesian professional footballer who plays as a winger for Super League club Java United.

== Club career ==
=== PS Bengkulu ===
He was signed for PS Bengkulu to play in Liga 2 in the 2017 season.

=== Persiwa Wamena ===
In 2018, Riyan Ardiansyah signed a one-year contract with Indonesian Liga 2 club Persiwa Wamena.

=== PSIS Semarang ===
In 2019, Riyan Ardiansyah signed a one-year contract with Indonesian Liga 1 club PSIS Semarang. Riyan made his debut on 10 July 2019 in a match against Borneo. On 4 September 2021, Riyan scored his first goal for PSIS against Persela Lamongan at the Wibawa Mukti Stadium, Bekasi. On 9 September 2022, Riyan scored hattrick in a 3–2 home win against Persikabo 1973 at Jatidiri Stadium, this is the first hat-trick in his career as a footballer and also first hat-trick local players in this league season. On 13 December, he scored the opening goal in a 2–0 win over Persija Jakarta.

On 21 January 2023, Riyan scored the only goal in PSIS's 1–0 victory over Arema. On 9 June 2025, Riyan Ardiansyah officially left PSIS Semarang.

== Career statistics ==
=== Club ===
As of 19 September 2026

Club	Season	League			Cup		Continental		Other		Total	
Club	Season	Division	Apps	Goals	Apps	Goals	Apps	Goals	Apps	Goals	Apps	Goals
PS Bengkulu	2017	Liga 2	14	0	0	0	–		0	0	14	0
Persiwa Wamena	2018	Liga 2	13	1	0	0	–		0	0	13	1
Persiwa Wamena	Total		27	1	0	0	–		0	0	27	1
PSIS Semarang	2019	Liga 1	3	0	0	0	–		0	0	3	0
PSIS Semarang	2020	Liga 1	0	0	0	0	–		0	0	0	0
PSIS Semarang	2021–22	Liga 1	28	1	0	0	–		2 (Note: Appearances in Menpora Cup.)	1	30	2
PSIS Semarang	2022–23	Liga 1	26	5	0	0	–		2 (Note: Appearances in Indonesia President's Cup.)	0	28	5
PSIS Semarang	2023–24	Liga 1	28	3	0	0	–		0	0	28	3
PSIS Semarang	2024–25	Liga 1	30	2	0	0	–		0	0	30	2
PSIS Semarang	Total		115	11	0	0	–		4	1	119	12
Java United	2025–26	Super League	5	0	0	0	–		0	0	5	0
Java United	2026–27	Super League	3	0	0	0	–		0	0	3	0
Persebaya Surabaya (loan)	2025–26	Super League	11	1	0	0	–		0	0	11	1
Career total			161	13	0	0	0	0	4	1	165	14
