= Widi Syarief =

Indonesian footballer (born 2003)

Personal information
- Full name: Mochammad Widi Syarief Hidayatullah
- Date of birth: 31 July 2003 (age 23)
- Place of birth: Surabaya, Indonesia
- Height: 1.81 m (5 ft 11 in)
- Position: Forward

Youth career
- 2018–2021: Persebaya Surabaya

Senior career*
Years	Team	Apps	(Gls)
2022–2024	Persebaya Surabaya	1	(0)
2023–2024	→ Persekat Tegal (loan)	11	(1)
2025	PSIS Semarang	4	(0)
- * Club domestic league appearances and goals as of 18 November 2025

Mochammad Widi Syarief Hidayatullah (born 31 July 2003) is an Indonesian professional footballer who plays as a forward.

== Club career ==
=== Persebaya Surabaya ===
He was signed for Persebaya Surabaya and played in Liga 1 in 2021 season. Widi made his first-team debut on 6 February 2022 in a match against Persipura Jayapura as a substitute for Ruy Arianto in the 46th minute at the Ngurah Rai Stadium, Denpasar.

==== Persekat Tegal (loan) ====
On 8 September 2023, Widi signed a contract with Liga 2 club Persekat Tegal, on loan from Persebaya Surabaya. Widi made his league debut on 10 September 2023 in a 2–0 away lose against Gresik United.

== International career ==
In October 2022, it was reported that Widi received a call-up from the Indonesia U20 for a training camp, in Turkey and Spain.

== Career statistics ==
=== Club ===
As of 18 November 2025

Club	Season	League			Cup		Continental		Other		Total	
Club	Season	Division	Apps	Goals	Apps	Goals	Apps	Goals	Apps	Goals	Apps	Goals
Persebaya Surabaya	2021–22	Liga 1	1	0	0	0	–		0	0	1	0
Persebaya Surabaya	2022–23	Liga 1	0	0	0	0	–		0	0	0	0
Persebaya Surabaya	2024–25	Liga 1	0	0	0	0	–		0	0	0	0
Persekat Tegal (loan)	2023–24	Liga 2	11	1	0	0	–		0	0	11	1
PSIS Semarang	2025–26	Championship	4	0	0	0	–		0	0	4	0
Career total			16	1	0	0	0	0	0	0	16	1
