= Arief Catur =

Indonesian footballer

Personal information
- Full name: Arief Catur Pamungkas
- Date of birth: 25 July 1999 (age 27)
- Place of birth: Mojokerto, Indonesia
- Height: 1.69 m (5 ft 7 in)
- Position: Full-back

Team information
- Current team: Persebaya Surabaya
- Number: 2

Youth career
- 2017–2019: Persebaya Surabaya
- 2021: PON Jatim

Senior career*
Years	Team	Apps	(Gls)
2021	Persikab Bandung	7	(0)
2022–	Persebaya Surabaya	106	(2)
- * Club domestic league appearances and goals as of 23 May 2026

Arief Catur Pamungkas (born 25 July 1999) is an Indonesian professional footballer who plays as an full-back for Super League club Persebaya Surabaya.

== Club career ==
=== Persikab Bandung ===
On 2021, Arif Catur signed a one-year contract with Liga 3 club Persikab Bandung. He made 7 league appearances for Persikab Bandung in the 2021 Liga 3 (Indonesia).

=== Persebaya Surabaya ===
He was signed for Persebaya Surabaya and played in Liga 1 in 2022–2023 season. Arief made his league debut on 25 July 2022 in a match against Persikabo 1973 at the Pakansari Stadium, Cibinong.

For his solid and consistent performances on the right side of Persebaya's defense during the 2025/26 season, he was included in the 2025–26 Super League Best XI.

== Career statistics ==
=== Club ===
As of 23 May 2026

Club	Season	League			Cup		Continental		Other		Total	
Club	Season	Division	Apps	Goals	Apps	Goals	Apps	Goals	Apps	Goals	Apps	Goals
Persikab Bandung	2021	Liga 3	7	0	0	0	–		0	0	7	0
Persebaya Surabaya	2022–23	Liga 1	21	0	0	0	–		1 (Note: Appearances in Indonesia President's Cup)	0	22	0
Persebaya Surabaya	2023–24	Liga 1	26	0	0	0	–		0	0	26	0
Persebaya Surabaya	2024–25	Liga 1	27	0	0	0	–		0	0	27	0
Persebaya Surabaya	2025–26	Super League	32	2	0	0	–		0	0	32	2
Career total			113	2	0	0	0	0	1	0	114	2

== Honours ==
=== Club ===
Persebaya Surabaya U20

- Elite Pro Academy U-20: 2019

Persikab Bandung

- Liga 3 West Java: 2021

Persebaya Surabaya

- Piala Presiden: 2026

Individual

- Super League Best XI: 2025–26
