= Bruno (footballer, born 1999) =

Brazilian footballer

Bruno Moreira
Personal information
- Full name: Bruno Moreira Soares
- Date of birth: 8 April 1999 (age 27)
- Place of birth: Cajamar, São Paulo, Brazil
- Height: 1.76 m (5 ft 9 in)
- Position: Winger

Team information
- Current team: Port
- Number: 11

Youth career
- –2018: Santos

Senior career*
Years	Team	Apps	(Gls)
2019–2021	Envigado	20	(1)
2020	→ Ansan Greeners (loan)	5	(1)
2020	→ Chungnam Asan (loan)	15	(2)
2021–2022	Persebaya Surabaya	29	(7)
2022–2023	Niki Volos	8	(0)
2023–2026	Persebaya Surabaya	90	(32)
2026–	Port	0	(0)
- * Club domestic league appearances and goals as of 23 May 2026

Bruno Moreira Soares (born 8 April 1999), simply known as Bruno, is a Brazilian professional footballer who plays as a winger for Thai League club Port.

== Career statistics ==
=== Club ===
As of 23 May 2026

Club	Season	League			Cup		Other		Total	
Club	Season	Division	Apps	Goals	Apps	Goals	Apps	Goals	Apps	Goals
Santos B	2018	–					3 (Note: Appearances in the Copa Paulista)	1	3	1
Envigado	2019	Categoría Primera A	20	1	2 (Note: Appearances in the Copa Colombia)	0	0	0	22	1
Ansan Greeners (loan)	2020	K League 2	5	1	0	0	0	0	5	1
Chungnam Asan (loan)	2020	K League 2	15	2	0	0	0	0	15	2
Persebaya Surabaya	2021–22	Liga 1	29	7	0	0	0	0	29	7
Niki Volos	2022–23	Super League Greece 2	8	0	0	0	0	0	8	0
Persebaya Surabaya	2023–24	Liga 1	31	10	0	0	0	0	31	10
Persebaya Surabaya	2024–25	Liga 1	31	10	0	0	0	0	31	10
Persebaya Surabaya	2025–26	Super League	28	12	0	0	0	0	28	12
Persebaya Surabaya	Total		119	39	0	0	0	0	119	39
Port	2026–27	Thai League 1	0	0	0	0	0	0	0	0
Career total			167	43	2	0	3	1	172	44
