= Mendonça (footballer, born 1995) =

Brazilian footballer

Personal information
- Full name: Jorge Ambrosio Mendonça
- Date of birth: 15 August 1995 (age 31)
- Place of birth: Rio de Janeiro, Brazil
- Height: 1.94 m (6 ft 4 in)
- Position: Centre-back

Team information
- Current team: Madura United
- Number: 95

Youth career
- 2018: Grêmio

Senior career*
Years	Team	Apps	(Gls)
2019	São Borja	11	(1)
2019–2020	São João de Ver	8	(2)
2020	Guarany	1	(0)
2020–2021	Nova Mutum	10	(1)
2022–2023	Manauara	4	(0)
2022	→ Porto Velho (loan)	4	(0)
2022	→ Luverdense (loan)	6	(0)
2023	Democrata	7	(0)
2023	→ Porto Velho (loan)	1	(0)
2023–2024	Nova Mutum	8	(0)
2024	Uberlândia	10	(0)
2024–2025	Ypiranga	13	(1)
2025	Retrô	10	(0)
2025–	Madura United	23	(4)
- * Club domestic league appearances and goals as of 6 September 2026

Jorge Ambrosio Mendonça (born 15 August 1995), simply known as Mendonça, is a Brazilian professional footballer who plays as a centre-back for Super League club Madura United.

== Club career ==
Born in Rio de Janeiro, Brazil, Mendonça is a youth product of Grêmio. In 2019, he signed for São João de Ver in Portugal. The following year, he joined Brazilian side Guarany Bage.

In 2024, Mendonça joined Uberlândia. He made his debut on 24 January in a 2–2 draw with Tombense in the 2024 Campeonato Mineiro.

=== Madura United ===
On 28 August 2025, he signed with Indonesian club Madura United.
