= Nehar Sadiki =

Macedonian association football player

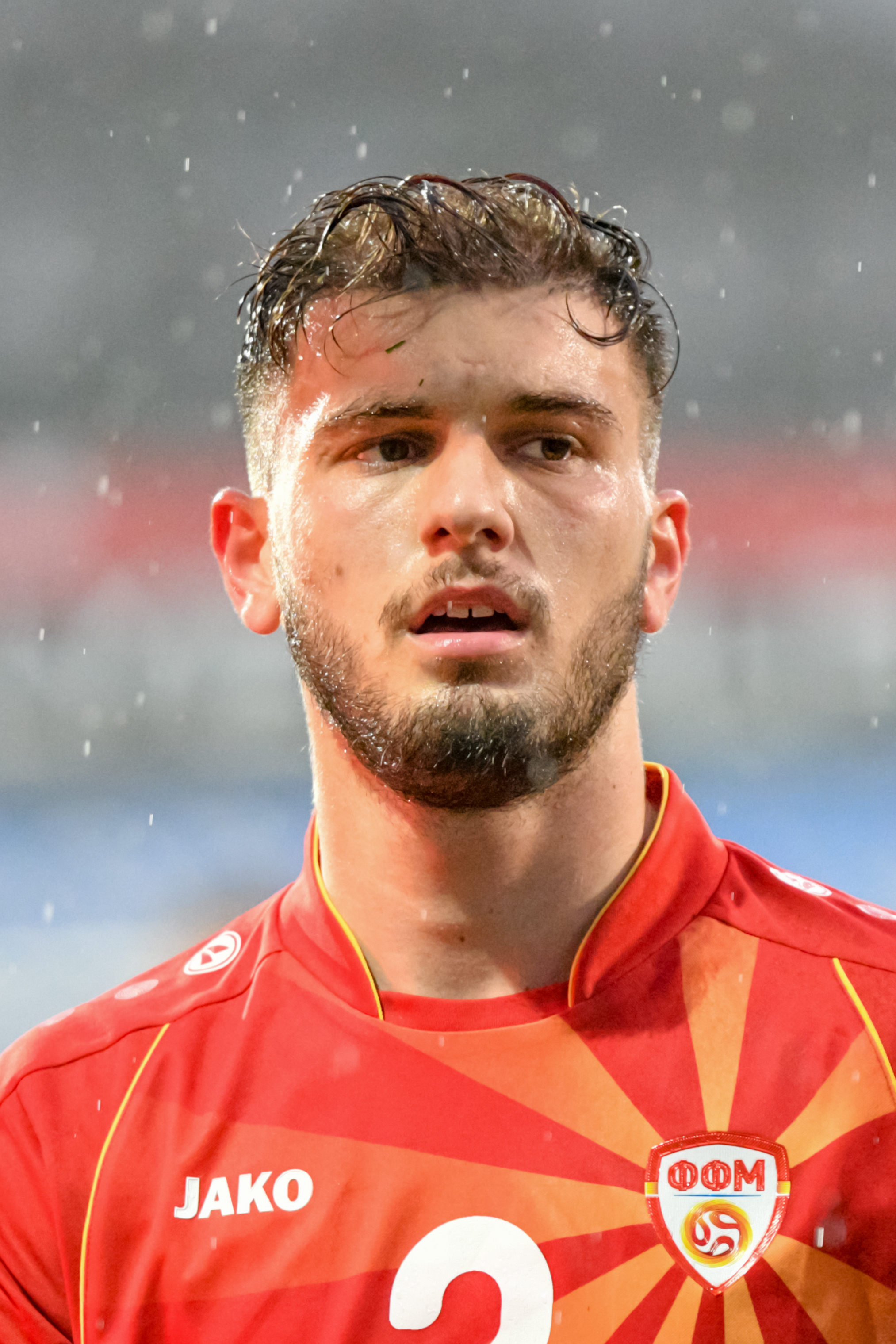
- Sadiki playing for North Macedonia U21 in 2019

Personal information
- Full name: Nehar Sadiki
- Date of birth: 16 March 1998 (age 28)
- Place of birth: Kumanovo, Macedonia
- Height: 1.95 m (6 ft 5 in)
- Position: Centre-back

Team information
- Current team: Bhayangkara Presisi
- Number: 4

Youth career
- 2015: Milano Kumanovë

Senior career*
Years	Team	Apps	(Gls)
2015	Rabotnichki	5	(0)
2015–2016	Gorno Lisiče	0	(0)
2016–2017	Rabotnichki	35	(3)
2019–2020	Renova	23	(1)
2020–2021	Hamrun Spartans	0	(0)
2021–2022	Borec	25	(0)
2022–2024	Erzeni Shijak	54	(2)
2024–2025	SKA-Khabarovsk	5	(0)
2025	Igman Konjic	8	(0)
2025–	Bhayangkara Presisi	33	(2)

International career^{‡}
2014	Macedonia U17	4	(0)
2016	Macedonia U18	3	(0)
2015–2016	Macedonia U19	6	(3)
2017–2019	Macedonia U21	4	(0)
- * Club domestic league appearances and goals as of 5 September 2026 ‡ National team caps and goals as of 24 March 2019

Nehar Sadiki (born 16 March 1998) is a Macedonian professional footballer who plays as a centre-back for Super League club Bhayangkara Presisi.

== Club career ==
Born in Kumanovo, Macedonia, Sadiki started his early career with joined KF Milano Kumanovë. In 2015, Sadiki officially signed with Rabotnichki. On 1 March 2015, he made his club debut, in a 1–0 win against Horizont Turnovo coming on as a substitute at the end of the match.

In July 2016, he re-joined with Rabotnichki, previously he plays for FK Gorno Lisiče. On 24 September 2016, he scored his first league goal for the club in his debut match against Shkëndija despite lose 1–3. On 14 May 2017, Sadiki scored equalizer in a 1–1 draw over Vardar. In the 2017/18 season, Sadiki became a key player for Rabotnicki, playing in 26 league matches and scoring two goal.

On 22 January 2019, Sadiki signed for Renova. In August 2020, Sadiki moved to Malta and joined Hamrun Spartans. But as he did not play a single match for the team, he returned to his country and signed a contract with Borec.

In July 2025, he was signed with Bhayangkara Presisi Lampung, marking his first club in Indonesia's top tier.

== Style of play ==
Standing at 1.95 m, Sadiki is a right-footed centre-back noted for his aerial dominance and strong physical presence. He occasionally deployed at defensive midfield, showing good tactical awareness and versatility.
