= Sávio Roberto =

Brazilian footballer

Personal information
- Full name: Sávio Roberto Juliao Figueiredo
- Date of birth: 30 April 1996 (age 30)
- Place of birth: Salvador, Bahia, Brazil
- Height: 1.89 m (6 ft 2 in)
- Position: Attacking midfielder

Team information
- Current team: Semen Padang
- Number: 96

Senior career*
Years	Team	Apps	(Gls)
2015–2018	Bahia	1	(0)
2016	→ Ypiranga (loan)	0	(0)
2017	→ Lagarto (loan)	0	(0)
2017	→ Marcílio Dias (loan)	0	(0)
2018–2019	Vitória Setúbal	4	(0)
2019–2021	Casa Pia	20	(1)
2021	Cianorte	2	(0)
2021	Pinhalnovense	4	(1)
2022	HIFK	11	(1)
2023	VPS	22	(3)
2024–2025	Esteghlal Khuzestan	22	(3)
2025–2026	PSM Makassar	27	(4)
2026–	Semen Padang	0	(0)
- * Club domestic league appearances and goals as of 17 May 2026

Sávio Roberto Juliao Figueiredo (born 30 April 1996) is a Brazilian professional footballer who plays as an attacking midfielder for Championship club Semen Padang.

== Club career ==
On 11 January 2022, he signed a one-year deal with HIFK in Finland.

On 21 January 2023, Sávio Roberto moved to a different Finnish club VPS. On 30 January 2024, the club announced that Savio's contract was terminated by mutual consent and the player will move to Iran.

Savio signed for Iranian Persian Gulf Pro League club Esteghlal Khuzestan in February 2024.

On 20 July 2025, Savio joined Indonesian Super League club PSM Makassar.

== Career statistics ==
As of 17 May 2026

Club	Season	League			National Cup		League Cup		Other		Total	
Club	Season	Division	Apps	Goals	Apps	Goals	Apps	Goals	Apps	Goals	Apps	Goals
Bahia	2015	Série B	1	0	1	0	0	0	1 (Note: Appearances in the Campeonato Baiano)	0	3	0
Bahia	2016	Série B	0	0	0	0	1 (Note: Appearances in the Copa do Nordeste)	0	0	0	1	0
Bahia	2017	Série A	0	0	0	0	0	0	0	0	0	0
Bahia	2018	Série A	0	0	0	0	0	0	0	0	0	0
Bahia	Total		1	0	1	0	1	0	1	0	4	0
Ypiranga-BA (loan)	2016		–		0	0	0	0	5 (Note: Appearances in the Campeonato Baiano A2)	0	5	0
Lagarto (loan)	2017		–		0	0	0	0	3 (Note: Appearances in the Campeonato Sergipano)	0	3	0
Marcílio Dias (loan)	2017		–		0	0	0	0	7 (Note: Appearances in the Campeonato Catarinense A2)	0	7	0
Vitória Setúbal	2018–19	Primeira Liga	4	0	0	0	0	0	0	0	4	0
Casa Pia	2019–20	Liga Portugal 2	13	1	1	0	2	0	–		16	1
Casa Pia	2020–21	Liga Portugal 2	7	0	1	0	0	0	–		8	0
Casa Pia	Total		20	1	2	0	1	0	–	–	23	1
Cianorte	2021	Série D	2	0	4	1	–		10 (Note: Appearances in the Campeonato Paranaense)	0	16	1
Pinhalnovense	2021–22	Campeonato de Portugal	4	1	–		–		–		4	1
HIFK	2022	Veikkausliiga	11	1	1	0	0	0	–		12	1
VPS	2023	Veikkausliiga	22	3	2	0	4	1	–		28	4
Esteghlal Khuzestan	2023–24	Persian Gulf Pro League	3	2	0	0	–		–		3	2
Esteghlal Khuzestan	2024–25	Persian Gulf Pro League	19	1	1	0	–		–		20	1
Esteghlal Khuzestan	Total		22	3	1	0	0	0	–	–	23	3
PSM Makassar	2025–26	Super League	27	4	–		–		–		27	4
Career total			113	13	11	1	6	1	26	0	156	15
