= Pedro Matos =

Portuguese footballer

Personal information
- Full name: Pedro Miguel Serra Matos
- Date of birth: 19 February 1997 (age 29)
- Place of birth: Trofa, Portugal
- Height: 1.78 m (5 ft 10 in)
- Position: Winger

Team information
- Current team: Varzim
- Number: 7

Youth career
- 2010–2011: Trofense
- 2011–2014: Rio Ave

Senior career*
Years	Team	Apps	(Gls)
2016–2017	Trofense	19	(5)
2017–2018	Braga B	6	(0)
2018–2019	Trofense	32	(5)
2019–2020	Estoril U23	33	(9)
2020–2021	Episkopi	0	(0)
2021–2025	Fafe	88	(15)
2025–2026	Persik Kediri	10	(0)
2026	Persekat Tegal	9	(3)
2026–	Varzim	0	(0)
- * Club domestic league appearances and goals as of 8 May 2026

Pedro Miguel Serra Matos (born 19 February 1997) is a Portuguese professional footballer who plays as a winger for Liga 3 club Varzim.

== Career ==
Born in Trofa, Portugal, Matos joined several local Portugal clubs, such as Trofense, Braga B and Estoril U23. He decided to go abroad for the first time to Greece, signed with Episkopi in the 2020 season.

On 4 February 2021, Liga 3 Portugal club Fafe announced a deal for Matos to join the team. Matos made his league debut for the club on 20 August 2022 as a starter in a 1–1 draw over São João de Ver. On 23 October 2022, Matos scored his first goal for Fafe in a 0–1 away win over Braga B. Although he never played in the previous season, this time, he contributed with 28 league appearances, and scoring five goals during the 2022–23 season.

On 12 November 2023, Matos scored his first goal of the 2023–24 season, the opening goal against Anadia in a 1–3 lose in the Liga 3. On 17 December 2023, Matos scored a brace for the club in a 2–3 win over Lusitânia. On 13 January 2024, he scored the winning goal for the club in a 0–1 away win against his former club Trofense and also named Man of the Match in his team's victory.

On 5 July 2025, he was signed with Persik Kediri, marking his first club in Indonesia's top tier.
