= Léo Lelis =

Brazilian footballer

Personal information
- Full name: Leonardo Silva Lelis
- Date of birth: 15 November 1993 (age 32)
- Place of birth: Ipuã, Brazil
- Height: 1.89 m (6 ft 2 in)
- Position: Centre-back

Team information
- Current team: Isenmulang Kalteng
- Number: 4

Youth career
- 2009: Comercial-SP
- 2009–2010: Vila Aurora
- 2010–2013: Fluminense

Senior career*
Years	Team	Apps	(Gls)
2013–2015	Fluminense	0	(0)
2013	→ Chicago Fire Premier (loan)	1	(0)
2013–2014	→ Fehérvár (loan)	0	(0)
2015	→ Paulista (loan)	3	(0)
2015	Coimbra	3	(0)
2016–2018	Kamza	16	(0)
2018	RTU	0	(0)
2019–2020	Valmiera	28	(3)
2021–2022	Persiraja Banda Aceh	29	(2)
2022–2023	Persebaya Surabaya	29	(5)
2023–2024	Borneo Samarinda	20	(3)
2024	Persikabo 1973	10	(1)
2025	Persijap Jepara	6	(1)
2025–2026	Persebaya Surabaya	22	(3)
2026–	Isenmulang Kalteng	3	(0)
- * Club domestic league appearances and goals as of 19 September 2026

Leonardo "Léo" Silva Lelis (born 15 November 1993) is a Brazilian professional footballer who plays as a centre-back for Super League club Isenmulang Kalteng.

== Club career ==
=== Persiraja Banda Aceh ===
In June 2021, Léo Lelis moved to Persiraja Banda Aceh in the Indonesian Liga 1. He made his professional debut for the club, in a 2–1 loss against Bhayangkara on 29 August 2021.

On 11 September 2021, he scored his first goal for Persiraja in a 3–2 win over PSS Sleman, where he scored with a header in the 5th minute.

He made 29 appearances and scored two goals while with Persiraja Banda Aceh for one season.

=== Persebaya Surabaya ===
Lelis was signed for Persebaya Surabaya to play in Liga 1 in the 2022–23 season. He made his league debut on 14 August 2022 in a match against Madura United at the Gelora Bung Tomo Stadium, Surabaya. On 1 October, Lelis scored his first league goal for Persebaya in an away win against Arema at the Kanjuruhan Stadium. Until the end of the match, the score was 2–3 for Persebaya over Arema, but after the match ended, a tragedy appeared called Kanjuruhan Stadium disaster, where the home fans rioted to the point of killing hundreds of victims. On 6 December, Lelis scored a brace for Persebaya in a 2–3 win against Barito Putera in the 12nd season of Liga 1.

== Honours ==
Persijap Jepara

- Liga 2 Promotion play-offs: 2024–25
