= Riquelme Sousa =

Brazilian professional footballer (born 2001)

Riquelme
Personal information
- Full name: Riquelme Sousa Silva
- Date of birth: 2 July 2001 (age 25)
- Place of birth: Goiás, Brazil
- Height: 1.78 m (5 ft 10 in)
- Position: Forward

Team information
- Current team: Bishkek City
- Number: 99

Youth career
- 2019–2020: Goianiense
- 2021: Bahia

Senior career*
Years	Team	Apps	(Gls)
2020	→ Anapolina (loan)	3	(1)
2021	→ Anápolis (loan)	10	(0)
2022	Goiatuba	3	(0)
2022–2023	Vila Nova	4	(0)
2023	Campinense	1	(0)
2023–2024	Vršac	41	(5)
2025	Abdysh-Ata Kant	25	(11)
2026	Madura United	17	(3)
2026–	Bishkek City	2	(0)
- * Club domestic league appearances and goals as of 10 July 2026

Riquelme Sousa Silva (born 2 July 2001), is a Brazilian professional footballer who plays as a forward for Kyrgyz Premier League club Bishkek City.

== Club career ==
Born in Uruaçu, Goiás, Brazil, Riquelme represented Goianiense as a youth. In 2019, he was the top scorer for Goianiense in the São Paulo Junior Football Cup with five goals, and even had a chance to play for the first team, but the following year he was loaned to Anapolina.

In January 2021, Riquelme was loaned to Anápolis, and moved to Bahia of the mid 2021 campaign.

In 2025, he went to Kyrgyzstan and joined the Kyrgyz Premier League club Abdysh-Ata Kant until the end of the year. Previously, he had moved to Serbia, joined Vršac. On 6 March 2025, he scored his first league goal in his debut match for Abdysh-Ata Kant against Ilbirs Bishkek in a 2–0 win.

== Honours ==
Abdysh-Ata Kant

- Kyrgyzstan Super Cup: 2025
