= Koko Ari Araya =

Indonesian footballer (born 2000)

Koko Ari
Personal information
- Full name: Koko Ari Araya
- Date of birth: 9 January 2000 (age 26)
- Place of birth: Surabaya, Indonesia
- Height: 1.81 m (5 ft 11 in)
- Position: Full-back

Team information
- Current team: Persebaya Surabaya
- Number: 33

Youth career
- 2017–2019: Persebaya Surabaya

Senior career*
| Years | Team | Apps | (Gls) |
| 2019–2023 | Persebaya Surabaya | 42 | (0) |
| 2023–2025 | Madura United | 57 | (0) |
| 2025– | Persebaya Surabaya | 15 | (0) |

International career^{‡}
| 2022 | Indonesia | 2 | (0) |
- * Club domestic league appearances and goals as of 23:09, 23 May 2026 (UTC) ‡ National team caps and goals as of 15 June 2022

Koko Ari Araya (born 9 January 2000), commonly known as Koko Ari, is an Indonesian professional footballer who plays as a full-back for Super League club Persebaya Surabaya.

== Club career ==
=== Persebaya Surabaya ===
Koko Ari debuted for Persebaya in the 2019 Liga 1 season. However, he became recognized in the 2020 Piala Gubernur Jatim tournament, a pre-season competition ahead of the 2020 Liga 1 season, after he was instrumental in the club's successes in winning the trophy. His performance there caught the eye of Indonesia national football team coach Shin Tae-yong who has called him up in the senior team training program since 2020.

=== Madura United ===
Koko Ari was signed for Madura United to play in Liga 1 in the 2023–24 season. He made his debut on 2 July 2023 in a match against Persib Bandung at the Gelora Bandung Lautan Api Stadium, Bandung.

=== Return to Persebaya Surabaya ===
On 4 June 2025, Koko Ari officially returned to Persebaya Surabaya.

== International career ==
Koko Ari received a call to join the senior Indonesia team for the 2022 FIFA World Cup qualification in June 2021.

On 1 June 2022, Koko Ari earned his first senior cap in a friendly match against Bangladesh that ended 0-0.

== Career statistics ==
=== Club ===
As of 23 May 2026

| Club | Season | League | | | Cup | | Continental | | Other | | Total | |
| Club | Season | Division | Apps | Goals | Apps | Goals | Apps | Goals | Apps | Goals | Apps | Goals |
|---|---|---|---|---|---|---|---|---|---|---|---|---|
| Persebaya Surabaya | 2019 | Liga 1 | 2 | 0 | 0 | 0 | — | | 0 | 0 | 2 | 0 |
| Persebaya Surabaya | 2020 | Liga 1 | 2 | 0 | 0 | 0 | — | | 0 | 0 | 2 | 0 |
| Persebaya Surabaya | 2021–22 | Liga 1 | 11 | 0 | 0 | 0 | — | | 4 (Note: Appearances in Menpora Cup) | 0 | 15 | 0 |
| Persebaya Surabaya | 2022–23 | Liga 1 | 27 | 0 | 0 | 0 | — | | 0 | 0 | 27 | 0 |
| Persebaya Surabaya | Total | | 42 | 0 | 0 | 0 | — | | 4 | 0 | 46 | 0 |
| Madura United | 2023–24 | Liga 1 | 33 | 0 | 0 | 0 | — | | 0 | 0 | 33 | 0 |
| Madura United | 2024–25 | Liga 1 | 24 | 0 | 0 | 0 | 4 (Note: Appearances in AFC Challenge League) | 0 | 0 | 0 | 28 | 0 |
| Madura United | Total | | 57 | 0 | 0 | 0 | 4 | 0 | 0 | 0 | 61 | 0 |
| Persebaya Surabaya | 2025–26 | Super League | 15 | 0 | 0 | 0 | 0 | 0 | 0 | 0 | 15 | 0 |
| Career total | | | 114 | 0 | 0 | 0 | 4 | 0 | 4 | 0 | 122 | 0 |

=== International ===
As of match played 14 June 2022

Indonesia national team
| Year | Apps | Goals |
|---|---|---|
| 2022 | 2 | 0 |
| Total | 2 | 0 |

== Honours ==
=== Club ===
Persebaya Surabaya U-20

- Elite Pro Academy U-20: 2019

Persebaya Surabaya

- Piala Presiden: 2026
- East Java Governor Cup: 2020
