= Aloísio Neto =

Brazilian footballer (born 1997)

Personal information
- Full name: Aloísio Soares Neto
- Date of birth: 16 August 1997 (age 29)
- Place of birth: Niterói, Brazil
- Height: 1.87 m (6 ft 2 in)
- Position: Centre-back

Team information
- Current team: PSM Makassar
- Number: 2

Youth career
- Nacional

Senior career*
Years	Team	Apps	(Gls)
2016–2017	São Martinho	10	(2)
2017–2022	Marítimo B	90	(8)
2018–2022	Marítimo	2	(0)
2022–2023	Vitória de Setúbal	2	(0)
2023	Sanjoanense	13	(0)
2023–2024	Académica de Coimbra	24	(2)
2024–	PSM Makassar	65	(7)
- * Club domestic league appearances and goals as of 6 September 2026

Aloísio Soares Neto (born 16 August 1997) is a Brazilian professional footballer who plays for as a centre-back for Super League club PSM Makassar.

== Football career ==
On 28 July 2018, Aloísio Neto made his debut in the first team, in a Taça da Liga match, winning 3–0 against Mafra.

On 31 October 2018, Aloísio Neto scored his first goal in the first team, in a Taça da Liga match, losing 3–2 against Feirense
