= Dejan Tumbas =

Serbian footballer

Personal information
- Full name: Dejan Tumbas
- Date of birth: 5 August 1999 (age 27)
- Place of birth: Krivaja, FR Yugoslavia
- Height: 1.85 m (6 ft 1 in)
- Positions: Forward; left-back

Team information
- Current team: Persis Solo
- Number: 19

Youth career
- 2015: Hajduk 1912
- 2016–2017: Partizan Academy

Senior career*
| Years | Team | Apps | (Gls) |
| 2017–2019 | Bačka | 27 | (10) |
| 2019–2020 | Dinamo Vranje | 40 | (8) |
| 2021–2023 | Kolubara | 29 | (0) |
| 2023 | Rudar Pljevlja | 16 | (4) |
| 2023 | Khujand | 2 | (0) |
| 2023–2024 | Sloboda Užice | 27 | (1) |
| 2024 | Khujand | 10 | (8) |
| 2025–2026 | Persebaya Surabaya | 30 | (0) |
| 2026– | Persis Solo | 14 | (3) |
| 2026– | → Penang (loan) | 0 | (0) |
- * Club domestic league appearances and goals as of 14 August 2026

Dejan Tumbas (Serbian Cyrillic: Дејан Тумбас; born 5 August 1999) is a Serbian professional footballer who plays as a forward or a left-back for Super League club Persis Solo.

== Club career ==
Born in Krivaja, FR Yugoslavia, Tumbas started off youth career in Hajduk 1912, a small club in Serbia with a long history. Then, he joined Partizan U19 in 2016. He started his senior career with joined numerous clubs in the Serbian First League and Serbian SuperLiga between 2017 until 2023.

=== Rudar Pljevlja ===
In 2023, Tumbas signed a contract with Montenegro team Rudar Pljevlja. He made his league debut for the club on 18 February 2023 as a substituted in a 0–1 lose against Mornar Bar. On 9 March 2023, he scored his first league goal for Rudar in a 2–3 away win against Petrovac. On 15 April 2023, he scored a brace for the club in a 3–1 home win against Iskra Danilovgrad. Tumbas added his fourth goals of the season on 7 May 2023 with one goal against Petrovac in a 4–2 home win.

=== Khujand ===
In August 2023, Tumbas decided to Tajikistan and sign a contract with Khujand. He made his club debut in a 1–1 draw against on 13 August 2023 as a substituted.

=== Sloboda Užice ===
On 16 September 2023, Sloboda Užice announced the signing of Tumbas. Tumbas made his club debut in a 0–0 draw over Mačva Šabac on 22 September 2023 as a starter.

=== Return to Khujand ===
On 18 July 2024, Tumbas left Sloboda Užice after eighth months, and he decided return to Khujand.
