= Rui Rampa =

Portuguese footballer

Personal information
- Full name: Rui Pedro Ribeiro Sousa Peixoto
- Date of birth: 6 September 1992 (age 34)
- Place of birth: Fafe, Portugal
- Height: 1.85 m (6 ft 1 in)
- Position: Centre-back

Youth career
- 2011–2012: Fafe

Senior career*
Years	Team	Apps	(Gls)
2013–2014	Pica	14	(0)
2014–2015	Arões	1	(0)
2015–2016	Vieira	30	(2)
2016–2017	Maria da Fonte	4	(0)
2017–2019	Arões	44	(5)
2019–2020	Pedras Salgadas	24	(1)
2020–2022	São Martinho	48	(1)
2022–2025	Felgueiras	71	(1)
2025–2026	Semen Padang	13	(1)
- * Club domestic league appearances and goals as of 22 December 2025

Rui Pedro Ribeiro Sousa Peixoto (born 6 September 1992), commonly known as Rui Rampa, is a Portuguese professional footballer who plays as a centre-back.

== Career ==
Rampa began his football career at the AD Fafe youth academy in Portugal before playing for several domestic clubs.

In June 2022, Rampa signed with Felgueiras. He made his league debut on 20 August in a 1–1 draw with Sanjoanense. On 4 March 2023, he scored his first league goal in a 2–4 loss to Anadia.

Rampa started the 2023–24 season by captaining the club for the first time in a match against Lusitânia on 9 August 2023. He was sent off with a red card in the 46th minute in a 0–0 draw. He helped the club secure second place in the standings, ensuring promotion to Liga Portugal 2.

In the following season, he finished the season with 22 appearances, leaving club at the conclusion of the season. In total, while playing for the club for three years, he made 78 appearances and scored 2 goals in all competitions.

On 2 July 2025, Rampa signed with Indonesian Super League club Semen Padang. On 15 August, he made his league debut in a match against Dewa United, playing the full 90 minute in a 2–0 win.
