= Eduardo Barbosa (footballer) =

Portuguese professional footballer (born 2003)

Personal information
- Full name: Eduardo Miguel Ramos Barbosa
- Date of birth: 18 January 2003 (age 23)
- Place of birth: Paços de Ferreira, Portugal
- Height: 1.80 m (5 ft 11 in)
- Position: Midfielder

Team information
- Current team: Persik Kediri
- Number: 20

Youth career
- 2016–2022: Sporting CP
- 2020: → Paços de Ferreira (loan)
- 2022–2023: Famalicão U23

Senior career*
Years	Team	Apps	(Gls)
2024–2025	Vilaverdense	26	(0)
2025–2026	PSBS Biak	27	(2)
2026–	Persik Kediri	8	(2)
- * Club domestic league appearances and goals as of 31 October 2026

Eduardo Miguel Ramos Barbosa (born 18 January 2003) is a Portuguese professional footballer who plays as a midfielder for Super League club Persik Kediri.

== Club career ==
Born in Paços de Ferreira, Portugal, Barbosa is a youth product from Sporting CP since 2016, and also played for the U19 team. He was loaned to Paços de Ferreira youth in 2020, before returning to Sporting the following year. In July 2021, he signed his first professional contract with Sporting.

In July 2022, Barbosa left Sporting and officially joined the Famalicão U23. He contributed with 23 appearances and 2 assists with Famalicão U23 for a season. Ahead of 2024–25 season, Barbosa signed a contract with Vilaverdense, he made 27 appearances and scored one goal for Vilaverdense in all competitions during the 2024–25 season, logging a total of 1,825 minutes of playing time.

=== PSBS Biak ===
In July 2025, Barbosa making his first experience abroad, completed a transfer to Indonesian Super League club PSBS Biak. On 11 August 2025, he made his league debut for the club in a 4–1 away lose over Arema, coming on as a starter and played full 90 minutes. On 29 December 2025, he scored his first league goal for Badai Pasifik against PSIM Yogyakarta, opening the scoring in a 2–2 draw. He added his second goals of the season on 27 February 2026 with one goal against PSIM Yogyakarta in a 2–4 home lose. Despite making 27 appearances and scoring two goals during a respectable individual first year abroad, Barbosa's contract was cut short when he decided to return to Portugal in May 2026 amid reports of unpaid wages and the club's relegation from the Super League.

=== Persik Kediri ===
Following his return to Indonesia in August 2026, Barbosa opted to remain in the country and joined Persik Kediri ahead of the 2026–27 season. He made his league debut for Persik on 5 September 2026, coming on as a starter in a 0–1 home lose against Dewa United Banten at the Brawijaya Stadium.

== Career statistics ==
=== Club ===
As of 31 October 2026

Club	Season	League		Cup		Continental		Other		Total	
Club	Season	Apps	Goals	Apps	Goals	Apps	Goals	Apps	Goals	Apps	Goals
Vilaverdense	2024–25	26	0	2 (Note: Appearances in Taça de Portugal)	1	–		0	0	28	1
PSBS Biak	2025–26	27	2	0	0	—		0	0	27	2
Persik Kediri	2026–27	8	2	0	0	—		0	0	8	2
Career total		60	4	2	1	0	0	0	0	62	4
