= Bruno Paraíba =

Brazilian footballer (born 1994)

Personal information
- Full name: Bruno Pereira de Albuquerque
- Date of birth: 20 July 1994 (age 32)
- Place of birth: João Pessoa, Paraíba, Brazil
- Height: 1.89 m (6 ft 2 in)
- Position: Forward

Team information
- Current team: Song Lam Nghe An
- Number: 83

Youth career
- –2014: CSP

Senior career*
Years	Team	Apps	(Gls)
2014–2017	CSP		
2014	→ Miramar (loan)		
2015	→ Paraíba (loan)		
2016	→ Nacional-PB (loan)		
2017	São Paulo Crystal		
2018	Nacional de Patos		
2018–2019	Barbalha	18	(8)
2019–2020	Oeste	21	(4)
2020	Confiança	26	(2)
2021	Brasil de Pelotas	9	(3)
2021–2023	Figueirense	28	(6)
2022	→ Ventforet Kofu (loan)	15	(2)
2023	Botafogo-PB	7	(0)
2023	FC Anyang	15	(4)
2024–2025	Gimpo FC	41	(3)
2025	Cheonan City	16	(5)
2026	Persebaya Surabaya	11	(5)
2026–	Song Lam Nghe An	2	(2)
- * Club domestic league appearances and goals as of 12 September 2026

Bruno Pereira de Albuquerque (born 20 July 1994), commonly known as Bruno Paraíba, is a Brazilian footballer who plays as a forward for V.League 1 club Song Lam Nghe An.

== Club career ==
In August 2026, Bruno joined V.League 1 side Song Lam Nghe An.

== Career statistics ==
=== Club ===
As of 9 February 2022.

Appearances and goals by club, season and competition
Club	Season	League			State league		National cup		Other		Total	
Club	Season	Division	Apps	Goals	Apps	Goals	Apps	Goals	Apps	Goals	Apps	Goals
Barbalha	2018	—			7 (Note: Appearances in the Campeonato Cearense Série B)	1	0	0	0	0	7	1
Barbalha	2019	—			11 (Note: Appearances in the Campeonato Cearense)	7	0	0	0	0	11	7
Barbalha	Total		0	0	18	8	0	0	0	0	18	8
Oeste	2019	Série B	12	3	3 (Note: Appearances in the Campeonato Paulista)	0	0	0	0	0	15	3
Oeste	2020	Série B	0	0	6	1	2 (Note: Appearances in the Copa do Brasil)	0	0	0	8	1
Oeste	Total		12	3	9	1	2	0	0	0	23	4
Confiança	2020	Série B	26	2	0	0	0	0	0	0	26	2
Brasil de Pelotas	2021	Série B	0	0	9 (Note: Appearances in the Campeonato Gaúcho)	3	0	0	0	0	9	3
Figueirense	2021	Série C	17	5	0	0	0	0	11 (Note: Appearances in the Copa Santa Catarina)	4	28	9
Ventforet Kofu	2022	J2 League	0	0	—		0	0	0	0	0	0
Career total			55	10	36	12	2	0	11	4	104	26
