= Miloš Raičković (footballer) =

Montenegrin footballer

Personal information
- Date of birth: 2 December 1993 (age 32)
- Place of birth: Podgorica, FR Yugoslavia (present day Montenegro)
- Height: 1.87 m (6 ft 2 in)
- Position: Midfielder

Team information
- Current team: Persebaya Surabaya
- Number: 88

Youth career
- 200?—2010: Crvena Stijena
- 2010—2012: Budućnost Podgorica

Senior career*
Years	Team	Apps	(Gls)
2012–2017	Budućnost Podgorica	112	(10)
2017–2018	Sarawak	37	(3)
2019–2022	Budućnost Podgorica	78	(21)
2022–2023	Seongnam FC	15	(3)
2023	FC Aktobe	24	(1)
2024	Budućnost Podgorica	15	(0)
2025	Otrant-Olympic	16	(1)
2025–	Persebaya Surabaya	30	(3)

International career^{‡}
2010	Montenegro U17	9	(2)
2011–2012	Montenegro U19	7	(1)
2013–2014	Montenegro U21	4	(0)
2020–	Montenegro	18	(0)
- * Club domestic league appearances and goals as of 2 May 2026 ‡ National team caps and goals as of 14 June 2022

Miloš Raičković (Montenegrin: Милош Раичковић; born 2 December 1993) is a Montenegrin professional footballer who plays as a midfielder for Super League club Persebaya Surabaya.

== Club career ==
=== FK Buducnost Podgorica ===
A product of the Crvena Stijena from Tološi, a suburb of Podgorica, and the Buducnost Podgorica youth systems, Raičković helped his team clinch the 2012–13 Montenegrin Cup aged 19, making 112 appearances in all competitions during his time there and winning the 2016-17 Montenegrin First League trophy.

=== Sarawak FA ===
Attracted by the prospect of playing professionally overseas in Asia, the Montenegrin signed for Sarawak of the Malaysia Super League in the summer of 2017 as the club needed a player to improve their midfield. Arriving in Malaysia, the midfielder praised his teammates for their friendliness in helping him adapt, with Sarawak coach David Usop confident on his quality as well. Raickovic responded to this with an important goal for his team in the 65th minute of the 2017 Malaysia Cup group stage 5th round, beating Selangor 2–1. He was also complimented by his coach for leading the attack and displaying good control in a 2–0 triumph over Kelantan, Sarawak's third win in the 2017 Malaysia Super League.

=== Seongnam FC ===
On 17th June 2022, Raičković joined Seongnam FC of South Korean K League 1.

== International career ==
Recording 20 appearances with the youth categories of the Montenegro national team, Raickovic has stated his ambition to represent the senior team of Montenegro internationally. He made his senior debut in an October 2020 friendly match against Latvia.

== Playing style ==
Raičković can operate as either a central midfielder or defensive midfielder and is known for his sagacious attacking movements and vision for an accurate pass. In addition, he specializes in long shots and can move up in attack as well.

== Honours ==
Buducnost Podgorica

- Montenegrin First League: 2016–17, 2019–20, 2020–21
- Montenegrin Cup: 2012–13, 2018–19, 2020–21
