= Kadek Raditya =

Indonesian footballer

Personal information
- Full name: Kadek Raditya Maheswara
- Date of birth: 13 June 1999 (age 27)
- Place of birth: Denpasar, Indonesia
- Height: 1.78 m (5 ft 10 in)
- Position: Centre-back

Team information
- Current team: Persis Solo (on loan from Persebaya Surabaya)
- Number: 32

Youth career
- SKO Ragunan

Senior career*
Years	Team	Apps	(Gls)
2018	Persiba Balikpapan	5	(0)
2019–2023	Madura United	34	(1)
2023–	Persebaya Surabaya	58	(1)
2026–	→ Persis Solo (loan)	17	(0)

International career^{‡}
2017–2018	Indonesia U19	6	(0)
Medal record
Men's football
Representing Indonesia
AFF U-19 Youth Championship
Third place	2017 Myanmar
Third place	2018 Indonesia	Team
- * Club domestic league appearances and goals as of 23 May 2026 ‡ National team caps and goals as of 14 July 2019

Kadek Raditya Maheswara (born 13 June 1999) is an Indonesian professional footballer who plays as a centre-back for Championship club Persis Solo, on loan from Persebaya Surabaya.

== Club career ==
=== Persiba Balikpapan ===
Raditya was born in Denpasar and started his professional career with Persiba Balikpapan in 2018.

=== Madura United ===
He was signed for Madura United to play in the Liga 1 in the 2019 season. Kadek Raditya made his league debut on 5 October 2019 in a match against Persib Bandung at the Gelora Bangkalan Stadium, Bangkalan. On 14 December 2021, Maheswara scored his first goal for Madura United against Borneo in the 5th minute at the Manahan Stadium, Surakarta.

=== Persebaya Surabaya ===
On 29 June 2023, Raditya signed for Persebaya Surabaya of Liga 1. He made his debut on 1 July against Persis Solo at the Manahan Stadium, Surakarta.

== International career ==
In 2018, Kadek represented the Indonesia U-19, in the 2018 AFC U-19 Championship.

== Career statistics ==
=== Club ===
As of match played 23 May 2026

Club	Season	League			Cup		Continental		Other		Total	
Club	Season	Division	Apps	Goals	Apps	Goals	Apps	Goals	Apps	Goals	Apps	Goals
Persiba Balikpapan	2018	Liga 2	5	0	0	0	–		0	0	5	0
Madura United	2019	Liga 1	7	0	0	0	–		0	0	7	0
Madura United	2020	Liga 1	0	0	0	0	–		0	0	0	0
Madura United	2021–22	Liga 1	11	1	0	0	–		1 (Note: Appearances in Menpora Cup)	0	12	1
Madura United	2022–23	Liga 1	16	0	0	0	–		4 (Note: Appearances in Indonesia President's Cup)	0	20	0
Madura United	Total		34	1	0	0	–		5	0	39	1
Persebaya Surabaya	2023–24	Liga 1	27	1	0	0	–		0	0	27	1
Persebaya Surabaya	2024–25	Liga 1	28	0	0	0	–		0	0	28	0
Persebaya Surabaya	2025–26	Super League	3	0	0	0	–		0	0	3	0
Persis Solo (loan)	2025–26	Super League	17	0	0	0	–		0	0	17	0
Career total			114	2	0	0	0	0	5	0	119	2

== Honours ==
=== International ===
Indonesia U-19

- AFF U-19 Youth Championship third Place: 2017, 2018
