= Jefferson (footballer, born 1997) =

Brazilian footballer

Personal information
- Full name: Jefferson Junio Antonio da Silva
- Date of birth: 3 January 1997 (age 29)
- Place of birth: Jaraguá, Goiás, Brazil
- Height: 1.76 m (5 ft 9 in)
- Position: Left-back

Team information
- Current team: Persebaya Surabaya
- Number: 17

Youth career
- 2009–2015: Goiás

Senior career*
Years	Team	Apps	(Gls)
2016–2021	Goiás	120	(2)
2021–2024	Atlético Goianiense	71	(1)
2023	→ Vasco da Gama (loan)	0	(0)
2024	→ Juventude (loan)	6	(0)
2024–2025	Guarani	30	(0)
2025	Operário Ferroviário	8	(0)
2026–	Persebaya Surabaya	18	(1)
- * Club domestic league appearances and goals as of 5 September 2026

Jefferson Junio Antonio da Silva (born 3 January 1997), simply known as Jefferson, is a Brazilian footballer who plays as a left-back for Indonesian club Persebaya Surabaya.

== Club career ==
Born in Jaraguá, Goiás, Jefferson joined Goiás' youth setup in 2009, aged 12. Promoted to the first team for the 2016 season, he made his senior debut on 10 April of that year, starting in a 5–3 Campeonato Goiano away win against Trindade.

Jefferson made his Série B debut on 13 May 2016, playing the full 90 minutes in a 1– away defeat of Tupi. Regularly used in his first year, he subsequently became a backup option, contributing with only two league matches in Goiás' promotion campaign.

Jefferson became a first-choice for the 2019 season, and made his Série A debut on 28 April, starting in a 1–0 away win against Fluminense. He scored his first goal in the category on 10 June, netting his team's second in a 3–1 home defeat of Chapecoense. On 19 September, he extended his contract until 2022.

== Career statistics ==
=== Club ===
As of 23 May 2026

Appearances and goals by club, season and competition
Club	Season	League			State league		National Cup		Continental		Other		Total	
Club	Season	Division	Apps	Goals	Apps	Goals	Apps	Goals	Apps	Goals	Apps	Goals	Apps	Goals
Goiás	2016	Série B	18	0	1 (Note: Appearance(s) in Campeonato Goiano)	0	—		—		—		19	0
Goiás	2017	Série B	4	0	3	0	2	0	—		—		9	0
Goiás	2018	Série B	2	0	11	0	5	1	—		—		18	1
Goiás	2019	Série A	33	1	6	0	2	1	—		1 (Note: Appearance(s) in Copa Verde)	0	42	2
Goiás	2020	Série A	26	1	6	0	2	0	2 (Note: Appearance(s) in Copa Sudamericana)	0	—		36	1
Goiás	2021	Série B	2	0	8	0	—		—		—		10	0
Goiás	Total		85	2	35	0	11	2	2	0	1	0	134	4
Atlético Goianiense	2021	Série A	5	0	—		—		—		—		5	0
Atlético Goianiense	2022	Série A	33	1	7	0	6	0	10	0	—		56	1
Atlético Goianiense	2023	Série B	13	0	13	0	2	0	—		—		28	0
Atlético Goianiense	2024	Série A	0	0	—		0	0	—		—		0	0
Atlético Goianiense	Total		51	1	20	0	8	0	10	0	—		89	1
Vasco da Gama (loan)	2023	Série A	0	0	—		—		—		—		0	0
Juventude (loan)	2024	Série A	0	0	6 (Note: Appearance(s) in Campeonato Gaúcho)	0	0	0	—		—		6	0
Guarani	2024	Série B	30	0	—		—		—		—		30	0
Operário Ferroviário	2025	Série B	8	0	—		—		—		—		8	0
Persebaya Surabaya	2025–26	Super League	17	1	—		—		—		—		17	1
Career Total			191	4	61	0	19	2	12	0	1	0	278	6

== Honours ==
Atlético Goianiense

- Campeonato Goiano: 2022

Persebaya Surabaya

- Piala Presiden: 2026
