= Francisco Rivera (Mexican footballer) =

Mexican footballer (born 1994)

Personal information
- Full name: Francisco Israel Rivera Dávalos
- Date of birth: 23 September 1994 (age 32)
- Place of birth: San Luis Potosí, Mexico
- Height: 1.70 m (5 ft 7 in)
- Position: Attacking midfielder

Team information
- Current team: Persebaya Surabaya
- Number: 7

Youth career
- 2011–2013: San Luis
- 2013–2015: América

Senior career*
Years	Team	Apps	(Gls)
2015–2017	América	8	(0)
2016	→ Veracruz (loan)	9	(0)
2017	→ Alebrijes (loan)	8	(0)
2017–2019	Zacatecas	44	(1)
2019	Monagas	13	(1)
2020	Atlante	8	(3)
2020	Querétaro	5	(0)
2021	Zacatecas	71	(6)
2021–2023	Llapi	73	(17)
2023–2024	Madura United	36	(9)
2024–	Persebaya Surabaya	59	(21)
- * Club domestic league appearances and goals as of 23 May 2026

Francisco Israel Rivera Dávalos (born 23 September 1994) is a Mexican professional footballer who plays as an attacking midfielder for Super League club Persebaya Surabaya.

== Honours ==
América

- CONCACAF Champions League: 2014–15, 2015–16

KF Llapi

- Kosovar Supercup: 2021

Persebaya Surabaya

- Piala Presiden: 2026

Individual

- Liga 1 Player of the Month: August 2023
- Liga 1 Goal of the Month: December 2023
- Liga 1 Best Player: 2023–24
- Liga 1/Super League Team of the Season: 2023–24, 2025–26
- APPI Indonesian Football Award Best XI: 2023–24
- Piala Presiden Best Player: 2026
