= Gelora Ratu Pamelingan Stadium =

Football stadium in Indonesia

Gelora Madura Ratu Pamelingan Stadium
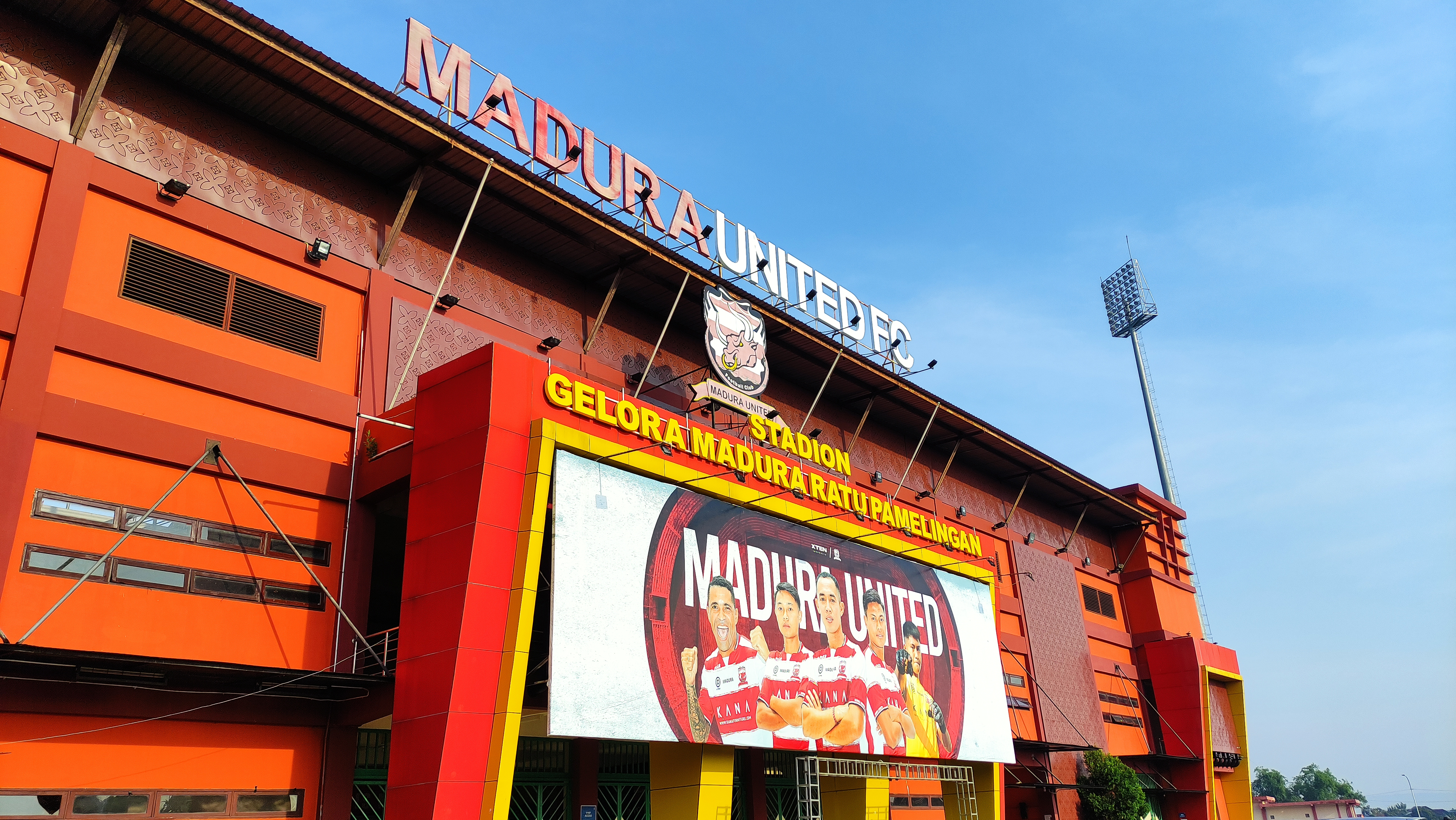

- Location in Java
- Location: Tlanakan, Pamekasan Regency, East Java, Indonesia
- Coordinates: 7°11′40″S 113°28′51″E
- Owner: Regency government of Pamekasan
- Operator: Madura United
- Capacity: 7,000

Construction
- Opened: 18 November 2016
- Renovated: 2023–2024

Tenants
- Madura United; Persepam Pamekasan

Gelora Madura Ratu Pamelingan Stadium or SGMRP is a stadium in Tlanakan, Pamekasan Regency, East Java, Indonesia. It is mostly used for football matches and is the new home stadium of Madura United.

== History ==
The renovation started in December 2023 with the cost of Rp70 billion.
