= 2026–27 Persebaya Surabaya season =

Persebaya Surabaya
2026–27 season
- Owner: Koperasi Surya Abadi Persebaya (30%); PT DBL Indonesia (70%)
- President: Azrul Ananda
- Head coach: (Portugal) Bernardo Tavares
- Stadium: Gelora Bung Tomo
- Super League: 10th
Home colours	Away colours	Third colours
- All statistics correct as of 4 July 2026.

The 2026–27 season will be Persebaya Surabaya's 99th season in existence and its 9th consecutive seasons in top-flight following its success in getting promoted from the 2017 Liga 2. This will be Persebaya Surabaya's second season under head coach Bernardo Tavares.

== Squad ==
As of 17 July 2026

No.	Player	Nationality	Date of birth (age)	Previous club	Notes
Goalkeepers
21	Ernando Ari	(Indonesia)	27 February 2002 (age 24)	(Indonesia) Persebaya U-20	
30	Reza Arya Pratama	(Indonesia)	18 May 2000 (age 26)	(Indonesia) PSM Makassar	
39	Ilham Al-Arif	(Indonesia)	7 May 2007 (age 19)	(Indonesia) Persebaya U-20	
Defenders
2	Arief Catur	(Indonesia)	25 July 1999 (age 27)	(Indonesia) Persikab Bandung	
4	Yuran Fernandes	(Cape Verde)	19 October 1994 (age 32)	(Indonesia) PSM Makassar	
5	Risto Mitrevski	(North Macedonia)	5 October 1991 (age 35)	(Indonesia) Dewa United	
13	Syahrul Lasinari	(Indonesia)	24 December 1999 (age 26)	(Indonesia) PSM Makassar	
17	Jefferson Silva	(Brazil)	3 January 1997 (age 29)	(Brazil) Operário PR	
18	Randy May	(Indonesia)	21 September 2000 (age 26)	(Indonesia) Persiba Balikpapan	
25	Mikael Tata	(Indonesia)	10 May 2004 (age 22)	(Indonesia) Arema Malang	
31	Yusuf Meilana	(Indonesia)	4 May 1998 (age 28)	(Indonesia) Persik Kediri	
33	Koko Ari	(Indonesia)	9 January 2000 (age 26)	(Indonesia) Dewa United	
34	Wálber Mota	(Brazil)	12 June 1997 (age 29)	(Vietnam) Nam Dinh F.C.	
66	Sheva Kardanu	(Indonesia)	24 January 2005 (age 21)	(Indonesia) Persebaya U-20	
Midfielders
7	Francisco Rivera	(Mexico)	23 September 1994 (age 32)	(Indonesia) Madura United	
10	Matheus Lagoa	(Brazil)	13 March 1999 (age 27)	(Brazil) Anápolis	
12	Alfan Suaib	(Indonesia)	24 March 2004 (age 22)	(Indonesia) Persebaya U-20	
20	Diogo Ramalho	(Portugal)	1 July 1999 (age 27)	(Romania) FCV Farul Constanța	
40	Gledson Paixão	(Brazil)	18 May 1995 (age 31)	(Indonesia) PSM Makassar	
53	Rachmat Irianto	(Indonesia)	3 September 1999 (age 27)	(Indonesia) Persib Bandung	
55	Sadida Nugraha	(Indonesia)	26 April 2005 (age 21)	(Indonesia) Persebaya U-20	
66	Dicky Kurniawan	(Indonesia)	6 June 2002 (age 24)	(Indonesia) Persijap Jepara	
68	Toni Firmansyah	(Indonesia)	14 January 2005 (age 21)	(Indonesia) Persebaya U-20	
81	Ichsas Baihaqi	(Indonesia)	17 March 2007 (age 19)	(Indonesia) Persebaya U-20	
Forwards
9	Ramadhan Sananta	(Indonesia)	27 November 2002 (age 23)	(Brunei) DPMM FC	
11	Miguel Pereira	(Portugal)	31 January 1999 (age 27)	(Portugal) Lusitânia F.C.	
13	Dimas Adi Prasetyo	(Indonesia)	13 April 2008 (age 18)	(Indonesia) PSM Makassar	
14	Yann Mabella	(Republic of the Congo)	22 February 1996 (age 30)	(Malaysia) Terengganu FC	
16	Ricky Pratama	(Indonesia)	6 May 2003 (age 23)	(Indonesia) PSM Makassar	
39	Alex Martins	(Brazil)	8 July 1993 (age 33)	(Indonesia) Dewa United	
42	Saddil Ramdani	(Indonesia)	2 January 1999 (age 27)	(Indonesia) Persib Bandung	
77	Malik Risaldi	(Indonesia)	23 October 1996 (age 30)	(Indonesia) Madura United	

== Coaching staff ==
Position	Name
Head coach	(Portugal) Bernardo Tavares
Assistant coach	(Portugal) Paulo Renato Gonçalves Duarte
Assistant coach	(Indonesia) Uston Nawawi
Goalkeeper Coach	(Brazil) Felipe Americo Martins
Fitness coach	(Portugal) Diogo Andre Botelho Carvalho
Team Doctor	(Indonesia) Ahmad Ridhoi
Team Physiotherapist	(Brazil) Cadu Nunes Vieira (Indonesia) Dominggus Ruku Yudit (Indonesia) Samudra Anggara
Under-20's Head coach	(Indonesia) Sony Setiawan
Under-18's Head coach	(Indonesia) Mat Halil
Under-16's Head coach	(Indonesia) Khabib Syukron
Under-13's Head coach	(Indonesia) Dani Cantona

== Transfers ==
=== In ===
Date	Position	No	Player	From	Fee	Ref.
Pre-season
16 June 2026	GK	30	(Indonesia) Reza Arya Pratama	(Indonesia) PSM Makassar		
16 June 2026	DF	13	(Indonesia) Syahrul Lasinari	(Indonesia) PSM Makassar		
16 June 2026	DF		(Indonesia) Yusuf Meilana	(Indonesia) Persik Kediri		
16 June 2026	MF		(Indonesia) Dicky Kurniawan	(Indonesia) Persijap Jepara		
16 June 2026	FW		(Indonesia) Ricky Pratama	(Indonesia) PSM Makassar		
17 June 2026	FW	9	(Indonesia) Ramadhan Sananta	(Brunei) DPMM FC		
6 July 2026	DF		(Cape Verde) Yuran Fernandes	(Indonesia) PSM Makassar		
7 July 2026	MF		(Portugal) Diogo Ramalho	(Romania) FCV Farul Constanța		
8 July 2026	FW		(Republic of the Congo) Yann Mabella	(Malaysia) Terengganu FC		
8 July 2026	FW		(Portugal) Miguel Pereira	(Portugal) Lusitânia F.C.		
8 July 2026	FW		(Brazil) Alex Martins	(Indonesia) Dewa United		
10 July 2026	DF		(Brazil) Wálber Mota	(Vietnam) Nam Dinh F.C.		
11 July 2026	MF		(Brazil) Gledson Paixão	(Indonesia) PSM Makassar		
3 September 2026	MF		(Brazil) Matheus Lagoa	(Brazil) Anápolis		
Mid-season

=== Out ===
Date	Position	No	Player	To	Fee	Ref.
Pre-season
2 June 2026	FW	10	(Indonesia) Bruno Moreira	(Thailand) Port F.C.		
10 June 2026	FW	8	(Indonesia) Oktafianus Fernando			
10 June 2026	GK	52	(Indonesia) Andhika Ramadhani			
10 June 2026	DF	24	(Brazil) Léo Lelis	-		
10 June 2026	FW	83	(Brazil) Bruno Paraíba	-		
10 June 2026	DF	44	(Brazil) Gustavo Fernandes	-		
10 June 2026	MF	88	(Montenegro) Miloš Raičković	-		
10 June 2026	FW	11	(Montenegro) Mihailo Perović	-		
10 June 2026	DF	14	(Indonesia) Riyan Ardiansyah	(Indonesia) Malut United	End of loan	
10 June 2026	MF	16	(Portugal) Pedro Matos	(Indonesia) Semen Padang	End of loan	
4 August 2026	MF	26	(Indonesia) Dimas Wicaksono	(Indonesia) PSPS Pekanbaru		
Mid-season

=== Loans in ===
Date	Position	No	Player	From	Until	Ref.
Pre-season
8 September 2026	FW		(Indonesia) Saddil Ramdani	(Indonesia) Persib Bandung	End of Season	
Mid-season

=== Loans out ===
Date	Position	No	Player	From	Until	Ref.
Pre-season
6 July 2026	FW	22	(Timor-Leste) Gali Freitas	(Indonesia) Madura United	End of Season	
Mid-season

== Pre-season ==
Win Draw Loss

=== Friendly matches ===
19 July 2026 Friendly	Persebaya Surabaya	2-2	PSIS Semarang	Surabaya, East Java
15:30 UTC+7	Martins 35'; Mabella 53'		Sabda 74' 83'	Stadium: Gelora Bung Tomo

15 August 2026 Friendly	Persebaya Surabaya	1-0	Penang F.C.	Surabaya, East Java
20:00 UTC+7	Wálber 79'			Stadium: Gelora Bung Tomo

=== 2026 Piala Presiden ===
==== Group B ====
Pos	Team	Pld	W	D	L	GF	GA	GD	Pts	Qualification
1	(Indonesia) Persebaya (H)	3	3	0	0	4	1	+3	9	Advance to the Semi-Final
2	(Indonesia) Persija	3	1	1	1	6	4	+2	4	Advance to the Semi-Final
3	(Thailand) Port	3	1	1	1	5	4	+1	4	
4	(Indonesia) PSMS	3	0	0	3	1	7	−6	0	

First match(es) will be played: 26 July 2026. Source: Piala Presiden 2026
Rules for classification: Tiebreakers
(H) Hosts

26 July 2026	Persebaya	1–0	Persija	Surabaya, East Java
19:30 UTC+7	Pankov 63' (o.g.)			Stadium: Gelora Bung Tomo Stadium; Attendance: 45,000; Referee: Thoriq Munir Alkatiri (Bandung)

29 July 2026	PSMS	0–1	Persebaya	Surabaya, East Java
19:30 UTC+7			Yuran 45+1'	Stadium: Gelora Bung Tomo Stadium; Referee: Yudi Nurcahya (Indonesia)

1 August 2026	Persebaya	2–1	Port	Surabaya, East Java
15:30 UTC+7	Pereira 40'; Martins 47'		Al-Sabhi 30'	Stadium: Gelora Bung Tomo Stadium

==== Semifinals ====
4 August 2026	Persebaya	1-0	Arema F.C.	Gianyar, Bali
(20:00 UTC+7)	Y. Fernandes 45+7'	Report	Landis (red card) 66'	Stadium: Kapten I Wayan Dipta Stadium; Attendance: 0 Referee: Candra

==== Final ====
6 August 2026 Final	Persib	1–1 (a.e.t.) (5–6 p)	Persebaya	Gianyar, Bali
(20:00 UTC+7)	Matricardi 24'; Peralta (red card) 112'	Report	Sananta 20'	Stadium: Kapten I Wayan Dipta Stadium; Attendance: 0
	Penalties
	Barros (penalty missed); Matricardi (penalty scored); Tanque (penalty scored); Rudianto (penalty scored); César (penalty scored); Kusnandar (penalty scored); Hehanusa (penalty missed)		(penalty scored) Pereira; (penalty scored) Mitrevski; (penalty scored) Mabella; (penalty scored) Ramalho; (penalty missed) Fernandes; (penalty scored) Mota; (penalty scored) Paixão

== Competitions ==
=== Overview ===
Competition	First match	Last match	Starting round	Final position	Record							
Competition	First match	Last match	Starting round	Final position	Pld	W	D	L	GF	GA	GD	Win %
Indonesia Super League	4 September 2026	May 2027	Matchday 1		10	3	5	2	11	9	+2	30.00
Indonesia League Cup	3 November 2026	19 May 2027	Group stage	TBD	1	0	0	1	2	3	−1	0.00
Total					11	3	5	3	13	12	+1	27.27

Last updated: 21 November 2026
Source: Competitions

=== League table ===
Pos	Team	Pld	W	D	L	GF	GA	GD	Pts
7	Bhayangkara Presisi	10	3	6	1	13	11	+2	15
8	Java United (Note: Java United had 2 points deduction due to home base relocation.)	10	4	4	2	15	12	+3	14
9	Persebaya	10	3	5	2	11	9	+2	14
10	Garudayaksa	10	4	2	4	13	16	−3	14
11	Arema	10	3	3	4	20	20	0	12

Updated to match(es) played on 22 November 2026. Source: Super League 2026–27
Rules for classification: 1) Points; 2) Head-to-head points; 3) Head-to-head goal difference; 4) Head-to-head goals scored; 5) Goal difference; 6) Goals scored; 7) Fair-play points; 8) Draw.

=== Results summary ===
Overall								Home						Away					
Pld	W	D	L	GF	GA	GD	Pts	W	D	L	GF	GA	GD	W	D	L	GF	GA	GD
10	3	5	2	11	9	+2	14	2	4	0	9	6	+3	1	1	2	2	3	−1

==== Results by matchday ====
Matchday	1	2	3	4	5	6	7	8	9	10	11	12	13	14	15	16	17	18	19	20	21
Ground	A	H	H	A	H	A	H	H	A	H											
Result	D	W	D	W	D	L	W	D	L	D											
Position	8	7	8	6	7	9	7	7	8												

Updated to match(es) played on 5 September 2026. Source: Matches
A = Away; H = Home; W = Win; D = Draw; L = Loss; P = Postponed

=== Matches ===
Win Draw Loss Rescheduled

==== First round ====
5 September 2026 1	Bhayangkara Presisi	1-1	Persebaya Surabaya	Bandar Lampung
15:30 UTC+7	Ocampo (yellow card) 59'; Allano 60'	(LIB) (ILMS)	Mabella 13'; Rivera (yellow card) 51'; Mitrevski (yellow card) 59'; Toni (yellow card) 85'	Stadium: Sumpah Pemuda; Attendance: 3,058; Referee: Yudai Yamamoto

13 September 2026 2	Persebaya Surabaya	1-0	PSIM Yogyakarta	Surabaya
19:00 UTC+7	Irianto (yellow card) 37'; Martins 81'	(LIB) (ILMS)	Rudzan (yellow card) 22'; Purzycki (red card)	Stadium: Gelora Bung Tomo; Attendance: 15,116; Referee: Mustafa Kamal

19 September 2026 3	Persebaya Surabaya	1-1	Garudayaksa F.C.	Surabaya
15:30 UTC+7	Yuran (yellow card) 70'; Jefferson (yellow card) 80'; Martins 85'	(LIB) (ILMS)	Arif (yellow card) 39'; Kaka (yellow card) 46'; Stamenković (yellow card) 59'; Rubio (yellow card) 81'; Al Hamra 89'	Stadium: Gelora Bung Tomo; Attendance: 11,728; Referee: Sance Lawita

9 October 2026 4	Isenmulang Kalteng	0-1	Persebaya Surabaya	Bandar Lampung
19:00 UTC+7	Manneh (yellow card) 16'	(LIB) (ILMS)	Ramalho (yellow card) 33'; Paixão (yellow card) 40'; Martins 45+3' (pen.)	Stadium: Sumpah Pemuda; Attendance: 0 Referee: Axel Febrian Sinaga

18 October 2026 5	Persebaya Surabaya	2-2	PSS Sleman	Surabaya
15:30 UTC+7	Jefferson (yellow card) 24'; Pereira 36' 90+1'	(LIB) (ILMS)	Lorenzen 9'; Mutzi (yellow card) 19'; Tanaka 61'	Stadium: Gelora Bung Tomo; Attendance: 35,108; Referee: Yudai Yamamoto

22 October 2026 6	PSM Makassar	1-0	Persebaya Surabaya	Parepare
15:30 UTC+7	Yuran 74' (o.g.); Agung (red card) 90+3'; Ardiansyah (yellow card) 90+5'	(LIB) (ILMS)	Irianto (yellow card) 16'; Toni (yellow card) 90+1'	Stadium: Gelora B.J. Habibie; Attendance: 2,807; Referee: Yudi Nurcahya

26 October 2026 7	Persebaya Surabaya	3-1	Madura United	Surabaya
19:00 UTC+7	Pereira 22'; Mota (yellow card) 68'; Yuran 90+1' (pen.); Mabella 90+6'	(LIB) (ILMS)	Sitanggang (red card) 65'; Freitas 69'; Iran (yellow card) 83'; Monteiro (yellow card) 90'	Stadium: Gelora Bung Tomo; Attendance: 10,364; Referee: Eko Saputro

30 October 2026 8	Persebaya Surabaya	1-1	Persijap Jepara	Surabaya
19:00 UTC+7	Ricky (yellow card) 31'; Mitrevski 90+2'	(LIB) (ILMS)	Pirulo (yellow card) 12'; Kalezić 58'; Ambrizal (yellow card) 59'; Chica (yellow card) 86'	Stadium: Gelora Bung Tomo; Attendance: 9,188; Referee: Aidil Azmi

7 November 2026 9	Persija Jakarta	1–0	Persebaya Surabaya	Jakarta
19:00 UTC+7	Hannan (yellow card) 15'; Kolinger (yellow card) 31'; Mamut 89'	(LIB) (ILMS)	Mota (yellow card) 33'; Catur (yellow card) 44'	Stadium: Jakarta International Stadium; Attendance: 38,774; Referee: Yoko Suprianto

21 November 2026 10	Persebaya Surabaya	1–1	Java United	Surabaya
15:30 UTC+7	Pereira 3'; Irianto (yellow card) 86'; Jefferson (yellow card) 90+2'	(LIB) (ILMS)	Ridho 37'; Tavares (yellow card) 46'; Hirose (yellow card) 89'; Yakob (yellow card) 90+3'	Stadium: Gelora Bung Tomo; Attendance: 10,877; Referee: Axel Febrian Sinaga

=== Indonesia League Cup ===
==== Group G ====
Pos	Team	Pld	W	D	L	GF	GA	GD	Pts	Qualification
1	Kendal Tornado (2)	1	1	0	0	3	2	+1	3	Advance to round of 12
2	PSBS (2)	0	0	0	0	0	0	0	0	
3	Persebaya (1)	1	0	0	1	2	3	−1	0	

Updated to match(es) played on 3 November 2026. Source: 2026–27 I.League Cup
Rules for classification: 1) Points; 2) Head-to-head points; 3) Head-to-head goal difference; 4) Head-to-head goals scored; 5) Goal difference; 6) Goals scored; 7) Fair-play points; 8) Draw.

3 November 2026	Kendal Tornado (2)	3–2	Persebaya (1)	Surakarta
19:00	Akbar 59'; Dimas 86'; Cruz 90'	Report	Sananta 71'; Toni 78'	Stadium: Sriwedari; Attendance: 232; Referee: Candra

24 November 2026	Persebaya (1)	v	PSBS (2)	Surabaya
16:00		Report		Stadium: Gelora Bung Tomo Stadium

== Statistics ==
=== Squad appearances and goals ===
Last updated on 13 September 2026

Players with no appearances are not included on the list.

No.	Pos	Nat	Player	Total		Super League		Piala Indonesia	
No.	Pos	Nat	Player	Apps	Goals	Apps	Goals	Apps	Goals
Goalkeepers
21	GK	(Indonesia) IDN	Ernando Ari	5	0	4	0	1	0
24	GK	(Indonesia) IDN	Lutfi Masrohan	1	0	1	0	0	0
30	GK	(Indonesia) IDN	Reza Arya Pratama	5	0	5	0	0	0
Defenders
2	DF	(Indonesia) IDN	Arief Catur	11	0	9+1	0	0+1	0
4	DF	(Cape Verde) CPV	Yuran Fernandes	9	1	9	1	0	0
5	DF	(North Macedonia) MKD	Risto Mitrevski	11	1	6+4	1	1	0
17	DF	(Brazil) BRA	Jefferson	10	0	10	0	0	0
22	DF	(Indonesia) IDN	Syahrul Lasinari	6	0	1+4	0	1	0
31	DF	(Indonesia) IDN	Yusuf Meilana	1	0	0	0	1	0
33	DF	(Indonesia) IDN	Koko Ari	2	0	0+1	0	1	0
34	DF	(Brazil) BRA	Wálber Mota	9	0	9	0	0	0
Midfielders
7	MF	(Mexico) MEX	Francisco Rivera	8	0	6+1	0	0+1	0
10	MF	(Brazil) BRA	Matheus Lagoa	1	0	0+1	0	0	0
20	MF	(Portugal) POR	Diogo Ramalho	5	0	4+1	0	0	0
40	MF	(Brazil) BRA	Gledson Paixão	10	0	7+3	0	0	0
53	MF	(Indonesia) IDN	Rachmat Irianto	8	0	3+4	0	1	0
55	MF	(Indonesia) IDN	Sadida Nugraha	3	0	0+2	0	1	0
66	MF	(Indonesia) IDN	Dicky Kurniawan	1	0	0	0	1	0
68	MF	(Indonesia) IDN	Toni Firmansyah	11	1	7+3	0	0+1	1
72	MF	(Indonesia) IDN	Aleandro Maulana	1	0	0	0	1	0
Forwards
9	FW	(Indonesia) IDN	Ramadhan Sananta	6	1	2+3	0	1	1
11	FW	(Portugal) POR	Miguel Pereira	11	4	10	4	0+1	0
14	FW	(Republic of the Congo) CGO	Yann Mabella	10	2	6+4	2	0	0
16	FW	(Indonesia) IDN	Ricky Pratama	7	0	2+4	0	0+1	0
39	FW	(Brazil) BRA	Alex Martins	9	3	5+4	3	0	0
42	FW	(Indonesia) IDN	Saddil Ramdani	7	0	2+5	0	0	0
77	FW	(Indonesia) IDN	Malik Risaldi	8	0	6+1	0	1	0

Last updated: 13 September 2026.
Source: Soccerway
