= Miguel Pereira =

Miguel Pereira may refer to:

- Miguel Pereira, Rio de Janeiro, a Brazilian municipality
- Miguel Pereira (film director) (born 1957), Argentine filmmaker
- Miguel Pereira (footballer, born 1975), Angolan footballer
- Miguel Pereira (footballer, born 1999), Portuguese footballer
- Miguel Pereira Castillo (born 1947), Puerto Rican politician and public servant
- Miguel Pereira Forjaz (1769-1827), Portuguese general
