= Amesiu United F.C. =

Amesiu United
- Full name: Amesiu United Football Club
- Nickname: Laskar Jangkar Gunung
- Founded: 2018; 8 years ago
- Ground: Amesiu Field; Pondidaha, Konawe
- Coach: H. Amiruddin
- League: Liga 4
| Home colours | Away colours |

Amesiu United Football Club is an Indonesian football club based in Amesiu Village, Pondidaha District, Konawe Regency, Southeast Sulawesi. They currently compete in the Liga 4 Southeast Sulawesi zone.

== Honours ==
- Liga 3 Southeast Sulawesi
  - Runner-up (1): 2021
- Liga 4 Sulawesi Tenggara
  - Runner-up (1): 2025–26
