= EBR United F.C. =

EBR United
- Full name: Energi Bintang Riau United Football Club
- Short name: EBR United
- Founded: 2024; 2 years ago
- Ground: Riau Main Stadium
- Capacity: 43,923
- Owner: PT Energi Bumi Resources
- League: Liga 4
- 2025–26: Runners-up, 2025–26 Liga 4 Riau
- Website: ebr-united.id

Energi Bintang Riau United Football Club, commonly known as EBR United FC or simply EBR United, is an Indonesian football club based in Pekanbaru, Riau. The club primarily focuses on youth football development and grassroots programs through its football academy and youth training system.

EBR United is supported by PT Energi Bumi Resources and aims to develop young football talents in Riau Province. The club participates in regional competitions and youth tournaments at both domestic and international levels.

== History ==
EBR United was established in Pekanbaru as a football academy initiative focused on developing young players through structured grassroots training and youth competitions. The club quickly became active in regional football development programs in Riau and collaborates with several local football schools (Sekolah Sepak Bola or SSB) to strengthen youth football pathways in the province.

In 2025, EBR United represented Indonesia in the youth category at the Malaysia Borneo Football Cup (U-11), an international youth football tournament held in Malaysia.

The club also participated in the 2025–26 Liga 4 Riau regional competition, where EBR United reached the final and finished as runners-up in the RS Awal Bros Liga 4 Riau season.

Besides competing in domestic competitions, EBR United has also been involved in organizing youth football tournaments, including the Tanjak Riau Junior International Cup, which aims to promote youth football development and international exposure for youth players in Riau.

== Youth development ==
EBR United operates a football academy program focused on early-age player development. The club works with grassroots football schools across Riau, including collaborations with local academies such as SSB Bina Mandiri Tembilahan, to expand youth football opportunities in the region.

== Honours ==
Regional competitions

- Liga 4 Riau
  - Runners-up (1): 2025–26
