= Alfan Suaib =

Indonesian footballer

Personal information
- Full name: Alfan Suaib
- Date of birth: 24 March 2004 (age 22)
- Place of birth: Ternate, Indonesia
- Height: 1.73 m (5 ft 8 in)
- Positions: Right-back; winger

Team information
- Current team: Persebaya Surabaya
- Number: 12

Youth career
- –2023: SSB Binter
- 2023–2024: Persebaya Surabaya

Senior career*
Years	Team	Apps	(Gls)
2023–	Persebaya Surabaya	17	(1)
- * Club domestic league appearances and goals as of 25 February 2026

Alfan Suaib (born 24 March 2004) is an Indonesian professional footballer who plays as a right-back for Super League club Persebaya Surabaya.

== International career ==
On 25 November 2024, Alfan received a called-up to the preliminary squad to the Indonesia national team for the 2024 ASEAN Championship.

== Honours ==
Persebaya Surabaya

- Piala Presiden: 2026
