= Syahrul Lasinari =

Indonesian footballer

Personal information
- Full name: Syahrul Ramadhan Lasinari
- Date of birth: 24 December 1999 (age 26)
- Place of birth: Galela, Indonesia
- Height: 1.78 m (5 ft 10 in)
- Position: Defender

Team information
- Current team: Persebaya Surabaya
- Number: 22

Senior career*
Years	Team	Apps	(Gls)
2019	Persekat Tegal		
2020	Persipa Pati	0	(0)
2021	PSG Pati	6	(0)
2022–2024	Persikabo 1973	57	(0)
2024–2026	PSM Makassar	47	(1)
2026–	Persebaya Surabaya	0	(0)
- * Club domestic league appearances and goals as of 18 April 2026

Syahrul Ramadhan Lasinari (born 24 December 1999) is an Indonesian professional footballer who plays as a defender for Super League club Persebaya Surabaya.

== Club career ==
=== PSG Pati ===
In 2021, Syahrul signed a contract with Indonesian Liga 2 club PSG Pati. He made first 2021–22 Liga 2 debut on 26 September 2021, coming on as a starting in a 2–0 lose with Persis Solo at the Manahan Stadium, Surakarta.

=== Persikabo 1973 ===
He was signed for Persikabo 1973 and played in Liga 1 in 2022–2023 season. Syahrul made his league debut on 25 July 2022 in a match against Persebaya Surabaya at the Pakansari Stadium, Cibinong.

== Career statistics ==
=== Club ===
As of 8 February 2026

Club	Season	League			Cup		Continental		Other		Total	
Club	Season	Division	Apps	Goals	Apps	Goals	Apps	Goals	Apps	Goals	Apps	Goals
Persipa Pati	2020	Liga 3	0	0	0	0	–		0	0	0	0
PSG Pati	2021	Liga 2	6	0	0	0	–		0	0	6	0
Persikabo 1973	2022–23	Liga 1	26	0	0	0	–		0	0	26	0
Persikabo 1973	2023–24	Liga 1	31	0	0	0	–		0	0	31	0
PSM Makassar	2024–25	Liga 1	31	1	0	0	–		7 (Note: Appearances in ASEAN Club Championship)	0	38	1
PSM Makassar	2025–26	Super League	15	0	0	0	–		0	0	15	0
Career total			109	1	0	0	0	0	7	0	116	1

== Honours ==
Persebaya Surabaya

- Piala Presiden: 2026
