= Dicky Kurniawan =

Indonesian footballer (born 2002)

Personal information
- Full name: Dicky Kurniawan Arifin
- Date of birth: 6 June 2002 (age 24)
- Place of birth: Surabaya, Indonesia
- Height: 1.65 m (5 ft 5 in)
- Positions: Attacking midfielder; winger

Team information
- Current team: Persebaya Surabaya

Youth career
- 2007–2014: Assyabaab
- 2014–2018: Bintang Timur
- 2018–2021: Persebaya Surabaya

Senior career*
Years	Team	Apps	(Gls)
2021–2023	Persebaya Surabaya	4	(0)
2022	→ Gresik United (loan)	7	(1)
2023–2025	Gresik United	37	(6)
2025–2026	Persijap Jepara	21	(2)
2026–	Persebaya Surabaya	0	(0)
- * Club domestic league appearances and goals as of 23 May 2026

Dicky Kurniawan Arifin (born 6 June 2002) is an Indonesian professional footballer who plays as an attacking midfielder or winger for Super League club Persebaya Surabaya.

== Club career ==
=== Persebaya Surabaya ===
Dicky was signed for Persebaya Surabaya and played in Liga 1 in the 2021 season. He made his first-team debut on 29 January 2022 in a match against PSS Sleman as a substitute for Arsenio Valpoort in the 70th minute at the Kapten I Wayan Dipta Stadium, Gianyar.

== Career statistics ==
=== Club ===
As of 23 May 2026

Club	Season	League			Cup		Continental		Other		Total	
Club	Season	Division	Apps	Goals	Apps	Goals	Apps	Goals	Apps	Goals	Apps	Goals
Persebaya Surabaya	2021–22	Liga 1	4	0	0	0	–		0	0	4	0
Gresik United (loan)	2022–23	Liga 2	7	1	0	0	–		0	0	7	1
Gresik United	2023–24	Liga 2	17	3	0	0	–		0	0	17	3
Gresik United	2024–25	Liga 2	20	3	0	0	–		0	0	20	3
Persijap Jepara	2025–26	Super League	21	2	0	0	–		0	0	21	2
Career total			69	9	0	0	0	0	0	0	69	9

== Honours ==
Persebaya Surabaya

- Piala Presiden: 2026

Individual

- Super League Assist of the Month: March 2026
