= Bernardo Tavares =

Portuguese football manager (born 1980)

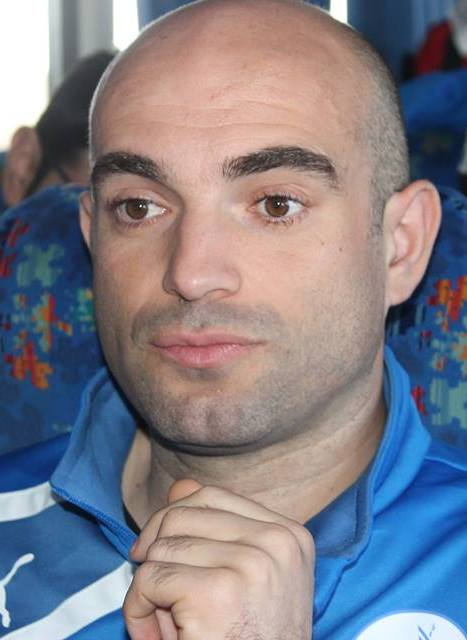
- Tavares in 2013

Personal information
- Full name: Fernando José Bernardo Tavares
- Date of birth: 2 May 1980 (age 46)
- Place of birth: Proença-a-Nova, Portugal
- Height: 1.76 m (5 ft 9 in)
- Position: Defensive midfielder

Team information
- Current team: Persebaya Surabaya (head coach)

Youth career
- 1990–1996: Proença-a-Nova

Senior career*
Years	Team	Apps	(Gls)
1996–2003	Proença-a-Nova		

Managerial career
- 1997–1998: Proença-a-Nova U18
- 1998–1999: Pastelaria Rosa U18
- 1999–2000: Pastelaria Rosa
- 2000–2001: ESDRM
- 2001–2002: Benfica (youth)
- 2002–2005: Alcobaça (assistant)
- 2005–2008: Alcobaça
- 2008: Porto (scout)
- 2008–2009: Sporting CP (youth)
- 2009–2010: Carregado (assistant)
- 2010–2011: Belenenses (assistant)
- 2011–2012: Belenenses
- 2012–2013: Gil Vicente (scout)
- 2013–2014: Al-Hidd (assistant)
- 2014–2015: Tirsense
- 2015: Al-Nahda
- 2016: African Lyon
- 2016–2017: Tourizense
- 2017–2018: New Radiant
- 2018: Benfica de Macau
- 2019–2020: Churchill Brothers
- 2022: HIFK
- 2022–2025: PSM Makassar
- 2025–: Persebaya Surabaya
- * Club domestic league appearances and goals

Fernando José Bernardo Tavares (born 2 May 1980) is a Portuguese football manager and former player. He is currently the head coach of the Indonesia Super League club, Persebaya Surabaya.

== Playing career ==
Tavares began his footballing career when he was 10 years old with the youth team of ADC Proença-a-Nova, based in his hometown, Proença-a-Nova. After joining the senior team in 1996, he spent his entire playing career at ADC Proença-a-Nova and played for the club until he retired in 2003 at 23 years old.

== Managerial career ==
Tavares holds the UEFA Pro Licence, regarded as the highest football coaching qualification in Europe. He received his licence in June 2013 from the Portuguese Football Federation.

=== Proença-a-Nova U18 ===
Tavares began his managerial career with the U-18 team of Proença-a-Nova in 1997.

=== Pastelaria Rosa ===
In 1998, Tavares was appointed as head coach of the U-18 team of Pastelaria Rosa FC. In 1999, he became the head coach of the senior team.

=== Escola Superior de Desporto de Rio Maior (ESDRM) ===
In 2000, Tavares was appointed as the head coach of Escola Superior de Desporto de Rio Maior (ESDRM).

=== Benfica ===
In 2001, Tavares was appointed as the assistant coach of the U-12 team of Benfica.

=== Alcobaça ===
In 2001, Tavares was appointed by Alcobaça to work as the head coach of multiple of Alcobaça's youth teams (U-14, U-15, U-16, and U-18). He then became the assistant coach of the first team between 2002 and 2005. In 2005, he was appointed as the head coach of Alcobaça's first team until 2008. During his time as the head coach, he helped the club win the AFL Cup in 2005–06 and 2006–07.

=== FC Porto (Scout) ===
In 2008, Tavares was appointed by Porto to work as a scout.

=== Sporting CP Youth and Academy ===
In 2008, Tavares was appointed as the head coach of Sporting CP academy and helped them win the 2008–09 Sub-10 International Tournament.

=== Carregado ===
In 2009, Tavares was appointed as the assistant manager of Carregado.

=== Belenenses ===
In 2010, Belenenses appointed Tavares as the assistant coach of José Mota. In 2011, he became the head coach of Belenenses.

=== Gil Vicente (Scout) ===
In 2012, Tavares worked as a scout for Primeira Liga club Gil Vicente

=== Al-Hidd ===
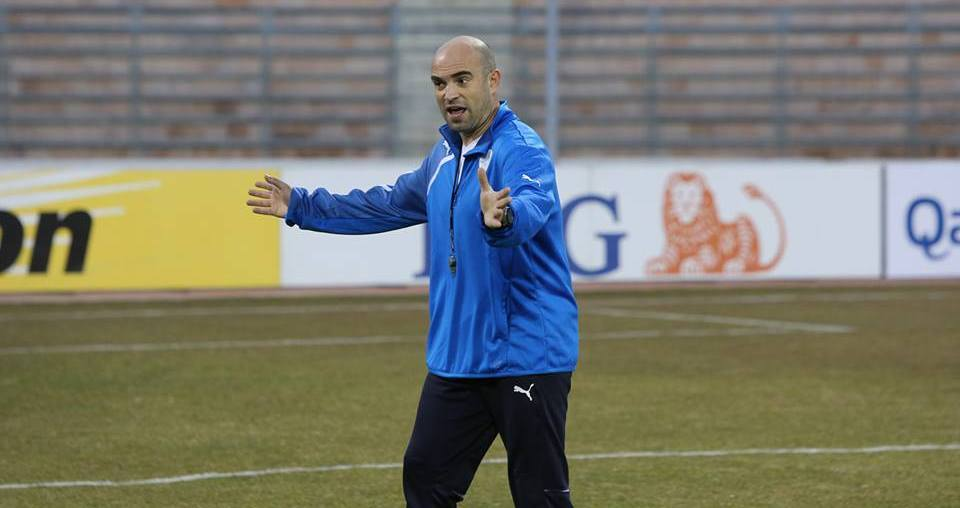
Bernardo Tavares - 2014 AFC Champions League

Tavares first moved away from Portugal in 2013 to Bahrain, where he was appointed by Bahraini Premier League club Al-Hidd as the assistant coach for Adnan Ebrahim Showaiter and Khalifa Al-Zayani. He helped the club secure the 3rd position in the 2013–14 Bahraini Premier League which was the club's best league finish in history. They also had a successful run in the 2014 AFC Champions League where they entered as a qualifying play-off Round 1 participant. In Round 1, the club posted a resounding 3–1 victory over their hosts, 2012–13 Jordan League champions, Shabab Al-Ordon. In Round 2, the Bahraini club were defeated 2–1 by 2012–13 Qatar Stars League runners-up Lekhwiya at the Abdullah bin Khalifa Stadium and hence failed to advance to the group stage. As a result, the club got a direct entry into the 2014 AFC Cup group stage. The club finished second in Group C which included 2013 Kuwait Emir Cup winners, Al-Qadsia (finished as the winners of 2014 AFC Cup), 2012–13 Iraqi Elite League champions Al-Shorta and 2013 Syrian Cup winners, Al-Wahda and hence advanced to the 2014 AFC Cup knock-out stage. In the Round of 16, the club secured a 1–0 win over 2012–13 Lebanese Premier League champions, Al-Safa' and advanced to the quarter-finals. In the Quarter-finals the Bahraini club again met their group mate, Al-Qadsia. In the first leg, the club played a 1–1 draw against hosts and in the second leg the club again played out a draw with the visitors (2-2) but were unlucky as the visitors advanced to the semi-finals on away goals rule. This was the club's best ever performance in an AFC club competitions.

=== Tirsense ===
In 2014, Tavares moved back to Portugal and to be the head coach of Portuguese Second Division club Tirsense.

=== Al-Nahda ===
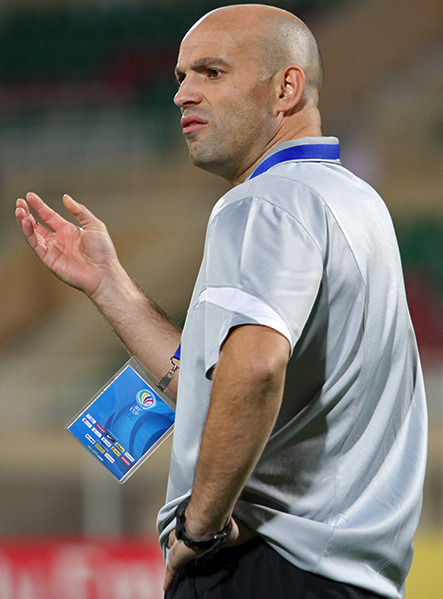
Bernardo Tavares - 2014–15 Oman Professional League

In 2015, Tavares moved back to the Middle East, this time Oman where he was appointed as the head coach of 2013–14 Oman Professional League winners, Al-Nahda. His first match as head in-charge of the club was on 17 February 2015 in a 2–1 win over 2014 GCC Champions League runners-up, Saham. He also made an appearance as the assistant coach of the club in a 2–1 loss against 2013–14 Qatar Stars League runners-up, El Jaish in the preliminary round 2 of 2015 AFC Champions League qualifying play-off and hence failed to advance to the group stage. He was also head in-charge of the club in the 2015 AFC Cup. The club began the campaign on a flying note as they secured a 2–1 win over 2013–14 Syrian Premier League winners, Al-Wahda.

=== African Lyon ===
Tavares moved to Tanzania in Africa in August 2016, where he was appointed by Tanzanian Premier League side, African Lyon He made his debut appearance as a manager in the Tanzanian Premier League on 21 August 2016 in a 1–1 draw against 2015–16 Tanzanian Premier League runners-up, Azam Later due to some financial delays, the Portuguese decided to part ways with the Tanzanian side.

=== New Radiant ===
On 16 January 2017, Tavares was appointed as the head coach of Maldivian side, New Radiant

=== Benfica de Macau ===
On 18 January 2018, Benfica de Macau announced Tavares as their new coach.

=== Churchill Brothers ===
In November 2019, Churchill Brothers announced Tavares as their new head coach.

=== HIFK ===
On 21 December 2021, Tavares became the coach of Finnish club HIFK. He left the club early in the season in April 2022 for "family reasons". However, shortly after he was named the head coach of PSM Makassar. Mika Lönnström, the sporting director of HIFK, commented later that they tend to trust people, when he was asked if Tavares had fooled the club.

=== PSM Makassar ===
In 2022, Tavares was appointed as head coach of Indonesian club PSM Makassar. He led the team to win the 2022–23 Liga 1 season.

On 1 October 2025, Tavares resigned due to the lack of salary payment for months.

=== Persebaya Surabaya ===
On 23 December 2025, Persebaya Surabaya officially announced the appointment of Bernardo Tavares as the club’s new head coach for the remainder of the 2025–26 Super League season. The announcement was made through the club’s official channels, and Tavares expressed his appreciation for the professionalism shown by the club throughout the negotiation process.

== Other roles ==
Tavares has had many other jobs in his footballing career. In 2002, he started working as the head coach and technical director of Escolinha de Futebol do Bernardo where he worked until 2013, despite holding other jobs during this time period. From 2002 to 2004, he worked as the Youth Football coordinator of G.C. Alcobaça. He also worked as the Futsal coordinator of ADC Proença-a-Nova from 2006 to 2009. In 2009–2010, he coordinated goalkeeper training at A.D. Carregado. From 2010 to 2012, he worked as the coordinator of the Department of Professional Football Scouting at C.F. Os Belenenses.

=== Training reporter ===
Tavares also had the job of making training reports for several European clubs. He first enrolled in this job in 2001 when he worked with Primeira Liga club U.D. Leiria under head coach, José Mourinho. He also worked with La Liga club Real Madrid C.F. in 2004 under head coach, Carlos Queiroz. In 2008, he worked with Sporting CP under head coach, Paulo Bento and in 2014 he worked with F.C. Paços de Ferreira under head coach, Paulo Fonseca.

== Managerial statistics ==
As of match played 7 November 2026

Managerial record by team and tenure
Team	Nat.	From	To	Record					Ref.
Team	Nat.	From	To	G	W	D	L	Win %	Ref.
Tirsense	(Portugal)	1 July 2014	10 November 2014	1	0	0	1	0.00	
Benfica Macau	(Macau)	18 January 2018	31 August 2018	6	4	0	2	66.67	
Churchill Brothers	(India)	28 November 2019	10 March 2020	15	6	2	7	40.00	
Helsinki IFK	(Finland)	1 January 2022	5 April 2022	5	2	0	3	40.00	
PSM Makassar	(Indonesia)	10 April 2022	1 October 2025	132	57	45	30	43.18	
Persebaya Surabaya	(Indonesia)	22 December 2025	Present	28	13	7	8	46.43	
Career Total				187	82	54	51	43.85	

== Honorable mentions ==
In 2006, Tavares received praise for having won two AFL Cups as the head coach of G.C. Alcobaça.

He has received an award of distinction for graduating from Escola Superior de Desporto de Rio Maior.

== Honours ==
=== Player ===
Proença-a-Nova

- Castelo Branco Football Association Cup Runners-up: 1999–2000

=== Manager ===
Alcobaça

- AFL Cup: 2005–06, 2006–07

Sporting CP academy

- Sub-10 International Tournament: 2008–09

PSM Makassar

- Liga 1: 2022–23

Persebaya Surabaya

- Piala Presiden: 2026

WON 8 TROPHIES

- 1 Premier League Macao (China)
- 1 Super Cup "Bolinha" Hong Kong/Macao
- 1 Premier League in Maldives
- 1 President's Cup in Maldives
- 1 FA Cup in Maldives
- 2 AFL Cups in Portugal
- 1 Youth League in Portugal

=== Individual ===
- Liga 1/Super League Coach of the Month: August 2022, September 2022, February 2023, January 2026
- Liga 1 Best Coach: 2022–23
