= Reza Arya Pratama =

Indonesian footballer

Reza Arya
Personal information
- Full name: Muhammad Reza Arya Pratama
- Date of birth: 18 May 2000 (age 26)
- Place of birth: Parepare, Indonesia
- Height: 1.85 m (6 ft 1 in)
- Position: Goalkeeper

Team information
- Current team: Persebaya Surabaya
- Number: 30

Youth career
- PPLP Sulawesi Selatan
- 2016: Mattombong FC
- 2017–2019: PSM Makassar

Senior career*
Years	Team	Apps	(Gls)
2019–2026	PSM Makassar	92	(0)
2026–	Persebaya Surabaya	0	(0)
- * Club domestic league appearances and goals as of 23 May 2026

Muhammad Reza Arya Pratama (born 18 May 2000) is an Indonesian professional footballer who plays as a goalkeeper for Super League club Persebaya Surabaya.

== Club career ==
=== PSM Makassar ===
Reza was part of the PSM Makassar youth team from 2017 to 2019, earning a spot on the senior team ahead of the 2019 Liga 1 season.

Reza made his league debut on 23 July 2022 against PSS Sleman. Six days later, he kept his first clean sheet in a 2–0 victory over Bali United.

== International career ==
On 27 May 2023, Reza received his first ever call-up to the Indonesian national team for the friendly matches against Palestine and Argentina.

On 29 August 2023, Reza got called up for a friendly match against Turkmenistan.

== Career statistics ==
=== Club ===
As of 23 May 2026

Club	Season	League			Cup		Continental		Other		Total	
Club	Season	Division	Apps	Goals	Apps	Goals	Apps	Goals	Apps	Goals	Apps	Goals
PSM Makassar	2019	Liga 1	2	0	0	0	0	0	0	0	2	0
PSM Makassar	2020	Liga 1	0	0	0	0	–		0	0	0	0
PSM Makassar	2021–22	Liga 1	1	0	0	0	–		0	0	1	0
PSM Makassar	2022–23	Liga 1	33	0	0	0	4 (Note: Appearances in AFC Cup)	0	4 (Note: Appearances in Indonesia President's Cup)	0	41	0
PSM Makassar	2023–24	Liga 1	29	0	0	0	3	0	0	0	32	0
PSM Makassar	2024–25	Liga 1	17	0	0	0	–		5 (Note: Appearances in ASEAN Club Championship)	0	22	0
PSM Makassar	2025–26	Super League	10	0	0	0	–		0	0	10	0
Career total			92	0	0	0	7	0	9	0	108	0

== Honours ==
PSM Makassar

- Liga 1: 2022–23
- Piala Indonesia: 2018–19

Persebaya Surabaya

- Piala Presiden: 2026

=== Individual ===
- APPI Indonesian Football Award Best Goalkepper: 2022–23
- APPI Indonesian Football Award Best 11: 2022–23
- Liga 1/Super League Save of the Month: February 2025, February 2026
