= Ricky Pratama =

Indonesian footballer

Personal information
- Full name: Ricky Pratama
- Date of birth: 6 May 2003 (age 23)
- Place of birth: Sidoarjo, Indonesia
- Height: 1.75 m (5 ft 9 in)
- Position: Forward

Team information
- Current team: Persebaya Surabaya
- Number: 16

Youth career
- 2019–2021: PSM Makassar

Senior career*
| Years | Team | Apps | (Gls) |
| 2022–2026 | PSM Makassar | 77 | (1) |
| 2026– | Persebaya Surabaya | 1 | (0) |

International career^{‡}
| 2022 | Indonesia U20 | 2 | (0) |
| 2025 | Indonesia U23 | 6 | (0) |
- * Club domestic league appearances and goals as of 5 September 2026 ‡ National team caps and goals as of 18 November 2025

Ricky Pratama (born 6 May 2003) is an Indonesian professional footballer who plays as a forward for Super League club Persebaya Surabaya.

== Club career ==
=== PSM Makassar ===
He was signed for PSM Makassar to play in Liga 1 in the 2022 season. Ricky made his league debut on 10 September 2022 in a match against Persebaya Surabaya at the Gelora B.J. Habibie Stadium, Parepare.

== International career ==
On 2 June 2022, Ricky made his debut for an Indonesian youth team U-20 against a Ghana U-20 squad in the 2022 Maurice Revello Tournament in France. In October 2022, it was reported that Ricky received a call-up from the Indonesia U-20 for a training camp, in Turkey and Spain.

== Career statistics ==
=== Club ===
As of 5 September 2026

| Club | Season | League | | | Cup | | Continental | | Other | | Total | |
| Club | Season | Division | Apps | Goals | Apps | Goals | Apps | Goals | Apps | Goals | Apps | Goals |
|---|---|---|---|---|---|---|---|---|---|---|---|---|
| PSM Makassar | 2022–23 | Liga 1 | 14 | 0 | 0 | 0 | 1 (Note: Appearances in AFC Cup) | 0 | 0 | 0 | 15 | 0 |
| PSM Makassar | 2023–24 | Liga 1 | 20 | 1 | 0 | 0 | 1 | 0 | 0 | 0 | 21 | 1 |
| PSM Makassar | 2024–25 | Liga 1 | 31 | 0 | 0 | 0 | – | | 7 (Note: Appearances in ASEAN Club Championship) | 0 | 38 | 0 |
| PSM Makassar | 2025–26 | Super League | 12 | 0 | 0 | 0 | – | | 0 | 0 | 12 | 0 |
| Persebaya Surabaya | 2026–27 | Super League | 1 | 0 | 0 | 0 | 0 | 0 | 0 | 0 | 1 | 0 |
| Career total | | | 78 | 1 | 0 | 0 | 2 | 0 | 7 | 0 | 87 | 1 |

== Honours ==
=== Club ===
PSM Makassar

- Liga 1: 2022–23

Persebaya Surabaya

- Piala Presiden: 2026

=== Individual ===
- Liga 1 U-18 Top Goalscorer: 2021 (27 goals)
