= Yusuf Meilana =

Indonesian footballer

Personal information
- Full name: Yusuf Meilana Fuad Burhani
- Date of birth: 4 May 1998 (age 28)
- Place of birth: Kediri, Indonesia
- Height: 1.76 m (5 ft 9 in)
- Position: Left-back

Team information
- Current team: Persebaya Surabaya
- Number: 31

Youth career
- 2015–2016: Persedikab Kediri
- 2016: Persekat Tegal

Senior career*
Years	Team	Apps	(Gls)
2017–2026	Persik Kediri	133	(2)
2018	→ Persekat Tegal (loan)	8	(0)
2026	→ Bali United (loan)	6	(0)
2026–	Persebaya Surabaya	0	(0)
- * Club domestic league appearances and goals as of 22 May 2026

Yusuf Meilana Fuad Burhani (born 4 May 1998) is an Indonesian professional footballer who plays as a left-back for Super League club Persebaya Surabaya.

== Club career ==
=== Persik Kediri ===
In 2017 Yusuf Meilana joined Persik Kediri in the Liga 2. On 25 November 2019 Persik successfully won the 2019 Liga 2 Final and promoted to Liga 1, after defeated Persita Tangerang 3–2 at the Kapten I Wayan Dipta Stadium, Gianyar.

==== Persekat Tegal (loan) ====
He was signed for Persekat Tegal to play in Liga 3 Regional route: Central Java in the 2018 season, on loan from Persik Kediri.

== Honours ==
Persik Kediri

- Liga 2: 2019
- Liga 3: 2018

Persebaya Surabaya

- Piala Presiden: 2026
