= Gledson Paixão =

Brazilian footballer (born 1995)

Personal information
- Full name: Gledson Paixão da Silva
- Date of birth: 18 May 1995 (age 31)
- Place of birth: Santo Amaro, Brazil
- Height: 1.85 m (6 ft 1 in)
- Position: Defensive midfielder

Team information
- Current team: Persebaya Surabaya
- Number: 40

Youth career
- 2015–2017: Atibaia

Senior career*
Years	Team	Apps	(Gls)
2018–2020	Atibaia	12	(0)
2019	→ Vila Nova (loan)	6	(0)
2019	→ Boa (loan)	0	(0)
2021	Santo André	13	(0)
2021–2022	Esportivo Juventus	16	(0)
2022–2023	Pouso Alegre	22	(2)
2023	Joinville	10	(0)
2023–2024	Figueirense	27	(0)
2025	Retrô	13	(0)
2025–2026	PSM Makassar	22	(1)
2026–	Persebaya Surabaya	1	(0)
- * Club domestic league appearances and goals as of 5 September 2026

Gledson Paixão da Silva (born 18 May 1995), is a Brazilian professional footballer who plays as a defensive midfielder for Super League club Persebaya Surabaya.

== Club career ==
Born in Santo Amaro, São Paulo, Brazil, Gledson spent his early career in Brazil at a young age with Atibaia. In 2019, he signed for Vila Nova on loan.

In April 2022, Gledson signed a contract with Pouso Alegre. He made his league debut on 17 April 2022 in a match against Real Noroeste, coming as a starter and played full 90 minutes. On 30 July 2022, Gledson scored his first league for the club in a 2–0 win against Operário-VG. The following year, he signed with Joinville. He made his Joinville debut on 14 January 2023 in a 0–0 draw with Camboriú in the 2023 Campeonato Catarinense.

In April 2023, Gledson signed a year contract with Figueirense. He made his debut for the club on 5 May 2023, coming on as starter in a 0–0 2023 Campeonato Brasileiro Série C away draw against Altos.

On 31 August 2025, Gledson moved to Indonesian Super League club PSM Makassar.

== Honours ==
Persebaya Surabaya

- Piala Presiden: 2026
