= 2025–26 Liga 4 Southeast Sulawesi =

Liga 4 Southeast Sulawesi
- Season: 2025–26
- Dates: 27 January – 17 February 2026
- Champions: Unaaha (1st title)
- National phase: Unaaha

The 2025–26 Liga 4 Southeast Sulawesi will be the second season of Liga 4 Southeast Sulawesi after the change in the structure of Indonesian football competition and serves as a qualifying round for the national phase of the 2025–26 Liga 4.

The competition is organised by the Southeast Sulawesi Provincial PSSI Association.

== Teams ==
A total of 14 teams are competing in this season.

No	Team	Location	2024–25 season
Mainland zone
1	Amesiu United	Konawe Regency	—
2	ERPA	Konawe Regency	—
3	PS Padangguni	Konawe Regency	—
4	Unaaha	Konawe Regency	—
5	Phoenix	Kolaka Regency	—
6	Kijang Pantai	South Konawe Regency	—
7	UHO MZF	Kendari City	Champions
Islands zone
8	PSW Wolio	Baubau City	—
9	Buton Sakti	Buton Regency	—
10	Buteng United	Central Buton Regency	—
11	Gulamastar	Central Buton Regency	—
12	Parigi Raya	Muna Regency	—
13	PS Muna Barat	West Muna Regency	—
14	PS Satria Wakumoro	West Muna Regency	—

== Mainland zone ==
A total of 6 teams will be drawn into two groups of three. The group stage will be played in a home tournament format of single round-robin matches.

The top two teams of each group will qualify for the knockout stage.

=== First stage ===
==== Group A ====
Pos	Team	Pld	W	D	L	GF	GA	GD	Pts	Qualification	C	A	B
1	Amesiu United	4	3	1	0	11	3	+8	10	Qualification to the Knockout stage	—		
2	Unaaha	4	2	1	1	8	5	+3	7	Qualification to the Knockout stage		—	
3	Phoenix	4	0	0	4	1	12	−11	0				—

Source: Liga 4 Sulawesi Tenggara
Rules for classification: 1) Points; 2) Head-to-head points; 3) Head-to-head goal difference; 4) Head-to-head goals scored; 5) Goal difference; 6) Goals scored; 7) Fair-play points; 8) Draw.

==== Group B ====
Pos	Team	Pld	W	D	L	GF	GA	GD	Pts	Qualification	A	C	B
1	UHO MZF	4	3	1	0	27	2	+25	10	Qualification to the Knockout stage	—		
2	Kijang Pantai	4	2	1	1	9	9	0	7	Qualification to the Knockout stage		—	
3	PS Padangguni	4	0	0	4	6	31	−25	0				—

Source: Liga 4 Southeast Sulawesi
Rules for classification: 1) Points; 2) Head-to-head points; 3) Head-to-head goal difference; 4) Head-to-head goals scored; 5) Goal difference; 6) Goals scored; 7) Fair-play points; 8) Draw.

=== Second stage ===
==== Group C ====
Pos	Team	Pld	W	D	L	GF	GA	GD	Pts	Qualification	D	A	B	C
1	Unaaha	3	2	1	0	10	1	+9	7	Qualification to the Knockout stage	—			
2	Amesiu United	3	1	2	0	18	3	+15	5	Qualification to the Knockout stage		—		
3	Kijang Pantai	3	1	0	2	4	24	−20	3				—	
4	UHO MZF	3	0	1	2	1	5	−4	1					—

Rules for classification: 1) Points; 2) Head-to-head points; 3) Head-to-head goal difference; 4) Head-to-head goals scored; 5) Goal difference; 6) Goals scored; 7) Fair-play points; 8) Draw.

=== Final ===
Team 1	Agg.	Team 2	1st leg	2nd leg
Unaaha	6–1	Amesiu United	3–1	3–0

== Islands zone ==
=== First stage ===
==== Group A ====
Pos	Team	Pld	W	D	L	GF	GA	GD	Pts	Qualification	A	D	B	C
1	Parigi Raya (H)	3	2	1	0	18	1	+17	7	Qualification to the Knockout stage	—			
2	Buteng United	3	2	1	0	14	3	+11	7	Qualification to the Knockout stage		—		
3	Gulamastar	3	0	1	2	5	13	−8	1				—	
4	Buton Sakti	3	0	1	2	3	23	−20	1					—

Source: Liga 4 Southeast Sulawesi
Rules for classification: 1) Points; 2) Head-to-head points; 3) Head-to-head goal difference; 4) Head-to-head goals scored; 5) Goal difference; 6) Goals scored; 7) Fair-play points; 8) Draw.
(H) Hosts

==== Group B ====
Pos	Team	Pld	W	D	L	GF	GA	GD	Pts	Qualification	C	A	B
1	PS Muna Barat	4	2	2	0	12	4	+8	8	Qualification to the Knockout stage	—		
2	PS Satria Wakumoro	4	2	2	0	9	4	+5	8	Qualification to the Knockout stage		—	
3	PSW Wolio	4	0	0	4	1	14	−13	0				—

Source: Liga 4 Southeast Sulawesi
Rules for classification: 1) Points; 2) Head-to-head points; 3) Head-to-head goal difference; 4) Head-to-head goals scored; 5) Goal difference; 6) Goals scored; 7) Fair-play points; 8) Draw.

=== Second stage ===
==== Group C ====
Pos	Team	Pld	W	D	L	GF	GA	GD	Pts	Qualification	B	A	C	D
1	PS Muna Barat	3	2	0	1	4	1	+3	6	Qualification to the Knockout stage	—			
2	Parigi Raya	3	2	0	1	4	5	−1	6	Qualification to the Knockout stage		—		
3	PS Satria Wakumoro	3	1	0	2	3	3	0	3				—	
4	Buteng United	3	1	0	2	4	6	−2	3					—

Rules for classification: 1) Points; 2) Head-to-head points; 3) Head-to-head goal difference; 4) Head-to-head goals scored; 5) Goal difference; 6) Goals scored; 7) Fair-play points; 8) Draw.

=== Final ===
Team 1	Agg.	Team 2	1st leg	2nd leg
PS Muna Barat	2–0	Parigi Raya	1–0	1–0

== Knockout round ==
The knockout round will be played as a single match. If tied after regulation time, extra time and, if necessary, a penalty shoot-out will be used to decide the winning team.

=== Bracket ===
Semi-finals
16 February 2026
Unaaha	9
Parigi Raya	0
17 February 2026
PS Muna Barat	2
Amesiu United	3

Final
17 February 2026
Unaaha	1
Amesiu United	0

== See also ==
- 2025–26 Liga 4
