= Persebaya Surabaya =

Association football team in Indonesia

- Full name: Persatuan Sepakbola Surabaya
- Nicknames: Bajul Ijo (The Green Crocodiles); Green Force; Bonek (supporters)
- Founded: 18 June 1927; 99 years ago as Soerabajasche Indonesische Voetbal Bond (SIVB); 18 May 1938; 88 years ago, as Persatoean Sepakraga Indonesia Soerabaja (Persibaja) then Persebaya
- Ground: Gelora Bung Tomo Stadium
- Capacity: 46,806
- Owners: Koperasi Surya Abadi Persebaya (30%); PT DBL Indonesia (70%)
- CEO: Azrul Ananda
- Coach: Bernardo Tavares
- League: Super League
- 2025–26: 4th of 18
- Website: www.persebaya.id
| Home colours | Away colours |

Persatuan Sepakbola Surabaya (lit. 'Football Association of Surabaya'), commonly known as Persebaya Surabaya or simply Persebaya (Indonesian pronunciation: [ˈpersɛbaja]), is an Indonesian professional football club based in Surabaya, East Java. The club currently plays in the Super League, the top league of Indonesian football. Persebaya Surabaya is regarded as one of the most iconic and successful teams in the country, winning numerous Indonesian League titles and tournaments.

Persebaya temporarily changed its name to Persebaya 1927 as a result of the Persebaya Surabaya dualism conflict, which lasted from 2010 to 2017 and led to the suspension of Persebaya's membership in the Football Association of Indonesia (PSSI). Following the resolution of the dualism dispute, Persebaya's membership in PSSI was reinstated at the association's annual congress held in Bandung on 8 January 2017.

== History ==
=== Foundation and name change ===
Persebaya was founded by M Pamoedji and Paidjo on 18 June 1927 in Surabaya, under the original name Soerabajasche Indonesische Voetbal Bond (SIVB). Pamoedji, who also served as the Resident of Surabaya, established the club to provide indigenous football players with an opportunity to challenge the dominance of the Soerabajasche Voetbal Bond (SVB), a football association founded in 1901 whose owners and players were Dutch individuals residing in Surabaya at the time.

In 1938, during the club's annual meeting, SIVB changed its name to Persatoean Sepakraga Indonesia Soerabaja (Persibaja; pronounced Persibaya), an Indonesian translation of its former Dutch-language name, following an appeal by the PSSI for its member clubs to adopt Indonesian-language names. The club later adopted the name Persatuan Sepakbola Surabaya (Persebaya) in 1960s, with the word "Indonesia" removed as it was no longer considered necessary following Indonesian independence in 1945, as the club was already recognized as a Surabaya-based member of the PSSI.

=== Perserikatan era (1931–1994) ===
On April 19, 1930, M. Pamoedji, representing Soerabajasche Indonesische Voetbal Bond (SIVB), attended a meeting of officials from football clubs across the Dutch East Indies, held at the Societeit Hadiprojo in Yogyakarta (now known as Wisma Soeratin). Among the club representatives present were those from Voetbalbond Indonesische Jacatra (VIJ), Bandoeng Inlandsche Voetbal Bond (BIVB), Indonesische Voetbal Bond Magelang (IVBM), Madioensche Voetbal Bond (MVB), Vorstenlandsche Voetbal Bond (VVB), and PSIM Yogyakarta. During this meeting, the establishment of a football governing body named Persatoean Sepakraga Seloeroeh Indonesia (Football Association of Indonesia or PSSI) was declared. Later, at a PSSI congress held in Surakarta in 1950, the name was changed to Persatuan Sepak bola Seluruh Indonesia (PSSI).

In 1931, a year after the establishment of PSSI, the inaugural Indonesian inter-city association football championship, known as the Inlandsche Stedenwedstrijden (later Perserikatan), was held. After participating in several editions, SIVB was renamed Persibaja during the 1938 PSSI Stedenwedstrijden and reached the final round held in Surakarta, featuring several Tionghoa players who had previously played for Tiong Hoa Soerabaja. However, Persibaja finished as runners-up after losing to VIJ Jakarta. The presence of Tionghoa players at Persebaya continued until the 1970s.

Team of "Persebaya" that won their first Perserikatan title in 1951 PSSI National Championship. (Photo source: Merdeka)

In the 1941 PSSI Stedenwedstrijden competition, Persibaja once again failed to win the title, finishing as runners-up for the second time after losing to Persis Solo in the final round held in Bandung. After finishing as runners-up on two previous occasions, Persebaya won their first Perserikatan title in the 1951 PSSI National Championship, finishing top of the final-round standings ahead of runners-up PSM Makassar, and a year later they successfully defended their title in the 1952 PSSI National Championship, defeating Persija Jakarta 2–1 in their last match of the final-round held in Surabaya. After winning back-to-back Perserikatan titles in 1951 and 1952, Persebaya finished as runners-up in the 1964–65, 1971, and 1973 editions, before claiming their third championship in the 1978 PSSI National Championship. They defeated Persija Jakarta 4–3 in the final at Senayan Stadium in Jakarta.

Persebaya won their fourth Perserikatan title in the 1987–88 PSSI Premier Division season, following another runners-up finish in 1986–87, when they were defeated by PSIS Semarang in the final. The 1987–88 campaign was marked by the controversial "elephant football" incident. The incident was reportedly motivated by Persebaya's desire for revenge against PSIS Semarang. Seeking to prevent PSIS from advancing to the next round, Persebaya fielded several inexperienced reserve and youth players against Persipura Jayapura on 21 February 1988. Persebaya subsequently lost 0–12 at Gelora 10 November Stadium in Surabaya, allowing Persipura to overtake PSIS in the Eastern Group standings. Persebaya eventually secured the championship by defeating Persija Jakarta 3–2 after extra time in the final at Senayan Stadium in Jakarta.

=== Liga Indonesia era ===
In 1994, the two football competitions in Indonesia, Perserikatan and Galatama, were merged into a single competition. The newly established competition, known as the Liga Indonesia Premier Division (Divisi Utama Liga Indonesia), was divided into two regional groups: West and East. In the inaugural 1994–95 season of the Liga Indonesia Premier Division, Persebaya competed in the Eastern Division and finished ninth in the standings.

During the 2002 Liga Indonesia Premier Division season, Persebaya were relegated to the Liga Indonesia First Division after finishing 11th in the Eastern Division standings. However, the club spent only one season in the First Division before securing promotion back to the Premier Division as champions of the 2003 season.

Persebaya Surabaya squad during their championship 2004 Liga Indonesia Premier Division

In the 2009-10 season, Persebaya began competing in Indonesia Super League, but ended the season relegated after a "walkover" (WO) loss to Persik Kediri. The club subsequently joined the breakaway Indonesian Premier League, with Assistant Manager Cholid Goromah claiming that the decision was driven by a desire for significant changes in Indonesian football, and denying that it was due to relegation or a lack of regional government funding (APBD). This would lead to a seven-year dispute (called dualisme in Indonesian, to go along with a league-wide issue during the same timeframe) in which there appeared to be two teams both named "Persebaya" in the then-coexisting leagues. Although the original Persebaya did not compete in the reunified Indonesia Super League in 2014 or 2015 (nor the temporary Indonesia Soccer Championship in 2016), the dispute was then resolved when the "rebel" club, which competed in those years, eventually became Bhayangkara F.C. in 2016 after several court rulings were issued disallowing the use of the "Persebaya" and "Bonek" names by the "rebel" club.

In the 2017 season, Persebaya Surabaya won the Liga 2, defeating PSMS Medan in the final which was held at Gelora Bandung Lautan Api Stadium.

In 2019, Persebaya competed in the pre-season tournament President's Cup. They managed to reach the final stage and lost in the Super East Java Derby against Arema, aggregately 2–4.

In October 2019, Persebaya appointed their legend Aji Santoso as new coach, replacing Wolfgang Pikal. Under his management, the club finished 5th in 2021–22 season.

== Team image ==
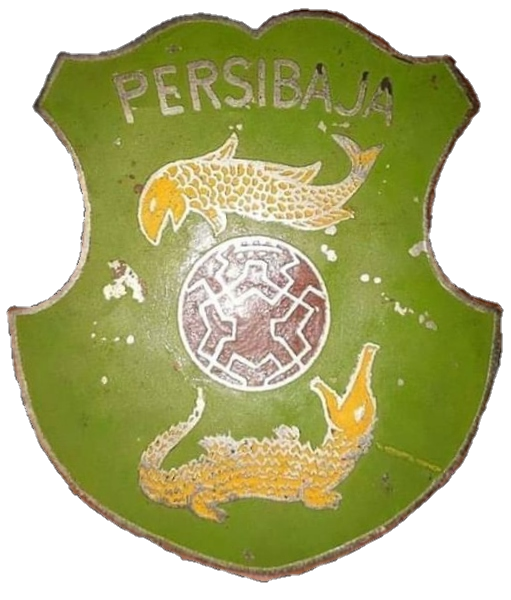
A pin featuring the Persibaja logo, 1950.

=== Crest and colours ===
From the foundation of the club, the common home official kit includes a green shirt, green shorts, with yellow combinations. Green and yellow colours are also seen in the crest. The away kit of the club is associated with a yellow background. Green and yellow have become the club's official Persebaya Surabaya colors.

=== Supporters ===
The supporters of Persebaya are known as Bonek, this an acronym from Bondho (resource) and Nekat (reckless). Bonek is one of the biggest supporter groups in Indonesia. also Persebaya supporters they called as Green Force which mean The Green-Green Troops are synonymous with Persebaya.

The song "Song for Pride", is an anthem song Persebaya Surabaya, this song was composed by Mahardika Nurdian Syahputra.

=== Friendship ===
Bonek has a good relationship with The Jakmania, Supporters of Persija Jakarta. Their friendship began with fans who often made headlines as supporters of the rioters.

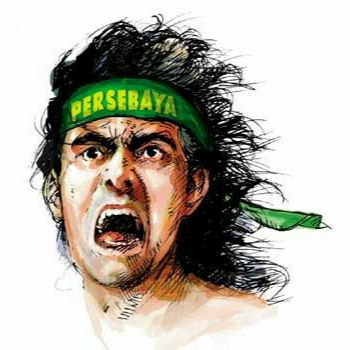
Bonek logo

=== Rivalries ===
The main rivalry with Arema F.C. is known as the Super East Java derby. This match was born from the hostility of the fans and a desire to prove the best in East Java. The Indonesian National Police has regularly attempted to separate both Arema and Persebaya fans from derby matches because of the possibility of clashes between their supporter groups.

A side rivalry with PSIS Semarang was born from a match fixing controversy during the 1988 Perserikatan season, which gave birth to the term sepak bola gajah (lit. 'elephant football') as national colloquial for match fixing in Indonesian football, well before the 1998 AFF Championship controversy.

Persebaya also has another rival with PSMS Medan, Persija Jakarta, PSM Makassar, Persib Bandung in the Perserikatan era.

== Kit suppliers and shirt sponsors ==
=== Sponsorship ===
The main sponsorship list is as follows.

- Kapal Api (mulai emosi jiwa)
- Indomie
- Antangin
- Citicon
- MPM Honda Jatim
- Kencana
- Azawear
- Nusaboard

== Stadium ==
Persebaya plays their home matches at Gelora Bung Tomo Stadium, which replaced the older Gelora 10 November Stadium. English side Queens Park Rangers played a friendly match against Persebaya on 23 July 2012 in Gelora Bung Tomo. The visitors won the match, 2–1.

== Players ==
=== Current squad ===
As of 04 November 2026

Note: Flags indicate national team as defined under FIFA eligibility rules; some limited exceptions apply. Players may hold more than one non-FIFA nationality.

| No. | Pos. | Nation | Player |
|---|---|---|---|
| 1 | GK | IDN | Ilham Al-Arif |
| 2 | DF | IDN | Arief Catur |
| 4 | DF | CPV | Yuran Fernandes |
| 5 | DF | MKD | Risto Mitrevski |
| 7 | MF | MEX | Francisco Rivera (captain) |
| 9 | FW | IDN | Ramadhan Sananta |
| 10 | FW | BRA | Matheus Lagoa |
| 11 | FW | POR | Miguel Pereira |
| 12 | DF | IDN | Alfan Suaib |
| 13 | FW | IDN | Dimas Adi Prasetyo |
| 14 | FW | CGO | Yann Mabella |
| 15 | DF | IDN | Mikael Tata |
| 16 | FW | IDN | Ricky Pratama |
| 17 | DF | BRA | Jefferson |
| 18 | DF | IDN | Randy May |
| 20 | MF | POR | Diogo Ramalho |
| 21 | GK | IDN | Ernando Ari (vice-captain) |
| 22 | DF | IDN | Syahrul Lasinari |

| No. | Pos. | Nation | Player |
|---|---|---|---|
| 24 | GK | IDN | Lutfi Masrohan |
| 27 | GK | IDN | Kenzo Albar |
| 30 | GK | IDN | Reza Arya Pratama |
| 31 | DF | IDN | Yusuf Meilana |
| 33 | DF | IDN | Koko Ari |
| 34 | DF | BRA | Wálber |
| 39 | FW | BRA | Alex Martins |
| 40 | MF | BRA | Gledson Paixão |
| 42 | FW | IDN | Saddil Ramdani (on loan from Persib) |
| 45 | MF | IDN | Dava Yunna Adi Putra |
| 53 | MF | IDN | Rachmat Irianto |
| 55 | MF | IDN | Sadida Nugraha |
| 66 | MF | IDN | Dicky Kurniawan |
| 68 | MF | IDN | Toni Firmansyah |
| 72 | MF | IDN | Aleandro Alan |
| 77 | FW | IDN | Malik Risaldi |
| 81 | MF | IDN | Ichsas Baihaqi |

=== Out on loan ===
Note: Flags indicate national team as defined under FIFA eligibility rules; some limited exceptions apply. Players may hold more than one non-FIFA nationality.

| No. | Pos. | Nation | Player |
|---|---|---|---|
| — | MF | TLS | Gali Freitas (at Madura United) |
| — | DF | IDN | Ahmad Mujtaba (at Persiba Balikpapan) |
| — | MF | IDN | Ilham Romadhona (at Persiba Balikpapan) |

== Management and staff ==
=== Corporate hierarchy ===
| Position | Name |
|---|---|
| Manager | (Indonesia) Sidiq Maulana Tualeka |
| Operationals Director | (Indonesia) Puji Agus |
| Sponsorship Director | (Indonesia) Lucia Cicilia |
| Technical Director | (Indonesia) Uston Nawawi |
| Academy Director | (Argentina) Robertino Pugliara |
| Future Lab Director | (Indonesia) Ganesha Putra |
| Secretary | (Indonesia) Ram Surahman |
| Cooperative Director | (Indonesia) Maurits Pangkay |
| Cooperative Supervisor | (Indonesia) Hayadi |
| Cooperative Treasurer | (Indonesia) Ali Smid |
| Cooperative Secretary | (Indonesia) Anjar |

=== Coaching staff ===
| Position | Name |
|---|---|
| Head coach | (Portugal) Bernardo Tavares |
| Assistant coach | (Portugal) Paulo Renato (Indonesia) Uston Nawawi |
| Goalkeeping coach | (Brazil) Felipe Americo Martins |
| Fitness coach | (Portugal) Diogo de Carvalho (Indonesia) Andri Suyoko |
| Team Analyst | (Portugal) José Filipe Carvalho dos Santos |
| Team Doctor | (Indonesia) Ahmad Ridhoi |
| Team Physiotherapist | (Brazil) Cadu Nunes |
| Under-20's Head coach | (Indonesia) Sony Setiawan |
| Under-18's Head coach | (Indonesia) Mat Halil |
| Under-16's Head coach | (Indonesia) Khabib Syukron |
| Under-13's Head coach | (Indonesia) Dani Cantona |

=== Staff ===
| Position | Name |
|---|---|
| General Affair | (Indonesia) Danang Bekti |
| Kit & Equipment Manager | (Indonesia) Sutrisno Beny |
| Kit & Equipment Assistant | (Indonesia) Djoko Sulistyo (Indonesia) Basori |
| Operational Equipment | (Indonesia) Rio Wicaksono |
| Masseur | (Indonesia) Yok Sebastian |

=== Head coach history ===
Head coach by years (1987–present)

| Name | From | To |
|---|---|---|
| (Indonesia) Rusdy Bahalwan | 1987 | 1993 |
| (Indonesia) Mudayat | 1993 | 1995 |
| (Bulgaria) Aleksandar Kostov | 1995 | 1996 |
| (Indonesia) Rusdy Bahalwan | 1996 | 1999 |
| (Indonesia) Riono Asnan | 1999 | 1999 |
| (Brazil) Jacksen F. Tiago | 1999 | 2000 |
| (Indonesia) Rudy Keltjes | 2000 | 2001 |
| (Indonesia) Rusdy Bahalwan | 2001 | 2002 |
| (Indonesia) Zein Al Haddad | 2002 | 2003 |
| (Brazil) Jacksen F. Tiago | 2003 | 2005 |
| (Indonesia) Freddy Muli | 2005 | 2006 |
| (Brazil) Gildo Rodrigues | 2006 | 2007 |
| (Indonesia) Ibnu Grahan | 2007 | 2007 |
| (Indonesia) Suhatman Imam | 2007 | 2007 |
| (Indonesia) Freddy Muli | 2008 | 2008 |
| (Moldova) Arcan Iurie | 2008 | 2008 |
| (Indonesia) Aji Santoso | 2008 | 2008 |
| (Indonesia) Danurwindo | 2009 | 2010 |
| (Indonesia) Rudy Keltjes | 2010 | 2010 |
| (Indonesia) Aji Santoso | 2010 | 2011 |
| (Portugal) Divaldo Alves | 2011 | 2012 |
| (Indonesia) Ibnu Grahan | 2012 | 2013 |
| (Brazil) Fabio Oliveira | 2013 | 2013 |
Team Inactive 2014–2016
| (Indonesia) Iwan Setiawan | 2017 | 2017 |
| (Argentina) Alfredo Vera | 2017 | 2018 |
| (Indonesia) Djadjang Nurdjaman | 2018 | 2019 |
| (Austria) Wolfgang Pikal | 2019 | 2019 |
| (Indonesia) Aji Santoso | 2019 | 2023 |
| (Spain) Josep Gombau | 2023 | 2023 |
| (Northern Ireland) Paul Munster | 2024 | 2025 |
| (Spain) Eduardo Pérez | 2025 | 2025 |
| (Portugal) Bernardo Tavares | 2025 | 2026 |

== Honours ==
| Type | Competition | Titles | Seasons |
|---|---|---|---|
| National (League) | Liga Indonesia Premier Division / Super League | 2 | 1996–1997, 2004 |
| National (League) | Perserikatan | 4 | 1951, 1952, 1978, 1987/1988 |
| National (League) | Liga Indonesia First Division / Liga 2 | 3 | 2003, 2006, 2017 |
| National (Cups) | Piala Utama | 1 | 1990 |
| National (Cups) | Piala Presiden | 1 | 2026 |

=== Other titles ===
- Piala Jusuf
  - Winner: 1970
- Piala Surya
  - Winners (4): 1975, 1976, 1977 (Shared) (Note: extra time not played due to bad light; cup shared, both clubs keeping the trophy for six months (first Persija, then Persebaya)) 1979 (Group Perserikatan)
- Piala Tugu Muda
  - Winner: 1989
- Piala Gubernur Jatim
  - Winners (2): 2006, 2020
- Dirgantara Cup
  - Winner: 2017

=== International Tournament ===
AFC Competitions:

- Asian Club Championship/AFC Champions League
  - 1997–98 – First round
  - 2005 – Group stage
- Asian Cup Winners' Cup
  - 1999–2000 – Second round

Invitational:

- Aga Khan Gold Cup (Note: The competition is widely regarded as the predecessor of AFC Champions League (held for the first time in 1967), since it was the first organized international competition that involved club teams around Asia, organized by the football authorities of East Pakistan, in collaboration with Asian Football Confederation (AFC).)
  - Runner-up: 1970

Friendly:

- Unity Cup
  - Winner: 2011

== Season by season record ==
- Champions
- Runners-up
- Promoted
- Relegated

| Season | League/Division | Teams | Position in league | Piala Indonesia | I-League Cup | AFC competition(s) | | ASEAN Club Championship | |
|---|---|---|---|---|---|---|---|---|---|
| 1994–95 | Liga Indonesia Premier Division | 34 | 9th (East Region) | – | – | – | – | – | |
| 1995–96 | Liga Indonesia Premier Division | 31 | 7th (East Region) | – | – | – | – | – | |
| 1996–97 | Liga Indonesia Premier Division | 33 | 1st | – | – | – | – | – | – |
| 1997–98 | Liga Indonesia Premier Division | 31 | Season abandoned due to political and economic turmoil | – | – | Asian Club Championship | First round | – | |
| 1998–99 | Liga Indonesia Premier Division | 28 | 2nd | – | – | – | – | – | |
| 1999–2000 | Liga Indonesia Premier Division | 28 | 6th (East Region) | – | – | Asian Cup Winners' Cup | Second round | – | |
| 2001 | Liga Indonesia Premier Division | 28 | Semi-finals | – | – | – | – | – | |
| 2002 | Liga Indonesia Premier Division | 24 | 11th (East Region) | – | – | – | – | – | |
| 2003 | Liga Indonesia First Division | 26 | 1st | – | – | – | – | – | |
| 2004 | Liga Indonesia Premier Division | 18 | 1st | – | – | – | – | – | – |
| 2005 | Liga Indonesia Premier Division | 28 | Round of 8 w/o | Quarter final | – | AFC Champions League | Group stage | – | |
| 2006 | Liga Indonesia First Division | 36 | 1st | Quarter final | – | – | – | – | |
| 2007–08 | Liga Indonesia Premier Division | 36 | 14th (Note: clubs 10–18 remain in Premier Division; Starting from the 2008–09 season, the Indonesia Super League was established as the new first tier with the Premier Division demoted to second tier status.) (East Region) | Second round | – | – | – | – | |
| 2008–09 | Liga Indonesia Premier Division | 29 | Semi-finals (4th place) | Third round | – | – | – | – | |
| 2009–10 | Indonesia Super League | 18 | 17th | Quarter final | – | – | – | – | |
| 2010–11 | Liga Primer Indonesia | 19 | season was abandoned at the half-way stage | – | – | – | – | – | |
| 2011–12 | Indonesian Premier League | 12 | 2nd | Semi-finals | – | – | – | – | |
| 2013 | Indonesian Premier League | 16 | season unfinished | – | – | – | – | – | |
| 2014 to 2016 | Team Inactive | | | | | | | | |
| 2017 | Liga 2 | 61 | 1st | – | – | – | – | – | |
| 2018 | Liga 1 | 18 | 5th | Quarter-finals | – | – | – | – | |
| 2019 | Liga 1 | 18 | 2nd | Quarter-finals | – | – | – | – | |
| 2020 | Liga 1 | 18 | Season abandoned due to COVID-19 pandemic in Indonesia | – | – | – | – | – | |
| 2021–22 | Liga 1 | 18 | 5th | – | – | – | – | – | |
| 2022–23 | Liga 1 | 18 | 6th | – | – | – | – | – | |
| 2023–24 | Liga 1 | 18 | 12th | – | – | – | – | – | |
| 2024–25 | Liga 1 | 18 | 4th | – | – | – | – | – | |
| 2025–26 | Super League | 18 | 4th | – | – | – | – | – | |
| 2026–27 | Super League | 18 | TBD | – | TBD | – | – | – | |

== Performance in AFC competitions ==
| Season | Competition | Round | Nat | Club | Home | Away |
|---|---|---|---|---|---|---|
| 1997–1998 | Asian Club Championship | First round | (South Korea) | Ulsan Hyundai Horang-i | 1–2 | 1–4 |
| 1999–2000 | Asian Cup Winners' Cup | Second round | (Thailand) | Bangkok Bank | 0–1 | 0–5 |
| 2005 | AFC Champions League | Group stage | (Thailand) | Krung Thai | 1–2 | 0–1 |
| 2005 | AFC Champions League | Group stage | (Vietnam) | Binh Dinh | 1–0 | 0–0 |
| 2005 | AFC Champions League | Group stage | (South Korea) | Busan IPark | 0–3 | 0–4 |

== Ranking ==
=== World ranking ===
As of 25 October 2026

| Current rank | Country | Team | Points |
|---|---|---|---|
| 1048 | (Uruguay) | C.A. Cerro | 1348 |
| 1049 | (Israel) | Hapoel Haifa | 1348 |
| 1050 | (Indonesia) | Persebaya | 1348 |
| 1051 | (Denmark) | Randers FC | 1348 |
| 1052 | (Netherlands) | Roda JC Kerkrade | 1348 |

=== Asia ranking ===
As of 25 October 2026

| Current rank | Country | Team | Points |
|---|---|---|---|
| 105 | (Turkey) | Giresunspor | 1350 |
| 106 | (India) | East Bengal FC | 1349 |
| 107 | (Indonesia) | Persebaya | 1348 |
| 108 | (China) | Yunnan Yukun F.C. | 1348 |
| 109 | (Saudi Arabia) | Neom SC | 1347 |
