= Diogo Ramalho =

Portuguese footballer (born 1999)

Personal information
- Full name: Diogo Sá Ramalho
- Date of birth: 1 July 1999 (age 27)
- Place of birth: Barcelos, Portugal
- Height: 1.87 m (6 ft 2 in)
- Position: Midfielder

Team information
- Current team: Persebaya Surabaya
- Number: 20

Youth career
- 2010–2011: Fão
- 2011–2012: Braga
- 2012–2015: Marinhas
- 2015–2018: Gil Vicente

Senior career*
| Years | Team | Apps | (Gls) |
| 2018–2019 | Gil Vicente | 14 | (0) |
| 2019–2020 | Varzim B | 19 | (1) |
| 2020–2021 | Mirandela | 26 | (1) |
| 2021–2022 | Leça | 28 | (5) |
| 2022–2023 | Varzim | 18 | (0) |
| 2023–2024 | Vianense | 25 | (0) |
| 2024–2025 | Covilhã | 28 | (6) |
| 2025–2026 | Farul Constanța | 35 | (1) |
| 2026– | Persebaya Surabaya | 5 | (0) |
- * Club domestic league appearances and goals as of 22 October 2026

Diogo Sá Ramalho (born 1 July 1999) is a Portuguese professional footballer who plays as a midfielder for Super League club Persebaya Surabaya.

== Honours ==
Persebaya Surabaya

- Piala Presiden: 2026
