= Yann Mabella =

Republic of the Congo footballer (born 1996)

Personal information
- Full name: Yann Kévin Mabella
- Date of birth: 22 February 1996 (age 30)
- Place of birth: Toulouse, France
- Height: 1.82 m (6 ft 0 in)
- Position: Forward

Team information
- Current team: Persebaya Surabaya
- Number: 14

Youth career
- 2002–2005: Lyon-La Duchère
- 2005–2006: Champagne SPF
- 2006–2011: CAS Cheminots Oullins Lyon
- 2007–2011: Lyon
- 2011–2014: Nancy

Senior career*
Years	Team	Apps	(Gls)
2014–2019	Nancy II	62	(24)
2015–2019	Nancy	5	(0)
2017–2018	→ Châteauroux	9	(2)
2019	Tours II	3	(0)
2019	Tours	11	(1)
2019–2022	Racing-Union	76	(42)
2022–2023	Virton	32	(4)
2023–2024	Waldhof Mannheim	4	(0)
2024–2025	Racing-Union	29	(22)
2025–2026	Terengganu	11	(7)
2026–	Persebaya Surabaya	7	(2)

International career
2021–2024	Congo	8	(0)
- * Club domestic league appearances and goals as of 26 October 2026

Yann Kévin Mabella (born 22 February 1996) is a professional footballer who plays as a forward for Super League club Persebaya Surabaya. Born in France, he represents Congo at international level.

== Club career ==
Mabella made his senior debut with AS Nancy in the 1–1 draw with Tours on 27 February 2015, coming on as a substitute for Alexis Busin.

On 31 January 2019, the last day of the 2018–19 winter transfer window, Mabella left Nancy to join Championnat National side Tours FC.

On 11 July 2023, Mabella joined Waldhof Mannheim in the German 3. Liga.

== International career ==
Mabella was born in France to Congolese parents, and was called up to the Congo U23s in 2015. He represented the senior Republic of the Congo national team in a friendly 1–0 win over Niger on 10 June 2021.

== Career statistics ==
As of 15 November 2015

Appearances and goals by club, season and competition
Club	Season	League			National cup		League cup		Total	
Club	Season	Division	Apps	Goals	Apps	Goals	Apps	Goals	Apps	Goals
Nancy	Ligue 2	2014–15	1	0	0	0	0	0	1	0
Nancy	Ligue 2	2015–16	1	0	1	2	2	0	4	2
Career total			2	0	1	2	2	0	5	2

== Honours ==
Persebaya Surabaya

- Piala Presiden: 2026
