= 2025–26 Liga 4 Riau =

Liga 4 Riau
- Season: 2025–26
- Dates: 15 January – 15 February 2026
- Teams: 9
- Champions: Wahana
- Runner up: EBR United
- National phase: Wahana
- Biggest win: Jaya Raya 4–0 Tunas Negeri
- Longest unbeaten run: Wahana
- Longest winless run: Tunas Negeri
- Longest losing run: Tunas Negeri
- All statistics correct as of 15 February 2026.

The 2025–26 Liga 4 Riau (also known as 2025–26 RS Awal Bros Liga 4 Riau for sponsorship reason) will be the second season of Liga 4 Riau after the change in the structure of Indonesian football competition and serves as a qualifying round for the national phase of the 2025–26 Liga 4.

The competition is organised by the Riau Provincial PSSI Association.

== Teams ==
=== Teams changes ===
The following teams changed division after the 2024–25 season.

▲ Promoted to Liga Nusantara
- Pekanbaru

=== Participating teams ===
A total of 9 teams are competing in this season.

No	Team	Location	2024–25 season
1	Kampar Junior	Kampar Regency	—
2	EBR United	Pekanbaru	—
3	Jaya Raya	Pekanbaru	—
4	PSC Young Abadi	Pekanbaru	—
5	Tunas Negeri	Pekanbaru	—
6	Wahana	Pekanbaru	Champions
7	WGroup	Pekanbaru	—
8	PS Siak	Siak Regency	—
9	Nabil	Pelalawan Regency	6th

== First round ==
The draw for the first round took place in January 2026. The 9 teams will be drawn into 2 groups of four or five. The preliminary round will be played in double round-robin matches.

The top two teams of each group will qualify for the second round.

=== Group A ===
All matches will be held at Riau Main Stadium and Gelora Hang Tuah Mini Stadium, Pekanbaru

Pos	Team	Pld	W	D	L	GF	GA	GD	Pts	Qualification	WGR	NFC	SIA	PSC	KJR
1	WGroup	8	6	2	0	20	3	+17	20	Qualification to the second round	—	2–0	1–1	3–1	2–0
2	Nabil	8	5	1	2	19	8	+11	16	Qualification to the second round	0–2	—	0–0	2–0	4–0
3	PS Siak	8	4	3	1	21	9	+12	15		1–1	1–2	—	4–2	5–0
4	PSC Young Abadi	8	1	0	7	11	27	−16	3		0–3	2–3	1–6	—	5–4
5	Kampar Junior	8	1	0	7	9	33	−24	3		0–6	1–8	2–3	2–0	—

Source: 2025–26 Liga 4 Riau
Rules for classification: 1) Points; 2) Head-to-head points; 3) Head-to-head goal difference; 4) Head-to-head goals scored; 5) Goal difference; 6) Goals scored; 7) Fair-play points; 8) Draw.

=== Group B ===
All matches will be held at Wahana Field, Pekanbaru

Pos	Team	Pld	W	D	L	GF	GA	GD	Pts	Qualification	WHN	EBR	JYR	TNS
1	Wahana	6	5	0	1	23	6	+17	15	Qualification to the second round	—	1–2	4–0	7–1
2	EBR United	6	3	2	1	10	6	+4	11	Qualification to the second round	1–2	—	0–0	3–2
3	Jaya Raya	6	1	3	2	6	8	−2	6		1–3	0–0	—	1–1
4	Tunas Negeri	6	0	1	5	6	25	−19	1		1–6	1–4	0–4	—

Source: 2025–26 Liga 4 Riau
Rules for classification: 1) Points; 2) Head-to-head points; 3) Head-to-head goal difference; 4) Head-to-head goals scored; 5) Goal difference; 6) Goals scored; 7) Fair-play points; 8) Draw.

== Second round ==
Pos	Team	Pld	W	D	L	GF	GA	GD	Pts	Qualification
1	Wahana	6	5	0	1	12	3	+9	15	Qualified for the National phase
2	EBR United	6	4	0	2	16	7	+9	12	Qualified for the National phase
3	WGroup	6	3	0	3	8	9	−1	9	
4	Nabil	6	0	0	6	4	21	−17	0	

Source: 2025–26 Liga 4 Riau

== See also ==
- 2025–26 Liga 4
