= Yuran Fernandes =

Cape Verde footballer

Personal information
- Full name: Yuran Fernandes Rocha Lopes
- Date of birth: 19 October 1994 (age 32)
- Place of birth: Sal Rei, Cape Verde
- Height: 1.98 m (6 ft 6 in)
- Position: Centre-back

Team information
- Current team: Persebaya Surabaya
- Number: 4

Youth career
- 2011: Menifute
- 2012: Santa Maria

Senior career*
Years	Team	Apps	(Gls)
2013–2014	Africanos Bragança		
2015–2016	Argozelo	22	(1)
2016–2017	Gafetense	23	(1)
2017	Armacenenses	26	(1)
2018	Louletano	2	(0)
2018–2019	Olhanense	13	(0)
2019–2020	Pinhalnovense	24	(3)
2020–2021	Estrela da Amadora	22	(3)
2021–2022	Torreense	18	(4)
2022–2026	PSM Makassar	110	(17)
2026–	Persebaya Surabaya	1	(0)

International career^{‡}
2025–	Cape Verde	2	(0)
- * Club domestic league appearances and goals as of 5 September 2026 ‡ National team caps and goals as of 3 June 2025

Yuran Fernandes Rocha Lopes (Portuguese: [ˈju.ɾɐn fɨɾ.ˈnɐ̃.dɨʒ ˈʀɔ.ʃɐ ˈlɔpɨʃ]; born 19 October 1994) is a Cape Verdean professional footballer who plays as a centre-back for Super League club Persebaya Surabaya and the Cape Verde national team.

== Club career ==
=== PSM Makassar ===
On 4 June 2022, Fernandes joined to PSM Makassar for the 2022–23 Liga 1. Yuran made his PSM Makassar debut in a pre-season tournament 2022 Indonesia President's Cup against Arema on 11 June 2022.

== International career ==
In March 2025, Fernandes received his first called up to the Cape Verde national team for the matches against Mauritius and Angola in the 2026 FIFA World Cup qualification. He make his debut for Cape Verde in an international friendly which ended in a 1–1 tie with Malaysia on 29 May 2025 in Kuala Lumpur.

== Controversy ==
On 9 May 2025, Fernandes was handed a 12-month ban by the PSSI due to some critical remarks that he made on his personal social media account on 3 May regarding the footballing scene in Indonesia. Additionally, he was also fined IDR 25 million by the PSSI Disciplinary Committee. After being notified of the punishments, PSM Makassar stated that they will appeal the decision.

== Honours ==
Torreense

- Liga 3: 2021–22

PSM Makassar

- Liga 1: 2022–23

Persebaya Surabaya

- Piala Presiden: 2026

Individual

- Liga 1 Team of the Season: 2022–23
- APPI Indonesian Football Award Best 11: 2024–25
