= Wálber =

Brazilian footballer

Personal information
- Full name: José Wálber Mota de Amorim
- Date of birth: 12 June 1997 (age 29)
- Place of birth: Rio Tinto, Brazil
- Height: 1.87 m (6 ft 2 in)
- Position: Centre back

Team information
- Current team: Persebaya Surabaya
- Number: 34

Youth career
- –2016: Botafogo-PB

Senior career*
| Years | Team | Apps | (Gls) |
| 2016–2019 | Botafogo-PB | 35 | (1) |
| 2016 | → Santa Cruz (loan) | 2 | (0) |
| 2018 | → Esporte (loan) | 7 | (0) |
| 2019 | → Sport Recife (loan) | 1 | (0) |
| 2019 | → Athletico Paranaense (loan) | 0 | (0) |
| 2019–2024 | Athletico Paranaense | 6 | (0) |
| 2019 | → Figueirense (loan) | 7 | (1) |
| 2020–2021 | → Guarani (loan) | 36 | (0) |
| 2021 | → Cuiabá (loan) | 11 | (0) |
| 2021 | → Vasco da Gama (loan) | 8 | (0) |
| 2022 | → Novorizontino (loan) | 29 | (0) |
| 2023 | → ABC (loan) | 15 | (0) |
| 2023 | → Guarani (loan) | 13 | (0) |
| 2024 | Água Santa | 10 | (1) |
| 2024 | → Ituano (loan) | 13 | (1) |
| 2024–2026 | Thep Xanh Nam Dinh | 0 | (0) |
| 2026– | Persebaya Surabaya | 1 | (0) |
- * Club domestic league appearances and goals as of 5 September 2026

José Wálber Mota de Amorim (born 12 June 1997), simpy known as Wálber, is a Brazilian professional footballer who plays as a centre-back for Super League club Persebaya Surabaya.

== Career statistics ==
=== Club ===
As of 30 March 2021.

| Club | Season | League | | | State league | | Cup | | Continental | | Other | | Total | |
| Club | Season | Division | Apps | Goals | Apps | Goals | Apps | Goals | Apps | Goals | Apps | Goals | Apps | Goals |
|---|---|---|---|---|---|---|---|---|---|---|---|---|---|---|
| Botafogo-PB | 2016 | Série C | 0 | 0 | 0 | 0 | 0 | 0 | — | | 0 | 0 | 0 | 0 |
| Botafogo-PB | 2017 | Série C | 3 | 0 | 8 | 0 | 1 | 0 | — | | 5 (Note: Appearances in the Copa do Nordeste) | 0 | 17 | 0 |
| Botafogo-PB | 2018 | Série C | 9 | 0 | 4 | 1 | 1 | 0 | — | | 4 | 0 | 18 | 1 |
| Botafogo-PB | 2019 | Série C | 0 | 0 | 0 | 0 | 0 | 0 | — | | 0 | 0 | 0 | 0 |
| Botafogo-PB | Total | | 12 | 0 | 12 | 1 | 2 | 0 | — | | 9 | 0 | 35 | 1 |
| Santa Cruz (loan) | 2016 | Paraibano | — | | 2 | 0 | — | | — | | — | | 2 | 0 |
| Esporte (loan) | 2018 | Paraibano 2ª Divisão | — | | 7 | 0 | — | | — | | — | | 7 | 0 |
| Sport Recife (loan) | 2019 | Série B | 0 | 0 | 1 | 0 | 0 | 0 | — | | 0 | 0 | 1 | 0 |
| Athletico Paranaense (loan) | 2019 | Série A | 0 | 0 | 0 | 0 | 0 | 0 | — | | 0 | 0 | 0 | 0 |
| Athletico Paranaense | 2020 | Série A | 0 | 0 | 6 | 0 | 0 | 0 | — | | 0 | 0 | 6 | 0 |
| Athletico Paranaense | Total | | 0 | 0 | 6 | 0 | 0 | 0 | — | | 0 | 0 | 6 | 0 |
| Figueirense (loan) | 2019 | Série B | 0 | 0 | 0 | 0 | 0 | 0 | — | | 7 (Note: Appearances in the Copa Santa Catarina) | 1 | 7 | 1 |
| Guarani (loan) | 2020 | Série B | 33 | 0 | 3 | 0 | — | | — | | — | | 36 | 0 |
| Cuiabá (loan) | 2021 | Série A | 0 | 0 | 5 | 0 | 1 | 0 | — | | — | | 6 | 0 |
| Career total | | | 45 | 0 | 36 | 1 | 3 | 0 | 0 | 0 | 16 | 1 | 102 | 2 |

== Honours ==
Thep Xanh Nam Dinh

- Vietnamese Super Cup: 2024

Persebaya Surabaya

- Piala Presiden: 2026
