= Júlio César (footballer, born March 1995) =

Brazilian footballer

Personal information
- Full name: Júlio César de Freitas Filho
- Date of birth: 21 March 1995 (age 31)
- Place of birth: Anápolis, Brazil
- Height: 1.89 m (6 ft 2 in)
- Position: Centre-back

Team information
- Current team: Persib Bandung
- Number: 4

Youth career
- Vila Nova
- 2015: Goiás

Senior career*
Years	Team	Apps	(Gls)
2014−2015	Vila Nova	3	(0)
2016−2017	CEOV	2	(0)
2017	Grêmio Anápolis	11	(2)
2017	→ Anápolis (loan)	5	(0)
2017−2018	→ Nacional (loan)	23	(2)
2018−2022	Nacional	89	(3)
2022−2024	Al-Fahaheel	4	(3)
2024–2025	Chiangrai United	14	(2)
2025–	Persib Bandung	32	(2)
- * Club domestic league appearances and goals as of 1 November 2026

Júlio César de Freitas Filho (born 21 March 1995) is a Brazilian professional footballer who plays as a centre-back for Super League club Persib Bandung.

== Professional career ==
Júlio César made his professional debut with Vila Nova in a 1–0 Campeonato Brasileiro Série B loss to Ponte Preta on 21 May 2014. On 26 June 2025, Júlio César signed for Persib Bandung on a two-year contract. He scored an important last-minute winner against PSM Makassar on 17 May 2026 to bring Persib closer to their third league titles in 3 years. The result would be important a week later when Persib drew against Persijap Jepara to seal the title in front of their home supporters.

== Honours ==
Persib Bandung

- Super League: 2025–26
- Piala Presiden runner-up: 2026
