= Alex Martins (footballer, born 1993) =

Brazilian footballer

Personal information
- Full name: Alex Martins Ferreira
- Date of birth: 8 July 1993 (age 33)
- Place of birth: Brazil
- Height: 1.87 m (6 ft 2 in)
- Position: Striker

Team information
- Current team: Persebaya Surabaya
- Number: 39

Senior career*
Years	Team	Apps	(Gls)
2012	Shonan Bellmare	2	(0)
2013	Roma	0	(0)
2014	Brasília	4	(1)
2015	Rio Verde	0	(0)
2016–2017	Fukushima United	33	(7)
2018–2019	Kagoshima United	4	(0)
2018	→ Tochigi (loan)	8	(1)
2019	→ Shanghai Shenxin (loan)	13	(4)
2021	Jeonnam Dragons	18	(3)
2022	Shanghai Jiading Huilong	13	(7)
2023	Bhayangkara	13	(11)
2023–2026	Dewa United	90	(67)
2026–	Persebaya Surabaya	6	(3)
- * Club domestic league appearances and goals as of 26 October 2026

Alex Martins Ferreira (born 8 July 1993) is a Brazilian professional footballer who plays as a striker for Super League club Persebaya Surabaya.

== Club statistics ==
As of match played 26 October 2026.

Club performance			League		Cup		Total	
Season	Club	League	Apps	Goals	Apps	Goals	Apps	Goals
2012	Shonan Bellmare	J2 League	2	0	0	0	2	0
2016	Fukushima United	J3 League	16	2	1	0	17	2
2017	Fukushima United	J3 League	17	5	–		17	5
2018	Kagoshima United	J2 League	4	0	0	0	4	0
2019	Shanghai Shenxin	China League One	13	4	0	0	13	4
2021	Jeonnam Dragons	K League 2	18	3	2	3	20	6
2022	Shanghai Jiading Huilong	China League One	13	7	0	0	13	7
2022–23	Bhayangkara Presisi Indonesia	Liga 1	13	11	–		13	11
2023–24	Dewa United	Liga 1	33	21	–		33	21
2024–25	Dewa United	Liga 1	25	26	–		25	26
2025–26	Dewa United	Super League	32	20	–		32	20
2026–27	Persebaya Surabaya	Super League	6	3	–		6	3
Total			192	102	3	3	195	105

== Honours ==
Persebaya Surabaya

- Piala Presiden: 2026

Individual

- Liga 1 Player of the Month: January 2025, March 2025,
- Liga 1 Team of the Season: 2024–25
- Liga 1 Top Goalscorer: 2024–25
- APPI Indonesian Football Award Best Forward: 2024–25
- APPI Indonesian Football Award Best 11: 2024–25
