= Miguel Pereira (footballer, born 1999) =

Portuguese professional footballer (born 1999)

Personal information
- Full name: Miguel Ângelo Marques Pinto Pereira
- Date of birth: 31 January 1999 (age 27)
- Place of birth: Peso da Régua, Portugal
- Height: 1.80 m (5 ft 11 in)
- Position: Right winger

Team information
- Current team: Persebaya Surabaya
- Number: 11

Youth career
- 2013: Braga
- 2014–2015: Palmeiras
- 2015–2016: Braga
- 2016–2017: Ascoli
- 2017–2018: Espinho
- 2018: Braga

Senior career*
Years	Team	Apps	(Gls)
2018–2019	Taipas	31	(6)
2019–2020	Felgueiras	23	(11)
2020–2021	Espinho	21	(4)
2021–2022	São João de Ver	27	(4)
2022	Oliveirense	6	(0)
2023	São João de Ver	16	(3)
2023–2024	Felgueiras	30	(11)
2024–2026	Lusitânia	64	(13)
2026–	Persebaya Surabaya	7	(3)
- * Club domestic league appearances and goals as of 26 October 2026

Miguel Ângelo Marques Pinto Pereira (born 31 January 1999) commonly known as Miguel Pereira, is a Portuguese professional footballer who plays as a right winger for Super League club Persebaya Surabaya.

== Club career ==
=== Early career ===
Born in Peso da Régua, Portugal, Pereira began his youth development with several clubs, including spells at Braga, Palmeiras, Ascoli, and Espinho. He started his professional career with Taipas, subsequently playing for various clubs in the lower tiers of Portuguese football, such as São João de Ver, Oliveirense, and Felgueiras.

=== Lusitânia ===
In July 2024, Lusitânia announced an agreement to sign Pereira. On 4 August 2024, Pereira made his debut as a starter in a 1–0 away loss to São João de Ver. On 25 August 2024, Pereira scored his first league goal for Lusitânia with scored a brace in a 4–0 home win against Fafe. He made 31 league appearances and scored six goals for Lusitânia during the 2024–25 season, also helped his club win the championship and earn promotion to Liga Portugal 2 after finishing in first place in the promotion stage.

On 28 September 2025, Pereira scored his first league goal of the 2025–26 season, in a 1–2 away win over Feirense.

=== Persebaya Surabaya ===
On 8 July 2026, Pereira signed two-years contract with Indonesian Super League club Persebaya Surabaya ahead of the 2026–27 season. He made his league debut for the Bajul Ijo on 5 September 2026, coming on as a starter in a 1–1 draw against Bhayangkara Presisi.

== Honours ==
Lusitânia

- Liga 3: 2024–25

Persebaya Surabaya

- Piala Presiden: 2026

Individual

- Liga 3 Best Player: 2024–25
