= 2026 Piala Presiden (Indonesia) =

Piala Presiden
2026 Indonesia President's Cup

Tournament details
- Country: Indonesia
- Dates: Piala Presiden Elite: 25 July – 6 August 2026'; Liga 4 Piala Presiden: 30 May – 11 July 2026
- Teams: 8 (Elite); 64 (Liga 4)

Final positions
- Champions: (Indonesia) Persebaya (1st title)
- Runners-up: (Indonesia) Persib Bandung
- Third place: (Indonesia) Persija
- Fourth place: (Indonesia) Arema

Tournament statistics
- Matches played: 16 (Elite); 183 (Liga 4)

The 2026 Piala Presiden (English: 2026 Indonesia President's Cup) is the eighth edition of Piala Presiden, held by the PSSI as a pre-season preparation tournament originally for the 2026–27 Liga Nusantara and the 2026–27 Liga 4 but in later announcements, PSSI announced plans to hold the competition two times for this edition.

Port were the defending champions in the last edition after defeating Oxford United 2–1 in the Si Jalak Harupat Stadium in Bandung.

== Plans after the 2025 edition ==
Following the 2025 Piala Presiden at a meeting of the PSSI Executive Committee in September 2025, the Football Association of Indonesia (PSSI) announced plans to expand the competition for the next edition, potentially involving up to 64 teams from across Indonesia.

Chairman Erick Thohir stated that the expanded format was intended to provide broader competitive opportunities and support youth development across Indonesia, emphasising that Liga Nusantara and Liga 4 teams will be involved with potential requirements for increased youth participation, as part of efforts to strengthen grassroots football.

In April 2026, PSSI announced plans to hold the competition on three different occasions. The one including historic big clubs, one including teams from Liga 4 and one featuring grassroots football.

== Teams ==
=== Elite tournament ===
The competition was made up of Southeast Asian teams.

Team	Appearance	Last appearance	Previous best performance	2025–26 season league ranking
(Indonesia) Persib	8th	2025	Champions (2015)	1st in Indonesia Super League
(Indonesia) Persija	7th	2024	Champions (2018)	3rd in Indonesia Super League
(Indonesia) Persebaya	4th	2022	Runners-up (2019)	4th in Indonesia Super League
(Indonesia) Arema	8th	2025	Champions (2017, 2019, 2022, 2024)	9th in Indonesia Super League
(Indonesia) PSMS	2nd	2018	Fourth place (2018)	7th in Group 1 (Indonesia Championship)
(Thailand) Port (invited)	2nd	2025	Champions (2025)	2nd in Thai League 1
(Singapore) Tampines Rovers (invited)	1st	N/A	Debut	2nd in Singapore Premier League
(Brunei) DPMM (invited)	1st	N/A	Debut	10th in Malaysia Super League

=== Liga 4 tournament ===
The following teams will represent their respective provincial leagues in the national phase.

Sumatra Region
(Aceh) PSAP Sigli (1st)	(Aceh) Al-Farlaky (2nd)	(North Sumatra) PS Paya Bakung United (1st)	(North Sumatra) Binjai City (3rd) (Note: PS Kwarta, who were runners-up of the 2025–26 Liga 4 North Sumatra, withdrew from the national phase due to financial issues. As a result, Binjai City, who finished third, took over their spot in the national phase.)
(Riau) Wahana (1st)	(Riau Islands) 757 Kepri Jaya (1st)	(West Sumatra) PSP Padang (1st)	(West Sumatra) PSPP Padang Panjang (2nd) (Note: PS Kubu Raya, who were runners-up of the 2025–26 Liga 4 West Kalimantan, withdrew from the national phase due to financial issues. As a result, PSPP Padang Panjang, who finished as runners-up of the 2025–26 Liga 4 West Sumatra, took over their spot in the national phase.)
(Jambi) Persebri Batanghari (1st)	Tunas Muda Bengkulu (1st)	(South Sumatra) Porsiba Bukit Asam (2nd) (Note: Siti Fatimah, who were champions of the 2025–26 Liga 4 South Sumatra, withdrew from the national phase due to financial issues. As a result, Porsiba Bukit Asam, who finished as runners-up, took over their spot in the national phase.)	(Lampung) TS Saiburai (2nd) (Note: Tanggamus Farmers Angonsaka, who were champions of the 2025–26 Liga 4 Lampung, withdrew from the national phase due to internal disputes between club management and their players. As a result, TS Saiburai, who finished as runners-up, took over their spot in the national phase.)
Kalimantan Region
(West Kalimantan) Persiwah Mempawah (1st)	(Central Kalimantan) Sylva Kalteng (1st)	(South Kalimantan) Persemar Martapura (1st)	(East Kalimantan) Balikpapan (1st)
Java Region
(Banten) Nathan Lebak (1st)	(Banten) Harin (2nd)	(Jakarta) ASIOP (1st)	PSJS South Jakarta (2nd)
(Jakarta) Villa 2000 B (3rd)	(West Java) Persikotas Tasikmalaya (1st)	(West Java) Persika 1951 (2nd)	(West Java) Pesik Kuningan (3rd)
(West Java) Cimahi United (4th)	(West Java) Persindra Indramayu (R3)	(West Java) Persigar Garut (R3)	(Central Java) Persibangga Purbalingga (1st)
(Central Java) Persak Kebumen (2nd)	(Central Java) Persiharjo Sukoharjo (SF)	(Central Java) Persebi Boyolali (QF) (Note: PSIR Rembang, who were semifinalists of the 2025–26 Liga 4 Central Java, were disqualified following rioting done by their players, club officials, and supporters in their semi-final defeat against Persak Kebumen. The replacement for their spot in the national phase will be Persebi Boyolali, who lost to PSIR in the quarter-finals.)	(Special Region of Yogyakarta) Mataram Utama Manggala (1st)
(East Java) Persepam Pamekasan (1st)	(East Java) Pasuruan United (2nd)	(East Java) Persid Jember (3rd)	(East Java) Persinga Ngawi (4th)
(East Java) Persenga Nganjuk (R4)	(East Java) Persikoba Batu (R4)	(East Java) PS Mojokerto Putra (R4)	(East Java) Triple'S Kediri (R4)
Lesser Sunda Islands Region
(Bali) PS Badung (1st)	(West Nusa Tenggara) PS Daygun (1st)	(West Nusa Tenggara) Persebi Bima (2nd)	(West Nusa Tenggara) Perslotim East Lombok (3rd)
(East Nusa Tenggara) PSN Ngada (1st)	(East Nusa Tenggara) Persena Nagekeo (2nd)	(East Nusa Tenggara) Persada Southwest Sumba (4th) (Note: Bajak Laut, who finished third-place in the 2025–26 Liga 4 East Nusa Tenggara, were ineligible for the national phase as they were not full members of PSSI East Nusa Tenggara at the time of the competition. Their spot in the national phase were taken over by fourth-placed Persada Southwest Sumba instead.)	
Sulawesi Region
(North Sulawesi) Persma 1960 (1st)	(North Sulawesi) Bolsel (2nd)	(Gorontalo) Panua GFC (1st)	(Central Sulawesi) Celebest (1st)
(West Sulawesi) Persimaju Mamuju (1st)	(South Sulawesi) Makassar City (1st)	(South Sulawesi) MRC Bulukumba (2nd)	(Southeast Sulawesi) Unaaha (1st)
Papua Region
(Southwest Papua) Persikos Sorong (1st)	(Southwest Papua) Persemay Maybrat (2nd)	(West Papua (province)) Persipegaf Arfak Mountains (1st)	(Central Papua) Persipani Paniai (1st)
(Central Papua) Persipuncak Puncak (2nd)	(Papua (province)) Persiker Keerom (1st)	(Highland Papua) Wamena United (1st)	(Highland Papua) Persigubin Bintang Mountains (2nd)
(South Papua) Golden (1st)

== Piala Presiden Elite ==
The elite tournament was held on 25 July to 6 August 2026.

=== Venues ===
The group stage matches were used in Bandung for group A and Surabaya for group B. The knockout stage were originally planned to be held in Surabaya, but decided to move all matches to Gianyar due to security considerations and there are no tickets for the matches.

Bandung	2026 Piala Presiden (Indonesia) is located in Java
Jalak Harupat Stadium	2026 Piala Presiden (Indonesia) is located in Java
Capacity: 27,000	2026 Piala Presiden (Indonesia) is located in Java
Surabaya	2026 Piala Presiden (Indonesia) is located in Java
Gelora Bung Tomo Stadium	2026 Piala Presiden (Indonesia) is located in Java
Capacity: 46,806	2026 Piala Presiden (Indonesia) is located in Java

=== Group stage ===
==== Group A ====
Pos	Team	Pld	W	D	L	GF	GA	GD	Pts	Qualification
1	(Indonesia) Persib (H)	3	3	0	0	3	0	+3	9	Advance to the Semi-Final
2	(Indonesia) Arema	3	2	0	1	4	2	+2	6	Advance to the Semi-Final
3	(Singapore) Tampines Rovers	3	0	1	2	3	5	−2	1	
4	(Brunei) DPMM	3	0	1	2	2	5	−3	1	

Source: Piala Presiden 2026
Rules for classification: Tiebreakers
(H) Hosts
25 July 2026
15:30 UTC+7

DPMM	2–2	Tampines Rovers
Rahman 47'; Santis 59'		Higashikawa 3'; Ramli 71'

Si Jalak Harupat Stadium, Bandung Regency
Attendance: 7,324
Referee: Razlan Joffri Ali (Malaysia)
25 July 2026
19:30 UTC+7

Persib	1–0	Arema
Barros 24'

Si Jalak Harupat Stadium, Bandung Regency
Attendance: 23,756
Referee: Yudai Yamamoto (Japan)

28 July 2026
15:30 UTC+7

Tampines Rovers	1–2	Arema
Fox 45+4'		Gustavo 27', 34'

Si Jalak Harupat Stadium, Bandung Regency
Attendance: 22,485
Referee: Naufal Adya Fairuski (Indonesia)
28 July 2026
19:30 UTC+7

DPMM	0–1	Persib
		Sekulić 74'

Si Jalak Harupat Stadium, Bandung Regency
Attendance: 20,358
Referee: Candra (Indonesia)

31 July 2026
15:30 UTC+7

Arema	2–0	DPMM
Gustavo 35', 41'

Si Jalak Harupat Stadium, Bandung Regency
Referee: Razlan Joffri Ali (Malaysia)
31 July 2026
19:30 UTC+7

Persib	1–0	Tampines Rovers
Sekulić 81'

Si Jalak Harupat Stadium, Bandung Regency
Attendance: 21,438
Referee: Yudai Yamamoto (Japan)

==== Group B ====
Pos	Team	Pld	W	D	L	GF	GA	GD	Pts	Qualification
1	(Indonesia) Persebaya (H)	3	3	0	0	4	1	+3	9	Advance to the Semi-Final
2	(Indonesia) Persija	3	1	1	1	6	4	+2	4	Advance to the Semi-Final
3	(Thailand) Port	3	1	1	1	5	4	+1	4	
4	(Indonesia) PSMS	3	0	0	3	1	7	−6	0	

Source: Piala Presiden 2026
Rules for classification: Tiebreakers
(H) Hosts
26 July 2026
15:30 UTC+7

PSMS	0–2	Port
		Shimura 16'; Al Sabhi 54'

Gelora Bung Tomo Stadium, Surabaya
Attendance: 31,080
Referee: Yudai Yamamoto (Japan)
26 July 2026
19:30 UTC+7

Persebaya	1–0	Persija
Pankov 63' (o.g.)

Gelora Bung Tomo Stadium, Surabaya
Attendance: 34,878
Referee: Thoriq Alkatiri (Indonesia)

29 July 2026
15:30 UTC+7

Port	2–2	Persija
Peeradol 18'; Al Sabhi 40'		Arlyansyah 42'; Lončar 52'

Gelora Bung Tomo Stadium, Surabaya
Attendance: 532
Referee: Nazmi Nasaruddin (Malaysia)
29 July 2026
19:30 UTC+7

PSMS	0–1	Persebaya
		Y. Fernandes 45+1'

Gelora Bung Tomo Stadium, Surabaya
Attendance: 6,728
Referee: Yudi Nurcahya (Indonesia)

1 August 2026
15:30 UTC+7

Persija	4–1	PSMS
Arlyansyah 22'; Dethan 80'; Silva 84'; Gustavo 88'		Ikhsan Chan 58'

Gelora Bung Tomo Stadium, Surabaya
Referee: Rio Permana Putra (Indonesia)
1 August 2026
19:30 UTC+7

Persebaya	2–1	Port
Pereira 40'; Martins 47'		Al-Sabhi 30'

Gelora Bung Tomo Stadium, Surabaya
Referee: Yudai Yamamoto (Japan)

=== Knockout stage ===
==== Bracket ====
Semi-finals
4 August 2026
(Indonesia) Persib	2
(Indonesia) Persija	1
4 August 2026
(Indonesia) Persebaya	1
(Indonesia) Arema	0

Final
6 August 2026
(Indonesia) Persib	1 (5)
(Indonesia) Persebaya	1 (6)
Third place play-off
6 August 2026
(Indonesia) Persija	3
(Indonesia) Arema	1

==== Semi-finals ====
4 August 2026
16:30 UTC+8
(15:30 UTC+7)

Persib (Indonesia)	2–1	(Indonesia) Persija
Barros 22'; Sekulić 28'		Kwon 86'

Kapten I Wayan Dipta Stadium, Gianyar Regency
Attendance: 0
Referee: Yudai Yamamoto (Japan)

4 August 2026
21:00 UTC+8
(20:00 UTC+7)

Persebaya (Indonesia)	1–0	(Indonesia) Arema
Y. Fernandes 45+7'

Kapten I Wayan Dipta Stadium, Gianyar Regency
Attendance: 0
Referee: Candra (Indonesia)

==== Third place play-off ====
6 August 2026
16:30 UTC+8
(15:30 UTC+7)

Persija (Indonesia)	3–1	(Indonesia) Arema
Witan 7'; Arlyansyah 73'; Dethan 87'		S. Tuharea 28'

Kapten I Wayan Dipta Stadium, Gianyar Regency
Attendance: 0
Referee: Muhammad Tri Santoso (Indonesia)

==== Final ====
6 August 2026
21:00 UTC+8
(20:00 UTC+7)

Persib (Indonesia)	1–1 (a.e.t.)	(Indonesia) Persebaya
Matricardi 24'		Sananta 20'
Penalties
Barros (penalty missed); Matricardi (penalty scored); R. Tanque (penalty scored); Kakang (penalty scored); J. César (penalty scored); Kusnandar (penalty scored); Al Hamra (penalty missed)	5–6	(penalty scored) Pereira; (penalty scored) Mitrevski; (penalty scored) Y. Mabella; (penalty scored) Ramalho; (penalty missed) Y. Fernandes; (penalty scored) Wálber; (penalty scored) Gledson

Kapten I Wayan Dipta Stadium, Gianyar Regency
Attendance: 0
Referee: Rio Permana Putra (Indonesia)

== Liga 4 Piala Presiden ==
Held from 30 May to 11 July 2026.

=== First round ===
The 64 teams were drawn into 16 groups of four. The first round was played in a home tournament format of single round-robin matches.

The top two teams of each group were qualified for the second round.

==== Group A ====
Pos	Team	Pld	W	D	L	GF	GA	GD	Pts	Qualification	KNG	BAD	VIL	WAH
1	(West Java) Pesik	3	2	0	1	4	2	+2	6	Qualification to the second round		1–0		
2	(Bali) PS Badung	3	1	1	1	5	2	+3	4 (Note: Ranked on head-to-head points: PS Badung 3, Villa 2000 B 0.)	Qualification to the second round				1–1
3	(Jakarta) Villa 2000 B (H)	3	1	1	1	2	5	−3	4		2–1	0–4		
4	(West Kalimantan) Persiwah	3	0	2	1	1	3	−2	2		0–2		0–1	

Source: Liga 4 national phase
Legend: Blue = home team win; Yellow = draw; Red = away team win.
Rules for classification: 1) Points; 2) Head-to-head points; 3) Head-to-head goal difference; 4) Head-to-head goals scored; 5) Goal difference; 6) Goals scored; 7) Fair-play points; 8) Draw.
(H) Hosts

==== Group B ====
Pos	Team	Pld	W	D	L	GF	GA	GD	Pts	Qualification	MKC	MAR	BIM	PBU
1	(South Sulawesi) Makassar City	3	2	1	0	6	1	+5	7	Qualification to the second round		1–0	1–1	
2	(South Kalimantan) Persemar (H)	3	2	0	1	6	2	+4	6	Qualification to the second round			4–1	2–0
3	(West Nusa Tenggara) Persebi Bima	3	1	1	1	4	5	−1	4					2–0
4	(North Sumatra) PS Paya Bakung United	3	0	0	3	0	8	−8	0		0–4			

Source: Liga 4 national phase
Legend: Blue = home team win; Yellow = draw; Red = away team win.
Rules for classification: 1) Points; 2) Head-to-head points; 3) Head-to-head goal difference; 4) Head-to-head goals scored; 5) Goal difference; 6) Goals scored; 7) Fair-play points; 8) Draw.
(H) Hosts

==== Group C ====
Pos	Team	Pld	W	D	L	GF	GA	GD	Pts	Qualification	CMU	757	BPP	PNU
1	(West Java) Cimahi United	3	2	0	1	6	2	+4	6 (Note: Tied on head-to-head points. Ranked on head-to-head goal difference: Cimahi United +1, 757 Kepri Jaya 0, Balikpapan –1.)	Qualification to the second round		0–1		
2	(Riau Islands) 757 Kepri Jaya	3	2	0	1	5	1	+4	6	Qualification to the second round				4–0
3	(East Kalimantan) Balikpapan (H)	3	2	0	1	8	3	+5	6		1–3	1–0		
4	(Gorontalo) Panua GFC	3	0	0	3	0	13	−13	0		0–3		0–6	

Source: Liga 4 national phase
Legend: Blue = home team win; Yellow = draw; Red = away team win.
Rules for classification: 1) Points; 2) Head-to-head points; 3) Head-to-head goal difference; 4) Head-to-head goals scored; 5) Goal difference; 6) Goals scored; 7) Fair-play points; 8) Draw.
(H) Hosts

==== Group D ====
Pos	Team	Pld	W	D	L	GF	GA	GD	Pts	Qualification	WFC	BGA	PPP	SYL
1	(Riau) Wahana	3	3	0	0	6	0	+6	9	Qualification to the second round		2–0	1–0	
2	(Central Java) Persibangga (H)	3	2	0	1	4	3	+1	6	Qualification to the second round			3–1	1–0
3	(West Sumatra) PSPP	3	1	0	2	3	5	−2	3					2–1
4	(Central Kalimantan) Sylva Kalteng	3	0	0	3	1	6	−5	0		0–3			

Source: Liga 4 national phase
Legend: Blue = home team win; Yellow = draw; Red = away team win.
Rules for classification: 1) Points; 2) Head-to-head points; 3) Head-to-head goal difference; 4) Head-to-head goals scored; 5) Goal difference; 6) Goals scored; 7) Fair-play points; 8) Draw.
(H) Hosts

==== Group E ====
Pos	Team	Pld	W	D	L	GF	GA	GD	Pts	Qualification	PMA	MRC	BRI	NLB
1	(North Sulawesi) Persma 1960 (H)	3	2	1	0	7	1	+6	7	Qualification to the second round		0–0	6–1	
2	(South Sulawesi) MRC Bulukumba	3	1	1	1	2	3	−1	4	Qualification to the second round			2–0	
3	(Jambi) Persebri Batanghari	3	1	0	2	4	10	−6	3 (Note: Ranked on head-to-head points: Persebri Batanghari 3, Nathan Lebak 0.)					3–2
4	(Banten) Nathan Lebak	3	1	0	2	5	4	+1	3		0–1	3–0		

Source: Liga 4 national phase
Legend: Blue = home team win; Yellow = draw; Red = away team win.
Rules for classification: 1) Points; 2) Head-to-head points; 3) Head-to-head goal difference; 4) Head-to-head goals scored; 5) Goal difference; 6) Goals scored; 7) Fair-play points; 8) Draw.
(H) Hosts

==== Group F ====
Pos	Team	Pld	W	D	L	GF	GA	GD	Pts	Qualification	PSN	TAS	DYG	FAR
1	(East Nusa Tenggara) PSN	3	1	2	0	6	5	+1	5	Qualification to the second round		3–3		
2	(West Java) Persikotas	3	0	3	0	5	5	0	3	Qualification to the second round			0–0	2–2
3	(West Nusa Tenggara) PS Daygun (H)	3	0	3	0	3	3	0	3		2–2			1–1
4	(Aceh) Al-Farlaky	3	0	2	1	3	4	−1	2		0–1			

Source: Liga 4 national phase
Legend: Blue = home team win; Yellow = draw; Red = away team win.
Rules for classification: 1) Points; 2) Head-to-head points; 3) Head-to-head goal difference; 4) Head-to-head goals scored; 5) Goal difference; 6) Goals scored; 7) Fair-play points; 8) Draw.
(H) Hosts

==== Group G ====
Pos	Team	Pld	W	D	L	GF	GA	GD	Pts	Qualification	MJU	UNA	BJC	PGF
1	(West Sulawesi) Persimaju	3	2	1	0	8	2	+6	7	Qualification to the second round		1–1	2–0	
2	(Southeast Sulawesi) Unaaha (H)	3	2	1	0	7	3	+4	7	Qualification to the second round			2–1	4–1
3	(North Sumatra) Binjai City	3	1	0	2	6	5	+1	3					5–1
4	(West Papua (province)) Persipegaf	3	0	0	3	3	14	−11	0		1–5			

Source: Liga 4 national phase
Legend: Blue = home team win; Yellow = draw; Red = away team win.
Rules for classification: 1) Points; 2) Head-to-head points; 3) Head-to-head goal difference; 4) Head-to-head goals scored; 5) Goal difference; 6) Goals scored; 7) Fair-play points; 8) Draw.
(H) Hosts

==== Group H ====
Pos	Team	Pld	W	D	L	GF	GA	GD	Pts	Qualification	NGJ	PSP	ASP	MUM
1	(East Java) Persenga	3	1	2	0	2	1	+1	5	Qualification to the second round		0–0		
2	(West Sumatra) PSP	3	1	1	1	3	1	+2	4 (Note: Ranked on head-to-head points: PSP 3, ASIOP 0.)	Qualification to the second round			3–0	
3	(Jakarta) ASIOP	3	1	1	1	2	4	−2	4		0–0			2–1
4	(Yogyakarta) Mataram Utama (H)	3	1	0	2	3	4	−1	3		1–2	1–0		

Source: Liga 4 national phase
Legend: Blue = home team win; Yellow = draw; Red = away team win.
Rules for classification: 1) Points; 2) Head-to-head points; 3) Head-to-head goal difference; 4) Head-to-head goals scored; 5) Goal difference; 6) Goals scored; 7) Fair-play points; 8) Draw.
(H) Hosts

==== Group I ====
Pos	Team	Pld	W	D	L	GF	GA	GD	Pts	Qualification	BYI	PAN	KRW	IDM
1	(Central Java) Persebi Boyolali (H)	3	2	1	0	4	1	+3	7	Qualification to the second round		1–0		2–0
2	(Central Papua) Persipani	3	2	0	1	3	2	+1	6	Qualification to the second round			1–0	
3	(West Java) Persika 1951	3	0	2	1	2	3	−1	2		1–1			1–1
4	(West Java) Persindra	3	0	1	2	2	5	−3	1			1–2		

Source: Liga 4 national phase
Legend: Blue = home team win; Yellow = draw; Red = away team win.
Rules for classification: 1) Points; 2) Head-to-head points; 3) Head-to-head goal difference; 4) Head-to-head goals scored; 5) Goal difference; 6) Goals scored; 7) Fair-play points; 8) Draw.
(H) Hosts

==== Group J ====
Pos	Team	Pld	W	D	L	GF	GA	GD	Pts	Qualification	PRB	WMU	JFC	TPS
1	(South Sumatra) Porsiba Bukit Asam	3	2	1	0	4	2	+2	7	Qualification to the second round			1–1	
2	(Highland Papua) Wamena United (H)	3	2	0	1	4	3	+1	6	Qualification to the second round	0–1			1–0
3	(Jakarta) PSJS	3	0	2	1	5	6	−1	2			2–3		2–2
4	(East Java) Triple'S Kediri	3	0	1	2	3	5	−2	1		1–2			

Source: Liga 4 national phase
Legend: Blue = home team win; Yellow = draw; Red = away team win.
Rules for classification: 1) Points; 2) Head-to-head points; 3) Head-to-head goal difference; 4) Head-to-head goals scored; 5) Goal difference; 6) Goals scored; 7) Fair-play points; 8) Draw.
(H) Hosts

==== Group K ====
Pos	Team	Pld	W	D	L	GF	GA	GD	Pts	Qualification	CLB	KER	PMP	LOT
1	(Central Sulawesi) Celebest	3	3	0	0	6	2	+4	9	Qualification to the second round			2–1	
2	(Papua (province)) Persiker (H)	3	2	0	1	7	7	0	6	Qualification to the second round	1–3			3–2
3	(East Java) PS Mojokerto Putra	3	1	0	2	5	6	−1	3			2–3		2–1
4	(West Nusa Tenggara) Perslotim	3	0	0	3	3	6	−3	0		0–1			

Source: Liga 4 national phase
Legend: Blue = home team win; Yellow = draw; Red = away team win.
Rules for classification: 1) Points; 2) Head-to-head points; 3) Head-to-head goal difference; 4) Head-to-head goals scored; 5) Goal difference; 6) Goals scored; 7) Fair-play points; 8) Draw.
(H) Hosts

==== Group L ====
Pos	Team	Pld	W	D	L	GF	GA	GD	Pts	Qualification	NGA	SDA	HFC	TMB
1	(East Java) Persinga (H)	3	3	0	0	12	2	+10	9	Qualification to the second round			4–1	6–1
2	(East Nusa Tenggara) Persada	3	2	0	1	8	3	+5	6	Qualification to the second round	0–2		3–0	
3	(Banten) Harin	3	1	0	2	6	8	−2	3					5–1
4	Tunas Muda Bengkulu	3	0	0	3	3	16	−13	0			1–5		

Source: Liga 4 national phase
Legend: Blue = home team win; Yellow = draw; Red = away team win.
Rules for classification: 1) Points; 2) Head-to-head points; 3) Head-to-head goal difference; 4) Head-to-head goals scored; 5) Goal difference; 6) Goals scored; 7) Fair-play points; 8) Draw.
(H) Hosts

==== Group M ====
Pos	Team	Pld	W	D	L	GF	GA	GD	Pts	Qualification	KBA	HRJ	TSS	GUB
1	(East Java) Persikoba (H)	3	1	2	0	4	2	+2	5	Qualification to the second round		1–1	2–0	
2	(Central Java) Persiharjo	3	1	2	0	5	4	+1	5	Qualification to the second round			3–3	
3	(Lampung) TS Saiburai	3	1	1	1	7	6	+1	4					4–1
4	(Highland Papua) Persigubin	3	0	1	2	2	6	−4	1		1–1	0–1		

Source: Liga 4 national phase
Legend: Blue = home team win; Yellow = draw; Red = away team win.
Rules for classification: 1) Points; 2) Head-to-head points; 3) Head-to-head goal difference; 4) Head-to-head goals scored; 5) Goal difference; 6) Goals scored; 7) Fair-play points; 8) Draw.
(H) Hosts

==== Group N ====
Pos	Team	Pld	W	D	L	GF	GA	GD	Pts	Qualification	PSU	GAR	BSL	SIG
1	(East Java) Pasuruan United (H)	3	2	1	0	4	1	+3	7	Qualification to the second round		1–0		1–1
2	(West Java) Persigar	3	1	1	1	4	4	0	4	Qualification to the second round				1–1
3	(North Sulawesi) Bolsel	3	1	0	2	4	6	−2	3		0–2	2–3		
4	(Aceh) PSAP	3	0	2	1	3	4	−1	2				1–2	

Source: Liga 4 national phase
Legend: Blue = home team win; Yellow = draw; Red = away team win.
Rules for classification: 1) Points; 2) Head-to-head points; 3) Head-to-head goal difference; 4) Head-to-head goals scored; 5) Goal difference; 6) Goals scored; 7) Fair-play points; 8) Draw.
(H) Hosts

==== Group O ====
Pos	Team	Pld	W	D	L	GF	GA	GD	Pts	Qualification	PAM	SAK	PCK	KOS
1	(East Java) Persepam (H)	3	3	0	0	7	1	+6	9	Qualification to the second round			2–1	4–0
2	(Central Java) Persak	3	2	0	1	4	1	+3	6	Qualification to the second round	0–1		1–0	
3	(Central Papua) Persipuncak	3	0	1	2	1	3	−2	1					0–0
4	(Southwest Papua) Persikos	3	0	1	2	0	7	−7	1			0–3		

Source: Liga 4 national phase
Legend: Blue = home team win; Yellow = draw; Red = away team win.
Rules for classification: 1) Points; 2) Head-to-head points; 3) Head-to-head goal difference; 4) Head-to-head goals scored; 5) Goal difference; 6) Goals scored; 7) Fair-play points; 8) Draw.
(H) Hosts

==== Group P ====
Pos	Team	Pld	W	D	L	GF	GA	GD	Pts	Qualification	SID	MAY	GOL	NGK
1	(East Java) Persid (H)	3	3	0	0	6	0	+6	9	Qualification to the second round			4–0	1–0
2	(Southwest Papua) Persemay	3	1	0	2	3	3	0	3 (Note: Tied on head-to-head points. Ranked on head-to-head goal difference: Persemay +1, Golden 0, Persena –1.)	Qualification to the second round	0–1			2–0
3	(South Papua) Golden	3	1	0	2	3	7	−4	3			2–1		
4	(East Nusa Tenggara) Persena	3	1	0	2	2	4	−2	3				2–1	

Source: Liga 4 national phase
Legend: Blue = home team win; Yellow = draw; Red = away team win.
Rules for classification: 1) Points; 2) Head-to-head points; 3) Head-to-head goal difference; 4) Head-to-head goals scored; 5) Goal difference; 6) Goals scored; 7) Fair-play points; 8) Draw.
(H) Hosts

=== Second round ===
The 32 teams were divided into 8 groups of four. The second round was played in a home tournament format of single round-robin matches. The top two teams of each group were qualified for the third round.

==== Group Q ====
Pos	Team	Pld	W	D	L	GF	GA	GD	Pts	Qualification	BGA	KNG	MAR	CMU
1	(Central Java) Persibangga (H)	3	2	1	0	7	3	+4	7	Qualification to the third round			3–2	
2	(West Java) Pesik	3	1	1	1	4	4	0	4	Qualification to the third round	1–1		2–1	
3	(South Kalimantan) Persemar	3	1	0	2	7	6	+1	3 (Note: Ranked on head-to-head points: Persemar 3, Cimahi United 0.)					4–1
4	(West Java) Cimahi United	3	1	0	2	3	8	−5	3		0–3	2–1		

Source: Liga 4 national phase
Legend: Blue = home team win; Yellow = draw; Red = away team win.
Rules for classification: 1) Points; 2) Head-to-head points; 3) Head-to-head goal difference; 4) Head-to-head goals scored; 5) Goal difference; 6) Goals scored; 7) Fair-play points; 8) Draw.
(H) Hosts

==== Group R ====
Pos	Team	Pld	W	D	L	GF	GA	GD	Pts	Qualification	WFC	757	MKC	BAD
1	(Riau) Wahana	3	2	0	1	4	2	+2	6	Qualification to the third round		1–0	0–1	
2	(Riau Islands) 757 Kepri Jaya	3	1	1	1	3	2	+1	4 (Note: Ranked by head-to-head goal difference: 757 Kepri Jaya +1, Makassar City 0)	Qualification to the third round				2–0
3	(South Sulawesi) Makassar City	3	1	1	1	3	3	0	4			1–1		1–2
4	(Bali) PS Badung	3	1	0	2	3	6	−3	3		1–3			

Source: Liga 4 national phase
Legend: Blue = home team win; Yellow = draw; Red = away team win.
Rules for classification: 1) Points; 2) Head-to-head points; 3) Head-to-head goal difference; 4) Head-to-head goals scored; 5) Goal difference; 6) Goals scored; 7) Fair-play points; 8) Draw.

==== Group S ====
Pos	Team	Pld	W	D	L	GF	GA	GD	Pts	Qualification	TAS	PMA	PSP	MJU
1	(West Java) Persikotas	3	2	1	0	4	2	+2	7	Qualification to the third round				2–1
2	(North Sulawesi) Persma 1960	3	1	1	1	1	1	0	4 (Note: Ranked on head-to-head points: Persma 1960 3, PSP 0.)	Qualification to the third round	0–1		1–0	
3	(West Sumatra) PSP	3	1	1	1	2	2	0	4		1–1			
4	(West Sulawesi) Persimaju	3	0	1	2	1	3	−2	1			0–0	0–1	

Source: Liga 4 national phase
Legend: Blue = home team win; Yellow = draw; Red = away team win.
Rules for classification: 1) Points; 2) Head-to-head points; 3) Head-to-head goal difference; 4) Head-to-head goals scored; 5) Goal difference; 6) Goals scored; 7) Fair-play points; 8) Draw.

==== Group T ====
Pos	Team	Pld	W	D	L	GF	GA	GD	Pts	Qualification	UNA	PSN	NGJ	MRC
1	(Southeast Sulawesi) Unaaha (H)	3	3	0	0	7	3	+4	9	Qualification to the third round				2–1
2	(East Nusa Tenggara) PSN	3	2	0	1	9	3	+6	6	Qualification to the third round	1–3			5–0
3	(East Java) Persenga	3	1	0	2	5	6	−1	3		1–2	0–3		
4	(South Sulawesi) MRC Bulukumba	3	0	0	3	2	11	−9	0				1–4	

Source: Liga 4 national phase
Legend: Blue = home team win; Yellow = draw; Red = away team win.
Rules for classification: 1) Points; 2) Head-to-head points; 3) Head-to-head goal difference; 4) Head-to-head goals scored; 5) Goal difference; 6) Goals scored; 7) Fair-play points; 8) Draw.
(H) Hosts

==== Group U ====
Pos	Team	Pld	W	D	L	GF	GA	GD	Pts	Qualification	WMU	CLB	SDA	BYI
1	(Highland Papua) Wamena United	3	2	1	0	7	1	+6	7	Qualification to the third round		3–0		
2	(Central Sulawesi) Celebest	3	1	1	1	2	4	−2	4	Qualification to the third round			1–0	1–1
3	(East Nusa Tenggara) Persada	3	1	0	2	2	5	−3	3		0–3			
4	(Central Java) Persebi Boyolali (H)	3	0	2	1	3	4	−1	2		1–1		1–2	

Source: Liga 4 national phase
Legend: Blue = home team win; Yellow = draw; Red = away team win.
Rules for classification: 1) Points; 2) Head-to-head points; 3) Head-to-head goal difference; 4) Head-to-head goals scored; 5) Goal difference; 6) Goals scored; 7) Fair-play points; 8) Draw.
(H) Hosts

==== Group V ====
Pos	Team	Pld	W	D	L	GF	GA	GD	Pts	Qualification	PAN	NGA	PRB	KER
1	(Central Papua) Persipani	3	3	0	0	7	4	+3	9	Qualification to the third round		2–1		
2	(East Java) Persinga (H)	3	2	0	1	6	2	+4	6	Qualification to the third round			2–0	3–0
3	(South Sumatra) Porsiba Bukit Asam	3	1	0	2	4	6	−2	3		3–4			1–0
4	(Papua (province)) Persiker	3	0	0	3	0	5	−5	0		0–1			

Source: Liga 4 national phase
Legend: Blue = home team win; Yellow = draw; Red = away team win.
Rules for classification: 1) Points; 2) Head-to-head points; 3) Head-to-head goal difference; 4) Head-to-head goals scored; 5) Goal difference; 6) Goals scored; 7) Fair-play points; 8) Draw.
(H) Hosts

==== Group W ====
Pos	Team	Pld	W	D	L	GF	GA	GD	Pts	Qualification	PAM	GAR	MAY	KBA
1	(East Java) Persepam	3	1	2	0	1	0	+1	5 (Note: Ranked on fair-play points: Persepam > Persigar)	Qualification to the third round			0–0	1–0
2	(West Java) Persigar	3	1	2	0	1	0	+1	5	Qualification to the third round	0–0			
3	(Southwest Papua) Persemay	3	0	2	1	1	2	−1	2 (Note: Ranked on fair-play points: Persemay > Persikoba)			0–1		
4	(East Java) Persikoba (H)	3	0	2	1	1	2	−1	2			0–0	1–1	

Source: Liga 4 national phase
Legend: Blue = home team win; Yellow = draw; Red = away team win.
Rules for classification: 1) Points; 2) Head-to-head points; 3) Head-to-head goal difference; 4) Head-to-head goals scored; 5) Goal difference; 6) Goals scored; 7) Fair-play points; 8) Draw.
(H) Hosts

==== Group X ====
Pos	Team	Pld	W	D	L	GF	GA	GD	Pts	Qualification	PSU	SAK	SID	HRJ
1	(East Java) Pasuruan United	3	1	2	0	2	1	+1	5	Qualification to the third round		1–0		0–0
2	(Central Java) Persak	3	1	1	1	2	2	0	4 (Note: Ranked on head-to-head points: Persak 3, Persid 0.)	Qualification to the third round				1–1
3	(East Java) Persid (H)	3	1	1	1	2	2	0	4		1–1	0–1		
4	(Central Java) Persiharjo	3	0	2	1	1	2	−1	2				0–1	

Source: Liga 4 national phase
Legend: Blue = home team win; Yellow = draw; Red = away team win.
Rules for classification: 1) Points; 2) Head-to-head points; 3) Head-to-head goal difference; 4) Head-to-head goals scored; 5) Goal difference; 6) Goals scored; 7) Fair-play points; 8) Draw.
(H) Hosts

=== Third round ===
The 16 teams were divided into 4 groups of four. The third round was played in a home tournament format of single round-robin matches. The top two teams of each group were qualified for the fourth round.

==== Group AA ====
Pos	Team	Pld	W	D	L	GF	GA	GD	Pts	Qualification	PSN	BGA	TAS	757
1	(East Nusa Tenggara) PSN	3	2	1	0	8	1	+7	7 (Note: Ranked on goal difference: PSN +7, Persibangga +3.)	Qualification to the fourth round				3–0
2	(Central Java) Persibangga	3	2	1	0	5	2	+3	7	Qualification to the fourth round	1–1			3–1
3	(West Java) Persikotas	3	1	0	2	3	5	−2	3		0–4	0–1		
4	(Riau Islands) 757 Kepri Jaya	3	0	0	3	1	9	−8	0				0–3	

Source: Liga 4 national phase
Legend: Blue = home team win; Yellow = draw; Red = away team win.
Rules for classification: 1) Points; 2) Head-to-head points; 3) Head-to-head goal difference; 4) Head-to-head goals scored; 5) Goal difference; 6) Goals scored; 7) Fair-play points; 8) Draw.

==== Group BB ====
Pos	Team	Pld	W	D	L	GF	GA	GD	Pts	Qualification	KNG	UNA	PMA	WFC
1	(West Java) Pesik	3	2	1	0	6	2	+4	7	Qualification to the fourth round		1–1		
2	(Southeast Sulawesi) Unaaha (H)	3	1	1	1	5	4	+1	4	Qualification to the fourth round			3–1	1–2
3	(North Sulawesi) Persma 1960	3	1	0	2	2	6	−4	3 (Note: Ranked on head-to-head points: Persma 1960 3, Wahana 0.)		0–3			
4	(Riau) Wahana	3	1	0	2	3	4	−1	3		1–2		0–1	

Source: Liga 4 national phase
Legend: Blue = home team win; Yellow = draw; Red = away team win.
Rules for classification: 1) Points; 2) Head-to-head points; 3) Head-to-head goal difference; 4) Head-to-head goals scored; 5) Goal difference; 6) Goals scored; 7) Fair-play points; 8) Draw.
(H) Hosts

==== Group CC ====
Pos	Team	Pld	W	D	L	GF	GA	GD	Pts	Qualification	NGA	GAR	WMU	SAK
1	(East Java) Persinga (H)	3	2	1	0	7	3	+4	7	Qualification to the fourth round		1–1		
2	(West Java) Persigar	3	1	2	0	4	2	+2	5	Qualification to the fourth round			1–1	2–0
3	(Highland Papua) Wamena United	3	1	1	1	7	2	+5	4		0–1			6–0
4	(Central Java) Persak	3	0	0	3	2	13	−11	0		2–5			

Source: Liga 4 national phase
Legend: Blue = home team win; Yellow = draw; Red = away team win.
Rules for classification: 1) Points; 2) Head-to-head points; 3) Head-to-head goal difference; 4) Head-to-head goals scored; 5) Goal difference; 6) Goals scored; 7) Fair-play points; 8) Draw.
(H) Hosts

==== Group DD ====
Pos	Team	Pld	W	D	L	GF	GA	GD	Pts	Qualification	PSU	PAN	CLB	PAM
1	(East Java) Pasuruan United	3	2	1	0	6	2	+4	7	Qualification to the fourth round		2–0		2–0
2	(Central Papua) Persipani	3	2	0	1	11	5	+6	6	Qualification to the fourth round			3–1	8–2
3	(Central Sulawesi) Celebest	3	1	1	1	8	7	+1	4		2–2			
4	(East Java) Persepam	3	0	0	3	4	15	−11	0				2–5	

Source: Liga 4 national phase
Legend: Blue = home team win; Yellow = draw; Red = away team win.
Rules for classification: 1) Points; 2) Head-to-head points; 3) Head-to-head goal difference; 4) Head-to-head goals scored; 5) Goal difference; 6) Goals scored; 7) Fair-play points; 8) Draw.

=== Fourth round ===
The 8 teams will be drawn into 2 groups of four. The fourth round will be played in a home tournament format of single round-robin matches.

The top two teams of each group will qualify for the knockout round and promoted to Liga Nusantara. The third placed teams of each group also promoted to Liga Nusantara.

==== Group A (fourth round) ====
Pos	Team	Pld	W	D	L	GF	GA	GD	Pts	Promotion	PSU	KNG	PAN	GAR
1	(East Java) Pasuruan United (P)	3	2	0	1	3	1	+2	6	Qualification to the semi-final and promotion to Liga Nusantara		2–0	0–1	
2	(West Java) Pesik (P)	3	1	1	1	2	2	0	4	Qualification to the semi-final and promotion to Liga Nusantara				2–0
3	(Central Papua) Persipani (P)	3	1	1	1	1	1	0	4	Promotion to Liga Nusantara		0–0		
4	(West Java) Persigar	3	1	0	2	1	3	−2	3		0–1		1–0	

Source: Liga 4 national phase
Legend: Blue = home team win; Yellow = draw; Red = away team win.
Rules for classification: 1) Points; 2) Head-to-head points; 3) Head-to-head goal difference; 4) Head-to-head goals scored; 5) Goal difference; 6) Goals scored; 7) Fair-play points; 8) Draw.
(P) Promoted

==== Group B (fourth round) ====
Pos	Team	Pld	W	D	L	GF	GA	GD	Pts	Promotion	PSN	NGA	BGA	UNA
1	(East Nusa Tenggara) PSN (P)	3	2	1	0	4	2	+2	7	Qualification to the semi-final and promotion to Liga Nusantara				2–1
2	(East Java) Persinga (P)	3	1	1	1	2	2	0	4	Qualification to the semi-final and promotion to Liga Nusantara	0–0		2–1	
3	(Central Java) Persibangga (P)	3	1	0	2	7	5	+2	3 (Note: Ranked by head-to-head points: Persibangga 3, Unaaha 0.)	Promotion to Liga Nusantara	1–2			
4	(Southeast Sulawesi) Unaaha	3	1	0	2	3	7	−4	3			1–0	1–5	

Source: Liga 4 national phase
Legend: Blue = home team win; Yellow = draw; Red = away team win.
Rules for classification: 1) Points; 2) Head-to-head points; 3) Head-to-head goal difference; 4) Head-to-head goals scored; 5) Goal difference; 6) Goals scored; 7) Fair-play points; 8) Draw.
(P) Promoted

=== Knockout round ===
The knockout round uses a single-match system. In the event of a draw during regulation time, the match proceeds to a penalty shoot-out to determine the winner. The knockout round is held from 8 to 11 July 2026. Four teams from the fourth round qualify for this round.

==== Bracket ====
Semi-finals
8 July 2026 — Yogyakarta
(East Java) Pasuruan United (p)	0 (5)
(East Java) Persinga	0 (4)
8 July 2026 — Surakarta
(East Nusa Tenggara) PSN	1 (4)
(West Java) Pesik (p)	1 (5)

Final
11 July 2026 — Yogyakarta
(East Java) Pasuruan United	1
(West Java) Pesik	0

==== Semi-finals ====
8 July 2026
14:30 WIB (UTC+7)

Pasuruan United (East Java)	0–0	(East Java) Persinga
	Report
Penalties
	5–4

Mandala Krida Stadium, Yogyakarta
8 July 2026
14:30 WIB (UTC+7)

PSN (East Nusa Tenggara)	1–1	(West Java) Pesik
	Report
Penalties
	4–5

Sriwedari Stadium, Surakarta

==== Final ====
11 July 2026
14:00 WIB (UTC+7)

Pasuruan United (East Java)	1–0	(West Java) Pesik
Surya 80'	Report

Mandala Krida Stadium, Yogyakarta
