= 2025–26 Persis Solo season =

Indonesian football club season

Persis Solo
2025–26 season
- Owner: PT Persis Solo Saestu
- President: Kaesang Pangarep
- Coach: (Netherlands) Peter de Roo (until 8 November) (Indonesia) Tithan Suryata (caretaker) (Bosnia and Herzegovina) Milomir Šešlija (from 16 December)
- Stadium: Manahan Stadium
- Super League: 16th (relegated)
- Top goalscorer: League: Kodai Tanaka (7); All: Kodai Tanaka (7)
- Highest home attendance: 13,980 v Persija Jakarta (16 August 2025)
- Lowest home attendance: 100 v PSBS Biak (23 August 2025)
- Biggest win: 3–0 v Bali United (H); 212 March 2026
- Biggest defeat: 1–5 v Dewa United (A); 20 December 2025
Home colours	Away colours

The 2025–26 season was Persis Solo's 4th consecutive seasons in top-flight following its success in winning the 2021 Liga 2 title. This is Persis Solo's first season under new head coach Peter de Roo, who replaced the previous Malaysian coach, Ong Kim Swee.

== Season overview ==
Persis Solo kicked off the season with a 2–1 away victory over Madura United. However, after their first 10 league matches, Peter de Roo's team only managed 1 win and 2 draws, while sustaining 7 losses, culminating in a 2–1 away defeat to Persebaya Surabaya on 2 November 2025.

The match ended up being Peter's last match in charge of the Persis Solo team. Persis Solo hosted the next match on 8 November against PSIM Yogyakarta, with Tithan Suryata taking charge as interim manager.

On 16 December 2025, Persis Solo officially announced the appointment of Bosnian Milomir Šešlija as its new head coach. Milomir was brought back to Laskar Sambernyawa after previously coaching them in the 2024 season.

In an effort to avoid relegation, Persis Solo replaced all of its foreign players in the mid-season transfer window. A total of nine foreign players left the club via loan or contract termination.

Although these player changes helped Persis Solo improve their performances and begin winning matches, the club remained in the relegation zone until the 33rd week of the season. Their survival in the Super League was ultimately determined in the final match against Persita Tangerang. To avoid relegation, Persis Solo needed to secure a victory while hoping that Madura United,their rival for relegation, would either lose or draw their match.

Despite defeating Persita Tangerang 3–1, Persis Solo were relegated after Madura United defeated PSM Makassar 2–0 in a simultaneous match.

Persis Solo and PSM Makassar finished the league season level on 34 points; however, PSM Makassar held a superior head-to-head record.

As a result, Laskar Sambernyawa finished 16th in the final Super League standings and were relegated to the Championship for the following season.

== Squad ==
As of 5 February 2026

No.	Player	Nationality	Date of birth (age)	Previous club	Notes
Goalkeepers
1	Muhammad Riyandi	(Indonesia)	3 January 2000 (age 26)	(Indonesia) Barito Putera	
20	Muhammad Faza	(Indonesia)	6 August 2005 (age 20)	(Indonesia) Persis U-20	
23	I Gede Aditya	(Indonesia)	4 July 2004 (age 21)	(Indonesia) Persis U-20	
54	Vukašin Vraneš	(Serbia)	22 July 1997 (age 28)	(Austria) FC Mauerwerk	Joined in January 2026
Defenders
6	Luka Dumančić	(Croatia)	27 October 1998 (age 27)	(Lithuania) FK Žalgiris	Joined in January 2026
26	Rian Miziar	(Indonesia)	13 October 1990 (age 35)	(Indonesia) Muba Babel United	
29	Faqih Maulana	(Indonesia)	11 September 2004 (age 21)	(Indonesia) Persis U-20	
30	Eky Taufik	(Indonesia)	15 February 1991 (age 35)	(Indonesia) Persela Lamongan	
32	Kadek Raditya	(Indonesia)	13 June 1999 (age 27)	(Indonesia) Persebaya Surabaya	On loan from Persebaya Surabaya
44	Dušan Mijic	(Serbia)	17 June 1993 (age 33)	(Uzbekistan) Qizilqum FC	Joined in January 2026
47	Agung Mannan	(Indonesia)	6 August 1998 (age 27)	(Indonesia) Dewa United	
56	Alfriyanto Nico	(Indonesia)	3 April 2003 (age 23)	(Indonesia) Persija Jakarta	On loan from Persija jakarta
71	Rizky Syahputra	(Indonesia)	27 June 2006 (age 20)	(Indonesia) Persis U-20	
13	Dodi Alekvan Djin	(Indonesia)	31 December 1998 (age 27)	(Indonesia) Persela Lamongan	Joined in January 2026
Midfielders
5	Andrei Alba	(Brazil)	14 January 1995 (age 31)	(India) SC Delhi	Joined in January 2026
10	Dimitri Lima	(Brazil)	15 May 1995 (age 31)	(South Korea) Hwaseong FC	Joined in February 2026
11	Yabes Roni	(Indonesia)	6 February 1995 (age 31)	(Indonesia) Bali United	On loan from Bali United
22	Sutanto Tan	(Indonesia)	4 May 1994 (age 32)	(Indonesia) PSM Makassar	
69	Rexo Dolby	(Indonesia)	14 November 2005 (age 20)	(Indonesia) Persis U-20	
78	Zanadin Fariz	(Indonesia)	31 May 2004 (age 22)	(Indonesia) Persis U-20	
88	Miroslav Maričić	(Serbia)	21 January 1998 (age 28)	(Bosnia and Herzegovina) FK Radnik Bijeljina	Joined in January 2026
Forwards
4	Abu Kamara	(Liberia)	1 April 1997 (age 29)	(Indonesia) PSM Makassar	Joined in February 2026
7	Irfan Jauhari	(Indonesia)	31 January 2001 (age 25)	(Indonesia) Bali United	
8	Arkhan Kaka	(Indonesia)	2 September 2007 (age 18)	(Indonesia) Persis U-20	
9	Bruno Gomes	(Brazil)	19 July 1996 (age 29)	(Indonesia) Semen Padang	Joined in February 2026
18	Febri Hariyadi	(Indonesia)	19 February 1996 (age 30)	(Indonesia) Persib Bandung	On loan from Persib Bandung
19	Dejan Tumbas	(Serbia)	5 August 1999 (age 26)	(Indonesia) Persebaya Surabaya	Joined in February 2026
36	Althaf Indie	(Indonesia)	6 January 2003 (age 23)	(Indonesia) Persis U-20	
40	Ikhwan Tanamal	(Indonesia)	28 December 2003 (age 22)	(Indonesia) Persib Bandung	On loan from Persib Bandung
77	Jefferson Carioca	(Brazil)	16 November 2001 (age 24)	(South Korea) Ansan Greeners	Joined in January 2026
97	Septian Bagaskara	(Indonesia)	26 September 1997 (age 28)	(Indonesia) Dewa United	Joined in January 2026
99	Roman Paparyga	(Ukraine)	9 July 1999 (age 26)	(Uzbekistan) Qizilqum FC	Joined in January 2026
Left during season
2	Ibrahim Sanjaya	(Indonesia)	26 August 1997 (age 28)	(Indonesia) Madura United	Loaned to PSIS Semarang
10	Kodai Tanaka	(Japan)	23 December 1999 (age 26)	(Singapore) Balestier Khalsa	Loaned to Dewa United
11	Sidik Saimima	(Indonesia)	4 June 1997 (age 29)	(Indonesia) Bali United	Loaned to Garudayaksa F.C.
14	Sho Yamamoto	(Japan)	12 November 1996 (age 29)	(Indonesia) Persebaya Surabaya	Loaned to Bhayangkara Presisi
18	Arapenta Poerba	(Indonesia)	1 November 1998 (age 27)	(Indonesia) Dewa United	Loaned to Garudayaksa F.C.
19	Cleylton	(Brazil)	19 March 1993 (age 33)	(Malaysia) Kedah Darul Aman	Loaned to Borneo Samarinda
28	Yulfikar Mansur	(Indonesia)	25 February 2006 (age 20)	(Indonesia) Persis U-20	Loaned to Kendal Tornado
31	Gianluca Pandeynuwu	(Indonesia)	9 November 1997 (age 28)	(Indonesia) Borneo Samarinda	Loaned to Arema Malang
37	Zulfahmi Arifin	(Singapore)	5 October 1991 (age 34)	(Singapore) Hougang United	Loaned to Immigration F.C.
77	Adriano Castanheira	(Portugal)	7 April 1993 (age 33)	(Indonesia) Malut United	Loaned to Persikad Depok
–	Clayton da Silva	(Brazil)	23 October 1995 (age 30)	(India) Diamond Harbour	Loaned to PSMS Medan
4	Xandro Schenk	(Netherlands)	28 April 1993 (age 33)	(Bulgaria) Septemvri Sofia	Released
5	Jordy Tutuarima	(Netherlands)	28 April 1993 (age 33)	(Armenia) FC Noah	Released
6	Fuad Sule	(Republic of Ireland)	20 January 1997 (age 29)	(Northern Ireland) Glentoran F.C.	Released
9	Gervane Kastaneer	(Curaçao)	9 June 1996 (age 30)	(Indonesia) Persib Bandung	Released
15	Giovani Numberi	(Indonesia)	22 April 2000 (age 26)	(Indonesia) PSIS Semarang	Released

== Coaching staff ==
Position	Name
Head coach	(Bosnia and Herzegovina) Milomir Šešlija
Assistant coach	(Serbia) Milos Durovic
Assistant coach	(Malaysia) Zulhazman Zulazwar
Assistant coach	(Indonesia) Tithan Suryata
Goalkeeper coach	(Indonesia) Eddy Harto
Assistant goalkeeper coach	(Indonesia) Rizki Arya Adinata
Fitness coach	(Malaysia) Khairulanwar Md Isa
Analyst	(Indonesia) Taufik Novianto
Team Doctor	(Indonesia) dr. Iwan Utomo
Physiotherapist	(Indonesia) Rudi Suseno
Physiotherapist	(Indonesia) Deka Bagus Kurniagung
Masseur	(Indonesia) Fernando Nugroho

== Transfers ==
=== In ===
Date	Position	Player	From	Ref
Pre-Season
28 June 2025	DF	(Indonesia) Agung Mannan	(Indonesia) Dewa United	
29 June 2025	MF	(Indonesia) Sidik Saimima	(Indonesia) Bali United	
30 June 2025	MF	(Indonesia) Arapenta Poerba	(Indonesia) Dewa United	
1 Juli 2025	DF	(Indonesia) Ibrahim Sanjaya	(Indonesia) Madura United	
4 July 2025	FW	(Japan) Kodai Tanaka	(Singapore) Balestier Khalsa	
9 July 2025	FW	(Portugal) Adriano Castanheira	(Indonesia) Malut United	
12 July 2025	DF	(Netherlands) Xandro Schenk	(Bulgaria) Septemvri Sofia	
12 July 2025	MF	(Republic of Ireland) Fuad Sule	(Northern Ireland) Glentoran	
11 August 2025	FW	(Curaçao) Gervane Kastaneer	(Indonesia) Persib Bandung	
14 August 2025	MF	(Singapore) Zulfahmi Arifin	(Singapore) Hougang United	
Mid-Season
18 January 2026	DF	(Serbia) Dušan Mijic	(Uzbekistan) Qizilqum FC	
18 January 2026	GK	(Serbia) Vukašin Vraneš	(Austria) FC Mauerwerk	
20 January 2026	MF	(Serbia) Miroslav Maričić	(Bosnia and Herzegovina) FK Radnik Bijeljina	
26 January 2026	DF	(Croatia) Luka Dumančić	(Lithuania) FK Žalgiris	
28 January 2026	FW	(Ukraine) Roman Paparyga	(Uzbekistan) Qizilqum FC	
30 January 2026	FW	(Brazil) Clayton da Silva	(India) Diamond Harbour	
30 January 2026	MF	(Brazil) Andrei Alba	(India) SC Delhi	
2 February 2026	MF	(Brazil) Dimitri Lima	(South Korea) Hwaseong FC	
4 February 2026	FW	(Brazil) Jefferson Carioca	(South Korea) Ansan Greeners	
5 February 2026	DF	(Indonesia) Dodi Alekvan Djin	(Indonesia) Persela Lamongan	
9 February 2026	FW	(Serbia) Dejan Tumbas	(Indonesia) Persebaya Surabaya	
10 February 2026	FW	(Liberia) Abu Kamara	(Indonesia) PSM Makassar	
12 February 2026	FW	(Brazil) Bruno Gomes	(Indonesia) Semen Padang	

=== Loan in ===
Date	Position	Player	Loaned From	Ref
Pre-Season
8 July 2025	FW	(Indonesia) Ikhwan Tanamal	(Indonesia) Persib Bandung	
Mid-Season
9 January 2026	DF	(Indonesia) Alfriyanto Nico	(Indonesia) Persija Jakarta	
20 January 2026	MF	(Indonesia) Yabes Roni	(Indonesia) Bali United	
21 January 2026	DF	(Indonesia) Kadek Raditya	(Indonesia) Persebaya Surabaya	
5 February 2026	FW	(Indonesia) Septian Bagaskara	(Indonesia) Dewa United	
16 February 2026	FW	(Indonesia) Febri Hariyadi	(Indonesia) Persib Bandung	

=== Out ===
Position	Player	To	Ref
Pre-Season
FW	(Mali) Moussa Sidibé	(Malaysia) Johor Darul Ta'zim	
FW	(Indonesia) Ramadhan Sananta	(Brunei) DPMM	
FW	(Brazil) Jhon Cley	(Brazil) Confiança	
DF	(Brazil) Eduardo Kunde	(Azerbaijan) Gabala SC	
MF	(Argentina) Lautaro Belleggia	(Brazil) Volta Redonda FC	
DF	(Indonesia) Mochammad Zaenuri	Free Agent	
DF	(Indonesia) Gardhika Arya	Free Agent	
MF	(Indonesia) Fransiskus Alesandro	(Indonesia) Madura United	
MF	(Indonesia) Braif Fatari	Free Agent	
FW	(Indonesia) Romadona Dwi Kusuma	Free Agent	
MF	(Indonesia) Abdul Aziz Lutfi Akbar	(Indonesia) Persib Bandung	
MF	(Indonesia) Ripal Wahyudi	(Indonesia) Semen Padang	
DF	(Indonesia) Rizky Dwi Febrianto	(Indonesia) Bali United	
FW	(Indonesia) Marcell Rumkabu	Free Agent	
Mid-Season
DF	(Indonesia) Giovani Numberi	Madura United	
DF	(Netherlands) Jordy Tutuarima		
FW	(Curaçao) Gervane Kastaneer	(Malaysia) Terengganu FC	
DF	(Netherlands) Xandro Schenk	(Spain) CF Intercity	
DF	(Republic of Ireland) Fuad Sule	(Northern Ireland) Ballymena United	

=== Loan out ===
Date	Position	Player	Loaned To	Ref
Pre-Season
12 July 2024	GK	(Indonesia) Erlangga Setyo	(Indonesia) PSPS Pekanbaru	
Mid-Season
20 January 2026	MF	(Indonesia) Sidik Saimima	(Indonesia) Garudayaksa F.C.	
20 January 2026	MF	(Indonesia) Arapenta Poerba	(Indonesia) Garudayaksa F.C.	
25 January 2026	GK	(Indonesia) Gianluca Pandeynuwu	(Indonesia) Arema Malang	
27 January 2026	DF	(Brazil) Cleylton Santos	(Indonesia) Borneo Samarinda	
5 February 2026	MF	(Singapore) Zulfahmi Arifin	(Malaysia) Immigration F.C.	
5 February 2026	MF	(Portugal) Adriano Castanheira	(Indonesia) Persikad Depok	
5 February 2026	MF	(Japan) Sho Yamamoto	(Indonesia) Bhayangkara Presisi	
5 February 2026	FW	(Japan) Kodai Tanaka	(Indonesia) Dewa United	
5 February 2026	FW	(Brazil) Clayton da Silva	(Indonesia) PSMS Medan	
6 February 2026	DF	(Indonesia) Ibrahim Sanjaya	(Indonesia) PSIS Semarang	
6 February 2026	DF	(Indonesia) Yulfikar Mansur	(Indonesia) Kendal Tornado	

== Pre-season ==
Win Draw Loss

=== Friendly matches ===
12 July 2025 Friendly Match	Persis Solo	2–0	Kendal Tornado F.C.	Surakarta
15:30 UTC+7				Stadium: Stadion UNS; Attendance: 0

19 July 2025 Friendly Match	PSIM	0–1	Persis Solo	Bantul
15:30 UTC+7				Attendance: 0

23 July 2025 Friendly Match	Persis Solo	2–1	Malut United	Yogyakarta
15:30 UTC+7				Attendance: 0

30 July 2025 Friendly Match	Persis Solo	6–0	UNSA FC	Surakarta
15:30 UTC+7				Stadium: Stadion UNS; Attendance: 0

3 August 2025 Friendly Match	Persis Solo	1–2	Bali United	Surakarta
15:30 UTC+7				Stadium: Stadion UNS; Attendance: 0

== Competitions ==
=== Overview ===
Competition	First match	Last match	Starting round	Final position	Record							
Competition	First match	Last match	Starting round	Final position	Pld	W	D	L	GF	GA	GD	Win %
Indonesia Super League	9 August 2025	23 May 2026	Matchday 1	16th	34	8	10	16	39	59	−20	23.53
Total					34	8	10	16	39	59	−20	23.53

Source: Competitions

=== Indonesia Super League ===
==== Results by matchday ====
Matchday	1	2	3	4	5	6	7	9	10	11	12	13	14	15	8 (Note: The week 8 match was originally scheduled for 3 October 2025, but was postponed as a form of full support for the Indonesia national football team in the fourth round of the 2026 FIFA World Cup qualification.)	16	17	18	19	20	21	22	23	24	25	26	27	28	29	30	31	32	33	34
Ground	A	H	A	A	H	A	H	H	A	A	H	A	H	A	A	H	A	H	H	A	H	H	H	A	H	A	H	A	H	A	A	H	H	
Result	W	L	D	L	L	L	D	L	L	L	D	D	L	L	L	L	W	L	L	D	D	D	W	D	W	D	W	L	W	L	L	D	W	
Position	5	8	9	13	16	17	17	16	17	17	17	18	18	18	18	18	16	18	18	18	18	18	17	17	15	15	15	16	15	16	16	16	16	

Updated to match(es) played on 11 August 2025. Source: Matches
A = Away; H = Home; W = Win; D = Draw; L = Loss; P = Postponed

==== Matches ====
Win Draw Loss

09 August 2025 1	Madura United	1–2	Persis Solo	Pamekasan, Madura
19:00 UTC+7	Valeriy Hryshyn (yellow card) 23'; Kerim Palić 74'; Ruxi (yellow card) 90+8'	(LIB) (ILMS)	Sho Yamamoto 32' (yellow card) 39' (yellow-red card) 79'; Kodai Tanaka 61'	Stadium: Gelora Ratu Pamelingan Stadium; Attendance: 4839; Referee: Zaenuddin

16 August 2025 2	Persis Solo	0–3	Persija Jakarta	Surakarta, Central Java
19:00 UTC+7	Sidik Saimima (yellow card) 16'; Gervane Kastaneer (yellow card) 82'; Zulfahmi Arifin (yellow card) 90'; Cleylton (yellow card) 90+4'	(LIB) (LIBMS)	Van Basty (yellow card) 28'; França 45+1'; Emaxwell 62'; Eksel 90+3'; Allano (yellow card) 66' (yellow-red card) 90+4'	Stadium: Manahan Stadium; Attendance: 13980; Referee: Asep Yandis

23 August 2025 3	PSBS Biak	2–2	Persis Solo	Sleman, Yogyakarta
15:30 UTC+7	Ruyeri Blanco 32'; Luquinhas 68' (pen.); Eduardo Barbosa (yellow card) 90'; Nelson Alom (yellow card) 90+2'	(LIB) (LIBMS)	Sho Yamamoto 9'; Cleylton (yellow card) 35'; Arapenta Poerba (yellow card) 49'; Xandro Schenk (yellow card) 60'; Jordy Tutuarima 78'	Stadium: Maguwoharjo Stadium; Attendance: 100; Referee: Aprisman Aranda

29 August 2025 4	Bhayangkara Presisi	2–0	Persis Solo	Bandar Lampung, Lampung
15:30 UTC+7	Ilija Spasojević 24'; Ardi Idrus (yellow card) 46'; Fareed Sadat 53' (yellow card) 53'; Léo Silva (yellow card) 90+1'	(LIB) (LIBMS)		Stadium: Sumpah Pemuda Stadium; Attendance: 2214; Referee: Nendi Rohaendi

13 September 2025 5	Persis Solo	1–2	Persijap Jepara	Surakarta, Central Java
19:00 UTC+7	Sho Yamamoto (red card) 73'; Cleylton 77'	(LIB) (LIBMS)	Elvis Sakyi (yellow card) 25'; França (yellow card) 45'; Dicky Kurniawan (yellow card) 45'; Rosalvo 51'; Sudi Abdallah (yellow card) 68' (goal) 90+13' (pen.)	Stadium: Manahan Stadium; Attendance: 10691; Referee: Muhammad Tri Santoso

22 September 2025 6	Borneo Samarinda	1–0	Persis Solo	Samarinda, East Kalimantan
19:00 UTC+7	Fajar Fathur Rahman (yellow card) 83'; Peralta 90+8'	(LIB) (ILMS)	Althaf Indie (yellow card) 82'; Eky Taufik (yellow card) 90+9'	Stadium: Segiri Stadium; Referee: Eko Saputro

28 September 2025 7	Persis Solo	2–2	Arema Malang	Surakarta, Central Java
15:30 UTC+7	Kodai Tanaka 12'; Althaf Indie (yellow card) 45+3'; Kodai Tanaka (yellow card) 68'; Gervane Kastaneer 90+1'; Jose Cleylton (yellow card) 90+5'	(LIB) (LIBMS)	Salim Tuharea (yellow card) 22'; Odivan Koerich (yellow card) 50'; Ian Puleio (yellow card) 68'; Dalberto 78'; Arkhan Fikri 88'	Stadium: Manahan Stadium; Attendance: 5515; Referee: Heru Cahyono

3 October 2025 8 Postponed	Persik Kediri	–	Persis Solo	Kediri, East Java
15:30 UTC+7		[Report (LIB)] [Report (LIBMS)]		Stadium: Brawijaya Stadium

20 October 2025 9	Persis Solo	1–3	Malut United F.C.	Surakarta, Central Java
19:00 UTC+7	Cleylton (yellow card) 26'; Kodai Tanaka 68'	(LIB) (LIBMS)	Tyronne del Pino 30'; Ridho Syuhada (yellow card) 39'; Tyronne del Pino 53'; Yakob Sayuri (yellow card) 45+4' (goal) 58'; Wbeymar Angulo (yellow card) 62'	Stadium: Manahan Stadium; Attendance: 3371; Referee: Pipin Indra Pratama

27 October 2025 10	Persib Bandung	2–0	Persis Solo	Bandung, West Java
19:00 UTC+7	Guaycochea 12' (red card) 28'; Uilliam Barros 48'	(LIB) (LIBMS)	Kodai Tanaka (yellow card) 45+1'; Sidik Saimima (yellow card) 85'	Stadium: Gelora Bandung Lautan Api Stadium; Attendance: 13540; Referee: Rio Permana Putra

2 November 2025 11	Persebaya Surabaya	2–1	Persis Solo	Surabaya, East Java
19:00 UTC+7	Mihailo Perović 45+2'; Francisco Rivera 51'	(LIB) (LIBMS)	Kodai Tanaka 15'; Arapenta Poerba (yellow card) 75'	Stadium: Gelora Bung Tomo Stadium; Attendance: 9428; Referee: Naufal Adya Fairuski

8 November 2025 12	Persis Solo	2–2	PSIM Yogyakarta	Surakarta, Central Java
19:00 UTC+7	Kodai Tanaka (yellow card) 39' (goal) 48'; Cleylton (yellow card) 87' (goal) 90+6'; Faqih Maulana (yellow card) 90+7'	(LIB) (LIBMS)	Deri Corfe 26'; Zé Valente 41' (yellow card) 90+8'; Rakhmatsho Rakhmatzoda (yellow card) 79'	Stadium: Manahan Stadium; Attendance: 13676; Referee: Totok Fitrianto

23 November 2025 13	Bali United	0–0	Persis Solo	Gianyar, Bali
19:00 UTC+7	Brandon Wilson (yellow card) 43'; Kadek Arel (yellow card) 45+2'; Jens Raven (yellow card) 90+3'	(LIB) (LIBMS)	Cleylton (yellow card) 60'; Xandro Schenk (yellow card) 89'	Stadium: Kapten I Wayan Dipta Stadium; Attendance: 3,811; Referee: Sance Lawita

29 November 2025 14	Persis Solo	3–4	PSM Makassar	Surakarta, Central Java
19:00 UTC+7	Xandro Schenk 9'; Gervane Kastaneer 61' 79' (yellow card) 64'; Cleylton (yellow card) 90+9'	(LIB) (LIBMS)	Jacques Thémopelé (yellow card) 53'; Yuran Fernandes 68'; Muhammad Arfan (yellow card) 69'; Sávio Roberto 72'; Daisuke Sakai 81'; Alex Tanque 90'	Stadium: Manahan Stadium; Attendance: 4423; Referee: Asep Yandis

20 December 2025 15	Dewa United	5–1	Persis Solo	Serang, Banten
15:30 UTC+7	Alex Martins 16'; Kodai Tanaka 18' (o.g.); Alexis Messidoro 21' 86'; Ricky Kambuaya (yellow card) 26'; Zanadin Fariz 83' (o.g.)	(LIB) (LIBMS)	Kodai Tanaka 45+5' (pen.)	Stadium: Banten International Stadium; Attendance: 487; Referee: Gedion Dapaherang

27 December 2025 8 Rescheduled	Persik Kediri	2–1	Persis Solo	Kediri, East Java
15:30 UTC+7	Ezra Walian 20' (pen.); Syahrian Abimanyu (yellow card) 24'; José Enrique 45+1'; Krisna Bayu Otto (yellow card) 61'	(LIB) (LIBMS)	Gervane Kastaneer (yellow card) 18'; Xandro Schenk 90+2'	Stadium: Brawijaya Stadium; Attendance: 4724; Referee: Candra
Note: Fixture was initially scheduled for 3 October, but was moved to support national team fixture.

4 January 2026 16	Persis Solo	1–3	Persita Tangerang	Surakarta, Central Java
15:30 UTC+7	Cleylton (yellow card) 17'; Gervane Kastaneer 62'; Zanadin Fariz (yellow card) 90+11'	(LIB) (LIBMS)	Matheus Alves 5' (yellow card) 51'; Aleksa Andrejić 15' 42'	Stadium: Manahan Stadium; Attendance: 5412; Referee: Mustafa Kamal

11 January 2026 17	Semen Padang	2–3	Persis Solo	Padang, West Sumatra
15:30 UTC+7	Irsyad Maulana 36'; Ricki Ariansyah 90+6'	(LIB) (LIBMS)	Eky Taufik (yellow card) 38'; Zanadin Fariz 45+3'; Kodai Tanaka 50'; Irfan Jauhari 90+1'	Stadium: Gelora Haji Agus Salim Stadium; Attendance: 3150; Referee: Yudai Yamamoto

23 January 2026 18	Persis Solo	0–1	Borneo Samarinda	Surakarta, Central Java
15:30 UTC+7	Sutanto Tan (yellow card) 88'	(LIB) (LIBMS)	Mariano Peralta 15'	Stadium: Manahan Stadium; Attendance: 3510; Referee: Eko Saputra

31 January 2026 19	Persis Solo	0–1	Persib Bandung	Surakarta, Central Java
15:30 UTC+7		(LIB) (LIBMS)	Andrew Jung 40'; Patricio Matricardi (yellow card) 45+4'; Thom Haye (yellow card) 59'; Febri Hariyadi (yellow card) 78'	Stadium: Manahan Stadium; Attendance: 11769; Referee: Muhammad Iqballuddin

6 February 2026 20	PSIM Yogyakarta	0–0	Persis Solo	Bantul, Yogyakarta
15:30 UTC+7	Rendra Teddy (yellow card) 23'; Rio Hardiawan (yellow card) 90+3'	(LIB) (LIBMS)	Roman Paparyha (yellow card) 48'; Septian Bagaskara (yellow card) 77'	Stadium: Sultan Agung Stadium; Attendance: 8476; Referee: Yoko Suprianto

13 February 2026 21	Persis Solo	2-2	Madura United	Surakarta, Central Java
15:30 UTC+7	Irfan Jauhari (yellow card) 35'; Roman Paparyha 42'; Andrei Alba (yellow card) 73'; Dejan Tumbas (yellow card) 79'; Dušan Mijic 90+2'	(LIB) (LIBMS)	Nurdiansyah (yellow card) 21'; Júnior Brandão 33' (pen.); Ferian Rizki (yellow card) 40'; Mendonça 66'; Riquelme Sousa (yellow card) 85'; Aji Kusuma (yellow card) 90+6'	Stadium: Manahan Stadium; Attendance: 3291; Referee: Axel Febrian Sinaga

21 February 2026 22	Persis Solo	1-1	PSBS Biak	Surakarta, Central Java
20:30 UTC+7	Dimitri Lima 29'; Dušan Mijic (yellow card) 41'	(LIB) (LIBMS)	Damianus Putra (yellow card) 31'; Luquinhas 80'	Stadium: Manahan Stadium; Attendance: 5414; Referee: Yudai Yamamoto

1 March 2026 23	Persis Solo	2-1	Persik Kediri	Surakarta, Central Java
20:30 UTC+7	Bruno Gomes 23'; Alfriyanto Nico (yellow card) 30'; Zanadin Fariz (yellow card) 42'; Andrei Alba (yellow card) 45+2'; Althaf Indie (red card) 83'; Roman Paparyha 87'	(LIB) (LIBMS)	José Enrique 31'; Muhamad Firly (yellow card) 67'; Adrián Luna (yellow card) 88'	Stadium: Manahan Stadium; Attendance: 6473; Referee: Muhammad Iqballuddin

5 March 2026 24	Persijap Jepara	0–0	Persis Solo	Jepara, Central Java
20:30 UTC+7	José Espinosa (yellow card) 54' (red card) 79'; Wahyudi Hamisi (yellow card) 63'; França (yellow card) 90+6'	(LIB) (LIBMS)	Alfriyanto Nico (yellow card) 66'; Abu Kamara (yellow card) 83'	Stadium: Gelora Bumi Kartini Stadium; Attendance: 6557; Referee: Rio Permana Putra

12 March 2026 25	Persis Solo	3-0	Bali United	Surakarta, Central Java
20:30 UTC+7	Dejan Tumbas 32'; Miroslav Maričić (yellow card) 35'; Bruno Gomes 41' 90+9'; Kadek Raditya (yellow card) 70'; Muhammad Riyandi (yellow card) 71'; Dimitri Lima (yellow card) 90+11'	(LIB) (LIBMS)	Kadek Agung (yellow card) 39'; Ricky Fajrin (yellow card) 56'; Teppei Yachida (yellow card) 57'; Kadek Arel (yellow card) 74'	Stadium: Manahan Stadium; Attendance: 7131; Referee: Candra

4 April 2026 26	PSM Makassar	1-1	Persis Solo	Parepare, South Sulawesi
15:30 UTC+7	Yuran Fernandes 18'; Abdul Rahman (yellow card) 84'	(LIB) (LIBMS)	Roman Paparyha 65' (yellow card) 73'	Stadium: Gelora B.J. Habibie; Attendance: 1285; Referee: Yudai Yamamoto

12 April 2026 27	Persis Solo	2-1	Semen Padang	Surakarta, Central Java
15:30 UTC+7	Miroslav Maričić 37'; Dejan Tumbas 78'	(LIB) (LIBMS)	Ravy Tsouka (yellow card) 58'; Ângelo Meneses (yellow card) 63'; Sutanto Tan 68' (o.g.)	Stadium: Manahan Stadium; Attendance: 0 (Note: The match was played behind closed doors.); Referee: Thoriq Alkatiri

18 April 2026 28	Arema Malang	2-0	Persis Solo	Kepanjen, East Java
15:30 UTC+7	Arkhan Fikri (yellow card) 12'; Gabriel Silva 17' 53'	(LIB) (LIBMS)	Dušan Mijic (yellow card) 48'	Stadium: Kanjuruhan Stadium; Attendance: 2096; Referee: Mustafa Kamal

22 April 2026 29	Persis Solo	2-1	Bhayangkara Presisi	Surakarta, Central Java
15:30 UTC+7	Dušan Mijic (yellow card) 1'; Dimitri Lima 31'; Luka Dumančić 45+5'; Bruno Gomes (yellow card) 58'; Kadek Raditya (yellow card) 76'	(LIB) (LIBMS)	Moussa Sidibé 3'; Firza Andika (yellow card) 90+6'	Stadium: Manahan Stadium; Attendance: 0 Referee: M. Erfan Efendi

27 April 2026 30	Persija Jakarta	4-0	Persis Solo	Central Jakarta, Jakarta
19:00 UTC+7	Paulo Ricardo (yellow card) 51' (goal) 81'; Allano 52'; Jean Mota 63'; Gustavo Almeida 90+1'	(LIB) (LIBMS)		Stadium: Gelora Bung Karno Stadium; Attendance: 12827; Referee: Candra

2 May 2026 31	Malut United	5-2	Persis Solo	Semarang, Central Java
19:00 UTC+7	David da Silva 19' 40' 45+2'; Gustavo França (red card) 31'; Nilson Júnior 50'; Yakob Sayuri 69'; Abduh Lestaluhu (yellow card) 85'	(LIB) (LIBMS)	Bruno Gomes 15'; Arkhan Kaka 78'; Miroslav Maričić (yellow card) 81'	Stadium: Jatidiri Stadium; Attendance: 0 Referee: Naufal Adya Fairuski

9 May 2026 32	Persis Solo	0-0	Persebaya Surabaya	Surakarta, Central Java
19:00 UTC+7	Zanadin Fariz (yellow card) 25'; Dejan Tumbas (yellow card) 30'	(LIB) (LIBMS)	Mikael Tata (yellow card) 90+4'	Stadium: Manahan Stadium; Attendance: 7941; Referee: Yudi Nurcahya

16 May 2026 33	Persis Solo	1-0	Dewa United	Surakarta, Central Java
19:00 UTC+7	Luka Dumančić 76'; Ikhwan Tanamal (yellow card) 90'; Jefferson Carioca (yellow card) 90+2'	(LIB) (LIBMS)	Damion Lowe (yellow card) 40'; Ricky Kambuaya (yellow card) 57'; Alta Ballah (yellow card) 57'; Nick Kuipers (yellow card) 65'	Stadium: Manahan Stadium; Attendance: 9939; Referee: Thoriq Alkatiri

23 May 2026 34	Persita Tangerang	1-3	Persis Solo	Serang, Banten
16:00 UTC+7	Tamirlan Kozubayev (yellow card) 29'; Pablo Ganet 90'; Jack Brown (yellow card) 90+5'	(LIB) (LIBMS)	Alfriyanto Nico (yellow card) 6'; Jefferson Carioca 44'; Miroslav Maričić 74'; Dejan Tumbas 90+2'	Stadium: Banten International Stadium; Attendance: 0 Referee: Yudai Yamamoto

==== League standing ====
Pos	Team	Pld	W	D	L	GF	GA	GD	Pts	Qualification or relegation
14	Madura United	34	9	8	17	37	54	−17	35	
15	PSM	34	8	10	16	39	49	−10	34 (Note: Head-to-head points: PSM 4, Persis 1)	
16	Persis (R)	34	8	10	16	39	59	−20	34	Relegation to the Championship
17	Semen Padang (R)	34	5	5	24	22	65	−43	20	Relegation to the Championship
18	PSBS (R)	34	4	6	24	31	95	−64	18	Relegation to the Championship

Source: Super League 2025–26
Rules for classification: 1) Points; 2) Head-to-head points; 3) Head-to-head goal difference; 4) Head-to-head goals scored; 5) Goal difference; 6) Goals scored; 7) Fair-play points; 8) Draw.
(R) Relegated

== Statistics ==
=== Appearances and goals ===
Players with no appearances are not included on the list.

No.	Pos	Nat	Player	Total		Super League		Piala Indonesia	
No.	Pos	Nat	Player	Apps	Goals	Apps	Goals	Apps	Goals
1	GK	(Indonesia) IDN	Muhammad Riyandi	23	0	22+1	0	0	0
4	FW	(Liberia) LBR	Abu Kamara	2	0	0+2	0	0	0
5	MF	(Brazil) BRA	Andrei Alba	14	0	12+2	0	0	0
6	DF	(Croatia) CRO	Luka Dumančić	14	2	14	2	0	0
7	FW	(Indonesia) IDN	Irfan Jauhari	19	1	7+12	1	0	0
8	FW	(Indonesia) IDN	Arkhan Kaka	17	1	0+17	1	0	0
9	FW	(Brazil) BRA	Bruno Gomes	11	4	11	4	0	0
10	MF	(Brazil) BRA	Dimitri Lima	13	1	7+6	1	0	0
11	MF	(Indonesia) IDN	Yabes Roni	5	0	3+2	0	0	0
13	DF	(Indonesia) IDN	Dodi Alekvan Djin	11	0	5+6	0	0	0
18	FW	(Indonesia) IDN	Febri Hariyadi	1	0	0+1	0	0	0
19	FW	(Serbia) SRB	Dejan Tumbas	13	2	10+3	2	0	0
22	MF	(Indonesia) IDN	Sutanto Tan	22	0	11+11	0	0	0
29	DF	(Indonesia) IDN	Faqih Maulana	2	0	0+2	0	0	0
30	DF	(Indonesia) IDN	Eky Taufik	13	0	9+4	0	0	0
32	DF	(Indonesia) IDN	Kadek Raditya	16	0	14+2	0	0	0
36	FW	(Indonesia) IDN	Althaf Indie	29	0	15+14	0	0	0
40	FW	(Indonesia) IDN	Ikhwan Tanamal	13	0	6+7	0	0	0
44	DF	(Serbia) SRB	Dušan Mijic	16	1	16	1	0	0
47	DF	(Indonesia) IDN	Agung Mannan	6	0	2+4	0	0	0
54	GK	(Serbia) SRB	Vukašin Vraneš	9	0	8+1	0	0	0
56	DF	(Indonesia) IDN	Alfriyanto Nico	10	0	7+3	0	0	0
77	FW	(Brazil) BRA	Jefferson Carioca	4	0	1+3	0	0	0
78	FW	(Indonesia) IDN	Zanadin Fariz	28	1	24+4	1	0	0
88	MF	(Serbia) SRB	Miroslav Maričić	15	1	14+1	1	0	0
97	FW	(Indonesia) IDN	Septian Bagaskara	7	0	0+7	0	0	0
99	FW	(Ukraine) UKR	Roman Paparyha	13	4	11+2	4	0	0
Player who featured but departed the club during the season:
4	DF	(Netherlands) NED	Xandro Schenk	17	2	17	2	0	0
5	DF	(Netherlands) NED	Jordy Tutuarima	12	1	12	1	0	0
6	MF	(Republic of Ireland) IRL	Fuad Sule	5	0	5	0	0	0
9	FW	(Curaçao) CUW	Gervane Kastaneer	13	4	13	4	0	0
10	FW	(Japan) JPN	Kodai Tanaka	19	7	19	7	0	0
11	MF	(Indonesia) IDN	Sidik Saimima	7	0	4+3	0	0	0
14	MF	(Japan) JPN	Sho Yamamoto	15	2	15	2	0	0
15	DF	(Indonesia) IDN	Giovani Numberi	16	0	14+2	0	0	0
18	FW	(Indonesia) IDN	Arapenta Poerba	11	0	5+6	0	0	0
19	DF	(Brazil) BRA	Cleylton	15	2	15	2	0	0
31	GK	(Indonesia) IDN	Gianluca Pandeynuwu	3	0	3	0	0	0
37	FW	(Singapore) SGP	Zulfahmi Arifin	6	0	2+4	0	0	0
77	FW	(Brazil) BRA	Adriano Castanheira	12	0	10+2	0	0	0
