= 2024–25 Persis Solo season =

Persis Solo football club season review 2024–25

Persis Solo
2024-25 season
- Owner: PT Persis Solo Saestu
- President: Kaesang Pangarep
- Coach: (Bosnia and Herzegovina) Milomir Šešlija (until 7 October 2024) (Indonesia) Yogie Nugraha (Caretaker) (Malaysia) Ong Kim Swee (from 25 November 2024)
- Stadium: Manahan Stadium
- Liga 1: 14th
- Top goalscorer: Moussa Sidibé (8)

The 2024-25 season was Persis Solo's 101st season in existence and its 3rd consecutive season in the top flight of Indonesian football following its promotion from Liga 2 in 2021.

On 27 September 2024, Persis Solo announced to retain Milomir Šešlija for the 2024/2025 season, following his successful spell in Persis Solo's previous season.

Persis Solo had a poor run at the start of the Liga 1 season. Milomir Seslija's team had already suffered five defeats out of their first six matches.

Milomir's contract was eventually terminated on 7 October 2024 with a club statement citing the teams' poor performance during the start of the season as one of the key factors behind the decision to make a managerial change.

He was replaced by caretaker Yogie Nugraha until 25 November 2024, when a new head coach, Ong Kim Swee, was hired until the end of the season.

After struggling in the relegation zone from November 2024 to February 2025, a crucial away win against Borneo Samarinda on 2 March 2025 lifted them out of relegation zone.

Coach Ong finally took Persis finished 14th in the league final standing with 36 points. They avoided relegation by two place and 2 points.

== Squad ==
Denotes player who left the club during mid season

No.	Player	Nationality	Date of birth (age)	Previous club	Notes
Goalkeepers
1	Muhammad Riyandi	(Indonesia)	3 January 2000 (age 26)	(Indonesia) Barito Putera	
31	Gianluca Pandeynuwu	(Indonesia)	9 November 1997 (age 28)	(Indonesia) Borneo Samarinda	
47	I Gede Aditya	(Indonesia)	4 July 2004 (age 21)	(Indonesia) Persis U-20	
51	Pancar Nur Widiastono	(Indonesia)	5 April 2004 (age 21)	(Indonesia) Persija U-20	
Defenders
2	Mochammad Zaenuri	(Indonesia)	10 June 1995 (age 30)	(Indonesia) Persebaya Surabaya	
3	Eduardo Kunde (capt.)	(Brazil)	17 September 1997 (age 28)	(Bulgaria) Botev Vratsa	
15	Giovani Numberi	(Indonesia)	22 April 2000 (age 25)	(Indonesia) PSIS Semarang	
16	Rizky Dwi Febrianto	(Indonesia)	22 February 1997 (age 28)	(Indonesia) Arema F.C.	
26	Rian Miziar	(Indonesia)	13 October 1990 (age 35)	(Indonesia) Muba Babel United	
29	Gardhika Arya	(Indonesia)	8 August 2000 (age 25)	(Indonesia) Gresik United	
30	Eky Taufik	(Indonesia)	15 February 1991 (age 34)	(Indonesia) Persela Lamongan	
34	Jordy Tutuarima	(Netherlands)	28 April 1993 (age 32)	(Armenia) FC Noah	Joined in January 2025
70	Cleylton	(Brazil)	19 March 1993 (age 32)	(Malaysia) Kedah Darul Aman	Joined in January 2025
44	Ricardo Lima (Note: Back to Brazil to undergo ACL reconstruction surgery.)	(Brazil)	20 February 1994 (age 31)	(Bulgaria) Floresta	Season ending injury
-	Faqih Maulana	(Indonesia)	11 September 2004 (age 21)	(Indonesia) Persis U-20	Loaned out to PSIS Semarang
-	Marcell Rumkabu	(Indonesia)	9 February 2005 (age 20)	(Indonesia) Persipura	Loaned out to PSKC Cimahi
Midfielders
6	Abdul Aziz	(Indonesia)	14 February 1994 (age 31)	(Indonesia) Persib Bandung	On loan from Persib Bandung
14	Sho Yamamoto	(Japan)	12 November 1996 (age 29)	(Indonesia) Persebaya Surabaya	
20	Lautaro Belleggia	(Argentina)	21 March 1997 (age 28)	(Argentina) Güemes	Joined in January 2025
22	Sutanto Tan	(Indonesia)	4 May 1994 (age 31)	(Indonesia) PSM Makassar	
28	Braif Fatari	(Indonesia)	9 April 2002 (age 23)	(Indonesia) Nusantara United	
63	Ripal Wahyudi	(Indonesia)	10 October 2000 (age 25)	(Indonesia) Persebaya Surabaya	
78	Zanadin Fariz	(Indonesia)	31 May 2004 (age 21)	(Indonesia) Persis U-20	
20	Gonzalo Andrada	(Uruguay)	4 July 1997 (age 28)	(Uruguay) C.A. Progreso	Released in January 2025
Forwards
7	Irfan Jauhari	(Indonesia)	31 January 2001 (age 24)	(Indonesia) Bali United	
8	Arkhan Kaka	(Indonesia)	2 September 2007 (age 18)	(Indonesia) Persis U-20	
9	Ramadhan Sananta	(Indonesia)	5 March 2003 (age 22)	(Indonesia) PSM Makassar	
21	Romadona	(Indonesia)	27 November 2002 (age 23)	(Indonesia) Persis U-20	
25	Moussa Sidibé	(Mali)	21 November 1994 (age 31)	(Indonesia) Johor Darul Ta'zim F.C.	
35	Jhon Cley	(Brazil)	9 March 1994 (age 31)	(Indonesia) Bekasi City	Joined in January 2025
36	Althaf Indie	(Indonesia)	6 January 2003 (age 23)	(Indonesia) Persis U-20	
10	Karim Rossi	(Switzerland)	1 May 1994 (age 31)	(Cyprus) Karmiotissa FC	Released in February 2025
11	Facundo Aranda	(Argentina)	18 March 2000 (age 25)	(Montenegro) FK Jezero	Released in January 2025

== Coaching staff ==
Position	Name
Head coach	(Malaysia) Ong Kim Swee
Assistant coach	(Spain) Juan Torres Garrido
Assistant coach	(Indonesia) Tithan Suryata
Goalkeeper coach	(Indonesia) Eddy Harto
Assistant goalkeeper coach	(Indonesia) Rizki Arya Adinata
Fitness coach	(Spain) Oscar Balaguer
Analyst	(Indonesia) Taufik Novianto
Team Doctor	(Indonesia) dr. Iwan Utomo
Physiotherapist	(Indonesia) Rudi Suseno
Physiotherapist	(Indonesia) Deka Bagus Kurniagung
Masseur	(Indonesia) Fernando Nugroho

== Transfers ==
=== Pre-season Transfer ===
==== In ====
Date	Position	Player	From	Ref
29 June 2024	DF	(Indonesia) Rizky Dwi Febrianto	(Indonesia) Arema F.C.	
1 July 2024	MF	(Indonesia) Ripal Wahyudi	(Indonesia) Persebaya Surabaya	
1 July 2024	DF	(Indonesia) Mochammad Zaenuri	(Indonesia) Dewa United	
2 July 2024	DF	(Indonesia) Giovani Numberi	(Indonesia) Dewa United	
7 July 2024	FW	(Switzerland) Karim Rossi	(Cyprus) Karmiotissa FC	
10 July 2024	DF	(Indonesia) Marcell Rumkabu	(Indonesia) Persipura	
17 July 2024	DF	(Brazil) Ricardo Lima	(Brazil) Floresta	
18 July 2024	FW	(Indonesia) Fransiskus Alesandro	(Indonesia) Sriwijaya F.C.	
19 July 2024	MF	(Indonesia) Braif Fatari	(Indonesia) Nusantara Lampung F.C.	
19 July 2024	DF	(Brazil) Eduardo Kunde	(Bulgaria) Botev Vratsa	
22 July 2024	FW	(Argentina) Facundo Aranda	(Montenegro) FK Jezero	
22 July 2024	MF	(Uruguay) Gonzalo Andrada	(Uruguay) C.A. Progreso	
27 July 2024	DF	(Indonesia) Gardhika Arya	(Indonesia) Gresik United	

==== Loan in ====
Date	Position	Player	Loaned From	Ref
15 August 2024	MF	(Indonesia) Abdul Aziz	(Indonesia) Persib Bandung	

==== Out ====
Position	Player	To	Ref
FW	(Argentina) Alexis Messidoro	(Indonesia) Dewa United	
FW	(Spain) Roni	(Spain) Zamora CF	
FW	(Indonesia) Arapenta Poerba	(Indonesia) Dewa United	
DF	(Brazil) Jaime Xavier	(Indonesia) PSBS Biak	
MF	(Indonesia) Chrystna Bhagascara	(Indonesia) Persekat Tegal	
MF	(Indonesia) Kanu Helmiawan	(Indonesia) PSMS Medan	
DF	(Indonesia) Marcell Januar	(Indonesia) Persikota Tangerang	
DF	(Philippines) Diego Bardanca	(Hong Kong) Kitchee SC	
DF	(Indonesia) Gavin Kwan Adsit	(Indonesia) Borneo Samarinda	
MF	(Indonesia) Shulton Fajar	(Indonesia) Arema Malang	
MF	(Indonesia) Taufiq Febriyanto	(Indonesia) Bhayangkara F.C.	
DF	(Indonesia) Alfath Fathier	(Indonesia) Bekasi City	
DF	(Indonesia) Arif Budiyono	(Indonesia) Semen Padang	
DF	(Indonesia) Samuel Simanjuntak	(Indonesia) PSIM Yogyakarta	
MF	(Indonesia) Arif Agung	(Indonesia) Bekasi City	
MF	(Indonesia) Rifqi Ray	(Indonesia) Persik Kediri	
DF	(Indonesia) Fajar Zainul	(Indonesia) Persikota Tangerang	
GK	(Indonesia) Nuri Agus Wibowo	(Indonesia) Madura United	
MF	(Indonesia) Wahyu Agung	(Indonesia) Gresik United	

==== Loan out ====
Position	Player	Loaned to	Ref
GK	(Indonesia) Erlangga Setyo	(Indonesia) PSPS Pekanbaru	

=== Mid-season Transfer ===
==== In ====
Date	Position	Player	From	Ref
6 January 2025	DF	(Brazil) Cleylton	(Malaysia) Kedah Darul Aman	
9 January 2025	MF	(Argentina) Lautaro Belleggia	(Argentina) Güemes	
11 January 2025	DF	(Netherlands) Jordy Tutuarima	(Armenia) FC Noah	
15 January 2025	FW	(Brazil) Jhon Cley	(Indonesia) Bekasi City	
15 January 2025	MF	(Indonesia) Brylian Aldama	(Laos) Young Elephants	

==== Out ====
Date	Position	Player	To	Ref
20 February 2025	FW	(Switzerland) Karim Rossi	(Switzerland) FC Schaffhausen	
15 January 2025	MF	(Uruguay) Gonzalo Andrada	(Uruguay) Atenas	
15 January 2025	FW	(Argentina) Facundo Aranda	Free agent	

==== Loan out ====
Date	Position	Player	Loaned to	Ref
15 January 2025	DF	(Indonesia) Faqih Maulana	(Indonesia) PSIS Semarang	
15 January 2025	MF	(Indonesia) Brylian Aldama	(Indonesia) Persela Lamongan	
10 January 2025	DF	(Indonesia) Marcell Rumkabu	(Indonesia) PSKC Cimahi	

== Competitions ==
=== Super League ===
==== Results by matchday ====
Matchday	1	2	3	4	5	6	7	8	9	10	11	12	13	14	15	16	17	18	19	20	21	22	23	24	25	26	27	28	29	30	31	32	33	34
Ground	A	H	A	H	A	H	A	H	A	H	A	H	A	A	H	A	H	H	A	H	A	H	A	H	A	H	A	H	A	H	H	A	H	A
Result	L	L	L	W	L	L	D	W	L	L	L	D	L	D	D	L	L	L	W	D	L	W	D	D	W	D	W	L	W	W	L	W	D	L
Position	16	17	17	13	15	15	15	15	15	16	16	16	16	17	16	16	16	18	16	17	18	16	18	18	15	16	15	15	14	14	14	13	13	14

Updated to match(es) played on 11 August 2025. Source: Matches
A = Away; H = Home; W = Win; D = Draw; L = Loss; P = Postponed

==== Matches ====
Win Draw Loss

10 August 2024 1	PSM Makassar	3-0	Persis Solo	Balikpapan
15:30 UTC+7				Stadium: Batakan Stadium; Attendance: 1536

17 August 2024 2	Persis Solo	0-1	PSIS Semarang	Surakarta
19:00 UTC+7				Stadium: Manahan Stadium

24 August 2024 3	Persija Jakarta	2-1	Persis Solo	North Jakarta
15:30 UTC+7		[Report (LIB)] [Report (LIBMS)]		Stadium: Jakarta International Stadium

13 September 2024 4	Persis Solo	4-0	Madura United	Surakarta
15:30 UTC+7		[Report (LIB)] [Report (LIBMS)]		Stadium: Manahan Stadium

18 September 2024 5	Persebaya Surabaya	2-1	Persis Solo	Surabaya
19:00 UTC+7		[Report (LIB)] [Report (LIBMS)]		Stadium: Gelora Bung Tomo Stadium

23 September 2024 6	Persis Solo	0-1	Persik Kediri	Surakarta
19:00 UTC+7		[report (LIB)] [report (ILMS)]		Stadium: Manahan Stadium

29 September 2024 7	Semen Padang F.C.	0-0	Persis Solo	Padang
15:30 UTC+7		[report (LIB)] [report (LIBMS)]		Stadium: Gelora Haji Agus Salim

19 October 2024 8	Persis Solo	3-2	Borneo F.C. Samarinda	Surakarta
19:00 UTC+7		[Report (LIB)] [Report (LIBMS)]		Stadium: Manahan Stadium

27 October 2024 9	Bali United	3-0	Persis Solo	Gianyar
19:00 UTC+7		[Report (LIB)] [Report (LIBMS)]		Stadium: Kapten I Wayan Dipta Stadium

3 November 2024 10	Persis Solo	0-2	PSS Sleman	Surakarta
19:00 UTC+7		[Report (LIB)] [Report (LIBMS)]		Stadium: Manahan Stadium

21 November 2024 11	Malut United	3-0	Persis Solo	Ternate
15:30 UTC+7		[Report (LIB)] [Report (LIBMS)]		Stadium: Gelora Kie Raha Stadium

3 December 2024 12	Persis Solo	0-0	Barito Putera	Surakarta
19:00 UTC+7		[Report (LIB)] [Report (LIBMS)]		Stadium: Manahan Stadium

9 December 2024 13	Persita Tangerang	2-0	Persis Solo	Cibinong
19:00 UTC+7		[Report (LIB)] [Report (LIBMS)]		Stadium: Pakansari Stadium

12 December 2024 14	Arema Malang	1-1	Persis Solo	Blitar
19:00 UTC+7		[Report (LIB)] [Report (LIBMS)]		Stadium: Gelora Supriyadi Stadium

16 December 2024 15	Persis Solo	1-1	PSBS Biak	Surakarta
19:00 UTC+7		[Report (LIB)] [Report (LIBMS)]		Stadium: Manahan Stadium

21 December 2024 16	Dewa United	2-0	Persis Solo	Cibinong
19:00 UTC+7		[Report (LIB)] [Report (LIBMS)]		Stadium: Pakansari Stadium

29 December 2024 17	Persis Solo	0-1	Persib Bandung	Surakarta
19:00 UTC+7		[Report (LIB)] [Report (LIBMS)]		Stadium: Manahan Stadium

13 January 2025 18	Persis Solo	0-1	PSM Makassar	Surakarta
19:00 UTC+7				Stadium: Manahan Stadium

20 January 2025 19	PSIS Semarang	1-2	Persis Solo	Semarang
19:00 UTC+7		[Report (LIB)] [Report (LIBMS)]		Stadium: Jatidiri Stadium

26 January 2025 20	Persis Solo	3-3	Persija Jakarta	Surakarta
19:00 UTC+7				Stadium: Manahan Stadium

1 February 2025 21	Madura United	2-0	Persis Solo	Bangkalan
15:30 UTC+7		[Report (LIB)] [Report (LIBMS)]		Stadium: Gelora Bangkalan Stadium

7 February 2025 22	Persis Solo	2-1	Persebaya Surabaya	Surakarta
19:00 UTC+7				Stadium: Manahan Stadium

14 February 2025 23	Persik Kediri	0-0	Persis Solo	Kediri
15:30 UTC+7		[Report (LIB)] [Report (LIBMS)]		Stadium: Brawijaya Stadium

21 February 2025 24	Persis Solo	1-1	Semen Padang	Surakarta
15:30 UTC+7				Stadium: Manahan Stadium

2 March 2025 25	Borneo Samarinda	0-1	Persis Solo	Samarinda
20:30 UTC+7		(LIB) (LIBMS)		Stadium: Segiri Stadium; Attendance: 8518; Referee: Muhammad Tri Santoso

6 March 2025 26	Persis Solo	2-2	Bali United	Surakarta
20:30 UTC+7				Stadium: Manahan Stadium

11 March 2025 27	PSS Sleman	1-4	Persis Solo	Semarang
20:30 UTC+7		(LIB) (LIBMS)		Stadium: Jatidiri Stadium; Attendance: 0 Referee: Ginanjar Rahman Latief

12 April 2025 28	Persis Solo	1-3	Malut United	Surakarta
15:30 UTC+7		(LIB) https://assets.ligaindonesiabaru.com/uploads/document/matchsum/PERSIS%20SOLO_VS_MALUT%20UNITED%20FC_20250412_MjQwNzA3NzAw.pdf (LIBMS)]		Stadium: Manahan Stadium; Attendance: 6063

19 April 2025 29	Barito Putera	0-1	Persis Solo	Banjar
19:00 UTC+7		(LIB) (LIBMS)		Stadium: Demang Lehman Stadium

27 April 2025 30	Persis Solo	1-0	Persita Tangerang	Surakarta
15:30 UTC+7		(LIB)		Stadium: Manahan Stadium

5 May 2025 31	Persis Solo	0-1	Arema Malang	Surakarta
19:00 UTC+7		[(LIB)]		Stadium: Manahan Stadium

11 May 2025 32	PSBS Biak	0-2	Persis Solo	Jayapura
15:30 UTC+7		[(LIB)]		Stadium: Lukas Enembe Stadium

17 May 2025 33	Persis Solo	1-1	Dewa United	Surakarta
19:00 UTC+7		[(LIB)]		Stadium: Manahan Stadium

24 May 2025 34	Persib Bandung	3-2	Persis Solo	Bandung
16:00 UTC+7		[(LIB)]		Stadium: Gelora Bandung Lautan Api Stadium

==== League Table ====
Pos	Team	Pld	W	D	L	GF	GA	GD	Pts	Qualification or relegation
12	Persik	34	10	11	13	40	42	−2	41	
13	Semen Padang	34	9	9	16	38	60	−22	36 (Note: Ranked on head-to-head points: Semen Padang 8, Persis 5, Madura United 3.)	
14	Persis	34	9	9	16	34	46	−12	36	
15	Madura United	34	10	6	18	36	58	−22	36	
16	PSS (Note: PSS was deducted three points by the PSSI Disciplinary Committee due to the match fixing case in the 2018 Liga 2.) (R)	34	11	4	19	43	50	−7	34 (Note: Tied on head-to-head points. Ranked on head-to-head goal differences: PSS +2, Barito Putera –2.)	Relegation to the 2025–26 Championship

Source: Liga 1 2024–25
Rules for classification: 1) Points; 2) Head-to-head points; 3) Head-to-head goal difference; 4) Head-to-head goals scored; 5) Goal difference; 6) Goals scored; 7) Fair-play points; 8) Drawing of lots.
(R) Relegated
