= 2021 Liga 2 (Indonesia) final =

2021 Liga 2 final
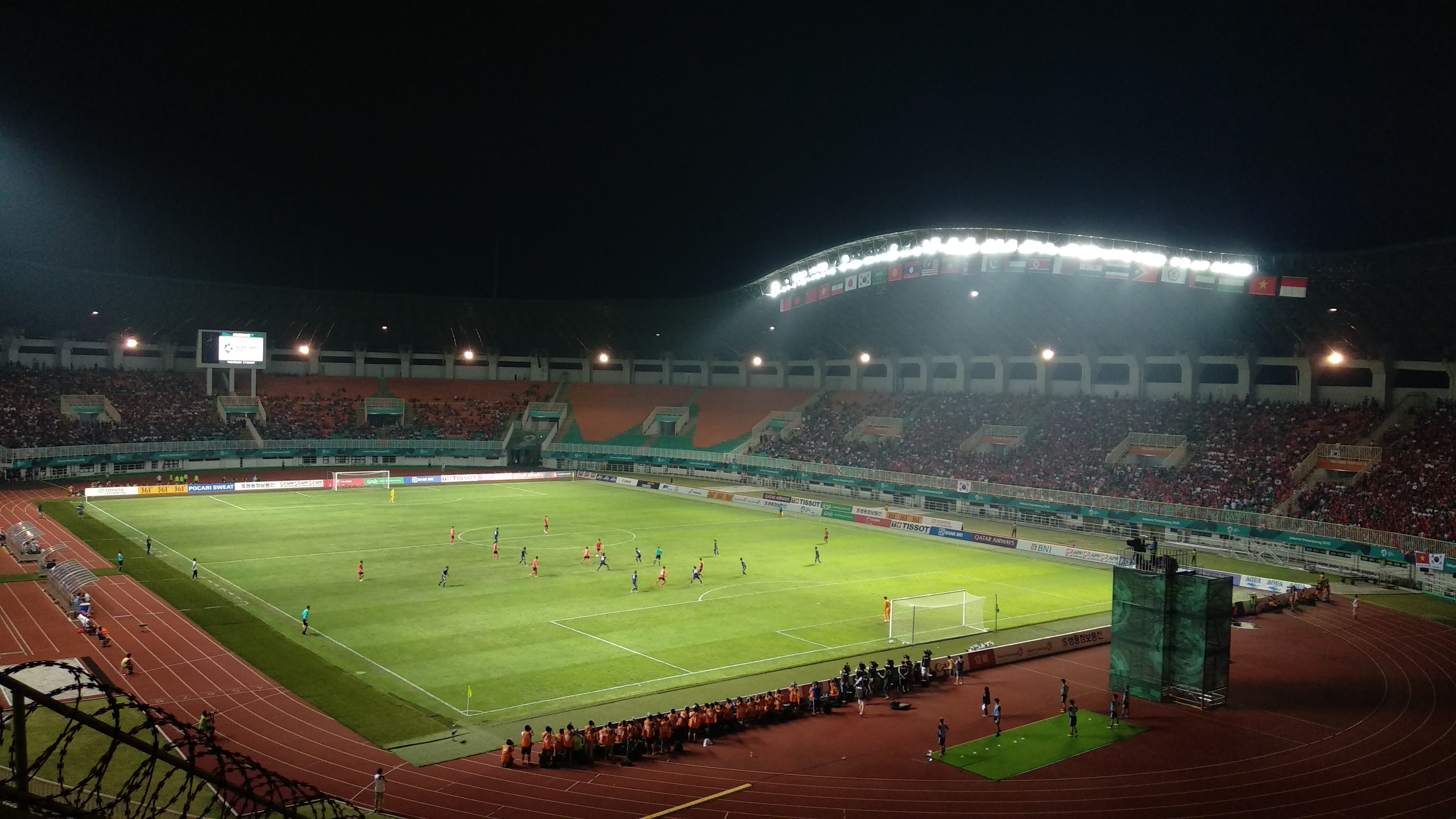
- The Pakansari in Cibinong hosted the final
- Event: 2021 Liga 2
RANS Cilegon	Persis
1	2
- Date: 30 December 2021
- Venue: Pakansari Stadium, Cibinong
- Referee: Yudi Nurcahya
- Attendance: 0 (Note: Played behind closed doors due to the COVID-19 pandemic in Indonesia)

The 2021 Liga 2 final was the final match of the 2021–22 Liga 2, the 12th season of second-tier competition in Indonesia organised by PT Liga Indonesia Baru, and the fourth season since it was renamed from the Liga Indonesia Premier Division to the Liga 2. It was played at the Pakansari Stadium in Cibinong, Bogor, West Java on 30 December 2021.

Persis won the match 2–1 to secure their first title in this competition.

== Road to the final ==
Note: In all results below, the score of the finalist is given first (H: home; A: away).

RANS Cilegon		Round	Persis	
Group B runners-up: Pos / Team / Pld / Pts; 1 / Dewa United / 10 / 22; 2 / RANS Cilegon / 10 / 20; 3 / Persekat / 10 / 20; 4 / Perserang / 10 / 13; 5 / PSKC / 10 / 7; 6 / Badak Lampung (R) / 10 / 4; Source: Liga 2 2021 (R) Relegated		First round	Group C winners: Pos / Team / Pld / Pts; 1 / Persis / 10 / 20; 2 / PSIM / 10 / 19; 3 / PSCS / 10 / 16; 4 / Persijap / 10 / 12; 5 / PSG Pati / 10 / 5; 6 / Hizbul Wathan (R) / 10 / 4; Source: Liga 2 2021 (R) Relegated	
Group X winners: Pos / Team / Pld / Pts; 1 / RANS Cilegon / 3 / 7; 2 / Persis / 3 / 6; 3 / Sriwijaya / 3 / 4; 4 / Persiba / 3 / 0; Source: Liga 2 2021		Second round	Group X runners-up: Pos / Team / Pld / Pts; 1 / RANS Cilegon / 3 / 7; 2 / Persis / 3 / 6; 3 / Sriwijaya / 3 / 4; 4 / Persiba / 3 / 0; Source: Liga 2 2021	
Opponent	Score	Knockout round	Opponent	Score
PSIM	3–0	Semi-finals	Dewa United	2–1

== Match ==
Times listed below are UTC+7.

=== Details ===
30 December 2021
21:00

RANS Cilegon	1–2	Persis
Tuasalamony 56' (pen.)	Report	Bachdim 40', 46'

Pakansari Stadium, Cibinong
Attendance: 0
Referee: Yudi Nurcahya

GK	96	(Indonesia) Kurniawan Ajie
DF	24	(Indonesia) Hamdan Zamzani
DF	23	(Indonesia) Hamka Hamzah		(substituted off) 30'
DF	13	(Indonesia) Kurniawan Karman	(yellow card) 60'	(substituted off) 85'
DF	5	(Indonesia) Saddam Hi Tenang
MF	15	(Indonesia) Fadilla Akbar
MF	90	(Indonesia) Alfin Tuasalamony		(substituted off) 85'
MF	12	(Indonesia) Jujun Junaidi		(substituted off) 74'
MF	44	(Indonesia) Bima Ragil		(substituted off) 74'
MF	22	(Indonesia) Rifal Lastori
FW	10	(Indonesia) Cristian Gonzalez
Substitutes:
GK	98	(Indonesia) Wahyudi
DF	3	(Indonesia) Anan Lestaluhu
DF	2	(Indonesia) Hendra Wijaya		(substituted in) 30'
MF	8	(Indonesia) Agung Pribadi		(substituted in) 85'
MF	89	(Indonesia) Sansan Fauzi		(substituted in) 85'
FW	88	(Indonesia) Ikhsan Zikrak		(substituted in) 74'
FW	50	(Indonesia) Chandra Waskito		(substituted in) 74'
Manager:
(Indonesia) Rahmad Darmawan

GK	62	(Indonesia) Harlan Suardi
DF	30	(Indonesia) Eky Taufik		(substituted off) 66'
DF	22	(Indonesia) Arif Budiyono
DF	15	(Indonesia) Fabiano Beltrame
DF	96	(Indonesia) Abduh Lestaluhu	(yellow card) 60'
MF	16	(Indonesia) Chrystna Bhagascara		(substituted off) 83'
MF	87	(Indonesia) Sulthon Fajar	(yellow card) 12'
MF	29	(Indonesia) Sandi Sute		(substituted off) 66'
FW	10	(Indonesia) Irfan Bachdim		(substituted off) 66'
FW	9	(Indonesia) Beto Gonçalves
FW	94	(Indonesia) Heri Susanto		(substituted off) 46'
Substitutes:
GK	1	(Indonesia) Wahyu Tri Nugroho
DF	3	(Indonesia) Eriyanto		(substituted in) 66'
DF	26	(Indonesia) Rian Miziar
MF	18	(Indonesia) Arapenta Poerba		(substituted in) 66'
MF	14	(Indonesia) Miftahul Hamdi		(substituted in) 66'
FW	7	(Indonesia) Irfan Jauhari		(substituted in) 46'
FW	6	(Indonesia) Ferdinand Sinaga		(substituted in) 83'
Manager:
(Indonesia) Eko Purdjianto

Man of the Match:
???

Assistant referees:
???
???
Fourth official:
???

Match rules

- 90 minutes.
- 30 minutes of extra time if necessary.
- Penalty shoot-out if scores still level.
- Seven named substitutes, of which up to three may be used.
