= Numberi =

Numberi is a Papuan surname. Notable people with the surname include:

- Freddy Numberi (born 1947), Indonesian navy admiral and politician
- Giovani Numberi (born 2000), Indonesian professional footballer
- Theo Numberi (born 2001), Indonesian professional footballer
