= Andrei Alba =

Brazilian footballer (born 1995)

Personal information
- Full name: Andrei Alba
- Date of birth: 14 January 1995 (age 31)
- Place of birth: Engenho Velho, Brazil
- Height: 1.81 m (5 ft 11 1/2 in)
- Position: Defensive midfielder

Team information
- Current team: Persis Solo
- Number: 5

Youth career
- 2008–2010: Grêmio
- 2011: Cerâmica
- 2012: Santiago
- 2013: Fragata
- 2013–2015: Chapecoense

Senior career*
Years	Team	Apps	(Gls)
2016–2017	Chapecoense	3	(0)
2016	→ Concórdia (loan)	10	(0)
2017	→ Concórdia (loan)	15	(2)
2017	Operário	0	(0)
2018	Concórdia	8	(1)
2018	Marcílio Dias	15	(1)
2019	Real Brasília	15	(2)
2019	→ Sobradinho (loan)	5	(0)
2020–2021	SE Gama	26	(1)
2021–2022	Hercílio Luz FC	5	(0)
2023	Operário MS	5	(0)
2023–2024	Erzeni	27	(0)
2024–2026	SC Delhi	20	(3)
2026–	Persis Solo	9	(0)
- * Club domestic league appearances and goals as of 22:30, 18 April 2026 (UTC)

Andrei Alba (born 14 January 1995) is a Brazilian professional footballer who plays as a defensive midfielder for Super League club Persis Solo.

== Club career ==
Born in Engenho Velho, Rio Grande do Sul, Alba was a Chapecoense youth graduate. On 25 January 2016, shortly after being promoted to the first team, he signed a new contract with the club running until 2018.

Alba made his senior debut on 14 February 2016, coming on as a second-half substitute for Josimar in a 2–0 Campeonato Catarinense away win against Brusque. His Série A debut came on 4 June, as he replaced injured Moisés Ribeiro in a 0–0 home draw against Fluminense.

On 21 July 2016, Alba was loaned to Concórdia until the end of the year. Returning to Chape in January 2017 after contributing with 16 matches, he suffered a serious knee injury, being sidelined for several months.

== Career statistics ==
As of 8 April 2017

Club	Season	League			State League		Cup		Continental		Other		Total	
Club	Season	Division	Apps	Goals	Apps	Goals	Apps	Goals	Apps	Goals	Apps	Goals	Apps	Goals
Chapecoense	2016	Série A	1	0	2	0	0	0	—		—		3	0
Chapecoense	2017	Série A	0	0	0	0	0	0	—		—		0	0
Chapecoense	Total		1	0	2	0	0	0	—		—		3	0
Concórdia (loan)	2016	Catarinense Série B	—		16	0	—		—		—		16	0
Career total			1	0	18	0	0	0	0	0	0	0	19	0
