= Gonzalo Andrada =

Uruguayan football player (born 1997)

Personal information
- Full name: Gonzalo Sebastián Andrada Acosta
- Date of birth: 4 July 1997 (age 29)
- Place of birth: Montevideo, Uruguay
- Height: 1.74 m (5 ft 9 in)
- Position: Defensive midfielder

Team information
- Current team: Atenas
- Number: 24

Senior career*
Years	Team	Apps	(Gls)
2018	Fénix	0	(0)
2019–2021	Progreso	83	(1)
2022	Defensor Sporting	5	(0)
2022	Rentistas	10	(0)
2023–2024	Progreso	40	(0)
2024	Persis Solo	11	(0)
2025–	Atenas	15	(1)
- * Club domestic league appearances and goals as of 6 September 2025

Gonzalo Sebastián Andrada Acosta (born 4 July 1997) is a Uruguayan professional footballer who plays as a defensive midfielder for Uruguayan Segunda División club Atenas.

== Career ==
=== Progreso ===
In January 2019, Andrada joined Uruguayan Primera División club Progreso. He made his debut for the club on 16 February 2019, coming on as a 56th-minute substitute for Facundo Moreira in a 4-3 victory over Rampla Juniors.

== Career statistics ==
=== Club ===
As of match played 21 December 2024

Appearances and goals by club, season and competition
Club	Season	League			Cup		Continental		Other		Total	
Club	Season	Division	Apps	Goals	Apps	Goals	Apps	Goals	Apps	Goals	Apps	Goals
Fénix	2018	Uruguayan Primera División	0	0	—	—	—	—	—	—	0	0
Fénix	Total		0	0	—	—	—	—	—	—	0	0
Progreso	2019	Uruguayan Primera División	31	0	—	—	—	—	—	—	31	0
Progreso	2020	Uruguayan Primera División	24	1	—	—	2	0	—	—	26	1
Progreso	2021	Uruguayan Primera División	28	0	—	—	—	—	—	—	28	0
Progreso	Total		83	1	—	—	2	0	—	—	85	1
Defensor Sporting	2022	Uruguayan Primera División	5	0	—	—	—	—	—	—	5	0
Rentistas	2022	Uruguayan Primera División	10	0	—	—	—	—	—	—	10	0
Progreso	2023	Uruguayan Segunda División	24	0	—	—	—	—	—	—	24	0
Progreso	2024	Uruguayan Primera División	16	0	—	—	—	—	—	—	16	0
Progreso	Total		40	0	—	—	—	—	—	—	40	0
Persis Solo	2024–25	Liga 1	11	0	—	—	—	—	—	—	11	0
Career total			149	1	—	—	2	0	—	—	151	1
