= Ibrahim Sanjaya =

Indonesian footballer

Personal information
- Full name: Ibrahim Sanjaya
- Date of birth: 26 August 1997 (age 29)
- Place of birth: Waikabubak, Indonesia
- Height: 1.70 m (5 ft 7 in)
- Position: Right-back

Youth career
- 2013–2014: Persiba Balikpapan
- 2015–2016: Bhayangkara

Senior career*
Years	Team	Apps	(Gls)
2016	Persip Pekalongan	5	(0)
2017–2018	Semen Padang	25	(0)
2019–2022	Persik Kediri	49	(0)
2022–2024	PSS Sleman	39	(0)
2024–2025	Madura United	19	(0)
2025–2026	Persis Solo	0	(0)
2026	→ PSIS Semarang (loan)	7	(0)

International career
2014–2016	Indonesia U19	2	(0)
- * Club domestic league appearances and goals as of 3 May 2026

Ibrahim Sanjaya (born 26 August 1997) is an Indonesian professional footballer who plays as a right-back.

== Club career ==
=== Semen Padang ===
In 2017, Ibrahim Sanjaya signed a contract with Indonesian Liga 1 club Semen Padang. He made his league debut on 21 September 2017 in a match against Persiba Balikpapan at the Batakan Stadium, Balikpapan.

=== Persik Kediri ===
He was signed for Persik Kediri to play in Liga 2 in 2019 season. On 25 November 2019, Persik won the 2019 Liga 2 Final and promoted to Liga 1, after defeating Persita Tangerang 3–2 at the Kapten I Wayan Dipta Stadium, Gianyar.

=== PSS Sleman ===
Sanjaya was signed for PSS Sleman to play in Liga 1 in the 2022–23 season. He made his league debut on 23 August 2022 in a match against Persik Kediri at the Brawijaya Stadium, Kediri.

== International career ==
In 2016, Sanjaya represented the Indonesia U-19, in the 2016 AFF U-19 Youth Championship.

== Career statistics ==
=== Club ===
As of 3 May 2026

Club	Season	League			Cup (Note: Includes Piala Indonesia.)		Continental		Other		Total	
Club	Season	Division	Apps	Goals	Apps	Goals	Apps	Goals	Apps	Goals	Apps	Goals
Persip Pekalongan	2016	ISC B	5	0	0	0	–		0	0	5	0
Semen Padang	2017	Liga 1	4	0	0	0	–		0	0	4	0
Semen Padang	2018	Liga 2	21	0	0	0	–		0	0	21	0
Semen Padang	Total		25	0	0	0	–		0	0	25	0
Persik Kediri	2019	Liga 2	22	0	0	0	–		0	0	22	0
Persik Kediri	2020	Liga 1	3	0	0	0	–		0	0	3	0
Persik Kediri	2021–22	Liga 1	24	0	0	0	–		4 (Note: Appearances in Menpora Cup.)	0	28	0
Persik Kediri	Total		49	0	0	0	–		4	0	53	0
PSS Sleman	2022–23	Liga 1	16	0	0	0	–		0	0	16	0
PSS Sleman	2023–24	Liga 1	23	0	0	0	–		0	0	23	0
PSS Sleman	Total		39	0	0	0	–		0	0	39	0
Madura United	2024–25	Liga 1	19	0	0	0	5 (Note: Appearances in AFC Challenge League)	0	0	0	24	0
Persis Solo	2025–26	Super League	0	0	0	0	–		0	0	0	0
PSIS Semarang (loan)	2025–26	Championship	7	0	0	0	–		0	0	7	0
Career total			144	0	0	0	5	0	4	0	153	0

== Honours ==
=== Club ===
Semen Padang

- Liga 2 runner-up: 2018

Persik Kediri

- Liga 2: 2019
