= Fadilla Akbar =

Indonesian footballer (born 2001)

Personal information
- Full name: Muhamad Fadilla Akbar
- Date of birth: 8 September 2001 (age 25)
- Place of birth: Medan, Indonesia
- Height: 1.73 m (5 ft 8 in)
- Position: Defensive midfielder

Team information
- Current team: Persiraja Banda Aceh
- Number: 15

Youth career
- 2014: Medan Jaya
- 2015: Medan Utama
- 2015: Medan Sakti
- 2016–2018: PPLP Sumatra Utara
- 2018: PSMS Medan

Senior career*
Years	Team	Apps	(Gls)
2019	Medan Utama		
2020	PSDS Deli Serdang	0	(0)
2021–2024	RANS Nusantara	30	(0)
2022	→ Madura United (loan)	8	(0)
2023	→ PSIM Yogyakarta (loan)	4	(0)
2024	Persipa Pati	5	(0)
2024–	Persiraja Banda Aceh	2	(1)

International career^{‡}
2023	Indonesia U23	1	(0)
- * Club domestic league appearances and goals as of 17 February 2025 (UTC) ‡ National team caps and goals as of 16 April 2023 (UTC)

Muhamad Fadilla Akbar (born 8 September 2001) is an Indonesian professional footballer who plays as a defensive midfielder for Liga 2 club Persiraja Banda Aceh.

== Club career ==
=== RANS Cilegon ===
In 2021, Fadilla signed a contract with Indonesian Liga 2 club RANS Cilegon. He made his league debut on 28 September 2021 in a match against Dewa United at the Gelora Bung Karno Madya Stadium, Jakarta.

==== Madura United (loan) ====
On 7 January 2022, Fadilla signed a contract with Liga 1 club Madura United on loan from RANS Cilegon. He made his league debut in a 1–0 loss against PSM Makassar on 8 January 2022 as a substitute for Asep Berlian in the 63rd minute at the Kompyang Sujana Stadium, Denpasar.

== International career ==
In April 2023, Fadilla was called up to the Indonesia U22 for the training centre in preparation for 2023 SEA Games. Fadilla made his international debut on 16 April 2023 in a friendly match against Lebanon U22 at Gelora Bung Karno Stadium, Jakarta.

== Career statistics ==
=== Club ===
As of 17 February 2025

Club	Season	League			Cup		Continental		Other		Total	
Club	Season	Division	Apps	Goals	Apps	Goals	Apps	Goals	Apps	Goals	Apps	Goals
PSDS Deli Serdang	2020	Liga 3	0	0	0	0	–		0	0	0	0
RANS Nusantara	2021	Liga 2	13	0	0	0	–		0	0	13	0
RANS Nusantara	2022–23	Liga 1	14	0	0	0	–		4 (Note: Appearances in Indonesia President's Cup)	0	18	0
RANS Nusantara	2023–24	Liga 1	3	0	0	0	–		0	0	3	0
Madura United (loan)	2021–22	Liga 1	8	0	0	0	–		0	0	8	0
PSIM Yogyakarta (loan)	2023–24	Liga 2	4	0	0	0	–		0	0	4	0
Persipa Pati	2024–25	Liga 2	5	0	0	0	–		0	0	5	0
Persiraja Banda Aceh	2024–25	Liga 2	2	1	0	0	–		0	0	2	1
Career total			48	1	0	0	0	0	4	0	52	1

== Honours ==
=== Club ===
RANS Cilegon

- Liga 2 runner-up: 2021
