= José Enrique (footballer, born 1995) =

Spanish footballer (born 1995)

Personal information
- Full name: José Enrique Rodríguez
- Date of birth: 26 August 1995 (age 31)
- Place of birth: Almería, Spain
- Height: 1.86 m (6 ft 1 in)
- Position: Forward

Team information
- Current team: Persik Kediri
- Number: 21

Youth career
- 2014–2015: CP Almería
- 2015–2016: Los Molinos

Senior career*
Years	Team	Apps	(Gls)
2019	Arenas de Getxo	8	(1)
2019	Almería B	0	(0)
2019–2020	Burgos B	17	(4)
2020–2022	Mancha Real	33	(23)
2022–2024	Melilla	66	(11)
2024–2025	Atlético Sanluqueño	14	(4)
2025–	Persik Kediri	41	(15)
- * Club domestic league appearances and goals as of 22:00, 31 October 2026 (UTC)

José Enrique Rodríguez (born 26 August 1995), is a Spanish professional footballer who plays as a forward for Indonesia Super League club Persik Kediri.

== Club career ==
Born in Almería, Spain, Enrique spent his early career in Spain at a young age with CP Almería and Los Molinos. In January 2019, he signed for Arenas de Getxo. In September 2019, Burgos B confirmed the signing of a new player for its first team, Enrique, he previously played for Almería B, a team that plays in Group IX of the Third Division.

The following year, he signed with Mancha Real. He made his league debut on 5 September 2021 in a 1–1 draw with Águilas in the 2021–22 Segunda División RFEF. On 19 September, Enrique scored his first league for the club in a 2–0 win over Toledo. On 31 October, he scored the winning goal in a 1–0 over Socuéllamos. After nearly two and a half seasons with the club, Enrique has scored a total of twenty three goals in all competitions, some of which have been memorable, such as the winning goal he scored against Granada in the 2021–22 Copa del Rey.

In July 2022, Melilla announced an agreement to sign Enrique. The following season, he signed a contract with Atlético Sanluqueño. Enrique finished the season with Sanluqueño, with 4 goals in 14 games.

In August 2025, Indonesian club Persik Kediri announced an agreement to acquire Enrique. On 10 August 2025, Enrique made his Super League debut as a substitute in a 1–1 draw to Bali United.
