= Roman Paparyha =

Ukrainian footballer (born 1999)

Personal information
- Full name: Roman Ruslanovych Paparyha
- Date of birth: 9 July 1999 (age 27)
- Place of birth: Dilove, Ukraine
- Height: 1.81 m (5 ft 11 in)
- Position: Forward

Team information
- Current team: Persis Solo
- Number: 99

Youth career
- 2012–2013: Youth Sportive School Shchaslyve
- 2013–2017: Munkacs Mukachevo
- 2017–2018: Kisvárda

Senior career*
Years	Team	Apps	(Gls)
2016	Meteor Pistryalove (amateurs)	0	(0)
2016	Munkach Mukachevo (amateurs)	1	(0)
2018–2019	Karpaty Rakhiv (amateurs)	18	(3)
2020	Munkach Mukachevo (amateurs)	8	(2)
2021–2022	Rukh Brest	0	(0)
2021	→ Energetik-BGU Minsk (loan)	16	(3)
2022	Energetik-BGU Minsk	29	(2)
2023	Neman Grodno	20	(0)
2024	Naftan Novopolotsk	30	(9)
2025	Qizilqum	26	(3)
2026–	Persis Solo	13	(4)

International career
2016	Ukraine U17	6	(2)
- * Club domestic league appearances and goals as of 9 May 2026

Roman Ruslanovych Paparyha (Ukrainian: Роман Русланович Папарига; born 9 July 1999) is a Ukrainian professional footballer who plays as a forward for Super League club Persis Solo.
