= Hamdan Zamzani =

Indonesian footballer

Personal information
- Full name: Muhammad Hamdan Zamzani
- Date of birth: 21 July 1997 (age 29)
- Place of birth: Sleman, Indonesia
- Height: 1.80 m (5 ft 11 in)
- Position: Centre-back

Youth career
- 2010–2016: PSS Sleman
- 2016: Bali United

Senior career*
Years	Team	Apps	(Gls)
2017–2020	PSS Sleman	25	(0)
2019	→ Sriwijaya (loan)	3	(0)
2019–2020	→ Muba Babel United (loan)	8	(1)
2021	Persiraja Banda Aceh	16	(0)
2021–2023	RANS Nusantara	19	(0)
2023	Persiba Balikpapan	3	(0)
2023–2024	Persipa Pati	4	(0)
2024	Persikas Subang	12	(1)
- * Club domestic league appearances and goals as of 15 December 2024

Muhammad Hamdan Zamzani (born 21 July 1997) is an Indonesian professional footballer who plays as a centre-back.

== Early career ==
Zamzani started his career for joined PSS Sleman junior. He played for the PSS Sleman junior team at the U16, U19 to U21 levels. he also briefly played for Bali United U21 in 2016.

In 2014, he played a test match with his team against Indonesia U19 in the Nusantara Tour. His slick performance made the coach of the Indonesia U19 team at that time, Indra Sjafri, want to recruit him, to take part in training with the young Garuda squad.

== Club career ==
=== PSS Sleman ===
in 2016, Zamzani joined PSS Sleman, he was promoted to the senior team, after previously he played for the junior team, almost 4 seasons, he only made 15 appearances during his debut in the team.

==== Loan to Sriwijaya ====
On 2 April 2019, Sriwijaya announced that Zamzani had joined the Liga 2 club on loan from PSS Sleman for the 2019 season. During his loan spell, Zamzani wore the number 24 jersey. Zamzani was obtained by the Laskar Wong Kito, with a loan option until March 31, 2020.

==== Loan to Muba Babel United ====
On 21 August 2019, Zamzani joined Muba Babel United on loan for the 2019 season. Zamzani made his league goal against Sriwijaya on 17 October. he scored in the 44th minute.

=== Persiraja Banda Aceh ===
On 9 June 2021, Zamzani signed a one-year contract with Persiraja Banda Aceh on a free transfer. He made his professional debut for the club, in a 2–1 loss against Bhayangkara on 29 August 2021.

=== RANS Cilegon ===
He was signed for RANS Cilegon to play in the second round of Liga 2 in the 2021 season. Zamzani made his league debut on 15 December 2021 in a match against Persis Solo at the Pakansari Stadium, Cibinong.

== Honours ==
PSS Sleman

- Liga 2: 2018

RANS Cilegon

- Liga 2 runner-up: 2021
