= Jujun Junaidi =

Indonesian footballer

Personal information
- Full name: Jujun Junaidi
- Date of birth: 30 December 1998 (age 27)
- Place of birth: Bandung, Indonesia
- Height: 1.75 m (5 ft 9 in)
- Position: Right winger

Senior career*
Years	Team	Apps	(Gls)
2021–2023	RANS Nusantara	20	(2)
2023–2024	Bekasi City	21	(1)
- * Club domestic league appearances and goals as of 20 December 2024

Jujun Junaidi (born 30 December 1998) is an Indonesian professional footballer who plays as a right winger.

== Club career ==
=== RANS Nusantara ===
Jujun was signed for RANS Nusantara to play in Liga 2 in the 2021–22 season. He made his league debut on 21 November 2021 in a match against Dewa United at the Gelora Bung Karno Madya Stadium, Jakarta.

== Career statistics ==
=== Club ===
As of 20 December 2024

Club	Season	League			Cup		Continental		Other (Note: Appearances in Indonesia President's Cup)		Total	
Club	Season	Division	Apps	Goals	Apps	Goals	Apps	Goals	Apps	Goals	Apps	Goals
RANS Nusantara	2021	Liga 2	9	1	0	0	–		0	0	9	1
RANS Nusantara	2022–23	Liga 1	11	1	0	0	–		3	0	14	1
Bekasi City	2023–24	Liga 2	13	1	0	0	–		0	0	13	1
Bekasi City	2024–25	Liga 2	8	0	0	0	–		0	0	8	0
Career total			41	3	0	0	0	0	3	0	44	3

== Honours ==
=== Club ===
RANS Cilegon

- Liga 2 runner-up: 2021
