= Engenho Velho =

Municipality in Rio Grande do Sul, Brazil

Coordinates: 27°42′28″S 52°54′46″W

- Municipality
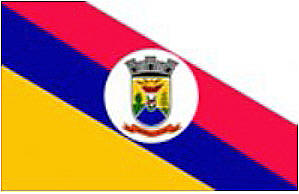
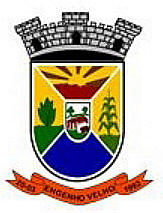
- Flag Coat of arms
- Interactive map of Engenho Velho
- Country: Brazil
- Time zone: UTC−3 (BRT)

Engenho Velho is a municipality in the state of Rio Grande do Sul, Brazil. As of 2020, the estimated population was 982.

== See also ==
- List of municipalities in Rio Grande do Sul
