= Ikhwan Tanamal =

Indonesian footballer (born 2003)

- Ikhwan plays with Persib Bandung, 2026.

Personal information
- Full name: Ikhwan Ali Tanamal
- Date of birth: 28 December 2003 (age 22)
- Place of birth: Tulehu, Indonesia
- Height: 1.65 m (5 ft 5 in)
- Positions: Left-back; winger; attacking midfielder

Team information
- Current team: Persib Bandung
- Number: 40

Youth career
- PPLP Bogor Regency
- Diklat Ragunan
- Persindra Indramayu
- Persita Tangerang U20

Senior career*
Years	Team	Apps	(Gls)
2023–2025	Persita Tangerang	20	(0)
2025–	Persib Bandung	5	(0)
2025–2026	→ Persis Solo (loan)	6	(0)
- * Club domestic league appearances and goals as of 1 November 2026

Ikhwan Ali Tanamal (born 28 December 2003) is an Indonesian footballer who plays as a left-back, winger or attacking midfielder for Super League club Persib Bandung.

== Club career ==
=== Persita Tangerang ===
Born in Tulehu, Indonesia, Ikhwan first emerged through youth systems including PPLP Bogor Regency, Diklat Ragunan, Persindra Indramayu, and Persita Tangerang U20, later earning promotion to Persita senior squad. Ikhwan made his first-team debut on 25 August 2023 in a 2–1 lose against Borneo Samarinda at the Segiri Stadium.

On 4 November 2024, he started his match in the new season for Persita Tangerang as substituted in a 1–1 draw over Malut United. He was always given a chance to play under coach Fabio Lefundes in sixth appearances until week 16, he managed to record two assists that contributed positively to the team.

During the 2024–25 Liga 1 season, Ikhwan featured in 20 league matches for Persita, providing three assists and accumulating 1,022 minutes of playing time.

=== Persis Solo ===
On 6 July 2025, he was signed by Persib Bandung, but immediately loaned out to Persis Solo for the 2025–26 Liga 1 season.

== Style of play ==
Ikhwan is a left-footed winger known for his dribbling, creativity, and vision in the final third. He has been praised for his work rate and potential to grow in a competitive environment like Persis Solo.

== Honours ==
Persib Bandung

- Piala Presiden runner-up: 2026

Persita Tangerang U-20

- Elite Pro Academy Liga 1 U-20: 2024–25
