= Miroslav Maričić =

Serbian footballer

Personal information
- Full name: Miroslav Maričić
- Date of birth: 21 January 1998 (age 28)
- Place of birth: Ivanjica, FR Yugoslavia
- Height: 1.80 m (5 ft 11 in)
- Position: Midfielder

Team information
- Current team: Javor Ivanjica
- Number: 10

Youth career
- Javor Ivanjica

Senior career*
Years	Team	Apps	(Gls)
2016–2022	Javor Ivanjica	148	(7)
2022	Mladost Novi Sad	11	(0)
2023	Mladost Lučani	9	(0)
2023–2024	Inđija	35	(4)
2024–2025	Radnik Bijeljina	39	(3)
2026	Persis Solo	16	(2)
2026–	Javor Ivanjica	0	(0)
- * Club domestic league appearances and goals as of 18 April 2026

Miroslav Maričić (Serbian Cyrillic: Мирослав Маричић; born 21 January 1998) is a Serbian professional footballer who plays as a midfielder for Javor Ivanjica.

== Career ==
=== Javor Ivanjica ===
Maričić joined the first team of Javor Ivanjica for the 2015–16 season and was on the bench during a Serbian Cup match against Novi Pazar. Previously, he passed all categories of club youth school. He made his senior debut in 35 fixture match of Serbian SuperLiga against Metalac Gornji Milanovac, played on 7 May 2016. Maričić signed four-year scholarship contract with club at the beginning of June 2016. In summer 2017, Maričić signed his first three-year professional contract with the club.

== Career statistics ==
As of 23 November 2020

Club	Season	League			Cup		Continental		Other		Total	
Club	Season	Division	Apps	Goals	Apps	Goals	Apps	Goals	Apps	Goals	Apps	Goals
Javor Ivanjica	2015–16	Serbian SuperLiga	2	0	0	0	—		—		2	0
Javor Ivanjica	2016–17	Serbian SuperLiga	11	0	1	0	—		—		12	0
Javor Ivanjica	2017–18	Serbian SuperLiga	14	0	2	0	—		—		16	0
Javor Ivanjica	2018–19	Serbian First League	26	1	2	0	—		—		28	1
Javor Ivanjica	2019–20	Serbian SuperLiga	26	2	1	0	—		—		27	2
Total			79	3	6	0	—		—		85	3
