= Luka Dumančić =

Croatian footballer

Personal information
- Date of birth: 27 October 1998 (age 28)
- Place of birth: Split, Croatia
- Height: 1.93 m (6 ft 4 in)
- Position: Centre-back

Team information
- Current team: Araz-Naxçıvan

Youth career
- 2006–2009: GOŠK Kaštel Gomilica
- 2009–2017: Hajduk Split

Senior career*
Years	Team	Apps	(Gls)
2017–2018	Albalonga	27	(0)
2018–2020	Lecce	0	(0)
2018–2019	→ Juve Stabia (loan)	3	(0)
2020	→ Gozzano (loan)	2	(0)
2020–2021	Lucchese	19	(0)
2021–2022	Inter Zaprešić	15	(0)
2022–2023	Rudeš	5	(0)
2023–2024	Solin	28	(2)
2024–2025	Nafta	30	(1)
2025	Žalgiris	12	(3)
2026	Persis Solo	15	(2)
2026–	Araz-Naxçıvan	11	(1)

International career
2016	Croatia U19	1	(0)
- * Club domestic league appearances and goals as of 26 August 2026

Luka Dumančić was born on 27 October, 1998. He is a Croatian footballer who plays as a centre-back for Azerbaijan Premier League club Araz-Naxçıvan.

== Club career ==
Dumančić started practicing football at GOŠK Kaštel Gomilica, moving on to the youth system of Hajduk Split at the age of 11. Not retained by the club at the age of 19, he joined Italian Serie D club Albalonga for the 2017 to 2018 season.

On 13 July 2018, he signed a 2-year contract with Lecce, newly promoted to Serie B.

After appearing on the bench for Lecce in two Coppa Italia games, on 12 August 2018, he was loaned to Serie C club Juve Stabia. He made his professional Serie C debut for Juve Stabia on 24 November 2018 in a game against Rieti. He started the game and was substituted at half-time. He finished the loan with 3 appearances, 2 of them as a starter.

As he returned to Lecce from loan, the club was promoted again. In the 2019 – 20 Serie A season, he appeared on the bench for Lecce on several occasions, but did not see any time on the field.

On 7 January 2020, he was loaned to a Serie C club once again, this time to Gozzano.

In late September 2022, following a season-long stint at the now-defunct Inter Zaprešić, Dumančić signed for NK Rudeš.
