= Sho Yamamoto =

Japanese footballer

Sho Yamamoto 山本 奨
Personal information
- Full name: Sho Yamamoto
- Date of birth: 12 November 1996 (age 30)
- Place of birth: Kasukabe, Saitama, Japan
- Height: 1.74 m (5 ft 9 in)
- Position: Midfielder

Team information
- Current team: Sabah
- Number: 17

Youth career
- 2012–2014: Bunan High School

Senior career*
Years	Team	Apps	(Gls)
2016–2017	Rudar Pljevlja	15	(2)
2017–2019	Petrovac	47	(7)
2019–2020	Spartak Subotica	2	(0)
2020	→ Iskra Danilovgrad (loan)	8	(0)
2020–2022	Iskra Danilovgrad	49	(4)
2022–2023	Persebaya Surabaya	51	(12)
2023–2026	Persis Solo	61	(6)
2026	→ Bhayangkara Presisi (loan)	14	(0)
2026–	Sabah	1	(0)
- * Club domestic league appearances and goals as of 13 September 2026

Sho Yamamoto (山本 奨, Yamamoto Sho; born 12 November 1996) is a Japanese professional footballer who plays as a midfielder for Malaysia Super League club Sabah.

== Career ==
Born in Kasukabe, Yamamoto debuted professionally already abroad in Europe with Rudar Pljevlja in the 2016–17 Montenegrin First League. He will play the following two seasons with another Montenegrin top-flight side, Petrovac. His successful adaptation to football in former-Yugoslavia made him come up on the radars of other teams from the region, which resulted in his move in summer 2019 to Serbian side Spartak Subotica.

He scored the winning goal against Arema in a Liga 1 match, which makes his club Persebaya Surabaya defeat Arema for the first time in 23 years and led the Kanjuruhan Stadium disaster.

== Career statistics ==
=== Club ===
As of 13 September 2026

Club	Season	League			Cup		Other		Total	
Club	Season	Division	Apps	Goals	Apps	Goals	Apps	Goals	Apps	Goals
Rudar Pljevlja	2016–17	Montenegrin First League	15	2	2 (Note: Appearances in the Montenegrin Cup)	0	0	0	17	2
OFK Petrovac	2017–18	Montenegrin First League	17	0	0	0	2 (Note: Appearances in the Montenegrin First League playoffs)	0	19	0
OFK Petrovac	2018–19	Montenegrin First League	30	7	4	0	0	0	34	7
OFK Petrovac	Total		47	7	4	0	2	0	53	7
Spartak Subotica	2019–20	Serbian SuperLiga	2	0	0	0	0	0	2	0
Iskra Danilovgrad (loan)	2019–20	Montenegrin First League	8	0	0	0	0	0	8	0
Iskra Danilovgrad	2020–21	Montenegrin First League	22	1	3	0	1 (Note: Appearances in UEFA Europa League qualifying)	0	26	1
Iskra Danilovgrad	2021–22	Montenegrin First League	27	3	1	1	0	0	28	4
Iskra Danilovgrad	Total		49	4	4	1	1	0	62	5
Persebaya Surabaya	2022–23	Liga 1	33	10	0	0	0	0	33	10
Persebaya Surabaya	2023–24	Liga 1	18	2	0	0	0	0	18	2
Persebaya Surabaya	Total		51	12	0	0	0	0	51	12
Persis Solo	2023–24	Liga 1	15	1	0	0	0	0	15	1
Persis Solo	2024–25	Liga 1	31	3	0	0	0	0	31	3
Persis Solo	2025–26	Super League	15	2	0	0	0	0	15	2
Bhayangkara Presisi Lampung (loan)	2025–26	Super League	14	0	0	0	0	0	14	0
Sabah	2026–27	Malaysia Super League	1	0	0	0	0	0	1	0
Career total			249	31	10	1	3	0	262	32

== Honours ==
Individual

- Liga 1 Team of the Season: 2022–23
