= Mochammad Zaenuri =

Indonesian association football player

Personal information
- Full name: Mochammad Zaenuri
- Date of birth: 10 June 1995 (age 31)
- Place of birth: Bojonegoro, Indonesia
- Height: 1.82 m (6 ft 0 in)
- Position: Centre-back

Youth career
- 2014–2015: Persibo Bojonegoro

Senior career*
Years	Team	Apps	(Gls)
2015	Bhayangkara	0	(0)
2016	Persepam Madura Utama	15	(0)
2017	Perseru Serui	28	(1)
2017–2018	Arema	3	(0)
2018–2022	Persela Lamongan	59	(4)
2022	Persebaya Surabaya	0	(0)
2022–2024	Dewa United	31	(0)
2024–2025	Persis Solo	9	(0)
2025–2026	Persikad Depok	14	(0)

International career
2014–2015	Indonesia U23	2	(0)
2014	Indonesia	1	(0)
- * Club domestic league appearances and goals as of 2 May 2026

Mochammad Zaenuri (born 10 June 1995) is an Indonesian professional footballer who plays as a centre-back.

== Club career ==
=== Perseru Serui ===
In 2017, Zaenuri signed a year contract with Perseru Serui. He made his league debut on 20 April 2017 in a match against Bhayangkara. On 18 October 2017, Zaenuri scored his first goal for Perseru against Persegres Gresik United in the 45th minute at the Petrokimia Stadium, Gresik.

=== Arema ===
After being released by Perseru Serui, Arema immediately signed Zaenuri on a free transfer during the 2018 mid-season transfer window. He made his league debut on 24 March 2017 in a match against Mitra Kukar at the Kanjuruhan Stadium, Malang.

=== Persela Lamongan ===
He was signed for Persela Lamongan to play in Liga 1 in the 2018 season. Zaenuri made his debut on 16 September 2018 in a match against Bhayangkara. On 26 June 2019, Zaenuri scored his first goal for Persela against Bhayangkara in the 3rd minute at the Patriot Stadium, Bekasi.

=== Persebaya Surabaya ===
Zaenuri was signed for Persebaya Surabaya to play in Liga 1 in the 2022–23 season.

=== Dewa United ===
Zaenuri was signed for Dewa United to play in Liga 1 in the 2022–23 season. He made his league debut on 7 August 2022 in a match against Persita Tangerang at the Indomilk Arena, Tangerang.

== International career ==
Zaenuri made his international debut on 15 May 2014, in a 1–1 draw against Dominican Republic. In 2014, Zaenuri represented the Indonesia U-23, in the 2014 Asian Games.

== Career statistics ==
=== Club ===
As of match played 2 May 2026

Club	Season	League			Cup (Note: Includes Piala Indonesia)		Continental		Other (Note: Appearances in Indonesia President's Cup)		Total	
Club	Season	Division	Apps	Goals	Apps	Goals	Apps	Goals	Apps	Goals	Apps	Goals
Persepam Madura Utama	2016	ISC B	15	0	0	0	–		0	0	15	0
Perseru Serui	2017	Liga 1	27	1	0	0	–		3	0	30	1
Arema	2018	Liga 1	3	0	0	0	–		1	0	4	0
Persela Lamongan	2018	Liga 1	5	0	0	0	–		0	0	5	0
Persela Lamongan	2019	Liga 1	26	3	0	0	–		0	0	26	3
Persela Lamongan	2020	Liga 1	3	0	0	0	–		0	0	3	0
Persela Lamongan	2021–22	Liga 1	25	1	0	0	–		4 (Note: Appearances in Menpora Cup)	0	29	1
Persela Lamongan	Total		59	4	0	0	–		4	0	63	4
Persebaya Surabaya	2022–23	Liga 1	0	0	0	0	–		1	0	1	0
Dewa United	2022–23	Liga 1	15	0	0	0	–		0	0	15	0
Dewa United	2023–24	Liga 1	16	0	0	0	–		0	0	16	0
Dewa United	Total		31	0	0	0	–		0	0	31	0
Persis Solo	2024–25	Liga 1	9	0	0	0	–		0	0	9	0
Persikad Depok	2025–26	Liga 2	14	0	0	0	–		0	0	14	0
Career total			158	5	0	0	–		9	0	167	5

=== International ===
As of match played 15 May 2014

Appearances and goals by national team and year
National team	Year	Apps	Goals
Indonesia	2014	1	0
Total		1	0
