= Lautaro Belleggia =

Argentine footballer

Personal information
- Full name: Lautaro José Belleggia
- Date of birth: 21 March 1997 (age 29)
- Place of birth: Carhué, Argentina
- Height: 1.76 m (5 ft 9 in)
- Position: Midfielder

Youth career
- 2015–2017: Olimpo

Senior career*
Years	Team	Apps	(Gls)
2017–2021	Olimpo	18	(1)
2021–2024	Gimnasia Jujuy	47	(1)
2023	→ Brown de Adrogué (loan)	30	(0)
2024	Güemes	33	(4)
2025	Persis Solo	16	(4)
2025	Volta Redonda	1	(0)
2025–2026	Bhayangkara	9	(0)
- * Club domestic league appearances and goals as of 12 January 2026

Lautaro José Belleggia (born 21 March 1997) is an Argentine professional footballer who plays as a midfielder.

== Career ==
Belleggia was promoted into Argentine Primera División side Olimpo's first-team squad during the 2016–17 campaign. He was an unused substitute four times prior to making his professional debut on 10 April 2017 versus Defensa y Justicia; he was substituted on four minutes into a 1–1 draw for Martín Pérez Guedes.

== Career statistics ==
As of 5 January 2026.

Club statistics
Club	Season	League			Cup (Note: Includes the Copa Argentina)		League Cup		Continental		Other		Total	
Club	Season	Division	Apps	Goals	Apps	Goals	Apps	Goals	Apps	Goals	Apps	Goals	Apps	Goals
Olimpo	2016–17	Primera División	1	0	0	0	—		—		0	0	1	0
Olimpo	2017–18	Primera División	2	0	1	0	—		—		0	0	3	0
Olimpo	2018–19	Primera Nacional	11	1	0	0	—		—		0	0	11	1
Olimpo	2019–20	Torneo Federal A	4	0	0	0	—		—		0	0	4	0
Olimpo	Total		18	1	1	0	—		—		0	0	19	1
Gimnasia Jujuy	2021	Primera Nacional	22	0	0	0	—		—		0	0	22	0
Gimnasia Jujuy	2022	Primera Nacional	25	1	0	0	—		—		0	0	25	1
Gimnasia Jujuy	Total		47	1	0	0	—		—		0	0	47	1
Brown de Adrogué (loan)	2023	Primera Nacional	30	0	0	0	—		—		0	0	30	0
Güemes	2024	Primera Nacional	33	4	0	0	—		—		0	0	33	4
Persis Solo	2024–25	Liga 1	16	4	0	0	—		—		0	0	16	4
Volta Redonda	2025	Série B	1	0	0	0	—		—		0	0	1	0
Bhayangkara	2025–26	Liga 1	8	0	0	0	—		—		0	0	8	0
Career total			153	10	1	0	—		—		0	0	154	10
