= Faqih Maulana =

Indonesian footballer

Personal information
- Full name: Muhammad Faqih Maulana
- Date of birth: 11 September 2004 (age 22)
- Place of birth: Bekasi, Indonesia
- Height: 1.74 m (5 ft 9 in)
- Position: Left-back

Team information
- Current team: Adhyaksa Bekasi
- Number: 96

Youth career
- SSB Tajimalela
- 2018: TopSkor Indonesia
- 2019: Bhayangkara
- 2020–2021: Garuda Select
- 2021–2022: Persis Solo

Senior career*
Years	Team	Apps	(Gls)
2022–2026	Persis Solo	43	(0)
2025	→ PSIS Semarang (loan)	7	(0)
2026–	Adhyaksa Bekasi	0	(0)
- * Club domestic league appearances and goals as of 28 September 2025

Muhammad Faqih Maulana (born 11 September 2004) is an Indonesian professional footballer who plays as a left-back for Championship club Adhyaksa Bekasi.

== Club career ==
=== Persis Solo ===
Faqih is one of the young players promoted from the Persis Solo Youth. On 21 February 2023, Faqih made his league debut for Persis in a 4–1 win over PSS Sleman.

=== PSIS Semarang (loan) ===
Faqih was loaned to PSIS Semarang for half a season until the end of the 2024–25 Liga 1 competition.

== Career statistics ==
=== Club ===
As of 28 September 2025

Club	Season	League		Cup		Continental		Other		Total	
Club	Season	Apps	Goals	Apps	Goals	Apps	Goals	Apps	Goals	Apps	Goals
Persis Solo	2022–23	1	0	0	0	0	0	0	0	1	0
Persis Solo	2023–24	26	0	0	0	0	0	0	0	26	0
Persis Solo	2024–25	14	0	0	0	–		0	0	14	0
Persis Solo	2025–26	2	0	0	0	–		0	0	2	0
PSIS Semarang (loan)	2024–25	7	0	0	0	–		0	0	7	0
Career total		50	0	0	0	0	0	0	0	50	0
