= Cleylton =

Brazilian footballer (born 1993)

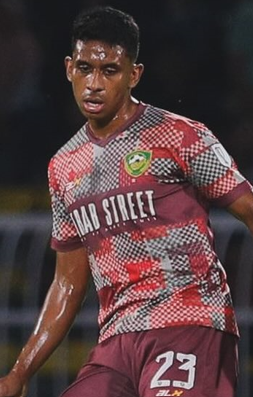
- Cleylton playing for Kedah Darul Aman in 2024

Personal information
- Full name: José Cleylton de Morais dos Santos
- Date of birth: 19 March 1993 (age 33)
- Place of birth: Fortaleza, Brazil
- Height: 1.90 m (6 ft 3 in)
- Position: Centre-back

Team information
- Current team: Java United
- Number: 3

Youth career
- 2012: Ferroviário

Senior career*
Years	Team	Apps	(Gls)
2012–2013	Ferroviário	27	(2)
2013	→ Grêmio (loan)	0	(0)
2014	Grêmio	2	(0)
2014	→ Cuiabá (loan)	0	(0)
2014	→ Icasa (loan)	0	(0)
2014	→ Novo Hamburgo (loan)	11	(0)
2015	→ Inter de Lages (loan)	1	(0)
2016	→ São José (loan)	4	(0)
2016	São Paulo-RS	9	(1)
2016	Mirassol	6	(0)
2017	São Paulo-RS	15	(3)
2017–2018	Belenenses	4	(0)
2018–2019	Belenenses SAD	15	(1)
2019–2020	Hatta	18	(1)
2020–2021	Al-Khaldiya SC		
2021	Ponte Preta	22	(0)
2022–2023	Chapecoense	11	(0)
2024	Ipatinga	7	(0)
2024	Kedah Darul Aman	15	(4)
2025–2026	Persis Solo	29	(4)
2026	→ Borneo Samarinda (loan)	15	(0)
2026–	Java United	0	(0)
- * Club domestic league appearances and goals as of 23 May 2026

José Cleylton de Morais dos Santos (born 19 March 1993), simply known as Cleylton, is a Brazilian professional footballer who plays as a centre-back for Super League club Java United.

== Career ==
Cleylton began his career in Ferroviário, where he played the Copa Fares Lopes, a Ceará state competition, in 2012 and the Campeonato Cearense in 2013. In that same year, he joined Grêmio on loan.

=== Inter de Lages ===
Between 2014 and 2015, Cleylton joined clubs such as Cuiabá, Icasa and Novo Hamburgo. In 2015, he played the Campeonato Catarinense for the first time in his career after joining Inter de Lages.
