= Sutanto Tan =

Indonesian footballer

Personal information
- Full name: Sutanto Tan
- Date of birth: 4 May 1994 (age 32)
- Place of birth: Pekanbaru, Indonesia
- Height: 1.80 m (5 ft 11 in)
- Positions: Midfielder; centre-back

Team information
- Current team: Persita Tangerang
- Number: 18

Youth career
- 2009–2010: PS Batam
- 2010: Geylang United
- 2011: Persib Bandung
- 2011–2012: Pelita Jaya

Senior career*
Years	Team	Apps	(Gls)
2013–2014	Hougang United	3	(0)
2014–2015	Mitra Kukar	8	(0)
2016–2017	Persija Jakarta	44	(0)
2017–2019	Bali United	7	(0)
2019	PSIM Yogyakarta	8	(0)
2020–2021	PSMS Medan	1	(0)
2021–2022	PSM Makassar	18	(1)
2022–2026	Persis Solo	95	(3)
2026–	Persita Tangerang	0	(0)

International career^{‡}
2015	Indonesia U23	1	(0)
- * Club domestic league appearances and goals as of 16 May 2026 ‡ National team caps and goals as of 17 February 2015

Sutanto Tan (born 4 May 1994) is an Indonesian professional footballer who plays as a midfielder for Super League club Persita Tangerang.

== Club career ==
=== Hougang United ===
In 2014, Sutanto joined S.League club Hougang United FC. Where, since he was 20 years old, he played in the club as a striker. In September 2014, Sutanto made his debut in the 2014 S.League against Harimau Muda B. In that match, Sutanto replaced Diego Gama in the 76th minute. And in a friendly match against FC Gifu, Sutanto scored the opening goal in 4–0 won over FC Gifu.

=== Mitra Kukar ===
In 2016, he joined Mitra Kukar in the 2016 Bhayangkara Cup tournament.

=== Persija Jakarta ===
After short and unsuccessful stints with Bali United and Mitra Kukar, Sutanto joined Persija Jakarta for the 2016 Torabika Soccer Championship A (TSC). He made the starting lineup for the opening match against Persipura Jayapura in Jayapura, and played the full 90 minutes. Deemed under-performed on the match with ended 1-1, then coach, Paulo Camargo, decided to sideline Sutanto for the following matches.

=== Bali United ===
On December 12, 2017, he signed a one-year contract with Bali United. On 16 April 2018, Sutanto made his league debut for the club in a match against Persela Lamongan, coming on as a substitute for Miloš Krkotić in the 88th minute. During his spell in Bali United, Sutanto joined a trial programme in Sweden for Dalkurd FF, but failed to impress the coaches. He returned to Bali United on January 27, 2019. During his career at Bali United, he only made 7 league appearances

=== PSIM Yogyakarta ===
Sutanto joined PSIM Yogyakarta on August 18, 2019, as a free transfer during the second Indonesian transfer window.

=== PSMS Medan ===
In 2020, Sutanto signed a one-year contract with Indonesian Liga 2 club PSMS Medan. This season was suspended on 27 March 2020 due to the COVID-19 pandemic. The season was abandoned and was declared void on 20 January 2021.

=== PSM Makassar ===
In 2021, Sutanto signed a one-year contract with PSM Makassar for 2021 Menpora Cup and 2021–22 Liga 1. He made his league debut on 5 September by starting in a 1–1 draw against Arema at the Pakansari Stadium, Cibinong, and he also give assists a goal by Ilham Armaiyn in 23rd minutes. He played the full 90 minutes in a 1–1 draw against Madura United on 12 September. On 2 December, Sutanto scored his first league goal for PSM in a 1–1 draw over Persela Lamongan, where he scored from a penalty kick, it was his first goal in an official competition. He had previously never scored a single goal during his career as a footballer.

=== Persis Solo ===
Sutanto was signed for Persis Solo to play in Liga 1 in the 2022–23 season. He made his league debut on 31 July 2022 in a match against Persija Jakarta at the Patriot Candrabhaga Stadium, Bekasi. On 6 December, Sutanto scored his first league goal for Persis Solo, the opening goal against RANS Nusantara in a 6–1 win in the Liga 1.
