= Braif Fatari =

Indonesian footballer

Personal information
- Full name: Braif Fatari
- Date of birth: 9 April 2002 (age 24)
- Place of birth: Manado, Indonesia
- Height: 1.80 m (5 ft 11 in)
- Position: Attacking midfielder

Team information
- Current team: De Red
- Number: 28

Youth career
- 2019: Garuda Select
- 2019–2020: Persija Jakarta

Senior career*
| Years | Team | Apps | (Gls) |
| 2020–2023 | Persija Jakarta | 23 | (2) |
| 2023 | Persik Kediri | 1 | (0) |
| 2023–2024 | Nusantara United | 11 | (0) |
| 2024–2025 | Persis Solo | 6 | (0) |
| 2025–2026 | Garudayaksa | 5 | (0) |
| 2026 | Persikad Depok | 2 | (2) |
| 2026– | De Red | 0 | (0) |

International career
| 2019–2020 | Indonesia U19 | 7 | (1) |
| 2021 | Indonesia | 1 | (0) |
Medal record
Men's football
Representing Indonesia
AFF U-19 Youth Championship
| Third place | 2019 Vietnam |
- * Club domestic league appearances and goals as of 25 April 2026

Braif Fatari (born 9 April 2002) is an Indonesian professional footballer who plays as an attacking midfielder for Championship club De Red.

== Club career ==
=== Persija Jakarta ===
Fatari made his first-team debut for Persija in the 2021 Menpora Cup, a pre-season tournament ahead of the 2021 Liga 1 season, in which he scored a goal in the final against Persib Bandung and helped his club become champions. That goal was the fastest in the tournament as it occurred only 32 seconds after the game started.

== International career ==
Fatari debuted in the Indonesia U-19 at the 2019 AFF U-19 Youth Championship and scored his first goal in the U-19 squad when it faced Saudi Arabia U-19 in a friendly on 11 September 2020. He was call up in the senior Indonesia national football team in May 2021. He earned his first senior cap in a 25 May 2021 friendly match in Dubai against Afghanistan.

== Career statistics ==
=== Club ===
As of 25 April 2026

Appearances and goals by club, season and competition
| Club | Season | League | | | Cup | | Continental | | Other | | Total | |
| Club | Season | Division | Apps | Goals | Apps | Goals | Apps | Goals | Apps | Goals | Apps | Goals |
|---|---|---|---|---|---|---|---|---|---|---|---|---|
| Persija Jakarta | 2020 | Liga 1 | 0 | 0 | 0 | 0 | – | | 0 | 0 | 0 | 0 |
| Persija Jakarta | 2021–22 | Liga 1 | 20 | 2 | 0 | 0 | – | | 4 (Note: Appearances in Menpora Cup) | 1 | 24 | 3 |
| Persija Jakarta | 2022–23 | Liga 1 | 3 | 0 | 0 | 0 | – | | 1 (Note: Appearances in Indonesia President's Cup) | 0 | 4 | 0 |
| Persija Jakarta | Total | | 23 | 2 | 0 | 0 | – | | 5 | 1 | 28 | 3 |
| Persik Kediri | 2022–23 | Liga 1 | 1 | 0 | 0 | 0 | — | | 0 | 0 | 1 | 0 |
| Nusantara United | 2023–24 | Liga 2 | 11 | 0 | 0 | 0 | — | | 0 | 0 | 11 | 0 |
| Persis Solo | 2024–25 | Liga 1 | 6 | 0 | 0 | 0 | — | | 0 | 0 | 6 | 0 |
| Garudayaksa | 2025–26 | Championship | 5 | 0 | 0 | 0 | — | | 0 | 0 | 5 | 0 |
| Persikad Depok | 2025–26 | Championship | 2 | 2 | 0 | 0 | — | | 0 | 0 | 2 | 2 |
| Career total | | | 48 | 4 | 0 | 0 | 0 | 0 | 5 | 1 | 53 | 5 |

=== International ===
As of match played 29 May 2021

Appearances and goals by national team and year
| National team | Year | Apps | Goals |
|---|---|---|---|
| Indonesia | 2021 | 2 | 0 |
| Total | | 2 | 0 |

== Honours ==
Persija Jakarta

- Menpora Cup champions: 2021

Indonesia U-19

- AFF U-19 Youth Championship third place: 2019
