= Gianluca Pandeynuwu =

Indonesian footballer

Personal information
- Full name: Gianluca Claudio Pandeynuwu
- Date of birth: 9 November 1997 (age 29)
- Place of birth: Tomohon, Indonesia
- Height: 1.85 m (6 ft 1 in)
- Position: Goalkeeper

Team information
- Current team: Arema
- Number: 31

Youth career
- 2013: Perminsel
- 2014–2015: PSKT Tomohon
- 2016: Borneo

Senior career*
Years	Team	Apps	(Gls)
2016–2022	Borneo	41	(0)
2017	→ PSPS Pekanbaru (loan)	20	(0)
2022–2026	Persis Solo	47	(0)
2026	→ Arema (loan)	2	(0)
2026–	Arema	0	(0)
- * Club domestic league appearances and goals as of 10 March 2026

Gianluca Claudio Pandeynuwu (born 9 November 1997) is an Indonesian professional footballer who plays as a goalkeeper for Super League club Arema.

== Club career ==
=== Borneo FC ===
He was signed for Borneo to play in Indonesia Soccer Championship A in 2016. Pandeynuwu made his first-team debut on 17 November 2018 in a match against Perseru Serui at the Marora Stadium, Yapen.

==== PSPS Pekanbaru (loan) ====
In 2017, he joined PSPS Pekanbaru in the 2017 Liga 2 as a loan, and he was called to the Indonesia U-19.

=== Persis Solo ===
Pandeynuwu was signed for Persis Solo to play in Liga 1 in the 2022–23 season. He made his league debut on 29 September 2022 in a match against PSM Makassar at the Manahan Stadium, Surakarta.

==== Arema (loan) ====
On 27 January 2026, Pandeynuwu officially joined Arema on loan until the end of the season. On 24 June 2026, Gianluca has extended his loan spell with Arema until the end of the 2026–27 season.

== Career statistics ==
=== Club ===
As of match played 10 March 2026

Club	Season	League			Cup (Note: Includes Piala Indonesia)		League cup (Note: Includes I-League Cup)		Continental		Other (Note: Appearances in Piala Presiden)		Total	
Club	Season	Division	Apps	Goals	Apps	Goals	Apps	Goals	Apps	Goals	Apps	Goals	Apps	Goals
Borneo	2016	ISC A	0	0	0	0	0	0	0	0	0	0	0	0
Borneo	2018	Liga 1	1	0	0	0	0	0	0	0	0	0	1	0
Borneo	2019	Liga 1	14	0	0	0	0	0	0	0	0	0	14	0
Borneo	2020	Liga 1	3	0	0	0	0	0	0	0	0	0	3	0
Borneo	2021–22	Liga 1	23	0	0	0	0	0	0	0	2 (Note: Appearances in Menpora Cup)	0	25	0
Borneo	Total		41	0	0	0	0	0	0	0	2	0	43	0
PSPS Pekanbaru (loan)	2017	Liga 2	20	0	0	0	0	0	0	0	0	0	20	0
Persis Solo	2022–23	Liga 1	20	0	0	0	0	0	0	0	1	0	21	0
Persis Solo	2023–24	Liga 1	16	0	0	0	0	0	–		0	0	16	0
Persis Solo	2024–25	Liga 1	8	0	0	0	0	0	–		0	0	8	0
Persis Solo	2025–26	Super League	3	0	0	0	0	0	–		0	0	3	0
Persis Solo	Total		47	0	0	0	0	0	0	0	1	0	48	0
Arema (loan)	2025–26	Super League	2	0	0	0	0	0	–		0	0	2	0
Arema	2026–27	Super League	0	0	0	0	0	0	–		0	0	0	0
Career total			110	0	0	0	0	0	0	0	3	0	113	0
