= Althaf Indie =

Indonesian footballer

Personal information
- Full name: Althaf Indie Alrizky
- Date of birth: 6 January 2003 (age 23)
- Place of birth: Bekasi, Indonesia
- Height: 1.64 m (5 ft 5 in)
- Position: Winger

Team information
- Current team: Persik Kediri
- Number: 14

Youth career
- 2017–2019: ASIOP Apacinti
- 2019–2020: TIRA-Persikabo
- 2020–2021: Persib Bandung
- 2022: Persis Solo

Senior career*
Years	Team	Apps	(Gls)
2022–2026	Persis Solo	106	(5)
2026–	Persik Kediri	8	(0)

International career^{‡}
2017	Indonesia U16	4	(1)
2025	Indonesia U23	1	(0)
Medal record
Men's football
Representing Indonesia
ASEAN U-23 Championship
Runner-up	2025 Indonesia	Team
- * Club domestic league appearances and goals as of 31 October 2026 ‡ National team caps and goals as of 15 July 2025 (UTC)

Althaf Indie Alrizky (born 6 January 2003) is an Indonesian professional footballer who plays as a winger for Super League club Persik Kediri.

== Club career ==
=== Persis Solo ===
He was signed for Persis Solo to play in Liga 1 in the 2022 season. Althaf made his league debut on 31 July 2022 in a match against Persija Jakarta at the Patriot Candrabhaga Stadium, Bekasi.

== Career statistics ==
=== Club ===
As of 31 October 2026

Club	Season	League		Cup		Continental		Other		Total	
Club	Season	Apps	Goals	Apps	Goals	Apps	Goals	Apps	Goals	Apps	Goals
Persis Solo	2022–23	15	1	0	0	0	0	1 (Note: Appearances in Indonesia President's Cup)	0	16	1
Persis Solo	2023–24	29	4	0	0	0	0	0	0	29	4
Persis Solo	2024–25	32	0	0	0	–		4	0	36	0
Persis Solo	2025–26	30	0	0	0	–		0	0	30	0
Persik Kediri	2026–27	8	0	0	0	0	0	0	0	8	0
Career total		115	5	0	0	0	0	5	0	119	5

== Honours ==
Indonesia U23

- ASEAN U-23 Championship runner-up: 2025

Individual

- Liga 1 U-16 Best Player: 2019
- Liga 1 Young Player of the Month: February 2024
