= Zanadin Fariz =

Indonesian footballer

Personal information
- Full name: Zanadin Fariz
- Date of birth: 31 May 2004 (age 22)
- Place of birth: Bekasi, Indonesia
- Height: 1.65 m (5 ft 5 in)
- Position: Midfielder

Team information
- Current team: Persik Kediri
- Number: 8

Youth career
- 2016–2018: Tangsel Muda
- 2019: Badak Lampung
- 2021–2022: Persis Solo

Senior career*
Years	Team	Apps	(Gls)
2022–2026	Persis Solo	68	(4)
2026–	Persik Kediri	8	(1)

International career^{‡}
2022–2023	Indonesia U20	13	(1)
2025–	Indonesia U23	5	(1)
2024–	Indonesia	2	(0)
- * Club domestic league appearances and goals as of 31 October 2026 ‡ National team caps and goals as of 8 December 2025

Zanadin Fariz (born 31 May 2004) is an Indonesian professional footballer who plays as a midfielder for Super League club Persik Kediri and the Indonesia national team.

== Club career ==
=== Persis Solo ===
He was signed for Persis Solo to play in Liga 1 in the 2022 season. Zanadin made his league debut on 25 July 2022 in a match against Dewa United at the Moch. Soebroto Stadium, Magelang.

== International career ==
Zanadin earned his first international under-19 cap on 4 July 2022 against Brunei U19 in a 7–0 win in the 2022 AFF U-19 Youth Championship. On 16 September 2022, Zanadin scored his first international goal against Hong Kong U-20 in a 5–1 win in the 2023 AFC U-20 Asian Cup qualification. In October 2022, it was reported that Zanadin received a call-up from the Indonesia U20 for a training camp, in Turkey and Spain.

On 25 November 2024, Zanadin received a call-up to the preliminary squad to the Indonesia national team for the 2024 ASEAN Championship. He made his debut against Myanmar in a 1–0 victory.

== Career statistics ==
=== Club ===
As of 31 October 2026

Appearances and goals by club, season and competition
Club	Season	League			Cup		Continental		Other (Note: Appearances in Indonesia President's Cup)		Total	
Club	Season	Division	Apps	Goals	Apps	Goals	Apps	Goals	Apps	Goals	Apps	Goals
Persis Solo	2022–23	Liga 1	10	0	0	0	0	0	2	0	12	0
Persis Solo	2023–24	Liga 1	6	1	0	0	–		0	0	6	1
Persis Solo	2024–25	Liga 1	23	2	0	0	–		2	0	25	2
Persis Solo	2025–26	Super League	29	1	0	0	–		0	0	29	1
Persik Kediri	2026–27	Super League	8	1	0	0	–		0	0	8	1
Career total			76	5	0	0	0	0	4	0	80	5

=== International ===
As of match played 12 December 2024

Appearances and goals by national team and year
National team	Year	Apps	Goals
Indonesia	2024	2	0
Total		2	0

=== International goals ===
International under-20 goals

No.	Date	Venue	Opponent	Score	Result	Competition
1.	16 September 2022	Gelora Bung Tomo Stadium, Surabaya, Indonesia	Hong Kong	3–0	5–1	2023 AFC U-20 Asian Cup qualification

== Honours ==
Individual

- Super League Young Player of the Month: March 2026
