= Jordy Tutuarima =

Dutch footballer (born 1993)

Personal information
- Full name: Jordy Soleman Gradus Tutuarima
- Date of birth: 28 April 1993 (age 33)
- Place of birth: Velp, Netherlands
- Height: 1.69 m (5 ft 7 in)
- Position: Left-back

Team information
- Current team: GVVV

Youth career
- SC Elistha
- 2002–2012: NEC

Senior career*
Years	Team	Apps	(Gls)
2012–2014	NEC	4	(0)
2014	→ TOP Oss (loan)	2	(0)
2014–2015	Juliana '31	22	(0)
2015–2017	Telstar	62	(1)
2017–2021	De Graafschap	129	(2)
2021–2022	Apollon Smyrnis	17	(0)
2022–2023	PEC Zwolle	19	(1)
2023–2024	Noah	32	(0)
2025–2026	Persis Solo	23	(1)
2026–	GVVV	1	(0)

International career
2010	Netherlands U17	5	(0)
2011	Netherlands U18	3	(0)
- * Club domestic league appearances and goals as of 21 June 2026

Jordy Soleman Gradus Tutuarima (born 28 April 1993) is a Dutch professional footballer who plays as a left-back for Tweede Divisie club GVVV.

He formerly played for TOP Oss, NEC, Telstar, De Graafschap, PEC Zwolle, and Noah.

== Club career ==
=== NEC, Oss and Juliana '31 ===
Born in Velp, Tutuarima started his youth career at local club SC Elistha then moved to the junior team NEC and played in the club for 10 years. In the 2012–13 season, he was given the opportunity to obtain a contract to acquire and at the end of August, he signed a one-year contract with an option on another season.

In 2012 Tutuarima joined NEC where he met up Navarone Foor, a fellow player of Indonesian descent and a friend since childhood. On 10 October 2012, he made his professional debut in a home game against Heracles Almelo replacing Leroy George in the Eredivisie.

On 30 January 2014, he was loaned to FC Oss. After his contract with NEC ended, Tutuarima moved to amateur club Juliana '31 after having trialled with JVC Cuijk.

=== Telstar ===
From the summer of 2015, it was first announced that he would play for JVC Cuijk but he then opted for a move to Koninklijke HFC.

On 6 May 2015, however, it was announced he signed a one-year contract with Telstar, marking his return to professional football.

=== De Graafschap ===
On 10 May 2017, Tutuarima signed a two-year contract with De Graafschap with an option of a third season.

=== Apollon Smyrnis ===
On 28 June 2021, Greek Super League club Apollon Smyrnis announced Tutuarima had signed a contract with the club, with the duration of the contract and the shirt number not being disclosed.

=== PEC Zwolle ===
Tutuarima joined newly relegated Eerste Divisie club PEC Zwolle on 11 June 2022, signing a two-year contract. His contract with PEC Zwolle was terminated by mutual consent on 12 July 2023.

== International career ==
Tutuarima was called up to the Netherlands U-17 team. But when the junior competition, he got injured torn ligaments and muscle, and made him disappear from football for fifteen months. He only played four times for the Netherlands U-17 team. he became the Netherlands U-17, tournaments competed four countries: Georgia U-17, Czech Republic U-17 and Ukraine U-17, in March 2010.

== Personal life ==
Born in the Netherlands, Tutuarima is of Moluccan descent.
