= Giovani Numberi =

Indonesian professional footballer

Personal information
- Full name: Giovani Jorim Herzon Dacosta Numberi
- Date of birth: 22 April 2000 (age 26)
- Place of birth: Jakarta, Indonesia
- Height: 1.73 m (5 ft 8 in)
- Position: Full-back

Team information
- Current team: Madura United
- Number: 15

Youth career
- 2019: Persipura Jayapura
- 2019–2021: PON Papua

Senior career*
Years	Team	Apps	(Gls)
2021	Dogiyai		
2022	Toli		
2022	Persipura Jayapura	4	(0)
2023–2024	PSIS Semarang	31	(1)
2024–2026	Persis Solo	36	(0)
2026–	Madura United	3	(0)
- * Club domestic league appearances and goals as of 7 February 2026

Giovani Jorim Herzon Dacosta Numberi (born 22 April 2000) is an Indonesian professional footballer who plays as a full-back for Super League club Madura United.

== Early life ==
Born in 2000, Giovani was born in Jakarta, Indonesia.

== Club career ==
=== Youth career ===
As a youth player, Giovani joined PON Papua.

=== Persipura Jayapura ===
In 2022, Giovani is contracted by Persipura Jayapura to sail in Liga 2.

=== PSIS Semarang ===
On 13 May 2023, after going through the trial, Giovani was contracted by PSIS Semarang.

== Career statistics ==
=== Club ===
As of 4 January 2026

Club	Season	League			Cup		Continental		Other		Total	
Club	Season	Division	Apps	Goals	Apps	Goals	Apps	Goals	Apps	Goals	Apps	Goals
Persipura Jayapura	2022–23	Liga 2	4	0	0	0	–		0	0	4	0
PSIS Semarang	2023–24	Liga 1	31	1	0	0	–		0	0	31	1
Persis Solo	2024–25	Liga 1	20	0	0	0	–		0	0	20	0
Persis Solo	2025–26	Super League	16	0	0	0	–		0	0	16	0
Career total			71	1	0	0	0	0	0	0	71	1
