= Arapenta Poerba =

Indonesian footballer

Personal information
- Full name: Arapenta Lingka Poerba
- Date of birth: 1 November 1998 (age 28)
- Place of birth: Bekasi, Indonesia
- Height: 1.75 m (5 ft 9 in)
- Position: Midfielder

Team information
- Current team: Garudayaksa
- Number: 18

Youth career
- 2017: Bali United U-19

Senior career*
Years	Team	Apps	(Gls)
2018–2022	Bali United	5	(0)
2018	→ Sulut United (loan)	8	(0)
2021	→ Persis Solo (loan)	10	(0)
2022–2024	Persis Solo	44	(1)
2024–2025	Dewa United	5	(0)
2025–2026	Persis Solo	11	(0)
2026–	Garudayaksa	7	(0)
- * Club domestic league appearances and goals as of 18:00, 6 September 2026 (UTC)

Arapenta Lingka Poerba (born 1 November 1998) is an Indonesian professional footballer who plays as an attacking or central midfielder for Super League club Garudayaksa.

== Club career ==
=== Bali United ===
On 18 January 2018, Arapenta officially signed a year contract with Liga 1 club Bali United after being promoted from Bali United U-19 and introduced as a trial player on 4 December 2017. He made his official debut with Bali United in a 3–0 win against Blitar United in Piala Indonesia when he came as a substitute for Miftahul Hamdi. He made his official debut in Liga 1 for Bali United, replacing Fadil Sausu in the match against Badak Lampung on 22 October 2019.

==== Sulut United (loan) ====
On 31 March 2018, Arapenta was loaned out to Sulut United for the 2018 season along with two other players to gain first-team experience.

==== Persis Solo (loan) ====
On 3 May 2021, Arapenta was loaned out to Persis Solo for the 2021–22 season. Arapenta made his first 2021–22 Liga 2 debut on 26 September 2021, coming on as a starter in a 2–0 win with PSG Pati at the Manahan Stadium, Surakarta.

== Honours ==
Bali United

- Liga 1: 2019

Persis Solo

- Liga 2: 2021

Garudayaksa

- Championship: 2025–26
