= Rian Miziar =

Indonesian footballer (born 1990)

Personal information
- Full name: Rian Miziar
- Date of birth: 13 October 1990 (age 36)
- Place of birth: West Bangka, Indonesia
- Height: 1.78 m (5 ft 10 in)
- Position: Centre-back

Senior career*
| Years | Team | Apps | (Gls) |
| 2011–2013 | Barito Putera | 28 | (0) |
| 2015–2017 | Persita Tangerang | 39 | (0) |
| 2018–2019 | Martapura | 12 | (0) |
| 2019–2020 | Aceh United | 19 | (0) |
| 2021 | Muba Babel United | 16 | (0) |
| 2021–2026 | Persis Solo | 55 | (0) |
- * Club domestic league appearances and goals as of 1 February 2025

Rian Miziar (born 13 October 1990) is an Indonesian professional footballer who plays as a centre-back.

== Club career ==
=== Early career ===
Rian Miziar began his professional football career with several clubs in the Indonesian lower divisions. He had stints with Martapura, Aceh United, and Muba Babel United, primarily in Liga 2.

=== Persis Solo ===
On 4 May 2021, Rian signed with Persis Solo ahead of the 2021 Liga 2 season. He helped the club secure promotion to Liga 1 by winning the 2021 Liga 2 title.

In the 2022–23 season, he made 16 appearances (14 starts) and played a total of 1,135 minutes.

In May 2023, he signed a contract extension with Persis Solo until May 2024, with an option for a one-year extension.

During the 2023–24 Liga 1 season, Rian played 2,697 minutes in 31 matches — the highest for a local player in the team.

== Style of play ==
Rian is known for his fighting spirit, leadership, and consistency. He has often been described as a player who brings “mentalitas pejuang” (warrior mentality) to the team. He has also captained the team on several occasions.

== Personal life ==
In June 2025, Rian donated his Liga 1 bronze medal to the Museum Titik Nol Pasoepati, a supporter-led museum documenting the history of Persis Solo.

== Honours ==
=== Club ===
- Persis Solo
  - Liga 2: 2021
