= Irfan Jauhari =

Indonesian footballer

Personal information
- Full name: Irfan Jauhari
- Date of birth: 31 January 2001 (age 25)
- Place of birth: Ngawi, Indonesia
- Height: 1.73 m (5 ft 8 in)
- Positions: Winger; forward

Team information
- Current team: PSMS Medan
- Number: 7

Youth career
- 2018: BJL 2000
- 2019: Bali United

Senior career*
Years	Team	Apps	(Gls)
2020–2021	Bali United	0	(0)
2021–2026	Persis Solo	78	(5)
2022	→ Persija Jakarta (loan)	15	(5)
2026–	PSMS Medan	1	(0)

International career^{‡}
2020	Indonesia U19	7	(2)
2022–2023	Indonesia U23	15	(2)
Medal record
Men's football
Representing Indonesia
Southeast Asian Games
Gold medal – first place	2023 Cambodia	Team
Bronze medal – third place	2021 Vietnam	Team
AFF U-23 Championship
Runner-up	2023 Thailand	Team
- * Club domestic league appearances and goals as of 13 September 2026 ‡ National team caps and goals as of 19 August 2023

Irfan Jauhari (born 31 January 2001) is an Indonesian professional footballer who plays as a winger or forward for Championship club PSMS Medan.

== Club career ==
=== Early career ===
Jauhari started playing football at fourth grade. He trained with Football School in Ngawi. Jauhari played for High School club BJL 2000, due to his impressive performance, he was given a trial by Bali United, which he passed the youth squad. He was awarded the best player in 2019 Liga 1 U-18 competition.

=== Bali United ===
On 23 February 2020, Jauhari was promoted to the senior team and signed a three-year contract for Bali United. Bali United's CEO Yabes Tanuri, revealed that he would loan out Jauhari in order for him to earn playing time. In April 2021 he was loaned out to Persis Solo.

=== Persis Solo ===
On 28 April 2021, Jauhari signed for Persis Solo to play in 2021-22 Liga 2 season. On 26 September, Jauhari made his league debut, starting in 2 - 0 win against PSG Pati. He was subbed off in the 55th minute, for suffering an injury which would saw him recover for two-weeks. On 15 December, he scored his first league goal in a 4 - 3 lose against RANS Cilegon. On 22 December, Jauhari coming on as a substituted in the second half, and success give assists an opening goal by Ferdinand Sinaga in Persis's 2 - 0 win over Persiba Balikpapan at Pakansari Stadium, with this result, Persis Solo successfully advanced to the semi-finals of Liga 2. He had a good season in this season with 11 league appearances, 1 goals and 1 assist, while helping Persis Solo win the championship Liga 2 this season.

==== Persija Jakarta (loan) ====
On 5 January 2022, Jauhari signed a contract with Liga 1 club Persija Jakarta on loan from Persis Solo. Jauhari made his league debut in a 2 - 1 win against PSIS Semarang a day later as a substitute for Riko Simanjuntak in the 90th minute at the Kapten I Wayan Dipta Stadium, Gianyar. On 19 February, he scored his first Liga 1 goal in a 2 - 1 win against Persik Kediri. Four days later, he scored the opening goal for the club in a 1 - 1 draw over Barito Putera at Kompyang Sujana Stadium. On 6 March, Jauhari scored equalizer in a 2 - 1 lose over his former youth club Bali United. Bali United's coach Stefano Cugurra praised the impressive performance shown by Jauhari, he considered that Jauhari would shine even more with Persija Jakarta. a week later, he scored another the opening goal for the club, scoring from header in a 0 - 4 win against Persikabo 1973. On 21 March, he scored in a 3 - 1 win over PSM Makassar. During his time with Persija, he scored five goals in 15 appearances for 646 minutes in the half season of 2021–22 Liga 1. He returned to Persis Solo, after his loan status at Persija was completed.

==== Return to Persis Solo ====
After his loan ended with Persija Jakarta and he returned to Persis Solo. He made his league debut on 28 August 2022 in a match against Borneo Samarinda, coming as a substitutes in second half for Ryo Matsumura. Jauhari scored his first goal for the club on 29 September, opening the scoring in a 1 - 1 draw against PSM Makassar, this result makes Persis Solo unbeaten in 4 home matches. On 24 December, Jauhari was pulled off in the 75th minute, replaced by Alfath Fathier in a match against Persik Kediri, due to an injury, he had to receive further treatment. After being sidelined for three weeks, Jauhari is ready to return to play for the club, he is recovering from his injury, previously diagnosed with a bilateral varicocele and had undergone surgery at the end of the first round of Liga 1. Due to the injury, he had to miss the first two matches of the second round.

On 17 February 2023, Jauhari scored the equalizer in injury time of second half and saved Persis Solo from losing to PSIS Semarang, score draw 1 - 1. Jauhari scored his third goal of the season in a 2 - 3 away win against RANS Nusantara on 10 March.

== International career ==
Jauhari earned his first U-19 international cap on 5 September 2020 in 3 - 0 loss against Bulgaria. On 11 September 2020, Jauhari scored his first goal for the U-19 team in 3 - 3 draw against Saudi Arabia.

== Career statistics ==
=== Club ===
As of match played 13 September 2026

Appearances and goals by club, season and competition
Club	Season	League			Cup		Continental		Other		Total	
Club	Season	Division	Apps	Goals	Apps	Goals	Apps	Goals	Apps	Goals	Apps	Goals
Bali United	2020	Liga 1	0	0	0	0	-		0	0	0	0
Persis Solo	2021	Liga 2	11	1	0	0	-		0	0	11	1
Persis Solo	2022–23	Liga 1	19	3	0	0	-		3 (Note: Appearances in Indonesia President's Cup)	0	22	3
Persis Solo	2023–24	Liga 1	8	0	0	0	-		0	0	8	0
Persis Solo	2024–25	Liga 1	21	0	0	0	-		0	0	21	0
Persis Solo	2025–26	Super League	19	1	0	0	–		0	0	19	1
Persija Jakarta (loan)	2021–22	Liga 1	15	5	0	0	-		0	0	15	5
PSMS Medan	2026–27	Championship	1	0	0	0	-		0	0	1	0
Career total			94	10	0	0	0	0	3	0	97	10

=== International goals ===
International under-23 goals

Goal	Date	Venue	Opponent	Score	Result	Competition
1.	29 April 2023	Olympic Stadium, Phnom Penh, Cambodia	Philippines	2–0	3–0	2023 Southeast Asian Games
2.	16 May 2023	Olympic Stadium, Phnom Penh, Cambodia	Thailand	3–2	5–2	2023 Southeast Asian Games

== Honours ==
Persis Solo

- Liga 2: 2021

Indonesia U-23

- SEA Games gold medal: 2023; bronze medal: 2021
- AFF U-23 Championship runner-up: 2023

Individual

- Elite Pro Academy U18 Best Player: 2019
