= 2026–27 Super League (Indonesia) =

17th season of top division football in Indonesia

Super League
- Season: 2026–27
- Dates: 4 September 2026 – May 2027
- Matches: 89
- Goals: 244 (2.74 per match)
- Top goalscorer: Alexander Jeremejeff (6 goals)
- Biggest home win: Bali United 6–1 Persijap (10 October 2026); Bali United 5–0 Garudayaksa (21 October 2026)
- Biggest away win: PSIM 0–4 Persija (10 October 2026); Persik 1–5 Persita (31 October 2026)
- Highest scoring: Bali United 6–1 Persijap (13 September 2026)
- Longest winning run: Persija (4 games)
- Longest unbeaten run: Bhayangkara Presisi (7 games)
- Longest winless run: Persijap (10 games)
- Longest losing run: Persijap (6 games)
- Highest attendance: 58,961; Persija 2–1 Persib (12 September 2026)
- Lowest attendance: 474; Garudayaksa 0–2 Persik (11 September 2026)
- Total attendance: 480,586
- Average attendance: 7,621

The 2026–27 Super League (also known as the 2026–27 BRI Super League for sponsorship reasons) is the second season of the Super League under its current name and the 17th season of top-flight Indonesian football league since its establishment in 2008. The season began on 4 September 2026 and will conclude on May 2027.

Persib were the defending champions after winning their 4th Super League title and 10th overall Indonesian top-flight football title in the previous season.

== Overview ==
18 teams will compete in the league – the fifteen teams from the previous season and three teams promoted from the Championship.

Garudayaksa and PSS became the first two teams to be promoted in the final matchweek held on 2 and 3 May 2026. The victory over Persikad made Garudayaksa compete in the top division for the first time in the team's history, while PSS returned to the top division after a season's absence after defeating PSIS.

The last team to be promoted was Isenmulang Kalteng (formerly Adhyaksa Banten) after winning against Persipura in the promotion playoff on 8 May 2026, which marked the first season in the top division in the team's history.

PSBS and Semen Padang became the first two teams to be relegated after both spent two seasons in the top division. In the matchweek 31, PSBS suffered a defeat to Persebaya on 2 May 2026 while Semen Padang lost to Dewa United Banten on 3 May 2026. The last team to be relegated is Persis Solo in the final matchweek, despite their win over Persita, in the other match Madura United defeated PSM Makassar, which caused Persis confirmed relegation, and ended their four seasons in the top division.

== Teams ==
=== Changes ===
The following teams changed division since the 2025–26 season.

| ▲ Promoted from Championship | ▼ Relegated to Championship |
|---|---|
| Garudayaksa; PSS; Isenmulang Kalteng (Note: formerly Adhyaksa Banten) | PSBS; Semen Padang; Persis |

=== Name changes and relocated teams ===
Clubs can no longer relocate their home base once they have obtained an I-League license. Any club that violates this rule will be deducted two points.

- Adhyaksa Banten has relocated to Central Kalimantan and will be using the Tuah Pahoe Stadium in Palangkaraya as their home base starting from this season. As part of the relocation, the club has been renamed Isenmulang Kalteng Football Club, to reflect the province's culture, with the new identity being ratified at the 2026 PSSI General Congress.
- Malut United has relocated to Central Java and will be using the Jatidiri Stadium in Semarang as their home base starting from this season. As part of the relocation, the club has been renamed Java United, with the new identity being ratified at the 2026 PSSI General Congress.

=== Teams by province ===
| Number | Province | Team(s) |
|---|---|---|
| 4 | East Java | Arema, Madura United, Persebaya, and Persik |
| 2 | Banten | Dewa United Banten and Persita |
| 2 | Central Java | Java United and Persijap |
| 2 | Special Region of Yogyakarta | PSIM and PSS |
| 2 | West Java | Garudayaksa and Persib |
| 1 | Bali | Bali United |
| 1 | Central Kalimantan | Isenmulang Kalteng |
| 1 | East Kalimantan | Borneo Samarinda |
| 1 | Jakarta | Persija |
| 1 | Lampung | Bhayangkara Presisi |
| 1 | South Sulawesi | PSM |

=== Location and stadiums ===
Locations of teams in the 2026–27 Super League
Locations of teams in the 2026–27 Super League from Java region

| Team | Location | Stadium | Capacity | 2025–26 position |
|---|---|---|---|---|
| Arema | Malang | Kanjuruhan | 21,708 | 9th |
| Bali United | Gianyar | Kapten I Wayan Dipta | 18,000 | 8th |
| Bhayangkara Presisi | Bandar Lampung | Sumpah Pemuda | 15,000 | 5th |
| Borneo Samarinda | Samarinda | Segiri | 12,979 | 2nd |
| Dewa United Banten | Serang | Banten International (Note: Dewa United Banten also registered the Indomilk Arena at Tangerang as an alternate venue.) | 30,000 | 7th |
| Garudayaksa^{↑} | Bogor | Pakansari | 31,000 | 1st (Championship) |
| Isenmulang Kalteng^{↑} | Palangkaraya | Tuah Pahoe (Note: Due to the 2026 Southeast Asian haze, Isenmulang Kalteng was forced to hold their home games for at least the first half of the season at various stadiums, among others Sumpah Pemuda Stadium in Bandar Lampung (vs. Persebaya Surabaya in Matchweek 4), Maguwoharjo Stadium in Sleman (vs. Java United in Matchweek 6), and Kapten I Wayan Dipta Stadium in Gianyar (vs. PSIM Yogyakarta in Matchweek 7).) | 10,000 | 3rd (Championship) |
| Java United | Semarang | Jatidiri | 18,872 | 6th |
| Madura United | Pamekasan | Gelora Ratu Pamelingan | 7,372 | 14th |
| Persebaya | Surabaya | Gelora Bung Tomo | 46,806 | 4th |
| Persib | Bandung | Gelora Bandung Lautan Api (Note: Persib played their home games between October and November at Si Jalak Harupat Stadium in Soreang because Gelora Bandung Lautan Api Stadium was undergoing major pitch works.) | 37,654 | 1st |
| Persija | Jakarta | Jakarta International (Note: Persija also registered the Gelora Bung Karno Stadium as an alternate venue.) (Note: Persija played their home game against Java United on September 19 at Kapten I Wayan Dipta Stadium in Gianyar due to Gelora Bung Karno Stadium being unavailable in preparation for the 2026 FIFA ASEAN Cup and Jakarta International Stadium being prepared for a concert by the Weeknd the week after.) (Note: Persija played their home game against Arema on October 21 at Patriot Candrabhaga Stadium in Bekasi due to Gelora Bung Karno Stadium hosting a concert by Kanye West three days after the match and Jakarta International Stadium being under maintenance following a concert by Avenged Sevenfold that was held 11 days earlier.) | 82,000 | 3rd |
| Persijap | Jepara | Gelora Bumi Kartini | 8,643 | 13th |
| Persik | Kediri | Brawijaya | 10,000 | 12th |
| Persita | Tangerang | Indomilk Arena (Note: Persita played their home games at Banten International Stadium in Serang until November because Indomilk Arena was still under maintenance from hurricane damage.) | 10,985 | 10th |
| PSIM | Yogyakarta | Sultan Agung, at Bantul (Note: Due to Mandala Krida Stadium not meeting the league requirements, PSIM will play their home matches at Sultan Agung Stadium in Bantul.) | 25,000 | 11th |
| PSM | Makassar | Gelora B.J. Habibie, at Parepare (Note: Due to the lack of available stadiums in Makassar, PSM will play their home matches at the Gelora B.J. Habibie Stadium in Parepare.) | 8,547 | 15th |
| PSS^{↑} | Sleman | Maguwoharjo | 20,651 | 2nd (Championship) |

| ^{↑} | Promoted from the Championship |

Location notes:

=== Personnel and kits ===
Note: Flags indicate national team as has been defined under FIFA eligibility rules. Players and coaches may hold more than one non-FIFA nationality.

| Team | Manager | Captain | Kit manufacturer | Kit sponsors | |
| Team | Manager | Captain | Kit manufacturer | Main | Other(s) |
|---|---|---|---|---|---|
| Arema | (Brazil national football team) André Caldas (caretaker) | (Indonesia national football team) Johan Alfarizi | (Indonesia) Etams | balé by BTN^{2} | List: Front^{2}: Lapakgaming; Back: RANS; Sleeves: TCT; Shorts: None |
| Bali United | (Netherlands national football team) Johnny Jansen | (Indonesia national football team) Ricky Fajrin | (Germany) Adidas | Indofood | List: Front: KB Bank, Trima+, Mandiri Coal, Mandiri Services, Mandiri Contractor, Mandiri Tranship, Salonpas, Alderon, YCAB Foundation; Back: CBN Fiber, Indomie, Riung; Sleeves: None; Shorts: None |
| Bhayangkara Presisi | (Spain national football team) Óscar Bruzón | (Mali national football team) Moussa Sidibé | (Indonesia) Mills | None | List: Front: Satu Hati^{3}, AMSO, JungleSea, Octopus United; Back: None; Sleeves: Jasa Raharja, Mitra Orphys; Shorts: None |
| Borneo Samarinda | (Brazil national football team) Sérgio Farias | (Colombia national football team) Juan Villa | (Indonesia) Etams | Nitrea | List: Front: ARTCO, balé by BTN; Back: Extra Joss; Sleeves: Se’Indonesia; Shorts: None |
| Dewa United Banten | (Brazil national football team) Osmar Loss | (Indonesia national football team) Ricky Kambuaya | (Indonesia) DRX | BAIC Indonesia | List: Front: Cow Play Cow Moo; Back: Carstensz Residence and Mall BSD, Le Minerale; Sleeves: JHL Solitaire; Shorts: None |
| Garudayaksa | (Serbia national football team) Miloš Joksić | (Indonesia national football team) Wahyu Prasetyo | (Indonesia) DRX | Zentara Technologies | List: Front: None; Back: LXVR, Garuda TV; Sleeves: Adamare Villa; Shorts: None |
| Isenmulang Kalteng | (Indonesia national football team) Mundari Karya | (Indonesia national football team) Ardi Ramdani | (Indonesia) PGRPN | Bank Kalteng | List: Front: Farmel; Back: Pakar IPAL Indonesia, Halo Dayak; Sleeves: None; Shorts: None |
| Java United | (Brazil national football team) Fábio Lefundes | (Brazil national football team) Gustavo França | (Indonesia) RMB Apparel | None^{4} | List: Front: None; Back: Le Minerale; Sleeves: Lemonilo, Oxygen Denim; Shorts: None |
| Madura United | (Portugal national football team) Zé Gomes | (Brazil national football team) Lulinha | (Indonesia) XTen | Weha Group^{5} | List: Front^{5}: Media Artha Proteksi, SOMA, POJUR, Titan Infra Energy, Nusakita, Trans Utama Kargo; Back: EJP Group; Sleeves: Mitra Orphys; Shorts: None |
| Persebaya | (Portugal national football team) Bernardo Tavares | (Mexico national football team) Francisco Rivera | (Indonesia) AZA^{1} | Kapal Api | List: Front: Implora, balé by BTN, Extra Joss, Indomie, Antangin; Back: Citicon, MPM Honda Distributor; Sleeves: None; Shorts: None |
| Persib | (Croatia national football team) Igor Tolić | (Indonesia national football team) Marc Klok | (Spain) Kelme | Indofood^{6} | List: Front: Trima+, Se'Indonesia, FOOM Unity, Le Minerale, Greenfields, Teh Pucuk Harum, Bank BJB, Combiphar; Back: Kopi ABC; Sleeves: Semen Kujang, Indomie, Nex AI; Shorts: None |
| Persija | (South Korea national football team) Shin Tae-yong | (Indonesia national football team) Rizky Ridho | (Germany) Adidas | Macan Kemayoran | List: Front: Se’Indonesia, Bank Jakarta, PAM Jaya, Indomie, Bakrie Untuk Negeri; Back: Upbit, PStore, Hongsam Ball, Le Minerale; Sleeves: LIMA by Anargya; Shorts: None |
| Persijap | (Spain) Juan Cortés | (Spain national football team) Tiri | (Indonesia) Antfarm | Oasis Waters | List: Front: Oasis+, Oasis Blu, Mie Sedaap; Back: Honbun Bakery; Sleeves: None; Shorts: None |
| Persik | (Spain national football team) Marcos Reina | (Indonesia national football team) Ezra Walian | (Germany) Adidas | Athletes For Good | List: Front: None; Back: Akeo Demineral; Sleeves: None; Shorts: None |
| Persita | (Spain national football team) Carlos Peña | (Uzbekistan national football team) Javlon Guseynov | (Indonesia) 1953^{1} | Indomilk | List: Front: Moya; Back: Aetra Tangerang, Netive, Palang Merah Indonesia, KABOOM Creative; Sleeves: Indomie; Shorts: None |
| PSIM | (Serbia) Risto Vidaković | (Argentina national football team) Franco Ramos Mingo | (Germany) Adidas | DANA | List: Front: Taro Snack, Grab, Shopee, Itemku, Russ & Co, Mitra Bukalapak; Back: Lapakgaming, Superbank; Sleeves: None; Shorts: None |
| PSM | (Bosnia and Herzegovina national football team) Darije Kalezić | (Montenegro national football team) Dušan Lagator | (Germany) Adidas | Honda^{7} | List: Front: Astra Motor; Back: Bank Sulselbar; Sleeves: None; Shorts: None |
| PSS | vacant | (Brazil national football team) Cleberson | (Indonesia) Scorelab^{1} | Amman Mineral | List: Front: Cleo Pure Water, Hara Chicken, Indomie, MedcoEnergi, Ithaca Resources; Back: Rumah Sakit JIH Yogyakarta; Sleeves: None; Shorts: None |

1. Apparel made by club.
2. Arema lacked a main sponsor and only had Sigma Auto as their secondary front-of-shirt sponsor for their I.League Cup matches.
3. For Matchweek 2 only.
4. Java United were sponsored by Polytron in their first three matches.
5. Madura United were sponsored by Warung Madura (main), MP Store and balé by BTN (front) for their I.League Cup matches.
6. Persib were sponsored by Indomie for their ACL2 matches and Nex AI for their ACC matches.
7. PSM were sponsored by Bosowa Corp for their I.League Cup matches.

=== Coaching changes ===
==== Pre-season ====
| Team | Outgoing head coach | Manner | Date of vacancy | Replaced by | Date of arrival |
|---|---|---|---|---|---|
| Garudayaksa | (Indonesia) Widodo Cahyono Putro | Signed by PSIS | 18 May 2026 | (Serbia) Miloš Joksić | 21 July 2026 |
| Madura United | (Indonesia) Rakhmat Basuki | End of interim spell | 23 May 2026 | (Portugal) Zé Gomes | 9 June 2026 |
| PSM | (Indonesia) Ahmad Amiruddin | End of interim spell | 23 May 2026 | (Bosnia and Herzegovina) Darije Kalezić | 10 June 2026 |
| Persib | (Croatia) Bojan Hodak | Became technical advisor | 25 May 2026 | (Croatia) Igor Tolić | 25 May 2026 |
| Persija | (Brazil) Maurício Souza | End of contract | 26 May 2026 | (South Korea) Shin Tae-yong | 8 June 2026 |
| PSS | (Indonesia) Ansyari Lubis | Demoted to assistant | 31 May 2026 | (Netherlands) Pieter Huistra | 1 June 2026 |
| Borneo Samarinda | (Brazil) Fábio Lefundes | Mutual consent | 7 June 2026 | (Portugal) Mauro Jerónimo | 10 June 2026 |
| Dewa United Banten | (Netherlands national football team) Jan Olde Riekerink | Sacked | 4 July 2026 | (Brazil national football team) Osmar Loss | 25 July 2026 |
| Java United | (Indonesia national football team) Hendri Susilo | Signed by Barito Putera | 8 August 2026 | (Brazil national football team) Fábio Lefundes | 9 August 2026 |
| Bhayangkara Presisi | (Northern Ireland national football team) Paul Munster | Sacked | 11 August 2026 | (Spain national football team) Óscar Bruzón | 12 August 2026 |
| Persijap | (Portugal national football team) Mário Lemos | Became technical director | 15 August 2026 | (Spain national football team) Juan Cortés | 15 August 2026 |
| Isenmulang Kalteng | (Indonesia national football team) Ade Suhendra | Demoted to assistant | 2 September 2026 | (Indonesia national football team) Mundari Karya | 2 September 2026 |

==== During the season ====
| Team | Outgoing head coach | Manner | Date of vacancy | Week | Position in table | Replaced by | Date of appointment |
|---|---|---|---|---|---|---|---|
| Persijap | (Spain) Juan Cortés | Became technical director | 15 September 2026 | 2 | 16th | (Portugal) Mário Lemos | 15 September 2026 |
| Persijap | (Portugal) Mário Lemos | Sacked | 15 October 2026 | 4 | 17th | (Indonesia) Antônio Cláudio (caretaker) | 15 October 2026 |
| PSIM | (Netherlands national football team) Jean-Paul van Gastel | Sacked | 17 October 2026 | 5 | 16th | (Indonesia) Gustur Cahyo Utomo (caretaker) | 17 October 2026 |
| Persijap | (Indonesia) Antônio Cláudio (caretaker) | End of caretaker role | 23 October 2026 | 6 | 18th | (Spain) Juan Cortés | 23 October 2026 |
| Arema | (Brazil national football team) Marquinhos Santos | Sacked | 23 October 2026 | 6 | 12th | (Brazil) André Caldas (caretaker) | 23 October 2026 |
| PSIM | (Indonesia) Gustur Cahyo Utomo (caretaker) | End of caretaker role | 31 October 2026 | 7 | 17th | (Serbia) Risto Vidaković | 31 October 2026 |
| Borneo Samarinda | (Portugal) Mauro Jerónimo | Sacked | 9 November 2026 | 9 | 11th | (Brazil national football team) Sérgio Farias | 10 November 2026 |
| PSS | (Netherlands national football team) Pieter Huistra | Sacked | 16 November 2026 | 9 | 16th | | |

== Foreign players ==
Starting last season, I-League announced an increase in the foreign player quota to eleven foreign players. However, only nine foreign players are allowed to be included in the matchday squad for a single match, with seven foreign players on the field and two foreign players on the bench.

- Player names printed in **bold** indicate that the player was registered during the mid-season transfer window.
- Names of former players printed in italics are players who left the squad or departed the club in a given season, after the pre-season transfer window, or during the mid-season transfer window, and have played at least once.

| Team | Player 1 | Player 2 | Player 3 | Player 4 | Player 5 | Player 6 | Player 7 | Player 8 | Player 9 | Player 10 | Player 11 | Unregistered players^{1} | Former players |
|---|---|---|---|---|---|---|---|---|---|---|---|---|---|
| Arema | (Brazil) Betinho | (Brazil) Careca | (Brazil) Diego Landis | (Brazil) Gabriel Silva | (Brazil) Gustavo França | (Brazil) Gustavo Henrique | (Brazil) Marcos Vinicius | (Brazil) Matheus Blade | (Brazil) Walisson Maia | (Colombia) Julián Guevara | (Nigeria) Samuel Otusanya | | |
| Bali United | (Australia) Brandon Wilson | (Bonaire) Jort van der Sande | (Brazil) Queven | (Croatia) Marko Dugandžić | (Finland) Thomas Lam | (Japan) Teppei Yachida | (Netherlands) Mike Hauptmeijer | (Netherlands) Remco Balk | (Netherlands) Thijmen Goppel | (Netherlands) Tim Receveur | (New Zealand) Jay Herdman | (Brazil) João Ferrari | |
| Bhayangkara Presisi | (Argentina) Kevin Sibille | (Argentina) Mauricio Vera | (Brazil) Allano | (Brazil) Moisés Gaúcho | (Costa Rica) Jefferson Brenes | (Denmark) Anton Søjberg | (Mali) Moussa Sidibé | (North Macedonia) Milan Ristovski | (North Macedonia) Nehar Sadiki | (Uruguay) Matías Ocampo | | | |
| Borneo Samarinda | (Angola) Kadú | (Argentina) Marcos Astina | (Brazil) Arthur Moura | (Brazil) Christian Matheus | (Brazil) Gabriel Oliveira | (Brazil) Iago Mendonça | (Brazil) Rodrigo Varanda | (Brazil) Sousa | (Colombia) Juan Villa | (Mali) Moussa Diarra | (Spain) Rubio | (Brazil) Carlos Patrick (Brazil) Caxambu (France) Kablan N'Goma (Japan) Rei Okada (Poland) Daniel Mikołajewski | (South Africa) Njabulo Blom |
| Dewa United Banten | (Argentina) Alexis Messidoro | (Brazil) Denílson | (Brazil) Jean Mangabeira | (Brazil) Johnathan | (Brazil) Pedro Augusto | (Jamaica) Damion Lowe | (Japan) Taisei Marukawa | (Morocco) Noah Sadaoui | (Netherlands) Nick Kuipers | (Netherlands) Sonny Stevens | (South Korea) Ko Myeong-seok | | (Brazil) Carlos Iury |
| Garudayaksa | (Australia) Carlo Armiento | (Brazil) Carlos Iury | (Brazil) Paulo Ricardo | (Czech Republic) Christian Frýdek | (Haiti) Jayro Jean | (Japan) Ryo Matsumura | (Mexico) Brian Rubio | (Serbia) Aleksandar Busnić | (Serbia) Filip Stamenković | (Slovakia) Dominik Holec | | | (Niger) Najeeb Yakubu |
| Isenmulang Kalteng^{2} | (Bolivia) Adriel Fernández | (Brazil) Douglas Cruz | (Brazil) Léo Lelis | (Brazil) Lucas Frigeri | (Brazil) Rafael Ribeiro | (Brazil) Sergio Mendonça | (Brazil) Vinícius Baiano | (The Gambia) Modou Manneh | (Mali) Makan Konaté | (Philippines) Kenji Nishioka | (Portugal) Adilson Silva | | |
| Java United | (Brazil) Ciro Alves | (Brazil) David da Silva | (Brazil) Gustavo Almeida | (Brazil) Gustavo França | (Brazil) Jonata Machado | (Brazil) Jorge Meurer | (Brazil) Kaio Nunes | (Brazil) Lukas Brambilla | (Brazil) Vander Tavares | (Japan) Kei Hirose | (Senegal) Christian Gomis | | (Brazil) Vico |
| Madura United | (Brazil) Iran Júnior | (Brazil) Jajá | (Brazil) Lulinha | (Brazil) Mendonça | (Bulgaria) Dimitar Mitkov | (Guinea-Bissau) Balotelli | (Netherlands) Jasey Wehrmann | (Netherlands) Jordy Wehrmann | (Paraguay) Danilo Santacruz | (Portugal) Pedro Monteiro | (Timor-Leste) Gali Freitas | | |
| Persebaya | (Brazil) Alex Martins | (Brazil) Gledson Paixão | (Brazil) Jefferson | (Brazil) Matheus Lagoa | (Brazil) Wálber | (Cape Verde) Yuran Fernandes | (Republic of the Congo) Yann Mabella | (Mexico) Francisco Rivera | (North Macedonia) Risto Mitrevski | (Portugal) Diogo Ramalho | (Portugal) Miguel Pereira | | |
| Persib^{3} | (Argentina) Luciano Guaycochea | (Argentina) Mariano Peralta | (Argentina) Patricio Matricardi | (Bosnia and Herzegovina) Luka Menalo | (Brazil) Berguinho | (Brazil) Júlio César | (Brazil) Uilliam Barros | (Croatia) Danijel Lončar | (France) Gabriel Mutombo | (Japan) Gakuto Notsuda | (Montenegro) Balša Sekulić | | |
| Persija | (Bosnia and Herzegovina) Kerim Memija | (Bosnia and Herzegovina) Stjepan Lončar | (Brazil) Fábio Calonego | (Croatia) Denis Kolinger | (Croatia) Ivan Mamut | (Japan) Kyohei Yoshino | (Serbia) Radovan Pankov | (South Korea) Kwon Chang-hoon | (Sweden) Alexander Jeremejeff | | | | |
| Persijap | (Brazil) China | (Brazil) Juan Douglas | (Costa Rica) Paulo Santamaría | (Ghana) Samuel Ofori | (Ivory Coast) Yaya Sogodogo | (Montenegro) Vasko Kalezić | (Niger) Najeeb Yakubu | (Spain) Pirulo | (Spain) Sergio Chica | (Spain) Tiri | (Tajikistan) Rakhmatsho Rakhmatzoda | | (Guinea) Oumar Bah (Spain) Marcos Blasco |
| Persik | (Australia) Reno Piscopo | (Guinea-Bissau) Marcelo Djaló | (Portugal) Eduardo Barbosa | (Portugal) Kiko | (Spain) Ernesto Gómez | (Spain) Imanol García | (Spain) Jon Toral | (Spain) José Enrique | (Spain) Sergio Castel | (South Korea) Park Jun-heong | | | |
| Persita | (Brazil) Éber Bessa | (Brazil) Luquinhas | (Equatorial Guinea) Pablo Ganet | (Kyrgyzstan) Tamirlan Kozubayev | (Madagascar) Alexandre Ramalingom | (Portugal) Igor Rodrigues | (Serbia) Aleksa Andrejić | (Spain) Rayco Rodríguez | (Spain) Tyronne del Pino | (Uzbekistan) Javlon Guseynov | | | |
| PSIM | (Argentina) Ezequiel Vidal | (Argentina) Franco Ramos Mingo | (Costa Rica) Marvin Loría | (Czech Republic) Ondřej Rudzan | (Japan) Yusaku Yamadera | (Netherlands) Jop van der Avert | (Paraguay) Mauro Caballero | (Poland) Adrian Purzycki | (Portugal) Zé Valente | (Spain) Adrián Dalmau | (Slovenia) Nermin Haljeta | | |
| PSM^{4} | (Brazil) Aloísio Neto | (Brazil) Victor Luiz | (Japan) Kodai Tanaka | (Malaysia) Ezequiel Agüero | (Montenegro) Dušan Lagator | (North Macedonia) Stefan Jevtoski | (Netherlands) Navarone Foor | (Serbia) Luka Bulatović | (Serbia) Luka Čumić | (Serbia) Nenad Lalić | (South Africa) Lars Veldwijk | | |
| PSS | (Brazil) Cleberson | (Brazil) Gustavo Tocantins | (Brazil) Lucão | (Brazil) Matheus Fornazari | (Brazil) Pedro Caracoci | (Burundi) Christophe Nduwarugira | (France) Frédéric Injaï | (Japan) Hiromu Tanaka | (Mali) Moussa Bagayoko | (North Macedonia) Stefan Ashkovski | (Uganda) Melvyn Lorenzen | | |

Notes:

1. Players who were either still under contract but de-registered due to various reasons (such as injury), or registered exclusively for continental competitions (ACL2, ACGL, and ACC).
2. Isenmulang Kalteng was initially banned from making transfers for 3 registration periods by FIFA, but their name was now removed from the FIFA Registration Bans website.
3. Persib was initially banned from making transfers for 3 registration periods by FIFA, but their name was now removed from the FIFA Registration Bans website.
4. PSM was initially banned from making transfers for 3 registration periods on two occasions by FIFA due to players' unpaid salaries, but their name was now removed from the FIFA Registration Bans website.

== Standings ==
| Pos | Team | Pld | W | D | L | GF | GA | GD | Pts | Qualification or relegation |
|---|---|---|---|---|---|---|---|---|---|---|
| 1 | Persija | 10 | 7 | 1 | 2 | 20 | 9 | +11 | 22 | Qualification for the 2027–28 AFC Champions League Two group stage |
| 2 | Dewa United Banten | 10 | 6 | 2 | 2 | 16 | 13 | +3 | 20 | Qualification for the 2027–28 AFC Champions League Two play-offs |
| 3 | Bali United | 10 | 6 | 1 | 3 | 27 | 11 | +16 | 19 | |
| 4 | Persib | 10 | 6 | 1 | 3 | 18 | 11 | +7 | 19 | |
| 5 | Madura United | 10 | 6 | 1 | 3 | 16 | 11 | +5 | 19 | |
| 6 | Persita | 9 | 5 | 3 | 1 | 18 | 11 | +7 | 18 | |
| 7 | Bhayangkara Presisi | 10 | 3 | 6 | 1 | 13 | 11 | +2 | 15 | |
| 8 | Java United (Note: Java United had 2 points deduction due to home base relocation.) | 10 | 4 | 4 | 2 | 15 | 12 | +3 | 14 | |
| 9 | Persebaya | 10 | 3 | 5 | 2 | 11 | 9 | +2 | 14 | |
| 10 | Garudayaksa | 10 | 4 | 2 | 4 | 13 | 16 | −3 | 14 | |
| 11 | Arema | 10 | 3 | 3 | 4 | 20 | 20 | 0 | 12 | |
| 12 | Borneo Samarinda | 9 | 3 | 2 | 4 | 8 | 10 | −2 | 11 | |
| 13 | PSM | 10 | 2 | 5 | 3 | 11 | 15 | −4 | 11 | |
| 14 | Persik | 10 | 3 | 2 | 5 | 11 | 16 | −5 | 11 | |
| 15 | Isenmulang Kalteng (Note: Isenmulang Kalteng had 2 points deduction due to home base relocation.) | 10 | 2 | 3 | 5 | 4 | 16 | −12 | 7 | |
| 16 | PSIM | 10 | 1 | 3 | 6 | 8 | 16 | −8 | 6 | Relegation to the 2027–28 Championship |
| 17 | PSS | 10 | 1 | 2 | 7 | 12 | 20 | −8 | 5 | Relegation to the 2027–28 Championship |
| 18 | Persijap | 10 | 0 | 2 | 8 | 5 | 19 | −14 | 2 | Relegation to the 2027–28 Championship |

Updated to match(es) played on 22 November 2026. Source: Super League 2026–27
Rules for classification: 1) Points; 2) Head-to-head points; 3) Head-to-head goal difference; 4) Head-to-head goals scored; 5) Goal difference; 6) Goals scored; 7) Fair-play points; 8) Draw.

=== Position by round ===
| Team ╲ Round | 1 | 2 | 3 | 4 | 5 | 6 | 7 | 8 | 9 | 10 | 11 | 12 | 13 | 14 | 15 | 16 | 17 | 18 | 19 | 20 | 21 | 22 | 23 | 24 | 25 | 26 | 27 | 28 | 29 | 30 | 31 | 32 | 33 | 34 |
|---|---|---|---|---|---|---|---|---|---|---|---|---|---|---|---|---|---|---|---|---|---|---|---|---|---|---|---|---|---|---|---|---|---|---|
| Arema | 1 | 4 | 7 | 9 | 10 | 12 | 10 | 11 | 14 | | | | | | | | | | | | | | | | | | | | | | | | | |
| Bali United | 4 | 1 | 4 | 3 | 6 | 4 | 3 | 3 | 3 | | | | | | | | | | | | | | | | | | | | | | | | | |
| Bhayangkara Presisi | 8 | 11 | 8 | 10 | 8 | 6 | 8 | 8 | 9 | | | | | | | | | | | | | | | | | | | | | | | | | |
| Borneo Samarinda | 13 | 10 | 6 | 11 | 11 | 13 | 11 | 12 | 11 | | | | | | | | | | | | | | | | | | | | | | | | | |
| Dewa United Banten | 5 | 6 | 1 | 2 | 2 | 2 | 2 | 2 | 2 | | | | | | | | | | | | | | | | | | | | | | | | | |
| Garudayaksa | 7 | 14 | 13 | 14 | 13 | 14 | 14 | 14 | 10 | | | | | | | | | | | | | | | | | | | | | | | | | |
| Isenmulang Kalteng | 18 | 18 | 18 | 18 | 17 | 16 | 16 | 17 | 15 | | | | | | | | | | | | | | | | | | | | | | | | | |
| Java United | 17 | 17 | 17 | 13 | 12 | 11 | 13 | 9 | 7 | | | | | | | | | | | | | | | | | | | | | | | | | |
| Madura United | 3 | 2 | 2 | 4 | 4 | 3 | 5 | 5 | 4 | | | | | | | | | | | | | | | | | | | | | | | | | |
| Persebaya | 11 | 7 | 10 | 6 | 7 | 9 | 7 | 7 | 8 | | | | | | | | | | | | | | | | | | | | | | | | | |
| Persib | 2 | 8 | 5 | 8 | 5 | 8 | 4 | 4 | 5 | | | | | | | | | | | | | | | | | | | | | | | | | |
| Persija | 6 | 3 | 3 | 1 | 1 | 1 | 1 | 1 | 1 | | | | | | | | | | | | | | | | | | | | | | | | | |
| Persijap | 16 | 16 | 16 | 17 | 18 | 18 | 18 | 18 | 18 | | | | | | | | | | | | | | | | | | | | | | | | | |
| Persik | 14 | 9 | 11 | 7 | 9 | 7 | 9 | 10 | 13 | | | | | | | | | | | | | | | | | | | | | | | | | |
| Persita | 10 | 5 | 9 | 5 | 3 | 5 | 6 | 6 | 6 | | | | | | | | | | | | | | | | | | | | | | | | | |
| PSIM | 9 | 12 | 14 | 16 | 16 | 17 | 17 | 15 | 17 | | | | | | | | | | | | | | | | | | | | | | | | | |
| PSM | 15 | 13 | 12 | 15 | 14 | 10 | 12 | 13 | 12 | | | | | | | | | | | | | | | | | | | | | | | | | |
| PSS | 12 | 15 | 15 | 12 | 15 | 15 | 15 | 16 | 16 | | | | | | | | | | | | | | | | | | | | | | | | | |

| Qualification for AFC Champions League Two group stage |
| Qualification for AFC Champions League Two play-offs |
| Relegation to Championship |

Updated to match(es) played on 8 November 2026. Source: Super League 2026–27

== Results ==
| Home \ Away | AFC | BLI | BFC | BOR | DUB | GFC | KFC | JVU | MDR | PBY | SIB | PSJ | JAP | KDR | PTR | JOG | PSM | PSS |
|---|---|---|---|---|---|---|---|---|---|---|---|---|---|---|---|---|---|---|
| Arema | | 1–3 | 2–2 | | 4–0 | | 4–0 | | | a | a | | | 1–1 | | | | |
| Bali United | | | | | | 5–0 | 4–1 | | | | | | 6–1 | 3–0 | | | | 2–1 |
| Bhayangkara Presisi | | | | | | | 2–0 | | | 1–1 | | | 1–0 | | | 1–0 | 0–0 | |
| Borneo Samarinda | | 1–0 | | | 1–3 | | | | | | | 0–1 | | | | | 1–1 | |
| Dewa United Banten | | | 2–2 | | | | | | | | | 2–1 | 2–0 | | 0–1 | | | 2–1 |
| Garudayaksa | 3–1 | | | | | | | | 1–0 | | 1–2 | | | 0–2 | | | | 3–1 |
| Isenmulang Kalteng | | | | 0–0 | | | | 1–1 | | 0–1 | | | | | | 0–0 | | |
| Java United | | 3–2 | 2–0 | 2–1 | | 1–1 | | | | | 2–1 | | | | | | | |
| Madura United | 3–0 | | 3–3 | | | | | | | a | 1–0 | | 2–0 | | | 2–1 | | |
| Persebaya | a | | | | | 1–1 | | 1–1 | 3–1 | | | | 1–1 | | | 1–0 | | 2–2 |
| Persib | a | 2–1 | | | 2–2 | | 4–0 | | | | | a | | 1–0 | | | 3–1 | |
| Persija | 5–1 | | | | | | | 1–0 | | 1–0 | 2–1 | | | 2–1 | a | | | |
| Persijap | | | | 0–1 | | 1–2 | 0–1 | 1–1 | | | 1–2 | | | | | | | |
| Persik | | | | | 0–1 | | | | 2–0 | | | | | | 1–5 | 2–2 | | 2–1 |
| Persita | | 1–1 | | | | 2–1 | 0–1 | 3–2 | | | | 3–2 | | | | | | |
| PSIM | | | | 2–1 | 1–2 | | | | | | | 0–4 | | | 1–1 | | 1–2 | |
| PSM | 3–3 | | | | | | | | 0–1 | 1–0 | | | | | 2–2 | | | |
| PSS | 0–3 | | 1–1 | 1–2 | | | | | 1–3 | | | | | | | | 3–0 | |

Updated to match(es) played on 22 November 2026. Source: Super League 2026–27
Legend: Blue = home team win; Yellow = draw; Red = away team win.
For upcoming matches, an "a" indicates there is an article about the rivalry between the two participants.

== Attendances ==
=== Overall ===
| Pos | Team | Total | High | Low | Average | Change |
|---|---|---|---|---|---|---|
| 1 | Persija | 58,961 | 58,961 | 58,961 | 58,961 | +175.4% |
| 2 | Persib | 24,923 | 24,923 | 24,923 | 24,923 | +4.7% |
| 3 | Bali United | 23,991 | 16,000 | 7,991 | 11,996 | +60.4% |
| 4 | Persebaya | 15,116 | 15,116 | 15,116 | 15,116 | −9.8% |
| 5 | PSS | 14,322 | 14,322 | 14,322 | 14,322 | n/a^{†} |
| 6 | PSIM | 8,790 | 8,790 | 8,790 | 8,790 | +38.6% |
| 7 | Borneo Samarinda | 6,161 | 6,161 | 6,161 | 6,161 | −10.2% |
| 8 | Persik | 5,662 | 5,662 | 5,662 | 5,662 | +98.5% |
| 9 | Java United | 4,987 | 4,987 | 4,987 | 4,987 | +86.9% |
| 10 | Persijap | 3,820 | 3,820 | 3,820 | 3,820 | +7.4% |
| 11 | Madura United | 3,447 | 3,447 | 3,447 | 3,447 | +62.5% |
| 12 | Bhayangkara Presisi | 3,058 | 3,058 | 3,058 | 3,058 | +4.1% |
| 13 | Arema | 1,767 | 1,767 | 1,767 | 1,767 | −29.7% |
| 14 | Persita | 1,258 | 1,258 | 1,258 | 1,258 | −61.5% |
| 15 | Dewa United Banten | 987 | 987 | 987 | 987 | +3.7% |
| 16 | Garudayaksa | 474 | 474 | 474 | 474 | n/a^{†} |
| 17 | Isenmulang Kalteng | 0 | 0 | 0 | 0 | n/a^{†} |
| 18 | PSM | 0 | 0 | 0 | 0 | −100.0% |
| | League total | 0 | 0 | 0 | 0 | n/a |

Updated to games played on 13 September 2026
Source: Super League 2026–27
Notes:
^{†} Teams played previous season in Championship

=== Home matches played ===
As of 1 November 2026

| Club \ Matches played | 1 | 2 | 3 | 4 | 5 | 6 | 7 | 8 | 9 | 10 | 11 | 12 | 13 | 14 | 15 | 16 | 17 | Total |
|---|---|---|---|---|---|---|---|---|---|---|---|---|---|---|---|---|---|---|
| Arema | 1,767 | 4,084 | 1,528 | 1,106 | 2,652 | | | | | | | | | | | | | 11,137 |
| Bali United | 16,000 | 7,991 | 6,448 | 2574 | | | | | | | | | | | | | | 33,013 |
| Bhayangkara Presisi | 3,058 | 3,591 | 4,041 | 2,839 | | | | | | | | | | | | | | 13,529 |
| Borneo Samarinda | 6,161 | 1,056 | 900 | | | | | | | | | | | | | | | 8,117 |
| Dewa United Banten | 987 | 1,494 | 774 | 993 | | | | | | | | | | | | | | 4,248 |
| Garudayaksa† | 474 | 1,882 | 16,512 | 446 | | | | | | | | | | | | | | 19,314 |
| Isenmulang Kalteng† | 0 | 0 | 0 | | | | | | | | | | | | | | | 0 |
| Java United | 4,987 | 3,050 | 3,712 | 895 | | | | | | | | | | | | | | 12,644 |
| Madura United | 3,447 | 4,317 | 2,164 | 5,370 | | | | | | | | | | | | | | 15,298 |
| Persebaya | 15,116 | 11,728 | 35,108 | 10,364 | 9,188 | | | | | | | | | | | | | 81,504 |
| Persib | 24,923 | 20,146 | 19,739 | 16,443 | | | | | | | | | | | | | | 81,251 |
| Persija | 58,961 | 0 | 22,269 | 15,872 | | | | | | | | | | | | | | 97,102 |
| Persijap | 3,820 | 8,500 | 804 | | | | | | | | | | | | | | | 13,124 |
| Persik | 5,662 | 2,307 | 5,995 | 2,878 | | | | | | | | | | | | | | 16,842 |
| Persita | 1,258 | 588 | 5,225 | 1,213 | | | | | | | | | | | | | | 8,284 |
| PSIM | 8,790 | 8,992 | 0 | 2,533 | | | | | | | | | | | | | | 20,315 |
| PSM | 0 | 0 | 2,807 | 1,775 | | | | | | | | | | | | | | 4,582 |
| PSS† | 14,322 | 14,054 | 10,339 | | | | | | | | | | | | | | | 38,715 |
| League total | | | | | | | | | | | | | | | | | | 480,586 |

Source: Super League 2026–27

Notes:
^{†} Teams played previous season in Championship
Matches played behind closed doors.

== Season statistics ==
=== Top scorers ===
As of 23 November 2026

| Rank | Player | Club | Goals |
|---|---|---|---|
| 1 | (Sweden) Alexander Jeremejeff | Persija Jakarta | 7 |
| 2 | (Brazil) Careca | Arema | 6 |
| 2 | (Japan) Teppei Yachida | Bali United | 6 |
| 2 | (Brazil) Denílson | Dewa United | 6 |
| 2 | (Bulgaria) Dimitar Mitkov | Madura United | 6 |
| 6 | (Indonesia) Irfan Jaya | Bali United | 5 |
| 6 | (Haiti) Jayro Jean | Garudayaksa | 5 |
| 8 | (Brazil) Queven | Bali United | 4 |
| 8 | (Mexico) Brian Rubio | Garudayaksa | 4 |
| 8 | (Portugal) Miguel Pereira | Persebaya Surabaya | 4 |
| 8 | (Montenegro) Balša Sekulić | Persib Bandung | 4 |
| 8 | (Equatorial Guinea) Pablo Ganet | Persita Tangerang | 4 |
| 8 | (Madagascar) Alexandre Ramalingom | Persita Tangerang | 4 |
| 8 | (Serbia) Aleksa Andrejić | Persita Tangerang | 4 |
| 15 | Eighteen players | | 3 |

=== Hat-tricks ===
| Player | For | Against | Result | Date |
|---|---|---|---|---|
| (Bonaire) Jort van der Sande | Bali United | Persijap | 6–1 (H) | 10 October 2026 |
| (Equatorial Guinea) Pablo Ganet | Persita | Persik | 5–1 (A) | 31 October 2026 |

== Awards ==
=== Monthly awards ===
| Month | Player of the Month | | Young Player of the Month | | Coach of the Month | | Goal of the Month | | Assist of the Month | | Save of the Month | |
| Month | Player | Team | Player | Team | Coach | Team | Player | Team | Player | Team | Player | Team |
|---|---|---|---|---|---|---|---|---|---|---|---|---|
| September | (Bulgaria) Dimitar Mitkov | Madura United | (Indonesia) Zanadin Fariz | Persik | (South Korea) Shin Tae-yong | Persija | (Bulgaria) Dimitar Mitkov | Madura United | (Brazil) Jajá | Madura United | (Indonesia) Nadeo Argawinata | Persija |
| September | References: | | | | | | | | | | | |
| October | | | | | | | | | | | | |
| October | References: | | | | | | | | | | | |

== See also ==
- 2026–27 Championship
- 2026–27 Liga Nusantara
- 2026–27 Liga 4
- 2026–27 I-League Cup
- 2026–27 Indonesia Women's League
