= Luka Bulatović =

Serbian footballer (born 1998)

Personal information
- Full name: Luka Bulatović
- Date of birth: 16 December 1998 (age 27)
- Place of birth: Belgrade, FR Yugoslavia
- Height: 1.79 m (5 ft 10 in)
- Position: Winger • right winger

Team information
- Current team: PSM Makassar
- Number: 11

Senior career*
Years	Team	Apps	(Gls)
2019–2020	Titograd		
2020	Dinamo Pančevo	3	(0)
2020–2021	Radnički Sremska Mitrovica	6	(0)
2021–2022	Amvrakikos Loutrou	0	(0)
2022	Lefkimmi	8	(0)
2022–2024	Makedonikos	24	(2)
2024–2025	Gorica	29	(7)
2025–2026	Pelister	33	(10)
2026–	PSM Makassar	3	(0)
- * Club domestic league appearances and goals as of 6 September 2026

Luka Bulatović (Serbian Cyrillic: Лука Булатовић; born 16 December 1998) is a Serbian professional footballer who plays as a winger or right midfielder for Super League club PSM Makassar. He can operate effectively on both flanks, though he predominantly features as a right winger.

== Club career ==
Bulatović spent the earlier parts of his senior career playing across several European clubs, including stints at Titograd in Montenegro. Then, he returned to Serbia and joined Dinamo Pančevo in the 2020 season and Radnički Sremska Mitrovica in 2020–21 season.

In January 2022, he moved abroad and joined Lefkimmi in Greece, previously he plays for Amvrakikos Loutrou. Then, he joined another Greece club, Makedonikos Neapolis in August 2022.

Bulatović subsequently represented Slovenian club Gorica, before signing with Macedonian First Football League club Pelister for 2025–26 season. During his single-season campaign with Pelister, he enjoyed a highly productive spell, establishing himself as a key attacker by netting 10 goals and providing 4 assists in league competition.

=== PSM Makassar ===
On 12 August 2026, Bulatović officially moved to Southeast Asia and signed a contract with Indonesian top-tier club PSM Makassar. He was introduced alongside fellow foreign signings Nenad Lalić and Stefan Jevtoski to reinforce the squad's offensive options for the 2026–27 Super League campaign. He made his league debut for PSM Makassar on 6 September 2026, coming on as a starter in a 3–1 lose over Persib Bandung.
