= Buyung =

Buyung is a given name.

== Real people ==
- Adnan Buyung Nasution (1934 – 2015), an Indonesian lawyer, advocate, and activist
- Buyung Ismu Lessy (born 1999), an Indonesian professional footballer
- Sultan Buyung (died 1589), the ninth sultan of Aceh

== Fictional characters ==
- Buyung, a character in Indonesian novel Harimau! Harimau!.
