= Buyung Ismu Lessy =

Indonesian footballer

Buyung Ismu
Personal information
- Full name: Muhamad Buyung Ismu Lessy
- Date of birth: 8 May 1999 (age 27)
- Place of birth: Ambon, Indonesia
- Height: 1.72 m (5 ft 8 in)
- Positions: Left-back; midfielder

Team information
- Current team: Persijap Jepara
- Number: 22

Youth career
- 2017–2018: Persis Solo

Senior career*
| Years | Team | Apps | (Gls) |
| 2019 | PS Hatusela Mamala | | |
| 2019–2020 | Persiter Ternate | | |
| 2021–2025 | Barito Putera | 89 | (4) |
| 2026– | Persijap Jepara | 23 | (0) |
- * Club domestic league appearances and goals as of 7 November 2026

Muhamad Buyung Ismu Lessy (born 8 May 1999) is an Indonesian professional footballer who plays as a left-back or midfielder for Super League club Persijap Jepara.

== Club career ==
=== Barito Putera ===
On 30 August 2021, Lessy joined PS Barito Putera on a three-years contract. Lessy made his league debut on 27 September 2021 in a match against PSM Makassar at the Wibawa Mukti Stadium, Cikarang. Coming on as a substitutesd in the second half, Lessy provided an assist for Rafinha in a 4–1 win over Persiraja Banda Aceh on 19 November.

In a match against PSIS Semarang on 10 February 2022, he played the full 90 minutes for the first time in a 1–2 win in gameweek 24. Four days later, Lessy give another assists for Beni Oktovianto in a 3–0 win against three time Liga 1 champions Persipura Jayapura. On 19 March, Lessy scored his first league goal for Laskar Antasari in a 0–2 win against Persik Kediri. He finished his first season with Barito in 2021–22 season with 1 goal in 22 games.

On 30 July 2022, he started his match in the 2022–23 Liga 1 season for Barito in a Kalimantan Derby, playing as a substitutes in a 3–1 win over Borneo Samarinda. Lessy scored his first goal of the 2022–23 season on 16 September in a 5–2 lose against Persib Bandung. He added his second goals of the season on 6 December with one goal against Persebaya Surabaya in a 3–2 away lose.

He added his third goals of the season on 5 April 2023 with one goal against Bhayangkara, scored equalizer in a 1–1 draw at Wibawa Mukti Stadium.

In May 2023, Lessy extended his contract with the club for three season, he has played 42 appearances in the last two seasons. He has scored four goals and provided two assists.

In December 2025, Barito Putera officially announced Lessy's release. He has not played since the start of the 2025–26 season because he was not included in Stefano Cugurra's team plans.

=== Persijap Jepara ===
On 11 January 2026, Persijap announced the signing of Lessy.

== Career statistics ==
=== Club ===
As of 7 November 2026.

| Club | Season | League | | | Cup | | Continental | | Other | | Total | |
| Club | Season | Division | Apps | Goals | Apps | Goals | Apps | Goals | Apps | Goals | Apps | Goals |
|---|---|---|---|---|---|---|---|---|---|---|---|---|
| Barito Putera | 2021–22 | Liga 1 | 22 | 1 | 0 | 0 | – | | 0 | 0 | 22 | 1 |
| Barito Putera | 2022–23 | Liga 1 | 20 | 3 | 0 | 0 | – | | 5 (Note: Appearances in Indonesia President's Cup) | 0 | 25 | 3 |
| Barito Putera | 2023–24 | Liga 1 | 30 | 0 | 0 | 0 | – | | 0 | 0 | 30 | 0 |
| Barito Putera | 2024–25 | Liga 1 | 17 | 0 | 0 | 0 | – | | 0 | 0 | 17 | 0 |
| Barito Putera | 2025–26 | Championship | 0 | 0 | 0 | 0 | – | | 0 | 0 | 0 | 0 |
| Persijap Jepara | 2025–26 | Super League | 14 | 0 | 0 | 0 | – | | 0 | 0 | 14 | 0 |
| Persijap Jepara | 2026–27 | Super League | 9 | 0 | 0 | 0 | – | | 0 | 0 | 9 | 0 |
| Career total | | | 112 | 4 | 0 | 0 | 0 | 0 | 5 | 0 | 117 | 4 |
