= Oumar Bah =

Guinean footballer (born 1995)

Personal information
- Full name: Oumar Bah
- Date of birth: 5 January 1995 (age 31)
- Place of birth: Conakry, Guinea
- Height: 1.90 m (6 ft 3 in)
- Position: Centre-back

Senior career*
Years	Team	Apps	(Gls)
2018–2019	CE Europa	27	(3)
2019–2021	Sant Andreu	33	(1)
2021	Hapoel Nof HaGalil	4	(0)
2021–2023	Granollers	24	(5)
2023	L'Hospitalet	3	(0)
2024	Grama	16	(0)
2024–2025	Vilassar de Mar	16	(0)
2026	Kerala Blasters	3	(0)
2026	Persijap Jepara	0	(0)
- * Club domestic league appearances and goals as of 28 February 2026

Oumar Bah (born 5 January 1995) is a Guinean professional footballer who plays as a centre-back.

== Club career ==
=== Early career and Europe ===
Bah spent the early phases of his senior career operating in the lower divisions of Spanish football, including developmental spells with clubs such as CE Europa and Sant Andreu. For the 2021 season, he moved to Israel to sign with Liga Leumit side Hapoel Nof HaGalil. He registered 4 league appearances in the Israeli second tier, logging 113 total minutes on the pitch before his departure. In October 2021, Granollers announced an agreement to sign Bah. On 22 November 2021, Bah scored a hat-trick in a 4–3 victory against Castelldefels.

In 2023, L'Hospitalet confirmed the signing of a new player for its first team, Bah, he previously played for Granollers. After a brief stint with the club, Bah officially left in December 2023, having made only three appearances; the following year, he joined Grama.

=== Kerala Blasters ===
On 31 January 2026, Bah signed a short-term professional contract with Indian Super League club Kerala Blasters to reinforce their defensive depth for the remainder of the season.

During the 2025–26 Indian Super League campaign, he made three starting appearances, recording a full 90-minute display against Mumbai City and featuring in a fixture against Inter Kashi.

=== Persijap Jepara ===
Following his stint in India, Bah completed a transfer to Southeast Asia. On 15 August 2026, he was officially announced as a new signing for Indonesian Super League side Persijap Jepara under manager Juan Cortes. He joined the team alongside fellow newly recruited defenders to anchor the backline for the upcoming 2026–27 Super League season.
