= Muhammad Arfan =

Indonesian footballer

Personal information
- Full name: Muhammad Arfan
- Date of birth: 22 January 1998 (age 28)
- Place of birth: Makassar, Indonesia
- Height: 1.70 m (5 ft 7 in)
- Position: Midfielder

Team information
- Current team: PSM Makassar
- Number: 48

Youth career
- 2010–2015: SSB Hasanudin
- 2016: PSM Makassar

Senior career*
Years	Team	Apps	(Gls)
2017–	PSM Makassar	168	(3)

International career
2017	Indonesia U23	1	(0)
2017	Indonesia	1	(0)
- * Club domestic league appearances and goals as of 2 February 2026

Muhammad Arfan (born 22 January 1998) is an Indonesian professional footballer who plays as a midfielder for Super League club PSM Makassar.

== Club career ==
=== Early career ===
In 2010, Arfan started his football career when joined SSB Hasanudin in the 2010 Danone Nations Cup. At that time, Arfan and his teammates succeeded in bringing the champions in the regional level, which later became the representative of South Sulawesi in the national level, and ini Jakarta, they only ranked third.

=== PSM Makassar ===
He played in 2016 Indonesia Soccer Championship U-21 and then joined the senior team of PSM Makassar. Arfan made his professional debut on 16 April 2017 in a match against Persela Lamongan. On 1 November 2021, Arfan scored his first goal for PSM in the 28th minute against Persita Tangerang at the Manahan Stadium, Surakarta.

== International career ==
He made his international debut for the U-23 team on 16 November 2017, against Syria U23, where he came on as a substitute. Arfan made his debut for Indonesia in an unofficial friendly match in a loss to the Syria U23 team on 18 November 2017. A week later he made his official debut on 25 November in a match against Guyana, where he came as a substitute.

== Career statistics ==
=== Club ===
As of match played 2 February 2026

Club	Season	League			Cup (Note: Includes Piala Indonesia)		Continental (Note: Appearances in AFC Cup)		Other		Total	
Club	Season	Division	Apps	Goals	Apps	Goals	Apps	Goals	Apps	Goals	Apps	Goals
PSM Makassar	2017	Liga 1	28	0	0	0	0	0	0	0	28	0
PSM Makassar	2018	Liga 1	11	0	0	0	0	0	0	0	11	0
PSM Makassar	2019	Liga 1	20	0	3	0	5	0	0	0	28	0
PSM Makassar	2020	Liga 1	2	0	0	0	3	0	0	0	5	0
PSM Makassar	2021–22	Liga 1	31	2	0	0	0	0	0	0	31	2
PSM Makassar	2022–23	Liga 1	33	0	0	0	4	0	4 (Note: Appearances in Indonesia President's Cup)	0	41	0
PSM Makassar	2023–24	Liga 1	31	0	0	0	4	0	0	0	35	0
PSM Makassar	2024–25	Liga 1	0	0	0	0	–		0	0	0	0
PSM Makassar	2025–26	Super League	9	0	0	0	–		0	0	9	0
Career total			165	2	3	0	16	0	4	0	188	2

=== International ===
As of match played 25 November 2017

Appearances and goals by national team and year
National team	Year	Apps	Goals
Indonesia	2017	1	0
Total		1	0

== Honours ==
=== Club ===
PSM Makassar

- Liga 1: 2022–23
- Piala Indonesia: 2018–19

=== International ===
Indonesia

- Aceh World Solidarity Cup runner-up: 2017
