= Victor Luiz (footballer, born December 1997) =

Brazilian footballer (born 1997)

Personal information
- Full name: Victor Luiz Prestes Filho
- Date of birth: 5 December 1997 (age 28)
- Place of birth: Belo Horizonte, Brazil
- Height: 1.77 m (5 ft 10 in)
- Position: Left-back

Team information
- Current team: PSM Makassar
- Number: 22

Youth career
- –2017: Cruzeiro

Senior career*
Years	Team	Apps	(Gls)
2017–2020	Cruzeiro	0	(0)
2017	→ Democrata (loan)	3	(0)
2018	→ Londrina (loan)	4	(0)
2019	→ HJK (loan)	4	(0)
2020	→ Villa Nova (loan)	5	(0)
2020–2022	St. Lucia	44	(0)
2022–2023	Alverca	25	(0)
2023–2024	Valletta	24	(1)
2024–	PSM Makassar	65	(1)
- * Club domestic league appearances and goals as of 6 September 2026

Victor Luiz Prestes Filho (born 5 December 1997) is a Brazilian professional footballer who plays as a left-back for Super League club PSM Makassar.

== Career statistics ==
=== Club ===
As of 6 September 2026.

Club	Season	League			State League		Cup		Continental		Other		Total	
Club	Season	Division	Apps	Goals	Apps	Goals	Apps	Goals	Apps	Goals	Apps	Goals	Apps	Goals
Cruzeiro	2017	Série A	0	0	0	0	0	0	0	0	0	0	0	0
Cruzeiro	2018	Série A	0	0	0	0	0	0	0	0	0	0	0	0
Cruzeiro	2019	Série A	0	0	0	0	0	0	0	0	0	0	0	0
Cruzeiro	Total		0	0	0	0	0	0	0	0	0	0	0	0
Democrata (loan)	2017	–			3 (Note: Appearances in the Campeonato Mineiro)	0	0	0	–		0	0	3	0
Londrina (loan)	2018	Série B	4	0	0	0	0	0	–		0	0	4	0
HJK (loan)	2019	Veikkausliiga	4	0	–		0	0	1 (Note: Appearances in the UEFA Champions League)	0	0	0	5	0
Villa Nova (loan)	2020	Série D	0	0	5	0	0	0	–		0	0	5	0
St. Lucia	2020–21	Maltese Premier League	19	0	–		2	0	0	0	0	0	21	0
St. Lucia	2021–22	Maltese Premier League	25	0	–		4	0	0	0	0	0	29	0
St. Lucia	Total		44	0	0	0	6	0	0	0	0	0	50	0
Alverca	2022–23	Liga 3	25	0	–		0	0	0	0	0	0	25	0
Valletta	2023–24	Maltese Premier League	24	1	–		2	0	0	0	0	0	26	1
PSM Makassar	2024–25	Liga 1	32	0	–		0	0	0	0	6 (Note: Appearances in ASEAN Club Championship)	0	38	0
PSM Makassar	2025–26	Super League	29	1	–		0	0	0	0	0	0	29	1
PSM Makassar	2026–27	Super League	1	0	–		0	0	0	0	0	0	1	0
Career total			163	2	8	0	8	0	1	0	6	0	186	2

== Honours ==
Individual

- Liga 1 Team of the Season: 2024–25
- Super League Player of the Month: August 2025
