= China (footballer, born 1998) =

Brazilian footballer (born 1998)

Personal information
- Full name: Weyderson Denilson dos Santos Xavier
- Date of birth: 9 July 1998 (age 28)
- Place of birth: Além Paraíba, Minas Gerais, Brazil
- Height: 1.77 m (5 ft 10 in)
- Position: Right winger

Team information
- Current team: Persijap Jepara
- Number: 25

Senior career*
Years	Team	Apps	(Gls)
–2021	Luziânia-DF	7	(0)
2022	Fast Clube	9	(1)
2022	Cariri-CE	5	(0)
2022	ASEEV	13	(4)
2022–2023	Manauara	7	(0)
2023	Glória-RS	9	(1)
2023	Comercial-SP	6	(0)
2024	Manauara	9	(2)
2024	Veranópolis	9	(0)
2024	Costa Rica	2	(0)
2025	Parintins	3	(0)
2025	Passo Fundo	6	(0)
2025–2026	Nagaworld	29	(7)
2026–	Persijap Jepara	7	(1)
- * Club domestic league appearances and goals as of 7 November 2026

Weyderson Denilson dos Santos Xavier (born 9 July 1998), commonly known as China, is a Brazilian professional footballer who plays as a right winger for Super League club Persijap Jepara.

== Club career ==
Born in Além Paraíba, Minas Gerais, Brazil, he joined several local Brazilian clubs. He decided to go abroad for the first time to Cambodia and joined Cambodian Premier League club Nagaworld for the 2025–26 season.

He made his debut for Nagaworld on 10 August 2025, coming on as a starter in a 3–0 away lose against Svay Rieng. A week later, he scored his first league goal for Nagaworld against National Defense Ministry, scored the opening in a 1–1 draw. On 27 September 2025, China scored a brace in Nagaworld's 3–1 home win against Kirivong. He added his fourth goals of the season on 15 March 2026 with one goal against MOI Kompong Dewa in a 0–2 away win. And scored the winning goal in a 1–0 home win against Phnom Penh Crown a week later.

During his spell with the Phnom Penh-based club, China scored 7 goals and provided 3 assists, finishing as one of the top scorers for his team and ranking 12th overall in the league's top scorers list.

=== Persijap Jepara ===
On 4 September 2026, Indonesian club Persijap Jepara officially announced the signing of China to bolster their attacking line for the 2026–27 season following the club's recent promotion. He was brought in to fill the club's foreign player quota alongside other newly recruited international players. He made his league debut for Persijap on 12 September 2026, coming on as a starter in a 0–1 lose against Borneo Samarinda at the Gelora Bumi Kartini Stadium. On 7 November 2026, he scored his first league goal for Persijap in the 85th minute of a 1–2 home lose against Garudayaksa.
