= Daan Mogot derby =

Indonesian football rivalry

Persija Jakarta–Persita Tangerang rivalry
- Other names: Daan Mogot derby Jakarta–Tangerang rivalry
- Sport: Football
- Location: Greater Jakarta, Indonesia
- Teams: Persija Jakarta; Persita Tangerang
- First meeting: Persita Tangerang 1–1 Persija Jakarta (30 November 1994)
- Latest meeting: Persita Tangerang 3–2 Persija Jakarta (17 October 2026)
- Next meeting: Persija Jakarta v. Persita Tangerang (14 May 2027)
- Broadcasters: Indosiar
- Stadiums: Jakarta International Stadium (Persija Jakarta); Indomilk Arena (Persita Tangerang)

Statistics
- Total meetings: 42
- Most wins: Persija Jakarta (19)
- All-time record: Persija Jakarta: 19; Draw: 11; Persita Tangerang: 12
- Largest victory: Persija Jakarta 5–0 Persita Tangerang (26 June 2013)
- Location in Banten, Indonesia

The Persija Jakarta–Persita Tangerang rivalry, also known as the Daan Mogot derby, is an intense regional football rivalry between Persija Jakarta and Persita Tangerang, two prominent professional clubs based in the Greater Jakarta metropolitan area of Indonesia. Persija is situated in the capital city of Jakarta, while Persita represents the neighboring regency of Tangerang in Banten province.

The geographical proximity of both regions has sparked a deep-rooted sporting animosity, frequently transferring competitive friction from the pitch into high-stakes encounters between their respective supporter groups: Persija's The Jakmania and Persita's Benteng Viola.

The rivalry was named after Daan Mogot Road, a 27.5 kilometer-long arterial road that connects both Jakarta and Tangerang.

== History ==
While Persija Jakarta historically dominated the old Perserikatan era as one of Indonesia's foundational football giants, the competitive landscape against Persita Tangerang intensified during the late 1990s and early 2000s following the unification of national leagues. According to historical records archived by the RSSSF, the two sides met several times in competitive top-flight league play as early as the 1994–95 Liga Indonesia Premier Division, one of them was where Persija secured a 3–1 victory in their opening group stage encounter on 1 November 1998 in the 1998–99 Liga Indonesia Premier Division season.

The structural peak of on-pitch tensions occurred during the mid-2000s under prominent coaching figures. During a highly volatile match at the Lebak Bulus Stadium, tactical friction culminated in an infamous walkout staged by Persita Tangerang. Incensed by a controversial penalty decision awarded to Persija following a simulation in the box, Persita's veteran manager Benny Dollo ordered his entire squad to abandon the pitch in protest, a move that sparked widespread crowd disruptions and cemented the match as a historic flashpoint in the rivalry.

Persita's competitive upsurge during this era, including their run as national championship finalists, transformed the tie into a high-risk fixture requiring substantial security coordination across provincial borders. Since the 2005 season, Persija has had a long winning record over Persita.

On 17 October 2026, in the fifth week of the 2026–27 Super League, after Persita's three consecutive defeats against Persija since 2025 and the last victory was achieved in 2023, finally they managed to beat Persija with a score of 3–2 in a home match at the Banten International Stadium, Serang. The match was also marred by a riot between supporters of both clubs in the north and south stands, causing the second half kick-off to be delayed for approximately 20 minutes.

== Supporters ==
=== Persija Jakarta ===
The Jakmania is a supporter group founded in 1997, it serves as the official and highly structured supporter group of Persija Jakarta. Known for their distinct orange branding, they are among the largest fanbases in Southeast Asia.

=== Persita Tangerang ===
Benteng Viola is the primary supporter collective backing Persita Tangerang, traditionally occupying the stands at the Indomilk Arena. They have a distinctive purple color as their branding.

== Clashes and violence ==
The fierce regional proximity has historically resulted in several notable supporter clashes both inside and outside stadiums, raising security concerns for regional football match organizers.

=== 2026 Indomilk Arena clash ===
On 30 January 2026, following a modern-era Super League encounter at the Indomilk Arena which ended in a 2–0 victory for Persija, a physical conflict erupted outside the main gates of the stadium. The incident, triggered by provocative verbal exchanges and missile throwing between opposing factions, caused local traffic blockages until the South Tangerang Police Command intervened. According to reports from Antara and regional authorities under AKBP Boy Jumalolo, police personnel positioned on-site successfully de-escalated the physical altercations within minutes, detaining several instigating individuals for formal questioning at the South Tangerang Police Resort headquarters.

=== 2026 Banten International Stadium clash ===
On 17 October 2026, in the fifth week of the 2026–27 Super League match between Persita and Persija at the Banten International Stadium, a clash occurred between supporters of both teams in the north and south stands, causing a delay in the second half kick-off for around 20 minutes. This was triggered by the act of throwing flares at each other which resulted in a physical clash in the stands. Several amateur videos also show attackers carrying sticks while attacking the opposing. Some even entered the pitch. Even though it had subsided, the chaos broke out again at the end of the match which ended in Persita's 3–2 victory over Persija. To prevent further clashes outside the stadium and along the road, The Jakmania, Persija supporters, urged the police to escort them to the toll gate to Jakarta.

== Statistics ==
As of 17 October 2026

Competition	Matches	Persija wins	Draws	Persita wins	Persija goals	Persita goals
Premier Division/Indonesia Super League	30	14	7	9	43	28
Liga 1/Super League	11	5	3	3	15	8
Piala Presiden	1	0	1	0	1	1
Total	42	19	11	12	59	37

== Results ==
Persija win Draw Persita win

Date	Competition	Home team	Score	Away team	Venue
30 November 1994	1994–95 Liga Indonesia Premier Division	Persita	1–1	Persija	Benteng Stadium, Tangerang
5 July 1995	1994–95 Liga Indonesia Premier Division	Persija	1–2	Persita	Menteng Stadium, Central Jakarta
23 December 1995	1995–96 Liga Indonesia Premier Division	Persita	1–0	Persija	Benteng Stadium, Tangerang
unknown	1995–96 Liga Indonesia Premier Division	Persija	0–4	Persita	Menteng Stadium, Central Jakarta
11 December 1996	1996–97 Liga Indonesia Premier Division	Persita	2–0	Persija	Benteng Stadium, Tangerang
25 June 1997	1996–97 Liga Indonesia Premier Division	Persija	0–2	Persita	Menteng Stadium, Central Jakarta
17 December 1997	1997–98 Liga Indonesia Premier Division	Persija	2–1	Persita	Lebak Bulus Stadium, South Jakarta
—	1997–98 Liga Indonesia Premier Division	competition cancelled/not continued			
1 November 1998	1998–99 Liga Indonesia Premier Division	Persija	3–1	Persita	Lebak Bulus Stadium, South Jakarta
6 December 1998	1998–99 Liga Indonesia Premier Division	Persita	0–0	Persija	Benteng Stadium, Tangerang
7 February 2001	2001 Liga Indonesia Premier Division	Persita	1–0	Persija	Benteng Stadium, Tangerang
28 June 2001	2001 Liga Indonesia Premier Division	Persija	3–1	Persita	Lebak Bulus Stadium, South Jakarta
30 September 2001	2001 Liga Indonesia Premier Division	Persija	2–2	Persita	Lebak Bulus Stadium, South Jakarta
3 February 2002	2002 Liga Indonesia Premier Division	Persita	1–0	Persija	Benteng Stadium, Tangerang
7 April 2002	2002 Liga Indonesia Premier Division	Persija	1–1	Persita	Lebak Bulus Stadium, South Jakarta
22 January 2003	2003 Liga Indonesia Premier Division	Persita	2–0	Persija	Benteng Stadium, Tangerang
17 May 2003	2003 Liga Indonesia Premier Division	Persija	0–0	Persita	Lebak Bulus Stadium, South Jakarta
4 January 2004	2004 Liga Indonesia Premier Division	Persija	2–2	Persita	Lebak Bulus Stadium, South Jakarta
15 August 2004	2004 Liga Indonesia Premier Division	Persita	2–0	Persija	Benteng Stadium, Tangerang
24 April 2005	2005 Liga Indonesia Premier Division	Persija	2–0	Persita	Lebak Bulus Stadium, South Jakarta
19 August 2005	2005 Liga Indonesia Premier Division	Persita	0–1	Persija	Benteng Stadium, Tangerang
28 January 2006	2006 Liga Indonesia Premier Division	Persita	0–1	Persija	Benteng Stadium, Tangerang
22 April 2006	2006 Liga Indonesia Premier Division	Persija	3–0	Persita	Lebak Bulus Stadium, South Jakarta
29 April 2007	2007 Liga Indonesia Premier Division	Persija	2–1	Persita	Lebak Bulus Stadium, South Jakarta
7 August 2007	2007 Liga Indonesia Premier Division	Persita	0–3	Persija	Benteng Stadium, Tangerang
30 October 2008	2008–09 Indonesia Super League	Persija	4–0	Persita	Gelora Bung Karno Stadium, Central Jakarta
24 May 2009	2008–09 Indonesia Super League	Persita	1–1	Persija	Benteng Stadium, Tangerang
26 February 2013	2013 Indonesia Super League	Persita	0–1	Persija	Mashud Wisnusaputra Stadium, Kuningan
26 June 2013	2013 Indonesia Super League	Persija	5–0	Persita	Gelora Bung Karno Stadium, Central Jakarta
12 March 2014	2014 Liga Indonesia Premier Division	Persija	1–0	Persita	Gelora Bung Karno Stadium, Central Jakarta
12 June 2014	2014 Liga Indonesia Premier Division	Persita	0–4	Persija	Singaperbangsa Stadium, Karawang
3 September 2015	2015 Piala Presiden	Persija	1–1	Persita	I Wayan Dipta Stadium, Gianyar
28 September 2021	2021–22 Liga 1	Persija	1–1	Persita	Pakansari Stadium, Bogor
26 January 2022	2021–22 Liga 1	Persita	1–2	Persija	Ngurah Rai Stadium, Denpasar
24 August 2022	2022–23 Liga 1	Persija	1–0	Persita	Patriot Candrabhaga Stadium, Bekasi
28 March 2023	2022–23 Liga 1	Persita	1–0	Persija	Indomilk Arena, Tangerang
22 July 2023	2023–24 Liga 1	Persita	1–0	Persija	Indomilk Arena, Tangerang
3 December 2023	2023–24 Liga 1	Persija	1–1	Persita	Patriot Candrabhaga Stadium, Bekasi
18 August 2024	2024–25 Liga 1	Persita	0–0	Persija	Sultan Agung Stadium, Bantul
19 January 2025	2024–25 Liga 1	Persija	2–0	Persita	Jakarta International Stadium, North Jakarta
10 August 2025	2025–26 Super League	Persija	4–0	Persita	Jakarta International Stadium, North Jakarta
30 January 2026	2025–26 Super League	Persita	0–2	Persija	Indomilk Arena, Tangerang
17 October 2026	2026–27 Super League	Persita	3–2	Persija	Banten International Stadium, Serang
14 May 2027	2026–27 Super League	Persija		Persita	TBD

== See also ==
- List of association football club rivalries in Indonesia
- Persija Jakarta
- Persita Tangerang
