= Christian Matheus =

Brazilian footballer (born 1998)

Personal information
- Full name: Christian Matheus Lima da Silva
- Date of birth: 13 August 1998 (age 28)
- Place of birth: Belford Roxo, Brazil
- Height: 1.86 m (6 ft 1 in)
- Position: Centre back

Team information
- Current team: Borneo Samarinda
- Number: 77

Youth career
- –2019: America

Senior career*
Years	Team	Apps	(Gls)
2020–2021	Nova Cidade	9	(1)
2021–2022	Turbina	17	(0)
2023–2025	Laçi	44	(0)
2025–2026	Drenica	32	(0)
2026–	Borneo Samarinda	6	(0)
- * Club domestic league appearances and goals as of 27 October 2026

Christian Matheus Lima da Silva (born 13 August 1998), simply known as Christian, is a Brazilian professional footballer who plays as a central defender for Super League club Borneo Samarinda.

== Club career ==
Born in Belford Roxo, Rio de Janeiro, Matheus represented America as a youth, the following season, he joined Nova Cidade and played in the regional competition Campeonato Carioca Série B1.

He moved abroad for the first time in his career, after agreeing to a contract with Albanian Kategoria e Parë club Turbina, he made his league debut on 6 February 2021, as starting line-up, which ended 1–0 victory against Flamurtari. He has played 18 matches in all competitions for Turbina for 2020–21 and 2021–22 season.

In the following season, he joined Laçi of the Kategoria Superiore. Matheus made his league debut on 5 November 2023, replacing William Cordeiro in a 1–1 draw against Teuta. On 24 November 2023, he playing as a starter and played the full 90 minutes for the first time in a 0–0 draw over Vllaznia. On 17 December 2023, he picked up his first win with Laçi in his sixth appearances in a 0–1 away win over Skënderbeu. In his first season at Laçi, Matheus went on to make 20 appearances, without scoring in all competitions.

In 2025, Kosovan club, Drenica announced a deal for Matheus. He made his league debut on 17 August 2025 as a starter in a 0–0 draw over Llapi. He was a regular center back for Drenica for two seasons, He recorded 34 appearances, 1 assist, 8 yellow cards, and 3,072 minutes played across all competitions.

On 19 July 2026, Matheus officially completed a transfer to Indonesian Super League club Borneo Samarinda, marking his first venture into Asian football following his extensive career in Brazil, Albania and Kosovo.

== Career statistics ==
=== Club ===
As of 27 October 2026

Club	Season	League			Cup (Note: Includes Albanian Cup and Kosovar Cup)		Continental		Other		Total	
Club	Season	Division	Apps	Goals	Apps	Goals	Apps	Goals	Apps	Goals	Apps	Goals
Nova Cidade	2020	Campeonato Carioca Série B1	9	1	0	0	–		0	0	9	1
Turbina	2020–21	Kategoria e Parë	7	0	0	0	–		0	0	7	0
Turbina	2021–22	Kategoria e Parë	10	0	1	0	–		0	0	11	0
Laçi	2023–24	Kategoria Superiore	18	0	2	0	–		0	0	20	0
Laçi	2024–25	Kategoria Superiore	26	0	3	0	–		0	0	29	0
Drenica	2025–26	Football Superleague of Kosovo	32	0	2	0	–		0	0	34	0
Borneo Samarinda	2026–27	Super League	6	0	0	0	2 (Note: Appearances in AFC Challenge League)	0	1 (Note: Appearances in ASEAN Club Championship)	0	9	0
Career total			109	1	8	0	2	0	1	0	120	1
