= Reycredo Beremanda =

Indonesian footballer

Personal information
- Full name: Reycredo Beremanda Bukit
- Date of birth: 27 January 2004 (age 22)
- Place of birth: Batam, Indonesia
- Height: 1.70 m (5 ft 7 in)
- Position: Winger

Team information
- Current team: Persijap Jepara
- Number: 27

Youth career
- –2019: SSB Astam
- 2019–2024: Persib Bandung

Senior career*
Years	Team	Apps	(Gls)
2024–2026	Nusantara United	0	(0)
2024–2025	→ Balestier Khalsa (loan)	8	(1)
2025–2026	→ Aguilas–UMak (loan)	6	(1)
2026–	Persijap Jepara	2	(0)
- * Club domestic league appearances and goals as of 7 November 2026

Reycredo Beremanda Bukit (born 27 January 2004) is an Indonesian professional footballer who plays as a winger for Super League club Persijap Jepara.

== Club career ==
=== Loan to Balestier Khalsa ===
Reycredo was initially loaned to Nusantara United from Persib Bandung but joined the club on a permanent deal instead. On 31 May 2024, he was subsequently loaned out to Singapore Premier League club Balestier Khalsa until 30 June 2025. Reycredo joined Balestier Khalsa after successfully completing a trial alongside four other players from Nusantara United. Among the trial participants, Reycredo was the only one to pass the selection and ultimately sign with Balestier Khalsa.

He made his professional career debut with Balestier Khalsa on 19 July 2024. Reycredo was introduced in the 77th minute during a match where the Balestier, trailed 1–7 against Albirex Niigata (S), with the match ending in a 2–7 defeat.

=== Loan to Aguilas–UMak ===
On 3 July 2025, Reycredo was loaned to another partnership club of Nusantara United, which is Philippines Football League club Aguilas–UMak.
