= Nenad Lalić =

Serbian footballer (born 1999)

Personal information
- Full name: Nenad Lalić
- Date of birth: 5 April 1999 (age 27)
- Place of birth: Novi Sad, FR Yugoslavia
- Height: 1.97 m (6 ft 6 in)
- Position: Centre-back

Team information
- Current team: PSM Makassar
- Number: 43

Youth career
- Vojvodina

Senior career*
| Years | Team | Apps | (Gls) |
| 2017–2019 | Mladost Bački Jarak | | |
| 2019–2020 | Modriča | 8 | (0) |
| 2020–2023 | Ripensia Timișoara | 39 | (1) |
| 2023–2024 | Dumbrăvița | 9 | (0) |
| 2024 | Unirea Alba Iulia | 3 | (0) |
| 2024–2025 | Mladost Novi Sad | 31 | (1) |
| 2025–2026 | Nakhon Ratchasima | 28 | (2) |
| 2026– | PSM Makassar | 3 | (0) |
- * Club domestic league appearances and goals as of 16 October 2026

Nenad Lalić (Serbian Cyrillic: Ненад Лалић; born 5 April 1999) is a Serbian professional footballer who plays as a centre-back for Super League club PSM Makassar.

== Club career ==
Born in Novi Sad, Lalić represented Vojvodina as a youth, then Lalić developed his professional senior career, representing first senior club Mladost Bački Jarak. The following season, he moved abroad for the first time to Modriča in Bosnia and Herzegovina.

In July 2020, Lalić joined Liga II club Ripensia Timișoara in Romania. He made his Liga II debut on 17 October 2020, in a 0–2 home lose over Metaloglobus București. On 7 November 2020, he scored his first league goal for the club, which proved to be the game-winner in a 1–0 victory over Concordia Chiajna. Lalić subsequently joined another Liga II club Dumbrăvița, before signed a contract with Liga III club Unirea Alba Iulia in February 2024.

=== Nakhon Ratchasima ===
On 29 June 2025, he moved to Asia to sign with Thai League 1 club Nakhon Ratchasima for the 2025–26 Thai League 1 campaign. He made his league debut on 16 August 2025, in a 0–0 draw over Chonburi. He enjoyed a highly consistent season in Thailand, recording 30 appearances and netting three goals in all competitions.

=== PSM Makassar ===
On 12 August 2026, Lalić officially completed a transfer to Indonesian top-flight PSM Makassar ahead of the 2026–27 Super League campaign. He revealed that the project mapped out by the management and the stature of manager Darije Kalezić were primary factors influencing his decision to join the squad.
