= Gabriel Oliveira (footballer, born 2002) =

Brazilian footballer (born 2002)

Personal information
- Full name: Gabriel da Silva Oliveira
- Date of birth: 17 June 2002 (age 24)
- Place of birth: Brazil
- Height: 1.80 m (5 ft 11 in)
- Position: Defensive midfielder

Team information
- Current team: Borneo Samarinda
- Number: 65

Youth career
- Santos U20
- 2022: Ponte Preta U20
- 2022–2024: Coimbra U20

Senior career*
Years	Team	Apps	(Gls)
2023	→ Vila Nova (loan)	4	(0)
2023	→ Boa Esporte (loan)	20	(0)
2024	→ Vila Nova (loan)	2	(0)
2024	→ Valeriodoce (loan)	2	(0)
2025	Camboriú	7	(0)
2025–2026	Bahrain SC		
2026–	Borneo Samarinda	5	(0)
- * Club domestic league appearances and goals as of 27 October 2026

Gabriel da Silva Oliveira (born 17 June 2002), commonly known as Gabriel Oliveira, is a Brazilian professional footballer who plays as a defensive midfielder for Super League club Borneo Samarinda.

== Club career ==
Oliveira developed his early youth profile with the Brazilian academy structure at Santos U20, Ponte Preta U20, and Coimbra U20. During his early professional developments, he went on consecutive loan spells representing lower-tier regional sides Vila Nova and Boa Esporte. He subsequently moved abroad to Asia, penning a contract with Bahrain SC to play in the first division of the Bahraini league system.

In July 2026, Indonesian Super League side Borneo Samarinda officially finalized the permanent signing of Oliveira to fill the club's defensive midfield slot ahead of the 2026–27 Super League campaign. He made his league debut for Borneo on 5 September 2026, coming on as a starter in a 0–1 lose against Persija Jakarta at the Segiri Stadium.
