= Ahmad Amiruddin =

Indonesian footballer

Personal information
- Date of birth: 3 October 1982 (age 44)
- Place of birth: Bone, Indonesia
- Height: 1.73 m (5 ft 8 in)
- Positions: Forward; winger

Youth career
- 2003: Tim Pra PON Sulawesi Selatan
- 2003: PSM Makassar

Senior career*
Years	Team	Apps	(Gls)
2004–2009	PSM Makassar	36	(17)
2009–2010	Persiram Raja Ampat	12	(2)
2010–2011	Arema Indonesia	14	(4)
2011	Arema Indonesia (IPL)	2	(2)
2011	Deltras	1	(0)
2011–2013	Mitra Kukar	18	(0)
2014–2016	Pusamania Borneo	13	(0)
Total		96	(25)

International career
2006–2007	Indonesia	2	(0)

Managerial career
- 2016–2022: Borneo (assistant coach)
- 2022–: PSM Makassar (assistant coach)
- 2025: PSM Makassar (caretaker)
- 2026–: PSM Makassar (caretaker)
- * Club domestic league appearances and goals

Ahmad Amiruddin (born 3 October 1982) is an Indonesian former footballer. He is currently the caretaker head coach of Indonesia Super League club PSM Makassar.

== International career ==
Amiruddin played in two matches for the Indonesia national football team at the 2006 Merdeka Tournament. He was also a squad member at the 2007 ASEAN Football Championship, but did not appear in any matches. Amiruddin was named as a reserve for the Asian Cup 2007, but did not appear in any matches.

== Managerial statistics ==
As of match played 23 May 2026

Managerial record by team and tenure
Team	Nat.	From	To	Record					Ref.
Team	Nat.	From	To	G	W	D	L	Win %	Ref.
PSM Makassar (caretaker)	(Indonesia)	4 October 2025	2 November 2025	3	0	2	1	0.00	
PSM Makassar (caretaker)	(Indonesia)	3 March 2026	Present	10	3	2	5	30.00	
Career Total				13	3	4	6	23.08	
