= Gelora B.J. Habibie Stadium =

Stadium in South Sulawesi, Indonesia

Stadion Gelora B. J. Habibie
- Stadion Gelora B.J. Habibie
- Interactive map of Stadion Gelora B. J. Habibie
- Former names: Gelora Mandiri Stadium
- Location: Parepare, South Sulawesi, Indonesia
- Coordinates: 4.036531°S 119.645606°E
- Owner: Government of the South Sulawesi Province
- Operator: Government of Parepare City
- Capacity: 8,500 (seated)
- Surface: Grass
- Record attendance: 18,436 (PSM Makassar v Bali United (29 July 2022)
- Field size: 105 by 68 m (344 by 223 ft)

Construction
- Opened: 2001; 25 years ago
- Renovated: 2014–2015; 2024
- Cost: IDR 5 billion (2014–2015); IDR 113 billion (2024)
- General contractors: Parepare Municipal Public Works Department; PT. Pagolona Sulawesi Mandiri

Tenants
- PSM Makassar (2022–present); Persipare Parepare (2001–present)

Gelora B.J. Habibie Stadium (Indonesian: Stadion Gelora B.J. Habibie), formerly known as Gelora Mandiri Stadium, is a multi-purpose stadium located in Parepare, South Sulawesi, Indonesia. It is mostly used for football matches. The stadium is named after B.J. Habibie, the then-president of Indonesia as a form of respect for him who was born in Parepare City.

== History ==
The Stadium was officially used in 2001 with the Parepare City Public Works Service and PT Pagolona Sulawesi Mandiri as the general contractor. The stadium, which is currently the headquarters of PSM Makassar, has a long history of being renovated.

It was noted that in order to smoothen PSM Makassar's steps to make the Gelora B.J. Habibie Stadium as its headquarters, PSM Makassar's management provided a budget of IDR 5 billion for the cost of stadium renovations carried out in 2014.

Apart from being the headquarters of PSM Makassar, Gelora B.J. Habibie Stadium is also famous for having hosted various national competitions, starting from the 2005 to 2007 edition of the Indonesian Cup, the 2007 to 2008 edition of the Indonesian League First Division, and most recently holding the BRI Liga 1 Indonesia 2022–2023 season. Apart from the national level competition, Gelora BJ Habibie Stadium is also famous as the venue for the Habibie Cup, which is a local level competition with participants coming from football clubs from South Sulawesi.

On 18 March 2024, the stadium was completely renovated by the Ministry of Public Works (Indonesia) with a budget of IDR 113 billion and the renovation is targeted for completion in December 2024.
