= Perkebunan Nusantara IX =

Indonesian agricultural company

PT Perkebunan Nusantara IX
- Company type: Subsidiary PT
- Industry: agriculture
- Founded: 1996; 30 years ago
- Headquarters: Jl. Mugas Dalam (Atas) Semarang, Central Java, Indonesia
- Products: sugar cane, rubber, coffee and tea
- Parent: PTPN III
- Website: www.ptpn9.co.id

PT Perkebunan Nusantara IX (Persero) (abbreviated as PTPN IX), is an Indonesian state-owned agricultural company for the cultivation and processing of sugar cane, rubber, tea and coffee. Its own plantations and factories are located at locations in Central Java.

== History ==
The company was created in 1996 by merging PT Perkebunan XV – XVI (Persero) and PT Perkebunan XVIII (Persero).

The sugar mills, which had been founded in large numbers especially in Java since the 1850s – privately or under the direction of larger companies active in the Dutch East Indies, such as the Nederlandse Handels Maatschappij NHM, the Nederlandsch Indische Landbouw Maatschappij NIS or the Klattensche Cultuur Maatschappij KCM – become Indonesian state property in 1957.

The sites now operated by PTPN 9 traded after nationalization at the end of the 1950s as Perusahaan Negara Perkebunan, abbreviated as PNP, which means a state company for the plantations. In the 1970s these were reorganized as PT Perkebunan, state-owned limited company for the plantations. PTP XV-XVI respectively its predecessor company PNP XV-XVI had built itself from the merger of PNP XV with PNP XVI before.

All of these companies are State-owned enterprises (Indonesian: Badan Usaha Milik Negara (BUMN)).

The headquarters of PTPN 9, founded in 1996, is in Semarang.

== Company ==
The name PT Perkebunan Nusantara is the name of a Perseroan Terbatas, abbreviated PT, a limited liability company under Indonesian law, which - under state ownership - is engaged in plantation cultivation. All of the large state-owned agricultural companies (Perkebunan Nusantara) in Indonesia are grouped into different departments according to their subject-matter and regional responsibilities. PTPN 9 is 90% owned by the Indonesian state through PT Perkebunan Nusantara III (Persero) Holding, and another 10% are directly owned by the state (Negara Kesatuan Republic of Indonesia). The share of PTPN III is estimated at 1.4 trillion Indonesian rupiah.

Perkebunan means plantation and Nusantara is a synonym for the Indonesian archipelago or the national territory of Indonesia. PT PN 9 is to a third also co-owner of the Cepiring sugar factory (PG Tjepiring) in the Kendal district, which closed in 1997. That partially privatized sugar factory was newly reopened at the old location under the name of PT Industri Gula Nusantara (IGN), . To a small extent, one is also co-owner of a research plantation (PT Riset Perkebunan Nusantara, share 6.67%) and a marketing company (PT Kharisma Pemasaran Bersama Nusantara, share 7.14%).

For its part, the company is divided into two business areas, on the one hand in the Annual Plant Division (DTT), which is dedicated to the cultivation and processing of rubber, coffee and tea, and on the other hand in the Plant Annuals (DTS) (sugar factory), the cultivation of sugar and manufacture of sugarcane products.

In addition to fields of activity that have changed little at the locations of the factories since colonial rule, PTPN 9 also produces and markets ground coffee under the name Kampoeng Kopi Banaran, Kaligula tea and nutmeg syrup .

In 2018, about half of the total revenue of 530 billion Indonesian rupees (IDR) came from the cultivation and marketing of rubber. A quarter contributed the proceeds from the cultivation and processing of sugar cane. All other activities together achieved around 10% of the total result.

For the cultivation of rubber you have your own usable plantations in an order of 19,000 hectares, while for tea and coffee there are only just under 1,000 hectares each.

PTPN 9 includes the sugar factories (including the recently temporarily or permanently closed locations):

Slavi district - PG Pangka formerly PTP XV

Pemalang District - PG Sumberharjo formerly PTP XV, closed in 2016

Kudu District - PG Rendeng formerly PTP XV

Sragen District - PG Mojo

Karanganyar District - PG Tasikmadu formerly PTP XVI

Klaten District - PG Gondang Baru formerly PTP XVI, closed in 2017

Pekalongan District - PG Sragi formerly PTP XV

Brebes District - PG Jatibarang formerly PTP XV, closed in 2017

Furthermore, the 1997 with the end of the season closed sugar factories PG Kalibagor (belonging to theearlier PTP XVI company) in the district of Purwokerto, PG Banjaratma ( formerly PTP XV ) in the district of Tegal, PG Colomadu (formerly PTP XVI) in the district of Karanganyar, PG Cepiring (formerly PTP XV) in the Kendal district and PG Ceper Baru (formerly PTP XVI) in the Klaten district. For its works railway, which was closed in 2015, PG Sragi last used the still existing parts of facilities of the neighboring PG Comal, which was mostly destroyed in the Second World War.

PTPN 9 owns rubber plantations (kebun means garden) and factories for its processing at

Karanganyar District - Kebun Batujamus

Cilacap District - Kebun Warnasari and Kebung Kawung

Banyumas District - Kebun Krumbut

Pekalongan District - Kebun Blimbing

Batang District - Kebun Siluwok

District Kendal - Kebun Merbuh and im

Jepara District - Kebun Balong

Both rubber and coffee are grown at the facilities in Kendal District - Kebun Sukamangli and Semarang District - Kebun Getas and Kebun Ngobo.

The company owns another coffee plantation in the Pati - Kebun Jollong district.

There are tea plantations and factories in Brebes District - Kebun Kaligua and Pemalang - Kebun Semugih District.

There is also a mixed tea and rubber plant in the Pekalongan - Kebun Jolotigo district.

In addition to its core business, PTPN 9 also operates the so-called agrotourism in the Kampoeng Kopi Banaran amusement park at the Getas Afdeling Assinan coffee plantation on the Semarang - Salatiga road near Bawen. A facility with a coffee house, swimming pool, conference rooms and sports facilities. In the complex is also the Banaran 9 Resort with various accommodations and conference rooms with a view of the Rawa Pening Lake and the Gunung Ungaran volcano. At the sugar factory PG Gondang Baru (Gondang Winangoen) a sugar museum and a coffee house were built in 1982. With the former sugar cane railways at PG Gongang Baru, PG Jatibarang, PG Pangka, PG Sumberharjo as well as PG Tasikmadu, you can still drive on a circular route at the factories area. The field lines for railways are close everywhere.
