= PSM Makassar =

Association football club in Makassar, Indonesia

- Full name: Persatuan Sepakbola Makassar
- Nicknames: Juku Eja (Red Fish); Ayam Jantan dari Timur (The Roosters of the East); Pasukan Ramang (Ramang's Squad)
- Short name: PSM
- Founded: 2 November 1915; 111 years ago as Makassarche Voetbalbond
- Ground: Gelora B.J. Habibie Stadium
- Capacity: 8,500
- Owner: PT Persaudaraan Sepak Bola Makassar
- CEO: Sadikin Aksa
- Head coach: Darije Kalezić
- League: Indonesia Super League
- 2025–26: 15th of 18
- Website: www.psmmakassar.co.id
Home colours	Away colours	Third colours

Persatuan Sepakbola Makassar (lit. 'Football Association of Makassar') commonly referred to as PSM Makassar, is an Indonesian professional football club based in Makassar, South Sulawesi that currently competes in the Super League, the top flight of Indonesian football.

PSM was founded in 1915 as Makassarche Voetbalbond, making it one of the oldest active national clubs. They are also considered one of the most successful clubs in Indonesia, mostly due to their success in the pre-professional era of Indonesian football. In the 2001 season, they became the second Indonesian club to reach the quarterfinals of an Asian-level tournament, Asian Club Championship. PSM Makassar has won two Liga 1 titles and one Piala Indonesia in the club history.

== History ==
=== Foundation and early years (1915–1942) ===
PSM Makassar was founded on 2 November 1915 as Makassarsche Voetbalbond (MVB). They are considered the oldest competitive football club in Indonesia and one of the oldest in the Southeast Asia. MVB changed its name to Persatuan Sepakbola Makassar during the 1942–45 Japanese occupation of the Dutch East Indies that forced all organizations with Dutch names to be renamed.

=== Perserikatan era (1942–1994) ===
Some of the early players of PSM Makassar were regularly called to the Indonesia national football team, the most famous of them was the club legend Ramang. PSM won their first Perserikatan title in 1957 after defeating PSMS Medan. They also managed to win this national amateur championship in 1959, 1965, 1966 and 1992.

=== Modern era (1994–2018) ===
After the merger of Perserikatan and Galatama in 1994 that led to the professionalization of teams that once mainly depend on the local government budget, PSM won their first and only national title in 2000. The squad combined national team players such as Miro Baldo Bento, Aji Santoso, Bima Sakti, Kurniawan Dwi Yulianto and Hendro Kartiko, and local talents Ronny Ririn, Syamsudin Batola, Yusrifar Djafar, and Rachman Usman. They won the 1999–2000 Liga Indonesia Premier Division.

==== AFC Champions League debut ====
PSM Makassar qualified to the 2004 AFC Champions League group stage as 2003 Liga Indonesia Premier Division runners-up. On 5 May, they recorded their first-ever win against Vietnamese club Hoang Anh Gia Lai, by 2–0. In the next match on 18 May, the club recorded their second win, 2–1 against Krung Thai Bank. However, PSM finished bottom of the table losing 4 of their matches. In the following year, PSM qualified to the 2005 AFC Champions League, finishing in third place.

PSM Makassar in 2011 joined the breakaway league and continued to play in the Indonesian Premier League organized by PT Liga Prima Indonesia Sportindo until 2013, before joining the Indonesia Super League again in the 2014 season.

=== Domestic honours and continental campaigns (2018–2025) ===
PSM Makassar players celebrating winning their 2022–23 Liga 1 title

In 2019, PSM Makassar qualified for the 2019 AFC Cup after finishing as 2018 Liga 1 runners-up, marking their return to the continental tournament since 2005. The club was drawn in Group H alongside Home United, Kaya–Iloilo Lao Toyota. PSM Makassar finished as group leader with four wins and two draws, thus qualifying for the Zonal semi-finals and facing off against Becamex Binh Duong. During the second leg, Aaron Evans scored a late-minute goal to equalise the aggregate at 2–2, but PSM was knocked from the tournament due to the away goals rule. PSM Makassar then won the 2018–19 Piala Indonesia against Persija, 2–1 on aggregate. While en route to the final, the club survived on away goals rule in the quarter-finals match against Bhayangkara, drawing 4–4 and qualifying to the semi-finals against Madura United. The cup win guaranteed PSM Makassar to qualify for the 2020 AFC Cup qualifying play-off where they faced Lalenok United, thrashing them 7–2 in the process. However, halfway throughout the tournament, the matches were suspended due to the COVID-19 pandemic.

In 2021, PSM sacked head coach, Milomir Šešlija mainly because of the poor performance in the first half of the season.

==== Liga 1 champions ====

2022–23 Liga 1-winning team

Under Portuguese coach Bernardo Tavares, PSM performed well in the 2022 AFC Cup where they progressed to the zonal finals, before losing 5–2 to Kuala Lumpur City. However, the progress did not stop as their second league title came in the 2022–23 season with 22 wins, 9 draws and 3 losses, overall 75 points. PSM qualified for the 2023–24 AFC Cup, being drawn with Hải Phòng, Hougang United, and Sabah. PSM Makassar crashed out of the tournament after finishing in third place.

PSM Makassar then participated in the revived 2024–25 ASEAN Club Championship, being placed alongside BG Pathum United, Đông Á Thanh Hóa, Terengganu, Preah Khan Reach Svay Rieng, and Shan United. PSM Makassar played their home matches at the Batakan Stadium in Balikpapan and hosted the opening match of the tournament against BG Pathum United on 21 August 2024, ending as a 0–0 draw. On 5 February 2025, PSM Makassar won 3–0 against Vietnamese club Đông Á Thanh Hóa which sees the club qualified to the knockout stage as group runners-up alongside Thailand club BG Pathum United.

Following the conclusion of the 2024–25 season, PSM Makassar competed in the newly rebranded 2025–26 Indonesian Super League. Head coach Bernardo Tavares departed the club on 1 October 2025 whereby the club then appointed Czechia Tomáš Trucha as head coach on 28 October 2025. However, PSM struggled for consistency throughout the season and finished 15th in the league with 34 points from 34 matches, narrowly avoiding relegation. Trucha left the club at the end of May 2026.

=== Recent struggles (2026–present) ===
PSM Makassar began the 2026–27 season under head coach Darije Kalezić. The club strengthened its squad during the transfer window where they also retained several Indonesian players as it sought to improve on its performance in the previous season. However, PSM endured a difficult start to the campaign, recording two draws and two defeats in its opening four league matches.

== Stadium ==
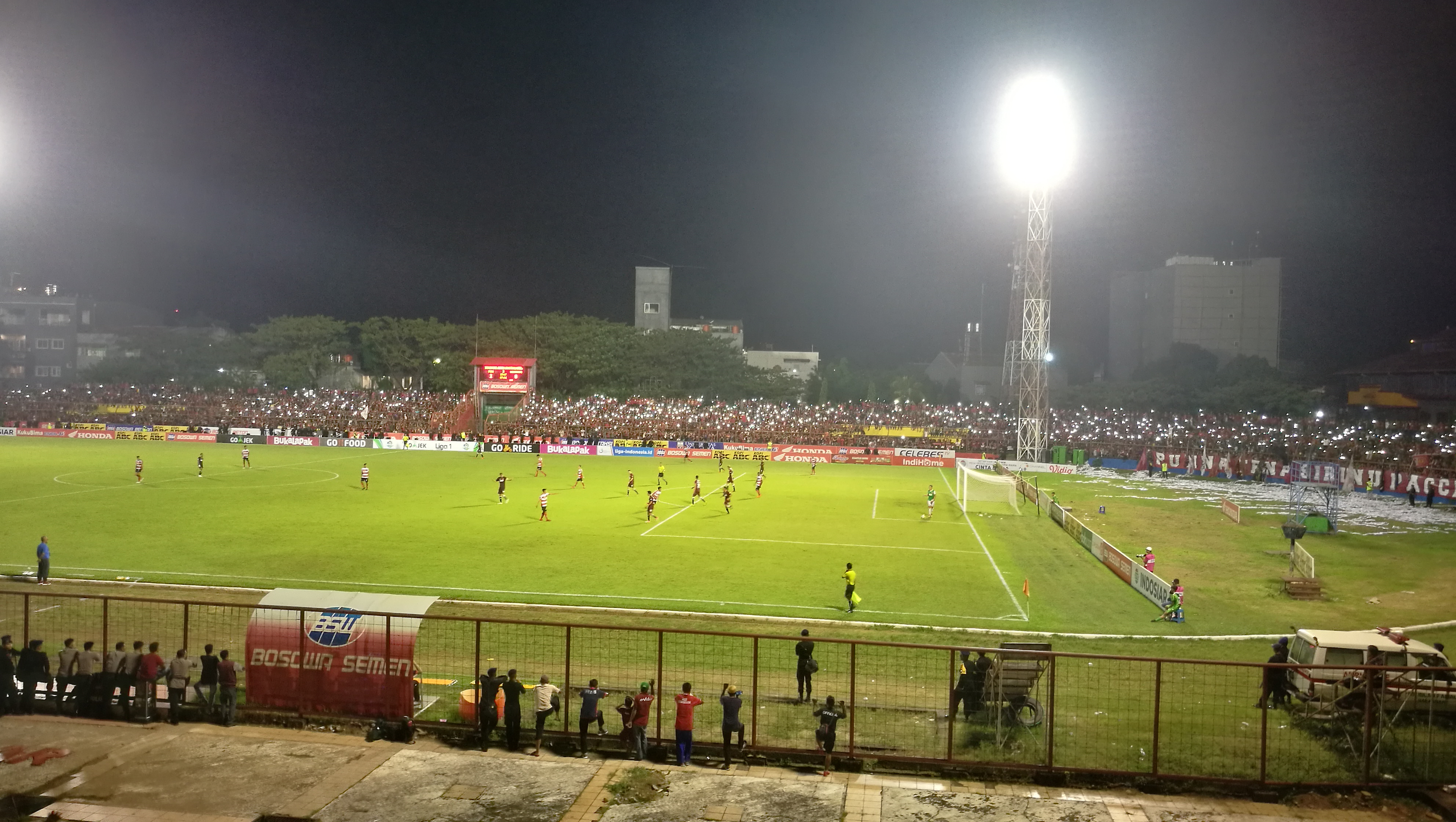
Andi Mattalatta Stadium – former stadium

PSM Makassar formerly played its home matches at Andi Mattalatta Stadium, also known as Mattoangin, in Makassar, South Sulawesi. Opened on 6 July 1957, the stadium had a capacity of approximately 15,000 spectators and served as the club's home ground for decades. It hosted the fourth edition of the National Sports Week in 1957 before being demolished on 21 October 2020. The stadium was first renovated in 2000 for the 2000–01 Asian Club Championship.

Gelora B.J. Habibie Stadium – current stadium

Following its demolition, PSM relocated its home matches to Gelora B. J. Habibie Stadium in Parepare, approximately 150 kilometres north of Makassar. Formerly known as Gelora Mandiri Stadium, the venue opened in 2001 and was renamed in honour of former Indonesian president B. J. Habibie, who was born in Parepare. The stadium underwent renovations, including a major redevelopment in 2024, and has served as PSM's home ground since the 2022–23 season

Due to a lack of venues that meet AFC requirements in South Sulawesi, PSM has been playing their continental matches outside the province in recent years, namely at the Pakansari Stadium in Cibinong (2019 AFC Cup), Gelora Bung Karno Madya Stadium in Jakarta (2020 AFC Cup), Kapten I Wayan Dipta Stadium in Gianyar (2022 AFC Cup and 2023–24 AFC Cup).

== Team image ==
=== Crest and colours ===
PSM's most popular nickname is Juku Eja (Red Fish), in reference to the red shirt club has used since its foundation, and Makassar's reputation as a port city. The common home kit includes a red shirt, red or white shorts, and white socks. The crest is also dominantly red with a traditional Pinisi ship. The away kit of the club is associated with a white or black background. Blue was adopted as the club's primary colour for their away kit in 2015.

Crest of PSM Makassar (1999–2007)

=== Rivalries ===
==== Persija Jakarta ====
The rivalry with Persija Jakarta has been going on since the Perserikatan era with matches being fierce and tough. The rivalry did not reach hostile levels before the establishment of Persija's fan club The Jakmania.

==== Java United ====
The match between Liga 1 clubs Java United and PSM Makassar is a new rivalry. Both clubs come from Eastern Indonesia and have the same logo and home uniform color, so they are also nicknamed the Eastern Indonesia Red derby. The first match between the two will only take place in the 2024–25 Liga 1 season, where only then will Java United be promoted from the 2023–24 Liga 2 season with the third-place status. The match on 17 December 2024 ended in a 2–2 draw at the Gelora Kie Raha Stadium, it was the first match between them.

== Kit suppliers and shirt sponsors ==
Period	Kit manufacturer	Shirt sponsors
1994–1995	(Germany) Adidas	(England) Dunhill
1995–1996	(Germany) Adidas	(Japan) Toyota
1996–1997	(Germany) Adidas	(Indonesia) Kansas
1998–2000	(England) Reebok	No sponsors
2000–2002	(United States) Nike	(Mexico) Cemex
2002	In house production	No sponsors
2003–2005	(Germany) Adidas	(Indonesia) Semen Bosowa
2006	In house production	No sponsors
2007–2008	(Indonesia) Vilour	No sponsors
2008–2009	(Italy) Diadora	(Indonesia) Semen Bosowa
2009–2010	(Indonesia) Specs	(Indonesia) Semen Bosowa
2010–2013	(Indonesia) Vilour	(Indonesia) Semen Bosowa
2013–2016	(United States) Nike	(Indonesia) Semen Bosowa
2017	(Spain) Kelme	(Indonesia) Semen Bosowa
2018–2020	(England) Umbro	(Indonesia) Semen Bosowa
2021–2022	In house production	(Japan) Honda^{1} / (Indonesia) Semen Bosowa^{2}
2022–2024	(Indonesia) Rewako	(Japan) Honda^{1} / (Indonesia) Semen Bosowa^{2}
2024–2025	(Indonesia) DRX	(Japan) Honda^{1} / (Indonesia) Semen Bosowa^{2}
2025–present	(Germany) Adidas	(Japan) Honda^{1} / (Indonesia) Semen Bosowa^{2}

^{1} ^{Main sponsorship for domestic competitions}
^{2} ^{Main sponsorship for AFC competitions}

== Players ==
=== Current squad ===
As of September 2026

Note: Flags indicate national team as defined under FIFA eligibility rules; some limited exceptions apply. Players may hold more than one non-FIFA nationality.

No.	Pos.	Nation	Player
1	GK	IDN	Muhammad Ardiansyah
2	DF	BRA	Aloísio Neto
6	MF	IDN	Resky Fandi
7	FW	RSA	Lars Veldwijk
8	MF	MKD	Stefan Jevtoski
9	FW	SRB	Luka Čumić
10	MF	IDN	Navarone Foor
11	FW	SRB	Luka Bulatović
14	MF	JPN	Kodai Tanaka
16	MF	MAS	Ezequiel Agüero
17	MF	IDN	Rasyid Bakri (vice-captain)
18	MF	IDN	Gala Pagamo
22	DF	BRA	Victor Luiz (3rd captain)
24	MF	IDN	Rizky Eka Pratama (5th captain)

No.	Pos.	Nation	Player
27	DF	IDN	Henhen Herdiana (on loan from Persib Bandung)
28	FW	IDN	Arham Darmawan
29	MF	IDN	Fahrul Aditia
43	DF	SRB	Nenad Lalić
45	MF	IDN	Akbar Tanjung
47	DF	IDN	Agung Mannan
48	MF	IDN	Muhammad Arfan (4th captain)
51	GK	IDN	Syaiful Syamsuddin
71	MF	IDN	Mufli Hidayat
81	FW	IDN	Abdul Rahman
88	MF	IDN	Ananda Raehan
94	DF	MNE	Dušan Lagator (captain)
97	GK	IDN	Hilmansyah

=== Out on loan ===
Note: Flags indicate national team as defined under FIFA eligibility rules; some limited exceptions apply. Players may hold more than one non-FIFA nationality.

No.	Pos.	Nation	Player
—	MF	JPN	Daisuke Sakai (at Young Lions)

== Management and staff ==
As of 28 October 2025

Management
Team director	(Indonesia) Sadikin Aksa
Manager team	(Indonesia) Muhammad Nurfajrin
General director	(Indonesia) Irsal Ohorella
Accounting director	(Indonesia) Ahmad Muhiddin
Secretary	(Indonesia) Muhammad Iko
Media officer	(Indonesia) Sulaeman Karim
Technical staff
Head coach	(Bosnia and Herzegovina) Darije Kalezić
Assistant coaches	(Indonesia) Ahmad Amiruddin
Goalkeeper coaches	(Bosnia and Herzegovina) Velibor Pudar
Goalkeeper coaches	(Indonesia) Iman Suherman
Physical coach	(Serbia) Alexander Ilic
Chief analyst	(Serbia) Krsto Jokic
Video analyst	(Indonesia) Angger Woro Jati
Interpreter	(Indonesia) Roywanson Siringoringo
Medical staff
Team doctor	(Indonesia) Dr. Hardiansyah Muslimin
Nutritionists	(Indonesia) Dr. Mufliha Paremma
Nutritionists	(Indonesia) Dr. Faradillah Anwar
Physiotherapist	(Indonesia) Wahyu Iriandy
Physiotherapist	(Serbia) Srdn Stojanovic

== Honours ==
Type	Honours	Titles	Seasons
League	Liga Indonesia Premier Division/Super League	2	1999–2000, 2022–23
League	Perserikatan	5	1955–57, 1957–59, 1964–65, 1965–66, 1991–92
Cup	Piala Indonesia	1	2018–19
Cup	Piala Presiden Soeharto	1	1974
Others	Ho Chi Minh City Cup	1	2001

Bold is for those competition that are currently active.

=== AFC ===
- AFC Champions League Elite/AFC Champions League/Asian Club Championship/Asian Champion Club Tournament
  - 2000–01 – Quarter-finals
- Asian Cup Winners' Cup
  - 1997–98 – Quarter-finals
- AFC Champions League Two/AFC Cup
  - 2022 – ASEAN Zonal Final

=== AFF ===
- ASEAN Club Championship
  - 2024–25 – Semi-final

== Award winners ==
=== Domestic ===
- Player of the Season
  - (Indonesia) Bima Sakti (1999–00)
  - (Indonesia) Ponaryo Astaman (2004)
  - (Netherlands) Wiljan Pluim (2022–23)
- League Golden Boot
  - (Chile) Óscar Aravena (2003)
- Coach of the Season
  - (Portugal) Bernardo Tavares (2022–23)
- Team of the Season
  - (Netherlands) Wiljan Pluim (2017, 2022–23)
  - (Indonesia) Hamka Hamzah (2017)
  - (Indonesia) Asnawi Mangkualam (2019)
  - (Indonesia) Yance Sayuri (2022–23)
  - (Indonesia) Yakob Sayuri (2022–23)
  - (Cape Verde) Yuran Fernandes (2022–23)
  - (Brazil) Victor Luiz (2024–25)

=== Continental ===
==== ASEAN Club Championship ====
- Team of the Tournament
  - (Slovenia) Nermin Haljeta (2024–25)

== Records and statistics ==
As of 15 October 2026.

Top 10 all-time appearances
Rank	Player	Years	Club appearances
1	(Indonesia) Muhammad Arfan	2017–present	209
2	(Indonesia) Rizky Eka Pratama	2016–present	204
3	(Indonesia) Rasyid Bakri	2011–present	179
4	(Indonesia) Rahmat	2008–2019	181
5	(Netherlands) Wiljan Pluim	2016–2023	178
6	(Indonesia) Akbar Tanjung	2022–present	142
7	(Indonesia) Rizky Pellu	2016–2021, 2023–2025	138
8	(Cape Verde) Yuran Fernandes	2022–2026	133
9	(Indonesia) Ananda Raehan	2022–present	128
10	(Indonesia) Ferdinan Sinaga	2016–2017, 2018–2021, 2022	126

Top 10 all-time goalscorers
Rank	Player	Club appearances	Total goals
1	(Indonesia) Ferdinan Sinaga	126	47
1	(Netherlands) Wiljan Pluim	178	47
3	(Indonesia) Cristian Gonzáles	56	32
4	(Chile) Óscar Aravena	36	31
5	(Indonesia) Zulham Zamrun	75	25
5	(Indonesia) Yakob Sayuri	133	25
7	(Japan) Kenzo Nambu	75	23
8	(Indonesia) Rahmat	181	22
9	(Cape Verde) Yuran Fernandes	133	21
10	(Indonesia) Marc Klok	102	17
11	(Bosnia and Herzegovina) Nermin Haljeta	38	16
11	(Indonesia) Rizky Pellu	138	16

- Biggest wins: 9–0 vs Badak Lampung (16 February 2019)
- Heaviest defeats: 1–8 vs (South Korea) Suwon Samsung Bluewings (23 March 2001)
- Youngest ever debutant: Mufli Hidayat ~ 17 years 4 months 1 day old (On 8 December 2022 vs Persita Tangerang)
- Oldest ever player: Zulkifli Syukur ~ 37 years 10 months 27 days old (On 30 March 2022 vs Arema)
- Youngest goal scorers: Mufli Hidayat ~ 18 years 8 months 18 day old (On 25 April 2024 vs Arema)
- Oldest goal scorers: Andi Oddang ~ 36 years 5 months 3 days old (On 19 February 2014 vs Persiba Bantul)

== Notable players ==
This list includes players whom have made significant contributions to the club. Bold indicates players still active in this club.

=== Domestic players ===
- (Indonesia) Andi Ramang
- (Indonesia) Suardi Arlan
- (Indonesia) Nursalam
- (Indonesia) Ronny Pattinasarany
- (Indonesia) Yopie Lumoindong
- (Indonesia) Alimuddin Usman
- (Indonesia) Ansar Abdullah
- (Indonesia) Mukti Ali Raja
- (Indonesia) Yusrifar Djafar
- (Indonesia) Bahar Muharram
- (Indonesia) Rahman Usman
- (Indonesia) Ronny Ririn
- (Indonesia) Ali Baba
- (Indonesia) Syamsuddin Batola
- (Indonesia) M. Askar
- (Indonesia) Rolly Yasin
- (Indonesia) Yeyen Tumena
- (Indonesia) Zain Batola
- (Indonesia) Bima Sakti
- (Indonesia) Aji Santoso
- (Indonesia) Hengky Oba
- (Indonesia) **Muhammad Arfan**
- (Indonesia) Kurniawan Dwi Yulianto
- (Indonesia) Hendro Kartiko
- (Indonesia) Kurnia Sandy
- (Indonesia) Budiman Buswir
- (Indonesia) Miro Baldo Bento
- (Indonesia) Ortizan Solossa
- (Indonesia) Jack Komboy
- (Indonesia) Hamka Hamzah
- (Indonesia) Ponaryo Astaman
- (Indonesia) **Rasyid Bakri**
- (Indonesia) **Rizky Eka Pratama**
- (Indonesia) Charis Yulianto
- (Indonesia) Irsyad Aras
- (Indonesia) Ahmad Amiruddin
- (Indonesia) Syamsul Chaeruddin
- (Indonesia) Andi Oddang
- (Indonesia) Zulkifli Syukur
- (Indonesia) Yakob Sayuri
- (Indonesia) Yance Sayuri

=== International capped players ===
As of 2026–27 season.

**AFC****/OFC.**: **(Australia)** Bruce Djite; **(Australia)** Golgol Mebrahtu; **(Australia)** Michael Baird; **(Australia)** Mehmet Duraković; **(Australia)** Peter Makrillos; **(Australia)** Ross Aloisi; **(Australia)** Robert Cornthwaite; (Australia) Steve Pantelidis; (Australia) Taylor Regan; (Hong Kong) Sandro; **(Japan)** Daisuke Sakai; (Kyrgyzstan) Bektur Talgat Uulu; (Lebanon) Hussein El Dor; (Malaysia) Ezequiel Agüero; (Philippines) Kike Linares; (South Korea) Kwon Jun; (Tajikistan) Sheriddin Boboev; (Timor-Leste) João Pedro; (Timor-Leste) Paulo Martins; (Uzbekistan) Pavel Purishkin	**CAF.**: (Cape Verde) Yuran Fernandes; (Republic of the Congo) Jacques Thémopelé; (Guinea-Bissau) Amido Baldé; (Liberia) Abu Kamara; (Liberia) Anthony Jomah Ballah; (South Africa) Lars Veldwijk; (Sierra Leone) Musa Kallon; (South Sudan) Tito Okello; (Togo) Ali Khaddafi; (Togo) Lantame Ouadja	**UEFA.**: (Bosnia and Herzegovina) Šerif Hasić; (Finland) Eero Markkanen; (Montenegro) Dušan Lagator; (Netherlands) Navarone Foor; (North Macedonia) Stefan Jevtoski; (Romania) Claudiu Răducanu; (Serbia) Nemanja Vučićević	**CONMEBOL/** **CONCACAF.**: (United States) Victor Mansaray

== Managerial history ==
Manager	Period	Achievements
(Indonesia) Syamsuddin Umar	1999–2000	1999–2000 Liga Indonesia Premier Division
(Indonesia) M. Basri	2001–2003	
(Czech Republic) Miroslav Janů	2004–2005	
(Germany) Fritz Korbach	2005–2006	
(Brazil) Carlos De Mello	2006–2007	
(Bulgaria) Radoy Minkovski	2007–2008	
(Malaysia) Raja Isa	2008–2009	
(Indonesia) Hanafing	2009–2010	
(Indonesia) Tumpak Sihite	2010	
(Netherlands) Robert Alberts	2010–2011	
(Netherlands) Wim Rijsbergen	2011	
(Croatia) Petar Segrt	2011–2013	
(Indonesia) Imran Amirullah	2013	
(Germany) Jörg Steinebrunner	2013–2014	
(Indonesia) Rudy Keltjes	2014	
(Austria) Alfred Riedl	2015	
(Austria) Hans-Peter Schaller	2015	
(Indonesia) Assegaf Razak	2015	
(Indonesia) Liestiadi	2015–2016	
(Brazil) Luciano Leandro	2016	
(Netherlands) Robert Alberts	2016–2019	2018–19 Piala Indonesia
(Bosnia and Herzegovina) Darije Kalezić	2019	
(Croatia) Bojan Hodak	2020	
(Indonesia) Syamsuddin Batola	2021	
(Bosnia and Herzegovina) Milomir Šešlija	2021	
(Netherlands) Joop Gall	2021–2022	
(Portugal) Bernardo Tavares	2022–2025	2022–23 Liga 1
(Czech Republic) Tomáš Trucha	2025–2026	
(Indonesia) Ahmad Amiruddin (caretaker)	2026	
(Bosnia and Herzegovina) Darije Kalezić	2026–present	

== Season by season record ==
Season(s)	League/division	Position	Tms.	Piala Indonesia	I-League Cup	AFC competition(s)		AFF competition(s)	
1994–95	Premier Division	10th, East Division	34	–	–	–	–	–	–
1995–96	Premier Division	Runner-up	31	–	–	Asian Club Championship	First round	–	–
1996–97	Premier Division	Semi-final	33	–	–	–	–	–	–
1997–98	Premier Division	did not finish	31	–	–	Asian Cup Winners' Cup	Quarter-final	–	–
1998–99	Premier Division	Second round	28	–	–	–	–	–	–
1999–00	Premier Division	1	28	–	–	–	–	–	–
2001	Premier Division	Runners-up	28	–	–	Asian Club Championship	Quarter-final	–	–
2002	Premier Division	Semi-final	24	–	–	Asian Cup Winners' Cup	First round	–	–
2003	Premier Division	Runners-up	20	–	–	–	–	–	–
2004	Premier Division	Runners-up	18	–	–	AFC Champions League	Group stage	–	–
2005	Premier Division	Second round	28	Second round	–	AFC Champions League	Group stage	–	–
2006	Premier Division	Second round	28	Second round	–	–	–	–	–
2007–08	Premier Division	5th, East Division	36	Third round	–	–	–	–	–
2008–09	Indonesia Super League	8	18	First round	–	–	–	–	–
2009–10	Indonesia Super League	13	18	Second round	–	–	–	–	–
2011	Liga Primer Indonesia	3	19	–	–	–	–	–	–
2011–12	Indonesia Premier League	6	12	Third round	–	–	–	–	–
2013	Indonesia Premier League	6	16	–	–	–	–	–	–
2014	Indonesia Super League	7th, East Division	22	–	–	–	–	–	–
2015	Indonesia Super League	did not finish	18	–	–	–	–	–	–
2016	Indonesia Soccer Championship A	6	18	–	–	–	–	–	–
2017	Liga 1	3	18	–	–	–	–	–	–
2018	Liga 1	2	18	Champions	–	–	–	–	
2019	Liga 1	12	18	Champions	–	AFC Cup	ASEAN Zone Semi-final	–	–
2020	Liga 1	did not finish	18	–	–	AFC Cup	did not finish	–	–
2021–22	Liga 1	14	18	–	–	–	–	–	–
2022–23	Liga 1	1	18	–	–	AFC Cup	ASEAN Zone Final	–	–
2023–24	Liga 1	11	18	–	–	AFC Cup	ASEAN Zone Group stage	–	–
2024–25	Liga 1	6	18	–	–	–	–	ASEAN Club Championship	Semi-final
2025–26	Super League	15	18	–	–	–	–	–	–
2026–27	Super League	TBD	18	–	–	–	–	–	–

Key

- Tms. = Number of teams
- Pos. = Position in league

== Performance in AFC competitions ==
Season	Competition	Round	Nat	Club	Home	Away
1996–97	Asian Club Championship (present: AFC Champions League Elite)	First round	(South Korea)	Pohang Steelers	1–0	0–4
1997–98	Asian Cup Winners' Cup	Second round	(Thailand)	Royal Thai Air Force	0–0	2–1
1997–98	Asian Cup Winners' Cup	Quarter-final	(South Korea)	Suwon Samsung Bluewings	0–1	0–12
2000–01	Asian Club Championship (present: AFC Champions League Elite)	First round	(Vietnam)	Sông Lam Nghệ An	0–0	4–1
2000–01	Asian Club Championship (present: AFC Champions League Elite)	Second round	(Thailand)	Royal Thai Air Force	6–1	5–0
2000–01	Asian Club Championship (present: AFC Champions League Elite)	Quarter-final	(China)	Shandong Luneng Taishan	1–3	
2000–01	Asian Club Championship (present: AFC Champions League Elite)	Quarter-final	(South Korea)	Suwon Samsung Bluewings	1–8	
2000–01	Asian Club Championship (present: AFC Champions League Elite)	Quarter-final	(Japan)	Júbilo Iwata	0–3	
2001–02	Asian Cup Winners' Cup	First round	(Maldives)	Victory	2–1	0–3
2004	AFC Champions League (present: AFC Champions League Elite)	Group F	(Vietnam)	Hoàng Anh Gia Lai	3–0	1–5
2004	AFC Champions League (present: AFC Champions League Elite)	Group F	(Thailand)	Krung Thai Bank	2–3	2–1
2004	AFC Champions League (present: AFC Champions League Elite)	Group F	(China)	Dalian Shide	0–1	1–2
2005	AFC Champions League (present: AFC Champions League Elite)	Group F	(Thailand)	BEC Tero Sasana	1–0	2–2
2005	AFC Champions League (present: AFC Champions League Elite)	Group F	(Japan)	Yokohama F. Marinos	0–2	0–3
2005	AFC Champions League (present: AFC Champions League Elite)	Group F	(China)	Shandong Luneng Taishan	0–1	1–6
2019	AFC Cup (present: AFC Champions League Two)	Group H	(Singapore)	Home United	3–2	1–1
2019	AFC Cup (present: AFC Champions League Two)	Group H	(Philippines)	Kaya–Iloilo	1–1	2–1
2019	AFC Cup (present: AFC Champions League Two)	Group H	(Laos)	Lao Toyota	7–3	3–0
2019	AFC Cup (present: AFC Champions League Two)	ASEAN Zone Semi-final	(Vietnam)	Becamex Bình Dương	2–1	0–1
2020	AFC Cup (present: AFC Champions League Two)	Play-off round	(Timor-Leste)	Lalenok United	3–1	4–1
2020	AFC Cup (present: AFC Champions League Two)	Group H	(Singapore)	Tampines Rovers	Cancelled	1–2
2020	AFC Cup (present: AFC Champions League Two)	Group H	(Myanmar)	Shan United	3–1	Cancelled
2020	AFC Cup (present: AFC Champions League Two)	Group H	(Philippines)	Kaya–Iloilo	1–1	Cancelled
2022	AFC Cup (present: AFC Champions League Two)	Group H	(Malaysia)	Kuala Lumpur City	0–0	
2022	AFC Cup (present: AFC Champions League Two)	Group H	(Singapore)	Tampines Rovers	3–1	
2022	AFC Cup (present: AFC Champions League Two)	ASEAN Zone Semi-final	(Malaysia)	Kedah Darul Aman	2–1	
2022	AFC Cup (present: AFC Champions League Two)	ASEAN Zone Final	(Malaysia)	Kuala Lumpur City	2–5	
2023–24	AFC Cup (present: AFC Champions League Two)	Play-off round	(Myanmar)	Yangon United	4–0	
2023–24	AFC Cup (present: AFC Champions League Two)	Group H	(Vietnam)	Hải Phòng	1–1	0–3
2023–24	AFC Cup (present: AFC Champions League Two)	Group H	(Malaysia)	Sabah	0–5	3–1
2023–24	AFC Cup (present: AFC Champions League Two)	Group H	(Singapore)	Hougang United	3–1	3–1

== Performance in AFF competitions ==
Season	Competition	Round	Nat	Club	Home	Away
2024–25	ASEAN Club Championship	Group A	(Thailand)	BG Pathum United	0–0	
2024–25	ASEAN Club Championship	Group A	(Myanmar)	Shan United	4–3	
2024–25	ASEAN Club Championship	Group A	(Cambodia)	Preah Khan Reach Svay Rieng		1–0
2024–25	ASEAN Club Championship	Group A	(Malaysia)	Terengganu		0–1
2024–25	ASEAN Club Championship	Group A	(Vietnam)	Đông Á Thanh Hóa	3–0	
2024–25	ASEAN Club Championship	Semi-finals	(Vietnam)	Công An Hà Nội	1–0	0–2

== See also ==
- List of football clubs in Indonesia
