= Persijap Jepara =

Association football team in Indonesia

- Full name: Persatuan Sepakbola Indonesia Jepara
- Nicknames: Laskar Kalinyamat (Kalinyamat Warriors); Elang Laut Jawa (Javasea Eagles)
- Short name: JAP
- Founded: 11 April 1954; 72 years ago
- Ground: Gelora Bumi Kartini Stadium
- Capacity: 8,500
- Owner(s): PT Jepara Raya Multitama; PT Oasis Waters International
- CEO: Iqbal Hidayat
- Head coach: Juan Cortés
- League: Super League
- 2025–26: Super League, 13th of 18
- Website: www.persijap.or.id
Home colours	Away colours	Third colours

Persatuan Sepakbola Indonesia Jepara, also known as Persijap, is an Indonesian professional football club based in Jepara, Central Java. They are currently competing in the Super League from the 2025–26 season, the top tier of Indonesian football, after gaining promotion from Championship (formerly Liga 2) at the end of the 2024–25 campaign. Their nickname is Laskar Kalinyamat (Kalinyamat Warriors) and Elang Laut Jawa (Java Sea Eagles).

== History ==
=== Foundation and early years (1954–1994) ===
Persijap was founded on 11 April 1954. Syahlan Ridwan, Jepara's Regent, founded the club. They have contributed players to the Indonesia national football team since 1979 when Haryanto was the first choice goalkeeper of the national team. Other national team players such as Siswandi Gancis, Solekan and Warsidi was from Persijap. They managed to win the Soeratin Cup in 1982.

=== Modern era and recent history (1994–present) ===
Their recent achievements in Indonesian football was only their promotion to the Liga Indonesia Premier Division in 2000 and 2004 with coach Rudi William Keltjes. In the youth teams, they managed to add Soeratin Cup titles in 1998 and 2002.

In 2007, they were also promoted to the newly formed Indonesia Super League. They were included in the Indonesia Premier League, before returning to the Super League in September 2012.

In August 2014, they were relegated to the Liga Indonesia Premier Division.

On 25 February 2025, Persijap secured promotion to Liga 1 by winning against PSPS Pekanbaru in promotion play-off with a narrow 1–0 win, with a goal from Léo Lelis in 84th minute and return to top tier after 11 years absence.

== Crest ==
First Crest

Second Crest until 2006

2008–current

== Kit suppliers ==
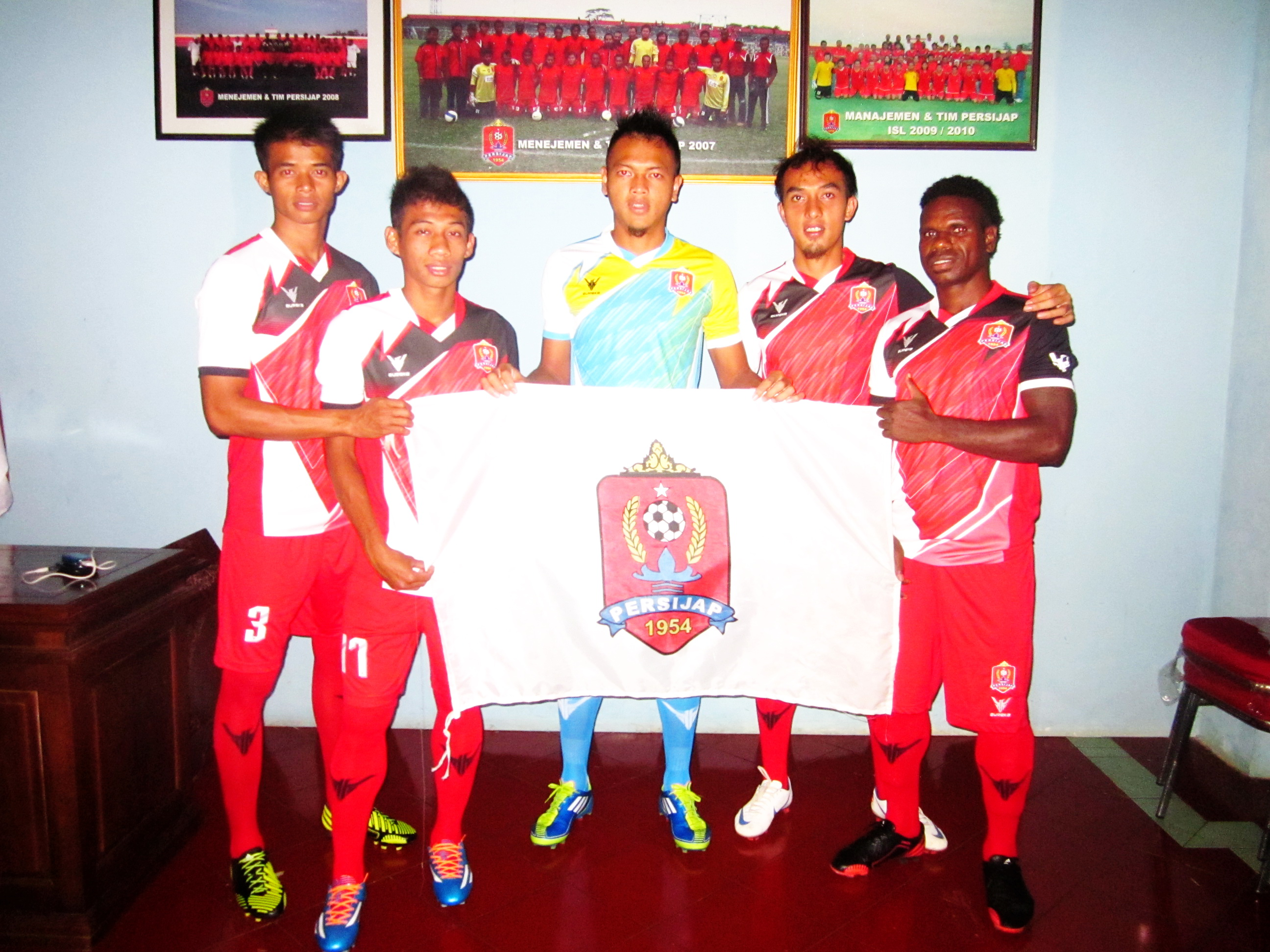
Persijap Jepara used Eureka in season 2014

- (Indonesia) Villour Sport (2006–2009)
- (Italy) Diadora (2009–2010)
- (Italy) Lotto (2010–2011)
- (England) Mitre (2011–2012)
- (Indonesia) Red Warriors (2013)
- (Thailand) Eureka Sports (2014)
- (Thailand) Kool (2015)
- (Indonesia) Calsei (2016)
- (Indonesia) MBB (2017)
- (Malaysia) Al-Ikhsan (2018)
- (Malaysia) Kaki Jersi (2019)
- (Indonesia) Trops (2020)
- (Indonesia) Degree (2021)
- (Indonesia) Made by club (2022)
- (Indonesia) Etams (2023)
- (Indonesia) Ad hoc Apparel (2024)
- (Indonesia) antfarm (2025/present)

== Stadium ==
Before 2008, Persijap played the home matches at the Kamal Djunaedi Stadium. Persijap now plays their home matches at the Gelora Bumi Kartini Stadium.

== Supporters ==
Persijap Jepara's supporter groups are Jetmania (Jepara Tifosi Mania), BANASPATI (Barisan Supporter Persijap Sejati), and CURVANORDSYNDICATE.

== Players ==
=== Current squad ===
As of October 2026

Note: Flags indicate national team as defined under FIFA eligibility rules; some limited exceptions apply. Players may hold more than one non-FIFA nationality.

No.	Pos.	Nation	Player
1	GK	IDN	Rajiv Abizal
3	DF	TJK	Rakhmatsho Rakhmatzoda
4	DF	ESP	Tiri (captain)
8	MF	CRC	Paulo Santamaría
9	FW	BRA	Juan Douglas
10	MF	ESP	Pirulo (vice-captain)
11	FW	IDN	Bil’asqan Hi Tenang
14	DF	IDN	Rahmat Hidayat
15	DF	GHA	Samuel Ofori (3rd captain)
16	MF	IDN	Tegar Infantrie
17	FW	CIV	Yaya Sogodogo
18	MF	IDN	Felix Marcelino
20	GK	IDN	Sendri Johansah
21	FW	IDN	Rendi Saepul
22	DF	IDN	Buyung Ismu Lessy
25	FW	BRA	China
26	GK	IDN	Rakasurya Handika (on loan from Borneo Samarinda)
27	FW	IDN	Reycredo Beremanda

No.	Pos.	Nation	Player
30	MF	IDN	Rendy Juliansyah
32	DF	IDN	Claudio Oliveira
37	DF	IDN	Raihan Apriansyah
44	DF	ESP	Sergio Chica
45	DF	IDN	Dion Galeh
55	MF	NIG	Najeeb Yakubu
70	MF	MNE	Vasko Kalezić
71	MF	IDN	Adzikry Fadlillah (on loan from Persib Bandung)
81	MF	IDN	Joananda Adiguna
82	FW	IDN	Kelvin Prakoso
83	MF	IDN	Zidan Apriadi
84	DF	IDN	Rubben Lesmana
85	MF	IDN	Rivaldi Wuliyanto
96	MF	IDN	Ambrizal Umanailo
97	MF	IDN	Ahmad Wadil

== Coaching staff ==
Position	Name
Technical director	-
Head coach	(Spain) Juan Cortés
Assistant coach	(Indonesia) Danang Suryadi (Indonesia) Antônio Cláudio
Goalkeeper coach	(Indonesia) Ahmad Nurosadi
Physical coach	(Indonesia) Jatmiko Adjie Kusuma

== Season-by-season records ==
Season(s)	League/Division	Tms.	Pos.	Piala Indonesia	I-League Cup	AFC competition(s)		ASEAN Club Championship
1994–95	First Division	24	3rd, Group 3	–	–	–	–	–
1995–96	First Division	24	Second round	–	–	–	–	–
1996–97	First Division	19	3rd, Group 3	–	–	–	–	–
1997–98	First Division	season abandoned		–	–	–	–	–
1998–99	First Division	19	3rd, Group 2	–	–	–	–	–
1999–2000	First Division	21	4	–	–	–	–	–
2001	Premier Division	28	12th, East Region	–	–	–	–	–
2002	First Division	27	Second round	–	–	–	–	–
2003	First Division	26	8	–	–	–	–	–
2004	First Division	24	Second round	–	–	–	–	–
2005	Premier Division	28	12th, East Division	Round of 16	–	–	–	–
2006	Premier Division	28	9th, West Division	First round	–	–	–	–
2007–08	Premier Division	36	9th, East Division	Quarter-finals	–	–	–	–
2008–09	Indonesia Super League	18	11	Semi-finals	–	–	–	–
2009–10	Indonesia Super League	18	9	First round	–	–	–	–
2010–11	Indonesia Super League	15	14	–	–	–	–	–
2011–12	Indonesian Premier League	12	10	Second round	–	–	–	–
2013	Indonesian Premier League	16	season unfinished	–	–	–	–	–
2014	Indonesia Super League	22	11th, West Region	–	–	–	–	–
2015	Premier Division	55	did not finish	–	–	–	–	–
2016	Indonesia Soccer Championship B	53	3rd, Group 4	–	–	–	–	–
2017	Liga 2	61	7th, Group 3	–	–	–	–	–
2018	Liga 3	32	Second round	Second round	–	–	–	–
2019	Liga 3	32	1	Second round	–	–	–	–
2020	Liga 2	24	did not finish	–	–	–	–	–
2021–22	Liga 2	24	4th, Group C	–	–	–	–	–
2022–23	Liga 2	28	did not finish	–	–	–	–	–
2023–24	Liga 2	28	1st, Relegation round	–	–	–	–	–
2024–25	Liga 2	26	3	–	–	–	–	–
2025–26	Super League	18	13	–	–	–	–	–
2026–27	Super League	18	TBD	–	TBD	–	–	–

== Honours ==
- Liga 2
  - Promotion play-off winner: 2024–25
- Liga 3
  - Champions (1): 2019
- Soeratin Cup
  - Champions (3): 1982, 1998, 2002
- Megawati Cup
  - Champions (1): 2004

== See also ==
- List of football clubs in Indonesia
