= Luka Čumić =

Serbian footballer (born 2001)

Personal information
- Date of birth: 25 May 2001 (age 25)
- Place of birth: Belgrade, FR Yugoslavia
- Height: 1.90 m (6 ft 3 in)
- Position: Forward

Team information
- Current team: PSM Makassar
- Number: 9

Youth career
- –2017: Vrčin
- 2017–2018: Rad

Senior career*
Years	Team	Apps	(Gls)
2019–2020	Metalac Gornji Milanovac	6	(1)
2020–2021	Rabotnicki	12	(1)
2021	Novi Pazar	2	(0)
2021–2023	Zlatibor Čajetina	71	(18)
2023–2024	Radnik Surdulica	37	(0)
2024–2025	Trayal Kruševac	34	(12)
2025–2026	Radnik Bijeljina	18	(4)
2026–	PSM Makassar	18	(5)
- * Club domestic league appearances and goals as of 6 September 2026

Luka Čumić (Serbian Cyrillic: Лука Чумић; born 25 May 2001) is a Serbian professional footballer who plays as a forward for Super League club PSM Makassar.

== Club career ==
Born in Belgrade, Čumić began his career at Vrčin and Rad at youth level. Then, he played for Serbian First League club Metalac Gornji Milanovac in 2019 season. And in 2020 season, he decided to go abroad for the first time to the North Macedonia and joined Macedonian First Football League side Rabotnicki. On 23 August 2020, he made his debut as a substitute in a 0–0 draw over Pelister in the 2020–21 Macedonian First Football League.

Čumić subsequently return to Serbia, joined Serbian SuperLiga club Novi Pazar, and Zlatibor Čajetina, before signed two half-years contract with Serbian First League club Radnik Surdulica in June 2023. On 21 August 2024, Čumić signed for another Serbian SuperLiga club, Trayal Kruševac through a fee transfer. During his one season with Trayal Kruševac, he scored 12 goals and had 7 assists in 34 league games.

In June 2025, he moved abroad and joined Radnik Bijeljina in Bosnia and Herzegovina. On 27 July 2025, he scored his first league goal in his debut match against Željezničar Sarajevo, opening the scoring in a draw 1–1.

=== PSM Makassar ===
On 25 January 2026, Čumić officially completed a transfer to Indonesian Super League club PSM Makassar in the second half of the 2025–26 season, marking his first venture into Asian football following his extensive career in Serbia, North Macedonia, and Bosnia and Herzegovina. He made his debut for the Juku Eja on 2 February 2026, coming on as a substituted in a 0–0 draw against Semen Padang. On 10 April 2026, he scored his first league goal for PSM Makassar against PSIM Yogyakarta, scored the equalizing in a 1–2 victory at Sultan Agung Stadium. He added his second goals of the season on 23 April with one goal against Persik Kediri in a 3–1 home win.
