= Stefan Jevtoski =

Macedonian footballer

Personal information
- Date of birth: 2 September 1997 (age 29)
- Place of birth: Skopje, Macedonia
- Height: 1.77 m (5 ft 10 in)
- Position: Defensive midfielder

Team information
- Current team: PSM Makassar
- Number: 8

Youth career
- Metalurg Skopje

Senior career*
Years	Team	Apps	(Gls)
2014–2016	Metalurg Skopje	27	(0)
2016–2017	Lokomotiv Plovdiv	19	(1)
2017–2018	Varaždin	12	(0)
2018–2019	Arsenal Kyiv	11	(0)
2019–2021	Rabotnički	41	(4)
2021–2024	Újpest	12	(0)
2024–2026	Struga	54	(6)
2026–	PSM Makassar	5	(3)

International career
2012–2013	Macedonia U17	3	(1)
2013–2015	Macedonia U19	12	(2)
2017–2018	Macedonia U21	5	(0)
- * Club domestic league appearances and goals as of 16 October 2026

Stefan Jevtoski (Macedonian: Стефан Јевтоски; born 2 September 1997) is a Macedonian footballer who plays as a midfielder for Super League club PSM Makassar.

== Career ==
In January 2016, Jevtoski signed a three-year contract with Bulgarian club Lokomotiv Plovdiv. He made his competitive debut on 29 November against Montana in which he came on in the 81st minute for Dani Kiki. His first goal came on 12 May 2017 against Levski Sofia when he joined from the bench in the 54th minute and scored the final goal for the 2–1 win. On 15 August 2017, Jevtoski's contract was terminated by mutual consent. He currently plays for NK Varazdin in the Croatian second league and made his debut against NK Lucko in 1:0 win. In July 2018, Jevtoski moved to Arsenal Kyiv on a free transfer. He made his league debut for the club on 29 July 2018, playing all 90 minutes in a 3–0 away defeat to Shakhtar Donetsk.

== International career ==
=== Youth levels ===
Jevtoski made his debut for Macedonia U21 on 28 March 2017 in a friendly match against Bulgaria U21.

== Statistics ==
=== Club ===
As of 1 June 2017

Club performance			League		Cup		Continental		Other		Total	
Club	League	Season	Apps	Goals	Apps	Goals	Apps	Goals	Apps	Goals	Apps	Goals
Macedonia			League		Macedonia Cup		Europe		Other		Total	
Metalurg Skopje	Prva Liga	2014–15	14	0	0	0	0	0	–		14	0
Metalurg Skopje	Prva Liga	2015–16	13	0	0	0	–		–		13	0
Metalurg Skopje	Total		27	0	0	0	0	0	0	0	27	0
Bulgaria			League		Bulgarian Cup		Europe		Other (Note: Includes Bulgarian Supercup matches.)		Total	
Lokomotiv Plovdiv	A Group	2015–16	0	0	0	0	0	0	—		0	0
Lokomotiv Plovdiv	Parva Liga	2016–17	17	1	2	0	—		—		19	1
Lokomotiv Plovdiv	Total		17	1	2	0	0	0	0	0	19	1
Career statistics			44	1	2	0	0	0	0	0	46	1
