= Darije Kalezić =

Swiss football coach and former football player (born 1969)

Personal information
- Date of birth: 1 November 1969 (age 57)
- Place of birth: Pfäffikon, Switzerland
- Height: 1.85 m (6 ft 1 in)
- Position: Defender

Team information
- Current team: PSM Makassar (head coach)

Youth career
- 1982–1985: Mladost Doboj Kakanj
- 1985–1991: Lokomotiva Mostar

Senior career*
Years	Team	Apps	(Gls)
1991–1992	Velež Mostar	15	(1)
1992–1994	Neretva	24	(3)
1994–1995	Den Bosch	22	(0)
1995–2002	RKC Waalwijk	120	(5)
2002–2003	Velež Mostar	32	(1)
2003–2004	AGOVV	32	(2)
2004–2006	De Graafschap	25	(2)
Total		270	(14)

Managerial career
- 2009–2011: De Graafschap
- 2011: Zulte Waregem
- 2013: Stockport County
- 2013–2015: Jong PSV
- 2015–2016: Roda JC
- 2016: Al-Taawoun
- 2017–2018: Wellington Phoenix
- 2019: PSM Makassar
- 2020–2021: MVV Maastricht
- 2021–2023: Jong FC Utrecht
- 2023–2025: ADO Den Haag
- 2025: TSC
- 2026–: PSM Makassar
- * Club domestic league appearances and goals

Darije Kalezić (born 1 November 1969) is a Swiss professional football manager and former player. He is currently the head coach of the Indonesia Super League club, PSM Makassar.

== Personal life ==
Kalezić's father is from Montenegro and his mother is from Sanski Most, Bosnia and Herzegovina. His parents were guest workers in Switzerland when he was born, but they moved back to the Balkans, settling in Mostar when Darije was a child.

== Playing career ==
Kalezić was born in Pfäffikon, Switzerland. He started his career still in Yugoslavia, then Bosnia and Herzegovina, where he played for 4th tier FK Lokomotiva Mostar when sports director Vahid Halilhodžić brought him to Velež Mostar. When the Bosnian War broke out, he left Mostar and earned a contract with Croatian side NK Neretva and played for them during the Croatian War of Independence. He fled war-torn Croatia for the Netherlands in 1994 and as player being member of FC Den Bosch, RKC Waalwijk, AGOVV Apeldoorn, and De Graafschap. He retired in 2006, at De Graafschap.

== Managerial career ==
After his retirement from football as a player, Kalezić accepted to stay at De Graafschap as a reserve/youth team coach from 2006 to 2008, and later on being promoted as assistant coach.

=== De Graafschap ===
On 25 February 2009, he was appointed interim manager of De Graafschap after previous manager Henk van Stee was dismissed due to poor results. Even though the team relegated at the end of the season, Kalezić was confirmed as head coach for the new season, in which he led the promptly bounce back into the Eredivisie by claiming the 2009–10 Eerste Divisie title. He saved the team from relegation in 2010–11, leaving the club at the end of the season.

=== Zulte Waregem ===
In June 2011, Kalezić was announced as new head coach of Belgian Pro League club Zulte Waregem. On 27 December 2011, Kalezić was fired with Zulte Waregem in 14th place and two places above relegation.

=== Stockport County ===
On 24 January 2013, Kalezić was announced as manager of Stockport County. Kalezić held this position until 20 March 2013 at which point he left the club via mutual consent.

=== Jong PSV ===
Ahead of the 2013–14 season, Kalezić was appointed manager of Jong PSV, the reserve side of PSV Eindhoven, for their first season in the Eerste Divisie. Jong PSV finished the 2013–14 Eerste Divisie in 10th place. Kalezić guided the Jong PSV to a 14th-place finish in the 2014/15 Eerste Divisie.

=== Roda JC ===
On 11 June 2015, Kalezić was appointed manager of newly promoted Roda JC on a two-year contract. Roda JC finished 14th, 5 points above relegation, on their return to the Eredivisie. Kalezić was sacked on 10 May 2016 after making critical comments against the club's technical director, Ton Caanen.

=== Al-Taawoun ===
On 2 June 2016, Kalezić was appointed as manager of Saudi club Al-Taawoun. Kalezić was sacked on 15 October 2016 after five league games in charge.

=== Wellington Phoenix ===
On 7 June 2017, Kalezić was announced as manager of A-League club Wellington Phoenix. On 1 March 2018, Wellington Phoenix announced that Kalezić would be departing the club at the end of the season after they were not able to come to an agreement on how the club proceeds forward for the next season. A further announcement on 8 March 2018 confirmed he was leaving the club.

=== PSM Makassar ===
In January 2019, Kalezić was appointed head coach of Indonesian Liga 1 club PSM Makassar. During his first spell at the club, he led PSM to victory in the 2018–19 Indonesian Cup, defeating Persija Jakarta in the final. This was PSM Makassar's first major domestic trophy in many years. Kalezić left the club at the end of 2019 before continuing his managerial career in Maastricht (the Netherlands).

=== MVV Maastricht ===
In June 2020, Kalezić was appointed new head coach of Dutch Eerste Divisie club MVV Maastricht. He signed a two-year contract. Kalezić has ensured the reconstruction of MVV Maastricht.

=== Jong FC Utrecht ===
On 28 May 2021, Kalezić was appointed new head coach of Dutch Eerste Divisie club Jong FC Utrecht. He signed a three-year contract. Kalezić left Jong FC Utrecht in June 2023.

=== ADO Den Haag ===
On 29 June 2023, Kalezić was appointed as new head coach of Dutch Eerste Divisie club ADO Den Haag. He signed a two-year contract. After his contract expired, Darije left the club in 2025.

=== TSC ===
On 16 June 2025, Kalezić was appointed as the new head coach of Serbian club TSC. He signed a two-year contract. On 2 November 2025 Kalezić left the club.

=== PSM Makassar ===
On 10 June 2026, Kalezić was reappointed as head coach of Indonesian Super League club PSM Makassar ahead of the 2026–27 season. He returned to the club after previously managing them in 2019, when he won the Indonesian Cup. On 19 July 2026, PSM Makassar officially introduced Kalezić as their new head coach and announced that he had signed a three-year contract. He returned with the aim of rebuilding the team and restoring its competitiveness in Indonesian football.

== Managerial statistics ==
As of match played 7 November 2026

Managerial record by team and tenure
Team	Nat.	From	To	Record					Ref.
Team	Nat.	From	To	G	W	D	L	Win %	Ref.
De Graafschap	(Netherlands)	25 February 2009	30 June 2011	92	42	23	27	45.65	
Zulte Waregem	(Belgium)	25 May 2011	27 December 2011	21	3	9	9	14.29	
Stockport County	(England)	24 January 2013	19 March 2013	12	3	2	7	25.00	
Jong PSV	(Netherlands)	1 July 2013	30 June 2015	79	27	22	30	34.18	
Roda JC Kerkrade	(Netherlands)	1 July 2015	30 June 2016	38	11	10	17	28.95	
Al-Taawoun	(Saudi Arabia)	1 July 2016	15 October 2016	7	2	1	4	28.57	
Wellington Phoenix	(New Zealand)	7 June 2017	8 March 2018	21	4	5	12	19.05	
PSM Makassar	(Indonesia)	2 February 2019	16 December 2019	53	24	7	22	45.28	
MVV Maastricht	(Netherlands)	1 July 2020	30 June 2021	39	13	7	19	33.33	
Jong FC Utrecht	(Netherlands)	1 July 2021	30 June 2023	75	18	12	45	24.00	
ADO Den Haag	(Netherlands)	1 July 2023	30 June 2025	87	41	23	23	47.13	
FK TSC	(Serbia)	1 July 2025	4 November 2025	15	4	3	8	26.67	
PSM Makassar	(Indonesia)	10 June 2026	Present	10	3	4	3	30.00	
Career Total				549	195	128	226	35.52	

== Honours ==
=== Player ===
Neretva

- Croatian Second League: 1993–94 (South)

=== Manager ===
De Graafschap

- Eerste Divisie: 2009–10

PSM Makassar

- Piala Indonesia: 2018–19

Individual

- Eerste Divisie Manager of the year: 2009–10
