= 2025–26 Super League (Indonesia) =

16th season of top division league in Indonesia

Super League
- Season: 2025–26
- Dates: 8 August 2025 – 23 May 2026
- Champions: Persib; 4th Super League title 10th Indonesian title
- Relegated: PSBS; Semen Padang; Persis
- AFC Champions League Two: Persib
- AFC Challenge League: Borneo Samarinda
- ASEAN Championship: Persib; Borneo Samarinda
- Matches: 306
- Goals: 855 (2.79 per match)
- Top goalscorer: David da Silva (23 goals)
- Biggest home win: Bhayangkara Presisi 7–0 PSBS (23 May 2026)
- Biggest away win: PSBS 0–7 Malut United (28 April 2026); Semen Padang 0–7 Persebaya (15 May 2026)
- Highest scoring: Malut United 6–2 PSBS (4 January 2026); Borneo Samarinda 7–1 Malut United (23 May 2026)
- Longest winning run: 11 matches Borneo Samarinda
- Longest unbeaten run: 21 matches Persib
- Longest winless run: 17 matches PSBS
- Longest losing run: 12 matches PSBS
- Highest attendance: 56,989; Persija 0–2 Arema (8 February 2026)
- Lowest attendance: 94; PSBS 1–2 Persik (29 August 2025) (excluding matches played behind closed doors)
- Total attendance: 1,949,901
- Average attendance: 6,372

The 2025–26 Super League (also known as the 2025–26 BRI Super League for sponsorship reasons) was the inaugural season of the Super League under its current name and the 16th season of the top-flight Indonesian football league since its establishment in 2008. The season began on 8 August 2025 and concluded on 23 May 2026, which included a break from 1 to 19 December 2025 in conjunction with the SEA Games in Thailand. The summer transfer window ran from 24 June to 11 September 2025, while the winter transfer window ran from 2 January to 28 February 2026.

Persib were the defending champions after winning their 3rd Liga 1 title and 9th overall Indonesian top-flight football title in the previous season.

== Overview ==
The league was contested by 18 teams. This was made up of fifteen teams from the previous season and three teams promoted from Liga 2.

Three teams were relegated at the end of the previous season. PSIS were the first to be relegated on 11 May 2025 after Semen Padang had a draw with Persebaya in an away match during matchweek 32. The result ended PSIS's seven-season stay in the first-tier. The other two teams to be relegated were PSS and Barito Putera with the results of each match in final matchweek. Despite winning over Madura United, PSS were relegated after six seasons in the top tier. Barito Putera's win over PSIS on the final day did not keep them in the division, for the first time in 12 years.

Three teams were promoted from Liga 2. Bhayangkara Presisi secured promotion following a win over Persijap in matchweek 5 of Group Y in the championship round. PSIM were promoted following a win over PSPS in matchweek 6 of Group X in the championship round. This season marked PSIM's return to the top tier after 18 years. Persijap won the divisional promotion play-off in a game against PSPS. This marked Persijap's return to the top tier after 10 seasons of absence, including two seasons in the third tier.

Starting from this season, I-League announced an increase in the foreign player quota to a maximum of 11 per club. However, only nine foreign players are allowed to be registered in the matchday squad, with a maximum of seven in the starting eleven and two on the bench.

== Teams ==
=== Changes ===
The following teams changed division since the 2024–25 season.

▲ Promoted from Liga 2	▼ Relegated to Championship
PSIM; Bhayangkara Presisi; Persijap	PSS; Barito Putera; PSIS

=== Teams by province ===
Number	Province	Team(s)
4	East Java	Arema, Madura United, Persebaya, and Persik
2	Banten	Dewa United and Persita
2	Central Java	Persijap and Persis
1	Bali	Bali United
1	East Kalimantan	Borneo Samarinda
1	Jakarta	Persija
1	Lampung	Bhayangkara
1	North Maluku	Malut United
1	Papua	PSBS
1	South Sulawesi	PSM
1	Special Region of Yogyakarta	PSIM
1	West Java	Persib
1	West Sumatra	Semen Padang

=== Locations and stadiums ===
Locations of teams in the 2025–26 Super League
Locations of teams in the 2025–26 Super League from Java Island

Team	Location	Stadium	Capacity	2024–25 season
Arema	Malang	Kanjuruhan	21,603	10th in Liga 1
Bali United	Gianyar	Kapten I Wayan Dipta	18,000	8th in Liga 1
Bhayangkara Presisi^{↑}	Bandar Lampung	Sumpah Pemuda	7,159	2nd in Liga 2
Borneo Samarinda	Samarinda	Segiri	13,000	5th in Liga 1
Dewa United Banten	Serang	Banten International	30,000	2nd in Liga 1
Dewa United Banten	Serang	Indomilk Arena, at Tangerang	15,000	2nd in Liga 1
Madura United	Pamekasan	Gelora Ratu Pamelingan	7,000	15th in Liga 1
Malut United	Ternate	Gelora Kie Raha	15,000	3rd in Liga 1
Persebaya	Surabaya	Gelora Bung Tomo	46,806	4th in Liga 1
Persib	Bandung	Gelora Bandung Lautan Api	38,000	1st in Liga 1
Persija	Jakarta	Jakarta International	82,000	7th in Liga 1
Persija	Jakarta	Gelora Bung Karno	77,200	7th in Liga 1
Persija	Jakarta	Patriot Candrabhaga, at Bekasi City	30,000	7th in Liga 1
Persijap^{↑}	Jepara	Gelora Bumi Kartini	8,570	3rd in Liga 2
Persik	Kediri	Brawijaya	10,000	12th in Liga 1
Persik	Kediri	Gelora Joko Samudro, at Gresik	25,000	12th in Liga 1
Persis	Surakarta	Manahan	20,000	14th in Liga 1
Persita	Tangerang	Indomilk Arena	15,000	11th in Liga 1
Persita	Tangerang	Banten International, at Serang (Note: Persita played their final four home games of the season at Banten International Stadium in Serang due to Indomilk Arena suffering hurricane damage on March 30.)	30,000	11th in Liga 1
PSBS	Biak Numfor	Maguwoharjo, at Sleman (Note: Due to the lack of available stadiums in Biak Numfor, PSBS played their home matches at Maguwoharjo Stadium in Sleman.)	20,594	9th in Liga 1
PSIM^{↑}	Yogyakarta	Sultan Agung, at Bantul (Note: Due to Mandala Krida Stadium not meeting the league requirements, PSIM played their home matches at Sultan Agung Stadium in Bantul.)	30,000	1st in Liga 2
PSM	Makassar	Gelora B.J. Habibie, at Parepare (Note: Due to the lack of available stadiums in Makassar, PSM played their home matches at the Gelora B.J. Habibie Stadium in Parepare.)	8,500	6th in Liga 1
Semen Padang	Padang	Gelora Haji Agus Salim	11,000	13th in Liga 1

^{↑}	Promoted from the Liga 2

=== Personnel and kits ===
Note: Flags indicate national team as has been defined under FIFA eligibility rules. Players and coaches may hold more than one non-FIFA nationality.

Team	Head coach	Captain	Kit manufacturer	Kit sponsors	
Team	Head coach	Captain	Kit manufacturer	Main	Other(s)
Arema	(Brazil national football team) Marquinhos Santos	(Indonesia national football team) Johan Alfarizi	(Indonesia) Etams	balé by BTN	List: Front: None; Back: None; Sleeves: TCT; Shorts: None
Bali United	(Netherlands national football team) Johnny Jansen	(Indonesia national football team) Ricky Fajrin	(Indonesia) SPECS	Indofood	List: Front: Mandiri Services, Mandiri Contractor, Gojek, Trima+, Oppo, Mandiri Coal, Salonpas Let’s Move, Honda, Alderon; Back: CBN Fiber, Indomie, Riung; Sleeves: YCAB Foundation, Mandiri Tranship; Shorts: None
Bhayangkara Presisi	(Northern Ireland national football team) Paul Munster	(Indonesia national football team) Awan Setho Raharjo	(Indonesia) Etams	JungleSea	List: Front: None; Back: Bakrieland; Sleeves: Mitra Orphys, Gojek, Jasa Raharja; Shorts: None
Borneo Samarinda	(Brazil national football team) Fábio Lefundes	(Indonesia national football team) Nadeo Argawinata	(Indonesia) SPECS	Pupuk Kaltim^{3}	List: Front: None; Back: Extra Joss; Sleeves: None; Shorts: None
Dewa United Banten	(Netherlands national football team) Jan Olde Riekerink	(Indonesia national football team) Ricky Kambuaya	(Indonesia) DRX	BAIC Indonesia	List: Front: Cow Play Cow Moo; Back: Carstensz Residence and Mall BSD, Le Minerale; Sleeves: JHL Solitaire; Shorts: None
Madura United	(Indonesia national football team) Rakhmat Basuki (caretaker)	(Brazil national football team) Lulinha	(Indonesia) XTen	Weha Group	List: Front: POJUR, Oxygen.id, Titan Infra Energy, SOMA; Back: Trans Utama Kargo; Sleeves: None; Shorts: None
Malut United	(Indonesia national football team) Hendri Susilo	(Indonesia national football team) Safrudin Tahar	(Indonesia) SPECS	Lumbung Ikan Maluku	List: Front: BPR Global Nusantara; Back: None; Sleeves: None; Shorts: None
Persebaya	(Portugal national football team) Bernardo Tavares	(Brazil national football team) Bruno Moreira	(Indonesia) AZA^{2}	Kapal Api	List: Front: Extra Joss, Indomie, Antangin; Back: Citicon, MPM Honda Distributor; Sleeves: Kencana Baja Ringan; Shorts: None
Persib	(Croatia national football team) Bojan Hodak	(Indonesia national football team) Marc Klok	(Spain) Kelme	Indofood / Indomie (ACL2)	List: Front: balé by BTN, Se'Indonesia^{4}, Le Minerale, Greenfields, Teh Pucuk Harum, Vivo; Back: Kopi ABC, Combiphar; Sleeves: Indomie; Shorts: None
Persija	(Brazil national football team) Maurício Souza	(Indonesia national football team) Rizky Ridho	(Indonesia) Juaraga	Bank Jakarta	List: Front: Se'Indonesia, PAM Jaya, Bakrie Untuk Negeri, Indomie, Amman Mineral; Back: Hyundai, Le Minerale; Sleeves: Netzme; Shorts: TCT
Persijap	(Portugal national football team) Mário Lemos	(Indonesia national football team) Wahyudi Hamisi	(Indonesia) Antfarm	Oasis Waters	List: Front: Oasis Blu, Oasis+; Back: Honbun Bakery; Sleeves: Fork Bakery & Grill; Shorts: None
Persik	(Spain) Marcos Reina	(Indonesia national football team) Ezra Walian	(Indonesia) DRX	Athletes For Good	List: Front: WBI Foods; Back: Akeo Demineral; Sleeves: None; Shorts: None
Persis	(Bosnia and Herzegovina national football team) Milomir Šešlija	(Brazil national football team) Andrei Alba	(Indonesia) Made by club	Aladin Bank	List: Front: Call of Duty: Mobile; Back: None; Sleeves: Lotus Archi Gold; Shorts: None
Persita	(Spain national football team) Carlos Peña	(Indonesia national football team) Muhammad Toha	(Indonesia) 1953^{2}	Indomilk	List: Front: balé by BTN, Moya; Back: Aetra Tangerang, Matrix Broadband, Palang Merah Indonesia, KABOOM Creative; Sleeves: Indomie; Shorts: None
PSBS	(Romania national football team) Marian Mihail	(Portugal national football team) Sandro Sakho	(Indonesia) RMB Apparel	Bank Papua^{4}	List: Front: Ulam Laut^{5}; Back: SIMANJA^{5}; Sleeves: None; Shorts: None
PSIM	(Netherlands national football team) Jean-Paul van Gastel	(Argentina national football team) Franco Ramos Mingo	(Indonesia) Apex	Adem Sari	List: Front: Taro Snack, Rexona; Back: None; Sleeves: Le Minerale; Shorts: None
PSM	(Indonesia national football team) Ahmad Amiruddin (caretaker)	(Cape Verde national football team) Yuran Fernandes	(Germany) Adidas	Honda (H & A) / Bosowa Corp (3rd)	List: Front: balé by BTN (H & A) / None (3rd); Back: Salonpas Let's Move (H & A) / balé by BTN, Salonpas Let's Move (3rd); Sleeves: Astra Motor (H & A) / Honda, Astra Motor (3rd); Shorts: None
Semen Padang	(Indonesia national football team) Imran Nahumarury	(Portugal national football team) Ângelo Meneses	(Indonesia) SPFC Apparel^{2}	Semen Padang	List: Front: Pertamina, Tanikaya, Bank Nagari; Back: PLN, Bacarito Kopi, Vica Air Mineral, Bopet Kopi 701; Sleeves: Semen Padang; Shorts: None

1. Interim.
2. Apparel made by club.
3. Borneo advertised different products of Pupuk Kaltim on their kits, which include Pupuk NPK Pelangi (matchweek 1-3) and Nitrea (matchweek 4 onwards).
4. Persib were sponsored by Intersport and Pria Punya Selera in the first half of the season.
5. PSBS were without a sponsor until matchweek 9.

=== Coaching changes ===
==== Pre-season ====
Team	Outgoing head coach	Manner of departure	Date of vacancy	Replaced by	Date of appointment
PSIM	(Indonesia) Erwan Hendarwanto	Became assistant coach	1 March 2025	(Netherlands) Jean-Paul van Gastel	17 June 2025
Bhayangkara Presisi	(Indonesia) Hanim Sugiarto	End of contract	1 March 2025	(Northern Ireland) Paul Munster	19 June 2025
Persijap	(Indonesia) Widodo Cahyono Putro	End of contract	1 March 2025	(Portugal) Mário Lemos	9 June 2025
Bali United	(Indonesia) Stefano Cugurra	End of contract	18 April 2025	(Netherlands) Johnny Jansen	26 May 2025
Persija	(Spain) Carlos Peña	Mutual consent	1 May 2025	(Brazil) Maurício Souza	27 May 2025
Persita	(Brazil) Fábio Lefundes	End of contract	16 May 2025	(Spain) Carlos Peña	11 June 2025
Borneo Samarinda	(Spain) Joaquín Gómez	End of contract	25 May 2025	(Brazil) Fábio Lefundes	15 June 2025
Persebaya	(Northern Ireland) Paul Munster	End of contract	25 May 2025	(Spain) Eduardo Pérez Morán	3 June 2025
Persik	(Portugal) Divaldo Alves	End of contract	15 June 2025	(Malaysia) Ong Kim Swee	19 June 2025
Malut United	(Indonesia) Imran Nahumarury	Sacked	16 June 2025	(Indonesia) Hendri Susilo	24 July 2025
Persis	(Malaysia) Ong Kim Swee	Signed by Persik	19 June 2025	(Netherlands) Peter de Roo	27 June 2025
Arema	(Portugal) Zé Gomes	Mutual consent	24 June 2025	(Brazil) Marquinhos Santos	26 June 2025
PSBS	(Argentina) Marcos Guillermo Samso	End of contract	18 July 2025	(Portugal) Divaldo Alves	18 July 2025

==== During the season ====
Team	Outgoing head coach	Manner of departure	Date of vacancy	Week	Table	Replaced by	Date of appointment
PSM	(Portugal national football team) Bernardo Tavares	Resigned	1 October 2025	7	14th	(Czech Republic national football team) Tomáš Trucha	28 October 2025
Semen Padang	(Portugal national football team) Eduardo Almeida	Sacked	8 October 2025	7	18th	(Serbia national football team) Dejan Antonić	10 October 2025
Madura United	(Argentina national football team) Angel Alfredo Vera	Became technical director	10 November 2025	12	11th	(Brazil national football team) Carlos Eduardo Parreira	13 November 2025
Persijap	(Portugal national football team) Mário Lemos	Sacked	21 November 2025	12	16th	(Indonesia national football team) Danang Suryadi (caretaker)	22 November 2025
Persebaya	(Spain national football team) Eduardo Pérez Morán	Sacked	22 November 2025	12	8th	(Indonesia national football team) Uston Nawawi (caretaker)	26 November 2025
Persik	(Malaysia national football team) Ong Kim Swee	Resigned	27 November 2025	13	11th	(Spain national football team) Marcos Reina	4 December 2025
PSBS	(Portugal national football team) Divaldo Alves	Sacked	9 December 2025	12	16th	(Indonesia national football team) Kahudi Wahyu (caretaker)	9 December 2025
Persijap	(Indonesia national football team) Danang Suryadi	End of caretaker role	19 December 2025	14	17th	(Portugal national football team) Divaldo Alves	19 December 2025
Persebaya	(Indonesia national football team) Uston Nawawi	End of caretaker role	23 December 2025	14	9th	(Portugal national football team) Bernardo Tavares	23 December 2025
PSBS	(Indonesia national football team) Kahudi Wahyu	End of caretaker role	10 February 2026	20	15th	(Romania national football team) Marian Mihail	10 February 2026
Persijap	(Portugal national football team) Divaldo Alves	Moved to technical director	17 February 2026	21	17th	(Portugal national football team) Mário Lemos	17 February 2026
Semen Padang	(Serbia national football team) Dejan Antonić	Sacked	5 March 2026	24	17th	(Indonesia national football team) Imran Nahumarury	5 March 2026
Madura United	(Brazil national football team) Carlos Eduardo Parreira	Sacked	14 March 2026	24	17th	(Indonesia national football team) Rakhmat Basuki (caretaker)	14 March 2026
PSM	(Czech Republic national football team) Tomáš Trucha	Resigned	31 March 2026		14th	(Indonesia national football team) Ahmad Amiruddin (caretaker)	31 March 2026

=== Foreign players ===
Starting this season, I-League announced an increase in the foreign player quota to eleven foreign players. However, only nine foreign players are allowed to be included in the matchday squad for a single match, with seven foreign players on the field and two foreign players on the bench.

- Player names printed in **bold** indicate that the player was registered during the mid-season transfer window.
- Names of former players printed in italics are players who left the squad or departed the club in a given season, after the pre-season transfer window, or during the mid-season transfer window, and have played at least once.

Team	Player 1	Player 2	Player 3	Player 4	Player 5	Player 6	Player 7	Player 8	Player 9	Player 10	Player 11	Former player
Arema	(Brazil) Betinho	(Brazil) Dalberto	(Brazil) **Gabriel Silva**	(Brazil) **Gustavo França**	(Brazil) **Joel Vinícius**	(Brazil) Lucas Frigeri	(Brazil) Matheus Blade	(Brazil) **Pablo Oliveira**	(Brazil) Valdeci	(Brazil) **Walisson Maia**	(Colombia) Julián Guevara	(Argentina) Ian Puleio (Brazil) Luiz Gustavo (Brazil) Odivan Koerich (Brazil) Paulinho Moccelin (Brazil) Yann Motta
Bali United	(Australia) Brandon Wilson	(Brazil) João Ferrari	(Costa Rica) **Diego Campos**	(Japan) **Teppei Yachida**	(Luxembourg) Mirza Mustafić	(Montenegro) Boris Kopitović	(Netherlands) Jordy Bruijn	(Netherlands) Mike Hauptmeijer	(Netherlands) Thijmen Goppel	(Netherlands) Tim Receveur		
Bhayangkara Presisi	(Afghanistan) Fareed Sadat	(Brazil) **Alan Cardoso**	(Brazil) Léo Silva	(Brazil) Moisés Gaúcho	(Cameroon) **Privat Mbarga**	(Ivory Coast) **Bernard Doumbia**	(Japan) **Ryo Matsumura**	(Japan) **Sho Yamamoto**	(Mali) **Moussa Sidibé**	(Montenegro) Slavko Damjanović	(North Macedonia) Nehar Sadiki	(Argentina) Lautaro Belleggia (Cambodia) Andrés Nieto (Croatia) Christian Ilić (Croatia) Stjepan Plazonja (Haiti) Shanyder Borgelin (Montenegro) Dejan Račić
Borneo Samarinda	(Argentina) **Marcos Astina**	(Argentina) Mariano Peralta	(Brazil) Caxambu	(Brazil) **Cleylton**	(Brazil) **Kaio Nunes**	(Burundi) Christophe Nduwarugira	(Colombia) Juan Villa	(Japan) Kei Hirose	(Lebanon) Mohamad Baker El Housseini	(Spain) **Koldo Obieta**	(Syria) **Mouhamad Anez**	(Brazil) Douglas Coutinho (Brazil) Joel Vinícius (Brazil) Maicon (Colombia) Aldair Simanca
Dewa United Banten	(Argentina) Alexis Messidoro	(Brazil) Alex Martins	(Brazil) Jajá	(Brazil) Johnathan	(Brazil) **Vico**	(Jamaica) **Damion Lowe**	(Japan) **Kodai Tanaka**	(Japan) Taisei Marukawa	(Morocco) **Noah Sadaoui**	(Netherlands) Nick Kuipers	(Netherlands) Sonny Stevens	(Brazil) Cássio Scheid (Cameroon) Privat Mbarga
Madura United	(Bosnia and Herzegovina) Kerim Palić	(Brazil) **Emerson Souza**	(Brazil) Iran Júnior	(Brazil) **Júnior Brandão**	(Brazil) Lulinha	(Brazil) Mendonça	(Brazil) **Riquelme Sousa**	(Netherlands) Jasey Wehrmann	(Netherlands) Jordy Wehrmann	(Portugal) Pedro Monteiro	(Spain) Ruxi	(Guinea-Bissau) Balotelli (Ukraine) Valeriy Hryshyn
Malut United	(Armenia) Wbeymar Angulo	(Brazil) Alan Bernardon	(Brazil) Ciro Alves	(Brazil) David da Silva	(Brazil) Gustavo França	(Brazil) Igor Inocêncio	(Brazil) **Lucas Cardoso**	(Brazil) Nilson Júnior	(Spain) Tyronne del Pino			(Brazil) Vico (Spain) Chechu Meneses
Persebaya	(Brazil) Bruno Moreira	(Brazil) **Bruno Paraíba**	(Brazil) **Gustavo Fernandes**	(Brazil) **Jefferson**	(Brazil) Léo Lelis	(Mexico) Francisco Rivera	(Montenegro) Mihailo Perović	(Montenegro) Miloš Raičković	(North Macedonia) Risto Mitrevski	(Portugal) **Pedro Matos**	(Timor-Leste) Gali Freitas	(Brazil) Diego Maurício (North Macedonia) Dime Dimov (Serbia) Dejan Tumbas
Persib	(Argentina) Luciano Guaycochea	(Argentina) Patricio Matricardi	(Brazil) Berguinho	(Brazil) Júlio César	(Brazil) Ramon Tanque	(Brazil) Uilliam Barros	(France) Andrew Jung	(France) **Layvin Kurzawa**	(Iraq) Frans Putros	(Italy) Federico Barba	(Spain) **Sergio Castel**	(Brazil) Wiliam Marcílio (Wales) Adam Przybek
Persija	(Brazil) Allano	(Brazil) Bruno Tubarão	(Brazil) Carlos Eduardo	(Brazil) Fábio Calonego	(Brazil) Gustavo Almeida	(Brazil) **Jean Mota**	(Brazil) Maxwell	(Brazil) **Paulo Ricardo**	(Brazil) Sousa	(Brazil) Thales Lira	(Morocco) **Alaaeddine Ajaraie**	(Brazil) Alan Cardoso (Brazil) Gustavo França (Japan) Ryo Matsumura
Persijap	(Argentina) Alexis Gómez	(Brazil) Carlos França	(Brazil) **Lucas Morelatto**	(Burundi) Sudi Abdallah	(France) **Aly Ndom**	(Niger) Najeeb Yakubu	(Portugal) Diogo Brito	(Spain) **Borja Herrera**	(Spain) **Borja Martínez**	(Spain) **Iker Guarrotxena**	(Spain) **Tiri**	(Brazil) Douglas Cruz (Brazil) Rodrigo Moura (Brazil) Rosalvo (Ghana) Elvis Sakyi
Persik	(Brazil) Léo Navacchio	(Brazil) **Rodrigo Dias**	(Portugal) Kiko	(Portugal) Telmo Castanheira	(Spain) **Chechu Meneses**	(Spain) **Ernesto Gómez**	(Spain) Imanol García	(Spain) **Jon Toral**	(Spain) José Enrique	(Uruguay) **Adrián Luna**		(Brazil) Lucão (France) Sylvain Atieda (Portugal) Pedro Matos (Uzbekistan) Khurshidbek Mukhtorov (Venezuela) Williams Lugo
Persis	(Brazil) **Andrei Alba**	(Brazil) **Bruno Gomes**	(Brazil) **Dimitri**	(Brazil) **Jefferson Carioca**	(Croatia) **Luka Dumančić**	(Liberia) **Abu Kamara**	(Serbia) **Dejan Tumbas**	(Serbia) **Dušan Mijić**	(Serbia) **Miroslav Maričić**	(Serbia) **Vukašin Vraneš**	(Ukraine) **Roman Paparyha**	(Brazil) **Clayton** (Brazil) Cleylton (Croatia) Mateo Kocijan (Curaçao) Gervane Kastaneer (Republic of Ireland) Fuad Sule (Japan) Kodai Tanaka (Japan) Sho Yamamoto (Netherlands) Jordy Tutuarima (Netherlands) Xandro Schenk (Portugal) Adriano Castanheira (Singapore) Zulfahmi Arifin
Persita	(Brazil) Éber Bessa	(Brazil) Matheus Alves	(Equatorial Guinea) Pablo Ganet	(Kyrgyzstan) Tamirlan Kozubayev	(Montenegro) Dejan Račić	(Portugal) Igor Rodrigues	(Serbia) Aleksa Andrejić	(South Korea) Bae Sin-yeong	(Spain) **Ramón Bueno**	(Spain) Rayco Rodríguez	(Uzbekistan) Javlon Guseynov	
PSBS	(Angola) Kadú	(Brazil) Luquinhas	(Brazil) Pablo Andrade	(Colombia) Kevin Lopez	(Colombia) Ruyery Blanco	(Portugal) Eduardo Barbosa	(Portugal) Mohcine Nader	(Portugal) Sandro Sakho	(South Korea) Hwang Myung-hyun			
PSIM	(Argentina) Ezequiel Vidal	(Argentina) Franco Ramos Mingo	(England) Deri Corfe	(Japan) Yusaku Yamadera	(Netherlands) Anton Fase	(Netherlands) Donny Warmerdam	(Netherlands) **Jop van der Avert**	(Portugal) Zé Valente	(Slovenia) Nermin Haljeta	(Tajikistan) Rakhmatsho Rakhmatzoda		(Brazil) Rafinha
PSM	(Brazil) Alex Tanque	(Brazil) Aloísio Neto	(Brazil) Gledson Paixão	(Brazil) Sávio Roberto	(Brazil) Victor Luiz	(Cape Verde) Yuran Fernandes	(Republic of the Congo) Jacques Thémopelé	(Japan) Daisuke Sakai	(Montenegro) **Dušan Lagator**	(Serbia) **Luka Cumić**	(Tajikistan) **Sheriddin Boboev**	(Brazil) Lucas Dias (Liberia) Abu Kamara
Semen Padang	(Brazil) Arthur	(Brazil) **Diego Maurício**	(Brazil) **Maicon**	(Canada) **Kianz Froese**	(Colombia) **Jaime Giraldo**	(Republic of the Congo) **Ravy Tsouka**	(Ghana) Alhassan Wakaso	(Japan) **Kazaki Nakagawa**	(Mali) **Boubakary Diarra**	(Portugal) Ângelo Meneses	(Spain) **Guillermo Fernández**	(Brazil) Bruno Gomes (Portugal) Filipe Chaby (Portugal) Pedro Matos (Portugal) Rui Rampa (Saint Vincent and the Grenadines) Cornelius Stewart

=== Foreign players by confederation ===
Foreign players by confederation
AFC	Afghanistan (1), Australia (1), Iraq (1), Japan (9), Kyrgyzstan (1), South Korea (2), Lebanon (1), Syria (1), Tajikistan (2), Timor-Leste (1), Uzbekistan (1)
CAF	Angola (1), Burundi (2), Ghana (1), Equatorial Guinea (1), Cameroon (1), Congo (2), Liberia (1), Mali (1), Morocco (1), Niger (1), Ivory Coast (1), Cape Verde (1)
CONCACAF	Jamaica (1), Canada (1), Costa Rica (1), Mexico (1)
CONMEBOL	Argentina (8), Brazil (72), Colombia (5), Uruguay (1)
OFC	
UEFA	Armenia (1), Netherlands (11), Bosnia and Herzegovina (1), England (1), Italy (1), Croatia (1), Luxembourg (1), North Macedonia (2), Montenegro (6), Portugal (11), France (4), Serbia (6), Slovenia (1), Spain (16), Ukraine (1)

=== Players with dual nationality/heritage ===
- Player names in **bold** indicate players who were registered after the season began.
- Player names in italics indicate Indonesian players abroad who have obtained an Indonesian passport and citizenship, and are therefore considered local players.

Club	Player 1	Player 2	Player 3	Player 4	Player 5
Arema					
Bali United	(France) (Indonesia) Maouri Simon ^{2} ^{3}	(Netherlands) (Indonesia) Jens Raven^{2} ^{3}			
Bhayangkara Presisi	(Montenegro) (Indonesia) Ilija Spasojević^{1}	(South Korea) (Indonesia) Ji Da-bin^{2} ^{3}			
Borneo Samarinda	(Guinea) (Indonesia) Ousmane Maiket ^{2} ^{3}	(Netherlands) (Indonesia) Diego Michiels^{1} ^{2} ^{3}			
Dewa United Banten	(Liberia) (Indonesia) Altalariq Ballah ^{3}	(Netherlands) (Indonesia) **Ivar Jenner**^{1} ^{2} ^{3}	(Netherlands) (Indonesia) Rafael Struick^{1} ^{2} ^{3}	(Netherlands) (Indonesia) Stefano Lilipaly^{1} ^{2} ^{3}	
Madura United					
Malut United					
Persebaya					
Persib	(Netherlands) (Indonesia) **Dion Markx**^{2} ^{3}	(Netherlands) (Indonesia) Eliano Reijnders^{1} ^{3}	(Netherlands) (Indonesia) Marc Klok^{1} ^{2} ^{3}	(Netherlands) (Indonesia) Thom Haye^{1} ^{3}	
Persija	(United States) (Iran) (Indonesia) **Cyrus Margono**^{3}	(Netherlands) (Indonesia) **Mauro Zijlstra**^{1} ^{2} ^{3}	(Netherlands) (Indonesia) **Shayne Pattynama**^{1} ^{3}	(Spain) (Indonesia) Jordi Amat^{1} ^{3}	
Persijap	(Sierra Leone) (Indonesia) Prince Kallon ^{3}				
Persik	(Netherlands) (Indonesia) Ezra Walian^{1} ^{2} ^{3}	(United States) (Indonesia) Gavin Kwan^{1} ^{2} ^{3}			
Persis	(China) (Indonesia) Sutanto Tan^{2} ^{3}				
Persita	(England) (Indonesia) Jack Brown^{2} ^{3}	(Japan) (Indonesia) Ryuji Utomo^{1} ^{2} ^{3}			
PSBS	(England) (Indonesia) George Brown^{3}				
PSIM					
PSM	(Canada) (Indonesia) Victor Dethan^{1} ^{2} ^{3}				
Semen Padang	(Liberia) (Indonesia) Ronaldo Kwateh^{1} ^{2} ^{3}				

Notes:
^1 Played for the Indonesia national team
^2 Played for Indonesia's youth national teams (U-17, U-20, and U-23)
^3 Has Indonesian heritage

== Standings ==
Pos	Team	Pld	W	D	L	GF	GA	GD	Pts	Qualification or relegation
1	Persib (C)	34	24	7	3	59	22	+37	79 (Note: Head-to-head points: Persib 4, Borneo Samarinda 1.)	Qualification for the 2026–27 AFC Champions League Two play-offs and 2026–27 ASEAN Club Championship group stage
2	Borneo Samarinda	34	25	4	5	74	31	+43	79	Qualification for the 2026–27 AFC Challenge League and 2026–27 ASEAN Club Championship group stage
3	Persija	34	22	5	7	65	29	+36	71	
4	Persebaya	34	16	10	8	61	35	+26	58	
5	Bhayangkara Presisi	34	16	5	13	53	45	+8	53 (Note: Head-to-head points: Bhayangkara Presisi 9, Malut United 6, Dewa United Banten 3.)	
6	Malut United	34	15	8	11	68	53	+15	53	
7	Dewa United Banten	34	16	5	13	44	37	+7	53	
8	Bali United	34	14	9	11	57	48	+9	51	
9	Arema	34	13	9	12	53	47	+6	48	
10	Persita	34	13	6	15	38	37	+1	45 (Note: Head-to-head points: Persita 6, PSIM 0.)	
11	PSIM	34	11	12	11	43	44	−1	45	
12	Persik	34	11	6	17	42	61	−19	39	
13	Persijap	34	9	9	16	31	45	−14	36	
14	Madura United	34	9	8	17	37	54	−17	35	
15	PSM	34	8	10	16	39	49	−10	34 (Note: Head-to-head points: PSM 4, Persis 1)	
16	Persis (R)	34	8	10	16	39	59	−20	34	Relegation to the 2026–27 Championship
17	Semen Padang (R)	34	5	5	24	22	65	−43	20	Relegation to the 2026–27 Championship
18	PSBS (R)	34	4	6	24	31	95	−64	18	Relegation to the 2026–27 Championship

Source: Super League 2025–26
Rules for classification: 1) Points; 2) Head-to-head points; 3) Head-to-head goal difference; 4) Head-to-head goals scored; 5) Goal difference; 6) Goals scored; 7) Fair-play points; 8) Draw.
(C) Champions; (R) Relegated

=== Position by round ===
Team ╲ Round	1	2	3	4	5	6	7	8	9	10	11	12	13	14	15	16	17	18	19	20	21	22	23	24	25	26	27	28	29	30	31	32	33	34
Arema	2	3	3	3	3	8	10	7	9	8	9	9	10	11	11	12	10	11	11	9	8	9	10	11	11	11	11	10	10	10	10	10	9	9
Bali United	9	12	14	8	9	14	11	8	8	10	10	11	11	7	8	8	8	8	8	8	10	11	11	9	10	10	10	9	8	8	8	8	8	8
Bhayangkara Presisi	14	15	15	10	11	9	12	9	7	7	6	7	7	10	10	9	9	9	9	10	9	8	8	7	6	5	5	4	4	6	7	7	7	6
Borneo Samarinda	6	2	1	2	1	1	1	1	1	1	1	1	1	1	2	1	2	2	2	2	2	3	3	3	2	2	2	2	2	2	2	2	2	2
Dewa United Banten	15	17	13	16	10	6	9	12	12	13	14	14	14	12	14	14	11	10	10	12	11	10	9	10	9	9	8	8	7	7	6	4	6	7
Madura United	12	8	8	12	13	15	15	13	13	12	11	12	13	14	13	13	14	14	14	14	14	14	14	14	16	16	16	15	16	15	14	15	15	14
Malut United	3	4	5	6	12	7	5	4	3	3	3	5	4	4	4	4	4	4	4	4	4	4	4	4	4	4	4	5	5	4	4	6	5	5
Persebaya	14	10	4	5	8	5	6	10	10	9	8	8	9	9	7	7	7	6	5	5	5	5	5	5	7	6	6	6	6	5	5	5	4	4
Persib	4	7	7	9	6	4	7	5	5	4	4	3	3	2	1	3	1	1	1	1	1	1	1	1	1	1	1	1	1	1	1	1	1	1
Persija	1	1	2	1	2	2	4	3	2	2	2	2	2	3	3	2	3	3	3	3	3	2	2	2	3	3	3	3	3	3	3	3	3	3
Persijap	11	5	10	7	5	10	13	14	15	15	16	16	16	17	17	17	18	16	17	17	17	15	15	15	14	14	14	13	13	13	15	13	13	13
Persik	8	14	16	13	7	11	8	11	11	11	13	13	12	13	12	11	13	13	12	11	12	12	12	12	12	12	12	12	12	12	12	12	12	12
Persis	5	11	11	14	17	18	17	16	17	17	17	18	18	18	18	18	16	18	18	18	18	18	17	17	15	15	15	16	15	16	16	16	16	16
Persita	18	18	18	18	16	12	2	2	4	5	7	6	6	6	5	5	5	5	6	6	6	6	7	6	5	7	7	7	9	9	9	9	10	10
PSBS	17	16	17	17	15	16	16	17	17	16	15	15	15	15	15	15	15	15	15	15	15	16	16	16	18	18	18	18	18	18	18	18	18	18
PSIM	7	6	6	4	4	3	3	6	6	6	5	4	5	5	6	6	6	7	7	7	7	7	6	8	8	8	9	11	11	11	11	11	11	11
PSM	10	13	12	15	18	13	14	15	14	14	12	10	8	8	9	10	12	12	13	13	13	13	13	13	13	13	13	14	14	14	13	14	14	15
Semen Padang	16	9	9	11	14	17	18	18	18	18	18	17	17	16	16	16	17	17	16	16	16	17	18	18	17	17	17	17	17	17	17	17	17	17

Qualification for AFC Champions League Two Play-off
Qualification for AFC Challenge League Group Stage
Relegation to 2026–27 Championship

Source: Super League 2025–26

== Results ==
Home \ Away	AFC	BLI	BFC	BOR	DUB	MDR	MLT	PBY	PSB	PSJ	JAP	KDR	PSO	PTR	BIK	JOG	PSM	SMP
Arema		3–4	2–1	1–3	1–2	2–2	1–1	0–4	1–2	1–2	1–0	2–1	2–0	0–1	4–1	3–1	3–0	3–0
Bali United	1–0		4–1	2–3	0–0	1–0	4–1	1–3	0–1	0–1	0–0	1–1	0–0	0–0	6–1	1–3	2–0	3–3
Bhayangkara Presisi	2–1	2–1		1–2	1–0	3–1	0–1	1–1	2–4	3–2	2–0	1–0	2–0	1–1	7–0	2–1	1–1	4–0
Borneo Samarinda	3–1	0–1	1–0		4–0	1–0	7–1	5–1	1–1	3–1	3–1	2–0	1–0	2–0	5–1	2–1	2–1	3–0
Dewa United Banten	2–0	0–1	0–2	2–1		0–2	1–3	1–1	2–2	1–3	1–0	3–1	5–1	1–0	3–1	1–0	0–1	1–0
Madura United	2–2	2–0	0–0	1–3	1–2		1–2	0–1	1–4	0–1	2–1	2–1	1–2	1–1	0–0	0–3	2–0	5–1
Malut United	1–1	3–3	1–2	3–2	1–2	4–1		0–2	2–0	2–3	4–0	4–0	5–2	1–1	6–2	0–2	3–3	1–0
Persebaya	1–1	5–2	1–2	2–2	1–1	1–2	2–1		2–2	1–3	4–0	5–0	2–1	1–0	4–0	0–1	1–0	1–0
Persib	0–0	3–2	2–0	3–1	1–0	5–0	2–0	1–0		1–0	0–0	3–0	2–0	1–0	1–0	1–0	1–0	2–0
Persija	0–2	1–1	3–0	2–2	1–1	2–0	1–1	3–0	1–2		2–0	3–1	4–0	4–0	3–1	2–0	2–1	3–0
Persijap	0–0	1–2	2–1	0–0	0–3	1–0	1–2	3–1	2–1	0–2		0–2	0–0	1–2	2–0	1–1	2–0	1–2
Persik	3–2	3–2	3–4	0–1	2–1	1–2	2–1	1–1	1–1	1–3	0–0		2–1	1–0	2–1	2–2	1–1	2–1
Persis	2–2	3–0	2–1	0–1	1–0	2–2	1–3	0–0	0–1	0–3	1–2	2–1		1–3	1–1	2–2	3–4	2–1
Persita	0–1	0–1	1–1	2–0	0–1	4–1	0–0	0–1	2–1	0–2	0–3	3–0	1–3		2–1	4–0	2–1	2–0
PSBS	2–5	0–3	4–1	0–1	0–5	0–0	0–7	0–0	0–3	0–1	3–2	1–2	2–2	2–1		2–4	1–2	0–2
PSIM	1–1	3–3	1–0	1–3	2–0	2–1	2–0	0–3	1–1	1–1	2–2	2–1	0–0	0–1	2–2		1–2	1–0
PSM	1–2	0–2	2–1	1–2	0–2	1–1	0–2	1–1	1–2	2–0	1–1	3–1	1–1	2–4	5–0	0–0		0–0
Semen Padang	1–2	1–3	0–1	0–2	2–0	0–1	2–2	0–7	0–2	1–0	0–2	0–3	2–3	1–0	1–2	0–0	1–1	

Source: Super League 2025–26
Legend: Blue = home team win; Yellow = draw; Red = away team win.
For upcoming matches, an "a" indicates there is an article about the rivalry between the two participants.

== Season statistics ==
=== Top scorers ===
Rank	Player	Club	Goals
1	(Brazil) David da Silva	Malut United	23
2	(Argentina) Mariano Peralta	Borneo Samarinda	20
3	(Brazil) Dalberto	Arema	19
3	(Brazil) Alex Martins	Dewa United Banten	19
5	(Brazil) Maxwell	Persija	16
6	(Mali) Moussa Sidibé	Bhayangkara Presisi	15
6	(Brazil) Joel Vinícius	Borneo Samarinda (7); Arema (8)	15
8	(Colombia) Juan Villa	Borneo Samarinda	13
8	(Mexico) Francisco Rivera	Persebaya	13
8	(Spain) José Enrique	Persik	13

=== Hat-tricks ===
Player	For	Against	Result	Date
(Brazil) Dalberto	Arema	PSBS	4–1 (H)	11 August 2025
(Brazil) Ciro Alves	Malut United	Madura United	4–1 (H)	19 September 2025
(Brazil) Maxwell	Persija	PSBS	3–1 (H)	31 October 2025
(Brazil) Alex Tanque	PSM	PSBS	5–0 (H)	21 November 2025
(Brazil) David da Silva	Malut United	Persis	5–2 (H)	2 May 2026
(Brazil) Alex Martins^{4}	Dewa United Banten	PSBS	5–0 (A)	8 May 2026
(Brazil) Bruno Paraíba	Persebaya	Semen Padang	7–0 (A)	15 May 2026

Note:
^{4} Player scored 4 goals

=== Top assists ===
Rank	Player	Club	Assist
1	(Argentina) Mariano Peralta	Borneo Samarinda	14
2	(Spain) Tyronne del Pino	Malut United	12
3	(Brazil) Caxambu	Borneo Samarinda	11
4	(Mali) Moussa Sidibé	Bhayangkara Presisi	9
4	(Colombia) Juan Villa	Borneo Samarinda	9
4	(Mexico) Francisco Rivera	Persebaya	9
4	(Brazil) Berguinho	Persib	9
4	(Brazil) Allano	Persija	9
4	(Indonesia) Ezra Walian	Persik	9
4	(Brazil) Victor Luiz	PSM	9

=== Clean sheets ===
Rank	Player	Club	Clean sheets
1	(Indonesia) Teja Paku Alam	Persib	18
2	(Netherlands) Mike Hauptmeijer	Bali United	12
2	(Indonesia) Nadeo Argawinata	Borneo Samarinda	12
4	(Netherlands) Sonny Stevens	Dewa United Banten	10
5	(Indonesia) Aqil Savik	Bhayangkara Presisi	9
5	(Indonesia) Cahya Supriadi	PSIM	9
7	(Indonesia) Ernando Ari	Persebaya	8
7	(Brazil) Carlos Eduardo	Persija	8
7	(Portugal) Igor Rodrigues	Persita	8

== Attendances ==
=== Overall ===
Pos	Team	Total	High	Low	Average	Change
1	Persib	411,830	30,510	12,123	24,225	+64.4%
2	Persija	377,025	56,989	5,126	22,178	+43.9%
3	Persebaya	278,213	33,432	7,527	16,365	+11.1%
4	Borneo Samarinda	119,048	11,554	3,950	7,003	+85.7%
5	Persis	112,536	13,980	3,291	6,620	−11.6%
6	Bali United	108,961	14,514	3,088	6,409	+30.1%
7	PSIM	94,841	8,725	1,670	5,579	n/a^{†}
8	Semen Padang	80,770	12,250	1,025	4,751	−11.6%
9	Persijap	58,160	8,212	1,089	3,421	n/a^{†}
10	Bhayangkara Presisi	56,173	7,013	981	3,304	n/a^{†}
11	PSM	50,785	8,250	1,035	2,987	+30.5%
12	Arema	43,245	10,314	405	2,544	+355.1%
13	Persita	42,434	8,735	304	2,496	+27.6%
14	Persik	41,070	7,153	1,197	2,416	−5.5%
15	Malut United	39,101	4,947	817	2,300	−40.6%
16	Madura United	30,599	4,947	499	1,800	+43.9%
17	Dewa United Banten	15,036	2,021	487	884	+271.4%
18	PSBS	344	150	94	20	−98.5%
	League total	1,960,171	56,989	94	6,406	+29.1%

Source: Liga Super 2025–26
Notes:
^{†} Clubs that played in the Liga 2 last season

=== Home matches played ===
As of 11 March 2026

Club \ matches played	1	2	3	4	5	6	7	8	9	10	11	12	13	14	15	16	17	Total
Arema	2,336	840	819	5,400	805	10,314	780	405	2,350	1,068	2,223	4,125	1,749	2,096	0^{1}	1,433	6,502	43,245
Bali United	10,302	11,323	6,530	4,262	14,514	3,811	3,885	8,501	4,195	12,163	9,811	0^{1}	0^{1}	3,734	3,088	5,485	7,357	108,961
Bhayangkara Presisi	5,391	2,214	1,632	3,106	981	3,362	3,260	4,026	2,647	4,238	2,389	4,357	6,907	1,455	7,013	1,798	1,397	56,173
Borneo Samarinda	5,531	5,153	5,321	9,996	4,821	9,038	8,149	8,246	6,771	5,544	6,434	8,881	11,554	3,950	6,503	7,308	5,848	119,048
Dewa United Banten	1,967	836	0^{1}	534	2,021	791	933	1,023	487	924	856	814	1,076	0^{1}	989	792	993	15,036
Madura United	4,839	3,244	2,315	3,197	1,099	4,153	923	0^{1}	2,801	667	1,169	499	614	737	866	749	2,727	30,599
Malut United	4,703	2,312	4,315	2,319	1,560	4,947	3,259	1,261	1,081	924	817	4,332	2,211	2,112	2,043	0^{1}	905	39,101
Persebaya	17,456	10,200	9,321	33,432	9,428	29,476	9,432	12,376	12,978	23,431	15,425	7,527	30,000	12,444	10,390	8,027	26,870	278,213
Persib	14,853	22,642	13,540	24,745	26,160	24,730	29,288	29,616	28,682	29,374	17,558	12,123	19,330	28,932	29,814	29,933	30,510	411,830
Persija	29,153	22,195	29,389	0^{1}	5,126	56,150	15,317	26,113	9,237	56,989	8,490	19,709	19,555	39,443	12,827	5,925	21,407	377,025
Persijap	8,212	5,713	2,868	4,511	4,561	1,515	1,459	0^{1}	2,580	4,156	4,758	8,193	6,557	0^{1}	0^{1}	1,988	1,089	58,160
Persik	1,197	4,223	2,982	1,554	1,888	4,724	3,571	2,772	2,493	0^{1}	2,311	1,609	1,815	1,575	1,203	0^{1}	7,153	41,070
Persis	13,980	10,691	5,515	3,371	13,676	4,423	5,412	3,510	11,769	3,291	5,414	6,473	7,131	0^{1}	0^{1}	7,941	9,939	112,536
Persita	2,831	0^{1}	0^{1}	4,231	2,483	4,093	2,841	4,067	3,099	8,735	1,522	2,427	2,807	1,313	304	1,681	0^{1}	42,434
PSBS	150	100	94	0^{1}	0^{1}	0^{1}	0^{1}	0^{1}	0^{1}	0^{1}	0^{1}	0^{1}	0^{1}	0^{1}	0^{1}	0^{1}	0^{1}	344
PSIM	8,618	8,725	8,068	3,810	3,823	4,901	6,202	5,540	7,405	8,476	5,983	6,691	1,866	0^{1}	1,670	5,035	8,028	94,841
PSM	3,560	6,116	3,249	1,786	2,875	1,261	6,434	2,865	2,225	1,035	1,589	1,624	1,285	4,980	1,651	0^{1}	8,250	50,785
Semen Padang	5,960	5,276	4,725	4,100	3,278	5,384	12,250	6,214	3,150	6,183	4,560	4,025	10,800	1,284	1,050	1,015	1,516	80,770
League total																		1,960,171

Source: Liga Super 2025–26

Notes:
Matches played behind closed doors.

== Awards ==
=== Monthly awards ===
Month	Player of the Month		Young Player of the Month		Coach of the Month		Goal of the Month		Assist of the Month		Save of the Month	
Month	Player	Team	Player	Team	Coach	Team	Player	Team	Player	Team	Player	Team
August	(Brazil) Victor Luiz	PSM	(Indonesia) Toni Firmansyah	Persebaya	(Brazil) Maurício Souza	Persija	(Brazil) Maxwell	Persija	(Colombia) Juan Villa	Borneo Samarinda	(Indonesia) Cahya Supriadi	PSIM
August	References:											
September	(Colombia) Juan Villa	Borneo Samarinda	(Indonesia) Raka Cahyana	PSIM	(Brazil) Fábio Lefundes	Borneo Samarinda	(Indonesia) Esal Sahrul	Persita	(Indonesia) Rizky Eka Pratama	PSM	(Brazil) Rodrigo Moura	Persijap
September	References:											
October	No award being given											
November	(Argentina) Mariano Peralta	Borneo Samarinda	(Indonesia) Rivaldo Pakpahan	Borneo Samarinda	(Brazil) Maurício Souza	Persija	(Indonesia) Arkhan Fikri	Arema	(Indonesia) Ryan Kurnia	Bhayangkara Presisi	(Indonesia) Hilmansyah	PSM
November	References:											
December	(Brazil) Lulinha	Madura United	(Indonesia) Arkhan Fikri	Arema	(Croatia) Bojan Hodak	Persib	(Indonesia) Hokky Caraka	Persita	(Indonesia) Taufik Rustam	Malut United	(Portugal) Igor Rodrigues	Persita
December	References:											
January	(Spain) Tyronne del Pino	Malut United	(Indonesia) Dony Tri Pamungkas	Persija	(Portugal) Bernardo Tavares	Persebaya	(Indonesia) Rachmat Irianto	Persebaya	(Indonesia) Ezra Walian	Persik	(Indonesia) Teja Paku Alam	Persib
January	References:											
February	(Mali) Moussa Sidibé	Bhayangkara Presisi	(Indonesia) Dony Tri Pamungkas	Persija	(Croatia) Bojan Hodak	Persib	(Indonesia) Rizky Eka Pratama	PSM	(Indonesia) Cahya Supriadi	PSiM	(Indonesia) Reza Arya Pratama	PSM
February	References:											
March	(Spain) Rayco Rodríguez	Persita	(Indonesia) Zanadin Fariz	Persis	(Spain) Carlos Peña	Persita	(Argentina) Mariano Peralta	Borneo Samarinda	(Indonesia) Dicky Kurniawan	Persijap	(Indonesia) Nadeo Argawinata	Borneo Samarinda
March	References:											
April	(Argentina) Mariano Peralta	Borneo Samarinda	(Indonesia) Dony Tri Pamungkas	Persija	(Brazil) Fábio Lefundes	Borneo Samarinda	(Indonesia) Rendy Sanjaya	Persik	(Italy) Federico Barba	Persib	(Brazil) Lucas Frigeri	Arema
April	References:											
May												
May	References:											

=== Annual awards ===
Award	Winner	Club	Ref.
Best Player	(Argentina) Mariano Peralta	Borneo Samarinda	
Best Coach	(Croatia) Bojan Hodak	Persib	
Best Young Player	(Indonesia) Dony Tri Pamungkas	Persija	
Best Goalkeeper	(Indonesia) Nadeo Argawinata	Borneo Samarinda	
Best Goal	(Indonesia) Muhammad Iqbal	PSIM	
Fair Play Team	Borneo Samarinda		

=== Best XI of the season ===
Pos.	Player	Team	Ref.
GK	(Indonesia) Nadeo Argawinata	Borneo Samarinda	
DF	(Indonesia) Arief Catur	Persebaya	
DF	(Italy) Federico Barba	Persib	
DF	(Brazil) João Ferrari	Bali United	
DF	(Indonesia) Dony Tri Pamungkas	Persija	
MF	(Indonesia) Thom Haye	Persib	
MF	(Colombia) Juan Villa	Borneo Samarinda	
MF	(Mexico) Francisco Rivera	Persebaya	
FW	(Argentina) Mariano Peralta	Borneo Samarinda	
FW	(Brazil) David da Silva	Malut United	
FW	(Indonesia) Beckham Putra	Persib	

== See also ==
- 2025–26 Championship
- 2025–26 Liga Nusantara
- 2025–26 Liga 4
