= Muhammad Husseini =

Mohammad Hosseini, or other spelling variations, may refer to:

- Mohammed Tahir al-Husayni (1842–1908), Palestinian Hanafi cleric
- Mohammad Hosseini (politician) (born 1961), Iranian politician
- Mohamad Ali El Husseini (born 1974), Saudi Arabian scholar and writer
- Mohammad Hosseini (footballer, born 1979), Iranian footballer
- Mohammad Hosseini (protester) (1983–2023), Iranian protester who was executed by the government of Iran
- Mohammad Reza Hosseini (born 1989), Iranian footballer
- Mohamed Hussein al-Husseini (active 1991–1994), member of Hezbollah
- Mohammad Hosseini (footballer, born 1995), Iranian footballer
- Mohammad Hosseini (footballer, born 2000), Iranian footballer
- Mohamad Baker El Housseini (born 2002), Lebanese footballer
- Mohammad Ali Hosseini (active 2006–2023), Iranian politician
- Mohamed Husseini, Tazanian footballer
