= Pakpahan =

Batak surname originating in Indonesia

Pakpahan is one of Toba Batak clans originating in North Sumatra, Indonesia. People of this clan bear the clan's name as their surname. Notable people of this clan include:

- Muchtar Pakpahan (1953–2021), Indonesian labor leader
- Rivaldo Pakpahan (born 2003), Indonesian professional footballer
