= Rodrigo Mora =

Rodrigo Mora may refer to:

- Rodrigo Mora (footballer, born 1987), Uruguayan football striker
- Rodrigo Mora (footballer, born 2007), Portuguese football attacking midfielder

== See also ==
- Rodrigo Moura (Brazilian footballer, born 1996)
