= Ousmane Maiket =

Indonesian footballer (born 2007)

Personal information
- Full name: Ousmane Maiket Camara
- Date of birth: 4 October 2007 (age 19)
- Place of birth: Yogyakarta, Indonesia
- Height: 1.86 m (6 ft 1 in)
- Position: Forward

Team information
- Current team: Kendal Tornado (on loan from Borneo Samarinda)
- Number: 99

Youth career
- –2024: JK Academy

Senior career*
Years	Team	Apps	(Gls)
2024–	Borneo Samarinda	1	(0)
2024–2025	→ PSIM Yogyakarta (loan)	0	(0)
2026–	→ Kendal Tornado (loan)	7	(4)

International career^{‡}
2024–	Indonesia U20	3	(0)
- * Club domestic league appearances and goals as of 29 October 2026 ‡ National team caps and goals as of 1 September 2024

Ousmane Maiket Camara (born 4 October 2007) is an Indonesian professional footballer who plays as a forward for Championship club Kendal Tornado, on loan from Borneo Samarinda.

== Early life ==
Maiket was born on 4 October 2007 in Yogyakarta, Indonesia to a Guinean footballer father and an Indonesian mother. Growing up in Yogyakarta, Indonesia, he started playing football in kindergarten.

== Club career ==
As a youth player, Maiket joined the JK Academy. In 2024, he started his senior career with Borneo FC Samarinda. The same year, he was sent on loan to PSIM Yogyakarta.

Ahead of the 2025–26 season, he returned to Borneo Samarinda and became part of Borneo's main squad after a loan spell at PSIM Yogyakarta. At just 17 years old, he made his professional debut for Borneo Samarinda on 24 August 2025 as a substitute in a 3–1 home win against Persijap Jepara at the Segiri Stadium.

== Style of play ==
Maiket plays as a forward and is right-footed. Indonesian news website Tribun Network wrote in 2024 that he "plays with a high work ethic and attacks that are enough to make the opponent confused".

== Honours ==
PSIM Yogyakarta

- Liga 2: 2024–25
