= Moussa Sidibé (Malian footballer) =

Malian footballer

Personal information
- Full name: Moussa Sidibé
- Date of birth: 21 November 1994 (age 31)
- Place of birth: Bamako, Mali
- Height: 1.70 m (5 ft 7 in)
- Position: Winger

Team information
- Current team: Bhayangkara Presisi
- Number: 17

Youth career
- 2011–2013: Calasanz

Senior career*
Years	Team	Apps	(Gls)
2013–2014	Almazán	13	(0)
2014	Ebro	3	(0)
2014–2015	Épila	6	(0)
2015	Montecarlo	13	(2)
2015–2016	Benferri	10	(1)
2016–2017	Ibiza	46	(28)
2017–2018	Guadalajara	16	(5)
2018	Algeciras	17	(4)
2018–2019	Llagostera	39	(11)
2019–2020	Andorra	26	(6)
2020–2022	Ponferradina	7	(0)
2021	→ Córdoba (loan)	9	(0)
2021–2022	→ Costa Brava (loan)	13	(0)
2022–2023	Johor Darul Ta'zim	3	(0)
2022	Johor Darul Ta'zim II	16	(5)
2023	→ Ratchaburi (loan)	9	(0)
2023–2025	Persis Solo	54	(19)
2025–2026	Johor Darul Ta'zim	2	(0)
2026	→ Bhayangkara Presisi (loan)	16	(15)
2026–	Bhayangkara Presisi	1	(0)
- * Club domestic league appearances and goals as of 5 September 2026

Moussa Sidibé (born 21 November 1994) is a Malian professional footballer who plays as a winger for Super League club Bhayangkara Presisi.

== Club career ==
Born in Bamako, Sidibé moved to Spain at the age of 12, and finished his formation with CD Calasanz. He made his senior debut with Tercera División side SD Almazán during the 2013–14 season, before moving to fellow league team Ebro in January 2014.

=== Early career ===
Sidibé subsequently represented lower league sides Épila, UD Montecarlo, Benferri CF, Ibiza, Guadalajara (which he left after denouncing the club in the Association of Spanish Footballers), Algeciras and Badalona Futur, helping in the promotions of the latter two sides to Segunda División B.

=== Andorra ===
On 21 August 2019, he was transferred to Andorra in the third division, being an undisputed starter as his side achieved a mid-table finish.

=== Ponferradina ===
On 10 August 2020, Sidibé joined Ponferradina of Segunda División. He made his professional debut on 12 September, starting in a 1–2 home loss against Castellón for the second division championship.

==== Córdoba (loan) ====
On 31 January 2021, after being sparingly used, Sidibé was loaned to third division side Córdoba for the remainder of the season.

==== Costa Brava (loan) ====
On 31 August, he moved to Primera División RFEF side Badalona Futur on loan for one year.

=== Johor Darul Ta'zim ===
On 21 January 2022, Sidibé's loan was cut short, and he subsequently terminated his contract with Ponfe to join Johor Darul Ta'zim.

== Career statistics ==
As of 6 September 2026

Club	Season	League			Cup		Continental		Other		Total	
Club	Season	Division	Apps	Goals	Apps	Goals	Apps	Goals	Apps	Goals	Apps	Goals
Andorra	2019–20	Segunda División B	26	6	1	0	—		—		27	6
Ponferradina	2020–21	Segunda División	7	0	1	0	—		—		8	0
Ponferradina	2021–22	Segunda División	0	0	0	0	—		—		0	0
Ponferradina	Total		7	0	1	0	—		—		8	0
Córdoba (loan)	2020–21	Segunda División B	9	0	0	0	—		—		9	0
Costa Brava (loan)	2021–22	Primera División RFEF	13	0	0	0	—		—		13	0
Johor Darul Ta'zim	2022	Malaysia Super League	3	0	0	0	0	0	0	0	3	0
Johor Darul Ta'zim II	2022	Malaysia Premier League	16	5	0	0	0	0	0	0	16	5
Ratchaburi (loan)	2022–23	Thai League 1	9	0	0	0	0	0	0	0	9	0
Persis Solo	2023–24	Liga 1	27	11	0	0	0	0	0	0	27	11
Persis Solo	2024–25	Liga 1	27	8	0	0	0	0	0	0	27	8
Persis Solo	Total		54	19	0	0	0	0	0	0	54	19
Johor Darul Ta'zim	2025–26	Malaysia Super League	2	0	2	0	0	0	1	0	5	0
Bhayangkara (loan)	2025–26	Super League	16	15	0	0	0	0	0	0	16	15
Bhayangkara	2026–27	Super League	1	0	0	0	0	0	0	0	1	0
Career total			156	45	4	0	0	0	1	0	161	45

== Honours ==
Johor Darul Ta'zim

- Malaysia Charity Shield: 2025

Individual

- Super League Player of the Month: February 2026
- APPI Indonesian Football Award Best XI: 2025–26
