= Nadeo Argawinata =

Indonesian professional footballer

- Nadeo with Persija in 2026

Personal information
- Full name: Nadeo Argawinata
- Date of birth: 9 March 1997 (age 29)
- Place of birth: Kediri, Indonesia
- Height: 1.89 m (6 ft 2 in)
- Position: Goalkeeper

Team information
- Current team: Persija Jakarta
- Number: 23

Youth career
- SSB Macan Putih
- 2015–2016: Persik Kediri

Senior career*
Years	Team	Apps	(Gls)
2016–2019	Borneo	46	(0)
2020–2023	Bali United	34	(0)
2023–2026	Borneo	96	(0)
2026–	Persija Jakarta	10	(0)

International career^{‡}
2015	Indonesia U19	1	(0)
2019	Indonesia U23	10	(0)
2021–	Indonesia	26	(0)
Medal record
Men's football
Representing Indonesia
FIFA ASEAN Cup
Winner	2026 Indonesia	Team
AFF Championship
Runner-up	2020 Singapore	Team
Southeast Asian Games
Silver medal – second place	2019 Philippines	Team
- * Club domestic league appearances and goals as of 22 November 2026 ‡ National team caps and goals as of 01:28, 4 August 2026 (UTC+7)

Nadeo Argawinata (born 9 March 1997), also known as Nadeo Winata, is an Indonesian professional footballer who plays as a goalkeeper for Super League club Persija Jakarta and the Indonesia national team.

== Club career ==
=== Borneo ===
After years of training in youth clubs in Kediri Regency on Java island, Argawinata moved to Borneo island to look for professional playing time and joined Borneo for the 2016 Indonesia Soccer Championship A.

At the age of 19, he became the youngest goalkeeper to play in the highest level of Indonesian football. Argawinata made his first appearance on 22 March 2016 in 2016 Bhayangkara Cup, coming on as a substitute for Galih Sudaryono in the 75th minute, then the final result, Borneo lost 3–1 against PS TNI.

Argawinata made his first official Liga 1 appearance on 3 June 2017 in an East Kalimantan Derby, coming on as a starter in a 3–2 lost with Persiba Balikpapan at the Parikesit Stadium. He was Borneo's starting goalkeeper in the 2018 Liga 1 and 2019 Liga 1 seasons. His stable performance earned him a spot in the Indonesia national under-23 football team that competed in the 2019 Southeast Asian Games.

=== Bali United ===
After he won national recognition through his performance in the 2019 Southeast Asian Games, Bali United contracted him from Borneo on 29 December 2019. However, he failed to win the starting spot in 2020 and 2021 due to the continued prominence of Bali's veteran goalkeeper Wawan Hendrawan.

On 23 October 2021, Argawinata made his league debut, starting in a 1–2 lost against Bhayangkara at the Maguwoharjo Stadium.

== International career ==
Nadeo is mostly known for his breakout performance at the 2019 Southeast Asian Games in the Philippines with the Indonesia national under-23 football team that won silver. Before that, he played one game with Indonesia national under-19 football team in 2015. He received his first call to join the senior Indonesia national football team in May 2021. He earned his first cap in friendly match against Oman on 29 May 2021. On 25 December 2021, Nadeo stopped a 90th-minute penalty from Singapore international Faris Ramli in his seventh international appearance of senior team, arguably the most crucial moment in the 2020 AFF Championship semifinal match against the host. As the score remained 2-2, the match continued into extra, time during which Indonesia added two goals that ushered the Garuda into the final. Argawinata's save became one of the most viewed clips in Indonesia in the last week of 2021.

Nadeo helped the national team qualify for the 2023 AFC Asian Cup. In the qualifiers, Nadeo stopped a penalty from Jordan. In September 2022, he was part of the starting eleven in a friendly match against Curaçao which resulted in a 3–2 win. Nadeo was also called for up for the 2022 AFF Championship.

On 14 January 2024, he received a call-up to the Indonesia national team one day before the start of Group D matches of the 2023 AFC Asian Cup, as Persikabo 1973 goalkeeper Syahrul Trisna sustained an injury.

== Career statistics ==
=== Club ===
As of match played 23 May 2026

Club	Season	League			Cup (Note: Includes Piala Indonesia)		League Cup		Continental		Other		Total	
Club	Season	Division	Apps	Goals	Apps	Goals	Apps	Goals	Apps	Goals	Apps	Goals	Apps	Goals
Borneo	2016	ISC A	3	0	0	0	–		–		0	0	3	0
Borneo	2017	Liga 1	5	0	0	0	–		–		0	0	5	0
Borneo	2018	Liga 1	19	0	0	0	–		–		3 (Note: Appearances in Indonesia President's Cup)	0	22	0
Borneo	2019	Liga 1	19	0	3	0	–		–		2	0	24	0
Borneo	Total		46	0	3	0	–		0	0	5	0	54	0
Bali United	2020	Liga 1	0	0	0	0	–		3 (Note: Appearances in AFC Cup)	0	0	0	3	0
Bali United	2021–22	Liga 1	17	0	0	0	–		0	0	0	0	17	0
Bali United	2022–23	Liga 1	17	0	0	0	–		2	0	0	0	19	0
Bali United	Total		34	0	0	0	–		5	0	0	0	39	0
Borneo Samarinda	2023–24	Liga 1	33	0	0	0	–		–		0	0	33	0
Borneo Samarinda	2024–25	Liga 1	29	0	0	0	–		5 (Note: Appearances in ASEAN Club Championship)	0	0	0	34	0
Borneo Samarinda	2025–26	Super League	34	0	0	0	–		–		0	0	34	0
Borneo Samarinda	Total		96	0	0	0	–		5	0	0	0	101	0
Persija Jakarta	2026–27	Super League	10	0	0	0	0	0	–		0	0	10	0
Career total			176	0	3	0	0	0	10	0	5	0	204	0

=== International ===
As of match played 4 August 2026

Appearances and goals by national team and year
National team	Year	Apps	Goals
Indonesia	2021	8	0
Indonesia	2022	10	0
Indonesia	2023	6	0
Indonesia	2026	2	0
Total		26	0

== Honours ==
Bali United

- Super League: 2021–22

Borneo Samarinda

- Piala Presiden runner-up: 2024

Indonesia U-23

- SEA Games silver medal: 2019

Indonesia

- FIFA ASEAN Cup: 2026
- AFF Championship runner-up: 2020
- FIFA Series runner-up: 2026

Individual

- APPI Indonesian Football Award Best Goalkeeper: 2023–24, 2025–2026
- APPI Indonesian Football Award Best XI: 2023–24, 2025–26
- Super League Save of the Month: March 2026
- Super League Best XI: 2025–26
- Super League Best Goalkeeper: 2025–26
