= Kiko (footballer, born 2000) =

Portuguese footballer (born 2000)

Personal information
- Full name: Francisco Pereira Carneiro
- Date of birth: 25 March 2000 (age 26)
- Place of birth: Paços de Ferreira, Portugal
- Height: 1.82 m (6 ft 0 in)
- Position: Centre-back

Team information
- Current team: Persik Kediri
- Number: 3

Youth career
- 2016–2017: Freamunde U19

Senior career*
Years	Team	Apps	(Gls)
2017–2018	Freamunde	9	(0)
2018–2021	Vizela	5	(0)
2020	→ Mirandela (loan)	5	(0)
2020–2021	→ Pedras Salgadas (loan)	16	(1)
2021–2022	Valadares Gaia	22	(0)
2022–2023	Montalegre	21	(0)
2023–2024	RANS Nusantara	30	(1)
2024–	Persik Kediri	59	(1)
- * Club domestic league appearances and goals as of 31 October 2026

Francisco Pereira Carneiro (born 25 March 2000), commonly known as Kiko, is a Portuguese professional footballer who plays as a centre-back for Super League club Persik Kediri.

== Club career ==
=== Montalegre ===
In the 2022–23 season, Kiko signed a contract with Montalegre. He made his league debut on 20 August 2022 as a starter in a 4–2 lose over Anandia. In a match against Felgueiras 1932 a week later, he played the full 90 minutes for the first time in a 0–2 home lose in game-week 2.

=== RANS Nusantara ===
Ahead of the 2023–24 season, he went abroad for the first time and signed a contract with Indonesian Liga 1 club RANS Nusantara. Kiko made his club debut in a pre-season friendly match on 21 June 2023 as a starter in a 2–1 win against Persija Jakarta at the PTIK Stadium. And made his league debut on 3 July 2023 in a 2–1 win against Persikabo 1973 at the Maguwoharjo Stadium. Heading into Week 10, he has consistently been coach Eduardo Almeida’s go-to player for anchoring the team’s defense. His position is irreplaceable, as he has logged 900 minutes of playing time. On 2 September 2023, Kiko scored his first league goal for RANS Nusantara in 2023–24 season, earning them a 1–0 victory over Persik Kediri. Kiko finished the season with only one goal in 30 league appearances.

=== Persik Kediri ===
On 20 July 2024, Kiko signed a contract with another Liga 1 club Persik Kediri. He made his league debut in a 0–2 won against PSS Sleman on 19 August 2024, coming on as a starter. He was named team captain for three consecutive matches against Barito Putera on 31 January 2025, Persita Tangerang a week later, and Persis Solo on 14 February. He made 29 league appearances for Persik Kediri during the 2024–25 season.

On 10 August 2025, he started his match in the 2025–26 season for Persik Kediri in a 1–1 draw over Bali United. On 5 March 2025, during the match against Persib Bandung, he received his second yellow card from the referee in the 73rd minute, which resulted in his ejection from the field and a one-game suspension.

On 20 February 2026, he scored his first league goal for Persik Kediri against Bhayangkara Presisi, scored the equalizing in a 3–4 lose at Brawijaya Stadium. Kiko missed nine consecutive games until the end of the season due to a serious injury, which forced him to return to Portugal for more intensive treatment.
