= Maicon (footballer, born 1996) =

Brazilian footballer

Personal information
- Full name: Maicon de Souza da Silva
- Date of birth: 16 March 1996 (age 30)
- Place of birth: Rio de Janeiro, Brazil
- Height: 1.75 m (5 ft 9 in)
- Position: Winger

Senior career*
Years	Team	Apps	(Gls)
2017–2018	Duquecaxiense	16	(6)
2018–2019	Ermesinde	20	(4)
2019	Tirsense	10	(0)
2019	Ermesinde	14	(3)
2021–2022	Bangu	3	(0)
2022	Rio de Janeiro	11	(2)
2023	Barcelona	8	(0)
2023	Jequié	6	(2)
2023–2024	Naxxar Lions	24	(2)
2024–2025	Birkirkara	11	(0)
2025	Naxxar Lions	16	(3)
2025–2026	Borneo Samarinda	15	(2)
2026	Semen Padang	12	(1)
- * Club domestic league appearances and goals as of 15 May 2026

Maicon de Souza da Silva (born 16 March 1996), simply known as Maicon, is a Brazilian professional footballer who plays as a winger.

== Club career ==
Born in Rio de Janeiro, Brazil, Maicon spent his early career in Brazil at a young age with Duquecaxiense and abroad for the first time to Portugal where he played for Ermesinde, and Tirsense.

=== Naxxar Lions ===
He went to Malta and joined the Maltese Premier League club Naxxar Lions in the 2023–24 season. He made his league debut on 16 September 2023 as a starter in a 5–1 lose over Marsaxlokk. On 1 October 2023, he picked up his first win with Naxxar Lions in his fourth appearances in a 4–0 home win over Santa Lucia. On 3 December 2023, Maicon scored his first league goal for Naxxar Lions in a 2–1 home win over Gudja United. He added his second goals for the team on 3 March 2024 with one goal against Hibernians in a 0–2 away win.

=== Birkirkara ===
He was signed for Birkirkara and played in Maltese Premier League in 2024–25 season. Maicon made his league debut for Birkirkara on 16 August 2024 as a starter in a 3–3 draw over Balzan.

=== Return to Naxxar Lions ===
On 10 January 2025, Maltese club, Naxxar Lions announced a deal for Maicon. He made his club debut of the season on 18 January 2025 in a match against Sliema Wanderers. On 15 February 2025, Maicon scored his first goal for Naxxar Lions in a 2–1 home win against former club Birkirkara.

=== Borneo Samarinda ===
On 24 June 2025, Maicon moved to Asia and signed a contract with Indonesian Super League club Borneo Samarinda.
