= Caxambu (footballer) =

Brazilian footballer

Personal information
- Full name: Westherley Garcia Nogueira
- Date of birth: 23 March 1997 (age 29)
- Place of birth: Caxambu, Brazil
- Height: 1.80 m (5 ft 11 in)
- Position: Left-back

Team information
- Current team: Borneo Samarinda
- Number: 23

Youth career
- Cruzeiro

Senior career*
Years	Team	Apps	(Gls)
2019	Atlético Três Corações	5	(1)
2020	Tupynambás	0	(0)
2020	XV de Jaú	8	(0)
2020	Uberaba	5	(1)
2021	Juventude Samas	18	(1)
2021	Nacional de Muriaé	6	(0)
2022	São José-SP	16	(2)
2022	Veranópolis	7	(0)
2022	Atibaia	0	(0)
2022	Inter de Santa Maria	0	(0)
2023	Resende	6	(0)
2023	Caldense	4	(0)
2023	União Luziense	9	(0)
2023	São Bento	0	(0)
2023	West Armenia	11	(0)
2024	Juventus-SP	16	(0)
2024	Veranópolis	10	(1)
2024	Naxxar Lions	12	(3)
2025	Anápolis	24	(1)
2025–	Borneo Samarinda	34	(1)
- * Club domestic league appearances and goals as of 21:51, 17 June 2026 (UTC)

Westherley Garcia Nogueira (born 23 March 1997), commonly known as Caxambu, is a Brazilian professional footballer who plays as a left-back for Super League club Borneo Samarinda.

== Club career ==
=== Early career in Brazil ===
Caxambu began his football career at Cruzeiro youth academy in Brazil before playing for several domestic clubs.

=== Move to Europe ===
He later moved to Europe, where he played in lower-tier competitions, gaining international experience and improving his adaptability in various tactical systems.

=== Borneo FC Samarinda ===
On 17 July 2025, Caxambu was announced as the ninth foreign signing for Borneo Samarinda ahead of the 2025–26 season Super League. He joined the team's training camp in Yogyakarta alongside fellow foreign recruit Juan Villa. On 8 August 2025, Caxambu made his league debut for the club in a match against Bhayangkara Presisi, playing the full 90 minute in a 1–0 win.

== Style of play ==
Caxambu is primarily a left-back capable of operating on either flank, praised for his pace, stamina, and overlapping runs, as well as his defensive discipline.
