= Fábio Lefundes =

Brazilian football manager (born 1972)

Personal information
- Date of birth: 25 August 1972 (age 54)
- Place of birth: Rio de Janeiro, Brazil
- Height: 1.86 m (6 ft 1 in)

Team information
- Current team: Java United

Managerial career
- Years: Team
- 1996–1998: Fluminense Women
- 2009: Al Raed (Assistant)
- 2012–2013: Jeonbuk Hyundai Motors (Caretaker)
- 2017–2019: Shandong Taishan (Assistant)
- 2020: Botafogo (Assistant)
- 2021–2023: Madura United
- 2023: Shandong Taishan (Assistant)
- 2024–2025: Persita Tangerang
- 2025–2026: Borneo Samarinda
- 2026–: Java United

Fábio Araujo Lefundes is a Brazilian professional football manager. He is currently the head coach of Indonesia Super League club Java United.

== Managerial career ==
=== Middle East ===
Lefundes spent two seasons at Al Raed in Saudi Arabia and one season at Mesaimeer in Qatar. At Al Raed, he was assistant coach and fitness coach, and was also interim coach for two months in the 2010–11 season.

=== Jeonbuk Hyundai Motors ===
Lefundes first came to Jeonbuk Hyundai Motors as a physical coach in January 2011. His influence on the physical aspect of the team resulted in the club being crowned as 2011 K-League champions and runners-up of the 2011 AFC Champions League.

The following year, Lefundes was rewarded with a three-year contract and moved up to the assistant coach position whilst still co-ordinating the club's fitness program. During the first half of the 2013 season, he was interim head coach, replacing Choi Kang-Hee who became manager of the South Korea national team.

During his seven years at Jeonbuk, Lefundes won four K-League Classics (2011, 2014, 2015, and 2017) and the 2016 AFC Champions League. Jeonbuk were also runners-up in two K-League Classics (2012 and 2016) and the 2011 AFC Champions League.

=== Shandong Luneng Taishan ===
Lefundes then moved to China's Shandong Luneng Taishan. Lefundes worked at the club for two seasons (2018 and 2019).

His first season at Shandong Taishan was a success, with the team finishing third in the Chinese Super League and runners-up in the Chinese FA Cup, losing to Beijing Guoan over two legs.

The following season, Shandong Taishan participated in the AFC Champions League. The club managed to finish top of their group, before being eliminated in the Round of 16 by Guangzhou Evergrande on penalties. However, Shandong Taishan didn't achieve the same success in the league as the previous season, finishing fifth. Once again they reached the Chinese FA Cup final, this time losing over two legs to Shanghai Greenland Shenhua.

Lefundes did not renew his contract with the club, with the COVID pandemic directly affecting his professional future.

=== Botafogo ===
In 2020 he accepted the invitation of head coach Bruno Lazaroni to work at Botafogo in the Campeonato Brasileiro Série A, the highest level of Brazilian football.

== Managerial statistics ==
As of match played 19 September 2026

Managerial record by team and tenure
Team	Nat.	From	To	Record					Ref.
Team	Nat.	From	To	G	W	D	L	Win %	Ref.
Jeonbuk Hyundai Motors (interim)	(South Korea)	20 December 2012	1 June 2013	22	9	7	6	40.91	
Madura United	(Indonesia)	15 November 2021	5 March 2023	53	21	13	19	39.62	
Persita Tangerang	(Indonesia)	1 July 2024	30 May 2025	34	12	7	15	35.29	
Borneo Samarinda	(Indonesia)	15 June 2025	7 June 2026	34	25	4	5	73.53	
Java United	(Indonesia)	9 August 2026	Present	3	0	1	2	0.00	
Career Total				146	67	32	47	45.89	

== Honours ==
Individual

- Super League Coach of the Month: September 2025, April 2026
