= Jack Alan Brown =

Indonesian footballer

Jack Brown
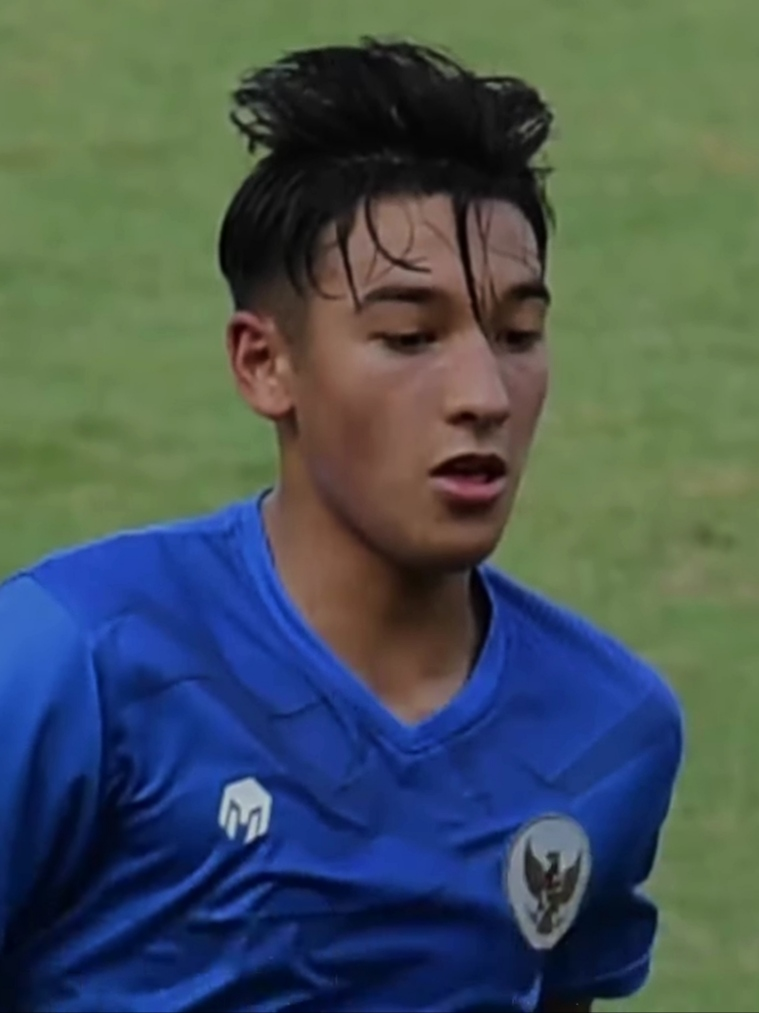
- Brown training with Indonesia U20 in 2020

Personal information
- Full name: Jack Alan Brown
- Date of birth: 2 November 2001 (age 25)
- Place of birth: Jakarta, Indonesia
- Height: 1.75 m (5 ft 9 in)
- Positions: Attacking midfielder; winger

Team information
- Current team: PSIS Semarang
- Number: 90

Youth career
- Arsenal Soccer School Indonesia
- 2019–2021: Lincoln City

Senior career*
Years	Team	Apps	(Gls)
2021–2026	Persita Tangerang	36	(1)
2026–	PSIS Semarang	2	(0)

International career
2020	Indonesia U20	3	(2)
- * Club domestic league appearances and goals as of 17 October 2026

Jack Alan Brown (born 2 November 2001) is an Indonesian professional footballer who plays as an attacking midfielder or winger for Championship club PSIS Semarang.

== Club career ==
=== Persita Tangerang ===
He was signed for Persita Tangerang to play in Liga 1 in the 2021 season. Brown made his league debut in a 3–0 win against Persiraja Banda Aceh on 6 February 2022 as a substitute for Ricki Ariansyah in the 88th minute at the Kompyang Sujana Stadium, Denpasar.

On 13 March 2024, Brown scored his first goal for the club, against Arema in a 4–3 win.

== International career ==
In August 2020, Brown was included on Indonesia national under-19 football team 30-man list for Training Center in Croatia. He earned his first under-19 cap on 25 September 2020 in a 0–1 loss against Bosnia and Herzegovina U19. On 11 October 2020, Brown scored a brace for the youth team in a 4–1 win against North Macedonia U19.

== Personal life ==
Brown was born and raised in Jakarta to an English father and an Indonesian mother. He started his football education in Arsenal Soccer School Indonesia. His brother George is also a professional footballer.

== Career statistics ==
As of 17 October 2026

Appearances and goals by club, season and competition
Club	Season	League			National cup		Other		Total	
Club	Season	Division	Apps	Goals	Apps	Goals	Apps	Goals	Apps	Goals
Persita Tangerang	2021	Liga 1	6	0	0	0	0	0	6	0
Persita Tangerang	2022–23	Liga 1	0	0	0	0	0	0	0	0
Persita Tangerang	2023–24	Liga 1	9	1	0	0	0	0	9	1
Persita Tangerang	2024–25	Liga 1	18	0	0	0	0	0	18	0
Persita Tangerang	2025–26	Super League	3	0	0	0	0	0	3	0
PSIS Semarang	2026–27	Championship	2	0	0	0	0	0	2	0
Career total			38	1	0	0	0	0	38	1
