= Ghobeiry =

Ghobeiry غبيري
- Municipality
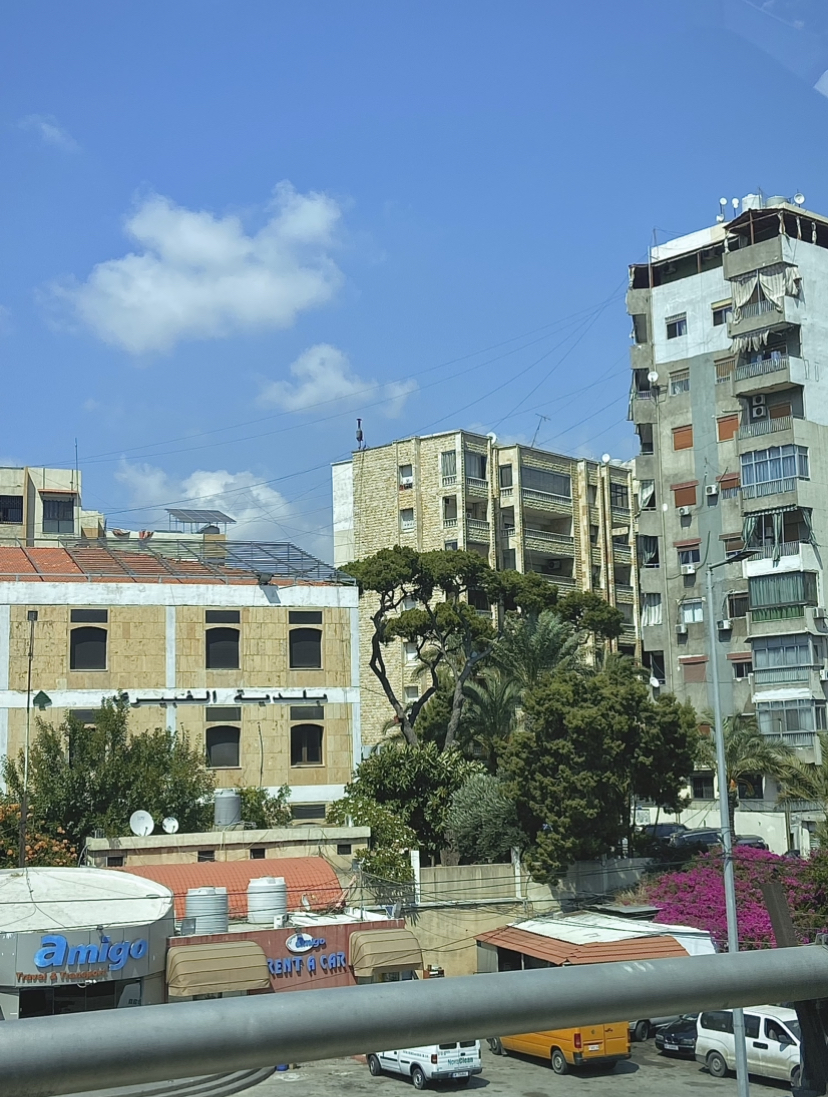
- A street in Ghobeiry
- Interactive map of Ghobeiry
- Location in Lebanon
- Coordinates: 33°51′32″N 35°30′15″E
- Country: Lebanon
- Governorate: Mount Lebanon
- District: Baabda

Area
  - Total: 120 ha (300 acres)
- Elevation: 50 m (160 ft)
- Time zone: UTC+2 (EET)
  - Summer (DST): UTC+3 (EEST)

Ghobeiry (Arabic: غبيري; also spelled Ghbayreh or Ghabariyeh) is a municipality in the Baabda District of Mount Lebanon Governorate, Lebanon.

The inhabitants of Ghobeiry are predominantly Shia Muslims.

In May 1988, following three weeks of intense fighting between Amal and Hezbollah, Ghobeiry and Chiyah were the only districts of Beirut that Amal was able to retain control of, the rest of Southern Beirut coming under Hizbullah control.

Together with several neighboring towns and municipalities, including Haret Hreik, Ghobeiry makes up the southern suburb of Beiruts, called Dahieh. It is the biggest Municipality in Lebanon.

== Demographics ==
Religion in Ghobeiry (2014)
Religion	Percent
Shia Islam	79.14%
Sunni Islam	20.26%
Others	0.60%

In 2014, Muslims made up 99.41% of registered voters in Ghobeiry. 79.14% of the voters were Shiite Muslims and 20.26% were Sunni Muslims.

== Notable residents ==
- Mustafa Badreddine (1961–2016), former Hezbollah member
- Mohamad Ali El Husseini (born 1974), former Hezbollah member
- Mohamad Baker El Housseini (born 2002), footballer
- Hasan Farhat (born 2004), footballer
