= Mariano Peralta =

Argentine footballer (born 1998)

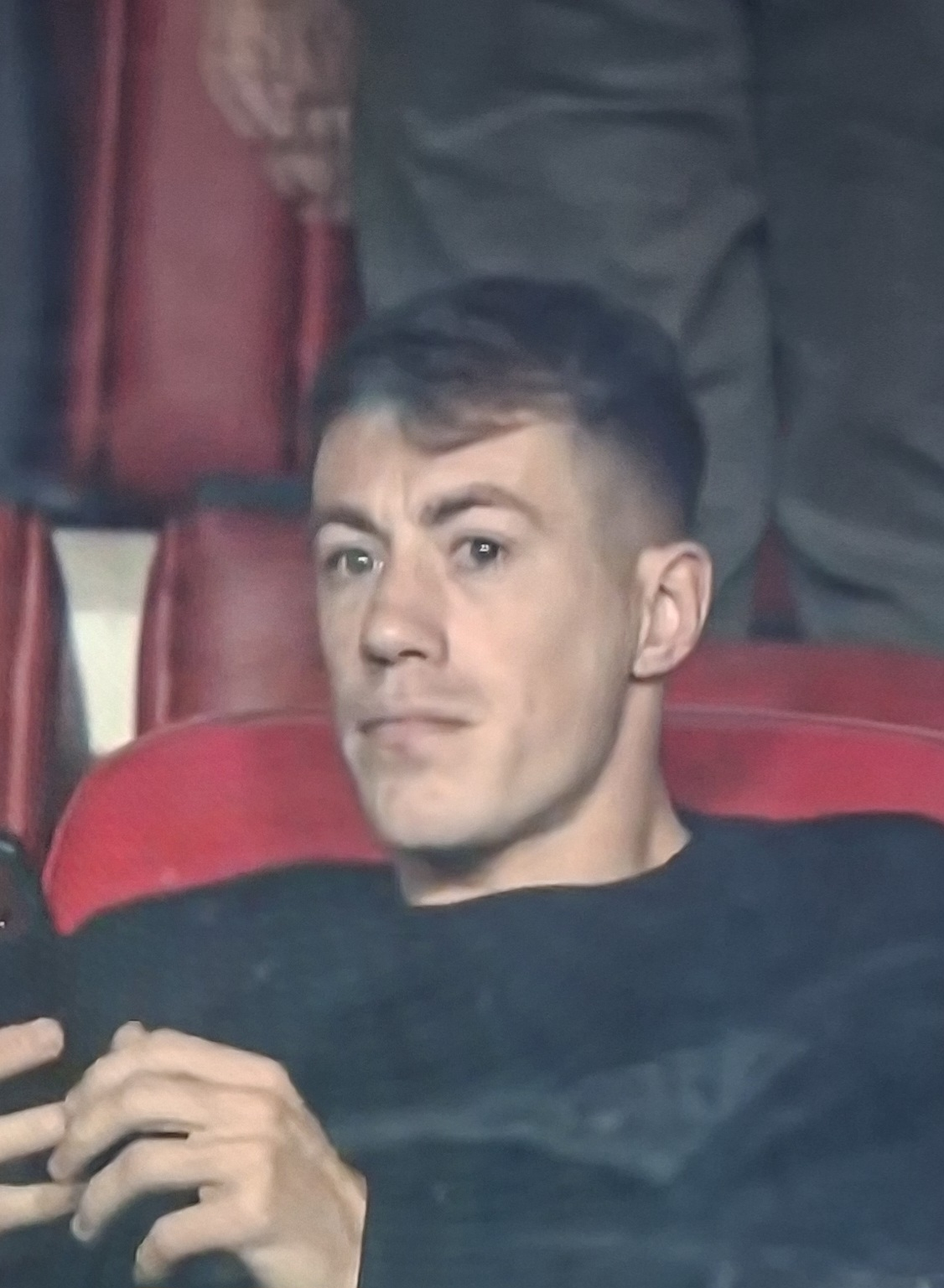

Personal information
- Full name: Mariano Ezequiel Peralta Bauer
- Date of birth: 20 February 1998 (age 28)
- Place of birth: Adrogué, Argentina
- Height: 1.80 m (5 ft 11 in)
- Position: Winger

Team information
- Current team: Persib Bandung
- Number: 10

Youth career
- –2019: San Lorenzo

Senior career*
Years	Team	Apps	(Gls)
2020–2023	San Lorenzo	24	(2)
2022	→ Unión (loan)	31	(2)
2023–2024	Cerro	33	(3)
2024–2026	Borneo Samarinda	67	(29)
2026–	Persib Bandung	8	(2)
- * Club domestic league appearances and goals as of 1 November 2026

Mariano Ezequiel Peralta Bauer (born 20 February 1998) is an Argentine professional footballer who plays as a winger for Super League club Persib Bandung.

== Professional career ==
On 11 September 2018, Peralta signed his first professional contract with San Lorenzo. He made his professional debut with San Lorenzo in a 3-1 Liga Profesional de Fútbol win over Aldosivi on 1 March 2020. On 15 February 2022, Peralta joined Unión on a loan deal until the end of 2022 with a purchase option in June for US$700,000 and in December for US$900,000.

== Honours ==
Persib Bandung

- Piala Presiden runner-up: 2026

Individual

- Super League Best Player: 2025–26
- Super League Best XI: 2025–26
- Super League Team of the Season: 2024–25, 2025–26
- Super League Player of the Month: November 2025, April 2026, May 2026
- Super League Goal of the Month: September 2024, March 2026
- APPI Indonesian Football Award Best XI: 2025–26
- APPI Indonesian Football Award Best Footballer: 2025–26
