= Alex Tanque =

Brazilian professional football player

Personal information
- Full name: Alex de Aguiar Gomes
- Date of birth: 14 April 1994 (age 32)
- Place of birth: Cubatão, Brazil
- Height: 1.87 m (6 ft 2 in)
- Position: Forward

Team information
- Current team: Valletta

Youth career
- 2013: São Vicente

Senior career*
Years	Team	Apps	(Gls)
2014	Guarujá	9	(2)
2014–2015	Jabaquara	24	(1)
2016–2017	Boca Júnior	24	(7)
2016	→ Sergipe (loan)	0	(0)
2018	Democrata	4	(0)
2019	Igrejinha	12	(4)
2019–2020	Coimbrões	27	(7)
2020–2021	Canelas 2010	27	(14)
2021–2022	Zagłębie Sosnowiec	19	(1)
2022	Sagrada Esperança	5	(0)
2023–2024	Canelas 2010	36	(16)
2024–2025	Marsaxlokk	31	(16)
2025–2026	PSM Makassar	29	(6)
2026–	Valletta	0	(0)
- * Club domestic league appearances and goals as of 9 May 2026

Alex de Aguiar Gomes (born 14 April 1994) commonly known as Alex Tanque, is a Brazilian professional footballer who plays as a forward for Maltese Premier League club Valletta.

== Club career ==
Born in Cubatão, São Paulo, Brazil, he joined several local Brazilian clubs. And decided to go abroad for the first time to Portugal with joined Coimbrões in 2019 and joined Canelas 2010 in 2020.

Ahead of 2021–22 season, Alex moved to Poland signed two-years contract with Zagłębie Sosnowiec. On 1 August 2021, he scored his first league goal for the club in his debut match against Arka Gdynia despite draw 1–1.

=== Marsaxlokk ===
In 2024, Alex joined Maltese Premier League club Marsaxlokk. Alex made his debut on 12 July 2024, in a 1–1 draw to Partizani Tirana in the 2024–25 UEFA Conference League qualifying. Subsequently on 18 August 2024, Alex made his Maltese Premier League debut for Marsaxlokk in a home match against Gzira United in a 0–1 lose, he was starter and playing full 90 minutes. On 25 August 2024, he scored his first goal for Marsaxlokk in the 63rd minute of a 1–2 home lose against Melita. On 28 September 2024, Alex scored the winning goal for the club in a 2–1 home win against Balzan, with the result, Marsaxlokk claimed their first three points as they turned defeat into victory.

On 19 January 2025, he scored a brace for the club in a 3–1 home win against Żabbar St. Patrick. On 12 June 2025, Alex announced officially that he would leave Marsaxlokk after one season.

=== PSM Makassar ===
On 4 July 2025, Indonesian club PSM Makassar announced the signing of Alex.
