= Mohamad Baker El Housseini =

Lebanese footballer (born 2002)

- El Housseini with Lebanon in 2024

Personal information
- Full name: Mohamad Baker Ali El Housseini
- Date of birth: 18 December 2002 (age 23)
- Place of birth: Ghobeiry, Lebanon
- Height: 1.80 m (5 ft 11 in)
- Position: Centre-back

Senior career*
Years	Team	Apps	(Gls)
2020–2024	Ahed	7	(0)
2021–2022	→ Shabab Bourj (loan)	9	(1)
2022–2023	→ Safa (loan)	15	(0)
2023–2024	→ Bourj (loan)	18	(1)
2024	Al-Najma	0	(0)
2024–2025	Al-Quwa Al-Jawiya	4	(0)
2025–2026	Borneo Samarinda	13	(0)
2026	Hatta	3	(0)

International career^{‡}
2022–2023	Lebanon U23	5	(0)
2022–2025	Lebanon	3	(0)
- * Club domestic league appearances and goals as of 19 September 2026 ‡ National team caps and goals as of 8 September 2025

Mohamad Baker Ali El Housseini (Arabic: محمد باقر علي الحسيني; born 18 December 2002) is a Lebanese professional footballer who plays as a centre-back.

== Club career ==
El Housseini made his debut for Ahed during the 2020–21 Lebanese Premier League season. He was loaned to Shabab Bourj during the 2021–22 season. On 15 July 2022, El Housseini moved to Safa on loan for one year, and on 30 May 2023, he joined Bourj on a one-year loan, returning to Ahed in June 2024.

El Housseini moved to Bahraini Premier League side Al-Najma in August 2024. He joined Al-Quwa Al-Jawiya in the Iraq Stars League in December 2024. On 25 June 2025, El Housseini officially signed for Indonesian Super League club Borneo Samarinda; he left by mutual consent on 20 July 2026.

On 22 July 2026, El Housseini moved to Hatta in the UAE Pro League. He made his debut on 16 August 2026, in a 2–0 defeat to Al Jazira; despite the loss, El Housseini was praised for his defensive performance. El Housseini terminated his contract with Hatta in October 2026, after only three months, making four appearances for the team.

== International career ==
El Housseini played for Lebanon at under-23 level, taking part in the 2023 WAFF Championship. He made his debut for the senior team on 30 December 2022, in a 1–0 friendly defeat to the United Arab Emirates.

== Career statistics ==
=== Club ===
As of match played 19 September 2026

Appearances and goals by club, season and competition
Club	Season	League			National cup (Note: Includes Lebanese FA Cup, King's Cup (Bahrain), Iraq FA Cup, Piala Indonesia)		League cup (Note: Includes Lebanese Challenge Cup, Khalid Bin Hamad Cup, UAE League Cup)		Other		Total	
Club	Season	Division	Apps	Goals	Apps	Goals	Apps	Goals	Apps	Goals	Apps	Goals
Ahed	2020–21	Lebanese Premier League	7	0	0	0	—		—		7	0
Shabab Bourj (loan)	2021–22	Lebanese Premier League	9	1	2	1	2	0	—		13	2
Safa (loan)	2022–23	Lebanese Premier League	15	0	1	0	4	0	—		20	0
Bourj (loan)	2023–24	Lebanese Premier League	18	1	0	0	—		2 (Note: Appearances in Arab Club Champions Cup)	0	20	1
Al-Najma	2024–25	Bahraini Premier League	0	0	—		—		—		0	0
Al-Quwa Al-Jawiya	2024–25	Iraq Stars League	4	0	0	0	—		—		4	0
Borneo Samarinda	2025–26	Indonesian Super League	13	0	—		—		—		13	0
Hatta	2026–27	UAE Pro League	3	0	—		1	0	—		4	0
Career total			69	2	3	1	7	0	2	0	81	3

=== International ===
As of match played 8 September 2025

Appearances and goals by national team and year
National team	Year	Apps	Goals
Lebanon	2022	1	0
Lebanon	2023	1	0
Lebanon	2024	0	0
Lebanon	2025	1	0
Total		3	0
