= Rodrigo Moura =

Brazilian footballer

Personal information
- Full name: Rodrigo Moura do Nascimento
- Date of birth: 25 January 1996 (age 30)
- Place of birth: Brasília, Brazil
- Height: 1.98 m (6 ft 6 in)
- Position: Goalkeeper

Team information
- Current team: Chaves
- Number: 31

Youth career
- 2013–2015: Athletico Paranaense

Senior career*
Years	Team	Apps	(Gls)
2015–2020	Vilafranquense	34	(0)
2019–2020	→ Olhanense (loan)	21	(0)
2020–2021	Águeda	22	(0)
2021–2022	Trofense	22	(0)
2022–	Chaves	13	(0)
2023	→ Pedras Salgadas (loan)	1	(0)
2025–2026	→ Persijap Jepara (loan)	11	(0)
2026	→ Casa Pia (loan)	0	(0)
- * Club domestic league appearances and goals as of 30 August 2026

Rodrigo Moura do Nascimento (born 25 January 1996) is a Brazilian professional footballer who plays as a goalkeeper for Liga Portugal 2 club Chaves.

== Professional career ==
A youth product of the Brazilian club Athletico Paranaense, Moura began his senior career with the Portuguese club Vilafranquense. He moved to Olhanense on loan for the 2019–20 season. He followed that up with a stint with Águeda the following season, before moving to the Liga Portugal 2 with Trofense in 2021.

Moura transferred to Chaves on 29 June 2022, as they were newly promoted to the Primeira Liga. In the summer of 2025, he was sent on a season-long loan to Indonesian Super League club Persijap Jepara. On 2 February 2026, he joined Primeira Liga side Casa Pia on loan until the end of the season.

== Honours ==
Individual

- Super League Save of the Month: September 2025
