= George Brown (footballer, born 1999) =

English footballer

Personal information
- Full name: George Peter Brown
- Date of birth: 4 June 1999 (age 27)
- Place of birth: London, England
- Height: 1.79 m (5 ft 10 in)
- Position: Full-back

Team information
- Current team: Bhayangkara

Youth career
- Hutton
- Brentwood Athletic

College career
Years	Team	Apps	(Gls)
2017–2021	Ashland Eagles	57	(2)

Senior career*
Years	Team	Apps	(Gls)
2023–2024	Persebaya Surabaya	6	(0)
2023–2024	→ Persipal Palu (loan)	2	(0)
2024–2025	Persita Tangerang	4	(0)
2025–2026	PSBS Biak	14	(0)
2026–	Bhayangkara	0	(0)
- * Club domestic league appearances and goals as of 15:22, 28 July 2026 (UTC)

George Peter Brown (born 4 June 1999) is an English professional footballer who plays as a full-back for Indonesian Super League club Bhayangkara.

== Club career ==
=== Early career ===
Growing up, Brown played youth football for Hutton and Brentwood Athletic. In 2017, he enrolled at Ashland University in the United States and played college football for five seasons.

In December 2022, Brown signed a two-year deal with Liga 1 side Persebaya Surabaya. On 18 January 2023, he made his professional debut as a substitute in a 5–0 win over Persita. On 15 November 2023, Brown was released by the club. Despite having previously been announced as released from his contract at Persebaya, later that month, he was revealed as a loan signing for Liga 2 side Persipal Palu. On 10 December 2023, he made his league debut for Persipal in a 2–0 defeat to Persiba Balikpapan.

In July 2026, Brown signed for Bhayangkara.

== International career ==
In September 2023, Brown earned his first call-up to the Indonesia U23 squad for the 2022 Asian Games.

== Personal life ==
Brown was born in England to an English father and Indonesian mother. His brother is fellow footballer Jack Brown. He attended Brentwood School in Essex growing up.
