= Kadú (Angolan footballer) =

Angolan footballer

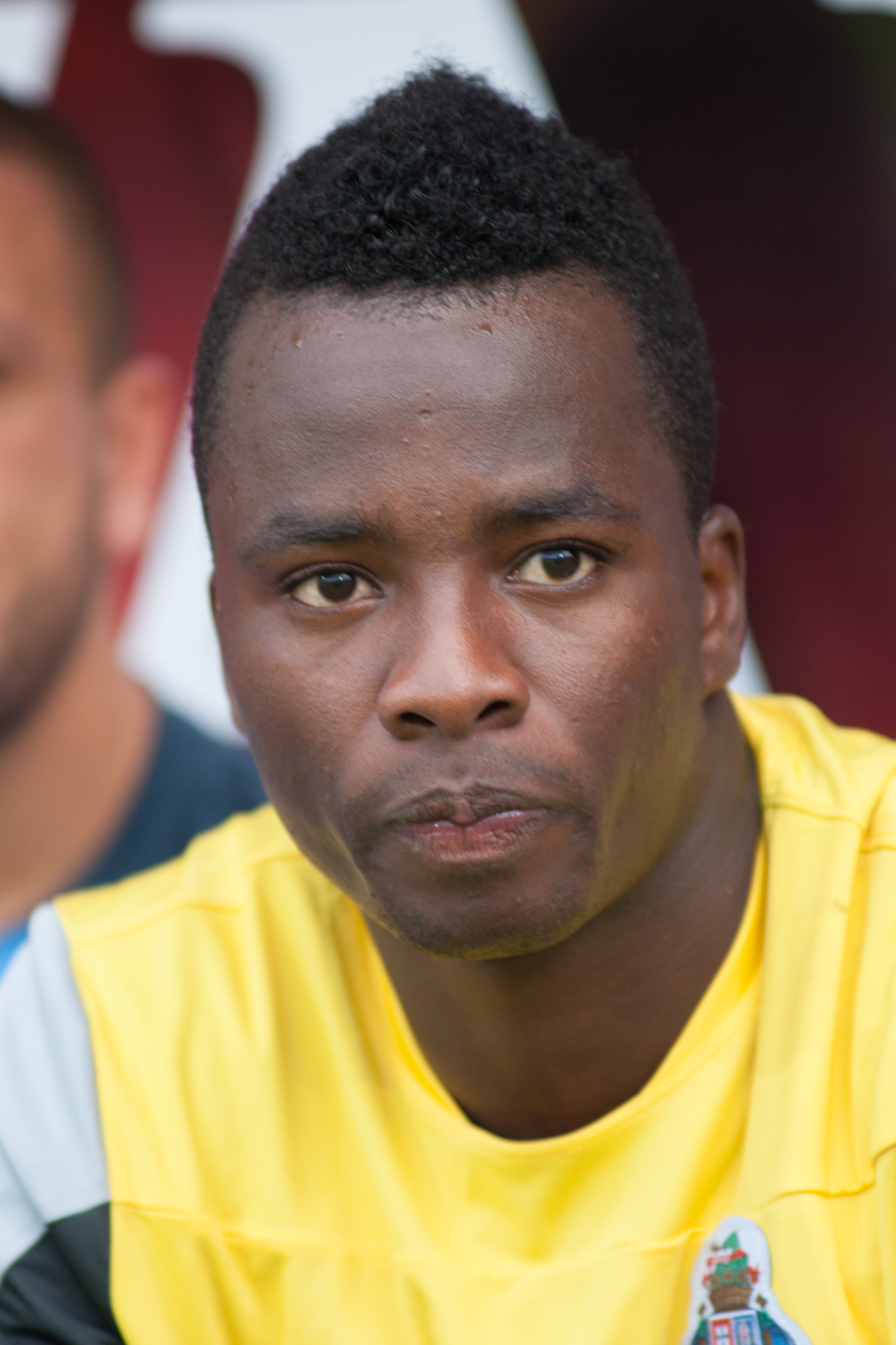
- Kadú with Porto in 2013

Personal information
- Full name: Aldo Geraldo Manuel Monteiro
- Date of birth: 30 November 1994 (age 31)
- Place of birth: Porto Amboim, Angola
- Height: 1.90 m (6 ft 3 in)
- Position: Goalkeeper

Team information
- Current team: Borneo Samarinda
- Number: 41

Youth career
- 2007–2008: Arrentela
- 2008–2009: Belenenses
- 2009–2013: Porto
- 2009–2010: → Padroense (loan)

Senior career*
Years	Team	Apps	(Gls)
2012–2014	Porto	1	(0)
2013–2015	Porto B	45	(0)
2015–2016	→ Varzim (loan)	8	(0)
2016–2017	Trofense	11	(0)
2017–2019	Oliveirense	11	(0)
2019–2021	Espinho	28	(0)
2021–2022	Oliveirense	13	(0)
2022–2023	Alverca	24	(0)
2023–2024	Oliveira Hospital	19	(0)
2024–2025	Sagrada Esperança		
2025–2026	PSBS Biak	26	(0)
2026–	Borneo Samarinda	1	(0)

International career
2021–2023	Angola	3	(0)
- * Club domestic league appearances and goals as of 5 September 2026

Aldo Geraldo Manuel Monteiro (born 30 November 1994), commonly known as Kadú, is an Angolan professional footballer who plays as a goalkeeper for Super League club Borneo Samarinda.

He debuted in 2011 for Porto as the youngest player in the club's history at 16, playing once each in the Taça de Portugal and Primeira Liga, but spent most of his career in Portugal's lower divisions. He made his senior international debut for Angola in 2021.

== Club career ==
Kadú was born in Porto Amboim. He moved to Portugal in his early teens, playing for four youth clubs and finishing his formation with FC Porto, who also loaned him to Padroense F.C. who acted as the farm team in 2009. On 15 October 2011, the 16-year-old debuted as the youngest player in the club's history, taking the record from Sérgio Oliveira; the game was an 8–0 win at C.A. Pêro Pinheiro in the third round of the Taça de Portugal, as an 82nd-minute substitute for Rafael Bracali. The following 12 May, in the last day of the season and as the side had already been crowned national champions, he made his Primeira Liga debut as a replacement for the same player in a 5–2 away win against Rio Ave FC.

In August 2015, after two full seasons with the reserves in the Segunda Liga, often as starter, Kadú joined Varzim S.C. of the same league on loan. After spending 2016–17 with C.D. Trofense in the third division he signed for U.D. Oliveirense, recently promoted to the second tier.

Kadú spent the ensuing years from 2019 in division three, representing S.C. Espinho, Oliveirense again, F.C. Alverca and F.C. Oliveira do Hospital.

== International career ==
Kadú was called up by Angola squad in September 2020. He only made his debut one year later, however, replacing Hugo Marques who had just been diagnosed with COVID-19 prior to the 0–1 home loss to Libya for the 2022 FIFA World Cup qualifiers.

== Honours ==
Porto

- Primeira Liga: 2011–12
