= Divaldo Alves =

Portuguese football manager

Personal information
- Full name: Divaldo Da Silva Teixeira Alves
- Date of birth: 12 August 1978 (age 48)
- Place of birth: Luanda, Angola

Team information
- Current team: G.D. Interclube (head coach)

Managerial career
- Years: Team
- 2000–2002: Atlético do Cacém
- 2004–2005: EAS Olivais
- 2005–2007: Algueirão
- 2008–2009: PSMS Medan
- 2010: Persijap Jepara
- 2010–2011: Minangkabau
- 2011–2012: Persebaya 1927
- 2012–2013: Negeri Sembilan
- 2014: Perak
- 2015: Kruoja Pakruojis (Deputy treasurer)
- 2015–2018: Muscat Club
- 2019–2020: Sofapaka
- 2022–2023: Persik Kediri
- 2023–2024: Persita Tangerang
- 2025: Persik Kediri
- 2025: PSBS Biak
- 2025–2026: Persijap Jepara
- 2026: Persijap Jepara (Technical director)
- 2026–: G.D. Interclube

Divaldo Da Silva Teixeira Alves is a Portuguese football manager, who is the technical director of Liga 1 club Persijap Jepara. He is a UEFA Pro Licence holder.

== Personal life ==
Besides his native Portuguese, Alves is also fluent in Indonesian, Malay, English, and Spanish.

== Managerial career ==
A former youth coach and scout at Benfica also youth coach at Atlético do Cacém and Encarnação Olivais Senior team, Alves success came in Indonesia where he first worked as assistant coach of PSMS Medan in 2009, as the club qualified to the quarter-finals of the 2009 AFC Cup and semi-finals of 2009 Copa Indonesia. Alves later coached Persebaya 1927 to second place in the 2011-12 Indonesia Premier League he holds the LPI national record with 10 consecutive matches with 2 draws and 8 wins. He also coached Persijap Jepara and Minangkabau staying 3 points from the second position in LPI competition, working with low profile players, Minangkabau was a club named PSP Padang.

In early 2013 Alves was named as the coach of the Malaysia Super League club Negeri Sembilan. However, he left the club in a mutual agreement in May 2013, before end of season.

Alves was appointed as Technical Advisor of Perak in June 2014, succeeding Karl-Heinz Weigang. His role is to work together with head coach Abu Bakar Fadzim in handling the Perak's first team squad. as technical advisor and head coach in September 2014. Season 2017–2018 in Oman the club ended top 6, after Coach Divaldo Alves went out of professional football for one season for private reasons. Manager Divaldo Alves has new challenge this time in West of Africa, sign for Sofapaka for the coming season 2019/2020 and the objective is to achieve the top of the table of Kenyan Premier League.

== Managerial statistics ==
As of 16 February 2026

Managerial record by team and tenure
Team	Nat.	From	To	Record					Ref.
Team	Nat.	From	To	G	W	D	L	Win %	Ref.
Persik Kediri	(Indonesia)	27 August 2022	14 April 2023	27	12	7	8	44.44	
Persita Tangerang	(Indonesia)	12 September 2023	30 March 2024	19	5	6	8	26.32	
Persik Kediri	(Indonesia)	23 March 2025	14 June 2025	7	1	3	3	14.29	
PSBS Biak	(Indonesia)	1 July 2025	9 December 2025	13	3	3	7	23.08	
Persijap Jepara	(Indonesia)	19 December 2025	16 February 2026	8	2	1	5	25.00	
Career Total				74	23	20	31	31.08	

== Honours ==
Persebaya Surabaya

- Malaysia-Indonesia Unity Cup: 2011
- Indonesia Premier League
  - Runner-Up: 2011–12

Individual

- Liga 1 Coach of the Month: March 2023
