= Rivaldo Pakpahan =

Indonesian footballer (born 2003)

Personal information
- Full name: Rivaldo Enero Pakpahan
- Date of birth: 20 January 2003 (age 23)
- Place of birth: North Tapanuli, Indonesia
- Height: 1.72 m (5 ft 8 in)
- Position: Defensive midfielder

Team information
- Current team: Borneo Samarinda
- Number: 50

Youth career
- SSB Siborongborong
- PPLP Sumatera Utara
- –2021: Kalteng Putra
- 2021–2022: Borneo Samarinda

Senior career*
Years	Team	Apps	(Gls)
2022–	Borneo Samarinda	60	(0)
2022–2023	→ Serpong City (loan)	7	(1)

International career^{‡}
2025	Indonesia U23	5	(0)
2024–	Indonesia	1	(0)
- * Club domestic league appearances and goals as of 17 May 2026 ‡ National team caps and goals as of 8 December 2025

Rivaldo Enero Pakpahan (born 20 January 2003) is an Indonesian professional footballer who plays as a defensive midfielder for Super League club Borneo Samarinda and the Indonesia national team.

== International career ==
On 25 November 2024, Rivaldo received a call up to the preliminary squad to the Indonesia national team for the 2024 ASEAN Championship. On 15 December 2024, he made his debut against Vietnam in a 1–0 lost.

== Career statistics ==
=== International ===
As of match played 15 December 2024

Appearances and goals by national team and year
National team	Year	Apps	Goals
Indonesia	2024	1	0
Total		1	0

== Honours ==
Borneo Samarinda

- Piala Presiden runner-up: 2024

Individual

- Super League Young Player of the Month: November 2025
