= Juan Villa =

Colombian footballer (born 1999)

Personal information
- Full name: Juan Felipe Villa Ruiz
- Date of birth: 10 October 1999 (age 27)
- Place of birth: El Bagre, Colombia
- Height: 1.77 m (5 ft 10 in)
- Position: Attacking midfielder

Team information
- Current team: Borneo Samarinda
- Number: 10

Youth career
- Liga Antioqueña
- –2018: Gil Vicente

Senior career*
Years	Team	Apps	(Gls)
2018–2021	Gil Vicente	34	(6)
2020	→ Fafe (loan)	8	(0)
2021	→ Berço SC (loan)	8	(2)
2021–2022	Apollon Larissa	29	(2)
2023–2025	América de Quito	34	(10)
2024	→ Envigado (loan)	28	(2)
2025	Al-Ahli Club	2	(3)
2025–	Borneo Samarinda	31	(13)
- * Club domestic league appearances and goals as of 23 May 2026

Juan Felipe Villa Ruiz (born 10 October 1999) is a Colombian professional footballer who plays as an attacking midfielder for Super League club Borneo Samarinda.

== Career ==
Villa made his professional debut with Gil Vicente in a 0-0 Primeira Liga tie with Boavista on 22 September 2019. On 9 January 2020, Villa joined Fafe on loan for the rest of the season.

In March 2023, Villa joined Ecuadorian Serie B club América de Quito.

On 23 June 2025, Villa officially signed with Indonesian club Borneo Samarinda.

== Honours ==
Individual

- Super League Assist of the Month: August 2025
- Super League Player of the Month: September 2025
- Super League Best XI: 2025–26
- APPI Indonesian Football Award Best XI: 2025–26
- APPI Indonesian Football Award Best Midfielder: 2025–2026
