= Borneo F.C. Samarinda =

Association football team in Indonesia

Borneo
- Full name: Borneo Football Club
- Nickname: Pesut Etam (Our Dolphins)
- Short name: BOR
- Founded: 7 March 2014; 12 years ago as Pusamania Borneo
- Ground: Segiri Stadium
- Capacity: 13,000
- Owner: PT Nahusam Pratama Indonesia
- Chairman: Nabil Husein
- Manager: Dandri Dauri
- Coach: Sérgio Farias
- League: Indonesia Super League
- 2025–26: 2nd of 18
- Website: borneofc.id
Home colours	Away colours	Third colours

Borneo Football Club, commonly referred to as Borneo FC Samarinda, Borneo FC, or Borneo, is an Indonesian professional football club based in Samarinda, East Kalimantan. The club currently competes in Super League. The club's logo contains rage profile of Mahakam dolphin hence the nickname Pesut Etam, literally meaning "Our Dolphins" in local language.

== History ==
=== Beginning and breakthrough (2014–2021) ===
Borneo was formed by former Putra Samarinda supporters who were dissatisfied with their team's lack of achievements. PT Nahusam Pratama Indonesia bought Perseba Bangkalan on 7 March 2014, which gave them direct license to compete in the 2014 Liga Indonesia Premier Division, and changed their name to Pusamania Borneo Football Club.

==== First major honours (2014–2017) ====
After beating PSGC Ciamis on penalties in the 2014 Liga Indonesia Premier Division semi-finals, they were promoted to the Indonesia Super League. On 27 November 2014, Borneo won their first title by becoming champion of the 2014 Liga Indonesia Premier Division after beating Persiwa Wamena 2–1 in the final.

In the 2017 Piala Presiden, Borneo went on to defeat cup favourites, Persib 5–3 on penalties shootout in the semi-finals thus reaching their first cup final in the club history where Borneo faced off against Arema. However, Borneo suffered a 5–1 defeat to the opponent.

On April 2017, the club changed their name to Borneo Football Club. The club then went on to signed New Zealand national star Shane Smeltz for the 2017 season and then managed to signed former West Ham United and Real Madrid player Julien Faubert ahead of the 2018 season.

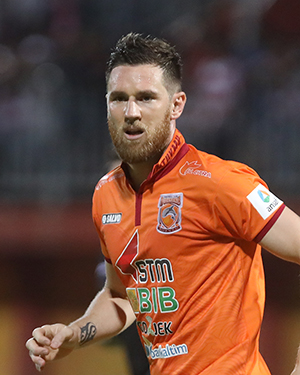
Shane Smeltz during his time with Borneo in 2017

=== Rebuilding project (2022–present) ===
In 2022, Borneo reached the 2022 Piala Presiden final but slipped away from winning the cup after a narrow 1–0 lost to Arema.

==== AFF competition debut (2024–2025) ====
In 2024, Borneo secured top of the table in the 2023–24 Liga 1 regular series with 70 points, but lost 2–4 on aggregate to Madura United in the championship series semi-finals. Nevertheless, Borneo were subsequently given Persija's spot in the 2024–25 ASEAN Club Championship, after the latter, who had qualified as 2022–23 Liga 1 runner-ups, declined to participate. Borneo also reached the 2024 Piala Presiden final facing off against Arema for the third time in the cup final in which again, Borneo lost 4–5 on penalties.

Borneo then competed in the 2024–25 ASEAN Club Championship which is their first official participation in international tournament. The club was then drawn in a group alongside Thai club Buriram United, Singaporean club Lion City Sailors, Malaysian club Kuala Lumpur City, Philippines club Kaya—Iloilo and Vietnamese club Công An Hà Nội. On 22 August 2024, Borneo won 3–0 against Lion City Sailors at home. After the conclusion of the group stage, Borneo manage to finished with 6 points but it wasn't enough to qualified to the knockout stage.

==== AFC competition debut (2026–present) ====
Borneo then finished the 2025–26 Indonesia Super League as runners-up which saw the club qualified to the 2026–27 AFC Challenge League and the 2026–27 ASEAN Club Championship. In the AFC Challenge League, Borneo was drawn in Group D alongside Myanmar club Yangon United, Philippines club One Taguig and Taiwanese club Tainan City.

== Team image ==
=== Crest and colours ===
Borneo Samarinda logo from its foundation until change for their 7th anniversary.

=== Supporters ===
Borneo's supporters are called Pusamania.

=== Derbies ===
- East Kalimantan derby is a match between Borneo and Persiba Balikpapan.
- Papadaan derby is a match between Borneo and Barito Putera.
- Mahakam derby is a match between Borneo and Mitra Kukar. The name of the match comes from the fact that Samarinda and Tenggarong are followed by the Mahakam River.

== Kit suppliers and shirt sponsors ==
Year	Kit manufacturer	Ref.
2014–2015	(Indonesia) Town	
2015–2017	(Indonesia) Salvo	
2018	(United States) Nike	
2019	(Indonesia) NH Project	
2020	(Indonesia) RIORS	
2021–2024	(Indonesia) Etams	
2024–2026	(Indonesia) SPECS	
2026–present	(Indonesia) Etams	

=== Sponsorship ===
Suzuki signed a two-year sponsorship deal with Borneo on 22 April 2014. On 2 May 2014, Bankaltim became their shirt sponsor for home and away matches.

== Stadium ==
Borneo new training centre that opened in 2023

Borneo plays its home matches at Segiri Stadium, located in Samarinda. The stadium has been the club's home ground since its establishment in 2014. In December 2023, Borneo temporarily relocated to Batakan Stadium in Balikpapan as Segiri Stadium underwent renovation. The renovation included improvements to the stands, roof, seating and playing surface. Following the completion of the renovation, Borneo returned to Segiri Stadium on 16 February 2025, when they hosted Barito Putera in a Liga 1 match.

=== Training ground ===
On 4 January 2023, Borneo began using its training centre in Sempaja. The facility was developed to support the club's first-team and youth development programmes, providing training pitches and supporting facilities for players. The training centre formed part of the club's efforts to improve its training infrastructure and develop young footballers in the region.

== Players ==
=== Current squad ===
As of 25 September 2026

Note: Flags indicate national team as defined under FIFA eligibility rules; some limited exceptions apply. Players may hold more than one non-FIFA nationality.

No.	Pos.	Nation	Player
2	DF	JPN	Rei Okada
6	MF	IDN	Ikhsan Zikrak
7	MF	BRA	Rodrigo Varanda
8	MF	ARG	Marcos Astina
9	FW	ESP	Rubio
10	MF	COL	Juan Villa (captain)
11	MF	IDN	Amar Brkić
12	DF	IDN	Rifad Marasabessy
15	MF	BRA	Sousa (on loan from Persija Jakarta)
16	DF	IDN	Komang Teguh
17	MF	IDN	Aan Redzuan
18	FW	IDN	Hugo Samir
19	FW	MLI	Moussa Diarra
20	GK	IDN	Muhammad Ridho
21	MF	IDN	Hermawan Widodo
23	DF	BRA	Caxambu
24	DF	IDN	Diego Michiels (vice-captain)
25	FW	IDN	Reyki Fariz
26	MF	IDN	Asgal Habib
27	GK	IDN	Andhika Setiawan
33	DF	IDN	Reva Adi Utama (on loan from PSIM Yogyakarta)
35	DF	BRA	Iago Mendonça

No.	Pos.	Nation	Player
36	MF	IDN	Aditya Warman
41	GK	ANG	Kadú
50	MF	IDN	Rivaldo Pakpahan
53	FW	FRA	Kablan N'Goma
55	MF	IDN	Dandy Sonriza
57	MF	IDN	Narendra Tegar
59	FW	IDN	Rangga Sumarna
65	MF	BRA	Gabriel Oliveira
66	MF	IDN	Dwiky Hardiansyah
68	FW	IDN	Habibi Jusuf
70	FW	BRA	Arthur Moura
77	DF	BRA	Christian Matheus
78	GK	IDN	Muhammad Darmawan
80	MF	BRA	Carlos Patrick
82	GK	IDN	Risnanda Rafa
87	DF	IDN	Achmad Figo
88	DF	IDN	Dika Kuswardani
89	DF	POL	Daniel Mikołajewski
94	FW	IDN	Dika Adi
95	DF	IDN	Ibrah Ohorella

=== Out on loan ===
Note: Flags indicate national team as defined under FIFA eligibility rules; some limited exceptions apply. Players may hold more than one non-FIFA nationality.

No.	Pos.	Nation	Player
—	GK	IDN	Rakasurya Handika (at Persijap Jepara)
—	DF	IDN	Jody Kurniady (at Kendal Tornado)
—	MF	RSA	Njabulo Blom (at Stellenbosch)
—	MF	IDN	Zico Salmon (at Kendal Tornado)
—	FW	IDN	Ousmane Maiket (at Kendal Tornado)

=== Naturalized players ===
Country	Player
Netherlands	Diego Michiels

== Management and staff ==
Position	Name
President	(Indonesia) Nabil Husein
CEO	(Indonesia) Ponaryo Astaman
Team manager	(Indonesia) Dandri Dauri
Head coach	(Brazil) Sergio Farias
Assistant coaches	(Brazil) Vinicius Xavier
Assistant coaches	(Paraguay) Pedro Velázquez
Assistant coaches	(Indonesia) Sultan Samma
Goalkeeper coach	(Brazil) Joao Gabriel
Physical coach	(Brazil) Joao Pedro Rayol
Analyst	(Indonesia) Gilang Ramadhan
Physiotherapists	(Brazil) Danilo Lima
Physiotherapists	(Indonesia) Fajar
Physiotherapists	(Indonesia) Ramdhan Pratama
Doctor	(Indonesia) Hilda Khoirun Nisa
Interpreter	Vacant

== Honours ==
=== Domestic ===
League

- Super League (level 1)
  - Runners-up (1): 2025–26
- Liga Indonesia Premier Division (level 2)
  - Champions (1): 2014

=== Other titles ===
- Piala Presiden
  - Runners-up (3): 2017, 2022, 2024
- Piala Gubernur Kaltim
  - Champions (1): 2016

== Award winners ==
=== Domestic ===
- Player of the Season
  - (Brazil) Renan Silva (2019)
  - (Argentina) Mariano Peralta (2025–26)
- League Golden Boot
  - (Brazil) Matheus Pato (2022–23)
- Goalkeeper of the Season
  - (Indonesia) Nadeo Argawinata (2025–26)
- Young Player of the Season
  - (Indonesia) Fajar Fathur Rahman (2023–24)
- Goal of the Season
  - (Brazil) Matheus Pato against Bali United on 3 April 2023. (2022–23)
- Team of the Season
  - (Uzbekistan) Javlon Guseynov (2019)
  - (Indonesia) Stefano Lilipaly (2022–23, 2023–24)
  - (Brazil) Matheus Pato (2022–23)
  - (Indonesia) Fajar Fathur Rahman (2023–24, 2024–25)
  - (Argentina) Mariano Peralta (2025–26)
  - (Indonesia) Nadeo Argawinata (2025–26)
  - (Colombia) Juan Villa (2025–26)

=== Others ===
- Fair Play Club
  - 2023–24, 2025–26

== Records and statistics ==
As of 9 October 2026.

Top 10 all-time appearances
Rank	Player	Years	Club appearances
1	(Indonesia) Terens Puhiri	2015–2025	240
2	(Indonesia) Muhammad Sihran	2017–2026	179
3	(Indonesia) Diego Michiels	2015–2021, 2022–present	156
4	(Indonesia) Nadeo Argawinata	2016–2019, 2023–2026	155
5	(Japan) Kei Hirose	2021–2026	155
6	(Indonesia) Leo Guntara	2021–2026	139
7	(Indonesia) Fajar Fathur Rahman	2020–2025	136
8	(Indonesia) Hendro Siswanto	2021–2025	117
9	(Indonesia) Lerby Eliandry	2016–2020	111
10	(Indonesia) Sultan Samma	2016–2023	109

Top 10 all-time scorers
Rank	Player	Club appearances	Total goals
1	(Brazil) Matheus Pato	61	40
2	(Indonesia) Lerby Eliandry	111	38
3	(Argentina) Mariano Peralta	69	30
4	(Indonesia) Stefano Lilipaly	108	29
4	(Indonesia) Terens Puhiri	240	29
6	(Argentina) Matías Conti	47	23
7	(Brazil) Francisco Torres	84	17
8	(Argentina) Felipe Cadenazzi	29	15
8	(Indonesia) Muhammad Sihran	179	15
10	(Colombia) Juan Villa	36	14

- Biggest wins: 7–1 vs Malut United (23 May 2026)
- Heaviest defeats: 0–6 vs Persija Jakarta (5 March 2019)
- Youngest ever debutant: Alfharezzi Buffon ~ 16 years 11 months 6 days old (On 3 April 2023 vs Bali United)
- Oldest ever player: Ponaryo Astaman ~ 41 years 1 month 17 days old (On 11 November 2017 vs Arema)
- Youngest goal scorers: Alfharezzi Buffon ~ 18 years 21 days old (On 19 May 2024 vs Madura United)
- Oldest goal scorers: (New Zealand) Shane Smeltz ~ 35 years 11 months 27 days old (On 25 September 2017 vs Persiba Balikpapan)

== Notable players ==
As of 2026–27 season.

=== International capped players ===
AFC/OFC.: (Kyrgyzstan) Azamat Baymatov; (Lebanon) Jad Noureddine; (Lebanon) Mohamad Baker El Housseini; (Myanmar) Win Naing Tun; (New Zealand) Shane Smeltz; (Syria) Mouhamad Anez; (Tajikistan) Nuriddin Davronov	CAF.: (Angola) Kadú; (Burundi) Christophe Nduwarugira; (Liberia) Erick Weeks Lewis; (Tunisia) Tijani Belaïd; (South Africa) Njabulo Blom	UEFA.: (Montenegro) Srđan Lopičić; (Poland) Daniel Mikołajewski	CONMEBOL/ CONCACAF.: (Argentina) Marcos Astina; (Brazil) Rodrigo Varanda; (Martinique) Julien Faubert; (Paraguay) Pedro Velázquez; (Uruguay) Juan Alsina

== Managerial history ==
Manager	Season	Honours
(Indonesia) Nus Yadera	2014	
(Indonesia) Iwan Setiawan	2014	– 2014 Liga Indonesia Premier Division
(Moldova) Iurie Arcan	2014–2015	
(Indonesia) Iwan Setiawan (2)	2015	
(Montenegro) Dragan Đukanović	2016–2017	
(Indonesia) Ricky Nelson	2017	
(Indonesia) Iwan Setiawan (3)	2017–2018	
(Serbia) Dejan Antonić	2018–2019	
(Italy) Fabio Lopez	2019	
(Argentina) Mario Gómez	2019	
(Brazil) Edson Tavares	2020	
(Argentina) Mario Gómez (2)	2020–2021	
(Bosnia and Herzegovina) Risto Vidaković	2021–2022	
(Indonesia) Fakhri Husaini	2022	
(Bosnia and Herzegovina) Milomir Šešlija	2022	
(Brazil) André Gaspar	2022–2023	
(Netherlands) Pieter Huistra	2023–2025	
(Spain) Joaquín Gómez	2025	
(Brazil) Fábio Lefundes	2025–2026	
(Portugal) Mauro Jerónimo	2026–present	

== Season by season record ==
Season	Division (Name)	Pos./Teams	Pl.	W	D	L	GS	GA	P	Piala Indonesia	ACLE	ACL 2	ACGL	ACC	Top Scorer (Goals)
2014	2nd (Divisi Utama)	1/(60)	28	14	5	5	41	19	56	Not held	-	-	-	-	(Argentina) Fernando Soler; 15
2015 season not finished	1st (ISL)	13/(18)	3	0	1	2	2	3	1	Not held	-	-	-	-	(Liberia) Erick Weeks (Montenegro) Srđan Lopičić; 1
2016 (Note: Not an official competition affiliated with PSSI, AFC & FIFA) unofficial league	1st (ISC A)	9/(18)	34	14	8	12	62	41	50	Not held	-	-	-	-	(Paraguay) Pedro Velázquez; 14
2017	1st (Liga 1)	8/(18)	34	15	7	12	50	39	52	Not held	-	-	-	-	(Indonesia) Lerby Eliandry; 16
2018	1st (Liga 1)	7/(18)	34	14	6	14	50	49	48	Semi-finals	-	-	-	-	(Argentina) Matías Conti; 11
2019	1st (Liga 1)	7/(18)	34	12	15	7	55	42	51	Not held	-	-	-	-	(Brazil) Renan Silva; 11
2020 season declared void	1st (Liga 1)	3/(18)	3	2	0	1	6	4	6	Not held	-	-	-	-	(Brazil) Francisico Torres; 2
2021–22	1st (Liga 1)	6/(18)	34	14	10	10	43	35	52	Not held	-	-	-	-	(Brazil) Francisico Torres; 15
2022–23	1st (Liga 1)	4/(18)	34	16	9	9	64	40	57	Not held	-	-	-	-	(Brazil) Matheus Pato; 25
2023–24	1st (Liga 1)	3/(18)	38	22	8	8	58	37	76	Not held	-	-	-	-	(Argentina) Felipe Cadenazzi; 15
2024–25	1st (Liga 1)	5/(18)	34	16	8	10	50	38	56	Not held	-	-	-	Group stage	(Argentina) Mariano Peralta; 10
2025–26	1st (Super League)	2/(18)	34	25	4	5	74	31	79	Not held	-	-	-	-	(Argentina) Mariano Peralta; 20
2026–27	1st (Super League)	/(18)	34							Not held	-	-	TBD	TBD	TBD

== Performance in AFC competitions ==
Season	Competition	Round	Nat	Club	Home	Away
2026–27	AFC Challenge League	Group D	(Myanmar)	Yangon United	2–0	
2026–27	AFC Challenge League	Group D	(Chinese Taipei)	Tainan City	1–3	
2026–27	AFC Challenge League	Quarter-finals	(Myanmar)	Shan United	18 Mar '27	11 Mar '27

== Performance in AFF competitions ==
Season	Competition	Round	Nat	Club	Home	Away
2024–25	ASEAN Club Championship	Group B	(Singapore)	Lion City Sailors	3–0	
2024–25	ASEAN Club Championship	Group B	(Malaysia)	Kuala Lumpur City		0–1
2024–25	ASEAN Club Championship	Group B	(Thailand)	Buriram United		0–4
2024–25	ASEAN Club Championship	Group B	(Philippines)	Kaya—Iloilo	2–1	
2024–25	ASEAN Club Championship	Group B	(Vietnam)	Cong An Ha Noi		2–3
2026–27	ASEAN Club Championship	Group A	(Thailand)	Buriram United		0–0
2026–27	ASEAN Club Championship	Group A	(Philippines)	Manila Digger	1–0	
2026–27	ASEAN Club Championship	Group A	(Malaysia)	Kuching City		9 Dec '26
2026–27	ASEAN Club Championship	Group A	(Thailand)	Ratchaburi	16 Dec '26	
2026–27	ASEAN Club Championship	Group A	(Vietnam)	Cong An Ho Chi Minh City		24 Feb '27
2026–27	ASEAN Club Championship	Group A	(Singapore)	Tampines Rovers	3 Mar '27	
