= Mohamad Ali El Husseini =

Saudi Arabian scholar and writer

- Title: Secretary-General of the Arab Islamic Council in Lebanon

Personal life
- Born: May 1, 1974 (age 52) Ghobeiry, Beirut, Lebanon
- Notable work(s): Towards a Moderate Islam, The Danger of Sectarian Conflicts and Ways to Confront Them
- Occupation: Islamic researcher, lecturer

Religious life
- Religion: Islam

Mohamad Ali El Husseini (born; 1 May 1974) is a Lebanese Shia Islamic researcher and lecturer who holds Saudi citizenship and is the current Secretary-General of the Arab Islamic Council in Lebanon. He has authored more than seventy books and is distinguished by his unifying intellectual and political positions calling for unity between Sunnis and Shiites. Among his publications are: Towards a Moderate Islam and The Danger of Sectarian Conflicts and Ways to Confront Them. He was a supporter of Hezbollah in its early days, but later became hostile to the party, adopting the Israeli point of view, and being accused several times of collaborating with Israel.

== Early life and education ==
Mohamad Ali El Husseini was born on 1 May 1974 in the village of Ghobeiry in the southern suburb of Beirut, Bir al-Abd district. He is considered one of the most prominent figures who advocate for unity between Sunnis and Shiites, through his participation in Islamic conferences and his call for open dialogue. He seeks to build bridges of trust between different sects, based on the premise that Islam is inclusive of all and that differences in jurisprudence should not lead to conflict. In addition to his role in unifying Islamic ranks, he has participated in numerous interfaith dialogues, calling for the importance of coexistence and tolerance among all divine religions and finding common ground between different religions to promote world peace.

He was sentenced to five years in prison by a Lebanese military court in 2012 on charges of attempting to communicate with Israel. While imprisoned in Roumieh Prison, Hosseini denied allegations of links to Israel, stressing the absence of evidence supporting the charges. He described his sentence as politically motivated, saying it was intended to appease Iran. However, before his sentencing, the Lebanese military court issued a decision on 10 August 2011, to suspend his trial due to the lack of evidence against him or any links to hostile states. Hezbollah appealed the decision, and the court sentenced him to prison and carried out the sentence.

== Views on the Gaza war and Israeli-Lebanese conflict ==
El Husseini is considered to have adopted views aligned with the Israel Defense Forces (IDF) regarding the conflicts in Gaza and Lebanon. He held the resistance responsible for the killing of civilians in Gaza, threatened Abu Obaida, the spokesman for the Qassam Brigades, and attacked Hezbollah, predicting that the IDF would continue targeting its leaders. In one of his interviews, he said that he believed the IDF more than the Lebanese Hezbollah. This comes in light of the killing of approximately 2,500 civilians in Lebanon and more than 42,000 Palestinians by Israel.

He expected the targeting of the former third general secretary of Hezbollah, Hassan Nasrallah, as he called him to write his will before it is too late, directing his speech to him: “Gather your inclusion and the covenant of your covenant and write your will ..”

== Saudi nationality ==
El-Hussaini was granted Saudi citizenship based on a royal order issued on 15 November 15, 2021. Al-Hussaini commented, saying: “I pledge to God Almighty that I will work hard, honestly, and sincerely to serve my great country, the Kingdom of Saudi Arabia. I owe love, loyalty, obedience, and allegiance to the leader of the nation’s march, my master, the Custodian of the Two Holy Mosques, King Salman bin Abdulaziz, and His Highness, my master, the Crown Prince, Prince Mohammed bin Salman, may God Almighty support them.”

== Literary works ==
- Thought and Religion in Vision 2030. Al Riyadh. 2022. Archived from the original on 2022-09-22.
- Islamic Unity Jurisprudence. The Arab Islamic Council. 2022. Archived from the original on 2023-03-31.
- And Remind with Hajj. The Arab Islamic Council. 2018. Archived from the original on 2023-05-28.
- Parliamentary Elections and Our National and Legal Responsibility. 2018.
- Towards a Moderate Islam. Al Gardenia. 2017. Archived from the original on 2022-09-22.
- The Authenticity of Moderation and Centrism in Islam (in Arabic). Al Bilad Press. 2017. Archived from the original on 2022-09-26.
- The Danger of Sectarian Conflicts and Ways to Address Them (in Arabic). Al Tibrah: World of Books. 2016. Archived from the original on 2022-09-22.
- Sunni and Shiites: The Common Ground. 2006.
