= 2024–25 Liga 1 (Indonesia) =

Liga 1
- Season: 2024–25
- Dates: 9 August 2024 – 24 May 2025
- Champions: Persib; 3rd Liga 1 title 9th Indonesian title
- Relegated: Barito Putera; PSIS; PSS
- AFC Champions League Two: Persib
- AFC Challenge League: Dewa United
- Matches: 306
- Goals: 809 (2.64 per match)
- Best player: Tyronne del Pino
- Top goalscorer: Alex Martins (26 goals)
- Biggest home win: Dewa United 6–0 Semen Padang (5 March 2025)
- Biggest away win: Semen Padang 1–8 Dewa United (25 October 2024)
- Highest scoring: Semen Padang 1–8 Dewa United (25 October 2024)
- Longest winning run: 6 matches Persib
- Longest unbeaten run: 18 matches Persib
- Longest winless run: 14 matches PSIS
- Longest losing run: 6 matches Madura United; PSS; PSIS
- Highest attendance: 39,395; Persija 1–1 Persebaya (12 April 2025)
- Lowest attendance: 0 Dewa United 2–2 Persib (19 August 2024); Dewa United 3–3 Madura United (21 September 2024); Dewa United 2–3 Persik (17 October 2024); Dewa United 2–1 Persija (8 February 2025); Arema 6–2 PSS (17 February 2025); PSM 1–0 Persija (23 February 2025); Arema 2–2 PSIS (24 February 2025); Arema 4–2 Barito Putera (13 March 2025) (excluding matches played behind closed doors)
- Total attendance: 1,518,611
- Average attendance: 4,918

The 2024–25 Liga 1 (also known as the 2024–25 BRI Liga 1 for sponsorship reasons) was the 8th season of Liga 1 under its current name and the 15th season of top-flight Indonesian football professional league since its establishment in 2008. This season is the first to use Video Assistant Referee (VAR) in the history of Indonesian football league.

The summer transfer window opened on Wednesday 12 June 2024 and closed on Tuesday 3 September 2024. Meanwhile, the winter window opened on Thursday 19 December 2024 and closed on Wednesday 15 January 2025.

Persib were the defending champions after defeating Madura United 6–1 on aggregate in the Championship Series final previous season.

== Overview ==
A total of eighteen teams will compete in the league – the fifteen teams from the previous season and three teams promoted from the Liga 2.

=== Teams relegated to Liga 2 ===
The first team to be relegated were Persikabo 1973 after losing 5–2 to Persik in an away match on 28 March 2024, ending their seven-years (previously as PS TNI) in the top division.

The second team to be relegated were Bhayangkara Presisi. Their rescue mission went short in Matchday 32 as relegation contender, Persita drew 1–1 against Persik. The result ensured Bhayangkara Presisi to be unable to break out of relegation. Their fate was sealed further after a 1–2 loss in their own match of the fixture against Bali United on 20 April 2024 and this result ended their seven-years in the top division.

The third and final team to be relegated were RANS Nusantara after losing 3–2 to PSM in an away match on 30 April 2024, ending their two-years in the top division.

==== Teams promoted from Liga 2 ====
The first two teams to earn promotion from Liga 2 were PSBS and Semen Padang, who were qualified to final round on 29 February 2024. PSBS defeated Persiraja 5–1 on aggregate and this was its first promotion to the top division, while Semen Padang defeated Malut United 2–1 on aggregate and returned to top division after five-years absence.

Malut United was the last to be promoted after defeating Persiraja on 3–2 aggregate at promotion play-off which was held on 9 March 2024. Just like PSBS, this is the first time Malut United will compete in the top division.

Starting from this season, Liga Indonesia Baru announced an increase in the foreign player quota to eight foreign players. However, every clubs can only register up to six of them on starting eleven for a single matchday squad and the other two can only come in to replace other foreign players.

=== Changes ===
▲ Promoted from Liga 2	▼ Relegated to Liga 2
PSBS; Semen Padang; Malut United	RANS Nusantara; Persikabo 1973; Bhayangkara Presisi

=== Teams by provinces ===
Rank	Province	Number	Teams
1	East Java	4	Arema, Madura United, Persebaya, and Persik
2	Banten	2	Dewa United and Persita
2	Central Java	2	Persis and PSIS
4	Bali	1	Bali United
4	East Kalimantan	1	Borneo Samarinda
4	Jakarta	1	Persija
4	North Maluku	1	Malut United
4	(Papua (province)) Papua	1	PSBS
4	South Kalimantan	1	Barito Putera
4	South Sulawesi	1	PSM
4	West Java	1	Persib
4	West Sumatra	1	Semen Padang
4	(Special Region of Yogyakarta) Yogyakarta	1	PSS

=== Locations and stadiums ===
Locations of non-Java and Madura-based 2024–25 Liga 1 teams
Locations of Java and Madura-based 2024–25 Liga 1 teams

Team	Location	Stadium	Capacity	2023–24 season
Arema	Malang	Kanjuruhan	21,603	15th
Arema	Malang	Gelora Soeprijadi, at Blitar (Note: Due to the ongoing renovation of the Kanjuruhan Stadium, Arema will play their home matches this season at the Gelora Soeprijadi Stadium in Blitar.)	15,000	15th
Bali United	Gianyar	Kapten I Wayan Dipta	18,000	4th
Barito Putera	Banjarmasin	Demang Lehman, at Banjarbaru	15,000	10th
Barito Putera	Banjarmasin	Sultan Agung, at Bantul (Note: Due to the ongoing renovation of the Demang Lehman Stadium, Barito Putera will play their home matches in the first half of the season at the Sultan Agung Stadium in Bantul.)	35,000	10th
Borneo Samarinda	Samarinda	Segiri Stadium	13,000	Liga 1 Third Place
Borneo Samarinda	Samarinda	Batakan, at Balikpapan (Note: Due to the ongoing renovation of the Segiri Stadium, Borneo Samarinda will play their home matches in the first half of the season at the Batakan Stadium in Balikpapan.)	40,000	Liga 1 Third Place
Dewa United	South Tangerang	Pakansari, at Bogor (Note: Due to the ongoing renovation of the Indomilk Arena, Dewa United will play their home matches this season at the Pakansari Stadium in Bogor. However they will play their first three home matches at the Kapten I Wayan Dipta Stadium in Gianyar.)	30,000	5th
Madura United	Pamekasan	Gelora Bangkalan, at Bangkalan (Note: Due to the ongoing renovation of the Gelora Ratu Pamelingan Stadium, Madura United will play their home matches this season at the Gelora Bangkalan Stadium in Bangkalan.)	13,500	Liga 1 Runner Up
Malut United	Sofifi	Gelora Kie Raha, at Ternate (Note: Due to the ongoing renovation of the Gelora Kie Raha Stadium, Malut United will play their first home match at the Madya Stadium in Central Jakarta. For their second to fourth home matches they will play at the Sultan Agung Stadium in Bantul.)	15,000	Promotion play-off winner
Persebaya	Surabaya	Gelora Bung Tomo	46,806	12th
Persib	Bandung	Gelora Bandung Lautan Api	38,000	Liga 1 Champion
Persib	Bandung	Jalak Harupat, at Bandung Regency	27,000	Liga 1 Champion
Persija	Jakarta	Jakarta International	82,000	8th
Persija	Jakarta	Gelora Bung Karno	77,200	8th
Persija	Jakarta	Pakansari, at Bogor	30,000	8th
Persik	Kediri	Brawijaya Stadium	20,000	9th
Persis	Surakarta	Manahan Stadium	20,000	7th
Persita	Tangerang	Pakansari, at Bogor (Note: Due to the ongoing renovation of the Indomilk Arena, Persita will play their home matches this season at the Pakansari Stadium in Bogor. However they will play their first four home matches at the Sultan Agung Stadium in Bantul.)	30,000	14th
PSBS	Biak Numfor	Lukas Enembe, at Jayapura (Note: Due to the lack of available stadiums in Biak, PSBS will play their home matches at the Lukas Enembe Stadium in Jayapura. However they will play their home matches in the first half of the season at the Kapten I Wayan Dipta Stadium in Gianyar.)	40,000	Liga 2 Champion
PSBS	Biak Numfor	Kapten I Wayan Dipta, at Gianyar	18,000	Liga 2 Champion
PSIS	Semarang	Jatidiri Stadium	18,000	6th
PSIS	Semarang	Moch. Soebroto, at Magelang (Note: Due to the ongoing renovation of the Jatidiri Stadium, PSIS will play their first six home matches at the Moch. Soebroto Stadium in Magelang.)	30,000	6th
PSM	Makassar	Gelora B.J. Habibie, at Parepare	8,500	11th
PSM	Makassar	Batakan, at Balikpapan (Note: Due to the ongoing renovation of the Gelora B.J. Habibie Stadium, PSM will play their home matches in the first half of the season at the Batakan Stadium in Balikpapan.)	40,000	11th
PSS	Sleman	Maguwoharjo Stadium	20,594	13th
PSS	Sleman	Manahan, at Surakarta (Note: Due to the ongoing renovation of the Maguwoharjo Stadium, PSS will play their home matches in the first half of the season at the Manahan Stadium in Surakarta.)	20,000	13th
Semen Padang	Padang	Gelora Haji Agus Salim (Note: Due to the ongoing renovation of the Gelora Haji Agus Salim Stadium, Semen Padang will play their first two home matches at the STIK Stadium in South Jakarta. The third and fourth home matches will be held at the West Sumatra Main Stadium in Padang Pariaman and Pakansari Stadium in Bogor.)	11,000	Liga 2 Runner Up

=== Personnel and kits ===
Note: Flags indicate national team as has been defined under FIFA eligibility rules. Players and coaches may hold more than one non-FIFA nationality.

Team	Head coach	Captain	Kit manufacturer	Main kit sponsor	Other kit sponsor(s)
Arema	(Portugal national football team) Zé Gomes	(Indonesia national football team) Johan Alfarizi	(Indonesia) Etams	Greenfields	List: Front: Anargya Aset Manajemen, Accola Hotel, Terrazone; Back: Pertamina; Sleeves: None; Shorts: None
Bali United	(Brazil national football team) Stefano Cugurra	(Indonesia national football team) Ricky Fajrin	(Indonesia) SPECS	Indofood	List: Front: KukuBima, Trima+, Bank Ina, Oppo, Mandiri Coal, ACMIC, Honda, Alderon, Mandiri Contractor, Mandiri Services; Back: CBN Fiber, Indomie, Riung; Sleeves: YCAB Foundation, Mandiri Tranship; Shorts: Trima+
Barito Putera	(Brazil national football team) Vitor Tinoco	(Indonesia national football team) Rizky Pora	(Indonesia) H^{1}	Hasnur Group	List: Front: None; Back: None; Sleeves: None; Shorts: None
Borneo Samarinda	(Spain national football team) Joaquín Gómez	(Indonesia national football team) Diego Michiels	(Indonesia) SPECS	Ansaf (Domestic) / Pupuk Kaltim (ACC)	List: Front: Pupuk Kaltim; Back: PStore; Sleeves: Ghani Raya Mandiri; Shorts: None
Dewa United	(Netherlands national football team) Jan Olde Riekerink	(Indonesia national football team) Rangga Muslim	(Indonesia) DRX	BAIC Indonesia	List: Front: Cow Play Cow Moo; Back: Carstensz Residence and Mall BSD; Sleeves: JHL Solitaire; Shorts: None
Madura United	(Argentina national football team) Alfredo Vera	(Brazil national football team) Lulinha	(Indonesia) DRX	Trans Utama Kargo (Domestic and ACGL)	List: Front: None; Back: None; Sleeves: None; Shorts: None
Malut United	(Indonesia national football team) Imran Nahumarury	(Indonesia national football team) Manahati Lestusen	(Indonesia) SPECS	Mineral Trobos	List: Front: PT Gebe Sinar Perkasa; Back: PT Gebe Prima Mandiri; Sleeves: Lumbung Ikan Maluku; Shorts: None
Persebaya	(Northern Ireland national football team) Paul Munster	(Brazil national football team) Bruno Moreira	(Indonesia) AZA	Kapal Api	List: Front: Extra Joss, Indomie, Teh Bonteh; Back: Citicon, MPM Honda Distributor; Sleeves: None; Shorts: None
Persib	(Croatia national football team) Bojan Hodak	(Indonesia national football team) Marc Klok	(Indonesia) Sportama	Indofood (Domestic) / Indomie (ACL2)	List: Front: Planet Persib, Le Minerale, Greenfields, Teh Pucuk Harum, Intersport, Pria Punya Selera, Vivo; Back: Kopi ABC; Sleeves: Indomie; Shorts: None
Persija	(Indonesia) Ricky Nelson (caretaker)	(Indonesia national football team) Rizky Ridho	(Indonesia) Juaraga	Indomie	List: Front: Amman Mineral, J Trust Bank, PStore, Bakrie Untuk Negeri; Back: Le Minerale; Sleeves: None; Shorts: None
Persik	(Portugal national football team) Divaldo Alves	(Portugal national football team) Zé Valente	(Indonesia) DRX	Athletes For Good	List: Front: Le Minerale, WBI Foods; Back: None; Sleeves: None; Shorts: None
Persis	(Malaysia national football team) Ong Kim Swee	(Indonesia national football team) Eky Taufik	(Indonesia) Made by club	Free Fire	List: Front: Minyak Goreng Sania, Aladin Bank; Back: Indosat; Sleeves: None; Shorts: None
Persita	(Brazil national football team) Fábio Lefundes	(Indonesia national football team) Muhammad Toha	(Indonesia) 1953^{1}	Indomilk	List: Front: Moya, Matrix Broadband, Aetra Tangerang; Back: Indomie; Sleeves: Palang Merah Indonesia, KABOOM Creative; Shorts: None
PSBS	(Argentina national football team) Marcos Guillermo Samso	(Indonesia national football team) Beto Gonçalves	(Indonesia) Kasumasa^{1}	NusaTuna	List: Front: PT Freeport Indonesia, Bank Papua, Ulam Laut; Back: Kopi ABC; Sleeves: None; Shorts: None
PSIS	(Indonesia national football team) Muhammad Ridwan (caretaker)	(Indonesia national football team) Septian David Maulana	(Indonesia) DRX	Indomie	List: Front: Le Minerale, DRX Token; Back: Yamaha Mataram Sakti; Sleeves: nexa; Shorts: None
PSM	(Portugal national football team) Bernardo Tavares	(Indonesia national football team) Muhammad Arfan	(Indonesia) DRX	Honda (Domestic) / Bosowa Corp (ACC)	List: Front: Astra Motor, Kredit Pintar; Back: None; Sleeves: None; Shorts: None
PSS	(Netherlands) Pieter Huistra	(Indonesia national football team) Kim Kurniawan	(Indonesia) DRX (1st half) (Indonesia) Scorelab^{1} (2nd half)	Amman Mineral	List: Front: Indomie, MedcoEnergi, Ithaca Resources, Le Minerale; Back: None; Sleeves: None; Shorts: None
Semen Padang	(Portugal national football team) Eduardo Almeida	(Indonesia national football team) Rosad Setiawan	(Indonesia) SPFC Apparel^{1}	Semen Padang	List: Front: None; Back: Taspen, Air Mineral SMS, Sumbar Smartphone; Sleeves: None; Shorts: None

Notes:

1. Apparel made by club.

=== Coaching changes ===
==== Pre-season ====
Team	Outgoing head coach	Manner of departure	Date of vacancy	Replaced by	Date of appointment
PSBS	(Indonesia) Regi Aditya Yonathan	Did not have AFC Pro license	12 March 2024	(Argentina) Juan Esnáider	13 May 2024
Semen Padang	(Indonesia) Delfi Adri	Did not have AFC Pro license	17 March 2024	(Indonesia) Hendri Susilo	25 March 2024
Arema	(Indonesia) Widodo Cahyono Putro	End of contract	30 April 2024	(Brazil) Joel Cornelli	24 June 2024
Madura United	(Brazil) Mauricio Souza	End of contract	10 May 2024^{1}	(Indonesia) Widodo Cahyono Putro	29 June 2024
PSS	(Serbia) Risto Vidaković	End of contract	27 June 2024	(Japan) Wagner Lopes	27 June 2024
Persija	(Germany) Thomas Doll	Mutual consent	14 June 2024	(Spain) Carlos Peña	29 June 2024
Persita	(Chile) Luis Durán	End of contract	30 June 2024	(Brazil) Fábio Lefundes	3 July 2024

==== During the season ====
Team	Outgoing head coach	Manner of departure	Date of vacancy	Week	Table	Replaced by	Date of appointment
PSBS	(Argentina) Juan Esnáider	Sacked	10 September 2024	3	16th	(Argentina) Marcos Guillermo Samso (caretaker)	10 September 2024
Semen Padang	(Indonesia) Hendri Susilo	Sacked	13 September 2024	4	16th	(Indonesia) Hengky Ardiles (caretaker)	13 September 2024
Madura United	(Indonesia) Widodo Cahyono Putro	Resigned	16 September 2024	4	17th	(Indonesia) Rakhmad Basuki (caretaker)	16 September 2024
Semen Padang	(Indonesia) Hengky Ardiles	End of caretaker role	20 September 2024	5	16th	(Portugal) Eduardo Almeida	20 September 2024
Persis	(Bosnia and Herzegovina) Milomir Šešlija	Sacked	25 September 2024	6	15th	(Indonesia) Yogie Nugraha (caretaker)	25 September 2024
Madura United	(Indonesia) Rakhmad Basuki	End of caretaker role	4 October 2024	7	17th	(Portugal) Paulo Menezes	4 October 2024
PSS	(Japan) Wagner Lopes	Sacked	10 October 2024	7	18th	(Brazil) Mazola Júnior	11 October 2024
PSBS	(Argentina) Marcos Guillermo Samso	End of caretaker role	16 October 2024	7	9th	(Indonesia) Emral Abus	16 October 2024
Persis	(Indonesia) Yogie Nugraha	End of caretaker role	2 November 2024	9	15th	(Indonesia) Hanafing	2 November 2024
Persis	(Indonesia) Hanafing	End of caretaker role	25 November 2024	11	16th	(Malaysia) Ong Kim Swee	25 November 2024
Barito Putera	(Indonesia) Rahmad Darmawan	Mutual consent	26 November 2024	11	14th	(Indonesia) Frans Sinatra (caretaker)	26 November 2024
Barito Putera	(Indonesia) Frans Sinatra	End of caretaker role	9 December 2024	13	14th	(Indonesia) Rahmad Darmawan	9 December 2024
Madura United	(Portugal) Paulo Menezes	Resigned	18 December 2024	15	18th	(Indonesia) Rakhmad Basuki (caretaker)	18 December 2024
Arema	(Brazil) Joel Cornelli	Sacked	19 December 2024	15	9th	(Indonesia) Kuncoro (caretaker)	19 December 2024
Arema	(Indonesia) Kuncoro	End of caretaker role	4 January 2025	17	4th	(Portugal) Zé Gomes	4 January 2025
Borneo Samarinda	(Netherlands) Pieter Huistra	Sacked	16 January 2025	18	10th	(Spain) Joaquín Gómez	16 January 2025
Madura United	(Indonesia) Rakhmad Basuki	End of caretaker role	21 January 2025	19	18th	(Argentina) Alfredo Vera	21 January 2025
Barito Putera	(Indonesia) Rahmad Darmawan	Sacked	25 January 2025	19	15th	(Brazil) Vitor Tinoco	25 January 2025
PSBS	(Indonesia) Emral Abus	Became technical director	6 February 2025	21	12th	(Argentina) Marcos Guillermo Samso	6 February 2025
PSS	(Brazil) Mazola Júnior	Sacked	18 February 2025	23	17th	(Netherlands) Pieter Huistra	19 February 2025
Persik	(Brazil) Marcelo Rospide	Became assistant coach	10 April 2025	27	12th	(Portugal) Divaldo Alves	10 April 2025
PSIS	(Malta) Gilbert Agius	Sacked	29 April 2025	30	17th	(Indonesia) Muhammad Ridwan (caretaker)	29 April 2025
Persija	(Spain) Carlos Peña	Mutual consent	1 May 2025	31	5th	(Indonesia) Ricky Nelson (caretaker)	1 May 2025

Notes:

1. The contract duration ended before the club played their first match at Championship Series last season.

== Foreign players ==
Starting from this season, Liga Indonesia Baru announced an increase in the foreign player quota to eight foreign players. However, every clubs can only register up to six of them on starting eleven for a single matchday squad and the other two can only come in to replace other foreign players.

- Players named in **bold** indicates the player was registered during the mid-season transfer window.
- Former players named in italics are players that were out of squad or left the club within the season, after the pre-season transfer window, or in the mid-season transfer window, and at least had one appearance.

Team	Players				Former Players
Arema	Player 1	Player 2	Player 3	Player 4	Former Players
Arema	(Australia) Charles Lokolingoy	(Brazil) Dalberto	(Brazil) Lucas Frigeri	(Brazil) Pablo Oliveira	(Brazil) Wiliam Marcílio (South Korea) Choi Bo-kyung
Arema	Player 5	Player 6	Player 7	Player 8	(Brazil) Wiliam Marcílio (South Korea) Choi Bo-kyung
Arema	(Brazil) Thales Lira	(Colombia) Julián Guevara			(Brazil) Wiliam Marcílio (South Korea) Choi Bo-kyung
Bali United	Player 1	Player 2	Player 3	Player 4	
Bali United	(Australia) Brandon Wilson	(Brazil) Adilson Maringá	(Brazil) Everton	(Brazil) **Jaime Xavier**	(Japan) Kenzo Nambu
Bali United	Player 5	Player 6	Player 7	Player 8	(Japan) Kenzo Nambu
Bali United	(Cameroon) Privat Mbarga	(Japan) Mitsuru Maruoka	(Montenegro) **Boris Kopitović**	(Thailand) Elias Dolah	(Japan) Kenzo Nambu
Barito Putera	Player 1	Player 2	Player 3	Player 4	
Barito Putera	(Brazil) **Anderson Nascimento**	(Brazil) Lucas Morelatto	(Brazil) Murilo	(Brazil) **Renan Alves**	(Brazil) Lucão (Nigeria) Alhaji Gero (Spain) Chechu Meneses (Spain) Youssef Ezzejjari
Barito Putera	Player 5	Player 6	Player 7	Player 8	(Brazil) Lucão (Nigeria) Alhaji Gero (Spain) Chechu Meneses (Spain) Youssef Ezzejjari
Barito Putera	(Gabon) Lévy Madinda	(Nicaragua) **Jaime Moreno**	(South Korea) Moon Chi-sung	(Uruguay) **Matías Mier**	(Brazil) Lucão (Nigeria) Alhaji Gero (Spain) Chechu Meneses (Spain) Youssef Ezzejjari
Borneo Samarinda	Player 1	Player 2	Player 3	Player 4	
Borneo Samarinda	(Argentina) Mariano Peralta	(Brazil) Berguinho	(Brazil) Gabriel Furtado	(Brazil) **Matheus Pato**	(Brazil) Léo Gaúcho (Brazil) Lucas Salinas
Borneo Samarinda	Player 5	Player 6	Player 7	Player 8	(Brazil) Léo Gaúcho (Brazil) Lucas Salinas
Borneo Samarinda	(Brazil) Ronaldo Rodrigues	(Burundi) Christophe Nduwarugira	(Japan) Kei Hirose	(Japan) **Kenzo Nambu**	(Brazil) Léo Gaúcho (Brazil) Lucas Salinas
Dewa United	Player 1	Player 2	Player 3	Player 4	
Dewa United	(Argentina) Alexis Messidoro	(Brazil) Alex Martins	(Brazil) Jajá	(Japan) Taisei Marukawa	
Dewa United	Player 5	Player 6	Player 7	Player 8	
Dewa United	(Netherlands) Sonny Stevens	(North Macedonia) Risto Mitrevski	(Portugal) Ângelo Meneses		
Madura United	Player 1	Player 2	Player 3	Player 4	
Madura United	(Bosnia and Herzegovina) **Kerim Palić**	(Brazil) Iran Júnior	(Brazil) Lulinha	(Colombia) **Brayan Angulo**	(Brazil) Dida (Brazil) Maxuel (Japan) Noriki Akada (Philippines) Christian Rontini
Madura United	Player 5	Player 6	Player 7	Player 8	(Brazil) Dida (Brazil) Maxuel (Japan) Noriki Akada (Philippines) Christian Rontini
Madura United	(Netherlands) Jordy Wehrmann	(Portugal) Pedro Monteiro	(Serbia) **Miljan Škrbić**	(Spain) **Youssef Ezzejjari**	(Brazil) Dida (Brazil) Maxuel (Japan) Noriki Akada (Philippines) Christian Rontini
Malut United	Player 1	Player 2	Player 3	Player 4	
Malut United	(Argentina) **Jonathan Bustos**	(Armenia) Wbeymar Angulo	(Brazil) **Dida**	(Brazil) **Júnior Brandão**	(Argentina) Jorge Correa (Brazil) Cássio Scheid (Japan) Tatsuro Nagamatsu (United States) Victor Mansaray
Malut United	Player 5	Player 6	Player 7	Player 8	(Argentina) Jorge Correa (Brazil) Cássio Scheid (Japan) Tatsuro Nagamatsu (United States) Victor Mansaray
Malut United	(Haiti) **Sony Nordé**	(Paraguay) Diego Martínez	(Portugal) Adriano Castanheira	(Spain) **Chechu Meneses**	(Argentina) Jorge Correa (Brazil) Cássio Scheid (Japan) Tatsuro Nagamatsu (United States) Victor Mansaray
Persebaya	Player 1	Player 2	Player 3	Player 4	
Persebaya	(Brazil) Bruno Moreira	(Mexico) Francisco Rivera	(Montenegro) Slavko Damjanović	(North Macedonia) **Dime Dimov**	
Persebaya	Player 5	Player 6	Player 7	Player 8	
Persebaya	(Palestine) Mohammed Rashid	(Portugal) Flávio Silva	(Portugal) Gilson Costa	(Serbia) **Dejan Tumbas**	
Persib	Player 1	Player 2	Player 3	Player 4	
Persib	(Brazil) Ciro Alves	(Brazil) David da Silva	(Brazil) Gustavo França	(Croatia) Mateo Kocijan	(Cape Verde) Mailson Lima
Persib	Player 5	Player 6	Player 7	Player 8	(Cape Verde) Mailson Lima
Persib	(Curaçao) **Gervane Kastaneer**	(Netherlands) Nick Kuipers	(Philippines) Kevin Ray Mendoza	(Spain) Tyronne del Pino	(Cape Verde) Mailson Lima
Persija	Player 1	Player 2	Player 3	Player 4	
Persija	(Brazil) Carlos Eduardo	(Brazil) Gustavo Almeida	(Brazil) **Pablo Andrade**	(Croatia) Marko Šimić	(Brazil) Pedro Dias
Persija	Player 5	Player 6	Player 7	Player 8	(Brazil) Pedro Dias
Persija	(Czech Republic) Ondřej Kúdela	(Japan) Ryo Matsumura	(Poland) Maciej Gajos	(Spain) Ramón Bueno	(Brazil) Pedro Dias
Persik	Player 1	Player 2	Player 3	Player 4	
Persik	(Argentina) Ramiro Fergonzi	(Brazil) Brendon Lucas	(Brazil) Léo Navacchio	(France) Ousmane Fané	
Persik	Player 5	Player 6	Player 7	Player 8	
Persik	(Lebanon) Majed Osman	(Nepal) Rohit Chand	(Portugal national football team) Kiko	(Portugal) Zé Valente	
Persis	Player 1	Player 2	Player 3	Player 4	
Persis	(Argentina) **Lautaro Belleggia**	(Brazil) **Cleylton**	(Brazil) Eduardo Kunde	(Brazil) **Jhon Cley**	(Argentina) Facundo Aranda (Brazil) Ricardo Lima (Switzerland) Karim Rossi (Uruguay) Gonzalo Andrada
Persis	Player 5	Player 6	Player 7	Player 8	(Argentina) Facundo Aranda (Brazil) Ricardo Lima (Switzerland) Karim Rossi (Uruguay) Gonzalo Andrada
Persis	(Japan) Sho Yamamoto	(Mali) Moussa Sidibé	(Netherlands) **Jordy Tutuarima**		(Argentina) Facundo Aranda (Brazil) Ricardo Lima (Switzerland) Karim Rossi (Uruguay) Gonzalo Andrada
Persita	Player 1	Player 2	Player 3	Player 4	
Persita	(Brazil) **Éber Bessa**	(Greece) Marios Ogkmpoe	(Kyrgyzstan) **Tamirlan Kozubayev**	(Portugal) Igor Rodrigues	(Brazil) Bruno da Cruz (Brazil) Marcelo Barbosa
Persita	Player 5	Player 6	Player 7	Player 8	(Brazil) Bruno da Cruz (Brazil) Marcelo Barbosa
Persita	(Portugal) Sandro Sakho	(South Korea) Bae Sin-yeong	(South Sudan) **Ayom Majok**	(Uzbekistan) Javlon Guseynov	(Brazil) Bruno da Cruz (Brazil) Marcelo Barbosa
PSBS	Player 1	Player 2	Player 3	Player 4	
PSBS	(Argentina) Abel Argañaraz	(Argentina) **Ariel Nahuelpán**	(Argentina) Julián Velázquez	(Brazil) Alexsandro	(Argentina) Gabriel Esparza (Brazil) Jaime Xavier
PSBS	Player 5	Player 6	Player 7	Player 8	(Argentina) Gabriel Esparza (Brazil) Jaime Xavier
PSBS	(Brazil) Jonata Machado	(Japan) Takuya Matsunaga	(Venezuela) Williams Lugo		(Argentina) Gabriel Esparza (Brazil) Jaime Xavier
PSIS	Player 1	Player 2	Player 3	Player 4	
PSIS	(Brazil) **Gustavo Souza**	(Brazil) João Ferrari	(Brazil) Lucas Barreto	(Burundi) **Sudi Abdallah**	(Islamic Republic of Afghanistan) Taufee Skandari (Angola) Evandro Brandão (Brazil) Fernandinho (France) Boubakary Diarra (Spain) Ruxi
PSIS	Player 5	Player 6	Player 7	Player 8	(Islamic Republic of Afghanistan) Taufee Skandari (Angola) Evandro Brandão (Brazil) Fernandinho (France) Boubakary Diarra (Spain) Ruxi
PSIS	(Timor-Leste) Gali Freitas				(Islamic Republic of Afghanistan) Taufee Skandari (Angola) Evandro Brandão (Brazil) Fernandinho (France) Boubakary Diarra (Spain) Ruxi
PSM	Player 1	Player 2	Player 3	Player 4	
PSM	(Brazil) Aloísio Neto	(Brazil) **Matheus Silva**	(Brazil) Victor Luiz	(Cape Verde) Yuran Fernandes	(Portugal) Adilson Silva (South Sudan) Tito Okello
PSM	Player 5	Player 6	Player 7	Player 8	(Portugal) Adilson Silva (South Sudan) Tito Okello
PSM	(Guinea-Bissau) **Balotelli**	(Japan) Daisuke Sakai	(Senegal) Latyr Fall	(Slovenia) Nermin Haljeta	(Portugal) Adilson Silva (South Sudan) Tito Okello
PSS	Player 1	Player 2	Player 3	Player 4	
PSS	(Brazil) Alan Bernardon	(Brazil) Betinho	(Brazil) Cleberson	(Brazil) Gustavo Tocantins	(Brazil) Danilo Alves (South Korea) Moon Chang-jin
PSS	Player 5	Player 6	Player 7	Player 8	(Brazil) Danilo Alves (South Korea) Moon Chang-jin
PSS	(Brazil) **Marcelo Cirino**	(Brazil) **Vico**	(Ghana) Phil Ofosu-Ayeh	(Italy) Nicolao Dumitru	(Brazil) Danilo Alves (South Korea) Moon Chang-jin
Semen Padang	Player 1	Player 2	Player 3	Player 4	
Semen Padang	(Brazil) **Arthur Augusto**	(Brazil) **Bruno Gomes**	(Croatia) Tin Martić	(Ghana) **Alhassan Wakaso**	(Brazil) Bruno Dybal (England) Charlie Scott (Japan) Ryohei Michibuchi (Nigeria) Kenneth Ngwoke (Panama) Jan Carlos Vargas
Semen Padang	Player 5	Player 6	Player 7	Player 8	(Brazil) Bruno Dybal (England) Charlie Scott (Japan) Ryohei Michibuchi (Nigeria) Kenneth Ngwoke (Panama) Jan Carlos Vargas
Semen Padang	(Portugal) **Filipe Chaby**	(Portugal) **Marco Baixinho**	(Saint Vincent and the Grenadines) Cornelius Stewart	(South Korea) Kim Min-gyu	(Brazil) Bruno Dybal (England) Charlie Scott (Japan) Ryohei Michibuchi (Nigeria) Kenneth Ngwoke (Panama) Jan Carlos Vargas

== League table ==
Pos	Team	Pld	W	D	L	GF	GA	GD	Pts	Qualification or relegation
1	Persib (C)	34	19	12	3	60	33	+27	69	Qualification for the 2025–26 AFC Champions League Two qualifying play-offs
2	Dewa United	34	17	10	7	65	33	+32	61	Qualification for the 2025–26 AFC Challenge League group stage
3	Malut United	34	15	12	7	48	33	+15	57	
4	Persebaya	34	15	11	8	41	38	+3	56 (Note: Ranked on head-to-head points: Persebaya 4, Borneo Samarinda 1.)	
5	Borneo Samarinda	34	16	8	10	50	38	+12	56	
6	PSM	34	13	14	7	47	34	+13	53	
7	Persija	34	14	9	11	47	38	+9	51	
8	Bali United	34	14	8	12	50	41	+9	50	
9	PSBS	34	13	9	12	44	47	−3	48	
10	Arema	34	13	8	13	53	51	+2	47	
11	Persita	34	12	7	15	32	43	−11	43	
12	Persik	34	10	11	13	40	42	−2	41	
13	Semen Padang	34	9	9	16	38	60	−22	36 (Note: Ranked on head-to-head points: Semen Padang 8, Persis 5, Madura United 3.)	
14	Persis	34	9	9	16	34	46	−12	36	
15	Madura United	34	10	6	18	36	58	−22	36	
16	PSS (Note: PSS was deducted three points by the PSSI Disciplinary Committee due to the match fixing case in the 2018 Liga 2.) (R)	34	11	4	19	43	50	−7	34 (Note: Tied on head-to-head points. Ranked on head-to-head goal differences: PSS +2, Barito Putera –2.)	Relegation to the 2025–26 Championship
17	Barito Putera (R)	34	8	10	16	42	57	−15	34	Relegation to the 2025–26 Championship
18	PSIS (R)	34	6	7	21	29	57	−28	25	Relegation to the 2025–26 Championship

Source: Liga 1 2024–25
Rules for classification: 1) Points; 2) Head-to-head points; 3) Head-to-head goal difference; 4) Head-to-head goals scored; 5) Goal difference; 6) Goals scored; 7) Fair-play points; 8) Drawing of lots.
(C) Champions; (R) Relegated

=== Position by round ===
Team ╲ Round	1	2	3	4	5	6	7	8	9	10	11	12	13	14	15	16	17	18	19	20	21	22	23	24	25	26	27	28	29	30	31	32	33	34
Arema	10	14	14	14	13	14	10	8	9	7	7	6	7	7	9	7	5	9	10	10	9	11	7	9	9	7	6	8	8	10	9	10	9	10
Bali United	5	3	6	5	6	4	3	1	1	4	4	7	6	9	5	8	4	8	5	5	5	5	5	6	5	5	9	9	11	9	6	9	10	8
Barito Putera	17	10	12	12	9	9	13	13	13	13	14	14	14	14	15	15	15	16	15	15	15	13	13	13	13	13	13	13	14	15	16	16	17	17
Borneo Samarinda	4	2	2	2	1	2	2	5	3	1	3	3	5	6	3	5	9	10	9	9	8	8	6	5	8	9	7	7	7	6	5	5	5	5
Dewa United	11	11	13	11	11	10	12	12	11	11	11	10	12	10	8	6	11	7	4	4	4	2	3	2	2	2	2	2	2	2	2	2	2	2
Madura United	8	13	15	17	17	18	17	18	16	17	17	17	17	18	18	18	18	17	18	18	17	18	16	16	17	18	14	14	15	13	13	14	14	15
Malut United	9	12	10	8	10	13	11	11	12	12	12	11	11	11	12	11	12	12	12	11	11	9	10	8	7	6	5	4	5	4	4	4	3	3
Persebaya	6	6	4	3	2	1	1	2	4	2	1	1	1	1	1	1	2	2	2	3	3	4	2	3	3	3	3	3	3	3	3	3	4	4
Persib	1	4	8	7	4	3	4	3	2	3	2	2	2	2	2	2	1	1	1	1	1	1	1	1	1	1	1	1	1	1	1	1	1	1
Persija	3	5	3	4	5	8	8	7	6	5	6	5	3	3	4	3	3	3	3	2	2	3	4	4	4	4	4	5	4	5	7	6	7	7
Persik	14	8	9	10	7	6	6	6	7	9	10	12	10	12	11	9	6	4	7	6	6	10	11	11	11	12	12	12	12	12	12	12	12	12
Persis	16	17	17	13	15	15	15	15	15	16	16	16	16	17	16	16	16	18	16	17	18	16	18	18	15	15	15	15	13	14	14	13	13	14
Persita	7	7	5	6	8	7	7	10	8	8	8	8	8	4	7	10	7	5	8	7	7	6	8	10	10	10	11	11	9	11	11	11	11	11
PSBS	15	15	16	15	14	12	9	9	10	10	9	9	9	8	10	12	10	11	11	12	12	12	12	12	12	11	10	10	10	7	8	7	8	9
PSIS	12	9	7	9	12	11	14	14	14	15	13	13	13	13	13	13	13	14	14	13	13	14	14	14	14	14	16	16	16	17	18	18	18	18
PSM	2	1	1	1	3	5	5	4	5	6	5	4	4	5	6	4	8	6	6	8	10	7	9	7	6	8	8	6	6	8	10	8	6	6
PSS	18	18	18	18	18	17	18	16	17	14	15	15	15	16	14	14	14	13	13	14	14	15	17	17	18	17	18	18	18	18	17	17	16	16
Semen Padang	13	16	11	16	16	16	16	17	18	18	18	18	18	15	17	17	17	15	17	16	16	17	15	15	16	16	17	17	17	16	15	15	15	13

Qualification for the 2025–26 AFC Champions League Two qualifying play-offs
Qualification for the 2025–26 AFC Challenge League group stage
Relegation to the 2025–26 Liga 2

Source: Liga 1 2024–25

== Results ==
=== Fixtures & results ===
Home \ Away	AFC	BLI	BAR	BOR	DWU	MDR	MLT	PBY	PSB	PSJ	KDR	PSO	PTR	BIK	SMG	PSM	PSS	SMP
Arema		1–0	4–2	0–2	0–0	0–1	3–1	1–1	1–3	1–2	0–3	1–1	3–0	3–2	2–2	1–1	6–2	0–2
Bali United	0–0		3–2	3–2	0–0	0–2	1–1	2–0	1–1	3–1	1–3	3–0	1–1	0–2	4–0	1–1	0–0	2–0
Barito Putera	1–3	3–1		1–1	1–1	1–0	1–1	3–0	1–2	2–3	2–2	0–1	0–2	0–3	0–0	1–4	0–3	2–1
Borneo Samarinda	3–1	2–0	2–1		1–0	5–0	1–0	1–1	2–2	1–0	0–4	0–1	0–0	3–0	0–0	1–1	1–0	1–3
Dewa United	2–0	1–0	1–1	0–1		3–3	1–2	2–0	2–2	2–1	2–3	2–0	3–0	4–0	2–1	3–2	2–1	6–0
Madura United	2–4	2–1	2–4	2–3	3–1		1–1	1–2	2–2	1–0	2–1	2–0	0–1	0–0	2–0	1–3	0–3	0–1
Malut United	2–1	1–4	0–0	3–0	1–1	0–1		0–0	1–0	0–1	2–1	3–0	2–1	1–1	5–1	2–2	1–0	2–1
Persebaya	3–2	1–3	2–1	2–1	0–0	1–0	0–2		4–1	2–1	4–1	2–1	1–1	1–0	1–1	1–1	1–0	1–1
Persib	1–1	2–1	1–1	1–0	0–2	0–0	2–0	2–0		2–0	4–1	3–2	3–1	4–1	2–1	1–0	3–0	1–1
Persija	1–3	3–0	3–0	1–1	0–0	4–1	0–0	1–1	2–2		2–0	2–1	2–0	2–2	2–0	1–1	3–1	0–2
Persik	1–0	1–3	1–1	1–2	1–2	1–0	0–0	3–3	0–2	0–1		0–0	1–0	0–1	0–1	2–2	0–0	3–1
Persis	0–1	2–2	0–0	3–2	1–1	4–0	1–3	2–1	0–1	3–3	0–1		1–0	1–1	0–1	0–1	0–2	1–1
Persita	3–2	0–1	2–1	1–2	0–4	1–1	1–1	0–1	2–2	0–0	1–0	2–0		0–2	2–1	2–1	1–2	1–0
PSBS	2–2	2–0	2–1	1–0	3–1	2–1	1–3	0–1	1–1	3–1	1–1	0–2	1–3		1–3	1–2	2–1	3–2
PSIS	1–2	2–1	1–2	2–5	1–4	1–2	1–3	0–1	0–1	0–2	0–0	1–2	0–1	1–0		1–1	1–2	1–0
PSM	0–1	0–1	3–2	1–0	3–1	2–0	3–2	0–1	0–0	1–0	1–1	3–0	1–0	1–1	0–0		1–1	2–0
PSS	3–1	1–2	1–2	1–1	0–1	4–0	0–1	3–1	1–2	2–1	0–2	1–4	1–2	0–1	2–1	3–1		2–4
Semen Padang	1–2	1–5	1–2	1–3	1–8	2–1	1–1	0–0	1–4	0–1	1–1	0–0	2–0	1–1	3–2	1–1	1–0	

Source: Liga 1 2024–25
Legend: Blue = home team win; Yellow = draw; Red = away team win.
For upcoming matches, an "a" indicates there is an article about the rivalry between the two participants.

=== Results by round ===
Team ╲ Round	1	2	3	4	5	6	7	8	9	10	11	12	13	14	15	16	17	18	19	20	21	22	23	24	25	26	27	28	29	30	31	32	33	34
Arema	D	L	D	D	W	L	W	W	L	W	W	W	L	D	L	W	W	L	L	L	W	D	W	D	L	W	W	L	L^{†}	D	W	L	D	L
Bali United	W	W	L	D	D	W	W	W	W	L	L	D	L	W	L	W	D^{†}	L	W	W	L	W	D	L	D	D	L	D	L	W	W	L	L	W
Barito Putera	L	W	L	D	W	D	L	L	D	L	L	D	L	D	L	L	D	L	W	W	D	W	L	W	W	D	L	L	L	L	D	D	L	W
Borneo Samarinda	W	W	W	D	W	D	D	L	W	W	L	L	D	D	W	L	L	L	W	L	W	L	W	W	L	L	W	D	D	W	W	W	D	W
Dewa United	D	D	L	W	D	D	D	L	W	L	W	W	D	D	W	W	L	W	W	W	W	W	L	W	W	W	L	D	W	L	D	W	D	W
Madura United	D	L	L	L	L	D	D	L	W	L	L	L	L	L	L	W	L	W	L	D	W	D	W	D	L	W^{†}	W^{†}	L	W^{†}	W	L	L	W	L
Malut United	D	D	D	W	L	L	W	L	D	D	W	W	D	L	D	W	L	L	W	W	D	W	D	W	W	D	W	W	D	W	W	L	W	D
Persebaya	W	D	W	W	W	W	D	L	D	W	W	W	W	W	D	W	L	L	L	L	D	L	W	L	W	W	D	D	W	D	D	D	D	L
Persib	W	D	D	D	W	W	D	W	W	D	W	W	W	W	W	W	D^{†}	D	L	W	W	W	D	D	L	W	W	D	W	W	L	D	D	W
Persija	W	D	W	L	D	L	D	W	W	W	L	W	W	D	L	W	W	W	W	D	D	L	D	L	W^{†}	L	L^{†}	D	W	L	L	W	L	D
Persik	L	W	D	D	W	W	L	W	L	D	L	L	W	L	W	W	W	W	D	L	D	L	D	D	L	L	D	D	L	L	D	W	D	L
Persis	L	L	L	W	L	L	D	W	L	L	L	D	L	D	D	L	L	L	W	D	L	W	D	D	W	D	W	L	W	W	L	W	D	L
Persita	W	D	W	L	L	W	D	L	W	D	W	L	W	W	L	L	W	W	L	D	D	W	L	L	D	L	L	W	W	L	L	L	D	L
PSBS	L	L	L	W	W	L	W	W	L	W	W	L	W	L	D	L	W	D	D	L	D	D	L	D	D	W	W	W	D	W	W	L	D	L
PSIS	L	W	W	L	L	D	L	L	L	L	W	W	D	W	L	L	D	L	L	W	L	L	D	D	L^{†}	D	L^{†}	D	L	L	L	L	L	L
PSM	W	W	W	D	L	D	D	W	D	D	D	W	D	D	D	W	L	W	D	L	L	D	D	W	W	L	D	W	D	L	L	W	W	W
PSS	L	L	L	D	D	W	L	W	L	W	L	L	L	D	W	L	W	W	D	L	L	L	L	L	L	W	L	L	L	L	W	W	W	W
Semen Padang	L	L	W	L	L	L	D	L	L	D	D	L	L	W	D	L	L	W	L	W	D	L	W	D	D	L	L	L	W	W	W	D	D	W

Source: Liga 1 2024–25

Notes:

- ^{†} The Bali United vs Persib match was originally scheduled to be held on 1 December 2024, but was postponed and rescheduled to be held on 7 January 2025.
- ^{†} The Persija vs PSIS match was originally scheduled to be played on 4 March 2025, but was postponed due to flooding in Jabodetabek region. The match was rescheduled to be played on 5 March 2025 at Indomilk Arena in Tangerang Regency.
- ^{†} The PSIS vs Madura United match was originally scheduled to be held on 8 March 2025, but was postponed and rescheduled to be held on 16 March 2025.
- ^{†} The Madura United vs Persija match was originally scheduled to be held on 13 March 2025, but was postponed and rescheduled to be held on 6 April 2025.
- ^{†} The Arema vs Madura United match was originally scheduled to be held on 13 April 2025, but was postponed and rescheduled to be held on 24 April 2025.

== Season statistics ==
=== Top scorers ===
Rank	Player	Team	Goals
1	(Brazil) Alex Martins	Dewa United	26
2	(Spain) Tyronne del Pino	Persib	18
2	(Brazil) Gustavo	Persija	18
4	(Brazil) Gustavo Tocantins	PSS	16
5	(Brazil) Dalberto	Arema	15
6	(Brazil) Lulinha	Madura United	13
6	(Brazil) Alexsandro	PSBS	13
8	(Indonesia) Egy Maulana Vikri	Dewa United	12
8	(Slovenia) Nermin Haljeta	PSM	12

=== Hat-tricks ===
Player	For	Against	Result	Date
(Brazil) Gustavo	Persija	Barito Putera	3–0 (H)	10 August 2024
(Indonesia) Egy Maulana Vikri	Dewa United	Semen Padang	8–1 (A)	25 October 2024
(Greece) Marios Ogkmpoe	Persita	PSBS	3–1 (A)	12 December 2024
(Brazil) Gustavo	Persija	PSS	3–1 (H)	21 December 2024
(Uruguay) Matías Mier	Barito Putera	Persebaya	3–0 (H)	25 January 2025
(Brazil) Alex Martins	Dewa United	PSM	3–2 (H)	27 January 2025
(Brazil) Alex Martins	Dewa United	PSIS	4–1 (A)	3 February 2025
(Brazil) Alex Martins^{4}	Dewa United	Semen Padang	6–0 (H)	5 March 2025
(Indonesia) Yakob Sayuri	Malut United	Persis	3–1 (A)	12 April 2025
(Indonesia) Yance Sayuri	Malut United	PSIS	5–1 (H)	16 May 2025
(Brazil) Alex Martins	Dewa United	PSBS	4–0 (H)	23 May 2025

Note: ^{4} – player scored 4 goals

=== Top assists ===
Rank	Player	Club	Assist
1	(Argentina) Mariano Peralta	Borneo Samarinda	12
1	(Brazil) Ciro Alves	Persib	12
3	(Argentina) Alexis Messidoro	Dewa United	10
4	(Japan) Ryo Matsumura	Persija	9
5	(Indonesia) Rizky Pora	Barito Putera	8
6	(Cameroon) Privat Mbarga	Bali United	7
6	(Indonesia) Egy Maulana Vikri	Dewa United	7
6	(Mexico) Francisco Rivera	Persebaya	7
6	(Spain) Tyronne Del Pino	Persib	7
6	(Brazil) Victor Luiz	PSM	7

=== Clean sheets ===
Rank	Player	Club	Clean sheets
1	(Netherlands) Sonny Stevens	Dewa United	14
2	(Indonesia) Nadeo Argawinata	Borneo Samarinda	10
2	(Philippines) Kevin Ray Mendoza	Persib	10
2	(Brazil) Léo Navacchio	Persik	10
5	(Portugal) Igor Rodrigues	Persita	8
5	(Indonesia) John Pigai	PSBS	8
7	(Indonesia) Ernando Ari	Persebaya	7
7	(Brazil) Carlos Eduardo	Persija	7
9	(Brazil) Lucas Frigeri	Arema	6
9	(Brazil) Adilson Maringá	Bali United	6
9	(Indonesia) Miswar Saputra	Madura United	6
9	(Indonesia) Muhammad Riyandi	Persis	6

=== Discipline ===
==== Player ====
- Most yellow cards: 13
  - (Indonesia) Fabiano Beltrame (PSBS)
- Most red cards: 3
  - (Indonesia) Ricky Kambuaya (Dewa United)

==== Club ====
- Most yellow cards: 93
  - Bali United
- Fewest yellow cards: 57
  - Malut United
- Most red cards: 9
  - Borneo Samarinda
- Fewest red cards: 1
  - PSM
  - PSS

== Attendances ==
=== Overall ===
Pos	Team	Total	High	Low	Average	Change
1	Persija	262,031	39,395	6,723	15,414	−11.2%
2	Persib	250,570	29,569	3,980	14,739	+17.1%
3	Persebaya	250,386	27,190	5,200	14,729	+65.1%
4	Persis	127,347	14,545	1,587	7,491	−23.0%
5	PSS	93,406	14,300	2,002	5,494	−38.2%
6	Semen Padang	91,350	12,000	8	5,374	n/a^{†}
7	Bali United	83,750	10,085	2,130	4,926	−9.0%
8	Malut United	65,791	8,214	2,216	3,870	n/a^{†}
9	Borneo Samarinda	64,121	10,135	609	3,772	−49.2%
10	Persik	43,458	5,967	455	2,556	−26.4%
11	PSM	38,905	7,715	0	2,289	−33.6%
12	Barito Putera	39,450	6,828	50	2,321	−28.7%
13	Persita	33,258	8,675	372	1,956	−25.7%
14	PSBS	23,010	7,561	97	1,354	n/a^{†}
15	Madura United	21,265	4,923	202	1,251	−52.1%
16	PSIS	20,419	5,122	80	1,201	−79.5%
17	Arema	9,510	2,850	0	559	+326.7%
18	Dewa United	4,049	958	0	238	−60.8%
	League total	1,518,611	39,395	0	4,963	−5.2%

Source: Liga 1 2024–25
Notes:
^{†} Teams played previous season in Liga 2

=== Home match played ===
Team \ Match played	1	2	3	4	5	6	7	8	9	10	11	12	13	14	15	16	17	Total
Arema	831	839	269	2,402	225	352	256	1,164	121	201	0	0	0	0	0	2,850	0	9,510
Bali United	5,311	4,059	4,557	3,615	5,198	5,826	4,922	8,390	10,085	4,097	6,218	3,835	3,159	2,130	2,992	3,864	5,492	83,750
Barito Putera	0	0	0	0	0	50	0	0	100	0	0	6,828	6,692	6,828	6,754	5,407	6,791	39,450
Borneo Samarinda	1,917	1,492	928	742	1,519	609	845	1,146	628	1,345	951	10,135	8,518	9,426	6,691	8,388	8,841	64,121
Dewa United	0	50	0	0	463	124	126	197	178	415	0	216	250	453	473	146	958	4,049
Madura United	672	314	839	204	489	3,334	202	224	664	622	496	475	1,403	4,174	1,326	904	4,923	21,265
Malut United	0^{1}	0	0	0	7,528	7,532	7,875	8,214	4,767	3,077	4,020	3,428	4,625	2,216	2,755	7,418	2,336	65,791
Persebaya	25,632	7,576	13,189	11,650	6,423	27,190	25,000	9,278	10,931	5,200	5,200	19,152	24,301	13,123	13,921	7,097	25,523	250,386
Persib	10,949	17,337	9,670	16,078	0^{2}	0^{2}	3,980^{2}	4,824^{2}	9,465^{2}	15,383	21,359	23,339	10,304	24,466	25,512	29,569	28,335	250,570
Persija	15,971	25,057	17,345	0	9,418	17,154	6,723	27,522	28,027	19,052	27,760	0	0	39,395	9,072	7,889	11,646	262,031
Persik	4,190	2,196	1,031	3,318	4,558	1,234	455	1,521	1,242	5,967	982	4,782	1,176	0	1,527	5,884	3,395	43,458
Persis	14,545	4,548	3,510	3,989	12,455	1,587	2,195	4,524	3,609	13,493	7,860	3,963	9,231	6,063	11,352	11,521	13,902	127,347
Persita	0	0	0	0	1,127	3,199	372	819	924	0	3,401	3,631	4,236	2,224	3,313	1,337	8,675	33,258
PSBS	578	603	112	200	103	485	100	100	97	7,561	6,587	150	100	473	2,142	1,350	2,268	23,010
PSIS	2,595	886	1,116	2,653	0	316	1,531	1,942	723	80	126	100	5,122	3,079	150	0	0	20,419
PSM	1,536	1,313	2,478	1,915	1,277	1,213	1,118	1,071	885	1,062	1,221	0	7,715	3,993	6,182	2,446	3,480	38,905
PSS	7,728	2,002	6,686	5,084	5,846	2,582	6,080	0	3,914	6,458	0	5,342	4,651	0	12,178	10,555	14,300	93,406
Semen Padang	165^{3}	8^{3}	0^{3}	1,462	6,820	5,150	9,000	6,752	4,750	6,850	3,257	5,361	7,145	9,650	3,110	9,870	12,000	91,350
League total																		1,518,611

Source: Liga 1 2024–25

Notes:

1. Malut United received sanctions in the form of holding one home match without spectators and a fine of IDR 10 million.
2. Persib received sanctions in the form of holding home matches without spectators until half of the season and a fine of IDR 295 million. The details of the sanction are the closure of the entire stadium tribunes for two consecutive matches and continued with the closure of the north and south tribunes for three consecutive matches.
3. Semen Padang received sanctions in the form of holding three home matches without spectators and a fine of IDR 100 million.

== Awards ==
=== Monthly awards ===
Month	Coach of the Month		Player of the Month		Young Player of the Month		Goal of the Month		Save of the Month		References
Month	Coach	Club	Player	Club	Player	Club	Player	Club	Player	Club	References
August	(Netherlands) Pieter Huistra	Borneo Samarinda	(Slovenia) Nermin Haljeta	PSM	(Indonesia) Made Tito	Bali United	(Japan) Ryo Matsumura	Persija	(Indonesia) Teja Paku Alam	Persib	
September	(Northern Ireland) Paul Munster	Persebaya	(Brazil) Lulinha	Madura United	(Indonesia) Made Tito	Bali United	(Argentina) Mariano Peralta	Borneo Samarinda	(Portugal) Igor Rodrigues	Persita	
October & November	(Croatia) Bojan Hodak	Persib	(Brazil) Wiliam Marcílio	Arema	(Indonesia) Gala Pagamo	Semen Padang	(Indonesia) Edo Febriansah	Persib	(Indonesia) Hilmansyah	PSM	
December	(Croatia) Bojan Hodak	Persib	(Indonesia) Egy Maulana Vikri	Dewa United	(Indonesia) Toni Firmansyah	Persebaya	(Brazil) Ciro Alves	Persib	(Brazil) Carlos Eduardo	Persija	
January	(Netherlands) Jan Olde Riekerink	Dewa United	(Brazil) Alex Martins	Dewa United	(Indonesia) Husna Al Malik	Persik	(Japan) Ryo Matsumura	Persija	(Portugal) Igor Rodrigues	Persita	
February	(Spain) Joaquín Gómez	Borneo Samarinda	(Paraguay) Diego Martínez	Malut United	(Indonesia) Arkhan Fikri	Arema	(Indonesia) Rahmat Arjuna	Bali United	(Indonesia) Reza Arya Pratama	PSM	
March	(Indonesia) Imran Nahumarury	Malut United	(Brazil) Alex Martins	Dewa United	(Indonesia) Arkhan Fikri	Arema	(Indonesia) Rizky Ridho	Persija	(Brazil) Alan Bernardon	PSS	
April	(Indonesia) Imran Nahumarury	Malut United	(Spain) Tyronne del Pino	Persib	(Indonesia) Arkhan Fikri	Arema	(Indonesia) Egy Maulana Vikri	Dewa United	(Portugal) Igor Rodrigues	Persita	
May	(Netherlands) Pieter Huistra	PSS Sleman	(Argentina) Mariano Peralta	Borneo Samarinda	(Indonesia) Dominikus Dion	PSS Sleman	(Brazil) Pablo Andrade	Persija	(Brazil) Léo Navacchio	Persik	

=== Annual awards ===
Award	Winner	Club	Ref.
Best Player	(Spain) Tyronne del Pino	Persib	
Best Coach	(Croatia) Bojan Hodak	Persib	
Best Young Player	(Indonesia) Arkhan Fikri	Arema	
Best Goal	(Indonesia) Rizky Ridho	Persija	
Fair Play Team	Malut United		

=== Team of the season ===
Pos.	Player	Team	Ref.
GK	(Portugal) Igor Rodrigues	Persita	
DF	(Brazil) Victor Luiz	PSM	
DF	(Brazil) Gustavo França	Persib	
DF	(Indonesia) Rizky Ridho	Persija	
DF	(Indonesia) Fajar Fathur Rahman	Borneo Samarinda	
MF	(Spain) Tyronne del Pino	Persib	
MF	(Argentina) Alexis Messidoro	Dewa United	
MF	(Indonesia) Egy Maulana Vikri	Dewa United	
FW	(Argentina) Mariano Peralta	Borneo Samarinda	
FW	(Brazil) Alex Martins	Dewa United	
FW	(Indonesia) Yakob Sayuri	Malut United	

== See also ==
- 2024–25 Liga 2
- 2024–25 Liga Nusantara
- 2024–25 Liga 4
- 2024 Piala Presiden
