= 2022–23 C.D. Feirense season =

C.D. Feirense
2022–23 season
- Chairman: Kunle Soname
- Manager: Rui Ferreira
- Stadium: Estádio Marcolino de Castro
- Liga Portugal 2: Pre-season
- Taça de Portugal: Pre-season
- Taça da Liga: Pre-season

The 2022–23 season is the 105th season in the history of C.D. Feirense and their fourth consecutive season in the second division of Portuguese football. The club are participating in the Liga Portugal 2, the Taça de Portugal, and the Taça da Liga. The season covers the period from 1 July 2022 to 30 June 2023.

== Players ==
As of 24 July 2022

Note: Flags indicate national team as defined under FIFA eligibility rules; some limited exceptions apply. Players may hold more than one non-FIFA nationality.

No.	Pos.	Nation	Player
1	GK	POR	Rogério Santos
3	DF	POR	João Pinto
4	MF	NGA	Anthony Shimaga
5	DF	GNB	Simão Júnior
6	MF	BRA	Washington
7	FW	GNB	Jardel Silva
8	MF	POR	Manu
9	FW	POR	João Paredes
10	MF	POR	Fábio Espinho
13	MF	POR	Samuel Teles
17	DF	BRA	Lucas Silva

No.	Pos.	Nation	Player
18	MF	CPV	João Paulo
20	MF	POR	João Tavares
21	MF	POR	André Rodrigues
23	DF	BRA	Sidney
24	DF	POR	João Oliveira
29	FW	BRA	Jorge Luiz
37	FW	NGA	Mathias Ogwuche
55	GK	POR	Igor Rodrigues
77	DF	POR	Tiago Dias
87	GK	BRA	Arthur
99	MF	NGA	Oche Ochowechi

== Pre-season and friendlies ==
Win Draw Loss Fixtures

23 July 2022 Friendly	Feirense (Portugal)	3–0	(Portugal) Vizela	Santa Maria da Feira
15:30 WEST (UTC+1)

== Competitions ==
=== Overall record ===
Competition	First match	Last match	Starting round	Record							
Competition	First match	Last match	Starting round	Pld	W	D	L	GF	GA	GD	Win %
Liga Portugal 2	August 2022	May 2023	Matchday 1	0	0	0	0	0	0	+0	—
Taça de Portugal				0	0	0	0	0	0	+0	—
Taça da Liga				0	0	0	0	0	0	+0	—
Total				0	0	0	0	0	0	+0	—

Last updated: August 2022
Source: [ Soccerway]

=== Liga Portugal 2 ===
==== League table ====
Pos	Team	Pld	W	D	L	GF	GA	GD	Pts
6	Mafra	34	12	11	11	46	49	−3	47
7	Vilafranquense	34	12	10	12	42	36	+6	46 (Note: Vilafranquense are ahead of Feirense on head-to-head points: Vilafranquense 1–0 Feirense, Feirense 1–2 Vilafranquense.)
8	Feirense	34	11	13	10	43	37	+6	46
9	Torreense	34	13	5	16	38	41	−3	44
10	Oliveirense	34	11	10	13	51	50	+1	43

Updated to match(es) played on 28 May 2023. Source: Liga Portugal 2
Rules for classification: 1) Points; 2) Head-to-head points; 3) Head-to-head goal difference; 4) Head-to-head away goals scored; 5) Goal difference; 6) Matches won; 7) Goals scored; 8) Play-off.

==== Results summary ====
Overall								Home						Away					
Pld	W	D	L	GF	GA	GD	Pts	W	D	L	GF	GA	GD	W	D	L	GF	GA	GD
0	0	0	0	0	0	0	0	0	0	0	0	0	0	0	0	0	0	0	0

Last updated: August 2022.
Source: Liga Portugal

==== Results by round ====
Round	1
Ground	
Result	
Position	

Updated to match(es) played on August 2022. Source: Liga Portugal
A = Away; H = Home; W = Win; D = Draw; L = Loss

==== Matches ====
The league fixtures were announced on 5 July 2022.
