= Papadaan derby =

Football rivalry in Indonesia

- Native name: Derbi Papadaan
- Location: Kalimantan, Indonesia
- Teams: Borneo Samarinda; Barito Putera
- First meeting: 7 August 2016; 2016 Indonesia Soccer Championship A Pusamania Borneo 4–1 Barito Putera
- Latest meeting: 16 February 2025; 2024–25 Liga 1 Borneo Samarinda 2–1 Barito Putera
- Next meeting: TBA
- Stadiums: Segiri Stadium (Borneo Samarinda); 17th May Stadium or Demang Lehman Stadium (Barito Putera)

Statistics
- Total meetings: 18
- Top scorer: Rafael Silva; Rizky Pora; Edilson Tavares (3 goals each)
- All-time series: Borneo Samarinda: 7 Draw: 6 Barito Putera: 5
- Largest victory: 7 August 2016; 2016 Indonesia Soccer Championship A Pusamania Borneo 4–1 Barito Putera
- Largest goal scoring: 18 July 2019; 2019 Liga 1 Borneo Samarinda 4–3 Barito Putera (7 goals)
- Longest unbeaten streak: 5 matches Borneo Samarinda (2023–2025)

Papadaan derby is the name given in football rivalries match between two clubs from Kalimantan, namely Borneo Samarinda (Samarinda) and Barito Putera (Banjarmasin). The term "Papadaan" comes from the Banjar language which means 'close friends' or 'brotherhood', reflecting the cultural and emotional relationship between the two clubs and their supporters. The fierce competition between both teams began in 2016 when Borneo Samarinda and Barito Putera in the 2016 Indonesia Soccer Championship A.

== History ==
The match was first nicknamed the "Papadaan derby" when Barito Putera was promoted to the 2013 Indonesia Super League season and Pusamania Borneo promoted to the 2015 Indonesia Super League season. Actually, the two clubs were scheduled to meet in the 2015 Indonesian Super League, but it was cancelled because the league was stopped due to FIFA sanctions. Since then, the derby has become a much-anticipated event for football fans in Kalimantan, as it brings together two big clubs from the region.

One of the unique values of the Papadaan derby is the spirit of sportsmanship and brotherhood that is upheld by both teams and their supporters. Despite the rivalry on the field, this match often takes place in an atmosphere of peace and mutual respect.

In the last few meetings, the results of the matches between Borneo Samarinda and Barito Putera have been quite balanced, with each clubs beating and drawing each other. This shows that the Papadaan derby is not only interesting in terms of emotion, but also competitive on the field. Overall, the Papadaan derby is a symbol of healthy rivalry and brotherhood in Indonesian football, especially on the island of Kalimantan. Until present, neither team has ever won consecutively in this derby.

The first meeting between the two teams took place on 7 August 2016 at the 2016 Indonesia Soccer Championship A. The match ended with a victory for Pusamania Borneo with a score of 4–1 over Barito Putera.

== Statistics ==
As of 24 April 2025

Competition	Played	BOR	Draw	BAR	BOR goals	BAR goals
Liga 1	14	6	4	4	18	16
Piala Indonesia	0	0	0	0	0	0
Indonesia President's Cup	2	0	2	0	0	0
Friendly match/ISC A/Menpora Cup	2	1	0	1	4	2
**Total**	18	7	6	5	22	18

=== Top goalscorers ===
Bold denote players still currently at either Borneo Samarinda or Barito Putera.

As of 24 April 2025

Player	Club	Liga 1	Piala Indonesia	Indonesia President's Cup	Friendly match/ISC A/Menpora Cup	Total
(Brazil) Rafael Silva	Barito Putera	3	0	0	0	3
**(Indonesia) Rizky Pora**	Barito Putera	3	0	0	0	3
(Brazil) Edilson Tavares	Borneo Samarinda	0	0	0	3	3
**(Brazil) Matheus Pato**	Borneo Samarinda	2	0	0	0	2
(Brazil) Marlon da Silva	Borneo Samarinda	2	0	0	0	2
(Brazil) Douglas Packer	Barito Putera	2	0	0	0	2
(Indonesia) Lerby Eliandry	Borneo Samarinda	2	0	0	0	2

== Results ==
=== All match results ===
The record counts all competitions (league, official tournament and pre-season tournament).

Competition	Date	Home team	Result	Away team	Venue	City
2016 Indonesia Soccer Championship A	7 August 2016	Pusamania Borneo	4–1	Barito Putera	Segiri Stadium	Samarinda
2016 Indonesia Soccer Championship A	1 December 2016	Barito Putera	1–0	Pusamania Borneo	17th May Stadium	Banjarmasin
2017 Indonesia President's Cup	7 February 2017	Pusamania Borneo	0–0	Barito Putera	Kapten I Wayan Dipta Stadium	Gianyar Regency
2017 Liga 1	27 June 2017	Borneo Samarinda	2–1	Barito Putera	Segiri Stadium	Samarinda
2017 Liga 1	1 October 2017	Barito Putera	2–1	Borneo Samarinda	17th May Stadium	Banjarmasin
2018 Liga 1	16 July 2018	Borneo Samarinda	2–1	Barito Putera	Segiri Stadium	Samarinda
2018 Liga 1	30 November 2018	Barito Putera	1–0	Borneo Samarinda	17th May Stadium	Banjarmasin
2019 Liga 1	18 July 2019	Borneo Samarinda	4–3	Barito Putera	Segiri Stadium	Samarinda
2019 Liga 1	31 October 2019	Barito Putera	1–0	Borneo Samarinda	Demang Lehman Stadium	Banjarbaru
2021–22 Liga 1	17 September 2021	Borneo Samarinda	1–1	Barito Putera	Wibawa Mukti Stadium	Bekasi Regency
2021–22 Liga 1	14 January 2022	Barito Putera	0–2	Borneo Samarinda	Kompyang Sujana Stadium	Denpasar
2022 Indonesia President's Cup	22 June 2022	Borneo Samarinda	0–0	Barito Putera	Segiri Stadium	Samarinda
2022–23 Liga 1	30 July 2022	Barito Putera	3–1	Borneo Samarinda	Demang Lehman Stadium	Banjarbaru
2022–23 Liga 1	21 January 2023	Borneo Samarinda	0–0	Barito Putera	Segiri Stadium	Samarinda
2023–24 Liga 1	21 July 2023	Borneo Samarinda	2–1	Barito Putera	Segiri Stadium	Samarinda
2023–24 Liga 1	2 December 2023	Barito Putera	0–0	Borneo Samarinda	Demang Lehman Stadium	Banjarbaru
2024–25 Liga 1	23 September 2024	Barito Putera	1–1	Borneo Samarinda	Sultan Agung Stadium	Bantul Regency
2024–25 Liga 1	16 February 2025	Borneo Samarinda	2–1	Barito Putera	Segiri Stadium	Samarinda

== See also ==
- List of association football club rivalries in Indonesia
