= Alan Bernardon =

Brazilian footballer

Personal information
- Full name: Alan José Bernardon
- Date of birth: 22 June 1994 (age 32)
- Place of birth: Medianeira, Brazil
- Height: 2.01 m (6 ft 7 in)
- Position: Goalkeeper

Team information
- Current team: Java United
- Number: 94

Youth career
- 2010–2013: Londrina
- 2014: Cruzeiro

Senior career*
Years	Team	Apps	(Gls)
2015–2018	Cruzeiro	0	(0)
2016–2017	→ Londrina (loan)	2	(0)
2018–2021	Londrina	4	(0)
2019	→ Vila Nova (loan)	0	(0)
2022–2023	Água Santa	0	(0)
2023–2024	XV de Piracicaba	1	(0)
2023	→ Paysandu (loan)	1	(0)
2024	Botafogo	0	(0)
2024	Cascavel	2	(0)
2024–2025	PSS Sleman	33	(0)
2025–	Java United	14	(0)
- * Club domestic league appearances and goals as of 7 March 2026

Alan José Bernardon (born 22 June 1994), simpply known as Alan, is a Brazilian professional footballer who plays as a goalkeeper for Super League club Java United.

== Club career ==
Born in Medianeira, Paraná, Brazil, he joined several local Brazilian clubs. He decided to go abroad for the first time to Indonesia and joined Liga 1 side PSS Sleman in the 2024–25 season. During his career in Brazil, Alan only made a total of 17 appearances in all competitions. Previously, he played for Cascavel in 2024 Campeonato Brasileiro Série D and only played two matches or 180 minutes of play.

=== PSS Sleman ===
On 1 July 2024, PSS Sleman confirmed the signing of Alan for a free transfer. Alan made his debut for PSS Sleman on 11 August 2024, in 1–0 away lose over Persebaya Surabaya. Despite this, he successfully recorded 8 saves. On 16 September 2024, he keeping a first clean sheet in a 0–0 draw over Bali United. On 20 October 2024, he picked up his first win with PSS Sleman in his eighth appearances and as well as recording his second clean sheet in a 0–3 away win over Barito Putera.

=== Malut United ===
On 22 July 2025, Alan signed a contract with Malut United for the 2025–26 campaign, joining former teammate Vico Duarte.

== Honours ==
Individual

- Liga 1 Save of the Month: March 2025
