= Tri Setiawan =

Indonesian professional footballer

Personal information
- Full name: Tri Setiawan
- Date of birth: 20 May 2004 (age 22)
- Place of birth: Parigi Moutong, Indonesia
- Height: 1.78 m (5 ft 10 in)
- Position: Defensive midfielder

Team information
- Current team: Java United
- Number: 68

Youth career
- 2015: Gala Siswa Indonesia

Senior career*
Years	Team	Apps	(Gls)
2020–2023	Persipal Palu	1	(0)
2023–2025	PSIS Semarang	47	(5)
2025–	Java United	16	(0)
- * Club domestic league appearances and goals as of 19 September 2026

Tri Setiawan (born 20 May 2004) is an Indonesian professional footballer who plays as a defensive midfielder for Super League club Java United.

== Early life ==
Born in 2004, Tri was born in Parigi Moutong, Central Sulawesi.

== Club career ==
=== Youth career ===
As a youth player, Tri joined Gala Siswa Indonesia.

=== Persipal Palu ===
In July 2020, Tri is contracted by Persipal Palu to sail in Liga 3.

=== PSIS Semarang ===
In May 2023, Tri recruited by PSIS Semarang for midfield squad depth. Tri made his debut on 20 August 2023 in a match against Persib Bandung at the Jatiditri Stadium, Semarang.

== International career ==
In April 2023 Tri was called up the Indonesia U22 for the training centre in preparation for 2023 SEA Games.

== Career statistics ==
=== Club ===
As of 19 September 2026

Club	Season	League			Cup		Continental		Other		Total	
Club	Season	Division	Apps	Goals	Apps	Goals	Apps	Goals	Apps	Goals	Apps	Goals
Persipal Palu	2022–23	Liga 2	1	0	0	0	–		0	0	1	0
PSIS Semarang	2023–24	Liga 1	18	3	0	0	–		0	0	18	3
PSIS Semarang	2024–25	Liga 1	29	2	0	0	–		0	0	29	2
Java United	2025–26	Super League	13	0	0	0	–		0	0	13	0
Java United	2026–27	Super League	3	0	0	0	–		0	0	3	0
Career total			64	5	0	0	0	0	0	0	64	5
