= Diego Martínez (footballer, born 1995) =

Paraguayan footballer

Personal information
- Full name: Diego Máximo Martínez
- Date of birth: 17 October 1995 (age 31)
- Place of birth: Asunción, Paraguay
- Height: 1.84 m (6 ft 0 in)
- Position: Forward

Team information
- Current team: Alianza Universidad
- Number: 9

Senior career*
Years	Team	Apps	(Gls)
2017–2018	Caacupé		
2018–2019	Independiente CG	1	(0)
2021–2023	Resistencia	55	(8)
2023–2024	General Caballero	42	(7)
2024–2025	Malut United	29	(10)
2025–	Alianza Universidad	1	(0)
- * Club domestic league appearances and goals as of 26 July 2025

Diego Máximo Martínez (born 17 October 1995), commonly known as Chino, is a Paraguayan professional footballer who plays as a forward for Peruvian Primera División club Alianza Universidad.

== Career ==
=== Paraguay ===
Chino began his career at Caacupé Football Club before joining Independiente CG, where he made one appearance against Sportivo Luqueño in the 2018 Primera División Apertura. He then played for Resistencia for two seasons in 2022 and 2023, scoring 8 goals and providing 3 assists in 55 matches.

In 2023, Chino joined General Caballero and competed in the 2023 Primera División Clausura, scoring 3 goals in 20 appearances. He continued playing in the 2024 Primera División Apertura, where he recorded 4 goals in 22 matches.

=== Indonesia ===
==== Malut United ====
Malut United officially announced the signing of Diego Martínez on 1 July 2024 through their official Instagram account. Chino became the fifth foreign player signed by Malut United during their debut season in Liga 1 for the 2024–25 campaign. On 29 June 2025, he officially left Malut United.

== Honours ==
Individual

- Liga 1 Player of the Month: February 2025
