= Ridho Syuhada =

Indonesian footballer

Personal information
- Full name: Ridho Syuhada Putra
- Date of birth: 18 June 2004 (age 22)
- Place of birth: Kuantan Singingi, Indonesia
- Height: 1.71 m (5 ft 7 in)
- Position: Midfielder

Team information
- Current team: Java United
- Number: 56

Youth career
- 2012–2015: SSB Gasela Lamandau
- 2015–2016: SSB Kobar Muda
- 2019–2020: PSIS Semarang
- 2020–2022: Garuda Select
- 2022: PSIS Semarang

Senior career*
Years	Team	Apps	(Gls)
2022–2025	PSIS Semarang	58	(3)
2023–2024	→ PSMS Medan (loan)	13	(0)
2025–	Java United	15	(0)
- * Club domestic league appearances and goals as of 23 May 2026

Ridho Syuhada Putra (born 18 June 2004) is an Indonesian professional footballer who plays as a midfielder for Super League club Java United.

== Club career ==
=== PSIS Semarang ===
He was signed for PSIS Semarang to play in Liga 1 in the 2022 season. Ridho made his debut and scored a debut goal on 5 December 2022 in a match against Madura United at the Manahan Stadium, Surakarta. On 9 June 2025, Ridho officially left PSIS Semarang.

== Career statistics ==
=== Club ===
As of 6 February 2026

Club	Season	League			Cup		Continental		Other		Total	
Club	Season	Division	Apps	Goals	Apps	Goals	Apps	Goals	Apps	Goals	Apps	Goals
PSIS Semarang	2022–23	Liga 1	22	1	0	0	–		0	0	22	1
PSIS Semarang	2023–24	Liga 1	4	0	0	0	–		0	0	4	0
PSIS Semarang	2024–25	Liga 1	32	2	0	0	–		0	0	32	2
PSMS Medan (loan)	2023–24	Liga 2	13	0	0	0	–		0	0	13	0
Malut United	2025–26	Super League	10	0	0	0	–		0	0	10	0
Career total			81	3	0	0	0	0	0	0	81	3
