= Joaquín Gómez (football manager) =

Spanish football manager

Personal information
- Full name: Joaquín Gómez Blasco
- Date of birth: 25 July 1986 (age 40)
- Place of birth: Sotillo de la Adrada, Spain

Managerial career
- Years: Team
- 2010–2013: Brighton & Hove Albion (youth)
- 2021: HIFK
- 2022–2023: SJK
- 2024: Volos
- 2025: Borneo Samarinda
- 2025: Anorthosis Famagusta
- 2025: Kanchanaburi Power
- 2026: Gimnástica Segoviana

Joaquín Gómez Blasco (born 25 July 1986) is a Spanish professional football manager. He was most recently the assistant manager of Ekstraklasa club Pogoń Szczecin.

== Managerial career ==
Born in Sotillo de la Adrada, Community of Madrid, Gómez started studying football and coaching at the Universidad Camilo José Cela in Madrid, where he completed two master's degrees in sports science and coaching. He completed the first one in 2010 and the other one in 2015. He also has a UEFA Pro license, which he completed in 2010. Gómez was one of the youngest people to receive the UEFA Pro license, at the age of 24.

In Madrid, Gómez coached various school teams, who played in the lower divisions of the Spanish football hierarchy. At 23, he made the decision to move to England, in pursuit of a professional career in football. He, and his wife, moved to Brighton and in the beginning, he worked in a hotel and a café, while learning the language. At the end of 2010, he received his first full time coaching job, within the Brighton & Hove Albion academy.

At Brighton, Gómez started working with the clubs U7-team, but was gradually appointed more and more responsibilities. In 2013 he was approached by Óscar García, a fellow Spaniard, to become the first team performance coach in 2013. The following season Gómez joined former Finland national Sami Hyypiä as assistant manager, before leaving at the end of the 2014–15 season to become Derby County's head of tactical analysis. At Derby County he worked with Paul Clement, who had experience from Chelsea FC, Paris Saint Germain and Real Madrid.

For the 2015–2016 season, Gómez joined Luton Town in the EFL League Two and teamed up with Nathan Jones, who had been the assistant manager under Sami Hyypiä, as well as manager after Hyypiä was sacked by Brighton. During the 2016–2017 season Luton finished fourth in their division, and the following season Luton gained promotion to league one. After a good start to the 2018–2019 season, Jones was appointed head manager for Stoke City and Gómez followed him there.

In May 2019, Gómez joined the Finland U21 national team, at a recommendation from Antti Niemi with whom he had worked with at Brighton. He continued working at Stoke City at the same time, until Jones was fired in the November 2019, after a poor start to the season. After this Gómez moved to FC Cartagena in the Spanish Segunda División B.

At the beginning of the year 2020, Gómez signed a contract with SJK Seinäjoki, to become their assistant coach under Jani Honkavaara. After a poor start to the season, SJK ended up in seventh place after a strong autumn.

On 11 January 2021, Gómez joined HIFK Fotboll as head coach. On 8 November, he returned to SJK as head coach, eventually spending two seasons in Seinäjoki.

After a one-season stint as an assistant coach of Al Qadsiah, Gómez was named the head coach of Super League Greece club Volos in 2024. He was sacked after just five league games in the end of September 2024.

On 16 January 2025, Gómez was appointed as the new coach of Indonesian Liga 1 club Borneo Samarinda, replacing Pieter Huistra.

On 25 June 2026, after managing Gimnástica Segoviana in his home country in the first half of the year, Gómez was appointed assistant manager of Ekstraklasa club Pogoń Szczecin under newly appointed Óscar García. On 13 August, a month and a half after his appointment, he left the club citing family reasons.

== Managerial statistics ==
As of match played 3 May 2026

Managerial record by team and tenure
Team	Nat.	From	To	Record					Ref.
Team	Nat.	From	To	G	W	D	L	Win %	Ref.
HIFK	(Finland)	11 January 2021	31 December 2021	32	12	8	12	37.50	
SJK Seinäjoki	(Finland)	1 January 2022	3 November 2023	74	30	15	29	40.54	
Volos	(Greece)	1 July 2024	25 September 2024	5	1	0	4	20.00	
Borneo Samarinda	(Indonesia)	16 January 2025	1 June 2025	18	10	3	5	55.56	
Anorthosis Famagusta	(Cyprus)	1 July 2025	3 September 2025	2	0	1	1	0.00	
Kanchanaburi Power	(Thailand)	4 October 2025	27 November 2025	6	1	3	2	16.67	
Gimnástica Segoviana	(Spain)	21 January 2026	25 June 2026	15	4	4	7	26.67	
Career total				152	58	34	60	38.16	

== Honours ==
Individual

- Liga 1 Coach of the Month: February 2025
