= Arthur (footballer, born August 1999) =

Brazilian footballer

Personal information
- Full name: Arthur Augusto da Silva
- Date of birth: 29 August 1999 (age 27)
- Place of birth: Caldas Novas, Brazil
- Height: 1.92 m (6 ft 4 in)
- Position: Goalkeeper

Team information
- Current team: Araz-Naxçıvan

Youth career
- 2014–2018: Desportivo Brasil

Senior career*
| Years | Team | Apps | (Gls) |
| 2018–2020 | Desportivo Brasil | 15 | (0) |
| 2018 | → Atlético Tubarão (loan) | 13 | (0) |
| 2020–2021 | Oliveirense | 21 | (0) |
| 2021–2023 | Feirense | 21 | (1) |
| 2023–2025 | Oliveirense | 29 | (0) |
| 2025–2026 | Semen Padang | 39 | (0) |
| 2026– | Araz-Naxçıvan | 0 | (0) |
- * Club domestic league appearances and goals as of 29 April 2026

Arthur Augusto da Silva (born 29 August 1999), simply known as Arthur, is a Brazilian professional footballer who plays as a goalkeeper for Azerbaijan Premier League club Araz-Naxçıvan.

== Club career ==
On 9 July 2021, he joined Feirense.

On 18 October 2022, in a Liga Portugal 2 match against Moreirense, Arthur scored an equalizer directly from a goal kick. However, two minutes later, he made a mistake which led to an opposition goal and an eventual 1–2 defeat.

On 10 July 2023, Arthur returned to Oliveirense, where he had played in the 2020–21 season.

== Career statistics ==
=== Club ===
As of 29 April 2026.

| Club | Season | League | | | National cup | | League cup | | Other | | Total | |
| Club | Season | Division | Apps | Goals | Apps | Goals | Apps | Goals | Apps | Goals | Apps | Goals |
|---|---|---|---|---|---|---|---|---|---|---|---|---|
| Desportivo Brasil | 2019 | — | | | 0 | 0 | — | | 15 (Note: Appearances in the Copa Paulista) | 0 | 15 | 0 |
| Desportivo Brasil | 2020 | — | | | 0 | 0 | — | | 0 | 0 | 0 | 0 |
| Desportivo Brasil | Total | | 0 | 0 | 0 | 0 | — | | 15 | 0 | 15 | 0 |
| Oliveirense | 2020–21 | Liga Portugal 2 | 21 | 0 | 0 | 0 | 0 | 0 | — | | 21 | 0 |
| Feirense | 2021–22 | Liga Portugal 2 | 5 | 0 | 1 | 0 | 0 | 0 | — | | 6 | 0 |
| Feirense | 2022–23 | Liga Portugal 2 | 16 | 1 | 0 | 0 | 1 | 0 | — | | 17 | 1 |
| Feirense | Total | | 42 | 1 | 1 | 0 | 1 | 0 | — | | 44 | 1 |
| Oliveirense | 2023–24 | Liga Portugal 2 | 19 | 0 | 0 | 0 | 0 | 0 | — | | 19 | 0 |
| Oliveirense | 2024–25 | Liga Portugal 2 | 10 | 0 | 2 | 0 | 0 | 0 | — | | 12 | 0 |
| Oliveirense | Total | | 29 | 0 | 2 | 0 | 0 | 0 | — | | 31 | 0 |
| Semen Padang | 2024–25 | Liga 1 | 17 | 0 | 0 | 0 | 0 | 0 | — | | 17 | 0 |
| Semen Padang | 2025–26 | Super League | 22 | 0 | — | | — | | — | | 22 | 0 |
| Semen Padang | Total | | 39 | 0 | 0 | 0 | 0 | 0 | — | | 39 | 0 |
| Career total | | | 110 | 1 | 3 | 0 | 1 | 0 | 15 | 0 | 129 | 1 |
