= João Tavares =

Portuguese footballer

Personal information
- Full name: João Tavares Almeida
- Date of birth: 12 December 1998 (age 27)
- Place of birth: Santa Maria da Feira, Portugal
- Height: 1.75 m (5 ft 9 in)
- Position: Midfielder

Team information
- Current team: AEL Limassol
- Number: 20

Youth career
- 2006–2009: Milheiroense
- 2009–2010: Leixões
- 2010–2011: Porto
- 2011–2012: Dragon Force
- 2012–2013: Porto
- 2013–2014: Padroense
- 2014–2015: Benfica
- 2015–2017: Feirense

Senior career*
Years	Team	Apps	(Gls)
2017–2023	Feirense	82	(3)
2019	→ Braga B (loan)	12	(1)
2019–2020	→ Mafra (loan)	15	(1)
2023–2025	Marítimo	18	(0)
2024–25	Belenenses	15	(1)
2025–2026	Olympiakos Nicosia	25	(3)
2026–	AEL Limassol	8	(0)

International career
2013	Portugal U15	2	(0)
2014	Portugal U16	12	(0)
2014	Portugal U17	5	(1)
- * Club domestic league appearances and goals as of 7 November 2026

João Tavares Almeida (born 12 December 1998) is a Portuguese professional footballer who play as a midfielder for Cypriot First Division club AEL Limassol.

== Football career ==
On 11 November 2017, Tavares made his professional debut with Feirense in a 2017–18 Taça da Liga match against Moreirense. Tavares left Feirense at the end of the 2022–23 season.

On 1 August 2023, recently relegated to Liga Portugal 2 side Marítimo announced the signing of Tavares on a two-year deal.
