= Chechu Meneses =

Spanish footballer (born 1995)

Personal information
- Full name: Jesús María Meneses Sabater
- Date of birth: 4 January 1995 (age 31)
- Place of birth: Palma de Mallorca, Spain
- Height: 1.88 m (6 ft 2 in)
- Position: Centre-back

Team information
- Current team: Ghajnsielem F.C.
- Number: 27

Youth career
- 2013–2014: Mallorca B
- 2014–2015: Atlético Madrid C
- 2015–2016: Formentera
- 2016–2017: Numancia B

Senior career*
Years	Team	Apps	(Gls)
2017–2018	Extremadura	10	(0)
2018	Peña Deportiva	9	(1)
2018–2019	Amorebieta	5	(0)
2019–2020	Compostela	16	(0)
2020–2021	Leiknir	12	(5)
2021–2022	Vestri	21	(3)
2022–2023	Sant Julià	17	(3)
2023–2024	Atlètic d'Escaldes	21	(1)
2024–2025	Barito Putera	14	(0)
2025–2026	Java United	19	(2)
2026-2026	→ Persik Kediri (loan)	6	(0)
2026	Ghajnsielem F.C.	3	(2)
- * Club domestic league appearances and goals as of 23 May 2026

Jesús María Meneses Sabater (born 4 January 1995), known as Chechu Meneses, is a Spanish professional footballer who plays as a centre-back.

== Club career ==
He began his career at clubs based in the Balearic Islands, in the youth category he played for teams such as CD San Francisco and eventually for Mallorca's U19 team in División de Honor Juvenil de Fútbol.

At the end of his formative years, in the 2014/2015 season, he joined Atlético Madrid C in the Tercera División and the following season he joined SD Formentera, where he finished second in the league and played in the play-offs. and promotion to Segunda División B and reached the second round of the Copa del Rey.

In the following season, he joined Numancia B of the Tercera División, he stayed with the team for one year, and in the 2017–18 season he joined Extremadura. Until the winter window transfer, he signed for Peña Deportiva of Segunda División B until the end of the season. Ahead of the 2018-19 season, he joined Amorebieta also in the Segunda División B. In January 2019, Meneses signed for Compostela.

=== Leiknir Reykjavík ===
In February 2020, he decided to go abroad for the first time to Iceland with joined 1. deild karla club Leiknir. He made his league debut for the club on 20 June 2020 as a starter in a 3–0 away lose over Knattspyrnufélagið Fram.

=== Vestri ===
in 2021, until the end of the season, Meneses was part of the first team of Vestri, where he had reached fifth place in the league and the semifinals of the Icelandic Men's Football Cup.

=== Sant Julià ===
In 2022–23 season, he move to Andorra and signed a contract with Sant Julià. He made his league debut for the club on 11 September 2022 as a starter in a 2–2 draw over Penya Encarnada d'Andorra. On 18 December 2022, Meneses scored his first league goal for the club in a 3–2 home lose against Penya Encarnada.
