= Lucas Morelatto =

Brazilian footballer

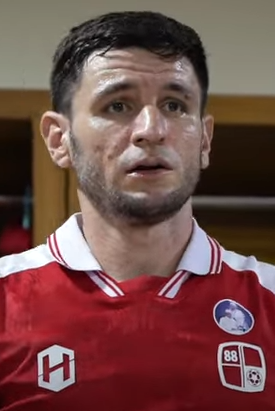
- Morelatto with Barito Putera in 2025.

Personal information
- Full name: Lucas Morelatto da Cruz
- Date of birth: 25 May 1994 (age 32)
- Place of birth: Franco da Rocha, Brazil
- Height: 1.80 m (5 ft 11 in)
- Position: Midfielder

Youth career
- –2013: Paulista
- 2013–2015: Palmeiras

Senior career*
Years	Team	Apps	(Gls)
2013–2015	Palmeiras B	0	(0)
2015	→ Boa (loan)	0	(0)
2015–2017	Estoril	0	(0)
2015–2016	→ Olhanense (loan)	17	(0)
2016–2017	→ Mafra (loan)	24	(5)
2017–2018	Mafra	28	(5)
2018–2019	Vilafranquense	25	(0)
2019	Fátima	10	(1)
2020–2022	Iwate Grulla Morioka	79	(9)
2023	Nantong Zhiyun	29	(2)
2024–2025	Barito Putera	31	(9)
2025	Al-Muharraq		
2026	Persijap Jepara	10	(0)
- * Club domestic league appearances and goals

Lucas Morelatto da Cruz (born 25 May 1994) is a Brazilian professional footballer who plays as a midfielder.

== Club career ==
Morelatto started his career with São Paulo state side Paulista before joining Palmeiras in 2013. After a season with Palmeiras' 'B' team, and time spent on loan with Boa Esporte, Morelatto joined Portuguese side Estoril, and was immediately loaned to LigaPro side Olhanense. After one season with the Leões de Olhão, Morelatto was loaned to third division side C.D. Mafra. On 19 March 2017, he scored a hat-trick in Mafra's 14 to 1 win against Naval 1º de Maio. In March 2023, Morelatto joined Chinese Super League club Nantong Zhiyun.

== Career statistics ==
=== Club ===
As of 24 May 2025.

Club	Season	League			State League		National Cup		League Cup		Other		Total	
Club	Season	Division	Apps	Goals	Apps	Goals	Apps	Goals	Apps	Goals	Apps	Goals	Apps	Goals
Palmeiras B	2013	–			8 (Note: Appearances in the Campeonato Paulista A3)	0	0	0	–		–		8	0
Boa (loan)	2015	Série B	0	0	1 (Note: Appearances in the Campeonato Mineiro)	0	1 (Note: Appearances in the Copa do Brasil)	0	–		–		2	0
Olhanense (loan)	2015–16	LigaPro	17	0	–		2 (Note: Appearances in the Taça de Portugal)	0	0	0	–		19	0
Mafra (loan)	2016–17	Campeonato de Portugal	24	5	–		1	0	–		–		25	5
Mafra	2017–18	Campeonato de Portugal	33	5	–		2	0	–		6 (Note: Appearances in the Campeonato de Portugal promotion play/offs)	0	41	5
Vilafranquense	2018–19	Campeonato de Portugal	25	0	–		1	0	–		–		26	0
Fátima	2019–20	Campeonato de Portugal	10	1	–		2	0	0	0	–		12	1
Iwate Grulla Morioka	2020	J3 League	30	5	–		–		–		–		30	5
Iwate Grulla Morioka	2021	J3 League	21	1	–		1 (Note: Appearances in the Emperor's Cup)	0	–		–		22	1
Iwate Grulla Morioka	2022	J2 League	28	3	–		1	1	–		–		29	4
Iwate Grulla Morioka	Total		79	9	0	0	2	1	0	0	0	0	81	10
Nantong Zhiyun	2023	Chinese Super League	29	2	–		2 (Note: Appearances in the Chinese FA Cup)	0	–		–		31	2
Barito Putera	2024–25	Liga 1	31	9	–		0	0	–		–		31	9
Career total			248	31	9	0	13	1	0	0	6	0	276	32
