= Armando Oropa =

Indonesian Footballer

Personal information
- Full name: Armando Obet Oropa
- Date of birth: 31 August 2003 (age 23)
- Place of birth: Serui, Indonesia
- Height: 1.78 m (5 ft 10 in)
- Position: Winger

Team information
- Current team: Java United
- Number: 77

Youth career
- SSB Sapta Marga Saireri

Senior career*
Years	Team	Apps	(Gls)
2022–2023	PSBS Biak	5	(0)
2023–2024	Kalteng Putra	15	(4)
2024–2025	PSBS Biak	16	(1)
2025–2026	Semen Padang	17	(1)
2026–	Java United	0	(0)
- * Club domestic league appearances and goals as of 23 May 2026

Armando Obet Oropa (born 31 August 2003) is an Indonesian professional footballer who plays as a winger for Super League club Java United.

== International career ==
On 25 November 2024, Oropa received a called-up to the preliminary squad to the Indonesia national team for the 2024 ASEAN Championship.
