= Williams Lugo =

Venezuelan footballer

Personal information
- Full name: Williams José Lugo Ladera
- Date of birth: 16 December 1996 (age 29)
- Place of birth: Caracas, Venezuela
- Height: 1.76 m (5 ft 9 in)
- Position: Attacking midfielder

Team information
- Current team: Universidad Central

Youth career
- –2019: Yaracuy

Senior career*
Years	Team	Apps	(Gls)
2019	Portuguesa	27	(0)
2020–2021	Deportivo La Guaira	20	(3)
2021–2024	Puerto Cabello	97	(6)
2024–2025	PSBS Biak	30	(6)
2025–2026	Persik Kediri	13	(1)
2026	Persipura Jayapura	10	(2)
2026–	Universidad Central	0	(0)
- * Club domestic league appearances and goals as of 8 May 2026

Williams José Lugo Ladera (born 16 December 1996), is a Venezuelan professional footballer who plays as an attacking midfielder for Universidad Central.

== Club career ==
Born in Venezuela, he joined several local Venezuelan clubs, and decided to go abroad for the first time to Indonesia and joined Liga 1 (Indonesia) side PSBS Biak in the 2024–25 season, on loan from Academia Puerto Cabello.

=== PSBS Biak ===
On 3 June 2024, Lugo was signed for PSBS Biak and played in Liga 1 in 2024–25 season. He made his league debut for PSBS on 9 August 2024 in a 4–1 away lose against Persib Bandung. On 3 November 2024, Lugo scored his first league goal for PSBS in a 2–0 win over Bali United. On 8 December 2024, he added his second league goal for the club in a 0–3 away win against Barito Putera, with the result, securing PSBS's position at the sixth of the league table.

=== Persik Kediri ===
On 30 August 2025, Super League club Persik Kediri announced the signing of Lugo.
