= Léo Navacchio =

Brazilian footballer

Personal information
- Full name: Leonardo Navacchio
- Date of birth: 28 December 1992 (age 33)
- Place of birth: Piacatu, Brazil
- Height: 1.92 m (6 ft 4 in)
- Position: Goalkeeper

Team information
- Current team: Persik Kediri
- Number: 1

Youth career
- 2009–2013: São Paulo

Senior career*
Years	Team	Apps	(Gls)
2012–2015	São Paulo	0	(0)
2013	→ Sertãozinho (loan)	0	(0)
2014	→ Oeste (loan)	0	(0)
2015	→ América de Natal (loan)	0	(0)
2015–2022	Portimonense	13	(0)
2019–2020	→ Penafiel (loan)	6	(0)
2020–2022	→ Covilhã (loan)	63	(0)
2022–2023	Torreense	1	(0)
2023–2024	Tondela	6	(0)
2024–	Persik Kediri	50	(0)
- * Club domestic league appearances and goals as of 6 April 2026

Leonardo "Léo" Navacchio (born 28 December 1992) is a Brazilian professional footballer who plays as a goalkeeper for Super League club Persik Kediri.

== Club career ==
He made his professional debut in the Segunda Liga for Portimonense on 2 April 2016 in a game against Leixões.

On 10 August 2022, Navacchio signed with Torreense.

On 1 August 2023, Liga Portugal 2 side Tondela announced the free signing of Navacchio on a one-year contract.
