= Menpora Cup =

- Organiser(s): PSSI
- Founded: 2013; 13 years ago
- Teams: 8 (2013); 18 (2021)
- Current champions: Persija Jakarta
- Most championships: Arema; Persija Jakarta (1 time each)
- Broadcaster(s): Indosiar, Vidio, K-Vision (2021)
- 2021 Menpora Cup

The Menpora Cup is a football tournament organized by the Ministry of Youth and Sports of the Republic of Indonesia and PSSI. This tournament was first held in 2013 as an international pre-season tournament (Indonesian International Tournament Menpora Cup). The champion in the first edition of the Menpora Cup was Arema who in the final defeated the Australian club , Central Coast Mariners.

The name Menpora Cup was used again as a national pre-season tournament in 2021. This tournament was attended by all Liga 1 teams.

== Details ==
=== Single-legged final ===
| Year | Final Venue | Champion | Match Results | Second place | Final Stadium |
|---|---|---|---|---|---|
| 2013 | Malang | Arema | 2–1 | Central Coast Mariners | Kanjuruhan Stadium |

=== Two-legged final ===
| Year | Final Venue | Team 1 | Match Results | Team 2 | Final Stadium |
|---|---|---|---|---|---|
| 2021 | Solo | Persija Jakarta | 2–0 | Persib Bandung | Manahan Stadium |
| 2021 | Solo | Persib Bandung | 1–2 | Persija Jakarta | Manahan Stadium |
| 2021 | aggr. 1–4 | | | | |
