= Sotillo de la Adrada =

- municipality
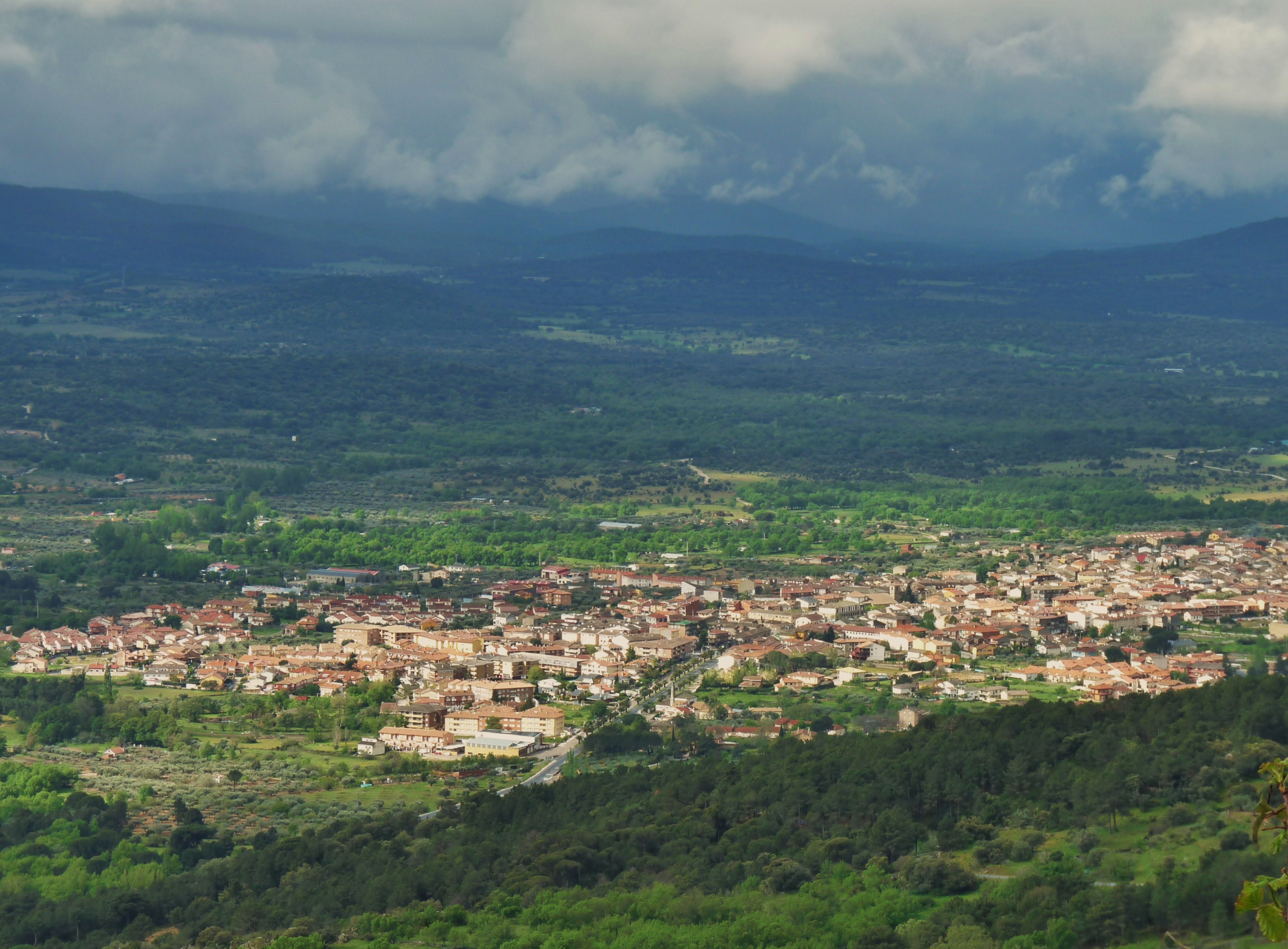
- Panoramic view of Sotillo de la Adrada

- Flag Coat of arms

- Location in Spain. Sotillo de la Adrada (Spain)
- Coordinates: 40°17′36″N 4°34′58″W
- Country: Spain
- Autonomous community: Castile and León
- Province: Ávila

Area
  - Total: 43 km^{2} (17 sq mi)

Population (2025-01-01)
  - Total: 5,081
  - Density: 120/km^{2} (310/sq mi)
- Time zone: UTC+1 (CET)
  - Summer (DST): UTC+2 (CEST)
- Website: Official website

Sotillo de la Adrada is a municipality located in the province of Ávila, Castile and León, Spain.

== Population ==
Historical population
Year	Pop.	±% p.a.
2023	4,870	—
2024	5,003	+2.73%
2025	5,081	+1.56%
Source: INE
