= Jonata Machado =

Brazilian footballer

Personal information
- Full name: Jonata Felipe Machado
- Date of birth: 7 June 1999 (age 27)
- Place of birth: Santa Cruz das Palmeiras, Brazil
- Height: 1.83 m (6 ft 0 in)
- Position: Defensive midfielder

Team information
- Current team: Java United
- Number: 5

Youth career
- 2017: Botafogo-SP

Senior career*
Years	Team	Apps	(Gls)
2018–2021	Botafogo-SP	28	(0)
2021–2022	Lokomotiv Sofia	2	(0)
2022	Marcílio Dias	7	(0)
2022	Flamengo de Arcoverde	5	(0)
2023–2024	Wilstermann	33	(0)
2024–2025	PSBS Biak	31	(0)
2025–2026	Al-Tai	25	(2)
2026–	Java United	2	(0)
- * Club domestic league appearances and goals as of 19 September 2026

Jonata Felipe Machado (born 7 June 1999) is a Brazilian professional footballer who plays as a defensive midfielder for Super League club Java United.

He came through the youth ranks at the Botafogo-SP, featuring in the 2018 Copa São Paulo de Futebol Júnior with a goal against Cruzeiro Futebol Clube (Distrito Federal). He made his senior national league debut in the first match of the 2019 season, against Vitória.

On 10 September 2025, Machado joined Saudi FDL club Al-Tai.
