= Anthony Shimaga =

Nigerian footballer (born 1997)

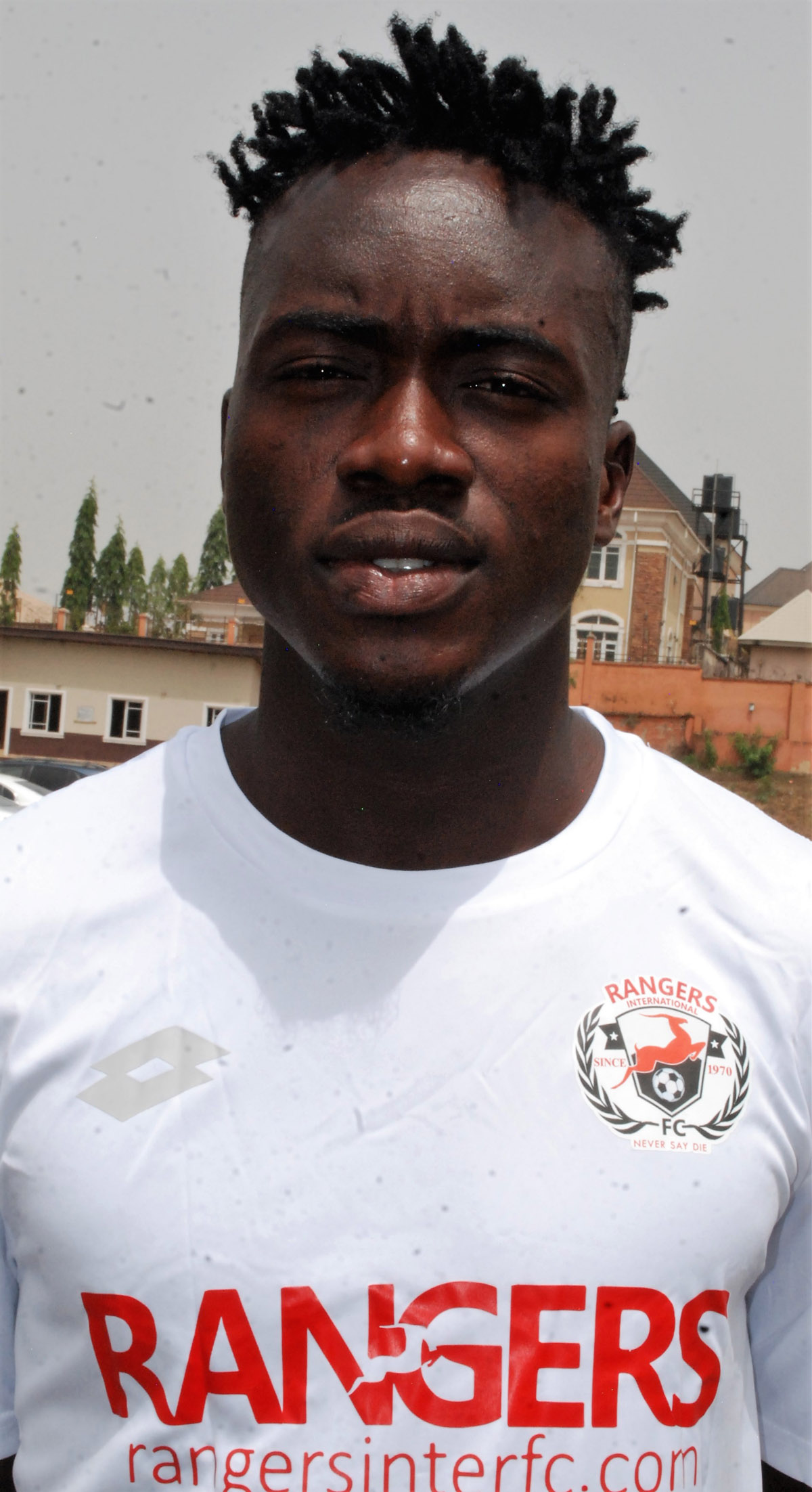
- 2010 Nobert Okoli, Enugu

Personal information
- Full name: Anthony Msonter Shimaga
- Date of birth: 24 August 1997 (age 29)
- Place of birth: Gboko, Nigeria
- Height: 1.90 m (6 ft 3 in)
- Positions: Centre-back; defensive midfielder

Team information
- Current team: Academia Puerto Cabello

Senior career*
Years	Team	Apps	(Gls)
2015	BCC Lions		
2016	Lobi Stars		
2017–2018	Ifeanyi Ubah	43	(0)
2019–2021	Enugu Rangers	75	(0)
2021–2025	Feirense	39	(0)
2025–	Academia Puerto Cabello	0	(0)

International career^{‡}
2019–	Nigeria	2	(0)
- * Club domestic league appearances and goals as of 9 March 2025 ‡ National team caps and goals as of 14:44, 2 November 2021 (UTC)

Anthony Msonter Shimaga (born 24 August 1997) is a Nigerian professional footballer who plays as a centre-back or defensive midfielder for Venezuelan club Academia Puerto Cabello.

== Career statistics ==
=== Club ===
Club	Season	League			National cup		Continental		Other		Total	
Club	Season	Division	Apps	Goals	Apps	Goals	Apps	Goals	Apps	Goals	Apps	Goals
Feirense	2021–22	Liga Portugal 2	0	0	2 (Note: Appearances in the Taça de Portugal)	0	–		0	0	2	0
Career total			0	0	2	0	0	0	0	0	2	0

=== International ===
As of

Appearances and goals by national team and year
National team	Year	Apps	Goals
Nigeria	2019	1	0
Nigeria	2021	1	0
Total		2	0
