= Igor Rodrigues =

Portuguese footballer

Personal information
- Full name: Igor Carreira Rodrigues
- Date of birth: 5 May 1995 (age 31)
- Place of birth: Leiria, Portugal
- Height: 1.91 m (6 ft 3 in)
- Position: Goalkeeper

Team information
- Current team: Persita Tangerang
- Number: 29

Youth career
- 2003–2008: Leiria e Marrazes
- 2008–2009: União Leiria
- 2009–2011: Leiria e Marrazes
- 2011–2012: Pombal
- 2012–2013: Leixões
- 2013–2014: Tocha

Senior career*
Years	Team	Apps	(Gls)
2013–2014	Tocha	3	(0)
2014–2015	Oliveira do Hospital	13	(0)
2015–2016	Sporting Covilhã B	20	(0)
2016–2017	Sporting Covilhã	33	(0)
2017–2020	Benfica	0	(0)
2017–2018	→ Sporting Covilhã (loan)	29	(0)
2018–2019	→ Estoril (loan)	3	(0)
2019–2020	→ Chaves (loan)	10	(0)
2020–2023	Feirense	24	(0)
2023–2024	Kapaz	17	(0)
2024–	Persita Tangerang	68	(0)
- * Club domestic league appearances and goals as of 22:30, 31 October 2026 (UTC)

Igor Carreira Rodrigues (born 5 May 1995) is a Portuguese professional footballer who plays as a goalkeeper for Super League club Persita Tangerang.

== Club career ==
Born in Leiria, Rodrigues made his professional debut with Sporting da Covilhã in a 2016–17 Taça da Liga match against Aves on 31 July 2016.

== Honours ==
Individual

- Liga 1/Super League Save of the Month: September 2024, January 2025, April 2025, December 2025
- Liga 1 Team of the Season: 2024–25
