= Bruno da Cruz =

Brazilian footballer (born 1996)

Personal information
- Full name: Bruno da Cruz
- Date of birth: 27 May 1996 (age 30)
- Place of birth: São Paulo, Brazil
- Height: 1.87 m (6 ft 2 in)
- Position: Attacking midfielder

Team information
- Current team: Tarxien Rainbows
- Number: 8

Senior career*
Years	Team	Apps	(Gls)
2014–2015	Itabaiana	3	(0)
2015–2016	Thonon Evian	5	(1)
2017–2018	Skopje	8	(0)
2019	EC São Bernardo	10	(0)
2020	São Bernardo	0	(0)
2020	Boa Esporte	2	(0)
2021	Nacional	4	(0)
2022	Grêmio Anápolis	10	(0)
2022–2023	Kerċem Ajax	19	(5)
2023–2024	Għajnsielem	19	(7)
2024	Persita Tangerang	9	(0)
2025–	Tarxien Rainbows	1	(0)
- * Club domestic league appearances and goals as of 6 October 2025

Bruno da Cruz (born 27 May 1996) is a Brazilian professional footballer who plays as an attacking midfileder for Maltese Premier League club Tarxien Rainbows.
