= Mathias Ogwuche =

Nigerian footballer

Personal information
- Full name: Mathias Adah Ogwuche
- Date of birth: 14 April 1998 (age 28)
- Height: 1.86 m (6 ft 1 in)
- Position: Forward

Team information
- Current team: Remo Stars

Senior career*
Years	Team	Apps	(Gls)
2019–	Remo Stars		
2021–2022	→ Feirense (loan)	3	(0)
- * Club domestic league appearances and goals as of 18 September 2022 ‡ National team caps and goals as of 14:44, 2 November 2021 (UTC)

Mathias Adah Ogwuche (born 14 April 1998) is a Nigerian footballer who plays as a forward for Remo Stars.

He spent time in Norway on trials with Lillestrøm SK in 2017, as well as Notodden FK and Hamkam in early 2018.

== Career statistics ==
=== Club ===
As of 2 November 2021.

Club	Season	League			Cup		Continental		Other		Total	
Club	Season	Division	Apps	Goals	Apps	Goals	Apps	Goals	Apps	Goals	Apps	Goals
Feirense	2021–22	Liga Portugal 2	2	0	1 (Note: Appearances in the Taça de Portugal)	0	–		0	0	3	0
Career total			2	0	1	0	0	0	0	0	3	0
