= Rizky Pora =

Indonesian footballer

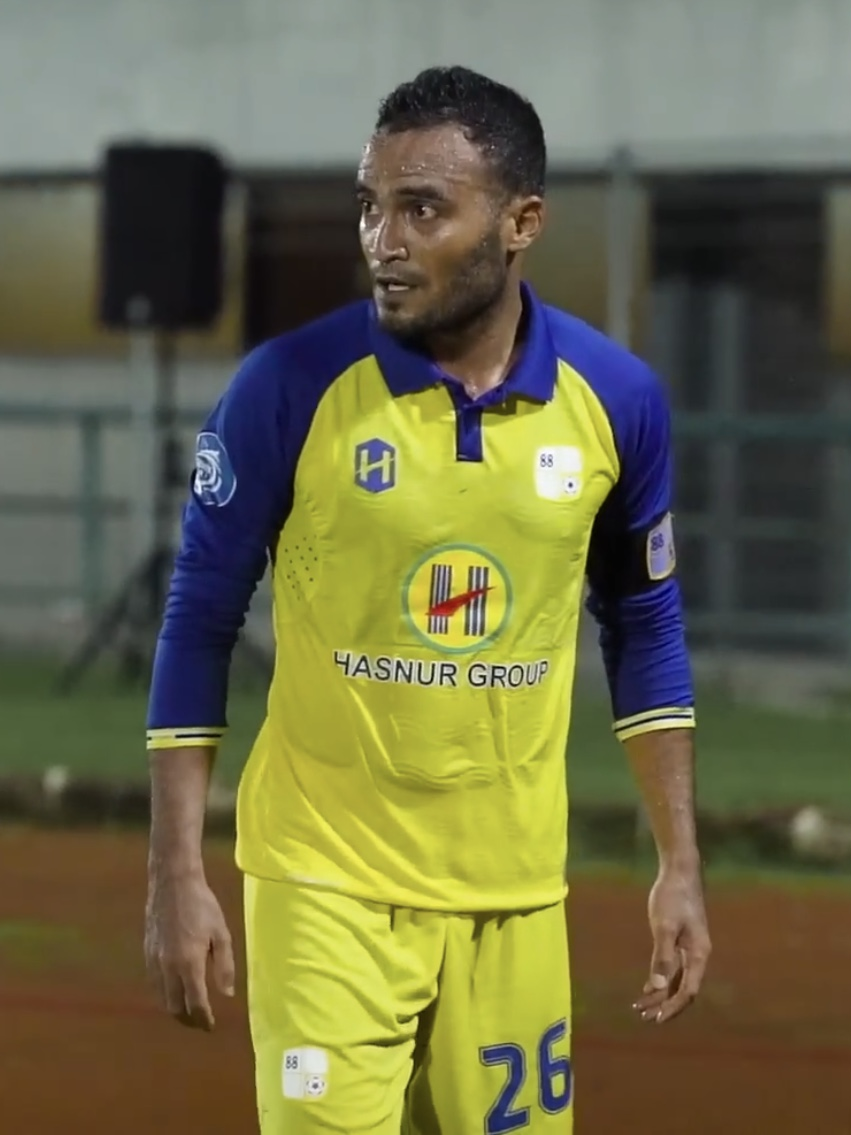
- Pora playing for Barito Putera in 2023

Personal information
- Full name: Rizky Rizaldi Pora
- Date of birth: 22 November 1989 (age 36)
- Place of birth: Ternate, Indonesia
- Height: 1.70 m (5 ft 7 in)
- Positions: Winger; left-back

Team information
- Current team: Barito Putera
- Number: 26

Youth career
- 2008–2010: Persambong Sula

Senior career*
| Years | Team | Apps | (Gls) |
| 2010–2013 | Persita Tangerang | 47 | (3) |
| 2013– | Barito Putera | 272 | (32) |

International career
| 2014–2019 | Indonesia | 26 | (1) |
Medal record
Men's football
Representing Indonesia
AFF Championship
| Runner-up | 2016 Myanmar & Philippines | Team |
- * Club domestic league appearances and goals as of 25 April 2026

Rizky Rizaldi Pora (born 22 November 1989) is an Indonesian professional footballer who plays as a winger or left-back for Championship club Barito Putera.

== Club career ==
=== Barito Putera (2016) ===
Rizky certainly remains in PS Barito Putera. he made his debut in 2016 season against Bali United In first week 2016 Indonesia Soccer Championship A. he made his first goal in the 45th minute against Persija Jakarta in fifth week.

On the sixth week, he scored again when against Persipura Jayapura in the 20th minute. Although the end result lost 4–5.

On eighth week against Persela Lamongan, he scored with a free kick in the 7th minutes.

== International career ==
He made his debut with Indonesia on 21 June 2014 in a friendly against Pakistan.

== Career statistics ==
=== International ===
As of match played 19 November 2019

Appearances and goals by national team and year
| National team | Year | Apps | Goals |
|---|---|---|---|
| Indonesia | 2014 | 7 | 0 |
| Indonesia | 2016 | 10 | 1 |
| Indonesia | 2017 | 2 | 0 |
| Indonesia | 2018 | 4 | 0 |
| Indonesia | 2019 | 3 | 0 |
| Total | | 26 | 1 |

=== International goals ===
Scores and results list Indonesia's goal tally first.

| # | Date | Venue | Opponent | Score | Result | Competition |
|---|---|---|---|---|---|---|
| 1. | 14 December 2016 | Pakansari Stadium, Bogor | Thailand | 1–1 | 2–1 | 2016 AFF Championship |

== Honours ==
=== International ===
Indonesia

- AFF Championship runner-up: 2016

=== Individual ===
- AFF Championship Best XI: 2016
- ASEAN Football Federation Best XI: 2017
