= Java United F.C. =

Association football team in Indonesia

Java United
- Full name: Java United Football Club
- Nickname: Kepodang Emas (The Golden Orioles)
- Short name: JVU
- Founded: 2016; 10 years ago (as Putra Jombang); 2021; 5 years ago (as Putra Delta Sidoarjo); 28 May 2023; 3 years ago (as Malut United); 3 August 2026; 3 months ago (as Java United)
- Ground: Jatidiri Stadium
- Capacity: 18,000
- President: Sofyan Lestaluhu
- Head coach: Fábio Lefundes
- League: Super League
- 2025–26: Super League, 6th of 18
Home colours	Away colours	Third colours

Java United Football Club, formerly known as Malut United Football Club, is an Indonesian professional football club based in Semarang, Central Java. The club currently plays in the Super League.

== History ==
At that time the club was called Putra Jombang, after being acquired, the club changed its name to Putra Delta Sidoarjo. Putra Delta Sidoarjo was established in 2021, they made club debut into Indonesian football by joining the third-tier league Liga 3 in 2021.

On 5 November 2021, Putra Delta Sidoarjo made their first league match debut in a 3–0 win against Assyabaab Bangil at the Gelora Delta Stadium, in the next match, they faced a club from Surabaya Arek Suroboyo. three days later, in that match, they had their second match in a 7–0 big win against Arek Suroboyo. On 14 November, they closed the match in the group stage of the 2021 Liga 3 East Java zone in a 6–0 big win against Persikoba Batu, with this result, they qualified for round of 32 as winners Group K. After a 2–0 win over Mojosari Putra in the round of 32 and a 3–0 win over Madura FC in the round of 16. They qualified for the quarter-finals to face Persewangi Banyuwangi, but in that match, they had to lose to Persewangi Banyuwangi 1–2, as a result, failed to qualify for the semifinals of 2021 Liga 3 East Java, but still qualified for the national round of Liga 3, because in the East Java zone there were a quota of 8 clubs.

In the national round of 2021–22 Liga 3, they managed to win Group D and qualify for the round of 32. They successfully beat Benteng HB (6–1), Gasliko 50 Kota (4–1), and drew against Persikutim East Kutai (2–2), moving on to the round of 32, Putra Delta Sidoarjo is still undefeated. They managed to come out as winners of Group R and advance to the round of 16 national round of the Liga 3. In the round of 16, they won 3–1 over Persikasi Bekasi, won over Persida Sidoarjo (4–1), and drew 1–1 against Karo United. Their step for promotion in Liga 2 next season is determined in the round of 16 phase. Joined in Group CC, they succeeded in becoming the group winners and at the same time ensuring themselves to move up the caste next season. In addition, this position also brings them to appear in the semi-finals of the Liga 3.

In the semi-final match, they will face Mataram Utama on 27 March 2022, and in that match, they managed to qualify for the final after winning 6–1. However, On 30 March 2022, in the final match, Putra Delta Sidoarjo failed to win because they lost to Karo United in the final on penalties which ended with a score of 4–2. with this result, they became runner-up. One of the players from Putra Delta Sidoarjo, Mochamad Adam Malik became the top scorer in 2021–22 Liga 3 with a score of 11 goals.

On 30 January 2023, mining tycoon David Glenn successfully took over Putra Delta Sidoarjo, with the ownership transferred to Malut Maju Sejahtera and Glenn's company PT. Mineral Trobos Group. Glenn then relocated the club to the town of Sofifi, with the aims of improving football within a region known for producing talented players but lacking clubs in the top two tiers of domestic football. Club was renaming as Maluku Utara United Football Club in the process.

To prepare for the Indonesian 2023–24 Liga 2 season, Malut United signed a total of 13 players, most of whom were natives of North Maluku, as well as enlisting Imran Nahumarury as their inaugural head coach. The club will play their home games at the Gelora Kie Raha Stadium in Ternate whilst planning to build their own stadium in Sofifi. Malut United would finish the league in 3rd place by defeating Persiraja Banda Aceh at the promotion play-off, thus Malut United will compete in the top division, Liga 1 for the first time.

In the 2024–25 Liga 1, Malut United coming as a debutant team, had a successful season by finished in third place. Initially they would have competed in the 2025–26 ASEAN Club Championship but AFF rejected their request (via PSSI) where only the champion and runner up qualified for the competition.

In 2026, Malut United announced they would change their name to Jateng United, later they prepared Java United as another option. This name change was approved in the 2026 PSSI Ordinary Congress with Malut United's name changing to Java United.

== Name and logo changes ==
=== Logo history ===
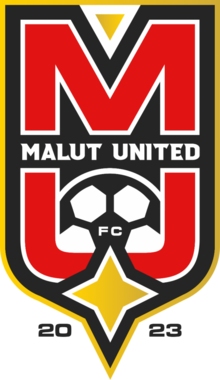
Malut United (2023–2026)

=== Naming history ===
- Putra Jombang (2016–2021)
- Putra Delta Sidoarjo (2021–2023)
- Malut United (2023–2026)
- Java United (2026–present)

== Players ==
=== Current squad ===
As of 8 October 2026

Note: Flags indicate national team as defined under FIFA eligibility rules; some limited exceptions apply. Players may hold more than one non-FIFA nationality.

No.	Pos.	Nation	Player
1	GK	BRA	Jorge Meurer
3	DF	BRA	Cleylton
4	DF	BRA	Gustavo França (captain)
5	MF	BRA	Jonata Machado
6	DF	SEN	Christian Gomis
7	FW	BRA	Ciro Alves
8	MF	JPN	Kei Hirose
9	FW	BRA	Kaio Nunes
10	MF	BRA	Lukas Brambilla
11	FW	IDN	Yabes Roni
12	MF	IDN	Yakob Sayuri
14	FW	IDN	Riyan Ardiansyah
17	FW	BRA	David da Silva
19	MF	IDN	Taufik Rustam
21	FW	IDN	Frets Butuan
23	DF	IDN	Yance Sayuri
28	MF	BRA	Vander Tavares

No.	Pos.	Nation	Player
33	GK	IDN	Miswar Saputra
35	DF	IDN	Ariel Kurung
56	MF	IDN	Ridho Syuhada
67	MF	IDN	Syahrul Ramadhani
68	MF	IDN	Tri Setiawan
70	FW	BRA	Gustavo (on loan from Persija Jakarta)
77	FW	IDN	Armando Oropa
80	FW	IDN	Aprilian Bernadus
85	DF	IDN	Muhamad Firly
88	MF	IDN	Fahreza Sudin
93	GK	IDN	Cyrus Margono (on loan from Persija Jakarta)
96	DF	IDN	Iksan Lestaluhu
99	FW	IDN	Rifael Salmon

== Coaching staff ==
As of October 2026

Position	Staff
Team manager	(Indonesia) Zainudin Umasangaji
Technical director	(Indonesia) Achmad Resal Octavian
Head coach	(Brazil) Fábio Lefundes
Assistant coaches	(Indonesia) Ricardo Salampessy
Assistant coaches	(Brazil) Fabio Oliveira
Assistant coaches	(Brazil) Vinicius Argirita
Goalkeeper coach	(Brazil) Josmiro de Goes
Assistant goalkeeper coach	(Indonesia) Joko Ribowo
Fitness coaches	(Brazil) Joao Pedro Rayol
Fitness coaches	(Indonesia) Ramdhan Fitrayadi
Analyst	(Indonesia) Haris Oscar

== Season-by-season records ==
As Putra Jombang

Season	League/Division	Tms.	Pos.	Piala Indonesia	ACLE	ACL 2	ACGL	ACC
2017	Liga 3	32	Eliminated in Provincial round	–	–	–	–	–
2018	Liga 3	32	Eliminated in Provincial round	–	–	–	–	–
2019	Liga 3	32	Eliminated in Regional round	–	–	–	–	–

As Putra Delta Sidoarjo

Season	League/Division	Tms.	Pos.	Piala Indonesia	ACLE	ACL 2	ACGL	ACC
2021–22	Liga 3	64	2	–	–	–	–	–
2022–23	Liga 2	28	did not finish	–	–	–	–	–

As Malut United

Season	League/Division	Tms.	Pos.	Piala Indonesia	ACLE	ACL 2	ACGL	ACC
2023–24	Liga 2	28	3	–	–	–	–	–
2024–25	Liga 1	18	3	–	–	–	–	–
2025–26	Super League	18	6	–	–	–	–	–

As Java United

Season	League/Division	Tms.	Pos.	Piala Indonesia	I-League Cup	ACLE	ACL 2	ACGL	ACC
2026–27	Super League	18	TBD	–	TBD	–	–	–	–

== Honours ==
=== Putra Delta Sidoarjo ===
- Liga 3
  - Runners-up (1): 2021–22

=== Malut United ===
- Liga 1
  - Third place (1): 2024–25
- Liga 2
  - Third place (1): 2023–24
