= Kiss (surname) =

Kiss (Hungarian pronunciation: [ˈkiʃ]) is a very common Hungarian surname. Like Kis (surname), it was derived from kis, meaning "small" and applied as a nickname for a person of small stature or the younger of two bearers of the same personal name. Notable people with the surname include:

- Ágnes Kiss (born 2005), Hungarian sprint canoeist
- Alexandru Kiss (born 1959), Romanian footballer
- Antal Kiss (1935–2021), Hungarian athlete
- August Kiss (1802–1865), German sculptor
- Balázs Kiss, multiple people
- Béla Kiss (1877–1916), Hungarian serial killer
- Bence Kiss (born 1999), Hungarian footballer
- Cássia Kiss (born 1958), Brazilian actress
- Dániel Kiss, multiple people
- Dora Kiss (born 1986), Hungarian tennis player and actress
- Edmund Kiss (1886–1960), German pseudo-archaeologist
- Elizabeth Kiss (born 1961), American academic
- Gergely Kiss (born 1977), Hungarian water polo player
- Géza Kiss (1882–1952), Hungarian freestyle swimmer
- György Kiss, multiple people
- Ioan Kiss (1901–2006), Romanian footballer
- István Kiss, multiple people
- Iuliu Kiss (born 1924), Romanian footballer
- John Z. Kiss (born 1960), American biologist
- József Kiss, multiple people
- Károly Kiss, multiple people
- Kristina Kiss (born 1981), Canadian soccer player
- Lajos Kiss, multiple people
- László Kiss, multiple people
- Les Kiss (born 1964), Australian rugby league footballer of the 1980s and 1990s
- Manyi Kiss (1911–1971), Hungarian actress
- Nándor Kiss (born 1993), Serbian politician
- Nicky Kiss (fl. 1977–1990), British rugby league footballer of the 1970s and 1980s
- Peter Kiss or Péter Kiss, multiple people
- Robert S. Kiss (1957–2021), American politician
- Sándor Kiss, multiple people
  - Sándor M. Kiss (1943–2025), Hungarian historian
- Tamás Kiss, multiple people
  - Tamás Pál Kiss (born 1991), Hungarian racing driver
- Zoltán Kiss, multiple people

== See also ==
- Kis (disambiguation)
- Kish (disambiguation)
