= Kis =

Kis or KIS may refer to:

== Places ==
- Kiş, Khojavend, Azerbaijan
- Kiş, Shaki, Azerbaijan
- Kish (Sumer) (Sumerian: Kiš), an ancient city in Sumer
- Kis, Babol Kenar, a village in Mazandaran Province, Iran
- Kis, Bandpey-ye Gharbi, a village in Mazandaran Province, Iran
- Kis, Bandpey-ye Sharqi, a village in Mazandaran Province, Iran

== Schools ==
- KIS International School, Bangkok, Thailand
- Kazakhstan International School, Almaty, Kazakhstan
- Kodaikanal International School, Kodaikanal, Tamil Nadu, India
- Korean International School in Shenzhen

== Transport ==
- Kin Sang stop, Hong Kong, MTR station code
- Kissimmee (Amtrak station), Florida, USA, Amtrak code
- Kisumu Airport (IATA: KIS), Kenya

== Other ==
- Kis (surname)
- KIS (weapon), a Polish World War II machine pistol
- Cusae, a city in Upper Egypt
- Kis FM, an Indonesian radio station
- Kis language, spoken in Papua New Guinea
- Kaspersky Internet Security
- Knowbot Information Service
- Köpings IS, a Swedish sports club
- Kosovo Is Serbia, a movement promoting that Kosovo is part of Serbia
- Keep It Simple, an alternate form of the KISS principle
- -kis-, from the Greek word, κις, meaning "times", forming a Greek multiple numerical prefix
- Kim Il Sung, the former supreme leader of North Korea

== See also ==
- Kiss (disambiguation)
