= Kopiko =

Kopiko may refer to:

- Kopiko (confectionery), a brand of coffee confectioneries produced in Southeast Asia
- Kopiko, common name for Psychotria mariniana tree, a species of the family Rubiaceae endemic to Hawaii
