= Kojatice =

Kojatice may refer to:

- Kojatice, Prešov District, village in Prešov District, Slovakia
- Kojatice (Třebíč District), village in Třebíč District, Czech Republic
