= Mayora Indah =

Indonesian multinational food and beverage company

PT Mayora Indah Tbk
- Formerly: United Brand (1977–1990)
- Type: Public
- Traded as: IDX: MYOR
- Industry: Food; Beverage candy
- Founded: 17 February 1977; 49 years ago
- Founder: Jogi Hendra Atmadja
- Headquarters: Jakarta, Indonesia
- Area served: Worldwide
- Key people: Jogi Hendra Atmadja (President Commissioner/Founder); Andre Sukendra Atmadja (President Director)
- Products: Biscuits; Candies; Wafers; Chocolates; Cereals; Coffee; Milk; Detergent; Instant noodles; Porridge; Tea; Mineral water; Energy drinks
- Revenue: ▲ Rp 30,669 trillion (2022)
- Operating income: ▲ Rp 2,433 trillion (2022)
- Net income: ▲ Rp 2.008 trillion (2022)
- Total assets: ▲ Rp 22.276 trillion (2022)
- Total equity: ▲ Rp 12.835 trillion (2022)
- Owners: Unita Branindo (32.93%); Mayora Dhana Utama (26.14%); Jogi Hendra Atmadja (25.24%)
- Number of employees: 15,532 (2022)
- Subsidiaries: PT Sinar Pangan Barat; PT Sinar Pangan Timur; PT Torabika Eka Semesta; Mayora Nederland B.V. Mayora India Pvt. Ltd.
- Website: www.mayora.com

PT Mayora Indah Tbk (formerly PT United Brand), also known as the Mayora Group or simply called Mayora, is a large Indonesian multinational food and beverage company headquartered in Jakarta. It was founded and established on 17 February 1977 by Jogi Hendra Atmadja and built its first factory branch in Tangerang, Banten (at the time, the Province was not established and was still a part of West Java until 17 October 2000 by 23 years and 8 months later). The company is recognized as the world's largest coffee candy manufacturer through the Kopiko brand.

The company has been listed on the Jakarta Stock Exchange (now Indonesia Stock Exchange) since 4 July 1990. PT Unita Branindo holds 32.93% of shares.

== History ==
Mayora's history dates back to 1948, when a family of Chinese immigrants to Indonesia began making biscuits in their home kitchen, with Marie Biscuits as their first product. In 1976, the family moved to Kampung Bali in Jakarta and began selling Roma brand biscuits.

The company was formally established in 1977 as United Brand, opening its first factory in Tangerang, west of the Indonesian capital Jakarta. Kopiko, a coffee-flavored candy, was launched in 1982. In 1984, United Brand entered the chocolate segment with the launch of its own chocolate bar brand, Beng-Beng, followed by Choki-Choki, a brand of chocolate paste launched in 1985. The company went public in 1990 and expanded its presence to other Asian countries. Since then, United Brand was renamed as Mayora Indah. Also in 1990, the company launched their own instant coffee brand, Torabika.

In 1992, Mayora entered the nutritious drink segment with the introduction of Energen. In 1994, the company's former head office in Tomang Raya, Jakarta was served as the central hub for all operations. In 1995, the company entered the instant noodles segment with the launch of Migelas, when they became one of the leading instant noodle brands in Indonesia.

In 2011, Mayora entered the beverage market with the introduction of Teh Pucuk Harum, a ready-to-drink tea brand, followed by Le Minerale, a brand of bottled water launched in 2015.

In November 2017, Mayora's Kopiko snacks were photographed at the International Space Station as part of a Thanksgiving dinner held by astronauts. In 2019, Mayora founder and head Jogi Hendra Atmadja was listed by Forbes as the 10th richest person in Indonesia, with wealth of $3 billion.

== Products ==
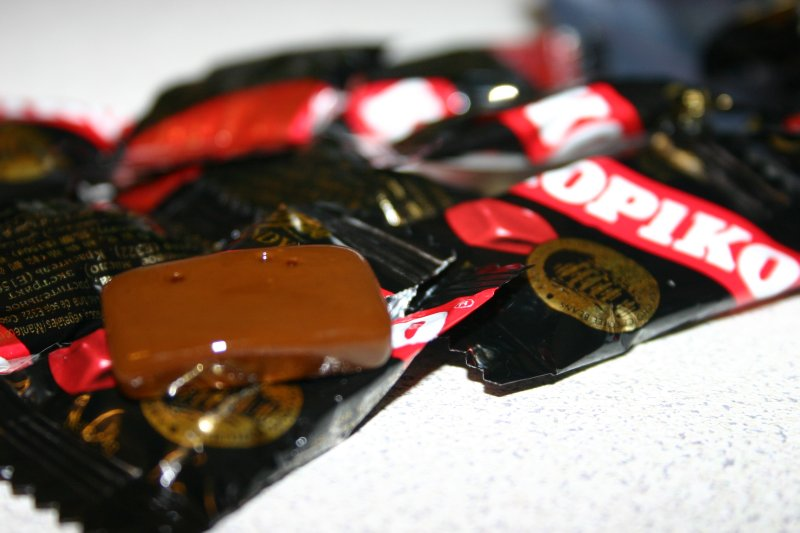
Kopiko candy

Mayora Group produces several product lines, namely:

- Biscuit: Better, Danisa, Roma Arden, Roma Biskuit Kelapa, Roma Chess Kress, Roma Coffee Joy, Roma Malkist, Roma Marie Gold, Roma Marie Susu, Roma Sari Gandum, Roma Sandwichi, Slai O'lai
- Candy: Kopiko, Kis, Fres Mint, Plonk, Tamarin, Juizy Milk
- Wafer: Astor, Beng-Beng, Superstar, Wafello, Zuperrr Keju (Cal Cheese)
- Chocolate: Choki-Choki, Danisa
- Cereal: Energen
- Coffee: Kopi Ayam Merak, Kopiko Brown Coffee, Kopiko Blanca, Kopiko White Mocca, Torabika Duo, Torabika Oke, Torabika 3 in 1, Torabika Jahe Susu, Torabika Cappuccino, Tora Moka, Tora Susu, Kopiko Black, Kopiko Cappuccino, Kopiko L.A (low acid), Kopiko Double Cups, Kopiko Café Mocha, Tora Cafe, Torabika Creamy Latte
- Chocolate Drink: Champion, Drink Beng-Beng
- Porridge: Super Bubur
- Milk: Tujuh Kurma, Collagena
- Instant Noodle: Migelas, Bakmi Mewah, Mie Oven
- Beverage: Kopiko Lucky Day (formerly Kopiko 78 °C, partner between Indonesia, Thailand and the Philippines), Teh Pucuk Harum, Q Guava, Kopiko Iced Blanca, Kopiko Iced Black, Kopiko Iced Brown, Le Minerale
- Home care: Gentle Gen, Kilau Nipis
- Pasta: Mie Oven

Mayora also produced several Meiji Seika brands.

== Markets ==
=== Asia ===
- Indonesia
- Malaysia
- Singapore
- Brunei
- Philippines
- Thailand
- Cambodia
- Laos
- Vietnam
- Timor-Leste
- Myanmar
- China
- Hong Kong
- Macau
- Taiwan
- Japan
- South Korea
- India
- Nepal
- Bangladesh
- Pakistan
- Sri Lanka
- Maldives
- Kazakhstan
- Uzbekistan
- Turkmenistan

=== Middle East ===
- Saudi Arabia
- United Arab Emirates
- Bahrain
- Qatar
- Kuwait
- Iran
- Iraq
- Jordan
- Oman
- Lebanon
- Turkey
- Egypt
- Morocco
- Oman
- Yemen
- Libya
- Georgia
- Azerbaijan
- Armenia
- Turkey

=== Oceania ===
- Australia
- New Zealand
- Papua New Guinea
- Fiji
- Marshall Islands

=== Africa ===
- South Africa
- Ghana
- Kenya
- Madagascar
- Mauritius
- Nigeria
- Sierra Leone
- Burkina Faso
- Ivory Coast
- Togo
- Benin
- Uganda
- Tanzania
- Zambia
- Angola
- Botswana
- Zimbabwe
- Mozambique
- Mauritius
- Senegal
- Cameroon
- Ethiopia
- DR Congo
- Gabon

=== Europe ===
- United Kingdom
- France
- Italy
- Germany
- Spain
- Portugal
- Sweden
- Poland
- Switzerland
- Latvia
- Denmark
- Austria
- Greece
- Netherlands
- Estonia
- Lithuania
- Belarus
- Ukraine
- Moldova
- Hungary
- Romania
- Bulgaria
- Czech Republic
- Slovakia
- Finland
- Norway
- Ireland

=== North America ===
- United States
- Canada
- Mexico
- Haiti
- Dominican Republic
- Cuba
- Jamaica
- Dominica
- Guatemala
- Panama
- Trinidad and Tobago
- Barbados
- Belize
- El Salvador
- Honduras
- Costa Rica
- Nicaragua

=== South America ===
- Argentina
- Brazil
- Suriname
- Peru
- Chile
- Colombia
- Uruguay
- Venezuela

== Controversies ==
=== Bankers Trust case ===
During the 1997-98 Asian financial crisis, when the value of the Indonesian rupiah plummeted, Mayora defaulted on payment obligations to Bankers Trust International. BTI had sold derivative trading contracts to Mayora under International Swaps and Derivatives Association Master Agreements (ISDA Agreements), which contained an arbitration clause. Unwilling to pay its obligations, Mayora sued BTI at South Jakarta District Court, arguing that the agreements were similar to gambling and therefore against Indonesian law. BTI took the case to the London Court of International Arbitration (LCIA), which ruled in favor of BTI, but South Jakarta District Court ruled in favor of Mayora. BTI appealed and the Indonesian Supreme Court upheld the ruling in 2000 and again in 2003, leaving BTI with no further legal recourse.

=== Free candy for pregnant mothers ===
According to author Martin Lindstrom's book Brandwashed: Tricks Companies Use To Manipulate Our Minds And Persuade Us To Buy, doctors in the Philippines were given Kopiko candies to hand out to pregnant mothers, and the company later introduced a coffee product which tasted like the candy and became popular with children.

=== Mineral water factory dispute ===
In 2014, residents of Pandeglang regency in Indonesia's Banten province began staging protests with the aim of expelling PT Tirta Fresindo Jaya, a subsidiary of Mayora Group, which planned to build a Le Minerale bottled water factory in Cadasari subdistrict that would tap groundwater from natural springs in the area. Residents argued that they needed groundwater for their daily supplies and irrigation needs. The protests culminated in February 2017 when the factory site was attacked, delaying construction activities. Protesters claimed that their aspirations had been ignored by local officials and politicians. In response to the initial protests, then-Pandeglang regent Erwin Kurtubi issued a letter in November 2014 to the president director of PT Tirta Fresindo Jaya, requesting that they "stop investment activities." However, the letter had no legal force, and the company's activities continued. After Fresindo drilled and tested groundwater in early 2016, locals complained that their water reservoirs had dwindled and agricultural irrigation was disrupted. Residents also alleged that a community consent letter for the factory contained falsified signatures. Those whose names were collected for signatures reportedly received Rp1 million in cash, with Rp200,000 deducted per person for a mediator. Mayora spokesman Sribugo Suratmo stated that the community's concerns were unreasonable because the factory had obtained all necessary permits from the local government and would not interfere with surface wells. The company also argued the factory would benefit the local economy and attract further investment.

=== School children caffeine overdose ===
On September 30, 2016, 34 high school students at Concord Technical Institute in Cebu City in the Philippines were briefly hospitalized for caffeine overdose after they consumed free samples of Kopiko 78°C bottled drink offered to them. Additionally, some students had reportedly consumed more than three or four bottles each. Doctors said children over 12 should only consume up to 70 milligrams of caffeine daily, whereas each bottle of Kopiko 78°C contained 150 milligrams of caffeine. A city councilor commented that the distributor of the free samples may be held liable for giving out coffee to minors.

== See also ==
- Kopiko (brand)
