= Le Minerale =

Bottled drinking water products from Indonesia

- Product type: Drinking water
- Current owner: PT Tirta Fresindo Jaya (Mayora Group)
- Country: Indonesia
- Introduced: 2015
- Website: www.leminerale.com

Le Minerale is a brand of bottled drinking water from Indonesia produced by PT Tirta Fresindo Jaya, a subsidiary of Mayora Group. The product was launched in 2015.

Le Minerale competes with several other bottled drinking water brands in the Indonesian market, particularly Danone's Aqua, the leading brand in the industry. The company has also expanded its presence to international markets, including the Philippines, Singapore, Brunei, and Malaysia.

== See also ==
- Kopiko (brand)
