= Carl Frankl Hauser =

- Born: December 27, 1847; Jánosháza, Hungary
- Died: April 14, 1915 (aged 67); Manhattan, New York
- Spouse: Adelaide Blumenthal (m. 1890)

Carl Frankl Hauser (December 27, 1847 – April 14, 1915) was an American humorist, writer, and actor. He is referred to by Jacob Rader Marcus as "the Jewish Mark Twain."

== Biography ==
Carl Frankl Hauser was born into a Jewish family in Jánosháza, Hungary, where he received a rudimentary secular and Talmudic education. After moving to Vienna to pursue business, he obtained a scholarship to the Theater Academy, where he began his training in the performing arts.

In 1872, Hauser joined the Vienna Stadttheater, with which he remained for over two years. In 1875, he became a member of the Duke of Meiningen's theatrical troupe in Berlin. Later that same year, he emigrated to the United States, settling in New York City. He performed with the Germania Theater for one season. In 1879–81 he was engaged as an actor at the Thalia Theater.

Hauser served as associate editor of the German-language edition of Puck in 1876–79 and 1881–92. In 1892, he founded the German humorous weekly Hallo, which he managed for about two years. He then joined the staff of the New Yorker Herold, to which he was a regular contributor for another two years.

Hauser was active in political reform movements as a member of the German-American Reform Union and the Citizens' Union.

== Literary contributions ==
Hauser was the author of Twenty-Five Years in America: Recollections of a Humorous Nature, published in 1900. He founded the Bürger- und Bauern-Kalender ('Citizen and Farmer Almanac'), an annual publication launched in 1897. He also wrote the libretto for Madeleine, the Rose of Champagne and contributed to six burlesques. His writings for Puck included the series "Letters of Dobbljew Zizzesbeisser."
