= Johann Kiss de Kissáros =

Hungarian noble military officer

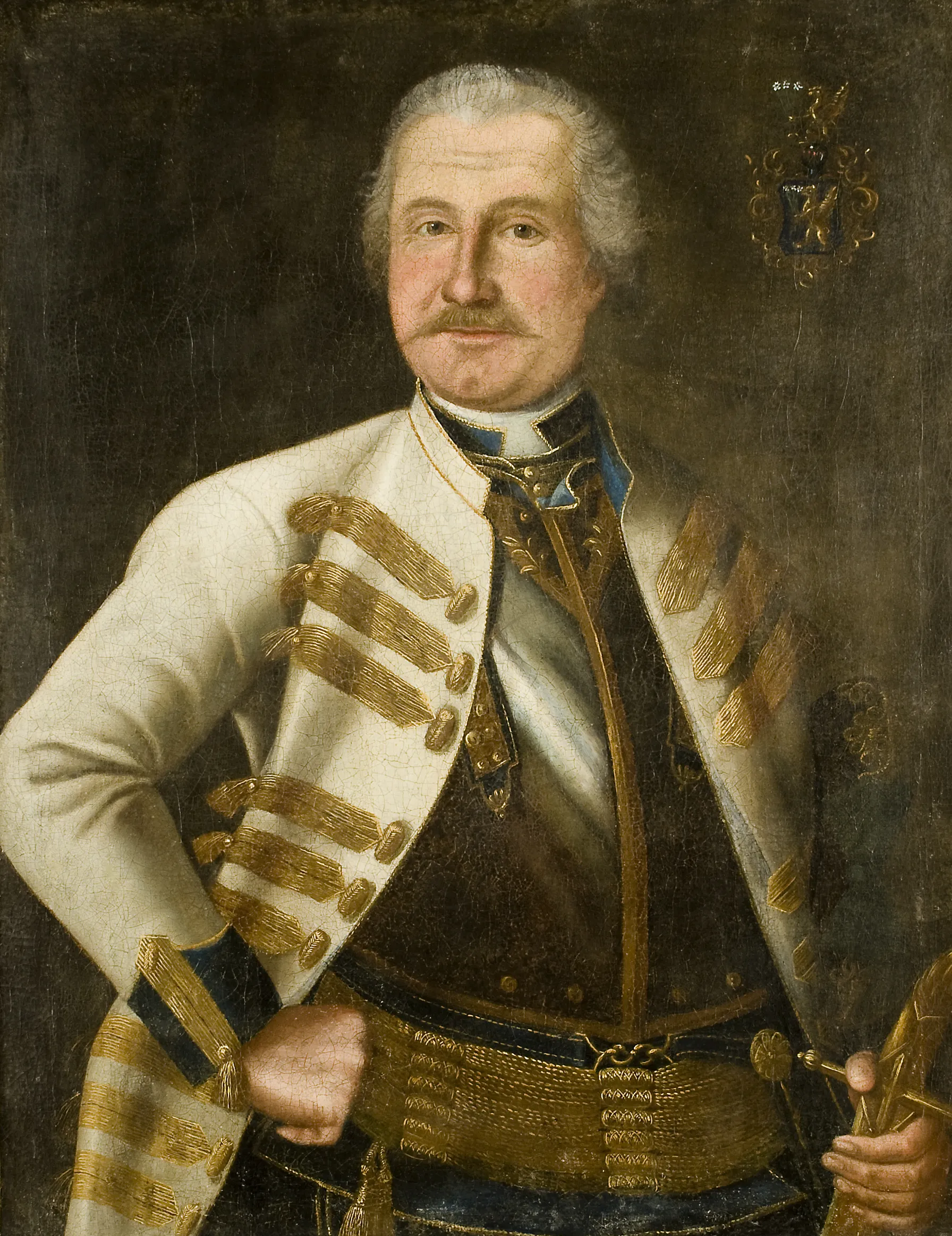
- Portrait of Johann II. Kiss de Kissáros by Kálmán Tichy. Exhibited at the Lutheran Central Museum.
- Born: c. 1710
- Died: October 14, 1758; Hochkirch
- Spouse: Maria Tuczentaller de Csataj
- Children: József Kiss; Gabriel Kiss
- Military career
- Allegiance: Habsburg Monarchy
- Branch: Imperial Army
- Service years: 1733–1758
- Rank: Lieutenant Colonel
- Unit: Infanterieregiment No. 34
- Conflicts: War of Austrian Succession; Seven Years' War; Battle of Hochkirch

Johann Kiss de Kissáros (Hungarian: kissárosi Kiss János; c. 1710 – October 14, 1758) was a Hungarian nobleman and military officer who served in the Imperial Army during the 18th century. He held the rank of lieutenant colonel (Oberstleutnant) and participated in several major European conflicts, including the Austrian Succession War and the Seven Years’ War. He was fatally wounded while leading an assault on a fortified position during the Battle of Hochkirch on October 14, 1758. Despite heavy resistance from Prussian forces, his regiment successfully captured the objective, but he succumbed to his injuries on the battlefield.

== Early life and family ==
Johann Kiss de Kissáros was born around 1710, although historical sources provide conflicting information regarding his place of birth. Some records suggest he was born in Jobbágyi, Nógrád County, while others indicate he was born in Kajáta, near Eperjes (present-day Kojatice and Prešov in Slovakia, respectively). His family, the Kiss de Kissáros lineage, was a noble house in the Kingdom of Hungary that received recognition in 1691 from Leopold I, King of Hungary in Turóc County.

Johann married Maria Tuczentaller, a noblewoman from Eperjes, with whom he had six children. Among them was József Kiss (1748–1813) and Gábor Kiss, who later became prominent engineers and military officers. The couple raised their family primarily in Eperjes, although József was born in Buda (modern-day Budapest).

== Military career ==
Johann Kiss de Kissáros pursued a career in the Imperial Habsburg Army, becoming the first known member of his family to gain notable recognition for his military service. He served in the Infanterieregiment No. 34, originally founded as Vettes-Infanterieregiment by Ladislaus von Kökényesdi de Vettes in 1733. This regiment participated in several European campaigns, including the War of the Polish Succession (1733–1735) and operations in Italy.

During the Austrian Succession War (1740–1748), Johann took part in major battles, including the Battle of Hohenfriedberg (1745) and the Battle of Soor (1745), where his regiment fought against the forces of King Frederick II of Prussia. By 1743, he had attained the rank of captain (Hauptmann). By 1751, he had risen to the rank of major (Obristwachtmeister), and by 1758, he had attained the rank of lieutenant colonel (Oberstleutnant).

=== Role in the Seven Years’ War ===
When the Seven Years’ War (1756–1763) broke out, Johann continued to serve in the Habsburg Army. In 1757, he fought in the defense of Prague against Prussian forces and following the successful Austrian counteroffensive, Johann and his regiment were deployed to Schweidnitz (modern-day Świdnica, Poland), a strategic fortress town in Silesia. In the Siege of Schweidnitz (October 1757), he played a key role in the Austrian siege operations against the fortified Prussian garrison.

As part of a coordinated offensive led by Austrian General Ferenc Nádasdy, his regiment was assigned to breach a defensive redoubt protecting the fortress perimeter. Under intense Prussian musket and artillery fire, Kiss de Kissáros led his men in a direct frontal assault against the entrenched enemy forces. Despite suffering heavy casualties, his unit successfully overran the defensive positions, engaging the Prussian defenders in hand-to-hand combat with bayonets and sabers, contributing to the overall capitulation of the fortress. This victory was crucial in regaining control of Silesia, a region that had been contested since the First Silesian War (1740–1742).

==== Capture and exchange ====
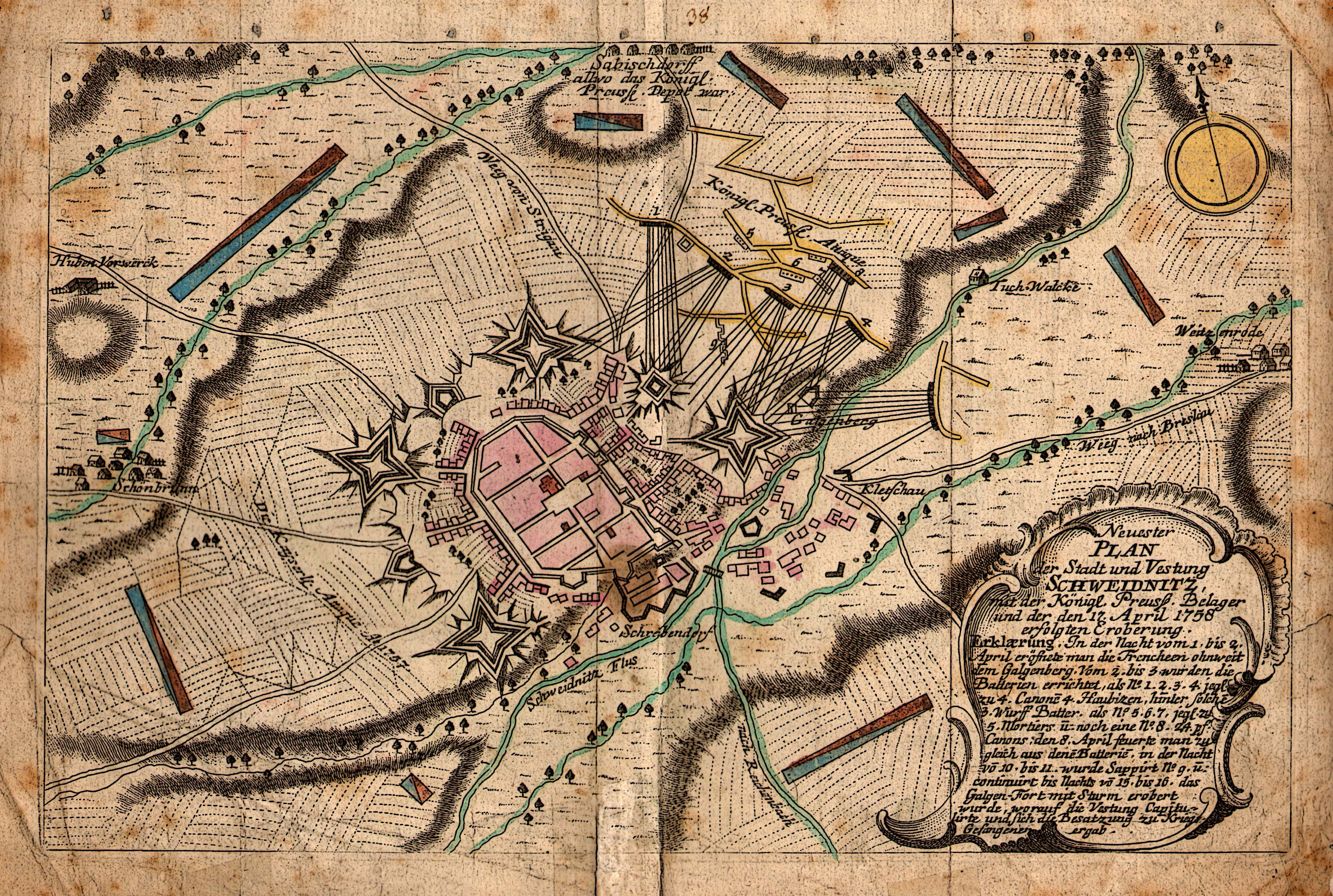
Map of the Siege of Schweidnitz in 1758

In early 1758, Frederick II launched a counteroffensive to retake Schweidnitz, resulting in the Prussian siege of the fortress. Kiss de Kissáros played a role in organizing the city’s defenses, but on April 16, 1758, the Austrian garrison was forced to surrender. He was taken prisoner along with several high-ranking Austrian officers. However, due to his distinguished service, he was quickly exchanged for a Prussian officer and rejoined the Austrian army, while all other prisoners of war remained in captivity until the end of the war in 1763.

==== Battle of Hochkirch and death ====
Following his release, Kiss de Kissáros was assigned to Leopold Joseph von Daun’s main army. In October 1758, he took part in the Austrian surprise attack on the Prussian forces at Hochkirch, a battle that became one of Austria’s most significant victories of the war.

In preparation for the engagement, his regiment participated in a forced march, covering 76 kilometers in just 17 hours. According to regimental records, the march was executed in full order and discipline, reflecting the unit’s exceptional endurance and combat readiness.

On October 14, 1758, Kiss de Kissáros led his battalion in an assault on a fortified Prussian position near the town’s cemetery. Initially, the Austrians forced the Prussians to retreat, but enemy reinforcements regrouped and counterattacked, turning the cemetery and nearby buildings into a stronghold. Several Austrian units attempted to take the position but were repelled by concentrated fire from behind the cemetery’s high stone walls.

At a critical moment in the battle, Kiss de Kissáros and his unit were ordered to break the deadlock. Leading his battalion from the front, he stormed the cemetery walls, engaging in hand-to-hand combat. The Prussian commander was killed, and after fierce fighting, the Austrians secured the position. However, Kiss de Kissáros was mortally wounded during the assault, falling with his sword in hand. His adjutant András Csáktornyay, three other officers, and over 50 soldiers also perished. Nearly every surviving member of his battalion was wounded. Following his death, Ignaz Sigismund Rosin de Doresil assumed command of the unit.

The capture of the cemetery proved decisive, preventing the Austrians from being driven back and contributing directly to Daun’s victory over Frederick II. In recognition of the regiment’s decisive role in securing the Austrian victory, Ignaz Sigismund Rosin de Doresil, the highest-ranking surviving officer, was awarded the Military Order of Maria Theresa in 1760, which conferred upon him the hereditary title of Freiherr (Baron).

Kiss de Kissáros’ leadership and sacrifice were recognized in Austrian military reports. His military prestige likely contributed to his sons being granted state-financed scholarships to the Theresian Military Academy and later to study in the Netherlands and the United Kingdom.

== Legacy ==
After his death, his sons, József and Gábor, were granted state-financed education at the Theresian Military Academy in Wiener Neustadt due to their father’s military service and sacrifice. József and Gábor went on to become notable military engineers, receiving an imperial scholarship from Co-Emperor Joseph II to study hydraulic engineering in the Netherlands and Great Britain.

Johann Kiss de Kissáros played an active role in the Habsburg military campaigns of the 18th century, participating in several key battles. His service is documented in Hungarian and Austro-Hungarian military history.
