= Mavro Sachs =

Croatian physician

- Mavro Sachs around 1848, in the Austrian Empire army uniform
- Born: Moritz Sachs; 1817; Jánosháza, Austrian Empire, (now Hungary)
- Died: 5 May 1888 (aged 71); Rijeka, Austro-Hungarian Empire, (now Croatia)
- Education: Medical University of Vienna
- Occupations: Physician, lecturer
- Spouse: Graziella (née Fritz) Sachs
- Children: Hinko Sachs pl. Grički (son); Viktorija and Matilda (daughters)

Mavro Sachs (born Moritz Sachs; 1817 – 5 May 1888) was medical doctor from Austria-Hungary, the first lecturer of the University of Zagreb, founder of the forensic medicine in what is now Croatia and the first Jew who officially became citizen of Zagreb.

== Life and education ==
Sachs was born in Jánosháza to a notable Czech Jewish family of Emanuel Sachs. He had a brother, Eduard. In 1828, Sachs and his family moved to Zagreb where he was educated. He attended the Medical University of Vienna from which he successfully graduated on 25 April 1846. He was the first Croatian Jew who has completed the university studies and who has been awarded with doctoral degree. Sachs was married to Graziella (née Fritz) Sachs, with whom he had a son and two daughters; Hinko, Viktorija and Matilda. At the time he was a close friend with the most prominent Croatians such as, Count Josip Jelačić and Roman Catholic bishop Josip Juraj Strossmayer.

== Career and later life ==
When he returned to Zagreb from Vienna, Sachs worked as the city and county physician. In 1848, Sachs joined and served as the physician in Austrian Empire army under Count Josip Jelačić. In 1849, he was the first to teach the forensic medicine at the Zagreb "Royal Academy of Science" and "Faculty of Social Sciences". From 1868, Sachs taught in the status of private docent at the "Faculty of Law" (former "Royal Academy of Science") of University of Zagreb. Sachs also taught hygiene at the "Academy Dr. Moric Weiss". As a member of the Zagreb Medical Society (founded in 1845) he attended the first physicians assembly of Kingdom of Croatia and Slavonia held in Zagreb on 14 June 1850. At that assembly it was requested the establishment of a medical college and midwifery school with teaching in Croatian. Sachs did not limit himself only to theoretical lectures, he also performed the forensic chemical tests and autopsy on cadavers of individual patients who died in the Zagreb "Hospital of merciful brothers" (now "Sveti Duh"). When in the 1862, the Croatian-Slavonian Royal Council formed a committee to establish the University of Zagreb, Sachs, along with physicians Aleks Vancoš and Josip Mlinarić was a member of the audit committee responsible for the preparation of medical school. Sachs also taught at the Zagreb "Faculty of Pharmacy and Biochemistry" of University of Zagreb from 1887. Until his death, Sachs taught "Judicial health care and medical legislation" at the "Faculty of Law" of University of Zagreb. For his merit, Sachs was knighted by Franz Joseph I of Austria. From 1855 to 1860, Sachs was the president of the Jewish community in Zagreb. Under his leadership, parcel for the construction of Zagreb Synagogue was bought. In 1859 the Zagreb Jewish society "Hevra kadiša", founded by Sachs, enacted the statute to help sick parishioners, widows and orphans. Sachs was also a member of the "Društvo čovječnosti" Zagreb (Humanity society), the benefactor society which aided poor and needy.

== Death ==
Sachs died in Rijeka on May 5, 1888 while visiting his son Hinko Sachs pl. Grički, who was the president of the Jewish community in Rijeka.

== Bibliography ==
- Snješka Knežević, Aleksander Laslo (2011). Židovski Zagreb. Zagreb: AGM, Židovska općina Zagreb. ISBN 978-953-174-393-8.
- Schwarz, Gavro (1939). Povijest Zagrebačke židovske općine od osnutka do 50-tih godina 19. vijeka. Zagreb: Gaj.
- Kolar Dimitrijević, Mira (1998). Društvo čovječnosti 1846 - 1946. Zagreb: Židovska općina Zagreb, Kulturno društvo "Miroslav Šalom Freiberger". ISBN 953-97067-3-4.
