= Nestlé Bear Brand =

Powdered milk brand

Bear Brand
- Product type: Milk
- Current owner: Nestlé
- Produced by: Nestlé Philippines
- Country: Philippines
- Introduced: 1892; 134 years ago
- Related brands: Bärenmarke (Switzerland, under license)
- Markets: Southeast Asia
- Previous owners: Bernese Alps Milk Company; F.E. Zuellig, Inc. (until 1976)
- Website: bearbrand.com.ph
- Brand names Bear Brand Choco, Bear Brand Real Strawberry, Bear Brand Adult Plus, Bear Brand Busog Lusog, Bear Brand Gold

Bear Brand is a drink and powdered milk brand currently owned by Nestlé. The brand is available in most areas of Southeast Asia, East Asia, and Eastern Africa, as well as in Asian stores in the United States and Canada. It was marketed under the brand name "Marca Orso", which is Italian for "Bear Brand". The brand's Indonesian name is "Susu Cap Beruang".

In 2014, a consumer research firm ranked Bear Brand milk as No. 6 among the top 50 "most popular fast-moving consumer goods" in the Philippines.

== Variants ==
=== Sterilized milk ===
==== Philippines ====
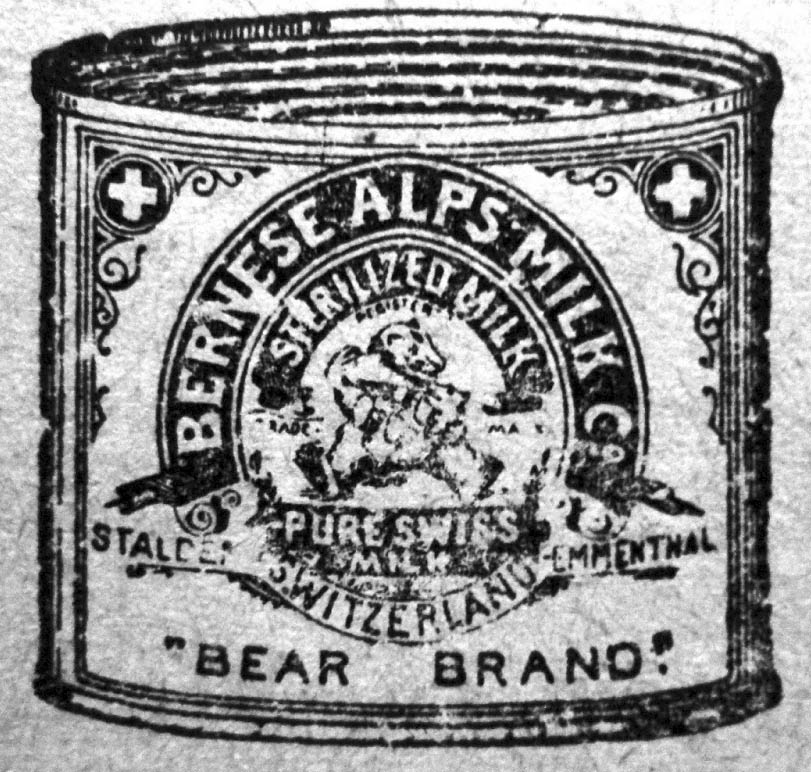
Early 1906 ad showing a Bear Brand can

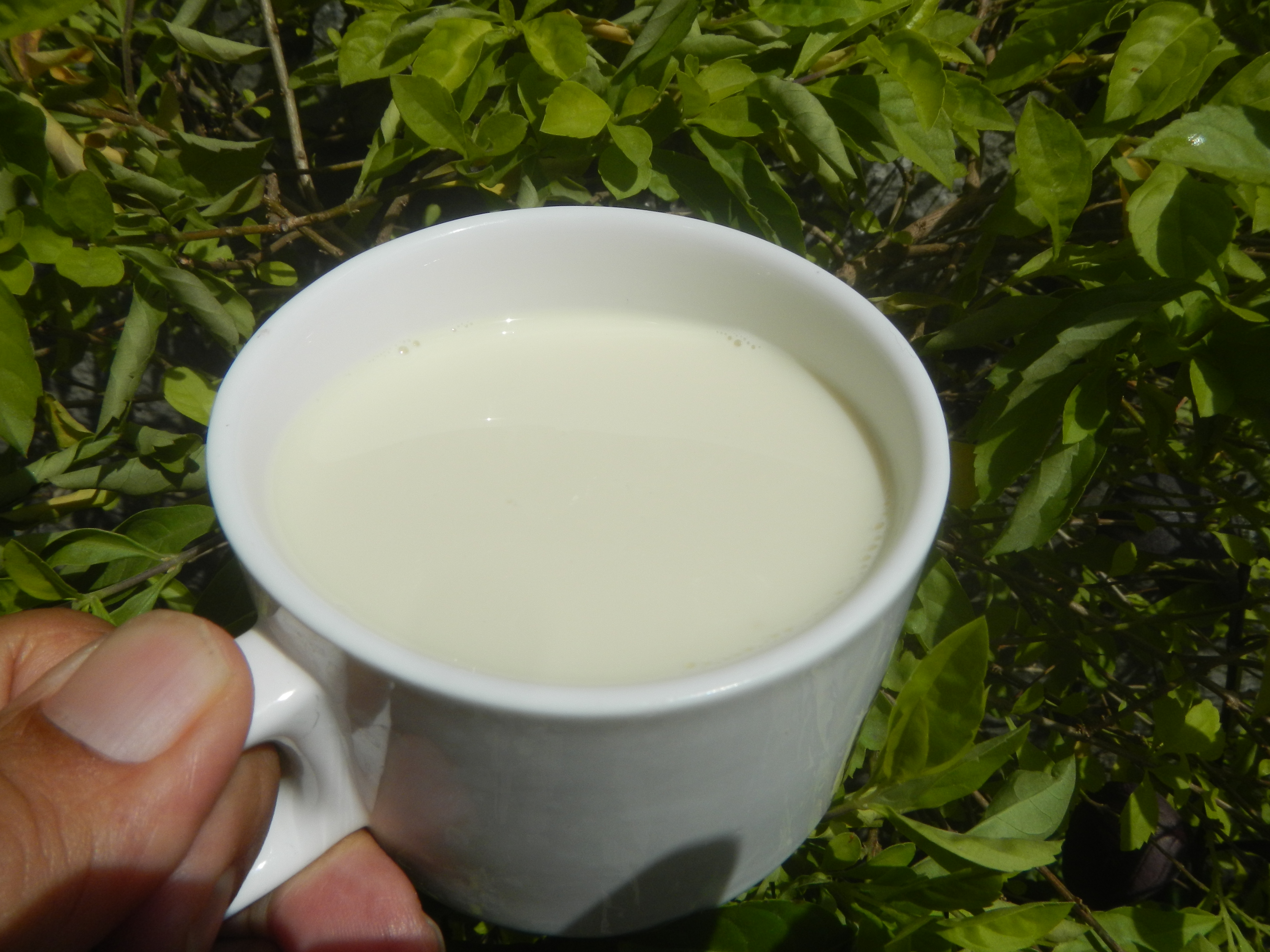
Cup of Bear Brand milk

- Bear Brand Sterilized tin can – 140 ml
- Bear Brand Sterilized tin can – 155 ml (1906–2016)
- Bear Brand Sterilized Tetra Pak – 200 ml
- Bear Brand Sterilized Tetra Pak – 1 L

==== Indonesia ====
- Bear Brand Susu Steril slim tube – 189 ml

==== Thailand, Vietnam, Myanmar, Laos and Cambodia ====
- Bear Brand Sterilized tin can – 140 ml
- Bear Brand Sterilized Low-Fat tin can – 140 ml
- Bear Brand Sterilized 0% Fat tin can – 140 ml

== Milestones ==
Year	Introductions and reception
1898	Bear Brand (also known as Bärenmarke in Switzerland) was introduced.
1906	Bear Brand Sterilized first appeared as Bear Brand Swiss Milk or Marca Oso.
1930s	It was introduced in Indonesia.
1976	The Bear Brand Powdered Milk was launched.
1980	It was introduced in Thailand.
1988	Bear Brand changed its logo to a cartoonish bear.
1998	Bear Brand Fit 'n Fresh was introduced but was discontinued in the first month of 2000.
2001	Bear Brand Jr. (for 1 to 3 years old), a baby milk supplement brand, was introduced. It was formerly named 'Bear Brand 1+'.
2002	Bear Brand Sterilized was now sold in Tetra Pak.
2006	Bear Brand Gold was introduced. It is available in flavours: White Malt, White Tea, Goji Berry and White Kidney Beans. It is fortified with Vitamin A, B1, B2, B6, B12, C, D, and E. This sterilized low-fat milk is high in calcium, with its malt extract flavour available in Thailand, Cambodia, Myanmar, and Indonesia.
2006	Bear Brand Choco was introduced. The chocolate flavoured powdered milk is also available in the form of Bear Brand Adult Plus.
2008	The Bear Brand Busog Lusog cereal drink was introduced. It is one of the most popular cereal drinks in the Philippines This rendition of the Bear Brand Milk followed shortly after the increased popularity of the Energen cereal drink in the market. This may have been one of Nestle's reactions to Sigmavit.
2009	The bear cub in the Bear Brand logo was removed due to the Bear Brand Sweetened Creamer being misunderstood as a breast milk substitute for toddlers under 36 months of age in Laos.
2010	The Bear Brand sterilized milk was introduced with Ginseng and Ginkgo Biloba flavors.
2011	Bear Brand Adult Plus was introduced. The drink is targeted for working adults.
2014	Bear Brand powdered drink mix was reformulated circa 2014, which included the addition of 100% of the recommended daily intake of vitamin C per serving. Iron and Zinc levels were also increased.
2016	In Cambodia and Myanmar, Bear Brand Nutritious Cereal Drink was introduced.
2017	Bear Brand Powdered Milk Drink upgraded its formula and it released in the Philippines and was named Bear Brand Fortified. The iron content was tripled and still has 100% Vitamin C and has high levels of zinc.
2017	Myanmar introduced the Nestle Bear Brand Gold.
2017	Bear Brand Yogu, a form of yoghurt milk drink version of Bear Brand, was introduced.
2017	Bear Brand Real Strawberry, the strawberry flavour of Bear Brand Powdered Milk, was introduced. This powdered milk flavour of Bear Brand is the only one that has strawberry bits.
2019	Bear Brand Adult Plus Milk Drink with Coffee, the coffee flavour of Bear Brand Adult Plus was introduced.
2019	Bear Brand Fortified Powdered Milk Drink updated its formula with even more Zinc compared to the 2017 formulation, while having its previous improvements.
2020	Bear Brand Fortified Powdered Milk Drink introduced its ready-to-drink Tetra Pak milk drink.
2021	Both Bear Brand Real Strawberry Powdered Milk Drink and Bear Brand Yogu removed from the market on the same year.
2021	Bear Brand Powdered Milk Drink reformulated, having 100% Vitamin D in their formula.

== International branding ==
In Thailand, the Bear Brand Sterilized is branded by other variants. In Cambodia, Bear Brand was introduced in July 2015, while in Myanmar, Bear Brand was introduced in October 2016. Bear Brand's Indonesian package is in slim tube 189 mL content. In Switzerland, the brand is instead named Bärenmarke in German origin of name.

== Logos ==
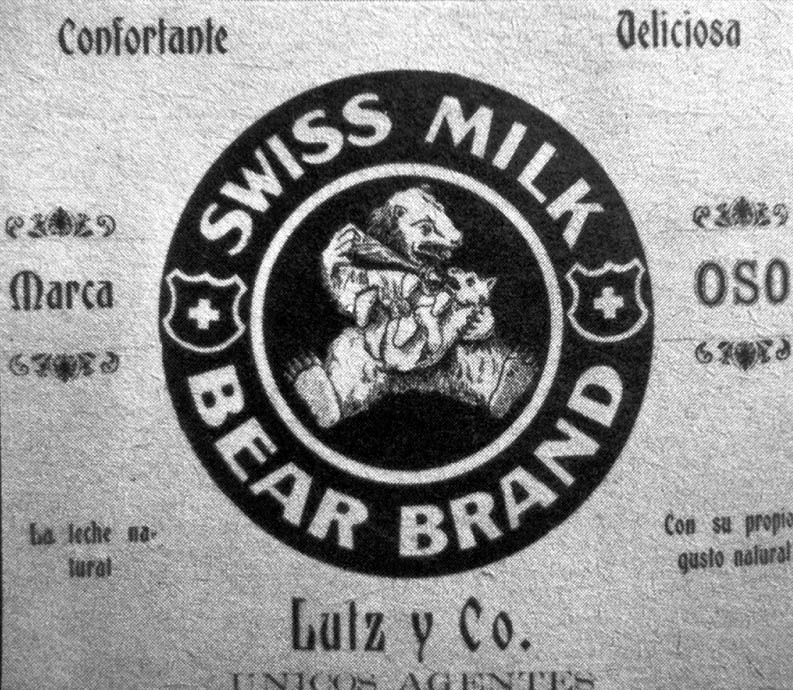
1906 ad depicting a bear feeding a baby bear

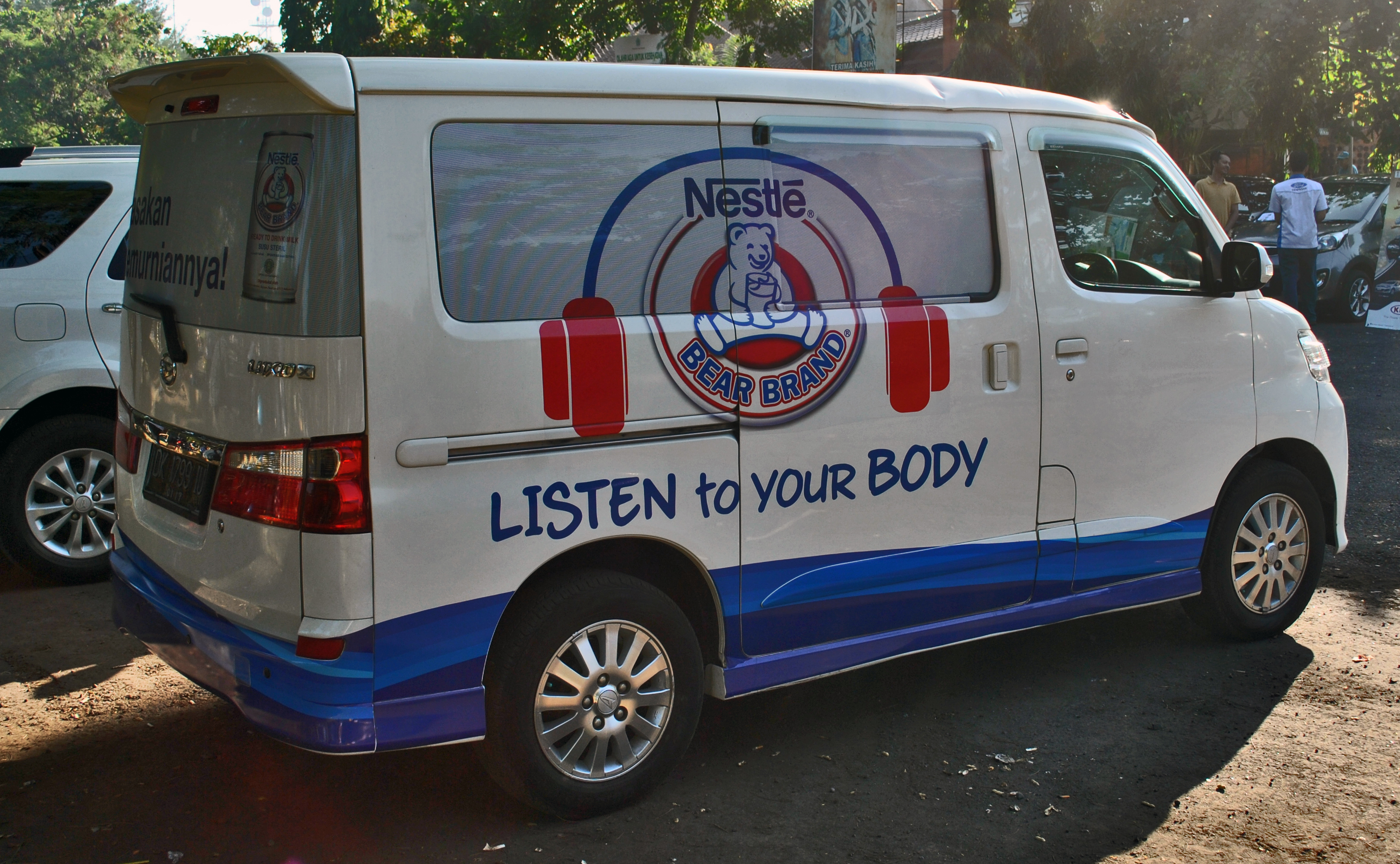
Daihatsu Luxio used as a commercials van to advertise the Bear Brand

On its introduction in 1906, the Bear Brand logo depicted a bear bottle-feeding a baby bear. The bottle was removed on its logo in 1967.

In 1976, the launch of the Bear Brand Powdered Milk included the bear with a cub and the wordmark. In 1992, the bears refreshed with a cartoonish look, and in 1996, the shield appeared one its logo, but in 2002 the shape was changed with the current shield logo form.

In 2004, the logo in most of the countries of Southeast Asia, used the circle logo variant. In 2013, the Bear Brand logo wordmark typeface was changed from Franklin Gothic to Arial for the shield logo. While in their circle logo, since 2016 (for Cambodia, Laos, and Myanmar), uses Helvetica typeface.

== Commercials, advertisements and slogans ==
In the Philippines, they use the slogan "Tibay Araw-Araw" starting from 2012. Their present "Laki Sa Gatas" nutrition education advocacy program was first launched in 2006.

In 2015, Bear Brand's Alamat ng Matibay book was launched, which introduced the character Mina, and her friend Sonson.

== See also ==
- List of Nestlé brands
