= Kis (surname) =

Kis, Kış or Kiš, is a surname. Like Kiss (surname), it is often derived from the Hungarian word kis, meaning "small". Notable persons with this surname include:

- Andriy Kis (born 1982), Ukrainian luger and Olympics competitor
- Attila Kálnoki Kis (born 1965), Hungarian modern pentathlete and Olympics competitor
- Cássia Kis (born 1958), Brazilian actress
- Danilo Kiš (1935–1989), Serbian writer and translator
- Gábor Gellért Kis (1946–2013) Hungarian journalist, professor, and politician
- Gábor Kis (born 1982), Hungarian water polo player and Olympic medalist
- Gergő Kis (born 1988), Hungarian freestyle swimmer and Olympics competitor
- Ivana Kiš (born 1979), Croatian composer
- János Kis (born 1943), Hungarian philosopher, political scientist, and politician
- János Sarusi Kis (born 1960), Hungarian sprint canoeist and Olympics competitor
- Kalman Kiš (1914–date of death unknown), Yugoslavian wrestler and Olympics competitor
- Kevin Kis (born 1990), Belgian footballer
- Miklós Tótfalusi Kis (1650–1702) Hungarian letter cutter, typeface designer, typographer, and printer
- Pavle Kiš (1940–2018) Serbian footballer
- Rita Kuti Kis (born 1978) Hungarian tennis player
- Saša Kiš (born 1989) Serbian footballer
- Tevfik Kış (1934–2019), Turkish wrestler and Olympic medalist
- Tomislav Kiš (born 1994) Croatian footballer
- Yuri Kis (born 1962), Russian breaststroke swimmer and instructor
