= Sándor Kiss =

Sándor Kiss may refer to:

- Sándor Kiss (footballer) (born 1956), Hungarian footballer
- Sándor Kiss (gymnast) (1941–2012), Hungarian Olympic gymnast
- Sándor Kiss (wrestler) (born 1962), Hungarian wrestler

== See also ==
- Kiss (surname)
