= Energen (cereal drink) =

Cereal brand from Indonesia

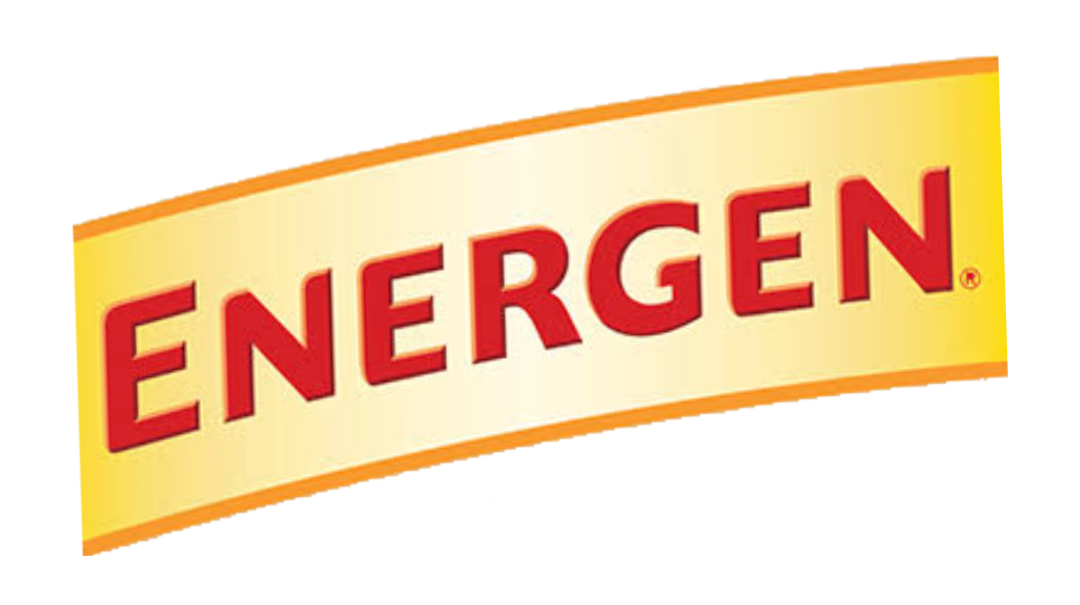
- Product type: Cereal drink
- Current owner: PT Mayora Indah Tbk. (as PT Torabika Eka Semesta)
- Country: Indonesia
- Introduced: 1992; 34 years ago
- Markets: Indonesia; Philippines
- Ambassador: Kathryn Bernardo
- Tagline: Minum Makanan Bergizi (lit. 'Drink nutritious food')

Energen is a cereal drink brand owned by PT Mayora Indah and the Philippines-based Vouno Trade Marketing Services Inc. This brand was fortified with SIGMAvit.

== History ==
=== Indonesia ===
In 1992, Energen was introduced by PT Mayora Indah Tbk. with the flavors Vanilla, Chocolate, Corn, Green Beans and Ginger.

=== Philippines ===
In 2002, Energen was introduced by Tridharma Marketing Corporation (now Ecossential Foods Corporation) with the flavors Vanilla and Chocolate. It was followed by Bear Brand Busog Lusog in May 2008, which is the first wholly-Filipino made cereal drink. In 2010, Monggo flavor was introduced, but in 2013 it was discontinued, but remains available in Indonesia. In 2013, Ginger flavor was introduced, but it was discontinued in 2016 and remains available in Indonesia. In 2017, Sweet Corn flavor was introduced and discontinued in 2018.

== Variants ==
Energen is enriched with SIGMAVit (a proprietary nutrient infused powder) with milk, malt, cereal and oats. In Indonesia, it was manufactured as oat milk (like Quaker Oats). In the Philippines, a variant with a mixture of oat drink and real fruit called Energen Go-Fruit in 2013 was manufactured and marketed. It was silently discontinued in 2015.
