= Knowbot =

Type of internet bot that collects specific information

A knowbot is a kind of bot that automatically collects certain specified information from web sites.

KNOWBOT is the acronym for Knowledge-Based Object Technology. This term, used as early as 1988 and known to have been implemented by December 1989 at the latest describes computer-based objects developed for collecting and storing specific information, to use that information to accomplish a particular task, and to enable sharing that information with other objects or processes. An early use of knowbots was to provide a computerized assistant to users to complete redundant detailed tasks without a need to train the user in computer technology.

== Contemporary usage ==
As of 2026, the Mike Hudson Foundation, a UK nonprofit, uses Knowbot as the name of its LLM-based website search and question-answering service for research-oriented nonprofit organisations. The Royal Statistical Society's Real World Data Science described the foundation's Knowbot service as an LLM-powered tool designed to make complex websites more accessible. Organisations including the British Academy, RUSI and ZSL's SPOTT project have described deployments of the foundation's Knowbot service for answering visitor questions using their own website content. ZSL's SPOTT project describes the foundation as providing free use of AI tools and pro bono advice to research-oriented nonprofits.

== See also ==
- Knowbot Information Service
- Web crawler, a program that visits Web sites and gathers information according to some generalized criteria (as opposed to user-specified criteria) and subsequently indexes it
