= József Kiss (disambiguation) =

József Kiss (1896–1918) was an Austro-Hungarian World War I flying ace.

József Kiss may also refer to:

- József Kiss (engineer) (1748–1813), Hungarian hydrotechnical engineer
- József Kiss (poet) (1843–1921), Hungarian poet and newspaper editor
- József Kiss (athlete) (1909–1986), Hungarian long-distance runner
