= Gabriel Kiss =

- Kiss Gábor
- Born: 21 November 1752; Prešov, Kingdom of Hungary (now Slovakia)
- Died: 7 April 1800 (aged 47); Vienna, Habsburg Monarchy (now Austria)
- Education: Theresian Military Academy
- Occupations: Engineer, Military Officer
- Known for: Planning and developing the Great Bačka Canal
- Notable work: Great Bačka Canal, Karlovac Canal (proposed)
- Spouse: Baroness Joanna von der Ketten
- Children: Franz Kiss, Karl Kiss
- Parent(s): Johann Kiss, Maria Tuczentaller

Gabriel Kiss de Kissáros (Hungarian: kissárosi Kiss Gábor; 21 November 1752 – 7 April 1800) was a Hungarian engineer and military officer. He is best known for his role in the conception and development of the Great Bačka Canal, a major infrastructure project that connected the Danube and Tisza rivers.

== Early life and family ==
Gabriel was born on 21 November 1752 in Prešov as the fifth child of Johann Kiss, a lieutenant colonel who died in the Battle of Hochkirch, and Maria Tuczentaller noblewoman. He had two brothers, József (born 19 March 1748) and István (born 22 August 1751), as well as three other siblings who died in infancy.

Gabriel married Baroness Joanna von der Ketten, a member of the von der Ketten family, which originally hailed from the Netherlands but had resided for generations in Cologne, Germany. They had two sons, Franz (8 December 1791 in Vienna) and Karl (1799 in Buda), as well as two other children who died in infancy.

== Education and career ==
Following their father's death in battle in 1758, Gabriel and József were entitled to state-financed education in Wiener Neustadt, where they both enrolled at the Theresian Military Academy.

Kiss excelled in his studies, which led to his acceptance into the Engineers Corps (Ingenieurkorps), a specialized military branch responsible for fortifications, infrastructure, and engineering projects. He quickly gained recognition for his contribution to fortification projects and artillery improvements. Beyond his military duties, he pursued civil engineering and economic development, working on canal planning, and land management. He also advocated for grain storage facilities in Hungary to stabilize food supplies, ensuring surplus grain could be sold at lower prices during shortages.

=== Franzenskanal (Great Bačka Canal) ===
During the Austro-Turkish War (1788–1791), Gabriel visited his brother József, who was serving as the lead engineer for Bácska (Dirigirender Hofkammer—Ingenieur) to assist in the preliminary work for the construction of what later became known as the Franzenskanal (Great Bačka Canal). This included surveying the terrain, planning the waterway, and securing the necessary approvals before construction could begin.

Convinced of the project’s feasibility, Gabriel and József drafted technical plans and presented them to imperial authorities. The proposal received official approval, and in 1793, the brothers secured a 25-year exclusive concession to construct and operate the Franzenskanal, named in honor of Emperor Francis II.

To fund the project, the Kiss brothers established a joint-stock company called The Privileged Hungarian Shipping Society (Hungarian: Ferencz csatornai kir. Szabadalmazott Hajózási Társaság) modeled after similar British canal enterprises. Investors were offered dividends from toll revenues, and the enterprise received imperial patronage. Under the supervision of József Kiss, the construction work began in 1793.

=== Karlovac Canal ===
Encouraged by the early progress of the Franzenskanal, the Kiss brothers developed plans for an even more ambitious project – the Karlovac Canal. This proposed project aimed to create a navigable waterway linking the Danube river with the Drava, Sava, and Kupa rivers, ultimately providing Hungary with direct access to maritime trade through the Adriatic Sea.

The estimated cost of the project was 2 million forints, and it attracted significant financial interest, including a bank from Genoa offering an extensive loan for a 4% annual interest rate. The Privileged Hungarian Shipping Society, chaired by József Kiss, was prepared to oversee the project.

=== French Revolutionary Wars and difficulties ===
The outbreak of the French Revolutionary Wars led to Gabriel being recalled to military service, and caused a workforce shortage on the construction site of the Franzenskanal. In the following years, the project encountered financial and logistical difficulties. In 1796, an anonymous tip about the construction work being behind schedule and over budget led to József Kiss being expelled from the association. He was replaced by Stanislav Hepe, who oversaw the project from 1797 to 1801.

Gabriel died on 7 April 1800 in Vienna, 2 years before the completion of the Franzenskanal. The second canal connecting the Danube with the Adriatic Sea was never constructed. Nevertheless, his efforts laid the foundation for a significant infrastructure project in Hungary during the late 18th century, improving trade, commerce, and regional economic development.

== Legacy ==
Gabriel Kiss contributed to Hungary’s waterway infrastructure through his role in the development of the Franzenskanal, which connected the Danube and Tisza rivers and remained in use for over a century. The canal stands as an ambitious infrastructure project of its era.
