= Jogi Hendra Atmadja =

Indonesian businessman

- Born: 1946 (age 79–80); Jakarta, Indonesia
- Occupation: Chairman of Mayora Indah

Jogi Hendra Atmadja (born 1946) is an Indonesian billionaire businessman. He is the chairman of Mayora Indah, one of Indonesia's largest food companies. He is ranked as the 10th-richest person in Indonesia by Forbes magazine, with a net worth of US$3.6 billion as of April 2023.

== Early life and education ==
Atmadja was born in Indonesia. He graduated with a degree in economics from the University of Indonesia.

== Career ==
Atmadja started his career as a banker at Bank Central Asia. In 1977, he founded the Mayora Group with his brothers and sisters. Mayora Group produces and sells various food and beverage products, such as coffee, cereal, candy, biscuits, wafers, chocolate, and instant noodles. Mayora Group has more than 50 brands, including Kopiko, Danisa, Beng-Beng, Energen, and Torabika. Mayora Group operates 25 factories in Indonesia and overseas, and exports its products to more than 100 countries. In 2020, Mayora Group reported revenues of Rp 29.5 trillion (US$2 billion) and a net income of Rp 2.4 trillion (US$167 million).

== Personal life ==
Atmadja is married and has four children,. He lives in Jakarta, Indonesia. He is known for his philanthropic activities, especially in the fields of education and health.
