= László Kiss (judge) =

Hungarian judge (1951–2026)

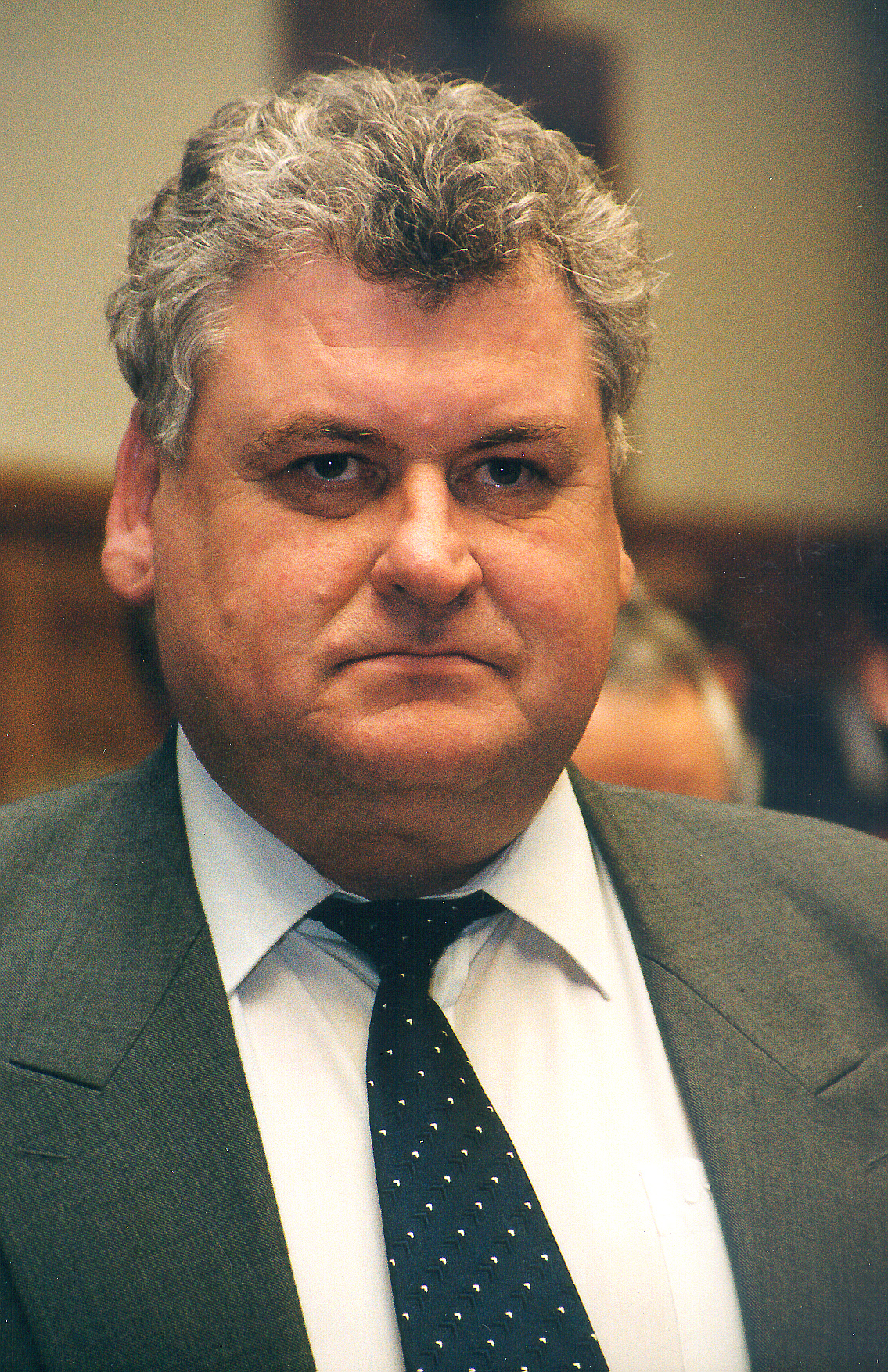
- Kiss in 2003

Justice of the Constitutional Court of Hungary
- In office 10 March 1998 – 10 March 2016

Personal details
- Born: 10 February 1951 Jánosháza, Hungary
- Died: 10 March 2026 (aged 75)
- Education: University of Pécs
- Occupation: Judge

László Kiss (10 February 1951 – 10 March 2026) was a Hungarian judge. He served on the Constitutional Court from 1998 to 2016.

Kiss died on 10 March 2026, at the age of 75.
