= György Kiss =

György Kiss is the name of

- György Kiss (footballer) (born 1975), Hungarian football defender
- György Kiss (runner) (born 1936), Hungarian middle- and long-distance runner
- György Kiss (sculptor) (1852–1919), Hungarian sculptor
