= Pavle Kiš =

Serbian footballer

Personal information
- Full name: Pavle Kiš
- Date of birth: 8 July 1940
- Place of birth: Kingdom of Yugoslavia
- Date of death: 27 November 2018 (aged 78)
- Place of death: Serbia
- Position: Forward

Senior career*
Years	Team	Apps	(Gls)
1959–1963	Partizan	9	(0)
1963–1964	Wiener AC		
1964–1965	Grazer AK		
1965–1966	Hamborn 07		
1966–1968	Hertha BSC	21	(1)
1968–1969	PSV	5	(1)
1969–1970	Bayer Leverkusen		
1973–1974	Sportfreunde Siegen		
1976–1977	Maribor	3	(0)
- * Club domestic league appearances and goals

Pavle Kiš (Serbian Cyrillic: Павле Киш; 8 July 1940 – 28 November 2018) was a Serbian footballer.

== Career ==
Kiš joined the Partizan youth set-up in December 1955 and went on to play 50 games for them, scoring 6 goals. He later played 5 Eredivisie matches for PSV.

== Personal life ==
His daughter Lea is a well-known Serbian TV presenter, as well as Lea's daughter Sara-Mia Jokić.

=== Death ===
Kiš died in 2018, aged 78.
