= Knowbot Information Service =

The Knowbot Information Service (KIS), also known as netaddress, is an Internet user search engine that debuted in December 1989. Although it searches users, not content, it could be argued to be the first search engine on the Internet as it queried more than a single network for information. It provided a uniform user interface to a variety of remote directory services such as whois, finger, X.500, and MCI Mail. By submitting a single query to KIS, a user can search a set of remote white pages services and see the results of the search in a uniform format. There are several interfaces to the KIS service including e-mail and telnet. Another KIS interface imitates the Berkeley whois command.

KIS consists of two distinct types of modules that interact with each other (typically across a network) to provide the service. One module is a user agent module that runs on the KIS mail host machine. The second module is a remote server module (possibly on a different machine) that interrogates various database services across the network and provides the results to the user agent module in a uniform fashion. Interactions between the two modules can be via messages between knowbots or by actual movement of knowbots.
