= Jánosháza =

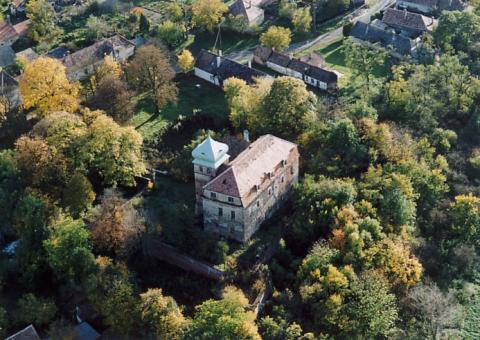

- Flag Coat of arms

- Location of Jánosháza in Hungary
- Coordinates: 47.12219°N 17.16408°E
- Country: Hungary
- Region: Western Transdanubia
- County: Vas
- Subregion: Celldömölki
- Rank: Town

Area
  - Total: 23.41 km^{2} (9.04 sq mi)

Population (1 January 2008)
  - Total: 2,572
  - Density: 109.9/km^{2} (284.6/sq mi)
- Time zone: UTC+1 (CET)
  - Summer (DST): UTC+2 (CEST)
- Postal code: 9545
- Area code: +36 95
- KSH code: 11679
- Website: www.janoshaza.hu

Jánosháza is a town in Vas county, Hungary.

== Notable people ==
- Mavro Sachs - Croatian physician, first lecturer of the University of Zagreb and founder of forensic medicine in Croatia
- Rabbi Mnachem Samuel - leader and rabbi of this village; killed by the Nazis in 1944
- Laszlo Kiss - judge
