= Nándor Kiss =

Serbian politician

- Kiss Nándor

Member of the National Assembly of the Republic of Serbia
- In office 3 August 2020 – 1 August 2022

Personal details
- Born: 14 October 1993 (age 31); Senta, Vojvodina, Serbia, FR Yugoslavia
- Political party: VMSZ

Nándor Kiss (Serbian Cyrillic: Нандор Киш, romanized: Nandor Kiš; born 14 October 1993) is a Serbian politician from the country's Hungarian community. He was a member of the Serbian parliament from 2020 to 2022, serving with the Alliance of Vojvodina Hungarians (VMSZ).

== Early life and career ==
Kiss was born in Senta in the province of Vojvodina, Serbia, in what was then the Federal Republic of Yugoslavia. Raised in nearby Ada, he completed economic high school in Senta in 2012, graduated from the University of Novi Sad (Subotica branch) Faculty of Economics in 2016, and received a master's degree from same university in 2017. After the end of his parliamentary term, Kiss started a business called Profession VET (Vocational Education and Training). He lives in Ada.

== Politician ==
Kiss joined the VMSZ in 2016. At the end of that year, he worked in Brussels for a month as an intern to Member of the European Parliament (MEP) Andor Deli. From 2018 to 2024 (excluding his parliamentary term), he worked for Serbia's Hungarian National Council. He was elected as president of the VMSZ's youth forum in 2019 and held this role until 2023.

=== Parliamentarian ===
Kiss received the ninth position on the VMSZ's electoral list in the 2020 Serbian parliamentary election and was elected when the party won a record nine seats against the backdrop of a boycott by most major opposition parties. The VMSZ continued its support for Serbia's government led by the Serbian Progressive Party (SNS) after the election. During his parliamentary term, Kiss was a member of the education committee (Note: Formally known as the Committee on Education, Science, Technological Development, and the Information Society.) and the subcommittee on the information society and digitization, a deputy member of the agriculture committee (Note: Formally known as the Agriculture, Forestry, and Water Management Committee.) and the committee on human and minority rights and gender equality, and a member of the parliamentary friendship groups with Italy and Malta.

He also appeared in the fourth position on the VMSZ's list for Ada in the 2020 Serbian local elections, which were held concurrently with the parliamentary vote, and won a seat in the local assembly when the party won eleven out of twenty-nine mandates.

=== Since 2022 ===
Kiss was given the sixteenth position on the VMSZ's list in the 2022 parliamentary election. The party won five seats, and he was not re-elected. He later appeared in the forty-ninth position on the party's list in the 2023 election; election from this position was not a realistic prospect, and he was not elected when the list won six seats.

He was a nominal VMSZ candidate for Ada in the 2024 local elections, appearing in the eighteenth position on the party's list. The list won nine seats, and he was not elected.
