= Peter Kiss (disambiguation) =

Péter Kiss (1959–2014) was a Hungarian Socialist politician.

Peter Kiss, Péter Kiss or Peter Kihss, may also refer to:

- Peter Kiss (basketball) (born 1997), American college basketball player
- Péter Kiss (mathematician) (1937–2002), Hungarian mathematician
- Péter Kiss (mountaineer) (1986–2013), Hungarian mountaineer
- Péter Pál Kiss (born 2003), Hungarian paracanoeist
- Peter Kihss (died 1984), American journalist

== See also ==
- Asteroid 199688 Kisspéter, named after the aforementioned mountaineer
