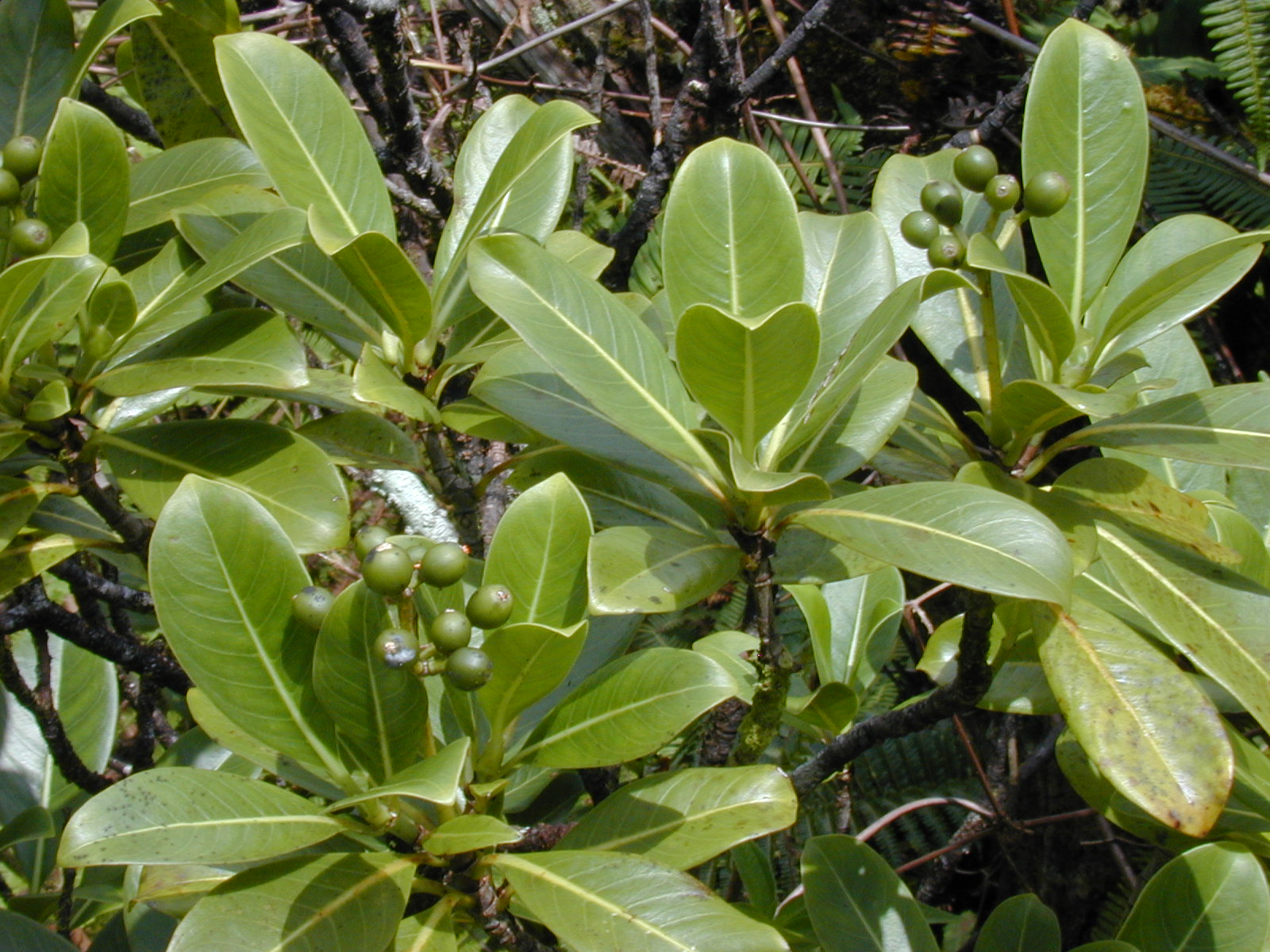

Conservation status
- Vulnerable (IUCN 3.1)

- Vulnerable (NatureServe)

Scientific classification
- Kingdom: Plantae
- Clade: Tracheophytes
- Clade: Angiosperms
- Clade: Eudicots
- Clade: Asterids
- Order: Gentianales
- Family: Rubiaceae
- Genus: Psychotria
- Species: P. mariniana

Binomial name
- Psychotria mariniana (Cham. & Schltdl.) Fosberg

Synonyms
- Coffea mariniana Cham. & Schltdl.

= Psychotria mariniana =

Species of plant

Psychotria mariniana, the forest wild coffee or kōpiko, is a tree endemic to Hawaiʻi. The plant belongs to the Rubiaceae (coffee) family, subfamily Rubioideae. It is a tree of varying size with a dark bark, shiny leaves, and orange oval fruit.

A distinctive line of glands along the bottom of the central vein of each leaf connects this plant to the Hawaiian word for it, since piko means navel (in Hawaiian). The word kōpiko applies to all the Hawaiian plants in the genus Psychotria.

== See also ==
- Kopiko (brand)
