= István Kiss =

István Kiss may refer to:

- István Kiss (architect) (1857–1902), Hungarian architect
- István Kiss (decathlete) (1924–2011), Hungarian decathlete; see 1946 European Athletics Championships – Men's decathlon
- István Kiss (footballer) (born 1970), Hungarian footballer
- István Kiss (gymnast) (1948–2025), Hungarian Olympic gymnast
- István Kiss (long-distance runner) (born 1940), Hungarian long-distance runner; 1966 European Athletics Championships – Men's 5000 metres
- István Kiss (sculptor) (1927–1997), Hungarian sculptor
- István Kiss (water polo) (born 1958), Hungarian former water polo player

== See also ==
- István Szegedi Kis (16th century), Calvinist theologian; see Ráckeve
