= Kojatice (Třebíč District) =

- Municipality
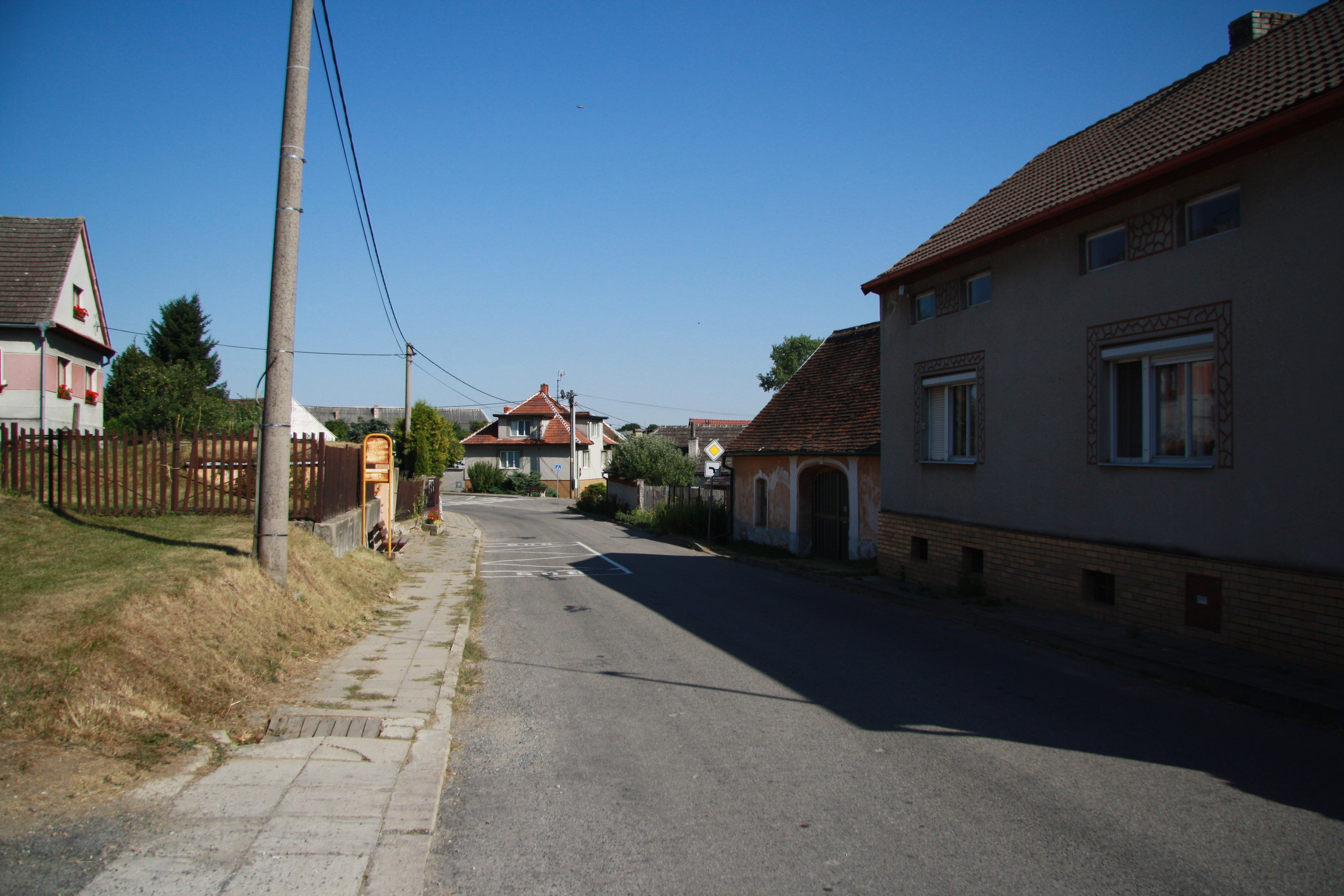
- Eastern part of Kojatice

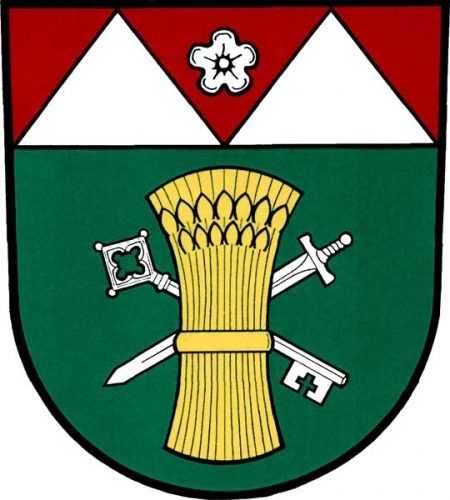
- Flag Coat of arms

- Location in the Czech Republic
- Coordinates: 48°59′56″N 15°42′11″E
- Country: Czech Republic
- Region: Vysočina
- District: Třebíč
- First mentioned: 1227

Area
  - Total: 5.63 km^{2} (2.17 sq mi)
- Elevation: 414 m (1,358 ft)

Population (2026-01-01)
  - Total: 231
  - Density: 41.0/km^{2} (106/sq mi)
- Time zone: UTC+1 (CET)
  - Summer (DST): UTC+2 (CEST)
- Postal code: 675 32
- Website: www.kojatice.cz

Kojatice is a municipality and village in Třebíč District in the Vysočina Region of the Czech Republic. It has about 200 inhabitants.

Kojatice lies approximately 27 kilometres (17 mi) south-west of Třebíč, 45 km (28 mi) south of Jihlava, and 153 km (95 mi) south-east of Prague.

== Administrative division ==
Kojatice consists of two municipal parts (in brackets population according to the 2021 census):

- Kojatice (182)
- Velký Újezd (108)

== Demographics ==
Historical population
| Year | Pop. | ±% |
|---|---|---|
| 1869 | 380 | — |
| 1880 | 438 | +15.3% |
| 1890 | 397 | −9.4% |
| 1900 | 408 | +2.8% |
| 1910 | 406 | −0.5% |
| 1921 | 384 | −5.4% |
| 1930 | 358 | −6.8% |
| 1950 | 491 | +37.2% |
| 1961 | 586 | +19.3% |
| 1970 | 544 | −7.2% |
| 1980 | 513 | −5.7% |
| 1991 | 424 | −17.3% |
| 2001 | 370 | −12.7% |
| 2011 | 272 | −26.5% |
| 2021 | 290 | +6.6% |
Source: Censuses
