= József Kiss (engineer) =

József Kiss de Kissáros
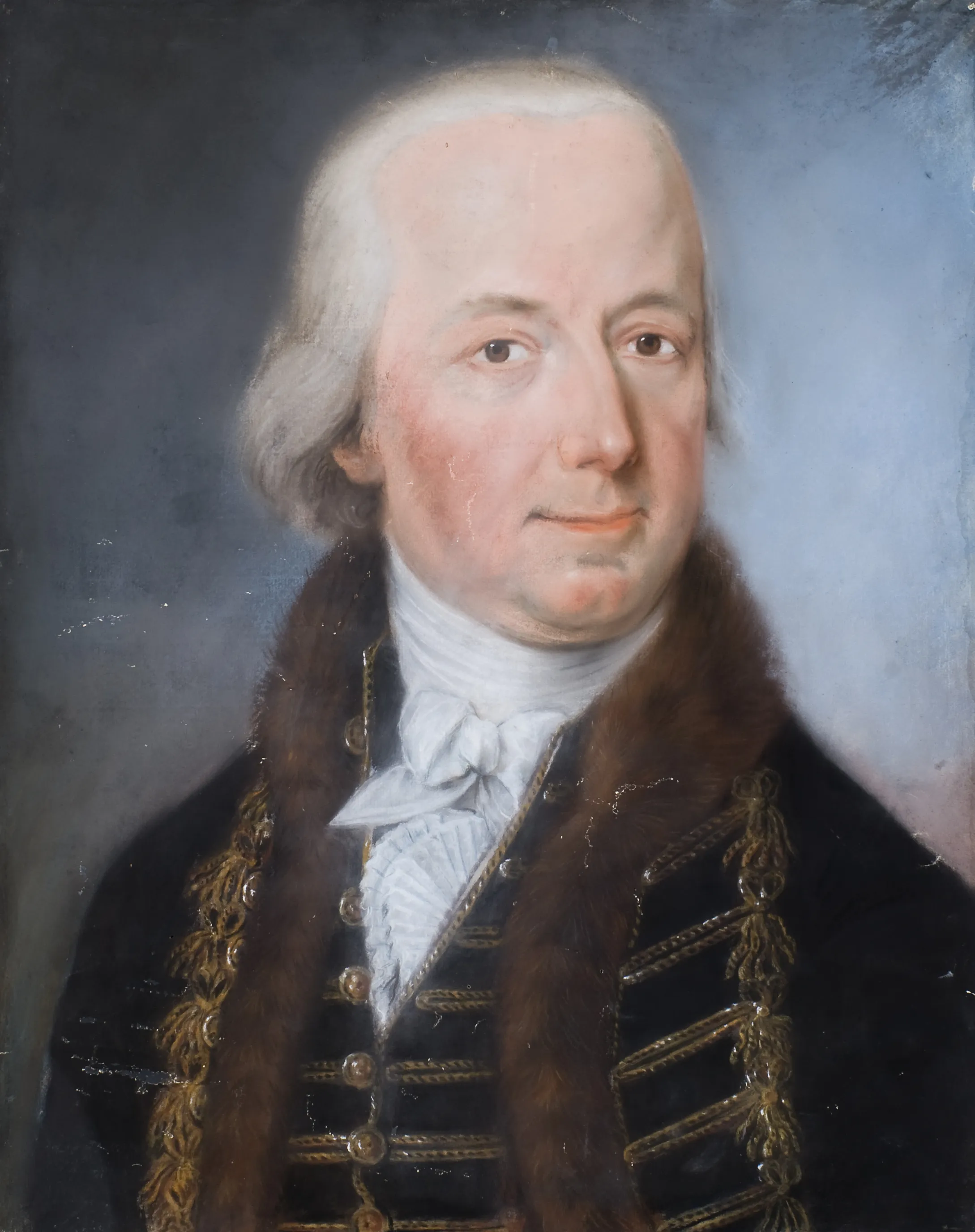
- Portrait of József Kiss de Kissáros by Kálmán Tichy. Exhibited at the Lutheran Central Museum.
- Born: 19 March 1748; Buda, Habsburg monarchy (modern-day Hungary)
- Died: 13 March 1813 (aged 64); Sombor, Habsburg monarchy, (modern-day Serbia)
- Occupation: engineer
- Known for: Great Bačka Canal
- Spouse: Karolina Fischer (m. 1782–1805)
- Children: Mihály Kiss (born 1784) Karolina Kiss (born 1786)
- Scientific career
- Fields: Hydrotechnical engineering
- Patrons: Maria Theresa and Joseph II
- Notable students: János Schmausz

József Kiss de Kissáros (Hungarian: kissárosi Kiss József; Serbian Cyrillic: Јожеф Киш; 19 March 1748 – 13 March 1813) was a Hungarian hydrotechnical engineer. He is best known for his work as the architect of the Great Bačka Canal/Ferenc-csatorna, an important hydrotechnical and transport structure in the Bačka/Bácska region of modern-day Serbia and Hungary. Architects built upon his ideas and incorporated the canal into the Danube-Tisa-Danube Canal system.

== Early life ==
József Kiss de Kissáros was born on 19 March 1748 in Buda (modern-day Budapest), Hungary, into a family with a strong military heritage. His family was ennobled in 1691 by Holy Roman Emperor Leopold I in Turóc County, adopting the nobiliary particle “de Kissáros” (Hungarian: kissárosi). He was the son of Johann Kiss de Kissáros, a military officer, and Maria Tuczentaller, a noblewoman. Although born in Buda, his mother’s family was based in Prešov, where his father also resided when not abroad with the military. All of his siblings were born in Prešov, and he spent much of his early life there, raised in a household with a strong military tradition. He had two brothers, István (born 22 August 1751) and Gabriel (born 21 November 1752), as well as three other siblings who died in infancy. His father, serving as a lieutenant colonel, participated in the Seven Years’ War and was fatally wounded at the Battle of Hochkirch in 1758.

After their father’s death in battle, József and Gábor were entitled to state-financed education in Wiener Neustadt, where they both enrolled at the Theresian Military Academy. Upon completing his military training, József pursued further studies in engineering. In 1768, he was awarded an imperial scholarship from Co-Emperor Joseph II to study hydraulic engineering in the Netherlands and Great Britain.

== Career ==
Returning to Habsburg Hungary, he was appointed as a military engineer. Soon after, in the 1770s, he abandoned military service to become a civil engineer working for the Hofkammer, the main financial institution of the Habsburg monarchy. His first duty was regulating the water level of the Danube near Pressburg. He later transferred to the outskirts of Vienna. Records mention him as a clerk of the Hofkammer around 1780. In 1782, Joseph II initiated a migration from the southeastern regions of Germany to the area surrounding the Podunavlje, hoping to provide a stable economic situation for the migrating German population. At the same time, Kiss first arrived in Bácska. However, a serious water supply problem arose and threatened the migration efforts; the southern edge of the Telek Highlands were covered with morasses, marshes and bogs, and east of Verbász lay the Crna bara (English: "black pools"), a water catchment area. Those areas were natural habitats for malaria-bearing mosquitoes. Much of the migrating population became infected, which seriously hampered settlement efforts. This problem could be solved through drainage of the marshy areas, which would eliminate the mosquitoes' breeding grounds.

In 1785, Kiss proposed that a ditch, one meter in width, be dug between Kula and Verbász to drain the area. The following year, another channel was dug between Verbász and Szivác, also overseen by Kiss.

In 1787, as soon as the Szivác - Verbász channel was completed, he analyzed the terrain between the Danube and Tisza, and determined a 7.27 meter elevation difference between the two rivers. He believed that this would allow for the creation of a canal between them, that would run through the Crna bara.

In 1788, the Hofkammer appointed Kiss as the lead engineer for Bácska (Dirigirender Hofkammer—Ingenieur), with responsibilities including supplying lumber to the military and facilitating navigation through the region’s waterways.

In the meantime, his younger brother Gábor had arrived in Bácska to help József with construction of the Franzenskanal, staying there to assist until he was called to serve in the military.

== Canal ==
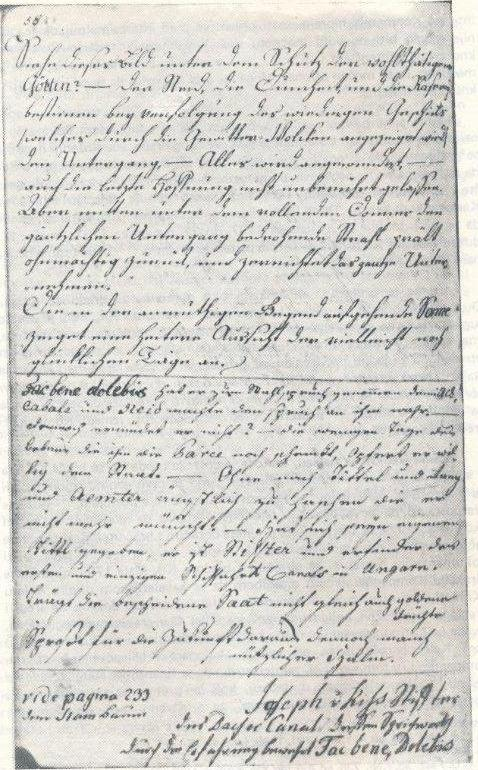
Page of Kiss’ notebook next to his self-portrait: note the Latin phrase “Fac bene dolebis” (English: “do good and you will regret it”) in the middle of the page, Kiss evidently expressing disappointment with the perceived ungratefulness of his contemporaries.

The Kiss brothers submitted an application to Leopold II, which in one part stated:

“The undersigned two brothers, guided by the aspiration to benefit their homeland take the courage to suggest to your royal highness most humbly the connection of the Danube near Monoštor with the Tisa near Bačko Gradište by the means of a navigable channel [...] The situation and plan of the level, accurately determined on their expense, show the possibility of creating such a channel, as well as its great possible benefit on commerce, factories, manufactures [...] and the benefit on the land quality in such a beautiful province.”

In 1792, they received the license to build the canal and formed an association with 800,000 forints of seed capital. The association was called The Privileged Hungarian Shipping Society (Hungarian: Ferencz csatornai kir. Szabadalmazott Hajózási Társaság). The work on the canal started in spring of 1793 under the supervision of József Kiss.

During the time, the government was involved in several wars. Despite this, construction of the canal continued. A shortage of laborers further slowed progress. Estimates were around 2000 at the beginning of the project, decreasing over time. Although the monarchy had promised 4000 soldiers for the project, only two regiments were sent, which constructed barracks and scanned the transverse profiles of the foundation pits for the lock and channel sections. Slovak soldiers, arriving from Bácsföldvár undertook many of the same duties. Later, about 500 convicts were brought to the site and forced to work in harsh conditions. Since the convicts were poorly dressed and badly fed, their performance suffered accordingly, and so they were later withdrawn. Confronted with the worker shortage, Kiss placed job notices around the territory.

Challenges arose during the first year of work on the Monostorszeg lock. The high water pressure of the Danube caused water to flow in the working pit and create sludge. Freshly built slopes frequently collapsed, and substantial groundwater flow into the work pits caused further problems.

However, the work continued, and after four years, the waterway became navigable to the point of Sztapár.

In 1796, an anonymous tip informed the association that the canal was behind schedule and over budget. Despite Kiss’ explanations, he was expelled from the association and stripped of all authority. Kiss and his brother had invested heavily in the project, and his expulsion led to his and his brother’s financial ruin.

Stanislav Hepe (Hungarian: Нерре Szaniszló) was appointed to replace Kiss, and continued the project from 1797 to 1801.

When finished in 1802, the Danube - Tisza channel had reached the length of 110 kilometers. This length is cited on all maps published after the completion of the channel. As a result, the voyage from Bezdán to the Tisza was shortened by 258 kilometers. This saved about 10 days on a downstream journey, and 20 on an upstream journey.

The stimulus that commerce, manufacturing and navigation received influenced the increased development of nearby settlements such as Apatin, Czoborszentmihály, Cservenka, Kúla, Verbász, Bácsszenttamás and Óbecse. An important function of the channel was also melioration, especially east of Verbász, as much of the wide, marshy terrain around the banks of the canal was drained and turned into fertile soil.

== Epilogue ==
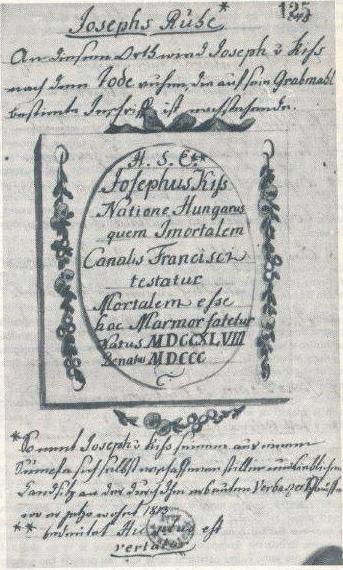
The sketch of his desired epitaph

Stripped of all functions in the association, Kiss returned to his job as the leading engineer for Bačka. When he finally retired after 42 years of work, he received only a quarter of his pension from the Hofkammer, which was about 312 forints annually. The other three quarters were garnished in order to repay debts that he incurred after his expulsion from the association. He built a summer house near Vrbas, which he called Josephsruhe (English: “József's peace”). He spent the rest of his life there, until his death on 13 March 1813, and was buried nearby.

Kiss’ notebook, titled Stammbuch and written in German and Latin contains entries about his family and work, along with sketches of famous historical figures such as Maria Theresia, Joseph II, and Napoleon Bonaparte. On the last page, he had sketched a desired gravestone and epitaph which reads:

Here lays József Kiss, a Hungarian noble. He is immortal, for the Franz channel stands. He is mortal, for this cold marble. He was born in Buda 14 days before the April calends of 1748. He died in Sombor, among his friends from Bačka, on the third day of the March idas of 1813.

== Legacy ==
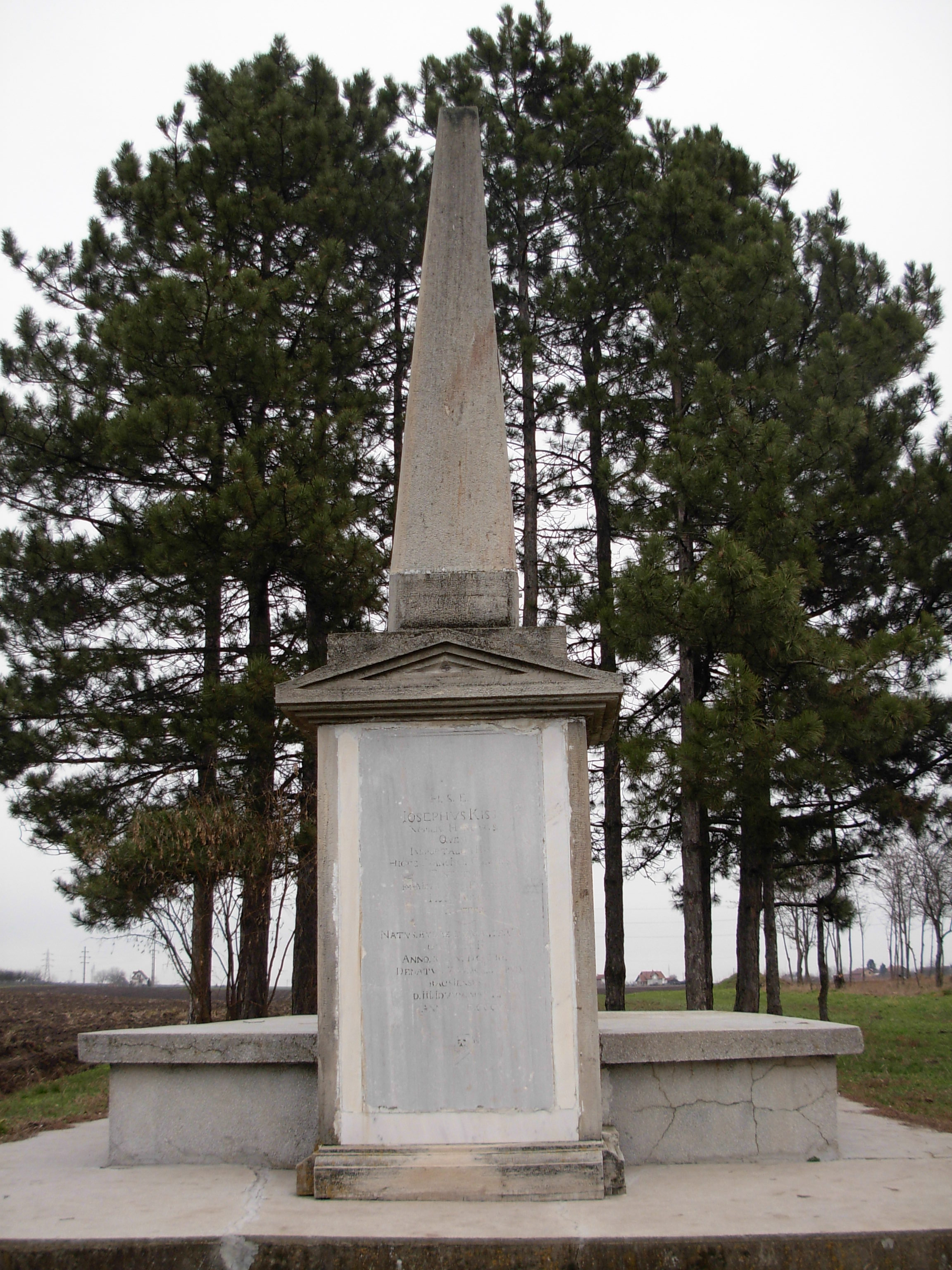
The tomb of József Kiss

As the creator of one of the first major hydrotechnical works in the area surrounding the Podunavlje, Kiss laid the foundations for an expansion of hydrotechnical construction in the hydrographically complex region of Bačka.
