= László Kiss =

László Kiss may refer to:

== Sports ==
- László Kiss (footballer) (born 1956), Hungarian coach and former footballer, played in the 1982 World Cup
- László Kiss (football manager) (born 1949), Hungarian football manager
- László Kiss (politician) (born 1979), Hungarian politician, mayor of the 3rd district of Budapest
- László Kiss (rower) (1951–2016), Hungarian Olympic rower
- László Kiss (swimmer) (born 1940), Hungarian swimmer and coach

== Others ==
- László Kiss-Rigó, Bishop since 2006 of the Roman Catholic Diocese of Szeged–Csanád
- László Kiss, member of the Hungarian underground rock band Európa Kiadó
- László Kiss, Mayor of the Hungarian village Lúč na Ostrove
- László Kiss (judge) (1951–2026), Hungarian judge
- László L. Kiss (born 1972), Hungarian astronomer and discoverer of minor planets
