= Tamás Kiss =

Tamás Kiss may refer to:

- Tamás Kiss (canoeist) (born 1987), Hungarian sprint canoer and marathon canoeist
- Tamás Kiss (footballer, born 1979), Hungarian footballer for Paksi SE
- Tamás Kiss (footballer, born 1987), Hungarian footballer for Rákospalotai EAC
- Tamás Kiss (footballer, born 2000), Hungarian footballer for Wisła Kraków
- Tamás Pál Kiss (born 1991), Hungarian auto racing driver
