= Kojatice, Prešov District =

Village and municipality in Slovakia

Kojatice
- Municipality
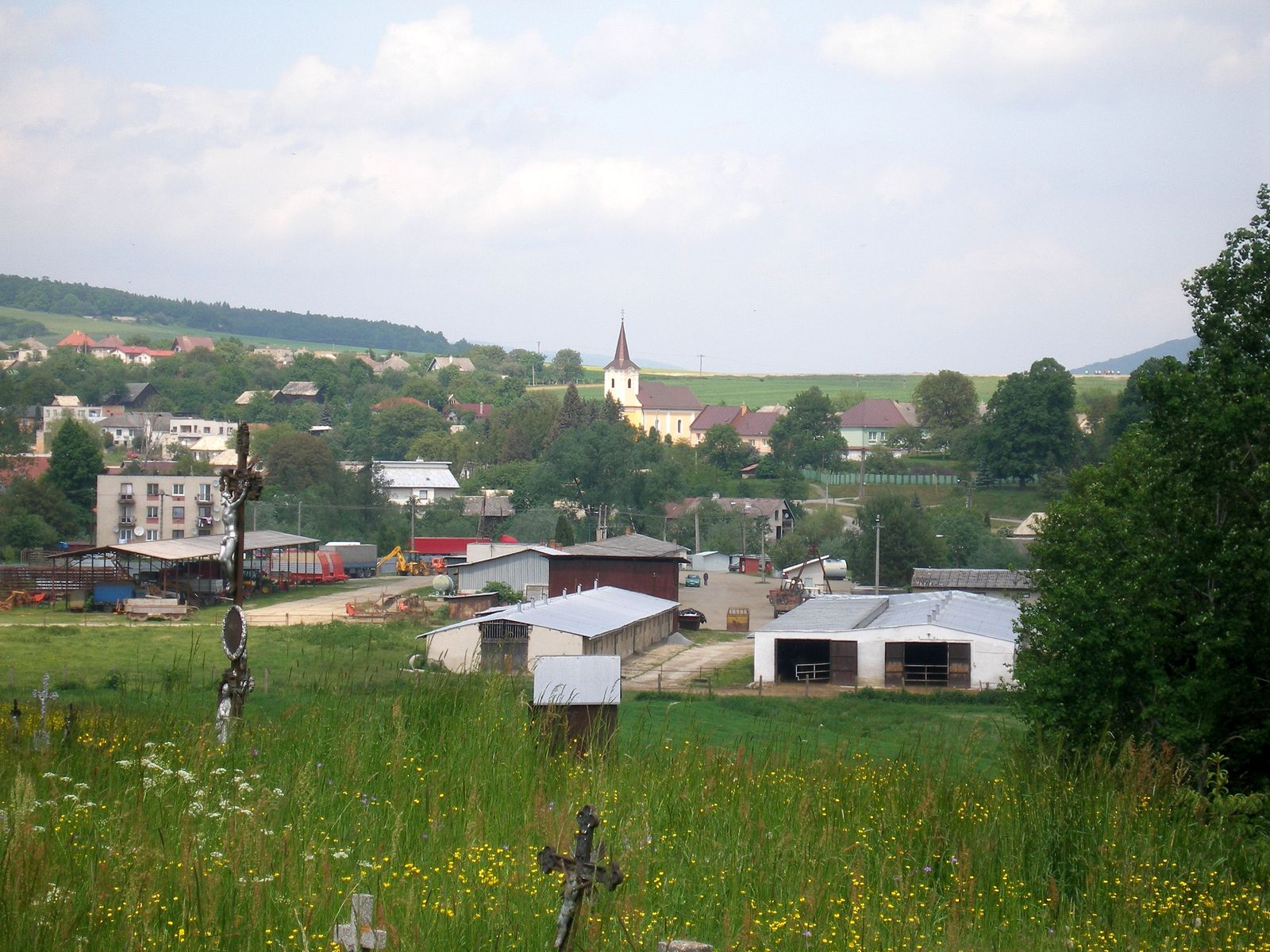

- Flag Coat of arms

- Location of Kojatice in the Prešov Region Location of Kojatice in Slovakia
- Coordinates: 49.00°N 21.13°E
- Country: Slovakia
- Region: Prešov
- District: Prešov
- First mentioned: 1248

Area
  - Total: 10.68 km^{2} (4.12 sq mi)
- Elevation: 335 m (1,099 ft)

Population (2025)
  - Total: 1,176
- Time zone: UTC+1 (CET)
  - Summer (DST): UTC+2 (CEST)
- Postal code: 823 2
- Area code: +421 51
- Vehicle registration plate (until 2022): PO
- Website: www.kojatice.sk

Kojatice (Hungarian: Kajáta) is a village and municipality in Prešov District in the Prešov Region of eastern Slovakia.

== History ==
In historical records the village was first mentioned in 1248.

== Geography ==
The municipality lies at an altitude of 335 metres (1,099 ft) and covers an area of 10.68 km^{2} (4.12 sq mi) (2025).

== Population ==
Population statistic (10 years)
Year	1995	2005	2015	2025
Count	930	1023	1103	1176
Difference		+10%	+7.82%	+6.61%

Population statistic
Year	2024	2025
Count	1158	1176
Difference		+1.55%

It has a population of 1176 people (31 December 2025).

=== Ethnicity ===
Census 2021 (1+ %)
Ethnicity	Number	Fraction
Slovak	937	81.19%
Romani	190	16.46%
Not found out	52	4.5%
Total	1154	

In year 2021 was 1154 people by ethnicity 937 as Slovak, 190 as Romani, 52 as Not found out, 3 as Rusyn, 2 as Italian, 2 as German, 2 as Moravian, 1 as Czech, 1 as Ukrainian, 1 as Polish and 1 as French.

Note on population: The difference values of population numbers in the table "Population statistic" and in the sections "Ethnicity" & "Religion" is caused by the use of various statistical methods.

=== Religion ===
Census 2021 (1+ %)
Religion	Number	Fraction
Roman Catholic Church	987	85.53%
Evangelical Church	64	5.55%
None	51	4.42%
Not found out	29	2.51%
Greek Catholic Church	15	1.3%
Total	1154	

In year 2021 was 1154 people by religion 987 from Roman Catholic Church, 64 from Evangelical Church, 51 from None, 29 from Not found out, 15 from Greek Catholic Church, 3 from Other, 1 from Eastern Orthodox Church, 1 from Christian Congregations in Slovakia, 1 from Hinduism, 1 from Apostolic Church and 1 from Ad hoc movements.

== Genealogical resources ==
The records for genealogical research are available at the State Archive in Prešov.

- Lutheran church records (births/marriages/deaths): 1720–1895 (parish B)

== See also ==
- List of municipalities and towns in Slovakia
