= Kopiko (brand) =

Indonesian confectionery

- Logo of Kopiko coffee

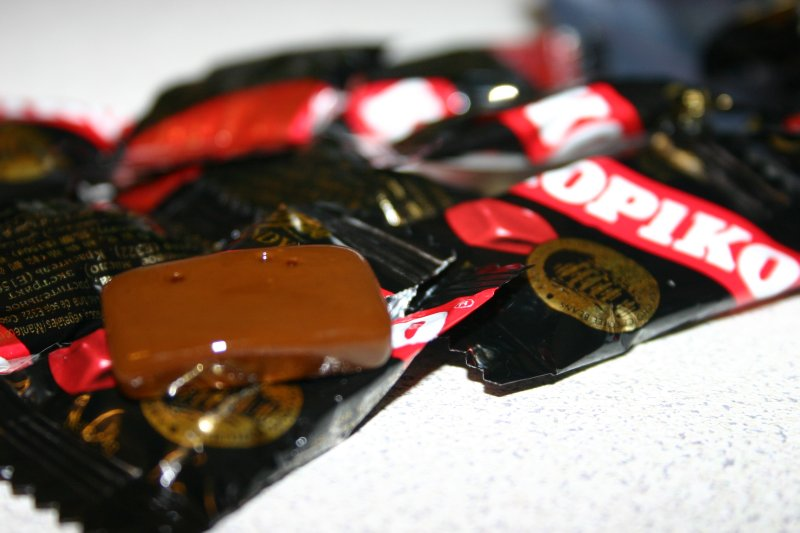
- Kopiko candies
- Product type: Coffee, candy
- Current owner: Mayora Indah
- Country: Indonesia
- Introduced: 1982; 44 years ago
- Markets: Worldwide
- Tagline: "Enjoy Coffee Anytime, Anywhere" "Gantinya Ngopi'" (coffee drinking replacement) "Our Creamiest, Ngayon Creamier" (Kopiko Blanca, Philippines only)

Kopiko is an Indonesian brand of coffee flavored candy and confectioneries originally produced in Indonesia owned by Mayora Indah. It is named after the kōpiko coffee bean, found in Hawaii.

Kopiko Coffee Candy is currently available in over 80 countries. It is especially popular in South Korea, due in part to frequent product placement in K-dramas.

== Ingredients ==
Kopiko Coffee Candy contains extract from real coffee beans. Ingredients include sugar, glucose, vegetable oil (palm oil and/or coconut oil), coffee extract (4.9%), butter, soy lecithin, caramel color, salt, and natural coffee flavor.

== Flavors ==
Three candy flavors are available: original coffee, cappuccino and espresso

== Advertising ==
Since 2021, Kopiko has enjoyed an increase in global brand recognition through product placements in popular Korean dramas, most notably Hometown Cha-Cha-Cha (2021) Vincenzo (2021), Castaway Diva (2023), Connection (2024), and Brave New World (2026).
