= 2019 Persebaya Surabaya season =

Persebaya Surabaya
2019 season
- Owner: PT Persebaya Indonesia
- President: (Indonesia) Azrul Ananda
- Headcoach: (Indonesia) Aji Santoso
- Homeground: Gelora Bung Tomo Stadium, Surabaya
- Liga 1: Runner-up
- Indonesian Cup: Quarter-finals
- Indonesia President's Cup: Runner-up
- Top goalscorer: League: All: Amido Baldé (14)
- Highest home attendance: 50,000 vs Madura United
- Lowest home attendance: 11,000 vs Persidago
- Biggest win: (Away) 0-8 vs Persinga
- Biggest defeat: (Away) 0-2 vs Arema F.C.
Home colours	Away colours	Alternate colours
- All statistics correct as of 4 May 2019.

The 2019 season is the second season for Persebaya Surabaya after being reaccepted as a member of PSSI, in the 2018 season, Persebaya was ranked 5th.

== Squad information ==
=== Current squad ===
N	Pos.	Nat.	Name	Age	Since	App	Goals	Ends	Transfer fee	Notes
1	GK	(Indonesia)	Abdul Rohim	27	2019	2	0	2020	Free	
2	DF	(Indonesia)	Novan Sasongko	29	2019			2020	Free	
3	MF	(Indonesia)	Koko Ari Araya	19	2019		0	2021		Academy graduate
5	DF	(Indonesia)	Otavio Dutra	35	2018			2020		the process of naturalization as an Indonesian citizen
6	MF	(Indonesia)	Misbakus Solikin	26	2017			2019		Vice captain
8	MF	(Indonesia)	Oktafianus Fernando	25	2017			2020		
9	FW	(Guinea-Bissau)	Amido Baldé	28	2019		14	2020	Free	
10	MF	(Bolivia)	Damián Lizio	29	2019			2020	Free	
11	FW	(Indonesia)	Muhammad Supriadi	17	2019			2023		Academy graduate
12	MF	(Indonesia)	Rendi Irwan	32	2017			2020		
13	DF	(Indonesia)	Rachmat Irianto	19	2017			2020		
14	MF	(Indonesia)	Ruben Sanadi	32	2018			2020		Captain
17	MF	(Indonesia)	Elisa Basna	22	2019			2020	Free	
18	MF	(Indonesia)	Muhammad Kemaluddin	20	2019			2020		Academy graduate
20	FW	(Indonesia)	Osvaldo Haay	21	2018			2020		
22	DF	(Indonesia)	Abu Rizal Maulana	24	2017			2020		
23	DF	(Indonesia)	Hansamu Yama	24	2019			2020	Free	
29	DF	(Indonesia)	Mokhamad Syaifuddin	26	2017			2020		
33	GK	(Indonesia)	Miswar Saputra	23	2017			2020		
41	FW	(Indonesia)	Irfan Jaya	23	2017			2020		
44	DF	(Indonesia)	Andri Muliadi	32	2017			2020		
63	MF	(Tajikistan)	Manuchekhr Dzhalilov	28	2019			2020	Free	
72	MF	(Indonesia)	Zulfikar Akhmad	18	2019			2020		Academy graduate
82	GK	(Indonesia)	Imam Arief Fadillah	29	2019			2020	Persib Bandung	
88	MF	(Indonesia)	Muhammad Alwi Slamat	22	2019			2020	Free	
90	MF	(Indonesia)	Nelson Alom	28	2018	0	0	2020		
96	MF	(Indonesia)	Muhammad Hidayat	23	2017			2020		

Updated to match played 18 May 2019-end of season
Source: Persebaya Surabaya
Ordered by squad number. Appearances include league and cup appearances, including as substitute. Age stated as at end of 2018 season.

=== Naturalized player ===
Country	Player
Brazil	Otavio Dutra

=== Starting eleven ===
4-3-3

== Transfer ==
=== Pre-season ===
==== Transfer in ====
Pos.	Player	Transferred from	Type	Date	Transfer Window	Ref
DF	(Indonesia) Novan Sasongko	(Indonesia) Bali United	Free	8 January 2019	Pre-season	
DF	(Indonesia) Hansamu Yama	(Indonesia) Barito Putera	Free	16 January 2019	Pre-season	
GK	(Indonesia) Imam Arief Fadillah	(Indonesia) Persib Bandung	Free	16 January 2019	Pre-season	
MF	(Indonesia) Muhammad Alwi Slamat	(Indonesia) PSMS Medan	Free	25 January 2019	Pre-season	
MF	(Indonesia) Elisa Basna	(Indonesia) Persipura Jayapura	Free	30 January 2019	Pre-season	
FW	(Guinea-Bissau) Amido Baldé	(Libya) Al-Nasr SC	Free	5 February 2019	Pre-season	
FW	(Tajikistan) Manuchekhr Dzhalilov	(Indonesia) Sriwijaya	Free	6 February 2019	Pre-season	
GK	(Indonesia) Abdul Rohim	(Indonesia) PSMS Medan	Free	8 February 2019	Pre-season	
MF	(Bolivia) Damián Lizio	(Bolivia) Club Bolívar	Free	21 February 2019	Pre-season	
FW	(Brazil) David da Silva	(South Korea) Pohang Steelers	Free	1 September 2019	Mid-season	
MF	(Australia) Aryn Williams	(India) NEROCA F.C.	Free	27 August 2019	Mid-season	
MF	(Brazil) Diogo Campos Gomes	(Indonesia) Kalteng Putra	Undisclosed	17 September 2019	Mid-season	

==== Transfer Out ====
Pos.	Player	Transferred to	Type	Date	Transfer Window	Source
DF	(Indonesia) Fandry Imbiri	(Indonesia) Madura United	Free	29 December 2018	Pre-season	
DF	(Indonesia) Irvan Febrianto	(Indonesia) Persiba	End of contract	1 January 2019	Pre-season	
FW	(Indonesia) Yohanes Pahabol	(Indonesia) Kalteng Putra	Free	3 January 2019	Pre-season	
MF	(Indonesia) Adam Maulana	(Indonesia) Persiba	End of contract	3 January 2019	Pre-season	
FW	(Indonesia) Rishadi Fauzi	(Indonesia) Mitra Kukar	End of contract	4 January 2019	Pre-season	
GK	(Indonesia) Dimas Galih	(Indonesia) Kalteng Putra	End of contract	5 January 2019	Pre-season	
GK	(Indonesia) Alfonsius Kelvan	(Indonesia) Borneo	Free	7 January 2019	Pre-season	
FW	(Brazil) David da Silva	(South Korea) Pohang Steelers	Free	9 January 2019	Pre-season	
DF	(Indonesia) O.K. John	(Indonesia) Kalteng Putra	Free	17 January 2019	Pre-season	
FW	(Indonesia) Ricky Kayame	(Indonesia) Arema	Free	27 February 2019	Pre-season	
FW	(Guinea-Bissau) Baldé	(Indonesia) PSM Makassar	Free	1 September 2019	Mid-season	
FW	(Tajikistan) Manuchekhr Dzhalilov	Unattached	Release	17 September 2019	Mid-season	
MF	(Bolivia) Damián Lizio	Unattached	Release	17 September 2019	Mid-season	

== Pre-season and Friendlies ==
=== President's Cup ===
In this 2019 President's Cup Persebaya is joined in group A along with Persib Bandung, Perseru Serui, and TIRA-Persikabo. All matches were held at Si Jalak Harupat Stadium, Soreang, Bandung, West Java.

=== Group A ===
Pos	Team	Pld	W	D	L	GF	GA	GD	Pts	Qualification
1	Persebaya (A)	3	2	1	0	6	4	+2	7	Knockout stage
2	TIRA-Persikabo (A)	3	2	1	0	5	3	+2	7	Possible knockout stage
3	Perseru (E)	2	0	0	2	4	6	−2	0	
4	Persib (H, E)	2	0	0	2	3	5	−2	0	

Updated to match(es) played on 12 Maret 2019. Source: Matches
(A) Advance to a further round; (E) Eliminated; (H) Hosts

=== Matches ===
2 March 2019 Group stage	Perseru	2-3	Persebaya	Bandung
19.00 Wib.	Akbar 34'; Delvin 39'	Report	A. Balde 63', 88'; M. Dzalilov 90'	Stadium: Si Jalak Harupat; Attendance: 7,850; Referee: Wawan Rapiko

7 March 2019 Group stage	Persebaya	3-2	Persib	Bandung
15.30 Wib.	Dzhalilov 37', 50'; Irfan 77'		Erwin 32'; Frets 86'	Stadium: Si Jalak Harupat; Attendance: 27,000; Referee: Nusur Fadillah

12 March 2019 Group stage	TIRA-Kabo	0-0	Persebaya	Bandung
15.40 Wib.				Stadium: Si Jalak Harupat; Attendance: 1,462; Referee: Nusur Fadillah

=== Knockout stage ===
Persebaya qualified for the knock out stage after becoming the top of the group A. Once again Persebaya met TIRAPersikabo when a knockout stage drawing.

Matches

29 March 2019 Knock out stage	Persebaya	3 - 1	TIRA-Kabo	Surabaya
18.30 Wib.				Stadium: Gelora Bung Tomo; Attendance: 42324

=== Semi-final ===
Persebaya qualified for Semi-final stage after Win from TIRAPersikabo in quarter final Stage. In the semi-final Persebaya met Madura United in Home Away Match.

3 April 2019 First leg	Persebaya	1 - 0	Madura United	Surabaya
15.30 Wib.	Dzhalilov 64'	Report		Stadium: Gelora Bung Tomo; Attendance: 50,000; Referee: Agus Fauzan Arifin

6 April 2019 Second leg	Madura United	2–3	Persebaya	Pamekasan
19:00 Wib.	Rakić 54'; Gonçalves 68'	Report	Dutra 61'; Baldé 82'; Hansamu 90+4'	Stadium: Gelora Ratu Pamelingan Stadium; Attendance: 12,860; Referee: Yudi Nurcahya

=== Final ===
Persebaya qualified for Final stage after Win from Madura United in semi final Stage. In the Final Persebaya meet Arema in Home Away Match.

9 April 2019 First leg	Persebaya	2–2	Arema	Surabaya
15.30 Wib.	Irfan 7'; Lizio 72' (pen.)	Report	Hendro 33'; Konaté 79'	Stadium: Gelora Bung Tomo; Attendance: 50,000; Referee: Oki Dwi Putra

12 April 2019 Second leg	Arema	2–0	Persebaya	Malang
20:00 Wib.	Hardianto 43'; Kayame 90+2'	Report		Stadium: Kanjuruhan Stadium; Attendance: 42,000; Referee: Nusur Fadillah

=== Friendlies ===
11 May 2019 Friendly	Persebaya	2–1	Persela	Surabaya
19:00	Otavio Dutra 8'; Damián Lizio 45'	Report	Alex Gonçalves 46'	Stadium: Gelora Bung Tomo Stadium; Attendance: 35,000

=== Liga 1 ===
==== League table ====
Locations of the 2019 Liga 1 teams

Pos	Team	Pld	W	D	L	GF	GA	GD	Pts	Qualification or relegation
1	Bali United (C)	34	19	7	8	48	35	+13	64	Qualification for the AFC Champions League preliminary round 1 and ASEAN Club Championship group stage
2	Persebaya (Note: Persebaya would have qualified for the AFC Cup group stage had Bali United qualified for the AFC Champions League group stage. As Bali United failed to qualify for the AFC Champions League group stage, Persebaya's qualification in the AFC Cup was annulled.)	34	14	12	8	57	43	+14	54	Qualification for the ASEAN Club Championship group stage
3	Persipura	34	14	11	9	47	38	+9	53 (Note: Head-to-head points: Persipura (+2) 9 pts; Bhayangkara (+2) 7 pts; Madura United (–4) 1 pts.)	
4	Bhayangkara	34	14	11	9	51	43	+8	53	
5	Madura United	34	15	8	11	55	44	+11	53	

Source: Shopee Liga 1 2019, Soccerway
Rules for classification: 1) Points; 2) Head-to-head; 3) Goal difference; 4) Goals scored; 5) Drawing.
(C) Champions

==== Fixtures ====
The Liga 1 (Indonesia) fixtures for the 2019 season were announced on 4 April 2019.

16 May 2019 1	Bali United F.C.	2–1	Persebaya Surabaya	Bali
20:30	Ilija Spasojević 15'; Paulo Sérgio 49'	Report	Mokhamad Syaifuddin 30'	Stadium: Kapten I Wayan Dipta Stadium; Attendance: 15,323; Referee: Dodi Setia Purnama

21 May 2019 2	Persebaya Surabaya	1–1	Kalteng Putra F.C.	Surabaya, East Java
20:30	Misbakus Solikin 23'	Report	Patrich Wanggai 26'	Stadium: Gelora Bung Tomo Stadium; Attendance: 10,247; Referee: Dwi Purba Adi Wicaksana

30 May 2019 3	Persebaya Surabaya	1–1	PSIS Semarang	Surabaya, East Java
20:30	Novan Sasongko (yellow card) 10'; Osvaldo Haay 28'; Osvaldo Haay (yellow card) 60'; Elisa Basna (yellow card) 90+2'	Report	Safrudin Tahar (yellow card) 10'; Septian David (yellow card) 56'; Septian David 74'; Patrick Mota (yellow card) 89'	Stadium: Gelora Bung Tomo Stadium; Attendance: 40,000; Referee: Mochammad Adung

23 June 2019 5	Borneo F.C.	1–2	Persebaya Surabaya	Samarinda, East Kalimantan
18:30	Asri Akbar (yellow card) 85'; Terens Puhiri 88'	Report	Muhammad Hidayat (yellow card) 31'; Ruben Sanadi 41'; Oktafianus Fernando 71'	Stadium: Segiri Stadium; Attendance: 6,725; Referee: Oki Dwi Putra

1 July 2019 6	Persebaya Surabaya	3–2	Persela Lamongan	Surabaya, East Java
18:30	Oktafianus Fernando 17'; Irfan Jaya 61'; Amido Baldé 66'; Misbakus Solikin (yellow card) 74'; Osvaldo Haay (yellow card) 84'; Damián Lizio (yellow card) 86'	Report	Lucky Wahyu 3'; Alex Gonçalves 55'; Moch Zaenuri (yellow card) 92'	Stadium: Gelora Bung Tomo Stadium; Attendance: 10,027; Referee: Yudi Nurcahya

5 July 2019 7	Persebaya Surabaya	4–0	Persib Bandung	Surabaya, East Java
18:30	Amido Baldé 34' 44' 58'; Irfan Jaya 81'; Amido Baldé (yellow card) 90'	Report	Ardi Idrus (yellow card) 22'	Stadium: Gelora Bung Tomo Stadium; Attendance: 50,000; Referee: Aprisman Aranda

9 July 2019 4	Persebaya Surabaya	2–2	PS Barito Putera	Surabaya, East Java
18:30	Damián Lizio 79'; Manuchekhr Dzhalilov 87'	Report	Rafael Silva 69'; Rafael Silva 90+1'	Stadium: Gelora Bung Tomo Stadium; Attendance: 9,127; Referee: Oki Dwi Putra

13 July 2019 8	PSS Sleman	2–1	Persebaya Surabaya	Sleman, Yogyakarta
18:30	Yevhen Bokhashvili 39'; Haris Tuharea 56'	Report	Damián Lizio 27'	Stadium: Maguwoharjo; Attendance: 28,655; Referee: Faulur Rosy

17 July 2019 9	PSM Makassar	2–1	Persebaya Surabaya	Makassar, South Sulawesi
18:30	Guy Junior 18'; Ferdinand Sinaga 68'	Report	Irfan Jaya 41'	Stadium: Andi Mattalata; Attendance: 10,930; Referee: Nusur Fadilah

21 July 2019 10	Persebaya Surabaya	1–1	TIRA-Persikabo	Surabaya, East Java
18:30	Rachmat Irianto 45'	Report	Wawan Febrianto 64'	Stadium: Gelora Bung Tomo Stadium; Attendance: 19,274; Referee: Yudi Nurcahya

27 July 2019 11	Semen Padang F.C.	0–0	Persebaya Surabaya	Padang, West Sumatra
19:00	Irsyad Maulana (yellow card) 49'; Manda Cingi (yellow card) 82'	Report	Irfan Jaya (yellow card) 41'; Muhammad Hidayat (yellow card) 90'	Stadium: Haji Agus Salim; Attendance: 6,981; Referee: Darma Santoso Gulo

2 August 2019 12	Persebaya Surabaya	1–0	Persipura Jayapura	Surabaya, East Java
18:30	Irfan Jaya 32'; Rachmat Irianto (yellow card) 12'; Amido Baldé (yellow card) 33'	Report	Oh In-kyun (yellow card) 22'; Muhammad Tahir (yellow card) 44'; Titus Bonai (yellow card) 62'; André Ribeiro (yellow card) 78'	Stadium: Gelora Bung Tomo Stadium; Attendance: 10,027; Referee: Fariq Hitaba

10 August 2019 13	Persebaya Surabaya	2–2	Madura United F.C.	Surabaya, East Java
18:30	Amido Baldé 42'; Irfan Jaya 80' (pen.)	Report	Beto Gonçalves 11' 67' (pen.)	Stadium: Gelora Bung Tomo Stadium; Attendance: 18,727; Referee: Oki Dwi Putra

15 August 2019 14	Arema F.C.	4–0	Persebaya Surabaya	Malang, East Java
18:30	Dendi Santoso 30'; Arthur Cunha 71'; Sylvano Comvalius 86'; Makan Konaté 90'	Report	Andri Muliadi (yellow card) 25'; Oktafianus Fernando (yellow card) 77'	Stadium: Kanjuruhan Stadium; Attendance: 37,406; Referee: Yudi Nurcahya

19 August 2019 15	Badak Lampung F.C.	1–3	Persebaya Surabaya	Bandar Lampung
15:30	Zainal Haq 26'; Syahrul Mustofa (yellow card) 26'; Akbar Tanjung (yellow card) 45'	Report	Irfan Jaya 11' 17'; Osvaldo Haay 44'; Abu Rizal Maulana (yellow card) 36'	Stadium: Sumpah Pemuda Stadium; Attendance: 7,110; Referee: Nusur Fadilah

24 August 2019 16	Persebaya Surabaya	1–1	Persija Jakarta	Surabaya, East Java
15:30	Muhammad Hidayat (yellow card) 18'; Misbakus 80' (pen.); Manuchekhr Dzhalilov (yellow card) 88'	Report	Novri Setiawan (yellow card) 49'; Simic 68'; Rohit Chand (yellow card) 83'; Rezaldi Hehanusa (yellow card) 90'	Stadium: Gelora Bung Tomo Stadium; Attendance: 50,000; Referee: Aprisman Aranda

31 August 2019 17	Bhayangkara F.C.	0–2	Persebaya Surabaya	Bekasi, West Java
15:30	Nurhidayat (yellow card) 70'	Report	Oktafianus 33'; Rachmat Irianto (yellow card) 54'; Osvaldo Haay (yellow card) 60'; David da Silva 79'	Stadium: Patriot Chandrabhaga Stadium; Attendance: 2,389; Referee: Asep Yandis

11 September 2019 18	Kalteng Putra F.C.	1–1	Persebaya Surabaya	Palangka Raya, Central Kalimantan
18:30	Diogo 29'; Dadang Apridianto (yellow card) 82'; Takuya Matsunaga (yellow card) 90'	Report	Osvaldo Haay 14'; Rendi Irwan (yellow card) 31'; Muhammad Hidayat (yellow card) 87'	Stadium: Tuah Pahoe Stadium; Attendance: 6,800; Referee: Fariq Hitaba

20 September 2019 19	PSIS Semarang	0–4	Persebaya Surabaya	Magelang, Central Java
15:30	Frendi Saputra (yellow card) 73'; Claudir Marini Junior (yellow card) 90'	Report	Dutra 28'; Da Silva 44'; Diogo 48'; Oktafianus Fernando (yellow card) 54'; Osvaldo 64'; Abu Rizal Maulana (yellow card) 90'	Stadium: Moch. Soebroto Stadium; Attendance: - Referee: Ikhsan Prasetya Jati

24 September 2019 20	Persebaya Surabaya	1–1	Bali United F.C.	Surabaya, East Java
18:30	Osvaldo 34'; Osvaldo (yellow card) 84'; Aryn Glen Williams (yellow card) 33'	Report	Nouri (yellow card) 31'; Fadil 88'; Fadil (yellow card) 76'; Al Ayyubi (yellow card) 84'; Dias Angga Putra (yellow card) 84'	Stadium: Gelora Bung Tomo Stadium; Attendance: 32,450; Referee: Oki Dwi Putra

28 September 2019 21	PS Barito Putera	1–0	Persebaya Surabaya	Martapura, South Kalimantan
18:30	Kosuke Uchida (yellow card) 60'; Rafael Silva 67'	Report	Ruben Sanadi (yellow card) 66'; Diogo Campos (yellow card) 72'	Stadium: Demang Lehman; Attendance: 4,973; Referee: Aprisman Aranda

11 October 2019 22	Persebaya Surabaya	0–0	Borneo F.C.	Surabaya, East Java
18:30	Dutra (yellow card) 23'; Irfan Jaya (yellow card) 83'	Report	Sultan Samma (yellow card) 44'; Ambrizal Umanailo (yellow card) 52'; Gianluca Pandeynuwu (yellow card) 89'	Stadium: Gelora Bung Tomo Stadium; Attendance: 9,027; Referee: Annas Apriliandi

18 October 2019 23	Persib Bandung	4–1	Persebaya Surabaya	Bali
18:30	Febri Hariyadi 31'; Achmad Jufriyanto 40'; Esteban Vizcarra (yellow card) 38'; Kevin van Kippersluis 60'; Febri Hariyadi 84'	Report	Andri Muliadi (yellow card) 58'; Diogo Campos (yellow card) 35' (yellow-red card) 79'; Diogo Campos 71' (pen.)	Stadium: Kapten I Wayan Dipta Stadium; Attendance: 8,451; Referee: Agus Fauzan Arifin

23 October 2019 24	Persela Lamongan	1–0	Persebaya Surabaya	Lamongan, East Java
15:30	Malik Risaldi 45'; Izmy Hatuwe (yellow card) 35'; Lucky Wahyu (yellow card) 63'	Report	Abu Rizal Maulana (yellow card) 35'; Hansamu Yama (yellow card) 45'; Muhammad Hidayat (yellow card) 45'	Stadium: Surajaya; Attendance: 17,000; Referee: Dodi Setia Purnama

29 October 2019 25	Persebaya Surabaya	2–3	PSS Sleman	Surabaya, East Java
15:30		Report		Stadium: Gelora Bung Tomo Stadium; Attendance: 21,111; Referee: Thoriq Alkatiri

2 November 2019 26	Persebaya Surabaya	v	PSM Makassar	Surabaya, East Java
18:30		Report		Stadium: Gelora Bung Tomo Stadium

9 November 2019 27	TIRA-Persikabo	v	Persebaya Surabaya	Bogor Regency, West Java
15:30		Report		Stadium: Pakansari

24 November 2019 28	Persipura Jayapura	v	Persebaya Surabaya	Jayapura, Papua
18:30		Report		Stadium: Mandala Stadium

28 November 2019 29	Persebaya Surabaya	v	Semen Padang F.C.	Surabaya, East Java
18:00		Report		Stadium: Gelora Bung Tomo Stadium

2 December 2019 30	Madura United F.C.	v	Persebaya Surabaya	Pamekasan, East Java
18:30		Report		Stadium: Gelora Madura

8 December 2019 31	Persebaya Surabaya	v	Bhayangkara F.C.	Surabaya, East Java
18:30		Report		Stadium: Gelora Bung Tomo Stadium

12 December 2019 32	Persebaya Surabaya	v	Arema F.C.	Surabaya, East Java
15:30		Report		Stadium: Gelora Bung Tomo Stadium

17 December 2019 33	Persija Jakarta	v	Persebaya Surabaya	Jakarta
15:30		Report		Stadium: Gelora Bung Karno

22 December 2019 34	Persebaya Surabaya	v	Badak Lampung F.C.	Surabaya, East Java
18:30		Report		Stadium: Gelora Bung Tomo Stadium

=== Piala Indonesia ===
2 September 2018 First round	PSBI	0–14	Persebaya	Surabaya, East Java
15:00		Report	Haay 7', 49'; Dutra 12' (pen.), 82'; Irwan 36'; Da Silva 41', 44', 45', 60'; Abu Rizal 63'; Rishadi 66'; Oktafianus 72'; Sanadi 80'; Kayame 84'	Stadium: Jala Krida Bumimoro AAL Stadium
Note: This match was originally scheduled on 1 July 2018 but the police did not give permission for the match to be held on that day.

23 December 2018 Second round	PSKT West Sumbawa	2–4	Persebaya	Mataram, West Nusa Tenggara
14:00	Jumardih 18', 77'	Report	Misbakus 39' (pen.); Fandi 49'; Rendi 71'; Jaya 88'	Stadium: December 17th Stadium; Referee: Novari Ikhsan

9 February 2019 Round of 32 1st Leg	Persinga	Cancelled	Persebaya	Ngawi, East Java
15:00				Stadium: Ketonggo Stadium
Note: This match was originally scheduled on 22 January 2019 but it was postponed because they didn't get police permit to hold the match in Ketonggo Stadium, Ngawi. This match already postponed for four times (from 22 January to 30 January, then 5 February, and lastly 9 February). And finally it was decided that this match would not be held.

16 February 2019 Round of 32 2nd Leg	Persebaya	8–0 (8–0 agg.)	Persinga	Surabaya, East Java
16:00	Baldé 1', 23', 48', 61'; Jaya 13', 69'; Dzhalilov 79'; Irwan 90+1'	Report		Stadium: Gelora Bung Tomo Stadium; Referee: Rully Ruslin Tambutina
Note: This match was originally scheduled on 7 February 2019. But later, it became just single match instead of two-legged match.

19 February 2019 Round of 16 1st Leg	Persidago	1–4	Persebaya	Gorontalo, Gorontalo
14:00	Panto 90+1' (pen.)	Report	Irwan 49'; Dzhalilov 73'; Baldé 84', 90+3'	Stadium: January 23rd Stadium; Referee: Ahmad Tuharea

23 February 2019 Round of 16 2nd Leg	Persebaya	7–0 (11–1 agg.)	Persidago	Surabaya, East Java
15:00	Baldé 27', 29', 56', 87'; Dutra 34'; Hansamu 37'; Lizio 45+1'	Report		Stadium: Gelora Bung Tomo Stadium; Referee: Fariq Hitaba

19 June 2019 Quarter-finals 1st Leg	Persebaya	1–1	Madura United	Surabaya, East Java
16:00	Haay 54'	Report	Rakić 3'	Stadium: Gelora Bung Tomo Stadium; Attendance: 30,000; Referee: Fariq Hitaba
Note: This match was originally scheduled on 25 April 2019 but it will be postponed to 19 June 2019 as the two teams competing do not earn police permit to hold the match because the police are more focused on securing 2019 Indonesian general election.

27 June 2019 Quarter-finals 2nd Leg	Madura United	2–1 (3–2 agg.)	Persebaya	Pamekasan, East Java
15:30	Gonçalves 6', 22'	Report	Lizio 20'	Stadium: Gelora Madura; Referee: Dodi Setia Purnama
Note: This match was originally scheduled on 30 April 2019 but it will be postponed to 27 June 2019 as the two teams competing do not earn police permit to hold the match because the police are more focused on securing 2019 Indonesian general election.
