= 2018 Persebaya Surabaya season =

Persebaya Surabaya
2018 season
- Owner: PT. Persebaya Indonesia
- President: Azrul Ananda
- Headcoach: Djajang Nurdjaman
- Stadium: Gelora Bung Tomo Stadium, Surabaya
- Liga 1: 5th
- Indonesian Cup: First round
- President's Cup: Quarter-finals (knocked out by PSMS Medan)
- Top goalscorer: League: David da Silva (20); All: David da Silva (24)
- Highest home attendance: 55,000 vs. Arema FC
- Biggest win: Bali United 2-5 Persebaya
- Biggest defeat: PSMS 4-0 Persebaya
Home colours	Away colours	Alternate colours
- All statistics correct as of 10 December 2018.

The 2018 season was the first Liga 1 (Indonesia) for Persebaya Surabaya as from Liga 1 (Indonesia) establishment in 2017. They comeback in top-flight competition after being re-accepted as a member of PSSI. In 2017 Persebaya played in Liga 2 (Indonesia) and became champions.

== Players ==
=== Current squad ===
As of 14 July 2018

No.	Name	Nat.	Date of birth (age)	Since	Signed from	Apps	Goals
Goalkeepers
33	Miswar Saputra	(Indonesia)	April 19, 1996 (aged 21)	2017	(Indonesia) Persiraja Banda Aceh	15	0
89	Alfonsius Kelvan	(Indonesia)	June 21, 1989 (aged 28)	2018	(Indonesia) Bali United F.C.	0	0
92	Dimas Galih Pratama	(Indonesia)	November 23, 1992 (aged 25)	2017	(Indonesia) Persegres Gresik United	8	0
Defenders
4	O.K. John	(Indonesia)	June 22, 1983 (aged 34)	2018	(Indonesia) Madura United F.C. (Loan)	0	0
5	Otávio Dutra	(Brazil)	November 22, 1983 (aged 34)	2018	(Indonesia) Bhayangkara F.C.	0	0
13	Rachmat Irianto	(Indonesia)	September 3, 1999 (aged 18)	2018	(Indonesia) Youth System	0	0
14	Ruben Sanadi	(Indonesia)	January 8, 1987 (aged 30)	2017	(Indonesia) Persipura Jayapura	3	0
21	Fandry Imbiri	(Indonesia)	April 5, 1991 (aged 26)	2018	(Indonesia) Semen Padang F.C.	0	0
22	Abu Rizal Maulana	(Indonesia)	April 27, 1994 (aged 23)	2016	(Indonesia) Persesa Sampang	25	1
25	Irvan Febrianto	(Indonesia)	October 9, 1996 (aged 21)	2017	(Indonesia) Youth System	15	0
29	Mokhamad Syaifuddin	(Indonesia)	August 9, 1992 (aged 25)	2017	(Indonesia) PSS Sleman	11	0
44	Andri Muliadi	(Indonesia)	February 26, 1993 (aged 24)	2017	(Indonesia) Persiraja Banda Aceh	20	0
Midfielders
6	Misbakus Solikin	(Indonesia)	September 1, 1992 (aged 25)	2017	(Indonesia) Persatu Tuban	22	11
10	Robertino Pugliara	(Argentina)	February 21, 1984 (aged 33)	2018	(India) FC Pune City	0	0
12	Rendi Irwan	(Indonesia)	April 26, 1987 (aged 30)	2017	(Indonesia) Persija Jakarta	28	2
18	Adam Maulana	(Indonesia)	March 26, 1997 (aged 20)	2018	(Indonesia) Youth System	0	0
17	Fandi Eko Utomo	(Indonesia)	March 2, 1991 (aged 26)	2018	(Indonesia) Madura United F.C.	0	0
82	Izaac Wanggai	(Indonesia)	March 19, 1982 (aged 35)	2018	(Indonesia) Persipura Jayapura	0	0
90	Nelson Alom	(Indonesia)	October 27, 1990 (aged 27)	2018	(Indonesia) Persipura Jayapura	0	0
96	Muhammad Hidayat	(Indonesia)	April 26, 1992 (aged 25)	2017	(Indonesia) Youth System	16	0
98	Raphael Maitimo	(Indonesia)	March 17, 1984 (aged 33)	2018	(Indonesia) Madura United F.C. (Loan)	0	0
Forwards
8	Oktafianus Fernando	(Indonesia)	September 4, 1993 (aged 24)	2017		17	5
9	Ricky Kayame	(Indonesia)	September 21, 1993 (aged 24)	2017	(Indonesia) Persipura Jayapura	3	2
11	Yohanes Pahabol	(Indonesia)	January 16, 1992 (aged 25)	2018	(Indonesia) Persipura Jayapura	0	0
17	David Da Silva	(Brazil)	November 12, 1989 (aged 28)	2018	(Qatar) Al-Khor	0	0
20	Osvaldo Haay	(Indonesia)	May 17, 1998 (aged 19)	2018	(Indonesia) Persipura Jayapura	0	0
26	Rishadi Fauzi	(Indonesia)	July 4, 1990 (aged 27)	2017	(Brazil) Madura United F.C.	15	7
41	Irfan Jaya	(Indonesia)	April 1, 1996 (aged 21)	2017	(Indonesia) PSM Makassar	20	11

=== Starting XI ===
4–3–3

== Transfer ==
=== Out ===
- Samuel Reimas
- Rangga Muslim
- Taufan Hidayat
- Mei Handoko
- Nerius Alom
- Abdul Azis
- Said Mardjan
- Rahmat Juliandri
- Kurniawan Karman
- Yogi Novrian
- Sidik Saimima
- Arthur Irawan
- Reky Rahayu

== Pre-season and friendlies ==
At the beginning of the 2018 season Persebaya preceded by following the pre-season event that is President Cup and a friendly match against Sarawak FA from Malaysia.

=== President's Cup ===
In this President's Cup 2018 group stages, Persebaya was in group (C) using home match system and Persebaya was chosen as the host.

Group Stage

- All matches played in Surabaya, East Java
- Times listed are local (UTC+7:00)

Pos	Team	Pld	W	D	L	GF	GA	GD	Pts	Qualification
1	Persebaya (H)	3	2	1	0	4	1	+3	7	Advance to quarter-finals
2	Madura United	3	2	0	1	8	2	+6	6	Advance to quarter-finals
3	PS TNI	3	1	1	1	6	6	0	4	
4	Perseru	3	0	0	3	2	11	−9	0	

Source: Piala Presiden 2018
Rules for classification: 1) Points; 2) Goal difference; 3) Number of goals scored 4) Head-to-head 5) Drawing.
(H) Hosts

Matches

18 January 2018 1	Persebaya	1-1	PS TNI	Surabaya
15.30 WIB (Group C)	Y. Pahabol 76'; Miswar S. (red card) 15'	Report	M. Lestusen 68'	Stadium: Gelora Bung Tomo; Attendance: 26.000

21 January 2018 2	Perseru	0-2	Persebaya	Surabaya
19.30 WIB (Group C)		Report	R. Fauzi 41'; I. Jaya 90+2'	Stadium: Gelora Bung Tomo; Attendance: 26.000

28 January 2018 3	Persebaya	1-0	Madura United	Surabaya
15.30 WIB (Group C)	Y. Pahabol 30'	Report		Stadium: Gelora Bung Tomo; Attendance: 30.000

Knockout Stage

Persebaya stalled in the knockout stage because lost against PSMS Medan through a penalty kicks.

3 February 2018 Quarterfinals	Persebaya	3-3 (3-4 p)	PSMS	Surakarta
15.30 WIB	Y. Pahabol 13'; I. Jaya 32' (pen.); N. Alom 69'	Report	W. Yessoh 5'; S. Urikhob 42'; F. Butuan 46'	Stadium: Manahan; Attendance: 40.000
	Penalties
	M. Solikin (penalty scored); F. Imbiri (penalty scored); F. Pahabol (penalty missed); A.R. Maulana (penalty missed); O. Dutra (penalty missed); O. Fernando (penalty scored); Osvaldo H. (penalty missed)		R. Lobo (penalty missed); L. Raharjo (penalty scored); N'Guessan (penalty scored); S. Urikhob (penalty missed); F. Butuan (penalty missed); Suhandi (penalty scored); A. Azis (penalty scored)

=== Blessing Game ===
Persebaya invite Sarawak FA, Malaysia for friendlies titled Blessing game, this friendly match aims to be grateful because Persebaya successfully become Liga 2 champion and promotion to Liga 1.

18 March 2018 Blessing game	Persebaya (Indonesia)	2-2	(Malaysia) Sarawak	Surabaya
15.30 WIB	O. Fernando 60'; O. Dutra 90+2'	Report	M. Roskan 54'; M. Roskan 59'	Stadium: Gelora Bung Tomo; Attendance: 22.000

== Liga 1 ==
=== League table ===
Locations of the 2018 Liga 1 teams

Pos	Team	Pld	W	D	L	GF	GA	GD	Pts
3	Bhayangkara (Note: Bhayangkara would have qualified for the AFC Cup group stage had Persija qualified for the AFC Champions League group stage. As Persija failed to qualify for the AFC Champions League group stage, Bhayangkara's qualification in the AFC Cup was annulled.)	34	15	8	11	41	39	+2	53
4	Persib	34	14	10	10	49	41	+8	52
5	Persebaya	34	14	8	12	60	48	+12	50 (Note: Head-to-head results: Persebaya 1–0 Arema; Arema 1–0 Persebaya)
6	Arema	34	14	8	12	53	42	+11	50
7	Borneo	34	14	6	14	50	49	+1	48 (Note: Head-to-head results: Madura United 1–2 Borneo, Borneo 2–2 Madura United)

Source: Go-Jek Liga 1, Soccerway
Rules for classification: 1) Points; 2) Head-to-head; 3) Goal difference; 4) Goals scored; 5) Drawing.

=== Results summary ===
Overall								Home						Away					
Pld	W	D	L	GF	GA	GD	Pts	W	D	L	GF	GA	GD	W	D	L	GF	GA	GD
13	4	6	3	17	15	+2	18	3	2	1	6	4	+2	1	4	2	11	11	0

Last updated: 26 June 2018.
Source: http://liga-indonesia.id/

=== Results by matchday ===
Matchday	1	2	3	4	5	6	7	8	9	10	11	12	13
Ground	H	A	H	A	H	A	H	A	H	A	H	A	A
Result	W	D	L	W	D	L	W	D	P	D	D	D	L
Position	2	1	2	4	6	9	3	4	6	11	9	12	14

Updated to match(es) played on 26 June 2018. Source: Liga 1
A = Away; H = Home; W = Win; D = Draw; L = Loss; P = Postponed

=== Matches ===
Match listing:

25 March 2018 1	Persebaya	1–0	Perseru	Surabaya
18.30 WIB	Pugliara 70'; O. Fernando (yellow card) 86'	Report	Boman Irie (yellow card) 24'	Stadium: Gelora Bung Tomo; Attendance: 25.000

30 March 2018 2	Persela	1–1	Persebaya	Lamongan
15.30 WIB	A. Ayyubi (yellow card) 12'; S. Arifin (yellow card) 50'; D. Assis 57'; Kustiawan (yellow card) 59'	Report	Misbakus (yellow card) 34'; Da Silva 70'; Oktavianus (yellow card) 86'	Stadium: Surajaya; Attendance: 15.000

8 April 2018 3	Persebaya	1–2	Barito Putera	Surabaya
18.30 WIB	Abu Rizal 17'; O. Dutra (yellow card) 20'	Report	D. Packer 27'; Paulo (yellow card) 66'; Sitanggang 70'; A. Evans (yellow card) 90+1'	Stadium: Gelora Bung Tomo; Attendance: 27.000

13 April 2018 4	PS TIRA	1–4	Persebaya	Bantul
15.30 WIB	D. Drajad 82'	Report	Da Silva 4', 31', 70'; Osvaldo 45'; Pugliara (yellow card) 52' (yellow-red card)	Stadium: Sultan Agung; Attendance: 20.000

22 April 2018 5	Persebaya	1–1	Sriwijaya	Surabaya
18.30 WIB	Da Silva 11'	Report	Gonzalves 45+2'; H. Yoo (yellow card) 58'; M. N'diaye (yellow card) 81'; A. Alis (yellow card) 84'	Stadium: Gelora Bung Tomo; Attendance: 30.000

29 April 2018 6	Mitra Kukar	3–1	Persebaya	Tenggarong
15.30 WIB	D. Guthrie (yellow card) 21'; Rodriguez 35', 55'; A. Suyono (red card) 67'; R. Siregar (yellow card) 75'; D. Hartono 90'	Report	S. Saimima (yellow card) 19', (goal) 47'; I. Febrianto (yellow card) 28'; Pahabol (yellow card) 59'; A. Maulana (yellow card) 69'	Stadium: Aji Imbut

6 May 2018; East Java Derby 7	Persebaya	1–0	Arema	Surabaya
15.30 WIB	M. Solikin 82'; N. Alom (yellow card) 78'; Oktavianus (red card) 90+4'	Report	A. Rocha (yellow card) 74'; Hendro (red card) 90+4'	Stadium: Gelora Bung Tomo; Attendance: 55.000; Referee: Novari Ikhsan

11 May 2018 8	Borneo	2–2	Persebaya	Samarinda
15.30 WIB	L. Eliandry 66' (pen.), 86'; A. Rachman (yellow card) 43'; T. Bonai (yellow card) 40'; Al Hadji (yellow card) 77'	Report	Irfan J. 47'; F. Pahabol 78'; R. Sanadi (yellow card) 64'	Stadium: Segiri; Attendance: 15.000

19 May 2018 (Postponed) 9	Persebaya	v	Persib	Surabaya
18.30 WIB		Report		Stadium: Gelora Bung Tomo

25 May 2018; Derby Suramadu 10	Madura United	2–2	Persebaya	Pamekasan
20.30 WIB	A. Antonio 4'; F. Beltrame 45+3'; Z. Krangar (yellow card) 40'; B. Sanggiawan (yellow card) 58'; F. Aryanto (yellow card) 89'	Report	D. da Silva 7'; I. Jaya 42'; F. Imbiri (yellow card) 5'; A.R. Maulana (yellow card) 68'	Stadium: Ratu Pamelingan; Attendance: 15.000

29 May 2018 11	Persebaya	1–1	Persipura	Surabaya
20.30 WIB	F. Imbiri (yellow card) 43', (goal) 65'; O. Fernando (yellow card) 71'	Report	D. Suleiman (yellow card) 30'; M. Tahir (yellow card) 33'; H. Moreira 60'; A. Ibo (yellow card) 85'	Stadium: Gelora Bung Tomo; Attendance: 25.000; Referee: Toriq Alkatiri

26 June 2018 12	Persija	v	Persebaya	Jakarta
20.30 WIB				Stadium: Gelora Bung Karno

9 June 2018 13	PSM	1–0	Persebaya	Makassar
20.30 WIB	W. Pluim (yellow card) 45+2'; R. Pellu 72'	Report	R. Sanadi (yellow card) 60'	Stadium: Andi Mattalatta; Attendance: 15.000; Referee: Oky Dwi Putra

26 June 2018 (Postponed match) 12	Persija	1–1	Persebaya	Jakarta
20.30 WIB	N. Setiawan 51'	Report	R. Fauzi 20'; Y. Pahabol (yellow card) 56'; M. Saputra (yellow card) 65'; F. Imbiri (yellow card) 84'	Stadium: PTIK; Attendance: 2500

7 July 2018 13	Persebaya	1–0	Bali United	Surabaya
18.30 WIB	R. Sanadi (yellow card) 26'; I. Jaya 82'	Report	A. Wiantara (red card) 90'	Stadium: Gelora Bung Tomo; Attendance: 30.000

11 July 2018 14	Bhayangkara	3–3	Persebaya	Jakarta
15.30 WIB	Rishadi 17' (o.g.)	Report		Stadium: PTIK; Attendance: 1,200; Referee: Adi Riyanto

== Indonesian Cup ==
=== Matches ===
1 July 2018 1	PSBI	v	Persebaya	Blitar
15.00 WIB (Postponed)		Report		Stadium: Gelora Bumi Penataran

== Squad statistics ==
=== Squad & Appearances ===
No.	Pos.	Name	Liga 1		Piala Indonesia		Total	
No.	Pos.	Name	Apps	Goals	Apps	Goals	Apps	Goals
Goalkeepers
33	GK	(Indonesia) Miswar Saputra	31	0	1	0	32	0
89	GK	(Indonesia) Alfonsius Kelvan	1	0	1	0	2	0
92	GK	(Indonesia) Dimas Galih Pratama	3	0	0	0	3	0
Defenders
4	DF	(Indonesia) O.K. John	12	1	1	0	13	1
5	DF	(Brazil) Otávio Dutra	23	2	1	2	24	4
13	DF	(Indonesia) Rachmat Irianto	4	0	1	0	5	0
14	DF	(Indonesia) Ruben Sanadi	28	0	1	1	29	1
21	DF	(Indonesia) Fandry Imbiri	22	2	1	0	23	2
22	DF	(Indonesia) Abu Rizal Maulana	28	1	2	1	30	2
25	DF	(Indonesia) Irvan Febrianto	5	0	1	0	6	0
29	DF	(Indonesia) Mokhamad Syaifuddin	16	0	1	0	17	0
44	DF	(Indonesia) Andri Muliadi	13	0	0	0	13	0
Midfielders
6	MF	(Indonesia) Misbakus Solikin	28	2	2	1	30	3
10	MF	(Argentina) Robertino Pugliara	22	1	1	0	23	1
12	MF	(Indonesia) Rendi Irwan	29	2	2	2	31	4
18	MF	(Indonesia) Adam Maulana	3	0	1	0	4	0
17	MF	(Indonesia) Fandi Eko Utomo	18	4	1	1	19	5
82	MF	(Indonesia) Izaac Wanggai	5	0	0	0	5	0
90	MF	(Indonesia) Nelson Alom	7	0	0	0	7	0
96	MF	(Indonesia) Muhammad Hidayat	16	0	0	0	16	0
98	MF	(Indonesia) Raphael Maitimo	2	0	0	0	2	0
Forwards
8	FW	(Indonesia) Oktafianus Fernando	26	1	2	1	28	2
9	FW	(Indonesia) Ricky Kayame	16	1	1	1	17	2
11	FW	(Indonesia) Yohanes Pahabol	25	3	0	0	25	3
17	FW	(Brazil) David Da Silva	23	20	1	4	24	24
20	FW	(Indonesia) Osvaldo Haay	21	10	1	2	22	12
26	FW	(Indonesia) Rishadi Fauzi	18	3	2	1	20	4
94	FW	(Indonesia) Irfan Jaya	21	6	1	1	22	7

Last updated: 10 December 2018.
