= 2017 in Indonesian football =

Football in Indonesia
- Season: 2017

Men's football
- Liga 1: Bhayangkara
- Liga 2: Persebaya Surabaya
- Liga 3: Blitar United

The 2017 season of competitive association football in Indonesia.

== Promotion and relegation ==
=== Pre-season ===
No teams are promoted or relegated as of all of 2015 football competitions in Indonesia abandoned due to a ban by Imam Nahrawi, Minister of Youth and Sports Affairs, against PSSI to run any football competition and in 2016 no official competition was held because FIFA froze the membership of the PSSI, resulting in the suspension of the Indonesian Football Association.

== National team ==
Win Draw Lose

=== Indonesia national football team ===
==== Friendlies ====
21 March	Indonesia	1–3	Myanmar	Bogor, Indonesia
16:00 UTC+7	Hardianto 22'	Report	Maung 39'; Kyaw 74' (pen.); Sithu 90+1'	Stadium: Pakansari Stadium; Attendance: 13,150; Referee: Clifford Daypuyat (Philippines)

8 June	Cambodia	0–2	Indonesia	Phnom Penh, Cambodia
UTC+07		Report	Bachdim 26'; Gian Zola 90+6'	Stadium: Olympic Stadium; Attendance: 70,000; Referee: Warintorn Sassadee (Thailand)

13 June	Indonesia	0–0	Puerto Rico	Sleman, Indonesia
21:00 UTC+7		Report		Stadium: Maguwoharjo Stadium; Attendance: 27,863; Referee: Sukhbir Singh (Singapore)

2 September^{1}	Indonesia	0–0	Fiji	Bekasi, Indonesia
16:00 UTC+07		Report		Stadium: Patriot Candrabhaga Stadium; Attendance: 17,518; Referee: Spartak Danilenko (Kyrgyzstan)

4 October^{1}	Indonesia	3–1	Cambodia	Bekasi, Indonesia
21:00 UTC+07	Lerby 32'; Rezaldi 34'; Septian 49'	Report	Vathanaka 48'	Stadium: Patriot Candrabhaga Stadium; Referee: Sukbir Singh (Singapore)

18 November^{1}	Indonesia	0–1	Syria U-23	Cikarang, Indonesia
18:00 UTC+07		Report	Anez 83'	Stadium: Wibawa Mukti Stadium

25 November	Indonesia	2–1	Guyana	Bekasi, Indonesia
18:30 UTC+07	Spasojević 37' (pen.) 75'	Report	Agard 9'	Stadium: Patriot Candrabhaga Stadium; Referee: Chaireg Ngamson (Thailand)

- ^{1} Not an international FIFA match "A".

==== 2017 Aceh World Solidarity Tsunami Cup ====
Pos	Team	Pld	W	D	L	GF	GA	GD	Pts	Qualification
1	Kyrgyzstan	3	3	0	0	8	0	+8	9	Champion
2	Indonesia	3	2	0	1	7	3	+4	6	
3	Mongolia	2	0	0	2	2	6	−4	0	
4	Brunei	2	0	0	2	0	8	−8	0	

2 December	Indonesia	4–0	Brunei	Banda Aceh, Indonesia
20:15 UTC+07	Hansamu 18'; Septian 25'; Fachrudin 69'; Yabes 89'	Report		Stadium: Harapan Bangsa Stadium; Referee: Oki Dwi Putra (Indonesia)

4 December	Mongolia	2–3	Indonesia	Banda Aceh, Indonesia
16:15 UTC+07	Tögöldör 38' (pen.), 58' (pen.)	Report	Adsit 7'; Haay 25'; Spasojević 45+2' (pen.)	Stadium: Harapan Bangsa Stadium; Referee: Thoriq Alkatiri (Indonesia)

6 December	Indonesia	0–1	Kyrgyzstan	Banda Aceh, Indonesia
21:30 UTC+07		Report	Saliev 20'	Stadium: Harapan Bangsa Stadium; Referee: Mustofha Umarella (Indonesia)

=== Indonesia national under-23 football team ===
==== 2018 AFC U-23 Championship qualification ====
Pos	Team	Pld	W	D	L	GF	GA	GD	Pts	Qualification
1	Malaysia	3	2	0	1	5	3	+2	6	Final tournament
2	Thailand (H)	3	1	2	0	4	1	+3	5	Final tournament
3	Indonesia	3	1	1	1	7	3	+4	4	
4	Mongolia	3	0	1	2	1	10	−9	1	

Source: AFC
Rules for classification: Qualification tiebreakers
(H) Hosts

19 July	Indonesia	0–3	Malaysia	Bangkok, Thailand
16:00 UTC+07		Report	Syafiq 4'; Jafri 20'; Thanabalan 30'	Stadium: National Stadium; Attendance: 360; Referee: Jarred Gillett (Australia)

21 July	Mongolia	0–7	Indonesia	Bangkok, Thailand
16:00 UTC+07		Report	Saddil 17', 56'; Wanewar 31'; Gavin 34', 88'; Haay 71'; Septian 90'	Stadium: National Stadium; Attendance: 296; Referee: Hiroyuki Kimura (Japan)

23 July	Thailand	0–0	Indonesia	Bangkok, Thailand
19:00 UTC+07				Stadium: National Stadium; Attendance: 4,400; Referee: Rowan Arumughan (India)

==== 2017 Southeast Asian Games ====
Pos	Team	Pld	W	D	L	GF	GA	GD	Pts	Qualification
1	Thailand	5	4	1	0	10	1	+9	13	Semi-finals
2	Indonesia	5	3	2	0	7	1	+6	11	Semi-finals
3	Vietnam	5	3	1	1	12	4	+8	10	
4	Philippines	5	2	0	3	4	10	−6	6	
5	Timor-Leste	5	1	0	4	2	8	−6	3	
6	Cambodia	5	0	0	5	1	12	−11	0	

Updated to match(es) played on 24 August 2017. Source: KL2017 Official Website
Rules for classification: 1) Points; 2) Goal difference; 3) Goals scored

15 August Group stage	Indonesia	1–1	Thailand	Shah Alam, Malaysia
UTC+08 16:00	Septian 61' (pen.)	Report	Chaiyawat 14'	Stadium: Shah Alam Stadium; Referee: Wang Di (China)

17 August Group stage	Indonesia	3–0	Philippines	Shah Alam, Malaysia
UTC+08 20:45	Septian 7'; Hargianto 45+1'; Saddil 59'			Stadium: Shah Alam Stadium; Referee: Sudish Kumar Pandey (Nepal)

20 August Group stage	Timor-Leste	0–1	Indonesia	Selayang, Malaysia
UTC+08 16:00		Report	Wanewar 22'	Stadium: Selayang Municipal Council Stadium; Referee: Nagor Amir Noor Mohamed (Malaysia)

22 August Group stage	Vietnam	0–0	Indonesia	Selayang, Malaysia
UTC+08 20:45				Stadium: Selayang Municipal Council Stadium; Referee: Omar Al-Yaquob (Oman)

24 August Group stage	Indonesia	2–0	Cambodia	Shah Alam, Malaysia
UTC+08 16:00	Ezra 56'; Febri 69'			Stadium: Shah Alam Stadium; Attendance: 8.642; Referee: Tejas Nagvenkar (India)

26 August Semi-finals	Malaysia	1–0	Indonesia	Shah Alam, Malaysia
UTC+08 20:45	Thanabalan 87'	Report		Stadium: Shah Alam Stadium; Referee: Lakmal Weerakkody (Sri Lanka)

29 August Bronze medal match	Indonesia	3–1	Myanmar	Selayang, Malaysia
UTC+08 16:30	Evan 55'; Septian 59'; Rezaldi 77'		Than Paing 22'	Stadium: Selayang Municipal Council Stadium; Referee: Sudish Kumar Pandey (Nepal)

==== Friendlies ====
5 April	Persija Jakarta (Indonesia)	0–0	Indonesia	Bekasi, Indonesia
19:00 UTC+07				Stadium: Patriot Stadium; Attendance: 27.000

25 April	Indonesia	2–1	(Indonesia) Persita Tangerang	Tangerang, Indonesia
08:30 UTC+07	Febri (??); Osvaldo (??)		Aldi (??)	Stadium: SPH Stadium

24 May	Indonesia	1–0	(Indonesia) Persewangi Banyuwangi	Gianyar, Indonesia
	Yabes (??)			Stadium: Kapten I Wayan Dipta Stadium

26 May	Bali United (Indonesia)	1–0	Indonesia	Gianyar, Indonesia
	Comvalius 65'			Stadium: Kapten I Wayan Dipta Stadium

10 July	PS Badung (Indonesia)	1–6	Indonesia	Gianyar, Indonesia
	?? (??)		Marinus (??); Osvaldo (??); Yabes (??); Hamdi (??)	Stadium: Kapten I Wayan Dipta Stadium

16 November	Indonesia	2–3	Syria	Cikarang, Indonesia
TBC UTC+07	Septian 36'; Haay 45'		Naji 31', 43' al-Rahman 53'	Stadium: Wibawa Mukti Stadium

=== Indonesia national under-19 football team ===
==== 2018 AFC U-19 Championship qualification ====
Pos	Team	Pld	W	D	L	GF	GA	GD	Pts	Qualification
1	South Korea (H)	4	4	0	0	22	0	+22	12	Final tournament
2	Malaysia	4	3	0	1	8	5	+3	9	Final tournament
3	Indonesia (Note: Indonesia, as final tournament hosts, automatically qualified regardless of qualification results.)	4	2	0	2	11	8	+3	6	Final tournament
4	Timor-Leste	4	0	1	3	3	14	−11	1	
5	Brunei	4	0	1	3	2	19	−17	1	

Source: AFC
Rules for classification: Qualification tiebreakers
(H) Hosts
Notes:

31 October	Indonesia	5–0	Brunei	Paju, South Korea
15.00 UTC+09	Rafli 12'; Abdul 43' (o.g.); Iqbal 51'; Egy 56'; Saddil 61'	Report		Stadium: Paju National Football Center; Attendance: 212; Referee: Võ Minh Trí (Vietnam)

2 November	Indonesia	5–0	Timor-Leste	Paju, South Korea
12:00 UTC+09	Saddil 51'; Saghara 60'; Egy 84', 88', 90+1'	Report		Stadium: Paju National Football Center; Attendance: 71; Referee: Nivon Robesh Gamini (Sri Lanka)

4 November	South Korea	4–0	Indonesia	Paju, South Korea
15:00 UTC+09	Um Won-sang 9', 61'; Oh Se-hun 58'; Lee Jae-ik 77'	Report		Stadium: Paju National Football Center; Attendance: 6,448; Referee: Võ Minh Trí (Vietnam)

6 November	Malaysia	4–1	Indonesia	Paju, South Korea
12:00 UTC+09	Fayyadh 7' (pen.), 52' (pen.); Rashid 34'; Asokan 47'	Report	Saghara 43'	Stadium: Paju National Football Center; Attendance: 101; Referee: Mooud Bonyadifar (Iran)

==== 2017 AFF U-18 Youth Championship ====
Group B
Pos	Team	Pld	W	D	L	GF	GA	GD	Pts	Qualification
1	Indonesia	4	3	0	1	19	4	+15	9	Knockout stage
2	Myanmar (H)	4	3	0	1	17	3	+14	9	Knockout stage
3	Vietnam	4	3	0	1	17	3	+14	9	
4	Brunei	4	1	0	3	4	25	−21	3	
5	Philippines	4	0	0	4	2	24	−22	0	
6	New Zealand	0	0	0	0	0	0	0	0	Withdrew

Source: AFF
(H) Hosts

5 September Group stage	Indonesia	2–1	Myanmar	Yangon, Myanmar
18:00 UTC+6:30	Egy 72', 90+3'	Report	Myat Kaung Khant 28'	Stadium: Thuwunna Stadium; Attendance: 3,805; Referee: Mohammad Zamzaidi Katimin (Malaysia)

7 September Group stage	Philippines	0–9	Indonesia	Yangon, Myanmar
18:00 UTC+6:30	Kameraad (red card) 90'	Report	Feby 7', 67', 87'; Egy 21', 37' (pen.); Iqbal 25', 39'; Rafli 90+1' (pen.); Resky 90+2'	Stadium: Thuwunna Stadium; Attendance: 300; Referee: Thant Zin Oo (Myanmar)

11 September Group stage	Indonesia	0–3	Vietnam	Yangon, Myanmar
15:00 UTC+3:30		Report	Lê Văn Nam 41', 45'; Bùi Hoàng Anh 86'	Stadium: Thuwunna Stadium; Attendance: 465; Referee: Warintorn Sassadee (Thailand)

13 September Group stage	Brunei	0–8	Indonesia	Yangon, Myanmar
15:00 UTC+3:30			Rafli 1', 42', 45'; Egy 18', 23'; Witan 41', 67'; Saghara 68'	Stadium: Thuwunna Stadium; Referee: Xaypasert Phongsanit (Laos)

15 September Semi-finals	Indonesia	0–0 (2–3 p)	Thailand	Yangon, Myanmar
15:00 UTC+6:30	Ramdani (red card) 45'			Stadium: Thuwunna Stadium; Referee: Clifford Daypuyat (Philippines)
	Penalties
	Egy (penalty scored); Iqbal (penalty missed); Luthfi (penalty scored); Nurhidayat (penalty missed); Marasabessy (penalty missed)		(penalty missed) Kritsada; (penalty scored) Nattawut; (penalty scored) Chokanan; (penalty scored) Teerapat

17 September Third place	Myanmar	1–7	Indonesia	Yangon, Myanmar
15:00 UTC+6:30	Pyae Sone Naing 90+2'	Report	Rafli 14', 59'; Witan 27'; Egy 35', 86'; Saghara 72', 90+3'	Stadium: Thuwunna Stadium; Referee: Xaypasert Phongsanit (Laos)

==== 2017 Toulon Tournament ====
Group C
Pos	Team	Pld	W	D	L	GF	GA	GD	Pts	Qualification
1	Czech Republic	3	2	1	0	5	2	+3	7	Advance to knockout stage
2	Scotland	3	2	0	1	5	4	+1	6	Advance to knockout stage
3	Brazil	3	1	1	1	1	1	0	4	
4	Indonesia	3	0	0	3	1	5	−4	0	

Source: Standings

31 May Group stage	Brazil	1–0	Indonesia	Marseille, France
	Gabriel Novaes 38'			Stadium: Stade d'Honneur Marcel Roustan, Salon-de-Provence; Referee: António Caxala (Angola)

3 June Group stage	Czech Republic	2–0	Indonesia	Marseille, France
	Kašiar 12'; Šašinka 77'			Stadium: Stade Parsemain, Fos-sur-Mer; Referee: Karim Abed (France)

6 June Group stage	Indonesia	1–2	Scotland	Marseille, France
	Saghara Putra 23'		Hardie 32', 63' (pen.)	Stadium: Stade Jules-Ladoumègue, Vitrolles; Referee: Alan Mario Sant (Malta)

==== Friendlies ====
27 April	Patriot (Indonesia)	0–2	Indonesia	Bekasi, Indonesia
19:00 UTC+07			Hanis 19'; Egy 45'	Stadium: Patriot Stadium

17 May	Indonesia	1–1	(Indonesia) Celebest	Gianyar, Indonesia
	Feby Eka Putra 32'		Ari Kiswanto 90+1' (pen.)	Stadium: Kapten I Wayan Dipta Stadium

19 May	Perseden Denpasar (Indonesia)	0–2	Indonesia	Gianyar, Indonesia
			Witan Sulaeman 21'; Feby Eka Putra 79'	Stadium: Kapten I Wayan Dipta Stadium

24 May	Persija Jakarta Reserve (Indonesia)	0–1	Indonesia	Jakarta, Indonesia
			Feby Eka Putra 29'	Stadium: Sutasoma Field

17 June	Persibo Bojonegoro (Indonesia)	1–1	Indonesia	Bojonegoro, Indonesia
	Nugroho Fathur 15'		Saghara Putra 67'	Stadium: Letjen Haji Sudirman Stadium

20 June	DPFF Malang United (Indonesia)	0–5	Indonesia	Malang, Indonesia
			Feby Putra 13'; Jagud Aragani 49', 78', 82'; Firza Andika 63' (pen.)	Stadium: Gajayana Stadium

14 July	Indonesia	2–4	(Spain) Espanyol B	Bandung, Indonesia
				Stadium: Gelora Bandung Lautan Api Stadium; Referee: Thoriq Alkatiri (Indonesia)

4 October	Indonesia	2–0	Cambodia	Bekasi, Indonesia
18:00 UTC+07	Rafli 86'; Egy 89'			Stadium: Patriot Candrabhaga Stadium

8 October	Indonesia	3–0	Thailand	Bekasi, Indonesia
18:00 UTC+07	Witan 43'; Abimanyu 79'; Saddil 87'			Stadium: Wibawa Mukti Stadium; Attendance: 19,000; Referee: Oki Dwi Putra (Indonesia)

21 October	Persid Jember (Indonesia)	0–0	Indonesia	Jember, Indonesia
UTC+07				Stadium: Jember Sport Garden Stadium

== League season ==
=== Liga 1 ===
Locations of the 2017 Liga 1 teams

Pos	Team	Pld	W	D	L	GF	GA	GD	Pts	Qualification or relegation
1	Bhayangkara (C)	34	22	2	10	61	40	+21	68 (Note: Head-to-head results: Bali United 1–3 Bhayangkara; Bhayangkara 3–2 Bali United.)	
2	Bali United	34	21	5	8	76	38	+38	68	Qualification for the AFC Champions League preliminary round 1 (Note: Bhayangkara failed to obtain an AFC license to participate in Asian competitions. As a result, Bali United, the league runners-up, entered the qualifying play-offs.)
3	PSM	34	19	8	7	67	38	+29	65	
4	Persija	34	17	10	7	48	24	+24	61	Qualification for the AFC Cup group stage (Note: PSM failed to obtain an AFC license to participate in Asian competitions. As a result, Persija, the league 4th place, entered the group stage.)
5	Persipura	34	17	9	8	64	37	+27	60	
6	Madura United (Note: Madura United were deducted three points due to FIFA sanction. Madura United would have qualified for the AFC Cup group stage had Bali United qualified for the AFC Champions League group stage. As Bali United failed to qualify for the AFC Champions League group stage, Madura United's qualification in the AFC Cup was annulled.)	34	17	9	8	58	44	+14	57	
7	Barito Putera	34	15	8	11	48	44	+4	53	
8	Borneo	34	15	7	12	50	39	+11	52	
9	Arema	34	13	10	11	43	44	−1	49	
10	Mitra Kukar	34	13	4	17	49	74	−25	43	
11	Sriwijaya	34	11	9	14	50	50	0	42 (Note: Head-to-head results: Sriwijaya 2–1 PS TNI; PS TNI 2–1 Sriwijaya.)	
12	PS TNI	34	12	6	16	46	58	−12	42	
13	Persib	34	9	14	11	39	36	+3	41	
14	Persela	34	12	4	18	49	55	−6	40	
15	Perseru	34	10	7	17	35	45	−10	37	
16	Semen Padang (R)	34	9	8	17	34	51	−17	35	Relegation to Liga 2
17	Persiba (R)	34	7	6	21	41	62	−21	27	Relegation to Liga 2
18	Persegres (Note: Persegres were deducted three points due to FIFA sanction.) (R)	34	2	4	28	26	104	−78	7	Relegation to Liga 2

Source: Go-Jek Traveloka Liga 1, Soccerway
Rules for classification: 1) Points; 2) Head-to-head; 3) Goal Difference; 4) Goals Scored; 5) Drawing.
(C) Champions; (R) Relegated

=== Liga 2 ===
Knockout Round

Semi-finals
25 November – Bandung
PSMS Medan (a.e.t.)	2
PSIS Semarang	0
25 November – Bandung
Persebaya Surabaya	3
Martapura	1

Final
28 November – Bandung
PSMS Medan	2
Persebaya Surabaya (a.e.t.)	3
Third place
28 November – Bandung
PSIS Semarang (a.e.t.)	6
Martapura	4

Final

28 November 2017
(UTC+7:00) 19:00

PSMS Medan	2–3 (a.e.t.)	Persebaya Surabaya
Wirahadi 9' (pen.); Roni 38'	Report	Rishadi 2'; Irfan 41', 92'

Gelora Bandung Lautan Api Stadium, Bandung
Attendance: 13,895
Referee: Hardiyani (Bekasi)

PSMS	Persebaya

GK	20	(Indonesia) Abdul Rohim
CB	12	(Indonesia) Wanda Syahputra
CB	25	(Indonesia) Roni Fatahilah	(yellow card) 31'
RB	16	(Indonesia) Derry Herlangga	(yellow card) 17'	(substituted off) 71'
LB	18	(Indonesia) Fredyan Wahyu
DM	24	(Indonesia) Legimin Raharjo (c)
CM	29	(Indonesia) Suhandi	(yellow card) 86'
AM	7	(Indonesia) Dimas Drajad
RW	21	(Indonesia) Frets Butuan	(yellow card) 81'	(substituted off) 105'
LW	22	(Indonesia) Elthon Maran	(yellow card) 24'	(substituted off) 84'
CF	10	(Indonesia) I Made Wirahadi	(yellow card) 27'
Substitutes:
GK	26	(Indonesia) Ahmad Fauzi
DF	3	(Indonesia) Dani Pratama
DF	69	(Indonesia) Hardiantono
MF	6	(Indonesia) Gusti Sandria	(yellow card) 90+1'	(substituted on) 71'
MF	66	(Indonesia) I Wayan Ekananda
MF	88	(Indonesia) Muhammad Alwi Slamat		(substituted on) 105'
FW	11	(Indonesia) Choirul Hidayat		(substituted on) 84'
Head Coach:
(Indonesia) Djajang Nurdjaman

GK	33	(Indonesia) Miswar Saputra
CB	44	(Indonesia) Andri Muliadi
CB	21	(Indonesia) Fandry Imbiri
RB	22	(Indonesia) Abu Rizal Maulana	(yellow card) 14'
LB	25	(Indonesia) Irvan Febrianto
CM	12	(Indonesia) Rendi Irwan (c)		(substituted off) 101'
CM	96	(Indonesia) Muhammad Hidayat
CM	14	(Indonesia) Adam Maulana
RW	41	(Indonesia) Irfan Jaya		(substituted off) 118'
LW	8	(Indonesia) Oktavianus Fernando
CF	26	(Indonesia) Rishadi Fauzi		(substituted off) 86'
Substitutes:
GK	92	(Indonesia) Dimas Galih Pratama
DF	4	(Indonesia) Mokhamad Syaifuddin
DF	13	(Indonesia) Rachmat Irianto
MF	31	(Indonesia) Kurniawan Karman
MF	7	(Indonesia) Sidik Saimima		(substituted on) 101'
MF	78	(Indonesia) Yogi Novrian		(substituted on) 118'
FW	9	(Indonesia) Ricky Kayame		(substituted on) 86'
Head Coach:
(Argentina) Angel Alfredo Vera

Man of the Match: (Indonesia) Irfan Jaya

Assistant referees:
Ian Asrul Amur
Asep Rohaendi
Fourth official:
Nusur Fadillah (Jakarta)

Match rules

- 90 minutes.
- 30 minutes of extra time if necessary.
- Penalty shoot-out if scores still level.
- Seven named substitutes, of which up to three may be used.

=== Liga 3 ===
Knockout Round

Round of 16
11 December 2017 – Semarang
Kuala Nanggroe	1
Persibo	2
11 December 2017 – Semarang
Aceh United	3
PSDS	2
10 December 2017 – Kendal
Maung Anom	1
Persitangsel	2
11 December 2017 – Kendal
Deltras	1
Persik Kendal	3
10 December 2017 – Kudus
Perse	2
Persilat	0
11 December 2017 – Kudus
PS Bintan	0
PSAD Balikpapan	2
10 December 2017 – Jepara
Persekabpas	0
Blitar United	1
11 December 2017 – Jepara
Persimura (a.e.t.)	2
Sidrap United	1

Quarter-finals
13 December 2017 – Semarang
Persibo	1
Aceh United	2
13 December 2017 – Kendal
Persitangsel	0
Persik Kendal	2
13 December 2017 – Kudus
Perse	0
PSAD Balikpapan	1
13 December 2017 – Jepara
Blitar United	3
Persimura	1

Semi-finals
15 December 2017 – Kendal
Aceh United	1
Persik Kendal	2
15 December 2017 – Jepara
PSAD Balikpapan	0
Blitar United	1

Final
17 December 2017 – Jepara
Persik Kendal	1
Blitar United	2
Third place
17 December 2017 – Jepara
Aceh United	2
PSAD Balikpapan	0

Final

17 December 2017
(UTC+7:00) 18:30

Persik Kendal	1–2	Blitar United
M. Alaik 35'	Report	Guntur 28'; Diego 73'

Gelora Bumi Kartini Stadium, Jepara

== Indonesian clubs in Asia ==
=== AFC Champions League ===
Indonesia did not submit any club entry.

=== AFC Cup ===
Indonesia did not submit any club entry.
