= 2017 Persebaya Surabaya season =

Persebaya Surabaya
2017 season
- President: Azrul Ananda
- Headcoach: Iwan Setiawan (Sacked); Angel Alfredo Vera
- Stadium: Gelora Bung Tomo Stadium, Surabaya
- Liga 2: Champions
- Top goalscorer: Misbakus Solikin (12)
- Highest home attendance: 46,359 vs. Semeru F.C.
- Biggest win: 5-0 vs. PSBS Biak Numfor
- Biggest defeat: 2-1 vs. Martapura FC

2017 Liga 2 (Indonesia) became Persebaya 1927's first official competition after being re-recognized by PSSI. The Annual Congress of the Indonesian Football Association (PSSI) restored the status of Persebaya 1927 as members of the national federation. Persebaya 1927 returning to using the name Persebaya Surabaya after winning the Trademark and Logo dispute against Persebaya Surabaya DU. In the 2017 season, Persebaya won the championship after defeating PSMS Medan in the Final round at Gelora Bandung Lautan Api Stadium.

== Players ==
The following are the names of Persebaya players in 2017. Data by March 19, 2017.

| Pos. | Name | Nat. |
|---|---|---|
| GK | Dimas Galih Pratama | (Indonesia) |
| GK | Miswar Saputra | (Indonesia) |
| GK | Samuel Reimas | (Indonesia) |
| DF | Mat Halil | (Indonesia) |
| DF | M. Syaifuddin | (Indonesia) |
| DF | Rachmat Irianto | (Indonesia) |
| DF | Rachmat Latief | (Indonesia) |
| DF | Andri Muliadi | (Indonesia) |
| DF | Abdul Azis | (Indonesia) |
| DF | Rahmad Juliandri | (Indonesia) |
| DF | Moch. Irvan | (Indonesia) |
| MF | Abu Rizal Maulana | (Indonesia) |
| MF | Ridwan Awaludin | (Indonesia) |
| MF | Misbakus Solikin | (Indonesia) |
| MF | Sidik Saimima | (Indonesia) |
| MF | Oktafianus Fernando | (Indonesia) |
| MF | Rendi Irwan | (Indonesia) |
| MF | Siswanto | (Indonesia) |
| MF | Thaufan Hidayat | (Indonesia) |
| CF | Rachmat Afandi | (Indonesia) |
| CF | Irfan Jaya | (Indonesia) |

== Match Results ==
There were several competitions that Persebaya Surabaya participated in 2017.

=== Dirgantara Cup 2017 ===
This tournament is a pre-season event held to commemorate the 2017 Aerospace Month and is supported by the Indonesian Air Force Adisutjipto Air Force Base.

==== Group stage ====
| 28 Februari 2017 1 | Persebaya | 4-2 | PSN Ngada | Sleman |
| 15.30 WIB. (Grup B) | Thaufan Hidayat 20'; Rachmat Afandi 40'; Fani Aulia 53'; Irfan Jaya 58' | Report | Yohanes K. Nono 3'; Yohanes K. Nono 70' (pen.) | Stadium: Maguwoharjo |

| 2 Maret 2017 2 | Persebaya | 1-0 | Persbul Buol | Sleman |
| 15.30 WIB. (Grup B) | Rachmat Affandi 66' | Report | | Stadium: Maguwoharjo |

| 4 Maret 2017 2 | Persebaya | 1-2 | Cilegon United | Sleman |
| 15.30 WIB. (Grup B) | Irfan Jaya 1' | Report | Jalwandi 12'; Jalwandi 24' (pen.) | Stadium: Maguwoharjo |

==== Semifinal ====
| 6 Maret 2017 | Persebaya | 3-0 | Persibo Bojonegoro | Sleman |
| 18.30 WIB | Rachmat Affandi 23'; Rachmat Afandi 44'; Oktavianus Fernando 80' | Report | | Stadium: Maguwoharjo |

==== Final ====
| 8 Maret 2017 | Persebaya | 2-0 | Cilegon United | Sleman |
| 19.00 WIB | M. Syaifuddin 34'; Oktavianus Fernando 40' | Report | | Stadium: Maguwoharjo |

=== Liga 2 ===
==== Group stage ====
Group 5

| Pos | Team | Pld | W | D | L | GF | GA | GD | Pts | Qualification or relegation | PSBY | MTPR | PSIM | PPAM | PSTU | PNGA | MDPT | PSBI |
|---|---|---|---|---|---|---|---|---|---|---|---|---|---|---|---|---|---|---|
| 1 | Persebaya | 14 | 8 | 5 | 1 | 27 | 11 | +16 | 29 | Advance to second round | — | 2–0 | 2–1 | 3–1 | 2–0 | 4–0 | 1–1 | 4–0 |
| 2 | Martapura | 14 | 9 | 1 | 4 | 35 | 22 | +13 | 28 | Advance to second round | 2–1 | — | 3–1 | 4–1 | 4–3 | 4–1 | 4–0 | 2–0 |
| 3 | PSIM | 14 | 6 | 3 | 5 | 21 | 18 | +3 | 21 | Qualification to relegation play-off | 1–1 | 3–2 | — | 1–0 | 3–1 | 2–0 | 2–1 | 3–0 |
| 4 | Persepam | 14 | 5 | 3 | 6 | 25 | 23 | +2 | 18 (Note: Tied on head-to-head results. Overall goal difference was used as the tiebreaker.) | Qualification to relegation play-off | 2–2 | 4–2 | 1–1 | — | 2–1 | 5–2 | 0–0 | 4–1 |
| 5 | Persatu (R) | 14 | 5 | 3 | 6 | 21 | 20 | +1 | 18 | Relegation to Liga 3 | 0–0 | 1–1 | 1–0 | 2–1 | — | 3–0 | 4–2 | 3–1 |

Source: Liga 2
Legend: Blue = home team win; Yellow = draw; Red = away team win.
Rules for classification: 1) Points; 2) Head-to-head; 3) Goal difference; 4) Goals scored.
(R) Relegated

==== Second round ====
Group C

| Pos | Team | Pld | W | D | L | GF | GA | GD | Pts | Qualification | KTPR | PSBY | SMRU | PSBS |
|---|---|---|---|---|---|---|---|---|---|---|---|---|---|---|
| 1 | Kalteng Putra | 6 | 3 | 2 | 1 | 10 | 4 | +6 | 11 | Advance to third round | — | 1–1 | 1–1 | 4–1 |
| 2 | Persebaya | 6 | 2 | 3 | 1 | 10 | 2 | +8 | 9 (Note: Persebaya 4 Pts; Persigo Semeru 1 Pt.) | Advance to third round | 0–1 | — | 4–0 | 5–0 |
| 3 | Persigo Semeru | 6 | 2 | 3 | 1 | 3 | 5 | −2 | 9 | | 1–0 | 0–0 | — | 1–0 |
| 4 | PSBS | 6 | 0 | 2 | 4 | 1 | 13 | −12 | 2 | | 0–3 | 0–0 | 0–0 | — |

Source: Liga 2
Legend: Blue = home team win; Yellow = draw; Red = away team win.
Rules for classification: 1) Points; 2) Head-to-head; 3) Goal difference; 4) Goals scored.

==== Third round ====
Group Y

| Pos | Team | Pld | W | D | L | GF | GA | GD | Pts | Qualification |
|---|---|---|---|---|---|---|---|---|---|---|
| 1 | Persebaya (C, P) | 3 | 3 | 0 | 0 | 6 | 0 | +6 | 9 | Advance to semifinals |
| 2 | PSIS (P) | 3 | 1 | 1 | 1 | 4 | 2 | +2 | 4 (Note: Tied on head-to-head result (PSIS 1–1 PSPS Riau). Overall goal difference was used as the tiebreaker.) | Advance to semifinals |
| 3 | PSPS Riau | 3 | 1 | 1 | 1 | 4 | 3 | +1 | 4 | |
| 4 | PSMP | 3 | 0 | 0 | 3 | 1 | 10 | −9 | 0 | |

Source: Liga 2
(C) Champions; (P) Promoted

==== Knockout Stage ====
Semifinal

25 November 2017
15.00 UTC+7

| Persebaya | 3–1 | Martapura |
|---|---|---|
| Irfan 25' (pen.), 38'; Rishadi 58' | Report | Reza 56' |

Gelora Bandung Lautan Api Stadium, Bandung
Referee: Dodi Setia Purnama

Final

28 November 2017
19.00 UTC+7

| PSMS | 2–3 (a.e.t.) | Persebaya |
|---|---|---|
| Wirahadi 9' (pen.); Roni 38' | Report | Rishadi 2'; Irfan 41', 92' |

Gelora Bandung Lautan Api Stadium, Bandung
Attendance: 13,895
Referee: Hadiyani (Bekasi)
