= Wanggai =

Wanggai is a Papuan surname. Notable people with the surname include:

- Imanuel Wanggai (born 1988), Indonesian professional footballer
- Izaac Wanggai (born 1982), Indonesian professional footballer
- Patrich Wanggai (born 1988), Indonesian professional footballer
