= Arthur Irawan =

Indonesian footballer (born 1993)

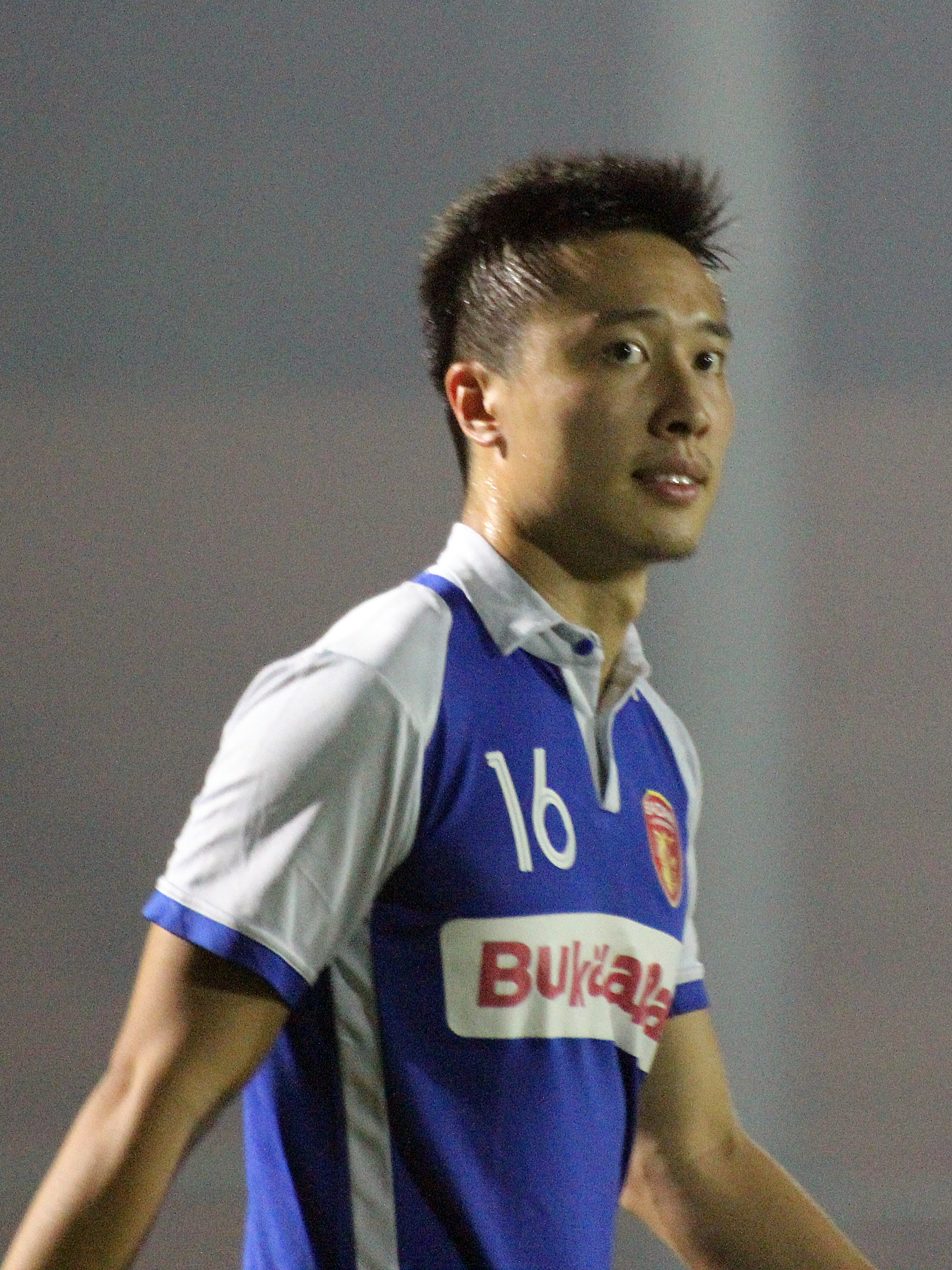
- Arthur training with Badak Lampung in 2019

Personal information
- Full name: Arthur Daniel Irawan
- Date of birth: 3 March 1993 (age 33)
- Place of birth: Surabaya, Indonesia
- Height: 1.76 m (5 ft 9 in)
- Positions: Defensive midfielder; right-back

Youth career
- 2010–2011: Lytham Town
- 2011–2012: Espanyol

Senior career*
Years	Team	Apps	(Gls)
2012–2013	Espanyol B	8	(0)
2013–2014	Málaga B	6	(0)
2014–2016	Waasland-Beveren	4	(0)
2017	Persija Jakarta	2	(0)
2017	→ Borneo (loan)	4	(0)
2018	Persebaya Surabaya	6	(0)
2019–2020	Badak Lampung	8	(0)
2020–2021	PSS Sleman	10	(0)
2021–2024	Persik Kediri	40	(2)
Total		88	(2)

International career
2012	Indonesia	4	(0)
- * Club domestic league appearances and goals

Arthur Daniel Irawan (born 3 March 1993) is an Indonesian former footballer who last played as a defensive midfielder or right-back for Persik Kediri.

== Early career ==
Arthur started playing football in Jakarta since he was seven years old. He played for Jakarta Intercultural School's varsity soccer team. Spanish club Espanyol became interested in him when he was playing in a 2011 game in England. The Catalonia-based club offered a two-month trial. After impressing in the trial period, Espanyol gave him a four-year contract and an opportunity to train at its youth academy.

== Club career ==
=== RCD Espanyol B ===
On 9 November 2011, Irawan officially signed for Espanyol B, which plays in Segunda B, the third-tier of Spanish football. He struggled to earn playtime with eight appearances in three years.

=== Málaga B ===
In January 2014, Irawan decided to move to a lower league and sign for Málaga B that plays in the Tercera Division, the fourth-tier of Spanish football, after three years playing for Espanyol B in Segunda B.

=== Waasland-Beveren ===
In the summer of 2014, Irawan joined Belgian first division side Waasland-Beveren. Arthur Irawan finally made his Belgian Pro League debut in their final match of the season. In this game, Waasland lost 1–2 in a home match against KV Mechelen. Injuries prevented him to find another opportunity to play for this club.

=== Persija Jakarta ===
After five years unable to break into the first-team in Europe, Irawan in 2017 returned home to Indonesia and joined Liga 1 (Indonesia) giant Persija Jakarta on a one-year contract. He made his 2017 Liga 1 debut in a match against Bhayangkara F.C that ended with his team winning 1–0. However, like in Europe, he struggled to secure a starting position.

=== Borneo ===
On 18 August 2017, Persija loaned Irawan to Borneo F.C until the end of the season. Irawan made his club debut in a 4–2 win against Persela Lamongan on 19 October 2017 as a substitute for Sultan Samma in the 79th minute. He only played a game for this Samarinda-based club.

=== Persebaya Surabaya ===
Unable to impress Persija, Irawan in 2018 signed with Liga 1 club Persebaya Surabaya. He has been given jersey number 12. He only made one appearance with the club, he made his debut in a 1–1 draw against Persela Lamongan on 30 March 2018.

=== Badak Lampung ===
Like in Europe, he opted to move to a weaker team for the sake of playing time. He joined Badak Lampung, a club that was newly promoted from Liga 2 to play in the 2019 Liga 1 season. Irawan made his first league debut for Badak Lampung as a substitute for Kurniawan Karman in the 78th minute in the Liga 1 in a 0–3 away loss against Bali United on 30 June 2019.

=== PSS Sleman ===
Insisting to stay in top-flight football in Indonesia, Irawan moved to PSS Sleman that won promotion from Liga 2 together with Badak Lampung in 2018 but, unlike the latter, managed to finish in the middle of the table in its inaugural Liga 1 season in 2019.

He made his league debut in a 2–1 away loss against PSM Makassar on 1 March 2020. Finally finding a place where he can shine, Irawan played in all of the club's three matches in the 2020 Liga 1 season that abruptly stopped due to the COVID-19 pandemic.

==== 2021–22 season ====
On 27 August 2021, 2021–22 Liga 1 officially started, he started his first career in this season by made his debut in a 1–1 draw against Persija Jakarta on 5 September 2021.

=== Persik Kediri ===
On 23 November 2021, Irawan signed for Persik Kediri. He was signed for the remainder of the 2021-22 Liga 1 season. Irawan is also the founder of the start-up game development company PT Astar Asia Global, which is the majority shareholder of Persik Kediri.

Irawan made his league debut on 8 January 2022 in a match against Borneo at the Kapten I Wayan Dipta Stadium, Gianyar. On 25 July, he captained his team for the first time, in a league match against Persita Tangerang.

On 30 March 2023, Irawan scored his first goal for the club, scoring in a 1–3 away win over Dewa United at the Indomilk Arena.

== International career ==
Irawan was first called to play for Indonesia for the preparation of the AFF Suzuki Cup 2012, which was held in Malaysia. He played against the Timor Leste national football team at Gelora Bung Karno Stadium which ended with 1–0 win for Indonesia.

== Honours ==
=== Club ===
PSS Sleman

- Menpora Cup third place: 2021
