= Raphael Maitimo =

Indonesian footballer

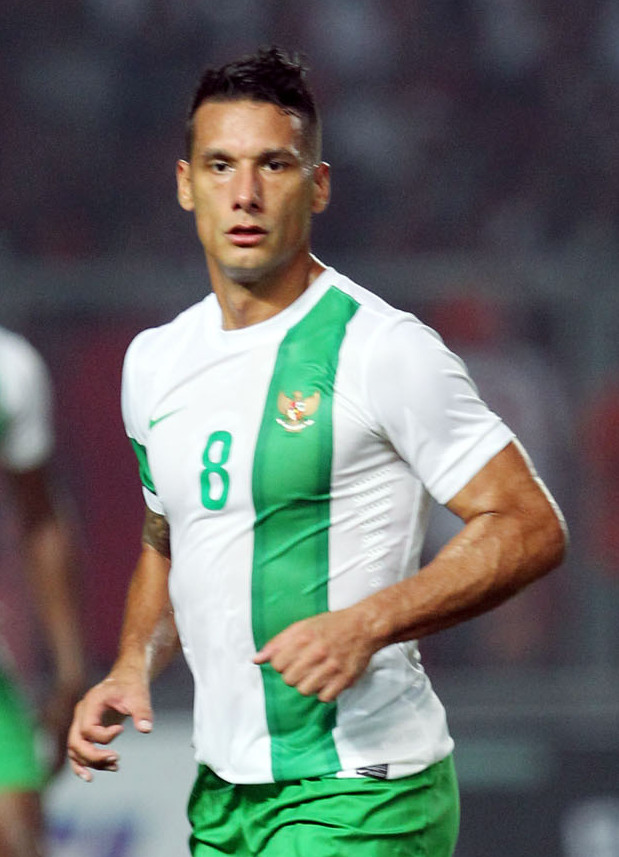
- Maitimo playing for Indonesia against his birth country the Netherlands in 2013

Personal information
- Full name: Raphael Guillermo Eduardo Maitimo
- Date of birth: 17 March 1984 (age 42)
- Place of birth: Rotterdam, Netherlands
- Height: 1.80 m (5 ft 11 in)
- Positions: Midfielder; forward

Youth career
- 1990–1992: VV Nieuwerkerk
- 1992–2003: Feyenoord

Senior career*
Years	Team	Apps	(Gls)
2004–2005	FC Dordrecht	19	(2)
2005–2008	SC Feyenoord	45	(18)
2009–2010	Beijing BIT	41	(4)
2011–2012	Bali Devata	16	(3)
2012	Capelle	1	(0)
2013–2015	Mitra Kukar	35	(2)
2015	Sriwijaya	3	(1)
2015	Persija Jakarta	7	(3)
2016	Arema Cronus	30	(2)
2017–2018	Persib Bandung	28	(9)
2018–2019	Madura United	10	(3)
2018	→ Persebaya Surabaya (loan)	2	(0)
2019	PSIM Yogyakarta	7	(2)
2019	PSM Makassar	18	(1)
2020–2021	Persita Tangerang	11	(1)
2022	Barito Putera	17	(0)
Total		290	(51)

International career
1997–1998	Netherlands U15		
1998–1999	Netherlands U16		
1999–2000	Netherlands U17	6	(1)
2012–2015	Indonesia	21	(4)

Managerial career
- 2023: Canada U17 (manager)
- * Club domestic league appearances and goals

Raphael Guillermo Eduardo Maitimo (born 17 March 1984) is a football coach and former player. Born in the Netherlands, he represented the Netherlands and later the Indonesia at international level. He most recently served as manager of the Canada men's national under-17 team.

== Club career ==
=== Early career ===
Maitimo started his football career at the age of 6 years old, for club VV Nieuwerkerk in the Netherlands. Already after two years, Maitimo was scouted by several professional Dutch clubs, one being Feyenoord where he took the first steps of his professional career. Maitimo spent his whole youth career at Feyenoord Academy. In Feyenoord youth, Maitimo played together with Robin van Persie. In the Dutch youth national teams Maitimo played alongside Wesley Sneijder and Arjen Robben

Although having professional sporting commitments Maitimo also finished his bachelor's degree in Economics of Commerce with Sports Marketing & Management as his minor. Maitimo followed a special program for professional athletes, at the Rotterdam University of Applied Sciences, to complete his Bachelor of Economics.

=== FC Dordrecht ===
In January 2005, he made his debut at a senior level with club FC Dordrecht in the Eerste Divisie which is the second-highest division of football in the Netherlands.

=== Beijing BIT ===
In January 2011, Maitimo continued his professional senior career in the China League One with club Beijing BIT for two seasons. Maitimo played as a holding midfielder and scored 6 goals.

=== Bali Devata and VV Capelle ===
He made his next move to Indonesia. In 2011 Maitimo signed with Liga Primer Indonesia club Bali Devata and scored 3 goals. Unfortunately, the league stopped after 6 Months, because of domestic political problems. In 2012 Maitimo played for VV Capelle in Topklasse to stay fit and after 1 Month he returned back to Indonesia.

=== Mitra Kukar ===
In May 2013 Maitimo signed for Mitra Kukar in the Indonesian Super League. He made his debut on 17 May 2013 in a match against Pelita Jaya. On 15 September 2013, Maitimo scored his first goal for Mitra Kukar against PSPS Pekanbaru in the 58th minute at the Aji Imbut Stadium, Tenggarong. He played 35 matches and scored 2 goals in 2013 season for Mitra Kukar. He also scored 3 goals in 6 matches playing in 2014 Inter Island Cup.

=== Sriwijaya FC ===
In January 2015, he signed with Sriwijaya. Maitimo made his debut on 4 April 2015 in a match against Pelita Bandung Raya. On 7 April 2015, Maitimo scored his first goal for Sriwijaya against Semen Padang in the 35th minute at the Gelora Sriwijaya Stadium, Palembang. After three matches the Indonesian league got banned by FIFA because of a force majeur.

=== Arema Cronus ===
He was signed for Arema Cronus to play in Indonesia Soccer Championship A in the 2016 season. He made 30 appearances and played mostly as a holding midfielder. Maitimo scored 2 goals for Arema Cronus in the competition and 2 goals in the Bayangkara Cup. With 9 assists during the season Maitimo became the top assist player of the season Arema Cronus became runner-up in the league and champions of the Bayangkara Cup.

=== Persib Bandung ===
In 2017, Raphael Maitimo signed a one-year contract with Indonesian Liga 1 club Persib Bandung. He made his debut on 29 April 2017 in a match against Sriwijaya. On 11 June 2017, Maitimo scored his first goal for Persib against Persiba Balikpapan in the 88th minute at the Gelora Bandung Lautan Api Stadium, Bandung. He made 28 league appearances and scored 9 goals in the league for Persib Bandung and 3 goals in pre-season friendly matches. Besides becoming top scorer of the team Maitimo also became the player with the most assists of the season.

=== Madura United ===
He was signed for Madura United to play in Liga 1 in the 2018 season and became the highest-paid player of the league. Maitimo made his debut on 26 March 2018 in a match against Barito Putera. On 26 March 2018, Maitimo scored his first goal for Madura United in the 11th minute at the Gelora Ratu Pamelingan Stadium, Pamekasan. He made 10 league appearances and scored 6 goals including pre-season tournament matches for Madura United.

=== Loan to Persebaya Surabaya ===
In July 2018, Maitimo join Liga 1 club Persebaya on loan for the rest 2018 season. Towards the end of the first half of Liga 1 season 2018, Persebaya Surabaya gets new ammunition to meet the second half. Raphael Maitimo joined the club with the name Bajul Ijo. His debut came on 18 July as a substitute when he replaced Feri Pahabol. The match ended 2–0 to Persebaya as a home victory. Because of a complicated injury, Maitimo only played 2 matches for Persebaya and wasn't able to play for the rest of the season.

=== PSIM Yogyakarta ===
He was signed for PSIM Yogyakarta to play in Liga 2 in the 2019 season. He made 7 league appearances and scored 2 goals for PSIM Yogyakarta.

=== PSM Makassar ===
In the middle of the 2019 season, Maitimo signed a year contract with Liga 1 club PSM Makassar. He made his debut on 27 September 2019 in a match against Persipura Jayapura. On 22 December 2019, Maitimo scored his first goal for PSM against Persib Bandung in the 73rd minute at the Si Jalak Harupat Stadium, Soreang.

=== Persita Tangerang ===
Maitimo signed a year contract with Persita Tangerang in 2020. and made his debut in the 2020 Liga 1. Maitimo scored his debut in the 2020 Liga 1 against TIRA-Persikabo. This season was suspended on 27 March 2020 due to the COVID-19 pandemic. The season was abandoned and was declared void on 20 January 2021.

=== Barito Putera ===
In January 2022, Maitimo signed a contract with Liga 1 club Barito Putera. He made his league debut in a 3–0 lost against Bali United on 9 January at the Ngurah Rai Stadium, Denpasar.

== International career ==
In his early career he played alongside Wesley Sneijder and Arjen Robben in the Netherlands U15, Netherlands U16 and Netherlands U17.

In October 2010 Maitimo was invited by the Football Association of Indonesia to become a part of Indonesia national team. After a long process with finalizing documents, Maitimo finally made his international debut for the Indonesia national team on 25 November 2012 in the 2012 AFF Suzuki Cup against Laos. He also scored his first international goal in the match as a 1–1 equalizer with a looping header. The game ended in a 2–2 draw. On 26 March 2014 Maitimo scored winning goal in the match between Andorra and Indonesia, held in Spain. The match ended in a 1–0 win for Indonesia national team which was their first win in Europe in their history. During 2015 AFC Asian Cup qualification Indonesia changed five coaches, and Maitimo was the only player in the squad invited by all five of them.

A highlight in his international career was the friendly match at the Gelora Bung Karno Stadium in Jakarta on 7 June 2013 against the Netherlands. In this match Maitimo met his former teammates Robin van Persie, Wesley Sneijder and Arjen Robben.

== Career statistics ==
=== International ===
Indonesia national team
Year	Apps	Goals
2012	3	1
2013	7	0
2014	9	2
2015	2	1
Total	21	4

=== International goals ===
Score and Result list Indonesia'a goal tally first

No.	Date	Venue	Opponent	Score	Result	Competition	Ref.
1.	25 November 2012	Bukit Jalil National Stadium, Bukit Jalil, Malaysia	Laos	1–1	2–2	2012 AFF Championship	
2.	26 March 2014	Estadio Luis Suñer Picó, Alzira, Spain	Andorra	1–0	1–0	Friendly	
3.	25 September 2014	Gelora Delta Stadium, Sidoarjo, Indonesia	Cambodia	1–0	1–0	Friendly	
4.	30 March 2015	Gelora Delta Stadium, Sidoarjo, Indonesia	Myanmar	1–0	2–1	Friendly	

== See also ==
- List of Indonesia international footballers born outside Indonesia
