= David da Silva =

Brazilian footballer (born 1989)

Personal information
- Full name: David Aparecido da Silva
- Date of birth: 12 November 1989 (age 36)
- Place of birth: Guarulhos, Brazil
- Height: 1.85 m (6 ft 1 in)
- Position: Striker

Team information
- Current team: Java United
- Number: 17

Senior career*
Years	Team	Apps	(Gls)
2010–2011	Birkirkara	6	(0)
2011–2012	Shelbourne	2	(0)
2013	Catanduvense	2	(0)
2014	Khor Fakkan		
2014–2016	Al-Mussanah	25	(10)
2016–2017	Al-Orobah	21	(9)
2016	→ Zweigen Kanazawa (loan)	8	(1)
2017	→ Qadsia (loan)	20	(14)
2017–2018	Al-Khor	15	(7)
2018	Persebaya Surabaya	23	(20)
2019	Pohang Steelers	9	(2)
2019–2020	Persebaya Surabaya	19	(15)
2021	Terengganu	15	(9)
2021–2025	Persib Bandung	103	(69)
2025–	Java United	36	(25)
- * Club domestic league appearances and goals as of 19 September 2026

David Aparecido da Silva (born 12 November 1989) is a Brazilian professional footballer who plays as a striker for Super League club Java United.

== Career ==
=== Shelbourne ===
On 11 August 2011, Da Silva signed a contract with League of Ireland club Shelbourne. He made his League of Ireland debut on 13 August 2011 as he came on as a substitute in the 86th minute for Philip Hughes in a 3–1 win over Longford Town. He played his first home game for Drumcondra-based club at the Tolka Park on 3 October 2011 in a 4–3 win over Limerick in the quarter-finals of the 2011 FAI Cup. He came on as a substitute in the 89th minute for Hughes in a 1–1 draw against St Patrick's Athletic in the semi-finals.

=== Persebaya Surabaya ===
In 2018, Da Silva was signed for Persebaya Surabaya to play in Indonesia President's Cup and Liga 1 in the 2018 season, Da Silva made his Persebaya debut in a pre-season 2018 Indonesia President's Cup against Madura United on 28 January 2018 On 30 March 2018, Da Silva made his league debut as a substitute by Rishadi Fauzi in a 1–1 draw against Persela Lamongan. And he also scored his first goal for the team, he scored in the 70th minute at Surajaya Stadium. On 13 April, Da Silva scored his first Persebaya hat-trick in a 1–4 away win against TIRA-Persikabo at Sultan Agung Stadium. On 5 August, Da Silva scored a brace in Persebaya's 3–1 home win against Persela Lamongan. On 22 September, Da Silva scored a hat-trick in a 4–1 victory at PS Mitra Kukar, become a player with second hat-trick for the club at the season, he also scored his third hat-trick for the club in a 2–5 away win against Bali United on 18 November.

While he had a good season in his first year in Indonesia with 23 league appearances and scored 20 goals from a total of 60 goals with Persebaya in 2018 Liga 1, Da Silva decided to South Korea at the end of the contract year.

=== Pohang Steelers ===
On 9 January 2019, Da Silva signed a one-year contract with K League 1 club Pohang Steelers. He made his league debut for Pohang Steelers when he was part of the starting lineup of a 2019 K League 1 match against FC Seoul on 3 March 2019 at Seoul World Cup Stadium. On 10 March, Da Silva scored his first league goal for Pohang Steelers in a 1–2 away lose over Gimcheon Sangmu at Pohang Steel Yard.

== Honours ==
Persebaya Surabaya

- East Java Governor Cup: 2020

Persib Bandung

- Liga 1: 2023–24, 2024–25

Individual

- Kuwaiti Premier League Top Goalscorer: 2016–17
- Liga 1/Super League Team of the Season: 2018, 2022–23, 2023–24, 2025–26
- Liga 1 Best Goal: 2019
- Liga 1/Super League Top Goalscorer: 2023–24, 2025–26
- Liga 1 Player of the Month: December 2022, January 2023, October 2023, April 2024
- APPI Indonesian Football Award Best 11: 2022–2023, 2023–2024,2025–2026
- APPI Indonesian Football Award Best Forward: 2022–2023, 2023–2024,2025–2026
