= Izmy Hatuwe =

Indonesian footballer

Personal information
- Full name: Izmy Ratmadja Yaman Hatuwe
- Date of birth: 25 June 1996 (age 30)
- Place of birth: Central Maluku, Indonesia
- Height: 1.70 m (5 ft 7 in)
- Positions: Midfielder; left-back

Senior career*
Years	Team	Apps	(Gls)
2017–2022	Persikabo 1973	30	(0)
2019	→ Persela Lamongan (loan)	15	(0)
2022	→ PSIM Yogyakarta (loan)	5	(0)
2023–2024	Malut United	2	(0)
2024–2025	PSMS Medan	20	(0)
2025–2026	Sumsel United	3	(0)
- * Club domestic league appearances and goals as of 22:45, 28 September 2025 (UTC)

Izmy Ratmadja Yaman Hatuwe (born 25 June 1996) is an Indonesian professional footballer who plays as a midfielder or left-back.

== Club career ==
=== PS TNI ===
He was signed for PS TNI to play in Liga 1 in the 2017 season. Izmy made his league debut on 14 October 2017 in a match against Arema at the Kanjuruhan Stadium, Malang.

==== Persela Lamongan (loan) ====
He was signed for Persela Lamongan to play in the Liga 1 in the 2019 season, on loan from TIRA-Persikabo. Izmy made his league debut on 11 September 2019 in a match against Badak Lampung at the Patriot Candrabaga Stadium, Bekasi.

== Honours ==
Malut United

- Liga 2 third place (play-offs): 2023–24
