= Elisa Basna =

Indonesian association football player

Personal information
- Full name: Elisa Yahya Basna
- Date of birth: 4 February 1996 (age 30)
- Place of birth: Sorong, Indonesia
- Height: 1.68 m (5 ft 6 in)
- Positions: Attacking midfielder; winger

Team information
- Current team: Persipura Jayapura
- Number: 20

Senior career*
Years	Team	Apps	(Gls)
2016–2018	Persipura Jayapura	22	(1)
2018–2020	Persebaya Surabaya	9	(0)
2020–2021	Persita Tangerang	3	(0)
2021–2022	Persipura Jayapura	28	(2)
2022–2023	Persita Tangerang	21	(2)
2023–	Persipura Jayapura	53	(4)
- * Club domestic league appearances and goals as of 26 September 2026

Elisa Yahya Basna (born 4 February 1996), is an Indonesian professional footballer who plays as an attacking midfielder or winger for Liga 2 clubs Persipura Jayapura.

== Club career ==
=== Persipura Jayapura ===
In 2017, Basna signed a two-years contract with Indonesian Liga club Persipura Jayapura. He made his professional debut on 23 April 2017 in a match against Bali United. On 20 October 2018, Basna scored his first goal for Persipura in the 87th minute against Madura United at the Gelora Ratu Pamelingan Stadium, Pamekasan.

=== Persebaya Surabaya ===
In 2019, Basna signed a year contract with Liga 1 club Persebaya Surabaya. He made his league debut on 16 May 2019 in a match against Bali United at the Kapten I Wayan Dipta Stadium, Gianyar.

=== Persita Tangerang ===
He was signed for Persita Tangerang to play in Liga 1 in the 2020 season. Basna made his league debut on 1 March 2020 in a match against Bali United at the Kapten I Wayan Dipta Stadium, Gianyar. This season was suspended on 27 March 2020 due to the COVID-19 pandemic. The season was abandoned and was declared void on 20 January 2021.

=== Return to Persipura Jayapura ===
In 2021, Basna signed a year contract with Liga 1 club Persipura Jayapura. He made his league debut on 10 September 2021 in a match against Persela Lamongan at the Wibawa Mukti Stadium, Cibinong.

=== Return to Persita Tangerang ===
Basna was signed for Persita Tangerang to play in Liga 1 in the 2022–23 season. He made his league debut on 25 July 2022 in a match against Persik Kediri at the Indomilk Arena, Tangerang.

== Personal life ==
Basna's brother, Yanto Basna is also a football player.

== Honours ==
=== Club ===
Persebaya Surabaya

- Liga 1 runner-up: 2019
- Indonesia President's Cup runner-up: 2019
