= Abdul Rohim =

Indonesian footballer

Personal information
- Full name: Abdul Rohim
- Date of birth: 6 April 1992 (age 34)
- Place of birth: North Labuhan Batu, Indonesia
- Height: 1.75 m (5 ft 9 in)
- Position: Goalkeeper

Team information
- Current team: Deltras
- Number: 33

Senior career*
Years	Team	Apps	(Gls)
2015	PS Bintang Jaya Asahan	0	(0)
2016–2018	PSMS Medan	47	(0)
2019	Persebaya Surabaya	2	(0)
2020–2021	PSMS Medan	8	(0)
2022	Persela Lamongan	9	(0)
2022–2025	PSMS Medan	20	(0)
2025–2026	Bekasi City	0	(0)
2026–	Deltras	0	(0)
- * Club domestic league appearances and goals as of 15 February 2025

Abdul Rohim (born 6 April 1992) is an Indonesian professional footballer who plays as a goalkeeper for Championship club Deltras.

== Club career ==
He started playing with PSMS as a goalkeeper in 2017 played in Liga 2. In the season he managed with his club to be promotional team to 2018 Liga 1 as runner-up after beaten Persebaya with a score of 3–2.

The name Abdul Rohim drew public attention after successfully dismissed 3 penalties in the 2018 Piala Presiden match against Persebaya which ended in winning on penalties 7–6.

In the third round of 2018 Liga 1 against Persija Jakarta he injured a posterior cruciate ligament (PCL) injury and had to rest for a while.

== Honours ==
=== Club ===
PSMS Medan

- Liga 2 runner-up: 2017
- Indonesia President's Cup 4th place: 2018

Persebaya Surabaya

- Liga 1 runner-up: 2019
- Indonesia President's Cup runner-up: 2019
