= Septian David Maulana =

Indonesian footballer (born 1996)

Septian David
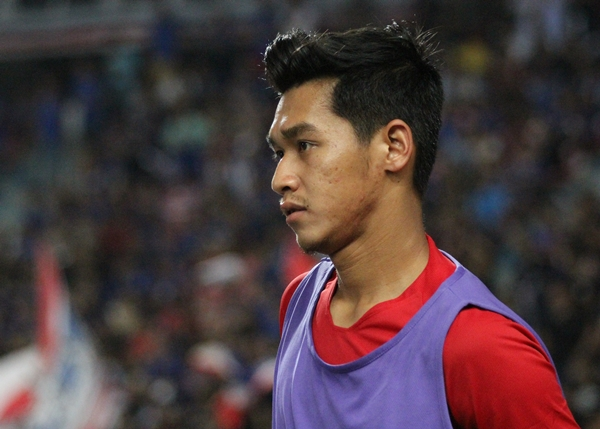
- David with Indonesia at the 2018 AFF Championship

Personal information
- Full name: Septian David Maulana
- Date of birth: 2 September 1996 (age 30)
- Place of birth: Semarang, Indonesia
- Height: 1.74 m (5 ft 9 in)
- Position: Attacking midfielder

Team information
- Current team: Garudayaksa
- Number: 29

Youth career
- –2012: SSB Bhaladika
- 2012–2014: Deportivo Indonesia

Senior career*
Years	Team	Apps	(Gls)
2015–2019	Mitra Kukar	71	(16)
2019–2025	PSIS Semarang	135	(20)
2025–2026	Malut United	13	(2)
2026–	Garudayaksa	1	(1)

International career
2013–2014	Indonesia U19	10	(3)
2017–2018	Indonesia U23	15	(7)
2016–2019	Indonesia	12	(1)
Medal record
Men's football
Representing Indonesia
Southeast Asian Games
Bronze medal – third place	2017 Kuala Lumpur	Team
- * Club domestic league appearances and goals as of 6 September 2026

Septian David Maulana (born 2 September 1996) is an Indonesian professional footballer who plays as an attacking midfielder for Super League club Garudayaksa.

== Club career ==
=== PS Mitra Kukar ===
In December 2014, Septian signed a contract with Mitra Kukar. He made his debut on 5 April 2015 after replacing Jajang Mulyana in the 73rd minute, which ended 1–0 defeat against Persebaya Surabaya at Gelora Bung Tomo Stadium. In next match, he scored his first goal in the 35th minute against Gresik United. In 2015 season, he only played 2 times and scored one goal.

==== 2016 season ====
On 14 May 2016, he scored his first goal of the 2016 season, scoring in a 1–4 away win over PS TNI at the Siliwangi Stadium. On 10 June, he scored equalizer in a 3–2 home win over rival Pusamania Borneo. In 2016 season, he had a good season in his first club with 29 appearances and scored five goals.

==== 2017 season ====
Septian scored his first goal of the new season on 15 April 2017, opening the scoring from header in a 2–1 lose with South Kalimantan club Barito Putera. On 28 April, he give assists an equalizer goal by Marclei Santos in Mitra Kukar's 2–2 draw over Madura United. On 3 May, Septian scored his second league goal of the season, scoring in the 55th minute and give another assists to Anindito Wahyu in Mitra Kukar's 3–2 home win over Persela Lamongan.

On 15 June, he assisted a further two goals in Kukar's 3–1 victory over Persegres Gresik United. On 7 October, he was involved in Mitra Kukar's 2–4 away win over Persegres Gresik United, scoring in the 51st minute. He was subbed off in the 65th minute, for suffering an injury which would saw him recover, he said that this injury was already present before the national team training camp and against Sriwijaya. He then scored a free kick against Persiba Balikpapan on 10 November in the game week 34 of Liga 1, in a 3–2 lose at Batakan Stadium. Through his goal, he was paired to Portuguese international Cristiano Ronaldo, because of similar knuckleball free kick technique, as well as being the best goal of the 2017 Liga 1 season. He won the award when it was announced at the Liga 1 Awarding Night event at Mulia Hotel, Senayan, Jakarta on 22 December. He beat goal nominations from Zulham Zamrun, Samsul Arif, Terens Puhiri, and Irfan Bachdim. Through the club official Instagram account, it was announced he would then extended his stay at the club until end the 2018 season. He contributed with 19 league appearances, scored 4 goals and 6 assists during his 2017 season.

==== 2018 season ====
Septian scored his first goal of the 2018 season on 13 April 2018, in a home game against Madura United. The game ended in a 3–1 victory for Mitra Kukar. He added his second goals of the season eight days later with one goal against Persipura Jayapura in a 2–1 away lose. He continued his good form with the opening goal in a 3–1 victory over Bali United on 11 May at the Aji Imbut Stadium. He scored in a 3–0 home win against Sriwijaya at Aji Imbut Stadium on 18 July. He continued his good form in October with give assists an opening goal by Aldino Herdianto in a 1–3 away win over PSMS Medan on 23 October, whilst also scored who made it 2–0 in the 34th minute. And continued scored his second goal in October in a 2–0 home win against PSIS Semarang five days later. Through his personal Instagram account, Septian will officially not be with Mitra Kukar for next season, Septian is rumored to be with several clubs, namely Barito Putera and PSIS Semarang. Mitra Kukar this season must be relegated to Liga 2 after collecting 39 points from 34 matches. Naga Mekes closed the 2018 Liga 1 by being in 16th place in the league standings. Meanwhile, Septian could not contribute much to Mitra Kukar this season due to the Indonesian national team agenda. He contributed 21 league appearances and scored 6 goals.

=== PSIS Semarang ===
On 21 January 2019, PSIS Semarang announced a deal for Septian to join Indonesian Liga 1 club PSIS on a free transfer. On 5 February 2019, Septian made his first appearance in the Round of 32 2018–19 Piala Indonesia in a 2–0 home win against Liga 3 club Persibat Batang. He also scored his first goal for PSIS, where he scored in the 32nd minutes.

Septian made his first Liga 1 appearance on 16 May 2019, coming on as a starter in a 1–2 lost against Kalteng Putra. He also scored his first league goal for PSIS, where he scored in the 20th minute. On 30 May 2019, Septian scored equalizer in a 1–1 draw over Persebaya Surabaya. In September 2019, with a market value of 3.6 billion rupiah, he's the most expensive player at PSIS Semarang. Septian give assists a winning goal by Heru Setyawan in PSIS's 0–1 away win over PSM Makassar on 11 September 2019. Septian scored his third goal for the club in a 2–1 lose against Persija Jakarta four days later. Septian give another assists an opening goal by Bruno Silva in PSIS's 2–2 draw over Borneo on 26 October 2019. He continued his good form in November with scored in a 3–0 home win over PSS Sleman on 2 November 2019, the three points keep PSIS away from the relegation zone with 28 points from 25 matches. He also continued his good form in December with give assists an opening goal by Hari Nur Yulianto, whilst also scored a brace in a 5–1 big win against Arema on 8 December 2019. He made 28 league appearances for PSIS Semarang during the 2019 season and scored six goals.

On 1 March 2020, he started his match in the 2020 Liga 1 season for PSIS, playing as a starter in a 2–0 lose over Persipura Jayapura. Septian only played 3 times for the club because the league was officially discontinued due to the COVID-19 pandemic.

Septian scored his first goal of the 2021–22 season on 15 October 2021, also give two assists in an 3–0 home win game against Persik Kediri. On 3 December, he scored the opening goal when the game was only in its 6th minute, scoring a free-kick in a 1–2 lose over PSS Sleman. By the end of the 2021–22 season, he was a starter in all of the club's Liga 1 fixtures, as PSIS finished in seventh place on the Liga 1 table.

Septian made his comeback to the squad, having previously been sidelined for a while due to a knee injury. In the match against Bhayangkara on 9 January 2023, Septian made his first appearance of the 2022–23 season, coming on as a substitute in the 72nd minute for Ridho Syuhada. Septian scored his first goal of the 2022–23 season on 4 February, opening the scoring with his acceleration past four opposing players in an away game against Persik Kediri. The game ended in a 1–2 victory for PSIS Semarang. On 17 February, Septian was a starter in Central Java Derby against Persis Solo at Jatidiri Stadium, also scored a penalty in the 79th minute in a 1–1 draw. On 1 March, he scored the opening goal, scoring a header in the 11th minute and give assists to Rizky Dwi Pangestu in PSIS's 3–2 lose over Bhayangkara. He added his fourth goals of the season on 2 April with one goal against PSS Sleman in a 5–2 home win at Jatidiri. On 9 June 2025, Septian officially left PSIS Semarang.

== International career ==
He was called up to the Indonesia national football team, and made his debut on 9 October 2016 in a friendly match against Vietnam at the Maguwoharjo Stadium, Sleman.

On 4 October 2017, he scored his first international goal for Indonesia in a 3–1 win against Cambodia in a friendly match.

== Personal life ==
He is a graduate of Yogyakarta State University (UNY), the Faculty of Sports Science with a concentration in sports coaching education.

== Career statistics ==
=== Club ===
As of 6 September 2026

Club	Season	League			Cup (Note: Includes Piala Indonesia)		Continental		Other		Total	
Club	Season	Division	Apps	Goals	Apps	Goals	Apps	Goals	Apps	Goals	Apps	Goals
Mitra Kukar	2015	Indonesia Super League	2	1	0	0	–		0	0	2	1
Mitra Kukar	2016	ISC A	29	5	0	0	–		0	0	29	5
Mitra Kukar	2017	Liga 1	19	4	0	0	–		4	0	23	4
Mitra Kukar	2018	Liga 1	21	6	1	1	–		2	0	24	7
Mitra Kukar	Total		71	16	1	1	–		6	0	78	17
PSIS Semarang	2019	Liga 1	28	6	2	0	–		3	0	33	6
PSIS Semarang	2020	Liga 1	3	0	0	0	–		0	0	3	0
PSIS Semarang	2021–22	Liga 1	26	2	0	0	–		0	0	26	2
PSIS Semarang	2022–23	Liga 1	16	5	0	0	–		0	0	16	5
PSIS Semarang	2023–24	Liga 1	31	2	0	0	–		0	0	31	2
PSIS Semarang	2024–25	Liga 1	31	5	0	0	–		0	0	31	5
PSIS Semarang	Total		135	20	2	0	–		3	0	140	20
Malut United	2025–26	Super League	13	2	0	0	–		0	0	13	2
Garudayaksa	2026–27	Super League	1	1	0	0	–		0	0	1	1
Career total			220	39	3	1	–		9	0	232	40

=== International ===
As of match played 19 November 2019

Appearances and goals by national team and year
National team	Year	Apps	Goals
Indonesia	2016	2	0
Indonesia	2017	4	1
Indonesia	2018	5	0
Indonesia	2019	1	0
Total		12	1

=== International goals ===
Scores and results list Indonesia's goal tally first.

#	Date	Venue	Opponent	Score	Result	Competition
1.	4 October 2017	Patriot Candrabhaga Stadium, Bekasi, Indonesia	Cambodia	3–1	3–1	Friendly

== Honours ==
=== Club ===
Mitra Kukar

- General Sudirman Cup: 2015

=== International ===
Indonesia U-23

- SEA Games bronze medal: 2017

Indonesia

- Aceh World Solidarity Cup runner-up: 2017

=== Individual ===
- Liga 1 Best Goal: 2017
- Liga 1 Best XI: 2017
