= Izaac Wanggai =

Indonesian association footballer

Personal information
- Full name: Izaac Yohanes Wanggai
- Date of birth: 19 May 1982 (age 44)
- Place of birth: Nabire, Indonesia
- Height: 1.70 m (5 ft 7 in)
- Position: Defensive midfielder

Team information
- Current team: Persipura Jayapura (assistant coach)

Senior career*
Years	Team	Apps	(Gls)
2005–2009	Perseman Manokwari	45	(2)
2009–2013	Persidafon Dafonsoro	106	(7)
2014–2018	Persipura Jayapura	30	(0)
2018	Persebaya Surabaya	5	(0)
2019–2021	Persewar Waropen	30	(3)
Total		216	(12)

Managerial career
- 2023–: Persipura Jayapura
- * Club domestic league appearances and goals

Izaac Yohanes Wanggai (born 19 May 1982) was an Indonesian retired footballer who formerly plays as a defensive midfielder.

His younger brother, Patrich Wanggai, and his cousin, Imanuel Wanggai, is also a football player.

== Honours ==
=== Club ===
Persipura Jayapura

- Indonesia Soccer Championship A: 2016
