= Oki Dwi Putra =

Indonesian football referee (born 1983)

- Full name: Oki Dwi Putra Senjaya
- Born: October 23, 1983 (age 42); Bandung, Indonesia

Domestic
Years	League	Role
2008–present	Indonesia Super League	Referee

International
Years	League	Role
2009–2010	FIFA listed	Assistant referee
2010–present	FIFA listed	Referee

Oki Dwi Putra Senjaya (born 23 October 1983) is an Indonesian professional football referee.
