= Fandry Imbiri =

Indonesian footballer

Personal information
- Full name: Fandry Imbiri
- Date of birth: 5 April 1992 (age 34)
- Place of birth: Jayapura, Indonesia
- Height: 1.79 m (5 ft 10 in)
- Position: Defender

Youth career
- Paradise FC Sentani
- PON Papua

Senior career*
Years	Team	Apps	(Gls)
2013–2015	Persipura Jayapura	4	(0)
2016–2017	Semen Padang	21	(0)
2017–2018	Persebaya Surabaya	37	(3)
2019–2021	Madura United	10	(0)
2021	PSS Sleman	6	(0)
2022	Madura United	9	(0)
2022–2023	Persik Kediri	2	(0)
2023	→ Persita Tangerang (loan)	6	(0)
2023	PSBS Biak	3	(0)

International career^{‡}
2013	Indonesia U23	1	(0)
- * Club domestic league appearances and goals as of 20 October 2023 ‡ National team caps and goals as of 1 December 2013

Fandry Imbiri (born 5 April 1992) is an Indonesian professional footballer who plays as a defender.

== Club career ==
=== Persipura Jayapura ===
After training with junior teams in his native Papua (province), Imbiri in 2013 joined the province's top club Persipura Jayapura when it was a dominant force in the Indonesian Super League, the top-tier of Indonesian football. However, he only could earn four playing chances in two years.

=== Semen Padang ===
Imbiri in 2016 left his home province to play for Semen Padang FC, a top-tier club in West Sumatra on the other side of the country. It was here that he earned his early playing time with 21 appearances, including in the 2016 Indonesia Soccer Championship A.

=== Persebaya Surabaya ===
His performance at Semen Padang caught the attention of Liga 2 club, Persebaya Surabaya, which was striving to return to top-flight football. Imbiri was an integral part of the Persebaya team that won the 2017 Liga 2 and earned promotion to Liga 1 (Indonesia).

=== Madura United ===
After a year in Liga 1 with Persebaya, Imbiri signed for Madura United to play in the 2019 Liga 1 season. However, Imbiri struggled to secure a starting position in the backline with only 10 appearances in two years.

=== PSS Sleman ===
Imbiri in 2021 joined Liga 1 club PSS Sleman as part of team upgrading after the change of ownership. He made his league debut on 1 November 2021 in a match against Borneo.

=== Persik Kediri ===
Imbiri was signed for Persik Kediri to play in Liga 1 in the 2022–23 season.

== Honours ==
=== Club ===
Persebaya Surabaya

- Liga 2: 2017

PSS Sleman

- Menpora Cup third place: 2021
