= Misbakus Solikin =

Indonesian association football player

Personal information
- Full name: Misbakus Solikin
- Date of birth: 1 September 1992 (age 34)
- Place of birth: Surabaya, Indonesia
- Height: 1.66 m (5 ft 5 in)
- Position: Central midfielder

Team information
- Current team: PSPS Pekanbaru
- Number: 4

Youth career
- SSB Al-Rayyan
- 2009–2014: PSIL Lumajang

Senior career*
Years	Team	Apps	(Gls)
2014–2015	Persekap Pasuruan	8	(0)
2016	Persatu Tuban	10	(0)
2017–2019	Persebaya Surabaya	68	(16)
2020–2022	PSS Sleman	23	(0)
2022–2024	Borneo Samarinda	7	(0)
2023–2024	→ Sriwijaya (loan)	14	(0)
2024–2025	Adhyaksa	14	(0)
2026–	PSPS Pekanbaru	13	(0)
- * Club domestic league appearances and goals as of 2 May 2026

Misbakus Solikin (born 1 September 1992) is an Indonesian professional footballer who plays as a central midfielder for Liga 2 club PSPS Pekanbaru.

== Career statistics ==
=== Club ===
As of match played 2 May 2026

Club	Season	League			Cup (Note: Includes Piala Indonesia)		Other (Note: Appearances in Indonesia President's Cup)		Total	
Club	Season	Division	Apps	Goals	Apps	Goals	Apps	Goals	Apps	Goals
Persekap Pasuruan	2014	Premier Division	8	0	0	0	0	0	8	0
Persekap Pasuruan	2015	Premier Division	0	0	0	0	0	0	0	0
Persekap Pasuruan	Total		8	0	0	0	0	0	8	0
Persatu Tuban	2016	ISC B	10	0	0	0	0	0	10	0
Persebaya Surabaya	2017	Liga 2	19	12	0	0	0	0	19	12
Persebaya Surabaya	2018	Liga 1	28	2	0	0	3	0	31	2
Persebaya Surabaya	2019	Liga 1	21	2	3	0	8	0	32	2
Persebaya Surabaya	Total		68	16	3	0	11	0	82	16
PSS Sleman	2020	Liga 1	0	0	0	0	0	0	0	0
PSS Sleman	2021–22	Liga 1	23	0	0	0	2 (Note: Appearances in Menpora Cup)	0	25	0
PSS Sleman	Total		23	0	0	0	2	0	25	0
Borneo	2022–23	Liga 1	7	0	0	0	4	0	11	0
Sriwijaya (loan)	2023–24	Liga 2	14	0	0	0	0	0	14	0
Adhyaksa	2024–25	Liga 2	14	0	0	0	0	0	14	0
PSPS Pekanbaru	2025–26	Liga 2	13	0	0	0	0	0	13	0
Career total			157	16	3	0	17	0	177	16

== Honours ==
Persebaya Surabaya

- Liga 2: 2017
- Liga 1 runner-up: 2019
- Piala Presiden runner-up: 2019

PSS Sleman

- Menpora Cup third place: 2021

Borneo Samarinda

- Piala Presiden runner-up: 2022
