= Muhammad Hidayat =

Indonesian association football player

Personal information
- Full name: Muhammad Hidayat
- Date of birth: 26 April 1996 (age 30)
- Place of birth: Bontang, Indonesia
- Height: 1.77 m (5 ft 10 in)
- Position: Defensive midfielder

Team information
- Current team: Barito Putera
- Number: 96

Youth career
- 2015–2016: Borneo

Senior career*
| Years | Team | Apps | (Gls) |
| 2016 | Borneo | 0 | (0) |
| 2017–2025 | Persebaya Surabaya | 134 | (1) |
| 2025–2026 | PSMS Medan | 10 | (0) |
| 2026 | → PSIS Semarang (loan) | 10 | (0) |
| 2026– | Barito Putera | 0 | (0) |
- * Club domestic league appearances and goals as of 3 May 2026

Muhammad Hidayat (born 26 April 1996) is an Indonesian professional footballer who plays as a defensive midfielder for Championship club Barito Putera.

== Career statistics ==
=== Club ===
As of 3 May 2026

| Club | Season | League | | | Cup (Note: Includes Piala Indonesia) | | Other (Note: Appearances in Indonesia President's Cup) | | Total | |
| Club | Season | Division | Apps | Goals | Apps | Goals | Apps | Goals | Apps | Goals |
|---|---|---|---|---|---|---|---|---|---|---|
| Borneo | 2016 | ISC A | 0 | 0 | 0 | 0 | 0 | 0 | 0 | 0 |
| Persebaya Surabaya | 2017 | Liga 2 | 21 | 1 | 0 | 0 | 0 | 0 | 21 | 1 |
| Persebaya Surabaya | 2018 | Liga 1 | 16 | 0 | 0 | 0 | 0 | 0 | 16 | 0 |
| Persebaya Surabaya | 2019 | Liga 1 | 28 | 0 | 2 | 0 | 6 | 0 | 36 | 0 |
| Persebaya Surabaya | 2020 | Liga 1 | 0 | 0 | 0 | 0 | 0 | 0 | 0 | 0 |
| Persebaya Surabaya | 2021–22 | Liga 1 | 26 | 0 | 0 | 0 | 4 (Note: Appearances in Menpora Cup) | 0 | 30 | 0 |
| Persebaya Surabaya | 2022–23 | Liga 1 | 27 | 0 | 0 | 0 | 1 | 0 | 28 | 0 |
| Persebaya Surabaya | 2023–24 | Liga 1 | 15 | 0 | 0 | 0 | 0 | 0 | 15 | 0 |
| Persebaya Surabaya | 2024–25 | Liga 1 | 1 | 0 | 0 | 0 | 0 | 0 | 1 | 0 |
| PSMS Medan | 2025–26 | Championship | 10 | 0 | 0 | 0 | 0 | 0 | 10 | 0 |
| PSIS Semarang (loan) | 2025–26 | Championship | 10 | 0 | 0 | 0 | 0 | 0 | 10 | 0 |
| Career total | | | 154 | 1 | 2 | 0 | 11 | 0 | 167 | 1 |

== Honours ==
=== Club ===
Persebaya Surabaya

- Liga 2: 2017
- Liga 1 runner-up: 2019
- Indonesia President's Cup runner-up: 2019
- East Java Governor Cup: 2020
