= Kurniawan Karman =

Indonesian footballer

Personal information
- Full name: Kurniawan Karman
- Date of birth: 29 March 1991 (age 35)
- Place of birth: Makassar, Indonesia
- Height: 1.65 m (5 ft 5 in)
- Positions: Full-back; midfielder

Senior career*
Years	Team	Apps	(Gls)
2010–2012	Pro Duta	26	(2)
2012–2015	PSM Makassar	41	(6)
2016–2017	Persiba Balikpapan	26	(2)
2017–2018	Persebaya Surabaya	12	(0)
2018	→ Persika Karawang (loan)	18	(2)
2019	Badak Lampung	29	(0)
2020–2021	Barito Putra	1	(0)
2021–2023	RANS Nusantara	21	(0)
2023–2025	PSMS Medan	37	(0)
2025–2026	Sumsel United	20	(1)

International career^{‡}
2012	Indonesia U21	6	(0)
- * Club domestic league appearances and goals as of 23:50, 26 April 2026 (UTC) ‡ National team caps and goals as of 23:50, 9 September 2012 (UTC)

Kurniawan Karman (born 29 March 1991) is an Indonesian professional footballer. Mainly a full-back, he can also operate as a central midfielder or right midfielder.

== Club career ==
He played for Pro Duta before moving in 2012 to PSM Makassar.

== International career ==
He had played for several youth national team levels. Karman called up to Indonesia under-21 team and played in 2012 Hassanal Bolkiah Trophy, but failed to win after losing 0-2 from Brunei under-21 team.

== Honours ==
=== Club ===
Persebaya Surabaya

- Liga 2: 2017

RANS Cilegon

- Liga 2 runner-up: 2021

=== International ===
Indonesia U-21

- Hassanal Bolkiah Trophy runner-up: 2012
