= Abu Rizal Maulana =

Indonesian association football player

Personal information
- Full name: Abu Rizal Maulana
- Date of birth: 27 August 1994 (age 32)
- Place of birth: Sampang, Indonesia
- Height: 1.65 m (5 ft 5 in)
- Positions: Defensive midfielder; right-back

Team information
- Current team: Persesa Sampang
- Number: 26

Youth career
- Bintang Angkasa
- Persesa Sampang

Senior career*
Years	Team	Apps	(Gls)
2016–2021	Persebaya Surabaya	73	(2)
2021	Sriwijaya	0	(0)
2021	Persiba Balikpapan	1	(0)
2022	PSM Makassar	0	(0)
2022–2024	Persita Tangerang	6	(0)
2025–	Persesa Sampang	3	(0)
- * Club domestic league appearances and goals as of 25 January 2025

Abu Rizal Maulana (born 27 August 1994) is an Indonesian professional footballer who plays as a defensive midfielder or right-back for Liga 4 club Persesa Sampang.

== Career statistics ==
=== Club ===
As of match played 25 January 2025

Club	Season	League			Cup (Note: Includes Piala Indonesia)		Other		Total	
Club	Season	Division	Apps	Goals	Apps	Goals	Apps	Goals	Apps	Goals
Persebaya Surabaya	2017	Liga 2	23	1	0	0	0	0	23	1
Persebaya Surabaya	2018	Liga 1	28	1	2	1	0	0	30	2
Persebaya Surabaya	2019	Liga 1	22	0	5	0	0	0	27	0
Persebaya Surabaya	2020	Liga 1	0	0	0	0	0	0	0	0
Persebaya Surabaya	Total		73	2	7	1	0	0	80	3
Sriwijaya	2021	Liga 2	0	0	0	0	0	0	0	0
Persiba Balikpapan	2021	Liga 2	1	0	0	0	0	0	1	0
PSM Makassar	2021–22	Liga 1	0	0	0	0	0	0	0	0
Persita Tangerang	2022–23	Liga 1	5	0	0	0	2 (Note: Appearances in Indonesia President's Cup)	1	7	1
Persita Tangerang	2023–24	Liga 1	1	0	0	0	0	0	1	0
Persita Tangerang	Total		6	0	0	0	2	1	8	1
Persesa Sampang	2024–25	Liga 4	3	0	0	0	0	0	3	0
Career total			83	2	7	1	2	1	92	4

== Honours ==
Persebaya Surabaya

- Liga 2: 2017
- East Java Governor Cup: 2020
- Indonesia President's Cup runner-up: 2019
