= Rendi Irwan =

Indonesian footballer

Personal information
- Full name: Rendi Irwan Saputra
- Date of birth: 26 April 1987 (age 39)
- Place of birth: Sidoarjo, Indonesia
- Height: 1.56 m (5 ft 1 in)
- Position: Attacking midfielder

Youth career
- SSB Kelud Cahaya Muda
- 2000–2006: Mitra Surabaya
- 2007–2008: PON Jatim

Senior career*
Years	Team	Apps	(Gls)
2006–2007	Persekam Metro		
2007–2008	PSBK Blitar		
2008–2009	Gresik United	7	(1)
2009–2010	Deltras Sidoarjo	3	(0)
2010–2011	Mitra Kukar	20	(4)
2011–2013	Persebaya 1927	42	(7)
2013–2014	Persik Kediri	18	(2)
2015	Persija Jakarta	0	(0)
2016	Persik Kediri	14	(2)
2017–2022	Persebaya Surabaya	89	(6)
2022–2025	Deltras	27	(2)

International career
2012	Indonesia	1	(0)
- * Club domestic league appearances and goals as of 18:26, 20 December 2024 (UTC)

Rendi Irwan Saputra (born 26 April 1987) is an Indonesian former footballer who last played as a midfielder for Liga 2 club Deltras. His cousin, Uston Nawawi, is also a football player.

== International career ==
He made his debut for Indonesia in 2014 FIFA World Cup qualification against Bahrain on 29 February 2012.

== Career statistics ==
=== International ===
As of match played 29 February 2012

Appearances and goals by national team and year
National team	Year	Apps	Goals
Indonesia	2012	1	0
Total		1	0

== Honours ==
=== Club ===
Persebaya Surabaya

- Liga Primer Indonesia: 2011
- Malaysia-Indonesia Unity Cup: 2011
- Indonesia Premier League runner-up: 2011–12
- Liga 2: 2017
- Liga 1 runner-up: 2019
- Indonesia President's Cup runner-up: 2019
- East Java Governor Cup: 2020
