= Miswar Saputra =

Indonesian footballer

Personal information
- Full name: Miswar Saputra
- Date of birth: 19 April 1996 (age 30)
- Place of birth: Takengon, Indonesia
- Height: 1.83 m (6 ft 0 in)
- Position: Goalkeeper

Team information
- Current team: Java United
- Number: 33

Senior career*
Years	Team	Apps	(Gls)
2015–2016	PSSB Bireuen	5	(0)
2016–2017	Persiraja Banda Aceh	2	(0)
2017–2019	Persebaya Surabaya	78	(0)
2020–2021	PSM Makassar	1	(0)
2021–2022	PSS Sleman	27	(0)
2022–2023	Madura United	14	(0)
2023–2024	Persik Kediri	1	(0)
2024–2025	Semen Padang	0	(0)
2025–2026	Madura United	29	(0)
2026–	Java United	0	(0)
- * Club domestic league appearances and goals as of 18:50, 7 March 2026 (UTC)

Miswar Saputra (born 19 April 1996) is an Indonesian professional footballer who plays as a goalkeeper for Super League club Java United.

== Career statistics ==
=== Club ===
As of match played 7 March 2026.

Club	Season	League			Cup (Note: Includes Piala Indonesia)		Continental		Other (Note: Appearances in Indonesia President's Cup)		Total	
Club	Season	Division	Apps	Goals	Apps	Goals	Apps	Goals	Apps	Goals	Apps	Goals
Persiraja Banda Aceh	2016	ISC B	2	0	0	0	0	0	0	0	2	0
Persebaya Surabaya	2017	Liga 2	15	0	0	0	0	0	0	0	15	0
Persebaya Surabaya	2018	Liga 1	31	0	0	0	0	0	3	0	34	0
Persebaya Surabaya	2019	Liga 1	32	0	3	0	0	0	5	0	40	0
Persebaya Surabaya	Total		78	0	3	0	0	0	8	0	89	0
PSM Makassar	2020	Liga 1	1	0	0	0	4 (Note: Appearances in AFC Cup)	0	0	0	5	0
PSS Sleman	2021–22	Liga 1	27	0	0	0	0	0	2 (Note: Appearances in Menpora Cup)	0	29	0
Madura United	2022–23	Liga 1	14	0	0	0	–		2	0	16	0
Persik Kediri	2023–24	Liga 1	1	0	0	0	–		0	0	1	0
Semen Padang	2024–25	Liga 1	0	0	0	0	–		0	0	0	0
Madura United	2024–25	Liga 1	13	0	0	0	4 (Note: Appearances in AFC Challenge League)	0	0	0	17	0
Madura United	2025–26	Super League	16	0	0	0	–		0	0	16	0
Career total			150	0	3	0	8	0	12	0	175	0

== Honours ==
=== Club ===
Persebaya Surabaya

- Liga 2: 2017
- Liga 1 runner-up: 2019
- Indonesia President's Cup runner-up: 2019

PSS Sleman

- Menpora Cup third place: 2021
