= Andri Muliadi =

Indonesian association football player

Personal information
- Full name: Andri Muliadi
- Date of birth: 26 February 1993 (age 33)
- Place of birth: Banda Aceh, Indonesia
- Height: 1.80 m (5 ft 11 in)
- Position: Centre-back

Youth career
- 2008–2011: 12 de Octubre Football Club

Senior career*
Years	Team	Apps	(Gls)
2013–2016	Persiraja Banda Aceh	21	(0)
2017–2019	Persebaya Surabaya	43	(0)
2020	Borneo	0	(0)
2021	Persela Lamongan	15	(0)
2022–2023	PSMS Medan	7	(0)
2023–2024	PSKC Cimahi	0	(0)
- * Club domestic league appearances and goals as of 17 December 2023

Andri Muliadi (born 26 February 1993) is an Indonesian professional footballer who plays as a centre-back.

== Honours ==
=== Club ===
Persebaya Surabaya

- Liga 2: 2017
- Liga 1 runner-up: 2019
- Indonesia President's Cup runner-up: 2019
