= Irfan Jaya =

Indonesian footballer

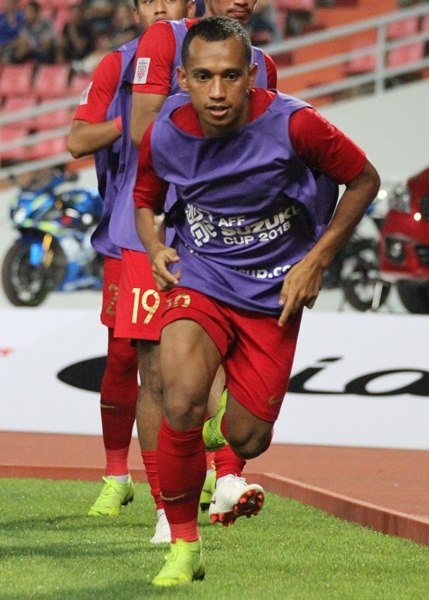
- Jaya warming up with Indonesia at the 2018 AFF Championship

Personal information
- Full name: Irfan Samaling Kumi
- Date of birth: 1 May 1996 (age 30)
- Place of birth: Bantaeng, Indonesia
- Height: 1.62 m (5 ft 4 in)
- Positions: Winger; forward

Team information
- Current team: Bali United
- Number: 41

Youth career
- SSB Butta Toa Raya
- 2016: PSM Makassar

Senior career*
Years	Team	Apps	(Gls)
2017–2021	Persebaya Surabaya	71	(25)
2021–2022	PSS Sleman	10	(6)
2022–	Bali United	125	(27)

International career
2018	Indonesia U23	5	(2)
2018–2022	Indonesia	22	(6)
Medal record
Men's football
Representing Indonesia
AFF Championship
Runner-up	2020 Singapore	Team
- * Club domestic league appearances and goals as of 22 November 2026

Irfan Samaling Kumi, better known as Irfan Jaya (born 1 May 1996), is an Indonesian professional footballer who plays as a winger or a forward for Super League club Bali United.

== Club career ==
=== Persebaya Surabaya ===
Irfan Jaya started his professional career in 2017 after signing a four-year contract with legendary club Persebaya Surabaya when it was trying to win promotion from Liga 2. He made his debut on 20 July 2017, coming on from the bench, and helped Persebaya win 1–0 over Madiun Putra at Wilis Stadium in Madiun. He won the best Liga 2 player award at the end of the season and was a key reason behind Persebaya's return to Liga 1 (Indonesia), the country's top-flight football league.

Surviving its first year after returning to Liga 1 with a respectable result in 2018, Persebaya strongly finished second in the 2019 Liga 1 with Irfan Jaya's significant contribution from the flanks. He scored 25 goals in his four years with Persebaya and became a fan favorite until his move to PSS Sleman.

=== PSS Sleman ===
Irfan Jaya in 2021 joined Liga 1 club PSS Sleman after its new management in 2020-21 drastically improved the club, including recruiting players who could boost a middling team into a new level. He made his debut on 5 September 2021 in a match against Persija Jakarta. On 29 September 2021, Irfan scored his first goal for PSS against Persebaya Surabaya in the 87th minute at the Wibawa Mukti Stadium, Bekasi. On 15 October 2021, Irfan scored a brace against Barito Putera in the 2021–22 Liga 1 at the Manahan Stadium, Surakarta, which PSS Sleman won 3–2. A weeks later, he scored in a 4–2 lose over Persib Bandung. On 1 November 2021, Irfan scored another brace, this time in a 1–2 win over Borneo.

=== Bali United ===
In January 2022, Irfan Jaya signed a contract with Liga 1 club Bali United. He made his league debut in a 3–0 win against Barito Putera on 9 January 2022 as a substitute for Rahmat in the 58th minute at the Ngurah Rai Stadium, Denpasar. On 12 February 2022, Irfan scored his first goal for Bali United, during a 3–0 league victory against Bhayangkara. On 31 March 2022, Irfan started in Bali United's last league match against Persik Kediri, He assisted the second goal of Rahmat, as the champions ended their league campaign with a 1–3 victory. On 24 June 2022, Irfan made his AFC Cup debut in a 2–0 group stage win against Kedah Darul Aman. The following matchday, he scored his first AFC Cup goal in a 5–2 defeat against Cambodian side Visakha. On 3 September 2022 during the match against Persebaya, Irfan suffered a fractured fibula after getting tackled by Rizky Ridho, which would kept him out for 2 months.

== International career ==
Irfan won his first international cap for Indonesia in a friendly match against Mauritius. He scored his first international goal for Indonesia with scored a brace in a match against Myanmar. Irfan was called into Indonesia's 2018 AFF Championship squad on 30 October 2018 by Bima Sakti.

In November 2021, Irfan was called up to the Indonesia national team in a friendly match in Turkey against Afghanistan and Myanmar by Shin Tae-yong. On 25 November 2021, he scored in a 4–1 win over Myanmar. In December 2021, he was named in Indonesian's squad for the 2020 AFF Championship in Singapore. On 12 December 2021, Irfan scored a goal against Laos in a 2020 AFF Championship group stage and he also bercame man of the match in that match. On 19 December 2021, He scored a brace in a 1–4 victory against Malaysia in Kallang.

== Career statistics ==
=== Club ===
As of match played 22 May 2026

Club	Season	League			Cup (Note: Includes Piala Indonesia)		League Cup		Continental (Note: Appearances in AFC Cup)		Other (Note: Appearances in Indonesia President's Cup)		Total	
Club	Season	Division	Apps	Goals	Apps	Goals	Apps	Goals	Apps	Goals	Apps	Goals	Apps	Goals
Persebaya Surabaya	2017	Liga 2	21	11	0	0			–		0	0	21	11
Persebaya Surabaya	2018	Liga 1	21	6	1	1			–		3	2	25	9
Persebaya Surabaya	2019	Liga 1	27	8	5	2			–		8	2	40	12
Persebaya Surabaya	2020	Liga 1	2	0	0	0			–		0	0	2	0
Persebaya Surabaya	Total		71	25	6	3			–		11	4	88	32
PSS Sleman	2021–22	Liga 1	10	6	0	0			–		8 (Note: Appearances in Menpora Cup)	2	18	8
Bali United	2021–22	Liga 1	13	1	0	0			–		0	0	13	1
Bali United	2022–23	Liga 1	21	2	0	0			3	1	1	0	25	3
Bali United	2023–24	Liga 1	27	5	0	0			5	0	0	0	32	5
Bali United	2024–25	Liga 1	32	8	0	0			0	0	0	0	32	8
Bali United	2025–26	Super League	22	5	0	0			–		0	0	22	5
Bali United	2026-27	Super League	10	5	0	0	1	1	-		0	0	11	6
Bali United	Total		125	27	0	0	1	1	8	1	1	0	135	28
Career total			206	57	6	3	1	1	8	1	20	6	241	68

=== International ===
As of match played 14 June 2022

Appearances and goals by national team and year
National team	Year	Apps	Goals
Indonesia	2018	5	2
Indonesia	2019	1	0
Indonesia	2020	0	0
Indonesia	2021	10	4
Indonesia	2022	6	0
Total		22	6

As of match played 14 June 2022. Indonesia score listed first, score column indicates score after each Irfan goal.

List of international goals scored by Irfan Jaya

#	Date	Venue	Opponent	Score	Result	Competition
1.	10 October 2018	Wibawa Mukti Stadium, Cikarang, Indonesia	Myanmar	2–0	3–0	Friendly
2.	10 October 2018	Wibawa Mukti Stadium, Cikarang, Indonesia	Myanmar	3–0	3–0	Friendly
3.	25 November 2021	Emirhan Sports Complex, Antalya, Turkey	Myanmar	2–0	4–1	Friendly
4.	12 December 2021	Bishan Stadium, Bishan, Singapore	Laos	2–0	5–1	2020 AFF Championship
5.	19 December 2021	National Stadium, Kallang, Singapore	Malaysia	1–1	4–1	2020 AFF Championship
6.	19 December 2021	National Stadium, Kallang, Singapore	Malaysia	2–1	4–1	2020 AFF Championship

== Honours ==
Persebaya Surabaya

- Liga 2: 2017
- Indonesia President's Cup runner-up: 2019
- East Java Governor Cup: 2020

PSS Sleman

- Menpora Cup third place: 2021

Bali United

- Liga 1: 2021–22

Indonesia

- AFF Championship runner-up: 2020

Individual

- Indonesia Soccer Championship U-21 Top Goalscorer: 2016
- Indonesia President's Cup Best Young Player: 2019
- Liga 2 Best Player: 2017
