= Rishadi Fauzi =

Indonesian association footballer

Personal information
- Full name: Rishadi Fauzi
- Date of birth: 4 July 1990 (age 36)
- Place of birth: Tangerang, Indonesia
- Height: 5 ft 11 in (1.80 m)
- Position: Forward

Youth career
- 2007: Abtraxs
- 2008–2009: Persita Tangerang

Senior career*
| Years | Team | Apps | (Gls) |
| 2009–2013 | Persita Tangerang | 69 | (8) |
| 2014–2015 | Sriwijaya | 11 | (0) |
| 2016–2017 | Madura United | 9 | (2) |
| 2017 | → Persebaya Surabaya (loan) | 19 | (7) |
| 2018 | Persebaya Surabaya | 18 | (3) |
| 2019 | Mitra Kukar | 17 | (2) |
| 2019 | → Persija Jakarta (loan) | 0 | (0) |
| 2020–2021 | Persis Solo | 0 | (0) |
| 2021–2023 | Dewa United | 21 | (2) |
| 2022 | → Persita Tangerang (loan) | 7 | (0) |
| 2023 | Gresik United | 0 | (0) |
| 2023–2024 | PSKC Cimahi | 15 | (3) |
| 2024–2025 | Deltras | 7 | (0) |
| 2025–2026 | Persiba Balikpapan | 12 | (0) |

International career
| 2011 | Indonesia U23 | 2 | (0) |
- * Club domestic league appearances and goals as of 12 April 2026

Rishadi Fauzi (born 4 July 1990) is an Indonesian professional footballer who plays as a forward. He also plays for Indonesia under-23 team for 2012 AFC Men's Pre-Olympic Tournament.

== Club career ==
=== Sriwijaya ===
In 2014, Rishadi signed a contract with Sriwijaya by trial player. He made his league debut on 6 February 2014 in a match against Pelita Bandung Raya.

=== Madura United ===
In 2016, Rishadi signed a contract with Liga 1 club Madura United for 2016 Indonesia Soccer Championship A. Rishadi made his debut against Mitra Kukar in the ninth week 2016 ISC A and he made his first goal for Madura United in a 3–2 win over Mitra Kukar.

=== Persebaya Surabaya ===
In early 2017, Rishadi Fauzi was loaned to Persebaya Surabaya and played in Liga 2 competition. After several matches, his playing style as a center forward proved to be suitable for the team's needs. In the next season, Persebaya Surabaya along with coach Angel Alfredo Vera decided to sign him permanently.

=== Mitra Kukar ===
In 2019, Rishadi Fauzi signed a contract with Indonesian Liga 2 club Mitra Kukar. He made 17 league appearances and scored 2 goals for PSS Sleman.

==== Persija Jakarta (loan) ====
He was signed for Persija Jakarta to play in the AFC Cup in the 2019 season, on loan from Mitra kukar.

=== Persis Solo ===
In 2020, Rishadi signed a contract with Indonesian Liga 2 club Persis Solo. This season was suspended on 27 March 2020 due to the COVID-19 pandemic. The season was abandoned and was declared void on 20 January 2021.

=== Dewa United ===
In 2021, Rishadi signed a contract with Indonesian Liga 2 club Dewa United. He made his league debut on 28 September against RANS Cilegon at the Gelora Bung Karno Madya Stadium, Jakarta. On 16 December 2021, Rishadi scored his first goal for Dewa United against PSIM Yogyakarta in the 81st minute at the Wibawa Mukti Stadium, Cikarang.

==== Return to Persita Tangerang ====
He was signed for Persita Tangerang to play in Liga 1 in the 2021 season, on loan from Dewa United. Rishadi made his league debut on 17 January 2022 in a match against Bali United as a substitute for Miftahul Hamdi in the 90th minute at the Ngurah Rai Stadium, Denpasar.

== Honours ==
Persita Tangerang U-21

- Indonesia Super League U-21 runner-up: 2008-09

Persita Tangerang

- Liga Indonesia Premier Division runner-up: 2011–12

Persebaya Surabaya

- Liga 2: 2017

Dewa United

- Liga 2 third place (play-offs): 2021
