= Beria (disambiguation) =

Beria may refer to:

== People ==
- Bakiye Beria Onger (1921–2015), Turkish feminist activist
- Lavrentiy Beria (1899–1953), Soviet politician
- Franck Béria (born 1983), French footballer
- Shiv Kumar Beria, Indian politician

=== Fictional characters ===
- Teresa Beria (テレサ=ベリア, Тереза Берия), a fictional character from The Qwaser of Stigmata

== Places ==
- Beria, Western Australia, Australia; an abandoned town
- Beria de Jos, Oporelu, Olt, Muntenia, Romania
- Beria de Sus, Oporelu, Olt, Muntenia, Romania

== Other uses ==
- Beria language (ISO 639 language code: zag), a Saharan language
- Beria (genus), a moth genus; an alternate name of the Loryma (moth)

== See also ==
- Beria alphabet for the Beria language
- Berria, a Basque language newspaper from the Basque country
- Beriah (disambiguation)
- Berrian (disambiguation)
- Berrien (disambiguation)
- Bery (disambiguation)
- Beri (disambiguation)
- Ber (disambiguation)
