= Burry =

Burry is a surname. Notable people with the surname include:

- Andrew George Burry (1873–1975), businessman, manufacturer and philanthropist
- Harold Burry (1912–1992), head football coach at Westminster College
- Hugh Burry (1930–2013), New Zealand rugby union player
- Lester Burry (1898–1977), United Church minister
- Mark Burry (born 1957), New Zealand architect
- Michael Burry, American investment fund manager

== See also ==
- Barry (disambiguation)
- Berry (disambiguation)
- Burri
- Burry Holms
- Burry Port
- Bury (disambiguation)
- The Burry Man
