= Berrian =

Berrian may refer to:

== Places ==
- Berrian Mountain, mountain in Jefferson County, Colorado, United States
- Berrian, Washington, unincorporated community in Benton County, Washington, United States

== People ==
- Bernard Berrian (born 1980), American football player
- Herron Berrian (born 1994), Liberian soccer player
- Tony Berrian (born 1979), American sprinter
- Lee Berrian Powell (1908–1944), American actor
- William Berrian Vail (1823–1904), Canadian businessman and politician

== See also ==
- Boris Berian (born 1992), U.S. runner
- Berriane, Bérianne, Ghardaia, Algeria
- Bérianne District, Ghardaia, Algeria
- Berrien (disambiguation)
- Berri (disambiguation)
- Berry (disambiguation)
- Beria (disambiguation)
