= Berrien =

Berrien may refer to:

== People ==
- Berrien (surname)
- Berrien Moore (1941–2024), American mathematician and earth scientist
- Berrien Kinnard Upshaw (1901–1949), husband of Margaret Mitchell

== Places ==
- Berrien County, Georgia, USA
  - Berrien County School District; including Berrien High School, Berrien Middle School, Berrien Elementary School
- Berrien County, Michigan, USA
- Berrien Charter Township, Michigan, USA
- Berrien City, New Jersey, USA
- Berrien, Finistère, France; a commune of the Finistère département

== See also ==
- Berrien's Island, East River, New York City, New York State, USA
- Berrien County Courthouse (disambiguation)
- Berrien County (disambiguation)
- Berrian (disambiguation)
- Berri (disambiguation)
- Ber (disambiguation)
