= Barrie (disambiguation) =

Barrie is a city in Ontario, Canada.

Barrie may also refer to:

- Barrie (company), a fashion company owned by Chanel
- Barrie (name)
- Barrie (band) a dream-pop band
- Barrie (federal electoral district), a former Canadian federal electoral district
- Barrie (provincial electoral district), a former Canadian provincial electoral district
- Barrie line, a train line in the Greater Toronto Area, Ontario, Canada
- Barrie School, a private school in Silver Spring, Maryland
- HMCS Barrie, a Royal Canadian Navy corvette

== See also ==
- Barre (disambiguation)
- Barry (disambiguation)
- Berry (disambiguation)
