= Beriah =

Beriah is a male given name from the Bible.

== People ==
- Beriah (biblical figure), several biblical figures
- Beriah Botfield (1807–1863), UK politician
- Beriah Brown (1815–1900), U.S. newspaper publisher
- Beriah Gwynfe Evans (1848–1927), UK politician and Welsh natinoalist
- Beriah Green (1795–1874), U.S. political activist and abolitionist
- Beriah Magoffin (1815–1885), U.S. politician, a governor of Kentucky
- Beriah Moore (1919–2005), UK soccer player
- Beriah Palmer (1740–1812), U.S. politician
- Beriah Wilkins (1846–1905), U.S. politician

== See also ==
- James Beriah Frazier, Sr. (1856–1937), U.S. politician, a governor of Tennessee
- James Beriah Frazier, Jr. (1890–1978), U.S. politician, son of the eponymous governor
- Beria (disambiguation)
- Berrian (disambiguation)
- Berrien (disambiguation)
