= Berrien County Courthouse =

Berrien County Courthouse may refer to:

== Places ==
- Berrien County Courthouse (Georgia), Nashville, Berrien County, Georgia, USA
- Old Berrien County Courthouse Complex, Berrien Springs, Berrien County, Michigan, USA
- Berrien County Courthouse, St. Joseph, Berrien County, Michigan, USA; where the Berrien County Courthouse shooting occurred

== Other uses ==
- Berrien County Courthouse shooting, at the Berrien County Courthouse, St. Joseph, Berrien County, Michigan, USA, in 2016

== See also ==
- Berrien County (disambiguation)
- Berrien (disambiguation)
