= Piru Singh =

Recipient of Param Vir Chakra

Company Havildar Major Piru Singh Shekhawat PVC
- Born: 20 May 1918; Beri, Rajputana, British Raj (present-day Jhunjhunu district, Rajasthan, India)
- Died: 18 July 1948 (aged 30); Tithwal, Territory of Jammu and Kashmir, India
- Military career
- Allegiance: British India; Republic of India
- Branch: British Indian Army; Indian Army
- Service years: 1936–1948
- Rank: Company Havildar Major
- Service number: 2831592
- Unit: 6th Battalion, Rajputna Rifles
- Conflicts: Indo-Pakistani War of 1947
- Awards: Param Vir Chakra

Company Havildar Major (Note: The rank of company havildar major is no longer in use in the Indian Army except Regiment of Artillery and Army Air Defence.) Piru Singh Shekhawat (20 May 1918 – 18 July 1948) was an Indian Army non-commissioned officer, awarded the Param Vir Chakra (PVC) posthumously, India's highest military decoration for gallantry. Born serving British Raj, later Singh enrolled in the British Indian Army on 20 May 1936, and was assigned to the 1st Punjab Regiment. Between 1940 and 1945, he served on the North-West Frontier and as an instructor, before deploying to Japan as part of the British Commonwealth Occupation Force. After independence, he took part in the Indo-Pakistani War of 1947, serving with the Indian Army's 6th Rajputana Rifles. During the battle, Singh was part of the leading section of a company that was assigned to capture a Pakistani post at Tithwal, in Jammu and Kashmir. Soon after their attack was launched, the company suffered heavy casualties. In time, Singh successfully occupied a Pakistani medium machine-gun post. But, by that time, the entire company lay dead or wounded. Singh was left alone to achieve the objective. He moved out and lobbed grenades at the next enemy post. Before moving to another trench, he received a mortal bullet wound to the head.

== Early life ==
Piru Singh was born during the late British Raj on 20 May 1918, in the tiny village Rampura in Beri, Rajputana. He was the son of Lal Singh. His family consisted of seven children—three brothers and four sisters—with Singh being the youngest son. As a young boy, Singh always hated school, as he was unable to cope with the restricted environment. One day, after being scolded by his class teacher for quarreling with one of his classmates, Singh ran away, and never returned to school. After that, Singh continued to help his parents in their farm, and grew up to be well-built and handsome youth. Shikar, a local Indian sport, was his favourite game. Though Singh wanted to join the army from his childhood, he was rejected twice, as he was too young, before he was accepted at the age of eighteen.

== Military career ==
Piru Singh Shekhawat was enrolled in the 10th Battalion of the 1st Punjab Regiment on 20 May 1936 at Jhelum. After completion of his training, on 1 May 1937, Singh was posted to the 5th Battalion of the same regiment. Despite his earlier hostility to schooling, Singh took education seriously and passed the Indian Army Class Certificate of Education. After clearing a few other tests, he was promoted to lance naik (lance corporal) on 7 August 1940. During his tenure with the 5th Battalion of the 1st Punjab, he saw action on the North-West Frontier.

In March 1941, he was promoted to naik (corporal), and was posted as an instructor to the Punjab Regimental Centre at Jhelum in September. In February 1942, he was promoted to havildar (sergeant). Singh was an outstanding sportsman, he represented his regiment in hockey, basketball and cross-country running at inter-regimental and national level championships. In May 1945, he was promoted to company havildar major (company sergeant major). He served as an instructor until October 1945. After the end of the Second World War, he was sent to Japan as part of the British Commonwealth Occupation Force, where he served until September 1947. Following the partition, Singh was transferred to the 6th Battalion of the Rajputana Rifles.

=== War of 1947 ===
Following tensions between the newly independent nations of India and Pakistan, war broke out over control of the princely state of Jammu and Kashmir in October 1947, shortly after Singh returned from Japan. In July 1948, Pakistan launched offensive strikes in the Tithwal sector of Jammu and Kashmir, and captured a ring contour on 8 July. This forced the Indian troops stationed in the forward positions across Kishanganga River to retreat. In an attempt to reverse the situation, Singh's unit, the 6th Battalion of the Rajputana Rifles, was moved from Uri to Tithwal, and was assigned to the 163rd Brigade. The troops took position on the Tithwal bridge.

On 11 July, the Indian troops commenced their attack. These strikes continued for another four days. But reports regarding the situation suggested that the Pakistanis were still in command of a strategically important position and the Indian commanders decided that these had to be captured before the advance could continue. Apart from this position, another position was also to be captured by the Indians. The task of capturing these two positions was assigned to the 6th Rajputana Rifles. Two companies were assigned to the operation, with the battalion's 'C' Company securing the second position after the first was captured by 'D' Company.

On 18 July, the 'D' Company launched it first attack at 01:30. The path to the position held by the Pakistani troops was just 1 metre (3 ft 3 in) wide, and deep ravines lay on either side. This narrow path was overlooked by hidden Pakistani bunkers that allowed both observation and clear fields of fire for the defending troops. As they advanced, the Indian company was subjected to heavy shelling from the Pakistanis, and within half an hour the company had recorded fifty-one casualties.

During the battle, Singh's section, leading the company, was sheared down to half strength due to heavy casualties. Singh rushed towards a Pakistani medium machine gun post, which was causing most of the casualties, during which he suffered multiple shrapnel wounds across his body as the Pakistani defenders began rolling grenades down from the heights. Undeterred, Singh continued to advance adopting the battle cry, "Raja Ramchandra Ki Jai" (English: Hail Lord Rama). Soon he occupied the post killing the men on guard with his bayonet and Sten gun.

But by the time he captured the position, the rest of his company lay dead or wounded. Singh was left alone to achieve the objective assigned. He advanced towards the second Pakistani medium machine gun post. At this juncture, he was almost blinded by a grenade that blast at his face. His Sten gun ammunition had run out. Singh moved out of the trench and lobbed grenades at the next Pakistani post. Meanwhile, he jumped into another trench, and killed two Pakistani soldiers with his bayonet. Before he was able to move out of the trench, he was hit by a bullet in his head. As he succumbed to his wounds, Singh hurled a grenade into a nearby Pakistani trench.

=== Param Vir Chakra ===
On 17 July 1948, Company Havildar Major Singh was posthumously awarded the India's highest military decoration, the Param Vir Chakra. The citation reads of follows:

South of Tithwal, 'D' Company, of which No 2831592 Piru Singh, was Havildar Major was detailed to attack and capture an enemy occupied hill feature. The enemy had well dug in positions and had sited his MMGs so as to cover all possible approaches. As the attack advanced, it was met with heavy MMG fire from both flanks. Volleys of grenades were hurled down from enemy bunkers. Company Havildar Major Piru Singh was then with the forward most Section of the company. Seeing more than half of the Section killed or wounded, he did not lose courage. With battle cries he encouraged the remaining men and rushed forward with great determination onto the nearest enemy MMG position. Grenade splinters ripping his clothes and wounding him at several places, he continued to advance without the least regard for his safety. He was on top of the MMG position wounding the gun crew with Sten gun fire. With complete disregard to his bleeding wounds he made a mad jump on the MMG crew bayoneting them to death, thus silencing the gun. By then he suddenly realized that he was the sole survivor of the section, the rest of them either dead or wounded. Another grenade thrown at him wounded him in the face. With blood dripping from his face wounds in his eyes, he crawled out of the trench, hurling grenades at the next enemy position.

— Gazette Notification: 8 Pres./52, 16.1.52,

== Honours and decorations ==

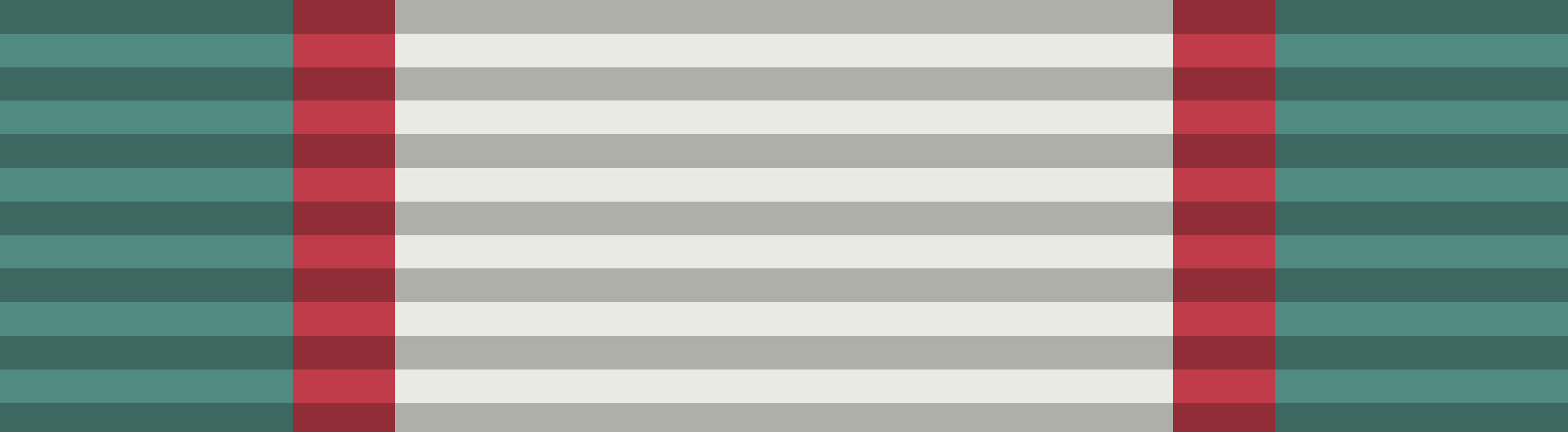

	Param Vir Chakra	General Service Medal	
India General Service Medal (1936)	Indian Independence Medal	India Service Medal 1939–1945	War Medal 1939–1945

== Legacy ==
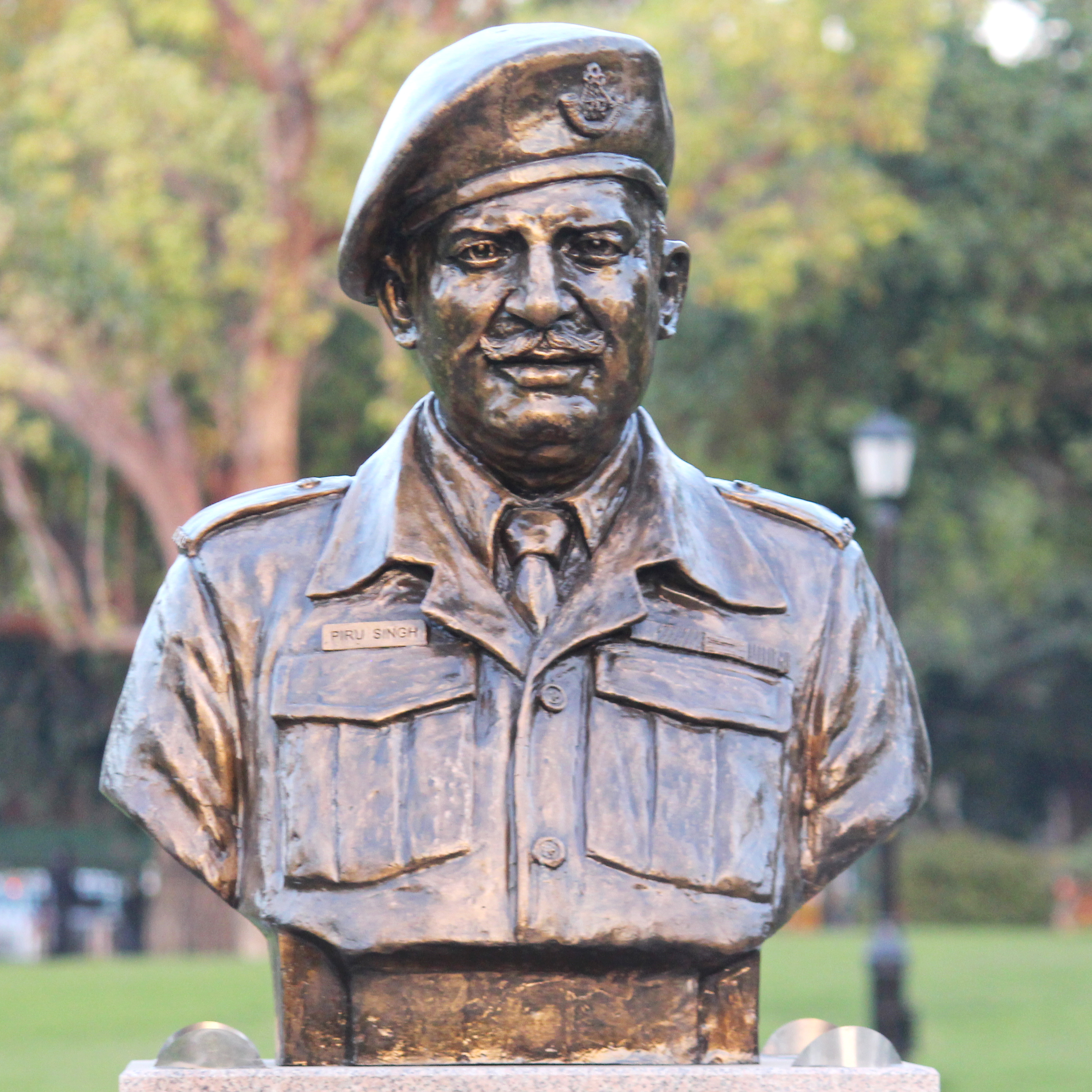
Piru Singh's statue at Param Yodha Sthal, National War Memorial

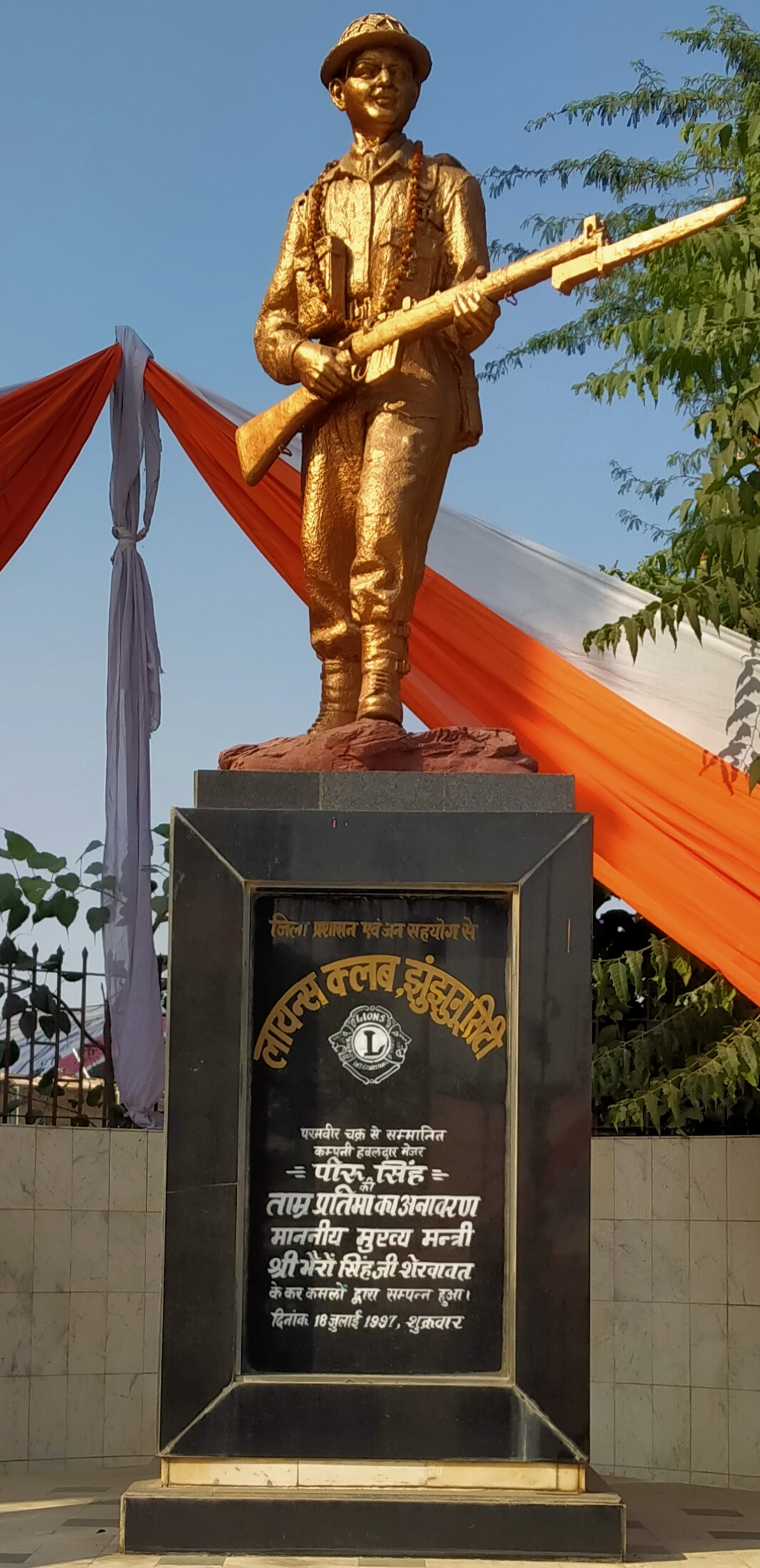
Piru Singh statue at Piru Singh Circle, Jhunjhunu.

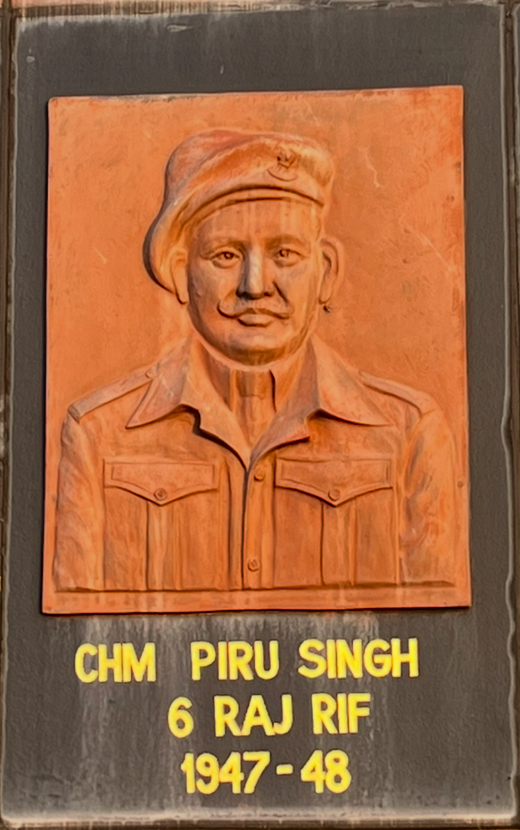
Relief Sculpture at Balidan Stambh Jammu

Singh was married and had a son named Om Prakash Singh. In the 1980s, the Shipping Corporation of India (SCI), a Government of India enterprise operating under the aegis of the Ministry of Shipping, named fifteen of her crude oil tankers in honour of the Param Vir Chakra recipients. The crude oil tanker named MT "Company Havildar Major Piru Singh, PVC" was delivered to SCI on 12 October 1984. Due to the MARPOL Convention on single hull tankers, SCI phased out all its fifteen PVC series crude tankers on completion of their economic age of 25 years. A road roundabout called "Shahid Piru Singh Shekhawat Circle" was named after him, in Jhunjhunu, by the Government of Rajasthan. An intersection called "Piru Singh Chowk" has been named after him in Yol, Himachal Pradesh. The war memorial Balidan Stambh in Jammu, Jammu and Kashmir in 2009 paid tribute to him by inscribing his name on the pillars arranged in a semi-circle for the martyrs of the 1947-48 war. His name is displayed near the Amar Jawan Jyoti (Eternal Flame) and as a relief mural on the other semi-circular wall with the Param Vir Chakra awardees who attained martyrdom in J&K.

== In popular culture ==
- The fifth episode of TV Series Param Vir Chakra, aired on DD National featured him in 1988 .
- A graphic novel titled Param Vir Chakra by Amar Chitra Katha dedicated their 5th story written by Sahil Rizwan and drawn by Rakesh C S in 2015
- A graphic novel titled Param Vir Chakra Piru Singh by Roli Books written by Ian Cardozo and drawn by Rishi Kumar in 2019

== Notes ==
Footnotes

Citations
