= Barry =

Barry may refer to:

== People ==
- Barry (name), can be a given name, nickname or surname, and fictional characters can have it as their given name

== Places ==
=== Canada ===
- Barry Lake, Quebec
- Barry Islands, Nunavut

=== United Kingdom ===
- Barry, Angus, Scotland, a village
  - Barry Mill, a watermill
  - Barry Links railway station
- Barry, Vale of Glamorgan, Wales, a town
  - Barry Island, a seaside resort
  - Barry Railway Company
  - Barry railway station

=== United States ===
- Barry, Illinois, a city
- Barry, Minnesota, a city
- Barry, Texas, a city
- Barry County, Michigan
- Barry County, Missouri
- Barry Township (disambiguation), in several states
- Fort Barry, Marin County, California, a former US Army installation

=== Elsewhere ===
- Barry Island (Debenham Islands), Antarctica
- Barry, New South Wales, Australia, a village
- Barry, Hautes-Pyrénées, France, a commune

== Arts and entertainment ==
- Barry (album) (1980), by Barry Manilow
- "Barry", a character from the Marillion cover art of the 2001 album Anoraknophobia
- Barry (1949 film), a French film
- Barry (2016 film), an American film
- Barry (TV series) (2018–2023), an American dark comedy series
- Barry Award (for crime novels)
- Barry Award, name, from 2000–2018, of the Melbourne International Comedy Festival Award

== Other uses ==
- Barry (heraldry)
- Barry (dog) (1800–1814), a mountain rescue St. Bernard
- Barry (radio), an Australian radio station
- Barry (UK Parliament constituency)
- Barry University, a private Catholic university in Miami Shores, Florida
- USS Barry, four US destroyers
- 1703 Barry, a minor planet
- Barry (owl), New York City owl
- List of storms named Barry

== See also ==
- De Barry family
- Dubarry (disambiguation)
- Barre (disambiguation)
- Barrie (disambiguation)
- Barry's (disambiguation)
- Berry (disambiguation)
