= Lynn Berry =

Lynn Berry may refer to:

- Lynn Berry (NBC news personality), American television anchor and occasional co-host on Weekend Today; host of Early Today

== See also ==
- Lynn Norenberg Barry (born 1959), American basketball player
- Berry (disambiguation)
