= Berr =

Berr is a surname. Notable people with the surname include:

- Friedrich Berr (1794–1838), German clarinetist and composer
- Hans Berr (1890–1917), German First World War flying ace
- Hélène Berr (1921–1945), Jewish and French woman
- Henri Berr (1863–1954), French philosopher

== See also ==
- Ber (disambiguation)
- BERR, Department for Business, Enterprise and Regulatory Reform in United Kingdom
