= Dubarry =

Dubarry, DuBarry or du Barry may refer to:

- Madame du Barry (1743–1793), mistress of King Louis XV of France
  - Du Barry, a 1901 play by David Belasco
  - DuBarry (film), a lost 1915 American-Italian silent film about Madame du Barry
  - Madame Du Barry (1917 film), a US film starring Theda Bara
  - Madame Dubarry (1919 film), a German film directed by Ernst Lubitsch and starring Pola Negri
  - A Modern Dubarry, a 1927 German silent film
  - Du Barry, Woman of Passion, a 1930 film starring Norma Talmadge
  - Madame Du Barry (1934 film), starring Delores del Rio
  - The Loves of Madame Dubarry, a 1935 British historical film
  - Du Barry Was a Lady, a 1939 Broadway musical of the 1930s-1940s
  - Du Barry Was a Lady (film), a 1943 American film starring Lucille Ball
  - Madame du Barry (1954 film), a French film
  - The Dubarry (film), a 1951 German musical film
  - Jeanne du Barry (film), a 2023 French film
- Dubarry of Ireland, a footwear and clothing company
- Dubarry Park, a rugby union stadium in Ireland
- Michelle DuBarry (1931–2026), Canadian drag queen
- Thibault Dubarry (born 1987), French rugby union player
- Soup du Barry (also Velouté du Barry and Crème du Barry), a cauliflower soup

== See also ==
- Barry (disambiguation)
- Du Barry (surname)
