= Beri =

Beri may refer to:

== People ==
- Beri Gerwise (born 1997), Swedish actress
- Beri Pardo (born 1990), Portuguese-Turkish association football strategist and analyst
- Beri Rahmada (born 1998), Indonesian former footballer
- Beri Santoso (born 2004), Indonesian footballer
- Beri Thimappa, 17th century Indian interpreter and chief negotiator for agents of the British East India Company
- Beri Weber (born 1984), American Jewish religious singer, songwriter and educator
- Bronson Beri (born 1989), New Zealand former basketball player
- Jasna Beri (born 1954), Bosnian actress
- Rajinder Beri (born 1962), Indian politician
- Ritu Beri, Indian fashion designer
- Zaghawa people, also called Beri, an African ethnic group

== Places ==
=== India ===
- Beri State, a former princely state of northern India
- Beri, Jhajjar, a town in the Jhajjar district of Haryana
- Beri, Rajasthan, a village

=== Elsewhere ===
- Beri, Iran, a village in West Azerbaijan Province
- Beri, Montenegro, a village

== See also ==
- Bery (disambiguation)
- Berri (disambiguation)
- Beeri, two people in the Bible
- Be'eri, Israel, a kibbutz
- Berry (disambiguation)
- Beriberi, a medical condition caused by a deficit in vitamin B1
