= Barry's =

Barry's may refer to:

- Barry's (company), an American fitness brand
- Barry's Tea, an Irish tea company
- Barry's Amusements, the largest amusement park in Northern Ireland

== See also ==
- Barry (disambiguation)
