= Berrien County =

Berrien County may refer to:

== Counties ==
Berrien County is the name of two counties in the United States, both named for John M. Berrien:

- Berrien County, Georgia
- Berrien County, Michigan

== Other uses ==
- Berrien County School District, Berrien County, Georgia, USA

== See also ==
- Berrien County Courthouse (disambiguation)
- Berrien (disambiguation)
