= Berry (disambiguation) =

A berry is a small, pulpy and often edible fruit in non-technical language. In botany, berry (botany) has a different definition: a fleshy fruit without a stone, produced from a single flower containing one ovary.

Berry may also refer to:

== Places ==
=== United States ===
- Berry, Alabama, a town
- Berry, Kentucky, a home rule-class city
- Berry, Wisconsin, a town

=== Elsewhere ===
- Berry, France, a province of France
  - Canal de Berry
- Berry, New South Wales, a town in Australia
- Berry, Quebec, a municipality in Canada
- Berry Fen, Cambridgeshire, England, a biological Site of Special Scientific Interest
- Berry Head, a coastal headland that forms the southern boundary of Tor Bay in Devon, England
- Berry Peak, highest point of Wrangel Island

== People and fictional characters ==
- Berry (surname), a list of people
- Berry (given name), a list of people and fictional characters with the given name or nickname
- Berry (singer), stage name of French singer and actress Élise Pottier (born 1978)

== Businesses ==
- Berry Corporation, an American hydrocarbon exploration company
- Berry Global, a manufacturer and marketer of plastic packaging products
- Berry Aviation, an American charter airline

== Other uses ==
- Hotel Berry, North Dakota, on the National Register of Historic Places
- HMS Berry, a Royal Navy Second World War frigate
- Berry Airfield, a former World War II airfield near Port Moresby, Papua New Guinea
- Berry College, a liberal arts college located in Mount Berry, Georgia, USA
- Berry Center of Northwest Houston, commonly known as the Berry Center, a multi-purpose sports complex in Cypress, Texas
- Berry Events Center, a multi-purpose arena in Marquette, Michigan

== See also ==
- The Berrys, a comic strip (1942–1974)
- Berrie, a Japanese band (1985–2006)
- Barrie (disambiguation)
- Barry (disambiguation)
- Beri (disambiguation)
- Berri (disambiguation)
- Mount Berry (disambiguation)
