= Bery =

Bery may refer to:

== People ==
- John Bery
- Robert Bery
- Suman Bery, Indian economist

== Other ==
- Ynys Bery, Wales
- Boston Elevated Railway

== See also ==
- Beri (disambiguation)
- Berry (disambiguation)
