= List of The Qwaser of Stigmata episodes =

The Qwaser of Stigmata is an anime series adapted from the manga of the same name written by Hiroyuki Yoshino and illustrated by Kenetsu Satō. Produced by Hoods Entertainment and directed by Hiraku Kaneko, the series was broadcast on the Mainichi Broadcasting System on January 10 to June 20, 2010, with a second season airing from April 12 to June 28, 2011. The Qwaser of Stigmata hydroplanes across the common magical girl concept shown in series such as Sailor Moon and My-Hime while availing acts of sexual perversion and violence that includes torsos being forcibly torn asunder along with heavy use of fanservice that has led to the TV broadcast of the episodes having been censored earlier. The raw uncensored "Director's Cut" version of the anime is available only by webcast or DVD/Blu-ray. The word master series is called "Quantum Meruit Quorum".

The first season adapts the first seven volumes of the manga over 20 episodes, with the last four episodes forming an original, self-contained story arc. Some episodes containing inappropriate previews have them replaced by a short recap episode in the TV version.

As of July 2010, four volumes have been released in Japan on DVD and Blu-ray by Victor Entertainment, based on director's cut version, but with reemed images and remixed audio along with new cuts. The first volume was released on April 21, 2010. The eight and last volume will be released on November 24, 2010. Each volume contains three episodes, as well as two pictures dramas per volume. The first series of them is Bugger Me! Secret of The Qwaser of Stigmata (ドキッ！ 聖痕のクェイサー秘, Doki! Seikon no Kueisā no Himitsu) featuring the different female main character per volume. The second of them is Let's play with Katja (カーチャ様と遊ぼう, Kācha-sama to asobou) featuring Katja.

Sentai Filmworks licensed both seasons and the OVA for digital distribution and home video release in North America, releasing English subtitled DVD sets in 2012 and 2013. All episodes except for the OVA are available online in North America from the Anime Network streaming site.

== Episode list ==
=== The Qwaser of Stigmata ===
No.	Title	Original release date
1	"The Trembling Night"; Transliteration: "Furueru Yoru" (Japanese: 震える夜)	January 10, 2010
2	"Masked Friendship"; Transliteration: "Kamen no Yūjō" (Japanese: 仮面の友情)	January 17, 2010
3	"Those Who Seek"; Transliteration: "Motomeshi Mono-tachi" (Japanese: 求めし者たち)	January 24, 2010
4	"The Queen and I"; Transliteration: "Joō-sama to Atashi" (Japanese: 女王様とあたし)	January 31, 2010
5	"White Lilies of the Battlefield"; Transliteration: "Senjō no Shirayuri" (Japanese: 戦場の白ユリ)	February 7, 2010
6	"Imperial Princess in the Making"; Transliteration: "Ōjo no Tamago" (Japanese: 皇女の卵)	February 14, 2010
7	"Drifting Maria"; Transliteration: "Hyōhaku no Maria" (Japanese: 漂泊の生神女(マリア))	February 21, 2010
8	"Atomis of Twin Masks (Part 1)"; Transliteration: "Sōmen no Atomisu (Zenpen)" (Japanese: 双面のアトミス(前編))	February 28, 2010
9	"Atomis of Twin Masks (Part 2)"; Transliteration: "Sōmen no Atomisu (Kōhen)" (Japanese: 双面のアトミス(後編))	March 7, 2010
10	"First Time (?) House-Sitting"; Transliteration: "Hajimete(?) no O-rusuban" (Japanese: はじめて(？)のおるすばん)	March 14, 2010
11	"Witch's Crucifix"; Transliteration: "Majo no Jūjika" (Japanese: 魔女の十字架)	March 21, 2010
12	"The Blade of Fresh Blood"; Transliteration: "Senketsu no Tsurugi" (Japanese: 鮮血の剣)	March 28, 2010
13	"Night of the Communal Hot Spring"; Transliteration: "Gantetsusen no Yoru" (Japanese: 含鉄泉の夜)	April 4, 2010
14	"The Melancholy of Miyuri Tsujido"; Transliteration: "Tsujidō Miyuri no Yūutsu" (Japanese: 辻堂美由梨の憂鬱)	April 11, 2010
15	"Anglo-Russian Entente"	April 18, 2010
16	"The Condemned Phoenix"; Transliteration: "Danzai no fenikusu" (Japanese: 断罪の不死鳥(フェーニクス))	April 25, 2010
17	"Gospel of Flame"; Transliteration: "Honō no gosuperu" (Japanese: 炎の福音(ゴスペル))	May 2, 2010
18	"The Trap of Ouroboros"; Transliteration: "Uroborosu no Wana" (Japanese: ウロボロスの罠)	May 9, 2010
19	"Secret Garden"; Transliteration: "Himitsu no Hanazono" (Japanese: 秘密の花園)	May 16, 2010
20	"The Paper-Mache Empress"; Transliteration: "Haribote Ōjo" (Japanese: ハリボテ皇女)	May 23, 2010
21	"The Shrine of Water"; Transliteration: "Mizu no Seidō" (Japanese: 水の聖堂)	May 30, 2010
22	"Trinity ・ Gehenna"; Transliteration: "Toriniti Gehena" (Japanese: トリニティ・ゲヘナ)	June 6, 2010
23	"The Deadly One, Sasha"; Transliteration: "Chimeisha Sāsha" (Japanese: 致命者サーシャ)	June 13, 2010
24	"Live Thy Life of Youth"; Transliteration: "Nanji, Seishun Suru Koto Nakare" (Japanese: 汝、青春することなかれ)	June 20, 2010

=== The Qwaser of Stigmata: Portrait of the Empress (OVA) ===
This OVA episode was originally released in Japan on a DVD that was included with Volume 10 of the manga.

No.	Title	Original release date
10.5	"Portrait of the Empress"; Transliteration: "Jotei no Shouzou?" (Japanese: 女帝の肖像)	October 20, 2010

This OVA episode is included on the North American DVD release of The Qwaser of Stigmata II, as episode 10.5. The action for this side story takes place around the time period of the middle of the first season.

=== The Qwaser of Stigmata II ===
No.	Title	Original release date
1	"Silver Princess of the Lilies"; Transliteration: "Giniro no Hyaku-gō Hime" (Japanese: 銀色の百合姫)	April 12, 2011
The episode starts out with Sasha on one of the girls from his class, after titles the scene changes to the church where he talks to Yuri Noda (The mysterious priest who works at the church in St. Mikhailov Academy, but also has connections to Athos.) and tells him that he has located the "Magdalene of Thunder". Sasha infiltrates the all-girls school disguised as a girl himself where he proceeds to make acquaintances with his fellow female classmates. As soon as Sasha and Hana return to their room Hana forces Sasha to wear women's underclothes. The next day he and his class go into a computerized virtual-reality simulator by using their mental potential. He then appears in the simulation as a well-endowed girl in a revealing attire. He is challenged to a duel by a strong classmate named Miyuki Seta whom he thinks is holder of the Magdalen of Thunder. The battle is won by Sasha and the loser has to obey the winners commands, so Sasha invites the loser over to his room and sucks on her soma only to find that she is not the one. The next day in class has classmates congratulate him on his victory. The scene cuts to the second apostle of the 12 Adepts, a silicon wielder named Wang-Chen as he appears in front of the school.
2	"The Location of the Magdalene"; Transliteration: "Magudara no Arika" (Japanese: 携香女の在処)	April 19, 2011
Tsubasa avenges the honor of the girls at the academy.
3	"The Quartz Trap"; Transliteration: "Hari no Wana" (Japanese: 玻璃の罠)	April 26, 2011
Elements collide in a battle that breaks out at the academy.
4	"Cage of Thorns"; Transliteration: "Ibara no Ori" (Japanese: 荊の檻)	May 3, 2011
Determined to save Tsubasa at all costs, Miyuki heads to the virtual world to do battle.
5	"Witch's Sacrifice"; Transliteration: "Majo no Ikenie" (Japanese: 魔女の生贄)	May 10, 2011
The silicate user harnesses the Magdalene of Thunder, will he be stopped?
6	"Reunion"; Transliteration: "Saikai" (Japanese: 再会)	May 17, 2011
The girls band together to make one last stand against the silicate user.
7	"Madame Lily's Breast Fortune-telling"; Transliteration: "Madamu Riryi no Oppai Uranai" (Japanese: マダム・リリィのおっぱい占い)	May 24, 2011
Personal information about the student body is being stolen and traded to creepy men.
8	"Beautiful Challenger"; Transliteration: "Utsukushiki Chōsensha" (Japanese: 美しき挑戦者)	May 31, 2011
After their return Sasha tries to reestablish himself at St. Mihailov Academy. Jita however has difficulties with getting along the rest of the school thinking that she's on enemy ground, and questioning the carefree attitude of her known foes, specially Sasha who is quick to provoke her, but with Tomo defending her as not being like the other Adepts. Miyuri invites everybody to a bowling contest in which both Sasha and Jita prove to be comically unskilled, as opposed to the class rep. Fumika who can successfully strike several times in a row. As part of her victory Sasha is to listen to anything she says, and while everybody thinks she's gonna confess her feelings for him, she from the embarrassment merely asks that Sasha gets along with everybody (namely in favor of Jita), which later prompts her to cry on Hana when she couldn't confess. The episode ends with Miyuri hugging the mysterious character named Edgar, who has found "Sasha the Martyr".
9	"Heart-pounding Foundation Festival"; Transliteration: "Doki☆Doki Sōritsu-sai" (Japanese: ドキ☆ドキ創立祭)	June 7, 2011
Students and townspeople gather at St. Mihailov Academy for an annual festival.
10	"The Qwaser of Stigmata"; Transliteration: "Hijirikon no Ku Eisa" (Japanese: 聖痕の☆くぇいさー)	June 14, 2011
Big Ma'am challenges Sasha to refrain from drinking Soma.
11	"A Night of The Communal Hot Spring 2 - I Was Surprised When I Sucked It -"; Transliteration: "Gantetsusen no Yoru" (Japanese: 含鉄泉の夜)	June 21, 2011
Big Ma'am trains the students to become stronger than the Adepts
12	"The Peace Ends and the Cogs of Destiny Begin to Turn"; Transliteration: "Heion wa Owari o Tsuge, Unmei no Haguruma wa Mawari Dasu" (Japanese: 平穏は終わりを告げ、運命の歯車は回りだす)	June 28, 2011
Dead set on getting the Noah of Gold, the Athos Punishment Enforcement Group Meteora creates a Nosferatu Worm to infect and control the girls in order to do their bidding.

== Theme songs ==
Song title	Lyrics Author	Composition Data	Performance Parameters
"Errand" (Season 1 - episodes 1–12, used in episode 24 as ending)	Aki Hata	Composed/arranged by Daisuke Kikuta (Elements Garden)	Sung by Faylan as First season Opening I
"Baptize" (Season 1 - episodes 13–24)	YUI	Composed/arranged by Daisuke Kikuta (Elements Garden)	Sung by Yōsei Teikoku as First season Opening II
"Passionate Squall" (Season 1 - episodes 1–4, 6–12)	Aki Hata	Composed/arranged by Tom-H@ck	Sung by Ayumi Fujimura, Aki Toyosaki, Minori Chihara, Aya Hirano, Yōko Hikasa, (anime role voices) as First season Ending I
"Mimei no Inori" (未明の祈り) (Dedicated solely to Episode 5 of Season 1)	Aki Hata	Composed by Satoru Takada and arranged by Katsuya Yoshida	Sung by Minori Chihara as First season Ending II
"Wishes Hypocrites" (Season 1 - episodes 13–23)	Aki Hata	Composed by Katsuya Yoshida and arranged by Satoru Takada	Sung by Ayumi Fujimura, Aki Toyosaki, Minori Chihara, Aya Hirano, Yōko Hikasa, (anime role voices) as First season Ending III
"Rasen, Arui wa Seinaru Yokubō" (Season 2 - episodes 1–12)			Sung by Faylan
"Metaphor" (メタファー) (Season 2 - episodes 1–12)		Composed by Pixelbee, RD-Sounds and arranged by Pixelbee	Sung by Shoujo byou, Aki Toyosaki as the Second season Ending

== See also ==
- List of The Qwaser of Stigmata characters
