= Berri, South Australia (disambiguation) =

Berri, South Australia is a town and locality in South Australia.

Berri, South Australia may also refer to.

- Berri Oval, a cricket oval in South Australia
- Berri Football Club, Australian rules club in South Australia
- District Council of Berri, former local government area in South Australia

== See also ==
- Berri (disambiguation)
