= Burri =

Burri is a surname. Notable people with the surname include:

- Alberto Burri (1915–1995), Italian abstract painter and sculptor
- Emil Burri (1902–1966), German playwright and screenwriter
- Franz Burri (1901–1987), Swiss political figure
- Hanspeter Burri (1963), Swiss footballer
- Olivier Burri (born 1963), Swiss rally driver
- Otto Burri (died 2015), Swiss rower
- René Burri (1933–2014), Swiss photographer
- René Burri (footballer) (born 1941), Swiss footballer
- Reto Burri (born 1976), Swiss footballer

== See also ==
- Buri (disambiguation)
- Burris (surname)
- Burry
