= BER =

BER may refer to:

== Science and technology ==
=== Biology and medicine ===
- Basal electrical rhythm, spontaneous rhythmic slow action potentials that some smooth muscles of the GI tract display
- Base excision repair, a DNA repair pathway
- Benign early repolarization, a heart arrhythmia
- Blossom end rot, a plant disorder

=== Computing ===
- Basic Encoding Rules, a set of rules for encoding data
- Bit error rate, the ratio between the number of incorrect bits transmitted to the total

== Places ==
- Bermuda (IOC and UNDP code), a British overseas territory
- Bohai Economic Rim, the economic region surrounding Tianjin, China

== Transport ==
- Air Berlin (ICAO code: BER), a defunct German airline
- Berlin Brandenburg Airport (IATA code: BER), Germany
- Berlin station (Connecticut) (Amtrak code: BER), United States

== Other uses ==
- Beyond economic repair, a rating of a damaged item
- Block Exemption Regulation, published by the European Commission regarding European Union competition law
- Building the Education Revolution, a 2010 Australian government economic stimulus programme
- Building Energy Rating, a rating label for the energy performance of a building in Ireland
- Chemische Berichte (Ber), a 1868–1945 German chemistry journal
- B.E.R., a band best known for their single "The Night Begins to Shine"

== See also ==
- Ber (disambiguation)
