= Ber (disambiguation) =

Ber is a tropical fruit tree species belonging to the family Rhamnaceae.

Ber may also refer to:

== Places ==
- Ber, Greece, Slavic name for Veria, Greece
- Ber, Mali, a village and commune

== Other uses ==
- Ber, one of the Kelvin functions in mathematics
- Berber languages (ISO 639-3: ber), a language family of Northern Africa
- Wer (god) or Ber, in Mesopotamia and ancient Syria
- "Ber" months, preceding Christmas in the Philippines
- Ber (name), a given name and a surname
- Ber (musician) (Berit Dybing, born 1998), American musician

== See also ==
- BER (disambiguation)
- Bear (disambiguation)
- Beer (disambiguation)
- Berr, a surname
- Le Ber, a surname
- Ber. (disambiguation)
