= Le Ber =

Le Ber is a Canadian surname. Notable people with the surname include:

- Claude Le Ber (1931–2016), French racing cyclist
- Jacques Le Ber (c. 1633–1706), Canadian soldier
- Jeanne Le Ber (1662–1714), famous Canadian recluse
- Pierre Le Ber (1669–1707), Canadian painter
