= Barrie (company) =

Scottish company

Barrie is a Scottish luxury company specialising in the production of cashmere collections. Founded in the Borders in 1903, Barrie was acquired by Chanel in 2012. A "Barrie" brand was launched in 2014.

== History ==
In 1903, Walter Barrie and Robert Kersel opened a factory specialised in the production of high-quality stockings. Located in Hawick, Barrie thus manufactured two-tone model designed by Gabrielle Chanel in the 1920s.

In 1962, the company took the name of Barrie Knitwear Ltd. In 1975, it moved to a new factory in Burnfoot specially designed for cashmere. Barrie started working for names in fashion such as Chanel, an activity that continues to this day.

In October 2012, Barrie Knitwear Ltd was acquired by Chanel.

Barrie presented its first own-label collection for fall-winter 2014–2015. Each collection is designed in the House of Barrie's design studio in Paris, and then produced in Hawick, Scotland.

In 2014, Barrie opened its first shop in Paris, followed by a second in London. Today, the brand is active in 22 countries.

== Scottish tradition ==
Knitting was an important activity in the Scottish isles in the 17th and 18th centuries. Families generally made sweaters, socks and accessories. Wool contains natural oils that offered fishermen essential protection as they went off to sea.

This activity was industrialized in 1771 with the arrival of four looms. In 1845, more than 2,000 of Scotland's 2,605 looms were located in the Scottish Borders, and the city of Hawick alone accounted for half of these.

== The Barrie brand ==
Since the brand inaugurated its Paris studio in 2014, four collections per year have been designed in the French capital. Sketches are sent to the workshop in Scotland, where the knitting machines are programmed according to the measurements and patterns of each garment.

Barrie offers pullovers, cardigans, skirts, dresses, trousers, overcoats, T-shirts, beanies, gloves, etc. Some Barrie clothing and accessories are recognizable thanks to iconic thistle knitted in 3D. This technique makes bold stylistic innovation possible, enhancing knitwear with simple or sophisticated relief textures using tone-on-tone or contrasting colors.

Buttons, manufactured by artisans such as the costume jeweler Desrues, Chanel's traditional supplier of buttons and accessories, are decorated or painted by hand to feature the Barrie logo in tone-on-tone porcelain.

With the announcement of its new artistic director, Augustin Dol-Maillot, Barrie begins a new chapter in its history with its Spring-Summer 2019 Collection.

== Transmission of expertise ==
The company established a training center in 2012 to help young people acquire the technical skills necessary to work for the company.
