= Berry (singer) =

- Also known as: Berry
- Born: Élise Pottier; 19 February 1978 (age 48); France
- Occupations: Singer, songwriter, musician
- Years active: 2008 – present

Élise Pottier, better known by her stage name Berry, is a French singer, originally a theatre actress. Her mother is the singer-songwriter Christine Authier.

Berry's first album, Mademoiselle, was released in 2008. The album reached No. 34 in France and No. 46 in Belgium. A second album titled "Les passagers" (The passengers) was released in 2012.

Berry also performed the vocals to "Comment te dire adieu" (French version of "It Hurts To Say Goodbye") on the Blank & Jones CD Relax Edition Six, which was released in 2011.

== Albums ==
=== 2008 : Mademoiselle ===
1. Mademoiselle
2. Le Bonheur
3. Las Vegas
4. Belle comme tout
5. Enfant de salaud
6. Love Affair
7. Plus loin
8. Demain
9. Inutile
10. Chéri
11. Les Heures bleues
12. Mon automobile (Hidden Title)
13. Nos équivoques (Deluxe Edition)
14. La chanson d'Hélène with Daniel Darc (Deluxe Edition)
15. Capri (Deluxe Edition)
16. La tendresse (Deluxe Edition)

=== 2012 : Les Passagers ===
1. Si souvent
2. Les passagers
3. Non ne le dis plus
4. Brune
5. Les mouchoirs blancs
6. Si c'est la vie
7. Like a river
8. Ce matin
9. Claquer dans les doigts
10. For ever
11. Partir léger
12. Voir du pays

== Acting ==
- 2006: Le juge est une femme ("The Judge Is a Woman", TV Series, 1 episode)
- 2004-2005: Les Cordier, juge et flic (TV Series, 3 episodes)
- 2003: Commissaire Moulin (TV Series, 1 episode)
