= Berrian Mountain =

Mountain in Colorado, United States

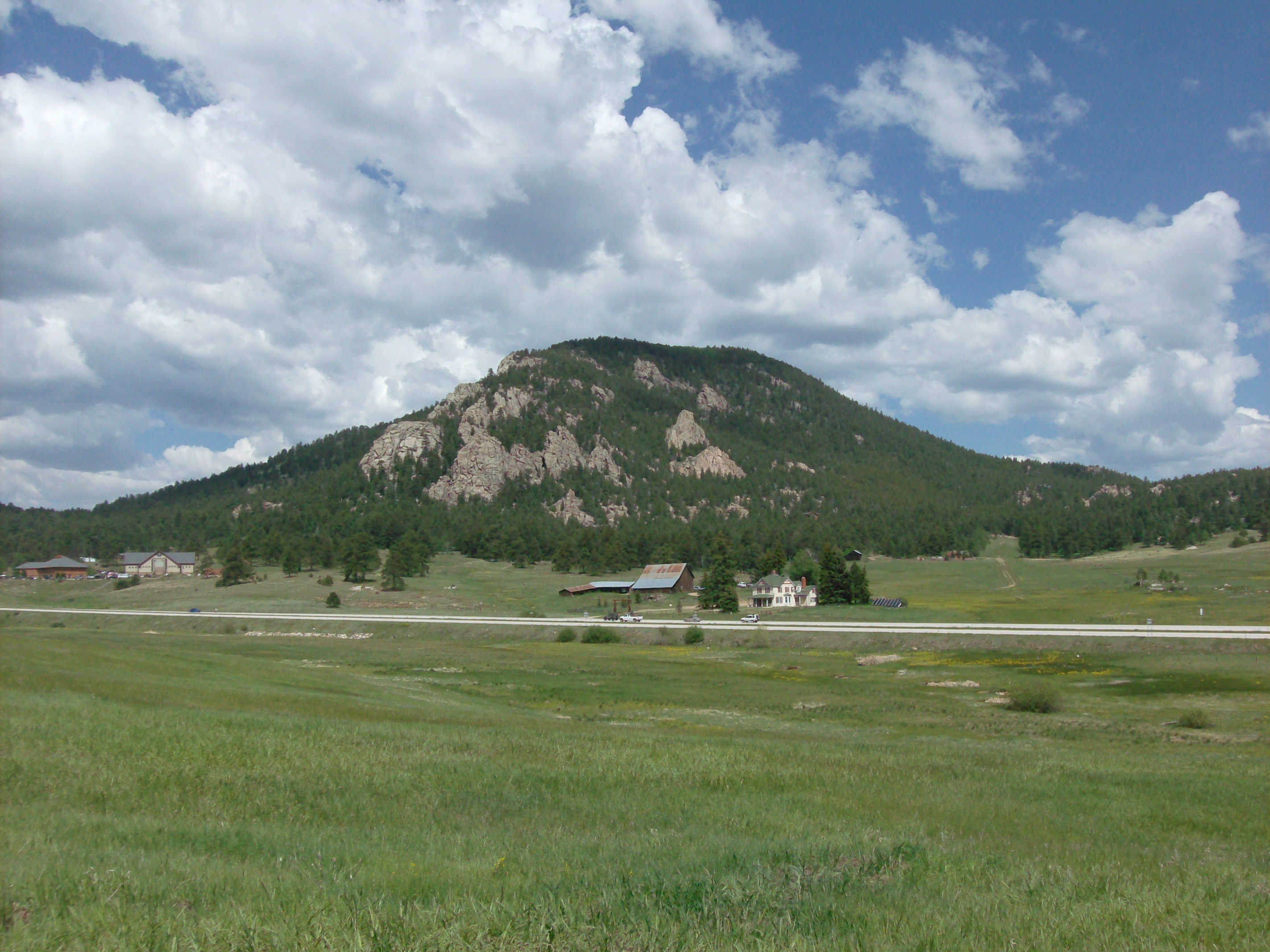
- Berrian Mountain seen from Meyer Ranch Park.

Highest point
- Elevation: 9,151 ft (2,789 m) (Note: The elevation of Berrian Mountain includes an adjustment of +1.163 m (+3.82 ft) from NGVD 29 to NAVD 88.)
- Prominence: 927 ft (283 m)
- Isolation: 4.90 mi (7.89 km)
- Coordinates: 39°33′18″N 105°17′32″W

Geography
- Location within Colorado
- Country: United States
- State: Colorado
- County: Jefferson
- Parent range: Front Range
- Topo map(s): USGS 7.5' topographic map Conifer, Colorado

Climbing
- First ascent: 1879
- Easiest route: North-western face across Denver Mountain Parks open space

Berrian Mountain is a mountain summit in the Front Range of the Rocky Mountains of North America. The 9,151-foot (2,789 m) peak is located 0.9 miles (1.5 km) north-northeast (bearing 17°) of the community of Aspen Park in Jefferson County, Colorado, United States.

== Mountain ==
According to Jefferson County Archives, Berrian Mountain was named after George, Dan, and Ray Berrian and the Berrian family who came from Kansas to Colorado in 1887. Previously, it may have been called McIntyre Mountain after Duncan McIntyre, who owned property on the east side of the mountain where Midway House is located.

== See also ==
- List of Colorado mountain ranges
- List of Colorado mountain summits
  - List of Colorado fourteeners
  - List of Colorado 4000 meter prominent summits
  - List of the most prominent summits of Colorado
- List of Colorado county high points
