= 2016 St. Joseph courthouse shooting =

Mass shooting in Michigan, U.S.

- Location: 42°6′36.4″N 86°28′38″W; St. Joseph, Michigan, United States
- Date: July 11, 2016; 10 years ago c. 2:25 p.m. (ET)
- Attack type: Mass shooting
- Deaths: 3 (including the perpetrator)
- Injuries: 2
- Perpetrator: Larry Darnell Gordon
- Motive: Attempted prison escape

On July 11, 2016, Larry Darnell Gordon, an inmate, opened fire on the third floor of the Berrien County Courthouse in St. Joseph, Michigan, United States, killing two bailiffs and injuring a sheriff's deputy. Gordon, who was facing a multitude of charges that carried a possible life sentence, was being taken to a holding cell following a courthouse hearing when he disarmed an officer and attempted to take hostages. Moments after taking hostages, other court officers shot and killed Gordon.

== Details ==
Prior to the shooting, Gordon was handcuffed and escorted by a deputy sheriff from the Berrien County Courthouse to a holding cell following the conclusion of a hearing. He was facing a multitude of charges. According to the county sheriff, Gordon had been handcuffed in front rather than behind his back, and the restraint was not linked to a belly chain that would further restrict movement.

In an escape attempt, Gordon attacked a deputy sheriff on the third floor of the courthouse, in an area not accessible to the public. He managed to disarm and shoot Deputy Atterbery once and two bailiffs, Security Supervisor Zangaro and Court Officer Robert Kienzle responding to the noise of the struggle. He then escaped into a public hallway, where he briefly took hostages when cornered by four other responding bailiffs (Ken Field, Milt Russell, Tom Schultz and Rick Lull). As Gordon moved toward an unsecured stairway he pointed the weapon in the direction of the bailiffs who then shot and killed him. In the course of stopping Gordon, a civilian (Kenya Ellis) was shot, receiving non-life-threatening wounds to her arm.

The assailant fired a total of six shots, thus emptying the revolver, meanwhile the two responding bailiffs fired a combined total of 13 shots.

== Victims ==
Gordon killed two bailiffs. He also injured sheriff's deputy James Atterbury Jr. The injured were hospitalized at Lakeland Medical Center and listed in stable condition. Both slain bailiffs were retired police officers.

The bailiffs killed were identified as:

- Joseph Zangaro, 61, the courthouse security director who had been with the department since 2004 after having retired from the Michigan State Police after 25 years.
- Ron Kienzle, 63, an Army veteran who had been with the department since 2005 after having retired from the Benton Township Police Department after 20 years.

== Perpetrator ==
Larry Darnell Gordon (October 11, 1971 – July 11, 2016) was a resident of Coloma, Michigan. In April, he was charged with six counts of first-degree criminal sexual conduct; three counts of sexual child abuse; two counts each of assault with a dangerous weapon, assault by strangulation, and resisting or obstructing police; and one count each of drug possession, kidnapping, and unlawful imprisonment. According to police, these charges were filed after it was discovered that Gordon had entered into a year-long sexual relationship with a 16-year-old girl in October 2015, started making sex videos of her, and locked her in a shed on one occasion. He faced a possible life sentence for the charges.

According to the girl, Gordon would forcibly give her methamphetamine in exchange for sex, occasionally rape her, strangle her, and assault her with a variety of weapons, all the while recording the acts. She also alleged that Gordon held her captive inside the shed for approximately two months. Police were now investigating his possible connection to a similar crime in 2006.

In addition to the aforementioned charges, Gordon faced two other charges of aggravated domestic assault and assault with a dangerous weapon, in relation to an incident involving his ex-wife. On April 20, following a police welfare check on the couple's home in January, Gordon was arrested on an outstanding warrant filed in relation to those charges. During the arrest, he barricaded himself inside the house and later escaped through a back door. He was found hiding under a porch several streets away by a police dog. Later, police discovered the teenage girl inside a shed on Gordon's property, along with drugs, related paraphernalia, weapons, and other items. On the day of the shooting, Gordon was scheduled to be in court to have the warrant dismissed due to the charges involving the teenage girl.

Previously, in 1992, Gordon was sentenced to 70 months in federal prison for possessing pipe bombs. In 1998, he was sentenced to more than four years in state prison for eluding police officers. In 2001, he served 51 months in federal prison for firearms charges. In 2013, Gordon was put on probation for stealing fireworks from a temporary stand.

== Aftermath ==
The Berrien County Courthouse closed on July 12 and increased its security as a result of the shooting. A makeshift memorial was set up near the Berrien County Sheriff's Department. The Berrien County Sheriff's Department pledged to review its guidelines for transporting suspects of violent crimes, while judges across Michigan were asked to review the security plans of courthouses.

Funeral proceedings for Zangaro and Kienzle were scheduled for July 15 and July 18, respectively.

=== Reactions ===
Governor Rick Snyder traveled to the courthouse the evening of July 11 for a press conference, during which he stated, "This is a particularly tough time for law enforcement. This is a terrible event to have happen, and we need to rally together."

U.S. Representative Fred Upton, who is a St. Joseph native, released a statement saying, "What occurred today in my hometown breaks my heart. My thoughts are with our entire community — our friends and neighbors. One thing is clear: we must do better to prevent these types of tragedies from occurring."

== See also ==
- List of homicides in Michigan
- Brian Nichols
- Tyler courthouse shooting
- Gun violence in the United States
- List of American police officers killed in the line of duty
- List of killings by law enforcement officers in the United States
