= Barrie (band) =

American indie rock band

Barrie is an American indie rock band fronted by Barrie Lindsay.

== History ==
In 2019, the band released their first album titled Happy to be Here. In 2022, the band released their second album titled Barbara. In 2023, the band released an EP titled 5K.

== Band members ==
- Barrie Lindsay (vocals)
- Dominic Apa (drums)
- Spurge Carter (keys)
- Sabine Holler (bass)
- Noah Prebish (guitar, synth)
