= List of The Qwaser of Stigmata characters =

The following is a list of characters from The Qwaser of Stigmata series of stories that were published in the Japanese manga Champion Red. The characters also appear in the anime series The Qwaser of Stigmata, The Qwaser of Stigmata II, and an OVA episode The Qwaser of Stigmata: Portrait of the Empress all derived from the manga series.

== Main characters ==
=== Athos ===
Alexander "Sasha" Nikolaevich Hell (アレクサンドル＝ニコラエビッチ＝ヘル, Arekusandoru Nikoraebicchi Heru; ru: Александр Николаевич Хэлл)
Voiced by: Junko Minagawa (drama CD), Yūko Sanpei (anime)

Also known as Sasha (サーシャ, Sāsha; ru: Саша). He is the main protagonist. Tomo literally stumbles over the Russian born Alexander during her home commute with Mafuyu after a particularly difficult school day. After Mafuyu and Tomo nurse him back to health, Alexander wastes no time demonstrating his powers as a Qwaser with the element of Iron as he stalemates and eventually vanquishes the Magnesium Qwaser with such capabilities as forming an enormous black scythe that is at least twice his size along with vibrating the atoms in the iron to generate the immense heat necessary to forge alloys of iron without the need for an external blast furnace. Besides the hostile heretic Qwasers whose neutralization Athos charges him, Alexander is very austere with anyone that decides on her own to refer to him as »Sasha« and has a difficult time adhering to the social mechanics of Japanese society much to Mafuyu's frustration in the early going.
Sasha's primary vendetta with the Adepts is the murder of Olja (オーリャ, Ōrya; Оля) at the hands of the Aurum (Gold) Qwaser who exiled him with a large scar on the left side of his face shaped like an inverted Eastern Cross that tends to bleed in response to Sasha's excitement during battle -- the acme of which characterized by Sasha's left eye becoming red and the scar glowing prior to bleeding heavily during power-down. Driven by his bitter prologue with the Adepts and the parallels that he sees between Tomo and Olja, Sasha's ferocity reaches its zenith when the Adepts target Tomo for her high-quality soma; during his time with Mafuyu, Sasha comes to realize the infinite value of human life as he demonstrates a copious contempt for the Adepts endangering innocent people. Aside from the comedy of refracting Miyuri's persecution to her detriment and the situational remarks in Russian (though the translation is so-so and the pronunciation is very poor), Sasha is shocked to find that Mafuyu gives as good as she gets when he obdurately ignores the social conventions of human civilization and forces him to partake her consummate cooking -- particularly when it is his favorite dish borscht.
Over the course of the series, Sasha's arsenal expands from his trademark scythe and kunai to a katana-like sword he wields in tandem; even though he rejects the prospect in the early going, Sasha and Mafuyu begin to become attracted to each other even as they deny it when confronted about the prospect. He was involved in the most serious confrontations that happened in the series, the last one being the one against Shin'ichiro Ōtori, where he managed to reach the 4th (on a scale of eight) grade of elemental control. Nevertheless, despite realizing that he is in love with Mafuyu, Sasha leaves her side to train himself in order to confront the Golden Tyrant, not only for the sake of avenging his guardian, but to stop his plans.

Ekaterina Kurae (エカテリーナ＝クラエ, Ekaterīna Kurae; ru: Екатерина Кураэ)
Voiced by: Ui Miyazaki (drama CD), Aya Hirano (anime)
Also known as Katja (カーチャ, Kācha; ru: Катя). Reeling from a particularly harsh riposte from Sasha as he again rejects her overtures, Miyuri drags Hana along in her scheme to wield the newly arrived Ekaterina as a means of restoring social homeostasis with Mafuyu unaware that Ekaterina is merely being an authentic actress to secure herself a readily available supply of soma to fuel her copper-based powers as a Qwaser that are usually manifested through her extremely versatile gynoid guardian Anastasia that has the capability to channel electricity, concurrently constrain multiple assailants, manhandle adversaries physiologically impossible for a human being, and create copper objects from scratch.
When not constricting and cleaving apart her adversaries, the ten-year-old Russian-born Ekaterina devotes her energies to visiting unto her Maria Magdalen partner Hana Katsuragi several BDSM activities along with the age-appropriate activities expected of young children. Perhaps because of the following she has in the student body of the St. Mihailov Elementary School of being their queen due to her doll-like features and childish demeanor, Ekaterina has also taken to attempting to subjugate her fellow comrade-in-arms Sasha who she almost defeated when the two Qwasers first met.
One interesting fact about Ekaterina is that she is often hinted to have deep connections with the late Tsar Nicholas II of Russia and his family, the last monarch of Russia, and in fact, it was hinted briefly that she herself could be related to the imperial princess Anastasia and Tsar's wife, Tsaritsa Alexandra Feodorovna, or that she could in fact be the late Tsarita herself. It was later revealed that she has no relations to the late Tsar's family and that her grandmother who had dementia told her this after her mother had abandoned her.

Elizabeth (エリザベス, Erisabesu)
Voiced by: Ai Shimizu
Assisting her master Shin'ichiro Ōtori with nursing Mafuyu back to health after literally plunging into their lives, the tomboyish Elizabeth, nicknamed Lizzie, quickly bonds with Mafuyu because the two are orphans that engage in boy activities such as kendo and swordplay -- the latter case being how Elizabeth wields her titanium-based powers as a Qwaser. As the helium-wielding Adept disciple Qwasers are shocked to learn, Elizabeth primarily wields a massive double-handed greatsword she calls Excalibur whose every swing paralyzes her enemies with an acoustic disturbance prior to cleaving right through them. Ignoring the fact that she devours beef stew with the same zeal, Elizabeth loves to make fun of Sasha's affinity for borscht along with his Russian origins as a "northern savage".
This rivalry and her loyalty to Shin'ichiro drives Elizabeth to prosecute a duel with Sasha in order to buy time for Shin'ichiro's plan to draw the Aurum (Gold) Qwaser out of hiding. Shin'ichiro's final instruction for Elizabeth prior to his suicide is to fight alongside Athos with Teresa as her Maria Magdalen partner. Because her titanium sword becomes quite brittle after sustaining multiple hits, she will sometimes combine her power with other Qwasers' to make stronger titanium alloys.

Tasuku Fujiomi (藤臣 弼, Fujiomi Taisuku)
Voiced by: Kazuyuki Okitsu
A Japanese boy with a wild look and an aggressive personality, not to mention something of a womanizer, he confronted Sasha soon after his appearance, revealing himself to be a powerful Qwaser, whose abilities initially surprised Sasha, as Tasuku apparently had his same powers, though he managed to use them better. He is indeed a Qwaser, but his element is neodymium, which allows him to control any kind of metal through magnetism, not by interacting to it at the molecular level. He is also very skilled in Buddhist incantations, as he is the sole heir of a family of sorcerers and shamans, and thus can create elaborate incantations or even Buddhist-related weapons.
His explosive personality and his occasional foolishness harbor a dark secret however: as a child he was greatly traumatized when his mother was brutally raped in front of him, which led him to become mad with ideas of revenge and turn to a life of constant conflict, slowly drifting to senseless anger. His encounter with Mutsumi Sendou saved him, and the two became inseparable since then. Though initially antagonistic, Tasuku quickly became a valuable ally, though he was accused of raping Hana and had to fight Ekaterina, when Friederich Tanner pitted the two against each other. When angered, he fights with a murderous frenzy that makes him attack with blind fury, especially if it's Mutsumi who's in danger.

Shinichiro Ōtori (鳳 榊一郎, Ōtori Shin'ichirō)
Voiced by: Tōru Ōkawa
As the helium-wielding Qwaser triplets are shocked to have demonstrated, Shin'ichiro's prowess with his sodium based powers as a Qwaser is an experience that burns itself to memory as all the possible applications are brutal and indefensible; in addition to combustion at the atomic level, Shin'ichiro's molecular filaments have the capability to hack into the neural network of another living creature to force the quarry to think and perform the way he wants through the potassium-sodium electron conveyance. For reasons obscure and arcane that possibly include guilt, Shin'ichiro abandoned his role of the Aurum (Gold) Qwaser's right-hand man after Olja's murder and Sasha's scarring to unsuccessfully challenge his former master.
Undaunted by this setback, Shin'ichiro takes Elizabeth on as his protege and intercedes for Mafuyu in the hopes that she will lead him to St. Mihailov's Academy. The gambit paid off when Shin'ichiro discerns the meaning of the Theotokos along with the procedure to avail the icon's activation incantation which requires Tomo and Teresa as his aide along with plenty of time for the procedure to prosecute its full course. In spite of Elizabeth's inhibitory efforts, Sasha arrives on the scene to rescue Tomo as the Sword's Maria incantation divides itself between Tomo and Mafuyu; having nothing to show for his subterfuge to reach or seal away the Theotokos after purposely losing to Sasha, Shin'ichiro ignites the sodium in his body after bidding farewell to Elizabeth.

=== Human students ===
Mafuyu Oribe (織部 まふゆ, Oribe Mafuyu)
Voiced by: Hitomi Nabatame (drama CD), Ayumi Fujimura (anime)
Mafuyu is the main female protagonist character and the adopted daughter of St. Mihailov's last dean, and the self-appointed protector of Tomo Yamanobe. Cheerful and upbeat, she is so proficient in kendo that she carries a wooden sword with her all the time. She has to endure hardship on a daily basis in form of her and Tomo being ridiculed by other classmates. This changes when she encounters Sasha for the first time, when she starts living with him and, little by little, is pitted herself in the fights between Qwasers.
Though at odds with Sasha's coldness, Mafuyu has started to open up to him and the two have formed a stronger bond. This is especially true as she has recently taken on the habit of feeding Soma to Sasha when in need, and it is shown at the end of the first season that they have feelings for each other. After recent events she is the current holder of half the Sword's Maria, a powerful incantation which was kept hidden in a Fabergé egg. The power she gained are still unclear, though apparently they at least boost her physical prowess enough to let her challenge low-level Qwasers head-on. Also, in the latest chapters, She has decided to separate from Sasha to train to become his Maria and also train to use her "Sword of Maria" power. Mafuyu is in love with Sasha.

Tomo Yamanobe (山辺 燈, Yamanobe Tomo)
Voiced by: Kaori Nazuka (drama CD), Aki Toyosaki (anime)
Daughter of St. Mihailov's last dean and currently best friend/roommate of Mafuyu Oribe, Tomo is her exact opposite, both physically and mentally: she herself is very childish and naïve, and while having the largest bust of the whole female cast so far, she is physically weak. Tomo is the spitting image of Sasha's original protector, Olja, which explains why he took so willingly the role of Tomo's guardian, much to Mafuyu's dismay. Also, sometimes an upside down Eastern Cross (with its third slab being a scar), the symbol of the Adepts, appears between her breasts.
This is later revealed to be the presence of the Qwaser of Gold, which apparently inhabits Tomo's body as a disembodied projection and, as itself stated, is slowly draining her of her life, which is why she has to constantly replenish herself with Soma. Indeed, it was revealed that the Qwaser of Gold does have some control over Tomo, as he/she possessed her and tried to unseal Sword's Maria. The plan backfired however, and now Tomo is apparently free from his/her control and possess the other half of the incantation, with Mafuyu possessing the first. She then gets a attacked by the athos who want her powers along with her partner Sasha Martyr to open the gate to god.

Teresa Beria (テレサ＝ベリア, Teresa-Beria; Тереза Берия)
Voiced by: Minori Chihara
A Serbian Orthodox nun that serves at St. Mihailov in a variety of ordinary chores, such as taking care of children in the school's kindergarten or tending to flowers, she is notable in that, for most of the beginning of the series, she never shows any form of emotion, reacting with fright only when Mafuyu was about to close a door on her. This is explained when her past is revealed: as a child she was part of a Serbian Orthodox convent in Krajina, during the Yugoslav Wars, a jovial and hyperactive girl until the day a group of Croatian militiamen, led by "Gas Chamber" Croa, assaulted the convent and pillaged it, slaughtering and raping its occupants in a bloody carnage.
The sole survivor, Teresa observed the whole massacre from inside a closet, and when later found, she was so shocked that her emotions were locked away by the trauma. Only when Sasha gave her his support and they both avenged the slaughter by killing Croa, did she manage to smile for the first time in years. Teresa used to offer her Soma to Sasha, but since Ōtori's death she partners with Elizabeth. While an ordinary human, Teresa is well-versed in combat, using a bow for long-range attacks or fighting bare-handed, or using blades concealed in her gown. A running gag involves two curious locks of hair that she has on her head, which look and behave like a puppy's ears, flipping when she is happy or excited, dropping loose when she is embarrassed, and so on. In episode 22 of the anime's first season, Teresa might be hinted for having feelings for Sasha.

Hana Katsuragi (桂木 華, Katsuragi Hana)
Voiced by: Ai Shimizu (drama CD), Yōko Hikasa (anime)
A student of class 1-A, she acts as an enforcer on school grounds, but also she is the main architect of the physical abuses that Mafuyu and Tomo have to endure every day, such as regularly throwing the class' garbage can on them or forcing them to fill it after "casually" tripping on it, to covering Tomo's desk with writings and trash. As Miyuri's braws, she encountered Ekaterina shortly after her arrival in Japan, and feels embarrassed by how much she's obsessing over Ekaterina. Ekaterina picking up on this pretends to be vulnerable and unconscious in the dressing room they're in after using her power on the copper wiring to plunge the room into darkness. Hana succumbs to temptation and kissed Ekaterina on the arm who then restores the power and verbally abuses and blackmails Hana into serving as her Maria.
Although as additional abuse says that Hana is more of a Mary Magdelene (who was another Mary mentioned in the Bible who is believed by some to have been a prostitute.) This made her Ekaterina's personal slave and reserve of Soma, and from then on she had to endure daily abuse and sexual torture by her malicious mistress, abuse that she apparently enjoys to a degree and that gave her amazing BDSM-related skills. Unfortunately for her, this relationship with Ekaterina meant that she was often exploited by the enemy, as it happened with Yuu Kuchiba, who abducted her and drained her of Soma to the point of exhaustion, or with Friederich Tanner, who mind controlled her in order to pit Tasuku and Ekaterina against each other. Currently she is training with Sasha to improve herself as a partner to Ekaterina. In the sixth episode of the second season, Hana takes the Magdalen of Thunder from Tsubasa and becomes its holder similar to how Mafuya is the (partial) holder of the Sword's Maria. In the ninth episode of the second season she demonstrated the ability of flight and unleash great charges of electricity.

Miyuri Tsujidō (辻堂 美由梨, Tsujidō Miyuri)
Voiced by: Ryōka Yuzuki (drama CD), Ayako Kawasumi (anime)
The daughter of the current dean at St. Mihailov Academy, who succeeded Tomo's father. While beautiful and well-endowed, Miyuri is extremely bossy, arrogant and prideful, making nothing to conceal her disrespect for Tomo and Mafuyu and to bully them on a daily basis, supported by Hana. Greatly humiliated by Sasha, who correctly defines her as a leecher of others' powers, she "takes revenge" by welcoming and taking care of Ekaterina Kurae, the Qwaser of Copper. It can be noted that Miyuri is very rich and appears to have a sheltered upbringing, based on her drowning Ekaterina with expensive gifts. However, being treated as a fool after Sasha's arrival made her somewhat of a comic relief character.
On a positive note, it can be assumed that she truly cares even for those she bullies, as she stripped naked for a group of terrorists so as to spare the same ordeal to Ekaterina, Mafuyu and the others. She briefly enjoyed Qwaser-like powers, donning a magical girl-like outfit and wreaking havoc before being stopped by Tasuku Fujiomi and becoming normal once more.

Fumika Mitarai (御手洗 史伽, Mitarai Fumika)
Voiced by: Kana Hanazawa
Fumika is the class president of Mafuyu and Tomo's class. She is very withdrawn, due to her lack of breast size. When Eva Silver and Q and R come to St. Mihilaov Academy, Fumika stands up to Eva Silver and injures her, cutting her cheek. She is nearly cut to pieces as a result by an attack, but is saved by Alexander. She appears later bemoaning her breast size.

Mutsumi Sendou (仙道 六実, Sendou Mutsumi)
Voiced by: Nami Kurokawa
Former partner of Sasha and currently both partner and lover of Tasuku Fujiomi, Mutsumi is an upbeat, cheerful and well-endowed girl who rarely lets her inhibitions restrain her - for instance, she is bisexual and openly flirts with Mafuyu, much to her dismay. She encountered Tasuku shortly after Sasha left Athos, nursing him back to health and winning his trust and, with that, his love, which she reciprocates. Like Tasuku, she lives formerly at Seiganji High School with her different uniform as St-Mikhailov Academy. Similarly to Teresa her primary role is to provide Soma to her partner, though she can defend herself using a pair of bladed tonfa.

Miyuki Seta (瀬田 みゆき, Seta Miyuki)
Voiced by: Harumi Sakurai
The head of the Sorority, a group of elite students who (according to Ayame Satsuki) surpass the student council in terms of influence, at Roman Curia Surei Academy. Miyuki is one of the top students at the school and much revered by others throughout the school for both academic and athletic knowledge. She challenges Sasha to a duel on his first day at the school within the school's virtual training system as on suspicion that he might be the culprit behind the series of sexual harassment happening in the school but is instead defeated.
As a result, Sasha tastes her Soma and subsequently determines that she is not the Magdalena of Thunder. She is extremely close and dedicated to her childhood friend Tsubasa, to the point that their attachment to each other appears romantic, though she has also been shown to become fascinated by Sasha. She carries what appears to be a knight's chess piece in silver, and is able to project a symbol onto her chest that transforms into what appears to be cybernetic body armor. After realizing Tsubasa is held captive by Wan Chen, Qwaser of Silicon, she ends up assisting Sasha in battling the Adept.
In the anime, after Wan Chen's death, Miyuki and Tsubasa are able to live as normal students and become a couple. In the manga, Miyuki remains beside the comatose Tsubasa, waiting hopefully for her to wake up.

Tsubasa Amano (天乃 翼, Amano Tsubasa)
Voiced by: Yoshino Nanjō
Tsubasa is a student in the class of Hana and Alexander during their undercover days at Roman Curia Surei Academy and is in fact the granddaughter of the school's former chairman. In the real world, Tsubasa uses a wheelchair due to an accident within the virtual world her grandfather created (which presumably led to the virtual training system used by the school). As physical injuries appear meaningless within the virtual training environment, however, she is formidable in that environment. Tsubasa loves books and is timid, though in the virtual world she is a lot more cheerful and talkative.
In the manga she gets bullied by her classmates though she is not burdened while this, meanwhile in the anime she is admired by her classmates and there is no bullying. Tsubasa and her childhood friend Miyuki Seta share a close relationship, one that can be described as romantic. Hana takes advantage of Tsubasa passing out in the school bath so Alexander can taste her Soma and see if she is the Magdalena of Thunder. Alexander determines that she is not, a conclusion that turns out to be incorrect- she is kidnapped by the Qwaser of Silicon and held against her will to awaken an old program that her grandfather designed that can further Wan's goal of controlling all computers worldwide.
In the anime, Hana ends up taking the power of the Magdalen of Thunder from Tsubasa, making her a normal girl and enabling her and Miyuki to live together happily as a couple. In the manga, Wan Chen forcibly severs connection between her body and the virtual environment where her consciousness is located, a process thought to have killed her but instead only leaves her in a state of coma, leading people (especially Miyuki) to believe that she managed to escape as well and will eventually re-awake.

Ayame Satsuki (皐月 あやめ, Satsuki Ayame)
Voiced by: Yuiko Tatsumi
Another member of the sorority of Roman Curia Surei Academy. Ayame is obsessed with Miyuki and always calls her "onee-sama". When Miyuki is defeated by Alexander, Ayame takes it upon herself to avenge Miyuki, but instead gets her Soma sucked by Alexander. She follows the way of Hana in that she is obsessed with yuri and lolicon. When Ekaterina arrives at the Academy, she makes Ayame her slave as well in addition to Hana.

Lulu Shiizaki (椎崎 ルル, Shiizaki Ruru)
Voiced by: Satomi Akesaka

Edgar (エドガー, Edogā)

Voiced by: Kaoru Mizuhara

An androgynus boy who appears after the events in Roman Curia Surei Academy. He befriended and follows Miyuri everywhere mostly when she tries to use any foretelling technique that involves using her breasts. Edgar is shown to be the one to truly foresee the events Miyuri predicts. He knows that Sasha is a Qwaser from Athos. Previously he was a slave of Frederich Tanner, and was constantly abused by him into constructing The Noah of Gold on his body. He is later stated by the Meteors as "The Golden Woman" speculating he may have a tie to the Gold Qwaser. It turns out his personality is fake/virtual to serve as a vessel for Frederich Tanner during the assault at the Water Sanctuary and died.

== Antagonists ==
=== The Adepts ===
A secret group of thirteen Qwasers who, much like Athos, desire to uncover the Theotokos, though apparently to use its powers for their own ends. They were introduced as a cult-like organization best known for its extreme brutality and harsh ways to initiate new members, willing or not, to their cause. Sasha was part of their ranks before being wounded and banished by the Qwaser of Gold, who appears to be the sect's leader. However, recent chapters have revealed the group to be far less sinister, showing them to be respectable — albeit still sinister - people. They entered a truce with Athos since they currently hold Tomo Yamanobe captive, and thus half of the incantation necessary to unseal the Theotokos.

Subsidiary to the Adepts appears to be a secretive organization known as Paracelsus, formed from the remnants of Japan's Unit 731 and the Nazi eugenics program, whose members, through demented medical science, can conquer feats deemed impossible and blasphemous, such as reviving the dead and cloning at will. Their base appears to be a secluded place named Magnolia, the ruins of a fortress splendidly decorate by lush gardens, which stands in stark contrast with the grim portrait of the organization.

However, the Golden Tyrant, with a few others, betrayed and forsaken the Adepts to Athos, stating they're no longer necessary for the next step. The surviving Adepts are Aoi, Jita and Joshua.

The Golden Tyrant
The Leader of the Adepts, he was the one who killed Sasha's guardian, Olya, and gave Sasha his scar. Had a golden spike placed on Tomo to serve as a means of communication to Sasha and his fellow Adepts. His identity was a mystery during the entire series until Sasha confirms that he is new leader of the Catholic Church, Pope Gregory XVII, who manages to end the schism with the Orthodox Church after centuries of separation.

After his betrayal, he manipulates Jita and Joshua (along with a few bio-terrorists) is make a scene where he prevents a virus attack and displays a miracle. This act wins himself the position of Pope and states his dream to reunite the Roman Catholic Church and Eastern Orthodox Church. He also currently runs the Theosis Project to resurrect Jesus Christ to bring forth his final judgment. He was disappointed in Jita as he gave her multiple chances to kill him when she wasn't aware of it. Also, according to Frederick Tanner, Sasha is always on his mind. It is revealed that his true and actual identity is Judas Iscariot, one of the twelve disciples of Jesus Christ who betrayed his master. In order to continue to serve Jesus upon his return, Judas fuse his soul with the souls of his fellow Apostles and encased it in a humanoid golem of gold shaped like an archangel. His Gold powers allow him to perform unusual skills, such as the Golden Spike to control Tomo's body and use the vibrations of gold flakes to destroy a deadly virus.

Wan Chen
Voiced by: Kenji Hamada
Second of the Adepts, known as Ground Zero, a Qwaser in control of Silicon. He can generate crystal/glass for use as a sword or directly pull silicon from soil in his vicinity and make a perfect clone of himself. He's also able to fuse his own power with other elements, like Jita's Carbon, resulting in Silicon Carbide materialized as a sword whose hardness equals that of diamond.
As silicon is a primary component in computer chips this allows him to use his powers to directly access and control the computer that contains the school's advanced Virtual Reality program, usually through silicon tendrils between his body and a computer interface. He had a terrible history which led him to believe the world was already hell and wished to live tomorrow peacefully as a human being. However, despite his beliefs, he was finally killed by Sasha for all the trouble he caused in his "Witchcraft project".

Aoi Kuchiba (朽葉 葵, Kuchiba Aoi) & Yū Kuchiba (朽葉 悠, Kuchiba Yū)

Both: Voiced by: Risa Hayamizu

Third member of the Adepts, nicknamed Double Face or Air Lord or Lady of the Rustling Leaves in anime, a single person which was originally two twins, brother and sister. It is unknown what life they lived before being captured by the Adepts, but they had to endure their harsh trainings by themselves, with Aoi supporting Yū, much like how Olja had to help Sasha. Unfortunately, this connection resulted in their damnation, and Yū became a homicidal maniac as a result. Not only that, but he also became a massively powerful Qwaser with the element, oxygen, which allowed him to walk in the air with impunity, create pressures of enormous proportions, air currents capable of large destruction and more devious acts, such as suffocating anyone he wished with no more than a thought or incapacitating them by saturating their surroundings with oxygen.
His sister, Aoi, contacted Sasha and begged him to kill Yū and stop his rampage, though initially both him and Ekaterina were no match for someone who could oxidize their metal with a whim, rendering them powerless. However, when Sasha fought him for one last time it was revealed that there was no Yū, as he died long ago, it was Aoi all the time: deemed unfit for combat as a Qwaser, the Adepts wanted to use her as a supply of Soma, and when she was about to be assaulted, she unleashed her powers in self-defense, slaughtering her assailant only to discover, to her horror, that it was her brother. The event shattered her mind and drove her to complete madness, forcing the creation of a split personality of anger and hatred that took the identity of Yū, plaguing her with fits of rage and hallucinations of her brother raping her.
Devastated by the revelation, with the last of her sanity she begged to be killed, a plea Sasha mercifully accepted. Though seriously wounded, Aoi did not die, and thanks to Paracelsus' efforts she was saved, with the procedure also sealing her identity of Yū away, reducing it as a "voice in her head".

Milk/Blanc
Fourth of the Adepts, nicknamed Whisper Bomb. She is a young girl, as young as Ekaterina probably, who appears dressed in a regal gown but, oddly, has her face always concealed by a gas mask and, even more oddly, is often surrounded by cartoonish explosives, such as bombs, missiles, and torpedoes. She never spoke since her introduction, but it is known that her element is hydrogen, as she combined her powers with Aoi Kuchiba, who wields oxygen, to manipulate water and reveal the concealed sanctuary of the Theotokos. She is actually an old friend of Ekaterina, whom was sworn to be protected by and her puppy Baron. However, after an accident with a bully, her puppy was killed and her face scarred, and an explosive caused Ekaterina to believe that she was dead. She can use water vibrations to have a clairvoyance-like ability to see what is going on in nearby locations.

During the Golden Tyrant's betrayal, Milk was revealed to be a regen (clone body for Blanc's soul) as part of a process to resurrect Jesus Christ.

Sanada Doukan
5th of the Adepts Hierarchy. Also known as "Thousand Kills". He appears to be a "very" large man with a sword. He is a Tungsten user and strong enough to withstand tank shells. When he was found, he killed a small army just to protect a bird's nest in a tree. At that time, Astarte developed a connection with him and he sworn true allegiance to her, becoming an Adept. He fought Sasha during the siege at the Adept's hideout. Sasha KO'ed him and tied him to a boulder, right after stating that Sasha was a worthy warrior.

After the Golden Tyrant's betrayal was revealed, he overhears Astarte's danger and charges to her rescue. Unable to find her, he attacks Ootomi's clone for his part of the betrayal but was burned to death by powers. His final request to Sasha was for Astarte's protection which Sasha accepted.

Croa (クロア, Kuroa)
Voiced by: Masuo Amada
Possibly 7th in the Adept Hierarchy. Known as Gas Chamber, he is a tall, wicked-looking member of the Adepts, and as a Qwaser he wields the element of chlorine, with which he can create noxious and lethal gases or, in conjunction with water, generate hydrochloric acid. He was the one that led the vengeful militiamen to Teresa's convent during the Yugoslav Wars, and appears to be highly xenophobic, often lamenting that his prey smell really bad. He threatened to turn St. Mihailov in a massive grave by gassing all its occupants before Sasha fought and defeated him. A clone of him, reanimated and controlled by Friederich Tanner, was used to force the awakening of Sword's Maria by fighting Ōtori before suffering defeat.

Ayana Minase (水瀬 文奈, Minase Ayana)
Voiced by: Ayahi Takagaki
A bespectacled classmate of Tomo and Mafuyu, Ayana appears to be one of the only students of class 1-A willing to take their side despite them being bullied or ignored while mistreated, though she feared to stand with them due to possible retaliation by Miyuri and the other students. Although she appears to be a weak-willed and timid student, she was one of the Adepts, the first Qwaser introduced in the manga with her element being magnesium, with which she created razor-sharp chakrams or chains that she could ignite and control at will. Ayana terrorized St. Mihailov's premises as a mysterious assailant that targeted girls and drained their Soma, often leaving them severely injured, before trying in vain to find where the Theotokos was held.
Confronted by Sasha, she tried once more to find the icon by kidnapping Tomo, and in the ensuing fight she was mortally wounded by Sasha. She burnt herself instead of succumbing to the wounds, giving a first impression of the Adepts' fanatic zeal. Unexpectedly she re-appeared as a reanimated corpse when Friederich Tanner summoned her and other fallen Qwasers to fight Shin'ichiro Ōtori, against whom she was easily dispatched and burnt once more, this time apparently for good. Her nickname as an Adept in manga is unknown but in the anime Sasha called her Miss Choreographer. In the manga it is speculated she never really treated or even considered Tomo and Mafuyu her friends.

Eva Silver (エヴァ＝シルバー, Eva-Shirubā)
Voiced by: Yū Asakawa
The Queen of the Living Silver, controlling the element mercury, able to summon it in vast quantities and solidify it at will, turning the substance into razor-sharp wires and blades, droplets as powerful as bullets, and other solid objects or even traps. While Sasha and Ekaterina were fighting Eva-Q and Eva-R, the real Eva Silver appeared out of nowhere in Mafuyu's class, killing their teacher by smothering him with mercury and then proceeding to "teach" the class about the beauty of cruelty and humiliation upon others, ironically also reprimanding the students about their bullying of Mafuyu.
One of the most sadistic and deranged characters appeared so far, Eva was the original source of all of her clones, younger versions of herself who were given physical immortality so as to endure the atrocious tortures imposed on them by their mistress, whom they adored as their only queen and were then massacred and reabsorbed into Eva's body, so as to keep her young and beautiful. Highly prideful, Eva was initially defeated by Sasha, when she was crucified and set ablaze, yet she reappeared shortly after, gruesomely disfigured, kidnapping Mafuyu and forcing Sasha to fight once more. It was Ekaterina who shed light upon Eva's identity, unmasking her as Eva Braun, the wife-lover of Nazi dictator Adolf Hitler.
Believing her acts of depravity, especially cloning and reassimilating herself, as the true manifestation of the Nazi idea of a supreme being, she was defeated nonetheless, and completely torn apart by Ekaterina's gynoid, in the end revealing herself to be fearful of death. A cloned corpse of Eva Silver was later used in the botched attempt, made by the Qwaser of Gold and Friederich Tanner, to summon Sword's Maria. Her position in the Adepts' hierarchy is unknown.

Friederich Tanner
Voiced by: Ken Narita
Older of the Tanner brothers, he is a blonde man of aristocratic Prussian descent who, while not being a Qwaser himself, holds strange powers akin to sorcery that lets him create many seals and incantations that allows him to assume others' identities, hypnotize and force others into doing his bidding, or to summon and teleport others at will using tarot cards. Nicknamed Double-Headed Crest Maker, he is an international terrorist much feared across Europe, who believes the current state of that continent to be miserable and uses terror to destabilize the European Community, in order to lead it to collapse, striving to revive the Holy Roman Empire with Germany at its lead. He sought the Theotokos for such an end, using both Athos and the Adepts as mere pawns in a game he orchestrated from the shadows, until he appeared to end it personally, first disguising himself as a teacher at St. Mihailov, and then trying to finally unseal the sanctuary where the Theotokos was hidden, using Mafuyu and a crest-infused Hana to reunite the two halves of Sword's Maria.
He almost succeeded, however he was defeated and then killed when Sasha, Ekaterina and Tasuku combined their efforts to stop him. However, he returns alive and well and seemingly rats out the Adept's Hideout to the Meteors and helping Hayabusa capture Astrate. He is still on the Golden Tyrant's side, along with Ootomi's clone, after his betrayal and exposes the Golden Tyrant's true goal, which will require the "David of Resurrection". Sasha made his trump card, "Gate of Hell: Uroboros", turn against him and devour him, finally ending him. His final words to Sasha was that Sasha was always on the Golden Tyrant's mind.

Georg Tanner
Voiced by: Koji Yusa
Younger brother of Friederich Tanner, known as Gamma Omega, he is eighth in the Adepts' hierarchy and he can control both cobalt and gamma rays, creating destructive laser-like beams from an elaborate ornament he has on his right hand, which he constantly cleans and admires. He is highly narcissistic and arrogant, boasting his aristocratic origins with pride and treating others as inferior beings. He shares the same beliefs as his older brother Friederich, hoping like him to destabilize Europe and bring back the Holy Roman Empire, led by his native Germany. He has an especially bitter rivalry with Jita Phrygianos and her brother, considering them unworthy to be Adepts, and almost had her killed after provoking her into a fight, forcing her to take the blame. When his brother attempted to unseal the Theotokos, he was to defend him from Sasha, Ekaterina and Tasuku, aided by Aoi Kuchiba and Milk.
The fight proved to be too much for him however, and he had his face greatly disfigured by Sasha's scythe before being almost burnt when the three Qwasers united their efforts to stop Friederich. Severely wounded, he was dragged from the battlefield by Aoi. He later reappeared during a tournament to encounter Sasha, only to be killed by him.

Jita Phrygianos
Voiced by: Fuyuka Oura
Eleventh of the Adepts, known as Black Diamond, she is Joshua's sister, whom she treats as a fool. Her element is carbon, from which she can create bladed weapons; either form it as a pair of crescent-like scythe or fiber thread; at will. She was initially very harsh towards Tomo, addressing her as a loose woman due to her good looks, though she apparently developed a crush on her, slowly opening up, especially after Tomo saved her when Georg Tanner forced her to take the blame of a fight he had provoked. She joins Wan Chen in his attempt to take the Magdalena of Thunder and was thought dead after performing a suicide attack to kill Katja in the virtual world along herself.
However, she survived and was retrieved by Athos, who fitted her with a special lock on her left breast that causes her excruciating pain should she feel either excessive pleasure or use her powers. Though uneasy at being well-treated by her "enemies," she has begun to open to the people at St. Mihailov. After the Golden Tyrant's Betrayal, she was released from captivity with her brother, but used by the Golden Tyrant in a scheme become the next Pope.

Jackal (ジャッカル, Jakkaru)
Possibly 12th of the Adept's Hierarchy. Known as "One Shot Kill". An expert marksman wielding element of plumbum/lead. Appeared shortly in an attempt to assassinate Sasha when he temporary lost his powers but failed in his assassination attempt and was killed as well when Sasha managed to regain his powers.

Joshua Phrygianos (ジョシュア＝フリギアノス, Joshua-Firigianosu; Τζοσουα Φρυγιανος)
Voiced by: Masaya Matsukaze
the 13th of the Adepts hierarchy and known as "the Eleventh Exile", and a true rarity among them, serving somehow as the faction's comic relief character. A young man whose sister, Jita, is ranked number four in the organization, he was mistreated by his peers due to his element, roentgenium, being weak and useless, which led others to treat him as inferior, someone unfit to be a Qwaser. He boasts himself with the title of Successor of Hermes Trismegistus, though he is in fact generous and caring, if somehow foolish sometimes.
He tried in vain to kidnap Tomo, who peacefully succeeded in making him realize his mistake, and then he was the first one to welcome her to the Adept's hideout. He appears after the events at Roman Curia Surei Academy during the ongoing war of Athos with The Meteors. He is attacked by Katja, but shockingly he not only renders Katja's attack useless but manifests the crest of the Golden Qwaser, implying he has earned his powers. He claims he wants to take back his sister. However, this crest backfires as The Qwaser of Gold deems him disposable and Sasha saves him by cutting off his arm. After the Golden Tyrant's Betrayal, his arm was restored and released from captivity with his sister, but used by the Golden Tyrant in a scheme become the next Pope.

Others:

Astarte (アスタルテ, Asutarute)
Voiced by: Mai Goto

A little girl with blonde hair and blue eyes that serves an important role among the Adepts. She has been in the Adepts' secret hideout for most of her life, not even leaving once from the castle. She has implied that her most important person is her dog, Serene. Doukan is the one who takes care of her and a sisterly bond with Tomo.

After the Golden Tyrant's betrayal, she and Tomo were taken to the Theosis Project's underwater base, Uterus, and was having her soma drained out of her, much to Tomo's horror.

Shin'ichiro Ōtori's Clone
A clone of the original Shin'ichiro Ōtori with the same sodium powers, but his body can use his powers so much. Faithfully serves the Adept's cause, but was on the Golden Tyrant's side of his betrayal.

The Helium Brothers
A trio of brothers who control the element of Helium.

Eva-Q (エヴァ＝Q（クー）, Eva-Kū) & Eva-R (エヴァ＝R（エル）, Eva-Eru)

Eva-Q: Voiced by: Mai Nakahara Eva-R: Voiced by: Yukari Tamura

A pair of deranged, ghastly twin sisters dressed in scandalous, bondage-looking suits and armed with a wide variety of obscene BDSM tools, which suddenly appeared at St. Mihailov, searching for Sasha, begging those they asked informations to "order" them - that is, to torture them to death with the array of gadgets they carried, with refusal immediately followed by "disqualification", the gruesome death of their would-be master. Probably the most extreme example of the brutality of the Adepts, Eva-Q and Eva-R were clones of their original, Eva Silver, engineered to be physically immortal, no matter how massive their injuries, capable of using the element mercury like their mistress, and also completely crazy, driven by constant rape and torture to such extremes of insanity that they recognized pain with pleasure, crying out in bliss even when superficially wounded. They like Evas A-P, were created from Eva Silver's own body with mercury for two reasons.
The first reason was to provide loyal slaves for Eva to send on errands or torture just for fun. The second reason was so Eva Silver could heal any injuries and regain her youth by reabsorbing them. Possibly due to their pitiful condition, Sasha fought them only briefly, leaving the job to Ekaterina, who was much more eager to kill the twins. She only managed to keep them at bay however, until their "mother", Eva Silver, was wounded by Sasha and reabsorbed them back into herself to heal the massive damage inflicted upon her body. Another clone, Eva-S, briefly appeared when Eva kidnapped Mafuyu, though she was quickly incinerated from the inside-out by Shin'ichiro Ōtori, who ignited the sodium in her body and, thus, prevented her from regenerating.

Rostam
A teenage servant who attends to Tomo's well-being at the Adept's hideout. Has a crush on her. During the siege on the Adept's Hideout, he escorted Tomo and Astrate through a hidden escape tunnel, only to be stabbed from behind by Hayabusa. His final words was apologizing to Tomo for failing her.

== Meteors ==
The Meteors are a troop of executioners of Athos, known for their might and ruthlessness, according to Sasha they destroy everything that stands in their way. The Meteors have their vision of Athos and believe the current organization to not be enough to save the world, thus taking matters in their own hands. Their main officers was called "Five Faculties"

Clifford C.J. Crawford
Number 1 of the "Five Faculties" and head priest of the Meteors. A middle-aged man with shoulder-length hair and literally no ears - claiming to have been sacrificed to God and claims to be an extraordinary pleasure.
Leon Max Muller
Number 2 of the "Five Faculties" and known as "The Blind Wolf", a young man that Mafuyu meet as a renaissance village, to which he slaughter the whole village after Mafuyu left, deeming them as heretics. He believes what the Meteor does is God's will and anyone that goes against them are deemed heretics. Appears to have his eyes covered with a blindfold. He has a large number of wolves that obey his command, which also can transform into werewolf-like beasts. He also is able to transform sharks into mutant merman. He was last seen with an agent of the Theosis Project, meaning that the Meteors are allied with the Golden Tyrant.
Lee May
Known as "Silent Magnum" and number 3 of "Five Faculties", as the alias implies, she use all kind of firearms against her opponent. She originally came from a noble family that was killed during an international meeting. She was found by rogue soldiers who put her through brutal training and tried to impregnate her, only to find that they were also working for Fredrick Tanner, that one behind her family's massacre. After killing the soldiers, the Meteors found her and recruited her. She waited for the opportunity to kill Fredrick, esp. when he was in a student named Edgar (virtual personality) who carries the Golden Noah. At the Water Sanctuary, She sacrifices herself to stop Fredrick and save Sasha (based on a recent dream produced from the Golden Noah that the two were in love).
Nami Okiura
Voiced by: Sayuri Yahagi
Number 4 of "Five Faculties" and bearer the alias "Plunger" Also known as Frantic Nami and one of the Meteors' main officers, she is a girl who is part of the student council at St. Mihailov, who enjoys working in the council. This is a facade however, as when instructed to act, she violently assaults the president whom she claims to love. She behaves and has abilities akin to a vampire. By biting the breasts, of her preys she can infect them with a virus which allows her to command her victims. In the anime, she successfully did this with Mafuyu and almost kills Sasha were not for the timely arrival of Teresa. She is killed by Sasha.
Hayabusa
Another member whose skilled with blades and uses a shadow technique to become invisible, along with other ninjutsu skills. He likes to keep introductions brief and "Business before pleasure". Likes to have his opponents afraid, confused, etc. Pursued Astrate, along with Tomo, during the siege at the Adepts hideout. Apparently loves to torment women before killing them. Killed by Aoi.

== The Theosis Project ==
The special project run by the Golden Tyrant in attempt to resurrect Jesus Christ. Their Current base of operations, where Tomo is being held, is an underwater facility around ancient Roman ruins called "Uterus" - where its members say it will the "Birthplace for the New Humanity". The idea is to use the "David of Resurrection", which acts as a special scanner, to scan the essence of Jesus Christ, which lies within the "Theotokos of Tsaritsyn", and place the essence in a clone body.

Members:

The Golden Tyrant/Pope Gregory XVII
See Adepts

Melosz
The Golden Tyrants's partner and second in command in the Theosis project poses as Tomo's and Mafuyu's father (if it is truly him). He bears a huge scar over his face and has a prosthetic left arm and leg. He is also known to be an underworld negotiator and fixer.

Urada Oikawa (及川 麗, Oikawa Urara)
Voiced by: Sayaka Ohara

See other characters

Shinichiro Ōtori's Clone
See Adepts

Frederick Tanner
See Adepts

Yū Kuchiba Clone
He was revived with a clone body, much like Milk, and bears his own "two" elements. His main element is Aluminum, which he can create blades with, and also has Thermite, a process where he can convert his aluminum to have explosive features. This was achieved by the fact that his body was actually cloned from Aoi's DNA, resulting in his soul residing in a copy of her female body. As a result, he is able to utilise his naturally born element of Aluminium in conjuncture with Aoi's element of Oxygen. He is still the same sadistic psycho as he was first shown.

Lucrezia Borgia
A seductive and alluring woman who is a sulfur user. She was sent to try to bring the Golden Tyrant's old master to join the cause. But because of Mafuyu's, Aoi's, and a friend's interference, she vowed to kill them all for it. She once used her sulfur powers to activate an underwater volcano.

Giorgio Charon and Goryou
A tag team duo. Goryou is the muscle and Giorgio is a handsome Italian ladies man (he once tried to flirt with Tomo as her refers to her as a princess/royalty and mother superior with god-like soma).

== Other characters ==
Yuri Noda (ユーリ＝野田, Yuri Noda)
Voiced by: Susumu Chiba
Urada Oikawa (及川 麗, Oikawa Urara)
Voiced by: Sayaka Ohara
The School nurse who works at the academy, she has connections with Athos and is aware of the movements of the Qwasers. She treats the students of the academy and sometimes helps them with their personal problems. It is later revealed she is part of the Theosis Project, but is protective of Tomo as she didn't want her to see what was happening to Astrate.
Yumie Hiiragi (柊 弓枝, Hiiragi Yumie)
Voiced by: Rina Satō
St. Mihailov's student council president.
Big Ma'am (ビッグ マム, Biggu Mamu)
Voiced by: Kimiko Saitou

The strongest tactician of the Athos. She is a strong muscled woman who wears a nun uniform. She has a military attitude and is harsh in her methods, but despite this she has the best intentions.

Yamanobe Yuudai
Voiced by: Atsushi Ono

The father of Tomo and foster father of Mafuyu. The Previous dean at the school who disappeared. By ch. 63, he appears to be alive with his own agenda, such as hoping the Golden Noah becomes lost forever. Also, he currently holds the true "Theotokos of Tsaritsyn".

== See also ==
- List of The Qwaser of Stigmata episodes
