= Oporelu =

- Commune
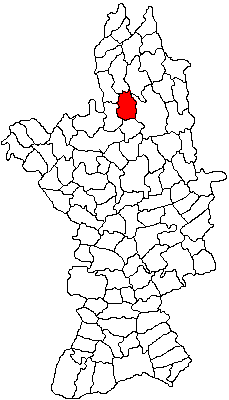
- Location in Olt County

- Location in Romania
- Coordinates: 44°36′N 24°25′E
- Country: Romania
- County: Olt
- Population (2021-12-01): 1,015
- Time zone: EET/EEST (UTC+2/+3)
- Vehicle reg.: OT

Oporelu is a commune in Olt County, Muntenia, Romania. It is composed of four villages: Beria de Jos, Beria de Sus, Oporelu and Rădești.
