= Berry Fen =

Neutral grassland in Earith, England

Coordinates: 52.351°N 0.022°E

- Site of Special Scientific Interest
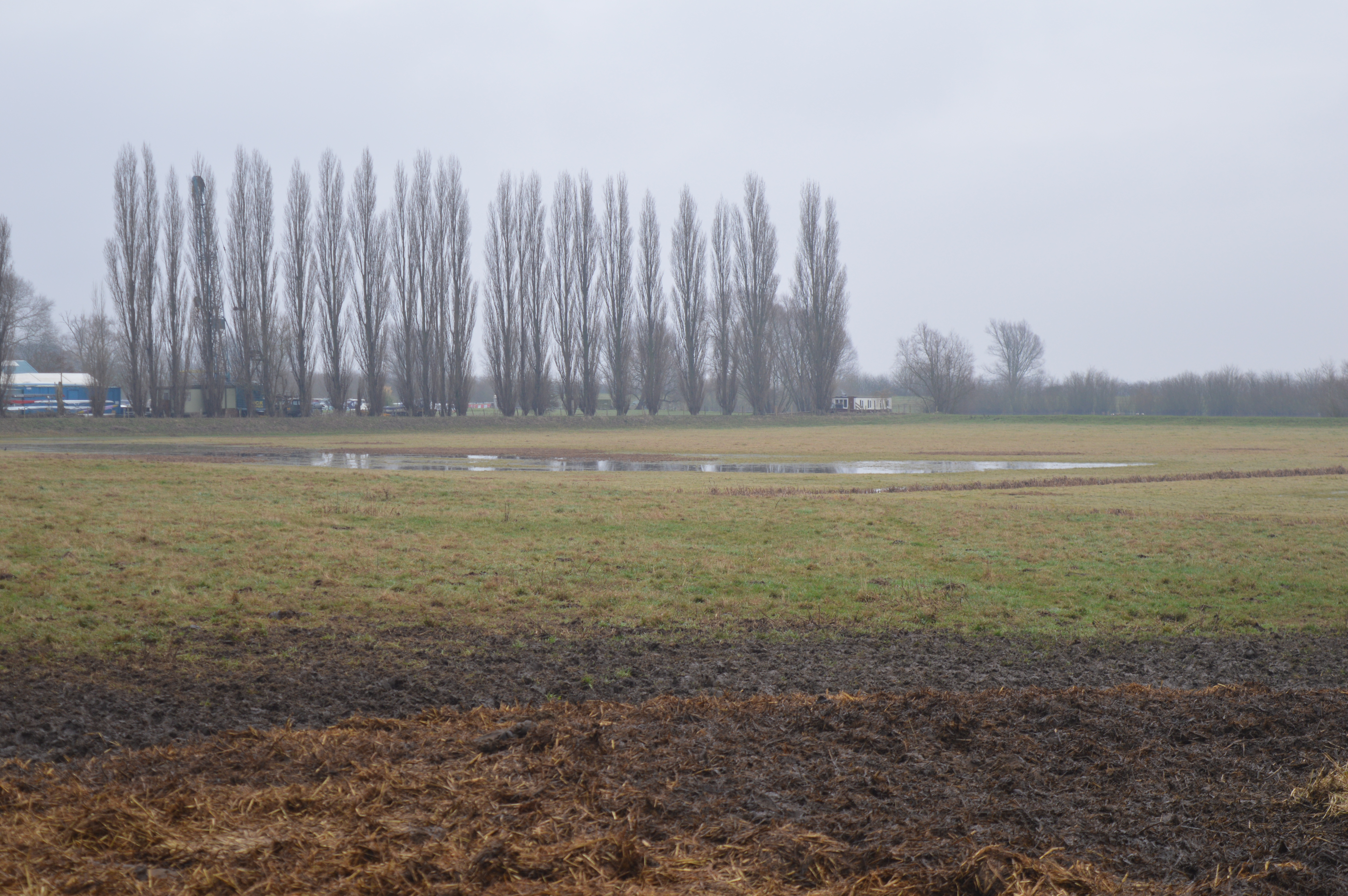
- Location of Berry Fen.
- Area of search: Cambridgeshire
- Grid reference: TL 378 745
- Interest: Biological
- Area: 15.3 hectares
- Notification date: 1984
- Location map: Magic Map

Berry Fen is a 15.3-hectare (38-acre) biological Site of Special Scientific Interest on the western outskirts of Earith in Cambridgeshire.

This neutral grassland periodically floods in the winter. It is used by wintering wildfowl, including Bewick's swans in nationally significant numbers, especially when the nearby Ouse Washes flood too deeply. There are wetland herbs such as marsh ragwort, and the rare narrow-leaved water-dropwort.

The site is private land with no public access.
