= Berrien (surname) =

Berrien is a French surname. Notable people with the surname include:

- Chauncey L. Berrien (1879–1932), American football player and coach
- Frank Berrien (1877–1951), American football coach
- Jacqueline A. Berrien (1961–2015), American lawyer
- John Berrien (1711–1772), American judge
- John Berrien (major) (1759–1815), American military officer
- John M. Berrien (1781–1856), American senator and Attorney General
- Lucille Berrien (1928–2026), American political activist
- Skip Berrien, American politician
