= HMS Berry =

Frigate of the Royal Navy

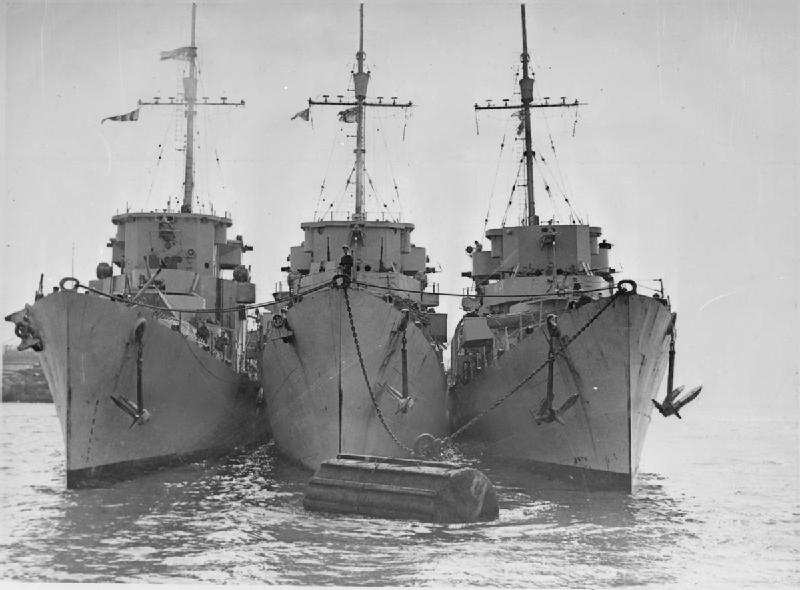
- Berry on the left

History

United Kingdom
- Name: HMS Berry
- Builder: Boston Navy Yard, Boston, Massachusetts
- Laid down: 22 September 1942
- Launched: 23 November 1942
- Commissioned: 15 March 1943
- Stricken: 12 March 1946
- Fate: Returned to the USN, 2 February 1946; Sold for scrapping, 9 November 1946

General characteristics
- Type: Captain-class frigate
- Displacement: 1,190 long tons (1,210 t) (standard)
- Length: 289 ft 5 in (88.2 m)
- Beam: 35 ft 2 in (10.7 m)
- Draught: 10 ft 1 in (3.1 m)
- Installed power: 6,000 shp (4,500 kW) electric motors
- Propulsion: 2 shafts; 4 diesel engines
- Speed: 20 knots (37 km/h; 23 mph)
- Range: 6,000 nmi (11,000 km; 6,900 mi) at 12 knots (22 km/h; 14 mph)
- Complement: 198
- Sensors & processing systems: SA & SL type radars; Type 144 series Asdic; MF Direction Finding; HF Direction Finding
- Armament: 3 × single 3 in (76 mm)/50 Mk 22 guns; 1 × twin Bofors 40 mm; 9 × single 20 mm Oerlikon guns; 1 × Hedgehog anti-submarine mortar; 2 × Depth charge rails and four throwers

HMS Berry (K312) was a Captain-class frigate, built in the United States as a Evarts-class destroyer escort, and transferred to the Royal Navy under the terms of Lend-Lease, which served in the Second World War. She was named after Rear Admiral Sir Edward Berry.

== Description ==
The Evarts-class ships had an overall length of 289 feet 5 inches (88.2 m), a beam of 35 feet 2 inches (10.7 m), and a draught of 10 feet 1 inch (3.1 m) at full load. They displaced 1,190 long tons (1,210 t) at (standard) and 1,416 long tons (1,439 t) at full load. The ships had a diesel–electric powertrain derived from a submarine propulsion system with four General Motors 16-cylinder diesel engines providing power to four General Electric electric generators which sent electricity to four 1,500-shaft-horsepower (1,100 kW) General Electric electric motors which drove the two propeller shafts. The destroyer escorts had enough power give them a speed of 20 knots (37 km/h; 23 mph) and enough fuel oil to give them a range of 6,000 nautical miles (11,000 km; 6,900 mi) at 12 knots (22 km/h; 14 mph). Their crew consisted of 198 officers and ratings.

The armament of the Evarts-class ships in British service consisted of three single mounts for 50-caliber 3-inch (76 mm)/50 Mk 22 dual-purpose guns; one superfiring pair forward of the bridge and the third gun aft of the superstructure. Anti-aircraft defence was intended to consisted of a twin-gun mount for 40-millimetre (1.6 in) Bofors anti-aircraft (AA) guns atop the rear superstructure with nine 20-millimetre (0.8 in) Oerlikon AA guns located on the superstructure, but production shortages meant that that not all guns were fitted, or that additional Oerlikons replaced the Bofors guns. A Mark 10 Hedgehog anti-submarine mortar was positioned just behind the forward gun. The ships were also equipped with two depth charge rails at the stern and four "K-gun" depth charge throwers.

== Construction and career ==
The name Berry was originally assigned to the Evarts-class destroyer escort, BDE-14, laid down on 28 February 1942. When that ship was retained by the United States Navy and renamed Doherty (DE-14), the name was transferred to another ship. The new Berry (BDE-3) was laid down on 22 September 1942 by the Boston Navy Yard, launched on 23 November 1942, and commissioned into the Royal Navy on 15 March 1943.

During World War II, HMS Berry operated in the Atlantic Ocean and the Bay of Biscay in 1943 and 1944. After the war, Berry was returned to the U.S. Navy at the Philadelphia Naval Shipyard on 2 February 1946. Her name was struck from the Navy list on 12 March 1946, and she was sold to the North American Smelting Co. That firm took possession of her on 9 November 1946 and completed her scrapping on 4 November 1948.
