= Mount Berry =

Mount Berry may refer to:

- Mount Berry, Georgia, an unincorporated town in the United States
- Mount Berry (Antarctica), a mountain in Antarctica
- Berry Peak, highest point of Wrangel Island

== See also ==
- Mount Berry Mall, Rome, Georgia, United States
