= Berrien's Island =

Coordinates: 40.785°N 73.899°W

Berrien's Island was an island in the East River in New York City, off the northern shore of Astoria in Queens. It takes its name from Cornelius Jansen Berrien, who purchased it from Timothy Wood in 1727. During the 20th century, Berrien's Island became connected to the larger Long Island, on which most of Queens is situated. The site is now occupied by a Consolidated Edison plant.

== History ==
Throughout its history, a variety of people owned and possibly maintained the island. During the summer of 1849, there was a cholera epidemic that swept through New York City and killed thousands of people. In order to locate and purchase a new cemetery, a man named Marcellus Eells acted as the city's buyer and purchased Berrien's Island for $20,000 and then sold it for a sum of $30,000 to the Special Committee headed by George F. Clarke. During the winter of that same year, some of the city's citizens, led by Leonard Kirby, became concerned and sued the New York City for conflict of interest and illegal expenditures in the purchase of Berrien's Island. The Plaintiffs won the case and Berrien's Island was never used for a pauper's cemetery.

In 1890, Berrien's Island was purchased by the Manhattan Athletic Club. Although the reason is currently unknown, it can be speculated that it was purchased for the purpose of training basketball players with disabilities. According to a flyer in the Ephemera-Basketball Game Flyers'College Point A.C. vs. Tremont Basketball Team. 23 December 1914(?), a basketball game was held at Muehlenbrink's Hall on December 23, 1914: the team from Tremont was composed of Deaf Mutes from the New York Institute for the Deaf and Dumb.

During the 20th century the island became connected to Queens when water between Long Island and Berrien Island was land filled. The area in which the land was filled was in the northern part of Astoria, where Con Ed is located. In addition, part of the Berrien property is now where Steinway Co. is located.

== Geography ==
There were 23 acres of land to be used immediately, which were separated from the Berrien farm by a channel of about 150 feet. The formation of Berrien's Island is somewhat singular, being a belt averaging in width at about 200 feet on top. The top was composed of high, dry sand and gravel interspersed with large boulder stones nearly surrounding the natural basin; the high lands rose about 40 feet above the tide water. The high lands on the northeasterly were almost entirely a bed of sand and gravel rising abruptly from the water to an elevation of about 32 feet and the level then rose to an elevation of 40 feet above tide water. The high lands then fell off a gradual slope in the north to the basin on/ in the center of the island.

According to a complaint issued in Document No. 6: Board of Assistant Aldermen, September 24th, 1849. Berrien's Island Supreme Court Case Records (B-19), John V.B. Varick Records (V-8), Waters Family Papers CW-13 Document Case Box 489h, Folder 20 Complain. 1850. Berrien's Island Supreme Court Case Records, 1849-1851 at the Queens Central Library, Berrien's Island had fallen within the County's jurisdiction (the County of New York's line of boundary on the North, across the East river into Flushing Bay). The island is also a half-mile from Astoria than the present location at Randall's Island. Berrien's Island is also as closer to Harlem as it was to Astoria: Berrien's Island is 2 miles distant from Astoria and Harlem.

== Use ==
In a letter to George F. Clarke from Edwin Smith, in the Queens Library's Berrien's Island Supreme Court Case Records, 1849-1851, the writer (Smith) wrote that he was called upon by Blake and his Committee to examine and observe on the relative advantage of using both Riker's and Berrien's Islands for a city cemetery. He proceeded on Thursday November 11 of 1849, in the company with D.S. Geer, the resident physician, and Mr. Marcellus Eells, who volunteered his boat to be used for the occasion to make the necessary examinations of the Island(s) and collect such information in relation to the limited time granted to them. Berrien's Island and farm, according observations, altogether contain about 47 acres of land.

In his letter, Edwin Smith stated 4 reasons in which the Berrien Island was considered the most appropriate location in which to construct and hold a cemetery: (1) The soil was a dryer and looser formation and the lands were used to a higher elevation above the tides; (2) The natural basin of it should be deemed expeditious after being drained could be used as a cemetery without excavation below the present surface by depositing the remaining therein and covering them with the earth from the surrounding high lands thereby grading the island; (3) The location being well over the southerly side of the sound and the cemetery being most offensive during the warm summer months. When southerly winds mostly prevail it could not so much affect the neighboring country/county as is located on the other island; (4) It is not so directly in the view of travel through the sound.

In addition, the Special Committee listed previously visited Berrien's Island and farm property in 1850. According to the report, the island was situated in Flushing Bay, away from the City improvements and it is farther away from the five other locations which were also under consideration. According to Google Maps and the information recently provided, it would appear that the Island is somewhere near or off the coast of where LaGuardia Airport is located.

Furthermore, Mr. Smith the surveyor and Mr. Geer the Health Commissioner showed how this ground could be adapted to meet the desired purposes.

In the document Document No. 6: Board of Assistant Aldermen, September 24th, 1849, the writer believed that this island was the place in which "the dead can rest in peace until the end of time, undisturbed by the approach of improvement, or the busy sound of commerce, and until it shall please the all-wise Creator to call them from their last earthly resting place".

== Correspondences and complaints ==
In a complaint document, Special Committee members Edmund Griffin and Charles Crane (or The Committee) had examined several locations, one of which, from the remoteness of inhabitants, convenience of access, and nature of soil, would be suitable for a public cemetery. Of the six selected areas, Berrien's Island seemed the more likely choice. People from Astoria had objected to his location: however, the objections were not valid and contained no reasonable foundation for such opposition except the desire of one Astorian individual to purchase the island for himself. However, as discussed previously, Berrien's Island had fallen within the jurisdiction of the County of the State of New York.

On September 15, 1849, a Special Term was held at New York City Hall regarding how the defendants showed cause. The reason for this was to determine why an Injunction Order was not granted pursuant to the claim and demand of the said complaint. The defendants were Mayor Alderman and the Commonalty of the City of New York. The Commonalty included George Clark, Robert J. Haws, Moses W. J. Jackson, and others. Under virtue of one or both Resolutions issued by the Common Council of New York, these men were instructed and restrained from appropriating, expending, or paying out any money of the City of New York for the purpose of purchasing Berrien's Island and the farm at Newtown, Queens County, owned by Ezra Berrien.
