= Herron Berrian =

Liberian football player

Personal information
- Full name: Herron Scarla Berrian
- Date of birth: 31 July 1994 (age 32)
- Place of birth: Monrovia, Liberia
- Height: 1.79 m (5 ft 10 1/2 in)
- Position: Forward

Senior career*
Years	Team	Apps	(Gls)
2012–2013	Free State Stars	6	(3)
2013–2015	Platanias	16	(9)
2014	→ Kerkyra (loan)	19	(11)
2015	→ Olympiacos Volos (loan)	10	(6)
2015–	Panserraikos	19	(11)

International career^{‡}
2012–	Liberia	12	(9)
- * Club domestic league appearances and goals as of 9 June 2015 ‡ National team caps and goals as of 7 January 2015

Herron Berrian (born 31 December 1994) is a Liberian football player who plays as an attacking midfielder for Panserraikos and the Liberia national team.
