= The Burryman =

Annual ceremony custom in Scotland

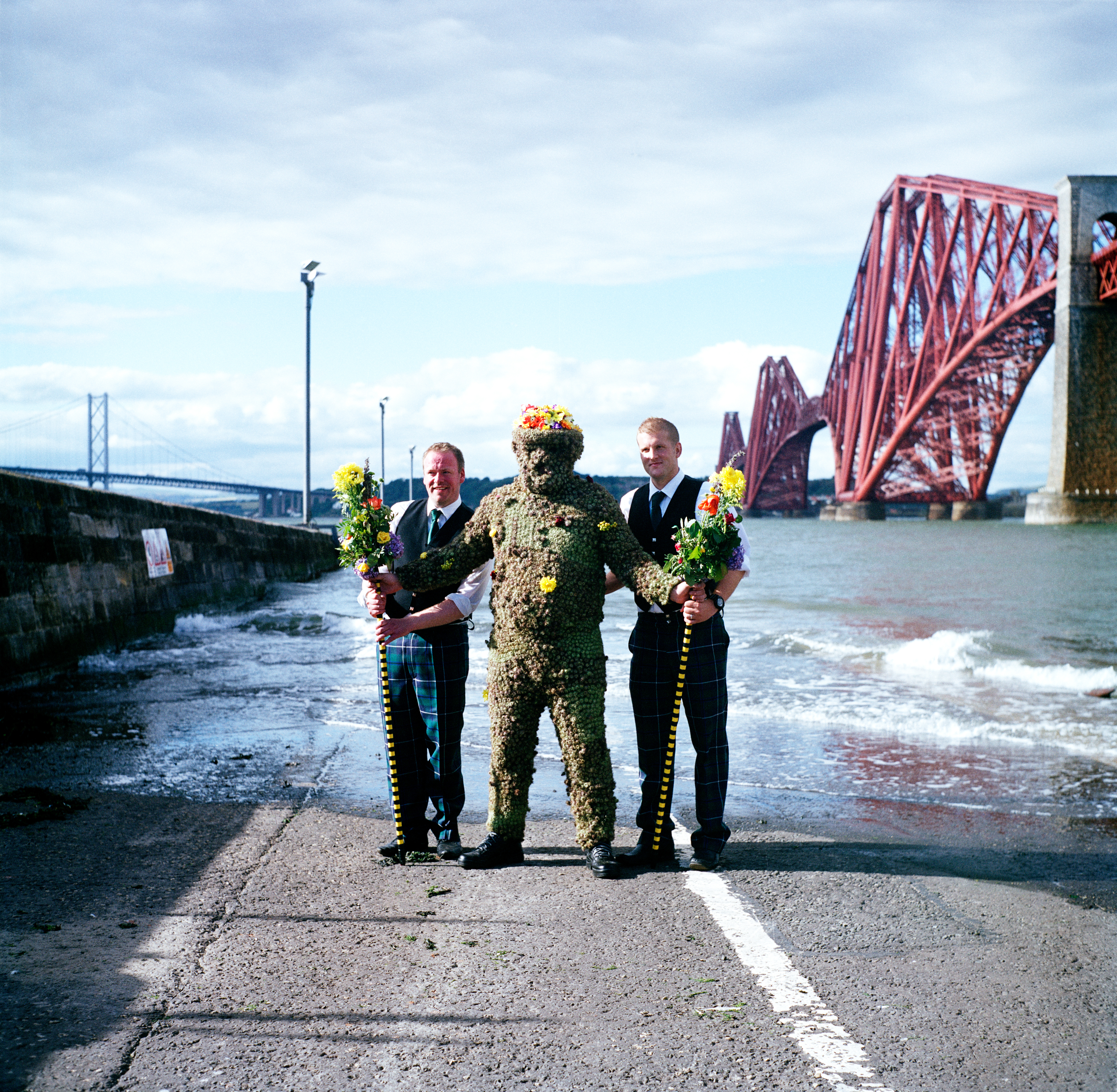
The Burry Man and his attendants pause for a photo close to the Forth Bridge. August 2013, South Queensferry.

The Burryman or Burry Man is the central figure in an annual ceremony or ritual, the Burryman's Parade, that takes place in the town of South Queensferry, near Edinburgh on the south bank of the Firth of Forth in Scotland, on the second Friday of August.

The custom is associated with, but separate from, the town's Ferry Fair. On the Friday morning of the fair, a local man is covered from head to ankles in burrs from two species of burdock, Arctium lappa and A. minus that grow locally, and walked through the town for over nine hours. The meaning of this ceremony has long been forgotten, but it has been the cause of much speculation.

== Origins and history ==
The right to hold the Ferry Fair was first granted in 1687, but the Burryman custom is widely believed to be much older. Similar ceremonies used to be held in other Scottish fishing communities, notably Buckie on the Moray Firth and Fraserburgh, to 'raise the herring' when there had been a poor fishing season. Now, only the South Queensferry ceremony remains in Scotland, though there are possible parallels with the Whittlesea Straw Bear, Irish Wren Day costumes and the Castleton Garland King (and perhaps even the Jack in the green) in England, as well as other customs elsewhere in Europe.

There are many theories about the origin of the custom, what the ceremony means, and why it continues. One idea is that the parade was intended to ward off evil spirits. It has also been suggested that he carries on a pagan tradition thousands of years old; that he is a symbol of rebirth, regeneration and fertility (similar to the Green Man) that pre-dates almost all contemporary religions; that he is a "scapegoat" and that he may have originally been a sacrificial victim.

== The ceremony ==
According to folklorist Christina Hole, writing in 1976, the day of the Burryman ceremony (the second Friday of August) is the day before the town's Ferry Fair. but the present Ferry Fair website suggests that it comes at the end of a week-long fair.

=== Costume ===
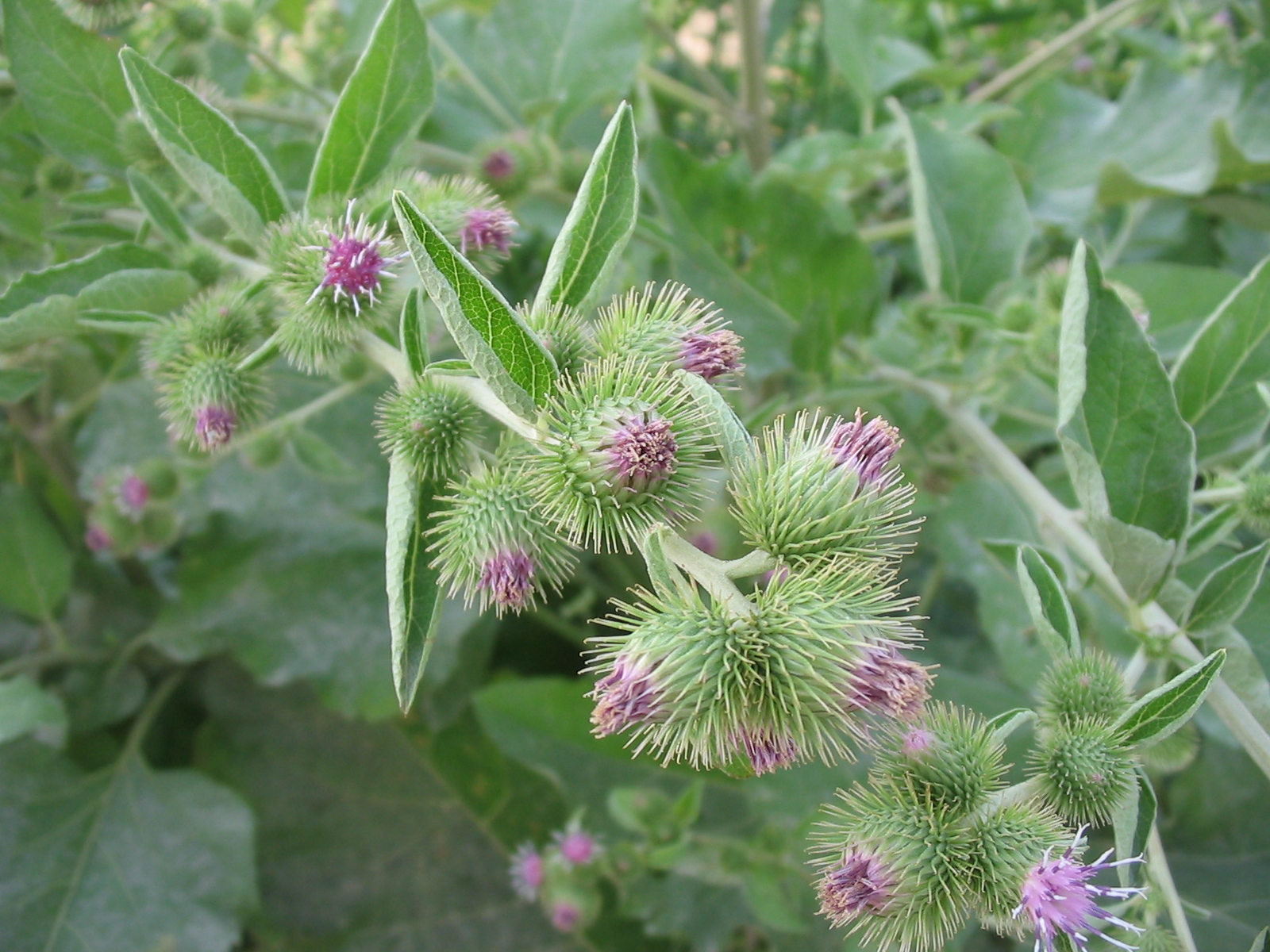
Burrs are the hooked, sticky flowerheads of various species of burdock.

The Burryman is meant to collect his covering of burrs for himself, as well as any ferns and flowers used to decorate his costume and the two flower-covered staves (poles) that he rests his hands on. John Nichol admits to recruiting his family to help gather the large number of burrs (approximately 11,000), which are meshed together into about 25 flat panels (A3 in size), like natural Velcro, which can be wrapped around his body on the morning of the ceremony. The process takes about half an hour. He dresses in several layers of clothing to protect himself from their hooks. A balaclava covers his head and face; it too is covered with burrs, leaving only small eye and mouth holes; a flower-covered bowler hat tops off the outfit.

He wears boots (his feet are the only parts of his body to remain uncovered by burrs) and has a broad sash around his waist, currently made from a folded Royal Standard of Scotland, displaying the top half of a red lion rampant on a bright yellow background. The choice of flag used in the outfit has varied, as a photograph from the 1970s shows the sash around the waist made from a folded Union Flag. However, more recently no flag has been worn as the Burryman himself wanted a more traditional look as flags round the waist was a fairly new idea.

The stickiness of his burry covering means that he has to walk awkwardly, with legs apart and arms held out sideways. He supports his aching arms on waist-high poles decorated with flowers. Two attendants (dressed in normal clothing) guide him through the town and help him through his ordeal.

=== Procession ===
The Burryman walks a seven-mile route through South Queensferry for nine hours or more, starting at the Staghead Hotel where he is dressed in the burrs. The first stop is the former Provost's house at Villa Road then he parades round the town including visits to every public house, at each of which the Burryman is given a free drink of whisky through a straw. Local residents also give the Burryman whisky so by the end of the day he is exhausted. Tradition holds that he will bring good luck to the town if they give him whisky and money, and that bad luck will result if the custom is discontinued.

=== Choice of Burryman ===
Only men born in the village can take on the role of the Burryman. The office is commonly held by the same person for a number of years. Alan Reid was the Burryman for 25 years (until 1999); his successor, John Nicol, took over until 2011. Other past holders of the position have included John "Jacko" Hart, Sam Corson, Arne Fredricksen and Judith McPhillips (the Wee Burry Man, 1948). Since 2012, the position has been held by Andrew Taylor.

== In literature and music ==
In 2005, the Burry Man inspired an avant-garde folk song by Daniel Patrick Quinn, narrated by local man Duncan Grahl.

The Burry Man is also featured in the 2007 period crime novel The Burry Man's Day by Catriona McPherson.

The Burry Man is a central element of the 2022 Doctor Who audio dramas Way of the Burryman and The Forth Generation from Big Finish Productions.

== See also ==
- Straw bear
