= Barry Township =

Barry Township may refer to:

- Barry Township, Pike County, Illinois
- Barry Township, Michigan
- Barry Township, Pine County, Minnesota
- Barry Township, Pennsylvania
