= 1703 Barry =

Asteroid

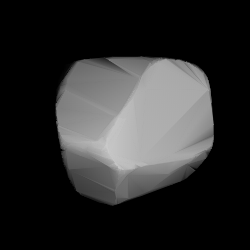
- Shape model of Barry from its lightcurve

Discovery
- Discovered by: M. Wolf
- Discovery site: Heidelberg Obs.
- Discovery date: 2 September 1930

Designations
- Named after: Roger Barry (astronomer)
- Alternative designations: 1930 RB · 1939 FD; 1940 TP · 1943 PA; 1953 PK · 1963 SB
- Minor planet category: main-belt · Flora

Orbital characteristics
- Epoch 4 September 2017 (JD 2458000.5)
- Uncertainty parameter 0
- Observation arc: 86.57 yr (31,620 days)
- Aphelion: 2.5955 AU
- Perihelion: 1.8331 AU
- Semi-major axis: 2.2143 AU
- Eccentricity: 0.1721
- Orbital period (sidereal): 3.30 yr (1,204 days)
- Mean anomaly: 155.09°
- Mean motion: 0° 17^{m} 56.76^{s} / day
- Inclination: 4.5196°
- Longitude of ascending node: 112.28°
- Argument of perihelion: 213.42°

Physical characteristics
- Dimensions: 9.21±0.49 km 9.41±0.5 km 9.50±0.24 km 9.54 km (derived)
- Synodic rotation period: 105.7450±1.8907 h 107.04±0.05 h 107.1±0.5 h
- Geometric albedo: 0.216±0.012; 0.2187±0.026; 0.2805 (derived); 0.330±0.032
- Spectral type: S
- Absolute magnitude (H): 11.845±0.001 (R) · 12.00 · 12.06±0.30 · 12.1 · 12.40

1703 Barry (prov. designation: 1930 RB) is a stony Flora asteroid, suspected tumbler and slow rotator from the inner regions of the asteroid belt, approximately 9.5 kilometer in diameter. Discovered by Max Wolf in 1930, it was later named after Vincentian priest and astronomer Roger Barry.

== Discovery ==
Barry was discovered on 2 September 1930, by German astronomer Max Wolf at Heidelberg Observatory in southern Germany. In the same month, it was independently discovered by Dutch astronomer Hendrik van Gent and Soviet astronomer Evgenii Skvortsov at their observatories in Johannesburg and Crimea-Nauchnij, respectively.

== Orbit and classification ==
The relatively bright S-type asteroid is a member of the Flora family, one of the largest collisional groups in the main-belt. It orbits the Sun in the inner main-belt at a distance of 1.8–2.6 AU once every 3 years and 4 months (1,204 days). Its orbit has an eccentricity of 0.17 and an inclination of 5° with respect to the ecliptic. Its observation arc begins with its official discovery observation at Heidelberg.

== Naming ==
This minor planet was named after Vincentian priest Roger Barry (1752–1813), the Court Astronomer of Grand Duchy of Baden at the Mannheim Observatory in 1788. The Heidelberg Observatory is a direct successor to the old Mannheim Observatory. The official naming citation was published by the Minor Planet Center on 20 February 1976 (M.P.C. 3933).

== Physical characteristics ==
=== Slow rotator ===
Photometric observations taken in 2006 and 2011, by Adrián Galád and by the Palomar Transient Factory, showed a leisurely rotation period of 105.745 and 107.1±0.5 hours with a brightness variation of 0.5 and 0.46 magnitude, respectively (U=3/2).

While most asteroids rotate within 20 hours once around their axis, Barry belongs to the relatively small group of slow rotators with a period above 100 hours.

It may have a non-principal axis rotation. However, no follow-up measurements have since confirmed its tumbling motion.

=== Diameter and albedo ===
According to the surveys carried out by the Infrared Astronomical Satellite IRAS, the Japanese Akari satellite, and NASA's Wide-field Infrared Survey Explorer with its subsequent NEOWISE mission, Barry measures between 9.21 and 9.50 kilometers in diameter and its surface has an albedo between 0.216 and 0.330, while the Collaborative Asteroid Lightcurve Link derives an albedo of 0.280 and a diameter of 9.54 kilometers with an absolute magnitude of 12.1.
