= Ber. =

The abbreviation Ber. may refer to:

- Chemische Berichte, a German-language journal of chemistry
- Berakhot (Talmud), a tractate of the Mishnah
