= Beri, Rajasthan =

Beri Beri Bhajangarh
- Village
- Location in Rajasthan, India Beri (India)
- Coordinates: 27°36′00″N 75°14′29″E
- Country: India
- State: Rajasthan
- District: Sikar

Government
  - Type: Elected directly
  - Sarpanch: Akhiles Kumar

Area
  - Total: 36 km^{2} (14 sq mi)

Population (2001)
  - Total: 7,000 approx
  - Density: 190/km^{2} (500/sq mi)

Languages
  - Official: Hindi
- Time zone: UTC+5:30 (IST)
- PIN: 332031
- Telephone code: 91-1572
- Vehicle registration: RJ-23

Beri is a village in the Jhunjhunu district, Rajasthan state, India. It is located 21 kilometres (13 mi) north of Sikar , and is on the border of the Churu and Jhunjhunu districts.
