= Berri =

Berri may refer to:

== People ==
- Berri (singer), British singer known for her 1995 hit "Sunshine after the Rain"
- Claude Berri (1934-2009), French film director
- David Berri (born 1969), economist and author of The Wages of Wins
- Nabih Berri (born 1938), Lebanese politician

== Places ==
- Berri, South Australia (disambiguation), articles associated with the town and locality in South Australia
- Berri Barmera Council, a local government area in South Australia
- Berri–UQAM station, a station on the Montreal Metro
- Berri Street, a street in Montreal

== Other ==
- Berri, the girlfriend of Conker - see List of characters in the Conker series#Berri

== See also ==
- Beri (disambiguation)
- Berry (disambiguation)
- Berrie, disambiguation page
