= 2017 Liga 2 (Indonesia) final =

2017 Liga 2 final
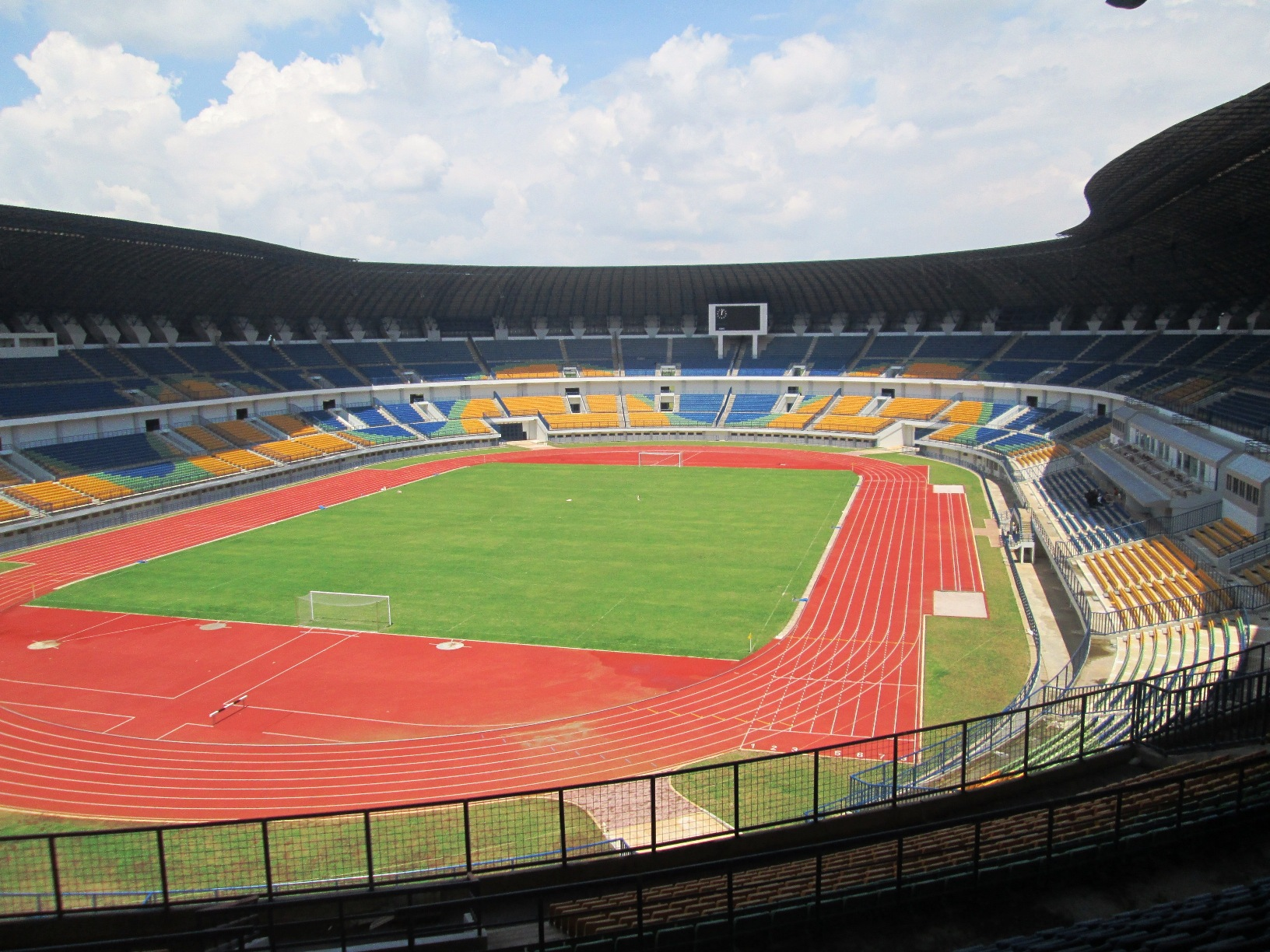
- The Gelora Bandung Lautan Api Stadium in Bandung held the final
- Event: 2017 Liga 2
PSMS	Persebaya
2	3
- at extra time
- Date: 28 November 2017
- Venue: Gelora Bandung Lautan Api Stadium, Bandung
- Referee: Hadiyani
- Attendance: 13,895

The 2017 Liga 2 final decided the winner of the 2017 Liga 2, the second-tier competition in Indonesia. It was played on 28 November 2017 at the Gelora Bandung Lautan Api Stadium in Bandung between PSMS Medan and Persebaya Surabaya.

Persebaya won the match 3–2 on extra time after a 2–2 draw at regular time, winning their 4th title overall.

== Road to the final ==
PSMS
Round
Persebaya
Main article: 2017 Liga 2 (Indonesia) § Group 1

Pos	Team	Pld	W	D	L	GF	GA	GD	Pts
1	PSPS Riau	12	7	4	1	21	8	+13	25
2	PSMS Medan	12	7	2	3	17	6	+11	23
3	Persiraja Banda Aceh	12	6	4	2	20	9	+11	22
4	PS Timah BaBel	12	6	1	5	17	17	0	19
5	757 Kepri Jaya	12	5	3	4	19	12	+7	18
6	PSBL Langsa	12	3	2	7	15	16	−1	11
7	Persih Tembilahan	12	0	0	12	4	45	-41	−6
8	Pro Duta (DQ)	0	0	0	0	0	0	0	0

First round
Main article: 2017 Liga 2 (Indonesia) § Group 5

Pos	Team	Pld	W	D	L	GF	GA	GD	Pts
1	Persebaya Surabaya	14	8	5	1	27	11	+16	29
2	Martapura	14	9	1	4	35	22	+13	28
3	PSIM Yogyakarta	14	6	3	5	21	18	+3	21
4	Persepam Madura Utama	14	5	3	6	25	23	+2	18
5	Persatu Tuban	14	5	3	6	21	20	+1	18
6	Persinga Ngawi	14	4	4	6	16	24	−8	16
7	Madiun Putra	14	4	3	7	16	25	−9	15
8	PSBI Blitar	14	3	2	9	8	26	−18	11

Main article: 2017 Liga 2 (Indonesia) § Group B

Pos	Team	Pld	W	D	L	GF	GA	GD	Pts
1	PSIS Semarang	6	4	1	1	12	4	+8	13
2	PSMS Medan	6	3	1	2	7	5	+3	10
3	Persibat Batang	6	2	1	3	6	9	–3	7
4	Persita Tangerang	6	1	1	4	3	9	–6	4

Second round
Main article: 2017 Liga 2 (Indonesia) § Group C

Pos	Team	Pld	W	D	L	GF	GA	GD	Pts
1	Kalteng Putra	6	3	2	1	10	4	+6	11
2	Persebaya Surabaya	6	2	3	1	10	2	+8	9
3	Persigo Semeru	6	2	3	1	3	4	–1	9
4	PSBS Biak	6	0	2	4	1	13	–12	2

Main article: 2017 Liga 2 (Indonesia) § Group X

Pos	Team	Pld	W	D	L	GF	GA	GD	Pts
1	PSMS Medan	3	2	0	1	4	3	+1	6
2	Martapura	3	2	0	1	4	3	+1	6
3	Kalteng Putra	3	1	0	2	3	4	–1	3
4	Persis Solo	3	1	0	2	1	2	–1	3

Third round
Main article: 2017 Liga 2 (Indonesia) § Group Y

Pos	Team	Pld	W	D	L	GF	GA	GD	Pts
1	Persebaya Surabaya	3	3	0	0	6	0	+6	9
2	PSIS Semarang	3	1	1	1	4	2	+2	4
3	PSPS Riau	3	1	1	1	4	3	+1	4
4	PSMP Mojokerto	3	0	0	3	1	10	–9	0

Opponent
Result
Knockout round
Opponent
Result
PSIS Semarang
2–0 (a.e.t.)
Semi-finals
Martapura
3–1

== Match ==
28 November 2017
19:00 UTC+7:00

PSMS	2–3 (a.e.t.)	Persebaya
Wirahadi 9' (pen.); Roni 38'	Report	Rishadi 2'; Irfan 41', 92'

Gelora Bandung Lautan Api Stadium, Bandung
Attendance: 13,895
Referee: Hadiyani (Bekasi)

PSMS	Persebaya

GK	20	(Indonesia) Abdul Rohim
CB	12	(Indonesia) Wanda Syahputra
CB	25	(Indonesia) Roni Fatahillah	(yellow card) 31'
RB	16	(Indonesia) Derry Herlangga	(yellow card) 17'	(substituted off) 71'
LB	18	(Indonesia) Fredyan Wahyu
DM	24	(Indonesia) Legimin Raharjo (c)
CM	29	(Indonesia) Suhandi	(yellow card) 86'
AM	7	(Indonesia) Dimas Drajad
RW	21	(Indonesia) Frets Butuan	(yellow card) 81'	(substituted off) 105'
LW	22	(Indonesia) Elthon Maran	(yellow card) 24'	(substituted off) 84'
CF	10	(Indonesia) I Made Wirahadi	(yellow card) 27'
Substitutes:
GK	26	(Indonesia) Ahmad Fauzi
DF	3	(Indonesia) Dani Pratama
DF	69	(Indonesia) Hardiantono
MF	6	(Indonesia) Gusti Sandria	(yellow card) 90+1'	(substituted on) 71'
MF	66	(Indonesia) I Wayan Ekananda
MF	88	(Indonesia) Muhammad Alwi Slamat		(substituted on) 105'
FW	11	(Indonesia) Choirul Hidayat		(substituted on) 84'
Head Coach:
(Indonesia) Djajang Nurdjaman

GK	33	(Indonesia) Miswar Saputra
CB	44	(Indonesia) Andri Muliadi
CB	21	(Indonesia) Fandry Imbiri
RB	22	(Indonesia) Abu Rizal Maulana	(yellow card) 14'
LB	25	(Indonesia) Irvan Febrianto
CM	12	(Indonesia) Rendi Irwan (c)		(substituted off) 101'
CM	96	(Indonesia) Muhammad Hidayat
CM	14	(Indonesia) Adam Maulana
RW	41	(Indonesia) Irfan Jaya		(substituted off) 118'
LW	8	(Indonesia) Oktafianus Fernando
CF	26	(Indonesia) Rishadi Fauzi		(substituted off) 86'
Substitutes:
GK	92	(Indonesia) Dimas Galih Pratama
DF	4	(Indonesia) Mokhamad Syaifuddin
DF	13	(Indonesia) Rachmat Irianto
MF	31	(Indonesia) Kurniawan Karman
MF	7	(Indonesia) Sidik Saimima		(substituted on) 101'
MF	78	(Indonesia) Yogi Novrian		(substituted on) 118'
FW	9	(Indonesia) Ricky Kayame		(substituted on) 86'
Head Coach:
(Argentina) Angel Alfredo Vera

Assistant referees:
Ian Asrul Amur
Asep Rohaendi
Fourth official:
Nusur Fadillah (Jakarta)

Match rules

- 90 minutes.
- 30 minutes of extra time if necessary.
- Penalty shoot-out if scores still level.
- Seven named substitutes, of which up to three may be used.
