= 2018 PSMS Medan season =

PSMS Medan
2018 season
- Chairman: Kodrat Shah
- Manager: Djajang Nurdjaman
- Liga 1: 18th
- Indonesia President's Cup: 4th
- Piala Indonesia: To be determined
- Top goalscorer: League: Frets Butuan; Suhandi (4); All: Frets Butuan (6)
- Highest home attendance: 20,000 vs Persib (June 5, 2018)
- Lowest home attendance: 11,600 vs Perseru (April 20, 2018)
- Average home league attendance: 14,994
Home colours	Away colours

The 2018 PSMS season is PSMS Medan's first season in the Liga 1. It will see them compete in the Liga 1, as well as the Indonesia's President Cup and Piala Indonesia.

== Players ==
=== Squad information ===
Players and squad numbers last updated on 22 March 2018.
Note: Flags indicate national team as has been defined under FIFA eligibility rules. Players may hold more than one non-FIFA nationality.

No.	Name	Nat	Position(s)	Date of birth (age)	Signed in	Contract ends	Signed from	Notes
Goalkeepers
18	Dhika Bayangkara	(Indonesia)	GK	29 April 1991 (age 35)	2018	2019	(Indonesia) PS TIRA	
20	Abdul Rohim	(Indonesia)	GK	6 April 1992 (age 34)	2016	2019	(Indonesia) Bintang Jaya Asahan	
26	Ahmad Fauzi	(Indonesia)	GK	30 January 1994 (age 32)	2017	2019	(Indonesia) Bintang Jaya Asahan	
Defenders
3	Firza Andika	(Indonesia)	LB	5 November 1999 (age 26)	2018	2019	(Indonesia) Youth sector	
4	Reinaldo Lobo	(Brazil)	CB	5 April 1988 (age 38)	2018	2019	(Malaysia) Penang	
6	Gusti Sandria	(Indonesia)	LB	6 August 1995 (age 31)	2017	2019	(Indonesia) Bintang Jaya Asahan	
7	Roni Fatahillah	(Indonesia)	CB	7 November 1993 (age 32)	2016	2019	(Indonesia) Gresik United	
12	Wanda Syahputra	(Indonesia)	LB / RB	1 December 1994 (age 31)	2017	2019	(Indonesia) PS TIRA	
13	Dani Pratama	(Indonesia)	CB		2017	2019	(Indonesia) PSS Sleman	
15	Bima Alfareza	(Indonesia)	LB / RB					
16	Muhammad Roby	(Indonesia)	LB / RB	12 December 1985 (age 40)	2018	2019	(Indonesia) Sriwijaya	
28	Jajang Sukmara	(Indonesia)	CB / DM	18 November 1988 (age 37)	2018	2019	(Indonesia) Persib Bandung	
Midfielders
5	Donni Hasibuan	(Indonesia)	MF	23 March 1997 (age 29)	2018	2019	(Indonesia) Pro Duta	
8	Abdul Aziz	(Indonesia)	CM / DM	14 February 1994 (age 32)	2018	2019	(Indonesia) Borneo F.C.	
24	Legimin Raharjo	(Indonesia)	RW	10 May 1981 (age 45)	2015	2019	(Indonesia) PS TIRA	Captain
29	Suhandi	(Indonesia)	LW	29 October 1991 (age 34)	2017	2019	(Indonesia) PS TIRA	
30	Dilshod Sharofetdinov	(Uzbekistan)	AM / RW / CM	15 October 1985 (age 40)	2018	2019	(Malaysia) T-Team	
33	Amarzukih	(Indonesia)	AM / CM	21 June 1984 (age 42)	2017	2019	(Indonesia) Persija	
53	Erwin Ramdani	(Indonesia)	RW / LW	11 March 1993 (age 33)	2017	2019	(Indonesia) PS TIRA	Vice-captain
88	Alwi Slamat	(Indonesia)	LW / LM	16 December 1996 (age 29)	2017	2019	(Indonesia) PS TIRA	
98	Fredyan Wahyu	(Indonesia)	CM / DM	11 April 1998 (age 28)	2017	2019	(Indonesia) PS TIRA	
Forwards
9	Choiril Hidayat	(Indonesia)	ST	29 April 1994 (age 32)	2017	2019	(Indonesia) PS TIRA	
10	Sadney Urikhob	(Namibia)	ST / LW	19 January 1992 (age 34)	2018	2019	(Thailand) Bec Tero Sasana	
11	N'Guessan Yessoh	(Ivory Coast)	ST	12 March 1992 (age 34)	2018	2019	(Qatar) Muaither	
17	Antony Nugroho	(Indonesia)	ST	25 February 1994 (age 32)	2018	2019	(Indonesia) Bhayangkara	
21	Frets Butuan	(Indonesia)	ST	4 June 1996 (age 30)	2017	2019	(Indonesia) PS TIRA	
23	Akbar Rambe	(Indonesia)	ST	23 March 1999 (age 27)	2018	2019	(Indonesia) Youth sector	

== Goal scorers ==
As of May 2018

Name	League	Cup	Total
Frets Butuan	4	2	6
Suhandi	4	1	5
N'Guessan Yessoh	3	2	5
Sadney Urikhob	2	1	3
Antony Nugroho	-	2	2
Dilshod Sharofetdinov	1	-	1
Legimin Raharjo	1	-	1
Reinaldo Lobo	1	-	1

== Pre-season friendlies ==
Date	Opponents	H / A	Result F-A
23 December 2017	PSAD FC	H	2 – 3
27 December 2017	Asam Kumbang FC	H	1 – 2
30 December 2017	PD Pasar	H	2 – 0
4 January 2017	Gumarang FC	H	3 – 1
6 January 2017	Buana Putra	H	3 – 0
10 January 2017	Gumarang FC	H	1 – 1
12 January 2017	Porwil	H	3 – 0
30 January 2018	Persiraja Banda Aceh	A	0 – 0
24 February 2018	Buana Putra	N	2 – 0
27 February 2018	Semen Padang	N	1 – 1
2 March 2018	Barito Putera	N	2 – 2
4 March 2018	PSS Sleman	A	1 – 2
8 March 2018	Gumarang FC	H	5 – 1
17 March 2018	PSPS Riau	H	3 – 0

== Indonesia President's Cup ==
Date	Round	Opponents	H / A	Result F–A	Scorers	Attendance
16 January 2018	Group stage	PSM Makassar	N	2 - 1	Suhandi 38', Antony 66	2,306
21 January 2018	Group stage	Persib Bandung	A	2 - 0	Frets 26', Antony 30'	29,676
26 January 2018	Group stage	Sriwijaya	N	0 - 2		8,571
3 February 2018	Quarter Final	Persebaya	N	p3 - 3	Yessoh 6' Urikhob 42' Frets 46'	22,184
10 February 2018	Semi Final	Persija	H	1 - 4	Yessoh 41'	22,320
12 February 2018	Semi Final	Persija	A	0 - 1		6,978
17 February 2018	Third-place match	Sriwijaya	N	0 - 4		68,272

== Competitions ==
=== Go-Jek Liga 1 ===

PSMS XI Go-Jek Liga 1 2018

==== League table ====
Locations of the 2018 Liga 1 teams

Pos	Team	Pld	W	D	L	GF	GA	GD	Pts	Qualification or relegation
14	Perseru	34	11	9	14	34	41	−7	42 (Note: Head-to-head results: Perseru 0–0 PS TIRA; PS TIRA 0–1 Perseru)	
15	PS TIRA	34	12	6	16	48	57	−9	42	
16	Mitra Kukar (R)	34	12	3	19	45	58	−13	39 (Note: Head-to-head results: Mitra Kukar 3–0 Sriwijaya; Sriwijaya 3–1 Mitra Kukar)	Relegation to Liga 2
17	Sriwijaya (R)	34	11	6	17	48	56	−8	39	Relegation to Liga 2
18	PSMS (Note: PSMS were deducted three points due to FIFA sanction.) (R)	34	11	4	19	50	70	−20	34	Relegation to Liga 2

Source: Go-Jek Liga 1, Soccerway
Rules for classification: 1) Points; 2) Head-to-head; 3) Goal difference; 4) Goals scored; 5) Drawing.
(R) Relegated

==== Result summary ====
Overall								Home						Away					
Pld	W	D	L	GF	GA	GD	Pts	W	D	L	GF	GA	GD	W	D	L	GF	GA	GD
20	6	1	13	22	36	−14	19	6	0	4	16	14	+2	0	1	9	6	22	−16

==== Results by matchday ====
Matchday	1	2	3	4	5	6	7	8	9	10	11	12	13	14	15	16	17	18	19	20	21	22	23	24	25	26	27	28	29	30	31	32	33	34
Ground	A	H	H	A	H	A	H	A	H	A	H	A	H	A	H	A	H	H	A	A														
Result	L	L	W	L	W	L	W	L	W	L	W	L	L	L	L	L	W	L	L	D														
Position	16	17	14	17	13	15	11	15	10	12	6	11	12	12	12	12	12	12	12	12														

Updated to match(es) played on August 12, 2018. Source: liga-indonesia.id
A = Away; H = Home; W = Win; D = Draw; L = Loss

==== Matches ====
Win Draw Loss

24 March 2018 1	Bali United	1-0	PSMS Medan	Gianyar, Bali
19:30 ICST	Lilipaly 56'	Report		Stadium: Kapten I Wayan Dipta; Attendance: 17,023; Referee: M. Nugraha

30 March 2018 ^{a} 2	PSMS Medan	1-2	Bhayangkara	Medan, North Sumatra
15:30 IWST	Suhandi 64'		Dzumafo 39'; Komazec 46'	Stadium: Teladan Stadium; Attendance: 15542; Referee: Y. Kridianto

6 April 2018 3	PSMS Medan	3-1	Persija Jakarta	Medan, North Sumatera
15.30 UTC+7	Šimić 42' (og.); Lobo 44'; Suhandi 54'	Report	Rohit 23'	Stadium: Teladan Stadium; Attendance: 17840; Referee: Prasetyo Hadi (Surabaya)

April 15, 2018 4	PSIS Semarang	4-1	PSMS Medan	Magelang, Central Java
15.30 UTC+7	Bruno 42' 45+4' 64'; Conteh 43'	Report	Frets 50'	Stadium: Madya Stadium; Attendance: 6611; Referee: Bacrul Ulum

April 20, 2018 5	PSMS Medan	1-0	Perseru Serui	Medan, North Sumatra
18:30 ICST	Urikhob 27'	Report		Stadium: Teladan Stadium; Attendance: 11600; Referee: Dwi Susilo (DKI Jakarta)

15 April 2018 6	Persela Lamongan	4-1	PSMS Medan	Lamongan, East Java
18.00 UTC+7	Al-Ayyubi 3'; Wallace 8'; Arnaud 44' 63'	Report	Suhandi 54'	Stadium: Surajaya Stadium; Attendance: 9386; Referee: W. Rapiko

May 5, 2018 7	PSMS Medan	3-2	Barito Putra	Medan, North Sumatra
15:30 UTC+7	Yessoh 29' Frets 50' Legimin 85' (pen.)	Report	Packer 64' (pen.) 81'	Stadium: Teladan Stadium; Attendance: 11600; Referee: A. Riyanto

May 11, 2018 8	PS TIRA	3-2	PSMS Medan	Bantul, Yogyakarta
15:30 UTC+7	Mukti 8' Febrianto 34' López 39'	Report	Frets 29' Suhandi 45+1'	Stadium: Sultan Agung; Attendance: 982

May 18, 2018 9	PSMS Medan	1-0	Sriwijaya FC	Medan, North Sumatra
21:00 UTC+7	Dilshod 84'	Report		Stadium: Teladan; Attendance: 13300; Referee: R. Tambuntina

May 22, 2018 10	Mitra Kukar	1-0	PSMS Medan	Tenggarong, East Kalimantan
20:30 UTC+7	Mauricio 90+1'	Report		Stadium: Aji Imbut; Attendance: 2.2013; Referee: N. Rohaendii

May 26, 2018 11	PSMS Medan	2-0	Arema FC	Medan, North Sumatra
21:00 UTC+7	Yessoh 42' 45+2'			Stadium: Teladan; Attendance: 13042; Referee: Yudi Nurcahya

June 1, 2018 12	Borneo FC	3-1	PSMS Medan	Samarinda
20:30 UTC+7	Lopičić 27' 54' Ambrizal 34'		Frets 77'	Stadium: Segiri; Attendance: 5611; Referee: Tabrani

June 5, 2018 13	PSMS Medan	0-3	Persib Bandung	Medan
21:0 UTC+7			Ezechiel 22' 81' In-Kyun 38'	Stadium: Teladan; Attendance: 20.000; Referee: F. Hitaba

July 8, 2018 14	Madura United	1-0	PSMS Medan	East Java
22:00 UTC+7				Stadium: Gelora Ratu Pamelinga

=== Piala Indonesia ===
Win Draw Loss

April 2018 Second round	TBD	v	TBD
