= Irvan =

Irvan is the name of:

- Irvan Sidik
- Irvan Perez
- Irvan Mofu
- Irvan Febrianto
- Irvan Williams
- Ernie Irvan
- Jared Irvan
