= Mohamad Saleh Umar =

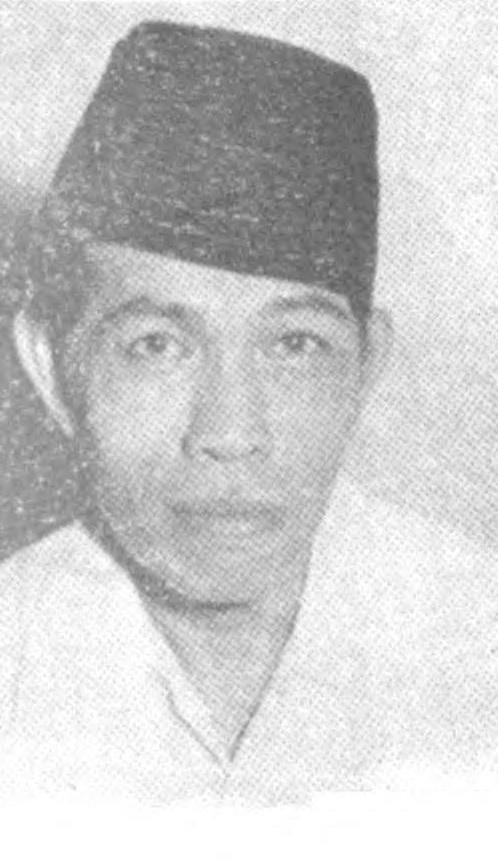
Mohamad Saleh Umar

Mohamad Saleh Umar, also known by his pen name Surapati, was an Indonesian journalist, writer, and politician.

Born in Pangkalan Brandan, East Sumatera on 29 March 1909, he was educated at the Pesantren Sekolah Menengah Agama in Tanjungpura.

He was a member of the Indonesian National Party (PNI) and Partindo.

He often used theatre as a medium of political and social expression, particularly during the Japanese occupation of the Dutch East Indies.

Following the Proclamation of Indonesian Independence and during the Dutch-led military offensive in parts of Java and Sumatera known as Operation Product, he was the editor of the Mimbar Umum daily newspaper.

He was involved in the conflict known as the East Sumatra revolution between the various Malay kerajaan and the revolutionary Indonesian national movement.

A strong supporter of the concept of Bangsa Indonesia, he eschewed his Batak marga Hasibuan identity and considered himself to be Indonesian.

Following Indonesian independence, he was imprisoned by the Indonesian government. After his release in July 1952, he became a member of the House of Representatives.
