= Hasibuan =

Batak surname originating in Indonesia

Hasibuan is one of Toba Batak clans originating in North Sumatra, Indonesia. People of this clan bear the clan's name as their surname. Notable people of this clan include:

- Albert Hasibuan (1939-2022), Indonesian politician
- Anniesa Hasibuan (born 1986), Indonesian fashion designer and fraudster
- Donni Dio Hasibuan (born 1998), Indonesian professional footballer
- Madmuin Hasibuan (1922-1961), Indonesian politician and military officer
- Otto Hasibuan (born 1955), Indonesian lawyer and businessman
- Soeman Hs (1904-1999), Indonesian author
- Hans Hasibuan (born 1984), Leading figure in Indonesian finance
