= Iftiqar Rizal =

Indonesian footballer

Personal information
- Full name: Iftiqar Rizal
- Date of birth: 12 January 1999 (age 27)
- Place of birth: Aceh Tamiang, Indonesia
- Height: 1.78 m (5 ft 10 in)
- Position: Defensive midfielder

Youth career
- 2014–2017: PPLP Aceh
- 2017–2019: Borneo

Senior career*
Years	Team	Apps	(Gls)
2020	Persikota Tangerang	0	(0)
2021	Persiraja Banda Aceh	12	(0)
2022–2024	Gresik United	9	(0)
2024	Persijap Jepara	1	(0)
2025–2026	Dejan	5	(0)
- * Club domestic league appearances and goals as of 30 January 2026

Iftiqar Rizal (born 12 January 1999) is an Indonesian professional footballer who plays as a defensive midfielder.

== Club career ==
=== Persiraja Banda Aceh ===
He was signed for Persiraja Banda Aceh to play in Liga 1 in the 2021 season. Rizal made his first-team debut on 28 September 2021 as a substitute in a match against Persela Lamongan at the Pakansari Stadium, Cibinong.

=== Gresik United ===
Rizal was signed for Gresik United to play in Liga 2 in the 2022–23 season.

== Career statistics ==
=== Club ===
As of 30 January 2026

Club	Season	League			Cup		Continental		Other		Total	
Club	Season	Division	Apps	Goals	Apps	Goals	Apps	Goals	Apps	Goals	Apps	Goals
Persiraja Banda Aceh	2021	Liga 1	12	0	0	0	–		0	0	12	0
Gresik United	2022–23	Liga 2	8	0	0	0	–		0	0	8	0
Gresik United	2023–24	Liga 2	1	0	0	0	–		0	0	1	0
Persijap Jepara	2024–25	Liga 2	1	0	0	0	–		0	0	1	0
Dejan	2025–26	Liga Nusantara	5	0	0	0	–		0	0	5	0
Career total			27	0	0	0	0	0	0	0	27	0

== Honours ==
Dejan

- Liga Nusantara runner-up: 2025–26
