= Annas Fitranto =

Indonesian footballer

Personal information
- Full name: Annas Fitranto
- Date of birth: April 6, 1994 (age 32)
- Place of birth: Malang, Indonesia
- Height: 1.80 m (5 ft 11 in)
- Position: Goalkeeper

Youth career
- Diklat Ragunan
- 2015–2016: PON Jatim

Senior career*
Years	Team	Apps	(Gls)
2013	Persekam Metro	11	(0)
2014	Perseta Tulungagung	0	(0)
2014–2015	PSBK Blitar	5	(0)
2015–2016	Persepam Madura Utama	11	(0)
2017–2018	Perseru Serui	8	(0)
2019–2021	Persita Tangerang	20	(0)
2021	→ PSG Pati (loan)	9	(0)
2022–2023	PSM Makassar	0	(0)
2022	→ PSCS Cilacap (loan)	7	(0)
2023–2024	Persikab Bandung	4	(0)
2024	Dejan	4	(0)
- * Club domestic league appearances and goals as of 27 October 2024

Annas Fitranto (born April 6, 1994) is an Indonesian professional footballer who last played as a goalkeeper for Liga 2 club Dejan.

== Club career ==
=== Persita Tangerang ===
He was signed for Persita Tangerang to play in Liga 2 in the 2019 season.

==== PSG Pati (loan) ====
In 2021, Fitranto signed a contract with Indonesian Liga 2 club PSG Pati, on loan from Persita Tangerang. He made his league debut on 4 October against PSCS Cilacap at the Manahan Stadium, Surakarta.

=== PSM Makassar ===
Fitranto was signed for PSM Makassar to play in Liga 1 in the 2022–23 season.

== Honours ==
=== Club ===
Persita Tangerang

- Liga 2 runner-up: 2019
