= Nahumarury =

Nahumarury is a Moluccan surname. Notable people with the surname include:

- Imran Nahumarury (born 1978), Indonesian footballer and manager
- Rifan Nahumarury (born 1994), Indonesian footballer
