= Francisco Rotunno =

Chilean footballer (1976–2025)

Personal information
- Full name: Francisco Javier Rotunno Merino
- Date of birth: 2 February 1976
- Place of birth: Chillán, Chile
- Date of death: 9 May 2025 (aged 49)
- Position: Defender

Youth career
- Deportivo Nacional
- Coquimbo Unido

Senior career*
Years	Team	Apps	(Gls)
1993–2001	Coquimbo Unido	88	(1)
1998	→ Deportes Antofagasta (loan)		(1)
2002	Cobresal	17	(0)
2003	Deportes La Serena		(0)
2003	→ Deportes Antofagasta (loan)		(0)
2003	Coquimbo Unido	7	(0)
2003–2007	Persekabpas Pasuruan		(1)
2007	Sriwijaya FC		(0)
2008	Persekabpas Pasuruan		(0)
- * Club domestic league appearances and goals

Francisco Javier Rotunno Merino (2 February 1976 – 9 May 2025) was a Chilean professional footballer who played as a defender for clubs in Chile and Indonesia.

== Career ==
Born in Chillán, Rotunno tried to join Ñublense at the age of 15, while he was a youth player of Club Deportivo Nacional. Then, he joined Coquimbo Unido youth system and made his professional debut in 1993 against Deportes La Serena, the traditional rival, at the age of 17, thanks to the coach José Sulantay. He stayed with the club until 2001, even facing the Chile national team led by Iván Zamorano and Marcelo Salas on 25 June 2000 in the Estadio Francisco Sánchez Rumoroso.

In Chile, he only played for clubs from North Zone: Deportes Antofagasta in 1998 and 2003, Cobresal in 2002, Deportes La Serena in 2003, returning to Coquimbo Unido for the 2003 Torneo Clausura.

At the end of 2003, he went to Bali, Indonesia, and joined Persekabpas Pasuruan, staying for 6 seasons. He scored only one goal in the 2005 season, but he was considered one of the most important foreign players in Indonesian football. He also played for Sriwijaya FC.

== Personal life and death ==
Rotunno lived in Coquimbo alongside his wife, Claudia Oteíza, and his sons Paolo and Renato. Renato was with the Coquimbo Unido youth ranks. Rotunno died on 9 May 2025, at the age of 49.
