= Beri Santoso =

Indonesian footballer

Personal information
- Full name: Rahmat Beri Santoso
- Date of birth: 24 February 2004 (age 22)
- Place of birth: Jombang, Indonesia
- Height: 1.73 m (5 ft 8 in)
- Position: Right winger

Team information
- Current team: Persekabpas Pasuruan

Youth career
- PSID Jombang
- 2019: Persebaya Surabaya
- 2020–2021: Barito Putera

Senior career*
Years	Team	Apps	(Gls)
2022–2026	Barito Putera	29	(1)
2026–	Persekabpas Pasuruan	0	(0)

International career^{‡}
2022	Indonesia U20	6	(0)
- * Club domestic league appearances and goals as of 11 January 2026 ‡ National team caps and goals as of 17 November 2022 (UTC)

Rahmat Beri Santoso (born 24 February 2004) is an Indonesian professional footballer, who plays as a right winger for Liga Nusantara club Persekabpas Pasuruan.

== Club career ==
=== Barito Putera ===
He was signed for Barito Putera to play in Liga 1 on 2021 season. Beri made his professional debut on 9 January 2022 in a match against Bali United as a substitute for Ambrizal Umanailo in the 87th minute at the Ngurah Rai Stadium, Denpasar.

== International career ==
On 14 September 2022, Beri made his debut for Indonesia U-20 national team against Timor-Leste U-20, in a 4–0 win in the 2023 AFC U-20 Asian Cup qualification.

In October 2022, it was reported that Beri received a call-up from the Indonesia U-20 for a training camp, in Turkey and Spain.

== Career statistics ==
=== Club ===
As of 11 January 2026.

Club	Season	League			Cup		Continental		Other		Total	
Club	Season	Division	Apps	Goals	Apps	Goals	Apps	Goals	Apps	Goals	Apps	Goals
Barito Putera	2021–22	Liga 1	3	0	0	0	–		0	0	3	0
Barito Putera	2022–23	Liga 1	14	0	0	0	–		2 (Note: Appearances in Indonesia President's Cup)	0	16	0
Barito Putera	2023–24	Liga 1	0	0	0	0	–		0	0	0	0
Barito Putera	2024–25	Liga 1	7	1	0	0	–		0	0	7	1
Barito Putera	2025–26	Championship	5	0	0	0	–		0	0	5	0
Persekabpas Pasuruan	2026–27	Liga Nusantara	0	0	0	0	–		0	0	0	0
Career total			29	1	0	0	0	0	2	0	31	1
