= Adam Maulana =

Indonesian association footballer

Personal information
- Full name: Adam Maulana
- Date of birth: 26 March 1997 (age 29)
- Place of birth: Surabaya, Indonesia
- Height: 1.72 m (5 ft 8 in)
- Positions: Central midfielder; defender

Team information
- Current team: De Red
- Number: 97

Senior career*
Years	Team	Apps	(Gls)
2017–2018	Persebaya Surabaya	3	(0)
2019–2022	Persiba Balikpapan	8	(0)
2022–2023	Persikab Bandung	3	(0)
2023–2025	Persiraja Banda Aceh	31	(2)
2025–2026	Persela Lamongan	20	(0)
2026–	De Red	2	(0)
- * Club domestic league appearances and goals as of 25 September 2026

Adam Maulana (born 26 March 1997) is an Indonesian professional footballer who plays as a central midfielder or defender.

== Honours ==
=== Club ===
Persebaya Surabaya

- Liga 2: 2017
