= Choiril Hidayat =

Indonesian footballer

Personal information
- Full name: Choiril Hidayat
- Date of birth: 29 April 1994 (age 32)
- Place of birth: Sukabumi, Indonesia
- Height: 1.71 m (5 ft 7 in)
- Position: Midfielder

Senior career*
| Years | Team | Apps | (Gls) |
| 2016 | PS TNI | 0 | (0) |
| 2017–2018 | PSMS Medan | 22 | (3) |
| 2019 | Persibat Batang | 5 | (0) |
| 2019–2020 | PSGC Ciamis | 10 | (0) |
- * Club domestic league appearances and goals as of 21 October 2019

Choiril Hidayat (born 29 April 1994) is an Indonesian professional footballer who plays as a midfielder.

== Career ==
Choiril made his debut on 13 November 2017 with PSMS in 2017 Liga 2, the big Eight round replaced Elthon Maran's accumulated card. He scored the opening goal in the 22nd minute against Martapura F.C. with the final score 2-1 win at Patriot Chandrabhaga Stadium in Bekasi.

== Personal life ==
Choiril Hidayat has a twin brother named Choirul Hidayat who in 2017 Liga 2 one club in PSMS Medan. Choiril and Choirul were formerly active TNI members.

== Honours ==
=== Club ===
PSMS Medan

- Liga 2 runner-up: 2017
