= Gelora Bandung Lautan Api Stadium =

Stadium in Bandung, West Java, Indonesia

- Stadion Gelora Bandung Lautan Api
- GBLA
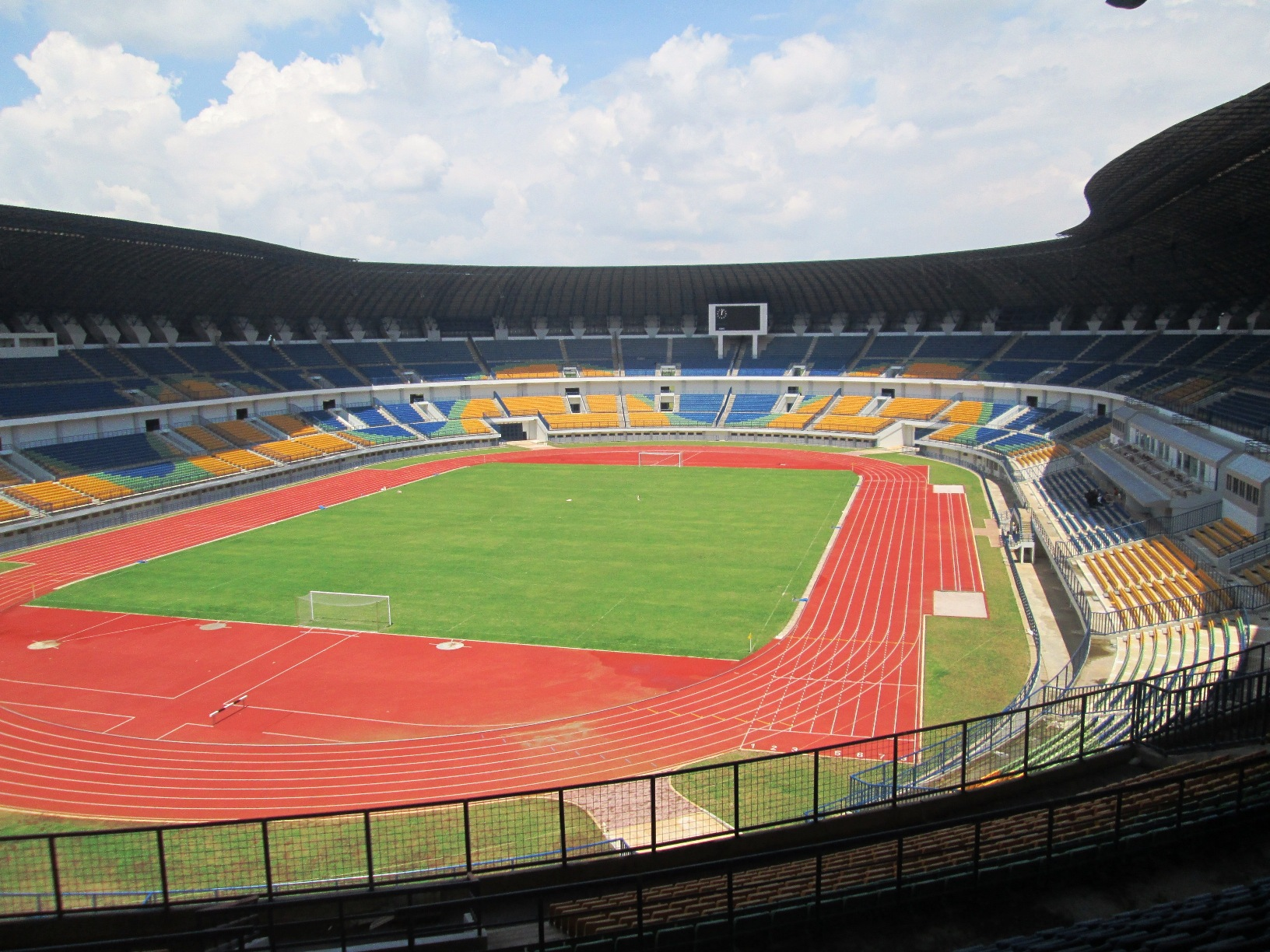
- Gelora Bandung Lautan Api Stadium
- Interactive map of Gelora Bandung Lautan Api Stadium
- Location: Gedebage, Bandung, West Java
- Coordinates: 6°57′27.1″S 107°42′43.5″E
- Owner: Bandung City Government
- Operator: Persib Bandung via their sister companies, PT Persib Gelora Sawarga
- Capacity: 38,000
- Surface: Manila grass
- Public transit: Cimekar; Tegalluar

Construction
- Groundbreaking: October 2009
- Opened: March 2013
- Cost: Rp 545 billion
- Architect: Penta Architecture

Tenant
- Persib Bandung (2016–2018, 2022–Present)

Gelora Bandung Lautan Api Stadium (Indonesian: Stadion Gelora Bandung Lautan Api, lit. 'Bandung Sea of Fire Sports Center Stadium with a double entendre meaning 'the Spirit of Bandung Sea of Fire Stadium'') is a stadium in Gedebage subdistrict, Bandung, West Java, Indonesia. The local football club Persib play their home games here.

== History ==
In 2026, Persib announced plans to replace all the grass of the stadium.

== Funding ==
The initial agreement between the provincial government had an MoU with the Bandung City Government in 2008, with agreed proportion of 60% funding from the provincial government. Therefore, the stadium will be owned by the provincial government. In recent developments, with the MoU signed 27 December 2009, the whole funding is from the city government and the stadium would be owned by the city government. However, the West Java provincial government would help via the financial aid budget (Bankeu) for 3 years.

== Facilities ==
The stadium's design adheres to the international standards for stadium design. The grass used is Zoysia matrella (Linn) Merr which is of FIFA standard class. The stadium is equipped with; a football pitch, athletics track, offices, big screen and fireproof seats from Ferco Seating. The stadium is completed with 38,000 individual seats. The stadium has four storey with an area of 72,000 square meters, combined with other supporting facilities with total of 40 hectares. It also has a total of 766 toilets, a VIP box with bulletproof glass, and a helicopter pad.

== International matches hosted ==
Date	Competition	Team	Res.	Team	Crowd
24 September 2022	International Friendly	Indonesia	3–2	Curaçao	7,095

== Sport events ==
- 2017 Liga 2 semi-finals and final.
- 2018 Indonesia President's Cup
- 2022 Indonesia President's Cup
