= Dimas Galih Pratama =

Indonesian footballer (born 1992)

Dimas Galih
Personal information
- Full name: Dimas Galih Pratama
- Date of birth: 23 November 1992 (age 33)
- Place of birth: Surabaya, Indonesia
- Height: 1.85 m (6 ft 1 in)
- Position: Goalkeeper

Team information
- Current team: De Red
- Number: 92

Youth career
- 2008−2009: Deportivo Indonesia
- 2010: Persebaya 1927

Senior career*
Years	Team	Apps	(Gls)
2011–2013	Persebaya 1927		
2014–2015	Persijap Jepara	6	(0)
2015–2016	PSM Makassar	5	(0)
2016–2017	Gresik United	16	(0)
2017–2018	Persebaya Surabaya	11	(0)
2019–2020	Kalteng Putra	15	(0)
2020	Persik Kediri	2	(0)
2021–2022	Sulut United	7	(0)
2023–2024	PSMS Medan	2	(0)
2024–2025	RANS Nusantara	11	(0)
2025–2026	PSBS Biak	2	(0)
2026–	De Red	2	(0)

International career
2009	Indonesia U19	0	(0)
- * Club domestic league appearances and goals as of 23:11, 2 October 2026 (UTC)

Dimas Galih Pratama (born 23 November 1992) is an Indonesian professional footballer who plays as a goalkeeper for Championship club De Red.

== Club career ==
=== Kalteng Putra ===
In 2019, Dimas Galih signed a contract with Indonesian Liga 1 club Kalteng Putra. He made his league debut on 16 May 2019 in a match against PSIS Semarang at the Moch. Soebroto Stadium, Magelang.

=== Persik Kediri ===
He was signed for Persik Kediri to play in Liga 1 in the 2020 season. Dimas Galih made his league debut on 29 February 2020 in a match against Persebaya Surabaya at the Gelora Bung Tomo Stadium, Surabaya. This season was suspended on 27 March 2020 due to the COVID-19 pandemic. The season was abandoned and was declared void on 20 January 2021.

=== Sulut United ===
In 2021, Dimas Galih signed a contract with Indonesian Liga 2 club Sulut United. He made his league debut on 6 October against Persewar Waropen at the Tuah Pahoe Stadium, Palangka Raya.

== Honours ==
=== Club ===
Persebaya Surabaya

- Liga Primer Indonesia: 2011
- Malaysia-Indonesia Unity Cup: 2011
- Indonesia Premier League runner-up: 2011–12
- Liga 2: 2017
