= Suhandi =

Indonesian footballer

Personal information
- Full name: Suhandi
- Date of birth: 29 October 1991 (age 35)
- Place of birth: Bandung, Indonesia
- Height: 1.69 m (5 ft 7 in)
- Position: Attacking midfielder

Senior career*
Years	Team	Apps	(Gls)
2014	PSGC Ciamis	14	(0)
2015	PSMS Medan	0	(0)
2016–2017	PS TNI	18	(2)
2017–2018	PSMS Medan	28	(12)
2019	PSS Sleman	0	(0)
2019–2021	Badak Lampung	21	(2)
2021	Muba Babel United	0	(0)
2021–2023	Dewa United	21	(1)
2023–2025	PSKC Cimahi	29	(2)
2025–2026	Persitara North Jakarta	15	(0)
- * Club domestic league appearances and goals as of 25 January 2026

Suhandi (born 29 October 1991) is an Indonesian professional footballer who plays as an attacking midfielder.

== Club career ==
=== Badak Lampung ===
He was signed for Badak Lampung to play in Liga 1. Suhandi made his debut on 24 May 2019 in a match against PSM Makassar. On 23 September 2019, Suhandi scored his first goal for Badak Lampung against TIRA-Persikabo in the 45th minute at the Sumpah Pemuda Stadium, Bandar Lampung.

== Honours ==
=== Club ===
PSMS Medan

- Liga 2 runner-up: 2017

Dewa United

- Liga 2 third place (play-offs): 2021
