= Anniesa Hasibuan =

Indonesian fashion designer

Anniesa Hasibuan (born 1986) is an Indonesian fraudster.

Born in Jakarta, she opened her first boutique in Kemang in early 2015. She made her fashion debut in London in March 2015 and has travelled to Europe and the United States to showcase her work. In September 2016, at her debut show at New York Fashion Week, her collection featured the hijab in every look. However, it has been indicated that she had paid a fortune so that her work could be featured during the fashion week. Later she was arrested together with her husband after the revelation that her company "First Travel" had committed a hajj scam by using the Ponzi scheme.

On 30 May 2018, Hasibuan was jailed for 18 years for fraud, after prosecutors found she had embezzled 848 billion rupiah (US$60 million) paid by customers to organize pilgrimages that never took place. Her husband was jailed for twenty years and they both received a 10 billion rupiah fine.
