= Wilfried Yessoh =

Ivorian footballer

Personal information
- Full name: N'Guessan Wilfried Kisito Yessoh
- Date of birth: 12 March 1992 (age 34)
- Place of birth: Ivory Coast
- Height: 1.85 m (6 ft 1 in)
- Position: Forward

Team information
- Current team: Kabuscorp

Senior career*
Years	Team	Apps	(Gls)
2014–2015	Nouadhibou		
2015–2016	Denguélé		
2016–2017	Al Ahli	13	(2)
2017	→ Muaither (loan)	10	(5)
2018	PSMS Medan	15	(4)
2019	ENPPI SC	6	(0)
2019–2020	ASEC Mimosas		
2020–2021	G.D. Interclube	16	(2)
2022-2024	Stade d'Abidjan	10	(0)
2024-	Kabuscorp	24	(6)
- * Club domestic league appearances and goals

N'Guessan Wilfried Kisito Yessoh (born 12 March 1992) is an Ivorian footballer who plays as a forward for Kabuscorp from Angola.
