= Persekabpas Pasuruan =

Indonesian football club

Persekabpas
- Full name: Perserikatan Sepakbola Kabupaten Pasuruan
- Nicknames: Laskar Sakera (Sakera Warriors)
- Founded: 28 August 1985; 41 years ago
- Ground: R. Soedrasono Stadium
- Capacity: 10,000
- Owner: PSSI Pasuruan Regency
- Manager: Gaung Andaka Ranggi Purbangkara
- Coach: Bio Paulin
- League: Liga Nusantara
- 2025–26: Liga Nusantara, Quarter-finals
Home colours	Away colours

Perserikatan Sepakbola Kabupaten Pasuruan (simply known as Persekabpas) is an Indonesian football club based in Pasuruan Regency, East Java. They currently compete in the Liga Nusantara. Their home stadium is Pogar Bangil Stadium.

== Players ==
=== Current squad ===
As of September 2026

Note: Flags indicate national team as defined under FIFA eligibility rules; some limited exceptions apply. Players may hold more than one non-FIFA nationality.

No.	Pos.	Nation	Player
1	GK	IDN	Zaki Ali Sapari
5	DF	IDN	Otávio Dutra
7	FW	IDN	Reynaldi Surya
8	MF	IDN	Dio Saputra
9	FW	IDN	Beto Gonçalves
10	MF	IDN	Nofi Atmaja
11	FW	IDN	Fawas Mahri
13	DF	IDN	Danie Pratama (captain)
15	DF	IDN	Wendi Firmansah
16	MF	IDN	Riski Praganta
18	DF	IDN	Edy Wardan
19	MF	IDN	Sarbini Huszein
20	DF	IDN	Marcell Januar
21	MF	IDN	Zanuar Ardani
23	DF	IDN	Wahyu Zhacky
25	GK	IDN	Sahrul Adhitya
26	DF	IDN	Muhammad Sulton
29	GK	IDN	Fajar Arkananta
33	FW	IDN	Deco Saputra
57	FW	IDN	Brian Rejau

No.	Pos.	Nation	Player
68	MF	IDN	Richardo Irsandi
77	MF	IDN	Aunur Rofik
88	MF	IDN	Achmad Assamawi
96	GK	IDN	Chalvin Hidayat
99	FW	IDN	Ali Mashori
—	GK	IDN	Dhika Bayangkara
—	GK	IDN	Zidan Afreza
—	DF	IDN	Dandi Maulana
—	DF	IDN	Dion Mefahmi
—	DF	IDN	Fiwi Dwipan
—	DF	IDN	Joko Susilo
—	DF	IDN	Sugiyanto Rohman
—	MF	IDN	Bayu Gatra
—	MF	IDN	Hamsa Lestaluhu
—	MF	IDN	Manzila Fizal
—	MF	IDN	Mido Hossem
—	MF	IDN	Qaqa Basham
—	FW	IDN	Abdul Hamid
—	FW	IDN	Beri Santoso
—	FW	IDN	Mohammad Rifki
—	FW	IDN	Osvaldo Haay

== Season by season records ==
Season	League/Division	Teams	Pos.	Piala Indonesia	AFC competition(s)
2003	Second Division	28	1	–	–
2004	First Division	24	4th, West division	–	–
2005	Premier Division	28	6th, West division	Second round	–
2006	Premier Division	28	Semi-final	First round	–
2007–08	Premier Division	36	16th, East division	Quarter-final	–
2008–09	Premier Division	29	14th, East division	First round	–
2009–10	First Division	51	4th, First round	–	–
2010	First Division	57	3rd, First round	–	–
2011–12	First Division	66	4th, First round	–	–
2013	First Division	77	First round	–	–
2014	First Division	73	3rd, Second round	–	–
2015	Liga Nusantara	season abandoned		–	–
2016	ISC Liga Nusantara	32		–	–
2017	Liga 3	32	Round of 16	–	–
2018	Liga 3	32	Eliminated in Regional round	Second round	–
2019	Liga 3	32	Eliminated in Regional round	Second round	–
2020	Liga 3	season abandoned		–	–
2021–22	Liga 3	64	Eliminated in Provincial round	–	–
2022–23	Liga 3	season abandoned		–	–
2023–24	Liga 3	80	4th, Fourth round	–	–
2024–25	Liga Nusantara	16	3rd, Championship round	–	–
2025–26	Liga Nusantara	24	Quarter-finalist	–	–
2026–27	Liga Nusantara	24	TBD	–	–

== Honours ==
- Liga Indonesia Second Division

- Champion (1): 2003

== Notable former players ==
=== Foreign ===
- (Liberia) Zah Rahan Krangar
- (Chile) Francisco Rotunno

=== Local ===
- Beny Wahyudi
- I Gede Sukadana
- Nehemia Solossa
- Patrich Wanggai
- Purwaka Yudhi
