= Danie Pratama =

Indonesian footballer

Personal information
- Full name: Danie Pratama
- Date of birth: 4 November 1995 (age 31)
- Place of birth: Bandar Lampung, Indonesia
- Height: 1.81 m (5 ft 11 in)
- Position: Defender

Team information
- Current team: Persekabpas Pasuruan
- Number: 13

Youth career
- 2012–2013: Sleman United
- 2013–2015: PSS Sleman
- 2016: PS TNI

Senior career*
Years	Team	Apps	(Gls)
2017	PS TNI	1	(0)
2017–2018	PSMS Medan	11	(1)
2019	Persiba Balikpapan	5	(0)
2020	Persela Lamongan	0	(0)
2021–2022	Sulut United	6	(0)
2022	→ Sada Sumut (loan)	3	(0)
2023–2025	Nusantara Lampung	2	(0)
2025–	Persekabpas Pasuruan	10	(0)
- * Club domestic league appearances and goals as of 4 January 2026

Danie Pratama (born 4 November 1995) is an Indonesian professional footballer who plays as a defender for Liga Nusantara club Persekabpas Pasuruan.

== Club career ==
Danie began to like football since childhood by entering SSB AM TRI then joined with several clubs PSST TRIDADI, SU, PORDA SLEMAN and PSS Sleman.

Danie joined the PS TNI club in the 2017 Liga 1.

In mid July 2017, Danie was released from PS TNI and joined PSMS Medan who competed in 2017 Liga 2.

== Honours ==
=== Club ===
PS TNI U-21

- Indonesia Soccer Championship U-21: 2016

PSMS Medan

- Liga 2 runner-up: 2017
