= De Red F.C. =

Indonesian football club

de Red
- Full name: de Red Football Club
- Nickname: The Red Bulls
- Short name: RED
- Founded: 2018; 8 years ago, as Dejan; 2026; 0 years ago, as de Red
- Ground: Gelora 10 November Stadium
- Capacity: 20,000
- Owner: Indonesian Democratic Party of Struggle East Java Regional Leadership
- CEO: David Rohi
- Head coach: Aji Santoso
- League: Championship
- 2025–26: Liga Nusantara, Runner-up (promoted)
Home colours	Away colours	Third colours

de Red Football Club, formerly known as Dejan, is an Indonesian professional football club based in Surabaya, East Java. The club will be playing in the Championship, the second tier division of Indonesia football, following a promotion from the 2025–26 Liga Nusantara as the runner-up. They play their home matches at Gelora 10 November Stadium in Tambaksari.

== History ==
Dejan was originally an amateur football club, debuting in the Liga 3 West Java Series 1 in the 2022–23 season. They made it to the final but lost to Persipasi Kota Bekasi 1–0.

In the following season, Dejan only finished 3rd in group B and failed to advance to the second round. However, due their performance in the previous season, Dejan earned a ticket to the national round of the top 80 in the 2023–24 season. The results were quite positive, they won 2–0 against TS Saiburai on 29 April 2024, and 5–0 over PS Palembang on 5 May 2024, followed by a draw against Perse Ende with a score of 3–3 two days later.

These result brought Dejan through to the round of 32. In the first match they successfully defeated the 2023 Liga 3 Central Java champions Persip Pekalongan with a final score of 2–1. After being held to a 2–2 draw against PSGC Ciamis, Dejan ensured qualification for the round of 16 after winning 4–1 over Persikasi Bekasi on 15 May 2024.

In the round of 16, Dejan joined in group C. They won their first match 1–0 against Persipani Paniai on 21 May 2024. Later they were held to a 1–1 draw against Persipasi Bekasi on 23 May 2024, until Dejan secured qualification for the last 8 after a 1–0 win over Tornado two days later. In the round of 8, Dejan joined in group 1, and competed with Persekabpas Pasuruan, Persikas Subang, and Adhyaksa Farmel. Dejan secured their promotion to the Liga 2 next season after beating Persekabpas 3–0 and Persikas 2–0. On 26 July 2024, Dejan officially announced the change of its team logo.

In the 2026 PSSI Ordinary Congress, Dejan officially changed their name to de Red FC. They also moved their homebase from Depok to Surabaya. This was done after the club's ownership was transferred to the East Java Regional Leadership of the Indonesian Democratic Party of Struggle. Subsequently, de Red appointed Aji Santoso as their inaugural head coach.

== Supporters ==
Dejan supporters are called Careguard Boys 12.

== Name and logo changes ==
=== Logo history ===
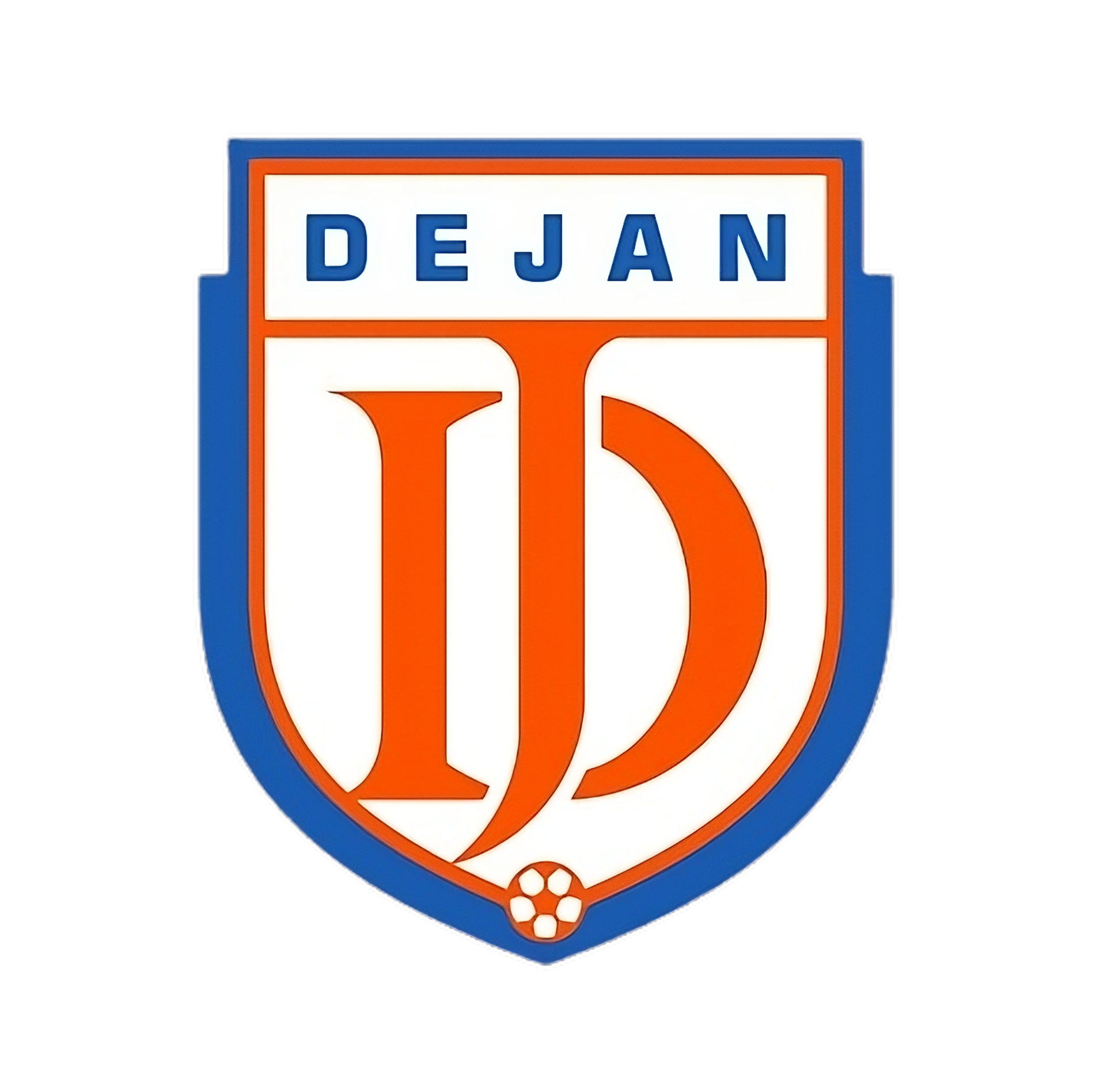
Dejan (2024–2026)

de Red (2026–present)

=== Naming history ===
- Dejan (2018–2026)
- de Red (2026–present)

== Players ==
=== Current squad ===
As of September 2026

Note: Flags indicate national team as defined under FIFA eligibility rules; some limited exceptions apply. Players may hold more than one non-FIFA nationality.

No.	Pos.	Nation	Player
2	DF	IDN	Rizky Dwi Nugraha
6	MF	IDN	Ahmad Fahd
8	MF	IDN	Fava Sheva
9	FW	IDN	Riski Ramadhan
10	FW	BRA	Fellipe Veloso
11	FW	IDN	Giofani
12	GK	IDN	Ruben Rafli
13	DF	IDN	Irvan Febrianto
14	MF	IDN	Ji Da-bin
17	FW	IDN	Ryanata Yoga
18	DF	BRA	Keven Alleson
19	MF	IDN	Muhammad Sadewa
21	FW	IDN	Titan Agung
22	FW	IDN	Hanis Sagara Putra
23	DF	IDN	Wisal El Burji
24	MF	IDN	Atha Jabrani

No.	Pos.	Nation	Player
25	FW	IDN	Kahar Kalu Muzakkar
26	MF	IDN	Hattam Pratama
27	DF	IDN	Rayhan Putra Bayu
28	MF	IDN	Braif Fatari
37	DF	IDN	Achmad Riyadi
53	MF	BRA	Dimitri Lima
54	FW	IDN	Mochammad Supriadi
64	FW	IDN	Umar Thoriq
66	DF	IDN	Irwanto Bajo
69	GK	IDN	Fajar Ali Syahbana
75	GK	IDN	Panggih Prio
78	MF	IDN	Danial El Zeno
79	MF	IDN	Genta Alparedo
88	MF	IDN	Abdul Aziz
92	GK	IDN	Dimas Galih Pratama
93	DF	IDN	Rical Vieri
97	MF	IDN	Adam Maulana

== Coaching staff ==
Position	Staff
Head coach	(Indonesia) Aji Santoso
Assistant coach	(Indonesia) Bambang Danur Dara (Indonesia) Hartono (Indonesia) Anies Septyawan (Indonesia) Redi Surpiyanto
Goalkeeper coach	(Indonesia) Benyamin van Breukelen
Physical coach	(Indonesia) Devid Prisma Nugraha
Team manager	(Indonesia)
Analysis	(Indonesia)
Doctor	(Indonesia) Dr. Ahmad Ridhoi
Masseur	(Indonesia) Vino Eky Findito
Kitman	(Indonesia) Mulyanto Sataphong (Indonesia) Maulana Hasyim Soekarno
Physiotherapist	(Indonesia) Yoga Rasta Aditya (Indonesia) Zulio Hidayatur Rohkman

== Season-by-season records ==
As Dejan

Season	League/Division	Tms.	Pos.	Piala Indonesia
2022–23	Liga 3	season abandoned		–
2023–24	Liga 3	80	2nd, fourth round	–
2024–25	Liga 2	26	3rd, relegation round	–
2025–26	Liga Nusantara	24	2nd	–

As de Red

Season	League/Division	Tms.	Pos.	Piala Indonesia	I-League Cup
2026–27	Championship	20	TBD	–	TBD

- 1 seasons in Championship
- 1 seasons in Liga 2 (defunct)
- 1 season in Liga Nusantara
- 2 season in Liga 3 (defunct)

== Honours ==
- Liga 3 West Java Series 1
  - Runners-up (1): 2022
- Liga Nusantara
  - Runners-up (1): 2026
