= Elthon Maran =

Indonesian association footballer

Personal information
- Full name: Aliazer Thoncy Elthon Maran
- Date of birth: 6 April 1989 (age 37)
- Place of birth: Manokwari, Indonesia
- Height: 1.65 m (5 ft 5 in)
- Position: Winger

Youth career
- 2007: SSB Mansinam Manokwari

Senior career*
Years	Team	Apps	(Gls)
2007–2009	Persewon Wondama		
2010–2011	PSIM Yogyakarta	25	(4)
2011–2013	Persiram Raja Ampat	53	(10)
2014	Gresik United	6	(1)
2014–2015	Persiram Raja Ampat	12	(0)
2016–2017	Madura United	31	(5)
2017	Sragen United	8	(3)
2017	PSMS Medan	8	(1)
2018	Semen Padang	22	(1)
2019	Kalteng Putra	17	(1)
2020–2021	Sulut United	0	(0)
2021	Muba Babel United	6	(0)
2022	Persekat Tegal	2	(0)
- * Club domestic league appearances and goals as of 1 October 2022

Aliazer Thoncy Elthon Maran or just Elthon Maran (born 6 April 1989) is an Indonesian professional footballer who plays as a winger.

== Club career ==
=== Kalteng Putra ===
In 2019, Elthon Maran signed a contract with Indonesian Liga 1 club Kalteng Putra. He made his league debut on 3 July 2019 in a match against Borneo. On 10 November 2019, Elthon Maran scored his first goal for Kalteng Putra against PSM Makassar in the 5th minute at the Tuah Pahoe Stadium, Palangkaraya.

=== Sulut United ===
He was signed for Sulut United to play in Liga 2 in the 2020 season. This season was suspended on 27 March 2020 due to the COVID-19 pandemic. The season was abandoned and was declared void on 20 January 2021.

=== Muba Babel United ===
In 2021, Maran signed a contract with Indonesian Liga 2 club Muba Babel United. He made his league debut on 6 October against Sriwijaya at the Gelora Sriwijaya Stadium, Palembang.

== Honours ==
=== Club ===
PSMS Medan

- Liga 2 runner-up: 2017
