= Yogi Novrian =

Indonesian association footballer

Personal information
- Full name: Muhammad Yogi Novrian
- Date of birth: November 13, 1994 (age 31)
- Place of birth: Palembang, Indonesia
- Height: 1.72 m (5 ft 8 in)
- Position: Winger

Team information
- Current team: Sriwijaya

Youth career
- 2011–2014: Sriwijaya

Senior career*
| Years | Team | Apps | (Gls) |
| 2015 | Persela Lamongan | 2 | (0) |
| 2016 | Sriwijaya | 0 | (0) |
| 2017 | Persebaya Surabaya | 14 | (3) |
| 2018 | Semeru | 7 | (1) |
| 2019 | PSPS Riau | 6 | (1) |
| 2020–2022 | Persiba Balikpapan | 10 | (4) |
| 2024–2025 | Persikabo 1973 | 1 | (0) |
| 2025– | Sriwijaya | 0 | (0) |
- * Club domestic league appearances and goals

Muhammad Yogi Novrian (born November 13, 1994) is an Indonesian professional footballer who plays as a winger for Liga 2 club Sriwijaya.

== Honours ==
=== Club ===
Sriwijaya U-21

- Indonesia Super League U-21: 2012–13

Persebaya Surabaya

- Liga 2: 2017
