= Hardiantono =

Indonesian footballer

Personal information
- Full name: Hardiantono
- Date of birth: 26 June 1989 (age 37)
- Place of birth: Medan, Indonesia
- Height: 1.77 m (5 ft 9 1/2 in)
- Position: Defender

Senior career*
Years	Team	Apps	(Gls)
2015–2017	PS TNI	30	(3)
2017–2018	PSMS Medan	26	(0)
- * Club domestic league appearances and goals as of 2 June 2016

Hardiantono (born 26 June 1989) is an Indonesian professional footballer who plays as a defender.

== Career ==
He made his professional debut against Madura United F.C. in first week 2016 Indonesia Soccer Championship A.
