= Djadjang Nurdjaman =

Indonesian association football player and coach

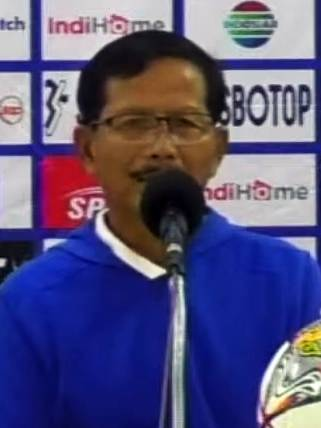
- Djadjang in December 2022

Personal information
- Full name: Djadjang Nurdjaman
- Date of birth: 30 March 1959 (age 67)
- Place of birth: Majalengka, Indonesia
- Height: 1.62 m (5 ft 4 in)
- Positions: Winger; attacking midfielder

Team information
- Current team: Persib Bandung (technical director)

Youth career
- 1977–1979: Persib Bandung

Senior career*
Years	Team	Apps	(Gls)
1979–1982	Sari Bumi Raya		
1982–1985	Mercu Buana Medan		
1985–1994	Persib Bandung		

Managerial career
- 2007–2008: Persib Bandung (caretaker)
- 2011: Pelita Jaya (caretaker)
- 2012–2016: Persib Bandung
- 2016–2017: Persib Bandung
- 2017–2018: PSMS Medan
- 2018–2019: Persebaya Surabaya
- 2019–2021: Barito Putera
- 2022–2023: Persikabo 1973
- 2023–2024: Persela Lamongan
- 2024: Persikabo 1973
- 2024–2025: Gresik United
- * Club domestic league appearances and goals

Djadjang Nurdjaman (born 30 March 1959), also known as Djanur, is an Indonesian professional football coach and former player who is the technical director of Super League club Persib Bandung.

In his playing days, Djadjang spent most of his years playing for Persib. One of the club's stars in the 1980s and 1990s, Djadjang helped the club win three Perserikatan titles. As a coach, he would also win two more top-flight titles with the club, the 1994–95 Liga Indonesia Premier Division as assistant coach and the 2014 Indonesia Super League as head coach.

== Playing career ==
=== Early years ===
At the age of 17, Djadjang joined Persib Bandung's youth structure. There, he would work his way into the senior squad and train with the likes of Henry Kiswanto, Encas Tonif, and Max Timisela. Djadjang would also feature recurringly in first-team matches, playing as an attacking midfielder though he tends to play in the right wing.

=== Galatama years ===
In 1979, with Persib relegated to the Perserikatan First Division, Djadjang accepted an approach to move to the newly formed Galatama, joining Sari Bumi Raya who were based in Bandung. He would stay with the club as they moved their home base to Yogyakarta. In 1982, Djadjang joined Mercu Buana Medan. He would play for the club until it disbanded in 1985.

=== Persib Bandung ===
After Mercu Buana disbanded, Djadjang decided to return to Bandung and was immediately called into Nandar Iskandar's Persib squad for the 1986 Perserikatan season. Persib would win the title by beating Perseman Manokwari 1–0 in the final with Djadjang scoring the winning goal in the 77th minute. After the match, Djadjang was crowded by tens of thousands of Bobotoh (Persib Bandung supporters). "It was a moment that I would never forget in my entire life", said Djadjang about the match.

In 1990, Persib won another Perserikatan title. Like 1986, Djadjang had a major contribution in the final with his cross assisting Dede Rosadi for Persib's second goal in their 2–0 final triumph over Persebaya Surabaya.

After winning the 1993–94 Perserikatan title with Persib, Djadjang retired as a football player.

== Coaching career ==
After retiring, Djadjang joined Persib's coaching staff when he became assistant coach to Indra Thohir in 1994 and part of the 1994–95 Premier Division winning side. After that, Djadjang started coaching Persib's U-23 side for a while before he was again appointed assistant coach to accompany Arcan Iurie in 2006. Following Iurie's departure, Djadjang had a brief stint as Persib joint caretaker head coach alongside his former teammate and captain Robby Darwis in the 2007–08 season. At the end of his caretaker stint, he accepted a role as assistant coach at Pelita Jaya under Fandi Ahmad. In 2011, Djadjang was appointed as Pelita Jaya's caretaker head coach after Fandi Ahmad left the club. He managed to save the club from relegation before returning to his previous role under newly appointed head coach Rahmad Darmawan.

=== Return to Persib ===
==== 2012–13: Adjusting period ====
On 13 August 2012, Persib appointed Djadjang as the team's new head coach in a closed meeting at Holiday Inn Bandung. He had the tough task of winning Persib their first top-flight title since 1995. To help prepare the team, Djadjang hired some of his colleagues from the 1994–95 title triumph into his coaching staff, namely Sutiono Lamso and Asep Sumantri as assistant coaches and Anwar Sanusi as goalkeeping coach. Djadjang's former head coach, Indra Thohir also joined the backroom staff as technical director. In preseason, Persib took part in the Celebes Cup II tournament held in the city of Bandung. Persib won the tournament after beating Sriwijaya FC in the final 1–0. Persib had a solid season in the 2013 Indonesia Super League, finishing the season in fourth place.

==== 2014: Indonesia Super League win ====
Ahead of the 2014 season, Djadjang was still the team's head coach, this time he invited Herrie Setyawan, Asep Soemantri, and Anwar Sanusi as assistant coaches. For this season, Persib filled their foreign player quota with Vladimir Vujović, Djibril Coulibaly, and Makan Konaté. Preseason began with a 1–1 draw with Persib U-21. Then Persib had several other friendlies before taking part in the 2014 Indonesia Inter Island Cup. They managed to reach the final before the match was delayed until 2015 due to the match not getting a security permit. Persib would also have a friendly with Dutch side Ajax Amsterdam with the match ending in a 1–1 draw.

In the 2014 Indonesia Super League, Persib finished second in the Western Group with 41 points and advanced to the second round. In the second round, Persib topped Group B with 13 points and went through the semifinals. They would face off against Western Group winners Arema Cronus in the semifinal and beat them 3–1 after extra time with late goals from Vladimir Vujović, Atep Rizal, and Makan Konaté sending Persib to the final. Djadjang would succeed in bringing Persib the title with a 5–3 penalty shootout win over Persipura Jayapura after the match ended 2–2 in 120 minutes. It was also a personal achievement for Djadjang, namely for winning the top-flight title with Persib as a player, assistant coach, and head coach.

==== 2015: League suspension and President's Cup win ====
In 2015, Djadjang underwent his third season as Persib head coach. In the long-delayed 2014 Inter Island Cup Final, Persib lost 2–1 to Arema. At the 2015 Indonesia Super League, Persib won their first two matches before the league was stopped because PSSI was frozen by FIFA for government interference. On the continental stage, Persib suffered a 4–0 defeat away at Hanoi T&T in their AFC Champions League preliminary round 2 match, meaning they would enter the AFC Cup group stage. In the AFC Cup, Persib won their group and qualified for the round of 16 only to lose 0–2 to Kitchee SC.

With no league matches, Persib took part in the 2015 Indonesia President's Cup, a tournament created to fill the lack of league competition. Persib would win the title by beating Sriwijaya FC 2–0 in the final. The win was another great moment for Djadjang as he returned to a final held in Gelora Bung Karno Stadium for the first time in 20 years and this time as head coach.

==== 2016: Coach training in Italy and ISC A ====
For several months in 2016, Djadjang went into coach training in Italy as part of a partnership between Persib Bandung and Italian side Inter Milan. While he was away, Persib hired Dejan Antonić as the team's head coach in his absence. However, Djadjang's training program ended early as Persib decided to return him to his coaching post immediately on 29 June 2016 due to subpar performances under Antonić (who resigned on 11 June 2016) and caretaker Herrie Setyawan in the 2016 Indonesia Soccer Championship A. Persib consolidated and finished the season in fifth place.

==== 2017: Decline and resignation ====
In preparation for the 2017 Liga 1 campaign, Persib made some big-name signings that signalled their established status as two former Premier League players joined the club. Former Chelsea, Real Madrid, and AC Milan player, Michael Essien, joined from Panathinaikos while another former Chelsea player Carlton Cole joined as a free agent. Before their arrival, Persib had made other signings with the likes of Ciro Alpes, Imam Murahidal D, and Semarang attacking midfielder Muhammad Agung Divyatma coming into the squad. Dutch-born Indonesian midfielder also joined at the time of the team launching on 2 April 2017. Persib participated in the 2017 Indonesia President's Cup as the defending champions. They would finish in third place after losing to PSM Makassar in the semifinals and winning the third-place playoff against Semen Padang.

Persib had a poor start to the season, winning only one of their first five matches. They followed this by collecting 20 points from the first 15 matches, scoring only 14 goals. The team's poor form was summed up by Carlton Cole being released by the club on 13 July 2017 after starting only two of his five appearances, scoring none. Finally, on 15 July 2017, Djadjang officially resigned as Persib head coach after he was disappointed that he could not boost the team's performance.

=== PSMS Medan ===
On 14 September 2017, Djadjang was appointed as PSMS Medan head coach. With the club already in the Liga 2 second round at his appointment, Djadjang was tasked to get the club promoted immediately. Under his leadership, PSMS achieved promotion following their 2–0 win after extra time against PSIS Semarang in the playoff semifinal. The club would eventually lose the final to Persebaya Surabaya after extra time, finishing as runners-up. PSMS had tough start on their top-flight return. The club lost eight of their first 13 matches and at one point, had the worst goalscoring record in the league. On 13 July 2018, Djadjang was sacked by PSMS with the club sitting bottom of the league halfway through the season.

=== Persebaya Surabaya ===
On 25 August 2018, Persebaya Surabaya appointed Djadjang as their new head coach. In his guidance, Persebaya managed to steer clear of the relegation places and finish the season in the top five. At the start of the following year, the club reached the finals of the Indonesia President's Cup pre-season tournament, losing 4–2 on aggregate to Arema. After a poor run of results and fan protests against him, Persebaya dismissed Djadjang from coaching duties on 10 August 2019.

=== Barito Putera ===
Merely 11 days after his dismissal from Persebaya, Djadjang was appointed as the new head coach of Barito Putera. At the time of his appointment, the club were in 15th place and close to the relegation zone. Under Djadjang's guidance, Barito Putera managed to safely finish the season in 13th place. Due to the good impact he has on the squad, the club signed Djadjang on a three-year contract until 2022. On 14 December 2021, Djadjang was sacked by Barito Putera with the club only collecting 15 points from 17 matches into the new league season.

=== Persikabo 1973 ===
On 30 April 2022, Djadjang was officially hired as the head coach of Persikabo 1973. On 3 January 2023, Djadjang left his position by mutual consent.

=== Persela Lamongan ===
On 26 May 2023, Persela Lamongan announced Djadjang's appointment as their new head coach for the 2023–24 Liga 2 season.

== Personal life ==
Djadjang is married to Miranda Panggabean, daughter of Indonesian footballing legend Kamaruddin Panggabean. The couple have four daughters, Mira Nurmalia, Marlina Nurdjaman, Nabila Febiyanti, and Nadia Desvianti. They also have three granddaughters.

Djadjang's mother died at the age of 88 in September 2013 while he and Persib were playing in Papua.

== Honours ==
=== Player ===
Persib Bandung

- Perserikatan: 1986, 1989–90, 1993–94

=== Head coach ===
Persib Bandung

- Indonesia Super League: 2014
- Indonesia President's Cup 2015: third place 2017

PSMS Medan

- Liga 2 runner-up: 2017

Persebaya Surabaya

- Indonesia President's Cup runner-up: 2019

=== Individual ===
- Liga 2 Best coach : 2023–24

== Managerial statistics ==
As of 1 March 2025

Managerial record by team and tenure
Team	Nat.	From	To	Record					Ref.
Team	Nat.	From	To	G	W	D	L	Win %	Ref.
Persib Bandung	(Indonesia)	13 August 2012	15 July 2017	105	54	27	24	51.43	
PSMS Medan	(Indonesia)	14 September 2017	13 July 2018	26	11	1	14	42.31	
Persebaya Surabaya	(Indonesia)	25 August 2018	10 August 2019	34	17	8	9	50.00	
Barito Putera	(Indonesia)	21 August 2019	14 December 2021	38	13	8	17	34.21	
Persikabo 1973	(Indonesia)	30 April 2022	3 January 2023	17	6	5	6	35.29	
Persela Lamongan	(Indonesia)	26 May 2023	7 February 2024	18	9	5	4	50.00	
Persikabo 1973	(Indonesia)	11 March 2024	31 October 2024	14	2	0	12	14.29	
Gresik United	(Indonesia)	5 November 2024	1 March 2025	16	7	4	5	43.75	
Career Total				268	119	58	91	44.40	
