= Irvan Febrianto =

Indonesian association footballer

Personal information
- Full name: Mochammad Irvan Febrianto
- Date of birth: 9 October 1996 (age 30)
- Place of birth: Kediri, Indonesia
- Height: 1.64 m (5 ft 5 in)
- Position: Full-back

Team information
- Current team: De Red
- Number: 13

Senior career*
Years	Team	Apps	(Gls)
2017–2018	Persebaya Surabaya	23	(0)
2019–2022	Persiba Balikpapan	13	(0)
2019	→ Babel United (loan)	8	(0)
2022–2023	Persita Tangerang	1	(0)
2023	Gresik United	3	(0)
2024–2025	Persiku Kudus	17	(0)
2026–	De Red	1	(0)
- * Club domestic league appearances and goals as of 25 September 2026

Mochammad Irvan Febrianto (born 9 October 1996) is an Indonesian professional footballer who plays as a full-back for Championship club De Red.

== Honours ==
=== Club ===
Persebaya Surabaya

- Liga 2: 2017
