= Irvan Williams =

Australian rules footballer, born 1908

Personal information
- Full name: Irvan Spencer Williams
- Born: 20 January 1908; Geelong
- Died: 17 October 1974 (aged 66); Hawthorn, Victoria
- Original team: Devnish
- Height: 183 cm (6 ft 0 in)
- Weight: 77 kg (170 lb)

Playing career^{1}
Years	Club	Games (Goals)
1931	Hawthorn	1 (0)
- ^{1} Playing statistics correct to the end of 1931.

Irvan Spencer Williams (20 January 1908 – 17 October 1974) was an Australian rules footballer who played a single game with Hawthorn in the Victorian Football League (VFL) in 1931.
