= Donni Dio Hasibuan =

Indonesian footballer

Donni Hasibuan
Personal information
- Full name: Donni Dio Hasibuan
- Date of birth: March 23, 1998 (age 28)
- Place of birth: Baganbatu, Indonesia
- Height: 1.70 m (5 ft 7 in)
- Position: Midfielder

Youth career
- 2015: Pro Duta
- 2016: Sinar Medan

Senior career*
Years	Team	Apps	(Gls)
2017–2019	PSMS Medan	17	(0)
2022	Persiraja Banda Aceh	3	(0)
- * Club domestic league appearances and goals as of 1 October 2022

Donni Dio Hasibuan (born March 23, 1998) is an Indonesian professional footballer who plays as a midfielder.

== Career ==
=== Early career ===
Donni started his football career from SSB Sinar Sakti, then SSB Cikal Garuda, PSMS Junior, and PPLP Sumut. He was elected to be the best player in the PSMS club campus.

== Personal life ==
Donni was born in Baganbatu, the first child of two brothers his parents named Ari Hasibuan and Neng Hayati.
