= Rifan Nahumarury =

Indonesian association footballer

Personal information
- Full name: Rifan Nahumarury
- Date of birth: 21 November 1994 (age 31)
- Place of birth: Tulehu, Indonesia
- Height: 1.70 m (5 ft 7 in)
- Position: Winger

Youth career
- 2011–2012: Deportivo Indonesia
- 2012–2013: Sriwijaya

Senior career*
Years	Team	Apps	(Gls)
2013–2014	Sriwijaya	5	(0)
2017	Martapura	21	(8)
2018–2021	Mitra Kukar	36	(3)
2022	Kalteng Putra	3	(0)
2023	Persijap Jepara	5	(0)
2023–2024	Persipa Pati	9	(0)
- * Club domestic league appearances and goals as of 6 February 2024

Rifan Nahumarury (born 21 November 1994) is an Indonesian professional footballer who plays as a winger.

== Club career ==
=== Martapura ===
In 2017, Rifan Nahumarury signed a contract with Liga 2 club Martapura. He made 21 league appearances and scored 8 goals for Martapura.

=== Mitra Kukar ===
In 2018, Rifan signed a year contract with Mitra Kukar to play in Liga 1 in the 2018 season. He made his league debut on 24 March 2018 in a match against Arema at the Kanjuruhan Stadium, Malang.
