= Roni Fatahillah =

Indonesian footballer

Personal information
- Full name: Roni Fatahillah
- Date of birth: 7 November 1993 (age 33)
- Place of birth: Garut, Indonesia
- Height: 1.85 m (6 ft 1 in)
- Position: Centre back

Senior career*
Years	Team	Apps	(Gls)
2010–2011	PSGL Gayo Lues	7	(0)
2011–2014	PS Kwarta Deli	26	(1)
2015	Gresik United	0	(0)
2016	PSMS Medan	0	(0)
2017	Persibangga Purbalingga	14	(0)
2017–2018	PSMS Medan	24	(1)
2019	Mitra Kukar	15	(0)
2020	Persela Lamongan	1	(0)
2021	Sulut United	2	(0)
2021	PSPS Riau	4	(0)
2022–2023	Nusantara United	7	(0)
- * Club domestic league appearances and goals as of 1 October 2022

Roni Fatahillah (born 7 November 1993) is an Indonesian professional footballer who plays as a central defender.

== Club career ==
Roni started his football career with PS Kwarta Deli Serdang club then moved to Gresik United and in 2016 he joined PSMS Medan.

In 2017, he played with PSMS Medan in Liga 2 and they managed to be runner-up 2017 Liga 2 as well as a club promotion to 2018 Liga 1.

== Honours ==
=== Club ===
PS Kwarta Deli Serdang

- Liga Indonesia First Division: 2013

PSMS Medan

- Liga 2 runner-up: 2017
- Piala Presiden 4th position: 2018
