= 2017 Liga 2 (Indonesia) =

Liga 2
- Season: 2017
- Dates: 19 April – 28 November 2017
- Champions: Persebaya (3rd title)
- Promoted: Persebaya; PSMS; PSIS
- Relegated: 40 teams: 757 Kepri Jaya; PSBL; Persih; Pro Duta (DQ); Persikad; PS Bengkulu; Lampung Sakti; Persikabo; Persibas; Persip; Persijap; Persibangga; Sragen United; PPSM; Persipon; Persiba Bantul; Persatu; Persinga; Madiun Putra; PSBI; Persewangi; Perssu; Persida; PS Badung; PS West Sumbawa; Persekap; Persigubin; Persbul; Persifa (DQ); Persepam; Celebest; Yahukimo; Persik; PS Timah BaBel; PSGC; Persekam Metro; Perseka Manokwari; PSCS; PSBK; Persipur
- Matches: 459
- Goals: 1,140 (2.48 per match)
- Best player: Irfan Jaya
- Top goalscorer: Rivaldi Bawuo (17 goals)
- Biggest home win: PSPS 6–0 Persih (22 July 2017); Martapura 6–0 Persiwa (9 October 2017)
- Biggest away win: Persih 0–7 Persiraja (19 August 2017)
- Highest scoring: PSIS 6–4 Martapura (28 November 2017)
- Longest winning run: 9 games PSS
- Longest unbeaten run: 17 games Persebaya
- Longest winless run: 13 games Persiba Bantul
- Longest losing run: 12 games Persih

The 2017 Liga 2 was the inaugural season of the Liga 2 under its current name, and the eighth season under its current league structure.

Persebaya won the title after a 3–2 win over PSMS in the final at Gelora Bandung Lautan Api Stadium, Bandung on 28 November 2017.

== Overview ==
=== Player regulations ===
Starting this season Liga 2 was an under-25 tournament (born on or after 1 January 1992), with a maximum of five overage players allowed. Teams are no longer allowed to use foreign players and were allowed to have a maximum of 30 players.

=== Format ===
The league was divided into eight groups containing 7–8 teams each. The top two teams from each group qualified for the next round, while teams ranked fifth and below were relegated to the Liga 3. This arrangement was made to reduce the large number of participants (61) in 24 teams in the 2018 season.

== Teams ==
55 teams from the 2015 Liga Indonesia Premier Division were rejoined with four teams who pulled out from that season. Persebaya Surabaya, previously not recognized, also participated this season.

=== Name changes ===
- Villa 2000 was changed to Celebest after moving their homebase from South Tangerang to Palu in January 2016.
- Persigo was changed to Semeru after moving their homebase from Gorontalo to Lumajang in January 2017.
- Bintang Jaya Asahan merged with YSK 757 Karimun to become 757 Kepri Jaya after moving their homebase from Asahan to Batam in February 2017.
- Persires Sukoharjo was changed to Lampung Sakti after moving their homebase from Sukoharjo to Bandar Lampung in February 2017.
- Laga was changed to Sragen United after moving their homebase from Surabaya to Sragen on 27 February 2017.
- Persebo was changed to Madura after moving their homebase from Bondowoso to Sumenep in March 2017.
- PS Bangka changed their name to PS Timah Babel in April 2017.
- Perseka changed their name to Perseka Manokwari after moving their homebase from Kaimana to Manokwari in July 2017.

=== Stadium and locations ===
Locations of the 2017 Liga 2 teams
Java Liga 2 football teams

Team	Location	Stadium	Capacity
757 Kepri Jaya	Batam	Gelora Citramas	600
Celebest	Palu	Gawalise	20,000
Cilegon United	Cilegon	Krakatau Steel	25,000
Kalteng Putra	Palangka Raya	Tuah Pahoe	5,000
Lampung Sakti	Bandar Lampung	Sumpah Pemuda	15,000
Madiun Putra	Madiun	Wilis	25,000
Madura	Sumenep	Ahmad Yani	15,000
Martapura	Martapura	Demang Lehman	15,000
Persatu	Tuban	Lokajaya	2,000
Persebaya	Surabaya	Gelora Bung Tomo	55,000
Persekam Metro	Malang	Kanjuruhan	42,449
Persekap	Pasuruan	Untung Suropati	5,000
Persepam	Pamekasan	Gelora Bangkalan	15,000
Perserang	Serang	Maulana Yusuf	15,000
Persewangi	Banyuwangi	Diponegoro	10,000
Persiba Bantul	Bantul	Sultan Agung	30,000
Persibangga	Purbalingga	Goentoer Darjono	15,000
Persibas	Purwokerto	Satria	8,000
Persibat	Batang	Moh Sarengat	15,000
Persida	Sidoarjo	Gelora Delta	35,000
Persigo Semeru	Lumajang	Semeru	3,000
Persih	Tembilahan	Beringin	5,000
Persijap	Jepara	Gelora Bumi Kartini	25,000
Persik	Kediri	Brawijaya	20,000
Persika	Karawang	Singaperbangsa	25,000
Persikabo	Cibinong	Pakansari	30,000
Persikad	Depok	Merpati	10,000
Persinga	Ngawi	Ketonggo	6,000
Persip	Pekalongan	Hoegeng	20,000
Persipon	Pontianak	Sultan Syarif Abdurrahman	15,000
Persipur	Purwodadi	Krida Bakti	12,000
Persiraja	Banda Aceh	Haji Dimurthala	20,000
Persis	Surakarta	Manahan	25,000
Persita	Serang	Maulana Yusuf	15,000
Perssu	Sumenep	Ahmad Yani	15,000
PPSM	Magelang	Moch. Soebroto	20,000
Pro Duta	Jakarta	Cendrawasih	5,000
PS Badung	Kuta	Gelora Samudera	5,000
PS Bengkulu	Bengkulu	Semarak	15,000
PS Timah Babel	Pangkal Pinang	Depati Amir	15,000
PS West Sumbawa	Mataram	December 17th	15,000
PSBI	Blitar	Aryo Srengat	6,000
PSBK	Blitar	Gelora Supriyadi	15,000
PSBL	Langsa	Langsa	8,000
PSCS	Cilacap	Wijayakusuma	15,000
PSGC	Ciamis	Galuh	10,000
PSIM	Bantul	Sultan Agung	30,000
PSIR	Rembang	Krida	7,000
PSIS	Semarang	Jatidiri	25,000
PSMP	Mojokerto	Gajahmada	10,000
PSMP	Surabaya	Bumimoro	10,000
PSMS	Medan	Teladan	20,000
PSPS Riau	Pekanbaru	Kaharudin Nasution	30,000
PSPS Riau	Pekanbaru	Riau Main	43,923
PSS	Sleman	Maguwoharjo	31,700
Sragen United	Sragen	Taruna (Note: When it's based in Sragen.)	5,000
Sragen United	Semarang	Citarum (Note: When it's based moved to Semarang.)	10,000
Home tournament held in Gelora Delta.
Persbul	Sidoarjo	Gelora Delta	35,000
Perseka Manokwari	Sidoarjo	Gelora Delta	35,000
Persifa	Sidoarjo	Gelora Delta	35,000
Persigubin	Sidoarjo	Gelora Delta	35,000
Persiwa	Sidoarjo	Gelora Delta	35,000
PSBS	Sidoarjo	Gelora Delta	35,000
Yahukimo	Sidoarjo	Gelora Delta	35,000

=== Personnel and kits ===
Note: Flags indicate national team as has been defined under FIFA eligibility rules. Players and coaches may hold more than one non-FIFA nationality.

Team	Head coach	Captain	Kit manufacturer	Shirt Sponsor(s)
757 Kepri Jaya	(Brazil) Jaino Matos	(Indonesia) Gerald Pangkali		Bintan Resorts, Club, Batamindo Investment Cakrawala, The Haven, Nirwana Gardens, Treasure Bay, Go-Jek, Indomie, Kinerja Pay, Citramas Group
Celebest	(Indonesia) Jafri Sastra	(Indonesia) Ryan Wiradinata		Indofood, Go-Jek, Mogu Mogu, Achilles, Bareksa, Corsa
Cilegon United	(Indonesia) Imam Riyadi	(Indonesia) Septian Andriansyah	CU Sport	Krakatau Posco, IPC, Part of Banten, Krakatau Steel, PT Cilegon Putra Mandala, Chandra Asri Petrochemical
Kalteng Putra	(Indonesia) Kas Hartadi	(Indonesia) Usep Munandar	MBB	Halo Dayak
Lampung Sakti	(Indonesia) Nova Arianto	(Indonesia) Erik Setiawan	Umbro	Sunpride, Sequis, Hometown Dairy, Bonanza Beef, Go-Jek, KBR, Yuhu!
Madiun Putra	(Indonesia) Sartono Anwar	(Indonesia) Asmar Abu	Kelme	Radar Madiun
Madura	(Indonesia) Salahudin	(Indonesia) Beny Ashar	Special One	De BAGCI Mall
Martapura	(Indonesia) Frans Sinatra	(Indonesia) Agus Cima	HNS Sports	Banjarmasin Post, Kalsa Tour, PT Karya Laskar Sultan Adam
Persatu	(Indonesia) Edy Sudiarto	(Indonesia) Dhanu Rosadhe	Gendoel Sport	Semen Gresik
Persbul	(Indonesia) Jufri Bakri	(Indonesia) Jefri Alfons Arsyad		
Persebaya	(Argentina) Alfredo Vera	(Indonesia) Rendi Irwan		Jawa Pos, Kapal Api, Antangin, Go-Jek, Honda
Perseka Manokwari	(Indonesia) M. Khaidir	(Indonesia) Budi Ohoimas		
Persekam Metro	(Indonesia) Siswantoro	(Indonesia) Setyo Adi Prastowo	Injers	Malang Kabupaten, Tirta Kanjuruhan
Persekap	(Indonesia) Asyari Cahyani	(Indonesia) Ali Khumaidi	Rabona	Radar Bromo
Persepam	(Indonesia) Suhaimi	(Indonesia) Fauzan Jamal	Special One	Said Abdullah Institut, De BAGCI Mall, BPR El-Baghraf Madura Berdikari
Perserang	(Indonesia) Zainal Abidin	(Indonesia) Agus Dani Akbar	HNS Sports	Pandeglang Raya Group
Persewangi	(Indonesia) Bagong Iswahyudi	(Indonesia) Nanda Pradana	QJ Apparel	Majestic Banyuwangi, Corsa, Go-Jek, PT Gajah Putih
Persiba Bantul	(Indonesia) Sambudiana	(Indonesia) Slamet Widodo	Reds!	Desa Mart, Corsa, Go-Jek
Persibangga	(Indonesia) Achmad Muhariyah	(Indonesia) Saptono	Salvo	
Persibas	(Indonesia) Nasal Mustofa	(Indonesia) Andesi Setyo	Calsie	
Persibat	(Indonesia) Daniel Roekito	(Indonesia) Tugi Hadi	DJ Sport	
Persida	(Indonesia) Zein Al Hadad	(Indonesia) Muhammad Fakhrudin	Nike	
Persigo Semeru	(Indonesia) Putut Wijanarko	(Indonesia) Reza Mustofa	Kelme	Manda Group, Nogosari Leather, Radar Semeru, Radar Jember, BeritaJatim.com, LumajangSatu.com
Persigubin	(Cameroon) Mial Armand	(Indonesia) Engelbertus Uropmabin		Bank Papua
Persih	(Indonesia) Yusran Sikumbang	(Indonesia) Firman Usman		
Persijap	(Brazil) Fernando Sales	(Indonesia) Abdul Hasyim	MBB	Inservica, Go-Jek
Persik	(Indonesia) Riono Asnan	(Indonesia) Slamet Sampurno	Rabona	Inter Sport, Go-Jek, Corsa, Cahya Yamaha
Persika	(Indonesia) Suimin Diharja	(Indonesia) Agus Supriyanto	MBB	Bank BJB
Persikabo	(Malaysia) Raja Isa	(Indonesia) Munadi	Elastico 7	Go-Jek
Persikad	(Indonesia) Liestiadi	(Indonesia) Ade Suhendra	QJ Apparel	Ascend, Trans Power, PT PBS
Persinga	(Indonesia) Mochamad Hasan	(Indonesia) Muhammad Zamnur	Sahaja	Radar Ngawi, Bank Jatim, Bima Sakti Perkasa
Persip	(Indonesia) Didik Listiyantoro	(Indonesia) Iwan Wahyudi	Oweltee	Kospin Jasa
Persipon	(Indonesia) Inyong Lolombulan	(Indonesia) Imam Subekti	Nike	Bank Kalbar, PDAM Tirta Khatulistiwa
Persipur	(Indonesia) Yazid Sungkar	(Indonesia) Heri Susilo	Clean sheet	
Persiraja	(Indonesia) Akhyar Ilyas	(Indonesia) Mukhlis Nakata	Oweltee	Bank Aceh Syariah
Persis	(Indonesia) Freddy Muli	(Indonesia) Agung Prasetyo	Saestu	Bank BRI, Go-Jek, Corsa, PT Syahdana Properti Nusantara, PT Kalimasadha Nusantara
Persita	(Indonesia) Bambang Nurdiansyah	(Indonesia) Egi Melgiansyah	MBB	PT Yasa Patria Perkasa
Persiwa	(Indonesia) Djoko Susilo	(Indonesia) Yesaya Desnam	Allvane	Pikeyro, JBB
Perssu	(Indonesia) Jamal Yastro	(Indonesia) Joko Sugiarto	MBB	Bank BPRS Bhakti Sumekar, Sumenep Super Mantap, Radar Madura, Karimata FM, Pamafert, U-Bay Love Bird, Cheers
PPSM	(Indonesia) Siswanto	(Indonesia) Patrick Domal	MBB	
Pro Duta	(Chile) Eladio Rojas	(Indonesia) Donny Siregar	Adidas	
PS Badung	(Indonesia) Nyoman Sujata	(Indonesia) Bayu Yusa		
PS Bengkulu	(Indonesia) Maman Suryaman	(Indonesia) Supriyadi	Twelve	Bank Bengkulu
PS Timah BaBel	(Indonesia) Sanusi Rahman	(Indonesia) Yogaspria Mirshadaq	Nike	PT Timah
PS West Sumbawa	(Indonesia) Hendri Susilo	(Indonesia) Saddam Husain	Junior Sport	
PSBI	(Indonesia) Feri Taufik	(Indonesia) Taufik Yanuarso	Oweltee	Graha Bangunan, Bank Jatim, Kebun Kopi Karanganyar, Bukit Bunda, Mie Jogging, Planet Goal
PSBK	(Indonesia) Bonggo Pribadi	(Indonesia) Deni Setiawan		Graha Bangunan
PSBL	Vacant	(Indonesia) Zulbahra		PT Jasa Mandiri Nusantara
PSBS	(Indonesia) Frengky Samay	(Indonesia) Patrias		
PSCS	(Indonesia) Jaya Hartono	(Indonesia) Jimmy Suparno	Calsie	Go-Jek, Bank Jateng, Corsa
PSGC	(Indonesia) Lukas Tumbuan	(Indonesia) Abdul Basid	MBB	Go-Jek, Bank BJB, Sumber Jaya, Cobek Beti
PSIM	(Indonesia) Erwan Hendarwanto	(Indonesia) Ahmad Taufiq	Kelme	Universitas Ahmad Dahlan, Go-Jek, Corsa, GudegNet, Mtrm! Merch, PD BPR Bank Jogja
PSIR	(Indonesia) Hadi Surento	(Indonesia) Heru Wibowo	MBB	PT Madani Jaya Mulia
PSIS	(Indonesia) Subangkit	(Indonesia) Johan Yoga	Vision of Superior	Go-Jek, Corsa, Suara Merdeka, SYS
PSMP	(Indonesia) Redi Supriyanto	(Indonesia) Mujib Ridwan	Town Apparel	Tugas Negara Bos
PSMS	(Indonesia) Djadjang Nurdjaman	(Indonesia) Legimin Raharjo	DJ Sport	Go-Jek, Corsa
PSPS Riau	(Indonesia) Philep Maramis	(Indonesia) Herman Dzumafo	Clasico	Pemuda Pancasila Indonesia, PTPN5, Bank Riau Kepri, Riaupulp, Pocari Sweat, Jesslyn, Riau Pos, Tribun Pekanbaru, HKTI
PSS	(Indonesia) Freddy Muli	(Indonesia) Busari	Sembada	Torabika, Go-Jek, Corsa, CS Shop, Muncul Group
Sragen United	(Indonesia) Kahudi Wahyu (caretaker)	(Indonesia) Ramadhan Saputra	DJ Sport	Go-Jek
Yahukimo	(Indonesia) Ungki Prasetyo	(Indonesia) Rayos Kobak		Bank Papua

=== Coaching changes ===
Team	Outgoing coach	Manner of departure	Date of vacancy	Position in table	Incoming coach	Date of appointment
Perssu	(Indonesia) Danur Dara	Resigned	27 April 2017	8th in Group 6	(Indonesia) Jamal Yastro	27 April 2017
Persibangga	(Indonesia) Lilik Suheri	Resigned	28 April 2017	8th in Group 3	(Indonesia) Achmad Muhariyah	2 May 2017
Cilegon United	(Indonesia) Arcan Iurie	Sacked	8 May 2017	7th in Group 2	(Indonesia) Imam Riyadi	9 May 2017
Pro Duta	(Indonesia) Ansyari Lubis	Resigned	9 May 2017	7th in Group 1	(Chile) Eladio Rojas	9 May 2017
Persibat	(Indonesia) Lukas Tumbuan	Resigned	21 May 2017	7th in Group 3	(Indonesia) Daniel Roekito	30 May 2017
Persebaya	(Indonesia) Iwan Setiawan	Sacked	22 May 2017	7th in Group 5	(Argentina) Alfredo Vera	27 May 2017
PSGC	(Brazil) Carlos de Mello	Mutual consent	30 May 2017	3rd in Group 3	(Indonesia) Lukas Tumbuan	14 June 2017
Persikabo	(Indonesia) Rudi Hariantoko	Resigned	3 June 2017	8th in Group 2	(Malaysia) Raja Isa	23 June 2017
PS Badung	(Indonesia) Syahrial Efendi	Sacked	4 July 2017	6th in Group 7	(Indonesia) Nyoman Sujata	4 July 2017
PSBL	(Indonesia) Amrustian	Resigned	15 July 2017	4th in Group 1	(Indonesia) Iwan Setiawan	22 July 2017
Persiba Bantul	(Indonesia) Purwanto Suwondo	Resigned	17 July 2017	8th in Group 4	(Indonesia) Sambudiana	17 July 2017
Persikad	(Indonesia) Isman Jasulmei	Sacked	19 July 2017	7th in Group 2	(Indonesia) Liestiadi	21 July 2017
Persih	(Indonesia) Raja Faisal	Resigned	22 July 2017	8th in Group 1	(Indonesia) Yusran Sikumbang	28 July 2017
Persepam	(Indonesia) Rudy Keltjes	Mutual consent	26 July 2017	7th in Group 5	(Indonesia) Suwandi HS	5 August 2017
Sragen United	(Indonesia) Jaya Hartono	Sacked	1 August 2017	5th in Group 4	(Indonesia) Kahudi Wahyu	1 August 2017
PSCS	(Indonesia) Gatot Barnowo	Resigned	4 August 2017	3rd in Group 3	(Indonesia) Jaya Hartono	5 August 2017
PSBL	(Indonesia) Iwan Setiawan	Signed by Borneo	14 August 2017	6th in Group 1		
PSMS	(Indonesia) Mahruzar Nasution	Sacked	20 September 2017	2nd in Group 1	(Indonesia) Djadjang Nurdjaman	20 September 2017
Celebest	(Indonesia) Rudy Priyambada	Signed by PS TNI	21 September 2017	3rd in Group 7	(Indonesia) Jafri Sastra	21 September 2017
Persipur	(Indonesia) Wahyu Teguh	Mutual consent	25 September 2017	4th in Group 4	(Indonesia) Yazid Sungkar	25 September 2017
Persik	(Indonesia) Bejo Sugiantoro	Mutual consent	3 October 2017	3rd in Group 6	(Indonesia) Riono Asnan	3 October 2017
Persepam	(Indonesia) Suwandi HS	Mutual consent	7 October 2017	4th in Group 5	(Indonesia) Suhaimi	7 October 2017
Persis	(Indonesia) Widyantoro	Banned by PSSI	16 October 2017	1st in Group A	(Indonesia) Freddy Muli	16 October 2017

== First round ==
The first round started on 19 April 2017 with 61 teams competing.

=== Group 1 ===
On 26 July 2017, Pro Duta announced to exit from the competition after 8 matches. The other teams' results against Pro Duta was nullified

Pos	Team	Pld	W	D	L	GF	GA	GD	Pts	Qualification or relegation	PSPS	PSMS	PSRJ	PSTB	KEPR	PSBL	PSIH	PRDT
1	PSPS Riau	12	7	4	1	21	8	+13	25	Advance to second round	—	0–0	1–0	1–3	0–0	1–0	6–0	—
2	PSMS	12	7	2	3	17	6	+11	23	Advance to second round	1–3	—	3–0	2–0	2–0	2–0	3–0 (Note: PSMS awarded a walkover win because Persih did not attend the match.)	—
3	Persiraja	12	6	4	2	20	9	+11	22	Qualification to relegation play-off	2–2	2–0	—	2–0	2–0 (Note: Match between Persiraja and 757 Kepri Jaya stopped in 80th minute due to riot of supporters and won't be continued. Persiraja was declared win 2-0.)	1–0	1–0	—
4	PS Timah Babel	12	6	1	5	17	17	0	19	Qualification to relegation play-off	0–2	1–0	1–1	—	1–0	2–0	3–1	—
5	757 Kepri Jaya (R)	12	5	3	4	19	12	+7	18	Relegation to Liga 3	1–2	0–0	1–1	3–0	—	4–2	2–0	—
6	PSBL (R)	12	3	2	7	15	16	−1	11	Relegation to Liga 3	0–0	0–2	1–1	3–0	2–3	—	4–0	—
7	Persih (Note: Persih were deducted six points for not attended the matches against PSBL and PSMS) (R)	12	0	0	12	4	45	−41	−6	Relegation to Liga 3	1–3	0–2	0–7	2–6	0–5	0–3 (Note: PSBL awarded a walkover win because Persih did not attend the match.)	—	—
8	Pro Duta (X, R)	0	0	0	0	0	0	0	0	Withdrawn	—	—	—	—	—	—	—	—

Source: Liga 2
Legend: Blue = home team win; Yellow = draw; Red = away team win.
Rules for classification: 1) Points; 2) Head-to-head; 3) Goal difference; 4) Goals scored.
(R) Relegated; (X) Withdrawn

=== Group 2 ===
Pos	Team	Pld	W	D	L	GF	GA	GD	Pts	Qualification or relegation	PSTA	CILG	PSRG	PSKA	PKAD	BGKL	LPST	KABO
1	Persita	14	9	3	2	18	7	+11	30	Advance to second round	—	1–1	2–0	2–0	1–0	1–0	4–1	2–1
2	Cilegon United	14	8	3	3	17	10	+7	27	Advance to second round	1–0	—	3–0	1–0	0–0	2–1	2–1	3–2
3	Perserang	14	8	0	6	21	18	+3	24	Qualification to relegation play-off	1–3	1–0	—	1–0	2–0	2–0	3–1	1–0
4	Persika	14	5	4	5	14	16	−2	19	Qualification to relegation play-off	0–0	2–1	2–1	—	2–1	0–2	1–0	3–1
5	Persikad (R)	14	5	3	6	14	15	−1	18	Relegation to Liga 3	2–0	0–0	3–5	2–2	—	1–0	0–1	2–0
6	PS Bengkulu (R)	14	5	2	7	12	13	−1	17	Relegation to Liga 3	0–1	0–1	1–0	0–0	1–0	—	2–0	1–1
7	Lampung Sakti (R)	14	5	1	8	15	17	−2	16	Relegation to Liga 3	0–1	0–1	2–1	1–1	0–1	3–0	—	2–0
8	Persikabo (R)	14	2	2	10	13	28	−15	8	Relegation to Liga 3	0–0	2–1	1–3	3–1	1–2	1–4	0–3	—

Source: Liga 2
Legend: Blue = home team win; Yellow = draw; Red = away team win.
Rules for classification: 1) Points; 2) Head-to-head; 3) Goal difference; 4) Goals scored.
(R) Relegated

=== Group 3 ===
Pos	Team	Pld	W	D	L	GF	GA	GD	Pts	Qualification or relegation	SLEM	PBAT	PSCS	PSGC	PBAS	PRSP	PJAP	PBGA
1	PSS	14	11	1	2	27	6	+21	34	Advance to second round	—	3–0	0–1	2–0	4–1	4–0	1–0	2–0
2	Persibat	14	7	3	4	15	7	+8	24 (Note: Persibat 4 Pts; PSCS 1 Pt.)	Advance to second round	0–0	—	1–0	2–0	2–0	0–1	1–0	2–0
3	PSCS	14	7	3	4	15	9	+6	24	Qualification to relegation play-off	2–0	0–0	—	1–0	0–1	1–0	3–0	4–3
4	PSGC	14	7	2	5	18	17	+1	23 (Note: PSGC 4 Pts; Persibas 1 Pt.)	Qualification to relegation play-off	2–3	1–0	2–1	—	1–0	1–0	4–0	2–1
5	Persibas (R)	14	7	2	5	19	17	+2	23	Relegation to Liga 3	0–3	2–1	1–1	1–1	—	3–1	1–2	2–0
6	Persip (R)	14	3	4	7	7	19	−12	13	Relegation to Liga 3	0–2	0–0	0–0	1–1	1–4	—	1–0	1–0
7	Persijap (R)	14	4	0	10	9	20	−11	12	Relegation to Liga 3	0–1	0–3 (Note: Match between Persijap and Persibat stopped in 90'+4' due to dissatisfaction to referee when Persijap was leading 2–1. Persijap declared lose 3–0.)	1–0	4–1	0–2	2–0	—	0–1
8	Persibangga (R)	14	2	1	11	8	23	−15	7	Relegation to Liga 3	0–2	0–3	0–1	1–2	0–1	1–1	1–0	—

Source: Liga 2
Legend: Blue = home team win; Yellow = draw; Red = away team win.
Rules for classification: 1) Points; 2) Head-to-head; 3) Goal difference; 4) Goals scored.
(R) Relegated

=== Group 4 ===
Pos	Team	Pld	W	D	L	GF	GA	GD	Pts	Qualification or relegation	PSIS	SOLO	PSIR	PPUR	SRAG	PPSM	PPON	PBTL
1	PSIS	14	11	2	1	26	7	+19	35	Advance to second round	—	1–0	1–1	1–0	2–1	1–0	1–0	5–0
2	Persis	14	8	5	1	21	8	+13	29	Advance to second round	1–0	—	1–1	4–0	2–1	3–1	1–1	1–0
3	PSIR	14	6	7	1	19	8	+11	25	Qualification to relegation play-off	1–1 (Note: Match between PSIR and Persis would be continued after Persis' appeal accepted by PSSI Disciplinary Committee. PSIR was leading 1-0.)	1–1	—	1–1	2–0	2–2	4–0	2–0
4	Persipur	14	5	3	6	15	15	0	18	Qualification to relegation play-off	1–2	0–1	1–0	—	0–0	2–0	3–1	3–0
5	Sragen United (R)	14	5	2	7	11	13	−2	17	Relegation to Liga 3	0–2	0–1	0–2	1–0	—	2–0	3–0	0–0
6	PPSM (R)	14	3	4	7	10	20	−10	13	Relegation to Liga 3	0–5	1–1	0–1	3–2	1–0	—	0–0	2–0
7	Persipon (R)	14	2	5	7	9	22	−13	11	Relegation to Liga 3	1–2	0–3	0–0	1–1	1–2	1–0 (Note: The match stopped in 83rd minute due to waterlogged pitch. After discussion, both teams decided not to continue the match because it just 7 minute left. Persipon declared win 1-0.)	—	1–0
8	Persiba Bantul (R)	14	0	4	10	4	22	−18	4	Relegation to Liga 3	1–2	1–1	0–1	0–1	0–1	0–0	2–2	—

Source: Liga 2
Legend: Blue = home team win; Yellow = draw; Red = away team win.
Rules for classification: 1) Points; 2) Head-to-head; 3) Goal difference; 4) Goals scored.
(R) Relegated

=== Group 5 ===
Pos	Team	Pld	W	D	L	GF	GA	GD	Pts	Qualification or relegation	PSBY	MTPR	PSIM	PPAM	PSTU	PNGA	MDPT	PSBI
1	Persebaya	14	8	5	1	27	11	+16	29	Advance to second round	—	2–0	2–1	3–1	2–0	4–0	1–1	4–0
2	Martapura	14	9	1	4	35	22	+13	28	Advance to second round	2–1	—	3–1	4–1	4–3	4–1	4–0	2–0
3	PSIM	14	6	3	5	21	18	+3	21	Qualification to relegation play-off	1–1	3–2	—	1–0	3–1	2–0	2–1	3–0
4	Persepam	14	5	3	6	25	23	+2	18 (Note: Tied on head-to-head results. Overall goal difference was used as the tiebreaker.)	Qualification to relegation play-off	2–2	4–2	1–1	—	2–1	5–2	0–0	4–1
5	Persatu (R)	14	5	3	6	21	20	+1	18	Relegation to Liga 3	0–0	1–1	1–0	2–1	—	3–0	4–2	3–1
6	Persinga (R)	14	4	4	6	16	24	−8	16	Relegation to Liga 3	1–1	3–1	2–0	2–0	1–1	—	2–0	1–1
7	Madiun Putra (R)	14	4	3	7	16	25	−9	15	Relegation to Liga 3	1–2	2–4	3–2	2–1	2–1	1–1	—	1–0
8	PSBI (R)	14	3	2	9	8	26	−18	11	Relegation to Liga 3	1–2	0–2	1–1	0–3	1–0	1–0	1–0	—

Source: Liga 2
Legend: Blue = home team win; Yellow = draw; Red = away team win.
Rules for classification: 1) Points; 2) Head-to-head; 3) Goal difference; 4) Goals scored.
(R) Relegated

=== Group 6 ===
Pos	Team	Pld	W	D	L	GF	GA	GD	Pts	Qualification or relegation	PSMP	KTPR	PSIK	PSBK	PSWG	PSSU	PSDA
1	PSMP	12	7	1	4	25	18	+7	22	Advance to second round	—	2–0	2–0	4–2	3–0	3–0	3–1
2	Kalteng Putra	12	6	3	3	23	13	+10	21	Advance to second round	4–1	—	1–1	6–1	1–0	4–0	4–1
3	Persik	12	6	2	4	18	15	+3	20	Qualification to relegation play-off	1–0	4–0	—	3–2	2–2	4–0	1–0
4	PSBK	12	5	3	4	25	25	0	18 (Note: PSBK 3 Pts, +1 GD; Persewangi 3 Pts, −1 GD.)	Qualification to relegation play-off	3–3	2–2	3–0	—	2–0	3–1	1–1
5	Persewangi (R)	12	5	3	4	17	16	+1	18	Relegation to Liga 3	3–1	0–1	1–0	2–1	—	1–0	3–0
6	Perssu (R)	12	3	2	7	14	25	−11	11	Relegation to Liga 3	1–2	1–0	3–0	2–3	4–4	—	1–0
7	Persida (R)	12	1	4	7	10	20	−10	7	Relegation to Liga 3	3–1	0–0	1–2	1–2	1–1	1–1	—

Source: Liga 2
Legend: Blue = home team win; Yellow = draw; Red = away team win.
Rules for classification: 1) Points; 2) Head-to-head; 3) Goal difference; 4) Goals scored.
(R) Relegated

=== Group 7 ===
Pos	Team	Pld	W	D	L	GF	GA	GD	Pts	Qualification or relegation	SMRU	MDRA	CLBS	PKAM	PSBD	PSSB	PKAP
1	Persigo Semeru	12	8	2	2	20	9	+11	26	Advance to second round	—	2–1	3–1	1–1	1–0	1–0	2–1
2	Madura	12	6	4	2	19	8	+11	22	Advance to second round	1–0	—	3–1	1–1	2–0	3–0	3–0
3	Celebest	12	5	4	3	12	7	+5	19	Qualification to relegation play-off	2–0	0–0	—	0–0	2–0	4–0	1–0
4	Persekam Metro	12	3	6	3	12	11	+1	15 (Note: Persekam Metro 3 Pts, +1 GD; PS Badung 3 Pts, −1 GD.)	Qualification to relegation play-off	0–3	0–0	0–0	—	2–0	3–0	3–3
5	PS Badung (R)	12	4	3	5	9	14	−5	15	Relegation to Liga 3	1–1	2–1	0–0	1–0	—	2–1	2–1
6	PS West Sumbawa (R)	12	3	1	8	7	24	−17	10	Relegation to Liga 3	1–5	1–1	1–0	0–1	2–0	—	1–0
7	Persekap (R)	12	2	2	8	13	19	−6	8	Relegation to Liga 3	0–1	1–3	0–1	2–1	1–1	4–0	—

Source: Liga 2
Legend: Blue = home team win; Yellow = draw; Red = away team win.
Rules for classification: 1) Points; 2) Head-to-head; 3) Goal difference; 4) Goals scored.
(R) Relegated

=== Group 8 ===
Unlike other groups who played their match on home and away basis, Group 8 was contested as a double round-robin tournament held at Gelora Delta Stadium, Sidoarjo. Persifa withdrew from the competition after the management did not submit the player list and could not be contacted in a day before their first match.

Pos	Team	Pld	W	D	L	GF	GA	GD	Pts	Qualification or relegation	PSWA	PSBS	PKMA	YHKM	PGBN	PBUL	PSFA
1	Persiwa	10	6	2	2	14	8	+6	20	Advance to second round	—	1–0	0–2	2–0	1–1	3–1	—
2	PSBS	10	5	3	2	17	9	+8	18	Advance to second round	0–1	—	2–1	1–1	3–2	6–1	—
3	Perseka Manokwari	10	4	3	3	10	6	+4	15 (Note: Perseka Manokwari 3 Pts, +1 GD; Yahukimo 3 Pts, −1 GD.)	Qualification to relegation play-off	0–0	1–1	—	0–1	0–0	1–0	—
4	Yahukimo	10	4	3	3	10	10	0	15	Qualification to relegation play-off	2–1	0–1	0–2	—	2–2	1–0	—
5	Persigubin (R)	10	3	5	2	14	8	+6	14	Relegation to Liga 3	1–2	0–0	2–0	0–0	—	4–0	—
6	Persbul (R)	10	0	0	10	5	29	−24	0	Relegation to Liga 3	1–3	1–3	0–3	1–3	0–2	—	—
7	Persifa (X, R)	0	0	0	0	0	0	0	0	Withdrawn	—	—	—	—	—	—	—

Source: Liga 2
Legend: Blue = home team win; Yellow = draw; Red = away team win.
Rules for classification: 1) Points; 2) Head-to-head; 3) Goal difference; 4) Goals scored.
(R) Relegated; (X) Withdrawn

== Second round ==
This round began on 20 September 2017 and ended on 13 October 2017. Sixteen teams competed in this round.

=== Group A ===
Pos	Team	Pld	W	D	L	GF	GA	GD	Pts	Qualification	SOLO	PSPS	SLEM	CILG
1	Persis	6	3	1	2	6	5	+1	10	Advance to third round	—	1–0	1–0	2–0
2	PSPS Riau	6	2	2	2	9	6	+3	8 (Note: PSPS Riau 4 Pts; PSS 1 Pt.)	Advance to third round	1–1	—	1–1	4–0
3	PSS	6	2	2	2	9	9	0	8		2–1	2–3	—	2–1
4	Cilegon United	6	2	1	3	6	10	−4	7		2–0	1–0	2–2	—

Source: Liga 2
Legend: Blue = home team win; Yellow = draw; Red = away team win.
Rules for classification: 1) Points; 2) Head-to-head; 3) Goal difference; 4) Goals scored.

=== Group B ===
Pos	Team	Pld	W	D	L	GF	GA	GD	Pts	Qualification	PSIS	PSMS	PBAT	PSTA
1	PSIS	6	4	1	1	12	5	+7	13	Advance to third round	—	2–1	3–0	2–0
2	PSMS	6	3	1	2	7	5	+2	10	Advance to third round	3–1	—	2–1	0–0
3	Persibat	6	2	1	3	6	9	−3	7		1–1	1–0	—	1–2
4	Persita	6	1	1	4	3	9	−6	4		0–3	0–1	1–2	—

Source: Liga 2
Legend: Blue = home team win; Yellow = draw; Red = away team win.
Rules for classification: 1) Points; 2) Head-to-head; 3) Goal difference; 4) Goals scored.

=== Group C ===
Pos	Team	Pld	W	D	L	GF	GA	GD	Pts	Qualification	KTPR	PSBY	SMRU	PSBS
1	Kalteng Putra	6	3	2	1	10	4	+6	11	Advance to third round	—	1–1	1–1	4–1
2	Persebaya	6	2	3	1	10	2	+8	9 (Note: Persebaya 4 Pts; Persigo Semeru 1 Pt.)	Advance to third round	0–1	—	4–0	5–0
3	Persigo Semeru	6	2	3	1	3	5	−2	9		1–0	0–0	—	1–0
4	PSBS	6	0	2	4	1	13	−12	2		0–3	0–0	0–0	—

Source: Liga 2
Legend: Blue = home team win; Yellow = draw; Red = away team win.
Rules for classification: 1) Points; 2) Head-to-head; 3) Goal difference; 4) Goals scored.

=== Group D ===
Pos	Team	Pld	W	D	L	GF	GA	GD	Pts	Qualification	PSMP	MTPR	MDRA	PSWA
1	PSMP	6	4	0	2	9	7	+2	12	Advance to third round	—	2–1	3–1	1–0
2	Martapura	6	3	2	1	14	7	+7	11	Advance to third round	3–2	—	3–2	6–0
3	Madura	6	3	1	2	10	8	+2	10		2–0	1–1	—	2–1
4	Persiwa	6	0	1	5	1	12	−11	1		0–1	0–0	0–2	—

Source: Liga 2
Legend: Blue = home team win; Yellow = draw; Red = away team win.
Rules for classification: 1) Points; 2) Head-to-head; 3) Goal difference; 4) Goals scored.

== Third round ==
The third round was divided into 2 groups. Each group was contested as a single round-robin tournament played with the home tournament format on a neutral venue. The group winners and runners-up qualified to semifinals.

=== Group X ===
- Five matches were held in Patriot Chandrabhaga Stadium, Bekasi and one match was held in Singaperbangsa Stadium, Karawang
- Times listed are UTC+7:00

Pos	Team	Pld	W	D	L	GF	GA	GD	Pts	Qualification
1	PSMS (P)	3	2	0	1	4	3	+1	6 (Note: Martapura 1–2 PSMS)	Advance to semifinals
2	Martapura	3	2	0	1	4	3	+1	6	Advance to semifinals
3	Kalteng Putra	3	1	0	2	3	4	−1	3 (Note: Kalteng Putra 1–0 Persis)	
4	Persis	3	1	0	2	1	2	−1	3	

Source: Liga 2
(P) Promoted
Notes:
9 November 2017
15:30

Persis	0–1	Martapura
	Report	Qischil 66'

Patriot Chandrabhaga Stadium, Bekasi
9 November 2017
18:30

PSMS	2–1	Kalteng Putra
Wirahadi 16', 74'	Report	Runtukahu 84'

Patriot Chandrabhaga Stadium, Bekasi

13 November 2017
15:30

Martapura	1–2	PSMS
Ady 86' (pen.)	Report	Choiril 23'; Frets 84'

Patriot Chandrabhaga Stadium, Bekasi
13 November 2017
19:00

Kalteng Putra	1–0	Persis
Rais 26'	Report	Rudiyana (red card) 90+3'

Patriot Chandrabhaga Stadium, Bekasi

16 November 2017
15:00

Persis	1–0	PSMS
Tri 12'	Report

Patriot Chandrabhaga Stadium, Bekasi
16 November 2017
15:00

Kalteng Putra	1–2	Martapura
Rais 36'; Yericho (red card) 88'	Report	Wahyu 9'; Ahya 64' (o.g.)

Singaperbangsa Stadium, Karawang

=== Group Y ===
- All matches were held in Gelora Bandung Lautan Api Stadium, Bandung
- Initially this group matches were held in Wibawa Mukti Stadium, Cikarang but Bekasi Regent cancelled it after 2017 Liga 1 U-19 final riot
- Times listed are UTC+7:00

Pos	Team	Pld	W	D	L	GF	GA	GD	Pts	Qualification
1	Persebaya (C, P)	3	3	0	0	6	0	+6	9	Advance to semifinals
2	PSIS (P)	3	1	1	1	4	2	+2	4 (Note: Tied on head-to-head result (PSIS 1–1 PSPS Riau). Overall goal difference was used as the tiebreaker.)	Advance to semifinals
3	PSPS Riau	3	1	1	1	4	3	+1	4	
4	PSMP	3	0	0	3	1	10	−9	0	

Source: Liga 2
(C) Champions; (P) Promoted
Notes:
15 November 2017
15:00

PSIS	0–1	Persebaya
	Report	Irfan 19'

Gelora Bandung Lautan Api Stadium, Bandung
15 November 2017
18:30

PSPS Riau	3–1	PSMP
Dzumafo 25', 35', 79'	Report	Kambuaya 58'

Gelora Bandung Lautan Api Stadium, Bandung

18 November 2017
15:00

Persebaya	1–0	PSPS Riau
Rishadi 87'	Report

Gelora Bandung Lautan Api Stadium, Bandung
18 November 2017
18:30

PSMP	0–3	PSIS
	Report	Rio 24'; Aldaier 43'; Hari Nur 74'

Gelora Bandung Lautan Api Stadium, Bandung

21 November 2017
15:00

PSMP	0–4	Persebaya
	Report	Rendi 42'; Oktafianus 56', 81'; Yogi 90'

Gelora Bandung Lautan Api Stadium, Bandung
21 November 2017
18:30

PSIS	1–1	PSPS Riau
Haudi 71'	Report	Wahyu 43'

Gelora Bandung Lautan Api Stadium, Bandung

== Knockout round ==
Knockout round was held in Gelora Bandung Lautan Api Stadium, Bandung on 25–28 November 2017. The three best teams promoted to Liga 1.

Semi-finals
25 November – Bandung
PSMS (a.e.t.)	2
PSIS	0
25 November – Bandung
Persebaya	3
Martapura	1

Final
28 November – Bandung
PSMS	2
Persebaya (a.e.t.)	3
Third place
28 November – Bandung
PSIS (a.e.t.)	6
Martapura	4

=== Semifinals ===
25 November 2017
15:00 UTC+7:00

Persebaya	3–1	Martapura
Irfan 25' (pen.), 38'; Rishadi 58'	Report	Reza 56'

Gelora Bandung Lautan Api Stadium, Bandung
Referee: Dodi Setia Purnama
25 November 2017
20:00 UTC+7:00

PSMS	2–0 (a.e.t.)	PSIS
Frets 114'; Dimas 118'	Report

Gelora Bandung Lautan Api Stadium, Bandung
Referee: Nusur Fadilah

=== Third place ===
28 November 2017
15:00 UTC+7:00

PSIS	6–4 (a.e.t.)	Martapura
Hari Nur 6', 60', 86'; Aldaier 43'; Andrid 97', 110'	Report	Nahumarury 9', 37'; Reza 47'; Bogel 80'

Gelora Bandung Lautan Api Stadium, Bandung
Referee: Aprisman Aranda

=== Final ===
28 November 2017
19:00 UTC+7:00

PSMS	2–3 (a.e.t.)	Persebaya
Wirahadi 9' (pen.); Roni 38'	Report	Rishadi 2'; Irfan 41', 92'

Gelora Bandung Lautan Api Stadium, Bandung
Attendance: 13,895
Referee: Hadiyani (Bekasi)

== Relegation play-off ==
A special play-off was held between PSBK and Persewangi to determine one slot left for relegation play-off.

10 October 2017
15:00 UTC+7:00

PSBK	1–0	Persewangi
Prisma 69'	Report

Kanjuruhan Stadium, Malang
Attendance: 0
Referee: Suhardiyanto

This match stopped in 86' due to dissatisfaction to referee when PSBK was leading 1–0. Persewangi declared lose 0–3.

Relegation play-off round was divided into 4 groups. Each group was contested as a single round-robin tournament played with the home tournament format on a neutral venue. The group winner and one best runner-up teams were stayed in 2018 Liga 2. The drawing was held in Jakarta on 18 September 2017.

=== Group E ===
- Five matches were held in Manahan Stadium, Solo and one match were held in Sriwedari Stadium, Solo
- Times listed are UTC+7:00

Pos	Team	Pld	W	D	L	GF	GA	GD	Pts	Relegation
1	Persiraja	3	2	1	0	5	2	+3	7	
2	Persika	3	2	0	1	7	4	+3	6	
3	Persepam (R)	3	1	1	1	4	6	−2	4	Relegation to Liga 3
4	Celebest (R)	3	0	0	3	2	6	−4	0	Relegation to Liga 3

Source: Liga 2
Rules for classification: 1) Points; 2) Head-to-head; 3) Goal difference; 4) Goals scored.
(R) Relegated
10 October 2017
15:30

Persiraja	1–1	Persepam
Aulia 23'	Report	Syaifullah 15'

Manahan Stadium, Solo
Referee: Novriandy
10 October 2017
19:00

Celebest	1–2	Persika
Firmansyah 11'	Report	Redian 56'; Syahrizal 90+5' (o.g.)

Manahan Stadium, Solo
Referee: Sunarto

13 October 2017
15:30

Persepam	2–0	Celebest
Aditya 38'; M. Kasim 83'	Report

Manahan Stadium, Solo
13 October 2017
19:00

Persika	0–2	Persiraja
	Report	Vivi 4'; Fahrizal 66'

Manahan Stadium, Solo
Referee: Armyn Dwi Suryathin

16 October 2017
15:00

Persiraja	2–1	Celebest
Fahrizal 6', 53'	Report	Martinus 62'

Manahan Stadium, Solo
16 October 2017
15:00

Persika	5–1	Persepam
Redian 27', 37'; Ade Ivan 64', 71'; Husnuzon 77'	Report	Faris 11'

Sriwedari Stadium, Solo

=== Group F ===
- Five matches were held in Gelora Delta Stadium, Sidoarjo and one match was held in Bumimoro Stadium, Surabaya
- Times listed are UTC+7:00

Pos	Team	Pld	W	D	L	GF	GA	GD	Pts	Relegation
1	PSIR	3	2	1	0	2	0	+2	7	
2	Yahukimo (R)	3	1	2	0	5	0	+5	5	Relegation to Liga 3
3	Persik (R)	3	1	1	1	2	1	+1	4	Relegation to Liga 3
4	PS Timah Babel (R)	3	0	0	3	0	8	−8	0	Relegation to Liga 3

Source: Liga 2
Rules for classification: 1) Points; 2) Head-to-head; 3) Goal difference; 4) Goals scored.
(R) Relegated
11 October 2017
15:00

PSIR	1–0	PS Timah Babel
Yoni 87' (pen.)	Report

Gelora Delta Stadium, Sidoarjo
11 October 2017
18:15

Persik	0–0	Yahukimo
	Report

Gelora Delta Stadium, Sidoarjo

14 October 2017
15:00

PS Timah Babel	0–2	Persik
	Report	Arif 29' (pen.); Larso 73'

Gelora Delta Stadium, Sidoarjo
14 October 2017
18:15

Yahukimo	0–0	PSIR
	Report

Gelora Delta Stadium, Sidoarjo

17 October 2017
15:00

PSIR	1–0	Persik
Choirunasichin 89'	Report

Gelora Delta Stadium, Sidoarjo
17 October 2017
15:00

Yahukimo	5–0	PS Timah Babel
	Report

Bumimoro Stadium, Surabaya

=== Group G ===
- Five matches were held in Wilis Stadium, Madiun and one match was held in Ketonggo Stadium, Ngawi
- Times listed are UTC+7:00

Pos	Team	Pld	W	D	L	GF	GA	GD	Pts	Relegation
1	Perserang	3	2	0	1	3	3	0	6 (Note: PSGC 1–2 Perserang)	
2	PSGC (R)	3	2	0	1	4	3	+1	6	Relegation to Liga 3
3	Persekam Metro (R)	3	1	1	1	3	2	+1	4	Relegation to Liga 3
4	Perseka Manokwari (R)	3	0	1	2	0	2	−2	1	Relegation to Liga 3

Source: Liga 2
Rules for classification: 1) Points; 2) Head-to-head; 3) Goal difference; 4) Goals scored.
(R) Relegated
Notes:
11 October 2017
15:00

Perserang	0–2	Persekam Metro
	Report	Yogi 43'; Nur Akbar 66'

Wilis Stadium, Madiun
11 October 2017
18:30

Perseka Manokwari	0–1	PSGC
	Report	Ganjar 26'

Wilis Stadium, Madiun

14 October 2017
15:30

PSGC	1–2	Perserang
Ganjar 54'	Report	Frendy 51'; Rastiawan 75'

Wilis Stadium, Madiun
14 October 2017
19:00

Persekam Metro	0–0	Perseka Manokwari
	Report

Wilis Stadium, Madiun

17 October 2017
15:00

Perseka Manokwari	0–1	Perserang
	Report	Rexi 75'

Wilis Stadium, Madiun
17 October 2017
15:00

Persekam Metro	1–2	PSGC
Kushedya 76'	Report	Ryan 17', 62'

Ketonggo Stadium, Ngawi

=== Group H ===
- Five matches were held in Kanjuruhan Stadium, Malang and one match was held in Gajayana Stadium, Malang
- Times listed are UTC+7:00

Pos	Team	Pld	W	D	L	GF	GA	GD	Pts	Relegation
1	PSIM	3	2	0	1	5	2	+3	6	
2	PSCS (R)	3	1	2	0	5	4	+1	5	Relegation to Liga 3
3	PSBK (R)	3	1	1	1	3	4	−1	4	Relegation to Liga 3
4	Persipur (R)	3	0	1	2	4	7	−3	1	Relegation to Liga 3

Source: Liga 2
Rules for classification: 1) Points; 2) Head-to-head; 3) Goal difference; 4) Goals scored.
(R) Relegated
12 October 2017
15:00

PSIM	2–1	Persipur
Hendika 14'; Krisna 23'	Report	Sauyai 33'

Kanjuruhan Stadium, Malang
12 October 2017
18:30

PSCS	1–1	PSBK
Imam 52'	Report	Angga 19'

Kanjuruhan Stadium, Malang

15 October 2017
15:00

Persipur	3–3	PSCS
Santoso 21'; Wahyu 62'; Ilham 90+1'	Report	Imam 12', 39'; Galih 17'

Kanjuruhan Stadium, Malang
15 October 2017
19:00

PSBK	0–3	PSIM
	Report	Dicky 13'; Krisna 39'; Engkus 80'

Kanjuruhan Stadium, Malang

18 October 2017
15:00

PSIM	0–1	PSCS
	Report	Alberta 22'

Kanjuruhan Stadium, Malang
18 October 2017
15:00

PSBK	2–0	Persipur
Angga 69'; Harahap 88'	Report

Gajayana Stadium, Malang

=== Ranking of second-placed teams ===
Pos	Grp	Team	Pld	W	D	L	GF	GA	GD	Pts	Relegation
1	E	Persika	3	2	0	1	7	4	+3	6	
2	G	PSGC (R)	3	2	0	1	4	3	+1	6	Relegation to Liga 3
3	F	Yahukimo (R)	3	1	2	0	5	0	+5	5	Relegation to Liga 3
4	H	PSCS (R)	3	1	2	0	5	4	+1	5	Relegation to Liga 3

Source: Liga 2
Rules for classification: 1) Points; 2) Goal difference; 3) Goals scored.
(R) Relegated

== Season statistics ==
=== Top scorers ===
Rank	Player	Club	Goals
1	(Indonesia) Rivaldi Bawuo	Kalteng Putra	17
2	(Indonesia) Mahadirga Lasut	PSS	13
3	(Indonesia) Qischil Minny	Martapura	12
3	(Indonesia) Misbakus Solikin	Persebaya	12
5	(Indonesia) Indra Setiawan	PSMP	11
5	(Indonesia) Haris Tuharea	Perssu (8), PSMP (3)	11
5	(Indonesia) Herman Dzumafo	PSPS Riau	11
8	(Indonesia) Irfan Jaya	Persebaya	10

== See also ==
- 2017 Liga 1
- 2017 Liga 3
