= List of Indonesian football transfers 2017 =

This is a list of Indonesia football transfers for the 2017 season transfer window. Liga 1

== Liga 1 ==
=== Arema ===
In:

No.	Pos.	Nation	Player
3	DF	LBN	Jad Noureddine (from (Indonesia) Pusamania Borneo)
5	DF	IDN	Bagas Adi Nugroho (from (Indonesia) PSS Sleman)
8	MF	IDN	Nasir (from (Indonesia) Persatu Tuban)
18	MF	IDN	Adam Alis (from (Indonesia) Barito Putera)
19	MF	IDN	Ahmad Bustomi (loan return from (Indonesia) Madura United)
20	FW	COL	Juan Pablo Pino (from free agent)
21	GK	IDN	Ahmad Ibnu Adam (from (Indonesia) Arema U21)
23	MF	IDN	Hanif Sjahbandi (from (Indonesia) Persiba Balikpapan)
27	FW	IDN	Dedik Setiawan (from (Indonesia) Arema U21)
33	GK	IDN	Dwi Kuswanto (from (Indonesia) Persela Lamongan)
44	DF	BRA	Arthur Cunha (from (Indonesia) Mitra Kukar)
98	FW	IDN	Muhammad Rafli (from (Indonesia) Arema U21)

Out:

No.	Pos.	Nation	Player
5	DF	IDN	Ryuji Utomo (to (Indonesia) Persija Jakarta)
8	MF	IDN	Raphael Maitimo (to (Indonesia) Persib Bandung)
16	DF	MKD	Goran Gančev ( (Indonesia) Persegres Gresik United)
20	MF	BRA	Marcio Teruel (Released)
21	GK	IDN	I Made Wardana (to (Indonesia) Bali United)
23	DF	IDN	Hamka Hamzah (to (Indonesia) PSM Makassar)
32	MF	AUS	Nick Kalmar (to (Australia) Dandenong City SC)
47	GK	IDN	Achmad Kurniawan (Passed Away)
77	MF	IDN	Juan Revi (to (Indonesia) Persela Lamongan)
99	FW	IDN	Ahmad Nufiandani (to (Indonesia) PS TNI)

=== Bali United ===
In:

No.	Pos.	Nation	Player
8	MF	IDN	Muhammad Taufiq (from (Indonesia) Persib Bandung)
10	FW	IDN	Irfan Bachdim (from (Japan) Consadole Sapporo)
15	FW	IDN	Yandi Munawar (from (Indonesia) Persib Bandung)
21	GK	IDN	I Made Wardana (from (Indonesia) Arema)
22	DF	IDN	Dias Angga (from (Indonesia) Persib Bandung)
23	MF	NED	Nick van der Velden (from (Scotland) Dundee United)
26	DF	IDN	Ngurah Nanak (from (Indonesia) Sriwijaya)
33	DF	IDN	I Made Andhika (from (Indonesia) Bali United Youth)
37	FW	IDN	Samsul Pellu (from (Indonesia) Bali United Youth)
45	FW	IDN	Azka Fauzi (from (Indonesia) Bali United Youth)
48	MF	ARG	Marcos Flores (from (Indonesia) Persib Bandung)
77	GK	IDN	Alfonsius Kelvan (from (Indonesia) Persiba Balikpapan)
78	FW	IDN	Jackson Tiwu (from (Indonesia) PSN Ngada)
81	GK	IDN	Wawan Hendrawan (from (Indonesia) Pusamania Borneo)
99	FW	NED	Sylvano Comvalius (from (Ukraine) Stal Kamianske)

Out:

No.	Pos.	Nation	Player
1	MF	IDN	Rully Desrian (to (Indonesia) Bhayangkara)
5	DF	IDN	Indra Permana (to (Indonesia) Sriwijaya)
9	DF	IDN	Alsan Sanda (to (Indonesia) Bhayangkara)
10	MF	IDN	Loudry Setiawan (to (Indonesia) Gresik United)
13	DF	IDN	Bobby Satria (to (Indonesia) Sriwijaya)
15	FW	IDN	Yulius Mauloko (to (Timor-Leste) Carsae)
19	MF	IDN	Hendra Sandi (to (Indonesia) Sriwijaya)
30	FW	ENG	Daniel Heffernan (Released)
86	MF	SRB	Zoran Knežević (Released)
99	FW	SRB	Nemanja Vidaković (to (Serbia) Napredak Kruševac)

=== Barito Putera ===
In:

No.	Pos.	Nation	Player
2	DF	AUS	Aaron Evans (from (Laos) Lanexang United)
11	FW	BRA	Thiago Cunha (from (Brazil) Londrina)
12	GK	IDN	Shahar Ginanjar (from (Indonesia) Mitra Kukar)
15	MF	IDN	Syahroni (from (Indonesia) Persija Jakarta)
18	MF	IDN	Gavin Kwan (from (Indonesia) Pusamania Borneo)
21	DF	IDN	Valentino Telaubun (from (Indonesia) Bhayangkara)
24	MF	IDN	Fajar Handika (from (Indonesia) Madura United)
77	MF	ARG	Matías Córdoba (from (Malaysia) Penang FA)
80	MF	BRA	Douglas Packer (from (Italy) F.C. Südtirol)
91	MF	IDN	David Laly (from (Indonesia) Persib Bandung)
97	MF	IDN	Daniel Tata (from (Indonesia) Persipura Jayapura)

Out:

No.	Pos.	Nation	Player
4	MF	KOR	Lim Joon-sik (Released)
6	DF	CMR	Thierry Gathuessi (Released)
10	FW	BRA	Luiz Júnior (to (Indonesia) Madura United)
13	MF	IDN	Lucky Wahyu (to (Indonesia) 757 Kepri Jaya)
14	DF	IDN	Fathlul Rahman (to (Indonesia) PSM Makassar)
18	MF	IDN	Adam Alis (to (Indonesia) Arema)
92	MF	BRA	Thiago Amaral (Released)

=== Bhayangkara ===
In:

No.	Pos.	Nation	Player
4	DF	IDN	Ikhfanul Alam (from (Indonesia) Perserang Serang)
9	FW	IDN	Muchlis Hadi (from (Indonesia) PSM Makassar)
10	FW	IDN	Jajang Mulyana (from (Indonesia) Martapura)
11	MF	IDN	Dinan Javier (from (Indonesia) Mitra Kukar)
12	GK	IDN	Awan Setho Raharjo (from (Indonesia) Persip Pekalongan)
15	MF	IDN	Firman Utina (from (Indonesia) Sriwijaya)
17	DF	IDN	Alsan Sanda (from (Indonesia) Bali United)
22	FW	IDN	Dendy Sulistyawan (from (Indonesia) Persela Lamongan)
26	DF	IDN	Alfin Tuasalamony (from free agent)
39	FW	IDN	Guy Junior (from (Indonesia) Madura United)
46	DF	IDN	Suroso (back from Retirement)
72	GK	IDN	Rully Desrian (from (Indonesia) Bali United)
80	FW	POR	Paulo Sérgio (from free agent)

Out:

No.	Pos.	Nation	Player
4	DF	IDN	Suroso (Retired)
8	MF	IDN	Indra Setiawan (to (Indonesia) Mojokerto Putra)
10	FW	IDN	Rudi Widodo (to (Indonesia) Persija Jakarta)
12	GK	IDN	Awan Setho Raharjo (loan to (Indonesia) PSIS Semarang)
17	MF	IDN	Fitra Ridwan (to (Indonesia) Persegres Gresik United)
22	FW	IDN	Fandi Eko Utomo (to (Indonesia) Madura United)
30	GK	IDN	Thomas Ryan Bayu (to (Indonesia) Mitra Kukar)
31	FW	IDN	Bijahil Chalwa (to (Indonesia) Persebaya Surabaya)
53	DF	IDN	Herwin Tri Saputra (to (Indonesia) Persegres Gresik United)
68	MF	IDN	Eljo Iba (Released)
70	FW	IDN	Rafid Lestaluhu (to (Indonesia) PS Badung)
77	GK	IDN	Fafa Tarista (Released)
81	MF	IDN	Muhammad Hargianto (loan to (Indonesia) Persija Jakarta)
82	DF	IDN	Valentino Telaubun (to (Indonesia) Barito Putera)
86	MF	MAR	Khairullah Abdelkhabir (Released)

=== Madura United ===
In:

No.	Pos.	Nation	Player
3	DF	IDN	Eriyanto (from (Indonesia) PSIR Rembang)
6	DF	IDN	Rendika Rama (from (Indonesia) Persija Jakarta)
9	FW	IDN	Greg Nwokolo (from (Indonesia) Persija Jakarta)
12	MF	IDN	Rifad Marasabessy (from (Indonesia) PS TNI U21)
16	MF	IDN	Rizky Dwi Febriyanto (from (Indonesia) Persepam Pamekasan)
18	MF	MAR	Redouane Zerzouri (from (Morocco) ASFAR)
19	MF	IDN	Tanjung Sugiarto (from (Indonesia) Persija Jakarta U21)
21	MF	IDN	Fredy Isir (from (Indonesia) Persipura U21)
22	MF	IDN	Fandi Eko Utomo (from (Indonesia) Bhayangkara)
24	FW	NGR	Peter Odemwingie (from free agent)
25	GK	IDN	Panggih Sembodho (from (Indonesia) Bhayangkara U21)
26	DF	IDN	Fachrudin Aryanto (from (Indonesia) Sriwijaya)
27	FW	CIV	Boubacar Sanogo (from free agent)
33	GK	IDN	Muhammad Reza Pratama (from (Timor-Leste) Atlético Ultramar)
90	FW	BRA	Luiz Júnior (from (Indonesia) Barito Putera)
99	MF	IDN	Saldi (from (Indonesia) Pusamania Borneo U21)

Out:

No.	Pos.	Nation	Player
9	FW	ESP	Pablo Rodríguez (to (Singapore) Hougang United)
11	MF	IDN	Rossy Noprihanis (to (Indonesia) PSS Sleman)
18	DF	IDN	Ahmad Maulana Putra (to (Indonesia) Sriwijaya)
18	MF	MAR	Redouane Zerzouri (Released)
19	MF	IDN	Ahmad Bustomi (return to (Indonesia) Arema F.C.)
25	FW	IDN	Rishadi Fauzi (to (Indonesia) Persebaya Surabaya)
26	DF	IDN	Firdaus Ramadhan (to (Indonesia) Sriwijaya)
27	FW	IDN	Patrich Wanggai (to (Indonesia) Pusamania Borneo)
30	DF	IDN	Jeki Arisandi (to (Indonesia) Persegres Gresik United)
47	FW	IDN	Guy Junior (to (Indonesia) Bhayangkara)
50	MF	LBR	Erick Weeks Lewis (Released)
51	MF	IDN	Haniful Karim (to (Indonesia) Persepam Pamekasan)
52	GK	IDN	Adi Sendi Pratama (to (Indonesia) Persepam Pamekasan)
53	FW	IDN	Ervan Efendi (Released)
54	GK	IDN	Joko Ribowo (loan to (Indonesia) Mitra Kukar)
90	FW	BRA	Luiz Júnior (loan to (Indonesia) Persija Jakarta)

=== Mitra Kukar ===
In:

No.	Pos.	Nation	Player
3	DF	IDN	Wiganda Pradika (from (Indonesia) PS TNI)
4	DF	IDN	Syaiful Ramadhan (from (Indonesia) PS TNI)
5	DF	ESP	Jorge Gotor (from (Spain) Eldense)
7	FW	IDN	Zulham Zamrun (from (Indonesia) Persib Bandung)
9	FW	BRA	Marclei Santos (from (Brazil) Bahia de Feira)
10	MF	KOR	Oh In-kyun (from (Indonesia) Persegres Gresik United)
11	MF	IDN	Arpani (from (Indonesia) Pusamania Borneo)
18	DF	IDN	Noval Fandiannur (from (Indonesia) Mitra Kukar U-21)
19	FW	IDN	Aldino Herdianto (from (Indonesia) PS TNI)
22	MF	IDN	Abdul Rohim Tole (from (Indonesia) Mitra Kukar U-21)
30	GK	IDN	Thomas Ryan Bayu (from (Indonesia) Bhayangkara)
33	DF	IDN	Muhammad Rizky Ramadhan (from (Indonesia) Mitra Kukar U-21)
49	FW	IDN	Monieaga Suwardi (from (Indonesia) PSS Sleman)
54	GK	IDN	Joko Ribowo (on loan from (Indonesia) Madura United)
66	MF	IDN	Dhika Pratama (from (Indonesia) Mitra Kukar U-21)
69	FW	IDN	Andre Agustiar (from (Indonesia) Persik Kediri)
85	MF	MLI	Mohamed Sissoko (from free agent)
88	DF	IDN	Seftia Hadi (from (Indonesia) Persatu Tuban)

Out:

No.	Pos.	Nation	Player
4	DF	BRA	Arthur Cunha (to (Indonesia) Arema)
7	MF	IDN	Arifki Eka Putra (to (Indonesia) Celebest)
8	MF	IDN	Dian Irawan (Released)
9	FW	BRA	Marlon da Silva (to (Indonesia) Persiba Balikpapan)
11	FW	IDN	Dinan Javier (to (Indonesia) Bhayangkara)
12	GK	IDN	Shahar Ginanjar (to (Indonesia) Barito Putera)
17	FW	IDN	Ronal Semot (to (Indonesia) Kalteng Putra)
24	DF	IDN	Michael Orah (to (Indonesia) Pusamania Borneo)
30	GK	IDN	Thomas Ryan Bayu (Released)
33	DF	IDN	Syahrizal Syahbuddin (to (Indonesia) Persiraja Banda Aceh)
66	MF	IDN	Asri Akbar (to (Indonesia) Pusamania Borneo)
85	MF	ESP	Pulga (Released)

=== Persib Bandung ===
In:

No.	Pos.	Nation	Player
2	DF	IDN	Wildansyah (from (Indonesia) Sriwijaya)
5	MF	GHA	Michael Essien (from free agent)
10	MF	IDN	Raphael Maitimo (from (Indonesia) Arema)
11	MF	IDN	Dedi Kusnandar (from (Malaysia) Sabah FA)
12	FW	ENG	Carlton Cole (from free agent)
16	DF	IDN	Achmad Jufriyanto (from (Indonesia) Sriwijaya)
17	MF	JPN	Shohei Matsunaga (from (Indonesia) Persiba Balikpapan)
20	MF	IDN	Billy Keraf (from (Indonesia) SSB Asiop)
22	DF	IDN	Supardi (from (Indonesia) Sriwijaya)
25	GK	IDN	Imam Arief Fadillah (from (Indonesia) Barito Putera)

Out:

No.	Pos.	Nation	Player
2	DF	IDN	Purwaka Yudhi (Released)
4	DF	IDN	Dias Angga (to (Indonesia) Bali United)
5	DF	AUS	Diogo Ferreira (to (Malaysia) Penang FA)
8	MF	IDN	Muhammad Taufiq (to (Indonesia) Bali United)
9	FW	IDN	Samsul Arif (to (Indonesia) Persela Lamongan)
10	MF	ARG	Robertino Pugliara (to (Indonesia) Persipura Jayapura)
11	FW	IDN	Rudiyana (to (Indonesia) PSS Sleman)
13	DF	IDN	Agung Pribadi (loan to (Indonesia) Persela Lamongan)
15	FW	IDN	Yandi Sofyan (to (Indonesia) Bali United)
17	MF	IDN	Rachmad Hidayat (to (Indonesia) Sriwijaya)
21	GK	IDN	Muhammad Ridwan (to (Indonesia) Semen Padang)
31	DF	IDN	Yanto Basna (to (Indonesia) Sriwijaya)
48	DF	ARG	Marcos Flores (to (Indonesia) Bali United)
54	MF	IDN	Zulham Zamrun (to (Indonesia) Mitra Kukar)
91	FW	IDN	David Laly (to (Indonesia) Barito Putera)

=== Persiba Balikpapan ===
In:

No.	Pos.	Nation	Player
4	DF	IDN	Ardhi Yuniar (from (Indonesia) Persela Lamongan U21)
6	DF	IDN	Alfath Fathier (from Persib Bandung U21)
9	FW	BRA	Marlon Silva (from (Indonesia) Mitra Kukar)
10	FW	JPN	Masahito Noto (from (Laos) Lanexang United)
13	DF	IDN	Yudi Khoerudin (from (Indonesia) Persis Solo)
14	FW	IDN	Bijahil Chalwa (from (Indonesia) Persebaya Surabaya)
15	MF	IDN	Ridho Nurcahyo (from (Indonesia) Cilegon United)
16	DF	IDN	Satrio Syam (from (Indonesia) Semen Padang)
44	MF	IDN	Achmad Hisyam Tolle (from (Indonesia) Mitra Kukar)
66	MF	IDN	Robi Kriswantoro (from (Indonesia) Persewangi Banyuwangi)
77	MF	IRQ	Anmar Almubaraki (from (Sweden) Syrianska)
87	MF	IDN	M. Ilhamirul Irhaz (from (Indonesia) Perssu Sumenep)
89	GK	IDN	Dedi Heryanto (from (Timor-Leste) Aitana)

Out:

No.	Pos.	Nation	Player
4	DF	IDN	Asep Budi Santoso (to (Indonesia) PSPS Pekanbaru)
5	MF	BRA	Antonio Teles (Released)
6	DF	IDN	Ledi Utomo (to (Indonesia) Persita Tangerang)
8	MF	IDN	Syamsir Alam (Released)
9	FW	BRA	Maycon Calijiuri (to (Cambodia) Boeung Ket Angkor)
11	MF	IDN	Bima Sakti (Retired)
13	MF	IDN	Kurniawan Karman (to (Indonesia) Persebaya Surabaya)
16	DF	IDN	Hermawan (to (Indonesia) Persekam Metro)
17	DF	IDN	Abdul Rachman (to (Indonesia) Pusamania Borneo)
18	FW	JPN	Shohei Matsunaga (to (Indonesia) Persib Bandung)
21	DF	IDN	Hanif Sjahbandi (to (Indonesia) Arema)
25	MF	IDN	Asnawi Bahar (to (Indonesia) PSM Makassar)
27	FW	IDN	Ade Kurniawan (to (Indonesia) Persis Solo)
71	MF	IDN	I Gusti Rustiawan (to (Indonesia) Persegres Gresik United)
77	MF	IDN	Rahel Radiansyah (to (Indonesia) Persegres Gresik United)
78	GK	IDN	Alfonsius Kelvan (to (Indonesia) Bali United)
88	DF	IDN	Abdul Aziz (to (Indonesia) Pusamania Borneo)

=== Persija Jakarta ===
In:

No.	Pos.	Nation	Player
3	MF	IDN	Irfandy Zein (on loan from (Indonesia) PS TNI)
4	DF	IDN	Ryuji Utomo (from (Indonesia) Arema)
9	FW	BRA	Luiz Júnior (on loan from (Indonesia) Madura United)
10	FW	IDN	Rudi Widodo (from (Indonesia) Bhayangkara)
18	MF	IDN	Muhammad Hargianto (on loan from (Indonesia) Bhayangkara)
29	MF	IDN	Sandi Sute (from (Indonesia) Pusamania Borneo)
31	DF	IDN	Arthur Irawan (from free agent)
32	MF	NEP	Rohit Chand (from (Nepal) Manang Marshyangdi)
44	MF	IDN	Muhammad Rasul (to (Indonesia) PSM Makassar U-21)
50	FW	BRA	Bruno Lopes (from (Brazil) Ferroviária)
70	FW	IDN	Pandi Lestaluhu (on loan from (Indonesia) PS TNI)
77	FW	IDN	Jefri Kurniawan (from (Indonesia) Pusamania Borneo)

Out:

No.	Pos.	Nation	Player
4	DF	IDN	Rendika Rama (to (Indonesia) Madura United)
10	FW	IDN	Greg Nwokolo (to (Indonesia) Madura United)
11	FW	IDN	Rachmat Afandi (to (Indonesia) Persebaya Surabaya)
13	MF	KOR	Hong Soon-hak (to (Indonesia) PS TNI)
15	MF	IDN	Syahroni (to (Indonesia) Barito Putera)
19	FW	IDN	Ade Jantra (to (Indonesia) PS TNI)
31	GK	IDN	Reky Rahayu (to (Indonesia) Persita Tangerang)
59	FW	CMR	Emmanuel Kenmogne (Released)
87	FW	BRA	Rodrigo Tosi (to (Republic of Ireland) Limerick)
-	FW	IDN	Aldi Al Achya (to (Indonesia) Persita Tangerang)

=== Persipura Jayapura ===
In:

No.	Pos.	Nation	Player
6	MF	IDN	Elisa Basna (from (Indonesia) Persipura Jayapura U-21)
7	MF	IDN	Israel Wamiau (from (Indonesia) PON Papua)
10	MF	ARG	Robertino Pugliara (from (Indonesia) Persib Bandung)
16	MF	IDN	Pietr Nasadit (from (Indonesia) PON Papua)
20	FW	BRA	Addison Alves (from (Thailand) Navy)
26	MF	IDN	Alvian Sanyi (from (Indonesia) Persipura Jayapura U-21)

Out:

No.	Pos.	Nation	Player
10	MF	ARG	Robertino Pugliara (Released)
20	GK	IDN	Ferdiansyah (to (Indonesia) Persela Lamongan)
49	DF	IDN	Jaelaniu Arey (Released)

=== PS TNI ===
In:

No.	Pos.	Nation	Player
2	DF	ARG	Facundo Talín (from (Argentina) Almirante Brown)
4	MF	KOR	Hong Soon-Hak (from (Indonesia) Persija Jakarta)
6	DF	IDN	Danie Pratama (from (Indonesia) PS TNI U-21)
8	MF	IDN	Muhammad Alwi Slamat (from (Indonesia) Semen Padang)
9	MF	GUI	Aboubacar Sylla (from (Guinea) AS Kaloum)
17	FW	IDN	Ahmad Nufiandani (from (Indonesia) Arema)
19	FW	ARG	Leonel Núñez (from free agent)
20	MF	IDN	Steven Imbiri (from (Malaysia) MIFA)
25	DF	GUI	Aboubacar Camara (from (Guinea) AS Kaloum)
28	DF	IDN	Muhammad Kasim Slamat (from (Indonesia) PS TNI U-21)
29	FW	POR	Élio Martins (from (Lebanon) Al-Akhaa)
37	MF	IDN	Agil Munawar (from (Indonesia) PON Jawa Barat)
67	MF	IDN	Yoga Ardiansyah (from free agent)
68	DF	IDN	Roni Ariyanto (from (Indonesia) PS TNI U-21)
71	MF	IDN	Yus Arfandy (from (Indonesia) Persegres Gresik United)
88	DF	IDN	Safri Al Irfandi (from (Indonesia) PSMS Medan)
89	FW	IDN	Sansan Husaeni (from (Indonesia) Persikad Depok)
90	DF	IDN	Rinto Ali (from (Indonesia) Cilegon United)
97	DF	IDN	Andy Setyo (from (Indonesia) PS TNI U-21)
99	FW	IDN	Gustur Cahyo Putro (from (Indonesia) PS TNI U-21)
-	FW	IDN	Ade Jantra (from (Indonesia) Persija Jakarta)

Out:

No.	Pos.	Nation	Player
2	MF	IDN	Jeko Sembiring (Released)
3	DF	IDN	Wiganda Pradika (to (Indonesia) Mitra Kukar)
4	DF	IDN	Hendri Aprilianto (to (Indonesia) Persis Solo)
5	DF	IDN	Syaiful Ramadhan (to (Indonesia) Mitra Kukar)
6	DF	IDN	Romy Agustiawan (to (Indonesia) Pro Duta)
7	FW	IDN	Dimas Drajad (to (Indonesia) PSMS Medan)
9	DF	IDN	Choirul Hidayat (to (Indonesia) PSMS Medan)
9	MF	GUI	Aboubacar Sylla (Released)
11	MF	IDN	Frets Butuan (to (Indonesia) PSMS Medan)
16	MF	IDN	Tri Hardiansyah (to (Indonesia) PSMS Medan)
19	FW	IDN	Aldino Herdianto (to (Indonesia) Mitra Kukar)
21	MF	IDN	Irfandy Zein (loan to (Indonesia) Persija Jakarta)
22	FW	IDN	Tambun Naibaho (to (Indonesia) Semen Padang)
24	MF	IDN	Legimin Raharjo (to (Indonesia) PSMS Medan)
25	FW	IDN	Dwi Cahyono (to (Indonesia) PSIR Rembang)
25	DF	GUI	Aboubacar Camara (Released)
27	DF	IDN	Roni Amrullah (Released)
29	MF	IDN	Suhandi (to (Indonesia) PSMS Medan)
45	DF	IDN	Sobri Assauri Yahya (Released)
69	DF	IDN	Hardiantono (to (Indonesia) PSMS Medan)
77	MF	IDN	Mausan Tuasykal (Released)
88	MF	IDN	Stevanus Bungaran (to (Indonesia) Kalteng Putra)
94	MF	IDN	Iman Faturohman (Released)
99	FW	IDN	Pandi Lestaluhu (loan to (Indonesia) Persija Jakarta)
-	FW	IDN	Ade Jantra (to (Indonesia) Persikad Depok)

=== PSM Makassar ===
In:

No.	Pos.	Nation	Player
6	MF	IDN	Asnawi Bahar (from (Indonesia) Persiba Balikpapan)
9	FW	AUS	Reinaldo Elias (from free agent)
10	MF	NED	Marc Klok (from (Scotland) Dundee)
14	DF	IDN	Fathlul Rahman (from (Indonesia) PS Barito Putera)
15	MF	IDN	Muhammad Arfan (from (Indonesia) PSM Makassar U-21)
20	GK	IDN	Rivki Mokodompit (from (Indonesia) Semen Padang F.C.)
23	DF	IDN	Hamka Hamzah (from (Indonesia) Arema FC)
27	FW	IDN	Ghozali Siregar (from (Indonesia) Persegres Gresik United)
33	DF	IDN	Zulkifli Syukur (from (Indonesia) Pusamania Borneo)
38	DF	IDN	Khalik (from (Indonesia) PSM Makassar U-21)
86	DF	FRA	Steven Paulle (from free agent)

Out:

No.	Pos.	Nation	Player
7	FW	BRA	Luiz Ricardo (to free agent)
9	DF	IDN	Zulvin Zamrun (to (Indonesia) Pusamania Borneo)
24	MF	IDN	Ivan Wahyudi (to free agent)
27	MF	IDN	Maldini Pali (to (Indonesia) Sriwijaya)
33	GK	IDN	Davit Ariyanto (to free agent)
37	FW	IDN	Muchlis Hadi (to (Indonesia) Bhayangkara)
38	FW	NED	Ronald Hikspoors (to free agent)
44	DF	IDN	Hisyam Tolle (to (Indonesia) Mitra Kukar)
87	DF	KOR	Kwon Jun (to free agent)

=== Pusamania Borneo ===
In:

No.	Pos.	Nation	Player
1	GK	IDN	David Ariyanto (from (Indonesia) PSM Makassar)
3	DF	BRA	Helder Lobato (from free agent)
4	DF	BRA	Matheus Lopes (from (Brazil) Tombense)
5	DF	JPN	Kunihiro Yamashita (from free agent)
6	MF	IDN	Asri Akbar (from (Indonesia) Mitra Kukar)
7	MF	IDN	Zulvin Zamrun (from (Indonesia) PSM Makassar)
8	MF	IDN	Dody Alfayed (from (Indonesia) Pusamania Borneo U-21)
10	FW	NZL	Shane Smeltz (from (Australia) Wellington Phoenix)
15	MF	IDN	Habibi (from (Indonesia) Mitra Kukar)
17	DF	IDN	Abdul Rachman (from (Indonesia) Persiba Balikpapan)
25	FW	IDN	Febri Hamzah (from (Indonesia) Arema)
26	DF	IDN	Michael Orah (from (Indonesia) Mitra Kukar)
27	FW	IDN	Patrich Wanggai (from (Indonesia) Madura United)
78	MF	IDN	Riswan Yusman (from free agent)
88	MF	IDN	Abdul Aziz (from (Indonesia) Persiba Balikpapan)

Out:

No.	Pos.	Nation	Player
3	DF	IDN	Zulkifli Syukur (to (Indonesia) PSM Makassar)
3	DF	BRA	Helder Lobato (Released)
4	DF	LBN	Jad Noureddine (to (Indonesia) Arema)
5	MF	IDN	Hendra Ridwan (to (Indonesia) 757 Kepri Jaya)
9	FW	PAR	Pedro Velazquez (Released)
10	FW	BRA	Edilson Tavares (to (Bahrain) Al-Najma)
21	MF	IDN	Sandi Sute (to (Indonesia) Persija Jakarta)
27	MF	IDN	Gerald Pangkali (to (Indonesia) 757 Kepri Jaya)
33	GK	IDN	Dian Agus (Released)
77	MF	IDN	Jefri Kurniawan (to (Indonesia) Persija Jakarta)
88	DF	IDN	Rachmat Latief (to (Indonesia) Persebaya Surabaya)
92	FW	IDN	Fandi Achmad (to (Indonesia) 757 Kepri Jaya)
95	GK	IDN	Gianluca Pandeynuwu (on loan to (Indonesia) PSPS Pekanbaru)

=== Semen Padang ===
In:

No.	Pos.	Nation	Player
6	MF	IDN	Fridolin Kristof Yoku (from (Indonesia) Semen Padang U-21)
9	FW	IDN	Syamsul Bahri (from (Indonesia) Persija Jakarta U-21)
14	FW	IDN	Tambun Naibaho (from (Indonesia) PS TNI)
15	MF	CIV	Didier Zokora (from free agent)
17	MF	KOR	Ko Jae-Sung (from (South Korea) Busan IPark)
21	GK	IDN	Muhammad Ridwan (from (Indonesia) Persib Bandung)
27	DF	IDN	Haidir Ali Lestaluhu (from (Indonesia) Persikad Depok)
75	MF	IDN	Kevin Ivander (from (Indonesia) Semen Padang U-21)
77	MF	IDN	Finno Andrianas (from (Indonesia) Semen Padang U-21)
90	DF	IDN	Boas Atururi (from (Indonesia) Perseru Serui)
99	FW	IDN	Mardiono (from (Indonesia) Persikad Depok)

Out:

No.	Pos.	Nation	Player
3	DF	IDN	Satrio Syam (to (Indonesia) Persiba Balikpapan)
6	MF	KOR	Lee Kil-Hoon (to (Hong Kong) Biu Chun Glory Sky)
9	FW	IDN	Arifan Fitra Masril (to (Indonesia) Persih Tembilahan)
12	GK	IDN	Muhammad Reza Pratama (to (Indonesia) Madura United)
17	FW	IDN	M. Nur Iskandar (to (Indonesia) Sriwijaya)
26	FW	IDN	Christovel Sibi (Released)
27	MF	BIH	Muamer Svraka (to (Bosnia and Herzegovina) FK Olimpik)
28	MF	IDN	Muhammad Alwi Slamat (to (Indonesia) PS TNI)
32	DF	IDN	Defri Rizky (to (Indonesia) PSPS Pekanbaru)
33	GK	IDN	Rivky Mokodompit (to (Indonesia) PSM Makassar)
82	DF	IDN	Arif Satria (to (Indonesia) PSP Padang)
87	MF	IDN	Rosad Setiawan (loan to (Indonesia) Persepam Madura Utama)
95	DF	IDN	Dimas Sumantri (to (Indonesia) PSMS Medan)
96	FW	IDN	Reza Fahlevi Sitorus (to (Indonesia) PSMS Medan)
99	FW	IDN	Mardiono (loan to (Indonesia) Persebaya Surabaya)

=== Sriwijaya ===
In:

No.	Pos.	Nation	Player
5	DF	IDN	Bobby Satria (from (Indonesia) Bali United)
8	MF	IDN	Rachmad Hidayat (from (Indonesia) Persib Bandung)
13	DF	IDN	Yanto Basna (from (Indonesia) Persib Bandung)
14	DF	IDN	Gilang Ginarsa (from (Indonesia) Madura United)
15	FW	IDN	Maldini Pali (from (Indonesia) PSM Makassar)
17	FW	IDN	M. Nur Iskandar (from (Indonesia) Semen Padang F.C.)
18	MF	IDN	Ahmad Maulana Putra (from (Indonesia) Madura United)
20	DF	IDN	Indra Permana (from (Indonesia) Bali United)
22	DF	IDN	Marco Meraudje (from (Indonesia) Sriwijaya U-21)
45	DF	IDN	Bio Paulin (from (Indonesia) Persipura)
55	MF	IDN	Hendra Sandi (from (Indonesia) Bali United)
75	MF	TUN	Tijani Belaïd (from (Greece) Veria)
96	GK	IDN	Rangga Pratama (from (Indonesia) Sriwijaya U-21)

Out:

No.	Pos.	Nation	Player
—	DF	IDN	Ngurah Nanak (to (Indonesia) Bali United)
—	MF	IDN	Wildansyah (to (Indonesia) Persib)
—	DF	IDN	Achmad Jufriyanto (to (Indonesia) Persib)
—	DF	IDN	Supardi (to (Indonesia) Persib)
—	MF	IDN	Firman Utina (to (Indonesia) Bhayangkara)
—	MF	IDN	M. Ridwan (to (Indonesia) PSIS Semarang)
—	DF	BRA	Mauricio Leal (Released)
