= 2017 Persija Jakarta season =

Persija Jakarta
2017 season
- Owner: PT. Persija Jaya Jakarta
- Chairman: Gede Widiade
- Head coach: Stefano Cugurra
- Stadium: Patriot Chandrabhaga; Wibawa Mukti; Manahan
- Liga 1: 4th
- Top goalscorer: League: Bruno da Silva Lopes (10 goals); All: Bruno da Silva Lopes (10 goals)
- Highest home attendance: 29,673 vs Persela (27 August 2017)
- Lowest home attendance: 0 vs Sriwijaya (16 June 2017)
- Average home league attendance: 23,004
- Biggest win: Persija Jakarta 5-0 Persegres Gresik United; 2017 Liga 1; 14 October 2017
- Biggest defeat: Persipura Jayapura 3-0 Persija Jakarta; 2017 Liga 1; 18 October 2017
Home colours	Away colours	Third colours

The 2017 season is Persija's 84th competitive season. Along with Liga 1, the club competed in several pre-season cup tournaments, the most notable among those was the President's Cup. The season covers the period from 1 January 2017 to 31 December 2017.

== Month by month review ==
Before the season begins, Persija Jakarta had followed the preseason tournament, the President Cup. Different from the previous year, now the club dubbed "Macan Kemayoran" it failed to achieve the preseason title for the second time.

== Coaching staff ==
Position	Staff
First-team coach	(Brazil) Alessandro Stefano Cugurra Rodrigues
Assistant coach	(Indonesia) Mustaqim
Assistant coach	(Indonesia) Yogie Nugraha
Goalkeeper coach	(Indonesia) Ahmad Fauzi
Physioterapy	(Indonesia) Muhammad Yanizar Lubis
Team doctor	(Indonesia) Donny Kurniawan

=== Other information ===
Chairman	(Indonesia) Gede Widiade
Manager	(Indonesia) Ardhi Tjahjoko
Chief Operating Officer	(Indonesia) Muhammad Rafil Perdana
Assistant Manager	(Indonesia) Abel Anmas
Match Organizing Committee	(Indonesia) Arief Perdanakusuma
Club Secretary	(Indonesia) Edy Syahputra
Media Officer	(Indonesia) Darwis Satmoko
Chief Commercial Officer	(Indonesia) Andhika Suksamana
Ground (capacity and dimensions)	Patriot Candrabhaga Stadium (30,000 / 105x65 metres)
Training Ground	Lapangan Sutasoma 77

== Squad information ==
=== First-team squad ===
No.	Name	Nat.	Date of birth (age)	Signed in	Contract until	Signed from	Transfer Fee	Notes
Goalkeepers
26	Andritany Ardhiyasa	(Indonesia)	26 December 1991 (age 34)	2010		(Indonesia) Sriwijaya FC	?	2nd Vice Captain
30	Muhammad Rizky Darmawan	(Indonesia)	5 February 1994 (age 32)	2015		(Indonesia) Villa 2000 FC	?	Under-23 Player
34	Daryono	(Indonesia)	5 March 1994 (age 32)	2013		(Indonesia) Persija Jakarta U-21	?	Under-23 Player
Defenders
4	Ryuji Utomo Prabowo	(Indonesia)	1 July 1995 (age 31)	2017		(Indonesia) Arema FC	?	Under-23 Player
5	Vava Mario Yagalo	(Indonesia)	21 April 1993 (age 33)	2014		(Indonesia) Persebaya Surabaya	?	
6	Maman Abdurrahman	(Indonesia)	12 May 1982 (age 44)	2016		(Indonesia) Persita Tangerang	?	
13	Gunawan Dwi Cahyo	(Indonesia)	20 April 1989 (age 37)	2015		(Indonesia) Mitra Kukar	?	
14	Ismed Sofyan	(Indonesia)	28 August 1979 (age 47)	2002		(Indonesia) Persijatim Jakarta Timur	?	Captain
24	Evraim Awes Toncy	(Indonesia)		2017			?	Under-23 Player
28	Muhammad Rezaldi Hehanusa	(Indonesia)	7 November 1995 (age 31)	2016		(Indonesia) Persitangsel Tangerang Selatan	?	Under-23 Player
33	Willian Pacheco	(Brazil)	6 October 1992 (age 34)	2016		(Brazil) Rio Branco Football Club	?	Foreign Player
85	Michael Yansen Orah	(Indonesia)	3 July 1985 (age 41)	2017		(Indonesia) Borneo FC	?	
Midfielders
3	Irfandy Zein Alzubeidy	(Indonesia)	29 August 1995 (age 31)	2017		(Indonesia) PS TNI	?	Under-23 Player
7	Rizky Ramdani Lestaluhu	(Indonesia)	5 November 1991 (age 35)	2014		(Indonesia) Sriwijaya FC	?	
8	Sutanto Tan	(Indonesia)	4 May 1994 (age 32)	2016		(Indonesia) Mitra Kukar	?	Under-23 Player
11	Novri Setiawan	(Indonesia)	11 November 1993 (age 33)	2014		(Indonesia) Persebaya Surabaya	?	
18	Muhammad Hargianto	(Indonesia)	24 July 1996 (age 30)	2017		(Indonesia) Bhayangkara FC	?	Under-23 Player
21	Amarzukih	(Indonesia)	21 June 1984 (age 42)	2010		(Indonesia) Persitara Jakarta Utara	?	
23	Fitra Ridwan Salam	(Indonesia)	16 March 1994 (age 32)	2017		(Indonesia) Persegres Gresik United	?	Under-23 Player
29	Sandi Darma Sute	(Indonesia)	20 September 1992 (age 34)	2017	2018	(Indonesia) Borneo FC	?	
32	Rohit Chand Thakuri	(Nepal)	1 March 1992 (age 34)	2017	2017	(Nepal) Manang Marshyangdi	?	Foreign Player
70	Pandi Ahmad Lestaluhu	(Indonesia)	7 August 1997 (age 29)	2017		(Indonesia) PS TNI		Under-23 Player
Forwards
10	Rudi Widodo	(Indonesia)	13 July 1983 (age 43)	2017		(Indonesia) Bhayangkara FC	?	
17	Ambrizal Umanailo	(Indonesia)	21 June 1996 (age 30)	2015		(Indonesia) Villa 2000 FC	?	Under-23 Player
20	Bambang Pamungkas	(Indonesia)	10 June 1980 (age 46)	2015		(Indonesia) Pelita Bandung Raya	?	Vice Captain
50	Bruno da Silva Lopes	(Brazil)	19 August 1986 (age 40)	2017	2017	(Brazil) Associação Ferroviária de Esportes	?	Marquee player
88	Reinaldo Elias da Costa	(Australia)	13 June 1984 (age 42)	2017		(Indonesia) PSM Makassar	?	Foreign player

== New contracts ==
No.	Pos	Player	Contract length	Contract end	Date	Source

== Transfers ==
=== In ===
No.	Pos	Player	Transferred From	Fee	Date	Source
29	CM	(Indonesia) Sandi Darma Sute	(Indonesia) Borneo FC	Free	11 January 2017	
77	LM	(Indonesia) Jefri Kurniawan	(Indonesia) Borneo FC	Free	11 January 2017	
10	CF	(Indonesia) Rudi Widodo	(Indonesia) Bhayangkara FC	Free	21 January 2017	
3	CB	(Indonesia) Ryuji Utomo Prabowo	(Indonesia) Arema FC	Free	4 February 2017	
44	CM	(Indonesia) Muhammad Rasul	Talent Scouting	Free	21 February 2017	
31	CB	(Indonesia) Arthur Irawan	Free Agent	Free	28 March 2017	
32	CM	(Nepal) Rohit Chand Thakuri	(Nepal) Manang Marshyangdi	Free	7 April 2017	
50	CF	(Brazil) Bruno da Silva Lopes	(Brazil) Associação Ferroviária de Esportes	Free	21 April 2017	
88	ST	(Australia) Reinaldo Elias da Costa	(Indonesia) PSM Makassar	Free	8 August 2017	

=== Out ===
No.	Pos	Player	Transferred To	Fee	Date	Source
59	ST	(Belgium) Emmanuel Kenmogne	Retired	Retired	31 December 2016	
87	ST	(Brazil) Rodrigo Tosi	(Republic of Ireland) Limerick FC	Free	31 December 2016	
10	CF	(Indonesia) Greg Nwokolo	(Indonesia) Madura United F.C.	Free	11 January 2017	
4	LB	(Indonesia) Andik Rendika Rama	(Indonesia) Madura United F.C.	Free	16 January 2017	
15	CM	(Indonesia) Syahroni	(Indonesia) Barito Putera	Free	16 January 2017	
32	CM	(South Korea) Hong Soon-Hak	(Indonesia) PS TNI	Free	17 April 2017	
9	ST	(Brazil) Luiz Júnior	(Indonesia) Madura United F.C.	End of Loan	4 August 2017	

=== Loan In ===
No.	Pos	Player	Loaned From	Start	End	Source
70	RM	(Indonesia) Pandi Lestaluhu	(Indonesia) PS TNI	4 February 2017	31 December 2017	
3	LM	(Indonesia) Irfandy Zein Alzubeidy	(Indonesia) PS TNI	4 February 2017	31 December 2017	
9	ST	(Brazil) Luiz Júnior	(Indonesia) Madura United F.C.	7 March 2017	4 August 2017	
18	CM	(Indonesia) Muhammad Hargianto	(Indonesia) Bhayangkara FC	22 March 2017	31 December 2017	
85	LB	(Indonesia) Michael Yansen Orah	(Indonesia) Borneo FC	25 July 2017	31 December 2017	

=== Loan Out ===
No.	Pos	Player	Loaned to	Start	End	Source
-	CB	(Indonesia) Muhammad Idham Jauhari	(Indonesia) Cilegon United	14 March 2017	31 December 2017	
44	CM	(Indonesia) Muhammad Rasul	(Indonesia) Sragen United	19 July 2017	31 December 2017	
77	LM	(Indonesia) Jefri Kurniawan	(Indonesia) Borneo FC	25 July 2017	31 December 2017	
31	CB	(Indonesia) Arthur Irawan	(Indonesia) Borneo FC	19 August 2017	31 December 2017	

== Pre-season ==
Win Draw Loss

=== Friendly Matches ===
4 March 2017 Friendly	Persija Jakarta	0-0	Persita Tangerang	Depok, West Java
15:30 (UTC+7)				Stadium: Mako Brimob Kelapa Dua Stadium; Attendance: TBA; Referee: TBA

11 March 2017 Friendly	Persikad Depok	1-3	Persija Jakarta	Depok, West Java
15:15 (UTC+7)	Gasim 84'		Almubaraki 11'; Rasul; Rudi 82'	Stadium: Mako Brimob Kelapa Dua Stadium; Attendance: 0 Referee: TBA

18 March 2017 Friendly	Cilegon United	0-1	Persija Jakarta	Cilegon, Banten
15:00 (UTC+7)			Sandi Sute 17'	Stadium: Krakatau Steel Stadium; Attendance: TBA; Referee: TBA

5 April 2017 Friendly	Persija Jakarta	0-0	Indonesia	Bekasi, West Java
19:00 (UTC+7)				Stadium: Patriot Chandrabhaga Stadium; Attendance: TBA; Referee: TBA

9 April 2017 Friendly	PS TNI	0-0	Persija Jakarta	Cilangkap, East Jakarta
15:00 (UTC+7)				Stadium: Ahmad Yani Stadium Mabes TNI; Attendance: TBA; Referee: TBA

19 July 2017 Friendly	Persija Jakarta	0-7	RCD Espanyol (Spain)	Bekasi, West Java
19:00 (UTC+7)			Moreno 7'; Granero 11', 21'; Jurado 26'; López 42'; Martin 51'; Diop 75'	Stadium: Patriot Chandrabhaga Stadium; Attendance: TBA; Referee: TBA

=== 2017 Bhayangkara Trofeo Cup ===
29 January 2017 2017 Bhayangkara Trofeo Cup match 1	Persija Jakarta	0-0	Bhayangkara F.C.	Surakarta, Central Java
14.30 (UTC+7)				Stadium: Manahan Stadium; Attendance: TBA; Referee: TBA

29 January 2017 2017 Bhayangkara Trofeo Cup match 2	Arema F.C.	1-0	Persija Jakarta	Surakarta, Central Java
15:30 (UTC+7)	Dendi 41'			Stadium: Manahan Stadium; Attendance: TBA; Referee: TBA

=== 2017 Indonesia President's Cup ===
==== Group stage ====
Pos	Team	Pld	W	D	L	GF	GA	GD	Pts	Qualification
1	Arema (H)	3	2	1	0	7	1	+6	7	Knockout stage
2	Bhayangkara	3	2	0	1	3	3	0	6	Knockout stage
3	Persija Jakarta	3	1	1	1	2	2	0	4	
4	PS TNI	3	0	0	3	1	7	−6	0	

Rules for classification: 1) Points; 2) Goal difference; 3) Goals scored; 4) Head-to-head; 5) Drawing.
(H) Hosts

Win Draw Loss

5 February 2017 2017 Indonesia President's Cup Group 2	Persija Jakarta	1-0	PS TNI	Kepanjen, Malang Regency, East Java
18:30 (UTC+7)	Rudi 90+3'	Report		Stadium: Kanjuruhan Stadium; Attendance: 581; Referee: Kusni (Samarinda)

11 February 2017 2017 Indonesia President's Cup Group 2	Arema F.C.	1-1	Persija Jakarta	Kepanjen, Malang Regency, East Java
18:30 (UTC+7)	Gonzáles 23'	Report	Jhonatan 12'	Stadium: Kanjuruhan Stadium; Attendance: 29,389; Referee: Hadiyana (Bekasi)

16 February 2017 2017 Indonesia President's Cup Group 2	Persija Jakarta	0-1	Bhayangkara F.C.	Kepanjen, Malang Regency, East Java
18:30 (UTC+7)		Report	Ilham 85'	Stadium: Kanjuruhan Stadium; Attendance: 1,680; Referee: Thoriq Munir Alkatiri (Bandung)

=== 2017 Cilacap Cup ===
24 March 2017 Semifinal	Persija Jakarta	0-2	Madura United F.C.	Cilacap, Central Java
15:30 (UTC+7)		Report	Slamet 12', 85'	Stadium: Wijayakusuma Stadium; Attendance: TBA; Referee: TBA

25 March 2017 Bronze Medal Match	Persija Jakarta	1-0	PSCS Cilacap	Cilacap, Central Java
15:30 (UTC+7)	Rasul 37'	Report		Stadium: Wijayakusuma Stadium; Attendance: TBA; Referee: TBA

== Competitions ==
=== Overview ===
Competition	Record								Started round	Final position / round	First match	Last match
Competition	G	W	D	L	GF	GA	GD	Win %	Started round	Final position / round	First match	Last match
Liga 1	34	17	10	7	48	24	+24	50.00	—	4th	15 April 2017	12 November 2017
Total	34	17	10	7	48	24	+24	50.00				

Updated to match played 23 November 2017
Source: Competitions

=== Liga 1 ===

Persija XI Go-Jek Traveloka Liga 1 2017

==== League table ====
Locations of the 2017 Liga 1 teams

Pos	Team	Pld	W	D	L	GF	GA	GD	Pts	Qualification or relegation
2	Bali United	34	21	5	8	76	38	+38	68 (Note: Head-to-head results: Bali United 1–3 Bhayangkara; Bhayangkara 3–2 Bali United.)	Qualification for the AFC Champions League preliminary round 1 (Note: Bhayangkara failed to obtain an AFC license to participate in Asian competitions. As a result, Bali United, the league runners-up, entered the qualifying play-offs.)
3	PSM	34	19	8	7	67	38	+29	65	
4	Persija	34	17	10	7	48	24	+24	61	Qualification for the AFC Cup group stage (Note: PSM failed to obtain an AFC license to participate in Asian competitions. As a result, Persija, the league 4th place, entered the group stage.)
5	Persipura	34	17	9	8	64	37	+27	60	
6	Madura United (Note: Madura United were deducted three points due to FIFA sanction. Madura United would have qualified for the AFC Cup group stage had Bali United qualified for the AFC Champions League group stage. As Bali United failed to qualify for the AFC Champions League group stage, Madura United's qualification in the AFC Cup was annulled.)	34	17	9	8	58	44	+14	57	

Source: Go-Jek Traveloka Liga 1, Soccerway
Rules for classification: 1) Points; 2) Head-to-head; 3) Goal Difference; 4) Goals Scored; 5) Drawing.

==== Results summary ====
Overall								Home						Away					
Pld	W	D	L	GF	GA	GD	Pts	W	D	L	GF	GA	GD	W	D	L	GF	GA	GD
34	17	10	7	48	24	+24	61	11	5	1	29	7	+22	6	5	6	19	17	+2

Last updated: 23 November 2017.
Source: Soccerway

==== Results by matchday ====
Matchday	1	2	3	4	5	6	7	8	9	10	11	12	13	14	15	16	17	18	19	20	21	22	23	24	25	26	27	28	29	30	31	32	33	34
Ground	A	H	A	H	A	H	H	H	A	A	H	A	H	A	H	A	H	A	H	H	A	H	A	A	H	A	H	A	H	A	H	A	H	A
Result	W	D	L	L	L	D	D	W	W	W	W	D	D	D	W	D	W	L	W	D	D	W	W	L	W	D	W	L	W	L	W	W	W	W
Position	3	3	8	13	15	15	15	15	15	15	5	5	9	8	7	6	5	6	6	6	6	6	6	6	6	6	6	6	6	6	6	6	6	4

Updated to match(es) played on 23 November 2017. Source: Matches
A = Away; H = Home; W = Win; D = Draw; L = Loss

==== Matches ====
Win Draw Loss

First round

16 April 2017 1	Persiba Balikpapan	0–2	Persija Jakarta	Malang, East Java
15:00 UTC+7		Report	Luiz Júnior 55'; Rudi 71'	Stadium: Gajayana Stadium; Attendance: 1,306; Referee: Fariq Hitaba (Yogyakarta)

22 April 2017 2	Persija Jakarta	1-1	PS Barito Putera	Bekasi, West Java
15:00 UTC+7	Luiz Júnior 72'	Report	Thiago Cunha 69'	Stadium: Patriot Chandrabhaga Stadium; Attendance: 27,707; Referee: Aprisman Aranda (Padangpanjang)

30 April 2017 3	PSM Makassar	1–0	Persija Jakarta	Makassar, South Sulawesi
19:30 UTC+8	Wiljan Pluim 80'	Report		Stadium: Andi Mattalatta Stadium; Attendance: 12,670; Referee: Thoriq Munir Alkatiri (Bandung)

4 May 2017 4	Persija Jakarta	0–1	Madura United F.C.	Bekasi, West Java
18:30 UTC+7		Report	Odemwingie 69'	Stadium: Patriot Chandrabhaga Stadium; Attendance: 25,400; Referee: Hamsir (Balikpapan)

10 May 2017 5	Persela Lamongan	1-0	Persija Jakarta	Lamongan, East Java
15:00 UTC+7	Ivan Carlos 31'	Report		Stadium: Surajaya Stadium; Attendance: 9,582; Referee: Annas Apriliandi (Bandung)

14 May 2017 6	Persija Jakarta	1-1	Mitra Kukar F.C.	Bekasi, West Java
15:00 UTC+7	Bruno Lopes 37'	Report	Sissoko 90'	Stadium: Patriot Chandrabhaga Stadium; Attendance: 26,120; Referee: Bachrul Ulum (Sidoarjo)

21 May 2017 7	Persija Jakarta	0-0	Bali United F.C.	Bekasi, West Java
18:30 UTC+7		Report		Stadium: Patriot Chandrabhaga Stadium; Attendance: 23,200; Referee: Kusni (Samarinda)

28 May 2017 8 (Postponed)	Perseru Serui	P-P	Persija Jakarta	Yapen Islands Regency, Papua
20:00 UTC+9				Stadium: Marora Stadium
Note: Perseru Serui hosted Persija Jakarta at Patriot Chandrabhaga Stadium because Marora Stadium didn't pass verification to hold a match at night.

2 June 2017 9	Persija Jakarta	2-0	Arema F.C.	Bekasi, West Java
20:30 UTC+7	Bruno Lopes 23'; Rohit 29'	Report		Stadium: Patriot Chandrabhaga Stadium; Attendance: 28,967; Referee: Aprisman Aranda (Padangpanjang)

8 June 2017 10	PS TNI	0-2	Persija Jakarta	Cibinong, Bogor Regency, West Java
20:30 UTC+7		Report	Bruno Lopes 25'; Ramdani 64'	Stadium: Pakansari Stadium; Attendance: 18,288; Referee: Fariq Hitaba (Yogyakarta)

13 June 2017 8 (Replacement Match)	Perseru Serui	0-3	Persija Jakarta	Bekasi, West Java
20:30 UTC+7		Report	Willian 16'; Bruno Lopes 57'; Novri 89'	Stadium: Patriot Chandrabhaga Stadium; Attendance: 12,954; Referee: Tabrani (Surabaya)

16 June 2017 11	Persija Jakarta	1-0	Sriwijaya F.C.	Cikarang, Bekasi Regency, West Java
20:30 UTC+7	Willian 3'	Report		Stadium: Wibawa Mukti Stadium; Attendance: 0 Referee: Dodi Setia Purnama (Indramayu)

4 July 2017 12	Persegres Gresik United	1-1	Persija Jakarta	Gresik, East Java
15:00 UTC+7	Rustiawan 28'	Report	Luiz Júnior 9'	Stadium: Tri Dharma Stadium; Attendance: 0 Referee: Handri Kristanto (Semarang)

8 July 2017 13	Persija Jakarta	1-1	Persipura Jayapura	Bekasi, West Java
18:30 UTC+7	Willian 53'	Report	Addison 50'	Stadium: Patriot Chandrabhaga Stadium; Attendance: 26,625; Referee: Yeni Krisdianto (Tulungagung)

12 July 2017 14	Semen Padang F.C.	1-1	Persija Jakarta	Padang, West Sumatera
15:00 UTC+7	Cássio 58'	Report	Ramdani 48'	Stadium: Haji Agus Salim Stadium; Attendance: 5,618; Referee: Faulur Rosy (Banda Aceh)

16 July 2017 15	Persija Jakarta	1-0	Borneo F.C.	Bekasi, West Java
15:00 UTC+7	Rohit 18'	Report		Stadium: Patriot Chandrabhaga Stadium; Attendance: 22,959; Referee: Bachrul Ulum (Sidoarjo)

22 July 2017 16	Persib Bandung	1-1	Persija Jakarta	Bandung, West Java
18:30 UTC+7	Jufriyanto 15'	Report	Ramdani 19'	Stadium: Gelora Bandung Lautan Api Stadium; Attendance: 36,545; Referee: Aprisman Aranda (Padangpanjang)

29 July 2017 17	Persija Jakarta	1-0	Bhayangkara F.C.	Bekasi, West Java
18:30 UTC+7	Bruno Lopes 90+1'	Report		Stadium: Patriot Chandrabhaga Stadium; Attendance: 29,640; Referee: Yudi Nurcahya (Bandung)

Second Round

6 August 2017 18	PS Barito Putera	1-0	Persija Jakarta	Banjarmasin, South Kalimantan
19:30 UTC+8	M. Rifqi 57'	Report		Stadium: 17 May Stadium; Attendance: 5,909; Referee: Faulur Rosy (Banda Aceh)

12 August 2017 19	Persija Jakarta	2-0	Persiba Balikpapan	Bekasi, West Java
15:00 UTC+7	Reinaldo 45+2'; Bruno Lopes 60' (pen.)	Report		Stadium: Patriot Chandrabhaga Stadium; Attendance: 28,949; Referee: Rysbek Shekerbekov (Kyrgyzstan)

15 August 2017 20	Persija Jakarta	2-2	PSM Makassar	Bekasi, West Java
15:00 UTC+7	Reinaldo 63' (pen.); Bruno Lopes 65'	Report	Marc Klok 22' (pen.); Wiljan Pluim 33'	Stadium: Patriot Chandrabhaga Stadium; Attendance: 12,996; Referee: Mooud Bonyadifar (Iran)

21 August 2017 21	Madura United F.C.	1-1	Persija Jakarta	Pamekasan, East Java
18:30 UTC+7	Greg 64'	Report	Willian 69'	Stadium: Gelora Ratu Pamelingan Stadium; Attendance: 5,202; Referee: Spartak Danilenko (Kyrgyzstan)

27 August 2017 22	Persija Jakarta	2-0	Persela Lamongan	Bekasi, West Java
18:30 UTC+7	Ramdani 24'; Reinaldo 83'	Report		Stadium: Patriot Chandrabhaga Stadium; Attendance: 29,673; Referee: Oki Dwi Putra Senjaya (Bandung)

8 September 2017 23	Mitra Kukar F.C.	1-2	Persija Jakarta	Tenggarong, East Kalimantan
19:30 UTC+8	Marclei 41' (pen.)	Report	Bruno Lopes 47'; Ramdani 54'	Stadium: Aji Imbut Stadium; Attendance: 12,996; Referee: Annas Apriliandi (Bandung)

15 September 2017 24	Bali United F.C.	2-1	Persija Jakarta	Gianyar, Bali
19:30 UTC+8	Sylvano 11'; Irfan 18'	Report	Bambang 62'	Stadium: Kapten I Wayan Dipta Stadium; Attendance: 21,000; Referee: Yeni Krisdianto (Tulungagung)

19 September 2017 25	Persija Jakarta	1-0	Perseru Serui	Bekasi, West Java
15:00 UTC+7	Willian 30'	Report		Stadium: Patriot Chandrabhaga Stadium; Attendance: 9,523; Referee: Ikhsan Prasetya Jati (Bantul)

24 September 2017 26	Arema F.C.	1-1	Persija Jakarta	Malang Regency, East Java
18:30 UTC+7	Vizcarra 81'	Report	Bambang 34'	Stadium: Kanjuruhan Stadium; Attendance: 26,917; Referee: Yudi Nurcahya (Bandung)

30 September 2017 27	Persija Jakarta	4-1	PS TNI	Bekasi, West Java
18:30 UTC+7	Fitra 13'; Rezaldi 41'; Rudi 71'; Novri 83'	Report	Sansan 21'	Stadium: Patriot Chandrabhaga Stadium; Attendance: 29,669; Referee: Alireza Faghani (Iran)

7 October 2017 28	Sriwijaya F.C.	1-0	Persija Jakarta	Palembang, South Sumatera
15:00 UTC+7	Beto 77'	Report		Stadium: Bumi Sriwijaya Stadium; Attendance: 5,273; Referee: Rully Ruslin Tambuntina (Malang)

14 October 2017 29	Persija Jakarta	5-0	Persegres Gresik United	Bekasi, West Java
15:00 UTC+7	Rudi 42', 62'; Fitra 55'; Rohit 67'; Bruno 79' (pen.)	Report		Stadium: Patriot Chandrabhaga Stadium; Attendance: 25,167; Referee: Dodi Setia Purnama (Indramayu)

18 October 2017 30	Persipura Jayapura	3-0	Persija Jakarta	Jayapura, Papua
15:30 UTC+9	Boaz 64', 85', 88'	Report		Stadium: Mandala Stadium; Attendance: 13,763; Referee: Timur Faizullin (Kyrgyzstan)

22 October 2017 31	Persija Jakarta	2-0	Semen Padang F.C.	Bekasi, West Java
18:30 UTC+7	Bambang 69', 90'	Report		Stadium: Patriot Chandrabhaga Stadium; Attendance: 27,486; Referee: Alireza Faghani (Iran)

28 October 2017 32	Borneo F.C.	1-2	Persija Jakarta	Samarinda, East Kalimantan
19:30 UTC+8	Sultan 51'	Report	Ramdani 77'; Bambang 82'	Stadium: Segiri Stadium; Attendance: 8,790; Referee: Timur Faizullin (Kyrgyzstan)

3 November 2017 33	Persija Jakarta	3–0; Awarded (Note: Persib Bandung abandoned the match at minute 82. Match was awarded 3–0 to Persija Jakarta as a walkover.)	Persib Bandung	Surakarta, Central Java
15.00 UTC+7	Bruno Lopes 76' (pen.)	Report		Stadium: Manahan Stadium; Attendance: 17,293; Referee: Evans Shaun Roberts (Australia)
Note: Persija Jakarta hosted Persib Bandung at Manahan Stadium because it did not get the police permit.

12 November 2017 34	Bhayangkara F.C.	1-2	Persija Jakarta	Bekasi, West Java
18.30 UTC+7	Spasojević 3'	Report	Ramdani 45+2', 84'	Stadium: Patriot Chandrabhaga Stadium; Attendance: 29,397; Referee: Yeni Krisdianto (Tulungagung)

== Statistics ==
=== Appearances ===
No.	Pos.	Name	Liga 1		Total		Discipline	
No.	Pos.	Name	Apps	Goals	Apps	Goals	Yellow card	Red card
3	MF	(Indonesia) Irfandy Zein Alzubeidy	7 (2)	0	7 (2)	0	1	0
4	DF	(Indonesia) Ryuji Utomo Prabowo	6 (3)	0	6 (3)	0	5	0
5	DF	(Indonesia) Vava Mario Yagalo	6 (4)	0	6 (4)	0	1	0
6	DF	(Indonesia) Maman Abdurrahman	28 (3)	0	28 (3)	0	2	0
7	MF	(Indonesia) Rizky Ramdani Lestaluhu	15 (5)	8	15 (5)	8	1	0
8	MF	(Indonesia) Sutanto Tan	7 (13)	0	7 (13)	0	3	0
10	FW	(Indonesia) Rudi Widodo	12 (9)	4	12 (9)	4	3	0
11	MF	(Indonesia) Novri Setiawan	15 (10)	2	15 (10)	2	4	0
13	DF	(Indonesia) Gunawan Dwi Cahyo	8 (5)	0	8 (5)	0	1	0
14	DF	(Indonesia) Ismed Sofyan	27	0	27	0	3	0
17	FW	(Indonesia) Ambrizal Umanailo	10 (6)	0	10 (6)	0	4	0
18	MF	(Indonesia) Muhammad Hargianto	11 (5)	0	11 (5)	0	3	0
20	FW	(Indonesia) Bambang Pamungkas	18 (6)	5	18 (6)	5	1	0
21	MF	(Indonesia) Amarzukih	1 (5)	0	1 (5)	0	1	0
23	MF	(Indonesia) Fitra Ridwan Salam	8 (6)	2	8 (6)	2	1	0
24	DF	(Indonesia) Evraim Awes Toncy	0	0	0	0	0	0
26	GK	(Indonesia) Andritany Ardhiyasa	33	0	33	0	3	0
28	DF	(Indonesia) Muhammad Rezaldi Hehanusa	20	1	20	1	2	0
29	DF	(Indonesia) Sandi Darma Sute	28	0	28	0	10	3
30	GK	(Indonesia) Muhammad Rizky Darmawan	1	0	1	0	0	0
32	MF	(Nepal) Rohit Chand Thakuri	26 (2)	3	26 (2)	3	1	0
33	DF	(Brazil) Willian Pacheco	30	5	30	5	4	0
34	GK	(Indonesia) Daryono	0 (1)	0	0 (1)	0	0	0
50	FW	(Brazil) Bruno da Silva Lopes	27 (2)	10	27 (2)	10	5	0
70	MF	(Indonesia) Pandi Ahmad Lestaluhu	2 (8)	0	2 (8)	0	0	0
85	DF	(Indonesia) Michael Yansen Orah	7 (2)	0	7 (2)	0	0	0
88	FW	(Australia) Reinaldo Elias da Costa	5	3	5	3	0	0
Players who left the club in transfer window or on loan
9	FW	(Brazil) Luiz Júnior	13 (2)	3	13 (2)	3	4	1
31	DF	(Indonesia) Arthur Irawan	0 (1)	0	0 (1)	0	0	0
44	MF	(Indonesia) Muhammad Rasul	2 (1)	0	2 (1)	0	0	0
77	MF	(Indonesia) Jefri Kurniawan	1 (5)	0	1 (5)	0	0	0

Last updated: 14 November 2017.
Source: Soccerway

=== Top scorers ===
The list is sorted by shirt number when total goals are equal.

Rnk	Pos	No.	Player	Liga 1	Total
1	FW	50	(Brazil) Bruno da Silva Lopes	10	10
2	MF	7	(Indonesia) Rizky Ramdani Lestaluhu	8	8
3	FW	20	(Indonesia) Bambang Pamungkas	5	5
3	DF	33	(Brazil) Willian Pacheco	5	5
4	FW	10	(Indonesia) Rudi Widodo	4	4
5	FW	9	(Brazil) Luiz Júnior	3	3
5	MF	32	(Nepal) Rohit Chand Thakuri	3	3
5	FW	88	(Australia) Reinaldo Elias da Costa	3	3
6	MF	11	(Indonesia) Novri Setiawan	2	2
6	MF	23	(Indonesia) Fitra Ridwan Salam	2	2
7	DF	28	(Indonesia) Muhammad Rezaldi Hehanusa	1	1
#	Own goals			0	0
Total				46	46

Last updated: 14 November 2017.
Source: Soccerway

=== Top assist ===
The list is sorted by shirt number when total assists are equal.

Rnk	Pos	No.	Player	Liga 1	Total
1	DF	14	(Indonesia) Ismed Sofyan	4	4
1	MF	32	(Nepal) Rohit Chand Thakuri	4	4
2	MF	18	(Indonesia) Muhammad Hargianto	3	3
2	FW	20	(Indonesia) Bambang Pamungkas	3	3
2	DF	28	(Indonesia) Muhammad Rezaldi Hehanusa	3	3
2	FW	50	(Brazil) Bruno da Silva Lopes	3	3
3	FW	10	(Indonesia) Rudi Widodo	2	2
3	MF	11	(Indonesia) Novri Setiawan	2	2
3	MF	32	(Indonesia) Sandi Darma Sute	2	2
4	DF	6	(Indonesia) Maman Abdurrahman	1	1
4	MF	7	(Indonesia) Rizky Ramdani Lestaluhu	1	1
4	MF	8	(Indonesia) Sutanto Tan	1	1
4	MF	27	(Indonesia) Fitra Ridwan Salam	1	1
4	DF	33	(Brazil) Willian Pacheco	1	1
4	DF	85	(Indonesia) Michael Yansen Orah	1	1
4	FW	88	(Australia) Reinaldo Elias da Costa	1	1
Total				33	33

Last updated: 14 November 2017.
Source: Liga 1

=== Clean sheets ===
The list is sorted by shirt number when total clean sheets are equal.

Rnk	No.	Player	Liga 1	Total
1	26	(Indonesia) Andritany Ardhiyasa	14	14
2	39	(Indonesia) Daryono	1	1
Total			14	14

Last updated: 14 November 2017.
Source: Soccerway

=== Top 10 Attendances ===
Date	Time (Kick-off)*	Home	Score	Visitor	Attendance	Stadium	City
27 August 2017	18.30	Persija Jakarta	2-0	Persela Lamongan	29,673	Patriot Chandrabhaga Stadium	Bekasi
30 September 2017	18.30	Persija Jakarta	4-1	PS TNI	29,669	Patriot Chandrabhaga Stadium	Bekasi
29 July 2017	18.30	Persija Jakarta	1-0	Bhayangkara FC	29,640	Patriot Chandrabhaga Stadium	Bekasi
2 June 2017	20.30	Persija Jakarta	2-0	Arema FC	28,967	Patriot Chandrabhaga Stadium	Bekasi
12 August 2017	15.00	Persija Jakarta	2-0	Persiba Balikpapan	28,949	Patriot Chandrabhaga Stadium	Bekasi
22 April 2017	15.00	Persija Jakarta	1-1	Barito Putera	27,707	Patriot Chandrabhaga Stadium	Bekasi
22 October 2017	18.30	Persija Jakarta	2-0	Semen Padang FC	27,486	Patriot Chandrabhaga Stadium	Bekasi
8 July 2017	18.30	Persija Jakarta	1-1	Persipura Jayapura	26,625	Patriot Chandrabhaga Stadium	Bekasi
14 May 2017	15.00	Persija Jakarta	1-1	Mitra Kutai Kartanegara	26,120	Patriot Chandrabhaga Stadium	Bekasi
4 May 2017	18.30	Persija Jakarta	0-1	Madura United F.C.	25,400	Patriot Chandrabhaga Stadium	Bekasi

(*) Time in Western Indonesia Time (UTC +7)

=== Summary ===
Games played	34 (34 Liga 1)
Games won	17 (17 Liga 1)
Games drawn	10 (10 Liga 1)
Games lost	7 (7 Liga 1)
Goals scored	46 (46 Liga 1)
Goals conceded	24 (24 Liga 1)
Goal difference	+22 (+22 Liga 1)
Clean sheets	14 (14 Liga 1)
Yellow cards	65 (65 Liga 1)
Red cards	4 (4 Liga 1)
Most appearances	(Indonesia) Andritany Ardhiyasa (33 appearances)
Top scorer	(Brazil) Bruno da Silva Lopes (10 goals)
Top assist	2 players (4 assist)
Winning Percentage	Overall: 17/34 (50.00%)

Last updated: 14 November 2017.
Source: Liga 1
