= Yulius =

Yulius could be both a masculine given name and a surname. Notable people with this name include:

== Given name ==
- Yulius Mauloko (born 1990), Indonesian footballer
- Yulius Pamungkas (born 2000), Indonesian footballer
- Yulius Selvanus (born 1963), Indonesian governor

== Surname ==
- Obet Yulius (born 1995), Indonesian footballer

== See also ==
- Julius (name)
- Julia gens, one of the most prominent patrician families of ancient Rome
