= Rivky Mokodompit =

Indonesian footballer

Personal information
- Full name: Rivky Deython Mokodompit
- Date of birth: 5 December 1988 (age 37)
- Place of birth: Kotamobagu, Indonesia
- Height: 1.88 m (6 ft 2 in)
- Position: Goalkeeper

Team information
- Current team: Persipura Jayapura
- Number: 88

Youth career
- 2005–2006: Persibom Bolaang Mongondow

Senior career*
Years	Team	Apps	(Gls)
2007–2008	Persibom Bolaang	5	(0)
2008–2009	Persita Tangerang	0	(0)
2009–2010	Persitara	2	(0)
2010–2011	Persita Tangerang	8	(0)
2011–2013	Sriwijaya	36	(0)
2013–2014	Putra Samarinda	16	(0)
2015	Mitra Kukar	2	(0)
2016	Semen Padang	13	(0)
2017–2019	PSM Makassar	76	(0)
2020–2021	Persebaya Surabaya	2	(0)
2021	Dewa United	9	(0)
2022–2023	PSM Makassar	0	(0)
2023	Persiraja Banda Aceh	1	(0)
2023–	Persipura Jayapura	11	(0)

International career^{‡}
2005	Indonesia U20		
2011	Indonesia U23	1	(0)
- * Club domestic league appearances and goals as of 11 January 2025 ‡ National team caps and goals as of 26 March 2018

Rivky Deython Mokodompit (born 5 December 1988) is an Indonesian professional footballer who plays as a goalkeeper for Liga 2 Club Persipura Jayapura.

== Honours ==
Sriwijaya

- Indonesia Super League: 2011–12
- Indonesian Inter Island Cup: 2012

Mitra Kukar

- General Sudirman Cup: 2015

PSM Makassar

- Liga 1: 2022–23
- Piala Indonesia: 2018–19

Persebaya Surabaya

- East Java Governor Cup: 2020

Dewa United

- Liga 2 third place (play-offs): 2021
