= Dinan Yahdian Javier =

Indonesian footballer

Dinan Javier
Personal information
- Full name: Dinan Yahdian Javier
- Date of birth: 6 April 1995 (age 31)
- Place of birth: Bantul, Indonesia
- Height: 1.71 m (5 ft 7 in)
- Position: Forward

Youth career
- 2010–2011: SSB Baturetno
- 2011–2013: Deportivo Indonesia

Senior career*
Years	Team	Apps	(Gls)
2015–2016	Mitra Kukar	29	(6)
2017	Bhayangkara	9	(1)
2017	Borneo	3	(0)
Total		41	(7)

International career
2013–2014	Indonesia U19	13	(0)

Managerial career
- 2023–: Bhayangkara youth
Medal record
Men's football
Representing Indonesia
AFF U-19 Youth Championship
Winner	2013 Indonesia
- * Club domestic league appearances and goals

Dinan Yahdian Javier (born 6 April 1995) is an Indonesian former footballer who played as a forward.

== International career ==
Javier was born in Bantul. In 2013, he was called up to the under-19 team for the 2013 AFF U-19 Youth Championship. In this championship, the team won the AFF Cup for the first time. Two weeks later, the team qualified for the 2014 AFC U-19 Championship for the 16th time, losing all three of its games in the opening group stage.

== Personal life ==
He is a graduate of Yogyakarta State University (UNY), the Faculty of Sports Science with a concentration in sports coaching education.

== Honours ==
=== International ===
Indonesia U19

- AFF U-19 Youth Championship: 2013
