= Luiz Júnior (footballer, born 1990) =

Brazilian footballer

Personal information
- Full name: Luiz Carlos Caetano de Azevedo Júnior
- Date of birth: 23 April 1990 (age 36)
- Place of birth: Niterói, Brazil
- Height: 1.80 m (5 ft 11 in)
- Position: Forward

Youth career
- Botafogo

Senior career*
Years	Team	Apps	(Gls)
2009–2016	Botafogo	13	(1)
2011	→ Duque de Caxias (loan)		
2011	→ Anagennisi Epanomi (loan)	1	(0)
2012	→ Marcílio Dias (loan)		
2012	→ Bangu (loan)		
2016	Barito Putera	30	(17)
2017	Madura United		
2017	→ Persija Jakarta (loan)	15	(3)
2017	Al-Jazeera		
2017	Mirbat		
2018	El Mokawloon	5	(0)
2019	Sabah	3	(2)
2020–2021	Tanjong Pagar United	32	(18)
2022	Águila	16	(3)
2022–2023	Fortis	7	(1)
2023	Persiba Balikpapan	5	(0)

International career
2007	Brazil U17	4	(1)
- * Club domestic league appearances and goals as of 7 October 2023

Luiz Carlos Caetano de Azevedo Júnior (born 23 April 1990), commonly known as Luiz Júnior, is a Brazilian professional footballer who plays as a striker.

== Early life ==
Júnior was born in Niterói.

== Club career ==
=== Botafogo ===
While at Botafogo, Junior played against a teenage Neymar during his debut season at Santos.

=== Madura United ===
He first played in Indonesian football competitions with Barito Putera in 2016 season.

Junior signed for Madura United for the 2017 Indonesia Super League.

=== Persija Jakarta ===
Junior signed for the capital club on loan from Madura United but was officially released by Persija Jakarta at the end of the first round of League 1 2017. The capital club was not satisfied with Luis's performance, who only scored three goals in the 15 games he played. However, he was not welcomed back at his parent club as they already had all of their foreign signing slots filled.

=== Sabah FA ===
Junior signed for Malaysian side Sabah for the 2019 Malaysia Premier League season but was released in May after scoring 4 goals.

=== Tanjong Pagar United ===
Junior signed for Tanjong Pagar United for the 2020 Singapore Premier League season. The Jaguars' Head Coach Hairi Su'ap said it took less than five minutes of footage for him to be sold on Junior, who played for Sabah last year.

== International career ==
In 2007, Junior was part of Brazil's team for the Under-17 World Cup in South Korea, scoring in the group stage against New Zealand, before the team were knocked out in the last 16 by fourth-placed Ghana. Junior was also named in Brazil's squad for the 2007 Pan American Games, and he scored a goal in the group stage, but lost 2–4 against Colombia.

He also progressed to Brazil's Under-20s, where he played alongside former Chelsea playmaker Oscar and Juventus left-back Alex Sandro.

== Career statistics ==
As of 02 October 2021

Appearances and goals by club, season and competition
Club	Season	League			National cup (Note: Includes Piala Indonesia, Malaysia Cup, Singapore Cup.)		League cup		Continental		Total	
Club	Season	Division	Apps	Goals	Apps	Goals	Apps	Goals	Apps	Goals	Apps	Goals
Barito Putera	2015	Indonesia Super League	30	17	0	0	0	0	0	0	30	17
Madura United	2017	Liga 1	0	0	0	0	0	0	0	0	0	0
Persija Jakarta	2017	Liga 1	15	3	0	0	0	0	0	0	15	3
Al-Jazeera Club	2017–18	Jordanian Pro League	0	0	0	0	0	0	0	0	0	0
Mirbat	2017–18	Oman Professional League	0	0	0	0	0	0	0	0	0	0
El Mokawloon	2018–19	Egyptian Premier League	6	0	0	0	0	0	0	0	6	0
Sabah	2019	Malaysia Premier League	0	4	1	0	0	0	0	0	0	4
Tanjong Pagar United	2020	Singapore Premier League	14	7	0	0	0	0	0	0	14	7
Tanjong Pagar United	2021	Singapore Premier League	18	11	0	0	0	0	0	0	18	11
Tanjong Pagar United	Total		32	18	0	0	0	0	0	0	32	18
Career total			79	22	8	0	0	0	0	0	88	22

== Honours ==
Botafogo

- Campeonato Carioca: 2010

Individual

- Singapore Premier League Team of the Year: 2020
