= Amarzukih =

Indonesian footballer

Personal information
- Date of birth: 21 June 1984 (age 42)
- Place of birth: Jakarta, Indonesia
- Height: 1.73 m (5 ft 8 in)
- Position: Midfielder

Senior career*
Years	Team	Apps	(Gls)
2004–2010	Persitara North Jakarta	88	(1)
2010–2017	Persija Jakarta	126	(0)
2017–2018	PSMS Medan	6	(0)
2018	PSS Sleman	18	(0)
2019	Persita Tangerang	24	(0)
2020	Persekat Tegal	1	(0)
2021–2022	Farmel	12	(0)
2022–2023	Persipasi Kota Bekasi	10	(0)
2023–2024	Persikota Tangerang	4	(0)
2024	Persipasi Bekasi	0	(0)
- * Club domestic league appearances and goals as of 26 September 2023

Amarzukih (born 21 June 1984) is an Indonesian former footballer who last played for Persipasi Bekasi. Mainly a central midfielder, he can also operate as a full-back, defensive midfielder.

== Club career ==
=== Persita Tangerang ===
He was signed for Persita Tangerang to play in Liga 2 in the 2019 season.

=== Persekat Tegal ===
In 2020, Amarzukih signed a contract with Indonesian Liga 2 club Persekat Tegal. This season was suspended on 27 March 2020 due to the COVID-19 pandemic. The season was abandoned and was declared void on 20 January 2021.

=== Farmel FC ===
He was signed for Farmel F.C. to play in Liga 3 in the 2021 season.

=== Persipasi Kota Bekasi ===
He was signed for Persipasi Kota Bekasi to play in Liga 3 in the 2022 season. On 24 September 2022, Amarzukih made his league debut by starting in a 2–0 win against Persitas Tasikmalaya. And he also playing as a captain for the team.

== Honours ==
=== Club ===
PSS Sleman

- Liga 2: 2018

Persita Tangerang

- Liga 2 runner-up: 2019
