= Bruno Lopes (footballer, born 1986) =

Brazilian footballer

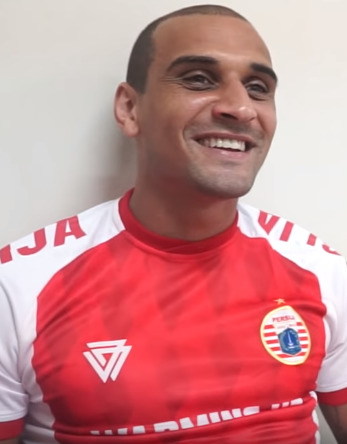
- Bruno Lopes with Persija Jakarta in 2017

Personal information
- Full name: Bruno da Silva Lopes
- Date of birth: 19 August 1986 (age 40)
- Place of birth: Curitiba, Brazil
- Height: 1.81 m (5 ft 11 in)
- Position: Striker

Youth career
- 2004–2006: Figueirense B

Senior career*
Years	Team	Apps	(Gls)
2007–2009	América Mineiro		
2008	→ Joinville (loan)		
2009	→ Mineros (loan)	2	(0)
2009	→ Uberaba (loan)		
2010−2011	Anápolis	4	(3)
2010	→ Vila Nova (loan)	26	(10)
2011	→ Albirex Niigata (loan)	32	(13)
2012−2013	Desportivo	0	(0)
2012−2014	→ Albirex Niigata (loan).	41	(7)
2013−2014	→ Estoril (loan)	31	(3)
2015	Ratchaburi	13	(1)
2015	Vila Nova	0	(0)
2015–2016	Hajer Club	12	(2)
2016–2017	Ferroviária	0	(0)
2017	Persija Jakarta	29	(10)
2018	Kelantan	7	(1)
2018	Montedio Yamagata	10	(2)
2019	Cascavel	0	(0)
2019	Vitória ES	4	(0)
2020	Madura United	0	(0)
2020–2021	Paraná	10	(1)
2021	Madura United	0	(0)
- * Club domestic league appearances and goals

Bruno da Silva Lopes (born 19 August 1986), commonly referred to as Bruno Lopes, is a Brazilian professional footballer who plays as a striker.

== Career ==
=== Vila Nova (loan) ===
While on loan to Vila Nova Lopes scored 10 goals for the club to help it avoid relegation in the Serie B.

=== Albirex Niigata (loan) ===
On 12 January 2011, Bruno Lopes signed for Japanese J1 club Albirex Niigata, a one-year loan with a buyout clause. He made his debut for Albirex in the 3–0 opening round victory against Avispa Fukuoka, in which he scored the second goal of the game.

=== Persija Jakarta ===
On 20 April 2017, Lopes joined the Indonesian club side, Persija Jakarta. He signed a one-year deal with the option to extend his stay for a further two years at the end of the season.

=== Kelantan ===
On 29 December 2017, Lopes signed a one-year contract with Malaysian side Kelantan. Bruno made his league debut for Kelantan in 2–1 defeat to Melaka United on 3 February 2018 and managed to score 1 goal during that match.

He was released by Kelantan in April 2018.

=== Montedio Yamagata ===
Montedio Yamagata announced on 22 November 2018, that Lopes would leave the club at the end of the year, when his contract expired.

== Career statistics ==
As of match played 1 February 2021.

Appearances and goals by club, season and competition
Club	Season	League			Cup (Note: Includes the J.League Cup, Taça da Liga, Copa Paulista, Copa do Brasil, King Cup and Taça de Portugal)		League Cup		Continental (Note: Includes the UEFA Europa League)		Total	
Club	Season	Division	Apps	Goals	Apps	Goals	Apps	Goals	Apps	Goals	Apps	Goals
Vila Nova (loan)	2010	Série B	26	10	–		–		–		26	10
Albirex Niigata (loan)	2011	J1 League	32	13	3	2	–		–		35	15
Albirex Niigata	2012	J1 League	32	7	5	0	–		–		37	5
Albirex Niigata	2013	J1 League	9	0	2	0	–		–		11	0
Albirex Niigata	Total		41	7	7	0	–		–		48	7
Estoril (loan)	2013–14	Primeira Liga	22	3	4	4	–		6	0	32	7
Estoril (loan)	2014–15	Primeira Liga	9	0	–		–		3	0	12	0
Estoril (loan)	Total		31	3	4	4	–		9	0	44	7
Ratchaburi	2015	Thai League 1	13	1	–		–		–		13	1
Vila Nova	2015	Série C	8	1	–		–		–		8	1
Hajer	2015–16	Saudi Professional League	12	2	1	1	–		–		13	3
Ferroviária	2016	Campeonato Paulista	–		11	4	–		–		11	4
Ferroviária	2017	Campeonato Paulista	5	0	1	0	–		–		6	0
Ferroviária	Total		5	0	12	4	–		–		17	4
Persija Jakarta	2017	Liga 1	29	10	–		–		–		29	10
Kelantan	2018	Malaysia Super League	7	1	2	0	0	0	–		9	1
Montedio Yamagata	2018	J2 League	10	2	1	0	–		–		11	2
Cascavel	2019	Campeonato Paranaense	4	0	0	0	–		–		4	0
Vitória ES	2019	Série D	4	0	0	0	–		–		4	0
Madura United	2020	Liga 1 (Indonesia)	0	0	0	0	–		–		0	0
Paraná	2020	Série B	10	1	0	0	–		–		10	1
Career total			232	51	30	11	0	0	9	0	271	62
