= Tambun Naibaho =

Indonesian footballer

Personal information
- Full name: Tambun Dibty Naibaho
- Date of birth: October 14, 1990 (age 36)
- Place of birth: Pangururan, Indonesia
- Position: Forward

Senior career*
Years	Team	Apps	(Gls)
2010–2011	Pro Duta	23	(4)
2012–2015	PSMS Medan	32	(10)
2016	PS TNI	24	(5)
2017	Semen Padang	27	(5)
2018	PSS Sleman	13	(4)
2019	PSMS Medan	2	(0)
2019	Persiba Balikpapan	5	(0)
- * Club domestic league appearances and goals as of 2 June 2019

Tambun Dibty Naibaho (born 14 October 1990, in Pangururan) is an Indonesian former footballer who played as a forward.

== Career ==
=== PS TNI ===
Naibaho makes his debut with PS TNI against Madura United FC; Tambun scored a goal even though his team did not win. The score of the match ended 1–2, with Madura United F.C. the second goal when he scored against PSM Makassar in the fifth week at the 2016 Indonesia Soccer Championship A. He was a main player in PS TNI, and proved he always played brilliantly.

=== Semen Padang ===
In 2017, Naibaho joined the Padang club Semen Padang F.C. to compete in Liga 1.

=== PSS Sleman ===
In 2018, Naibaho join to PSS Sleman. He played 13 times and scored 4 goals when PSS Sleman played in the second division.
