= Monieaga Suwardi =

Indonesian association footballer

Personal information
- Full name: Monieaga Bagus Suwardi
- Date of birth: 11 October 1990 (age 36)
- Place of birth: Sleman, Indonesia
- Height: 5 ft 7 in (1.70 m)
- Position: Forward

Team information
- Current team: Persikab Bandung
- Number: 99

Youth career
- 2009–2010: Persema Malang

Senior career*
Years	Team	Apps	(Gls)
2010–2011	Arema Indonesia		
2012–2014	PSS Sleman	20	(8)
2015	Mitra Kukar	1	(0)
2017	Mitra Kukar	5	(0)
2018	Martapura	6	(0)
2019	Sriwijaya	16	(0)
2020	Persijap Jepara	1	(0)
2021–2023	Persekat Tegal	14	(2)
2023–	Persikab Bandung	10	(1)
- * Club domestic league appearances and goals as of 6 February 2024

Monieaga Bagus Suwardi (born 11 October 1990) is an Indonesian professional footballer who plays as a forward for Liga 2 club Persikab Bandung.

== Club career ==
=== Sriwijaya ===
In 2019, Monieaga signed a contract with Indonesian Liga 2 club Sriwijaya.

=== Persijap Jepara ===
He was signed for Persijap Jepara to play in Liga 2 in the 2020 season. This season was suspended on 27 March 2020 due to the COVID-19 pandemic. The season was abandoned and was declared void on 20 January 2021.

=== Persekat Tegal ===
In 2021, Monieaga signed a contract with Indonesian Liga 2 club Persekat Tegal. He made his league debut on 27 September in a 3–1 win against Badak Lampung, and he also scored his first goal for Persekat in the 53rd minute at the Gelora Bung Karno Madya Stadium, Jakarta.
