= Muhammad Ridwan (footballer, born 1991) =

Indonesian footballer (born 1991)

Personal information
- Full name: Muhammad Ridwan
- Date of birth: 26 March 1991 (age 35)
- Place of birth: Tangerang, Indonesia
- Height: 1.80 m (5 ft 11 in)
- Position: Goalkeeper

Team information
- Current team: Persiku Kudus
- Number: 21

Youth career
- 2007–2009: Persita Tangerang

Senior career*
Years	Team	Apps	(Gls)
2010	Tangerang Wolves	13	(0)
2011–2012	Bontang PKT	10	(0)
2012–2013	Persijap Jepara	22	(0)
2014–2015	Persegres Gresik United	3	(0)
2016–2017	Persib Bandung	6	(0)
2017–2018	Semen Padang	11	(0)
2018	Persela Lamongan	11	(0)
2019–2022	Madura United	8	(0)
2022–2024	PSS Sleman	29	(0)
2024–2026	Malut United	6	(0)
2026–	Persiku Kudus	1	(0)

International career
2012	Indonesia U21	4	(0)
2009–2012	Indonesia U23	2	(0)
- * Club domestic league appearances and goals as of 22:15, 12 September 2026 (UTC)

Muhammad Ridwan (born 26 March 1991) is an Indonesian professional footballer who plays as a goalkeeper for Championship club Persiku Kudus.

== Club career ==
=== Persegres Gresik United ===
In 2015 Indonesia Super League, Ridwan joined in the squad of Persegres Gresik United. He was contracted for one year by club management. Ridwan made his debut on 5 April 2015 in a match against Borneo at the Petrokimia Stadium, Gresik.

=== Persib Bandung ===
Ridwan joined to Persib Bandung for 2016 Indonesia Soccer Championship A. He claimed, Persib Bandung is a team that coveted since childhood. He said "Persib is a great team and as a child, I had a dream to play here and finally I've achieved my goal. Obviously, I am delighted to be joining".

=== Semen Padang FC ===
In 2017, Ridwan joined Padang club Semen Padang. He became the third recruit of Semen Padang in this season. Ridwan made his debut on 17 April 2017 in a match against Sriwijaya at the Haji Agus Salim Stadium, Padang.

=== Persela Lamongan ===
In February 2018, Ridwan moved to Persela Lamongan. He made his league debut on 24 March 2018 in a match against Persipura Jayapura at the Mandala Stadium, Jayapura.

=== Madura United ===
In 2019, Ridwan signed a contract with Indonesian Liga 1 club Madura United. He made his debut on 4 July 2019 in a match against PSM Makassar at the Gelora Ratu Pamelingan Stadium, Pamekasan.

=== PSS Sleman ===
Ridwan was signed for PSS Sleman to play in Liga 1 in the 2022–23 season. He made his league debut on 23 July 2022 in a match against PSM Makassar at the Maguwoharjo Stadium, Sleman.

== International career ==
Ridwan called up to Indonesia under-21 team and played in 2012 Hassanal Bolkiah Trophy, but failed to win after losing 0-2 from Brunei under-21 team. In 2009, Ridwan represented the Indonesia U-23, in the 2009 Southeast Asian Games.

== Honours ==
=== International ===
Indonesia U-21

- Hassanal Bolkiah Trophy runner-up: 2012
