= Stevanus Bungaran =

Indonesian footballer

Personal information
- Full name: Stevanus Bungaran
- Date of birth: 24 November 1988 (age 37)
- Place of birth: Balikpapan, East Kalimantan, Indonesia
- Height: 1.70 m (5 ft 7 in)
- Position: Midfielder

Youth career
- 2007: PSSA Balikpapan
- 2008–2010: Persiba Balikpapan

Senior career*
Years	Team	Apps	(Gls)
2009–2012	Persiba Balikpapan	12	(0)
2012–2014	Kalteng Putra	14	(1)
2015	Borneo	0	(0)
2016	Persegres Gresik	2	(0)
2017	PS TNI	14	(0)
2017	Kalteng Putra	10	(0)
2019	Persiba Balikpapan	13	(0)
Total		65	(1)
- * Club domestic league appearances and goals

Stevanus Bungaran (born 24 November 1988 in Balikpapan) is an Indonesian former professional footballer who played as a midfielder.

== Club statistics ==
Club	Season	Super League		Premier Division		Piala Indonesia		Total	
Club	Season	Apps	Goals	Apps	Goals	Apps	Goals	Apps	Goals
Persiba Balikpapan	2009-10	2	0	-		-		2	0
Persiba Balikpapan	2010-11	2	0	-		-		2	0
Persiba Balikpapan	2011-12	8	0	-		-		8	0
Total		12	0	-		-		12	0
