= Ambrizal Umanailo =

Indonesian footballer

Personal information
- Full name: Ambrizal Umanailo
- Date of birth: 12 June 1996 (age 30)
- Place of birth: Ambon, Indonesia
- Height: 1.66 m (5 ft 5 in)
- Position: Winger

Team information
- Current team: Persijap Jepara
- Number: 96

Youth career
- 2012–2015: Villa 2000

Senior career*
Years	Team	Apps	(Gls)
2015	Villa 2000	7	(3)
2015–2017	Persija Jakarta	43	(1)
2018–2019	Borneo	61	(4)
2020–2022	Barito Putera	42	(1)
2023	Borneo Samarinda	8	(0)
2023–2025	Persita Tangerang	26	(0)
2025–2026	Semen Padang	15	(0)
2026	→ Persijap Jepara (loan)	8	(0)
2026–	Persijap Jepara	8	(0)
- * Club domestic league appearances and goals as of 22:00, 7 November 2026 (UTC)

Ambrizal Umanailo (born 12 June 1996) is an Indonesian professional footballer who plays as a winger for Super League club Persijap Jepara.

== Club career ==
=== Villa 2000 ===
In 2012, Umanailo moved to Jakarta to join Villa 2000. He strengthened Villa 2000 in U-16 and U-18 and participate in the Pertamina League. He also played with Villa 2000 B in the Liga Nusantara, in addition to playing in Villa 2000 FC in the First Division League (Divisi Utama).

=== Persija Jakarta ===
In 2015, he moved to Persija Jakarta, but unfortunately the competition stalled because of an unrest between PSSI and Menpora. In the 2016 season, Umanailo appeared extraordinary in Indonesia Soccer Championship between Persija Jakarta against Persipura Jayapura. Umanailo derived as a core player, several times he threatened the Persipura defense. He also scored first for Persija when they faced Persela Lamongan. Umanailo continued feedback from Ismed Sofyan, so, can produce a goal for Persija Jakarta.

=== Borneo FC ===
In 2018 Umanailo signed with Borneo for the 2018 Liga 1. He made his league debut on 25 March 2018 in a match against Sriwijaya. On 1 June 2018, Umanailo scored his first goal for Borneo against PSMS Medan in the 34th minute at the Segiri Stadium, Samarinda. He made 61 league appearances and scored 4 goals for Borneo FC.

=== Barito Putera ===
He was signed for Barito Putera to play in Liga 1 in the 2020 season. Umanailo made his debut on 29 February 2020 in a match against Madura United. On 15 March 2020, Umanailo scored his first goal for Barito Putera in the 35th minute against PSM Makassar. This season was suspended on 27 March 2020 due to the COVID-19 pandemic. The season was abandoned and was declared void on 20 January 2021.
