= Rudi Widodo =

Indonesian footballer

Personal information
- Full name: Rudi Widodo
- Date of birth: 13 July 1983 (age 43)
- Place of birth: Pati, Indonesia
- Height: 1.77 m (5 ft 10 in)
- Position: Forward

Youth career
- 1998–2000: Persipa Pati
- 2000–2002: PSIS Semarang

Senior career*
Years	Team	Apps	(Gls)
2002–2003	Persiku Kudus	12	(1)
2003–2004	Persijatim Solo FC	13	(1)
2004–2005	PSS Sleman	12	(2)
2005–2006	Persiter Ternate	18	(7)
2006–2008	Persis Solo	37	(12)
2008–2010	Pelita Jaya	32	(5)
2010–2011	Persibo Bojonegoro	6	(1)
2011	Sriwijaya	9	(2)
2011–2012	Persela Lamongan	23	(1)
2012–2013	PSPS Pekanbaru	12	(0)
2013	Persiba Balikpapan	10	(0)
2013–2014	Persikabo Bogor	17	(6)
2015-2016	Bhayangkara FC	32	(6)
2017–2018	Persija Jakarta	32	(5)
2019	PSS Sleman	0	(0)
2022	Persipa Pati	1	(0)

International career
2007	Indonesia	2	(0)
- * Club domestic league appearances and goals as of 18 September 2022

Rudi Widodo (born 13 July 1983, in Pati) is an Indonesian former footballer who plays as a forward.

== Honours ==
=== Country honors ===
Indonesia

- Indonesian Independence Cup: 2008

=== Club ===
Persija Jakarta

- Liga 1: 2018
- Indonesia President's Cup: 2018
