= Yulius Mauloko =

Indonesian footballer (born 1990)

Personal information
- Date of birth: 22 July 1990 (age 36)
- Place of birth: Atambua, Indonesia
- Position: Winger

Senior career*
Years	Team	Apps	(Gls)
2016	Bali United		
2017	Boavista-TL		
2017	Gresik United	12	(0)
2018	Western Knights		
- * Club domestic league appearances and goals

Yulius Mauloko (born 22 July 1990) is an Indonesian former footballer who played as a winger.

== Club career ==
Mauloko started his career with Indonesian top flight side Bali United. Before the 2017 season, he signed for Boavista-TL in East Timor. In 2017, Mauloko signed for Indonesian top flight club Gresik United, where he made 12 league appearances and suffered relegation to the Indonesian second tier. On 26 August 2017, he debuted for Gresik United during a 5–0 loss to Bhayangkara.

Before the 2018 season, Mauloko signed for Western Knights in the Australian third tier after receiving an offer from Indonesian top flight team PSM, becoming the first player from East Nusa Tenggara to play abroad.
