= Irfandy Zein =

Indonesian footballer

Personal information
- Full name: Irfandy Zein Al Zubeidy
- Date of birth: 29 August 1995 (age 31)
- Place of birth: Tulehu, Indonesia
- Height: 1.78 m (5 ft 10 in)
- Position: Midfielder

Senior career*
Years	Team	Apps	(Gls)
2016–2019	PS TIRA	19	(1)
2017	→ Persija Jakarta (loan)	9	(0)
2020–2021	Persiraja Banda Aceh	0	(0)
2021–2022	Maluku	12	(0)

International career
2014	Indonesia U-19		
- * Club domestic league appearances and goals

Irfandy Zein Al Zubeidy (born 29 August 1995) is an Indonesian footballer who plays as a midfielder.

== Career ==
Irfandy has joined in the Bali United F.C. For 2015 Jenderal Sudirman Cup. Finally, Irfandy moved from Bali United and joined PS TNI at the Indonesia Soccer Championship event.

=== PS TNI ===
Irfandy made his debut against Bhayangkara F.C. in the second week of ISC. And Irfandy made his first goal in a match against Mitra Kukar F.C. in 8th minutes.
